= Kingsgate Native =

Irish-bred Thoroughbred racehorse

- Sire: Mujadil
- Grandsire: Storm Bird
- Dam: Native Force
- Damsire: Indian Ridge
- Sex: Gelding
- Foaled: 20 February 2005
- Country: Ireland
- Colour: Bay
- Breeder: Peter McCutcheon
- Owner: John Payne; Cheveley Park Stud
- Trainer: John Best; Michael Stoute; Robert Cowell
- Record: 60: 8-10-5
- Earnings: £851,420

Major wins
- Nunthorpe Stakes (2007); Golden Jubilee Stakes (2008); King George Stakes (2009); Temple Stakes (2010, 2013); Achilles Stakes (2015)
- Last updated on 27 August 2016

Kingsgate Native (foaled 20 February 2005) is an Irish-bred, British-trained Thoroughbred racehorse. He was a precocious juvenile sprinter, winning the Nunthorpe Stakes against older horses as well as finishing second in the Prix de l'Abbaye, Windsor Castle Stakes and Molecomb Stakes. He was equally successful in 2008, winning the Golden Jubilee Stakes at Royal Ascot before being retired to become a breeding stallion.

After proving infertile at stud he returned to the track in 2009 and won the King George Stakes. He remained in training until the end of the 2016 season, winning the Temple Stakes in 2010 and 2013 and the Achilles Stakes in 2015 as well as racing prominently in many other major sprint races.

== Background ==
Kingsgate Native is a dark-coated bay horse with a white star bred in Ireland by Peter McCutcheon. He was sired by Mujadil, an American-bred sprinter who recorded his biggest win in the Cornwallis Stakes as a two-year-old in 1990. The best of his other progeny have included Galeota (Mill Reef Stakes), Lesson In Humility (Ballyogan Stakes) and Masta Plasta (Norfolk Stakes). Kingsgate Native's dam Native Force won one minor race as three-year-old in 2001. She was a granddaughter of Spanish Habit, the dam of the 1000 Guineas winner Las Meninas.

As a foal, Kingsgate Native was consigned by the Springfort Park Stud to the Goffs sales in November 2005 and was bought for €28,000 by the Tally Ho Stud. In August 2006 the yearling was auctioned at the St Leger Sale at Doncaster and was sold for 20,000 guineas to Highflyer Bloodstock. The colt entered the ownership of the East End businessman John Mayne and was sent into training with John Best at Hucking on the North Downs in Kent.

== Racing career ==
=== 2007: two-year-old season ===
Kingsgate Native never contested a maiden race, beginning his racing career in the Listed Windsor Castle Stakes over five furlongs at Royal Ascot on 19 June. Ridden by George Baker he started a 66/1 outsider in a twenty-runner field but belied his position in the betting market by finishing second, a head behind the winner Drawnfromthepast. In July, the colt was stepped up in class for a strongly contested renewal of the Group Three Molecomb Stakes at Goodwood Racecourse and started second favourite behind the Queen Mary Stakes runner-up Starlit Sands. In a closely contested finish, he was beaten a neck into second by the filly Fleeting Spirit with Captain Gerrard (later to win the Cornwallis Stakes and the Palace House Stakes) in third.

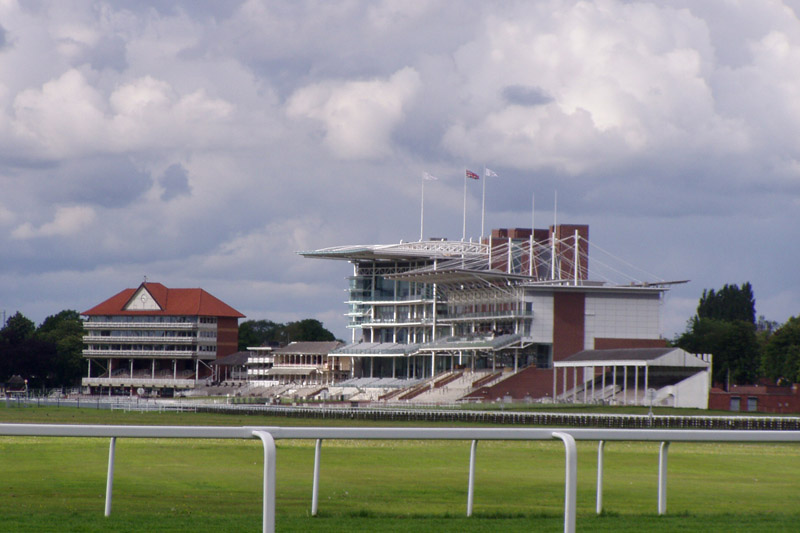
York Racecourse, where Kingsgate Native won the Nunthorpe Stakes in 2007

In August, Kingsgate Native was stepped up to Group One level and matched against older horses in the Nunthorpe Stakes at York Racecourse where he was ridden for the first time by Jimmy Quinn. The Irish-trained four-year-old Dandy Man started favourite ahead of the Australian challenger Magnus (The Galaxy (ATC)), Red Clubs and Moorhouse Lad (King George Stakes) with Kingsgate Native starting at odds of 12/1. The other runners included Hoh Mike (Sprint Stakes), Amadeus Wolf (Middle Park Stakes), Reverence, Beauty Is Truth (Prix du Gros Chêne), Desert Lord (Prix de l'Abbaye), Wi Dud (Flying Childers Stakes) and The Tatling. The sixteen runners split into separate groups across the wide track, with Kingsgate Native tracking the leaders down the centre of the course. He took the lead a furlong out and stayed on well despite hanging left in the closing stages to win by one and three quarter lengths from Desert Lord with Dandy Man taking third ahead of Red Clubs, Wi Dud and Amadeus Wolf. Interviewed after the race, Mayne said "It always surprised me that very few two-year-olds have taken their chance in the Nunthorpe, yet they get such a big pull in the weights... I have an excellent relationship with my trainer John Best. I keep yabbering away about form, and he just ignores what I say". Best said "I always thought he was a very good horse. The difference between a good and very good horse is in the heart and brain".

On his final appearance of the season, Kingsgate Native was sent to France and was again matched against older horses in the Prix de l'Abbaye over 1000 metres at Longchamp Racecourse. He started the 5/2 favourite against sixteen opponents headed by Dandy Man, Desert Lord and the six-year-old gelding Benbaun. After tracking the leaders, he began to make progress in the last 200 metres but finished second, two lengths behind Benbaun.

=== 2008: three-year-old season ===
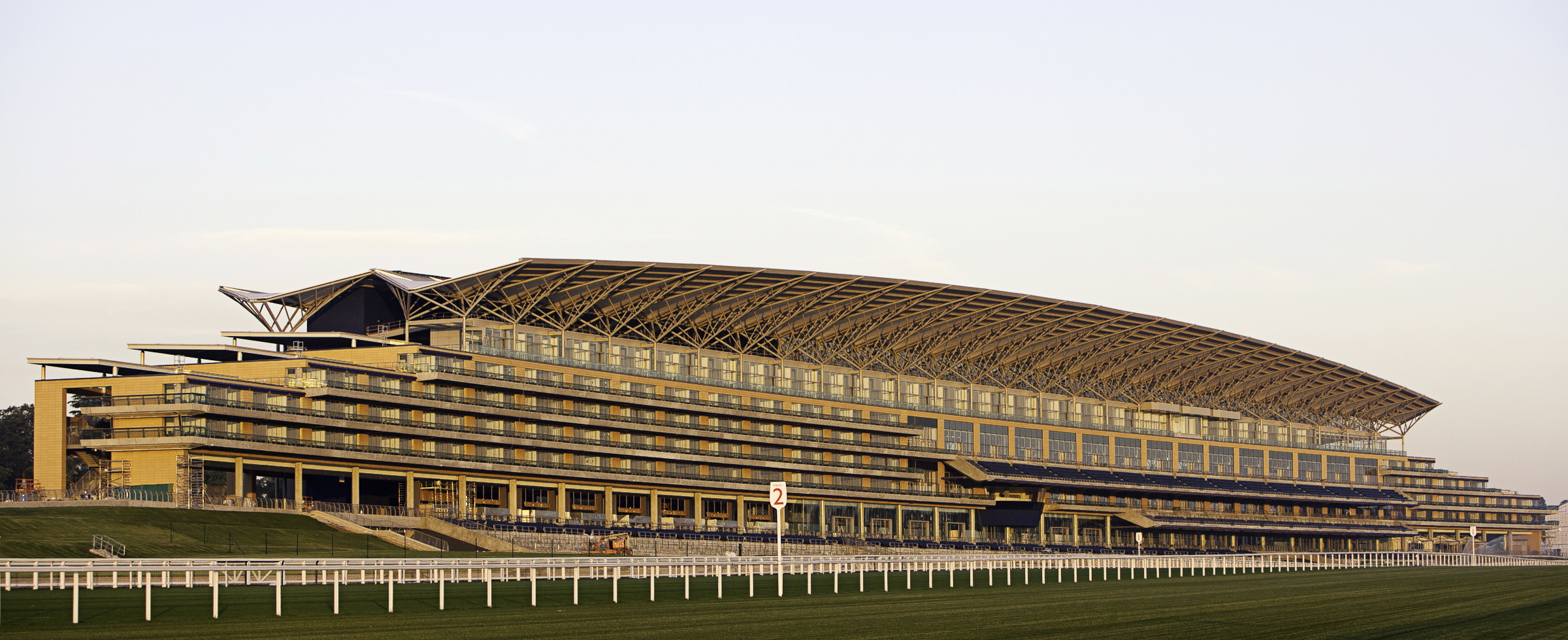
The grandstand at Ascot, where Kingsgate Native won the Golden Jubilee Stakes in 2008

Kingsgate Native did not appear as a three-year-old until the Royal Ascot meeting in June where he contested the two major sprint races. On Tuesday 17 June, the first day of the meeting, he ran in the King's Stand Stakes over five furlongs and started the 8/1 fourth favourite behind Fleeting Spirit, the Australian champion Takeover Target and Magnus. After being in contention until the last quarter mile he faded in the closing stages and finished tenth of the thirteen runners behind Equiano. Four days later, Kingsgate Native, ridden for the first time by Seb Sanders started a 33/1 outsider in the six furlong Golden Jubilee Stakes. Takeover Target started favourite ahead of the French champion Marchand d'Or, the July Cup winner Sakhee's Secret and the Prix Djebel winner US Ranger. The other runners included the South African challenger War Artist, Fat Boy (Sandy Lane Stakes), Sir Gerry (Gimcrack Stakes), Balthazaar's Gift (Hackwood Stakes), Seachange (a multiple Grade 1 winner in New Zealand), Astronomer Royal (Poule d'Essai des Poulains) and Zidane (Stewards' Cup). Sanders restrained the colt in the early stages as Fat Boy set the early pace before Takeover Target went to the front at half way. Kingsgate Native made a forward move approaching the final furlong, overtook Takeover Target 100 yards from the finish and won by one and a quarter lengths from War Artist. Sir Gerry took third as Takeover Target faded into fourth. Best commented "I thought 33-1 was a crazy price for a horse that won the Nunthorpe Stakes last year and he shouldn't have been anywhere near that price", whilst Sanders said that the winner "knuckled down and picked up really well and gave me a terrific ride throughout".

In July Kingsgate Native started at odds of 6/1 for the July Cup at Newmarket Racecourse. In a closely contested finish he finished fifth, just over a length behind the winner Marchand d'Or. A month later, the colt attempted to repeat his 2007 success in the Nunthorpe Stakes, run that year at Newmarket after the York meeting was abandoned. Ridden by Ryan Moore who became his regular jockey, he was restrained in the early stages before finishind strongly to take third behind Borderlescott and the South African mare National Colour.

In September, it was announced that the colt had entered the ownership of the Cheveley Park Stud and would be retired from racing to become a breeding stallion.

=== 2009: "stud career" and four-year-old season ===
In 2009 Kingsgate Native was scheduled to cover a hundred mares at Cheveley Park, but when none of the first twenty mares conceived it became clear that the horse had serious fertility problems. The stud's managing director Chris Richardson described the situation as "desperately disappointing for all concerned". Completely infertile and useless for breeding purposes, the horse was returned to training, joining the Newmarket stable of Michael Stoute.

The colt made his comeback in the Golden Jubilee Stakes on 20 June and finished thirteenth of fourteen behind Art Connoisseur after being eased down by Moore in the closing stages. A month later he started 7/1 third favourite behind Borderlescott and the Greek sprinter Ialysos in the King George Stakes over five furlongs at Goodwood. The other runners included Dandy Man, Equiano, Reverence and Moorhouse Lad (winner of the race in 2007). After tracking the leaders on the near-side (the left-hand side from the jockeys' viewpoint) Kingsgate Native accelerated through a gap to take the lead a furlong out won in "impressive" style by two and three quarter lengths from the three-year-old Total Gallery. After the race Richardson said "We were concerned having done one job, he would find it hard going back to another. It's highly unlikely he'll go back to stud duties. Michael said it took the horse four days to work out he was back in a racing yard and it has taken him this long to get his muscle tone back. But Friday's race was more like a Group One than a Group Three, so we're very pleased".

In August the colt started favourite for the Nunthorpe Stakes but finished sixth behind Borderlescott. Richardson explained that the colt had aggravated a joint injury sustained at Goodwood and would miss the rest of the season.

=== 2010: five-year-old season ===
Kingsgate Native was gelded before the start of the 2010 season. On his first appearance of the year he started joint-favourite with Equiano for the Temple Stakes at Haydock Park on 22 May. Borderlescott and Benbaun were among the opposition, as well as Total Gallery, who had won the Prix de l'Abbaye in October 2009. After tracking the leaders he began to make progress in the last quarter mile, overtook Equiano 100 yards from the finish and won by half a length, with Borderlescott three quarters of a length away in third.

The gelding failed to win in six subsequent races that year but ran prominently in several major sprints. He finished sixth to Equiano in the King's Stand Stakes and fourth to Starspangledbanner in the July Cup before running unplaced in the Nunthorpe. In Autumn he finished fourth in the Haydock Sprint Cup and third in the Diadem Stakes before being sent to contest the Hong Kong Sprint at Sha Tin Racecourse in December where he finished sixth behind the South African gelding J J The Jet Plane.

=== Later career ===
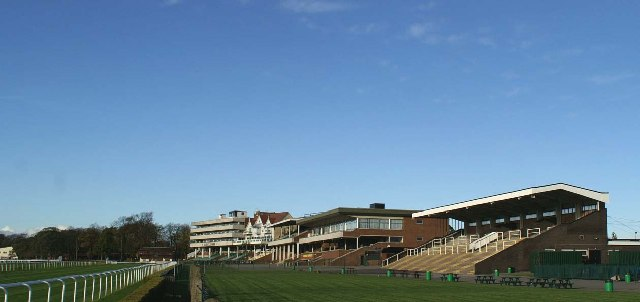
The grandstand at Haydock Park, where Kingsgate Native won the Temple Stakes in 2010 and 2013

Kingsgate Native failed to win in six starts in 2011. He began the year by finishing second to Sole Power in the Temple Stakes and produced his best subsequent effort when running fourth to Margot Did in the Nunthorpe. As a seven-year-old, having moved to the stable of Robert Cowell at Six Mile Bottom, he ran four times without success. His best performance came in the World Trophy at Newbury Racecourse in September when he finished strongly but failed by a short head to catch the three-year-old Swiss Spirit.

As an eight-year-old, the gelding began his campaign in the Palace House Stakes on 4 May in which he was ridden by his new regular jockey Shane Kelly. He started a 25/1 outsider but produced his best performance for some time as he finished second, a length behind Sole Power. Three weeks later he attempted to repeat his 2010 success in the Temple Stakes. Sole Power started favourite ahead of Reckless Abandon and Swiss Spirit with Kingsgate Native starting at 14/1. Kelly tracked the leaders before taking the lead a furlong out the gelding ran on strongly in the closing stages to win by a neck and a head from Swiss Spirit and Reckless Abandon with Sole Power in fourth. After the race Cowell said "He is a very talented horse but so quirky, although when he is right he is right. His preparation has been awesome. Last year it was a bit hit and miss but he still showed a flash of brilliance and he has been training like a bloody good horse. And he has shown it today, I am absolutely thrilled". In later races that year he finished second in the Coral Charge, fifth to Jwala in the Nunthorpe and third to Maarek in the World Trophy.

In the spring of 2014, Kingsgate Native finished second in the Palace House Stakes, third in the Temple Stakes and second in the Coral Charge. Unplaced finishes in his next four starts led his connections to consider retiring the horse before he ended his season in a minor stakes race at Beverley Racecourse. After struggling to obtain a clear run in the closing stages he took the lead 75 yards from the finish and won by a length and three quarters from the three-year-old Green Door.

In 2015, the ten-year-old began his season as usual in the Palace House Stakes when he finished third before finishing unplaced in the Temple Stakes. A week later after his poor run in the Temple Stakes, Kingsgate Native was dropped in class for the Listed Achilles Stakes over the same course and distance. Having been held up by his jockey Graham Lee in the early stages he made rapid progress in the last quarter mile, took the lead inside the final furlong and won by one and a quarter lengths from Out Do. Lee said "This is why we do the job – when you meet guys like this fella. He just wants to please. It's great, and for a 10-year-old he has so much enthusiasm".

He went on to finish unplaced in the Coral Charge, City Walls Stakes and the King George Stakes before showing better form in September when he finished second in the Scarbrough Stakes at Doncaster. He began 2016 with four consecutive defeats, prompting talk of retirement, before he won a minor race at Nottingham in August. He was finally retired at the end of the 2016 season and moved to a new home at the British Racing School in Newmarket. A statement on Cowell's website stated "He will be sorely missed here as his antics around the yard never fail to make us laugh and he certainly still has the ability to act like a youngster and be extremely naughty at times... He has been an absolute super star and we look forward to hearing all about all the mischief he gets up to at his [new home]".

== Assessment ==
In the 2007 International Classification for two-year-olds Kingsgate Native was rated the third-best British-trained colt and the sixth best colt in Europe behind New Approach. In the Cartier Awards for 2007 was nominated in the Champion Two-year-old Colt and Champion Sprinter categories. In the 2008 World Thoroughbred Rankings Kingsgate Native was given a rating of 118, making him the 80th best racehorse in the world and the second best three-year-old sprinter on turf behind Overdose. In subsequent editions of the rankings, Kingsgate Native was ranked 87th in the world in 2009 and 178th in 2010

== Pedigree ==
Pedigree of Kingsgate Native, bay gelding, 2005
Sire Mujadil (USA) 1988	Storm Bird (CAN); 1978	Northern Dancer	Nearctic
Sire Mujadil (USA) 1988	Storm Bird (CAN); 1978	Northern Dancer	Natalma
Sire Mujadil (USA) 1988	Storm Bird (CAN); 1978	South Ocean	New Providence
Sire Mujadil (USA) 1988	Storm Bird (CAN); 1978	South Ocean	Shining Sun
Sire Mujadil (USA) 1988	Vallee Secrete (USA); 1977	Secretariat	Bold Ruler
Sire Mujadil (USA) 1988	Vallee Secrete (USA); 1977	Secretariat	Somethingroyal
Sire Mujadil (USA) 1988	Vallee Secrete (USA); 1977	Midou	Saint Crespin
Sire Mujadil (USA) 1988	Vallee Secrete (USA); 1977	Midou	Midget
Dam Native Force (IRE) 1998	Indian Ridge (IRE); 1985	Ahonoora	Lorenzaccio
Dam Native Force (IRE) 1998	Indian Ridge (IRE); 1985	Ahonoora	Helen Nichols
Dam Native Force (IRE) 1998	Indian Ridge (IRE); 1985	Hillbrow	Swing Easy
Dam Native Force (IRE) 1998	Indian Ridge (IRE); 1985	Hillbrow	Golden City
Dam Native Force (IRE) 1998	La Pellegrina (IRE); 1993	Be My Guest	Northern Dancer
Dam Native Force (IRE) 1998	La Pellegrina (IRE); 1993	Be My Guest	What a Treat
Dam Native Force (IRE) 1998	La Pellegrina (IRE); 1993	Spanish Habit	Habitat
Dam Native Force (IRE) 1998	La Pellegrina (IRE); 1993	Spanish Habit	Donna Cressida (Family: 1-t)

- Kingsgate Native was inbred 3 × 4 to Northern Dancer, meaning that this stallion appears in both the third and fourth generation of his pedigree.
