= Jwala (horse) =

British-bred Thoroughbred racehorse

- Sire: Oasis Dream
- Grandsire: Green Desert
- Dam: Kangra Valley
- Damsire: Indian Ridge
- Sex: Filly
- Foaled: 9 April 2009
- Country: United Kingdom
- Colour: Bay
- Breeder: Manor Farm Stud
- Owner: Manor Farm Stud & S Hoare
- Trainer: Robert Cowell
- Record: 17: 5-4-1
- Earnings: £233,615

Major wins
- City Walls Stakes (2013); Nunthorpe Stakes (2013)

Jwala (9 April 2009 – 8 December 2013) was a British Thoroughbred racehorse. As a two-year-old in 2011 she was beaten in her first four races before recording her first success in a minor race at Wolverhampton Racecourse. In the following year she won her first two races before finishing second to Sole Power in a Listed race at Doncaster. Jwala reached her peak as a four-year-old in 2013. After being beaten in her first four races she defeated a strong field to win the City Walls Stakes at York. At the same track in August she recorded a 40/1 upset win in the Group One Nunthorpe Stakes. She was scheduled to retire from racing at the end of the year but was killed in a fall at Sha Tin Racecourse in December.

== Background ==
Jwala was a bay filly with a white blaze bred by the Manor House Stud at Braunston in Rutland. She was sired by Oasis Dream, a sprinter who won the July Cup and the Nunthorpe Stakes in 2003 before becoming a very successful breeding stallion. His other progeny have included Midday, Muhaarar and Power. Jwalas' dam, Kangra Valley, won one minor race at Thirsk Racecourse in a sixteen race career. Before producing Jwala, she had foaled the Cheveley Park Stakes winner Airwave.

Throughout her racing career, Jwala was trained by Robert Cowell at Six Mile Bottom in Cambridgeshire.

== Racing career ==
=== 2011: two-year-old season ===
Jwala began her racing career by finishing sixth in a maiden race over six furlongs at Great Yarmouth Racecourse on 10 October and then finished second in a similar event on the polytrack surface at Kempton nine days later. On 28 October she was stepped up in class for the Listed Bosra Sham Fillies' Stakes at Newmarket Racecourse and finished eighth of the fourteen runners behind Artistic Jewel. She finished third in a maiden at Kempton in November and was dropped back in distance for a five furlong maiden at Wolverhampton Racecourse on 12 December. Ridden by Shane Kelly, she led from the start and drew away from her rivals in the straight to win by two and three quarter lengths from Pale Orchid.

=== 2012: three-year-old season ===
Jwala began her second season in a minor race over five furlongs at Bath Racecourse on 27 June. Starting at odds of 9/2 she led from the start and won by half a length from Place In My Heart. On her next appearance she carried 128 pounds in a handicap race at Goodwood Racecourse on 3 August. She took the lead a furlong out and fought back after being headed to force a dead heat with Lady Gibraltar. On her third and final appearance of the year, Jwala was stepped up in class to contest the Listed Scarborough Stakes at Doncaster Racecourse on 12 September. She produced her best effort up to that time as she led until the last 30 yards when she was overtaken and beaten one and a half lengths into second by Sole Power.

=== 2013: four-year-old season ===
Jwala began her third season by finishing fifth behind Place In My Heart at Bath in April and then finished last of seven behind Ballista at Chester Racecourse in May. She showed improved form in June, finishing second to Medicean Man in the Achilles Stakes at Haydock Park and second to My Propeller in the Land O'Burns Fillies' Stakes at Ayr. Steve Drowne took over the ride on Jwala when the filly contested the Listed City Walls Stakes at York Racecourse on 13 July. She started a 16/1 outsider in a field which included Hoof It (Stewards' Cup), My Propeller, Tangerine Trees (Prix de l'Abbaye), Borderlescott (Nunthorpe Stakes) and Stepper Point. The field split into two groups with Jwala tracking the leaders on the stands side (the right-hand side from the jockeys' perspective). She finished strongly to take the lead in the final strides and won in a four-way photo-finish from Heeraat, Excelette and Kingsgate Choice. Drowne commented "She's very game and a flat, fast five furlongs is right up her street."

At Goodwood on 2 August, Jwala started at odds of 20/1 for the Group Three King George Stakes and finished last of the seventeen runners behind Moviesta. She appeared to have recovered from banging her head against the starting stalls at the start but faded badly in the closing stages. It was subsequently revealed that she had fractured an eye socket and, according to Cowell "ran punch-drunk". Three weeks later, the filly started a 40/1 outsider for the Group One Nunthorpe Stakes at York. The South African sprinter Shea Shea (Al Quoz Sprint) started favourite ahead of Sole Power, whilst the other runners included Moviesta, Slade Power, Swiss Spirit (World Trophy), Rosdhu Queen (Middle Park Stakes), Spirit Quartz (Prix du Gros Chêne), Kingsgate Native (winner of the race in 2007) and Tickled Pink (Abernant Stakes). Jwala jinked to the right exiting the starting stalls but settled behind the leaders as the outsider Hamish McGonagall set the pace. She took the lead entering the final furlong and held on to win by half a length and a nose from Shea Shea and Sole Power. After the race Cowell said "I'm absolutely thrilled. She is a grand filly who has come on leaps and bounds. She fractured her eye socket last time out and she's come back in fine style." He went on to say "It wasn't really a surprise. I was saying yesterday that I thought she had the best chance of the lot, because she's just uncomplicated, she's got a huge turn of foot and a really high cruising speed and those are the ingredients you need for a really good sprinter". Drowne, who had missed much of the previous season with illness said "Everyone knows my problems last year, but you need a horse like this to bounce back. You just need to land one like this and it gets you back. She's a fabulous filly".

On 6 October, Jwala was sent to France for the Prix de l'Abbaye over 1000 metres at Longchamp Racecourse. Starting the 7/1 second favourite, she took the lead 200 metres from the finish but was overtaken in the closing stages and finished fourth behind Maarek, Catcall and Hamza. Jwala was scheduled to retire at the end of the year, but she had one more race, the Hong Kong Sprint at Sha Tin Racecourse on 8 December. Drawn on the far outside of the fourteen-runner field she chased the leaders before tiring in the straight. In the final furlong she was hampered and fell heavily as Lord Kanaloa won the race. Drowne was taken to hospital with a broken collarbone, but Jwala's injuries were more serious. She was euthanised on the course as the Hong Kong Police Band played the Japanese national anthem in honour of the winner. Cowell said that he was "devastated... Jwala was a special racehorse. I am especially proud to have been part of her life".

== Pedigree ==
Pedigree of Jwala (GB), bay filly, 2009
Sire Oasis Dream (GB) 2000	Green Desert (USA); 1983	Danzig	Northern Dancer
Sire Oasis Dream (GB) 2000	Green Desert (USA); 1983	Danzig	Pas de Nom
Sire Oasis Dream (GB) 2000	Green Desert (USA); 1983	Foreign Courier	Sir Ivor
Sire Oasis Dream (GB) 2000	Green Desert (USA); 1983	Foreign Courier	Courtly Dee
Sire Oasis Dream (GB) 2000	Hope (IRE); 1991	Dancing Brave	Lyphard
Sire Oasis Dream (GB) 2000	Hope (IRE); 1991	Dancing Brave	Navajo Princess
Sire Oasis Dream (GB) 2000	Hope (IRE); 1991	Bahamian	Mill Reef
Sire Oasis Dream (GB) 2000	Hope (IRE); 1991	Bahamian	Sorbus
Dam Kangra Valley (GB) 1991	Indian Ridge (IRE); 1985	Ahonoora	Lorenzaccio
Dam Kangra Valley (GB) 1991	Indian Ridge (IRE); 1985	Ahonoora	Helen Nichols
Dam Kangra Valley (GB) 1991	Indian Ridge (IRE); 1985	Hillbrow	Swing Easy
Dam Kangra Valley (GB) 1991	Indian Ridge (IRE); 1985	Hillbrow	Golden City
Dam Kangra Valley (GB) 1991	Thorner Lane (GB); 1985	Tina's Pet	Mummy's Pet
Dam Kangra Valley (GB) 1991	Thorner Lane (GB); 1985	Tina's Pet	Merry Weather
Dam Kangra Valley (GB) 1991	Thorner Lane (GB); 1985	Spinner	Blue Cashmere
Dam Kangra Valley (GB) 1991	Thorner Lane (GB); 1985	Spinner	Penny Pincher (Family: 19-a)
