= Ya Malak =

British-bred Thoroughbred racehorse

- Sire: Fairy King
- Grandsire: Northern Dancer
- Dam: La Tuerta
- Damsire: Hot Spark
- Sex: Gelding
- Foaled: 18 January 1991
- Country: United Kingdom
- Colour: Bay
- Breeder: Helen Kennard
- Owner: G Jabre; Contrac Promotions & Consultco; JMG Promotions et al
- Trainer: Pip Payne; Ian Balding; David Nicholls
- Record: 49: 10-7-4
- Earnings: £194,102

Major wins
- City Walls Stakes (1994); Achilles Stakes (1995); Vodac Dash (1997); Sprint Stakes (1997); Nunthorpe Stakes (1997)

Ya Malak (18 January 1991 – ca. 25 March 1999) was a British Thoroughbred racehorse. A specialist sprinter, he won ten of his forty-nine races in a track career which lasted from May 1993 until September 1998. In his first three seasons he showed consistent form, winning the City Walls Stakes in 1994 Achilles Stakes in the following year. He appeared to lose his form as a five-year-old and was sold cheaply at auction at the end of the season. After entering the stable of David Nicholls in 1997 he improved into a top class performer, winning the Epsom Dash and the Sprint Stakes before recording his biggest success when dead-heating for the Group One Nunthorpe Stakes. His victory in the Nunthorpe made Alex Greaves the first woman to ride a Group One winner in Europe. The gelding failed to win at seven and died the following spring after complications arising from colic surgery.

== Background ==
Ya Malak was a bay horse bred in the United Kingdom by Bobby and Helen Kennard. He was sired by Fairy King, an American-bred stallion who was retired after sustaining an injury after a single racecourse appearance in Ireland. He became a very successful breeding stallion, siring major winners including Turtle Island, Helissio, Oath and Falbrav. Ya Malak's dam La Tuerta was a useful sprint handicapper who won three races from eleven starts and earned a Timeform rating of 96 in 1995. She was a daughter of Smarten Up who won dead-heated for the Temple Stakes in 1978 who also produced the outstanding sprinter Cadeaux Genereux.

As a yearling the colt was sent to the Tattersalls sales in September 1992 and was bought for 73,000 guineas by the British Bloodstock Agency. The horse entered the ownership of G Jabre and was sent into training with John "Pip" Payne at Newmarket, Suffolk.

== Racing career ==
=== 1993: two-year-old season ===
As a two-year-old in 1993, Ya Malak was ridden in all six of his starts by Ray Cochrane. He made his debut by finishing third in a maiden race over five furlongs at Windsor Racecourse on 10 May and recorded his first success in a similar event at Ripon Racecourse two weeks later. He was then moved up in class and was beaten in his next three races: he finished fifth in the Norfolk Stakes, second in the Dragon Stakes and fourth in the Flying Childers Stakes. On his final appearance of the year in a minor event at Warwick Racecourse in October. Starting the 4/7 favourite he led from the start and won by one and a half lengths from Moscow Road.

=== 1994: three-year-old season ===
As a three-year-old, Ya Malak began his season in minor events, finishing second at Haydock Park in April and then winning at Beverley Racecourse in May. In June he finished unplaced in the Epsom Dash, and second at Sandown Park before winning at Nottingham Racecourse. On 9 July he started 2/1 favourite for the City Walls Stakes over five furlongs at Chester Racecourse. Ridden as in his previous start by Alan Munro he took the lead at half way and won by one and a half lengths from Lucky Parkes. Later that month he was moved up in class for the King George Stakes at Goodwood Racecourse and finished unplaced behind Lochsong before being sent to France where he finished second in the Listed Prix du Cercle at Deauville. A drop in class in autumn saw no improvement as he finished fifth in minor events at Newbury and Newcastle.

=== 1995: four-year-old season ===
In 1995 Ya Malak finished third at Thirsk and second at Beverley before starting a 16/1 outsider for the Listed Achilles Stakes at Kempton Park Racecourse on 3 June. Ridden by the Australian jockey Brent Thomson, who became his regular partner, he tracked the front-running favourite Eveningperformance before overtaking the filly a furlong out and winning by two lengths. He was beaten in his next three starts, finishing second in the Prix Hampton at Évry, sixth in the City Walls Stakes and fourth in the Prix du Cercle. Despite his moderate form, the horse was stepped up to Group One level for the first time in August when he started a 20/1 outsider for the Nunthorpe Stakes at York Racecourse. He produced by far his best effort up to that time, tracking the leaders before staying on in the closing stages to finish second to the Godolphin runner So Factual. On his only subsequent appearance that year he finished sixth to Eveningperformance in the Scarbrough Stakes at Doncaster.

=== 1996: five-year-old season ===
Ya Malak made no impact in 1996, failing to win in nine races. The nearest he came to success was when he finished third to Lucky Parkes in the City Wall Stakes, whilst his only venture into top class saw him finish last of the seventeen runners in the King's Stand Stakes. In the autumn he was removed from Payne and sent to be trained at Ian Balding's stable at Kingsclere for his last two starts, but there was no sign of improvement. In October, the gelding was sent to the Doncaster sales and was bought for 23,000 guineas by the trainer David Nicholls. Nicholls later admitted that the purchase left him £1500 overdrawn but commented "it wasn't a silly thing to do, if you believe in what you are doing".

=== 1997: six-year-old season ===
For the 1997 season, Ya Malak was trained by Nicholls in Yorkshire and ridden all his races by Alex Greaves, Britain's leading female jockey and Nicholls' wife. Nicholls rode the horse in some of his training gallops and described the horse as the fastest he had ever ridden. On his first appearance for his new connections, the gelding finished fifth of six behind Bolshoi in the East Riding Stakes at Beverley in April, tiring in the closing stages after leading a furlong out. On 20 May at the same track he recorded his first win for almost two years in the Angel Stakes. He was restrained by Greaves in the early stages before taking the lead a furlong out and winning by two lengths from the favoured Tadeo. Six days later he was stepped up in class for the Temple Stakes at Sandown and started a 25/1 outsider. He dropped to the rear of the field two furlongs out after being denied a clear run but finished strongly and finished fifth, just over a length behind the winner Croft Pool.

The Dash at Epsom on 7 June saw Ya Malak assigned top weight of 128 pounds against eleven opponents headed by the Michael Jarvis-trained mare Blue Iris. The gelding was always among the leaders, went to the front a furlong out and accelerated away from his opponents to win easily by five lengths. At Royal Ascot thirteen days he started third favourite behind Almaty and Titus Livius in his second attempt to win the King's Stand Stakes. After taking the lead two furlongs out he faded in the closing stages and finished tenth behind the French outsider Don't Worry Me. Ya Malak continued his busy schedule with three races in July. At Sandown on the fifth of the month he faced his old rivals Eveningperformance and Bolshoi in the Sprint Stakes and started third favourite behind Struggler (Prix de Saint-Georges)and To The Roof (1996 Epsom Dash). After being denied a clear run a quarter mile from the finish he recovered to take the lead in the final strides and won by a neck from Struggler. Five days later he reappeared at Chester and finished fourth to Tedburrow in the City Wall Stakes under top weight of 134 pounds. At the end of the month he ran poorly when unplaced behind Averti in the King George Stakes at Goodwood. Nicholls explained the performance by reporting that the gelding had displaying symptoms of horse colic soon after the race.

On 21 August at York, Ya Malak was one of fifteen sprinters to contest the Nunthorpe Stakes and started at odds of 11/1. The July Cup winner Compton Place started favourite ahead of Coastal Bluff, the winner of the Stewards' Cup and the Ayr Gold Cup in 1996. The other runners were Mind Games (Temple Stakes), Indian Rocket (Mill Reef Stakes), Almaty, Averti, Don't Worry Me, Easycall (Flying Childers Stakes), Struggler, Eveningperformance, Bolshoi, Hever Golf Rose, Croft Pool and Cyrano's Lad. Greaves restrained the gelding in the early stages as Eveningperformance set the pace from Coastal Bluff and Mind Games before beginning to make progress at half way. Mind Games went to the front a quarter mile out before Coastal Bluff took the lead entering the final furlong. Ya Malak stayed on strongly in the closing stages and crossed the line level with Coastal Bluff, just ahead of the fast-finishing Averti with the 50/1 outsider Cyrano's Lad taking fourth. After examining the photo finish the racecourse judge declared a dead heat between Ya Malak and Coastal Bluff. Greaves became the first female jockey to win a Group One race in Europe. After the race Greaves commented "Today I think I've shown that if the animal is good enough then so am I" whilst Nicholls said "Ya Malak showed what a good horse he is today and the jockey did the same. I don't have to tell anyone how good she is any more. Everyone in England, Ireland and France can see how capable she is. She's philosophical and realises there are owners and trainers who will never put her up, but that's their problem."

=== Later career and death ===
The horse remained in training but failed to reproduce his 1997 form. He finished unplaced in his first four races before finishing third in a minor stakes race at Newmarket in July. After finishing fifth at Leicester he ended his racing career by finishing sixth behind Almaty at Beverley on 22 September.

Ya Malak was scheduled to return to racing in 1999 and was reported by Nicholls to be "showing his old sparkle" before developing a severe case of colic in March. He underwent surgery at the Minster Veterinary Surgery in York but contracted peritonitis and died shortly afterwards.

== Pedigree ==
Pedigree of Ya Malak (GB), bay gelding, 1991
Sire Fairy King (USA) 1982	Northern Dancer (CAN); 1961	Nearctic	Nearco
Sire Fairy King (USA) 1982	Northern Dancer (CAN); 1961	Nearctic	Lady Angela
Sire Fairy King (USA) 1982	Northern Dancer (CAN); 1961	Natalma	Native Dancer
Sire Fairy King (USA) 1982	Northern Dancer (CAN); 1961	Natalma	Almahmoud
Sire Fairy King (USA) 1982	Fairy Bridge (USA); 1975	Bold Reason	Hail To Reason
Sire Fairy King (USA) 1982	Fairy Bridge (USA); 1975	Bold Reason	Lalun
Sire Fairy King (USA) 1982	Fairy Bridge (USA); 1975	Special	Forli
Sire Fairy King (USA) 1982	Fairy Bridge (USA); 1975	Special	Thong
Dam La Tuerta (GB) 1982	Hot Spark (IRE); 1972	Habitat	Sir Gaylord
Dam La Tuerta (GB) 1982	Hot Spark (IRE); 1972	Habitat	Little Hut
Dam La Tuerta (GB) 1982	Hot Spark (IRE); 1972	Garvey Girl	Princely Gift
Dam La Tuerta (GB) 1982	Hot Spark (IRE); 1972	Garvey Girl	Tekka
Dam La Tuerta (GB) 1982	Smarten Up (GB); 1975	Sharpen Up	Atan
Dam La Tuerta (GB) 1982	Smarten Up (GB); 1975	Sharpen Up	Rocchetta
Dam La Tuerta (GB) 1982	Smarten Up (GB); 1975	Languissola	Soderini
Dam La Tuerta (GB) 1982	Smarten Up (GB); 1975	Languissola	Posh (Family: 10-b)
