= Beverley Bullet Sprint Stakes =

Flat horse race in Britain

- Class: Listed
- Location: Beverley Racecourse; Beverley, England
- Race type: Flat / Thoroughbred
- Sponsor: William Hill
- Website: Beverley

Race information
- Distance: 5f (1,006 metres)
- Surface: Turf
- Track: Straight
- Qualification: Three-years-old and up exc. G1 or G2 winners in 2025
- Weight: 9 st 2 lb (3yo); 9 st 4 lb (4yo+); Allowances; 5 lb for fillies and mares Penalties; 3 lb for Listed winners* 5 lb for Group 3 winners* * after 2021
- Purse: £70,000 (2025); 1st:£39,697

Beverley Bullet Sprint Stakes
2026
Jm Jungle	Argentine Tango	Badri

Previous years
2025
Shagraan	Adrestia	Star Of Lady
2024
Democracy Dilemma	Albasheer	Emaraaty Ana
2023
Kerdos	Silky Wilkie	Apollo One
2022
Tis Marvellous	Arecibo	King Of Stars
2021
Tis Marvellous	Justanotherbottle	Judicial

2020-2011
2020
Dakota Gold	Last Empire	Keep Busy
2019
Judicial	Queens Gift	Fairy Falcon
2018
Take Cover	Mythmaker	Elnadim Star
2017
Take Cover	Final Venture	The Wagon Wheel
2016
Alpha Delphini	Willytheconqueror	Muthmir
2015
Maarek	Line Of Reason	Ridge Ranger
2014
Pearl Secret	Mirza	Line Of Reason
2013
Stepper Point	York Glory	Borderlescott
2012
Borderlescott	Masamah	Confessional
2011
Tangerine Trees	Duchess Dora	Dinkum Diamond

2010-2004
2010
Mister Hughie	Prohibit	Captain Dunne
2009
Exceptional Art	Sohraab	Roker Park
2008
Look Busy	Advanced	Fullandby
2007
Hellvelyn	Borderlescott	Peace Offering
2006
Baltic King	Pivotal's Princess	Bahamian Pirate
2005
Chookie Heiton	Baltic King	Mecca's Mate
2004
Chookie Heiton	Simianna	Baltic King

The Beverley Bullet Sprint Stakes is a Listed flat horse race in Great Britain open to horses aged three years or older. It is run at Beverley over a distance of 5 furlongs (1,006 metres). The race was first run in 2004 and it is scheduled to take place each year in late August or early September.

== Records ==
Most successful horse (2 wins):

- Chookie Heiton (2004, 2005)
- Take Cover (2017, 2018)
- Tis Marvellous (2021, 2022)

Leading jockey (4 wins):

- Tom Eaves – Chookie Heiton (2004, 2005), Tangerine Trees (2011), Democracy Dilemma (2024)

Leading trainer (3 wins):

- Bryan Smart – Hellvelyn (2007), Tangerine Trees (2011), Alpha Delphini (2016)
- Clive Cox - Tis Marvellous (2021,2022), Kerdos (2023)

== Winners ==
Year	Winner	Age	Jockey	Trainer	Time
2004	Chookie Heiton	6	Tom Eaves	Ian Semple	1:03.99
2005	Chookie Heiton	7	Tom Eaves	Ian Semple	1:02.10
2006	Baltic King	6	Kevin Darley	Hughie Morrison	1:03.21
2007	Hellvelyn	3	Ted Durcan	Bryan Smart	1:01.83
2008	Look Busy	3	Slade O'Hara	Alan Berry	1:04.82
2009	Exceptional Art	3	Franny Norton	David Nicholls	1:02.39
2010	Mister Hughie	3	Sam Hitchcott	Mick Channon	1:02.84
2011	Tangerine Trees	6	Tom Eaves	Bryan Smart	1:03.14
2012	Borderlescott	10	Frederik Tylicki	Robin Bastiman	1:02.42
2013	Stepper Point	4	Martin Dwyer	William Muir	1:01.72
2014	Pearl Secret	5	Jamie Spencer	David Barron	1:03.99
2015	Maarek	8	Jamie Spencer	Evanna McCutcheon	1:02.37
2016	Alpha Delphini	5	Connor Beasley	Bryan Smart	1:00.89
2017	Take Cover	10	Tom Queally	David Griffiths	1:02.58
2018	Take Cover	11	David Allan	David Griffiths	1:01.23
2019	Judicial	7	Joe Fanning	Julie Camacho	1:01.53
2020	Dakota Gold	6	Connor Beasley	Michael Dods	1:02.40
2021	Tis Marvellous	7	Paul Hanagan	Clive Cox	0:59.51
2022	Tis Marvellous	8	Paul Hanagan	Clive Cox	1:00.89
2023	Kerdos	3	Ben Curtis	Clive Cox	1:01.12
2024	Democracy Dilemma	4	Tom Eaves	Robert Cowell	1:00.75
2025	Shagraan	4	Kevin Stott	Michael Appleby	1:01.00
2026	Jm Jungle	6	Jason Hart	John & Sean Quinn	1:05.77

== See also ==
- Horse racing in Great Britain
- List of British flat horse races
