= Achilles Stakes =

Flat horse race in Britain

- Class: Listed
- Location: Haydock Park; Haydock, England
- Inaugurated: 1995
- Race type: Flat / Thoroughbred
- Sponsor: Betfred
- Website: Haydock Park

Race information
- Distance: 5f (1,006 metres)
- Surface: Turf
- Track: Straight
- Qualification: Three-years-old and up* *excl G1 / G2 winners since 31 August 2024
- Weight: 8 st 13 lb (3yo); 9 st 7 lb (4yo+); Allowances; 5 lb for fillies and mares Penalties; 5 lb for Listed winners * 3 lb for Group 3 winners* * since 31 August last year
- Purse: £55,000 (2025); 1st: £31,191

Achilles Stakes
2026
Washington Heights	Ten Pounds	Luna A Inbhir Nis

Previous years
2025
Balmoral Lady	No Half Measures	Shagraan
2024
Believing	Commanche Falls	Korker
2023
Regional	Equilateral	Raasel
2022
Raasel	Dragon Symbol	Tabdeed
2021
King's Lynn	Moss Gill	Count D'Orsay

2020-2011
2020
El Astronaute	Tarboosh	Final Venture
2019
Maid In India	Lady In France	Tarboosh
2018
Muthmir	Alpha Delphini	Gracious John
2017
Final Venture	Kyllang Rock	Rosie Briar
2016
Take Cover	Cotai Glory	Double Up
2015
Kingsgate Native	Out Do	Speed Hawk
2014
Steps	Eton Rifles	Da'quonde
2013
Medicean Man	Jwala	My Propeller
2012
Excelette	Spirit Quartz	Noble Storm
2011
Noble Storm	Santo Padre	Arctic Feeling

2010-2001
2010
High Standing	Rose Blossom	Judd Street
2009
Ialysos	Anglezarke	Hoh Hoh Hoh
2008
Stoneacre Lad	Cake	Green Manalishi
2007
Dazed And Amazed	Intrepid Jack	Rowe Park
2006
The Lord	Green Manalishi	Corridor Creeper
2005
Boogie Street	Jimmy Ryan	Indian Maiden
2004
Boogie Street	Lochridge	The Tatling
2003
Peruvian Chief	Vision Of Night	Boleyn Castle
2002
The Trader	Fromsong	Indian Spark
2001
Emerald Peace	Misraah	Borders

2000-1995
2000
Monkston Point	Vita Spericolata	See You Later
1999
Proud Native	Almaty	To The Roof
1998
Midnight Escape	Cortachy Castle	Averti
1997
Almaty	Compton Place	Rambling Bear
1996
Brave Edge	Double Quick	Blue Iris
1995
Ya Malak	Eveningperformance	Royale Figurine

The Achilles Stakes is a Listed flat horse race in Great Britain open to horses aged three years or older. It is run at Haydock Park over a distance of 5 furlongs (1,006 metres), and it is scheduled to take place each year in late May or early June.

The race was first run in 1995, at Kempton Park (the planned inaugural running in 1994 was abandoned). The race was run at Goodwood in 2005 and 2006 before returning to Kempton Park which was by now an all-weather track. The race was transferred to its current location in 2009.

== Records ==
Most successful horse (2 wins):

- Boogie Street – 2004, 2005

Leading jockey (3 wins):

- Richard Hughes – Boogie Street (2004), Boogie Street (2005), Dazed And Amazed (2007)

Leading trainer (4 wins):

- Richard Hannon Sr. – Brave Edge (1996), Boogie Street (2004), Boogie Street (2005), Dazed And Amazed (2007)

== Winners ==
Year	Winner	Age	Jockey	Trainer	Time
1994	Meeting abandoned after two races due to unsafe ground
1995	Ya Malak	4	Brent Thomson	James Payne	0:58.87
1996	Brave Edge	5	Pat Eddery	Richard Hannon Sr.	0:59.33
1997	Almaty	4	Frankie Dettori	John Gosden	0:57.42
1998	Midnight Escape	5	Seb Sanders	Chris Wall	0:58.09
1999	Proud Native	5	Alex Greaves	David Nicholls	0:58.07
2000	Monkston Point	4	Richard Quinn	David Arbuthnot	1:06.38
2001	Emerald Peace	4	Mark Tebbutt	Michael Jarvis	0:58.99
2002	The Trader	4	Jimmy Quinn	Martin Blanshard	0:57.40
2003	Peruvian Chief	6	Eddie Ahern	Nick Littmoden	0:58.30
2004	Boogie Street	3	Richard Hughes	Richard Hannon Sr.	0:58.96
2005	Boogie Street	4	Richard Hughes	Richard Hannon Sr.	0:58.85
2006	The Lord	6	John Egan	Bill Turner	1:00.84
2007	Dazed And Amazed	3	Richard Hughes	Richard Hannon Sr.	0:59.85
2008	Stoneacre Lad	5	George Baker	Peter Grayson	0:59.96
2009	Ialysos	5	William Buick	Luca Cumani	0:59.71
2010	High Standing	5	Ryan Moore	William Haggas	1:01.32
2011	Noble Storm	5	Graham Gibbons	Ed McMahon	0:59.46
2012	Excelette	3	Royston Ffrench	Bryan Smart	1:00.36
2013	Medicean Man	7	Steve Drowne	Jeremy Gask	0:58.00
2014	Steps	6	Kieren Fallon	Roger Varian	1:00.87
2015	Kingsgate Native	10	Graham Lee	Robert Cowell	1:00.35
2016	Take Cover	9	David Allan	David Griffiths	0:58.41
2017	Final Venture	5	Oisin Murphy	Paul Midgley	1:01.76
2018	Muthmir	8	Jim Crowley	William Haggas	0:57.91
2019	Made In India	5	Tom Eaves	Eric Alston	1:02.10
2020 (Note: The 2020 race was run at Doncaster in June and restricted to four-year-olds and above due to the COVID-19 pandemic in the United Kingdom)	El Astronaute	7	Jason Hart	John Quinn	0:58.64
2021	King's Lynn	4	Oisin Murphy	Andrew Balding	1:01.18
2022	Raasel	5	James Doyle	Michael Appleby	0:58.18
2023	Regional	5	Callum Rodriguez	Edward Bethell	0:57.02
2024	Believing	4	Daniel Tudhope	George Boughey	1:00.17
2025	Balmoral Lady	4	Paul Mulrennan	Ed Walker	0:59.93
2026	Washington Heights	6	Tom Eaves	Kevin Ryan	0:59.68

== See also ==
- Horse racing in Great Britain
- List of British flat horse races
