= City Walls Stakes =

Flat horse race in Britain

City Walls Stakes
2026
Redorange	Aspect Island	Jm Jungle

Previous years
2025
Washington Heights	Miss Attitude	Jm Jungle
2024
Starlust	Rogue Lightning	Democracy Dilemma
2023
Nymphadora	Silky Wilkie	Great State
2022
Royal Aclaim	Mondammej	Korker
2021
Winter Power	Moss Gill	Urban Beat

2020-2011
2020
Moss Gill	Al Raya	Que Amoro
2019
Copper Knight	Dark Shot	Poetry
2018
Mr Lupton	Alpha Delphini	Muthmir
2017
Take Cover	Final Venture	Cotai Glory
2016
Marsha	Easton Angel	Muthmir
2015
Out Do	Monsieur Joe	Cotai Glory
2014
Take Cover	G Force	Monsieur Joe
2013
Jwala	Heeraat	Excelette
2012
Hamish McGonagall	Pabusar	Monsieur Joe
2011
Masamah	Amour Propre	Hamish McGonagall

2010-2001
2010
Blue Jack	Captain Dunne	Borderlescott
2009
Borderlescott	Captain Gerrard	Hoh Hoh Hoh
2008
Green Manalishi	Borderlescott	Angus Newz
2007
Our Little Secret	Fathom Five	Bond City
2006
Tournedos	Desert Lord	Ooh Aah Camara
2005
Tournedos	Majestic Missile	Fire Up The Band
2004
Fire Up The Band	Talbot Avenue	Dragon Flyer
2003
Bishops Court	Dragon Flyer	Ego
2002
Bishops Court	Dragon Flyer	Jessica's Dream
2001
Danehurst	Superstar Leo	Damalis

2000-1993
2000
Indian Spark	Rosselli	Tedburrow
1999
Tedburrow	To The Roof	Ziggy's Dancer
1998
Tedburrow	Bishops Court	Dashing Blue
1997
Tedburrow	Bishops Court	Ziggy's Dancer
1996
Lucky Parkes	Amazing Bay	Ya Malak
1995
Ziggy's Dancer	Glorious Aragon	Lucky Parkes
1994
Ya Malak	Lucky Parkes	Palacegate Episode
1993
Stack Rock	Palacegate Episode	Bunty Boo

The City Walls Stakes is a Listed flat horse race in Great Britain open to horses aged three years or older. It is run at York over a distance of 5 furlongs (1,006 metres), and it is scheduled to take place each year in July.

The race was transferred to York in 2011 having previously been run at Chester. It was run as a handicap prior to becoming a Conditions race in 1993.

== Records ==
Most successful horse (3 wins):

- Tedburrow (1997, 1998, 1999)

Leading jockey (3 wins):

- David Allan – Hamish McGonagall (2012), Take Cover (2017), Copper Knight (2019)

Leading trainer (5 wins):

- Eric Alston – Stack Rock (1993), Ziggy's Dancer (1995), Tedburrow (1997, 1998, 1999)

== Winners ==
Year	Winner	Age	Jockey	Trainer	Time
1993	Stack Rock	6	Kieren Fallon	Eric Alston	1:03.41
1994	Ya Malak	3	Alan Munro	James Payne	1:01.17
1995	Ziggy's Dancer	4	Steve Williams	Eric Alston	1:01.86
1996	Lucky Parkes	6	John Carroll	Jack Berry	0:59.93
1997	Tedburrow	5	David Griffiths	Eric Alston	0:59.93
1998	Tedburrow	6	Willie Supple	Eric Alston	0:59.56
1999	Tedburrow	7	John Egan	Eric Alston	1:00.13
2000	Indian Spark	6	Tony Culhane	Jim Goldie	1:00.72
2001	Danehurst	3	Seb Sanders	Sir Mark Prescott	0:59.86
2002	Bishops Court	8	Joe Fanning	Lynda Ramsden	0:59.42
2003	Bishops Court	9	Paul Fessey	Lynda Ramsden	0:59.84
2004	Fire Up The Band	5	Adrian Nicholls	David Nicholls	0:59.74
2005	Tournedos	3	Simon Whitworth	John Akehurst	0:59.24
2006	Tournedos	4	Tony Culhane	Roger Charlton	1:00.61
2007	Our Little Secret	5	Liam Keniry	Alan Berry	1:02.53
2008	Green Manalishi	7	Eddie Ahern	Kevin Ryan	1:00.87
2009	Borderlescott	7	Pat Cosgrave	Robin Bastiman	1:00.30
2010	Blue Jack	5	Richard Kingscote	Tom Dascombe	1:00.21
2011	Masamah	5	Philip Makin	Kevin Ryan	0:58.37
2012	Hamish McGonagall	7	David Allan	Tim Easterby	0:59.41
2013	Jwala	4	Steve Drowne	Robert Cowell	0:58.12
2014	Take Cover	7	Andrea Atzeni	David Griffiths	0:56.35
2015	Out Do	6	Phillip Makin	David O'Meara	0:58.00
2016	Marsha	3	Luke Morris	Sir Mark Prescott	0:56.35
2017	Take Cover	10	David Allan	David Griffiths	0:57.26
2018	Mr Lupton	5	Jack Garritty	Richard Fahey	0:57.54
2019	Copper Knight	5	David Allan	Tim Easterby	0:58.16
2020	Moss Gill	4	Daniel Tudhope	James Bethell	0:58.12
2021	Winter Power	3	David Allan	Tim Easterby	0:58.12
2022	Royal Aclaim	3	Andrea Atzeni	James Tate	0:57.72
2023	Nymphadora	4	Jason Watson	Andrew Balding	0:58.02
2024	Starlust	3	Hector Crouch	Ralph Beckett	0:59.35
2025	Washington Heights	5	Shane Gray	Kevin Ryan	0:57.21
2026	Redorange	4	P. J. McDonald	Clive Cox	0:57.28

== See also ==
- Horse racing in Great Britain
- List of British flat horse races
