= Coastal Bluff =

British-bred Thoroughbred racehorse

- Sire: Standaan
- Grandsire: Zeddaan
- Dam: Combattente
- Damsire: Reform
- Sex: Gelding
- Foaled: 19 April 1992
- Country: United Kingdom
- Colour: Grey
- Breeder: R M West
- Owner: Mrs D E Sharp; Paul Dixon
- Trainer: David Barron; Nick Littmoden
- Record: 56: 9-4-3
- Earnings: £228,381

Major wins
- Stewards' Cup (1996); Ayr Gold Cup (1996); Nunthorpe Stakes (1997)

Coastal Bluff (foaled 19 April 1992) was a British Thoroughbred racehorse. First trained by David Barron in Yorkshire he finished second on his only start as a juvenile before winning two minor races in the following year. In 1996 he emerged as a highly successful sprinter with wins in the Stewards' Cup and the Ayr Gold Cup before his season was ended by injury. He returned as a five-year-old to dead-heat for the Nunthorpe Stakes despite his bridle breaking just after the start. He developed various training problems, failed to win in two races in 1998 and was sold at the end of the year. He remained in training for four more years but won only two minor races from 37 further starts before his retirement in 2002.

== Background ==
Coastal Bluff was an unusually large grey horse bred in the United Kingdom by R M West. He was probably the best horse sired by Standaan, a grey sprinter who won the Stewards' Cup in 1979 and the Palace House Stakes in 1981. Coastal Bluff's dam Conbattente showed little ability as a racehorse, but her grandmother Tina was a successful broodmare whose descendants included Rose Dubarry, the leading juvenile filly of 1971 in Britain and Commanche Court.

In November 1992, the colt foal was consigned by West to the Tattersalls sale where he attracted little interest and was bought for 1,150 guineas by J Halford. The sale does not appear to have been finalised as the foal returned to West's ownership. At Doncaster the following March he was again put up for auction and sold for 2,700 guineas to the trainer David Barron. Coastal Bluff was taken into training by Barron at Maunby, North Yorkshire and a three-quarter share was sold to David Sharp who raced the horse in the ownership of his wife. Barron's stable was known as a "gambling yard" which often landed big wins in the betting market: the trainer admitted "If I can help an owner's expenses, I will. I'm not someone who gives out information easily, and I believe that if there is any money to be made, the man who's paying the bills should get the first chance to make it." In his early career Coastal Bluff was always ridden by either Kevin Darley or Jimmy Fortune.

== Racing career ==
=== 1994 & 1995: early career ===
Coastal Bluff made his racecourse debut in a maiden race over five furlongs at Redcar Racecourse on 6 July 1994. He started a 16/1 outsider but finished well to take second, three quarters of a length behind the winner Tomal. He did not race again that year.

Coastal Bluff made his first appearance for almost nine months when he finished unplaced in a maiden at Warwick on 1 April 1995, and then recorded his first victory sixteen days later when he took a similar event at Nottingham Racecourse by three and a half lengths. For the remainder of the season he was campaigned in handicap races and ran five more times. He finished fifth at Thirsk Racecourse in May, fourth at Newmarket in early June and second when favourite for a more valuable event at York two weeks later. After a two-month break he returned to finish third under 138 pounds at Newcastle Racecourse before ending his season at Ascot in October. Ridden by Darley, he was restrained in the early stages before taking the lead inside the final furlong to win by a neck from the Richard Hannon-trained Fire Dome.

=== 1996: four-year-old season ===
On his first appearance as a four-year-old, Coastal Bluff carried 118 pounds in the Wokingham Stakes over six furlongs at Royal Ascot in June. Ridden as in all his starts that year by Fortune, he finished thirteenth of the twenty-nine runners behind Emerging Market after appearing somewhat outpaced in the closing stages. In a minor handicap at York on 12 July, the gelding carried 130 pounds and won by a head from Tedburrow after taking the lead inside the final furlong. Barron later claimed that he had wanted the gelding to incur a weight penalty so that Fortune could ride him in his next race. On 3 August, Coastal Bluff was one of thirty handicappers to contest the Stewards' Cup over six furlongs at Goodwood Racecourse. Carrying 117 pounds, he was made the 10/1 joint-favourite with the six-year-old Double Bounce. He was among the leaders from the start, went to the front two furlongs out, and drew away to win by three lengths from Double Bounce. After the race Jimmy Fortune commented "I kept my head down and went for the line. It was only when I saw the video that I realised how far we were in front" whilst the Sunday Mirror's correspondent commented that the gelding had "turned a 30-runner handicap into a one-horse cakewalk". Barron was more understated, saying "he won it quite well".

The Ayr Gold Cup on 21 September saw Coastal Bluff start the 3/1 favourite against twenty-seven opponents despite being assigned top weight of 136 pounds. Before the race he had produced an outstanding performance in a training gallop but Barron had kept the result of the trial private until major bets had been placed. His closest rivals in the betting were the six-year-old Double Splendour and the five-year-old Prince Babar. The gelding was always close to the lead before going to the front on the stands-side two furlongs out. He stayed on in the closing stages to win by a length and a half from the Welsh-trained Mr Bergerac, with Prince Babar and Double Splendour in third and fourth. His owner David Sharp claimed "We knew Coastal Bluff was something special as a two year old. He was left ten lengths at Redcar, ran into the fence and was still only beaten a short-head at the line". The gelding sustained a serious hoof injury on the return to his stable and was unable to race again that year. Barron claimed that he was "never the same horse again".

=== 1997: five-year-old season ===
In 1997 Coatal Bluff was moved up from handicaps to compete in weight-for-age races and was ridden in all five of his races by Darley. On his seasonal debut he made his first appearance for well over nine months when he contested the Group One July Cup at Newmarket on 10 July. He took the lead at half-way before tiring in the closing stages and finished fifth behind Compton Place, Royal Applause, Indian Rocket and Bahamian Bounty. Two weeks later at the same course he started odds-on favourite for a minor stakes race over five furlongs and won "cleverly" by a neck from the Flying Childers winner Easycall with Brave Edge (Achilles Stakes) in third. On 2 August he attempted to repeat his 1996 success in the Stewards' Cup but finished unplaced behind Danetime under a weight of 136 pounds.

On 21 August at York, Coastal Bluff was one of fifteen sprinters to contest the Nunthorpe Stakes and started the 6/1 second favourite behind Compton Place. The other runners included Mind Games (Temple Stakes), Almaty (Molecomb Stakes), Averti (King George Stakes), Ya Malak, Don't Worry Me (King's Stand Stakes), Easycall, Struggler (Prix de Saint Georges), Eveningperformance (Flying Five, Hever Golf Rose) and Croft Pool (Temple Stakes). Coastal Bluff was bumped exiting the stalls as Struggler veered sharply to the left. The gelding's bridle broke soon afterwards and Darley was left without an effective steering mechanism, being forced at one point to cling on to the horse's mane. Despite his disadvantage, Coastal Bluff was among the leaders throughout, tracking Eveningperformance and Mind Games before taking the lead entering the final furlong. In the closing stages he was pressed by Ya Malak and the two horses crossed the line together, just ahead of the fast-finishing Averti with the 50/1 outsider Cyrano's Lad taking fourth. After examining the photo finish the racecourse judge declared a dead heat between Coastal Bluff and Ya Malak. Describing the ride on Coastal Bluff, Darley said "the horse jumped very well but I was frightened that he was that little bit keen early on. When I took hold of him to take him back, something just went. I heard something go ping. Horses came either side and that helped me with the steering and while he was bang in there with a chance I wasn't going to give up on him. Thankfully he's got a long mane so I used that as best I could to keep my balance. It was a bit scary but out there the adrenaline is flowing and my first thoughts were that he was still in the race and I wanted to get the job done. I didn't get scared until afterwards".

On his only subsequent start of 1997, Coastal Bluff started the 9/2 third favourite behind Royal Applause for the Haydock Park Sprint Cup over six furlongs on 5 September. After chasing the leaders he weakened badly to finish eighth of the nine runners. When asked by the stewards to explain the gelding's poor effort, Barron reported that Coastal Bluff was "blowing excessively" after the race.

=== 1998 – 2002: later career ===
Coastal Bluff made no impact in 1998 when he made only two appearances finishing unplaced in both the Palace House Stakes and the King's Stand Stakes. The horse had developed respiratory problems and also suffered a serious a tendon injury. Barron wanted to retire him, but Sharp insisted on putting the horse up for auction. In October he was sent to the Tattersalls sale and bought for 17,000 guineas by Linda Tate Bloodstock.

For the 1999 season, the gelding moved to the stable of Nick Littmoden at Newmarket. Although it was reported that he had recovered from his injury problems, Coastal Bluff failed to show any worthwhile form as a seven-year-old, and finished no better than sixth in nine starts. He did a little better in 2000 when he ran thirteen times and won a minor handicap at Nottingham in June as well as finishing second twice. After finishing unplaced on his first appearance of 2001 he produced one of the best performances of his later career as he won the Be Friendly Handicap at Haydock Park in May at odds of 33/1. He finished unplaced in four subsequent races that year. He remained in training as a ten-year-old but failed to win in nine races. He finished third in minor handicaps at Warwick and Newmarket and ended his career by finishing last of the eight runners in a similar event at Great Yarmouth Racecourse on 25 August 2002.

Commenting on the horse's later career, Barron said in 2004 "It was a thorn in my side for a bit after he went, and I didn't enjoy seeing him run, but time is a great healer, and now he's with Paul Dixon and at least he's got a good home"

== Pedigree ==
Pedigree of Coastal Bluff (GB), grey gelding, 1992
Sire Standaan (FR) 1976	Zeddaan (GB); 1965	Grey Sovereign	Nasrullah
Sire Standaan (FR) 1976	Zeddaan (GB); 1965	Grey Sovereign	Kong
Sire Standaan (FR) 1976	Zeddaan (GB); 1965	Vareta	Vilmorin
Sire Standaan (FR) 1976	Zeddaan (GB); 1965	Vareta	Veronique
Sire Standaan (FR) 1976	Castania (GER); 1969	Orsini	Ticino
Sire Standaan (FR) 1976	Castania (GER); 1969	Orsini	Oranien
Sire Standaan (FR) 1976	Castania (GER); 1969	Chios	Nearco
Sire Standaan (FR) 1976	Castania (GER); 1969	Chios	Chione
Dam Combattente (GB) 1978	Reform (GB); 1964	Pall Mall	Palestine
Dam Combattente (GB) 1978	Reform (GB); 1964	Pall Mall	Malapert
Dam Combattente (GB) 1978	Reform (GB); 1964	Country House	Vieux Manoir
Dam Combattente (GB) 1978	Reform (GB); 1964	Country House	Miss Coventry
Dam Combattente (GB) 1978	Tenzone (GB); 1966	Aggressor	Combat
Dam Combattente (GB) 1978	Tenzone (GB); 1966	Aggressor	Phaetonia
Dam Combattente (GB) 1978	Tenzone (GB); 1966	Tina	Tulyar
Dam Combattente (GB) 1978	Tenzone (GB); 1966	Tina	Bibi Toori (Family: 9-c)
