= Borderlescott =

British-bred Thoroughbred racehorse

- Sire: Compton Place
- Grandsire: Indian Ridge
- Dam: Jeewan
- Damsire: Touching Wood
- Sex: Gelding
- Foaled: 12 April 2002
- Country: United Kingdom
- Colour: Bay
- Breeder: James Clark
- Owner: Robin Bastiman; Border Rail & Plant Ltd; James Edgar; James Edgar & William Donldson
- Trainer: Robin Bastiman
- Record: 85: 14–20–10
- Earnings: £798,863

Major wins
- Stewards' Cup (2006); Nunthorpe Stakes (2008, 2009); Mercury Stakes (2008); City Walls Stakes (2009); King George Stakes (2010); Beverley Bullet Sprint Stakes (2012)

Borderlescott (foaled 12 April 2002) is a British Thoroughbred racehorse. A specialist sprinter noted for his consistency and durability he raced 85 times on 25 different tracks in twelve seasons between 2004 and 2015. He won fourteen races and was placed second or third on thirty occasions. In his early career the gelding showed promising form, winning one minor race as a juvenile in 2004 and four handicap races in the following year. In 2006 he recorded his first major success when he won the Stewards' Cup. He failed to win in 2007 but emerged as a top-class sprinter in the following year when his wins included the Nunthorpe Stakes. He won the Nunthorpe Stakes again in 2009 and added a win in the King George Stakes in 2010. He won the Beverley Bullet Sprint Stakes in 2012 before being retired at the end of the year. He came out of retirement in 2013 and raced nineteen times without success before being retired again in 2015.

== Background ==
Borderlescott is a small bay horse with a narrow white blaze bred by James Clark. He was sired by Compton Place, a sprinter who won the July Cup in 1997, before becoming a successful breeding stallion. Compton Place was a representative of the Byerley Turk sire line, unlike more than 95% of modern thoroughbreds, who descend directly from the Darley Arabian. Borderlescott's dam Jeewan, a daughter of the St Leger winner Touching Wood, won one minor race at Catterick Racecourse from seven attempts as a three-year-old in 1988. She was descended from Caerlissa, a broodmare who was the ancestor of other major winners including Flying Water and St Paddy.

As a yearling in October 2003, Borderlescott was consigned to the Doncaster Sales and was bought for 13,000 guineas by Robin Bastiman. Bastiman trained the horse at his stable at Cowthorpe in North Yorkshire.

== Racing career ==
=== 2004–2007: early career ===
Borderlescott began his racing career by finishing sixth in a maiden race over five furlongs at York Racecourse on 11 June. After finishing unplaced in a similar event at Carlisle later that month he ran third at Beverley before recording his first success in a nursery (a handicap race for juveniles) at Hamilton Park Racecourse on 31 July.

In his second season Borderlescott raced exclusively in handicaps and made steady improvement in his eight races. He won minor events at Haydock Park in May, Redcar and Ripon Racecourse in August and a more valuable event at York in October. In the last-named race, the Coral Sprint Trophy over six furlongs, he took the lead at half way, went clear of his seventeen rivals approaching the final furlong and held on to win by three quarters of a length from Machinist. The beaten horses included Les Arcs and Continent

Borderlescott began his third season by winning a handicap over six furlongs at York in May and was then sent to Royal Ascot where he finished fourth under a weight of 130 pounds in the Wokingham Stakes. He was then sent to Ireland and moved up in class for the Listed Belgrave Stakes at Fairyhouse where he was beaten a head by the seven-year-old Osterhase. On 5 August the gelding carried a weight of 131 pounds in the Stewards' Cup at Goodwood Racecourse and started at odds of 10/1 in a field of 27 runners. Ridden as in most of his early races by Royston Ffrench he tracked the leaders before taking the lead 150 yards from the finish. In a blanket finish, he prevailed by a neck from Mutamared with five other runners within a length of the winner. In the Ayr Gold Cup in September, Borderlesscott carried top weight of 136 pounds and finished second of the 23 runners behind Fonthill Road, before being sent to France where he finished sixth in the Listed Prix de Bonneval at Chantilly Racecourse. On his final appearance of the year he was stepped up to Group Three level for the first time for the Bentinck Stakes at Newmarket Racecourse on 13 October. He took the lead a furlong out but was caught in the last stride and beaten a short head by the favourite Bygone Days.

As a five-year-old, Borderlesscot failed to win in ten races but showed consistent form in major sprints. After finishing second at Haydock on his debut he was runner-up in the Listed Leisure Stakes at Windsor before being stepped up to Group One level and finishind unplaced in the Golden Jubilee Stakes and the July Cup. When attempting to repeat his 2006 in the Stewards' Cup he was beaten a short head by Zidane, to whom he was conceding eight pounds. Another short head defeat followed in the Beverley Bullet before he finished unplaced in the Ayr Gold Cup. In late autumn he finished fourth in the Bentinck Stakes and then sustained two narrow defeats in Listed races when finishing second in the Wentworth Stakes at Doncaster and the Golden Rose Stakes on the Polytrack surface at Lingfield Park.

=== 2008: six-year-old season ===
On his first appearance of 2008, Borderlescott started 5/4 favourite for a minor event over five furlongs at Musselburgh Racecourse on 2 May. Ridden for the first time by Robert Winston, he took the lead inside the final furlong and won by a length and a half from Desert Lord. He was then stepped up in class for the Temple Stakes at Haydock and finished second, beaten two lengths by the three-year-old filly Fleeting Spirit.

The gelding was dropped back to Listed class for the Cathedral Stakes at Salisbury in June. He started 7/4 favourite but was beaten two lengths by the Richard Hannon, Sr-trained Edge Closer. In the City Walls Stakes at Chester in July he took the lead in the closing stages but was caught in the last stride and beaten a nose by Green Manalishi. On 2 August Borderlescott carried 136 pounds as he ran for the third time in the Stewards' Cup. He was among the leaders from the start and established a clear advantage two furlongs out but was overtaken in the closing stages and finished third behind Conquest and King's Apostle.

Borderlescott was then aimed at the Group One Nunthorpe Stakes at York. The meeting was abandoned owing to the poor condition of the track and the Nunthorpe was rescheduled and run on the July Course at Newmarket on 22 August. Ridden by Pat Cosgrave, he started at odds of 12/1 in a fourteen-runner field. The King's Stand Stakes winner Equiano started favourite ahead of Kingsgate Native, who had won the race as a juvenile in 2007. The other contenders were Sakhee's Secret, Dandy Man (Palace House Stakes), National Colour (a multiple Grade One-winning mare from South Africa), Benbaun (Prix de l'Abbaye), Captain Gerrard (Cornwallis Stakes, Palace House Stakes), Percolator (Prix du Bois), Flashmans Papers (Windsor Castle Stakes), Prime Defender (European Free Handicap, Sandy Lane Stakes), Moorhouse Lad (King George Stakes), Desert Lord and Shryl. Borderlescott tracked the leaders as Captain Gerrard set the pace before National Colour went to the front two furlongs out. The gelding overhauled the South African mare inside the final furlong to win by half a length with Kingsgate Native taking third ahead of Equiano and Benbaun.

In October, the gelding was sent to France for the Group One Prix de l'Abbaye over 1000 metres at Longchamp Racecourse. He finished third behind Marchand d'Or and Moorhouse Lad with Fleeting Spirit, National Colour and Equiano among the unplaced horses. Three weeks later, Borderlescott ended his season in the Listed Mercury Stakes on the Polytrack course at Dundalk. Starting the 4/5 favourite under a weight of 143 pounds, he took the lead a furlong out and won by a neck from the three-year-old filly Invincible Ash. Bastiman commented "He did his job. He's only a little horse to carry 10-3 but he's so tough and genuine. Remember, he had to run twice at Longchamp but he picked up well and was game".

=== 2009: seven-year-old season ===
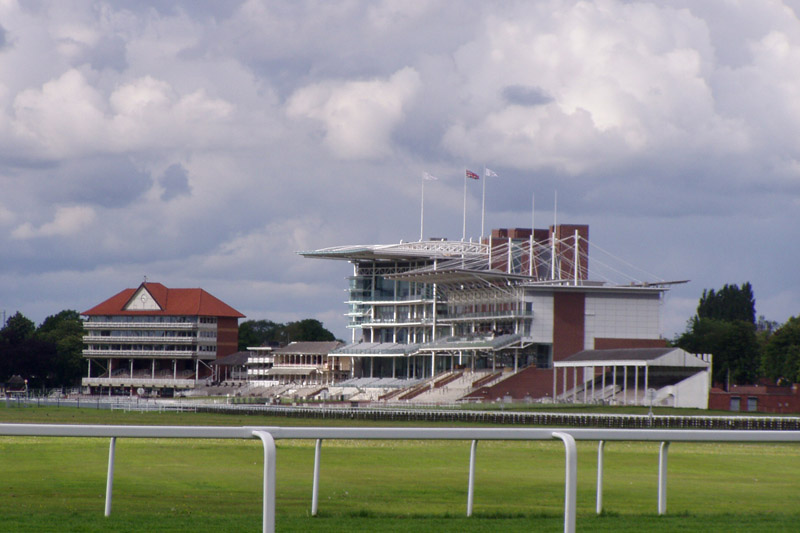
York Racecourse, where Borderlescott won his second Nunthorpe Stakes

Borderlescott began his 2009 campaign on 2 May in the Palace House Stakes at Newmarket and finished third behind Amour Propre and Hoh Hoh Hoh. Later that month he started 2/1 favourite for the Temple Stakes, but in a three-way photo-finish he was beaten a neck by Look Busy, with Wid Dud a head away in third. At Royal Ascot in June he started at odds of 10/1 for the King's Stand Stakes and finished fifth of the fifteen runners behind the Australian gelding Scenic Blast. On 11 July Borderlescott was dropped in class for the Listed City Walls Stakes over five furlongs at Chester and started 6/5 favourite. He started well but then lost his position and looked unlikely to obtain a clear run at half way before accelerating in the straight, taking the lead inside the final furlong and winning by a length and a neck from Captain Gerrard and Hoh Hoh Hoh.

At Goodwood, Borderlescott started favourite for the King George Stakes but looked to be outpaced in the closing stages and finished fourth behind Kingsgate Native, Total Gallery and Inxile. It was Cosgrave's last ride on the gelding, with Neil Callan taking over when Borderlescott attempted to repeat his 2008 success in the Nunthorpe Stakes on 21 August. He was the 9/1 fourth choice in the betting behind Kingsgate Native, Radiohead (Norfolk Stakes) and Amour Propre, whilst the other runners included Tax Free (Prix du Gros Chêne, Prix du Petit Couvert), Dandy Man, Ialysos (Coral Charge), Equiano, Art Connoisseur (Golden Jubilee Stakes), Look Busy, Moorhouse Lad, Benbaun, Captain Gerrard and the South African challenger Mythical Flight. The runners split into groups across the wide straight with Borderlescott racing down the centre of the course before switching to the right in last quarter mile. He overtook Benbaun inside the final furlong and won by a neck, with Radiohead taking third ahead of Tax Free and Amour Propre. After the race, Bastiman said "It's brilliant to win on our home ground. We're only eight miles away, so it's just the job. He comes right at this time of year and I keep telling everybody that. He likes that fast pace and got a nice lead today". Callan said "It's a fabulous buzz. He jumped real quick and once I got him out it took about 100 yards, then the turbo kicked in and he went there easy with hands and heels".

In October he was sent to France for another attempt at the Prix de l'Abbaye and finished sixth, two lengths behind the winner Total Gallery. On his final appearance of the season he was sent to contest the Hong Kong Sprint at Sha Tin Racecourse in December. He started an 83/1 outsider and finished unplaced behind the local champion Sacred Kingdom.

=== 2010–2012: later career and first retirement ===
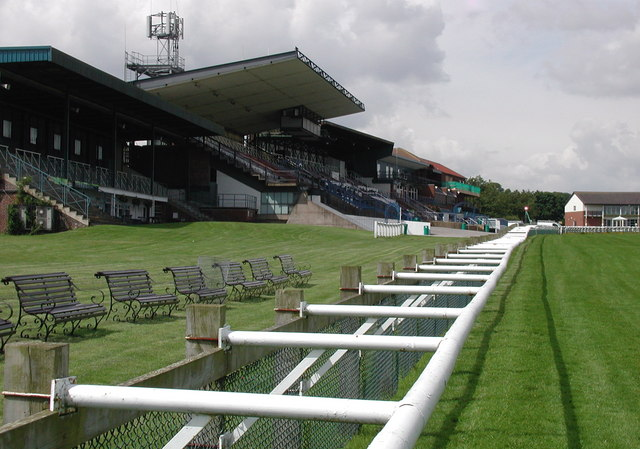
Beverley Racecourse, where Borderlescott won his last big race

As an eight-year-old in 2010, Borderlescott finished second to Equiano in the Palace House Stakes and third to Kingsgate Native in the Temple Stakes before finishing third to Equiano and Markab in the King's Stand Stakes. He then started odds on favourite for the City Wall Stakes but finished third, beaten a hort head and a neck by Blue Jack and Captain Dunne. Kieren Fallon took the ride when the gelding started 9/2 favourite for the King George Stakes at Goodwood on 29 July. Captain Dunne, Amour Propre and Moorhouse Lad were in the field as well as the Todd Pletcher-trained American mare Starish Bay, and the improving handicappers Astrophysical Jet and Tropical Treat. After tracking the leaders for most of the way, Borderlescott produced a decisive burst of acceleration to take the lead inside the final furlong and won by half a length and a head from Group Therapy and Astrophysical Jet. In August, the gelding attempted to equal the achievement of Tag End and Sharpo by winning a third consecutive Nunthorpe Stakes. Ridden by Callan, he started at odds of 11/1 and finished sixth of the twelve runners behind Sole Power. In the Haydock Sprint Cup two weeks later he chased the leaders before weakening in the closing stages and finishing eighth behind Markab.

Borderlescott had his least active season in 2011 when he failed to win in three races. He finished fifth in the Palace House Stakes, fourth in the Temple Stakes and ninth in the City Wall Stakes.

In 2012 the ten-year-old finished unplaced on his first two starts before finishing second in minor race at Chester. He then finished fourth in the Temple Stakes, sixth in the Midsummer Stakes at Cork and second in the Summer Cup at Thirsk. In August he made yet another attempt to win the Stewards' Cup and finished ninth behind Hawkeyethenoo under a weight of 135 pounds. On 1 September he was ridden by Frederik Tylicki when he contested the ninth running of the Listed Beverley Bullet Sprint Stakes over five furlongs at Beverley Racecourse. Starting at odds of 8/1 he tracked the leaders before taking the lead a furlong out and winning by a length from the favourite Masamah. After the race Bastiman said "It's great to see him back, the ground came right for him. It was a mistake to run him in Ireland because he came back stiff. He wasn't right at Thirsk next time and the ground came up too loose on top for him in the Stewards' Cup, and he's probably not as good over six furlongs anyway." The gelding made no impact in his three subsequent races that year, finishing unplaced in the Ayr Gold Cup, Prix de l'Abbaye and Mercury Stakes.

In November 2012 it was announced that Borderlescott was to be retired from racing. Bastiman said "He's almost 11 now and I was just a little worried with the way he ran last time in Ireland. He wasn't too clever afterwards and his heart was beating ten to the dozen. No matter what he's always run as hard as he can and tried his heart out. He's roughed up and out in the paddock now, happy. He's a very popular horse and he gets plenty of cards from people and things like boxes of polo mints. The crowd at Beverley loved him."

=== 2013–2015: comeback and second retirement ===
Borderlescott's retirement was short-lived, as he returned to the track as an eleven-year-old in 2013. Robin Bastiman explained "He had a long season last year, and I don't think he was quite right in Ireland. But my daughter was messing around with him during the winter and we thought: 'Come on, let's check his heart and see if he's 100 per cent.' They're creatures of habit, they get into a routine. And he's a one-off, this horse. He wants to win. That's what sets him apart from all the others I've had". He failed to win in seven races but produced several good performances in defeat, producing his best effort when taking third place behind Stepper Point in the Beverley Bullet.

On his debut as a twelve-year-old the gelding was sent to Musselburgh for a race named in his honour, the Borderlescott Sprint Trophy. He took the lead inside the final furlong but was caught in the last stride and beaten a short head by the four-year-old Smoothtalkinrascal. He finished unplaced in his next six races (including a final bid for the Stewards' Cup) before ending the year with a second place at Musselburgh in October.

In 2015 Borderlecott was trained by Robin Bastiman's daughter Rebecca. On his first appearance of the year he again finished second in his own race at Musselburgh, beaten one and a quarter lengths by his fellow veteran Tangerine Trees. In May he finished fourth in a handicap at Goodwood and third in a similar event at Nottingham. On his eighty-fifth and final appearance, Borderlescott finished fifth of the six runners in a handicap at Ayr on 20 June. His second retirement was announced on 1 July. Rebecca Bastiman said: "He's been putting so much into his races, he was blowing hard after [his final race]. He's now in a field enjoying himself." Robin Bastiman said: "It's a shame but I'd hate for anything to happen to him. He's trying too hard and it's not fair on him. He's been a fantastic horse and he still goes out with all the other horses. He wasn't bad for 13,000gns as a yearling."

== Pedigree ==
Pedigree of Borderlescott, bay gelding, 2002
Sire Compton Place (GB) 1994	Indian Ridge (IRE); 1985	Ahonoora	Lorenzaccio
Sire Compton Place (GB) 1994	Indian Ridge (IRE); 1985	Ahonoora	Helen Nichols
Sire Compton Place (GB) 1994	Indian Ridge (IRE); 1985	Hillbrow	Swing Easy
Sire Compton Place (GB) 1994	Indian Ridge (IRE); 1985	Hillbrow	Golden City
Sire Compton Place (GB) 1994	Nosey (IRE); 1981	Nebbiolo	Yellow God
Sire Compton Place (GB) 1994	Nosey (IRE); 1981	Nebbiolo	Novara
Sire Compton Place (GB) 1994	Nosey (IRE); 1981	Little Cynthia	Wolver Hollow
Sire Compton Place (GB) 1994	Nosey (IRE); 1981	Little Cynthia	Fazilka
Dam Jeewan (IRE) 1985	Touching Wood (USA); 1979	Roberto	Hail To Reason
Dam Jeewan (IRE) 1985	Touching Wood (USA); 1979	Roberto	Bramalea
Dam Jeewan (IRE) 1985	Touching Wood (USA); 1979	Mandera	Vaguely Noble
Dam Jeewan (IRE) 1985	Touching Wood (USA); 1979	Mandera	Foolish One
Dam Jeewan (IRE) 1985	Adeebah (USA); 1980	Damascus	Sword Dancer
Dam Jeewan (IRE) 1985	Adeebah (USA); 1980	Damascus	Kerala
Dam Jeewan (IRE) 1985	Adeebah (USA); 1980	Transylvania	Bold Ruler
Dam Jeewan (IRE) 1985	Adeebah (USA); 1980	Transylvania	Cascade (Family: 14-c)
