= Sprint Stakes =

Sprint Stakes (Coral Charge)
- Class: Group 3
- Location: Sandown Park; Esher, England
- Race type: Flat / Thoroughbred
- Sponsor: Coral
- Website: Sandown Park

Race information
- Distance: 5f 10y (1,015 metres)
- Surface: Turf
- Track: Straight
- Qualification: Three-years-old and up
- Weight: 9 st 0 lb (3yo); 9 st 5 lb (4yo+); Allowances; 3 lb for fillies and mares Penalties; 7 lb for Group 1 winners * 5 lb for Group 2 winners * 3 lb for Group 3 winners * * after 2024 (2yo wins not penalised)
- Purse: £85,000 (2025); 1st: £48,204

Sprint Stakes
2026
| Rumstar | Luna A Inbhir Nis | Partisan Hero |

Previous years
2025
Rumstar | She's Quality | Shagraan
2024
Makarova | Purosangue | Desperate Hero
2023
Equality | Makarova | Tiber Flow
2022
Raasel | Mitbaahy | Method
2021
Came From The Dark | Arecibo | Happy Romance

2020-2011
2020
A'Ali | Liberty Beach | Tinto
2019
Kurious | Garrus | Caspian Prince
2018
Judicial | Muthmir | Mirza
2017
Battaash | Mirza | Goldream
2016
Brando | Monsieur Joe | Jane's Memory
2015
Waady | Wind Fire | Spirit Quartz
2014
Extortionist | Kingsgate Native | Dinkum Diamond
2013
Tickled Pink | Kingsgate Native | Mince
2012
Caledonia Lady | Confessional | Free Zone
2011
Night Carnation | Beyond Desire | Humidor

2010-2001
2010
Triple Aspect | Group Therapy | Bould Mover
2009
Ialysos | Triple Aspect | Masta Plasta
2008
Ancien Regime | Prime Defender | Hoh Mike
2007
Hoh Mike | Wi Dud | Bond City
2006
Pivotal Point | Benbaun | The Trader
2005
Resplendent Glory | Lafi | The Tatling
2004
Orientor | Ringmoor Down | Colonel Cotton
2003
The Tatling | Bali Royal | Vision Of Night
2002
Palace Affair | Boleyn Castle | Indian Prince
2001
Misraah | Alegranza | Astonished

2000-1991
2000
Watching | Lord Kintyre | Repertory
1999
Cortachy Castle | Flanders | Dashing Blue
1998
Fire Dome | Bishops Court | Easycall
1997
Ya Malak | Struggler | Cathedral
1996
Eveningperformance | Venture Capitalist | Croft Pool
1995
Bunty Boo | Saint Express | Warning Star
1994
Up And At 'Em | Lake Coniston | Mistertopogigo
1993
Lochsong | Bunty Boo | Lucky Parkes
1992
Medaille D'Or | Tbab | Bold Lez
1991
Case Law | Furajet | Montendre

1990-1988
1990
Night At Sea | Boozy | Rivers Rhapsody
1989
Desert Dawn | Almost Blue | Perion
1988
Silver Fling | Princess Athena | Poyle George

The Sprint Stakes is a Group 3 flat horse race in Great Britain open to horses aged three years or older. It is run at Sandown Park over a distance of 5 furlongs and 10 yards (1,015 metres), and it is scheduled to take place each year in early July.

The event is held on the same afternoon as Sandown Park's most prestigious flat race, the Eclipse Stakes.

The race was run for the first time in 1986 as the Trafalgar House Sprint Stakes, at Listed level, and it was promoted to Group 3 status in 2004.

The long-term sponsors of the Eclipse Stakes, Coral, have sponsored the Sprint Stakes in 2009. It is now known as the Coral Charge.

== Records ==
Most successful horse since 1986: (2 wins)

- Rumstar - (2025, 2026)

Leading jockey since 1986 (3 wins):

- Frankie Dettori – Lochsong (1993), Ancien Regime (2008), A'Ali (2020)

Leading trainer since 1986 (2 wins):

- Ian Balding – Silver Fling (1988), Lochsong (1993)
- Luca Cumani – Night at Sea (1990), Ialysos (2009)
- Richard Hannon Sr. – Bunty Boo (1995), Watching (2000)
- David Nicholls – Ya Malak (1997), Fire Dome (1998)
- Charles Hills – Battaash (2017), Equality (2023)
- Ed Walker – Came From The Dark (2021), Makarova (2024)
- Jonathan Portman - Rumstar (2025, 2026)

== Winners ==
| Year | Winner | Age | Jockey | Trainer | Time |
|---|---|---|---|---|---|
| 1986 | Polykratis | 4 | Chris Rutter | Merrick Francis | 1:00.74 |
| 1987 | Perion | 5 | Pat Eddery | Geoff Lewis | 1:00.49 |
| 1988 | Silver Fling | 3 | John Matthias | Ian Balding | 1:01.50 |
| 1989 | Desert Dawn | 3 | Richard Hills | Lord John FitzGerald | 1:00.39 |
| 1990 | Night at Sea | 3 | Basil Marcus | Luca Cumani | 1:01.02 |
| 1991 | Case Law | 4 | George Duffield | Sir Mark Prescott | 1:01.95 |
| 1992 | Medaille d'Or | 4 | Alan Munro | Pip Payne | 1:02.55 |
| 1993 | Lochsong | 5 | Frankie Dettori | Ian Balding | 1:00.32 |
| 1994 | Up and at 'Em | 4 | Gary Carter | Jack Berry | 1:00.99 |
| 1995 | Bunty Boo | 6 | Michael Kinane | Richard Hannon Sr. | 1:00.00 |
| 1996 | Eveningperformance | 5 | Chris Rutter | Henry Candy | 0:59.74 |
| 1997 | Ya Malak | 6 | Alex Greaves | David Nicholls | 1:01.69 |
| 1998 | Fire Dome | 6 | Alex Greaves | David Nicholls | 1:02.89 |
| 1999 | Cortachy Castle | 4 | Darryll Holland | Brian Meehan | 1:00.35 |
| 2000 | Watching | 3 | Dane O'Neill | Richard Hannon Sr. | 1:00.21 |
| 2001 | Misraah | 4 | Richard Hills | Sir Michael Stoute | 0:59.63 |
| 2002 | Palace Affair | 4 | Stephen Carson | Toby Balding | 1:03.83 |
| 2003 | The Tatling | 6 | Darryll Holland | Milton Bradley | 1:00.34 |
| 2004 | Orientor | 6 | Kieren Fallon | Jim Goldie | 1:02.38 |
| 2005 | Resplendent Glory | 3 | Shane Kelly | Terry Mills | 1:01.27 |
| 2006 | Pivotal Point | 6 | Seb Sanders | Peter Makin | 1:00.83 |
| 2007 | Hoh Mike | 3 | Jamie Spencer | Michael Bell | 1:01.89 |
| 2008 | Ancien Régime | 3 | Frankie Dettori | Michael Jarvis | 1:00.40 |
| 2009 | Ialysos | 5 | Christophe Lemaire | Luca Cumani | 1:00.17 |
| 2010 | Triple Aspect | 4 | Liam Jones | William Haggas | 0:59.47 |
| 2011 | Night Carnation | 3 | Jimmy Fortune | Andrew Balding | 0:59.68 |
| 2012 | Caledonia Lady | 3 | Hayley Turner | Jo Hughes | 1:01.33 |
| 2013 | Tickled Pink | 4 | Tom Queally | Lady Cecil | 0:59.27 |
| 2014 | Extortionist | 3 | Ryan Moore | Olly Stevens | 0:59.86 |
| 2015 | Waady | 3 | Paul Hanagan | John Gosden | 1:00.40 |
| 2016 | Brando | 4 | Tom Eaves | Kevin Ryan | 1:03.28 |
| 2017 | Battaash | 3 | Dane O'Neill | Charles Hills | 0:58.57 |
| 2018 | Judicial | 6 | Paul Mulrennan | Julie Camacho | 0:59.72 |
| 2019 | Kurious | 3 | Harry Bentley | Henry Candy | 0:59.23 |
| 2020 | A'Ali | 3 | Frankie Dettori | Simon & Ed Crisford | 1:00.43 |
| 2021 | Came From The Dark | 5 | Tom Marquand | Ed Walker | 1:02.94 |
| 2022 | Raasel | 5 | James Doyle | Michael Appleby | 1:00.73 |
| 2023 | Equality | 5 | William Buick | Charles Hills | 1:00.16 |
| 2024 | Makarova | 5 | Hector Crouch | Ed Walker | 1:02.87 |
| 2025 | Rumstar | 5 | Rob Hornby | Jonathan Portman | 0:59.63 |
| 2026 | Rumstar | 6 | Rob Hornby | Jonathan Portman | 1:00.38 |

== See also ==
- Horse racing in Great Britain
- List of British flat horse races
