= Scarbrough Stakes =

Discontinued flat horse race in Britain

- Class: Listed
- Location: Doncaster Racecourse; Doncaster, England
- Final run: 2023
- Race type: Flat / Thoroughbred
- Sponsor: Cazoo
- Website: Doncaster

Race information
- Distance: 5f 3y (1,008 metres)
- Surface: Turf
- Track: Straight
- Qualification: Two-years-old and up excl G1 / G2 winners after 31 March
- Weight: 8 st 7 lb (2yo); 10 st 0 lb (3yo); 10 st 1 lb (4yo+); Allowances; 5 lb for fillies and mares Penalties; 5 lb for Group 3 winners * 3 lb for Listed winners * * after 31 March
- Purse: £60,000 (2022); 1st: £34,026

Scarbrough Stakes
2023
Rogue Lightning	Raasel	Silky Wilkie

Previous years
2022
Manaccan	Mo Celita	Attagirl
2021
Khaadem	Live In The Moment	Tarboosh

2020-2011
2020
Tarboosh	Urban Beat	Dakota Gold
2019
Equilateral	Queens Gift	Duke Of Firenze
2018
Global Applause	El Astronaute	Encore d'Or
2017
Encore d'Or	Razzmatazz	Go On Go On Go On
2016
Priceless	Thesme	Equimou
2015
Cotai Glory	Kingsgate Native	Speed Hawk
2014
Mecca's Angel	Reckless Abandon	Steps
2013
Justineo	Masamah	Judge 'n Jury
2012
Sole Power	Jwala	Excelette
2011
Humidor	Dinkum Diamond	Medicean Man

2010-2001
2010
Prohibit	Rose Blossom	Group Therapy
2009
Strike The Deal	Spin Cycle	Above Limits
2008
Galeota	Loch Verdi	Moorhouse Lad
2007
Galeota	Peace Offering	Conquest
2006
Celtic Mill	Orientor	Strike Up The Band
2005
Majestic Missile	Texas Gold	Celtic Mill
2004
Celtic Mill	Talbot Avenue	Caribbean Coral
2003
Dubaian Gift	Fire Up The Band	Bishops Court
2002
Bishops Court	Olivia Grace	Saddad
2001
Astonished	Autumnal	Misty Eyed

2000-1991
2000
Lord Kintyre	See You Later	Rambling Bear
1999
Flanders	Emma Peel	Dashing Blue
1998
Easycall	Bishops Court	Dashing Blue
1997
Bollin Joanne	Almaty	Carmine Lake
1996
Anzio	Amazing Bay	Brave Edge
1995
Eveningperformance	Double Quick	Double QuickI
1994
Mistertopogigo	Crofters Ceilidh	Imperial Bailiwick
1993
Marina Park	King's Signet	Rain Brother
1992
Notley	Harvest Girl	Blyton Lad
1991
Notley	Northern Goddess	Blyton Lad

1990-1988
1990
Rivers Rhapsody	Never In The Red	Our Freddie
1989
Statoblest	Green's Canaletto	Access Travel
1988
Perfect Timing	Princess Athena	Ever Sharp

The Scarbrough Stakes was a Listed flat horse race in Great Britain open to horses aged two years or older. It was run at Doncaster Racecourse over a distance of 5 furlongs and 3 yards (1,008 metres), and was scheduled to take place each year in September. It was removed from the pattern race programme by the British Horseracing Authority in 2024.

== Records ==
Most successful horse since 1975 (2 wins):

- Epsom Imp - 1978, 1979
- Soba - 1982, 1983
- Notley – 1991, 1992
- Celtic Mill – 2004, 2006
- Galeota – 2007, 2008

Leading jockey since 1975 (5 wins):

- Ryan Moore – Galeota (2007, 2008), Encore D'Or (2017), Equilateral (2019), Manaccan (2022)

Leading trainer since 1975 (4 wins):

- Richard Hannon Sr. – Notley (1991, 1992), Galeota (2007, 2008)

== Winners ==
Year	Winner	Age	Jockey	Trainer	Time
1975	Polly Peachum	4	Eddie Hide	Mick Easterby	0:59.73
1976	Athlete's Foot	2	Willie Carson	Paddy Prendergast	1:01.53
1977	Jameson	3	Walter Wharton Jr.	Walter Wharton	1:00.17
1978	Epsom Imp	5	Lester Piggott	Jack Holt	1:01.03
1979	Epsom Imp	6	John Reid	Jack Holt	1:00.98
1980	Sayyaf	3	Tony Ives	Bill O'Gorman	1:01.09
1981	Hello Cuddles	2	Nicky Carlisle	Reg Hollinshead	1:00.76
1982	Soba	3	David Nicholls	David Chapman	1:00.76
1983	Soba	4	David Nicholls	David Chapman	1:00.42
1984	Prince Reymo	4	Lester Piggott	Robert Armstrong	1:00.40
1985	Storm Warning	3	Lester Piggott	William Hastings-Bass	0:59.97
1986	Treasure Kay	3	Pat Eddery	Peter Makin	0:59.74
1987	Sizzling Melody	3	Richard Hills	Lord John FitzGerald	1:00.74
1988	Perfect Timing	6	Gary Carter	Gerald Cottrell	0:59.36
1989	Statoblest	3	Ray Cochrane	Luca Cumani	1:00.63
1990	Rivers Rhapsody	3	John Williams	Toby Balding	1:01.42
1991	Notley	4	Bruce Raymond	Richard Hannon Sr.	0:59.00
1992	Notley	5	Bruce Raymond	Richard Hannon Sr.	1:00.29
1993	Marina Park	3	Frankie Dettori	Mark Johnston	1:00.35
1993	King's Signet	4	Michael Roberts	John Gosden	1:00.35
1994	Mistertopogigo	4	Kevin Darley	Bobby Beasley	1:00.43
1995	Eveningperformance	4	Billy Newnes	Henry Candy	0:58.80
1996	Anzio	5	Ray Cochrane	Gay Kelleway	0:59.80
1997	Bollin Joanne	4	Kieren Fallon	Tim Easterby	0:58.05
1998	Easycall	4	Mark Tebbutt	Brian Meehan	1:00.02
1999	Flanders	3	Lindsay Charnock	Tim Easterby	1:00.52
2000	Lord Kintyre	5	Michael Roberts	Rod Millman	0:59.76
2001	Astonished	5	Kieren Fallon	Lynda Ramsden	1:00.75
2002	Bishops Court	8	Frankie Dettori	Lynda Ramsden	0:58.29
2003	Dubaian Gift	4	Martin Dwyer	Andrew Balding	1:01.90
2004	Celtic Mill	6	Frankie Dettori	David Barker	0:57.28
2005	Majestic Missile	4	Jamie Spencer	William Haggas	0:57.74
2006	Celtic Mill	8	Darryll Holland	David Barker	0:58.50
2007	Galeota	5	Ryan Moore	Richard Hannon Sr.	0:57.77
2008	Galeota	6	Ryan Moore	Richard Hannon Sr.	1:01.84
2009	Strike the Deal	4	Kieren Fallon	Jeremy Noseda	0:57.49
2010	Prohibit	5	Jamie Spencer	Robert Cowell	0:58.09
2011	Humidor	4	Frankie Dettori	George Baker	0:59.48
2012	Sole Power	5	Johnny Murtagh	Edward Lynam	0:58.69
2013	Justineo	4	William Buick	Roger Varian	0:59.92
2014	Mecca's Angel	3	Paul Mulrennan	Michael Dods	0:57.73
2015	Cotai Glory	3	George Baker	Charles Hills	0:57.85
2016	Priceless	3	Silvestre de Sousa	Clive Cox	0:58.85
2017	Encore D'Or	5	Ryan Moore	Robert Cowell	1:01.91
2018	Global Applause	4	Gerald Mosse	Robert Cowell	0:59.78
2019	Equilateral	4	Ryan Moore	Charles Hills	0:59.23
2020	Tarboosh	7	Kevin Stott	Paul Midgley	0:58.95
2021	Khaadem	5	William Buick	Charles Hills	0:57.30
2022	Manaccan	3	Ryan Moore	John Ryan	0:58.47
2023	Rogue Lightning	3	Daniel Tudhope	Tom Clover	0:59.33

== See also ==
- Horse racing in Great Britain
- List of British flat horse races
