= Jimmy Quinn (jockey) =

Irish horse racing flat jockey

James Quinn (born 20 May 1967) is an Irish professional horse racing flat jockey.

Jimmy Quinn riding Cubswin at Newmarket, August 2019

Quinn was born in Rochestown, New Ross, County Wexford, Ireland. He moved to England as an apprentice jockey in 1985 and works as a freelance jockey based in Newmarket.

In four seasons (1996, 2002, 2004 and 2009) Quinn clocked up over 1,000 rides. In an interview with The Guardian in 2006, he defended the practice of riding in afternoon and evening race meetings on the same day, even if it meant driving long distances between meetings. He described his career in the following terms: "I know I'm not one of the really top jockeys. But I've built a really good career as a successful lightweight jockey. I've got a nice car and a nice family home. I've worked hard for it. I have a reputation for working hard and if the ride is good enough I will go to wherever it is".

Quinn's most successful season in terms of winners came in 2002, when he had 101 winning rides. By August 2019 he had had over 17,000 British rides, with a strike rate (wins to rides) of 7.54 per cent, including 12 Group and Listed wins. One of the highlights of his career came in 2007 when he won the Nunthorpe Stakes at York Racecourse with Kingsgate Native. A notable win in handicap races came on Case Key in the Grey Horse Handicap at Newmarket in August 2019.

Quinn has also spent some time riding in Hong Kong and Germany. He was offered the position of stable jockey to Hong Kong trainer Brian Kan for the 1999-2000 season, but Kan ended the partnership before the end of the season and Quinn continued to race as a freelance, winning a total of 24 races, including the first race of the new millennium anywhere in the world. However in May 2000 he lost his licence to race in Hong Kong for the rest of the season after vandalising Kan's car.

Quinn also received a six month ban from racing in Britain in 2011, when he was one of four jockeys, along with two owners and five others, found guilty of corruption by a British Horseracing Authority (BHA) investigation. Quinn's solicitor was quoted as saying that Quinn had not been found to have stopped horses in races and that in "giving him a six-month ban they have given him the minimum amount open to them and that reflects the panel's view of him."

Quinn lives with wife Zoe in the village of Cheveley near Newmarket. Son Josh Quinn is an apprentice jockey and work rider for trainer Julie Camacho in Yorkshire.
