= Ayr Gold Cup =

Flat horse race in Britain

- Class: Handicap
- Location: Ayr Racecourse; Ayr, Ayrshire, Scotland
- Inaugurated: 1804
- Race type: Flat / Thoroughbred
- Sponsor: Ladbrokes
- Website: Ayr

Race information
- Distance: 6f (1,207 metres)
- Surface: Turf
- Track: Straight
- Qualification: Three-years-old and up
- Weight: Handicap
- Purse: £180,000 (2025); 1st: £92,772

Ayr Gold Cup
2026
Pellitory	Tuco Salamanca	Flash Harry

Previous years
2025
Run Boy Run	Desert Falcon	Jubilee Walk
2024
Lethal Levi	Silky Wilkie	Korker
2023
Significantly	Ramazan	Gweedore
2022
Summerghand	Commanche Falls	Juan Les Pins
2021
Bielsa	Great Ambassador	Mr Wagyu

2020-2011
2020
Nahaarr	Spanish City	Mr Lupton
2019
Angel Alexander	Growl	Gulliver
2018
Son Of Rest	Baron Bolt	Flying Pursuit
2016
Brando	Growl	Hoof It
2015
Don't Touch	Poyle Vinnie	Ninjago
2014
Louis The Pious	Minalisa	Blaine
2013
Highland Colori	Louis The Pious	Jack Dexter
2012
Captain Ramius	Regal Parade	Maarek
2011
Our Jonathan	Eton Rifles	Son Of The Cat

2010-2001
2010
Redford	Victoire De Lyphar	Hitchens
2009
Jimmy Styles	Barney McGrew	Knot In Wood
2008
Regal Parade	Tajneed	Confuchias
2007
Advanced	Benwilt Breeze	Patavellian
2006
Fonthill Road	Borderlescott	Advanced
2005
Presto Shinko	Fonthill Road	Majestic Times
2004
Funfair Wane	Fantasy Believer	Continent
2003
Quito	Seel of Approval	Fire Up The Band
2002
Funfair Wane	The Tatling	Abbajabba
2001
Continent	Brevity	Smokin Beau

2000-1991
2000
Bahamian Pirate	Lago Di Varano	Guinea Hunter
1999
Grangeville	Evening Promise	Royal Result
1998
Always Alight	Daring Destiny	Lago Di Varano
1997
Wildwood Flower	Double Action	Superior Premium
1996
Coastal Bluff	Mr Bergerac	Prince Babar
1995
Royale Figurine	No Extras	Patto
1994
Daring Destiny	Alzianah	Hard To Figure
1993
Hard To Figure	Truthful Image	Venture Capitalist
1992
Lochsong	Echo-Logical	Heather Bank
1991
Sarcita	Tbab	Dominuet

1990-1988
1990
Final Shot	Bertie Wooster	Local Lass
1989
Joveworth	Chaplins Club	Ajanac
1988
So Careful	Chaplins Club	Foolish Touch

The Ayr Gold Cup is a flat handicap horse race in Great Britain open to thoroughbreds aged three years or older. It is run at Ayr over a distance of 6 furlongs (1,207 metres), and it is scheduled to take place each year in September.

== History ==
The event was established in 1804, and it was originally held at Ayr's former racecourse at Belleisle. In the early part of its history it was restricted to horses bred and trained in Scotland. It was initially contested over two separate heats of two miles, and was subsequently a single race with a two-mile distance.

The Ayr Gold Cup became a handicap in 1855, and it was shortened to about a mile in 1870. The Belleisle track closed in 1907, and the race was relocated and cut to 6 furlongs in 1908.

The lightest winning weight in the race since it became a sprint is 6 st 13 lb (44 kg). This was carried to victory by Marmaduke Jinks in 1936. The heaviest is 10 st (63½ kg), the burden of Roman Warrior in 1975. The latter horse, trained at Ayr by Nigel Angus, is the most recent winner trained in Scotland.

The field for the Ayr Gold Cup is formed from the highest-weighted horses entered for the race. The maximum number of runners is currently twenty-five. Those eliminated are now offered the chance to compete in the Ayr Silver Cup, a consolation race introduced in 1992. An event for horses excluded from that race, the Ayr Bronze Cup, was established in 2009.

== Records ==
Most successful horse (3 wins):

- Dazzle – 1889, 1890, 1891

Leading jockey (4 wins):

- Tom Nicholson – Dominie Skelp (1827), Brunswick (1830), Gondolier (1831), Masetto (1834)
- William Noble – Despot (1836), The Doctor (1840), The Recorder (1842), The Shadow (1843)

(note: the jockeys of some of the early winners are unknown)

Leading trainer (15 wins):

- Tom Dawson – Inheritor (1835, 1838), Despot (1836, 1837), The Doctor (1840), Doctor Caius (1841), The Recorder (1842), The Shadow (1843, 1844), Inheritress (1845, 1846), Stilton (1852), Itch (1854), Tabouret (1868), Good Hope (1869)

(note: the trainers of some of the early winners are unknown)

== Winners since 1908 ==
- Weights given in stones and pounds.

Year	Winner	Age	Weight	Jockey	Trainer	SP	Time
1908	Raeberry	3	8-03	Richard Crisp	M'Gregor	5/1
1909	Alwine	4	7-06	Jim Clark	Percy Bewicke	11/2
1910	Raeberry	5	9-10	Charles Ringstead	M'Gregor	11/2
1911	Saucy John	6	8-00	Walter Griggs	N H Scott	100/8
1912	Grammont	4	9-00	Steve Donoghue	Jack Fallon	4/1
1913	Borrow	5	9-00	Skeets Martin	Jack Joyner	7/2 JF
1914-16	no race
1917	Wayward	3	7-11	Arthur Smith	J Day	100/7
1918	no race
1919	Beresina	3	8-06	Bernard Carslake	George Lambton	7/4 F
1920	Forest Guard	7	8-09	Tommy Burns Sr.	James Burns	6/1
1921	Self Sacrifice	3	6-13	Robert Lynch	Bazley	20/1
1922	Soldennis	4	8-12	Charlie Elliott	George Dundas	Evens F
1923	Baydon	4	7-02	Jim Stanton	Fergusson	100/6
1924	Westmead	5	7-11	Richard Perryman	Charles Elsey	100/6
1925	Phalaros	3	8-07	Tommy Weston	George Lambton	6/4 F
1926	Lord Wembley	3	7-11	Steve Donoghue	John Staunton	8/1
1927	Martenax	5	8-10	Joseph Taylor	Dobson Peacock	10/1
1928	Nothing Venture	5	9-05	Jack Leach	Felix Leach	10/1
1929	Tommy Atkins	5	8-13	Henry Leach	Felix Leach	5/1 F
1930	Heronslea	3	8-06	Joseph Taylor	Dobson Peacock	5/1	1:14.60
1931	Heronslea	4	9-11	Joseph Taylor	Dobson Peacock	8/1	1:12.40
1932	Solenoid	3	8-09	Joseph Marshall	Poole	7/1	1:13.60
1933	Ken Hill	9	7-08	Enos Fox	T Green	10/1
1934	Figaro	4	9-01	Henri Jellis	Jack Leach	7/2
1935	Greenore	6	9-03	Sam Wragg	Ossie Bell	5/1 F	1:14.20
1936	Marmaduke Jinks	4	6-13	Albert Richardson	Harry Peacock	20/1	1:15.60
1937	Daytona	4	9-00	Michael Beary	Jack Jarvis	100/8	1:12.80
1938	Old Reliance	3	9-02	Eph Smith	Jack Jarvis	8/1
1939–45	no race
1946	Royal Charger	4	9-07	Eph Smith	Jack Jarvis	2/1 F	1:13.00
1947	Kilbelin	4	7-13	Harry Carr	Bertie Bullock	6/1	Not taken
1948	Como	6	8-09	Joseph Marshall	Gerald Armstrong	10/1
1949	Irish Dance	6	9-01	Edgar Britt	Harry Whiteman	4/1 F	1:12.80
1950	First Consul	4	9-07	Charlie Smirke	Sam Armstrong	2/1 F	1:15.80
1951	Fair Seller	5	9-04	Ron Sheather	Ernie Davey	10/1	1:11.40
1952	Vatellus	4	8-07	Herbert Jones	J Pearce	10/1	1:13.20
1953	Blue Butterfly	4	8-09	Manny Mercer	Harry Wragg	11/2	1:12.20
1954	Orthopaedic	3	8-01	Jimmy Lindley	Towser Gosden	11/2	1:19.80
1955	Hook Money	4	7-11	Bill Elliott	Arthur Budgett	4/1 F	1:11.20
1956	Precious Heather	4	7-07	Eddie Hide	Towser Gosden	5/1	1:11.40
1957	Jacintha	6	7-07	Eddie Larkin	Wilfred Lyde	100/7	1:13.06
1958	Rhythmic	3	8-05	Frankie Durr	Bill Dutton	20/1	1:14.90
1959	Whistling Victor	3	7-08	Joe Sime	G Laurence	7/1	1:10.82
1960	Dawn Watch	5	7-02	Cliff Parkes	Eric Cousins	100/9	1:11.76
1961	Klondyke Bill	3	8-07	Eph Smith	John Benstead	100/8	1:18.46
1962	Janeat	3	7-11	Brian Henry	Avril Vasey	25/1	1:15.58
1963	Egualita	3	8-00	Frankie Durr	Sam Hall	10/1 F	1:12.86
1964	Compensation	5	8-10	Peter Robinson	Ted Lambton	10/1	1:17.84
1965	Kamundu	3	8-01	George Cadwaladr	Eric Cousins	100/8	1:14.88
1966	Milesius	4	7-12	Norman McIntosh	George Boyd	25/1	1:15.71
1967	Be Friendly	3	8-09	Geoff Lewis	Cyril Mitchell	100/8	1:12.36
1968	Petite Path	4	7-06	John Higgins	Ron Mason	100/7	1:12.83
1969	Brief Star	3	7-00	Cliff Parkes	Eric Cousins	10/1	1:11.46
1970	John Splendid	3	8-10	Ron Hutchinson	John Dunlop	10/1	1:17.51
1971	Royben	3	8-07	Bill Williamson	Scobie Breasley	9/1	1:12.70
1972	Swinging Junior	3	8-11	Richard Hutchinson	Nigel Angus	14/1	1:12.85
1973	Blue Cashmere	3	8-02	Ernie Johnson	Michael Stoute	7/1	1:12.83
1974	Somersway	4	7-12	Des Cullen	Bill Wightman	16/1	1:15.29
1975	Roman Warrior	4	10-00	Johnny Seagrave	Nigel Angus	8/1	1:12.40
1976	Last Tango	5	7-05	Lindsay Charnock	John Sutcliffe	6/1	1:10.85
1977	Jon George	3	8-04	Bruce Raymond	Mick Easterby	22/1	1:10.95
1978	Vaigly Great	3	9-06	Greville Starkey	Michael Stoute	5/1 F	1:17.17
1979	Primula Boy	4	7-07	Willie Higgins	Walter Bentley	40/1	1:15.13
1980	Sparkling Boy	3	9-02	John Lowe	Paul Kelleway	15/1	1:15.69
1981	First Movement	3	7-10	Mick Miller	Geoff Huffer	14/1	1:13.97
1982	Famous Star	3	7-07	Paul Eddery	Michael Albina	13/2	1:13.42
1983	Polly's Brother	5	8-03	Kevin Hodgson	Peter Easterby	11/1	1:14.45
1984	Able Albert	4	8-06	Mark Birch	Peter Easterby	9/1	1:15.13
1985	Camps Heath	4	7-09	Wendyll Woods	Frankie Durr	14/1	1:18.20
1986	Green Ruby	5	8-11	John Williams	Toby Balding	25/1	1:10.60
1987	Not So Silly	3	7-10	Gary Bardwell	Alan Bailey	12/1	1:15.29
1988	So Careful	5	7-07	Nicky Carlisle	Jack Berry	33/1	1:14.54
1989	Joveworth	6	8-00	Jimmy Fortune	Mike O'Neill	50/1	1:14.92
1990	Final Shot	3	8-02	John Lowe	Peter Easterby	12/1	1:13.80
1991	Sarcita	3	8-10	Brett Doyle	David Elsworth	14/1	1:09.36
1992	Lochsong	4	9-00	Francis Arrowsmith	Ian Balding	10/1	1:15.51
1993	Hard to Figure	7	9-06	Ray Cochrane	Ron Hodges	12/1	1:09.05
1994	Daring Destiny	3	8-00	Jason Tate	Karl Burke	18/1	1:14.61
1995	Royale Figurine	4	8-09	Darryll Holland	M. Fetherston-Godley	8/1	1:11.11
1996	Coastal Bluff	4	9-10	Jimmy Fortune	David Barron	3/1 F	1:09.54
1997	Wildwood Flower	4	9-03	Dane O'Neill	Richard Hannon Sr.	14/1	1:11.64
1998	Always Alight	4	8-07	John Egan	Karl Burke	16/1	1:16.12
1999	Grangeville	4	9-00	Kieren Fallon	Ian Balding	11/1	1:11.16
2000	Bahamian Pirate	5	8-00	Adrian Nicholls	David Nicholls	33/1	1:13.47
2001	Continent	4	8-10	Darryll Holland	David Nicholls	10/1	1:09.70
2002	Funfair Wane	3	9-03	Adrian Nicholls	David Nicholls	16/1	1:11.76
2003	Quito	6	8-06	Tony Culhane	David Chapman	20/1	1:09.90
2004	Funfair Wane	5	8-06	Paul Doe	David Nicholls	33/1	1:16.15
2005	Presto Shinko	4	9-02	Seb Sanders	Richard Hannon Sr.	12/1	1:12.45
2006	Fonthill Road	6	9-02	Paul Hanagan	Richard Fahey	16/1	1:12.70
2007	Advanced	4	9-09	Jamie Spencer	Kevin Ryan	20/1	1:12.91
2008	Regal Parade	4	8-10	William Carson, Jr.	David Nicholls	18/1	1:15.48
2009	Jimmy Styles	5	9-02	Frankie Dettori	Clive Cox	14/1	1:11.35
2010	Redford	5	9-02	Frankie Dettori	David Nicholls	14/1	1:10.26
2011	Our Jonathan	4	9-06	Franny Norton	Kevin Ryan	11/1	1:15.35
2012	Captain Ramius	6	9-00	Pat Smullen	Kevin Ryan	16/1	1:14.13
2013	Highland Colori	5	8-13	Oisin Murphy	Andrew Balding	20/1	1:12.65
2014	Louis the Pious	6	9-04	James Doyle	David O'Meara	10/1	1:09.53
2015	Don't Touch	3	9-01	Tony Hamilton	Richard Fahey	6/1 F	1:10.93
2016	Brando	4	9-10	Tom Eaves	Kevin Ryan	11/1	1:13.12
2017 (Note: The 2017 running was abandoned due to a waterlogged course - a replacement race was run at Haydock.)	Donjuan Triumphant	4	9-10	P. J. McDonald	Andrew Balding	13/2	1:17.10
2018 (dh)	Baron Bolt; Son of Rest	5; 4	8-12; 9-03	Cameron Noble; Chris Hayes	Paul Cole; Fozzy Stack	28/1; 5/1 F	1:14.77
2019	Angel Alexander	3	8-13	Richard Kingscote	Tom Dascombe	28/1	1.09.26
2020	Nahaarr	4	9-05	Tom Marquand	William Haggas	7/2 F	1:11.65
2021	Bielsa	6	9-01	Kevin Stott	Kevin Ryan	15/2	1:10.03
2022	Summerghand	8	9-05	Daniel Tudhope	David O'Meara	12/1	1:10.82
2023	Significantly	5	9-02	Joe Fanning	Julie Camacho	8/1 JF	1:10.77
2024	Lethal Levi	5	9-07	Clifford Lee	Karl Burke	20/1	1:07.55
2025	Run Boy Run	4	9-02	George Wood	Richard Spencer	12/1	1:12.52
2026	Pellitory	4	9-00	Danny Tudhope	David O'Meara	12/1	1:16.00

== Earlier winners ==
- 1804: Chancellor
- 1805: Chancellor
- 1806: Young Newbyth
- 1807: Juno
- 1808: Young Daffodil
- 1809: Bit of Tartan
- 1810: colt by John Bull
- 1811: Ayrshire Lass
- 1812: Ardrossan
- 1813: Snodgrass
- 1814: Ardrossan
- 1815: Marquis
- 1816: Kate Kearney
- 1817: Glengary
- 1818: Sans Culottes
- 1819: Monreith
- 1820: Chance
- 1821: colt by Stamford
- 1822: colt by Viscount
- 1823: Lancer
- 1824: Stratherne
- 1825: Lancer
- 1826: Robin Hood
- 1827: Dominie Skelp
- 1828: Mary
- 1829: Spadassin
- 1830: Brunswick
- 1831: Gondolier
- 1832: Vyvyan
- 1833: Philip
- 1834: Masetto
- 1835: Inheritor
- 1836: Despot
- 1837: Despot
- 1838: Inheritor
- 1839: Lanercost
- 1840: The Doctor
- 1841: Doctor Caius
- 1842: The Recorder
- 1843: The Shadow
- 1844: The Shadow
- 1845: Inheritress
- 1846: Inheritress
- 1847: Eryx
- 1848: Chanticleer
- 1849: Glen Saddel
- 1850: Elthiron
- 1851: Elthiron
- 1852: Stilton
- 1853: Testator
- 1854: Itch
- 1855: John Dory
- 1856: The Assayer
- 1857: Gathercole
- 1858: Trip the Daisy
- 1859: Susannah
- 1860: Greta
- 1861: Bloomsbury
- 1862: Little Captain
- 1863: Bohemian
- 1864: Newchurch
- 1865: Nothing More
- 1866: Fitzroy
- 1867: Miss Havelock
- 1868: Tabouret
- 1869: Good Hope
- 1870: Lady of Lyons
- 1871: Irregularity
- 1872: Alaric
- 1873: Lord Derby
- 1874: Servia
- 1875: Munden
- 1876: Coltness
- 1877: Ivy
- 1878: Sutler
- 1879: Umbria
- 1880: Strathblane
- 1881: Heath Bird
- 1882: Tita
- 1883: Tibicen
- 1884: Perdita
- 1885: Daylight
- 1886: Daylight
- 1887: Mirth
- 1888: Reverie
- 1889: Dazzle
- 1890: Dazzle
- 1891: Dazzle
- 1892: Horton
- 1893: Once More
- 1894: Mimram
- 1895: Linton
- 1896: Athel
- 1897: Athel
- 1898: Gyp
- 1899: Portebella
- 1900: Child Waters
- 1901: Caedmon
- 1902: Lovetin
- 1903: Kirkbride
- 1904: King's Birthday
- 1905: Kilglass
- 1906: Cyrus
- 1907: Charis

== See also ==
- Horse racing in Great Britain
- List of British flat horse races
