= Stewards' Cup (Great Britain) =

Flat horse race in Britain

- Class: Handicap
- Location: Goodwood Racecourse; W. Sussex, England
- Inaugurated: 1840
- Race type: Flat / Thoroughbred
- Sponsor: Coral
- Website: Goodwood

Race information
- Distance: 6f (1,207 metres)
- Surface: Turf
- Track: Straight
- Qualification: Three-years-old and up
- Weight: Handicap
- Purse: £250,000 (2025); 1st: £128,850

Stewards' Cup
2026
Evening Saigon	Stratusnine	Mitbaahy

Previous years
2024
Get It	Apollo One	Billyjoh
2023
Aberama Gold	Apollo One	Bielsa
2022
Commanche Falls	Tabdeed	Regional
2021
Commanche Falls	Gulliver	Great Ambassador

2020-2011
2020
Summerghand	Kimifive	Brian The Snail
2019
Khaadem	Open Wide	Raucous
2018
Gifted Master	Justanotherbottle	Growl
2017
Lancelot Du Lac	Aeolus	Upstaging
2016
Dancing Star	Orion's Bow	Raucous
2015
Magical Memory	Toofi	Rivellino
2014
Intrinsic	Ninjago	Alben Star
2013
Rex Imperator	Ajjaadd	Burwaaz
2012
Hawkeyethenoo	Imperial Guest	Lui Rei
2011
Hoof It	Tax Free	Mac's Power

2010-2001
2010
Evens And Odds	Jonny Mudball	Prohibit
2009
Genki	Evens And Odds	Knot In Wood
2008
Conquest	King's Apostle	Borderlescott
2007
Zidane	Borderlescott	Knot In Wood
2006
Borderlescott	Mutamared	Firenze
2005
Gift Horse	Fonthill Road	Fantasy Believer
2004
Pivotal Point	Fantasy Believer	High Reach
2003
Patavellian	Fire Up The Band	Colonel Cotton
2002
Bond Boy	Halmahera	Undeterred
2001
Guinea Hunter	Halmahera	Undeterred

2000-1991
2000
Tayseer	Bon Ami	Cubism
1999
Harmonic Way	Halmahera	Literary Society
1998
Superior Premium	Ansellman	Eastern Purple
1997
Danetime	My Best Valentine	Dashing Blue
1996
Coastal Bluff	Double Bounce	Sir Joey
1995
Shikari's Son	Top Banana	Jayannpee
1994
For The Present	Poker Chip	Humbert's Landing
1993
King's Signet	Hard To Figure	How's Yer Father
1992
Lochsong	Duplicity	Consigliere
1991
Notley	Macrobian	Masnun

1990-1988
1990
Knight Of Mercy	Bocas Rose	Amigo Menor
1989
Very Adjacent	Plain Fact	Rotherfield Greys
1988
Rotherfield Greys	Glencroft	Dowsing

The Stewards' Cup is a flat handicap horse race in Great Britain open to horses aged three years or older. It is run at Goodwood over a distance of 6 furlongs (1,207 metres), and it is scheduled to take place each year in late July or early August.

== History ==
For several years in the 1830s the senior steward at Goodwood presented an annual cup to the winner of any race of his choosing. The choice varied each year, and the trophy was awarded for events with distances of up to 1½ miles. A perpetual race for the Stewards' Cup over a sprint distance of 6 furlongs was conceived by Lord George Bentinck in late 1839, and the inaugural running took place the following summer.

The first commercial sponsor of the Stewards' Cup was Spillers, a company associated with the race from 1970 to 1980. The event was backed by the Tote in 1981, and by William Hill from 1982 to 1992.

The race was formerly held on the opening day of the five-day Glorious Goodwood meeting. It was moved to the final day in 1993, and from this point it was sponsored by Vodafone. The sponsorship was taken over by Blue Square in 2007, and in 2013 the race was sponsored by Robins Farm Racing. In 2014 Goodwood announced that 32Red would take over the sponsorship and the race would lose its historic title, being run as the 32Red Cup. The 2015 running was sponsored by Qatar and the name reverted to the Stewards' Cup.

== Records ==
Most successful horse (2 wins):

- Marvel – 1890, 1892
- Golden Rod – 1910, 1912
- Lord Annandale – 1913, 1914 (dead-heat)
- Sugar Palm – 1942, 1943
- Sky Diver – 1967, 1968
- Commanche Falls - 2021, 2022

Leading jockey (4 wins):

- Richard Hughes – Shikari's Son (1995), Harmonic Way (1999), Tayseer (2000), Intrinsic (2014)

Leading trainer (4 wins):

- John Scott – Epirus (1840), Psalmsinger (1845), Longbow (1853), Sweetsauce (1860)
- James Jewitt – Sweetbread (1884), Crafton (1886), Amphora (1897), Altesse (1898)

== Winners since 1900 ==
- Weights given in stones and pounds.

Year	Winner	Age	Weight	Jockey	Trainer	SP	Time
1900	Royal Flush	7	7-13	Johnny Reiff	H Steel	11/2 F	1:13.60
1901	O'Donovan Rossa	4	7-00	George Gibson	Davies	66/1	1:14.40
1902	Mauvezin	6	8-02	Harry Lewis	Greusel	10/1	1:15.00
1903	Dumbarton Castle	3		John Powney
1904	Melayr	3	6-09	William Griggs	Jack Robinson	40/1
1905	Xeny	4	7-09	Frank Bullock	John Brewer	25/1	1:14.20
1906	Rocketter	3	7-06	Billy Higgs	Sam Darling	5/1 F	1:16.00
1907	Romney	3	6-03	Harry Watts	Chandler	10/1
1908	Elmstead	3	7-00	Joseph Plant	Charles Morton	20/1	1:13.80
1909	Mediant	3	7-13	Frank O'Neill	Andrew Joyner	10/1
1910	Golden Rod	4	8-01	Herbert Randall	Atty Persse	20/1	1:15.60
1911	Braxted	3	7-05	Fred Winter Sr.	Felix Leach	25/1	1:12.40
1912	Golden Rod	6	8-13	Danny Maher	Samuel Pickering	9/1	1:14.80
1913	Lord Annandale	3	6-10	Richard Cooper	Dawson Waugh	25/1	1:12.80
1914 (dh)	Golden Sun; Lord Annandale	4; 4	8-12; 7-09	William Huxley; Steve Donoghue	Charles Morton; Dawson Waugh	10/1; 100/9	1:13.80
1915 (Note: The race took place at Newmarket from 1915 to 1917)	Clap Gate	4	6-11	Percy Allden	Geoffrey Barling	10/1
1916	All Serene	3	6-07	Joe Hulse	Captain Robert Dewhurst	20/1
1917	Trojan	3	6-13	George Hulme	J Dawson	8/1
1918	no race
1919	King Sol	5	7-00	William Balding	James Batho	100/7	1:12.80
1920	Western Wave	4	8-07	Albert Whalley	Harry Cottrill	100/8	1:15.20
1921	Service Kit	4	6-12	Tommy Weston	Vanda Beatty	20/1	1:13.60
1922	Tetrameter	5	7-07	George Smith	Atty Persse	10/1 CF	1:13.40
1923	Épinard	3	8-06	Everett Haynes	Hiram Eugene Leigh	7/2 F	1:12.60
1924	Compiler	4	7-09	William Lister	Charles Nugent	9/1 JF	1:14.00
1925	Defiance	4	7-08	Richard Perryman	Samuel Pickering	20/1	1:15.60
1926	Perhaps So	5	8-01	William McLachlan	Cecil Boyd-Rochfort	100/6	1:14.00
1927	Priory Park	5	9-00	Bernard Carslake	Charles Peck	10/1	1:13.00
1928	Navigator	3	7-05	Gordon Richards	Tommy Hogg	8/1	1:12.80
1929	Fleeting Memory	4	8-01	Richard Perryman	Walter Earl	100/8	1:13.40
1930	Le Phare	4	8-01	Michael Beary	Richard Dawson	100/6	1:13.40
1931	Poor Lad	4	7-11	Sam Wragg	Ossie Bell	9/1	1:16.60
1932	Solenoid	3	7-10	Tommy Barber	George Poole	33/1	1:18.60
1933	Pharacre	4	7-05	Freddie Fox	Fred Butters	22/1	1:12.20
1934	Figaro	4	8-05	Tommy Weston	Jack Leach	100/7	1:13.80
1935	Greenore	6	8-08	Sam Wragg	Ossie Bell	7/1	1:12.20
1936	Solerina	4	8-11	Eph Smith	Harry Cottrill	10/1	1:14.00
1937	Firozepore	3	8-03	Gordon Richards	Fred Darling	100/8 CF	1:13.00
1938	Harmachis	5	7-06	Percy Evans	Bertie Bullock	100/7	1:12.40
1939	Knight's Caprice	4	8-06	Joe Canty	Richard Dawson	100/8	1:14.00
1940	no race
1941 (Note: The 1941 running took place at Newmarket)	Valthema	4	7-02	Kenneth Robertson	Fred Butters	100/8	1:12.20
1942 (Note: The race took place at Windsor from 1942 to 1945)	Sugar Palm	4	9-07	Tommy Carey	Frank Hartigan	7/2 F	1:13.00
1943	Sugar Palm	5	9-07	Tommy Carey	Frank Hartigan	6/5 F	1:11.80
1944	British Colombo	5	7-05	Tommy Bartlam	Steve Donoghue	100/7	1:12.80
1945	Happy Grace	3	7-04	Tommy Gosling	Henri Jelliss	5/1	1:11.60
1946	Commissar	6	7-12	Albert Richardson	Alfred Stedall	10/1	1:13.40
1947	Closeburn	3	8-10	Gordon Richards	Noel Murless	100/7	1:13.60
1948	Dramatic	3	7-07	Eph Smith	George Todd	9/1	1:12.00
1949	The Bite	4	7-07	Herbert Packham	Jim Wood	33/1	1:12.20
1950	First Consul	4	8-13	Edgar Britt	Sam Armstrong	100/9	1:13.40
1951	Sugar Bowl	4	7-12	Willie Snaith	Sam Armstrong	100/6	1:13.20
1952	Smokey Eyes	5	8-10	Charlie Smirke	Ryan Jarvis	100/7	1:12.20
1953	Palpitate	4	7-13	Willie Snaith	Sam Armstrong	5/1 F	1:13.20
1954	Ashurst Wonder	4	6-11	Tony Shrive	Les Hall	50/1	1:16.40
1955	King Bruce	4	8-11	Bill Rickaby	Peter Hastings-Bass	100/6	1:11.40
1956	Matador	3	9-02	Eph Smith	John Waugh	100/8	1:13.80
1957	Arcandy	4	8-09	Tommy Gosling	George Beeby	100/7	1:11.80
1958	Epaulette	7	9-00	Frankie Durr	William O'Gorman	33/1	1:15.00
1959	Tudor Monarch	4	7-13	Geoff Lewis	Walter Nightingall	25/1	1:13.00
1960	Monet	3	8-05	Jimmy Lindley	Jeremy Tree	20/1	1:12.00
1961	Skymaster	3	8-12	Scobie Breasley	Gordon Smyth	100/7	1:12.00
1962	Victorina	3	8-09	Bill Williamson	Peter Nelson	10/1 F	1:11.40
1963	Creole	4	9-01	Stan Smith	Jack Jarvis	20/1	1:09.00
1964	Dunme	5	7-12	Paul Cook	R Read	9/1 F	1:13.00
1965	Potier	3	8-05	Ron Hutchinson	Jack Jarvis	100/7	1:14.80
1966	Patient Constable	3	7-07	Ray Reader	Ron Smyth	33/1	1:13.80
1967	Sky Diver	4	7-05	Des Cullen	Peter Payne-Gallwey	20/1	1:11.80
1968	Sky Diver	5	7-06	Terry Sturrock	Peter Payne-Gallwey	100/6	1:10.00
1969	Royal Smoke	3	7-09	Taffy Thomas	Bill O'Gorman	100/7	1:12.80
1970	Jukebox	4	8-11	Lester Piggott	Harold Wallington	100/6	1:13.30
1971	Apollo Nine	4	9-05	Jimmy Lindley	Peter Nelson	14/1	1:13.52
1972	Touch Paper	3	8-02	Paul Cook	Bruce Hobbs	25/1	1:11.71
1973	Alphadamus	3	7-11	Paul Cook	Michael Stoute	16/1	1:11.47
1974	Red Alert	3	9-02	Johnny Roe	Dermot Weld	16/1	1:11.98
1975	Import	4	8-00	Taffy Thomas	Bill Wightman	14/1	1:11.19
1976	Jimmy The Singer	3	7-08	Ernie Johnson	Brian Lunness	15/1	1:12.24
1977	Calibina	5	8-05	Geoff Baxter	Paul Cole	8/1 F	1:13.21
1978	Ahonoora	3	8-00	Philip Waldron	Brian Swift	50/1	1:10.85
1979	Standaan	3	7-10	Paul Bradwell	Clive Brittain	5/1 F	1:13.37
1980	Repetitious	3	7-02	Tony Clark	Guy Harwood	15/1	1:12.36
1981	Crews Hill	5	9-09	Greville Starkey	Frankie Durr	11/1	1:11.61
1982	Soba	3	8-04	David Nicholls	David Chapman	18/1	1:09.58
1983	Autumn Sunset	3	8-02	Willie Carson	Michael Stoute	6/1 F	1:10.30
1984	Petong	4	9-10	Bruce Raymond	Michael Jarvis	8/1 JF	1:12.68
1985	Al Trui	5	8-01	Michael Wigham	Stan Mellor	9/1 F	1:13.65
1986	Green Ruby	5	8-12	John Williams	Toby Balding	20/1	1:12.80
1987	Madraco	4	7-02	Peter Hill	Peter Calver	50/1	1:10.24
1988	Rotherfield Greys	6	8-08	Nigel Day	Chris Wall	14/1	1:12.84
1989	Very Adjacent	4	7-04	Dale Gibson	Geoff Lewis	12/1	1:10.60
1990	Knight of Mercy	4	9-00	Bruce Raymond	Richard Hannon Sr.	14/1	1:10.73
1991	Notley	4	8-07	Richard Perham	Richard Hannon Sr.	14/1	1:11.62
1992	Lochsong	4	8-00	Willie Carson	Ian Balding	10/1	1:10.86
1993	King's Signet	4	9-10	Willie Carson	John Gosden	16/1	1:15.00
1994	For the Present	4	8-03	Jimmy Fortune	David Barron	16/1	1:09.58
1995	Shikari's Son	8	8-13	Richard Hughes	John White	40/1	1:10.86
1996	Coastal Bluff	4	8-05	Jimmy Fortune	David Barron	10/1 JF	1:10.14
1997	Danetime	3	8-10	Pat Eddery	Neville Callaghan	5/1 F	1:10.95
1998	Superior Premium	4	8-12	Robert Winston	Richard Fahey	14/1	1:10.65
1999	Harmonic Way	4	8-06	Richard Hughes	Roger Charlton	12/1	1:10.30
2000	Tayseer	6	8-11	Richard Hughes	David Nicholls	13/2	1:10.08
2001	Guinea Hunter	5	9-00	Jamie Spencer	Tim Easterby	33/1	1:11.49
2002	Bond Boy	5	8-02	Chris Catlin	Bryan Smart	14/1	1:10.87
2003	Patavellian	5	8-11	Steve Drowne	Roger Charlton	4/1	1:10.43
2004	Pivotal Point	4	8-11	Seb Sanders	Peter Makin	7/1 CF	1:10.78
2005	Gift Horse	5	9-07	Kieren Fallon	David Nicholls	9/2	1:12.26
2006	Borderlescott	4	9-05	Royston Ffrench	Robin Bastiman	10/1	1:09.93
2007	Zidane	5	9-01	Jamie Spencer	James Fanshawe	6/1 F	1:10.50
2008	Conquest	4	8-09	Dane O'Neill	William Haggas	40/1	1:11.91
2009	Genki	5	9-01	Steve Drowne	Roger Charlton	14/1	1:12.28
2010	Evens and Odds	6	8-10	Billy Cray	David Nicholls	20/1	1:11.55
2011	Hoof It	4	10-00	Kieren Fallon	Mick Easterby	13/2 JF	1:09.91
2012	Hawkeyethenoo	6	9-09	Graham Lee	Jim Goldie	9/1	1:11.27
2013	Rex Imperator	4	9-04	Neil Callan	William Haggas	12/1	1:10.35
2014	Intrinsic	4	8-11	Richard Hughes	Robert Cowell	6/1	1:10.27
2015	Magical Memory	3	8-12	Frankie Dettori	Charles Hills	6/1 F	1:10.28
2016	Dancing Star	3	8-12	David Probert	Andrew Balding	9/2 F	1:09.81
2017	Lancelot Du Lac	7	9-05	Frankie Dettori	Dean Ivory	25/1	1:12.28
2018	Gifted Master	5	9-06	Jason Watson	Hugo Palmer	20/1	1:09.56
2019	Khaadem	3	9-06	Jim Crowley	Charles Hills	4/1 F	1:09.79
2020	Summerghand	6	9-10	Daniel Tudhope	David O’Meara	22/1	1:10.83
2021	Commanche Falls	4	9-01	Connor Beasley	Michael Dods	10/1	1:15.86
2022	Commanche Falls	5	9-05	Connor Beasley	Michael Dods	25/1	1:10.01
2023	Aberama Gold	6	8-13	Andrea Atzeni	David O'Meara	18/1	1:16.93
2024	Get It	6	9-05	Pat Cosgrave	George Baker	40/1	1:10.17
2025	Two Tribes	4	9-00	David Egan	Richard Spencer	11/2	1:10.14
2026	Evening Saigon	4	9-00	James Doyle	Hamad Al Jehani	16/1	1:09.55

== Earlier winners ==
- 1840: Epirus
- 1841: Garry Owen
- 1842: Lady Adela
- 1843: Yorkshire Lady
- 1844: Sir Abstrupus
- 1845: Psalmsinger
- 1846: Lady Wildair
- 1847: The Cur
- 1848: The Admiral
- 1849: Cotton Lord
- 1850: Turnus
- 1851: Loadstone
- 1852: Kilmeny
- 1853: Longbow
- 1854: Pumicestone
- 1855: Clotilde
- 1856: New Brighton
- 1857: Tournament
- 1858: Glenmasson
- 1859: Maid of Kent
- 1860: Sweetsauce
- 1861: Croagh Patrick
- 1862: Lady Clifden
- 1863: Birdhill
- 1864: Marigold
- 1865: Out and Outer
- 1866: Sultan
- 1867: Tibthorpe
- 1868: Vex
- 1869: Fichu
- 1870: Typhoeus
- 1871: Anton
- 1872: Oxonian
- 1873: Sister Helen
- 1874: Modena
- 1875: Trappist
- 1876: Monaco
- 1877: Herald
- 1878: Midlothian
- 1879: Peter
- 1880: Elf King
- 1881: Mazurka
- 1882: Lowland Chief
- 1883: Hornpipe
- 1884: Sweetbread
- 1885: Dalmeny
- 1886: Crafton
- 1887: Upset
- 1888: Tib
- 1889: Dog Rose
- 1890: Marvel
- 1891: Unicorne
- 1892: Marvel
- 1893: Medora
- 1894: Gangway
- 1895: Wise Virgin
- 1896: Chasseur
- 1897: Amphora
- 1898: Altesse
- 1899: Northern Farmer

== See also ==
- Horse racing in Great Britain
- List of British flat horse races
