= Alex Greaves =

British jockey (born 1968)

Personal information
- Born: 12 April 1968 (age 58) Northallerton, England
- Occupations: Jockey, trainer
- Height: 5 ft 1 in (155 cm)
- Weight: 8 st 4 lb (116 lb; 53 kg)
- Spouse: David 'Dandy' Nicholls (m. 1994)
- Children: 3

Horse racing career
- Sport: Horse racing
- Career wins: 287

Major racing wins
- Major races Nunthorpe Stakes (1997 (dh))

Racing awards
- Ladies Professional Championship Trophy (1990, 1991)

Significant horses
- Ya Malak

Alex Greaves (born 12 April 1968) is a British former professional flat jockey. In 1996 she was the first woman to ride in the Epsom Dash in Epsom Derby's 216-year history on filly Portuguese Lil. She was the first woman to ride in the 1000 Guineas Stakes also on Portuguese Lil and in 1997 became the first woman to ride a Group 1 winner at the Nunthorpe Stakes on Ya Malak. She won the Female Jockey of the Year five times.

== Personal life ==
Alex Ann Greaves was born in 1968. Her mother, Valerie Greaves, was the first woman to "ride in a race under rules", and the first professional woman to beat professional jockeys over jumps. Her father, Ernest Greaves, was a farmer and a British Show Pony Society judge. Her uncle, David Greaves, was a professional rider, winning the Mackeson (now Paddy Power) Gold Cup in 1975.

Greaves started riding aged four. She subsequently joined the Pony Club and moved through the gymkhana circuit, showjumping and hunter trials. She began to ride out on the gallops when she was 13. Before her racing career, Greaves was working in hotel management, after earning a diploma in hotel and management studies from Leeds Polytechnic.

In 1991 she was engaged to fellow jockey apprentice, Gary Hind, but married trainer, David 'Dandy' Nicholls (1956-2017) in April 1994, at Northallerton. They had three children.

== Career ==
=== Apprenticeship with David Barron ===
In 1989 Greaves joined David Barron's stables in Maunby, Thirsk, Yorkshire as an apprentice, where her mother was Barron's 'head lad'. In 1989 she set "some kind of record" by being the first apprentice to have her "claim reduced from 7lb to 5lb without riding a winner on turf". Greaves turned professional in 1989. Her first win was on Andrew's First at Southwell Racecourse's all-weather Fibresand track, on 1 December 1989. After Greaves' performance, Barron was quoted in the Sports Argus, saying, "She is by far the best apprentice I've ever had. She's cool and confident and nothing seems to bother her." In her first year she rode 41 winners, including 17 on the turf, which earned her the 1990 Ladies Professional Championship Trophy. Her statistics in her first year – 16 wins from 28 races – gave her a 57% win rate, higher than Lester Piggott or Willie Shoemaker at the same point in their racing careers. In February 1990, Greaves said, "As soon as I took up all-weather racing, everything changed. I loved it from day one and have enjoyed an unbelievably lucky run." In 1990 she became the first female flat jockey to ride out her claim. In April 1992 Greaves appeared on the BBC's A Question of Sport. She and Barron "parted company" in May 1993. No official reason was given, but it coincided with Greaves' engagement to former jockey, David "Dandy" Nicholls, who she had met at Barron's stables.

=== Riding for David Nicholls ===
After retiring from racing, Nicholls became a trainer, and Greaves raced for him. In 1995, on discussing the challenges of being a female jockey, Greaves said, "If a male jockey rode the winners that I did as an apprentice, he would be almost guaranteed a future as a jockey. But a girl is not – many owners and trainers consider us weaker." In 1996 Greaves was the first woman to ride in the Epsom Derby, on filly Portuguese Lil, with odds of 500-1. Of her chances in the race, she said, "It's not as if there's going to be any pressure on me as the horse does not have a great chance." Portuguese Lil came in last. In 1997, she became the first woman to ride a Group One winner, Ya Malak, in a photo-finish at the Nunthorpe Stakes. In an interview with the Sunday Times, Greaves said "We [female jockeys] are regarded as novelties... And there is an awful lot of hypocrisy, too. Trainers will come up and tell you you rode a brilliant race, but they'd never dream of putting you on their horses."

=== Overseas ===
Greaves rode in southern Africa, including at the 1992 British Airways Concorde Cup to mark Harare track's centenary, where she won on Ace of Aces. She also raced in Japan, Hong Kong, France, Ireland, Dubai and Barbados.

== Select highlights ==
- 1990: Double win on Bronze Cross and Give In at Southwell
- 1990: 50th win of her career on Andrew's First at Southwell
- 1990: Treble win on Irish Passage, Orchard Court and Bronze Cross at Southwell
- 1991: Lincoln Handicap on Amenable at Doncaster Racecourse
- 1991: Double win on Rhythmic Style and Selling Stakes at Doncaster
- 1991: Double win on Super One and Gods Solution at Catterick Racecourse
- 1992: Treble win on Thunderbird One, East Barns, Allinson's Mate at Southwell
- 1992: Become the first woman professional to win in southern Africa on There's Magic at Bulawayo, Zimbabwe
- 1993: selected to take part in a series of women's races as part of National Association of Racing of Japan
- 1997: Became the "first woman in Europe" to win a Group One race in the Nunthorpe Stakes on Ya Malak.

Greaves partnered Zuhair in three of four successive wins at Goodwood's Charlton Stakes.

== Awards and honours ==
- 1990: Ladies Professional Championship Trophy
- 1990: Lanson Lady of the Month (January)
- 1990: Aberlour Outstanding Achievement Award from the Federation of British Racing Clubs
- 1991: William Hill Golden Spurs Award Outstanding Apprentice for 1990 – the first woman to appear in the awards in its 19-year history
- 1991: voted Lady Jockey of the Year at the inaugural awards of the Jockeys Association
- 1991: Ladies Professional Championship Trophy
- 1996: voted Lady Jockey of the Year
- 1998: voted Lady Jockey of the Year
- 2016: Greaves was one of the three Investec Derby Ambassadors, together with Frankie Dettori and Hayley Turner
- 2022: Included in the newly opened Derby Hall of Fame at Epsom Market Place
- 2023: Featured in QIPCO British Champions Series Hall of Fame as part of International Women's Day

She also won a Likely Lad award

== Monikers ==
Of the various monikers ascribed to her, including "Queen of All-Weather Racing", "Queen of the Sands" and "Queen of Southwell", Greaves said, "I've never wanted to be considered a lady rider, or ever asked for any favours. I've always just been another jockey." In 1991, after winning the Lincoln Handicap, she hoped that "her performance to beat 24 male rivals should finally bury that condescending title "Queen of Southwell", but acknowledged that even after this victory some would still use "that silly nickname", adding "I don't know what I have to do to lose it."

== Retirement ==
Greaves retired from racing in 2005, after riding 287 winners. Of her retirement she said, "As a girl in this game you have to work twice as hard to prove yourself, and after 15 years of pushing hard I know it's the right choice." Greaves also struggled with her weight, saying "I rode nine lots of work the other day in a sweatsuit, then got on the treadmill, had a swim and lost only half a pound." After retiring, Greaves worked alongside Nicholls in their training establishment in Sessay, Thirsk. As of 2023 she continues to ride out every day at Tim Easterby's Great Habton stables.

== See also ==
- Greaves' Horse Racing Hall of Fame entry
