= David Nicholls (racehorse trainer) =

British jockey and racehorse trainer

David 'Dandy' Nicholls (20 April 1956–4 June 2017) was a British jockey and racehorse trainer who competed in flat racing. He was particularly noted for his success training horses who raced over five and six furlongs.

Nicholls was born in Pudsey, West Yorkshire in 1956, the son of a seaman, and left home at the age of fourteen. He spent his early racing career as an apprentice jockey in the stables of Deryck Bastiman at Wetherby, riding his first winner in 1973. He subsequently worked for Clifford Watts at Bridlington and then David Chapman. At Chapman's stables he formed a partnership with the filly Soba, on whom he won the Stewards' Cup in 1982. He was nicknamed "Dandy" after the actress Dandy Nichols.

Nicholls retired in 1993 after riding 421 winners and began a training career at stables at Sessay, sending out his first winner in December of the same year. He gained his nickname of “the Sprint King” with victories in several of the sport's major Group 1 races and repeat victories in top handicap races including six wins in the Ayr Gold Cup, three in the Stewards' Cup and four in the Epsom Dash. He retired from training in March 2017, citing financial problems and ill-health, having been diagnosed with haemochromatosis. His final winner was Sovereign Debt in a Group 2 race in Doha in February 2017. He had trained the winners of 1,269 races.

== Personal life ==
Nicholls was married twice and had three children: Amy and Adrian from his first marriage and James from another relationship. His first marriage ended in divorce and he then married jockey Alex Greaves. Nicholl's son Adrian is a trainer and former jockey. Adrian's son Jack Nicholls and daughter Mia Nicholls are also jockeys.

In 2016, Nicholls was charged with sexual assault. He denied the charges and was due to stand trial in August 2017.

Nicholls died in June 2017, aged 61.

== Major wins as a trainer ==
Great Britain

- Haydock Sprint Cup - (1) - Regal Parade (2009)
- July Cup - (1) - Continent (2002)
- Nunthorpe Stakes - (2) - Ya Malak (1997), Bahamian Pirate (2004)

France

- Prix de l'Abbaye de Longchamp - (1) - Continent (2002)
- Prix Maurice de Gheest - (1) - Regal Parade (2010)
