= Robert Cowell =

English racehorse trainer

Personal information
- Born: 29 November 1968 (age 57)
- Occupation: Trainer

Horse racing career
- Sport: Horse racing
- Career wins: 358 (Four Group 1's)

Significant horses
- Jwala, Goldream, Kingsgate Native, Prohibit

Robert Cowell (born 29 November 1968) is an English racehorse trainer based in Newmarket, who is widely regarded as one of the best trainers of horses running over sprint distances. His group one winners include: Prohibit, winner of the King's Stand Stakes, Jwala winner of the Nunthorpe Stakes and Goldream winner of the King's Stand Stakes and Prix de l'Abbaye de Longchamp.

Cowell's father rode in Point-to-point races and bred racehorses including Untold. Cowell began his racing career working for Gavin Pritchard-Gordon. He also worked for John Hammond in France and Neil Drysdale in the United States before starting his own training career in 1996 at Hollywood Park Racetrack in California. In 1997 Cowell returned to Britain and began training at Newmarket and gained his first victory in January 1998 when Mary Cornwallis won at Lingfield Park. In recent years Cowell has become renowned for his ability to take handicappers like Prohibit from other trainers and improving them to gain Black Type success. As part of the research for her novel Mount!, Jilly Cooper consulted Cowell.

== Major wins ==
(United Kingdom) Great Britain

- King's Stand Stakes – (2) Prohibit (2011), Goldream (2015)
- Nunthorpe Stakes – (1) Jwala (2013)

France

- Prix de l'Abbaye de Longchamp – (1) Goldream (2015)
