= Prohibit (horse) =

British-bred Thoroughbred racehorse

- Sire: Oasis Dream
- Grandsire: Green Desert
- Dam: Well Warned
- Damsire: Warning
- Sex: Gelding
- Foaled: 14 February 2005
- Country: United Kingdom
- Colour: Bay
- Breeder: Juddmonte Farms
- Owner: Khalid Abdullah; Dasmal, Rix, Barr, Morley & Penney
- Trainer: John Gosden; Robert Cowell
- Record: 59: 9-5-8

Major wins
- Shergar Cup Dash (2010); Scarbrough Stakes (2010); Dubai Trophy Handicap (2011); King's Stand Stakes (2011); Prix du Petit Couvert (2011)

Prohibit (foaled 14 February 2005) is a retired British Thoroughbred racehorse who excelled over sprint distances, producing most of his best performances over five furlongs. In his first three seasons he was trained by John Gosden and showed useful form, winning three minor races but appearing to be some way short of top class. After being sold and transferred to the stable of Robert Cowell he showed improved form, winning the sprint race at the 2010 Shergar Cup and winning a strongly contested edition of the Scarbrough Stakes. He reached his peak as a six-year-old in 2011 when he won a handicap race in Dubai, the Group One King's Stand Stakes at Royal Ascot and the Prix du Petit Couvert in France as well as running prominently in several other major sprints including the Prix de Saint-Georges, Temple Stakes, Prix du Gros Chêne and Nunthorpe Stakes. He remained in training for three more seasons but never won again and was retired in 2014 with a record of nine wins from fifty-nine starts.

== Background ==
Prohibit is a bay horse with a white star and muzzle bred in England by his owner Khalid Abdullah's Juddmonte Farms. He was initially sent into training with John Gosden at Newmarket, Suffolk.

He was from the first crop of foals sired by Oasis Dream, a sprinter who won the July Cup and the Nunthorpe Stakes in 2003 before becoming a very successful breeding stallion. His other progeny have included Midday, Muhaarar Jwala and Power. Prohibit's dam Well Warned won one minor race at Haydock Park in 1996 from nine starts. She was a great-granddaughter of the influential British broodmare Mofida, the female-line ancestor of Zafonic, Reams of Verse and Elmaamul.

== Racing career ==
=== 2007–2009: early career ===
The racing colours of Khalid Abdullah, who bred Prohibit and owned him until October 2009

Prohibit began his racing career in September 2007 when he finished second over seven furlongs at Kempton Park Racecourse and sixth in a maiden race over the same distance at Lingfield Park. At Nottingham Racecourse on 3 October he started at odds of 7/2 in a fourteen-runner field and won by one and a quarter lengths from the Clive Brittain-trained Mansii.

Prohibit began his second season by carrying 125 pounds to victory in a handicap race over six furlongs at Newmarket Racecourse in April and then finished third in the Listed Pavilion Stakes at Ascot Racecourse two weeks later. In May he finished third when favourite for a handicap at Newmarket before running fifth in the Sandy Lane Stakes at Haydock and then finished unplaced in a handicap at York Racecourse in June. After a four-month break he returned for a race over six furlongs on the synthetic Polytrack surface at Chelmsford City Racecourse and won by three quarters of a length at odds of 12/1. He ended his season by finishing seventh in the Listed Golden Rose Stakes at Lingfield in November.

In 2009, Prohibit was entered in more prestigious sprint contests but failed to win a race. He finished sixth in the Abernant Stakes on his debut and then finished unplaced under 136 pounds in a valuable handicap at Newmarket. In the summer he finished fifth in the Wokingham Stakes at Royal Ascot and ran unplaced in the Stewards' Cup at Glorious Goodwood. On his final run of the year he was beaten a short head by Hitchens in a handicap at Haydock in September.

In October 2009 Prohibit was offered for sale at Tattersalls and was bought for 85,000 guineas by the racehorse trainer Robert Cowell. The gelding entered the ownership of a partnership including Khalifa Dasmal, Allen Rix, Frank Barr, Thomas Morley and Janet Penney and was trained for the rest of his racing career by Cowell at Six Mile Bottom near Newmarket.

=== 2010: five-year-old season ===
In early 2009 Prohibit was campaigned in Dubai where he finished unplaced in three starts at Meydan Racecourse. On his return to Europe he won a minor race over six furlongs at Kempton on 27 March, beating Elnawin by half a length at odds of 6/1. In May he ran unplaced in a handicap at Newmarket and was then sent to Sweden where he finished fourth in a Listed sprint race at Jägersro.

On returning to England he reverted to handicap company and finished unplaced in the Wokingham Stakes, second at Windsor, third and fourth in races at Ascot and third in the Stewards' Cup. On 7 August was selected to run in the Shergar Cup, an International jockeys' competition in which he represented the Europe team as the mount of Christophe Soumillon in the "Dash". Carrying top weight of 138 pounds he took the lead inside the final furlong and won "comfortably" by a length from Golden Destiny. Three weeks later he started favourite for the Listed Beverley Bullet but was beaten a short head by the Mick Channon-trained Master Hughie.

On 8 September Prohibit started at odds of 9/2 in the Listed Scarbrough Stakes over five furlonga at Doncaster Racecourse in which he was ridden by Jamie Spencer. The best of his eight opponents appeared to be Group Therapy (runner-up to Borderlescott in the King George Stakes), Rose Blossom (winner of the Summer Stakes), Look Busy (Temple Stakes) and Captain Dunne (Epsom Dash). After tracking the leaders he accelerated inside the final furlong and won by three quarters of a length from the front-running Rose Blossom with Group Therapy in third. Ten days later he was moved up to Group Three class for the World Trophy at Newbury Racecourse and finished third to Astrophysical Jet and Golden Destiny. On 3 October he was sent to France and stepped up to Group One level for the Prix de l'Abbaye over 1000 metres in which he was ridden by Frankie Dettori and finished sixth of the twenty-one runners behind the upset winner Gilt Edge Girl.

=== 2011: six-year-old season ===
==== Spring ====
As in 2011, Prohibit began his season in Dubai where he ran four times at Meydan in early spring. After finishing eighth in Group Three race on 3 February he contested a valuable handicap race a week later over five furlongs and won by a short head from the Irish-trained Invincible Ash. He ran fourth when favourite for a conditions races on 3 March and then finished fifth behind the South African sprinter J J the Jet Plane in the Al Quoz Sprint on Dubai World Cup Night.

On his return to Europe Prohibit was campaigned exclusively in Group races. He finished ninth to Tangerine Trees in a blanket finish to the Palace House Stakes on 30 April and then ran fourth to Inxile in a five-way photo-finish for the Prix de Saint-Georges at Longchamp on 15 May. Six days later he finished third to Sole Power and Kingsgate Native in the Temple Stakes at Haydock with Borderlescott, Group Therapy, Rose Blossom, Overdose, Tangerine Trees and Markab among the other beaten runners. At Chantilly Racecourse on 5 June he was again narrowly defeated in a strong field when he was beaten a head by the three-year-old filly Wizz Kid in the Prix du Gros Chêne with Inxile in third and the Prix de l'Abbaye winners Total Gallery and Marchand d'Or in sixth and seventh.

==== Summer ====
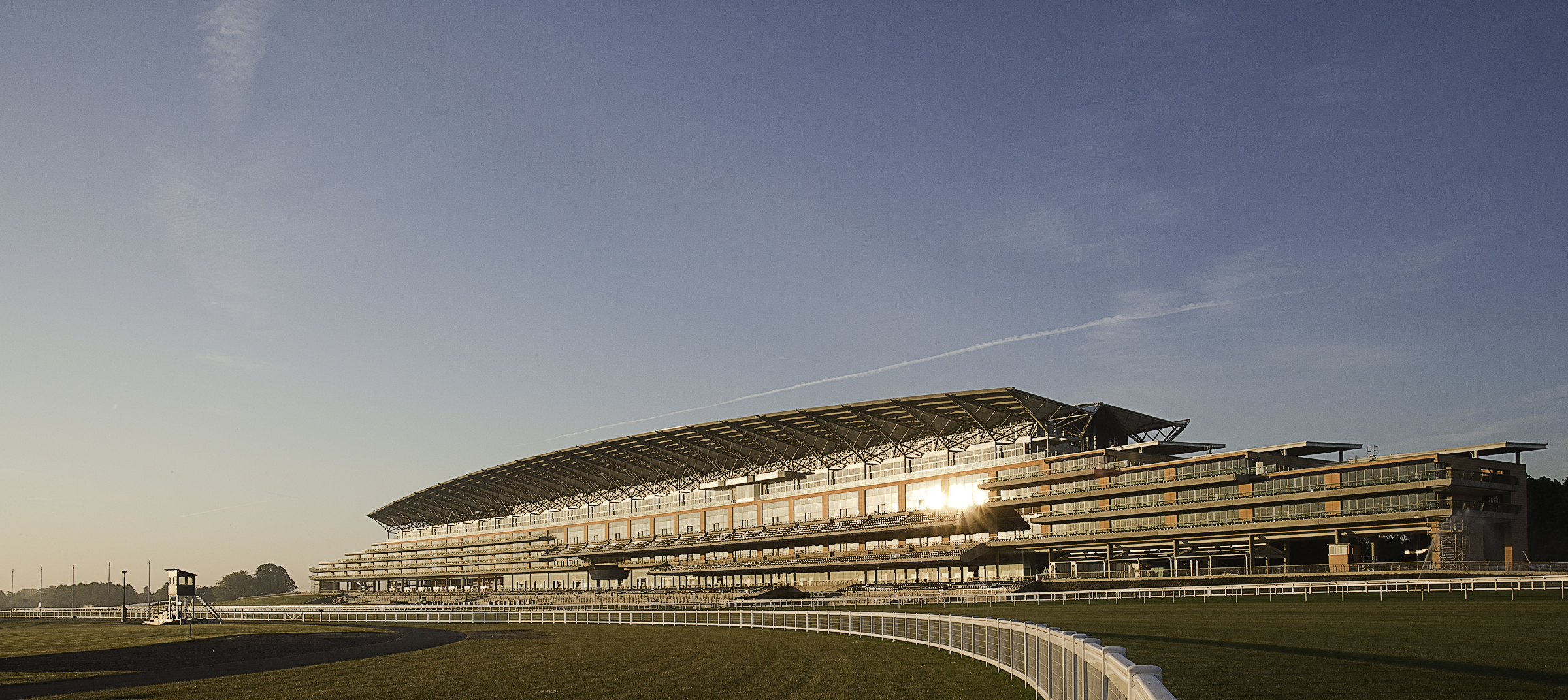
Ascot Racecourse: the site of Prohibit's win in the King's Stand Stakes

In the King's Stand Stakes at Royal Ascot on 14 June Prohibit was ridden by Jim Crowley and started the 7/1 fourth choice in the betting behind Kingsgate Native, the Australian challenger Star Witness (Blue Diamond Stakes) and Sole Power. The other fifteen runners included Bridgetown (Summer Stakes) and Holiday for Kitten from the United States, Sweet Sanette from Hong Kong, War Artist (Goldene Peitsche) from Germany, Mar Ardentro from France, Arctic (Round Tower Stakes) from Ireland and Overdose from Hungary as well as Tangerine Trees, Rose Blossom, Astrophysical Jet, Iver Bridge Lad (Dragon Stakes) and Monsieur Chevalier (Molecomb Stakes) from the United Kingdom. Prohibit was restrained behind the leaders as Rose Blossom set the pace but began to make progress two furlongs out, at which point Sweet Sanette went to the front. Prohibit maintained his run, overtook the Hong Kong mare in the closing stages and held off the late run of Star Witness to win by half a length. Sweet Sanette took third ahead of Overdose, with a gap of two and a half lengths back to War Artist in fifth. After the race Cowell said "I'm overwhelmed. I've got sunglasses on, so you won't notice I'm crying. I've had a bit of flak for running him too much, but he thrives on his racing. He's a game horse and I'm chuffed to bits. It's the best day of my racing life – it's awesome. Over five furlongs he's obviously a very talented horse, but he doesn't get a yard further." Jim Crowley, who was riding his first Royal Ascot winner commented "He travelled well and I hardly had to use my stick – he picked up by himself. He's run four times in a few weeks and loves his racing. He's thriving, improving on it. He broke really well and was a different horse today. I was a little concerned when the rain came as he prefers faster ground, but it's perfect the way it is".

In August Prohibit started at odds of 12/1 in the Nunthorpe Stakes on softer ground at York Racecourse. The fifteen runners split into groups on either side of course and although Prohibit finished first among the horses on the far-side (the left-hand side from the jockey's viewpoint) he was beaten into third by the outsiders Margot Did and Hamish McGonagall who raced up the opposite side of the course.

==== Autumn ====
The Prix du Petit Couvert over 1000 metres at Longchamp on 11 September saw a rematch between Prohibit (carrying a seven-pound weight penalty as a Group One winner) and Hamish McGonagall with Mar Ardentro and War Artist also in the field along with the improving handicapper Spectacle du Mars. Starting at odds of 4.5/1 he tracked the leaders as Hamish McGonagall set the pace before giving way to Mar Ardentro at half distance. Prohibit stayed on strongly, survived a bump with Mar Ardentro in the closing stages and prevailed in the final strides to win by a head. Soumillon on the runner-up lodged an objection, but after an inquiry by the racecourse stewards the result remained unaltered. Jim Crowley said "I was surprised there was an inquiry, because when you look at the head-on, it's Soumillon's horse that comes off the rail. It was a good performance carrying that weight... he's obviously getting quicker." On 2 October was made the 4/1 second favourite in his second attempt to win the Prix de l'Abbaye, but after being hampered and losing his position at half way he finished seventh of the fifteen runner behind Tangerine Trees.

=== 2012–2014: later career ===
Prohibit was back at Meydan in early 2012 but failed to win or place in three starts. He returned to Europe but made only three further appearances that year starting with a seventh-place finish behind Wizz Kid in the Prix du Gros Chêne at Chantilly on 3 June. Later that month he attempted to repeat his 2011 success in the King's Stand Stakes but started a 25/1 outsider and ran accordingly, finishing fifteenth of the twenty-two runners behind the Hong Kong challenger Little Bridge. In July he finished fourth behind his old rival Hamish McGonagall in the Listed City Walls Stakes at York.

After an eleven-month absence, Prohibit returned to the track in 2013 to finish fifth in a Listed race at Maisons-Laffitte Racecourse but made no in seven subsequent races that year. He finished fifteenth in his third King's Stand Stakes, last in a handicap at Ascot and third in a minor race at Nottingham Racecourse in August. He finished last in handicaps at Haydock and Yarmouth in September, fourth in a small race at Kempton in November and last of ten on the Polytrack at Lingfield in December. In January 2014 he ran twice on the synthetic track at Southwell Racecourse, finishing sixth and ninth in minor events before sustaining a knee injury. Cowell announced in February that the gelding would not race again and had been retired to the trainer's Bottisham Heath Stud. In 2016 Cowell reported on his website that Prohibit had made a good recovery from his injury and would be used as a hack by members of the Cowell family.

== Assessment and awards ==
In his best year, 2011, Prohibit was given a rating of 116 in the World Thoroughbred Rankings, making him the 190th best horse in the world and the sixth-best horse in Europe over sprint distances.

== Pedigree ==
Pedigree of Prohibit (GB), bay gelding, 2005
Sire Oasis Dream (GB) 2000	Green Desert (USA); 1983	Danzig	Northern Dancer
Sire Oasis Dream (GB) 2000	Green Desert (USA); 1983	Danzig	Pas de Nom
Sire Oasis Dream (GB) 2000	Green Desert (USA); 1983	Foreign Courier	Sir Ivor
Sire Oasis Dream (GB) 2000	Green Desert (USA); 1983	Foreign Courier	Courtly Dee
Sire Oasis Dream (GB) 2000	Hope (IRE); 1991	Dancing Brave	Lyphard
Sire Oasis Dream (GB) 2000	Hope (IRE); 1991	Dancing Brave	Navajo Princess
Sire Oasis Dream (GB) 2000	Hope (IRE); 1991	Bahamian	Mill Reef
Sire Oasis Dream (GB) 2000	Hope (IRE); 1991	Bahamian	Sorbus
Dam Well Warned (GB) 1994	Warning (GB); 1985	Known Fact	In Reality
Dam Well Warned (GB) 1994	Warning (GB); 1985	Known Fact	Tamerett
Dam Well Warned (GB) 1994	Warning (GB); 1985	Slightly Dangerous	Roberto
Dam Well Warned (GB) 1994	Warning (GB); 1985	Slightly Dangerous	Where You Lead
Dam Well Warned (GB) 1994	Well Beyond (IRE); 1989	Don't Forget Me	Ahonoora
Dam Well Warned (GB) 1994	Well Beyond (IRE); 1989	Don't Forget Me	African Doll
Dam Well Warned (GB) 1994	Well Beyond (IRE); 1989	Mariakova	The Minstrel
Dam Well Warned (GB) 1994	Well Beyond (IRE); 1989	Mariakova	Mofida (Family: 9-e)
