= Abernant Stakes =

Flat horse race in Britain

- Class: Group 3
- Location: Rowley Mile; Newmarket, England
- Inaugurated: 1969
- Race type: Flat / Thoroughbred
- Sponsor: Blandford Bloodstock
- Website: Newmarket

Race information
- Distance: 6f (1,207 metres)
- Surface: Turf
- Track: Straight
- Qualification: Three-years-old and up
- Weight: 8 st 12 lb (3yo); 9 st 9 lb (4yo+); Allowances; 3 lb for fillies and mares Penalties; 7 lb for Group 1 winners * 5 lb for Group 2 winners * 3 lb for Group 3 winners * * since 31 August last year
- Purse: £85,000 (2025); 1st: £48,204

Abernant Stakes
2026
Run To Freedom	Aramram	Quinault

Previous years
2025
Sajir	Grand Grey	Lethal Levi
2024
Washington Heights	Mill Stream	Spycatcher
2023
Garrus	Commanche Falls	Creative Force
2022
Double Or Bubble	Garrus	Jumby
2021
Summerghand	Oxted	Emaraaty Ana

2020-2011
2020
Oxted	Breathtaking Look	Emaraaty Ana
2019
Keystroke	Yafta	Brando
2018
Brando	Sir Dancealot	Projection
2017
Brando	Ornate	Windfast
2016
Magical Memory	Tupi	Mattmu
2015
Astaire	Watchable	Music Master
2014
Hamza	Es Que Love	Aljamaaheer
2013
Tickled Pink	Jimmy Styles	Move in Time
2012
Mayson	Jimmy Styles	Internationaldebut
2011
Genki	Iver Bridge Lad	Dinkum Diamond

2010-2001
2010
Equiano	Mullionmileanhour	Doncaster Rover
2009
Tax Free	Equiano	Knot in Wood
2008
Zidane	Assertive	Dark Missile
2007
Asset	Assertive	Paradise Isle
2006
Paradise Isle	Les Arcs	Beckermet
2005
Quito	Ashdown Express	The Kiddykid
2004
Arakan	Frizzante	Ashdown Express
2003
Needwood Blade	Resplendent Cee	Ashdown Express
2002
Reel Buddy	Continent	Needwood Blade
2001
Primo Valentino	Fath	Superior Premium

2000-1991
2000
Cretan Gift	Warningford	Gorse
1999
Bold Edge	Cretan Gift	Gorse
1998
Tedburrow	Cretan Gift	Danetime
1997
Monaassib	Easy Dollar	Sylva Paradise
1996
Passion For Life	Iktamal	Struggler
1995
Lake Coniston	Triple Joy	Montendre
1994
Midhish	Splice	Rafferty's Rules
1993
Splice	Montendre	Artistic Reef
1992
Fylde Flyer	Case Law	Sir Harry Hardman
1991
Case Law	Elbio	Nicholas

1990-1988
1990
Sharp Reminder	Elapse	A Prayer For Wings
1989
Point Of Light	Sharp Reminder	Access Travel
1988
Rich Charlie	Umbelata	Whippet

The Abernant Stakes is a Group 3 flat horse race in Great Britain open to horses aged three years or older. It is run over a distance of 6 furlongs (1,207 metres) on the Rowley Mile at Newmarket in mid-April.

== History ==
The event is named after Abernant, a successful sprinter in the late 1940s and early 1950s. It was established in 1969, and the first running was won by Song.

For a period the race held Listed status. It was promoted to Group 3 level in 2013.

The race is currently staged on the second day of Newmarket's three-day Craven Meeting. It is run on the same day as the Craven Stakes.

The leading horses from the Abernant Stakes sometimes go on to compete in the Palace House Stakes or the Duke of York Stakes.

== Records ==
Most successful horse (4 wins):

- Boldboy – 1974, 1976, 1977, 1978

Leading jockey (4 wins):

- Joe Mercer – Song (1969), Shiny Tenth (1972), Boldboy (1974, 1976)

Leading trainer (5 wins):

- Kevin Ryan – Hamza (2014), Astaire (2015), Brando (2017, 2018), Washington Heights (2024)

== Winners ==
Year	Winner	Age	Jockey	Trainer	Time
1969	Song	3	Joe Mercer	Derrick Candy	1:16.08
1970	Crooner	4	John Gorton	Doug Smith	1:19.43
1971	Realm	4	Brian Taylor	John Winter	1:14.50
1972	Shiny Tenth	5	Joe Mercer	Doug Marks	1:16.91
1973	Balliol	4	Brian Taylor	John Winter	1:12.86
1974	Boldboy	4	Joe Mercer	Dick Hern	1:12.96
1975	Midsummer Star	5	Alan Bond	Mick Masson	1:21.88
1976	Boldboy	6	Joe Mercer	Dick Hern	1:12.50
1977	Boldboy	7	Willie Carson	Dick Hern	1:13.91
1978	Boldboy	8	Willie Carson	Dick Hern	1:15.85
1979	Vaigly Great	4	Greville Starkey	Michael Stoute	1:13.53
1980	Gypsy Dancer	5	Lester Piggott	Bill O'Gorman	1:12.79
1981	Rabdan	4	Lester Piggott	Robert Armstrong	1:14.61
1982	Lightning Label	6	Steve Cauthen	Paul Kelleway	1:12.52
1983	Sweet Monday	5	Philip Waldron	Jack Holt	1:17.26
1984	Reesh	3	Taffy Thomas	Bill O'Gorman	1:13.13
1985	Grey Desire	5	Pat Eddery	Mel Brittain	1:13.40
1986	Homo Sapien	4	Steve Cauthen	Henry Cecil	1:16.99
1987	Governor General	4	Brian Rouse	David Elsworth	1:15.22
1988	Rich Charlie	4	Paul Eddery	Charlie Nelson	1:14.57
1989	Point of Light	4	Paul Eddery	Geoff Lewis	1:13.94
1990	Sharp Reminder	6	Bruce Raymond	Colin Williams	1:11.61
1991	Case Law	4	George Duffield	Sir Mark Prescott	1:11.36
1992	Fylde Flyer	3	Lester Piggott	Jack Berry	1:12.76
1993	Splice	4	Walter Swinburn	James Fanshawe	1:13.39
1994	Midhish	4	Walter Swinburn	Ben Hanbury	1:13.73
1995	Lake Coniston	4	Pat Eddery	Geoff Lewis	1:10.25
1996	Passion for Life	3	Pat Eddery	Geoff Lewis	1:11.49
1997	Monaassib	6	Daragh O'Donohoe	Ed Dunlop	1:11.42
1998	Tedburrow	6	Kieren Fallon	Eric Alston	1:14.02
1999	Bold Edge	4	Dane O'Neill	Richard Hannon Sr.	1:11.68
2000	Cretan Gift	9	Tom McLaughlin	Nick Littmoden	1:13.30
2001	Primo Valentino	4	Richard Quinn	Peter Harris	1:12.94
2002	Reel Buddy	4	Jimmy Fortune	Richard Hannon Sr.	1:11.02
2003	Needwood Blade	5	Seb Sanders	Bryan McMahon	1:13.87
2004	Arakan	4	Kieren Fallon	Sir Michael Stoute	1:12.37
2005	Quito	8	Tony Culhane	David Chapman	1:12.14
2006	Paradise Isle	5	Kevin Darley	Chris Wall	1:10.50
2007	Asset	4	Richard Hughes	Richard Hannon Sr.	1:09.64
2008	Zidane	6	Jamie Spencer	James Fanshawe	1:12.56
2009	Tax Free	7	Franny Norton	David Nicholls	1:10.30
2010	Equiano	5	Michael Hills	Barry Hills	1:11.07
2011	Genki	7	Steve Drowne	Roger Charlton	1:11.12
2012	Mayson	4	Paul Hanagan	Richard Fahey	1:11.86
2013	Tickled Pink	4	Tom Queally	Sir Henry Cecil	1:09.88
2014	Hamza	5	Jamie Spencer	Kevin Ryan	1:09.88
2015	Astaire	4	Jamie Spencer	Kevin Ryan	1:12.09
2016	Magical Memory	4	Frankie Dettori	Charles Hills	1:14.84
2017	Brando	5	Tom Eaves	Kevin Ryan	1:10.19
2018	Brando	6	Tom Eaves	Kevin Ryan	1:12.34
2019	Keystroke	7	Adam Kirby	Stuart Williams	1:11.64
2020 (Note: The 2020 race was run in June, due to the COVID-19 pandemic in the United Kingdom)	Oxted	4	Cieren Fallon	Roger Teal	1:09.39
2021	Summerghand	7	Daniel Tudhope	David O'Meara	1:12.43
2022	Double Or Bubble	5	Jack Mitchell	Chris Wall	1:10.53
2023	Garrus	7	Ryan Moore	Charles Hills	1:15.11
2024	Washington Heights	4	Tom Eaves	Kevin Ryan	1:09.53
2025	Sajir	4	Oisin Murphy	André Fabre	1:13.41
2026	Run To Freedom	8	Rob Hornby	Henry Candy	1:10.58

== See also ==
- Horse racing in Great Britain
- List of British flat horse races
