= Equiano (horse) =

French-bred Thoroughbred racehorse

- Sire: Acclamation
- Grandsire: Royal Applause
- Dam: Entente Cordiale
- Damsire: Ela-Mana-Mou
- Sex: Stallion
- Foaled: 27 February 2005
- Country: France
- Colour: Bay
- Breeder: Ecurie Skymarc Farm
- Owner: Félix Sánchez Blanco; James Acheson
- Trainer: Mauricio Delcher Sánchez; Barry Hills
- Record: 27: 7-6-2
- Earnings: £571,273

Major wins
- Prix des Sorbiers (2008); King's Stand Stakes (2008, 2010); Abernant Stakes (2010); Palace House Stakes (2010)

Awards
- Timeform rating 127

Equiano (foaled 27 February 2005) is a French-bred Thoroughbred racehorse and sire. A specialist sprinter, he began his racing career in Spain where he won two races as a two-year-old in 2007. He began his second season in France, winning the Listed Prix des Sorbiers before being sent to England where he recorded an upset victory in the Group One King's Stand Stakes at Royal Ascot. He was then relocated to England but failed to win in 2009 before returning to his best form as a five-year-old in 2010. In that year he won the Abernant Stakes and the Palace House Stakes before winning the King's Stand Stakes for a second time. After his retirement from racing he became a breeding stallion and had had some success as a sire of winners.

== Background ==
Equiano was a bay horse with no white socks on his hind legs bred in France by Ecurie Skymarc Farm. He was from the first crop of foals sired by Acclamation, a high-class sprinter who won the Diadem Stakes in 2003. The best of his other progeny was Dark Angel, who won the Middle Park Stakes before becoming a successful breeding stallion. Equiano's dam Entente Cordiale showed little ability as a racehorse, producing her best effort in three races when finishing third in a maiden race at Cork Racecourse in March 2002. She was a descendant of the American broodmare Mock Orange, the ancestor of several good winners including Cryptoclearance, Devil May Care and Regal Ransom (UAE Derby).

As a foal in December 2005 Equiano was offered for sale at Deauville and was bought for €26,000 by Cuadra Madroños SL. He entered the ownership of Félix Sánchez Blanco and was sent to race in Spain where he was sent into training with Mauricio Delcher Sánchez near Madrid.

== Racing career ==
=== 2007: two-year-old season ===
As a two-year-old in Spain, Equiano ran five times in Spain winning races at San Sebastián in August and at Madrid's La Zarzuela racecourse in September. On his final appearance of the year he was sent to France to contest the Group Two Critérium de Maisons-Laffitte over 1200 metres on 2 November. He started the 25/1 outsider of the nine-runner field but kept on well in the closing stages to finish third behind the German colt Pomellato.

=== 2008: three-year-old season ===
Though still based in Spain, Equiano was campaigned in France in the spring of 2008, beginning the season by finishing second to Verba in the Prix Le Sancy over 1200 metres at Maisons-Laffitte on 7 April. On 20 May the colt was partnered by Olivier Peslier when he started 1.7/1 favourite for the Listed Prix des Sorbiers over 1100 metres at Chantilly Racecourse and won by two lengths from Jane Blue. He was then moved up in class for the Group Three Prix du Gros Chêne over 1000 metres at Chantilly on 1 June. Ridden by Christophe Soumillon he started an 18/1 outsider but exceeded expectations as he took the lead in the last 200 metres before being overtaken and beaten a neck by the leading French sprinter Marchand d'Or. After his runs at Chantilly the colt was sold to James Acheson who kept him under Spanish-based training.

On his next appearance, Equiano was sent to England to contest the Group One King's Stand Stakes over five furlongs at Royal Ascot on 17 June in which he was ridden by Peslier and started a 22/1 outsider in a thirteen-runner field. The favourite for the race was the filly Fleeting Spirit, whilst the other British runners included Kingsgate Native, Benbaun (Prix de l'Abbaye), Dandy Man (Palace House Stakes), Hoh Mike (Sprint Stakes), Moorhouse Lad (King George Stakes) and Enticing (Molecomb Stakes). The other international challengers were Takeover Target and Magnus (The Galaxy) from Australia, Abraham Lincoln from Ireland and National Colour from South Africa. Racing up the stands side (the left-hand side from the jockeys viewpoint) Equiano led from the start and always looked the most likely winner despite hanging slightly right in the closing stages. He won by half a length and a neck from Takeover Target and Fleeting Spirit. After the race Peslier commented "He ran very well in France last time and today was the big ambition. The horse has a lot of speed and he travels well. The trainer said he would be better to stay behind and get cover but I said over five furlongs he'd be better in front. He was handy and everything went right for him".

After his win at Ascot Equiano remained in England and was transferred to the stable of Barry Hills at Lambourn. In August he started favourite for the Nunthorpe Stakes (run that year at Newmarket Racecourse) but finished fourth behind Borderlescott, National Colour and Kingsgate Native. On his final run of the season he finished ninth behind Marchand d'Or in the Prix de l'Abbaye at Longchamp Racecourse on 5 October.

=== 2009: four-year-old season ===
In most of his races as a four-year-old, Equiano was ridden by his trainer's son Michael Hills. He produced his best performance on his seasonal debut when he started favourite for the Abernant Stakes at Newmarket Racecourse in April and finished second, beaten half a length by the seven-year-old gelding Tax Free. Equiano failed to win or place in his remaining eight races in 2009. He finished well beaten in the Duke of York Stakes, Prix du Gros Chêne, King's Stand Stakes, July Cup, King George Stakes, Nunthorpe Stakes, Haydock Sprint Cup and Prix de l'Abbaye.

=== 2010: five-year-old season ===
Equiano began his fourth season in the Abernant Stakes over six furlongs at Newmarket on 15 April in which he was ridden by Michael Hills (as in all of his races that year) and started the 11/4 favourite. After taking the lead soon after the start he was hard-pressed in the closing stages and "just held on" to win by a short-head from the four-year-old Mullionmileanhour and record his first success for 22 months. In the Group Three Palace House Stakes at the same course on 1 May he started second favourite behind the 2009 winner Amour Propre in a field which also included Borderlescott, Sole Power and Total Gallery (Prix de l'Abbaye). Equiano led from the start and "stayed on gamely" to beat Borderlescott by three quarters of a length. Barry Hills commented "Michael rode him last Saturday and said he gave him the best feeling a horse had given him. I am sure the King's Stand will be on the agenda, but I'm not sure if we'll have another race first". Three weeks later Equiano started joint-favourite alongside Kingsgate Native in the Temple Stakes at Haydock Park. He led for most of the way but was overtaken by his market rival inside the final furlong and beaten half a length into second place.

On 15 June Equiano attempted to repeat his 2008 success in the King's Stand Stakes and started the 9/2 third choice in the betting behind Kingsgate Native and the Australian challenger Nicconi (winner of the Lightning Stakes). The other nine runners included Borderlescott, Total Gallery, Amour Propre, Gold Trail (Railway Stakes) and Markab. Equiano quickly took the lead and "ran on gamely" in the final furlong to win by one and a half lengths from Markab with Borderlescott taking third ahead of Nicconi. After the race Barry Hills said "He's a very fast horse and he was always going to win today because he's in such good form." Michael Hills said, "He stumbled coming out of the gates but once he was back on his feet he was off. What a thrill! Someone beeped a car horn at the three pole and he went even faster."

On 9 July the horse returned to six furlongs for the July Cup at Newmarket and finished second of the fourteen runners, beaten half a length by the Australian import Starspangledbanner. In the Nunthorpe Stakes at York Racecourse on 20 August he started slowly, was hampered in the first furlong and never looked likely to win. Michael Hills eased the horse down in the closing stages and Equiano finished last of the twelve runners behind Sole Power. A training setback prompted the announcement of his retirement on 15 September. Barry Hills commented "Equiano was one of the fastest horses I have trained and the exceptional speed he demonstrated in winning this year's King's Stand Stakes marked him out as a very special sprinter. He was also a very sound horse and a perfect horse to deal with in every way."

== Stud career ==
After his retirement from racing, Equiano became a breeding stallion at the Newsells Park Stud in Hertfordshire. He has also been shuttled to stand in Australia for the southern hemisphere breeding season. The best of his offspring have been The Tin Man (British Champions Sprint Stakes), Belvoir Bay (Breeders' Cup Turf Sprint) and Strath Burn (Hackwood Stakes).

== Pedigree ==
Pedigree of Equiano (FR), bay stallion, 2005
| Sire Acclamation (GB) 1999 | Royal Applause (GB); 1993 | Waajib | Try My Best |
| Sire Acclamation (GB) 1999 | Royal Applause (GB); 1993 | Waajib | Corvana |
| Sire Acclamation (GB) 1999 | Royal Applause (GB); 1993 | Flying Melody | Auction Ring |
| Sire Acclamation (GB) 1999 | Royal Applause (GB); 1993 | Flying Melody | Whispering Star |
| Sire Acclamation (GB) 1999 | Princess Athena (IRE); 1985 | Ahonoora | Lorenzaccio |
| Sire Acclamation (GB) 1999 | Princess Athena (IRE); 1985 | Ahonoora | Helen Nichols |
| Sire Acclamation (GB) 1999 | Princess Athena (IRE); 1985 | Shopping Wise | Floribunda |
| Sire Acclamation (GB) 1999 | Princess Athena (IRE); 1985 | Shopping Wise | Sea Melody |
| Dam Entente Cordiale (IRE) 1998 | Ela-Mana-Mou (IRE); 1976 | Pitcairn | Petingo |
| Dam Entente Cordiale (IRE) 1998 | Ela-Mana-Mou (IRE); 1976 | Pitcairn | Border Bounty |
| Dam Entente Cordiale (IRE) 1998 | Ela-Mana-Mou (IRE); 1976 | Rose Bertin | High Hat |
| Dam Entente Cordiale (IRE) 1998 | Ela-Mana-Mou (IRE); 1976 | Rose Bertin | Wide Awake |
| Dam Entente Cordiale (IRE) 1998 | Mirmande (GB); 1992 | Kris | Sharpen Up |
| Dam Entente Cordiale (IRE) 1998 | Mirmande (GB); 1992 | Kris | Doubly Sure |
| Dam Entente Cordiale (IRE) 1998 | Mirmande (GB); 1992 | Secala | Secretariat |
| Dam Entente Cordiale (IRE) 1998 | Mirmande (GB); 1992 | Secala | Aladancer (Family: 4-m) |
