= Kyllachy =

British Thoroughbred racehorse

- Sire: Pivotal
- Grandsire: Polar Falcon
- Dam: Pretty Poppy
- Damsire: Song
- Sex: Stallion
- Foaled: 25 February 1998
- Country: United Kingdom
- Colour: Bay
- Breeder: Wheelersland Stud
- Owner: Thurloe Thoroughbreds V Cheveley Park Stud
- Trainer: Henry Candy
- Record: 12: 6-3-1
- Earnings: £211,248

Major wins
- Palace House Stakes (2002); Temple Stakes (2002); Nunthorpe Stakes (2002)

Kyllachy (foaled 25 February 1998) is a British Thoroughbred racehorse and sire. Named after a Scottish grouse moor, he was a specialist sprinter who was usually held up for a late run. His early form was promising but unremarkable as he won two minor races from seven starts in his first two seasons. As a four-year-old in 2002 he showed exceptional improvement and established himself as arguably the best sprinter in Europe. He won four races of increasing importance including the Palace House Stakes and the Temple Stakes before recording his biggest win in the Nunthorpe Stakes. He sustained an injury in the last-named race and was retired from racing shortly afterwards. He later became a very successful sire: his progeny have included the Cartier Champion Sprinter Sole Power.

== Background ==
Kyllachy is a bay horse with a small white star standing 16 hands high, bred by the Berkshire-based Wheelersland Stud. He was a powerful, heavily built individual: one of his jockeys said that "if you let the horse out in a field of bullocks you wouldn't know the difference." His sire Pivotal was a top class sprinter who won the King's Stand Stakes and the Nunthorpe Stakes in 1996. He went on to become an "excellent" sire, getting the winners of more than a thousand races across a range of distances including Sariska, Somnus, Farhh and Excellent Art. Kyllachy's dam Pretty Poppy won one minor race from thirteen attempts in 1990 and 1991. Her female-line ancestry made her a distant relative of the outstanding racemare Swiss Maid.

As a yearling the colt was sent to the St Leger Sale at Doncaster in September 1999 and was bought for 36,000 guineas by Will Edmeades, a bloodstock agent whose other purchases have included Sir Percy and Presvis. Edmeades was acting on behalf of Thurloe Thoroughbreds, a group of syndicates formed in 1995 by established in 1995 by James Stafford whilst the under-bidder at the auction was the trainer Henry Candy who was acting on behalf of Peter Deal. After some negotiation Deal joined the syndicate and Candy trained the horse at Kingstone Warren in Oxfordshire. Candy had enjoyed great success with middle-distance performers such as Time Charter and Master Willie in the 1980s but had struggled for winners in the 1990s before re-emerging as a trainer of sprinters.

== Racing career ==
=== 2000: two-year-old season ===
Kyllachy began his racing career in a five-furlong maiden race at Chepstow Racecourse on 10 August. Ridden as in most of his early races by Chris Rutter, he recovered from being hampered at halfway to take the lead in the final furlong and won by a neck from Attorney. The colt then started 11/8 favourite for a minor race on heavy ground at Beverley Racecourse but was overtaken in the closing stages and beaten two and a half lengths by the filly My Lovely. On his third and final appearance of the season the colt carried top weight of 133 pounds in nursery handicap at Sandown Park Racecourse on 30 September. He finished second by a neck to Adweb, to whom he was conceding 25 pounds.

=== 2001: three-year-old season ===
On his first appearance of 2001, Kyllachy contested minor handicap over five furlongs at Sandown in April. Ridden by Kieren Fallon, he was held up at the rear of the fourteen runner field and struggled to obtain a clear run in the last quarter mile. When Fallon switched to the right in the closing stages, Kyllachy accelerated into the lead and drew away from the field to win "easily" by five lengths. After a break of three months, the colt was moved up in class and sent to France for the Listed Prix du Cercle at Deauville Racecourse on 2 August and finished second to the French-trained Do The Honours. Eighteen days later the colt finished fourth when favourite for a minor stakes race at Nottingham. He ended his second year by finishing fourth in a handicap at Ascot Racecourse in September.

=== 2002: four-year-old season ===
Jamie Spencer took over as Kyllachy's jockey in 2002 and rode him in all five of his races. The colt began his third season in a handicap at Newbury Racecourse in April and won by one and three quarter lengths after accelerating into the lead inside the final furlong. On 4 May, Kyllachy was moved up to Group Three class for the first time and started the 2/1 favourite for the Palace House Stakes over five furlongs on good to firm ground at Newmarket. His main rivals in the betting were Continent, Smokin Beau (winner of the Portland Handicap) and Speed Lord (Field Marshal Stakes), whilst the other runners included Jessica's Dream (Ballyogan Stakes), The Trader (World Trophy) and Bahamian Pirate. Kyllachy was restrained by Spencer before finishing strongly to catch Smokin Beau in the final stride and win by a short head.

On 2 June, Kyllachy was stepped up in class again for the Group Two Temple Stakes at Sandown and started 9/2 third choice in the betting behind Invincible Spirit and Misraah (Sprint Stakes). Smokin Beau, Bahamian Pirate and Continent were again opposition whilst the other contenders included Kier Park (Cornwallis Stakes) and Vision of Night (Goldene Peitsche). After being held up in the early stages, Kyllachy took the lead approaching the final stages and sprinted clear in the closing stages to win by four lengths from Vision of Night. At Royal Ascot in June, the colt was made 11/10 favourite in a fifteen-runner field for the King's Stand Stakes. Before the race a majority share in the colt had been bought by the Cheveley Park Stud. He struggled to obtain a clear run in the last quarter mile and although he finished strongly he finished third, beaten a head and half a length by Dominica (a three-year-old filly) and Continent.

Kyllachy moved into Group One class for the first time in the Nunthorpe Stakes over five furlongs at York Racecourse on 22 August and started the 3/1 favourite against sixteen opponents. His rivals included many familiar names including Dominica, Continent, Jessicas's Dream, Bahamian Pirate, Smokin Beau and The Trader whilst other major contenders were Malhub (Golden Jubilee Stakes) and Danehurst (Flying Five). The 66/1 outsider Lady Dominatrix set the pace whilst Spencer restrained Kyllachy before switching to the far side (the left-hand side from the jockey's viewpoint) at halfway. Malhub took the lead inside the final furlong but Kyllachy ran on well to take the lead in the final strides and won by half a length. The outsider Indian Prince took third ahead of Continent and Dominica. After the race Candy said "That was not exactly the plan to go on to the far side. I did say go left a little but I thought he would go up the middle. Obviously the horse was happy going that way so Jamie let him go all the way. He's not only an exceedingly good horse but he is the most delightful character and he is very, very fast". When asked to compare the colt to other great modern sprinters he commented "I know you'd expect me to say amongst the best of them but I mean that. He's got the gift of being able to quicken up off the very strongest pace. He just changes onto his left leg, gets lower and goes quicker".

After his win at York, Kyllachy suffered from some soreness in his leg which was explained by bruising behind his right knee. Although he recovered soundness there was not enough time for him to be trained to full fitness for the Prix de l'Abbaye and his retirement was announced at the end of September. Candy said "It's just a pity that time ran out for the Prix de l'Abbaye. The yard will sorely miss him. Following his three weeks recommended box rest, he is now completely sound, and x-rays of his right knee look good. He will exercise here for ten days, and then go to Cheveley Park Stud".

== Assessment ==
On Kyllachy's retirement, Candy called him the best sprinter he had trained whilst Spencer described the colt as "by far the fastest" he had ridden.

== Stud career ==
Kyllachy was retired from racing to become a breeding stallion at the Cheveley Park Stud in Newmarket. He had considerable success as a sire, with his progeny showing their best form over sprint distances. The best of his offspring have included Sole Power, Krypton Factor (Dubai Golden Shaheen), Dim Sum (Chairman's Sprint Prize), Twilight Son (Haydock Sprint Cup), Arabian Gleam (Challenge Stakes), Tariq (Lennox Stakes), Penitent (Joel Stakes) and Stepper Point (Sapphire Stakes). He was retired from stud duties in September 2017 at the age of 19.

== Pedigree ==
Pedigree of Kyllachy (GB), bay stallion, 1998
Sire Pivotal (GB) 1993	Polar Falcon (USA); 1987	Nureyev	Northern Dancer
Sire Pivotal (GB) 1993	Polar Falcon (USA); 1987	Nureyev	Special
Sire Pivotal (GB) 1993	Polar Falcon (USA); 1987	Marie d'Argonne	Jefferson
Sire Pivotal (GB) 1993	Polar Falcon (USA); 1987	Marie d'Argonne	Mohair
Sire Pivotal (GB) 1993	Fearless Revival (GB); 1987	Cozzene	Caro
Sire Pivotal (GB) 1993	Fearless Revival (GB); 1987	Cozzene	Ride The Trails
Sire Pivotal (GB) 1993	Fearless Revival (GB); 1987	Stufida	Bustino
Sire Pivotal (GB) 1993	Fearless Revival (GB); 1987	Stufida	Zerbinetta
Dam Pretty Poppy (GB) 1988	Song (GB); 1966	Sing Sing	Tudor Minstrel
Dam Pretty Poppy (GB) 1988	Song (GB); 1966	Sing Sing	Agin the Law
Dam Pretty Poppy (GB) 1988	Song (GB); 1966	Intent	Vilmorin
Dam Pretty Poppy (GB) 1988	Song (GB); 1966	Intent	Under Canvas
Dam Pretty Poppy (GB) 1988	Moonlight Serenade (GB); 1978	Crooner	Sammy Davis
Dam Pretty Poppy (GB) 1988	Moonlight Serenade (GB); 1978	Crooner	Crupper
Dam Pretty Poppy (GB) 1988	Moonlight Serenade (GB); 1978	March Moonlight	March Past
Dam Pretty Poppy (GB) 1988	Moonlight Serenade (GB); 1978	March Moonlight	Mandragora (Family: 1-g)
