= Flying Five Stakes =

- Class: Group 1
- Location: Curragh Racecourse; County Kildare, Ireland
- Race type: Flat / Thoroughbred
- Sponsor: Al Basti Equiworld
- Website: Curragh

Race information
- Distance: 5f (1,006 metres)
- Surface: Turf
- Track: Straight
- Qualification: Three-years-old and up
- Weight: 9 st 3 lb (3yo); 9 st 4 lb (4yo+); Allowances; 3 lb for fillies and mares
- Purse: €376,000 (2022); 1st: €236,000

Flying Five Stakes
2026
Comanche Brave	American Affair	Rumstar

Previous years
2025
Arizona Blaze	Nighteyes	Bucanero Fuerte
2024
Bradsell	Believing	Makarova
2023
Moss Tucker	Get Ahead	Equality
2022
Highfield Princess	Erosandpsyche	Flotus
2021
Romantic Proposal	A Case Of You	Glass Slippers

2020-2011
2020
Glass Slippers	Keep Busy	Sonaiyla
2019
Fairyland	So Perfect	Invincible Army
2018
Havana Grey	Son Of Rest	Sioux Nation
2017
Caravaggio	Alphabet	Son Of Rest
2016
Ardhoomey	Washington DC	Iffranesia
2015
Sole Power	Maarek	Take Cover
2014
Stepper Point	Sir Maximilian	Russian Soul
2013
Dutch Masterpiece	Hamza	Russian Soul
2012
My Girl Anna	Fire Lily	Inxile
2011
Amour Propre	Sole Power	Roicead

2010-2001
2010
Astrophysical Jet	Tax Free	Santo Padre
2009
Reverence	Judge 'n Jury	Sugar Free
2008
Look Busy	Masta Plasta	Wi Dud
2007
Benbaun	Dandy Man	Moss Vale
2006
Benbaun	Desert Lord	Leitra
2005
Benbaun	The Tatling	The Trader
2004
Ringmoor Down	Benbaun	Osterhase
2003
Deportivo	Daganya	Cool Cousin
2002
Danehurst	Lady Dominatrix	Jessica's Dream
2001
Ishiguru	Indian Spark	Repertory

2000-1992
2000
Namid	Tedburrow	Aretha
1999
Tedburrow	Timote	Antinnaz
1998
Tedburrow	Rhine Valley	Notluckytochange
1997
Midnight Escape	Hopping Higgins	Ailleacht
1996
Eveningperformance	Ailleacht	Catch The Blues
1995
Bunty Boo	Petite Fantasy	Millyant
1994
Tropical	Ridgewood Ben	Millyant
1993
Tropical	Stack Rock	Palacegate Episode
1992
Flowing	Park Dream	Poolesta

The Flying Five Stakes is a Group 1 flat horse race in Ireland open to thoroughbreds, aged three years or older. It is run at the Curragh over a distance of 5 furlongs (1,006 metres), and it is scheduled to take place each year in September during Irish Champions Weekend.

== History ==
The event was formerly held at Phoenix Park, and it used to be classed at Listed level. For a period it was open to horses aged two or older. It was promoted to Group 3 status in 1988, and transferred to Leopardstown in 1991.

The race was moved to the Curragh and upgraded to Group 2 level in 2002. The minimum age of participating horses was raised to three in 2003, and the event reverted to Group 3 status in 2004. It was previously run in late August or early September but from 2014 it was moved to mid-September and became part of the Irish Champions Weekend fixture, switching places in the calendar with the Renaissance Stakes. It was reinstated as a Group 2 race in 2015 and upgraded to Group 1 status in 2018, when it became the first Group 1 sprint in Ireland open to horses aged three years and older.

The Flying Five Stakes was sponsored by bettor.com prior to 2013. It was previously sponsored by Moyglare Stud, and its full title included the name of Market Slide, a successful Moyglare broodmare. It was unsponsored in 2013, and Derrinstown Stud took over the sponsorship in 2014.

== Records ==
Most successful horse since 1985 (3 wins):

- Benbaun – 2005, 2006, 2007

Leading jockey since 1985 (6 wins):

- Michael Kinane – Committed (1985), Flowing (1991), Tropical (1993, 1994), Ishiguru (2001), Ringmoor Down (2004)

Leading trainer since 1985 (5 wins):

- Dermot Weld – Committed (1985), Flowing (1991, 1992), Tropical (1993, 1994)

== Winners since 1985 ==
Year	Winner	Age	Jockey	Trainer	Time
1985	Committed	5	Michael Kinane	Dermot Weld	1:00.20
1986	Acushla	3	Pat Eddery	Vincent O'Brien	0:56.80
1987	Polonia	3	Stephen Craine	Jim Bolger	0:57.20
1988	Heather Seeker	2	Declan Gillespie	Liam Browne	0:59.20
1989	Handsome Sailor	6	Michael Hills	Barry Hills	0:57.70
1990	Boozy	3	Richard Fox	Jack Berry	0:56.40
1991	Flowing	3	Michael Kinane	Dermot Weld	1:00.20
1992	Flowing	4	Pat Shanahan	Dermot Weld	1:00.40
1993	Tropical	3	Michael Kinane	Dermot Weld	0:59.40
1994	Tropical	4	Michael Kinane	Dermot Weld	1:00.20
1995	Bunty Boo	6	Michael Hills	Richard Hannon Sr.	0:58.70
1996	Eveningperformance	5	Chris Rutter	Henry Candy	0:57.80
1997	Midnight Escape	4	Kevin Darley	Chris Wall	0:59.90
1998	Tedburrow	6	Willie Supple	Eric Alston	1:02.50
1999	Tedburrow	7	Willie Supple	Eric Alston	1:02.10
2000	Namid	4	Johnny Murtagh	John Oxx	0:58.60
2001	Ishiguru	3	Michael Kinane	Aidan O'Brien	0:59.50
2002	Danehurst	4	George Duffield	Sir Mark Prescott	0:58.30
2003	Deportivo	3	Richard Hughes	Roger Charlton	0:57.70
2004	Ringmoor Down	5	Michael Kinane	David Arbuthnot	0:58.60
2005	Benbaun	4	Jamie Spencer	Mark Wallace	0:59.20
2006	Benbaun	5	Pat Smullen	Mark Wallace	0:57.50
2007	Benbaun	6	Pat Smullen	Mark Wallace	0:58.79
2008	Look Busy	3	Slade O'Hara	Alan Berry	1:00.75
2009	Reverence	8	Willie Supple	Eric Alston	1:05.44
2010	Astrophysical Jet	3	Graham Gibbons	Ed McMahon	0:58.56
2011	Amour Propre	5	Dane O'Neill	Henry Candy	0:58.34
2012	My Girl Anna	5	Rory Cleary	Muredach Kelly	1:04.62
2013	Dutch Masterpiece	3	Joseph O'Brien	Gary Moore	0:58.00
2014	Stepper Point	5	Martin Dwyer	William Muir	0:59.04
2015	Sole Power	8	Chris Hayes	Edward Lynam	1:01.29
2016	Ardhoomey	4	Colin Keane	Ger Lyons	1:01.54
2017	Caravaggio	3	Ryan Moore	Aidan O'Brien	1:00.54
2018	Havana Grey	3	Richard Kingscote	Karl Burke	0:59.59
2019	Fairyland	3	Ryan Moore	Aidan O'Brien	0:57.88
2020	Glass Slippers	4	Tom Eaves	Kevin Ryan	1:00.58
2021	Romantic Proposal	5	Chris Hayes	Edward Lynam	0:59.77
2022	Highfield Princess	5	Jason Hart	John Quinn	1:02.51
2023	Moss Tucker	5	Billy Lee	Ken Condon	1:00.89
2024	Bradsell	4	Hollie Doyle	Archie Watson	0:57.25
2025	Arizona Blaze	3	David Egan	Adrian Murray	0:59.03
2026	Comanche Brave	4	Billy Loughnane	Donnacha O'Brien	0:58.80

== See also ==
- Horse racing in Ireland
- List of Irish flat horse races
