= Twilight Son =

British-bred Thoroughbred racehorse

- Racing silks of Godfrey Wilson
- Sire: Kyllachy
- Grandsire: Pivotal
- Dam: Twlilight Mistress
- Damsire: Bin Ajwaad
- Sex: Stallion
- Foaled: 1 April 2012
- Country: United Kingdom
- Colour: Bay
- Breeder: Caroline Wilson
- Owner: Godfrey Wilson & Cheveley Park Stud
- Trainer: Henry Candy
- Record: 10: 6-1-0
- Earnings: £725,150

Major wins
- 888Sport Charity Sprint (2015); Betfred Sprint Cup (2015); Diamond Jubilee Stakes (2016)

Twilight Son (foaled 1 April 2012) is a British Thoroughbred racehorse and sire. Bred and owned by Caroline and Godfrey Wilson and trained by Henry Candy he was a specialist sprinter who won six of his ten races in a racing career which lasted from August 2014 until October 2016. He won both of his races as a two-year-old and his first three races as a three-year-old including a victory in the Group One Betfred Sprint Cup. As a four-year-old in 2016 he recorded his second Group One success when he defeated a strong international field in the Diamond Jubilee Stakes. He was retired at the end of the season to become a breeding stallion.

== Background ==
Twilight Son is a bay horse with white star and white coronet markings on his hind feet bred in England by Caroline Wilson and owned during his racing career by her husband Godfrey Wilson. Twilight Son was sent into training with the veteran Henry Candy at Kingston Warren in Oxfordshire where he was soon joined by a gelding named Limato.

He was sired by Kyllachy, a top-class sprinter who won the Nunthorpe Stakes in 2002. At stud Kyllachy has sired many successful horses including Sole Power, the Dubai Golden Shaheen winner Krypton Factor and the Chairman's Sprint Prize winner Dim Sum. His dam, Twilight Mistress was a durable but moderate racemare who won three minor handicap races from 36 starts between 2000 and 2003. She was descended from Pennyweight, a half-sister to the Irish 2,000 Guineas winner Wassl.

== Racing career ==
=== 2014: two-year-old season ===
Twilight Son began his racing career in a six furlong maiden race at Salisbury Racecourse on 13 August and started the 5/1 third favourite in a nine-runner field. Ridden by Fergus Sweeney he took the lead inside the final furlong and won by half a length from the favoured Desert Force. Four weeks later, with Sweeney again in the saddle when the colt was assigned a weight of 131 pounds for a Nursery (a handicap race for two-year-olds) at Thirsk Racecourse. Starting the 4/7 favourite he started slowly and had problems obtaining a clear run but went to the front 75 yards from the finish and won by half a length.

=== 2015: three-year-old season ===
On his debut as a three-year-old, Twilight Son started odds-on favourite for a handicap over six furlongs at Newmarket Racecourse on 4 May with the best-fancied of his opponents being Desert Force. After tracking his old rival for most of the way he overtook Desert Force inside the final furlong and drew away to win by two lengths. At York in June Twilight Son was assigned a weight of 122 for a more valuable handicap and started the 5/1 second favourite in a sixteen-runner field. He raced just behind the leaders before taking the lead a furlong out and winning by one and a half lengths from Grandad's World. After the race a majority share in the colt was bought by the Cheveley Park Stud whose managing director Chris Richardson described him as " a very exciting prospect".

After a break of almost three months, Twilight Son returned to the track and was stepped up in class for the Grade One Betfred Sprint Cup over six furlongs at Haydock Park. The 2013 winner Gordon Lord Byron was made the 9/2 joint-favorite alongside Adaay (Sandy Lane Stakes, Hungerford Stakes) with Twilight Son starting at odds of 10/1 in a fifteen-runner field which also included Belardo, Tiggy Wiggy, G Force (winner of the race in 2014), Mattmu (Critérium de Maisons-Laffitte), Danzeno (Chipchase Stakes), Magical Memory (Stewards' Cup), Strath Burn (Hackwood Stakes), Pearl Secret (Temple Stakes) and Waady (Coral Charge). After racing prominently from the start as Tiggy Wiggy set the pace, Twilight Son was sent to the front by Sweeney two furlong out. He repelled the challenge of Magical Memory and then held off the strong late run of Strath Burn to win by a short head and three-quarters of a length. After the race Sweeney said "I thought I had it, but I wanted to hear [the result of the photo-finish] called out first. He's done nothing but improve all year, he's an absolute star. He really wanted to win and full credit to Mr Candy." Henry Candy, commenting on his decision to move the horse up to the highest class said "I thought I might look incredibly stupid, but Fergus was very complimentary about the horse, he said he couldn't believe the ease in which he took him into the race. He's incredibly tough. He's a natural, he's kept on improving. He's twice the size he was a year ago and is a magnificent specimen. He was a baby for a long time. He just needed time".

The British Champions Sprint Stakes at Ascot Racecourse on 17 October saw Twilight Son, now undefeated in five races, matched against the season's leading sprinter Muhaarar and start the 4/1 second favourite in a 20-runner field. Ridden by Ryan Moore he was no match for Muhaarar but proved the clear second best on the day, finishing two lengths behind the winner but one and a half lengths in front of the third placed Danzeno.

=== 2016: four-year-old season ===
Twilight Son began his third season in the Duke of York Stakes at York Racecourse on 11 May in which he carried a weight of 139 pounds. He was restrained by Sweeney in the early stages before staying on in the last quarter mile and finishing fifth of the twelve runners behind Magical Memory. At Royal Ascot in June Twilight Son started 7/2 third favourite behind Magical Memory and The Tin Man (Leisure Stakes) in a nine-runner field for the Group One Diamond Jubilee Stakes. The other runners included Gold-Fun from Hong Kong, Signs of Blessing (Goldene Peitsche) from France, Undrafted (winner of the race in 2015) from the United States and Holler (Canterbury Stakes) from Australia. Ridden by Ryan Moore, Twilight Son raced just behind the leaders Signs of Blessing and Holler before making a forward move approaching the final furlong. He overtook the French horse fifty yards from the finish and held off the fast-finishing Gold-Fun to win by a neck. Signs of Blessing was a short head away in third with Magical Memory and Suedois just behind in fourth and fifth. Candy, who was winning for the first time at the Royal Ascot meeting since taking the Royal Hunt Cup with Pipedreamer in 1979 said "He's a strong character, this one. He has a mind of his own, and after his run at York I realised he needed a lot of work and so I have been quite hard on him. That showed today – he definitely stayed on well enough at the finish!" Ryan Moore commented "I always felt that, when I was going to ask him, he was going to win. He travelled very strongly and the pace wasn't strong enough for him. It would have been better if they'd gone quicker. He's a very good colt and is getting more confident".

Twilight Son failed to reproduce his best form in his two remaining races. In the July Cup at Newmarket he was in contention approaching the final furlong but faded badly in the closing stages and finished fourteenth of the eighteen runners behind his stablemate Limato. On 15 October he ran for the second time in the British Champions Sprint Stakes and started second favourite but ran poorly and finished unplaced behind The Tin Man.

On 25 October 2016, it was announced that Twilight Son had been retired from racing to stand as a breeding stallion at Cheveley Park. Henry Candy commented "Twilight Son was a pleasure to train. He was a very relaxed horse. He never took a lame step and never left an oat."

== Assessment ==
In the 2015 edition of the World's Best Racehorse Rankings Twilight Son was given a rating of 117, making him the 97th best racehorse in the world, the seventeenth-best horse trained in Britain and the third-best three-year-old sprinter behind Muhaarar and Runhappy. In the 2016 World's Best Racehorse Rankings he was rated on 115, making him the 218th best racehorse in the world and the 30th best horse trained in Britain.

== Stud record ==
Twilight Son began his career as a breeding stallion at the Cheveley Park Stud in 2017 at a covering fee of £10,000.

== Pedigree ==
Pedigree of Twilight Son (GB), bay stallion, 2012
Sire Kyllachy (GB) 1998	Pivotal (GB); 1993	Polar Falcon	Nureyev
Sire Kyllachy (GB) 1998	Pivotal (GB); 1993	Polar Falcon	Marie d'Argonne
Sire Kyllachy (GB) 1998	Pivotal (GB); 1993	Fearless Revival	Cozzene
Sire Kyllachy (GB) 1998	Pivotal (GB); 1993	Fearless Revival	Stufida
Sire Kyllachy (GB) 1998	Pretty Poppy (GB); 1988	Song	Sing Sing
Sire Kyllachy (GB) 1998	Pretty Poppy (GB); 1988	Song	Intent
Sire Kyllachy (GB) 1998	Pretty Poppy (GB); 1988	Moonlight Serenade	Crooner
Sire Kyllachy (GB) 1998	Pretty Poppy (GB); 1988	Moonlight Serenade	March Moonlight
Dam Twilight Mistress (GB) 1998	Bin Ajwaad (IRE); 1990	Rainbow Quest	Blushing Groom
Dam Twilight Mistress (GB) 1998	Bin Ajwaad (IRE); 1990	Rainbow Quest	I Will Follow
Dam Twilight Mistress (GB) 1998	Bin Ajwaad (IRE); 1990	Salidar	Sallust
Dam Twilight Mistress (GB) 1998	Bin Ajwaad (IRE); 1990	Salidar	Balidaress
Dam Twilight Mistress (GB) 1998	By Candlelight (IRE); 1991	Roi Danzig	Danzig
Dam Twilight Mistress (GB) 1998	By Candlelight (IRE); 1991	Roi Danzig	Gdynia
Dam Twilight Mistress (GB) 1998	By Candlelight (IRE); 1991	Penny Candle	Be My Guest
Dam Twilight Mistress (GB) 1998	By Candlelight (IRE); 1991	Penny Candle	Pennyweight (Family 6-e)
