= Palace House Stakes =

Flat horse race in Britain

- Class: Group 3
- Location: Rowley Mile; Newmarket, England
- Inaugurated: 1961
- Race type: Flat / Thoroughbred
- Sponsor: Hong Kong Jockey Club
- Website: Newmarket

Race information
- Distance: 5f (1,006 metres)
- Surface: Turf
- Track: Straight
- Qualification: Three-years-old and up
- Weight: 9 st 0 lb (3yo); 9 st 9 lb (4yo+); Allowances; 3 lb for fillies and mares Penalties; 7 lb for Group 1 winners * 5 lb for Group 2 winners * 3 lb for Group 3 winners * * since 31 August last year
- Purse: £85,000 (2025); 1st: £48,204

Palace House Stakes
2026
| Night Raider | Rumstar | Shagraan |

Previous years
2025
Rumstar | She's Quality | Clarendon House
2024
Seven Questions | Vadream | Beautiful Diamond
2023
Vadream | Live In The Dream | Manaccan
2022
Khaadem | Existent | Saint Lawrence
2021
Lazuli | Came From The Dark | Emaraaty Ana

2020-2011
2020
Far Above | Judicial | Major Jumbo
2019
Mabs Cross | Equilateral | Major Jumbo
2018
Mabs Cross | Judicial | Alpha Delphini
2017
Marsha | Washington Dc | Goldream
2016
Profitable | Jungle Cat | Waady
2015
Goldream | Justice Day | Kingsgate Native
2014
Sole Power | Kingsgate Native | Hot Streak
2013
Sole Power | Kingsgate Native | Tangerine Trees
2012
Mayson | Definightly | Elusivity
2011
Tangerine Trees | Rain Delayed | Jonny Mudball

2010-2001
2010
Equiano | Borderlescott | Blue Jack
2009
Amour Propre | Hoh Hoh Hoh | Borderlescott
2008
Captain Gerrard | Sakhee's Secret | Enticing
2007
Tax Free | Peace Offering | Bond City
2006
Dandy Man | Pivotal Flame | Tax Free
2005
Avonbridge | Ashdown Express | Ringmoor Down
2004
Frizzante | Avonbridge | Boogie Street
2003
Needwood Blade | Bahamian Pirate | Smokin Beau
2002
Kyllachy | Smokin Beau | Bahamian Pirate
2001
Rushcutter Bay | Cassandra Go | Now Look Here

2000-1991
2000
Pipalong | Kier Park | Rambling Bear
1999
Rambling Bear | Red Prairie | Cortachy Castle
1998
Yorkies Boy | My Best Valentine | Easycall
1997
Deep Finesse | Hever Golf Rose | Clever Caption
1996
Cool Jazz | Lucky Lionel | Westcourt Magic
1995
Mind Games | Eveningperformance | Owington
1994
Lochsong | Tropical | Bunty Boo
1993
Paris House | Dauberval | Lochsong
1992
Monde Bleu | Paris House | Blyton Lad
1991
Elbio | Sir Harry Hardman | Furajet

1990-1988
1990
Statoblest | Boozy | Blyton Lad
1989
Silver Fling | Superpower | Access Travel
1988
Perion | Blues Indigo | Chilibang

The Palace House Stakes is a Group 3 flat horse race in Great Britain open to horses aged three years or older. It is run over a distance of 5 furlongs (1,006 metres) on the Rowley Mile at Newmarket in late April or early May.

== History ==
The event is named after Palace House, a famous building in Newmarket on the site of a royal residence of King Charles II.

The race was established in 1961, and the first running was won by Galivanter. It was given Group 3 status when the present grading system was introduced in 1971.

The Palace House Stakes is currently held on the second day of Newmarket's Guineas Festival meeting. It is run on the same day as the 2000 Guineas.

== Records ==
Most successful horse (2 wins):

- Sole Power – 2013, 2014
- Mabs Cross - 2018, 2019

Leading jockey (2 wins):

- Ron Hutchinson – Ruby Laser (1964), Tamino (1966)
- Lester Piggott – Communication (1971), Valeriga (1980)
- Yves Saint-Martin – Raga Navarro (1977), Standaan (1981)
- Greville Starkey – Vaigly Great (1979), Hallgate (1987)
- Steve Cauthen – Lightning Label (1982), Elbio (1991)
- Frankie Dettori – Statoblest (1990), Lochsong (1994)
- John Carroll – Paris House (1993), Mind Games (1995)
- Michael Kinane – Cool Jazz (1996), Rushcutter Bay (2001)
- Michael Roberts – Deep Finesse (1997), Yorkies Boy (1998)
- Tom Eaves – Captain Gerrard (2008), Tangerine Trees (2011)
- Paul Mulrennan - Mabs Cross (2018, 2019)
- William Buick - Lazuli (2021), Khaadem (2022)

Leading trainer (2 wins):

- Dick Hern – Galivanter (1961), Crisper (1962)
- Doug Marks – Shiny Tenth (1972), Singing Bede (1974)
- Luca Cumani – Valeriga (1980), Statoblest (1990)
- Bill O'Gorman – On Stage (1983), Reesh (1984)
- Ian Balding – Silver Fling (1989), Lochsong (1994)
- Jack Berry – Paris House (1993), Mind Games (1995)
- Bryan McMahon – Yorkies Boy (1998), Needwood Blade (2003)
- Henry Candy – Kyllachy (2002), Amour Propre (2009)
- Bryan Smart – Captain Gerrard (2008), Tangerine Trees (2011)
- Edward Lynam – Sole Power (2013, 2014)
- Michael Dods - Mabs Cross (2018, 2019)

== Winners ==
| Year | Winner | Age | Jockey | Trainer | Time |
|---|---|---|---|---|---|
| 1961 | Gallivanter | 5 | Bobby Elliott | Dick Hern | 1:01.28 |
| 1962 | Crisper | 4 | Harry Carr | Dick Hern | 0:59.98 |
| 1963 | Sammy Davis | 3 | Doug Smith | Geoffrey Brooke | 1:02.82 |
| 1964 | Ruby Laser | 3 | Ron Hutchinson | Gordon Smyth | 0:59.28 |
| 1965 | Runnymede | 4 | Duncan Keith | Bill Wightman | 1:04.68 |
| 1966 | Tamino | 4 | Ron Hutchinson | John Dunlop | 1:01.16 |
| 1967 | Heavenly Sound | 3 | Sandy Barclay | Tom Waugh | 1:00.94 |
| 1968 | Mountain Call | 3 | Russ Maddock | Bernard van Cutsem | 1:00.76 |
| 1969 | Be Friendly | 5 | Geoff Lewis | Cyril Mitchell | 1:02.94 |
| 1970 | Tower Walk | 4 | Frankie Durr | Geoffrey Barling | 1:02.13 |
| 1971 | Communication | 3 | Lester Piggott | Bill Marshall | 1:01.60 |
| 1972 | Shiny Tenth | 5 | Joe Mercer | Doug Marks | 1:01.93 |
| 1973 | Brave Lad | 3 | Bill Williamson | Paul Davey | 1:02.53 |
| 1974 | Singing Bede | 5 | Geoff Baxter | Doug Marks | 1:00.40 |
| 1975 | Hot Spark | 3 | Johnny Roe | Dermot Weld | 1:02.19 |
| 1976 | Polly Peachum | 5 | Eddie Hide | Mick Easterby | 0:59.83 |
| 1977 | Raga Navarro | 5 | Yves Saint-Martin | M Vilber | 1:00.30 |
| 1978 | Frimley Park | 4 | Bob Curant | P Arthur | 1:05.29 |
| 1979 | Vaigly Great | 4 | Greville Starkey | Michael Stoute | 1:01.58 |
| 1980 | Valeriga | 4 | Lester Piggott | Luca Cumani | 1:00.99 |
| 1981 | Standaan | 5 | Yves Saint-Martin | C. Austin | 1:00.73 |
| 1982 | Lightning Label | 6 | Steve Cauthen | Paul Kelleway | 0:59.40 |
| 1983 | On Stage | 3 | Willie Carson | Bill O'Gorman | 1:02.98 |
| 1984 | Reesh | 3 | Taffy Thomas | Bill O'Gorman | 1:00.29 |
| 1985 | Prince Sabo | 3 | John Reid | Mrs S. Swift | 0:59.40 |
| 1986 | Double Schwartz | 5 | Brent Thomson | Charlie Nelson | 0:59.04 |
| 1987 | Hallgate | 4 | Greville Starkey | Alan Bailey | 0:58.90 |
| 1988 | Perion | 6 | Paul Eddery | Geoff Lewis | 1:00.72 |
| 1989 | Silver Fling | 4 | John Matthias | Ian Balding | 0:58.27 |
| 1990 | Statoblest | 4 | Frankie Dettori | Luca Cumani | 0:58.84 |
| 1991 | Elbio | 4 | Steve Cauthen | Peter Makin | 0:59.54 |
| 1992 | Monde Bleu | 4 | Thierry Jarnet | André Fabre | 0:59.44 |
| 1993 | Paris House | 4 | John Carroll | Jack Berry | 0:58.75 |
| 1994 | Lochsong | 6 | Frankie Dettori | Ian Balding | 0:56.81 |
| 1995 | Mind Games | 3 | John Carroll | Jack Berry | 0:58.15 |
| 1996 | Cool Jazz | 5 | Michael Kinane | Clive Brittain | 0:59.70 |
| 1997 | Deep Finesse | 3 | Michael Roberts | Michael Jarvis | 0:58.69 |
| 1998 | Yorkies Boy | 3 | Michael Roberts | Bryan McMahon | 1:00.98 |
| 1999 (Note: The 1999 running took place on Newmarket's July Course) | Rambling Bear | 6 | Richard Quinn | Michael Blanshard | 0:57.32 |
| 2000 | Pipalong | 4 | Kevin Darley | Tim Easterby | 0:59.50 |
| 2001 | Rushcutter Bay | 8 | Michael Kinane | Pat Gilligan | 0:58.99 |
| 2002 | Kyllachy | 4 | Jamie Spencer | Henry Candy | 0:58.53 |
| 2003 | Needwood Blade | 5 | Seb Sanders | Bryan McMahon | 0:59.13 |
| 2004 | Frizzante | 5 | Johnny Murtagh | James Fanshawe | 0:59.24 |
| 2005 | Avonbridge | 5 | Steve Drowne | Roger Charlton | 0:58.23 |
| 2006 | Dandy Man | 3 | Niall McCullagh | Con Collins | 0:58.41 |
| 2007 | Tax Free | 5 | Adrian Nicholls | David Nicholls | 0:58.29 |
| 2008 | Captain Gerrard | 3 | Tom Eaves | Bryan Smart | 0:59.00 |
| 2009 | Amour Propre | 3 | Dane O'Neill | Henry Candy | 0:57.73 |
| 2010 | Equiano | 5 | Michael Hills | Barry Hills | 0:58.40 |
| 2011 | Tangerine Trees | 6 | Tom Eaves | Bryan Smart | 0:59.70 |
| 2012 | Mayson | 4 | Paul Hanagan | Richard Fahey | 1:01.42 |
| 2013 | Sole Power | 6 | Johnny Murtagh | Edward Lynam | 0:57.02 |
| 2014 | Sole Power | 7 | Ryan Moore | Edward Lynam | 0:58.74 |
| 2015 | Goldream | 6 | Martin Harley | Robert Cowell | 0:58.72 |
| 2016 | Profitable | 4 | Adam Kirby | Clive Cox | 0:58.59 |
| 2017 | Marsha | 4 | Luke Morris | Mark Prescott | 0:58.18 |
| 2018 | Mabs Cross | 4 | Paul Mulrennan | Michael Dods | 0:58.44 |
| 2019 | Mabs Cross | 5 | Paul Mulrennan | Michael Dods | 0:58.67 |
| 2020 (Note: The 2020 race was run in June, due to the COVID-19 pandemic in the United Kingdom) | Far Above | 4 | P. J. McDonald | James Tate | 0:58.07 |
| 2021 | Lazuli | 4 | William Buick | Charlie Appleby | 0:58.59 |
| 2022 | Khaadem | 6 | William Buick | Charles Hills | 0:58.53 |
| 2023 | Vadream | 5 | Kieran Shoemark | Charlie Fellowes | 1:00.42 |
| 2024 | Seven Questions | 3 | Callum Shepherd | George Scott | 0:58.88 |
| 2025 | Rumstar | 5 | Rob Hornby | Jonathan Portman | 0:57.72 |
| 2026 | Night Raider | 5 | James Doyle | Karl Burke | 0:57.86 |

== See also ==
- Horse racing in Great Britain
- List of British flat horse races
