= Al Quoz Sprint =

- Class: Group 1
- Location: Meydan Racecourse; Dubai, United Arab Emirates
- Inaugurated: 2007
- Race type: Thoroughbred – Flat racing
- Website: Dubai World Cup

Race information
- Distance: 1,200 metres (abt 6 furlongs)
- Surface: Turf
- Track: straight
- Qualification: 3yo+
- Weight: NH 3yo: 54.5kg. SH 3yo: 58kg. NH & SH 4yo+: 58.5kg
- Purse: US$1 million

Al Quoz Sprint is a thoroughbred horse race held in Meydan Racecourse, Dubai, United Arab Emirates. It was first run in 2007 as part of the then, Dubai International Racing Carnival and subsequently moved to Dubai World Cup night in 2010 to coincide with the opening of Meydan Racecourse. In 2009, it became a Group 3 and is now run at Group 1 level.

Initially run over 1200m, in 2011, the race was shortened to a 1000-metre (5 furlongs) sprint. In 2017 the race reverted to 1200 metres (6 furlongs).

== Records ==
Speed record: (at distance of 1,000 metres)

- 56.21 – Amber Sky (2014), at distance of 1,000 metres
- 1:07.50 – California Spangle (2024), at distance of 1,200 metres

Most wins by a horse (2):

- J J the Jet Plane (2009, 2011)

Most wins by a jockey (2):

- William Buick (2019, 2025)

Most wins by a trainer (2):

- Mike De Kock (2009, 2013)
- Charlie Appleby (2018, 2019)

Most wins by an owner (2):

- H Du Preez, C Strydom, L Houdalakis, C Boyens (2009, 2011)
- Godolphin (2018, 2019)

== Winners ==
Year	Winner	Age	Jockey	Trainer	Owner	Time
2007	Great Britain	5	Frankie Dettori	Saeed bin Suroor	Darley	1:12.16
2008 (Div II)	Mutamarres	5	Richard Hills	Doug Watson	Hamdan Al Maktoum	1:12.81
2008 (Div I)	Instant Recall	7	Wayne Smith	Musabah Al Muhairi	Rashid bin Humaid Al Nuaimi	1:13.09
2009	J J The Jet Plane	4	Kevin Shea	Mike de Kock	H Du Preez et al.	1:11.72
2010	Joy And Fun	6	Brett Doyle	Derek Cruz	Mr & Mrs Wong Chun Nam	1:09.80
2011	J J The Jet Plane	6	Bernard Fayd'Herbe	Lucky Houdalakis	H Du Preez et al.	0:59.40
2012	Ortensia	7	Craig Williams	Paul Messara	Alister & Annie Fraser/Ridley	0:57.98
2013	Shea Shea	6	Christophe Soumillon	Mike de Kock	Brian Joffe & Myron C Berzack	0:56.41
2014	Amber Sky	4	João Moreira	Ricky Yiu Poon-fai	Sammo Hung	0:56.21
2015	Sole Power	8	Richard Hughes	Edward Lynam	Sabena Power	0:57.24
2016	Buffering	8	Damian Browne	Robert Heathcote	V Heathcote, S Krslovic et al.	0:56.34
2017	The Right Man	5	François-Xavier Bertras	Didier Guillemin	Pegase Bloodstock	1:09.59
2018	Jungle Cat	6	James Doyle	Charlie Appleby	Godolphin	1:09.37
2019	Blue Point	5	William Buick	Charlie Appleby	Godolphin	1:08.39
2020	Cancelled due to the COVID-19 pandemic.					
2021	Extravagant Kid	8	Ryan Moore	Brendan Walsh	DARRS Inc	1:09.26
2022	A Case Of You	4	Ronan Whelan	Adrian McGuinness	Gary Devlin	1:08.81
2023	Danyah	6	Dane O'Neill	Musabbeh Al Mheiri	Shadwell Estate	1:08.81
2024	California Spangle	6	Brenton Avdulla	Tony Cruz	The Executors of the Estate of the late Howard Liang Yum Shing	1:07.50
2025	Believing	5	William Buick	George Boughey	Mrs J Magnier, M Tabor, D Smith & Resolute	1:07.77
2026	Native Approach	5	Connor Beasly	Ahmad Bin Harmash	Hamdan Harmash	1:10.02

== See also ==
- List of United Arab Emirates horse races
