= Sole Power =

British-bred Thoroughbred racehorse

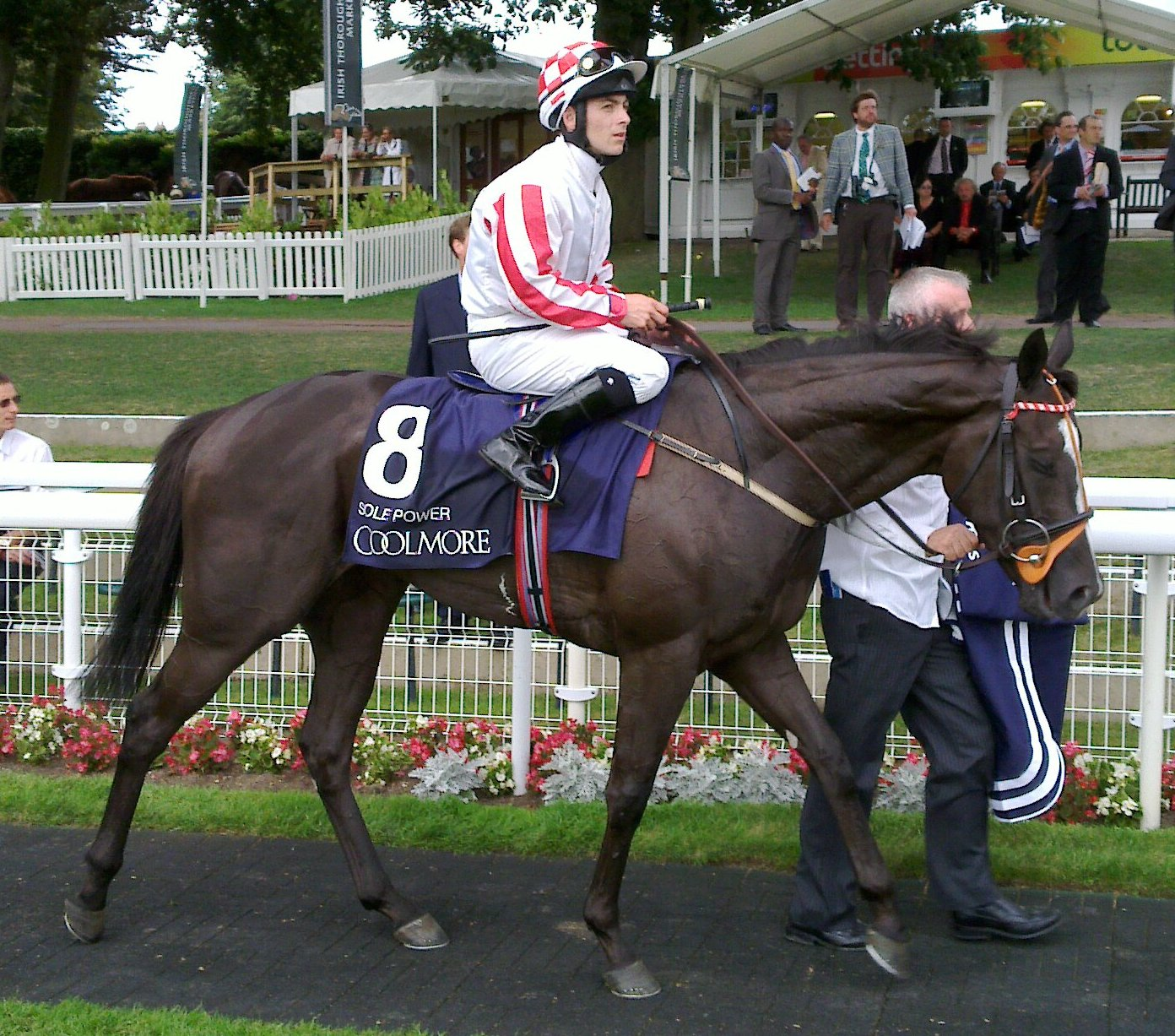
- Wayne Lordan on Sole Power after winning the 2010 Nunthorpe Stakes
- Sire: Kyllachy
- Grandsire: Pivotal
- Dam: Demerger
- Damsire: Distant View
- Sex: Gelding
- Foaled: 18 March 2007
- Country: United Kingdom
- Colour: Bay
- Breeder: G Russell
- Owner: Sabena Power
- Trainer: Edward Lynam
- Record: 65:12–7–7
- Earnings: £2,089,058

Major wins
- Nunthorpe Stakes (2010, 2014); Temple Stakes (2012); Scarbrough Stakes (2012); Palace House Stakes (2013, 2014); King's Stand Stakes (2013, 2014); Al Quoz Sprint (2015); Flying Five (2015)

Awards
- Cartier Champion Sprinter (2014); Irish Horse of the Year (2014)

Sole Power (foaled 18 March 2007) is a British-bred, Irish-trained Thoroughbred racehorse. A specialist sprinter, he won twelve of his sixty-five races and competed in five different countries in a nine-year racing career. He is unique in being a dual winner of both the King's Stand Stakes at Royal Ascot and the Nunthorpe Stakes at York. His racing style is distinctive: he is usually restrained by his jockey for most of the race before producing a single burst of acceleration in the closing stages.

He won one minor race as a two-year-old but after winning on his debut as a three-year-old he was unplaced in his next four races before recording a 100/1 upset victory in the 2010 Nunthorpe Stakes. He did not race again that year, but returned as a four-year-old to win the Temple Stakes and finish third in the Prix de l'Abbaye. In 2012 he recorded his only success in the Listed Scarbrough Stakes but was placed in the Al Quoz Sprint, Temple Stakes and King's Stand Stakes.

As a six-year-old in 2013, the gelding won the Palace House Stakes and the King's Stand Stakes, finished third in the Nunthorpe and second to the Japanese horse Lord Kanaloa in the Hong Kong Sprint. In 2014 Sole Power was unbeaten in his first three starts, recording repeat wins in the Palace House Stakes, King's Stand Stakes and Nunthorpe Stakes. At the end of 2014 he was named Cartier Champion Sprinter and Irish Horse of the Year.

== Background ==
Sole Power is a small bay gelding with a white blaze bred in England by G. Russell. He was sired by Kyllachy, a top-class sprinter who won the Nunthorpe Stakes in 2002. At stud Kyllachy has sired many successful horses including Twilight Son, the Dubai Golden Shaheen winner Krypton Factor and the Chairman's Sprint Prize winner Dim Sum. Sole Power's dam was the unraced, Kentucky-bred mare Demerger, a daughter of the Sussex Stakes winner Distant View.

In August 2008 the yearling colt was consigned by the Wiltshire-based Hillwood Stud to the sales at Doncaster where he was bought for £32,000 by the Irish trainer Edward Lynam. The horse then passed into the ownership of David and Sabena Power (members of the Power bookmaking family) and was sent into training with Lynam at Dunshaughlin, County Meath.

== Racing career ==
=== 2009: two-year-old season ===
Sole Power ran six times as a juvenile in 2009, ridden on each occasion by Pat Smullen. After finishing third in a maiden race at the Curragh Racecourse on his debut in June he finished second in a Listed Race at the same course a month later. He was then sent to York Racecourse in England, where he finished third in a valuable "sales race" restricted to horses who had been sold at Doncaster. In Autumn he finished unplaced in the Group Three Cornwallis Stakes at Ascot Racecourse before returning to Ireland for two races on the synthetic track at Dundalk Racecourse in November. He recorded his first success when winning a fourteen-runner maiden race at odds of 4/7, and then finished fourth when odds on favourite for a race over six furlongs. At the end of the season, the colt was gelded on the advice of his trainer.

=== 2010: three-year-old season ===
Sole Power began his three-year-old season by carrying 124 pounds to victory against older horses in a five furlong handicap race at Dundalk in April in a track record time of 57.46 seconds. He failed to reach the first three places in his next four starts: he finished fourth to Equiano in the Palace House Stakes at Newmarket, fifth in a Listed race at Naas, sixth in the Sapphire Stakes at the Curragh, and fifth in the Listed Abergwaun Stakes at Tipperary. On 20 August he was one of twelve sprinters to contest the Nunthorpe Stakes over five furlongs at York. Ridden by Wayne Lordan, he was given little chance and started at odds of 100/1. Lordan restrained the horse in the early stages before making headway in the last quarter mile. He took the lead 75 yards from the finish and won by one and a quarter lengths from the 6/4 favourite Starspangledbanner with another 100/1 outsider, Piccadilly Lily in third. After the race, David Power admitted that he did not expect the horse to finish better than "mid-division", whilst Lynam described the winner as "very, very fast" and "very honest but just, like his trainer, a bit mentally immature."

Sole Power was aimed at the Prix de l'Abbaye at Longchamp Racecourse in October, but was withdrawn from the race on account of the soft ground and did not race again in 2010. Lynam explained: "I'm disappointed to have to take him out, but it was not unexpected. There was a 50-50 chance of a good-ground Abbaye and it obviously wasn't our year. He's coming home from England tonight and will go on his holidays. Maybe he'll get to Longchamp next year."

=== 2011: four-year-old season ===
On his first appearance since his Nunthorpe win, Sole Power was sent to the United Arab Emirates in March 2010 where he finished fourteenth of the sixteen runners behind the South African gelding J J the Jet Plane in the Al Quoz Sprint at Meydan Racecourse. In April he dead-heated for third place in the Palace House Stakes and then travelled to Haydock Park Racecourse for the Temple Stakes three weeks later. The race attracted a great deal of attention as it featured the British debut of the Hungarian sprinter Overdose. Ridden by Keagan Latham, he took the lead a furlong from the finish and held the challenge of Kingsgate Native to win by three quarters of a length, with Overdose unplaced. Lynam expressed his satisfaction at having "proved a few doubters wrong."

Sole Power failed to win in six subsequent races in 2011. He finished unplaced in his first attempt at the King's Stand Stakes, fifth when favourite for the Abergwaun Stakes, second in the Flying Five at the Curragh and twelfth when attempting six furlongs in the Haydock Sprint Cup. His best effort came in the Prix de l'Abbaye at Longchamp in October. Latham found himself trapped on the inside and had to switch sharply to the right to obtain a clear run. Sole Power finished strongly and looked unlucky to be beaten in a three-way photo-finish by the British horses Tangerine Trees and Secret Asset. In December, Sole Power was sent to contest the Hong Kong Sprint at Sha Tin Racecourse where he finished ninth of the fourteen runners behind Lucky Nine.

=== 2012: five-year-old season ===
As in 2012, Sole Power began his season at Meydan, but on this occasion he contested a prep race before tackling the Al Quoz Sprint, finishing second to the Irish-trained mare Invincible Ash in the Meydan Sprint on 10 March. Three weeks later he started 11/2 favourite for the Al Quoz sprint in which he finished second to the Australian mare Ortensia. On his return to Europe he finished second for the third time in succession when he was runner up to Bated Breath in the Temple Stakes after having to be repeatedly switched to obtain a clear run.

In June he was again sent to Royal Ascot for the King's Stand Stakes in which he finished third of the twenty-two runners behind the Hong Kong-trained gelding Little Bridge. In August he ran in his second Nunthorpe Stakes, but after making good progress approaching the final quarter mile he faded in the closing stages to finish seventh behind Ortensia. After losing eleven races in succession, Sole Power was dropped in class for the Listed Scarbrough Stakes at Doncaster Racecourse in September. Ridden by Johnny Murtagh he started the 5/2 favourite and won "very readily" from eleven opponents. On his final appearance of the season he finished fifth behind the French-trained filly Wizz Kid in the Prix de l'Abbaye.

=== 2013: six-year-old season ===
Sole Power returned to Meydan in early 2013 where he finished second to the South African sprinter Shea Shea in the Meydan Sprint and fourth to the same horse in the Al Quoz Sprint. On his return to Europe the gelding ran for the third time in the Palace House Stakes at Newmarket. Ridden by Murtagh, he was restrained in the early stages before taking the lead inside the final furlong to win by a length from Kingsgate Native, with Tangerine Trees in third. It was the horse's first win at Group level for almost two years. After the race, Lynam paid tribute to the winner, saying: "He has brought us all over the world, gives 110 per cent every time. He wants fast ground, five furlongs and when he gets it with a bit of luck in running he is very good." Sole Power started the 11/10 favourite for the Temple Stakes at Haydock on 25 May, but after briefly leading the field he finished fourth behind Kingsgate Native, Swiss Spirit and Reckless Abandon.

On 18 June, Sole Power started at odds of 8/1 for the King's Stand Stakes in a field which included Shea Shea, Kingsgate Native, Reckless Abandon and Swiss Spirit as well as the Newmarket Handicap winner Shamexpress from Australia. Murtagh held the gelding up towards the back of the field, before switching left to race up the stand-side rail inside the final furlong. In the closing strides, Sole Power overhauled Shea Shea, who was racing down the centre of the track, and won the Group One prize by a neck. After the race Murtagh, who was recording his fortieth Royal Ascot win, said of Sole Power: "He's got a great turn of foot if you can just conserve his energy. He's very willing and if he gets going too early he runs out of steam. You've got to time it to the best." Several months after the race, a video clip was posted on YouTube which purported to show Murtagh passing an object to the trainer's wife Sarah Lynam, in the unsaddling enclosure. Comments posted online suggested that the object might have been an electrical "buzzer", a device used to shock a horse into running more quickly. Following an investigation by the British Horseracing Authority, both Murtagh and Lynam were exonerated of any wrongdoing.

In July, Sole Power had his first outing over six furlongs since 2011 when he started at odds of 15/2 for the July Cup at Newmarket. He was drawn on the far left of the eleven runner field and when the starting stalls opened Murtagh held the horse back, before tracking sharply to the right to race along the rails. He made progress approaching the final furlong, but never reached the leaders and finished fifth behind Lethal Force, Society Rock, Slade Power and Shea Shea. Sole Power returned to five furlongs for his third attempt at the Nunthorpe Stakes in August and started the 4/1 second favourite in a field of seventeen. He was restrained at the rear of the field before finishing strongly to take third place, beaten half a length and a nose by the 40/1 outsider Jwala and Shea Shea. After the race Lynam commented "The ground beat him but we kind of knew beforehand it would. It has happened the last few times at York, we just haven't had fast ground here for a few years. He ran well and I am proud of him."

Sole Power was campaigned internationally in the autumn. On 6 October he ran for the third time in the Prix de l'Abbaye and started at odds of 9/1 in a field of 20 runners. He made some progress in the second half of the race but never reached the leaders finishing sixth behind Maarek, another Irish-trained six-year-old. Sole Power ended his season in the Hong Kong Sprint on 8 December. He was held up in the early stages before making steady progress in the straight to finish second, five lengths behind the Japanese champion Lord Kanaloa.

=== 2014: seven-year-old season ===
For the fourth time, Sole Power was sent to Dubai in spring to race at Meydan, but had little success, finishing fourth to Shea Shea in the Meydan Sprint and seventh behind the Hong Kong-trained Amber Sky in the Al Quoz Sprint. On 3 May started 9/4 favourite as he attempted to repeat his 2013 success in the Palace House Stakes. Ridden by Ryan Moore, he had trouble obtaining a clear run approaching the final furlong but when switched right he accelerated to take the lead fifty yards from the finish and won by half a length from Kingsgate Native.

When the gelding returned to Royal Ascot on 17 June he started 5/1 third favourite for the King's Stand Stakes, with the three-year-old Hot Streak, winner of the Temple Stakes, heading the betting from Shea Shea. Richard Hughes became the eighth jockey to partner Sole Power, but the tactics were familiar as the horse was held up before being switched to the outside for a late challenge. The seven-year-old quickened well, took the lead 75 yards from the finish and won by one and a quarter lengths from the 50/1 outsider Stepper Point, with Hot Streak a neck away in third. He became the first horse to win consecutive runnings of the race since Gold Bridge in 1934. After the race, Lynam said "He was the best horse in the race, experience has won him it. This horse has been lucky because he's never had a well-known trainer but he's always had a top-class jockey". Hughes paid tribute to the horse's acceleration, saying "I must have been eight lengths off the leader at halfway. There was loads of room and he just likes to explode". The gelding missed a run in the July Cup after contracting a skin infection described by Lynam as "like ring worm or dermatitis".

On 22 August, Sole Power contested the Nunthorpe Stakes for the fourth time in five years and started the 11/4 favourite in a field of thirteen runners. Shea Shea, Stepper Point and Hot Streak where again among his opponents, along with the King George Stakes winners Moviesta and Take Cover, the Middle Park Stakes winner Astaire and the leading French sprinter Rangali (Prix du Gros Chêne). Hughes employed the usual tactics, but when he attempted to challenge on the stands side (the right side from the jockeys' viewpoint) he found his path blocked and had to switch sharply to the left. Now racing towards the centre of the course, Sole Power again looked likely to be deprived of a clear run in the last hundred yards but squeezed through a gap and gained the advantage in the final strides to win by half a length from Stepper Point. Hughes commented "he's brilliant, he's made for me. When I was 14 or 15 I dreamed of riding horses like this and doing it like that". Explaining the horse's limited 2014 campaign up to that point, Lynam said "we couldn’t train him because of his skin problem, so to come back and do that means he's a very special horse. He's the horse of a lifetime and there's something special about him." Sole Power moved up to six furlongs for the Sprint Cup at Haydock in September and started the 5/2 favourite, but after failing to obtain a clear run a furlong out, he finished fourth behind the three-year-old G-Force.

On 5 October, Sole Power made his fourth attempt to win the Prix de l'Abbaye and started favourite against seventeen opponents. He travelled well but Hughes was unable to obtain a clear run and finished unplaced behind the British gelding Move In Time. He ended his season with another attempt at the Hong Kong Sprint but never looked likely to win and finished ninth of the fifteen runners behind the locally trained Aerovelocity who won by a neck from Peniaphobia.

=== 2015: eight-year-old season ===
For the fifth time, Sole Power was sent to Dubai in early spring. He started favourite for the Meydan Sprint but was unable to recover after failing to obtain a clear run in the straight and finished twelfth behind Sir Maximilian. On 28 March Sole Power made his fifth bid to win the Al Quoz Sprint for which his opponents included Amber Sky, Peniaphobia and Sir Maximilian, as well as Bundle of Joy from Hong Kong, Green Mask from the United States, Hototo from Bahrain, Caspar Netscher (Mill Reef Stakes, German 2,000 Guineas, Nearctic Stakes) and Stepper Point (Flying Five) from England and Farmah (Premio Carlo e Francesco Aloisi) from France. Sole Power started slowly but produced a strong late run to take the lead inside the final furlong and won by half a length from Peniaphobia, with Green Mask taking third ahead of Amber Sky. Hughes called the winner "a wonderful little horse. I thought he ran too lacklustre (on his last start at Meydan), but Eddie Lynam's done something and it's worked a treat" whilst Sabena Power said "I’m so thrilled. He surprises us all the time – he's fantastic". On his return to Europe, the gelding finished sixth in the Greenlands Stakes at the Curragh on 23 May.

At Royal Ascot, Sole Power attempted to win a third consecutive King's Stand Stakes. He started the 5/2 favourite but despite making progress in the last quarter mile he finished fifth of the eighteen runners behind Goldream. He went on to finish fourth behind Muhaarar in the July Cup and fourth again behind the filly Mecca's Angel in the Nunthorpe Stakes. On 13 September he was partnered by Chris Hayes in the Flying Five at the Curragh and started the 5/1 co-favourite alongside Moviesta and Maarek. He produced his customary late run to take the lead inside the final furlong and held off the late challenge of Maarek to win by a head.

Sole Power was retired in March 2017 at the age of ten. Lynam said "He was a great horse, but time waits for no man. I was a nobody until he came around and he's taken me to places I never felt were possible to go to."

== Assessment and honours ==
In the 2010 edition on the World's Best Racehorse Rankings Sole Power was given a rating of 117 making him the 126th best racehorse in the world and the equal-best three-year-old sprinter, alongside Smiling Tiger, Wanted and Let Me Fight. His rating dropped to 115 in the following year, and his ranking dropped to 248 in the world, and in 2012 he repeated his rating of 115, when he was rated 236th in the world. He was again rated on 115 in 2013. He improved to 118 in 2014, making him the equal 78th best horse in the world and the eighth best sprinter.

In November 2014 Sole Power was named Champion Sprinter at the Cartier Racing Awards, beating his stablemate Slade Power.

== Pedigree ==
Pedigree of Sole Power (GB), bay gelding, 2007
Sire Kyllachy (GB) 1998	Pivotal (GB); 1993	Polar Falcon	Nureyev
Sire Kyllachy (GB) 1998	Pivotal (GB); 1993	Polar Falcon	Marie d'Argonne
Sire Kyllachy (GB) 1998	Pivotal (GB); 1993	Fearless Revival	Cozzene
Sire Kyllachy (GB) 1998	Pivotal (GB); 1993	Fearless Revival	Stufida
Sire Kyllachy (GB) 1998	Pretty Poppy (GB); 1988	Song	Sing Sing
Sire Kyllachy (GB) 1998	Pretty Poppy (GB); 1988	Song	Intent
Sire Kyllachy (GB) 1998	Pretty Poppy (GB); 1988	Moonlight Serenade	Crooner
Sire Kyllachy (GB) 1998	Pretty Poppy (GB); 1988	Moonlight Serenade	March Moonlight
Dam Demerger (USA) 1997	Distant View (USA); 1991	Mr. Prospector	Raise a Native
Dam Demerger (USA) 1997	Distant View (USA); 1991	Mr. Prospector	Gold Digger
Dam Demerger (USA) 1997	Distant View (USA); 1991	Seven Springs	Irish River
Dam Demerger (USA) 1997	Distant View (USA); 1991	Seven Springs	La Trinite
Dam Demerger (USA) 1997	Merida (GB); 1991	Warning	Known Fact
Dam Demerger (USA) 1997	Merida (GB); 1991	Warning	Slightly Dangerous
Dam Demerger (USA) 1997	Merida (GB); 1991	Metair	Laser Light
Dam Demerger (USA) 1997	Merida (GB); 1991	Metair	Treatisan (Family 1-p)
