= Muhaarar =

British-bred Thoroughbred racehorse

- Racing silks of Hamdan Al Maktoum
- Sire: Oasis Dream
- Grandsire: Green Desert
- Dam: Tahrir
- Damsire: Linamix
- Sex: Colt
- Foaled: 25 February 2012
- Country: United Kingdom
- Colour: Bay
- Breeder: Shadwell Stud
- Owner: Hamdan Al Maktoum
- Trainer: Charlie Hills
- Record: 11: 7-0-3
- Earnings: £1,212,401

Major wins
- Gimcrack Stakes (2014); Greenham Stakes (2015); Commonwealth Cup (2015); July Cup (2015); Prix Maurice de Gheest (2015); British Champions Sprint Stakes (2015)

Awards
- Cartier Champion Sprinter (2015)

Muhaarar (foaled 25 February 2012) is a British Thoroughbred racehorse. As a two-year-old he showed very good form, winning the Gimcrack Stakes and finishing third in both the July Stakes and the Middle Park Stakes. He began his three-year-old career with a win in the Greenham Stakes before emerging as a leading sprinter with victories in the Commonwealth Cup, July Cup, Prix Maurice de Gheest and British Champions Sprint Stakes.

== Background ==
Muhaarar is a bay horse with a white coronet on his right hind foot bred in the United Kingdom by his owner, Hamdan Al Maktoum's Shadwell Stud. He was sired by Oasis Dream, a sprinter who won the July Cup and the Nunthorpe Stakes in 2003 before becoming a very successful breeding stallion. His other progeny have included Midday and Power. Muhaarar's dam Tahrir won two races in Britain as a three-year-old in 2003. Tahrir was a descendant of the broodmare Triumphant, who was a half-sister to Relkino.

The colt was sent into training with Charles "Charlie" Hills at Lambourn in Berkshire. The name Muhaarar is Arabic for "liberated".

== Racing career ==
=== 2014: two-year-old season ===
Muhaarar made his racecourse debut in a maiden race over five and a half furlongs at Doncaster Racecourse on 12 May. Starting the 5/6 favourite, he took the lead approaching the final furlong and accelerated away from his opponents to win by four lengths from Red Connect. The colt was moved up in class to contest the Group Two July Stakes at Newmarket Racecourse on 10 July and finished third behind Ivawood and Jungle Cat with Belardo in fourth. Sixteen days later he started 2/1 joint favourite for the listed Winkfield Stakes over seven furlongs at Ascot Racecourse and finished third again, beaten 1 1/2 lengths and three quarters of a length by Kodi Bear and Disegno. On 23 August, Muhaarar, ridden by Paul Hanagan, started at odds of 7/1 for the Group Two Gimcrack Stakes over six furlongs at York. The Norfolk Stakes winner Baitha Alga started favourite ahead of Jungle Cat, Beacon (Dragon Stakes) and the Irish challenger Accepted. Hanagan tracked the leaders before moving up to challenge inside the final furlong. Muhaarar caught Jungle Cat in the final strides and won by a nose. Hills commented "He has always shown plenty and it is nice when it falls into place though. It never really worked last time and Paul has given him a lovely ride today. He is growing up and is in plenty of the top class races for the rest of the year." On his final appearance of the season, Muhaarar ran in the Group One Middle Park Stakes at Newmarket on 17 October. After leading for most of the way he was overtaken in the closing stages and finished third behind Charming Thought and Ivawood.

=== 2015: three-year-old season ===
==== Spring campaign ====
On his three-year-old debut, Muhaarar started a 16/1 outsider for the Greenham Stakes (a trial race for the 2000 Guineas) over seven furlongs at Newbury. Ivawood was made the favourite in a nine-runner field which also included Belardo (Dewhurst Stakes), Estidhkaar (Champagne Stakes) and Dick Whittington (Phoenix Stakes). With Hanagan opting to ride Estidhkaar, Muhaarar was ridden by the Italian-born veteran Frankie Dettori. After being bumped at the start, he settled in mid-division before making progress in the last quarter mile. He took the lead in the last hundred yards and won by a neck from Estidhkaar with the pair finishing 4 1/2 lengths clear of Ivawood in third. After the race Hills said "We always knew he was a good horse but there was always going to be a question mark about the trip....Frankie thinks the French Guineas would suit him well and it will be Sheikh Hamdan's decision. The 2,000 Guineas has to be on the agenda." The winning time of 1:20.80 was a new course record.

For his next race, Muhaarar was sent to France and moved up in distance for the Poule d'Essai des Poulains over 1600 metres at Longchamp Racecourse. After pulling hard in the early stages he made some progress in the straight without ever looking likely to win and finished eighth of the eighteen runners behind Make Believe.

==== Commonwealth Cup ====
Muhaarar was brought back to sprint distances for the inaugural running of the Commonwealth Cup, a race for three-year-olds over six furlongs at Royal Ascot on 19 June. The American-trained Hootenanny (Breeders' Cup Juvenile Turf) started favourite ahead of Limato (Pavilion Stakes) and Tiggy Wiggy whilst the other runners included Anthem Alexnder (Queen Mary Stakes), Adaay (Sandy Lane Stakes), Kool Kompany (Prix Robert Papin, Craven Stakes), Jungle Cat, New Providence (Dick Poole Fillies' Stakes), Home of the Brave (European Free Handicap) and Goken (Prix du Bois). Hanagan chose to ride Adaay and so the ride on Muhaarar went to Dane O'Neill.

O'Neill settled the colt in mid-division before moving up to challenge for the lead approaching the final furlong. Muhaarar accelerated clear of the field to win by 3 3/4 lengths from Limato with Anthem Alexander taking third ahead of the outsiders Salt Island and Profitable. Following the colt's victory, Hills said "This horse is improving and he's very versatile. He's got better with racing... He has got the world at his feet". O'Neill said "It was all very easy, it was a bit surreal. He didn't half pick up".

==== July Cup ====
On 10 July Muhaarar was matched against older sprinters for the first time in the July Cup at Newmarket. Anthem Alexander was again in opposition but his most serious challenge appeared to come from the Australian colt Brazen Beau the winner of the Newmarket Handicap. The other runners included the veteran Sole Power, G Force (Haydock Sprint Cup), Danzeno (Chipchase Stakes), Tropics (Bengough Stakes), Muthmir (Prix du Gros Chêne), Astaire (Middle Park Stakes) and Jack Dexter (Chipchase Stakes).

Starting 2/1 joint favourite with Brazen Beau and ridden by Hanagan he was settled behind the leaders before beginning to make progress in the last quarter mile. He produced a strong late run to catch the leader Tropics in the final stride and won by a nose, with the 50/1 outsider Eastern Impact taking third ahead of Sole Power and Danzeno. Hanagan commented "It was a bit too close for comfort, to be honest... He just didn’t handle the dip at all and the only time I could really give him his head was when he met the rising ground at the end. As soon as I let him go he really took off."

==== Prix Maurice de Gheest ====
Muhaarar was sent to France for his next race, the Prix Maurice de Gheest over 1300 metres at Deauville Racecourse on 9 August. Ridden again by Hanagan he started favourite ahead of the filly Esoterique who had won the Prix Rothschild and finished second to Solow in the Queen Anne Stakes. The other contenders included Ivawood (Richmond Stakes), Gordon Lord Byron (Haydock Sprint Cup, George Ryder Stakes), Son Cesio (Prix de Ris-Orangis), Fontenalice (Premio Dormello) and Coulsty (Prix de Meautry).

Muhaarar was among the leaders from the start before taking the lead 150 metres from the finish and won by half a length from Esoterique, with Gordon Lord Byron another half length away in third place. Commenting on the colt's future targets, Hills said "Obviously we need to see how he comes out of this, but whatever happens, looking further ahead I wouldn't mind having a crack at the Breeders' Cup Mile".

==== British Champions Sprint Stakes ====
On 17 October, Muhaarar started 5/2 favourite in a twenty-runner field for the British Champions Sprint Stakes over six furlongs at Ascot in which he was attempting to win a fourth consecutive Group One race. His main rival in the betting market was Twilight Son an undefeated colt who had won the Haydock Sprint Cup on his most recent start. Adaay, Gordon Lord Byron, Danzeno, Coulsty and Jack Dexter were again among his opponents along with Maarek (Prix de l'Abbaye), Strath Burn (Hackwood Stakes), Naadirr (Cammidge Trophy), Lightning Moon (Bengough Stakes), Eastern Impact (Bengough Stakes) and the improving handicapper The Tin Man.

After tracking the leaders down the centre of the course, Muhaarar took the lead approaching the final furlong and quickly established a clear advantage. Twilight Son finished strongly on the stands side but the result was never in doubt as Muhaarar won by two lengths. Danzeno finished third ahead of The Tin Man and Naadirr. Hills said "He's been very straightforward. He certainly has the will to win and he's got a beautiful temperament and great looks. He's gone a little bit in his coat in the past two days, but I think that was a career best". Hamdan Al Maktoum ruled out a challenge for the Breeders' Cup, saying that the tight turns at Keeneland would not suit the colt's racing style. Hills accepted the owner's decision but said that in his opinion the colt would have coped with the course. The Racing Post rated the performance the best by a European sprinter since 2011, and ranked him as the third-best three-year-old colt of the season behind Golden Horn and American Pharoah.

== Assessment and awards ==
On 10 November 2015, Muhaarar was named Cartier Champion Sprinter at the 25th edition of the Cartier Racing Awards.

== Stud career ==
At the end of his three-year-old season, Muhaarar was retired from racing to become a breeding stallion at his owner's Nunnery Stud at Thetford in Norfolk.

=== Notable progeny ===
c = colt, f = filly, g = gelding

Foaled	Name	Sex	Major Wins
2018	Eshaada	f	British Champions Fillies and Mares Stakes
2020	Marhaba Ya Sanafi	c	Poule d'Essai des Poulains
2020	Be Your Best	f	Gamely Stakes
2020	Cicero's Gift	g	Queen Elizabeth II Stakes

== Pedigree ==
Pedigree of Muhaarar (GB), bay colt, 2012
Sire Oasis Dream (GB) 2000	Green Desert (USA); 1983	Danzig	Northern Dancer
Sire Oasis Dream (GB) 2000	Green Desert (USA); 1983	Danzig	Pas de Nom
Sire Oasis Dream (GB) 2000	Green Desert (USA); 1983	Foreign Courier	Sir Ivor
Sire Oasis Dream (GB) 2000	Green Desert (USA); 1983	Foreign Courier	Courtly Dee
Sire Oasis Dream (GB) 2000	Hope (IRE); 1991	Dancing Brave	Lyphard
Sire Oasis Dream (GB) 2000	Hope (IRE); 1991	Dancing Brave	Navajo Princess
Sire Oasis Dream (GB) 2000	Hope (IRE); 1991	Bahamian	Mill Reef
Sire Oasis Dream (GB) 2000	Hope (IRE); 1991	Bahamian	Sorbus
Dam Tahrir (IRE) 2002	Linamix (FR); 1987	Mendez	Bellypha
Dam Tahrir (IRE) 2002	Linamix (FR); 1987	Mendez	Miss Carina
Dam Tahrir (IRE) 2002	Linamix (FR); 1987	Lunadix	Breton
Dam Tahrir (IRE) 2002	Linamix (FR); 1987	Lunadix	Lutine
Dam Tahrir (IRE) 2002	Miss Sacha (IRE); 1991	Last Tycoon	Try My Best
Dam Tahrir (IRE) 2002	Miss Sacha (IRE); 1991	Last Tycoon	Mill Prince
Dam Tahrir (IRE) 2002	Miss Sacha (IRE); 1991	Heaven High	High Line
Dam Tahrir (IRE) 2002	Miss Sacha (IRE); 1991	Heaven High	Triumphant (Family: 13-e)
