= Amber Sky =

Ferris wheel in Gdańsk

AmberSky Gdańsk
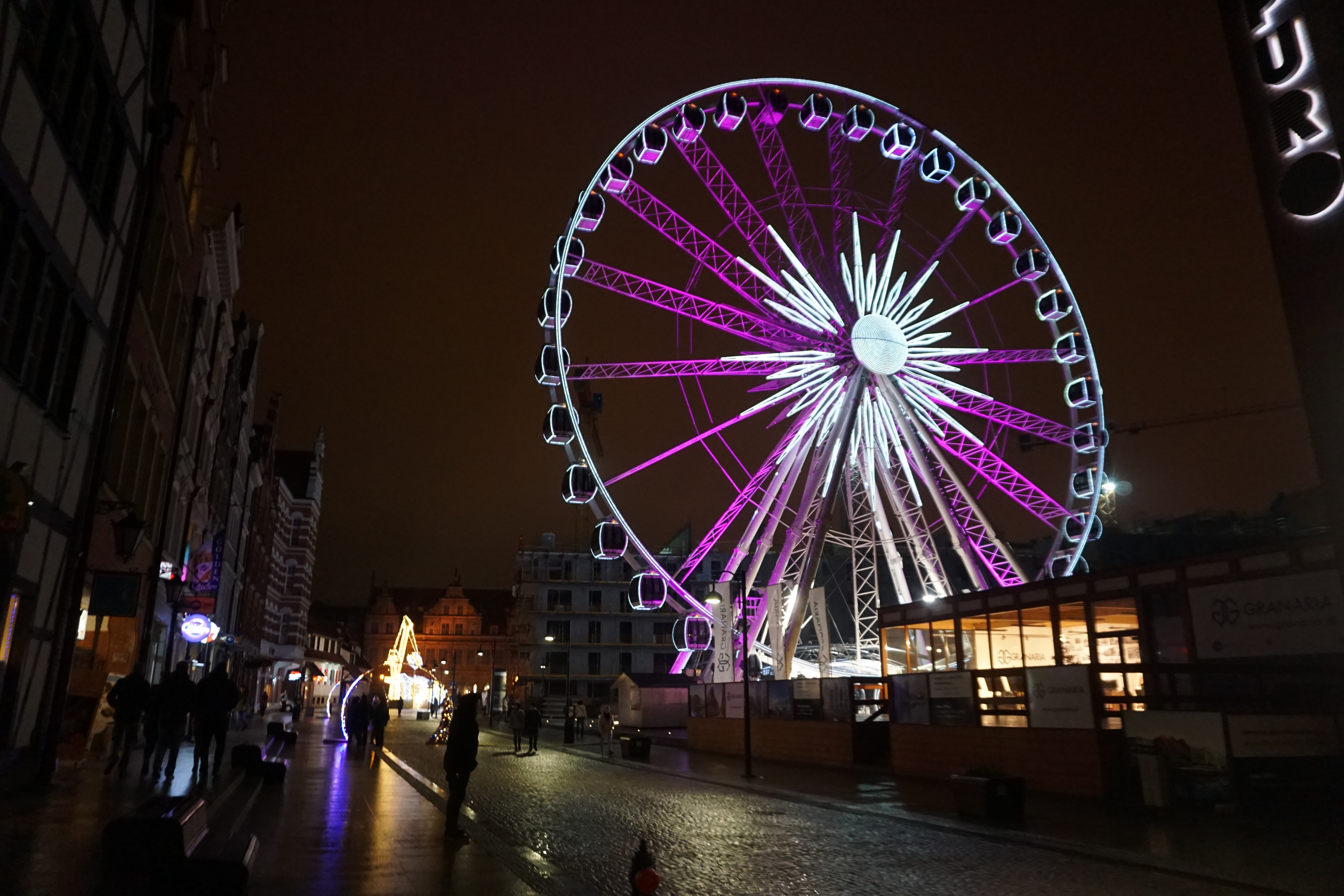
- Interactive map of the AmberSky Gdańsk area

General information
- Status: Operational
- Type: Ferris wheel
- Location: Gdańsk, Poland, Ołowianka 1, Gdansk, Poland
- Coordinates: 54.3527694°N 18.6592275°E
- Opened: 2016-07
- Owner: SkyWheels Poland

Height
- Height: 50 m (164 ft)

Amber Sky is a Ferris wheel in Gdańsk. At a height of 50 metres (160 ft), it opened to the public in June 2016. Initially located on Granary Island, it changed locations and was reopened on Ołowianka in 2018.

== Design ==
The Netherlands-based Dutch Wheels designed and constructed the wheel; it was built in accordance with the specifications of the model R50SP-36. It has 36 climate-controlled gondolas that can accommodate eight people each. A VIP gondola features a glass floor. Each gondola weighs 440 tonnes (69,000 st).
