= Temple Stakes =

Flat horse race in Britain

- Class: Group 2
- Location: Haydock Park; Haydock, England
- Inaugurated: 1965
- Race type: Flat / Thoroughbred
- Sponsor: Betfred
- Website: Haydock Park

Race information
- Distance: 5f (1,006 metres)
- Surface: Turf
- Track: Straight
- Qualification: Three-years-old and up
- Weight: 8 st 12 lb (3yo); 9 st 6 lb (4yo+); Allowances; 3 lb for fillies and mares Penalties; 5 lb for Group 1 winners * 3 lb for Group 2 winners* * since August 31 last year
- Purse: £125,000 (2024); 1st: £70,888

Temple Stakes
2026
Night Raider	American Affair	Beautiful Diamond

Previous years
2025
Mgheera	She's Quality	Washington Heights
2024
Kerdos	Live In The Dream	Seven Questions
2023
Dramatised	Equilateral	Live In The Dream
2022
King's Lynn	Twilight Calls	Arecibo
2021
Liberty Beach	Ainsdale	Lady In France

2020-2011
2019
Battaash	Alpha Delphini	Mabs Cross
2018
Battaash	Washington Dc	Kachy
2017
Priceless	Goldream	Alpha Delphini
2016
Profitable	Mecca's Angel	Waady
2015
Pearl Secret	Jack Dexter	Wind Fire
2014
Hot Streak	Pearl Secret	Kingsgate Native
2013
Kingsgate Native	Swiss Spirit	Reckless Abandon
2012
Bated Breath	Sole Power	Spirit Quartz
2011
Sole Power	Kingsgate Native	Prohibit

2010-2001
2010
Kingsgate Native	Equiano	Borderlescott
2009
Look Busy	Borderlescott	Wi Dud
2008
Fleeting Spirit	Borderlescott	Desert Lord
2006
Reverence	The Trader	Mecca's Mate
2005
Celtic Mill	Orientor	Balmont
2004
Night Prospector	Autumn Pearl	Bishops Court
2003
Airwave	Repertory	Acclamation
2002
Kyllachy	Vision Of Night	Monkston Point
2001
Cassandra Go	Vision Of Night	Nuclear Debate

2000-1991
2000
Perryston View	Proud Native	Rambling Bear
1999
Tipsy Creek	Lochangel	Andreyev
1998
Bolshoi	Lochangel	Elnadim
1997
Croft Pool	Brave Edge	Bolshoi
1996
Mind Games	Struggler	Woodborough
1995
Mind Games	Millstream	Owington
1994
Lochsong	Lavinia Fontana	Midhish
1993
Paris House	Wolfhound	Garah
1992
Snaadee	Blyton Lad	Medaille D'Or
1991
Elbio	Dominio	Rivers Rhapsody

1990-1988
1990
Dayjur	Tigani	Statoblest
1989
Dancing Dissident	Wonder Dancer	Cadeaux Genereux
1988
Handsome Sailor	Perion	Chilibang

The Temple Stakes is a Group 2 flat horse race in Great Britain open to horses aged three years or older. It is run at Haydock Park over a distance of 5 furlongs (1,006 metres), and it is scheduled to take place each year in May.

The event was established in 1965, and it was originally held at Sandown Park. It was transferred to its present venue in 2008.

The leading horses from the Temple Stakes often go on to compete in the King Charles III Stakes. The last to win both races in the same year was Profitable in 2016.

== Records ==
Most successful horse (2 wins):

- Mind Games – 1995, 1996
- Kingsgate Native - 2010, 2013
- Battaash - 2018, 2019

Leading jockey (4 wins):

- Lester Piggott – Falcon (1967), Raffingora (1970), Shoolerville (1972), Fearless Lad (1983)
- Walter Swinburn – Petorius (1984, dead-heat), Treasure Kay (1987), Dancing Dissident (1989), Elbio (1991)

Leading trainer (5 wins):

- Sir Michael Stoute – Blue Cashmere (1975), Petorius (1984, dead-heat), Dancing Dissident (1989), Snaadee (1992), Kingsgate Native (2010)

== Winners ==
Year	Winner	Age	Jockey	Trainer	Time
1965	Holborn	3	Scobie Breasley	Fulke Johnson Houghton	1:00.04
1966	Polyfoto	4	Brian Taylor	Eddie Reavey	1:00.40
1967	Falcon	3	Lester Piggott	Fulke Johnson Houghton	1:07.40
1968	D'Urberville	3	Jimmy Lindley	Jeremy Tree	1:01.40
1969	Song	3	Joe Mercer	Derrick Candy	1:04.40
1970	Raffingora	5	Lester Piggott	Bill Marshall	1:00.60
1971	Mummy's Pet	3	Geoff Lewis	John Sutcliffe	1:02.00
1972	Shoolerville	3	Lester Piggott	Sam Armstrong	1:01.20
1973 (Note: The 1973 running took place at Kempton Park.)	Saulingo	3	Bill Williamson	Paul Davey	0:59.47
1974	Bay Express	3	Brian Taylor	Peter Nelson	1:00.88
1975	Blue Cashmere	5	Frankie Durr	Michael Stoute	1:00.86
1976	Lochnager	4	Eddie Hide	Mick Easterby	1:00.94
1977	Vilgora	5	Steve Perks	A Stevens	1:03.57
1978 (dh)	Oscilight; Smarten Up	3; 3	Brian Rouse; Taffy Thomas	John Sutcliffe; Bill Wightman	0:59.80
1979	Double Form	4	John Reid	Fulke Johnson Houghton	1:04.00
1980	Sharpo	3	Brian Rouse	Jeremy Tree
1981	Abandoned due to waterlogging
1982	Mummy's Game	3	Tony Ives	Bill O'Gorman	0:59.75
1983	Fearless Lad	4	Lester Piggott	Dick Peacock	1:03.57
1984 (dh)	Petorius; Reesh	3; 3	Walter Swinburn; Taffy Thomas	Michael Stoute; Bill O'Gorman	1:01.81
1985	Never So Bold	5	Steve Cauthen	Robert Armstrong	1:00.63
1986	Double Schwartz	5	Pat Eddery	Charlie Nelson	1:02.00
1987	Treasure Kay	4	Walter Swinburn	Peter Makin	1:00.45
1988	Handsome Sailor	5	Michael Hills	Barry Hills	1:00.88
1989	Dancing Dissident	3	Walter Swinburn	Michael Stoute	1:00.28
1990	Dayjur	3	Willie Carson	Dick Hern	1:01.89
1991	Elbio	4	Walter Swinburn	Peter Makin	0:59.87
1992	Snaadee	5	Pat Eddery	Michael Stoute	1:00.30
1993	Paris House	4	John Carroll	Jack Berry	1:00.99
1994	Lochsong	6	Frankie Dettori	Ian Balding	1:00.84
1995	Mind Games	3	John Carroll	Jack Berry	1:00.10
1996	Mind Games	4	John Carroll	Jack Berry	1:00.99
1997	Croft Pool	6	Gary Carter	Jeremy Glover	1:01.55
1998	Bolshoi	6	Carl Lowther	Jack Berry	1:01.94
1999	Tipsy Creek	5	Richard Hills	Ben Hanbury	1:00.77
2000	Perryston View	8	John Reid	Jeremy Glover	1:04.45
2001	Cassandra Go	5	Michael Roberts	Geoff Wragg	1:00.63
2002	Kyllachy	4	Jamie Spencer	Henry Candy	1:00.58
2003	Airwave	3	Dane O'Neill	Henry Candy	1:00.33
2004 (Note: The 2004 race took place at Epsom. It was run without starting stalls, and it was hand-timed)	Night Prospector	4	Johnny Murtagh	Pip Payne	0:56.10
2005	Celtic Mill	7	Philip Robinson	David Barker	1:00.06
2006	Reverence	5	Kevin Darley	Eric Alston	1:02.10
2007	Sierra Vista	7	Paul Hanagan	David Barker	1:01.02
2008	Fleeting Spirit	3	Ryan Moore	Jeremy Noseda	0:57.15
2009	Look Busy	4	Slade O'Hara	Alan Berry	1:04.03
2010	Kingsgate Native	5	Ryan Moore	Sir Michael Stoute	0:58.92
2011	Sole Power	4	Keagan Latham	Edward Lynam	0:57.67
2012	Bated Breath	5	George Baker	Roger Charlton	0:56.39
2013	Kingsgate Native	8	Shane Kelly	Robert Cowell	0:59.25
2014	Hot Streak	3	Oisin Murphy	Kevin Ryan	1:00.15
2015	Pearl Secret	6	George Baker	David Barron	1:00.36
2016	Profitable	4	Adam Kirby	Clive Cox	0:59.40
2017	Priceless	4	Adam Kirby	Clive Cox	0:57.55
2018	Battaash	4	Dane O'Neill	Charles Hills	0:57.36
2019	Battaash	5	Jim Crowley	Charles Hills	0:57.70
	no race 2020 (Note: The 2020 running was cancelled because of the COVID-19 pandemic in the United Kingdom)
2021	Liberty Beach	4	Jason Hart	John Quinn	1:03.99
2022	King's Lynn	5	David Probert	Andrew Balding	0:58.88
2023	Dramatised	3	William Buick	Karl Burke	0:58.70
2024	Kerdos	4	Richard Kingscote	Clive Cox	0:59.64
2025	Mgheera	5	William Buick	Ed Walker	0:59.18
2026	Night Raider	5	Clifford Lee	Karl Burke	1:01.02

== See also ==
- Horse racing in Great Britain
- List of British flat horse races
