= Prix du Gros Chêne =

Flat horse race in France

- Class: Group 2
- Location: Chantilly Racecourse; Chantilly, France
- Inaugurated: 1857
- Race type: Flat / Thoroughbred
- Website: france-galop.com

Race information
- Distance: 1,000 metres (5f)
- Surface: Turf
- Track: Straight
- Qualification: Three-years-old and up
- Weight: 55 kg (3yo); 58 kg (4yo+); Allowances; 1½ kg for fillies and mares Penalties; 3 kg for Group 1 winners * 2 kg for Group 2 winners * 1 kg if two Group 3 wins * * since July 1 last year
- Purse: €130,000 (2022); 1st: €74,100

Prix du Gros Chêne
2025
Monteille	Lesslepasser	Ponntos

Previous years
2024
Ponntos	Mgheera	Pradaro
2023
Game Run	Get Ahead	Marshman
2022
Brostaigh	Air De Valse	White Lavender
2021
Pradaro	Berneuil	Batwan

2020-2011
2020
Tour To Paris	Gold Vibe	Ken Colt
2018
Finsbury Square	Gold Vibe	A Momentofmadness
2017
Muthmir	Finsbury Square	Plusquemavie
2016
Son Cesio	Catcall	Finsbury Square
2015
Muthmir	Catcall	Spirit Quartz
2014
Rangali	Catcall	Dibajj
2013
Spirit Quartz	Catcall	Gammarth
2012
Wizz Kid	Stepper Point	Hamish McGonagall
2011
Wizz Kid	Prohibit	Inxile

2010-2001
2010
Planet Five	Piccadilly Filly	Marchand D'Or
2009
Tax Free	Black Mambazo	Benbaun
2008
Marchand D'Or	Equiano	Sir Gerry
2007
Beauty Is Truth	Peace Offering	Moss Vale
2006
Moss Vale	Benbaun	Tax Free
2005
The Trader	Benbaun	Avonbridge
2004
Avonbridge	Porlezza	The Trader
2003
Porlezza	Zipping	The Trader
2002
Porlezza	Maybe Forever	Dobby Road
2001
Dananeyev	Season's Greetings	Messoeurs

2000-1990
2000
Nuclear Debate	Watching	Seltitude
1999
Sainte Marine	Dream Chief	Red Prairie
1998
Sainte Marine	Piperi	Zelding
1997
Titus Livius	Wardara	Hever Golf Rose
1996
Anabaa	Easy Option	General Alan
1995
Millyant	Diffident	Struggler
1994
Spain Lane	Blue Siren	Way West
1993
Surprise Offer	Monde Bleu	Lochsong
1992
Monde Bleu	Showbrook	Wedding Of The Sea
1991
Divine Danse	Touch And Love	Noble Kara
1990
Nabeel Dancer	Ron's Victory	Luring

The Prix du Gros Chêne is a Group 2 flat horse race in France open to thoroughbreds aged three years or older. It is run at Chantilly over a distance of 1,000 metres (about 5 furlongs), and it is scheduled to take place each year in late May or early June.

== History ==
The event was established in 1857, and it was originally contested over 800 metres. Its title refers to a large oak tree which stood in the grounds of the racecourse – the English translation of Gros Chêne is "Great Oak". The race was abandoned because of the Franco-Prussian War in 1871. It was extended to 1,000 metres in 1881.

The Prix du Gros Chêne was cancelled throughout World War I, with no running from 1915 to 1918. The first two post-war editions were run over 1,100 metres at Longchamp.

The race was abandoned once during World War II, in 1940. It was staged at Maisons-Laffitte from 1941 to 1943, and at Auteuil with a distance of 900 metres in 1944. It returned to Maisons-Laffitte in 1945, and it was transferred to Longchamp in 1946. Five successive runnings during the wartime period were won by one horse, Fine Art. The race returned to its original venue, Chantilly, in 1957.

The present system of race grading was introduced in 1971, and for a period the Prix du Gros Chêne held Group 3 status. It was promoted to Group 2 level in 1988. The race is now held on the same day as the Prix du Jockey Club.

== Records ==
Most successful horse (5 wins):

- Fine Art – 1942, 1943, 1944, 1945, 1946

Leading jockey (9 wins):

- Roger Poincelet – Fine Art (1944, 1945, 1946), Kalpack (1954), Palariva (1956), Jini (1957), Sly Pola (1960), High Bulk (1961), L'Epinay (1963)

Leading trainer (7 wins):

- François Mathet – Joshua (1953), Edellic (1958, 1959), Texanita (1964), Farhana (1967), Rockcress (1969), Adraan (1980)
- Robert Collet - Kind Music (1982), Last Tycoon (1986), Sainte Marine (1988, 1989), Beauty Is Truth (2007), Wizz Kid (2011, 2012)

Leading owner (5 wins):

- Claude-Joachim Lefèvre – Alaric (1872), Regane (1873), Octave (1883), Feuillage (1886), Frapotel (1888)
- Pierre Wertheimer – Epinard (1923), La Fayette (1929), Quartz (1933), Sanguine (1951), Kalpack (1954)
- Louis de La Rochette – Fine Art (1942, 1943, 1944, 1945, 1946)

== Winners since 1980 ==
Year	Winner	Age	Jockey	Trainer	Owner	Time
1980	Adraan	3	Yves Saint-Martin	François Mathet	HH Aga Khan IV
1981	Sonoma	3	Freddy Head	Criquette Head	Haras d'Etreham
1982	Kind Music	3	Cash Asmussen	Robert Collet	Bendar bin M. Al Kabir	0:55.2
1983	Gem Diamond	5	Alain Badel	C. da Meda	Mrs Pierre Poinsot
1984	Royal Hobbit	6	Guy Guignard	Mick Bartholomew	Seamus McGrath
1985	Parioli	4	Maurice Philipperon	John Cunnington, Jr.	Danny Arnold
1986	Last Tycoon	3	Yves Saint-Martin	Robert Collet	Richard C. Strauss	0:56.6
1987	Tenue de Soiree	3	Gary W. Moore	Criquette Head	Haras d'Etreham	0:57.6
1988	Glifahda	5	Freddy Head	David Smaga	Baron Thierry van Zuylen	0:59.6
1989	Viva Zapata	3	Tony Cruz	Jonathan Pease	Ecurie I. M. Fares	0:58.8
1990	Nabeel Dancer	5	Pat Eddery	Alex Scott	Maktoum Al Maktoum	0:58.8
1991	Divine Danse	3	Freddy Head	Criquette Head	Ecurie Aland	0:58.2
1992	Monde Bleu	4	Dominique Boeuf	André Fabre	Daniel Wildenstein	0:59.1
1993	Surprise Offer	3	Bruce Raymond	Richard Hannon, Sr.	7th Earl of Carnarvon	0:58.6
1994	Spain Lane	3	Walter Swinburn	André Fabre	Maktoum Al Maktoum	0:58.7
1995	Millyant	5	Cash Asmussen	Rae Guest	Chris Mills	0:57.8
1996	Anabaa (Note: The 1996 running took place at Deauville)	4	Freddy Head	Criquette Head	Ghislaine Head	1:00.0
1997	Titus Livius	4	Cash Asmussen	Jonathan Pease	Niarchos Family	0:59.5
1998	Sainte Marine	3	Dominique Boeuf	Robert Collet	Richard C. Strauss	0:58.8
1999	Sainte Marine	4	Cash Asmussen	Robert Collet	Richard C. Strauss	0:59.5
2000	Nuclear Debate	5	Gérald Mossé	John Hammond	Bob Chester	0:58.7
2001	Dananeyev	5	Olivier Doleuze	Carlos Laffon-Parias	Wertheimer et Frère	0:58.4
2002	Porlezza	3	Christophe Soumillon	Yves de Nicolay	Erika Hilger	0:57.4
2003	Porlezza	4	Olivier Peslier	Yves de Nicolay	Erika Hilger	0:56.8
2004	Avonbridge	4	Steve Drowne	Roger Charlton	Daniel Deer	0:58.1
2005	The Trader	7	Ted Durcan	Michael Blanshard	Caroline Ward	0:58.6
2006	Moss Vale	5	Kieren Fallon	David Nicholls	Lady O'Reilly	0:56.9
2007	Beauty Is Truth	3	Thierry Thulliez	Robert Collet	Richard C. Strauss	0:57.3
2008	Marchand d'Or	5	Davy Bonilla	Freddy Head	Carla Giral	0:57.2
2009	Tax Free	7	Adrian Nicholls	David Nicholls	Ian Hewitson	0:56.7
2010	Planet Five	4	Christophe Lemaire	Pascal Bary	Niarchos Family	0:58.6
2011	Wizz Kid	3	Ioritz Mendizabal	Robert Collet	Maeve Mahony	0:58.4
2012	Wizz Kid	4	Gérald Mossé	Robert Collet	Maeve Mahony	0:59.5
2013	Spirit Quartz	5	Jamie Spencer	Robert Cowell	Qatar Racing Limited	0:57.63
2014	Rangali	3	Fabrice Veron	Henri-Alex Pantall	Henri-Alex Pantall	0:57.32
2015	Muthmir	5	Paul Hanagan	William Haggas	Hamdan Al Maktoum	0:58.22
2016	Son Cesio	5	Vincent Cheminaud	Henri-Alex Pantall	Yves Borotra	0:59.58
2018	Finsbury Square	6	Olivier Peslier	Mauricio Delcher Sanchez	Berend Van Dalfsen	0:57.91
2019	Inns Of Court	5	Mickael Barzalona	André Fabre	Godolphin	0:57.64
2020	Tour To Paris (Note: The 2020 running took place at Deauville due to the COVID-19 pandemic)	5	Christophe Soumillon	Pia Brandt	Jathiere / Augustin-Normand	0:55.81
2021	Pradaro	6	Aurélien Lemaitre	Sofie Lanslots	Stal Vie En Rose	0:57.83
2022	Brostaigh	3	Dylan Browne McMonagle	Joseph O'Brien	Scott C Heider	0:58.59
2023	Game Run	4	Marvin Grandin	Patrice Cottier	Stephane Grandin & Michel Nikitas	0:55.81
2024	Ponntos	6	Mickael Barzalona	Miroslav Nieslanik	Dr Eva Nieslanikova	0:57.72
2025	Monteille	4	Cristian Demuro	Mario Baratti	Gerard Augustin-Normand	0:56.69
2026	Sajir	5	Oisin Murphy	André Fabre	Prince A A Faisal	0:56:46

== Earlier winners ==
- 1857: Brassia
- 1858:
- 1859: Phenix
- 1860: Geologie
- 1861:
- 1862: Sauterelle
- 1863: Gentilhomme
- 1864: Partisan
- 1865:
- 1866: Anglo Saxon
- 1867: Czar
- 1868: Dragon
- 1869: Turco
- 1870: Manette
- 1871: no race
- 1872: Alaric
- 1873: Regane
- 1874: Tabellion
- 1875: Pensacola
- 1876: Pensacola
- 1877: Pensacola
- 1878: Gladia
- 1879: Porcelaine
- 1880: Mademoiselle Mars
- 1881: Feuille de Frene
- 1882: Beausejour
- 1883: Octave
- 1884: Richelieu
- 1885: Directrice
- 1886: Feuillage
- 1887: Oviedo
- 1888: Frapotel
- 1889: Lugano
- 1890: Eclair
- 1891: Reveille
- 1892: Reveille
- 1893: Hoche
- 1894: Hoche
- 1895: Soberano
- 1896:
- 1897: Double Tour
- 1898: Valparaiso
- 1899: Railleur
- 1900: Avant Garde
- 1901: Calapita
- 1902: Zulma
- 1903: Romulus
- 1904:
- 1905: Mandarin
- 1906: Chanaan
- 1907: Go to Bed
- 1908: Syphon
- 1909:
- 1910: Fils du Vent
- 1911: Racine
- 1912: Gilles de Rai
- 1913: Turlupin
- 1914: Mont d'Or
- 1915–18: no race
- 1919: Setauket
- 1920: Glorious
- 1921: Phusla
- 1922: Phusla
- 1923: Epinard
- 1924: Niceas
- 1925: Faraway
- 1926: Mackwiller
- 1927: Titan
- 1928: Songe
- 1929: La Fayette
- 1930: Baoule
- 1931:
- 1932: Lovelace
- 1933: Quartz
- 1934: Shining Tor
- 1935: Renette
- 1936: Limac
- 1937: Limac
- 1938:
- 1939: Romeo
- 1940: no race
- 1941: Thread
- 1942: Fine Art
- 1943: Fine Art
- 1944: Fine Art
- 1945: Fine Art
- 1946: Fine Art
- 1947: Thiercelin
- 1948: Solina
- 1949: Boree
- 1950: Skylarking
- 1951: Sanguine
- 1952: Luzon
- 1953: Joshua
- 1954: Kalpack
- 1955: Dictaway
- 1956: Palariva
- 1957: Jini
- 1958: Edellic
- 1959: Edellic
- 1960: Sly Pola
- 1961: High Bulk
- 1962: L'Épinay
- 1963: L'Épinay
- 1964: Texanita
- 1965: Holborn
- 1966: Yours
- 1967: Farhana
- 1968: Be Friendly / Klaizia (Note: The 1968 race was a dead-heat and has joint winners)
- 1969: Rockcress
- 1970: Balidar
- 1971: Montgomery
- 1972: Montgomery
- 1973: Saulingo
- 1974: Flirting Around
- 1975: Realty
- 1976: Kala Shikari
- 1977: Madang
- 1978: Polyponder
- 1979: Sigy

== See also ==
- List of French flat horse races
