= Dane O'Neill =

Irish jockey

Personal information
- Born: 1 August 1975 (age 51) Dublin, Ireland
- Occupation: Jockey

Horse racing career
- Sport: Horse racing

Major racing wins
- Major races Diadem Stakes (1999); Cork and Orrery Stakes (1999); Prix Maurice de Gheest (2000); Commonwealth Cup (2015)

Significant horses
- Bold Edge

Dane O'Neill (born 1 August 1975) is a retired Irish jockey, who won over 1,800 races in Great Britain over a 25-year career, including the 2015 Commonwealth Cup at Royal Ascot.

== Career ==
O'Neill was born in Dublin, but brought up in Monkstown, County Cork. His uncle was a trainer, and his family had always been interested in racing. He was a skilled showjumper in his youth, and also rode 24 winners in pony races.

He moved to Britain aged 17 and spent his early career riding for Richard Hannon Sr. His first winner was Port Sunlight, at Sandown Park on 15 July 1993. Winners were slow to come, and in his first three seasons, he only rode seven. His career took a step forward in 1996 when he won the apprentice jockeys’ championship with 67 wins.

For Hannon, he won several big sprint races on Bold Edge, including the Cork and Orrery Stakes at Royal Ascot and the Diadem Stakes in 1999 and his first Group 1, the Prix Maurice de Gheest in August 2000. He also won the Jersey Stakes at the 1999 Royal Ascot on Lots of Magic.

2003 was his most successful year with 110 winners. These included Airwave in the Group 2 Temple Stakes for Henry Candy, and another Royal Ascot winner, Macadamia in the Royal Hunt Cup for James Fanshawe. In total, he won over £1.3 million in prize money during the year.

It was five years before he reached 100 winners or £1 million in prize money again, aided by wins in the Stewards' Cup for William Haggas on Conquest I.

He spent a period as stable jockey to Henry Candy. Then, in October 2012, he was appointed second jockey to Sheikh Hamdan al Maktoum, behind Paul Hanagan. The Maktoum partnership led him to the biggest prize of his career – the first Commonwealth Cup at Royal Ascot in 2015 on Muhaarar trained by Charlie Hills. On Mukhadram he finished third in the 2014 King George VI and Queen Elizabeth Stakes.

By the end of 2017, he had nearly 1,700 career victories in Britain, and became the seventh most prolific winner among current jockeys on the retirement of Jimmy Fortune.

O'Neill announced his retirement from riding in March 2024. He had suffered serious injuries in a fall at Wolverhampton in July 2023 and was forced to retire on medical grounds. He rode 1,889 winners in Great Britain.

== Statistics ==
Flat wins in Great Britain by year

Year	Wins	Runs	Strike rate	Total earnings
1992	0	6	0	£1,864
1993	2	25	8	£10,901
1994	5	65	8	£27,395
1995	33	349	9	£300,365
1996	80	742	11	£544,988
1997	61	766	8	£493,183
1998	75	772	10	£539,125
1999	66	772	9	£864,122
2000	32	346	9	£345,696
2001	63	676	9	£723,732
2002	70	808	9	£723,562
2003	110	1018	11	£1,339,838
2004	74	974	8	£948,766
2005	86	902	10	£749,467
2006	94	943	10	£713,894
2007	92	938	10	£651,276
2008	109	947	12	£1,154,512
2009	84	829	10	£712,306
2010	82	865	9	£699,529
2011	96	826	12	£689,312
2012	63	633	10	£431,195
2013	76	515	15	£685,275
2014	62	496	13	£719,909
2015	62	472	13	£1,019,460
2016	36	285	13	£429,221
2017 (Note: correct to 27 Oct)	61	388	16	£634,668

== Major wins ==
(United Kingdom) Great Britain

- Commonwealth Cup – (1) Muhaarar (2015)
- Diamond Jubilee Stakes- (1) Bold Edge (1999)
- British Champions Sprint Stakes – (1) Bold Edge (1999)

France

- Prix Maurice de Gheest – Bold Edge (2000)

United Arab Emirates

- Jebel Hatta – (2) – Alfareeq (2022, 2023)
- Al Quoz Sprint – (1) Danyah (2023)
