= Henry Candy =

British racehorse trainer

Personal information
- Born: 28 October 1944 (age 81)
- Occupation: Trainer

Horse racing career
- Sport: Horse racing

Major racing wins
- British Classic Race wins: Epsom Oaks (1)

Significant horses
- Master Willie, Time Charter, Kyllachy

Henry David Nicholas Bourne Candy (born 28 October 1944) is a British racehorse trainer who specialises in training horses for Flat racing.

Candy gained early experience in Australia and France before assisting his father, Derrick Candy, at his stables in Kingstone Warren in Oxfordshire. Henry Candy took over the licence at the stables at the end of the 1973 season. Earlier in his career he had success with runners in middle-distance races, including Master Willie and Time Charter but has been more notable in the 2010s with his victories in sprint races with Twilight Son and Limato.

== Major wins ==
(United Kingdom) Great Britain

- Champion Stakes - (1) - Time Charter (1982)
- Cheveley Park Stakes - (1) - Airwave (2002)
- Coronation Cup - (2) - Master Willie (1981), Time Charter (1984)
- Diamond Jubilee Stakes - (1) - Twilight Son (2016)
- Eclipse Stakes - (1) - Master Willie (1981)
- Epsom Oaks - (1) - Time Charter (1982)
- Haydock Sprint Cup – (2) - Markab (2010), Twilight Son (2015)
- July Cup – (1) - Limato (2016)
- King George VI and Queen Elizabeth Stakes - (1) - Time Charter (1982)
- Nunthorpe Stakes - (1) Kyllachy (2002)

France

- Prix de la Forêt - (1) - Limato (2016)
