= Jamie Spencer =

Irish flat racing jockey (born 1980)

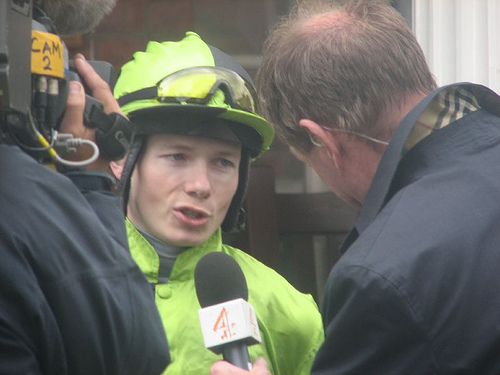
- Jamie Spencer at York Races

Personal information
- Born: 8 June 1980 (age 46) County Tipperary
- Spouse: Emma Ramsden (m. 2005; div. 2010)
- Children: 3

Jamie Spencer (born 8 June 1980, in County Tipperary) is an Irish flat racing jockey currently riding in the UK. He has been champion jockey in both Ireland and Britain and has won seven classics, five in Ireland and two in England. Spencer is an advocate for the art of holding up horses late into the races, and then making use of their natural dash of speed.

== Racing career ==
The son of former County Tipperary National Hunt trainer George Spencer, who trained Winning Fair to win the Champion Hurdle in 1963, Jamie Spencer came to horse riding relatively late in childhood. He made rapid progress and was 17 when he won his first classic, the 1998 Irish 1,000 Guineas on Tarascon, in the process becoming the youngest jockey to win a classic. He was champion apprentice in Ireland the following year with 46 winners. Spencer was educated at Kilkenny College.

Spencer's talents, coupled with riding Brian Boru to victory in the 2003 St Leger at Doncaster for Aidan O'Brien, led to him briefly becoming stable jockey for O'Brien at Ballydoyle. While in that job, he was Irish flat racing Champion Jockey in 2004, with 93 winners. After O'Brien and Spencer parted company, he was replaced as stable jockey in 2005 by Kieren Fallon. He moved to Britain, where he was British flat racing Champion Jockey in 2005, with 180 winners.

In 2007 Spencer was again British Champion Jockey, sharing the title on this occasion with Seb Sanders.

In January 2010, Spencer signed a contract to ride as retained jockey for Mrs Fitri Hay, whose principal trainer is Paul Cole, with other horses trained by Stan Moore and Tom Tate.

In 2010, the trainers for whom Spencer rode most frequently were Michael Bell, Kevin Ryan and Paul Cole. The Hay contract saw him riding again for Aidan O'Brien after she bought shares in multiple Group 1 winners Fame And Glory and Cape Blanco, both of whom continued to be trained by O'Brien. Spencer's wins for O'Brien in the Hay colours included the 2011 Ascot Gold Cup on Fame And Glory. In October 2012, he took up a two-year contract to ride for Sheikh Fahad of Qatar. They teamed up for many wins in 2013 including the Irish 1000 Guineas with Just The Judge.

On 21 August 2014, citing family reasons, Spencer announced he would retire from race riding at the end of the 2014 season and would take up a role as a special advisor at Qatar Racing's stable. However, in December 2014, he reversed that decision and announced he would continue riding as a freelance jockey.

Spencer rode his 2,000th winner in British flat racing in August 2017 when Stake Acclaim won at the Shergar Cup meeting. The milestone made him only the 22nd jockey to ride 2,000 flat winners in Britain, and one of only four jockeys active in 2017 to have reached the landmark.

== Personal life ==
Spencer married Channel 4 Racing presenter Emma Ramsden in February 2005 and they have three children. They divorced in 2010.

== Major wins ==
(Republic of Ireland) Ireland

- Irish 2,000 Guineas – (1) – Phoenix of Spain (2019)
- Irish 1,000 Guineas – (3) – Tarascon (1998), Gossamer (2002), Just The Judge (2013)
- Tattersalls Gold Cup – (1) – Powerscourt (2004)
- Irish Oaks – (1) – Sariska (2009)
- Pretty Polly Stakes - (1)- Via Sistina (2023)
- Matron Stakes (Ireland) – (1) – Red Evie (2006)
- Moyglare Stud Stakes – (1) – Sequoyah (2000)
- Flying Five Stakes – (1) – Benbaun (2004)

(United Kingdom) Great Britain

- St Leger Stakes – (1) – Brian Boru (2003)
- Ascot Gold Cup – (1) – Fame and Glory (2011)
- Champion Stakes – (1) – David Junior (2005)
- Lockinge Stakes – (1) – Red Evie (2007)
- Epsom Oaks – (1) – Sariska (2009)
- St James's Palace Stakes – (1) – Excellent Art (2007)
- Eclipse Stakes – (1) – David Junior (2006)
- Falmouth Stakes – (1) – Macadamia (2003)
- Goodwood Cup – (2) – Big Orange (2015,2016)
- Nunthorpe Stakes – (1) – Kyllachy (2002)
- Haydock Sprint Cup – (1) – Goodricke (2005)
- Middle Park Stakes – (1) – Ad Valorem (2004)
- Sun Chariot Stakes – (1) – Echoes in Eternity (2003)
- Fillies' Mile – (1) – Gossamer (2001)
- British Champions Sprint Stakes – (2) – Maarek (2012), Powerful Glory (2025)
- Vertem Futurity Trophy – (1) – Crowded House (2008)
- Champion Bumper – (1) – Pizarro (2002)
- Queen Elizabeth II Jubilee Stakes - (1) - Khaadem (2023)

Germany

- Bayerisches Zuchtrennen – (1) – Danceteria (2019)
- Grosser Preis von Berlin – (1) – Second Step (2015)

France

- Prix Maurice de Gheest – (1) – King Charlemagne (2001)
- Prix du Moulin de Longchamp – (1) – Excelebration (2011)
- Prix de l'Abbaye de Longchamp – (1) – Desert Lord (2006)
- Prix Jean-Luc Lagardère – (1) – Oratorio (2004)
- Critérium de Saint-Cloud – (1) – Ballingarry (2001)

United Arab Emirates

- Dubai Turf – (1) – David Junior (2006)
- Jebel Hatta – (2) – Divine Task (2002), Wigmore Hall (2011)

United States

- Joe Hirsch Turf Classic Invitational Stakes – (1) – Cape Blanco (2011)
- Arlington Million – (1) – Cape Blanco (2011)
- Man o' War Stakes – (1) – Cape Blanco (2011)
- Belmont Derby – (1) – Deauville (2016)

Canada

- Woodbine Mile – (1) – Trade Storm (2014)
- Northern Dancer Turf Stakes – (2) – Wigmore Hall (2011,2012)
- E. P. Taylor Stakes – (1) – Just The Judge (2014)
- Natalma Stakes – (1) – La Pelosa (2018)

Sporting positions
Preceded by Michael Kinane	Ballydoyle retained jockey 2004–2005	Succeeded by Kieren Fallon
