= The Tatling =

Irish-bred Thoroughbred racehorse

- Sire: Perugino
- Grandsire: Danzig
- Dam: Aunty Eileen
- Damsire: Ahonoora
- Sex: Gelding
- Foaled: 23 April 1997
- Country: Ireland
- Colour: Bay or Brown
- Breeder: Patrick J Power
- Owner: Messrs McGee; The Gardening Partnership; Alan Pine; Dab Hand Racing; Milton Bradley; Darren Hudson-Wood
- Trainer: Michael Bell; David Nicholls; Milton Bradley
- Record: 176: 18-28-25
- Earnings: £687,763

Major wins
- Sprint Stakes (2003); King George Stakes (2003); King's Stand Stakes (2004); World Trophy (2004, 2005)

The Tatling (23 April 1997 – April 2017) was an Irish-bred, British-trained Thoroughbred racehorse. A specialist sprinter, he was noted for his exceptional durability contesting 176 races over thirteen seasons between 1999 and 2011. During his racing career he had at least three different trainers, six owners, and thirty-six jockeys. He retired having won eighteen races and being placed on fifty-three other occasions.

After winning twice as a juvenile he did not record another success until the age of five in 2002 when he won three minor races. He emerged as a top-class sprinter in the following year when he won the Sprint Stakes and the King George Stakes and reached his peak as a seven-year-old in 2004 when he won the King's Stand Stakes at Royal Ascot and the World Trophy. He won a second World Trophy in 2005 but was never a threat at the highest level thereafter. He continued to race until the age of fourteen, winning eight more races and ending his career by taking a minor sprint handicap under joined top-weight from a wide stall on 12 December 2011. He was retired from racing and died in 2017 at the age of 20.

== Background ==
The Tatling was a dark bay or brown gelding with a small white star bred in Ireland by Patrick J Power. His sire Perugino, a half-brother of Sadler's Wells, was retired to stud after winning a maiden race on his only start in 1993. His other progeny have included It's Gino (third in the Prix de l'Arc de Triomphe), Sudurka (Oakleigh Plate) and Testa Rossa (Emirates Stakes). The Tatling's dam Aunty Eileen made little impact as a racehorse but was a half-sister of the Duke of York Stakes winner Lugana Beach. She was also a granddaughter of Amazer who was the dam of Mtoto and the female-line ancestor of Blue Canari.

In September 1998 The Tatling was offered for sale for the first time when the yearling was consigned to the Tattersalls Ireland sale at Fairyhouse and was bought for 54,000 Irish guineas by Bullard Bloodstock. The colt entered the ownership of "Messrs McGee" and was sent into training with Michael Bell at Newmarket, Suffolk.

== Racing career ==
=== 1999 – 2002: early career ===
As a two-year-old The Tatling was beaten in his first three starts before winning a maiden race over five furlongs at Great Yarmouth Racecourse on 14 July. In August he won at Brighton Racecourse and finished second in a valuable sales race in Ireland. On his final start of the year he produced his best performance of the season when he started a 25/1 outsider for the Group Three Cornwallis Stakes at Ascot Racecourse and finished second of the thirteen runners behind the Michael Jarvis-trained Kier Park.

The Tatling raced only four times as a three-year-old and failed to win. He was campaigned without success in major sprint races, finishing unplaced in the Palace House Stakes, the Achilles Stakes and the King's Stand Stakes. He was even less active in 2001, failing to win in three starts. In July of that year he was offered for sale at Tattersalls and bought for 11,000 guineas by the trainer David Nicholls and entered the ownership of The Gardening Partnership.

By the time he reappeared as a five-year-old in 2002, The Tatling had been gelded. In that year he raced fifteen times, competing mainly in handicap races. In the summer he passed into the ownership of the Dab Hand partnership (David Pearson and Alan Pirie) and was transferred to the stable of Milton Bradley in Gloucestershire. Bradley had acquired the horse for £15,000 after he ran in a claiming race at (Folkestone). He recorded his first success since his juvenile season when he won a claiming race at Catterick Racecourse in July and went on to win handicaps at Sandown in August and York in October as well as finishing second as a 33/1 outsider in the Ayr Gold Cup.

=== 2003: six-year-old season ===
In 2003 The Tatling failed to win in his first six races: he did finish first in a handicap at Newmarket Racecourse in May but was disqualified for hampering the runner-up. On 5 July the gelding was stepped up in class for the Listed Sprint Stakes at Sandown in which he was ridden by Darryll Holland and started the 7/2 favourite against twelve opponents. He took the lead in the last 100 yards and won by a head from his stablemate Bali Royal. The next three places were filled by Vision of Night (winner of the Goldene Peitsche), Bahamian Pirate and The Trader (World Trophy). He then finished third to Somnus in the Hackwood Stakes before contesting the Group Three King George Stakes at Goodwood Racecourse on 31 July. With Holland again in the saddle he started 11/4 favourite ahead of the Italian sprinter Slap Shot, Bishops Court (Prix du Petit Couvert), Bahamian Pirate and Smokin Beau (Portland Handicap). After struggling to obtain a clear run, he was switched to the outside and produced a strong late run to take the lead in the final stride and won by a neck from the 16/1 outsider Dragon Flyer.

In the rest of his six-year-old season was beaten in all seven starts but ran consistently well in major sprint races. His best efforts came when finishing second to Oasis Dream in the Nunthorpe Stakes at York Racecourse in August and third behind Patavellian in the Prix de l'Abbaye at Longchamp Racecourse in October. He finished close behind the placed horses in the Haydock Sprint Cup, World Trophy, Diadem Stakes, Bentinck Stakes and Hong Kong Sprint.

=== 2004: seven-year-old season ===
The Tatling began his 2004 season with three further defeats, but ran well on each occasion. He finished second to The Trader in the Prix de Saint-Georges, third to Boogie Street in the Achilles Stakes and fourth to Avonbridge in the Prix du Gros Chêne. On 15 June the gelding was one of nineteen sprinters to contest the Group Two King's Stand Stakes over five furlongs at Royal Ascot. The Palace House Stakes winner Frizzante started favourite, ahead of Majestic Missile (Molecomb Stakes, Cornwallis Stakes) and the Hong Kong-trained Cape of Good Hope with The Tatling fourth choice on 8/1 whilst the other contenders included Smokin Beau, Dragon Flyer, The Trader, Boogie Street and Bahamian Pirate. Holland restrained the gelding as Boogie Street set the pace before moving forward in the last quarter mile. He took the lead entering the final furlong and won by one and a half lengths and a neck from Cape of Good Hope and Frizzante. Holland describer The Tatling as "a very tough horse" whilst the owner David Pearson revealed that he and Alan Pirie had landed a "massive gamble" and would collect £150,000 in winning bets.

Ryan Moore took over from Holland after The Tatling finished unplaced in the Sprint Stakes in July. Later that summer he finished third to Ringmoor Down in King George Stakes, second to Bahamian Pirate and second to Pivotal Point when favourite for the Prix du Petit Couvert. In September he made his second bid to Win the World Trophy and started 5/1 joint second favourite behind Pivotal Point and alongside the filly Airwave whilst the other runners included Majestic Missile, Boogie Street and the recent American import Var. After tracking the leaders the gelding moved up into second place as Var took the lead approaching the final furlong. The Tatling overtook the American horse in the final strides and won by a head, with Airwave a length and a quarter away in third.

In his last three races of the season he finished third to Pivotal Point in the Diadem Stakes and second to Var in the Prix de l'Abbaye before ending the year by finishing unplaced in the Hong Kong Sprint.

=== 2005: eight-year-old season ===
The Tatling took some time to reach his best form in 2005 running unplaced in the Prix de Saint-Georges and the Temple Stakes before appearing at the Royal Meeting (run that year at York) where he finished seventh when attempting to repeat his 2004 success in the King's Stand Stakes and eighth in the Golden Jubilee Stakes. He showed some improvement in July when he was placed in both the Sprint Stakes and the King George Stakes before contesting the Nunthorpe Stakes for the third time. He produced one of his best efforts as he overcame a slipping saddle to produce a strong late run and failed by only ahead to overhaul La Cucaracha. Milton Bradley commented "We would have got her in two more strides. The other horse got first run and we just had a shade of traffic problems. I'm very pleased but frustrated and very proud of the horse. He's the most consistent sprinter in the country".

On his next appearance The Tatling was beaten by Benbaun when favourite for the Flying Five at the Curragh and then attempted to win the World Trophy for the second year in succession. He was made the 5/2 second favourite behind Majestic Missile whilst the other eleven runners included his old rivals Boogie Street and The Trader. He was restrained by Moore in the early stages before beginning to make ground in the last quarter mile. He overtook Majestic Missile inside the final furlong and won by a neck with Boogie Street in third. In his two subsequent races that year, The Tatling finished sixth to Avonbridge in the Prix de l'Abbaye and fifth in the Bentinck Stakes.

=== 2006 – 2011: later career ===
The Tatling continued to compete against top-class opposition in 2006 but struggled against the leading sprinters and failed to win in thirteen races. His nearest he came to winning came in the King George Stakes, when he finished a close fourth behind La Cucaracha. In the following year he alternated between weight-for-age races and handicaps and recorded his only success in thirteen starts when he won a minor stakes race at Musselburgh Racecourse in May, beating River Falcon by a head. As an eleven-year-old, The Tatling was campaigned exclusively in handicaps and won two minor events from fourteen starts. He came home first at Brighton Racecourse in October and was then switched to compete on synthetic tracks to take a race at Southwell in December. In 2009 The Tatling was exceptionally active, appearing twenty-eight times between 6 January and 30 December and being ridden in most of his races by Jack Dean. He won three times, taking minor events at Southwell in February, Bath in July and Newbury in August. He was almost as active but less successful in 2010, failing to win in twenty races.

Milton Bradley explained the horse's continuing presence on the track saying "we tried to retire him a couple of years ago, but he absolutely hated it. We had a lovely paddock for him, and a pony for a companion, but every day he was there by the gate, hanging about and wanting to come in and be part of what was going on. When the string went down the road next to his field, he'd follow them down the inside of the hedge and gaze after them. So we took the hint and brought him back into training". In another interview he described the horse's character: "He's quiet and doesn't like me making too much of a fuss of him. I wouldn't spend half an hour patting him and stroking him because he's not that type of person. When he was sent up the gallops with the rest of the string he used to work himself up, get on edge. So we started training him on his own. Now, the only time he gallops with another horse is in a race. He's quite highly strung. He don't want to be friends with everybody. He's very friendly with the people he knows but he's a bit of a loner when it comes to mixing with big crowds".

=== Final race ===
In his final season, The Tatling, now a fourteen-year-old, was beaten in his first eleven races before winning a claiming race at Yarmouth Racecourse on 30 June. After five further defeats he made his final appearance in a five-furlong handicap at Wolverhampton Racecourse on 12 December in which he was ridden by Richard Kingscote and under top-weight he started a 16/1 outsider in a thirteen-runner field. Bradley announced that it would be The Tatling's last race, admitting that the horse had "just lost a bit of his sparkle".

From a wide stall position with only two horses on his outside, The Tatling started relaxed and was placed by Richard Kingscote in the rear of the pack where he sat for the first part of the race. At the turn he began making progress but could not obtain a clear passage in the home straight and had to be maneuvered between horses going from the inner right through the pack back on their outside. At the same time, he was producing a strong run that eventually got him near the leaders and with his final strides managed to win in a three-way photo-finish from Novabridge and Grand Stitch. His owner Darren Hudson-Wood, who had acquired the horse in the summer, said "I nearly cried a second ago. I didn't expect him to be in the first five, to be honest. That was incredible". Bradley was interviewed after the race and said "I know it was only a small race, but what a wonderful story. The horse is still a star in our eyes. He's one of those you drop on by mistake and spend the rest of your life looking for another one half as good. So many people in the country must know about him – it's unbelievable. He wasn't the easiest to train and it took us a while to get to know him. We learnt how he liked to come through horses and use that turn of foot in the last furlong – that's how he won the King's Stand Stakes at Royal Ascot... He's been a marvellous servant for everyone involved with him... We're going to have to be very cautious now how we treat him as he won't want to be left without going out and seeing life."

== Death ==
The Tatling was euthanised in April 2017 at the age of 20. Milton Bradley's granddaughter Sarah announced on the horse's Facebook fan page "I'm sorry to say it is bad news and that we have had to have him put to sleep. His eyesight failed him and it was no longer fair on him... He enjoyed his retirement at the yards where he didn't want for anything and was looked after the way he deserved".

== Jockeys ==
During his racing career The Tatling was ridden by thirty-six different jockeys:

Name	First ride	Last ride	Rides	Wins
Micky Fenton	15 May 1999	20 April 2001	11	2
John Reid	29 August 1999	29 August 1999	1	0
Richard Hughes	27 May 2000	25 August 2002	2	0
Alex Greaves	15 September 2001	24 July 2002	7	1
Willie Supple	8 June 2002	8 June 2002	1	0
Paul Fitzsimons	4 August 2002	8 September 2008	5	0
Lee Enstone	17 August 2002	17 August 2002	1	0
Liam Keniry	31 August 2002	2 August 2011	8	1
Ryan Moore	12 October 2002	8 September 2006	31	3
Frankie Dettori	4 May 2003	1 June 2010	4	0
Kevin Darley	15 May 2003	16 September 2007	5	0
Keith Dalgleish	27 June 2003	27 June 2003	1	0
Darryll Holland	5 July 2003	2 August 2007	18	4
Ted Durcan	16 September 2006	16 September 2006	1	0
Jamie Spencer	28 September 2006	28 September 2006	1	0
Jimmy Quinn	12 October 2006	12 October 2006	1	0
Kevin Ghunowa	9 June 2007	23 August 2007	3	0
Franny Norton	4 August 2007	4 August 2007	1	0
Pietro Romano	27 August 2007	27 August 2007	1	0
William Buick	24 June 2008	24 June 2008	1	0
Michael Metcalfe	27 July 2008	6 January 2009	2	0
Pat Cosgrave	16 September 2008	16 September 2008	1	0
Jack Dean	11 October 2008	2 August 2010	37	4
Neil Brown	7 November 2008	7 November 2008	1	0
Robert Winston	6 February 2009	3 February 2010	5	1
Luke Morris	2 January 2010	8 September 2011	2	0
H Davies	24 June 2010	6 June 2011	3	0
Ashley Morgan	12 July 2010	12 July 2010	1	0
Billy Cray	15 August 2010	15 August 2010	1	0
Dane O'Neill	23 August 2010	23 August 2010	1	0
Chris Catlin	6 September 2010	6 September 2010	1	0
Russ Kennemore	13 November 2010	7 February 2011	6	0
Richard Kingscote	2 March 2011	12 December 2011	6	1
Simon Pearce	19 April 2011	19 April 2011	1	0
Hayley Turner	30 June 2011	12 July 2011	2	1
Cathy Gannon	12 September 2011	12 September 2011	1	0

== Pedigree ==
Pedigree of The Tatling (IRE), bay or brown gelding, 1997
Sire Perugino (USA) 1991	Danzig (USA); 1977	Northern Dancer	Nearctic
Sire Perugino (USA) 1991	Danzig (USA); 1977	Northern Dancer	Natalma
Sire Perugino (USA) 1991	Danzig (USA); 1977	Pas de Nom	Admiral's Voyage
Sire Perugino (USA) 1991	Danzig (USA); 1977	Pas de Nom	Petitioner
Sire Perugino (USA) 1991	Fairy Bridge (USA); 1975	Bold Reason	Hail To Reason
Sire Perugino (USA) 1991	Fairy Bridge (USA); 1975	Bold Reason	Lalun
Sire Perugino (USA) 1991	Fairy Bridge (USA); 1975	Special	Forli
Sire Perugino (USA) 1991	Fairy Bridge (USA); 1975	Special	Thong
Dam Aunty Eileen (IRE) 1983	Ahonoora (GB); 1975	Lorenzaccio	Klairon
Dam Aunty Eileen (IRE) 1983	Ahonoora (GB); 1975	Lorenzaccio	Phoenissa
Dam Aunty Eileen (IRE) 1983	Ahonoora (GB); 1975	Helen Nichols	Martial
Dam Aunty Eileen (IRE) 1983	Ahonoora (GB); 1975	Helen Nichols	Quaker Girl
Dam Aunty Eileen (IRE) 1983	Safe Haven (GB); 1974	Blakeney	Hethersett
Dam Aunty Eileen (IRE) 1983	Safe Haven (GB); 1974	Blakeney	Windmill Girl
Dam Aunty Eileen (IRE) 1983	Safe Haven (GB); 1974	Amazer	Mincio
Dam Aunty Eileen (IRE) 1983	Safe Haven (GB); 1974	Amazer	Alzara (Family: 1-k)
