= Mecca's Angel =

Irish-bred Thoroughbred racehorse

- Racing silks of David Metcalfe
- Sire: Dark Angel
- Grandsire: Acclamation
- Dam: Folga
- Damsire: Atraf
- Sex: Mare
- Foaled: 11 February 2011
- Country: Ireland
- Colour: Grey
- Breeder: Yeomanstown Stud & Doc Bloodstock
- Owner: David Metcalfe
- Trainer: Michael Dods
- Record: 20: 10-4-1
- Earnings: £679,941

Major wins
- Scarbrough Stakes (2014); World Trophy (2014); Prix de Saint-Georges (2015); Nunthorpe Stakes (2015, 2016); Sapphire Stakes (2016)

Awards
- World's top-rated female sprinter (2015, 2016)

Mecca's Angel (foaled 11 February 2011) is an Irish-bred, British-trained Thoroughbred racehorse. She was a specialist sprinter who excelled over the minimum distance of five furlongs. She showed promise as a two-year-old in 2013, winning two minor contests and twice finishing second in Listed races. In the following year she improved to win four of her five races including the Scarbrough Stakes and World Trophy. As a four-year-old she made only three appearances but was rated the best female sprinter in the world after wins in the Prix de Saint-Georges and the Nunthorpe Stakes. In 2016 she struggled for form in the spring but then won the Sapphire Stakes before becoming the first horse in over thirty years to win a second consecutive Nunthorpe Stakes at York.

== Background ==
Mecca's Angel is a grey mare bred in Ireland by Yeomanstown Stud & Doc Bloodstock. In October 2012 the yearling filly was sent to the Tattersalls sales and was bought for 16,000 guineas by the trainer Michael Dods. The filly entered the ownership of David Metcalfe and was trained by Dods at Denton, County Durham. She was ridden in most of her races by Paul Mulrennan. The Angel part of her name came from her sire Dark Angel, from whom she inherited her grey colour whilst Mecca is David Metcalfe's nickname.

Dark Angel won four races including the Mill Reef Stakes and the Middle Park Stakes as a two-year-old in 2007 before beginning his stud career in the following year. Dark Angel's other offspring have included Lethal Force, Gabrial (Lincoln Handicap), Estidhkaar (Champagne Stakes) and Bronze Angel (Cambridgeshire Handicap). Mecca's Angel's dam Folga, a daughter of the Prix d'Arenberg winner Desert Dawn, was a durable sprinter who won six minor races from thirty-five starts between 2004 and 2007. As a broodmare, Folga has also produced Markaz (also by Dark Angel), the winner of the Criterion Stakes and the Chipchase Stakes.

== Racing career ==
=== 2013: two-year-old season ===
After finishing fourth on her racecourse debut at Thirsk Racecourse in May, Mecca's Angel recorded her first success in a maiden race over five furlongs at Haydock Park on 22 June. The filly's next appearance came in a nursery (a handicap race restricted to two-year-olds) on the fibresand surface Southwell Racecourse on 9 July. Carrying top weight of 133 pounds she took the lead soon after the start and drew away from her six opponents to win by twelve lengths. In her three remaining races Mecca's Angel was moved up to Listed class. She finished second to Hot Streak (later to win the Cornwallis Stakes and the Temple Stakes) in Roses Stakes at York in August, second to Hurryupharriet in the Harry Rosebery Stakes at Ayr in September and fourth to Ventura Mist in the Two-Year-Old Trophy over six furlongs at Redcar on 5 October. The Redcar race remains the only time that Mecca's Angel has raced over a distance beyond five and a half furlongs.

=== 2014: three-year-old season ===
Mecca's Angel began her second season in a minor handicap race at Thirsk on 12 April and won by four and a half lengths under 133 pounds. On 4 May she started 10/11 favourite for the Tangerine Trees Stakes at Hamilton Racecourse. She took the lead approaching the final furlong and accelerated away from her rivals to win by eight lengths. Eight days later she was sent to France for the Listed Prix Texanita over 1100 metres at Maisons-Laffitte and sustained her only defeat of the season as she finished fifth behind Rangali.

After a break of almost four months, Mecca's Angel returned in the Listed Scarbrough Stakes at Doncaster Racecourse on 10 September and started the 7/1 third favourite behind Reckless Abandon and Steps (Achilles Stakes) in an eleven-runner field. After racing close behind the leaders she took the lead approaching the final furlong and won by two and a quarter lengths from Reckless Abandon. Paul Mulrennan described the winner as "a very smart filly". Ten days after her win at Doncaster Mecca's Angel was moved up to Group race class for the first time when she started 13/8 favourite for the World Trophy at Newbury. The most fancied of her rivals was the King George Stakes winner Take Cover, whilst the other seven runners included Justice Day (third in the Middle Park Stakes), Dinkum Diamond (Cammidge Trophy) and Scream Blue Murder (Phoenix Sprint Stakes). After racing in second place Mecca's Angel took the lead two furlongs out, accelerated clear in the closing stages and won by two and a half lengths from Justice Day.

=== 2015: four-year-old season ===
On her first appearance as a four-year-old, Mecca's Angel was sent to France for the Prix de Saint-Georges over 1000 metres at Longchamp Racecourse on 10 May. She started the 4/1 second favourite behind Catcall, a six-year-old gelding who had won the race in 2013 and 2014. Also in the field were Hot Streak, Maarek (Prix de l'Abbaye), Mirza (Prix du Petit Couvert) and Spirit Quartz (Prix du Gros Chêne). Mecca's Angel was among the leaders from the start and won "comfortably" by two lengths from Robert Le Diable. At the Curragh in July, the filly started odds-on favourite for the Sapphire Stakes but was beaten a neck by the six-year-old gelding Stepper Point. Dods was later to say that the ground in Ireland had been too firm for the filly to produce her best form.

On 21 August Mecca's Angel was stepped up to Group One level for the first time for the Nunthorpe Stakes at York and started the 15/2 third favourite behind the American-trained two-year-old filly Acapulco and the King George Stakes winner Muthmir. Acapulco had easily defeated the Dods-trained Easton Angel when easily winning the Queen Mary Stakes. Stepper Point and Justice Day were again in opposition with the other fourteen runners included Sole Power, Goldream, Mattmu (Critérium de Maisons-Laffitte), Pearl Secret (Temple Stakes) and Move In Time (Prix de l'Abbaye). Mecca's Angel tracked the leaders down the centre of the course before making rapid progress in the final furlong. She moved into second place behind Acapulco before overtaking the America filly fifty yards from the finish and won by two lengths. Mattmu finished third ahead of Sole Power and Goldream. Interviewed after the race, Michael Dods said "It's marvellous for the north and everyone involved and it’s great to beat the Americans."

=== 2016: five-year-old season ===
On her first appearance in nine months, Mecca's Angel started favourite for the Temple Stakes at Haydock on 21 May. She disputed the lead from the start and went to the front a furlong out but was carried left and bumped by the four-year-old colt Profitable before being beaten a neck into second place. In the King's Stand Stakes at Royal Ascot she started 6/4 favourite but produced one of her worst performances. After being repeatedly obstructed as she attempted to obtain a clear run she was eased down by Mulrennan and finished sixteenth of the seventeen runners behind Profitable. In July the mare was dropped to Group Three class and sent to Ireland for the Sapphire Stakes at the Curragh add started 5/4 favourite ahead of five opponents including Sole Power, G Force (Haydock Sprint Cup) and Brando (Sprint Stakes). She race close behind the leaders, took the lead two furlongs out and drew away to win by three lengths from Brando. Explaining the mare's improvement from her previous start, Dods said that Mecca's Angle had been in season at Ascot as well as being unsuited by the ground conditions.

On 19 August Mecca's Angel attempted to become the first horse to win back-to-back runnings of the Nunthorpe Stakes at York since Sharpo recorded his third consecutive success in 1982 (Borderlescott had won the race in 2008 and 2009 but the first of his victories came when the race was run at Newmarket). In a nineteen-runner field she started second favourite behind Limato, a four-year-old gelding who had won the July Cup on his previous start. The other runners included Profitable, Sole Power, Goldream, Brando, Pearl Secret, Take Cover (King George Stakes) and Danzeno (Chipchase Stakes). Mecca's Angel was among the leaders from the start before taking the lead in the last quarter mile. She kept on strongly in the closing stages and won by two lengths from Limato with Take Cover another two lengths back in third. After the race Mulrennan admitted "I’d love to say she's complicated and I have to do this and that, but I just have to point her. At the two pole, I said ‘go’, and she did." Dods, discussing the mare's future, said "At her age, it's not fair to race her next year and she’ll be sold to go to stud. I’ll be keen to try her over six before she retires. There's the sprint at Ascot on Champions Day and also the Abbaye."

On 2 October Mecca's Angel started the 1.7/1 favourite for the Prix de l'Abbaye over 1000 metres at Chantilly Racecourse. After chasing the leader she took the lead in the closing stages but was overtaken 75 metres out and finished third, beaten three-quarters of a length and a short head by Marsha and Washington, D.C. In the British Champions Sprint Stakes two weeks later she started at odds of 8/1 in a thirteen-runner field. Racing over six furlongs for the first time in more than three years she tracked the leaders on the stands-side but faded in the last quarter mile and finished twelfth behind The Tin Man, beaten thirteen lengths by the winner.

== Assessment ==
In the 2015 edition of the World's Best Racehorse Rankings Mecca's Angel was assigned a rating of 120, making her the world's leading female sprinter and the 42nd best racehorse in the world of any age or sex.

== Pedigree ==
Pedigree of Mecca's Angel (IRE), grey mare, 2011
Sire Dark Angel (IRE) 2005	Acclamation (GB); 1999	Royal Applause	Waajib
Sire Dark Angel (IRE) 2005	Acclamation (GB); 1999	Royal Applause	Flying Melody
Sire Dark Angel (IRE) 2005	Acclamation (GB); 1999	Princess Athena	Ahonoora
Sire Dark Angel (IRE) 2005	Acclamation (GB); 1999	Princess Athena	Shopping Wise
Sire Dark Angel (IRE) 2005	Midnight Angel (GB); 1994	Machiavellian	Mr. Prospector
Sire Dark Angel (IRE) 2005	Midnight Angel (GB); 1994	Machiavellian	Coup de Folie
Sire Dark Angel (IRE) 2005	Midnight Angel (GB); 1994	Night at Sea	Night Shift
Sire Dark Angel (IRE) 2005	Midnight Angel (GB); 1994	Night at Sea	Into Harbour
Dam Folga (GB) 2002	Atraf (GB); 1993	Clantime	Music Boy
Dam Folga (GB) 2002	Atraf (GB); 1993	Clantime	Penny Pincher
Dam Folga (GB) 2002	Atraf (GB); 1993	Flitteriss Park	Beldale Flutter
Dam Folga (GB) 2002	Atraf (GB); 1993	Flitteriss Park	Geopelia
Dam Folga (GB) 2002	Desert Dawn (GB); 1986	Belfort	Tyrant
Dam Folga (GB) 2002	Desert Dawn (GB); 1986	Belfort	Belle de Retz
Dam Folga (GB) 2002	Desert Dawn (GB); 1986	Cast Pearls	Cutlass
Dam Folga (GB) 2002	Desert Dawn (GB); 1986	Cast Pearls	My Girl Pearl (Family:2-o)
