= Winter Power =

Irish-bred Thoroughbred racehorse

- Racing silks of King Power Racing
- Sire: Bungle Inthejungle
- Grandsire: Exceed And Excel
- Dam: Titian Dream
- Damsire: Titus Livius
- Sex: Filly
- Foaled: 16 March 2018
- Country: Ireland
- Colour: Bay
- Breeder: Newlands House Stud
- Owner: King Power Racing
- Trainer: Tim Easterby
- Record: 13: 7-0-2
- Earnings: £336,056

Major wins
- Harry Rosebery Stakes (2020); Cornwallis Stakes (2020); Westow Stakes (2021); City Walls Stakes (2021); Nunthorpe Stakes (2021)

Winter Power (foaled 16 March 2018) is an Irish-bred, British-trained Thoroughbred racehorse. She is a specialist sprinter who has raced exclusively over the minimum distance of five furlongs. As a two-year-old in 2020 she won four of her nine races including the Listed Harry Rosebery Stakes and the Group 3 Cornwallis Stakes. In the following season she won the Westow Stakes, City Walls Stakes and Nunthorpe Stakes.

== Background ==
Winter Power is a bay filly with a white star and two white socks bred in Ireland by the County Kildare-based Newlands House Stud. As a yearling in October 2019 she was consigned to the Goffs Orby Sale and was bought for €90,000 by the bloodstock agents SackvilleDonald. She passed into the ownership of King Power Racing and was sent into training with Tim Easterby at Great Habton in North Yorkshire. She has been ridden in most of her races by Silvestre de Sousa.

She was from the third crop of foals sired by Bungle Inthejungle, a sprinter who won the Molecomb Stakes and the Cornwallis Stakes as a two-year-old in 2012. His other foals have included the Lowther Stakes winner Living In The Past and the Molecomb Stakes winner Rumble Inthejungle. Winter Power's dam Titian Saga showed very modest racing ability, winning one minor race from 21 starts. She was a female-line descendant of the British broodmare Trustworthy, making her a distant relative of Lady's Secret.

== Racing career ==
=== 2020: two-year-old season ===
The 2020 flat racing season in Britain was disrupted by the COVID-19 pandemic and Winter Power did not make her racecourse debut until 2 June, when she started 13/8 favourite for a maiden race over five furlongs on the synthetic Tapeta track at Newcastle Racecourse and finished third behind Pelekai, beaten one and a half lengths by the winner. Ten days later she started favourite for a maiden on the same surface at Wolverhampton Racecourse but after leading for most of the way she faded in the closing stages and came home third behind Jojo Rabbit and Plum Run. The filly ran for the first time on turf in a nursery (a handicap race for juveniles) at Redcar Racecourse on 27 July and recorded her first success as she won in a "canter" by five lengths carrying top weight of 135 pounds. The filly was back on the track three days later and started favourite for a nursery at Goodwood Racecourse but finished fourth of the eight runners behind Acklam Express. When stepped up to Listed class for her next appearance the filly came home sixth behind Acklam Express in the Roses Stakes at York Racecourse on 22 August. Two weeks later Winter Power started favourite for a novice race (for horses with no more than two previous wins) at Redcar Racecourse and won by a length from Risk of Thunder after taking the lead inside the final furlong. The filly was then stepped up in class for the Group 2 Flying Childers Stakes at Doncaster Racecourse on 11 September but ran poorly and came home last of the ten runners behind Ubettabelieveit.

A week after her disappointing effort at Doncaster Winter Power was ridden by David Allan when she started at odds of 7/1 for the Listed Harry Rosebery Stakes at Ayr Racecourse. She was in contention from the start, gained the advantage approaching the final furlong, and stayed on well to win by half a length from the colt Nomadic Empire. After the race Tim Easterby commented "She’s a very good filly... she’s got a fantastic attitude. You can back her up and run her quick. It’s not very often you can do that with a filly."

For her final appearance of the season Winter Power was sent to Newmarket Racecourse for the Group 3 Cornwallis Stakes on 9 October and went off the 10/1 sixth choice in the betting behind Method (Rose Bowl Stakes), Bahrain Pride (Ripon Champion Two Years Old Trophy), Acklam Express, Atalis Bay and Royal Address (Criterium de Vitesse). She disputed the early lead with Atalis Bay before taking command at half way and drew away in the closing stages to win "comfortably" to win by three lengths from Method. Silvestre de Sousa said: "She won quite well at Ayr and has bounced back in great form. She has done really well and won very easily... when I asked her the question coming down the dip she handled it well and put the race to bed very nicely... I think when she fills up over the winter she might just strengthen up."

=== 2021: three-year-old season ===
Winter Power began her second campaign in the Listed Westow Stakes on 13 May at York when she started the 5/1 second favourite behind Acklam Express in an eight-runner field. The filly went to the front from the start and was never seriously challenged, winning in impressive style by three lengths from Atalis Bay. Easterby said "She's a natural. She's so relaxed. She's always been able to gallop but it’s just taken a while to get it all right. She's a good-sized filly now, she's really grown and she's done well and filled out. She's just a professional and you get a good horse like that every once in a while. Pipalong was the same and they hardly blow after their races these good horses. She'd be as good as any that I've had in a while."

On 15 June at Royal Ascot Winter Power was moved up to Group 1 class for the first time for the King's Stand Stakes but after being in contention for most of the way she faded in the closing stages and came home ninth of the sixteen runners behind the five-year-old gelding Oxted. The filly was dropped back to Listed class for the City Walls Stakes at York on 10 July and started the 9/4 favourite ahead of nine opponents including Que Amoro (Land O'Burns Fillies' Stakes), El Astronaute (Achilles Stakes), Tarboosh (Scarbrough Stakes), Dakota Gold (Bengough Stakes) and Urban Beat (Mercury Stakes). With Allan in the saddle, Winter Power disputed the lead from the start, broke away from her opponents approaching the final furlong and kept on well to win by a length and a neck from Moss Gill and Urban Beat. After the race Easterby commented "That was pretty impressive. David said he wasn’t in control of her, she was going too quick. She’s got to get settled, if she doesn’t settle she won’t get home."

Winter Power returned to Group 1 class on 20 August at York in the Nunthorpe Stakes when she was ridden by De Sousa and started at odds of 9/1 in a fourteen-runner field. The French challenger Suesa (winner of the King George Stakes) started favourite while the other contenders included Golden Pal from the United States (winner of the Breeders' Cup Juvenile Turf Sprint), Dragon Symbol, Chipotle (Windsor Castle Stakes), Chil Chil (Chipchase Stakes), Que Amoro, Dakota Gold and Ubettebelieveit. Winter Power started quickly and settled in second place behind Golden Pal before going to the front two furlongs out. She kept on well in the closing stages and won by a length and a quarter from the 40/1 outsider Emaraaty Ana with Dragon Symbol half a length away in third. Easterby said "She's just brilliant. She's a machine, she's a superstar, and she's also just right now. It took a long time to get her there. Some horses need a bit of time to come to themselves. When they have ability like she does, you have to be patient. You must not train her hard, either. The hardest thing about training a horse like her is not really training her."

== Pedigree ==
Pedigree of Winter Power (IRE), bay filly, 2018
Sire Bungle Inthejungle (GB) 2010	Exceed And Excel (AUS); 2000	Danehill (USA)	Danzig
Sire Bungle Inthejungle (GB) 2010	Exceed And Excel (AUS); 2000	Danehill (USA)	Razyana
Sire Bungle Inthejungle (GB) 2010	Exceed And Excel (AUS); 2000	Patrona (USA)	Lomond
Sire Bungle Inthejungle (GB) 2010	Exceed And Excel (AUS); 2000	Patrona (USA)	Gladiolus
Sire Bungle Inthejungle (GB) 2010	License To Thrill (GB); 1997	Wolfhound (USA)	Nureyev
Sire Bungle Inthejungle (GB) 2010	License To Thrill (GB); 1997	Wolfhound (USA)	Lassie Dear
Sire Bungle Inthejungle (GB) 2010	License To Thrill (GB); 1997	Crime of Passion	Dragonara Palace (USA)
Sire Bungle Inthejungle (GB) 2010	License To Thrill (GB); 1997	Crime of Passion	Catriona
Dam Titian Saga (IRE) 2003	Titus Livius (FR) (IRE); 1993	Machiavellian (USA)	Mr Prospector
Dam Titian Saga (IRE) 2003	Titus Livius (FR) (IRE); 1993	Machiavellian (USA)	Coup de Folie
Dam Titian Saga (IRE) 2003	Titus Livius (FR) (IRE); 1993	Party Doll (GB)	Be My Guest (USA)
Dam Titian Saga (IRE) 2003	Titus Livius (FR) (IRE); 1993	Party Doll (GB)	Midnight Lady (FR)
Dam Titian Saga (IRE) 2003	Nordic Living (IRE); 1991	Nordico (USA)	Northern Dancer (CAN)
Dam Titian Saga (IRE) 2003	Nordic Living (IRE); 1991	Nordico (USA)	Kennelot
Dam Titian Saga (IRE) 2003	Nordic Living (IRE); 1991	To Die For (USA)	Diesis (GB)
Dam Titian Saga (IRE) 2003	Nordic Living (IRE); 1991	To Die For (USA)	Bally Knockan (Family: 22-d)
