= Marsha (horse) =

Irish-bred Thoroughbred racehorse

- Racing silks of Elite Racing Club
- Sire: Acclamation
- Grandsire: Royal Applause
- Dam: Marlinka
- Damsire: Marju
- Sex: Mare
- Foaled: 16 March 2013
- Country: Ireland
- Colour: Bay
- Breeder: Elite Racing Club
- Owner: Elite Racing Club
- Trainer: Mark Prescott
- Record: 18: 7-5-3
- Earnings: £650,114

Major wins
- Land O'Burns Fillies' Stakes (2016); City Walls Stakes (2016); Prix de l'Abbaye (2016); Palace House Stakes (2017); Nunthorpe Stakes (2017)

Marsha (16 March 2013 – 2023) was an Irish-bred, British-trained Thoroughbred racehorse and broodmare. She was a specialist sprinter, all but one of whose victories came over the minimum distance of five furlongs (1000 metres). After winning two minor races as a juvenile in 2015, she made progress throughout the following year, taking the Land O'Burns Fillies' Stakes and the City Walls Stakes before ending her season with a win in the Prix de l'Abbaye. In 2017 she added wins in the Palace House Stakes and the Nunthorpe Stakes and was sold at the end of the year for a record price of 6,000,000 guineas.

== Background ==
Marsha was a bay mare with a small white star bred and owned by Elite Racing Club. She was trained in Newmarket, Suffolk by Sir Mark Prescott and ridden in most of her races by Luke Morris.

She was sired by Acclamation, a high-class sprinter who won the Diadem Stakes in 2003 and whose other progeny have included Dark Angel and Equiano. Marsha's dam Marlinka raced only as a two-year-old in 2010, showing considerable ability as she won three races including the Listed Prix des Reves d'Or over 1000 metres at Vichy. Marlinka's dam Baralinka was a half sister to Soviet Song and a distant relative of L'Attrayante.

== Racing career ==
=== 2015: two-year-old season ===
Marsha began her racing career on 4 September in maiden race over six furlongs on the polytrack surface at Kempton Park Racecourse when she started at odds of 9/1 and finished second, beaten a length by Zhui Feng. Two weeks later, she recorded her first success in a maiden at Catterick Racecourse, taking the lead two furlong out and beating The Full Bloom by half length. For her last two races of the year the filly was sent to race on the polytrack at Dundalk Racecourse. On 9 October she started 8/15 favourite for a race over five furlongs and won "comfortably" by three and a quarter lengths from Go Kart. Two weeks later she was matched against older horses in the Listed Mercury Stakes and finished third behind the eight-year-old gelding Take Cover.

=== 2016: three-year-old season ===
Marsha began her second season in a handicap race over six furlongs at Newmarket Racecourse on 14 May in which she carried 126 pounds and finished second, beaten half a length by Show Stealer. When stepped up in class for the Group 3 Ballyogan Stakes at the Curragh she came home fifth of the nine runners, six and a half lengths behind the winner Divine. Two weeks after her defeat in Ireland the filly started 7/4 favourite for the Land O'Burns Fillies' Stakes over five furlongs at Ayr Racecourse. Ridden by Paul Mulrennan she pulled hard in the early stages before taking the lead inside the final furlong and winning "very readily" by two and a half length from Fine Blend.

On 9 July at York Racecourse Marsha started 5/1 second choice in the betting behind the six-year-old Muthmir (winner of the 2015 King George Stakes) in the City Walls Stakes. She recovered from a poor start to gain the advantage in the final strides and win by a neck from Easton Angel. In the King George Stakes at Goodwood at the end of July she came home fifth in a blanket finish, beaten less than a length by the winner Take Cover. In September she was sent to France and finished second to the gelding Just Glamorous in the Prix du Petit Couvert over 1000 metres at Chantilly Racecourse.

With Longchamp Racecourse closed for redevelopment the 2016 edition of the Prix de l'Abbaye was run over 1000 metres at Chantilly on 2 October. Marsha was made a 16/1 outsider while Mecca's Angel started 6/4 favourite in a seventeen-runner field. The other runners included Maarek (winner of the race in 2013), Profitable (King's Stand Stakes), Just Glamorous, Take Cover, Goldream, Ardad (Flying Childers Stakes), Cotai Glory (Molecomb Stakes) and the Aidan O'Brien-trained Washington DC. Just Glamorous set the pace before giving way to Mecca's Angel 300 metres from the finish at which point Marsha, who had been settled in mid-division, began to make rapid progress. Marsha caught Mecca's Angel well inside the last 100 metres and held off the fast-finishing Washington DC to win by three quarters of a length.

=== 2017: four-year-old season ===
On her first run of 2017, Marsha, as a Group 1 winner, was required to carry a seven-pound weight penalty in the Palace House Stakes at Newmarket on 6 May and started the 8/1 fourth choice in the betting behind Washington, D.C., Priceless and Muthmir. After being restrained by Morris towards the rear, she accelerated into the lead and kept on "gamely" to win by a neck and a length from Washington, D.C. and Goldream.

In the King's Stand Stakes at Royal Ascot in June Marsha started favourite, but proved no match for the American filly Lady Aurelia, who won easily, and lost second place by a head to Profitable. Marsha was expected to return to winning form in the Sapphire Stakes at the Curragh in July and started the 1/2 favourite, but after taking the lead a furlong out she was caught on the line and beaten a short head by the eight-year-old gelding Caspian Prince. On 4 August she ran for the second time in the King George Stakes, but after experiencing some difficulty obtaining a clear run she came home third behind Battaash and Profitable.

The Nunthorpe Stakes at York on 25 August attracted a field of eleven, and saw Marsha start at odds of 8/1. Lady Aurelia (ridden by Frankie Dettori) was made the odds-on favourite ahead of Battaash, while the other runners included Profitable, Washington DC, Priceless, Take Cover, Cotai Glory and Goldream. Lady Aurelia set off in front with Marsha being settled behind the leaders before making a forward move in the last quarter mile. Approaching the final furlong the race looked to be devolving into a three-way struggle between Lady Aurelia racing down the centre of the track, Battaash on the leader's right and Marsha racing up the stands-side rail. Battaash dropped from contention and the two fillies crossed the line together resulting in a photo finish. Dettori celebrated his presumed victory by punching the air and waving his whip to the crowd but the judge's decision was that Marsha had prevailed by a nose.

At Chantilly in October, Marsha attempted to repeat her 2016 success in the Prix de l'Abbaye. After racing at the rear of the field she made rapid progress in the closing stages, but was never able to pose a threat to Battaash and was beaten four lengths into second place. On her final racecourse appearance, the filly was sent to the United States to contest the Breeders' Cup Turf Sprint at Del Mar Racetrack on 4 November and finished sixth of the twelve runners behind the 40/1 outsider Stormy Liberal.

At the Tattersalls December mares sale on 5 December 2017 Marsha was put up for auction and was sold for a European record price of 6,000,000 guineas to Michael Magnier of the Coolmore Stud after a lengthy bidding duel with John Gosden.

== Breeding record ==
Marsha produced her first foal, a filly sired by Galileo, in January 2020. In 2022 and 2023 she produced foals by Frankel (a filly and a colt). She died aged ten in 2023.

== Pedigree ==
Pedigree of Marsha (IRE), bay mare, 2013
Sire Acclamation (GB) 1999	Royal Applause (GB); 1993	Waajib	Try My Best
Sire Acclamation (GB) 1999	Royal Applause (GB); 1993	Waajib	Corvana
Sire Acclamation (GB) 1999	Royal Applause (GB); 1993	Flying Melody	Auction Ring
Sire Acclamation (GB) 1999	Royal Applause (GB); 1993	Flying Melody	Whispering Star
Sire Acclamation (GB) 1999	Princess Athena (IRE); 1985	Ahonoora	Lorenzaccio
Sire Acclamation (GB) 1999	Princess Athena (IRE); 1985	Ahonoora	Helen Nichols
Sire Acclamation (GB) 1999	Princess Athena (IRE); 1985	Shopping Wise	Floribunda
Sire Acclamation (GB) 1999	Princess Athena (IRE); 1985	Shopping Wise	Sea Melody
Dam Marlinka (GB) 2008	Marju (IRE); 1988	Last Tycoon	Try My Best
Dam Marlinka (GB) 2008	Marju (IRE); 1988	Last Tycoon	Mill Princess
Dam Marlinka (GB) 2008	Marju (IRE); 1988	Flame of Tara	Artaius
Dam Marlinka (GB) 2008	Marju (IRE); 1988	Flame of Tara	Welsh Flame
Dam Marlinka (GB) 2008	Baralinka (IRE); 1999	Barathea	Sadler's Wells
Dam Marlinka (GB) 2008	Baralinka (IRE); 1999	Barathea	Brocade
Dam Marlinka (GB) 2008	Baralinka (IRE); 1999	Kalinka	Soviet Star
Dam Marlinka (GB) 2008	Baralinka (IRE); 1999	Kalinka	Tralthee (Family: 20-a)
