= Daisy Warwick Stakes =

Flat horse race in Britain

- Class: Listed
- Location: Goodwood Racecourse; W. Sussex, England
- Inaugurated: 2011
- Race type: Flat / Thoroughbred
- Sponsor: British Stallion Studs
- Website: Goodwood

Race information
- Distance: 1m 3f 218y (2,412 metres)
- Surface: Turf
- Track: Right-handed
- Qualification: Four-years-old and up fillies and mares
- Weight: 9 st 2 lb Penalties; 7 lb for Group 1 or Group 2 winners * 5 lb for Group 3 winners * 3 lb for Listed winner * * after 31 August 2024
- Purse: £60,000 (2025); 1st: £34,026

Daisy Warwick Stakes
2026
Tattycoram	Coedana	Incensed

Previous years
2025
Shaha	Scenic	Loughville
2024
Gather Ye Rosebuds	Queen Of The Pride	Sea Of Roses
2023
Luisa Casati	Time Lock	Ching Shih
2022
Bartzella	Lady Hayes	Silence Please
2021
Alpinista	Makawee	Oriental Mystique

2020-2011
2019
Enbihaar	Klassique	Mazzuri
2018
Isabel De Urbina	Titi Makfi	Mam'selle
2017
Ajman Princess	Elysian Fields	Dance The Dream
2016
Carnachy	Bateel	Twitch
2015
Miss Marjurie	Dream Child	Arabian Comet
2014
Special Meaning	Noble Protector	Freedom's Light
2013
Khione	Jehannedarc	Souviens Toi
2012
Vita Nova	Shimmering Surf	Creme Anglaise
2011
Gertrude Bell	Polly's Mark	Pink Symphony

The Daisy Warwick Stakes is a Listed flat horse race in Great Britain open to mares and fillies aged four years or older. It is run at Goodwood Racecourse over a distance of 1 mile 3 furlongs and 218 yards (2,412 metres), and it is scheduled to take place each year in late April or early May.

The race was run for the first time in 2011.

== Records ==
Most successful horse:

- no horse has won this race more than once

Leading jockey:

- no jockey has won this race more than once

Leading trainer (3 wins):

- John Gosden - Getrude Bell (2011), Enbihaar (2019), Shaha (2025)

== Winners ==
Year	Winner	Age	Jockey	Trainer	Time
2011	Gertrude Bell	4	Nicky Mackay	John Gosden	2:34.76
2012	Vita Nova	5	Ian Mongan	Sir Henry Cecil	2:50.46
2013	Khione	4	Kieren Fallon	Luca Cumani	2:39.40
2014	Special Meaning	4	Franny Norton	Mark Johnston	2:43.11
2015	Miss Marjurie	5	Shane Kelly	Denis Coakley	2:36.01
2016	Carnachy	4	Sean Levey	David Simcock	2:40.58
2017	Ajman Princess	4	Fran Berry	Roger Varian	2:34.75
2018	Isabel De Urbina	4	Harry Bentley	Ralph Beckett	2:45.35
2019	Enbihaar	4	Dane O'Neill	John Gosden	2:40.44
	no race 2020 (Note: The 2020 running was cancelled because of the COVID-19 pandemic in the United Kingdom)
2021	Alpinista	4	Luke Morris	Sir Mark Prescott	2:39.27
2022	Bartzella	4	Tom Marquand	William Haggas	2:39.48
2023	Luisa Casati	5	Richard Kingscote	Tom Ward	2:43.69
2024	Gather Ye Rosebuds	4	Ronan Whelan	Jack Channon	2:44.40
2025	Shaha	4	Kieran Shoemark	John & Thady Gosden	2:37.10
2026	Tattycoram	4	Edward Greatrex	Ralph Beckett	2:41.76

== See also ==
- Horse racing in Great Britain
- List of British flat horse races
