= Paul Mulrennan =

English jockey

Personal information
- Occupation: Jockey

Horse racing career
- Sport: Horse racing

Major racing wins
- Nunthorpe Stakes (2015, 2016)

Significant horses
- Mecca's Angel
- Updated on 20 October 2023

Paul Mulrennan is an English flat racing jockey, whose biggest victories to date have been back to back wins on Mecca's Angel in the Group 1 Nunthorpe Stakes in 2015 and 2016. He also won six times on another sprinter Mabs Cross. Both were trained by Michael Dods.

In his schooldays, he hoped for a career in Gaelic football, but his careers adviser suggested he was too short and should consider becoming a jockey instead. He started race riding in 2000 and rode out his apprentice claim in 2004.

His first big early successes came on the Mick Easterby-trained Gentleman's Deal, on whom he won the Ladybird Stakes, Group 3 Winter Derby and Quebec Stakes in 2007. Other big race victories then came on Dandino in the 2011 Jockey Club Stakes, Melody of Love in the 2012 Firth of Clyde Stakes and Moviesta in the 2013 King George Stakes, before his partnership with Mecca's Angel throughout 2015 and 2016 brought him the Group 2 Sapphire Stakes, Group 3 Prix de Saint-Georges, Group 3 World Trophy and Listed Scarbrough Stakes as well as two Nunthorpes. Easton Angel was another successful horse for him in 2016 winning both the Westow Stakes and Scurry Stakes. Mabs Cross won two Palace House Stakes for him.

In both 2014 and 2016, he rode more than 100 winners, but seriously injured his back in a fall on the gallops in 2018 and dropped to 43 winners in that year, before reaching a new peak of 108 winners in 2022. In 2020, he won the Land O'Burns Fillies' Stakes and was second in another Nunthorpe on Que Amora, losing out to Battaash, and across 2020 and 2021 he won three Group 3s including the Brigadier Gerard Stakes on the Jim Goldie-trained Euchen Glen. Azure Blue, another Michael Dods horse, gave him Listed and Group 2 success in 2023.

As of 2023, he had ridden nearly 1400 winners.

Mulrennan is married to the former jockey and Racing TV and ITV presenter Adele Mulrennan.

== Major wins ==
(United Kingdom) Great Britain

- King Charles III Stakes - (1) - American Affair (2025)
- Nunthorpe Stakes - (2) - Mecca's Angel (2015, 2016)

== See also ==
- List of jockeys
