= World Trophy =

Flat horse race in Britain

- Class: Group 3
- Location: Newbury Racecourse; Newbury, England
- Race type: Flat / Thoroughbred
- Sponsor: Dubai International Airport
- Website: Newbury

Race information
- Distance: 5f 34y (1,037 metres)
- Surface: Turf
- Track: Straight
- Qualification: Three-years-old and up
- Weight: 9 st 2 lb (3yo); 9 st 3 lb (4yo+); Allowances; 3 lb for fillies and mares Penalties; 7 lb for Group 1 winners * 5 lb for Group 2 winners * 3 lb for Group 3 winners * * after 31 March
- Purse: £85,000 (2025); 1st: £48,204

World Trophy
2026
Miss Yechance	Shagraan	Diligent Harry

Previous years
2025
First Instinct	Shagraan	Montassib
2024
No Half Measures	Relief Rally	Annaf
2023
Thunderbear	Nymphadora	Sense Of Duty
2022
Mitbaahy	Teresa Mendoza	Manaccan
2021
Hurricane Ivor	Moss Gill	Tis Marvellous

2020-2011
2020
Lazuli	Tis Marvellous	Equilateral
2019
Maid In India	Dakota Gold	Hit The Bid
2018
Mr Lupton	Take Cover	Rebel Streak
2017
Take Cover	Cotai Glory	Muthmir
2016
Cotai Glory	Alpha Delphini	Ridge Ranger
2015
Steps	Ridge Ranger	Justice Day
2014
Mecca's Angel	Justice Day	Ajjaadd
2013
Maarek	York Glory	Kingsgate Native
2012
Swiss Spirit	Kingsgate Native	Taajub
2011
Deacon Blues	Masamah	Dinkum Diamond

2010-2001
2010
Astrophysical Jet	Golden Destiny	Prohibit
2009
Strike The Deal	Total Gallery	J J The Jet Plane
2008
Moorhouse Lad	Wi Dud	Toms Laughter
2007
Rowe Park	Enticing	Judd Street
2006
Dixie Belle	Excusez Moi	Dandy Man
2005
The Tatling	Majestic Missile	Boogie Street
2004
The Tatling	Var	Airwave
2003
Ratio	Mornin Reserves	Dragon Flyer
2002
Lady Dominatrix	Smokin Beau	Agnetha
2001
The Trader	Eastern Purple	Misty Eyed

2000-1991
2000
Ivory's Joy	Eastern Purple	Andreyev
1999
Imperial Beauty	Repertory	Nuclear Debate
1998
Cathedral	Night Star	Bishops Court
1997
Eveningperformance	Dashing Blue	Bollin Joanne
1996
Struggler	Hever Golf Rose	Amazing Bay
1995
Easy Option	Katya	Sharp Prod
1994
Eveningperformance	Inherent Magic	Bells Of Longwick
1993
Surprise Offer	Gorinsky	Tuscan Dawn
1992
Wolfhound	Artistic Reef	Bells Of Longwick
1991
On Tiptoes	Duplicity	Bit Of A Lark

1990-1988
1990
Ra'A	Pharaoh's Delight	Centerland
1989
Blyton Lad	Habitancy	Shuttlecock Corner
1988
Young Hal	Margub	Breakaway

The World Trophy is a Group 3 flat horse race in Great Britain open to horses aged three years or older. It is run at Newbury over a distance of 5 furlongs and 34 yards (1,037 metres), and it is scheduled to take place each year in September.

== History ==
The event was formerly called the Marlborough Stakes, and it used to be an ungraded conditions race for three-year-olds. It was renamed in memory of Tony Stratton Smith, a racehorse-owning music entrepreneur, in 1992. The Tony Stratton Smith Memorial Stakes was opened to older horses in 1993.

The race became known as the World Trophy when Dubai Airport started a new period of sponsorship in 1997. From this point the event held Listed status, and it was promoted to Group 3 level in 2002.

== Records ==
Most successful horse (2 wins):

- Eveningperformance – 1994, 1997
- The Tatling – 2004, 2005

Leading jockey (5 wins):

- Pat Eddery – Fine Edge (1983), Moorestyle Girl (1987), Young Hal (1988), Cathedral (1998), Imperial Beauty (1999)

Leading trainer (2 wins):

- Harry Thomson Jones - Saltation (1978), Ra'A (1990)
- Henry Candy – Eveningperformance (1994, 1997)
- Milton Bradley – The Tatling (2004, 2005)
- Roger Varian - Cotai Glory (2016), Mitbaahy (2022)
- William Haggas - Hurricane Ivor (2021), First Instinct (2025)

== Winners ==
Year	Winner	Age	Jockey	Trainer	Time
1971	Fireside Chat	3	Peter Madden	Doug Marks	1:01.70
1972	Malachy	3	Ron Hutchinson	John Dunlop	1:05.93
1973	Major Bee	3	Buster Parnell	Sir Henry Nugent	1:02.23
1974	Street Light	3	Tony Kimberley	Jeremy Hindley	1:04.16
1975	Catch	3	Buster Parnell	Eddie Harty	1:03.46
1976	Minstrel	3	Greville Starkey	John Powney	1:04.81
1977	Blue Linnet	3	Geoff Lewis	Tony Ingham	1:02.64
1978	Saltation	3	Brian Rouse	Harry Thomson Jones	1:02.94
1979	Greenland Park	3	Willie Carson	William Hastings-Bass	1:03.07
1980	Blue Persian	3	Bruce Raymond	Ben Hanbury	1:01.28
1981	Long Legend	3	Lester Piggott	Henry Cecil	1:06.11
1982	Special Pleasure	3	Lester Piggott	Robert Armstrong	1:02.09
1983	Fine Edge	3	Pat Eddery	Jeremy Tree	1:05.32
1984	Susa Steel	3	Bruce Raymond	Jeremy Hindley	1:06.59
1985	Tuxford Hideaway	3	Geoff Baxter	Richard Whitaker	1:02.41
1986	Filleor	3	George Duffield	Gavin Pritchard-Gordon	1:02.16
1987	Moorestyle Girl	3	Pat Eddery	Lester Piggott	1:02.66
1988	Young Hal	3	Pat Eddery	Peter Walwyn	1:00.87
1989	Blyton Lad	3	Stuart Webster	John Balding	1:02.53
1990	Ra'A	3	Willie Carson	Harry Thomson Jones	1:02.94
1991	On Tiptoes	3	Michael Roberts	Jim Leigh	1:01.74
1992	Wolfhound	3	Steve Cauthen	John Gosden	1:02.27
1993	Surprise Offer	3	Bruce Raymond	Richard Hannon Sr.	1:03.39
1994	Eveningperformance	3	Billy Newnes	Henry Candy	1:04.54
1995	Easy Option	3	Walter Swinburn	Saeed bin Suroor	1:02.56
1996	Struggler	4	Frankie Dettori	David Loder	0:59.77
1997	Eveningperformance	6	Chris Rutter	Henry Candy	1:00.66
1998	Cathedral	4	Pat Eddery	Brian Meehan	1:00.92
1999	Imperial Beauty	3	Pat Eddery	Peter Makin	1:01.23
2000	Ivory's Joy	5	Craig Carver	Ken Ivory	1:00.33
2001	The Trader	3	Fergus Sweeney	Michael Blanshard	0:59.72
2002	Lady Dominatrix	3	Paul Doe	Nerys Dutfield	0:59.91
2003	Ratio	5	Philip Robinson	John Hammond	0:59.82
2004	The Tatling	7	Ryan Moore	Milton Bradley	1:00.68
2005	The Tatling	8	Ryan Moore	Milton Bradley	0:59.72
2006	Dixie Belle	3	Tom Queally	Mick Quinlan	1:00.16
2007	Rowe Park	4	Liam Keniry	Linda Jewell	1:00.18
2008	Moorhouse Lad	5	Jim Crowley	Bryan Smart	1:00.67
2009	Strike the Deal	4	Kieren Fallon	Jeremy Noseda	1:00.04
2010	Astrophysical Jet	3	Graham Gibbons	Ed McMahon	1:00.07
2011	Deacon Blues	4	Frankie Dettori	James Fanshawe	1:00.49
2012	Swiss Spirit	3	William Buick	David Elsworth	0:59.81
2013	Maarek	6	Declan McDonogh	Barry Lalor	1:01.04
2014	Mecca's Angel	3	Paul Mulrennan	Michael Dods	1:01.71
2015	Steps	7	Jamie Spencer	Roger Varian	1:02.40
2016	Cotai Glory	4	George Baker	Charles Hills	1:00.93
2017	Take Cover	10	David Allan	David Griffiths	0:58.79
2018	Mr Lupton	5	Gerald Mosse	Richard Fahey	1:01.64
2019	Maid In India	5	Jamie Spencer	Eric Alston	0:59.31
2020	Lazuli	3	William Buick	Charlie Appleby	0:58.40
2021	Hurricane Ivor	4	Tom Marquand	William Haggas	1:00.02
2022	Mitbaahy	3	David Egan	Roger Varian	1:00.42
2023	Thunderbear	3	Sean Levey	Jack Davison	1:04.20
2024	No Half Measures	3	Ryan Moore	Richard Hughes	1:02.03
2025	First Instinct	3	Tom Marquand	William Haggas	1:01.81
2026	Miss Yechance	3	Jack Nicholls	Karl Burke	0:59.01

== See also ==
- Horse racing in Great Britain
- List of British flat horse races
