= Quebec Stakes =

Flat horse race in Britain

Quebec Stakes
2025
Nebras	Tyrrhenian Sea	Duke's Command

Previous years
2024
Royal Champion	Tyrrhenian Sea	Auld Toon Loon
2023
Tyrrhenian Sea	Base Note	Blanchland
2021
Dubai Warrior	Regal Reality	Felix

2020-2011
2020
Sangarius	Bangkok	Dubai Warrior
2019
Dubai Warrior	Court House	Dalgarno
2018
Wissahickon	Big Country	Scarlet Dragon
2017
Petite Jack	Mia Tesoro	Utmost
2016
Battalion	Dubai Fashion	Grendisar
2015
Don't Be	Grendisar	Lamar
2014
Grendisar	Energia Davos	Brocklebank
2013
Dick Doughtywylie	Gatewood	Galician
2012
True To Form	Emerald Wilderness	Be Perfect
2011
Tinshu	Junoob	Mantoba

2010-2001
2009
Tranquil Tiger	Suits Me	Settigano
2008
Dansant	Suits Me	Bon Spiel
2007
Gentleman's Deal	Grand Passion	Voliere

The Quebec Stakes is a Listed flat horse race in Great Britain open to horses aged three years or older. It is run over a distance of 1 mile and 2 furlongs (2,012 metres) at Lingfield Park in December.

The race was first run in 2007.

== Records ==
Most successful horse (2 wins):

- Dubai Warrior (2019, 2021)

Leading jockey (3 wins):

- Robert Havlin – Dick Doughtywylie (2013), Wissahickon (2018), Dubai Warrior (2019)

Leading trainer (4 wins):

- John Gosden - Dick Doughtywylie (2013), Wissahickon (2018), Dubai Warrior (2019), Nebras (2025)

== Winners ==
Year	Winner	Age	Jockey	Trainer	Time
2007	Gentleman's Deal	6	Paul Mulrennan	Mick Easterby	2:06.29
2008	Dansant	4	Eddie Ahern	Gerard Butler	2:01.63
2009	Tranquil Tiger	5	Tom Queally	Henry Cecil	2:20.01
2010	Abandoned due to snow
2011	Tinshu	5	Dane O'Neill	Derek Haydn Jones	2:02.67
2012	True To Form	5	David Probert	Martyn Meade	2:04.02
2013	Dick Doughtywylie	5	Robert Havlin	John Gosden	2:05.03
2014	Grendisar	4	Adam Kirby	Marco Botti	2:07.29
2015	Don't Be	5	Luke Morris	Sir Mark Prescott	2:03.35
2016	Battalion	6	William Carson	Jamie Osborne	2:04.06
2017	Petite Jack	4	Luke Morris	Archie Watson	2:05.39
2018	Wissahickon	3	Robert Havlin	John Gosden	2:04.66
2019	Dubai Warrior	3	Robert Havlin	John Gosden	2:02.13
2020	Sangarius	4	Ryan Moore	Sir Michael Stoute	2:02.19
2021	Dubai Warrior	5	Richard Kingscote	David Loughnane	2:02.52
2022	Abandoned due to frost
2023	Tyrrhenian Sea	5	Jack Mitchell	Roger Varian	2:05.15
2024	Royal Champion	6	Clifford Lee	Karl Burke	2:02.77
2025	Nebras	3	Oisin Murphy	John & Thady Gosden	2:04.44

== See also ==
- Horse racing in Great Britain
- List of British flat horse races
