= Westow Stakes =

Flat horse race in Britain

- Class: Listed
- Location: York; York, England
- Inaugurated: 2009
- Race type: Flat / Thoroughbred
- Sponsor: British Stallion Studs
- Website: York

Race information
- Distance: 5f (1,006 metres)
- Surface: Turf
- Track: Straight
- Qualification: Three-years-old
- Weight: 9 st 4 lb Allowances; 5 lb for fillies Penalties; 5 lb for Group winners* 3 lb for Listed winners* *after 31 August 2024
- Purse: £70,000 (2025); 1st: £39,697

Westow Stakes
2026
Dickensian	Simplify	Aspect Island

Previous years
2025
Tropical Storm	Star Of Mehmas	Miss Lamai
2024
Big Evs	Sommelier	Dark Vintage
2023
Great State	Pillow Talk	Michaela's Boy
2022
Last Crusader	Guilded	Get Ahead
2021
Winter Power	Atalis Bay	Dexter Belle

2020-2011
2019
Garrus	Shades Of Blue	Soldier's Call
2018
Main Desire	Hey Jonesy	Roussel
2017
Fashion Queen	Kyllang Rock	Jumira Bridge
2016
Easton Angel	Gracious John	Fine Blend
2015
Profitable	Tendu	Strath Burn
2014
Shamshon	One Chance	Eccleston
2013
Smoothtalkinrascal	Lucky Beggar	Cosmic Chatter
2012
Pearl Secret	Ponty Acclaim	Caledonia Lady
2011
Night Carnation	Move In Time	The Thrill Is Gone

2010-2009
2010
Rose Blossom	Midnight Martini	Duchess Dora
2009
Anglezarke	Rievaulx World	Fault

The Westow Stakes is a Listed flat horse race in Great Britain open to horses aged three years only. It is run at York over a distance of 5 furlongs (1,006 metres), and it is scheduled to take place each year in May.

The race was first run in 2009 and was awarded Listed status in 2015.

== Winners ==
Year	Winner	Jockey	Trainer	Time	Status	Ref
2009	Anglezarke	David Allan	Tim Easterby	0:59.97	Class 2	2009
2010	Rose Blossom	Paul Hanagan	Richard Fahey	0:57.98	Class 2	2010
2011	Night Carnation	Jimmy Fortune	Andrew Balding	0:58.99	Class 2	2011
2012	Pearl Secret	Jamie Spencer	David Barron	1:00.49	Class 2	2012
2013	Smoothtalkinrascal	Daniel Tudhope	David O'Meara	1:01.84	Class 2	2013
2014	Shamshon	Frankie Dettori	Richard Hannon Jr.	1:01.09	Class 2	2014
2015	Profitable	Adam Kirby	Clive Cox	0:58.36	Listed	2015
2016	Easton Angel	Paul Mulrennan	Michael Dods	0:58.41	Listed	2016
2017	Fashion Queen	Daniel Tudhope	David O'Meara	1:00.17	Listed	2017
2018	Main Desire	Daniel Tudhope	Michael Bell	0:57.89	Listed	2018
2019	Garrus	Ryan Moore	Jeremy Noseda	0:57.61	Listed	2019
	no race 2020 (Note: The 2020 running was cancelled because of the COVID-19 pandemic in the United Kingdom)
2021	Winter Power	Silvestre de Sousa	Tim Easterby	0:58.26	Listed	2021
2022	Last Crusader	Daniel Tudhope	Karl Burke	0:58.50	Listed
2023	Great State	Oisin Murphy	Richard Fahey	0:57.14	Listed
2025	Tropical Storm	Oisin Murphy	Andrew Balding	0:58.94	Listed	2025
2026	Dickensian	Shane Gray	Kevin Ryan	0:59.54	Listed

== See also ==
- Horse racing in Great Britain
- List of British flat horse races
