= Jack Nicholls (jockey) =

British jockey (born 2006)

Personal information
- Born: 2006 (age 19–20) Thirsk
- Occupation: Jockey

Horse racing career
- Sport: Horse racing

Major racing wins
- Prix de l'Abbaye (2026)

Significant horses
- Miss Yechance

Jack Nicholls is a Group 1 winning English jockey who competes in Flat racing.

== Background ==
Nicholls was born in 2006 and grew up in Thirsk, where his parents, Adrian Nicholls and Clare Roche, both former jockeys, have a training yard. Nicholl's sister Mia is a jockey who rides in the United States. His grandfather, David Nicholls, was also a jockey and trainer.

== Racing career ==
Nicholls rode his first winner on Hurt You Never, trained by his father, at Redcar on 30 May 2023. It was his first ride in a race.

In August 2026, Nicholls rode Miss Yechance, a three-year-old filly trained by Karl Burke, for the first time and won a sprint handicap at York. The following month they won the Group 3 World Trophy at Newbury. It was the first time Nicholls had ridden in a Group race. After the race, Miss Yechance was supplemented into the Group 1 Prix de l'Abbaye at Longchamp in Paris. Nicholls, still an apprentice jockey, retained the ride for his first chance in a Group 1 race. On 5 October 2026, Miss Yechance carried Nicholls to a narrow victory in the Prix de l'Abbaye. Nicholls' grandfather had trained the winner of the same race in 2002, and his father had ridden in the race, achieving third place in 2005. Interviewed after his victory, Nicholls spoke about the family connection to the race and said: "I would have taken any Group One, but if I could have picked one it probably would have been the Abbaye".

== Major wins ==
France

- Prix de l'Abbaye - (1) - Miss Yechance (2026)
