= Land O'Burns Fillies' Stakes =

Flat horse race in Britain

Land O'Burns Fillies' Stakes
2026
Argentine Tango	Coconut Cove	Beautiful Diamond

Previous years
2025
Saratoga Special	First Instinct	Grande Marques
2024
Azure Blue	Beautiful Diamond	So Majestic
2023
Makarova	Marine Wave	Royal Aclaim
2022
Guilded	Tenaya Canyon	Hellomydarlin
2021
Keep Busy	Dickiedooda	Mid Winster

2020-2011
2020
Que Amoro	American Lady	Merry Banter
2019
Rebecca Rocks	Glass Slippers	Queen Of Desire
2018
Elnadim Star	Sandra's Secret	Sarshampla
2017
Spring Fling	Rural Celebration	Queen Kindly
2016
Marsha	Fine Blend	Buying Trouble
2015
Katawi	Holley Shiftwell	Dikta Del Mar
2014
Hay Chewed	Inyordreams	Reroute
2013
My Propeller	Jwala	I'm So Glad
2012
Angels Will Fall	My Girl Anna	Excelette
2011
Margot Did	Celerina	Ladies Are Forever

2010-2004
2010
Tropical Treat	City Dancer	Bewitched
2009
Sugar Free	City Dancer	Rothesay Dancer
2008
Look Busy	Princess Ellis	How's She Cuttin'
2007
Mecca's Mate	Final Dynasty	Morinqua
2006
Free Roses	Clear Impression	Bowness
2005
Mecca's Mate	Fruit of Glory	Notjustaprettyface
2004
Airwave	Forever Phoenix	Proud Boast

The Land O'Burns Fillies' Stakes is a Listed flat horse race in Great Britain open to mares and fillies aged three years or older. It is run at Ayr over a distance of 5 furlongs (1,006 metres), and it is scheduled to take place each year in June.

Until 1991 the race was run over 1 mile (1,609 metres). It has been restricted to mares and fillies since 1989.

== Records ==
Most successful horse (2 wins):

- Mecca's Mate - (2005, 2007)

Leading jockey (3 wins):

- Paul Mulrennan - Marsha (2016), Que Amoro (2020), Azure Blue (2024 dead heat)

Leading trainer (3 wins):

- Henry Candy - Airwave (2004), Spring Fling (2017), Rebecca Rocks (2019)

== Winners since 1988 ==
Year	Winner	Age	Jockey	Trainer	Time
1988	Jungle Gold	3	Nick Connorton	Bill Watts	1:48.89
1989	Church Light	3	Nick Connorton	Michael Jarvis	1:41.03
1990	Tafila	4	Michael Tebbutt	William Jarvis	1:41.03
1991	Power Take Off	5	Dean McKeown	Peter Makin	1:40.35
1992- 2003	No race
2004	Airwave	4	Darryll Holland	Henry Candy	0:57.49
2005	Mecca's Mate	4	Fergal Lynch	David Barker	0:58.45
2006	Free Roses	3	Fran Berry	Edward Lynam	1:00.18
2007	Mecca's Mate	6	Tony Hamilton	David Barker	0:59.44
2008	Look Busy	3	Danny Tudhope	Alan Berry	0:55.68
2009	Sugar Free	3	Wayne Lordan	Tommy Stack	0:57.94
2010	Tropical Treat	3	Jim Crowley	Ralph Beckett	0:58.16
2011	Margot Did	3	Hayley Turner	Michael Bell	1:01.27
2012	Angels Will Fall	3	Robert Winston	Charles Hills	0:59.41
2013	My Propeller	4	Robert Winston	Peter Chapple-Hyam	0:57.74
2014	Hay Chewed	3	Tom Eaves	Conrad Allen	0:59.01
2015	Katawi	4	David Allan	Chris Wall	0:57.99
2016	Marsha	3	Paul Mulrennan	Sir Mark Prescott	0:58.33
2017	Spring Fling	6	James Sullivan	Henry Candy	1:01.80
2018	Elnadim Star	3	Kevin Stott	Kevin Ryan	0:58.09
2019	Rebecca Rocks	5	Paul Hanagan	Henry Candy	0:57.79
2020	Que Amoro	4	Paul Mulrennan	Michael Dods	0:57.12
2021	Keep Busy	4	Jason Hart	John Quinn	0:58.08
2022	Guilded	3	Tom Eaves	Karl Burke	1:00.80
2023	Makarova	4	Paul Mulrennan	Ed Walker	0:56.38
2024 (dh)	Azure Blue; Beautiful Diamond	5; 3	Paul Mulrennan; David Nolan	Michael Dods; Karl Burke	0:57.09
2025	Saratoga Special	3	Keithen Kennedy	Jessica Harrington	0:57.31
2026	Argentine Tango	3	David Allan	Tim Easterby	0:59.25

== See also ==
- Horse racing in Great Britain
- List of British flat horse races
