= Sapphire Stakes (Ireland) =

- Class: Group 2
- Location: Curragh Racecourse; County Kildare, Ireland
- Inaugurated: 2001
- Race type: Flat / Thoroughbred
- Website: Curragh

Race information
- Distance: 5f (1,006 metres)
- Surface: Turf
- Track: Straight
- Qualification: Three-years-old and up
- Weight: 9 st 3 lb (3yo); 9 st 7 lb (4yo+); Allowances; 3 lb for fillies and mares Penalties; 3 lb for G1 * * since 1 November last year
- Purse: €75,200 (2020); 1st: €47,200

Sapphire Stakes
2026
Cover Up	Partisan Hero	Jakajaro

Previous years
2025
Arizona Blaze	Mgheera	Songhai
2024
Believing	Beautiful Diamond	Makarova
2023
Art Power	Go Athletico	Moss Tucker
2022
Ladies Church	Mooneista	Equilateral
2021
Mooneista	Gustavus Weston	Romantic Proposal

2020-2011
2020
A'ali	Make A Challenge	Rapid Reaction
2019
Soffia	El Astronaute	Garrus
2018
Havana Grey	Caspian Prince	Mabs Cross
2017
Caspian Prince	Marsha	Ardhoomey
2016
Mecca's Angel	Brando	Gracious John
2015
Stepper Point	Mecca's Angel	Moviesta
2014
Fountain Of Youth	Extortionist	Monsieur Joe
2013
Slade Power	Russian Soul	Morawij
2012
Definightly	Judge 'n Jury	Katla
2011
Invincible Ash	Hamish McGonagall	Move In Time

2010-2001
2010
Glamorous Spirit	Reverence	Elnawin
2009
Benbaun	Snaefell	Inxile
2008
Tax Free	Benbaun	Desert Lord
2007
Snaefell	Tax Free	Grecian Dancer
2006
Dandy Man	Benbaun	Osterhase
2005
Benbaun	Osterhase	Majestic Missile
2004
Osterhase	Moon Unit	Orientor
2003
Deportivo	Osterhase	Sun Slash
2002
Tiger Royal	Agnetha	Bishops Court
2001
Repertory	Ishiguru	Proud Native

The Sapphire Stakes is a Group 2 flat horse race in Ireland open to thoroughbreds aged three years or older. It is run at the Curragh over a distance of 5 furlongs (1,006 metres), and it is scheduled to take place each year in July.

The event was established in 2001, and it was originally classed at Listed level. For several years it was registered as the Richard H. Faught Memorial Stakes. It was renamed the Sapphire Stakes and promoted to Group 3 status in 2008. It was raised to Group 2 level in 2015.

The Sapphire Stakes was originally part of the Curragh's three-day Irish Derby Festival meeting. In 2015 it was moved to the Irish Oaks meeting and it is currently held on the second day, the day after the Irish Oaks.

== Records ==
Most successful horse (2 wins):

- Benbaun – 2005, 2009

Leading jockey (3 wins):

- Johnny Murtagh – Deportivo (2003), Snaefell (2007), Definightly (2012)

Leading trainer (2 wins):

- Michael Halford – Snaefell (2007), Invincible Ash (2011)
- Roger Charlton - Deportivo (2003), Definightly (2012)

== Winners ==
Year	Winner	Age	Jockey	Trainer	Time
2001	Repertory	8	Fergus Sweeney	Malcolm Saunders	0:59.40
2002	Tiger Royal	6	Pat Shanahan	Dermot Weld	0:59.80
2003	Deportivo	3	Johnny Murtagh	Roger Charlton	0:59.70
2004	Osterhase	5	Fran Berry	John Mulhern	0:57.30
2005	Benbaun	4	Kieren Fallon	Mark Wallace	0:57.40
2006	Dandy Man	3	Pat Shanahan	Con Collins	0:58.40
2007	Snaefell	3	Johnny Murtagh	Michael Halford	1:02.90
2008	Tax Free	6	Adrian Nicholls	David Nicholls	0:59.03
2009	Benbaun	8	Pat Smullen	Kevin Ryan	1:00.03
2010	Glamorous Spirit	4	Kieren Fallon	Ron Harris	0:57.85
2011	Invincible Ash	6	Gary Carroll	Michael Halford	1:00.13
2012	Definightly	6	Johnny Murtagh	Roger Charlton	1:02.13
2013	Slade Power	4	Wayne Lordan	Edward Lynam	0:57.51
2014	Fountain Of Youth	3	Seamie Heffernan	Aidan O'Brien	0:59.01
2015	Stepper Point	6	Pat Smullen	William Muir	0:58.75
2016	Mecca's Angel	5	Paul Mulrennan	Michael Dods	0:58.61
2017	Caspian Prince	8	Declan McDonogh	Tony Coyle	0:57.15
2018	Havana Grey	3	P. J. McDonald	Karl Burke	0:58.21
2019	Soffia	4	Declan McDonogh	Edward Lynam	0:58.51
2020	A’Ali	3	Colin Keane	Simon & Ed Crisford	0:59.85
2021	Mooneista	3	Colin Keane	Jack W Davison	0:58.75
2022	Ladies Church	3	Ben Coen	Johnny Murtagh	1:00.86
2023	Art Power	6	David Allan	Tim Easterby	1:00.92
2024	Believing	4	Ryan Moore	George Boughey	0:57.96
2025	Arizona Blaze	3	David Egan	Adrian Murray	0:58.36
2026	Cover Up	6	James Doyle	Simon & Ed Crisford	0:57.35

== See also ==
- Horse racing in Ireland
- List of Irish flat horse races
