= Alpinista =

British Thoroughbred racehorse

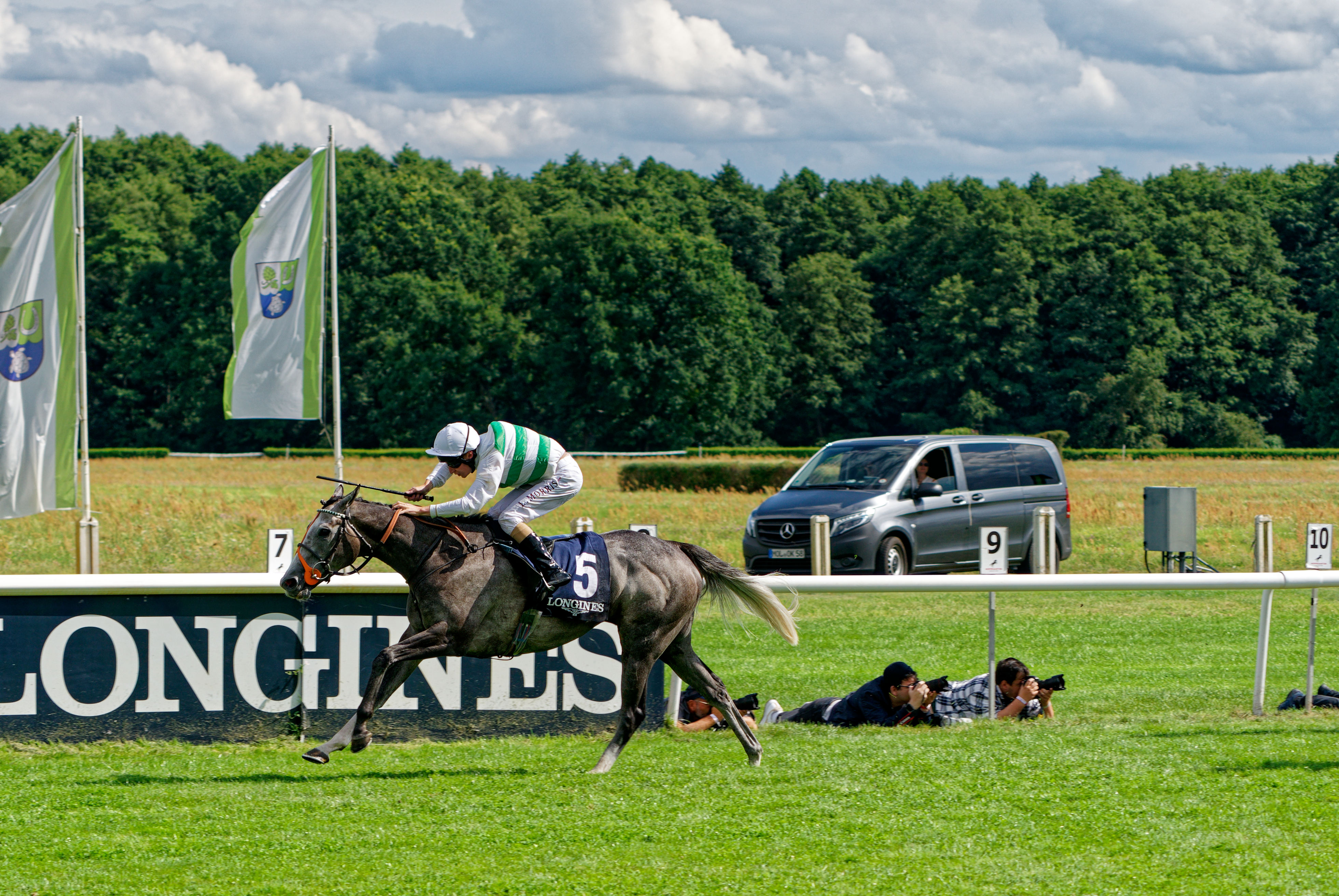
- Alpinista winning the 2021 Grosser Preis von Berlin
- Sire: Frankel
- Grandsire: Galileo
- Dam: Alwilda
- Damsire: Hernando
- Sex: Mare
- Foaled: 16 February 2017
- Country: United Kingdom
- Colour: Grey
- Breeder: Kirsten Rausing
- Owner: Kirsten Rausing
- Trainer: Mark Prescott
- Record: 15: 10-2-0
- Earnings: £3,321,033

Major wins
- Upavon Fillies' Stakes (2020); Daisy Warwick Stakes (2021); Lancashire Oaks (2021); Grosser Preis von Berlin (2021); Preis von Europa (2021); Grosser Preis von Bayern (2021); Grand Prix de Saint-Cloud (2022); Yorkshire Oaks (2022); Prix de l'Arc de Triomphe (2022); Timeform rating: 127
- Last updated on 24 July 2023

Alpinista (foaled 16 February 2017) is a British Thoroughbred racehorse. She showed some promise as a juvenile in 2019 when she won a maiden race on her debut and finished fourth in the Prix d'Aumale. In the following year she won the Upavon Fillies' Stakes and ran second in the Yorkshire Oaks. In 2021 she won all five of her races, namely the Daisy Warwick Stakes, Lancashire Oaks, Grosser Preis von Berlin, Preis von Europa and Grosser Preis von Bayern. As a five-year-old she added further major victories in the Grand Prix de Saint-Cloud, the Yorkshire Oaks and the Prix de l'Arc de Triomphe. The mare was retired to stud after a setback in training thwarted plans for a final racecourse appearance in the Japan Cup.

== Background ==
Alpinista is a grey mare bred in England by her owner Kirsten Rausing. She was sent into training with Mark Prescott at Heath House stable in Newmarket, Suffolk.

She was from the fourth crop of foals sired by Frankel, an undefeated racehorse whose other progeny have included Cracksman, Adayar, Soul Stirring and Hurricane Lane. Alpinista's dam Alwilda showed good racing ability, winning four of her twenty four starts including the Listed Silbernes Band in Germany as a five-year-old. Alwilda's dam Albanova was named German Horse of the Year in 2004 and was a full-sister to Alborada. Albanova was a granddaughter of Alruccaba, an influential broodmare whose other descendants have included Yesterday, Allegretto (Prix Royal Oak) and Aussie Rules (Poule d'Essai des Poulains).

== Racing career ==
=== 2019: two-year-old season ===
Alpinista made her debut in a maiden race over seven furlongs at Epsom Racecourse on 18 July when she was ridden by Luke Morris and started at odds of 11/4 in a six-runner field. She recovered from a slow start to take the lead approaching the final furlong and went clear of her opponents to win by two and a half lengths. She was then stepped up in class for the Group 3 Prestige Stakes at Goodwood Racecourse on 24 August but after becoming upset in the starting stalls she started poorly and never looked likely to win, coming home sixth of the seven runners behind Boomer. Two weeks later Alpinista was sent to France to contest the Group 3 Prix d'Aumale over 1400 metres on good to soft ground at Longchamp Racecourse. She raced towards the rear of the field before finishing strongly and finished fourth behind Savarin, beaten less than a length by the winner.

=== 2020: three-year-old season ===
The 2020 flat racing season was delayed by restrictions imposed in response to the COVID-19 pandemic and Alpinista did not race until 20 July when she was sent to France for the Listed Prix Madame Jean Couturie over 2000 metres at Vichy. She finished fourth behind Tickle Me Green but appeared to be an unlucky loser as she was beaten three quarters of a length by the winner after being denied a clear run in the closing stages. For her first run of the season in England she was ridden by Ryan Tate when she started at odds of 12/1 for the Listed Upavon Fillies' Stakes over ten furlongs at Salisbury Racecourse on 13 August. In a change of tactics, Alpinista went to the front soon after the start and was never seriously challenged, drawing away in the closing stages to win by more than three lengths from the Queen's filly Award Scheme. Tate, who was winning his first major race, commented "It was a great opportunity given to me by the boss, and thank you to the owners for letting me ride her. She has always been a very nice filly at home and thankfully she is progressing the right way – and there is plenty more left in the locker."

A week after her win at Salisbury Alpinista was moved up to Group 1 class for the first time to contest the Yorkshire Oaks over one and a half miles at York Racecourse. Ridden by Tate she started the 33/1 outsider of the six runners but belied her odds as she stayed on well to finish second to the favourite Love. On her final run of the season Alpinista started favourite for the Group 3 Princess Royal Stakes at Newmarket Racecourse on 25 September but was beaten half a length by the four-year-old Antonia De Vega after hanging to the left in the closing stages.

=== 2021: four-year-old season ===
Alpinista began her third campaign in the Listed Daisy Warwick Stakes over one and a half miles at Goodwood on 30 April and started the 13/8 favourite against three opponents. Ridden by Morris she settled in second place behind the six-year-old Makawee before getting the better of a "sustained battle" with her older rival in the straight to prevail by a short head. After the race Luke Morris said "The plan was to make all today, but [James Doyle on Makawee] was quite keen to go on, so I was quite happy to take a close sit. When I finally drew up to him at the two pole I was fairly confident I had his measure... My filly is probably a gallop or two short of her best on her homework and she was just a bit ring-rusty when I went for her. Hopefully there's plenty of improvement in her."

After a break of over two months, Alpinista returned to the track at Haydock Park on 3 July when she started the 11/4 favourite for the Group 3 Lancashire Oaks on soft ground, with the best fancied of her eight opponents being the three-year-olds Dubai Fountain (winner of the Cheshire Oaks) and Mystery Angel (Pretty Polly Stakes). After being settled in second place by Morris behind the front-running Mystery Angel, Alpinista took the lead inside the last quarter mile and stayed on well to win by one and a quarter lengths from Lady Hayes. Her assistant trainer William Butler, commented "She's very game and we've trained lots of her family, who were very game as well. We were slightly worried about the ground as she was so effective on firm last summer, but her class got her through."

Alpinista was then sent to Germany to contest the Group 1 Grosser Preis von Berlin over 2400 metres at Hoppegarten on 8 August 2021 when she attempted to emulate grand-dam Albanova who won the race in 2004. With Morris in the saddle she started the 3.8/1 third choice in the betting behind Torquator Tasso and Walton Street (Dubai City of Gold) in an eight-runner field which also included Sunny Queen (Grosser Preis von Bayern), Kaspar (Grosser Preis der Badischen Wirtschaft) and Nerium (Gerling-Preis). She settled in fourth place as Walton Street set the pace from Kaspar and Torquator Tasso before moving up on the outside on the final turn. Alpinista ran down Walton Street 200 metres from the finish, opened up a clear advantage and won by two and three quarter lengths and a length from Torquator Tasso and Walton Street. Prescott, commenting from his home in Newmarket, said "This was the aim and it's not often these things go according to plan is it? I never get tired of winning any race—aren't I lucky? She stays, doesn't she? She just got stronger the further she went." The form of the race was subsequently franked as Torquator Tasso and Walton Street won the Prix de l'Arc de Triomphe and the Canadian International Stakes respectively.

On 26 September Alpinista returned to Germany and again attempted to follow in the hoofprints of Albanova when she contested the Preis von Europa over 2400 metres at Cologne and started the 1.1/1 favourite. Her seven opponents included Sisfahan (Deutsches Derby), Northern Ruler (Prix du Lys), Kaspar, Sunny Queen and Nerium. With Morris in the saddle as usual, she tracked the leaders on the outside as Nerium set the pace before making a forward move entering the straight. She overhauled the leader 200 metres from the finish and won by one and a quarter lengths from Nerium, with Sisfahan in third. Butler commented "It's great – she's done everything we've asked of her this year... So we're very, very lucky to have her... The main thing is to get her back home and make sure she's OK... With these fillies, you've just got to make sure they're in good form and they're healthy – and when they are, they can do things like this."

Alpinista finished the season unbeaten with a win in Grosser Preis Von Bayern in Munich, Germany, taking her Group 1 tally to three. Prescott confirmed that the target for Alpinista in 2022 would be the Prix de l'Arc de Triomphe in the autumn.

=== 2022: five-year-old season ===
After a break of eight months, Alpinista began her 2022 campaign with a trip to France to run in the Group 1 Grand Prix de Saint-Cloud on 3 July. Beating Baratti by one and a half lengths, she left 4/5 favourite Hurricane Lane well beaten in 8th place.

Her next race was the Yorkshire Oaks on 18 August. Starting as favourite, she won by a length from Epsom Oaks winner Tuesday. It was her seventh consecutive win and fifth Group 1 victory. After the ride Morris said: "It was very smooth, such a magical feeling. I could feel something coming late on, I wasn't sure who it was but as she felt it coming she squeezed a bit more for me".

Alpinista, ridden by Morris, went off as favourite in a field of twenty in the Prix de l'Arc de Triomphe at Longchamp on 2 October 2022. She went into the lead a furlong and a half out and won by half a length with Vadeni, ridden by Christophe Soumillon, and previous year's winner Torquator Tasso, ridden by Frankie Dettori, closing in on her at the post. Her trainer said "I think she's improved with every single run in the last two years and she's had to improve each time. Whether she can go on more, I don't know, but she's been faultless for two years, and the jockey's been faultless for two years. This is her best race but every single one of the last seven has been better than the one before, so it's been a marvellous journey."

Alpinista's connections had plans to run her for the last time in the Japan Cup the following month, but she experienced a setback in training and Prescott announced her retirement to stud on 10 November 2023. She joined other broodmares at Rausing's Landwades Stud in Newmarket.

== Breeding record ==
Alpinista gave birth to her first foal, a filly sired by Dubawi, in February 2024.

== Pedigree ==
Pedigree of Alpinista (GB), grey mare, 2017
| Sire Frankel (GB) 2008 | Galileo (IRE); 1998 | Sadler's Wells (USA) | Northern Dancer (CAN) |
| Sire Frankel (GB) 2008 | Galileo (IRE); 1998 | Sadler's Wells (USA) | Fairy Bridge |
| Sire Frankel (GB) 2008 | Galileo (IRE); 1998 | Urban Sea (USA) | Miswaki |
| Sire Frankel (GB) 2008 | Galileo (IRE); 1998 | Urban Sea (USA) | Allegretta (GB) |
| Sire Frankel (GB) 2008 | Kind (IRE); 2001 | Danehill (USA) | Danzig |
| Sire Frankel (GB) 2008 | Kind (IRE); 2001 | Danehill (USA) | Razyana |
| Sire Frankel (GB) 2008 | Kind (IRE); 2001 | Rainbow Lake (GB) | Rainbow Quest (USA) |
| Sire Frankel (GB) 2008 | Kind (IRE); 2001 | Rainbow Lake (GB) | Rockfest (USA) |
| Dam Alwilda (GB) 2010 | Hernando (FR); 1990 | Niniski (USA) | Nijinsky (CAN) |
| Dam Alwilda (GB) 2010 | Hernando (FR); 1990 | Niniski (USA) | Virginia Hills |
| Dam Alwilda (GB) 2010 | Hernando (FR); 1990 | Whakilyric (USA) | Miswaki |
| Dam Alwilda (GB) 2010 | Hernando (FR); 1990 | Whakilyric (USA) | Lyrism |
| Dam Alwilda (GB) 2010 | Albanova (GB); 1999 | Alzao (USA) | Lyphard |
| Dam Alwilda (GB) 2010 | Albanova (GB); 1999 | Alzao (USA) | Lady Rebecca (GB) |
| Dam Alwilda (GB) 2010 | Albanova (GB); 1999 | Alouette | Darshaan |
| Dam Alwilda (GB) 2010 | Albanova (GB); 1999 | Alouette | Alruccaba (IRE) (Family: 9-c) |

- Alpinista is inbred 4 × 4 to Miswaki, meaning that this stallion appears twice in the fourth generation of her pedigree.
