= Cornwallis Stakes =

Flat horse race in Britain

- Class: Group 3
- Location: Newmarket Racecourse; Newmarket, England
- Inaugurated: 1946
- Race type: Flat / Thoroughbred
- Sponsor: Newmarket Academy
- Website: Newmarket

Race information
- Distance: 5f (1,006 metres)
- Surface: Turf
- Track: Straight
- Qualification: Two-year-olds
- Weight: 9 st 3 lb Allowances; 3 lb for fillies Penalties; 5 lb for G1 / G2 winners 3 lb for G3 winners
- Purse: £65,000 (2025); 1st: £34,026

Cornwallis Stakes
2026
Mussab	In The Black	Fast Track

Previous years
2025
Beckford's Folly	Brussels	Aspect Island
2024
Coto De Caza	Grande Marques	Kullazain
2023
Inquisitively	Rosario	Unbreak My Heart
2022
Rumstar	Maylandsea	Prince Of Pillo
2021
Twilight Jet	Illustrating	Guilded

2020-2011
2020
Winter Power	Method	Burning Cash
2019
Good Vibes	Pistoletto	Jouska
2018
Sergei Prokofiev	Well Done Fox	Barbill
2017
Abel Handy	Sound And Silence	Mokaatil
2016
Mrs Danvers	Clem Fandango	Battaash
2015
Quiet Reflection	Field of Vision	Shadow Hunter
2014
Royal Razalma	Strath Burn	Volatile
2013
Hot Streak	Outer Space	Kickboxer
2012
Bungle Inthejungle	Garswood	El Manati
2011
Ponty Acclaim	Miss Lahar	Caledonia Lady

2010-2001
2010
Electric Waves	Move In Time	Darajaat
2009
Our Jonathan	Taajub	Iver Bridge Lad
2008
Amour Propre	Waffle	Mrs Kipling
2007
Captain Gerrard	Cute Ass	Cake
2006
Alzerra	Hoh Mike	Enticing
2005
Hunter Street	Ajigolo	Shermeen
2004
Castelletto	Cornus	Kay Two
2003
Majestic Missile	Nights Cross	Fast Heart
2002
Peace Offering	Speed Cop	Revenue
2001
Dominica	Wishmaster	Pachara

2000-1991
2000
Danehurst	Fromsong	Red Millennium
1999
Kier Park	The Tatling	Watching
1998
Show Me The Money	Deadly Nightshade	Monkston Point
1997
Halmahera	Lord Kintyre	Ella
1996
Easycall	Check The Band	Grand Lad
1995
MubhijI	Westcourt Magic	The Man
1994
Millstream	Overbrook	Raah Algharb
1992
Up And At 'Em	Roger The Butler	Surprise Offer
1991
Magic Ring	Harvest Girl	Power Lake

1990-1988
1990
Mujadil	Clifton Charlie	Vintage Only
1989
Argentum	Somethingdifferent	Dancing Music
1988
Hadif	Tigani	Or Acier

The Cornwallis Stakes is a Group 3 flat horse race in Great Britain open to two-year-old horses. It is run at Newmarket over a distance of 5 furlongs (1,006 metres), and it is scheduled to take place each year in October.

== History ==
The event was established at Ascot in 1946, and it was initially contested over 6 furlongs (1,207 metres). The inaugural running was won by Golden Hackle. It was extended to a mile in 1948, and cut to 5 furlongs (1,006 metres) in 1957. Until 2013 it was run in early October and in 2014 it was transferred to Newmarket to become part of the "Future Champions Day" fixture in mid-October.

The present system of race grading was introduced in 1971, and the Cornwallis Stakes was classed at Group 3 level.

== Records ==
Leading jockey (3 wins):

- Joe Mercer – Plainsong (1953), Rosalba (1958), Pushy (1980)
- Lester Piggott – Abelia (1957), Favorita (1960), Tin King (1965)
- Martin Dwyer – Halmahera (1997), Dominica (2001), Alzerra (2006)
- Richard Kingscote - Royal Razalma (2014), Mrs Danvers (2016), Good Vibes (2019)

Leading trainer (3 wins):

- Noel Murless – Abelia (1957), Favorita (1960), Splashing (1973)
- Jonathan Portman - Royal Razalma (2014), Mrs Danvers (2016), Rumstar (2022)

== Winners ==
Year	Winner	Jockey	Trainer	Time
1946	Golden Hackle	Arthur Wragg	Ossie Bell	1:18.80
1947	Straight Play	Herbert Packham	Herbert Smyth	1:19.40
1948	Burnt Brown	Michael Beary	Cecil Boyd-Rochfort	1:46.60
1949	Stella Polaris	Edgar Britt	Marcus Marsh	1:44.80
1950	Par Avion	Jimmy Thompson	William Bellerby	1:53.20
1951	Sir Phoenix	Ken Gethin	Peter Thrale	1:50.40
1952	Prince Canarina	Charlie Elliott	Harvey Leader	1:47.40
1953	Plainsong	Joe Mercer	Harvey Leader	1:47.00
1954	Lark	Bill Rickaby	Jack Jarvis	1:51.60
1955	Roman Conquest	Doug Smith	Geoffrey Brooke	1:51.61
1956 (Note: The 1956 running was held at Kempton Park)	Star Magic	Harry Carr	Derrick Candy	1:43.60
1957	Abelia	Lester Piggott	Noel Murless	1:03.50
1958	Rosalba	Joe Mercer	Jack Colling	1:07.77
1959	Sing Sing	Doug Smith	Jack Watts	1:05.26
1960 (Note: The 1960 running was held at Kempton Park)	Favorita	Lester Piggott	Noel Murless	1:05.20
1961	Prince Tor	Bill Rickaby	Brud Fetherstonhaugh	1:06.10
1962	Fair Astronomer	Garnet Bougoure	Jimmy Lenehan	1:04.20
1963 (Note: The 1963 running was held at Kempton Park)	Derring-Do	Scobie Breasley	Arthur Budgett	Not taken
1964	Spaniards Mount	Scobie Breasley	Fred Winter Snr.	1:06.35
1965	Tin King	Lester Piggott	Fulke Johnson Houghton	1:04.46
1966	Green Park	Jimmy Lindley	Jeremy Tree	1:06.04
1967	So Blessed	Frankie Durr	Paul Davey	1:05.06
1968	Abandoned due to waterlogging
1969	Huntercombe	Sandy Barclay	Arthur Budgett	1:02.26
1970	Cawston's Pride	Brian Taylor	Freddie Maxwell	1:01.24
1971	Deep Diver	Bill Williamson	Paul Davey	1:01.94
1972	The Go-Between	Jimmy Lindley	Jeremy Hindley	1:01.56
1973	Splashing	Geoff Lewis	Noel Murless	1:03.71
1974	Paris Review	Geoff Lewis	Jeremy Tree	1:09.92
1975	Western Jewel	Pat Eddery	Gavin Hunter	1:02.12
1976	Abandoned due to waterlogging
1977	Absalom	Taffy Thomas	Ryan Jarvis	1:04.60
1978	Greenland Park	Willie Carson	William Hastings-Bass	1:00.92
1979	Hanu	Greville Starkey	Scobie Breasley	1:03.28
1980	Pushy	Joe Mercer	Henry Cecil	1:03.83
1981	My Lover	Bruce Raymond	Michael Jarvis	1:06.88
1982	Tatibah	John Reid	Fulke Johnson Houghton	1:06.48
1983	Petorius	Walter Swinburn	Michael Stoute	1:02.66
1984	Doulab	Tony Murray	Harry Thomson Jones	1:03.15
1985	Hallgate	Kevin Hodgson	Sally Hall	1:01.56
1986	Singing Steven	Brian Rouse	Richard Hannon Sr.	1:02.00
1987	Abandoned due to waterlogging
1988	Hadif	Pat Eddery	Robert Armstrong	1:03.22
1989	Argentum	John Reid	Jack Holt	1:02.05
1990	Mujadil	Steve Cauthen	Robert Armstrong	1:00.29
1991	Magic Ring	Alan Munro	Paul Cole	1:02.42
1992	Up and at 'Em	Benjy Coogan	Jimmy Coogan	1:01.03
1993	Abandoned due to waterlogging
1994	Millstream	Jason Weaver	Mark Johnston	1:01.26
1995	Mubhij	Willie Carson	Barry Hills	1:05.36
1996	Easycall	Michael Tebbutt	Brian Meehan	1:01.94
1997	Halmahera	Martin Dwyer	Ian Balding	1:04.06
1998	Show Me the Money	Johnny Murtagh	Noel Meade	1:06.25
1999	Kier Park	Philip Robinson	Michael Jarvis	1:05.23
2000 (Note: The 2000 edition was run at Newbury after being called off at Ascot due to a security alert)	Danehurst	George Duffield	Sir Mark Prescott	1:03.18
2001	Dominica	Martin Dwyer	Marcus Tregoning	1:03.38
2002	Peace Offering	Kevin Darley	Terry Mills	1:02.24
2003	Majestic Missile	Kieren Fallon	William Haggas	1:01.93
2004 (Note: The 2004 race was held at Newmarket, and the 2005 running was at Salisbury)	Castelletto	Graham Gibbons	Bryan McMahon	1:01.79
2005	Hunter Street	Alan Munro	Peter Chapple-Hyam	1:00.21
2006	Alzerra	Martin Dwyer	Mick Channon	1:01.94
2007	Captain Gerrard	Tom Eaves	Bryan Smart	1:00.81
2008	Amour Propre	Dane O'Neill	Henry Candy	1:01.39
2009	Our Jonathan	Jamie Spencer	Kevin Ryan	1:01.29
2010	Electric Waves	Richard Mullen	Ed McMahon	1:01.21
2011	Ponty Acclaim	Ted Durcan	Tim Easterby	1:00.54
2012	Bungle Inthejungle	Martin Harley	Mick Channon	1:01.73
2013	Hot Streak	Jamie Spencer	Kevin Ryan	1:00.24
2014	Royal Razalma	Richard Kingscote	Jonathan Portman	1:00.55
2015	Quiet Reflection	Graham Lee	Karl Burke	0:59.14
2016	Mrs Danvers	Richard Kingscote	Jonathan Portman	0:58.69
2017	Abel Handy	James Doyle	Declan Carroll	0:58.65
2018	Sergei Prokofiev	Donnacha O'Brien	Aidan O'Brien	0:59.46
2019	Good Vibes	Richard Kingscote	David Evans	0:59.27
2020	Winter Power	Silvestre de Sousa	Tim Easterby	0:59.75
2021	Twilight Jet	Leigh Roche	Michael O'Callaghan	1:00.00
2022	Rumstar	Rob Hornby	Jonathan Portman	0:58.10
2023	Inquisitively (Note: The 2023 winner Inquisitively was later exported to Hong Kong and renamed Fast Responder)	William Buick	Kevin Philippart De Foy	0:59.65
2024	Coto De Caza	Harry Davies	Simon & Ed Crisford	0:59.21
2025	Beckford's Folly	William Buick	Charlie Appleby	0:57.51
2026	Mussab	Oisin Orr	Richard & Peter Fahey	0:56.98

== See also ==
- Horse racing in Great Britain
- List of British flat horse races
