= Prix de Saint-Georges =

- Class: Group 3
- Location: Longchamp Racecourse; Paris, France
- Inaugurated: 1929
- Race type: Flat / Thoroughbred
- Website: france-galop.com

Race information
- Distance: 1,000 metres (5f)
- Surface: Turf
- Track: Straight
- Qualification: Three-years-old and up
- Weight: 54 kg (3yo); 58 kg (4yo+); Allowances; 1½ kg for fillies and mares 1 kg if not Group placed * Penalties; 4 kg for Group 1 winners * 3 kg for Group 2 winners * 3 kg if two Group 3 wins * 2 kg if one Group 3 win * * since July 1 last year
- Purse: €56,000 (2020); 1st: €28,000

Prix de Saint-Georges
2026
Rayevka	Afjan	Lesslepasser

Previous years
2025
Mgheera	Ciao Pa'	Ponntos
2024
Ponntos	Makarova	Mgheera
2023
White Lavender	Perdika	Forza Capitano
2022
Ponntos	Berneuil	Suesa
2021
Ideal Beauty	Berneuil	Sestilio Jet

2020-2011
2020
Batwan	Gold Vibe	Sestilio Jet
2019
Sestilio Jet	Batwan	Ken Colt
2018
City Light	Gold Vibe	Son Cesio
2017
Signs Of Blessing	Profitable	Finsbury Square
2016
Finsbury Square	Son Cesio	Ride Like The Wind
2015
Mecca's Angel	Robert Le Diable	Hot Streak
2014
Catcall	Signs Of Blessing	Stepper Point
2013
Catcall	Move In Time	Place In My Heart
2012
Beyond Desire	Monsieur Joe	Calahorra
2011
Inxile	Captain Dunne	Split Trois

2010-2001
2010
Marchand D'Or	Benbaun	Kolokol
2009
Mood Music	Benbaun	Inxile
2008
Only Answer	Mood Music	Derison
2007
Peace Offering	Beauty Is Truth	Kourka
2006
Latona	Matrix	Biniou
2005
Chineur	Miss Emma	Tycoon's Hill
2004
The Trader	The Tatling	Patavellian
2003
Best Walking	Zipping	Ela Merici
2002
Maybe Forever	Porlezza	Slap Shot
2001
Dananeyev	Season's Greetings	Proud Native

2000-1990
2000
Sampower Star	Watching	Seltitude
1999
Black Rock Desert	Imperfect World	Cortachy Castle
1998
Sainte Marine	Pas De Reponse	Piperi
1997
Hever Golf Rose	Titus Livius	Wardara
1996
Anabaa	Bouche Bee	Vilayet
1995
Struggler	Spain Lane	Way West
1994
West Man	Lord Felix	Bunty Boo
1993
Robin Des Pins	Monde Bleu	Cardoun
1992
Elbio	Dream Talk	Mister Slippers
1991
Pont-Aven	Luring	Ron's Victory
1990
Ron's Victory	Nabeel Dancer	Nityo

The Prix de Saint-Georges is a Group 3 flat horse race in France open to thoroughbreds aged three years or older. It is run over a distance of 1,000 metres (about 5 furlongs) at Longchamp in May.

== History ==
The event is named after Haras de Saint-Georges, a stud farm near Moulins owned by Emmanuel d'Harcourt (1844–1928). The race was established in 1929, and the first running was won by Clarawood.

The Prix de Saint-Georges was cancelled in 1940, and held at Maisons-Laffitte from 1943 to 1945. It was staged at Chantilly in 1968.

The present race grading system was introduced in 1971, and the Prix de Saint-Georges was subsequently given Group 3 status.

It is currently one of four open-age 1,000-metre Group races in France. The others are the Prix du Gros Chêne, the Prix du Petit Couvert and the Prix de l'Abbaye.

== Records ==
Most successful horse (3 wins):

- Constans – 1972, 1973, 1974

Leading jockey (5 wins):

- Yves Saint-Martin – Jannic (1960), Fortino (1962), Montgomery (1971), Adraan (1980), Last Tycoon (1986)

Leading trainer (5 wins):

- François Mathet – Polic (1957), Texana (1958), Jannic (1960), Fortino (1962), Adraan (1980)

Leading owner (4 wins):

- François Dupré – Polic (1957), Texana (1958), Jannic (1960), Fortino (1962)
- Monica Sheriffe – Constans (1972, 1973, 1974), Sharpo (1981)

== Winners since 1980 ==
Year	Winner	Age	Jockey	Trainer	Owner	Time
1980	Adraan	3	Yves Saint-Martin	François Mathet	HH Aga Khan IV	0:55.00
1981	Sharpo	4	Pat Eddery	Jeremy Tree	Monica Sheriffe	1:00.30
1982	Blue Courtier	5	Alain Bredillet	Daniel Becquemin	Arve Farestveit
1983	Sky Lawyer	5	Gérard Dubroeucq	Raymond Touflan	Ecurie Chandre-Cozzi	0:59.10
1984	Sicyos	3	Freddy Head	Criquette Head	Haras d'Etreham	0:56.60
1985	Parioli	4	Maurice Philipperon	John Cunnington, Jr.	Danny Arnold	0:55.80
1986	Last Tycoon	3	Yves Saint-Martin	Robert Collet	Richard Strauss	0:56.20
1987	Tenue de Soiree	3	Gary W. Moore	Criquette Head	Haras d'Etreham	0:56.50
1988	Glifahda	5	Freddy Head	David Smaga	Thierry van Zuylen	0:59.10
1989	Holst	5	Cash Asmussen	André Fabre	Khalid Abdullah	0:56.40
1990	Ron's Victory	3	Tony Cruz	Alain Falourd	Jerry Moss	0:58.10
1991	Pont-Aven	4	Cash Asmussen	Robert Collet	Richard Strauss	1:00.30
1992	Elbio	5	Steve Cauthen	Peter Makin	Brian Brackpool	0:56.90
1993	Robin des Pins	5	Cash Asmussen	François Boutin	Stavros Niarchos	0:57.10
1994	West Man	3	William Mongil	Robert Collet	Henri Chalhoub	0:57.80
1995	Struggler	3	Frédéric Sanchez	Carlos Laffon-Parias	Hamad Ali	0:58.20
1996	Anabaa	4	Freddy Head	Criquette Head	Ghislaine Head	0:59.60
1997	Hever Golf Rose	6	Seb Sanders	Joe Naughton	Hever Racing Club	0:59.80
1998	Sainte Marine	3	Dominique Boeuf	Robert Collet	Richard Strauss	0:55.20
1999	Black Rock Desert	3	Michael Kinane	Aidan O'Brien	Tabor / Magnier	0:57.50
2000	Sampower Star	4	Frankie Dettori	Saeed bin Suroor	Godolphin	0:58.90
2001	Dananeyev	5	Olivier Doleuze	Carlos Laffon-Parias	Wertheimer et Frère	0:56.00
2002	Maybe Forever	3	Yutaka Take	Carlos Laffon-Parias	Maktoum Al Maktoum	0:56.90
2003	Best Walking	4	Thierry Jarnet	Werner Hefter	Stall Cimba	0:56.00
2004	The Trader	6	Jamie Spencer	Michael Blanshard	Caroline Ward	0:56.80
2005	Chineur	4	Christophe Lemaire	Mikel Delzangles	Marquesa de Moratalla	0:57.70
2006	Latona	4	Thierry Gillet	Jonathan Pease	John Goelet	0:56.70
2007	Peace Offering	7	Adrian Nicholls	David Nicholls	Lady O'Reilly	0:55.20
2008	Only Answer	4	Olivier Peslier	André Fabre	Wertheimer et Frère	0:57.00
2009	Mood Music ^{[a]}	5	Maxime Guyon	Mario Hofer	WH Sport International	0:55.78
2010	Marchand d'Or	7	Davy Bonilla	Mikel Delzangles	Carla Giral	0:55.90
2011	Inxile	6	Adrian Nicholls	David Nicholls	Love / Nicholls	0:55.92
2012	Beyond Desire	5	Jamie Spencer	Roger Varian	Clipper Logistics	0:57.03
2013	Catcall	4	Francois-Xavier Betras	Philippe Sogorb	Mme Gerard Samama	0:55.57
2014	Catcall	5	Olivier Peslier	Philippe Sogorb	Mme Gerard Samama	0:56.92
2015	Mecca's Angel	4	Paul Mulrennan	Michael Dods	David T. J. Metcalfe	0:55.24
2016	Finsbury Square^{[b]}	4	Christophe Soumillon	Fabrice Chappet	Berend Van Delfsen	0:57.70
2017	Signs Of Blessing^{[b]}	6	Stéphane Pasquier	Francois Rohaut	Isabelle Corbani	0:57.34
2018	City Light	4	Gregory Benoist	Stephane Wattel	Jean-Louis Bouchard	0:56.24
2019	Sestilio Jet	4	Frankie Dettori	Andrea Marcialis	Akhal Teke Properties	0:59.02
2020	Batwan	5	Maxime Guyon	Philippe Sogorb	Guy Pariente	0:59.01
2021	Ideal Beauty	3	Mickael Barzalona	André Fabre	Godolphin	0:56.74
2022	Ponntos	4	Frankie Dettori	Miroslav Nieslanik	Eva Nieslanikova	0:55.63
2023	White Lavender	5	Tom Marquand	Karl Burke	Barbara M. Keller	0:57.29
2024	Ponntos	6	Mickael Barzalona	Miroslav Nieslanik	Dr Eva Nieslanikova	0:55.58
2025	Mgheera	5	Oisin Murphy	Ed Walker	Lord Lloyd Webber & Arthur Mitchell	0:54.95
2026	Rayevka	4	Mickael Barzalona	Francis-Henri Graffard	Aga Khan Studs SCEA	0:55:51

^{a} Inxile finished first in 2009, but he was relegated to third place following a stewards' inquiry.
^{b} The 2016 and 2017 runnings took place at Deauville while Longchamp was closed for redevelopment.

== Earlier winners ==
- 1929: Clarawood
- 1930: Zambelli
- 1931: Dickens
- 1932: My Beauty
- 1933: La Pommeraie
- 1934: Makila
- 1935: If
- 1936: Fingall
- 1937: Iskandar
- 1938: Turbator
- 1939: Simone
- 1940: no race
- 1941: Thread
- 1942: Djerme
- 1943: Fine Art
- 1944: Tango
- 1945:
- 1946: Boree
- 1947: Thiercelin
- 1948: Merry Maid
- 1949: Rio
- 1950: Sarrau
- 1951: Fast Street
- 1952:
- 1953: Aria Viva
- 1954:
- 1955: Basque
- 1956: Palariva
- 1957: Polic
- 1958: Texana
- 1959: Blysmus
- 1960: Jannic
- 1961: Carissimo
- 1962: Fortino
- 1963: L'Épinay
- 1964: Takawalk
- 1965: Polyfoto
- 1966: Yours
- 1967: Yours
- 1968: Tudor Black
- 1969: Lear Jet
- 1970: Prime Action
- 1971: Montgomery
- 1972: Constans
- 1973: Constans
- 1974: Constans
- 1975: Flirting Around
- 1976: Girl Friend
- 1977: Girl Friend
- 1978: Polyponder
- 1979: King of Macedon

== See also ==
- List of French flat horse races
