= Milton Bradley (racehorse trainer) =

British racehorse trainer (1935–2023)

John Milton Bradley (5 January 1935 – January 2023) was a British horse trainer who trained horses which competed in both Flat racing and National Hunt racing.

Bradley trained the winners of 1,037 races in a training career which lasted from 1970 to 2021. The best horse he trained was The Tatling, winner of the King's Stand Stakes in 2004.
