= Roses Stakes =

Flat horse race in Britain

- Class: Listed
- Location: York Racecourse; York, England
- Race type: Flat / Thoroughbred
- Sponsor: Family of Julia Graves
- Website: York

Race information
- Distance: 5f (1,006 metres)
- Surface: Turf
- Track: Straight
- Qualification: Two-year-olds
- Weight: 9 st 2 lb; Allowances; 5 lb for fillies and mares Penalties; 5 lb for Group winners 3 lb for Listed winners
- Purse: £100,000 (2025); 1st: £56,710

Roses Stakes
2026
Sale Shark	Adonius	Hickory Lad

Previous years
2025
Revival Power	Military Code	Dickensian
2024
Tropical Storm	Magnum Force	Sir Yoshi
2023
Inquisitively	Purosangue	Sketch
2022
Treasure Trove	Rocket Rodney	Bolt Action
2021
Attagirl	Caturra	Mitbaahy

2020-2011
2020
Acklam Express	Queen Of Rio	Nomadic Empire
2019
Alligator Alley	Dr Simpson	Streamline
2018
Well Done Fox	Deia Glory	Sabre
2017
Sound And Silence	Abel Handy	Out Of The Flames
2016
Big Time Baby	Afandem	Smokey Lane
2015
Shadow Hunter	Rouleau	Kurland
2014
Mind Of Madness	Moonraker	Al Fareej
2013
Hot Streak	Mecca's Angel	City Zen
2012
Hoyam	Fire Eyes	Lasilia
2011
My Propeller	Last Bid	Excelette

2010-2001
2010
New Planet	Pabusar	Julius Geezer
2009
Star Rover	Mister Manannan	Love Lockdown
2007
Captain Gerrard	Cake	Fred's Lad
2006
Not For Me	Fanlight Fanny	Smart Instinct
2005
Tabaret	Godfrey Street	Ajigolo
2004
Dance Night	Moscow Music	Bigalos Bandit
2003
Howick Falls	If Paradise	Fast Heart
2002
Progressing Times	Cumbrian Venture	Bond Becks
2001
Pepperoni	Izmail	Rum Destiny

2000-1991
2000
Bouncing Bowdler	Senior Minister	Nearly A Fool
1999
Buy Or Sell	Alfailak	Melon Place
1998
Red Prairie	Trinity	Saafend Rock
1997
Bay Prince	Yorkies Boy	The Limping Cat
1996
Janib	Tipsy Creek	Rudi's Pet
1995
MubhijI	Rambling Bear	High Priority
1994
Raah Algharb	Wavian	Sergeyev
1993
Bid For Blue	Gold Land	Moscow Road
1992
Sabre Rattler	Saint Express	Nominator
1991
Another Episode	Fair Crack	Regal Chimes

1990-1988
1990
Mujadil	Sir Harry Hardman	Poets Cove
1989
Old Alliance	Lord Glen	Croft Imperial
1988
Shuttlecock Corner	Paley Prince	That's The One

The Roses Stakes is a Listed flat horse race in Great Britain open to two-year-old horses. It is run at York over a distance of 5 furlongs (1,006 metres), and it is scheduled to take place each year in August. It is currently held on the last day of York's four-day Ebor Festival meeting.

== Winners since 1900 ==
Year	Winner	Jockey	Trainer	Time
1900	Alruna	Fred Rickaby	Percy Peck
1901	St Windeline	Fred Rickaby	Harry Enoch	1:02.40
1902	Skyscraper	Danny Maher	John Watson	1:02.00
1903
1904	Verdiana	Danny Maher	George Lambton
1905	Kilruddery	Danny Maher	George Lambton
1906	Saxham	Herbert Jones	Charles Archer
1907	Lesbia	Danny Maher	George Blackwell
1908	Vivid	Danny Maher	George Blackwell	1:01.40
1909	Whisk Broom	Skeets Martin	Jack Joyner
1910	Prince San	Herbert Randall	Atty Persse
1911	Merry Maiden	Billy Higgs	Willie Waugh
1912	Craganour	William Saxby	Jack Robinson
1913	Stornoway	Frank Wootton	Richard Wootton	0:59.60
1914-18	No Race
1919	Dynamo	Herbert Robbins	George Dundas
1920	Bettina	Fred Slade	Percy Linton
1921	Golden Corn	Bernard Carslake	Hugh Powney	1:01.00
1922	Portumna	Joe Childs	Hugh Powney	1:01.00
1923	Cape Horn	Albert Whalley	Charles Marsh	1:02.00
1924	Dalmagarry	Fred Winter Sr.	Frank Hartigan	1:01.20
1925	Moti Mahal	Bernard Carslake	Richard Dawson	1:01.00
1926	Fourth Hand	Harry Beasley Jr.	Atty Persse	1:01.40
1927	Romp	Bernard Carslake	Charles Peck	1:04.80
1928	Torbuie	Bobby Jones	Joseph Lawson	1:01.40
1929	Hakem	Michael Beary	Richard Dawson	1:00.00
1930	Portlaw	Harry Beasley Jr.	Atty Persse	1:00.60
1931	Spenser	Bobby Jones	Joseph Lawson	1:03.40
1932	Versicle	Tommy Weston	George Lambton	1:01.60
1933	Turbotin	Michael Beary	Frank Butters	1:00.80
1934	Hyndford Bridge	Sir Gordon Richards	Frank Bullock	0:58.20
1935	Wheatfield	Steve Donoghue	Richard Dawson	1:02.20
1936	Royal Romance	Billy Nevett	Matthew Peacock	1:02.40
1937	Khan Bahadur	Sir Gordon Richards	Frank Butters	0:59.00
1938	Panorama	Rufus Beasley	Cecil Boyd-Rochfort	0:58.60
1939	Illuminate	Bernard Carslake	Atty Persse	1:01.20
1940-44	No Race
1945	Lincoln Imp	Eph Smith	Jack Jarvis	1:00.40
1946	Goldsborough	Michael Beary	Robert Colling	1:01.80
1947	Fair Dinah	Charlie Smirke	Ted Lambton	0:59.00
1948	Three Weeks	Edgar Britt	Cecil Boyd-Rochfort	0:59.00
1949	Blackwell	Jimmy Thompson	Ernie Davey	0:59.60
1950	Turks Reliance	Sir Gordon Richards	Bobby Jones	1:00.20
1951	Euphrates	Sir Gordon Richards	Norman Bertie	0:59.80
1952	Tessa Gillian	Bill Rickaby	Jack Jarvis	1:00.40
1953	King's Evidence	Eph Smith	Ted Leader	0:59.60
1954	Panalley	Tommy Gosling	Paddy Prendergast	1:04.80
1955	Star Of India	Eph Smith	Ted Leader	0:59.80
1956	Picture Light	Eph Smith	Ted Leader	1:03.20
1957	Troubadour	Manny Mercer	George Colling	1:03.40
1958	Tudor Melody	Eddie Hide	Richard Peacock	1:02.60
1959	Sing Sing	Doug Smith	Jack Watts	0:59.00
1960	Ambergris	Lester Piggott	Harry Wragg	1:00.60
1961	Bow Tie	Doug Smith	Jack Watts	1:00.40
1962	Polybius	Garnet Bougoure	Paddy Prendergast	1:01.80
1963	Althrey Don	Russ Maddock	Pat Rohan	1:01.00
1964	Tamino	Ron Hutchinson	Gordon Smyth	1:00.20
1965	Kew	Ron Hutchinson	Frank Armstrong	1:01.20
1966	Florescence	Lester Piggott	Frank Armstrong	1:02.40
1967	Destiny Day	Bill Williamson	Paddy Prendergast	1:02.40
1968	Crooner	Brian Taylor	Jack Jarvis	1:01.40
1969	Brianstan	Geoff Lewis	John Sutcliffe	1:00.60
1970	Blue Butterfly	Joe Mercer	Paddy Prendergast	1:05.00
1971	Mansingh	Lester Piggott	Fulke Johnson Houghton	1:02.60
1972	Sanford Lad	Tony Murray	Ryan Price	0:59.20
1973	Louisan	Christy Roche	Paddy Prendergast	1:00.80
1974	Paris Review	Tony Murray	Jeremy Tree	1:00.65
1975	Petipa	Christy Roche	Paddy Prendergast	0:59.60
1976	Haveroid	Lester Piggott	Neil Adam	1:00.10
1977	Music Maestro	Greville Starkey	Michael Stoute	1:03.42
1978	Abdu	Pat Eddery	Bill O'Gorman	1:00.63
1979	Courtier	Dennis McKay	T Marshall	1:02.90
1980	Marwell	Lester Piggott	Michael Stoute	1:01.77
1981	Jester	Steve Cauthen	Barry Hills	1:03.43
1982	Cat O'Nine Tails	Brian Rouse	Ryan Price	1:01.24
1983	Petorius	Walter Swinburn	Michael Stoute	0:59.49
1984	Vaigly Oh	Steve Cauthen	John Sutcliffe	0:59.65
1985	Hallgate	Kevin Hodgson	Sally Hall	1:00.19
1986	Carol's Treasure	Brent Thomson	Barry Hills	0:59.48
1987	Colmore Row	Bruce Raymond	Ron Boss	1:03.09
1988	Shuttlecock Corner	George Duffield	Paul Felgate	0:57.84
1989	Old Alliance	Pat Eddery	Jeremy Tree	0:58.56
1990	Mujadil	Willie Carson	Robert Armstrong	0:58.82
1991	Another Episode	John Carroll	Jack Berry	1:00.85
1992	Sabre Rattler	Pat Eddery	Jack Berry	0:58.99
1993	Bid For Blue	Walter Swinburn	Richard Hannon Sr.	1:00.15
1994	Raah Algharb	Walter Swinburn	Michael Stoute	0:59.55
1995	Mubhij	Willie Carson	Barry Hills	0:59.01
1996	Janib	Richard Hills	Harry Thomson Jones	0:59.46
1997	Bay Prince	John Carroll	Mick Channon	1:00.30
1998	Red Prairie	Micky Fenton	Michael Bell	0:58.48
1999	Buy Or Sell	John Carroll	Tim Easterby	1:00.46
2000	Bouncing Bowdler	Kevin Darley	Mark Johnston	0:59.10
2001	Pepperoni	Michael Roberts	Tim Easterby	0:58.84
2002	Sir Albert (Note: The 2002 winner Sir Albert was later exported to Hong Kong and renamed Progressing Times)	Olivier Peslier	Jeremy Noseda	0:59.59
2003	Howick Falls	Frankie Dettori	David Loder	0:58.47
2004	Dance Night	Graham Gibbons	Bryan McMahon	1:02.13
2005	Tabaret	Dean McKeown	Richard Whitaker	0:57.88
2006	Not For Me	John Egan	Tim Pitt	0:58.78
2007	Captain Gerrard	Ryan Moore	Bryan Smart	1:00.30
2008	Abandoned due to waterlogging
2009	Star Rover	John Egan	David Evans	0:57.33
2010	New Planet	Kieren Fallon	John Quinn	0:58.93
2011	My Propeller	Frankie Dettori	Peter Chapple-Hyam	0:58.41
2012	Hoyam	Jamie Spencer	Michael Bell	1:00.22
2013	Hot Streak	Jamie Spencer	Kevin Ryan	1:01.22
2014	Mind of Madness	Jamie Spencer	David Brown	0:58.58
2015	Shadow Hunter	Phillip Makin	Paul D'Arcy	0:59.20
2016	Big Time Baby	Frankie Dettori	Tom Dascombe	0:57.11
2017	Sound And Silence	James Doyle	Charlie Appleby	0:59.19
2018	Well Done Fox	Jim Crowley	Richard Hannon Jr.	0:58.90
2019	Alligator Alley	Donnacha O'Brien	Joseph O'Brien	0:57.69
2020	Acklam Express	Tom Marquand	Nigel Tinkler	0:59.48
2021	Atagirl	Daniel Tudhope	Karl Burke	0:58.59
2022	Treasure Trove	Billy Lee	Paddy Twomey	0:57.71
2023	Inquisitively	William Buick	Kevin Philippart De Foy	0:58.65
2024	Tropical Storm	Oisin Murphy	Andrew Balding	0:58.18
2025	Revival Power	David Allan	Tim Easterby	0:57.73

== See also ==
- Horse racing in Great Britain
- List of British flat horse races
