= Prix du Petit Couvert =

- Class: Group 3
- Location: Longchamp Racecourse; Paris, France
- Inaugurated: 1867
- Race type: Flat / Thoroughbred
- Sponsor: Qatar
- Website: france-galop.com

Race information
- Distance: 1,000 metres (5f)
- Surface: Turf
- Track: Straight
- Qualification: Three-years-old and up
- Weight: 56 kg (3yo); 56½ kg (4yo+); Allowances; 1½ kg for fillies and mares Penalties; 3½ kg for Group 1 winners * 3½ kg if two Group 2 wins * 2½ kg if one Group 2 win * 2½ kg if two Group 3 wins * 1½ kg if one Group 3 win * * since January 1
- Purse: €80,000 (2021); 1st: €40,000

Prix du Petit Couvert
2025
Monteille	Rayevka	Ponntos

Previous years
2024
Pradaro	Electric Storm	Rogue Lightning
2023
Coeur De Pierre	Ponntos	Asymmetric
2022
Berneuil	Coeur De Pierre	Royal Aclaim
2021
Berneuil	Collinsbay	Wild Majesty

2020-2011
2020
Air De Valse	Wooded	Lady In France
2019
Glass Slippers	Shades Of Blue	Gold Vibe
2018
Tantheem	City Light	Muthmir
2017
Lady Macapa	Gold Vibe	Fashion Queen
2016
Just Glamorous	Marsha	Goldream
2015
Move In Time	Gengis	Mirza
2014
Mirza	Move In Time	Caledonia Lady
2013
Mirza	Dibajj	Catcall
2012
Monsieur Joe	Inxile	Flash Mash
2011
Prohibit	Mar Adentro	Hamish McGonagall

2010-2001
2010
Swiss Diva	Bluster	Mar Adentro
2009
War Artist	Stern Opinion	Bluster
2008
Only Answer	Rock Harmonie	Stern Opinion
2007
Tax Free	Derison	Kourka
2006
Majestic Missile	Peace Offering	Biniou
2005
Nipping	Maltese Falcon	Miss Emma
2004
Pivotal Point	The Tatling	Chineur
2003
Repertory	Traou Mad	Melkior
2002
Ziria	Dananeyev	Porlezza
2001
Repertory	Dancing Mystery	Monkston Point

2000-1991
2000
Repertory	Lincoln Dancer	El Gran Lode
1999
Manzor	Nuclear Debate	Repertory
1998
Bishops Court	Easycall	Repertory
1997
Hever Golf Rose	Kistena	Midnight Escape
1996
Don't Worry Me	Croft Pool	Titus Livius
1995
Millyant	Royale Figurine	Bruttina
1994
Millyant	Princely Hush	Imperial Bailiwick
1993
Lavinia Fontana	Palacegate Episode	Zieten
1992
Wixon	Keen Hunter	Dauberval
1991
Ski Chief	Archway	Dream Talk

The Prix du Petit Couvert is a Group 3 flat horse race in France open to thoroughbreds aged three years or older. It is run at Longchamp over a distance of 1,000 metres (about 5 furlongs), and it is scheduled to take place each year in September.

== History ==
The event was originally held at Chantilly, and it is named after a crossroads in Chantilly Forest. It was established in 1867, and was initially an 800-metre race for horses aged two or older. It was run in the second half of October.

The Prix du Petit Couvert was staged at Longchamp in 1880, and extended to 1,000 metres in 1881. It took place at Longchamp again in 1900.

Longchamp became the race's usual venue in 1907, and from this point its distance was 1,100 metres. It was abandoned throughout World War I, with no running from 1914 to 1918. It reverted to 1,000 metres in 1921.

The Prix du Petit Couvert was cancelled twice during World War II, in 1939 and 1940. It was held at Maisons-Laffitte in 1943 and Le Tremblay in 1944.

The race was closed to two-year-olds and switched to September in 2002. It now serves as a trial for the following month's Prix de l'Abbaye de Longchamp.

== Records ==
Most successful horse (3 wins):

- Fine Art – 1944, 1945, 1946
- Repertory – 2000, 2001, 2003

Leading jockey (7 wins):

- Roger Poincelet – Fine Art (1944, 1945, 1946), Damnos (1948), Palariva (1956), L'Epinay (1960, 1962)
- Yves Saint-Martin – La Sega (1961), Texanita (1963), Silver Shark (1965), Sun Sun (1968), Manjam (1979), Park Romeo (1981), Bold Apparel (1983)

Leading trainer (9 wins):

- François Mathet – Reinata (1955), Edellic (1958, 1959), La Sega (1961), Texanita (1963, 1964), Silver Shark (1965), Sun Sun (1968), Moubariz (1974)

Leading owner (7 wins):

- Edmond Blanc – La Negligente (1889), Fantasia (1891), Manitou (1897), Mauvezin (1899), Caius (1902), Fils du Vent (1909), Porte Maillot (1911)

== Winners since 1980 ==
Year	Winner	Age	Jockey	Trainer	Owner	Time
1980	Greenway	2	Freddy Head	Alec Head	Jacques Wertheimer
1981	Park Romeo	5	Yves Saint-Martin	Herbert Cohn	Leonie McNitt
1982	Kind Music	3	Freddy Head	Robert Collet	Bendar bin M. Al Kabir	1:01.20
1983	Bold Apparel	3	Yves Saint-Martin	Robert Collet	Owen Helman
1984	Parioli	3	Maurice Philipperon	John Cunnington Jr.	Danny Arnold
1985	Miss Stanford	4	Tony Ives	Börje Olsson	Elizabeth Thurdin
1986	Parioli	5	Maurice Philipperon	John Cunnington Jr.	Danny Arnold
1987	Sizzling Melody	3	Richard Hills	Lord John FitzGerald	Mary Watt
1988	Canango	4	Guy Guignard	Michael Stoute	Etti Plesch	0:59.60
1989	Lugana Beach	3	Steve Cauthen	David Elsworth	Ray Richards	0:56.40
1990	Run and Gun	2	Cash Asmussen	Robert Collet	Ecurie Promethee	1:02.40
1991	Ski Chief	3	Thierry Jarnet	André Fabre	Zenya Yoshida	0:59.90
1992	Wixon	2	Freddy Head	François Boutin	Allen Paulson	1:00.90
1993	Lavinia Fontana	4	Frankie Dettori	Con Collins	Cyril Humphris	1:01.50
1994	Millyant	4	Cash Asmussen	Rae Guest	Chris Mills	0:59.80
1995	Millyant	5	Cash Asmussen	Rae Guest	Chris Mills	0:56.90
1996	Don't Worry Me	4	Alain Junk	Guy Henrot	Jean-François Gribomont	0:57.40
1997	Hever Golf Rose	6	Cash Asmussen	Joe Naughton	Hever Racing Club	0:59.30
1998	Bishops Court	4	Jimmy Fortune	Lynda Ramsden	David Brotherton	1:03.40
1999	Manzor	2	Olivier Peslier	Xavier Nakkachdji	Daniel Wildenstein	1:00.60
2000	Repertory	7	Richard Hughes	Malcolm Saunders	Malcolm Saunders	0:59.40
2001	Repertory	8	Fergus Sweeney	Malcolm Saunders	Malcolm Saunders	1:00.90
2002	Ziria	3	Dominique Boeuf	Carlos Laffon-Parias	Leonidas Marinopoulos	0:56.60
2003	Repertory	10	Tom McLaughlin	Malcolm Saunders	Malcolm Saunders	0:56.90
2004	Pivotal Point	4	Frankie Dettori	Peter Makin	Ray Bernard	0:56.50
2005	Nipping	3	Christophe Soumillon	Robert Collet	Richard Strauss	0:55.50
2006	Majestic Missile	5	Christophe Soumillon	William Haggas	Flying Tiger Partnership	0:56.00
2007	Tax Free	5	Adrian Nicholls	David Nicholls	Ian Hewitson	0:55.80
2008	Only Answer	4	Olivier Peslier	André Fabre	Wertheimer et Frère	0:56.30
2009	War Artist	6	Olivier Peslier	James Eustace	Rupert Plersch	0:56.50
2010	Swiss Diva	4	Ioritz Mendizabal	David Elsworth	Lordship Stud	0:57.50
2011	Prohibit	6	Jim Crowley	Robert Cowell	Dasmal / Rix / Barr et al.	0:55.35
2012	Monsieur Joe	5	Olivier Peslier	Robert Cowell	Helen Checkley	0:56.35
2013 (dh)	Mirza; Dibajj	6; 3	William Buick; Antoine Hamelin	Rae Guest; Alain de Royer-Dupré	Chris Mills; A Al Maddah	0:58.40
2014	Mirza	7	Frankie Dettori	Rae Guest	Chris Mills	0:55.68
2015	Move In Time	7	Daniel Tudhope	David O´Meara	A Turton, J Blackburn & R Bond	0:57.30
2016	Just Glamorous	3	Pierre-Charles Boudot	Ronald Harris	Robert & Nina Bailey	0:56.30
2017	Lady Macapa	4	Luke Morris	Clive Cox	Michael Johnson & John Law	0:59.89
2018	Tantheem	3	Aurelien Lemaitre	Freddy Head	Hamdan Al Maktoum	0:56.20
2019	Glass Slippers	3	Tom Eaves	Kevin Ryan	Bearstone Stud	0:55.77
2020	Air de Valse	4	Ronan Thomas	Corine Barande-Barbe	Corine Barande-Barbe	0:55.34
2021	Berneuil	4	Christophe Soumillon	Carlos Lerner	Antoine Gilibert	0:56.34
2022	Berneuil	5	Ronan Thomas	Carlos & Yann Lerner	Antoine Gilibert	0:56.30
2023	Coeur De Pierre	7	Tony Piccone	Mauricio Delcher Sanchez	Ecurie Pandora Racing & A Mouknass	0:54.83
2024	Pradaro	9	Aurelien Lemaitre	Sofie Lanslots	Stal Vie En Rose	0:57.24

== Earlier winners ==
- 1867:
- 1868: Manette
- 1869: Mademoiselle de Fligny
- 1870: Viva
- 1871: Le Monde
- 1872:
- 1873:
- 1874: Saltimbanque
- 1875: Marmiton
- 1876: Pensacola
- 1877: Pensacola
- 1878: Virginie
- 1879: Mademoiselle Mars
- 1880: Belgirate
- 1881: Pistache
- 1882: Ontario
- 1883:
- 1884: Metropole
- 1885: Artois
- 1886: Entrechat
- 1887: Modiste
- 1888: Master Albert
- 1889: La Negligente
- 1890: Paradisia
- 1891: Fantasia
- 1892:
- 1893: Sylphine
- 1894:
- 1895:
- 1896: Aunt Minie
- 1897: Manitou
- 1898:
- 1899: Mauvezin
- 1900: Wilhelmina
- 1901: Limousin
- 1902: Caius
- 1903:
- 1904: Morning Dew
- 1905:
- 1906: Syphon
- 1907: Princess Margaret
- 1908: Prestissimo
- 1909: Fils du Vent
- 1910: Garance
- 1911: Porte Maillot
- 1912: Amadou / Radial *
- 1913: La Malfiera
- 1914–18: no race
- 1919: La Chiffa
- 1920: Maskara
- 1921: Honeysuckle
- 1922: Sir Gallahad
- 1923: Heldifann
- 1924: Niceas
- 1925: Mackwiller
- 1926: Addis Ababa
- 1927: Gerbert
- 1928: Echappade
- 1929: Clarawood
- 1930: Democratie
- 1931: Epitaphe
- 1932: Faria
- 1933: Shining Tor
- 1934: Bao Dai
- 1935: Limac
- 1936: Ethiopie
- 1937: Aziyade
- 1938: Iskandar
- 1939–40: no race
- 1941: Wigombirou
- 1942: Dogat
- 1943: Wigombirou
- 1944: Fine Art
- 1945: Fine Art
- 1946: Fine Art
- 1947: Solina
- 1948: Damnos
- 1949:
- 1950:
- 1951: Pareo
- 1952: Pierrot Bleu
- 1953: Vamarie
- 1954: Vamarie
- 1955: Reinata
- 1956: Palariva
- 1957:
- 1958: Edellic
- 1959: Edellic
- 1960: L'Épinay
- 1961: La Sega
- 1962: L'Épinay
- 1963: Texanita
- 1964: Texanita
- 1965: Silver Shark
- 1966: Yours
- 1967: Yours
- 1968: Sun Sun
- 1969: Pentathlon
- 1970: Calahorra
- 1971: Deep Diver
- 1972: Rambling Rose
- 1973: D'Urberville
- 1974: Moubariz
- 1975: Realty
- 1976: Girl Friend
- 1977: Girl Friend
- 1978: Polyponder
- 1979: Manjam

* The 1912 race was a dead-heat and has joint winners.

== See also ==
- List of French flat horse races
