= Luke Morris =

English jockey

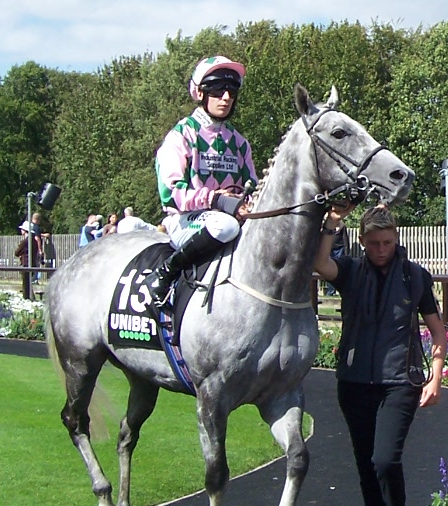
- Luke Morris riding at Newmarket, August 2019

Personal information
- Born: 20 October 1988 (age 37)
- Occupation: Jockey

Horse racing career
- Sport: Horse racing

Significant horses
- Marsha; Alpinista

Luke Morris (born 20 October 1988) is an English jockey who competes in flat racing.

== Background ==
Morris comes from a racing background, his grandfather Joe Tate, uncle Jason Tate and cousin Ryan Tate all being jockeys. He was born in Oxford and moved to Newmarket as a child. He began riding out for Michael Bell while still at school. He completed a course at the British Racing School and became apprenticed to Bell.

== Career ==
Morris rode his first winner in November 2005 and his first big race victory came on Juniper Girl in the Northumberland Plate in 2007. He gained his first Group race win on Gilt Edge Girl in the Group 3 Ballyogan Stakes at Leopardstown in June 2010. In October 2010 Gilt Edge Girl gave Morris his first Group 1 victory when they won the Prix de l'Abbaye de Longchamp at Longchamp in Paris. In 2012 he became first jockey for Newmarket trainer Sir Mark Prescott. It was the Prescott trained Marsha who provided Morris with his first British Group 1 victory, when winning the Nunthorpe Stakes at York August 2017 in a photo finish against Frankie Dettori's Lady Aurelia.

Between April 2021 and October 2022, Morris rode the Prescott-trained Alpinista to eight consecutive victories, including the Group 2 Lancashire Oaks in July 2021, and then six Group 1 races in Germany, France and Britain, culminating with a win in the 2022 Prix de l'Arc de Triomphe.

Morris has ridden more than 100 winners every season since 2011 and has been all weather champion jockey on three occasions.

== Awards ==
In December 2022 Morris was awarded the Lester Piggott Honorary Award at the annual Lester Awards in recognition of his ride on Alpinista in the Prix de l'Arc de Triomphe.

== Major wins ==
(United Kingdom) Great Britain

- Nunthorpe Stakes - (1) - Marsha (2017)
- Yorkshire Oaks - (1) Alpinista (2022)

France

- Prix de l'Abbaye de Longchamp - (2) - Gilt Edge Girl (2010), Marsha (2016)
- Prix de l'Arc de Triomphe - (1) - Alpinista (2022)
- Prix de Royallieu - (1) - Consent (2025)
- Grand Prix de Saint-Cloud - (1) - Alpinista (2022)

Germany

- Grosser Preis von Berlin - (2) - Alpinista (2021), Tiffany (2026)
- Preis von Europa - (1) - Alpinista (2021)
- Grosser Preis von Bayern - (1) - Alpinista (2021)
