= Tim Easterby =

British racehorse trainer

Tim Easterby (born 13 September 1961) is a British racehorse trainer based in North Yorkshire.

Easterby took over the Habton Grange stables in North Yorkshire from his father, Peter Easterby, in February 1996. He has trained a Classic winner, Bollin Eric, in the 2002 St Leger Stakes at Doncaster and had Group 1 wins with Pipalong, Fayr Jag, Somnus, Winter Power and Art Power.

His father trained Sea Pigeon, the dual Champion Hurdle winner, who also landed two Chester Cups and, at the age of nine, defied top-weight of 10 st to win the 1979 Ebor Handicap at York. Peter Easterby also trained Night Nurse, who was successful in the Champion Hurdle on two occasions and in 1981 was narrowly denied a Cheltenham Gold Cup triumph by Little Owl, also trained by Peter Easterby.

Tim's uncle Mick Easterby is also a racehorse trainer.
