= Magna Grecia (horse) =

Thoroughbred racehorse trained in Ireland

- Racing silks of Derrick Smith (2nd colours)
- Sire: Invincible Spirit
- Grandsire: Green Desert
- Dam: Cabaret
- Damsire: Galileo
- Sex: Colt
- Foaled: 25 February 2016
- Country: Ireland
- Colour: Bay
- Breeder: Woodnook Farm
- Owner: Susan Magnier, Derrick Smith, Michael Tabor & Flaxman Stables
- Trainer: Aidan O'Brien
- Record: 6: 3-1-0
- Earnings: £457,666

Major wins
- Vertem Futurity Trophy (2018); 2000 Guineas (2019)

Magna Grecia (foaled 25 February 2016) is an Irish Thoroughbred racehorse. He showed top class form as a two-year-old in 2018 when he won two of his three races including the Group 1 Vertem Futurity Trophy. On his three-year-old debut he won the 2000 Guineas Stakes.

== Background ==
Magna Grecia is a bay colt with a white sock on his left foreleg bred in Ireland by Woodnook Farm. In November 2016 the foal was put up for auction at Tattersalls and was bought for 340,000 guineas by Michael Magnier, Mayfair and P&R Doyle. He entered the ownership of John Magnier's Coolmore Stud (represented by Susan Magnier, Michael Tabor and Derrick Smith) in partnership with the Niarchos family's Flaxman Stables. Like most Coolmore horses he was sent into training with Aidan O'Brien at Ballydoyle.

He was sired by the Haydock Sprint Cup winner Invincible Spirit, who has produced many other major winners including Kingman, Charm Spirit, Mayson, Fleeting Spirit, Moonlight Cloud and Lawman. Magna Grecia's dam Cabaret, who was owned by Coolmore, won two races including the Silver Flash Stakes, and went on to become a very successful broodmare who also produced St Mark's Basilica. She was descended from the British broodmare Fiddlededee who was the ancestor of Mountain Lodge, Might and Power, Lucky Owners and Sariska.

== Racing career ==
=== 2018: two-year-old season ===
Magna Grecia made his racecourse debut on 30 September over seven furlongs at Naas Racecourse when he started the 2/1 favourite for a maiden race. Ridden by Ryan Moore he raced in third before moving up on the inside to take the lead approaching the final furlong, drew away from his rivals in the closing stages and won "comfortably" by three and a half lengths. Two weeks later the colt was stepped up in class and sent to England for the Group 3 Autumn Stakes over one mile at Newmarket Racecourse in which he was ridden by his trainer's son Donnacha O'Brien and started the 3/1 second favourite behind the French colt Persian King. The last quarter mile saw a prolonged struggle between Persian King and Magna Grecia, with the favourite prevailing by a neck. The other O'Brien-trained runners Circus Maximus and Western Australia came home third and fourth. Aidan O'Brien said that he was "delighted" with the colt's performance.

On 27 October Magna Grecia was back in England for the Group 1 Vertem Futurity Trophy over one mile on good to soft ground at Doncaster Racecourse. With Donnacha O'Brien in the saddle he was made the 2/1 favourite ahead of the John Gosden-trained Turgenev in a ten-runner field which included Circus Maximus, Western Australia, Phoenix of Spain, Raakib Alhawa (Haynes, Hanson and Clark Conditions Stakes) and Great Scot (Ascendant Stakes). After racing in mid-division as Western Australia set the pace he began to make progress in the last quarter mile and moved up to challenge for the lead entering the final furlong. In a rough, crowded and closely contested finish, which saw five horses almost level with 100 yards left to run he prevailed by a head from Phoenix of Spain, just ahead of Western Australia, Circus Maximus and Great Scot. The result was only confirmed after a lengthy inquiry by the racecourse stewards into possible interference between the first two finishers. Donnacha O'Brien said "There just was a little bit of a bump... but I don't think there was much in it. He gave me a good feel through the race. He will be better next year. I just had to keep him balanced and he toughed it out in the last furlong".

=== 2019: three-year-old season ===
On his three-year-old debut Magna Grecia was one of seventeen colts to contest the 211th running of the 2000 Guineas over the Rowley Mile at Newmarket Racecourse and was partnered again by Donnacha O'Brien. He started the 11/2 second favourite behind his stablemate Ten Sovereigns while the other contenders included Madhmoon (Juvenile Stakes), Skardu (Craven Stakes), Advertise, Royal Marine, Shine So Bright (European Free Handicap) and Great Scot. While the bulk of the field raced up the centre of the track Magna Grecia, Shine So Bright and the 66/1 outsider King of Change raced down the stands-side (the left-hand side from the jockeys' viewpoint). In the last quarter mile it became clear that the stands-side trio held a distinct advantage and Magna Grecia overtook Shine So Bright to take the lead approaching the final furlong. Magna Grecia forged clear in the closing stages to win by two and a half lengths from King of Change, with Skardu finishing best of the centre group in third ahead of Madhmoon and Ten Sovereigns. Aidan O'Brien, who was winning the race for a record tenth time said "He's a lovely, straightforward horse and he's done very well over the winter. He's got very pacy and he's a strong traveller now. We were a little bit worried that he was over there by himself when all the more fancied horses were on the other side. Donnacha knew the horse, he was riding him in all his work, so I didn’t have to explain much to him."

Three weeks after his win at Newmarket Magna Grecia was ridden by Moore when he started 6/4 joint favourite with Too Darn Hot for the Irish 2,000 Guineas at the Curragh. Racing on firmer ground he tracked the leaders but was unable to quicken in the last quarter mile and came home fifth behind Phoenix of Spain, Too Darn Hot, Decrypt and Skardu. He sustained a tendon injury in the race and was off the track until the autumn.

Donnacha O'Brien took the ride when Magna Grecia made his comeback in the Queen Elizabeth II Stakes over the straight mile course at Ascot Racecourse on 19 October. Racing on heavy ground he started at odds of 13/2 but tired badly in the last quarter mile and came home fifteenth of the sixteen runners behind King of Change, beaten more than thirty lengths by the winner.

== Pedigree ==
Pedigree of Magna Grecia (IRE), bay colt, 2016
Sire Invincible Spirit (IRE) 1997	Green Desert (USA); 1983	Danzig	Northern Dancer (CAN)
Sire Invincible Spirit (IRE) 1997	Green Desert (USA); 1983	Danzig	Pas de Nom
Sire Invincible Spirit (IRE) 1997	Green Desert (USA); 1983	Foreign Courier	Sir Ivor
Sire Invincible Spirit (IRE) 1997	Green Desert (USA); 1983	Foreign Courier	Courtly Dee
Sire Invincible Spirit (IRE) 1997	Rafha (GB); 1987	Kris	Sharpen Up
Sire Invincible Spirit (IRE) 1997	Rafha (GB); 1987	Kris	Doubly Sure
Sire Invincible Spirit (IRE) 1997	Rafha (GB); 1987	Eljazzi (IRE)	Artaius (USA)
Sire Invincible Spirit (IRE) 1997	Rafha (GB); 1987	Eljazzi (IRE)	Border Bounty (GB)
Dam Cabaret (IRE) 2007	Galileo; 1998	Sadler's Wells (USA)	Northern Dancer (CAN)
Dam Cabaret (IRE) 2007	Galileo; 1998	Sadler's Wells (USA)	Fairy Bridge
Dam Cabaret (IRE) 2007	Galileo; 1998	Urban Sea (USA)	Miswaki
Dam Cabaret (IRE) 2007	Galileo; 1998	Urban Sea (USA)	Allegretta (GB)
Dam Cabaret (IRE) 2007	Witch of Fife (USA); 1993	Lear Fan	Roberto
Dam Cabaret (IRE) 2007	Witch of Fife (USA); 1993	Lear Fan	Wac
Dam Cabaret (IRE) 2007	Witch of Fife (USA); 1993	Fife (IRE)	Lomond (USA)
Dam Cabaret (IRE) 2007	Witch of Fife (USA); 1993	Fife (IRE)	Fiddle Faddle (Family: 6-e)
