= Eqtidaar =

Thoroughbred racehorse (2015–2023)

- Racing silks of Hamdan Al Maktoum
- Sire: Invincible Spirit
- Grandsire: Green Desert
- Dam: Madamy
- Damsire: Acclamation
- Sex: Colt
- Foaled: 4 May 2015
- Died: 26 April 2023 (aged 7)
- Country: Ireland
- Colour: Bay
- Breeder: Shadwell Estate
- Owner: Hamdan Al Maktoum
- Trainer: Michael Stoute
- Record: 8: 2-1-0
- Earnings: £311,763

Major wins
- Commonwealth Cup (2018)

Eqtidaar (4 May 2015 – 26 April 2023) was an Irish-bred, British-trained Thoroughbred racehorse. He showed promise as two-year-old when he won a maiden race on his debut and then finished fourth in the Sirenia Stakes. In the following year he was beaten in the Pavilion Stakes and the Carnarvon Stakes before recording his biggest win in the Commonwealth Cup. In two subsequent races that year he ran poorly in the July Cup and the Haydock Sprint Cup.

== Background ==
Eqtidaar was a bay horse bred in Ireland by his owner, Hamdan Al Maktoum's Shadwell Estate. The colt was sent into training with Michael Stoute at Newmarket, Suffolk.

He was sired by the Haydock Sprint Cup winner Invincible Spirit, who has produced many other major winners including Kingman, Charm Spirit, Mayson, Fleeting Spirit, Moonlight Cloud and Lawman. Eqtidaar's dam Madany won two of her eleven races and went on to produce the 2000 Guineas runner-up Massaat. She was a descendant of the French mare Greenback, who was the female-line ancestor of many good winners including Toulon.

== Racing career ==
=== 2017: two-year-old season ===
Eqtidaar made his racecourse debut in a maiden race over six furlongs at Nottingham Racecourse on 18 August and started the 6/4 favourite in an eight-runner field. Ridden by Jim Crowley he accelerated into a clear lead in the final furlong and won "readily" by two and a half lengths from Mountain Guard. Dane O'Neill took the ride three weeks later when the colt was stepped up in class to contest the Group 3 Sirenia Stakes on the synthetic Polytrack surface at Kempton Park Racecourse and came home fourth behind the favoured Invincible Army.

=== 2018: three-year-old season ===
Eqtidaar began his second campaign in the Group 3 Pavilion Stakes over six furlongs at Ascot Racecourse on 2 May. With O'Neill in the saddle he took the lead a quarter of a mile from the finish but was overtaken by Invincible Army in the closing stages and beaten into second place. In the Listed Carnarvon Stakes at Newbury Racecourse 17 days later he was made second favourite but was never able to reach the leaders after a slow start and came home fourth behind Never Back Down.

Crowley took the ride on 22 June at Royal Ascot when the colt was stepped up to Group 1 class to contest the Commonwealth Cup and started at odds of 12/1 in a 22 runner field. The Phoenix Stakes winner Sioux Nation went off favourite ahead of Invincible Army, Equilateral and Sands of Mali while the other runners included Heartache (Flying Childers Stakes), Cardsharp (July Stakes), Actress (Ballyogan Stakes) and Unfortunately (Prix Morny). Most of the runners, including Eqtidaar, raced up the centre of the straight while a smaller group of six raced up the stands-side. After racing in mid-division Eqtidaar made progress in the last quarter mile, took the lead inside the final furlong and held on well in the closing stages to win by half a length from Sands of Mali. After the race Crowley said "I knew Eqtidaar had potential. He'd been working fantastic at home and I knew today he had a great chance." Michael Stoute commented "We've always liked this horse. It didn't go right for him in the Pavilion Stakes and he was on the wrong side of the track at Newbury last time. He's progressing nicely."

Three weeks after his win at Ascot, Eqtidaar was pitted against older sprinters for the first time in the July Cup at Newmarket Racecourse. Although he briefly looked likely to threaten the leaders he was unable to sustain his challenge and came home ninth behind U S Navy Flag. After a lengthy break the colt returned to the track in September for the Haydock Sprint Cup in which he was ridden by Danny Tudhope and started a 20/1 outsider. He never looked likely to win and finished eleventh of the twelve runners behind The Tin Man beaten eighteen lengths by the winner.

=== 2019: four-year-old season ===
On his first and only appearance as a four-year-old Eqtidaar contested the King Richard III Stakes at Leicester Racecourse on 27 April in which he came home fifth of the six runners behind Hey Gaman.

== Stud career ==
Eqtidaar was retired from racing to become a breeding stallion at his owner's Nunnery Stud in Thetford, Norfolk. On 26 April 2023 it was announced that the stallion had been euthanised. According to a statement by Shadwell "Eqtidaar, our Group 1 Commonwealth Cup winner and promising young sire, has been put down upon veterinary advice following complications from a recent health condition... He will be sorely missed by all those who worked with him."

== Pedigree ==
Pedigree of Eqtidaar (IRE), bay colt, 2015
Sire Invincible Spirit (IRE) 1997	Green Desert (USA); 1983	Danzig	Northern Dancer (CAN)
Sire Invincible Spirit (IRE) 1997	Green Desert (USA); 1983	Danzig	Pas de Nom
Sire Invincible Spirit (IRE) 1997	Green Desert (USA); 1983	Foreign Courier	Sir Ivor
Sire Invincible Spirit (IRE) 1997	Green Desert (USA); 1983	Foreign Courier	Courtly Dee
Sire Invincible Spirit (IRE) 1997	Rafha (GB); 1987	Kris	Sharpen Up
Sire Invincible Spirit (IRE) 1997	Rafha (GB); 1987	Kris	Doubly Sure
Sire Invincible Spirit (IRE) 1997	Rafha (GB); 1987	Eljazzi (IRE)	Artaius (USA)
Sire Invincible Spirit (IRE) 1997	Rafha (GB); 1987	Eljazzi (IRE)	Border Bounty (GB)
Dam Madany (IRE) 2008	Acclamation (GB); 1999	Royal Applause	Waajib (IRE)
Dam Madany (IRE) 2008	Acclamation (GB); 1999	Royal Applause	Flying Melody (IRE)
Dam Madany (IRE) 2008	Acclamation (GB); 1999	Princess Athena (IRE)	Ahonoora (GB)
Dam Madany (IRE) 2008	Acclamation (GB); 1999	Princess Athena (IRE)	Shopping Wise
Dam Madany (IRE) 2008	Belle de Cadix; 1992	Law Society (USA)	Alleged
Dam Madany (IRE) 2008	Belle de Cadix; 1992	Law Society (USA)	Bold Bikini
Dam Madany (IRE) 2008	Belle de Cadix; 1992	Gourgandine	Auction Ring (USA)
Dam Madany (IRE) 2008	Belle de Cadix; 1992	Gourgandine	North Forland (FR) (Family: 3-c)
