= Shalaa =

Irish-bred Thoroughbred racehorse

- Racing silks of Al Shaqab Racing
- Sire: Invincible Spirit
- Grandsire: Green Desert
- Dam: Ghurra
- Damsire: War Chant
- Sex: Stallion
- Foaled: 23 February 2013
- Country: Ireland
- Colour: Bay
- Breeder: Mogeely Stud
- Owner: Al Shaqab Racing
- Trainer: John Gosden
- Record: 8:6-0-0
- Earnings: £460,122

Major wins
- July Stakes (2015); Richmond Stakes (2015); Prix Morny (2015); Middle Park Stakes (2015); Bengough Stakes (2016)

Awards
- Top-rated British two-year-old (2015)

Shalaa (foaled 23 February 2013) is an Irish-bred, British-trained Thoroughbred racehorse. In 2015, he was beaten on his debut but won his next five races, including the July Stakes, Richmond Stakes, Prix Morny, and Middle Park Stakes. His second season was badly disrupted by injury, although he did win the Bengough Stakes.

== Background ==
Shalaa is a bay colt with a narrow white blaze bred by the County Cork-based Mogeely Stud. He was sired by the Haydock Sprint Cup winner Invincible Spirit who has produced many other major winners including Kingman, Charm Spirit, Mayson, Fleeting Spirit, Moonlight Cloud and Lawman. Shalaa's dam Ghurra won once in England and twice in California from twenty starts between 2004 and 2007. Ghurra was a descendant of the broodmare Moonstone, making her a distant relative of Nocturnal Spree, Moonax and the Irish 1,000 Guineas winner Even Star.

As a foal in November 2013, the colt was sent to the Tattersalls sales and sold for 100,000 guineas. In the following October he was again put up for auction at Tattersalls and bought for 170,000 guineas by the bloodstock agent Charles Gordon-Watson. Shalaa entered the ownership of Joann Al Thani's Al Shaqab Racing and was sent into training with John Gosden at Newmarket, Suffolk.

== Racing career ==
=== 2015: two-year-old season ===
==== Spring ====
In his first season, Shalaa was ridden in all but one of his races by the Italian veteran Frankie Dettori. The colt made his debut in a six-furlong race at Newbury Racecourse on 16 May and started the 7/2 second favourite in a field which included five previous winners. He swerved badly exiting the stalls, and was never in contention, finishing last of the eight runners behind Birchwood. Two weeks later, he contested a maiden race over the same distance at Newmarket Racecourse and recorded his first success, taking the lead a furlong out and winning by two lengths from Fang.

==== Summer ====
On 9 July, Shalaa stepped up in class and started a 14/1 outsider for the Group Two July Stakes over six furlongs at Newmarket. He was ridden by Robert Havlin as Dettori was partnering the more fancied Eltezam, who was made co-favourite alongside Areen and Steady Pace (second and third in the Windsor Castle Stakes at Royal Ascot). Shala tracked the leaders before taking the lead approaching the final furlong and prevailed by a length from Steady Pace despite veering sharply to the left in the closing stages. Havlin said "Before he ran this year we thought he could be a Coventry horse. He just needed a couple of days away from the yard to learn how to do everything right. He put it all together today and did it well. He travelled with a lot of ease through the race and it was just a matter of pressing the button. When he stopped quickening, he started idling, so there was a bit left in the tank".

Dettori was back in the saddle when the colt started 11/8 favourite for the Group Two Richmond Stakes at Goodwood Racecourse on 30 July. Steady Pace was again in opposition, whilst the other contenders included Log Out Island (second in the Norfolk Stakes), Tasleet (winner of the Listed Rose Bowl Stakes) and Riflescope (Dragon Stakes). Shalaa led from the start, went clear of the field entering the final furlong and won by two and a quarter lengths from Tasleet despite being eased down by Dettori in the final strides. After the race the colt was initially regarded as a 2000 Guineas prospect but Gosden explained that he was more likely to be campaigned over sprint distances. He commented "Thank goodness we resisted going to Royal Ascot for the Coventry Stakes because I don’t think he was ready for that, mentally. He reminds me a lot of Oasis Dream. I don’t see him being a miler, I see him staying at six and that wonderful new race, the Commonwealth Cup, as being a huge target for him next year. He's so fast and he enjoys sprinting, so let him sprint."

==== Autumn ====
On his next appearance, Shalaa was sent to France and moved up to Group One level for the Prix Morny over 1200 metres at Deauville Racecourse on 23 August. He was made the 1/2 favourite ahead of the Richard Hannon Jr.-trained Gutaifan, who had won the Prix Robert Papin four weeks earlier, and the Prix de Cabourg winner Tourny. Shalaa and Gutaifan disputed the lead before the favourite moved away from his rival in the last 200 metres to win by one and three-quarters lengths. After the race, Dettori described Shalaa as "the best two-year-old I’ve sat on in my life... I am not exaggerating". Gosden commented, "He has done it very well, he is very fast and he's beat Gutaifan, a good horse, in second. We will look towards the Middle Park. No curveballs, just the Middle Park, that will do us". The runner-up went on to win the Flying Childers Stakes at Doncaster.

On 26 September, Shalaa started 1/2 favourite in a seven-runner field for the Group One Middle Park Stakes at Newmarket. The best of his rivals appeared to be the Gimcrack Stakes winner Ajaya and the Coventry Stakes winner Buratino. Dettori sent him into the lead from the start before opening up a clear advantage a furlong out. He held off the late challenge of Buratino to win by half a length, with Steady Pace staying on to take third ahead of Ajaya. Dettori commented, "He's got tremendous speed and he is the fastest two-year-old I've ridden. I haven't met a horse fast enough to lead him" whilst Gosden said "He's very, very fast – the fastest two-year-old I've trained... He's got a good mind on him too, which is very important".

=== 2016: three-year-old season ===
As a three-year-old, Shalaa was trained to engage in a sprint campaign with the Commonwealth Cup as his major objective. On 15 April, however it was announced that the colt had sustained a pelvic injury in a routine training gallop and would miss the first half of the season. Al Shaqab's racing manager, Harry Herbert, described the development as "immensely disappointing".

More than a year after his last appearance, Shalaa returned with a win in the Listed Bengough Stakes over six furlongs at Ascot on 1 October, leading from the start and winning by a neck from the four-year-old filly Mehronissa. After the race, Gosden said "He was just full of himself and I told Frankie he was carrying his stick just for balance – not to use it. He will come back for the Champion Sprint but we know softer ground compromises a horse who is all about pure speed". In the British Champions Sprint Stakes two weeks later he started the 4/1 joint favourite in a thirteen-runner field. Racing on good ground he raced prominently on the stands-side but faded in the last quarter mile and finished tenth behind The Tin Man, beaten seven and a half lengths by the winner.

== Assessment and honors ==
In January Shalaa was officially rated the second-best European two-year-old of 2015 and the best juvenile trained in Britain. His mark of 121 placed him three pounds behind the Irish-trained Air Force Blue and one pound ahead the filly Minding.

== Stud career ==
Shalaa acts as a shuttle stallion between Al Shaquab stud in France and Arrowfield Stud in Australia.

=== Notable progeny ===
c = colt, f = filly, g = gelding

Foaled	Name	Sex	Major Wins
2018	No Speak Alexander	f	Matron Stakes

== Pedigree ==
Pedigree of Shalaa (IRE), bay colt, 2013
Sire Invincible Spirit (IRE) 1997	Green Desert (USA); 1983	Danzig	Northern Dancer
Sire Invincible Spirit (IRE) 1997	Green Desert (USA); 1983	Danzig	Pas de Nom
Sire Invincible Spirit (IRE) 1997	Green Desert (USA); 1983	Foreign Courier	Sir Ivor
Sire Invincible Spirit (IRE) 1997	Green Desert (USA); 1983	Foreign Courier	Courtly Dee
Sire Invincible Spirit (IRE) 1997	Rafha (GB); 1987	Kris	Sharpen Up
Sire Invincible Spirit (IRE) 1997	Rafha (GB); 1987	Kris	Doubly Sure
Sire Invincible Spirit (IRE) 1997	Rafha (GB); 1987	Eljazzi	Artaius
Sire Invincible Spirit (IRE) 1997	Rafha (GB); 1987	Eljazzi	Border Bounty
Dam Ghurra (USA) 2002	War Chant (USA); 1997	Danzig	Northern Dancer
Dam Ghurra (USA) 2002	War Chant (USA); 1997	Danzig	Pas de Nom
Dam Ghurra (USA) 2002	War Chant (USA); 1997	Hollywood Wildcat	Kris S
Dam Ghurra (USA) 2002	War Chant (USA); 1997	Hollywood Wildcat	Miss Wildcatter
Dam Ghurra (USA) 2002	Futuh (USA); 1988	Diesis	Sharpen Up
Dam Ghurra (USA) 2002	Futuh (USA); 1988	Diesis	Doubly Sure
Dam Ghurra (USA) 2002	Futuh (USA); 1988	Hardship	Drone
Dam Ghurra (USA) 2002	Futuh (USA); 1988	Hardship	Hard and Fast (Family: 4-g)

- Shalaa is inbred 3 × 3 to Danzig, meaning that this stallion appears twice in the third generation of his pedigree. He is also inbred 4 × 4 to the broodmare Doubly Sure and stud Sharpen Up.
