= Hooray (horse) =

British Thoroughbred racehorse

- Racing silks of Cheveley Park Stud
- Sire: Invincible Spirit
- Grandsire: Green Desert
- Dam: Hypnotize
- Damsire: Machiavellian
- Sex: Mare
- Foaled: 17 March 2008
- Country: United Kingdom
- Colour: Bay
- Breeder: Cheveley Park Stud
- Owner: Cheveley Park Stud
- Trainer: Mark Prescott
- Record: 13: 5-0-1
- Earnings: £208,443

Major wins
- Lowther Stakes (2010); Sirenia Stakes (2010); Cheveley Park Stakes (2010); Surrey Stakes (2011)

Awards
- Top-rated European two-year-old filly (2010)

Hooray (foaled 17 March 2008) is a British Thoroughbred racehorse and broodmare. Bred and owned by the Cheveley Park Stud she won five of her thirteen races in a racing career which lasted from June 2010 until October 2011. In 2010 she was rated the best filly of her age in Europe when she won the Lowther Stakes, the Sirenia Stakes (in record time) and the Cheveley Park Stakes (by four and a half lengths). She was not so successful as a three-year-old, recording her only success in the Surrey Stakes. At the end of the year she returned to Cheveley Park to become a broodmare and produced her first foal in 2013.

== Background ==
Hooray is a bay mare with a small white star and white socks on her hind feet bred by David and Patricia Thompson's Newmarket-based Cheveley Park Stud. She was sired by the Haydock Sprint Cup winner Invincible Spirit who has produced many other major winner including Kingman, Mayson, Fleeting Spirit, Moonlight Cloud and Lawman. Her dam Hypnotize was a successful racemare whose two win for Cheveley Park Stud including the Listed Star Stakes in 1999. She was also a half-sister to the Cherry Hinton Stakes winner Dazzle and a descendant of the American broodmare Self Control, making her a distant relative of the Kentucky Oaks winner Open Mind.

The filly was sent into training with Mark Prescott at the Heath House Stable in Newmarket. She was ridden in all but one of her races by Seb Sanders.

== Racing career ==
=== 2010: two-year-old season ===
Hooray made her racecourse in a maiden race over six furlongs on the polytrack surface at Kempton Park on 2 June 2010. Starting the 7/2 second favourite in a ten-runner field, she pulled hard in the early stages before taking the lead a furlong from the finish and winning by two and a half lengths from the Paul Cole-trained Jetfire. She was then moved up in class for the Group Three Albany Stakes at Royal Ascot two weeks later. The field split into two groups one either side of the wide Ascot straight with Hooray racing among the leaders of the group on the far side (the right hand side from the jockeys' viewpoint). She was hampered inside the final furlong and dropped back to finish eighth of the twenty-two runners behind Memory, who won by a head from Margot Did. In the Cherry Hinton Stakes at Newmarket Racecourse in July she was retrained by Sanders in the early stages before taking the lead inside the final furlong. She was overtaken in the final strides and finished third behind Memory and the Princess Margaret Stakes winner Soraaya.

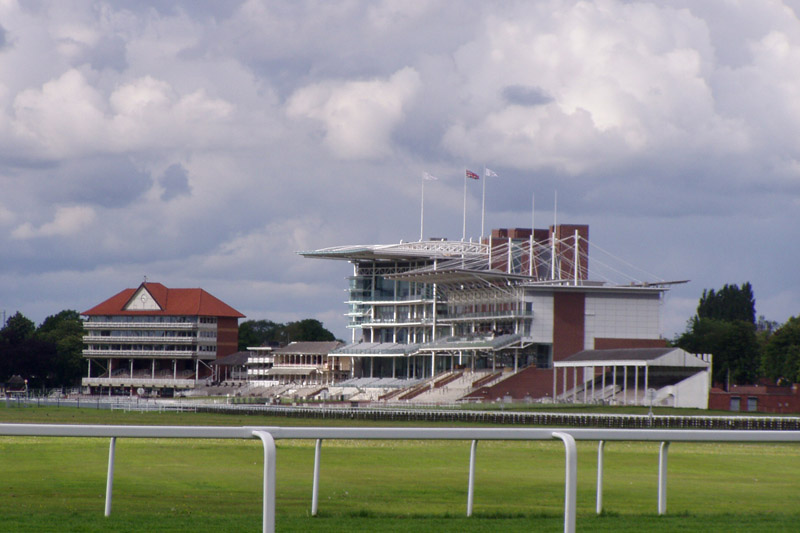
York Racecourse, where Hooray won the Lowther Stakes in 2010

Hooray was then dropped in class and started 6/5 favourite for the Listed St Hugh's Stakes at Newbury Racecourse on 7 August. She appeared to make a good recovery after being hampered at the start, but was never in serious contention and finished sixth behind Electric Waves. Despite her defeat, the filly was moved back up in class for the Group Two Lowther Stakes at York Racecourse six days later. The John Gosden-trained Maqaasid (winner of the Queen Mary Stakes) was made favourite ahead of Margot Did and Rimth (runner-up in the Dick Poole Fillies' Stakes) with Hooray next in the betting on 11/1. In a change of tactics, Sanders sent the filly into the lead from the start and set the pace before accelerating in the last quarter mile. She held off the challenge of Margot Did to win by three quarters of a length with a gap of two and a quarter lengths back to Rimth in third. Hooray returned to the polytrack at Kempton on 4 September when she was matched against male opposition in the Group Three Sirenia Stakes and started second favourite behind the Godolphin colt Signs in the Sand. As in the Lowther she led from the start and accelerated away from her opponents in the closing stages to win "very readily" by three and a quarter lengths from Reckless Reward, with the favourite six lengths back in third. The winning time of 1:11.45 was a track record for a two-year-old. Sanders commented "She picked up really well. I thought she won well at York but she stepped up again. She's learning her job all the time and I hope she's still improving".

On her seventh and final appearance of the year Hooray was moved up to Group One class for the Cheveley Park Stakes at Newmarket on 1 October. Maqaasid, Margot Did and Rimth were again in opposition whilst the other runners included Wild Wind (runner-up in the C. L. Weld Park Stakes), Khor Sheed (Empress Stakes) and Ragsah (runner-up in the Firth of Clyde Stakes). Despite doubts about her ability to handle the soft ground, Hooray started 7/2 favourite ahead of Wild Wind (5/1), Khor Sheed (6/1) and Ragsah (6/1). Hooray took the lead from the start and looked the likely winner two furlongs from the finish. She drew right away from her rivals in the closing stages and won by four and a half lengths from Rimth, with Maqaasid taking third ahead of Ragsah and Margot Did. Prescott commented "She's kept improving and I think since we stopped restraining her and let her go on, it's been the making of her. I thought she was very impressive". He also stated that although the filly's owners were keen to go for the 1000 Guineas he did not believe that Hooray would stay the one mile distance.

Although she was beaten by Misty for Me in the poll for the Cartier Champion Two-year-old Filly, Hooray was officially rated the best two-year-old filly in Europe, ten pounds behind the top colts Frankel and Dream Ahead.

=== 2011: three-year-old season ===
In early 2011, Prescott expressed some concerns about the filly's progress, noting that she did not seem to have grown since the previous autumn. On her first appearance of the season, Hooray was one of eighteen fillies to contest the 198th running of the 1000 Guineas over the Rowley Mile at Newmarket and started at odds of 9/1. She led until the last quarter mile but then weakened and finished eighth behind Blue Bunting. The filly was then dropped in class and distance for the Listed Surrey Stakes over seven furlongs at Epsom Downs Racecourse on 3 June. Starting the odds-on favourite, she raced in second place behind the colt Lord of the Stars before taking the lead two furlongs out and went two lengths clear. Lord of the Stars rallied in the closing stages but Hooray always looked the likely victor and held on to win by one and a quarter lengths.

Hooray failed to reach the first three in her four subsequent races. In the Golden Jubilee Stakes at Royal Ascot she raced prominently and kept on in the closing stages to finish seventh of the sixteen runners, less than four lengths behind Society Rock. On 18 August she started favourite for the Listed Fairy Bridge Stakes at Tipperary Racecourse but ran poorly and finished unplaced behind the John Oxx-trained Alanza. Ten days later (ridden by Stevie Donohoe) she started joint-favourite for the Supreme Stakes at Goodwood Racecourse and dead-heated for fourth place behind Libranno. On her final appearance she started a 25/1 outsider finished unplaced in the Diadem Stakes at Ascot on 15 October.

== Breeding record ==
Hooray was retired from racing to become a broodmare for Cheveley Park Stud. Her first foal was First Rate, a bay colt, foaled in 2013 and sired by Kyllachy. He was beaten in two races as a two-year-old in 2015.

== Pedigree ==
Pedigree of Hooray (GB), bay filly, 2008
Sire Invincible Spirit (IRE) 1997	Green Desert (USA); 1983	Danzig	Northern Dancer
Sire Invincible Spirit (IRE) 1997	Green Desert (USA); 1983	Danzig	Pas de Nom
Sire Invincible Spirit (IRE) 1997	Green Desert (USA); 1983	Foreign Courier	Sir Ivor
Sire Invincible Spirit (IRE) 1997	Green Desert (USA); 1983	Foreign Courier	Courtly Dee
Sire Invincible Spirit (IRE) 1997	Rafha (GB); 1987	Kris	Sharpen Up
Sire Invincible Spirit (IRE) 1997	Rafha (GB); 1987	Kris	Doubly Sure
Sire Invincible Spirit (IRE) 1997	Rafha (GB); 1987	Eljazzi	Artaius
Sire Invincible Spirit (IRE) 1997	Rafha (GB); 1987	Eljazzi	Border Bounty
Dam Hypnotize (GB) 1997	Machiavellian (USA); 1987	Mr. Prospector	Raise a Native
Dam Hypnotize (GB) 1997	Machiavellian (USA); 1987	Mr. Prospector	Gold Digger
Dam Hypnotize (GB) 1997	Machiavellian (USA); 1987	Coup de Folie	Halo
Dam Hypnotize (GB) 1997	Machiavellian (USA); 1987	Coup de Folie	Raise the Standard
Dam Hypnotize (GB) 1997	Belle et Deluree (USA); 1985	The Minstrel	Northern Dancer
Dam Hypnotize (GB) 1997	Belle et Deluree (USA); 1985	The Minstrel	Fleur
Dam Hypnotize (GB) 1997	Belle et Deluree (USA); 1985	Sophisticated Girl	Stop The Music
Dam Hypnotize (GB) 1997	Belle et Deluree (USA); 1985	Sophisticated Girl	Close Control (Family: A29)

- Hooray is inbred 4 × 4 to Northern Dancer which means that this stallion appears twice in the fourth generation of her pedigree.
