= Rosdhu Queen =

Irish-bred Thoroughbred racehorse

- Racing silks of Clipper Logistics
- Sire: Invincible Spirit
- Grandsire: Green Desert
- Dam: Green Minstrel
- Damsire: Green Tune
- Sex: Mare
- Foaled: 10 February 2010
- Country: Ireland
- Colour: Bay
- Breeder: Old Carhue & Graeng Bloodstock
- Owner: Clipper Logistics
- Trainer: William Haggas
- Record: 8: 4-0-0
- Earnings: £189,986

Major wins
- St Hugh's Stakes (2012); Lowther Stakes (2012); Cheveley Park Stakes (2012)

Rosdhu Queen (foaled 10 February 2010) is an Irish-bred, British-trained Thoroughbred racehorse and broodmare. In a racing career which lasted from July 2012 until August 2013 she won four of her eight races. As a two-year-old in 2012 she was one of the best fillies of her generation in Britain, winning all four of her races including the St Hugh's Stakes, Lowther Stakes and Cheveley Park Stakes. She failed to win in 2013 but finished fourth in the Fred Darling Stakes and produced arguably her best effort when finishing fifth in the Diamond Jubilee Stakes. At the end of her racing career she was sold to become a broodmare for the Coolmore Stud.

== Background ==
Rosdhu Queen is a bay mare with a white snip and a white coronet on her right hind foot bred in Ireland by Old Carhue & Graeng Bloodstock. She was sired by the Haydock Sprint Cup winner Invincible Spirit who has produced many other major winner including Kingman, Mayson, Fleeting Spirit, Moonlight Cloud and Lawman. Her dam, Green Minstrel competed only as a two-year-old in 2000 but showed high-class form, winning two of her three races including the Prix d'Aumale. She was descended from Sparkalark, the grand-dam of the Irish 2,000 Guineas winner Flash of Steel.

As a foal, Rosdhu Queen was consigned by Rings View Stud to the Goffs sale in November 2010 and was bought for €120,000 by the bloodstock agency BBA Ireland. In August 2011, the yearling filly was offered for sale at Deauville but failed to reach her reserve price of €75,000. The filly entered the ownership of Clipper Logistics (a haulage company founded by Steve Parkin) and was sent into training with William Haggas at Newmarket, Suffolk.

== Racing career ==
=== 2012: two-year-old season ===
Rosdhu Queen made her racecourse debut in a five furlong maiden race at Ripon Racecourse on 21 July. Ridden by Philip Makin and starting at odds of 7/2, she disputed the lead from the start before going clear of her thirteen opponents to win by two and a half lengths. Ryan Moore took the ride when the filly was moved up in class for the St Hugh's Stakes on 17 August at Newbury Racecourse. She was made the 11/10 favourite against nine rivals headed by the Princess Margaret Stakes runner-up Sandreamer. After racing in second place Rosdhu Queen took the lead a furlong out and kept on well to win by three quarters of a length from Sound of Guns with Sandreamer a length away in third. Six days after her win at Newbury, the filly was moved up in class and distance for the Group Two Lowther Stakes over six furlongs at York Racecourse in which she was ridden by Richard Hughes. She started the 9/2 second favourite behind the Albany Stakes winner Newfangled whilst the other runners included Sandreamer, Baileys Jubilee (a Listed race winner in France) and the highly rated maiden race winners Pearl Sea and Badr Al Badoor. In a race run in heavy rain and a strong headwind, Rosdhu Queen took the lead from the start and was never seriously challenged, winning by one and three quarter lengths from Baileys Jubilee, with the 33/1 outsider Royal Rascal a head away in third place. After the race, Hughes said "The plan was to get her some cover but she hit the gate fast and I wasn't going to interfere with her after that. I got a soft lead and when I went for her she looked around a bit, but when I gave her a scalp she really ran. At the furlong pole I wasn't sure we'd get home, but at the post I felt she could have gone another 100 yards. I was really impressed with the way she picked up, she's a very speedy filly" Commenting on the filly's prompt return after winning at Newbury, Haggas explained "I don't normally run them back this quick. But Steve Parkin, who owns her, is a Yorkshireman as well – so what did we have to lose? We may as well have some fun, it's what we do it for. And she's pretty good".

For her final appearance as a two-year-old, Rosdhu Queen was moved up to Group One class for the Cheveley Park Stakes at Newmarket Racecourse on 29 September. In her fourth race, she had her fourth different jockey, being partnered by Johnny Murtagh. The Princess Margaret Stakes winner Maureen (ridden by Hughes), started 2/1 favourite with Rosdhu Queen the 4/1 second choice in an eleven-runner field. The other runners included The Gold Cheongsam (winner of her last three races including a £300,000 sales race at Doncaster), Winning Express (Dick Poole Fillies' Stakes), Sendyourlovetome (Grangecon Stud Stakes, Cherry Hinton Stakes), Ceiling Kitty (Queen Mary Stakes), Hoyam (Roses Stakes) and Baileys Jubilee. Murtagh immediately sent the filly to the front and raced along the far rail (the right hand side from the jockeys' viewpoint). Several challengers emerged in the closing stages but Rosdhu Queen kept on well under pressure to win by a length and a nose from Winning Express and Baileys Jubilee. Murtagh commented "She battled well and wasn't for passing. She's fast". Discussing the filly's stamina and future prospects, William Haggas said "I didn't think she'd stay six in the Lowther, but she went again when she needed to. Whether or not she's a Guineas filly I don't know, but why not?"

=== 2013: three-year-old season ===
Rosdhu Queen made her first appearance as a three-year-old in the Fred Darling Stakes (a trial race for the 1000 Guineas) over seven furlongs at Newbury on 20 April. Starting the 7/4 favourite she became unsettled in the starting stalls and after leading for most of the way ahe weakened in the closing stages and finished fourth of the ten runners behind Maureen. The filly was dropped to sprint distances in her three subsequent races, starting with the Diamond Jubilee Stakes at Royal Ascot in June. Matched against colts and older horses for the first time she again became upset in the stalls before finishing fifth of the eighteen runners behind Lethal Force, Society Rock, Krypton Factor and Gordon Lord Byron. Rosdhu Queen failed to reproduce her best form in her two remaining races, finishing last when favourite for the Summer Stakes in July and unplaced behind Jwala in the Nunthorpe Stakes in August.

In December 2013 Rosdhu Queen was auctioned Tattersalls December Mares Sale and was bought for 2.1 million guineas by Stephen Hillen Bloodstock, acting on behalf of the Coolmore Stud.

== Pedigree ==
Pedigree of Rosdhu Queen (GB), bay filly, 2010
Sire Invincible Spirit (IRE) 1997	Green Desert (USA); 1983	Danzig	Northern Dancer
Sire Invincible Spirit (IRE) 1997	Green Desert (USA); 1983	Danzig	Pas de Nom
Sire Invincible Spirit (IRE) 1997	Green Desert (USA); 1983	Foreign Courier	Sir Ivor
Sire Invincible Spirit (IRE) 1997	Green Desert (USA); 1983	Foreign Courier	Courtly Dee
Sire Invincible Spirit (IRE) 1997	Rafha (GB); 1987	Kris	Sharpen Up
Sire Invincible Spirit (IRE) 1997	Rafha (GB); 1987	Kris	Doubly Sure
Sire Invincible Spirit (IRE) 1997	Rafha (GB); 1987	Eljazzi	Artaius
Sire Invincible Spirit (IRE) 1997	Rafha (GB); 1987	Eljazzi	Border Bounty
Dam Green Minstrel (FR) 1998	Green Tune (USA); 1991	Green Dancer	Nijinsky
Dam Green Minstrel (FR) 1998	Green Tune (USA); 1991	Green Dancer	Green Valley
Dam Green Minstrel (FR) 1998	Green Tune (USA); 1991	Soundings	Mr. Prospector
Dam Green Minstrel (FR) 1998	Green Tune (USA); 1991	Soundings	Ocean's Answer
Dam Green Minstrel (FR) 1998	Shy Minstrel (USA); 1991	The Minstrel	Northern Dancer
Dam Green Minstrel (FR) 1998	Shy Minstrel (USA); 1991	The Minstrel	Fleur
Dam Green Minstrel (FR) 1998	Shy Minstrel (USA); 1991	Shy Bride	Blushing Groom
Dam Green Minstrel (FR) 1998	Shy Minstrel (USA); 1991	Shy Bride	Hartebeest (Family: 9-f)

- Rosdhu Queen was inbred 4 × 4 to Northern Dancer, meaning that this stallion appears twice in the fourth generation of her pedigree.
