= Charm Spirit =

Irish-bred Thoroughbred racehorse

- Racing silks of Abdullah bin Khalifa Al Thani
- Sire: Invincible Spirit
- Grandsire: Green Desert
- Dam: L'Enjoleuse
- Damsire: Montjeu
- Sex: Colt
- Foaled: 26 February 2011
- Country: Ireland
- Colour: Bay
- Breeder: Ecurie des Monceaux
- Owner: Abdullah bin Khalifa Al Thani
- Trainer: Freddy Head
- Record: 9:6-1-1

Major wins
- Prix Djebel (2014); Prix Paul de Moussac (2014); Prix Jean Prat (2014); Prix du Moulin (2014); Queen Elizabeth II Stakes (2014)

Charm Spirit (foaled 26 February 2011) is an Irish-bred, French-trained Thoroughbred racehorse. As a two-year-old he won one minor race but showed promise when finishing third in the Prix Jean-Luc Lagardère. In the following year he established himself as one of the best European colts of his generation with wins in the Prix Djebel, Prix Paul de Moussac, Prix Jean Prat, Prix du Moulin and Queen Elizabeth II Stakes.

== Background ==
Charm Spirit is a bay horse with no white markings bred in Ireland by Ecurie des Monceaux. He was sired by the Haydock Sprint Cup winner Invincible Spirit who has produced many other major winner including Kingman, Mayson, Fleeting Spirit, Moonlight Cloud and Lawman. Charm Spirit's dam L'Enjoleuse, won two minor races in France and was a descendant of the Canadian broodmare Ciboulette, making her a relative of L'Enjoleur, Fanfreluche, La Voyageuse and Holy Roman Emperor.

As a yearling, Charm Spirit was offered for sale at Deauville and was bought for €140,000 by Freddy Head. The horse entered the ownership of the Qatari Sheikh Abdullah bin Khalifa Al Thani and has been trained by Head during his racing career. He has been ridden in all but one of his races by Olivier Peslier.

== Racing career ==
=== 2013: two-year-old season ===
Charm Spirit made his racecourse debut in a maiden race over 1600 metres at Deauville Racecourse on 9 August and finished second to the André Fabre-trained favourite Golden Heritage. In September he recorded his first victory when winning the Prix de Melezes over 1400 metres at Longchamp Racecourse. He was then moved up in class for the Group One Prix Jean-Luc Lagardère over the same course and distance and started at odds of 7/1. He finished third of the eight runners beaten three quarters of a length and one and a quarter lengths by the favourite Karakontie and the Spanish colt Noozhoh Canarias.

=== 2014: three-year-old season ===
On his first appearance as a three-year-old, Charm Spirit won the Group Three Prix Djebel over 1400 metres at Maisons-Laffitte Racecourse, getting the better of Kiram, Imperiator and Bookrunner in a four-way photo-finish. The colt was then sent to England to contest the 2000 Guineas over the Rowley Mile at Newmarket Racecourse. In a very strong renewal of the classic he finished fifth behind Night of Thunder, Kingman, Australia and Shifting Power, with Noozhoh Canarias, Toormore, Kingston Hill, War Command, The Grey Gatsby, Bookrunner and Outstrip among the unplaced runners.

In June, Charm Spirit was dropped in class for the Group Three Prix Paul de Moussac over 1600 metres at Chantilly Racecourse. He started the 7/10 favourite despite conceding three pounds to his four opponents and won "cosily" by three quarters of a length from Salai. On 14 July, over the same course and distance, Charm Spirit and Shifting Power started joint-favourites for the Group One Prix Jean Prat. Racing on very soft ground, the colt stayed on strongly in the closing stages to win by a neck and three quarter of a length from Yuften and Shifting Power. Yuften was demoted to fourth for causing interference in the last 200 metres.

Charm Spirit was matched against older horses for the first time in the Prix du Moulin at Longchamp on 14 September and started the 11/2 third choice in the betting behind the British-trained colts Toronado and Night of Thunder. Ridden for the first time by Thierry Jarnet, he raced close to the leaders on the inside before taking the lead in the last 200 metres and winning by a head and a neck from Toronado and Night of Thunder. In October, Charm Spirit was sent to Britain for a second time to contest the Queen Elizabeth II Stakes at Ascot Racecourse. He was made the 5/1 third favourite behind Night of Thunder and the filly Integral in a field which also included Toormore, Kingsbarns, Tullius (Sandown Mile), Custom Cut (Joel Stakes), Captain Cat (Superior Mile) and Top Notch Tonto (runner-up in the previous year's race). Peslier tracked the leaders before "squeezing" through to take the lead a furlong out and won by half a length from Night of Thunder, with Toormore half a length further back in third. After the race, Freddy Head said "He is a much better horse now. I was worried about the tough Ascot mile and the ground, but he's a great warrior".

== Stud career ==
Charm Spirit stands at the Haras du Logis Saint-Germain stud, at a fee for 2023 of €5,000.

=== Notable progeny ===
c = colt, f = filly, g = gelding

Foaled	Name	Dam	Sex	Major wins
2020	Shaquille	Magic	c	Commonwealth Cup, July Cup

== Pedigree ==
Pedigree of Charm Spirit (IRE), bay colt, 2011
Sire Invincible Spirit (IRE) 1997	Green Desert (USA); 1983	Danzig	Northern Dancer
Sire Invincible Spirit (IRE) 1997	Green Desert (USA); 1983	Danzig	Pas de Nom
Sire Invincible Spirit (IRE) 1997	Green Desert (USA); 1983	Foreign Courier	Sir Ivor
Sire Invincible Spirit (IRE) 1997	Green Desert (USA); 1983	Foreign Courier	Courtly Dee
Sire Invincible Spirit (IRE) 1997	Rafha (GB); 1987	Kris	Sharpen Up
Sire Invincible Spirit (IRE) 1997	Rafha (GB); 1987	Kris	Doubly Sure
Sire Invincible Spirit (IRE) 1997	Rafha (GB); 1987	Eljazzi	Artaius
Sire Invincible Spirit (IRE) 1997	Rafha (GB); 1987	Eljazzi	Border Bounty
Dam L'Enjoleuse (IRE) 2002	Montjeu (IRE); 1996	Sadler's Wells	Northern Dancer
Dam L'Enjoleuse (IRE) 2002	Montjeu (IRE); 1996	Sadler's Wells	Fairy Bridge
Dam L'Enjoleuse (IRE) 2002	Montjeu (IRE); 1996	Floripedes	Top Ville
Dam L'Enjoleuse (IRE) 2002	Montjeu (IRE); 1996	Floripedes	Tout Cy
Dam L'Enjoleuse (IRE) 2002	Machaera (GB); 1993	Machiavellian	Mr. Prospector
Dam L'Enjoleuse (IRE) 2002	Machaera (GB); 1993	Machiavellian	Coup de Folie
Dam L'Enjoleuse (IRE) 2002	Machaera (GB); 1993	Somfas	What A Pleasure
Dam L'Enjoleuse (IRE) 2002	Machaera (GB); 1993	Somfas	Ciboulette (Family: 4-g)
