= Byerley Stud Stakes =

The Byerley Stud Stakes is the sponsored title of two horse races in Britain:

- The St Hugh's Stakes, run at Newbury in August
- The Radley Stakes, run at Newbury in October
