= Kingsbarns (Irish-bred horse) =

Irish-bred Thoroughbred racehorse

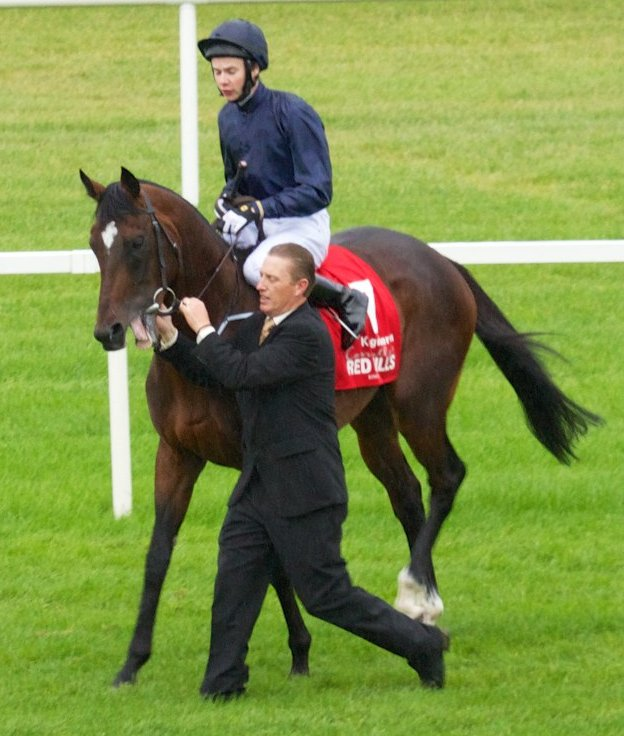
- Kingsbarns and Joseph O'Brien at Leopardstown in 2013
- Sire: Galileo
- Grandsire: Sadler's Wells
- Dam: Beltisaal
- Damsire: Belmez
- Sex: Colt
- Foaled: 20 February 2010
- Died: 16 May 2018
- Country: Ireland
- Colour: Bay
- Breeder: Ann Marie O'Brien
- Owner: Mrs John Magnier; Michael Tabor; Derrick Smith
- Trainer: Aidan O'Brien
- Record: 8: 2-1-2
- Earnings: £364,634

Major wins
- Racing Post Trophy (2012)

Kingsbarns (20 February 2010 – 16 May 2018) was an Irish Thoroughbred racehorse who won the Racing Post Trophy in 2012 on his second career start. He was owned by Mrs John Magnier, Michael Tabor and Derrick Smith and was trained by Aidan O'Brien.

== Background ==
Kingsbarns was a bay colt foaled on 20 February 2010 and bred by Ann Marie O'Brien, the wife of trainer Aidan O'Brien. Kingsbarns was the son of Epsom Derby winner and multiple Champion sire Galileo. Galileo has produced many top horses, including Cape Blanco, Frankel, Nathaniel, New Approach and Rip Van Winkle. Kingsbarns' dam, Beltisaal, is a daughter of King George VI and Queen Elizabeth Stakes winner Belmez.

== Racing career ==
=== 2012: two-year-old season ===
Kingsbarns did not race until October 2012, where he easily won a one mile maiden race at Navan Racecourse. Under jockey Joseph O'Brien he beat Risk Return by seven lengths. Having originally not been entered he was supplemented for the Racing Post Trophy at the cost of £17,500.

After being supplemented he was priced as big as 8/1 to win the race, but received significant support and started as the 15/8 favourite. Again ridden by O'Brien, he took the lead with over one furlong left to run. He then pulled away to win the race by one and three quarter lengths from the Richard Hannon Sr. trained Van Der Neer, who just beat Steeler for second place. After his victory he was made favourite for the 2013 Epsom Derby and second favourite (behind Dawn Approach) for the 2000 Guineas. In his only two runs as a two-year-old he earned £130,831.

In the 2012 European Thoroughbred Racehorse Rankings, he was given a rating of 118, putting him in second place, six pounds below the top-rated Dawn Approach.

=== 2013: three-year-old season ===
In April 2013, Kingsbarns was ruled out of the 2000 Guineas after failing to recover sufficiently from a foot infection. He made his belated seasonal debut in the Irish Champion Stakes at Leopardstown Racecourse on 7 September. He was settled in fourth place by Joseph O'Brien, but dropped away before the turn into the straight and was pulled up in a race won by The Fugue. Kingsbarns was next entered in the Queen Elizabeth II stakes on British Champions Day at Ascot Racecourse. Racing at odds of 14–1, he ran third behind runaway winner Olympic Glory. After the race, Kingsbarns' trainer Aidan O'Brien said: "I'm delighted with that. It all went wrong for him in the spring and this was like our first run of the season. I'd imagine that will be it for this year and we'll look forward to next season with him."

=== 2014: four-year-old season ===
Kingsbarns began his third season in the Listed Heritage Stakes at Leopardstown in April. Despite being less than fully fit he was made the 4/6 favourite but finished third of the five runners behind the John Oxx-trained Qewy. The colt was off the racecourse for four and a half months before returning in the Royal Whip Stakes at the Curragh in August, when he finished second, beaten half a length by his stable companion Hall of Mirrors. In September, he was sent to France for the Prix Foy in which he finished fifth of the six runners behind Ruler of the World. On 18 October, Kingbarns ran for the second time in the Queen Elizabeth II Stakes at Ascot. He was among the leaders until the final furlong when he weakened rapidly and finished sixth behind Charm Spirit.

== After retirement ==
Kingsbarns entered South African-based Drakenstein Stud Farm. He died from colic on 16 May 2018.

== Pedigree ==
Pedigree of Kingsbarns, bay colt, 2010
Sire Galileo (IRE) b. 1998	Sadler's Wells (USA) b. 1981	Northern Dancer* b. 1961	Nearctic
Sire Galileo (IRE) b. 1998	Sadler's Wells (USA) b. 1981	Northern Dancer* b. 1961	Natalma
Sire Galileo (IRE) b. 1998	Sadler's Wells (USA) b. 1981	Fairy Bridge b. 1975	Bold Reason
Sire Galileo (IRE) b. 1998	Sadler's Wells (USA) b. 1981	Fairy Bridge b. 1975	Special
Sire Galileo (IRE) b. 1998	Urban Sea (USA) ch. 1989	Miswaki ch. 1978	Mr. Prospector
Sire Galileo (IRE) b. 1998	Urban Sea (USA) ch. 1989	Miswaki ch. 1978	Hopespringseternal
Sire Galileo (IRE) b. 1998	Urban Sea (USA) ch. 1989	Allegretta ch. 1978	Lombard
Sire Galileo (IRE) b. 1998	Urban Sea (USA) ch. 1989	Allegretta ch. 1978	Anatevka
Dam Beltisaal (FR) b. 1994	Belmez (USA) b. 1987	El Gran Senor b. 1981	Northern Dancer*
Dam Beltisaal (FR) b. 1994	Belmez (USA) b. 1987	El Gran Senor b. 1981	Sex Appeal
Dam Beltisaal (FR) b. 1994	Belmez (USA) b. 1987	Grance Note b. 1982	Top Ville
Dam Beltisaal (FR) b. 1994	Belmez (USA) b. 1987	Grance Note b. 1982	Val de Grace
Dam Beltisaal (FR) b. 1994	Ittisaal (GB) b. 1987	Caerleon b. 1980	Nijinsky
Dam Beltisaal (FR) b. 1994	Ittisaal (GB) b. 1987	Caerleon b. 1980	Foreseer
Dam Beltisaal (FR) b. 1994	Ittisaal (GB) b. 1987	House Tie b. 1975	Be Friendly
Dam Beltisaal (FR) b. 1994	Ittisaal (GB) b. 1987	House Tie b. 1975	Mesopotamia

Note: b. = Bay, ch. = Chestnut

* Kingsbarns was inbred 3 × 4 to Northern Dancer, meaning that the stallion appears once in the third generation and once in the fourth generation of his pedigree.
