= Invincible Spirit =

Irish-bred Thoroughbred racehorse

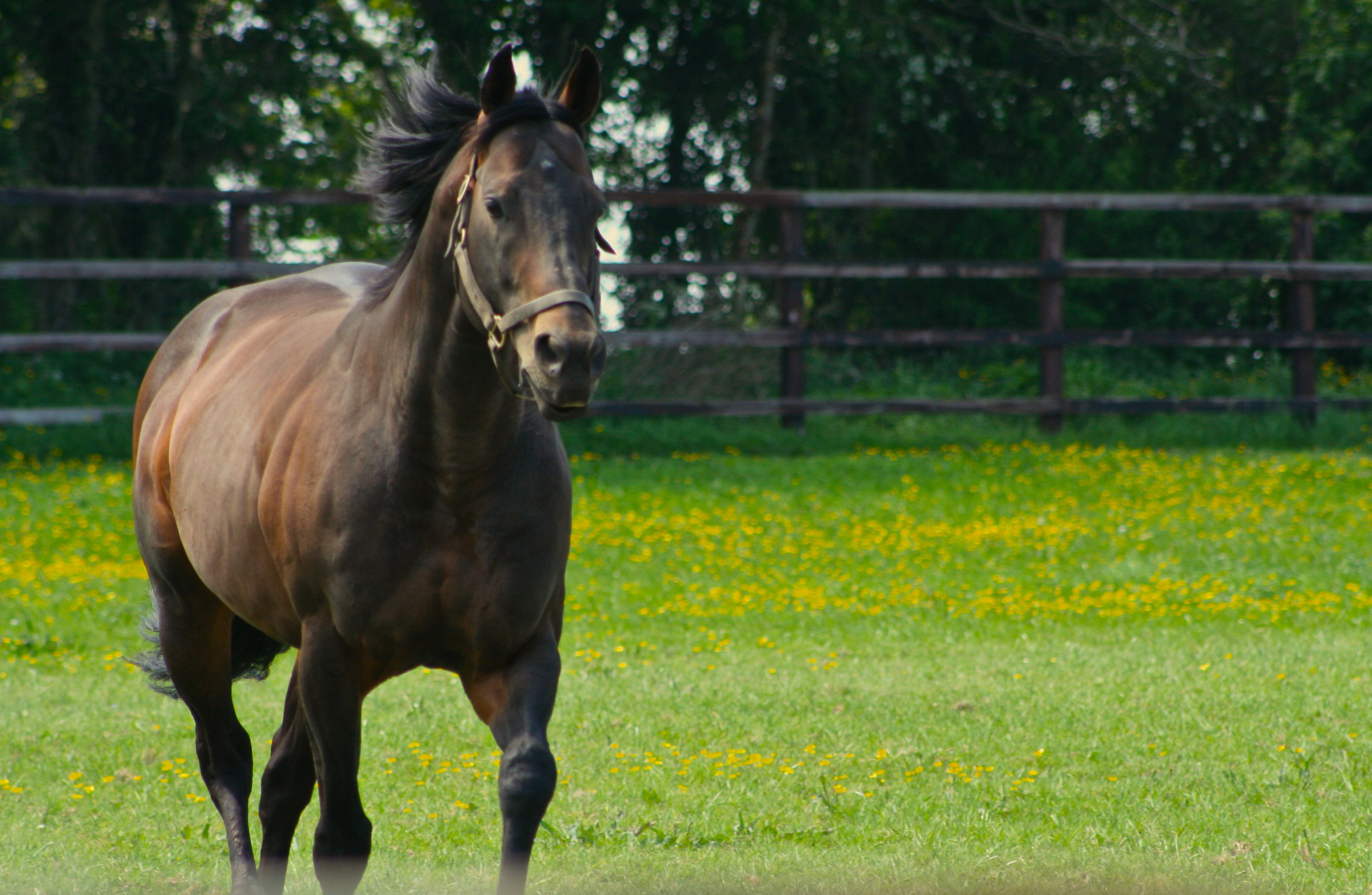
- Invincible Spirit in 2012.
- Sire: Green Desert
- Grandsire: Danzig
- Dam: Rafha
- Damsire: Kris
- Sex: Stallion
- Foaled: 17 February 1997 (age 28)
- Country: Ireland
- Colour: Bay
- Breeder: Nawara Stud
- Owner: Prince A. A. Faisal
- Trainer: John Dunlop
- Jockey: Gary Stevens; Richard Quinn; Mick Kinane; Pat Eddery; Kieren Fallon; John Carroll
- Record: 17: 7–1–1
- Earnings: £247,786

Major wins
- Ripon Champion 2-y-o Trophy (1999); Hackwood Stakes (2001); MacDonagh Boland Stakes (2001); Duke of York Stakes (2002); Haydock Sprint Cup (2002)

Invincible Spirit (foaled 17 February 1997) is an Irish-bred, British-trained Thoroughbred racehorse. As a two-year-old, he won two out of his four races, but as a three-year-old, he only raced twice and was unsuccessful on both occasions. In 2001, he achieved two victories, one of which was his first Group race win in the MacDonagh Boland Stakes. He won the Duke of York Stakes in 2002, and the Group 1 Haydock Sprint Cup at the end of that year. Following his retirement from racing, he emerged as one of Ireland's prominent stallions, siring notable progeny such as Fleeting Spirit, Kingman, Charm Spirit, Lawman, Mayson and Moonlight Cloud. Invincible Spirit was trained by John Dunlop and owned by Prince A. A. Faisal.

== Background ==
Invincible Spirit is a bay horse bred by Nawara Stud and foaled on 17 February 1997. He was sired by Green Desert, a sprinter who achieved victories in the July Cup and Haydock Sprint Cup in 1986. Following his racing career, Green Desert became a highly successful stallion, producing numerous top horses including Cape Cross, Desert Prince, Oasis Dream, Owington and Sheikh Albadou. Invincible Spirit's dam was Rafha, a daughter of Kris. Rafha, also owned by Prince Faisal, secured a win in the Prix de Diane in 1990. Invincible Spirit was trained by John Dunlop.

== Racing career ==
=== 1999: Two-year-old season ===
Invincible Spirit made his racecourse debut on 11 July 1999 in a six-furlong maiden race at Haydock Park. Despite a slow start, he finished the race in third place, behind the winner Trouble Mountain and the second-placed Shinbone Alley. Seventeen days later, he participated in another maiden race at Goodwood. Starting as the favourite, he positioned himself towards the rear initially but made a strong move through the field to take the lead with one furlong remaining. He pulled away to secure victory by one and a half lengths over Break The Code.

On 30 August, Invincible Spirit competed in the Ripon Champion Two Years Old Trophy, a Listed race over six furlongs. He started as the 5/6 favourite and was ridden by Mick Kinane. Five furlongs into the race, Invincible Spirit quickened to lead the race and pulled away to win by one and a half lengths from Khasayl, with Femme Fatale a further three and a half lengths back in third place. Invincible Spirit's last race as a two-year-old was the Group 1 Middle Park Stakes. Jockey Richard Quinn held him up, but could not get him to settle early in the race. Invincible Spirit did make some progress in the penultimate furlong, but finished last of the six runners, about four and three quarter lengths behind winner Primo Valentino.

=== 2000: Three-year-old season ===
Invincible Spirit did not race as a three-year-old until 16 September 2000, in the Dubai Duty Free Cup at Newbury. He was ridden for the first time by Pat Eddery, and after being at the rear of the field he could not get a clear run through in the home straight, finishing in fourth place behind winner Warningford. His only other race that year was the Challenge Stakes, where he finished sixth of the nine runners behind winner Last Resort.

=== 2001: Four-year-old season ===
Invincible Spirit started the 2001 season on 4 May, in the Leicestershire Stakes, where he could not reach the leaders and finished fourth behind Warningford. Invincible Spirit then dropped in class for a six-furlong Conditions race at Goodwood. After racing in the middle of the pack, he made progress two furlongs out, before taking the lead as the field entered the final furlong. He went on to win the race by three quarters of a length from Kier Park after being eased up by Pat Eddery in the last 50 yards. Invincible Spirit then went to Royal Ascot for the Cork and Orrery Stakes, where after challenging the leaders over one furlong out, he faded in the final furlong and finished in ninth place. Harmonic Way won the race, beating runner-up Three Points by one length. On 21 July, Invincible Spirit started as the 3/1 favourite for the Hackwood Stakes, where he faced seven opponents. Eddery held him up as usual, before closing on the leaders over two furlongs out and taking the lead with a furlong still to run. After taking the lead he drifted to the right, but kept on to win a one and a half lengths from Mugharreb, with Bouncing Bowdler a further length back in third place.

On 26 August, Invincible Spirit raced outside the United Kingdom for the first time, when he contested the Prix de Meautry. He took second place with 200 metres left to run, but could not catch the leader, Do The Honours, who won easily by three lengths. Hot Tin Roof finished in third place, one and a half lengths behind Invincible Spirit. Invincible Spirit's final race start as a four-year-old came in the MacDonagh Boland Stakes, which took place on 15 September. He raced near the fore of the field in the early stages and was fourth with over one furlong still to run. He took second place inside the final furlong, before just taking the lead on the line to win the race by a short-head from Toroca, with the front two three lengths clear of third placed Anna Elise.

=== 2002: Five-year-old season ===
Invincible Spirit started his five-year-old season by finishing fourth in the Abernant Stakes, a race that was won by Reel Buddy. After being held up, Invincible Spirit could not get a clear run until the final furlong, when he ran on finishing two lengths behind the winner. In the Duke of York Stakes he was ridden for the first and only time by Mick Kinane. After starting as the 3/1 favourite, Kinane positioned him just behind the leaders in the early stages of the race. In a close finish, Invincible Spirit took the lead with about 75 yards left to run and won the race by a neck from Mugharreb, with Lady Dominatrix third and Orientor fourth. On 3 June he raced over the minimum distance of five furlongs for the only time in his career, when he took part in the Temple Stakes at Sandown Park. After tracking the leaders he was left behind when he could not get a clear run over one furlong out, before running on in the final furlong and finishing fifth, about four lengths behind winner Kyllachy.

At Royal Ascot, Invincible Spirit raced in the Golden Jubilee Stakes (the renamed Cork and Orrery Stakes, which had been upgraded to a Group 1 race that year). He started the race at the price of 10/1, with Johannesburg starting as the 3/1 favourite, and Three Points, Danehurst and Continent also near the fore of the betting market. Invincible Spirit was slowly away and jockey Kieren Fallon lost an iron. He was up near the leaders with two furlongs remaining, but faded to finish in sixth place, about five lengths behind the winner. The race was won by Malhub, who beat second-placed Danehurst by one and a half lengths. Invincible Spirit's final race was the Sprint Cup at Haydock Park, where he was ridden by John Carroll. Nayyir was the pre-race favourite at 9/2, with Invincible Spirit starting as a 25/1 outsider. Carroll positioned him near the front of the fourteen-runner field and was challenging for the lead as they entered the final furlong. He stayed on best in the closing stages and took the lead near the finishing line to win the race by a short-head from Malhub. Three Points finished in third place, two lengths behind the winner, and just ahead of Orientor and May Ball, who finished fourth and fifth respectively.

== Stud career ==
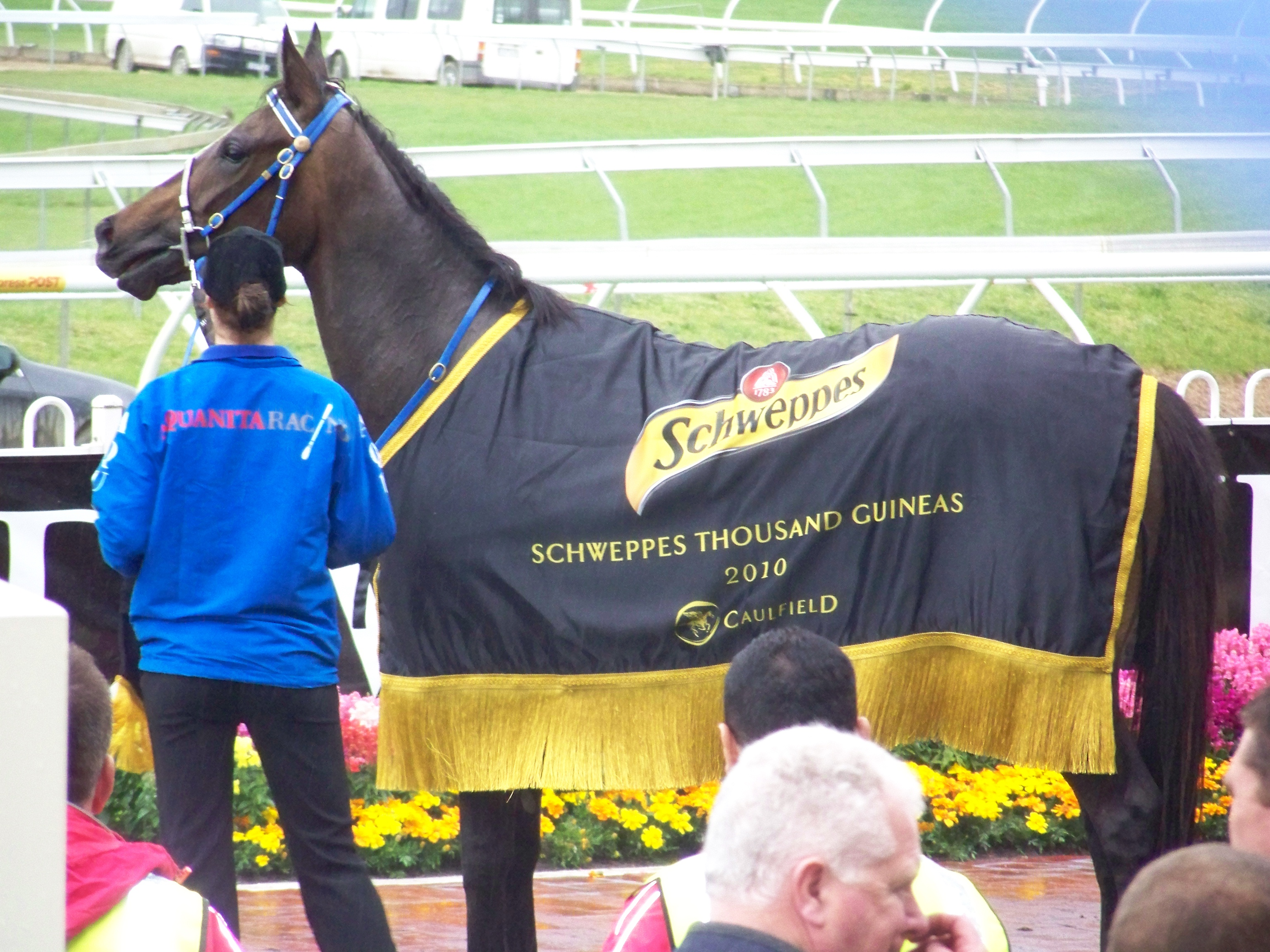
Invincible Spirit's daughter Yosei

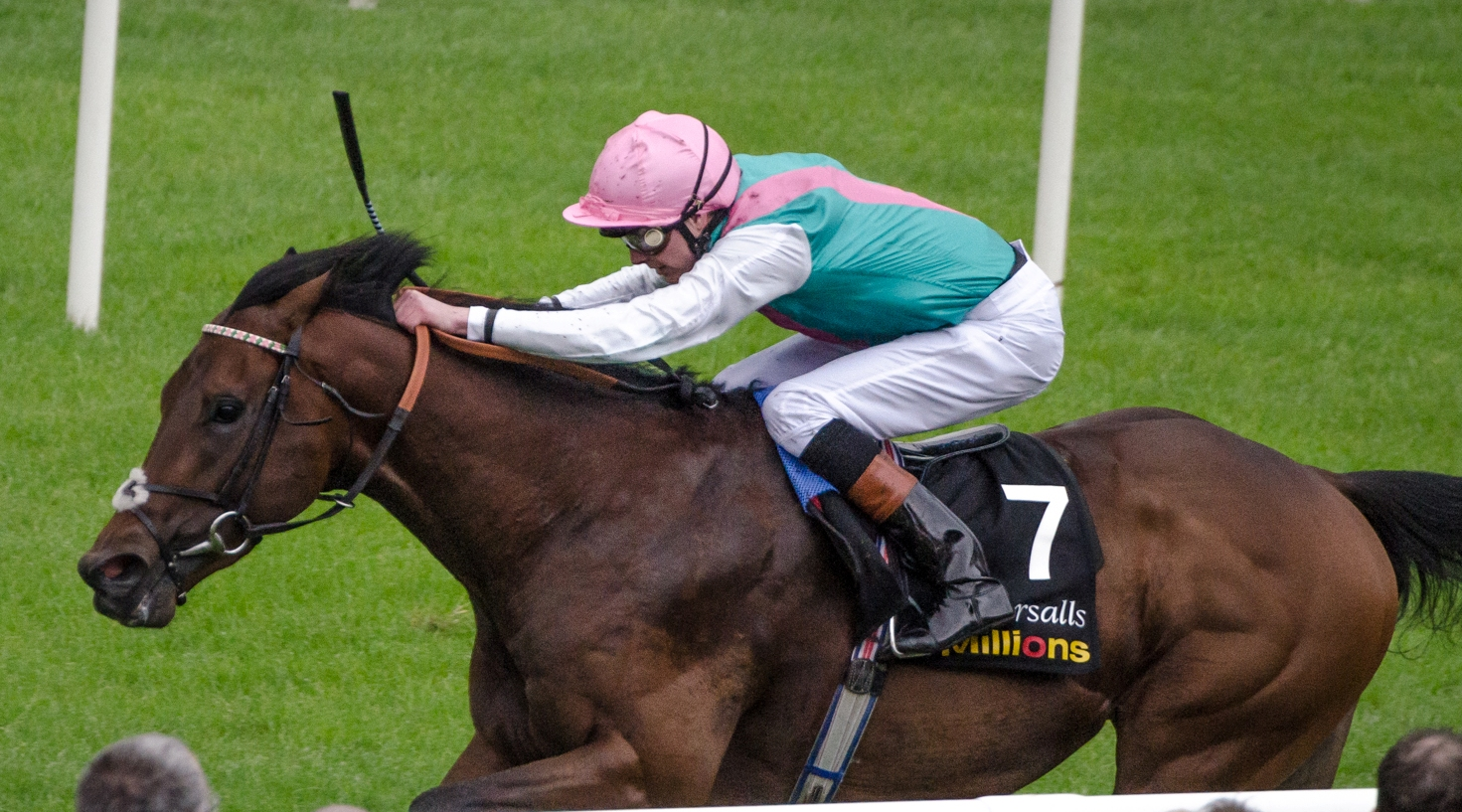
Invincible Spirit's son Kingman

After his retirement from racing, Invincible Spirit joined the stallion roster at the Irish National Stud. His covering fee in his first season in 2003 was €10,000, increasing to €35,000 in 2006 when he earned the freshman sire's title. His fee rose to €100,000 in 2015, following Kingman's victory in the 2014 Irish 2,000 Guineas. Between 2003 and 2007, the stallion shuttled to Australia, where he sired 259 foals, including triple Group 1 winner Yosei and leading sire I Am Invincible.

Invincible Spirit retired from stud in 2024, having sired 22 individual Group 1 winners worldwide. Cathal Beale, chief executive of the Irish National Stud, said: "He has been, unquestionably, the greatest stallion to have ever stood at the Irish National Stud. We're delighted to be able to retire him now on his own terms. He'll live out his days being looked after by the same people, being turned out every day to the same paddock and being given the same exceptional care."

=== Notable progeny ===
Group/Grade 1 winners:

c = colt, f = filly

Foaled	Name	Sex	Major wins
2004	Lawman	c	Prix du Jockey Club, Prix Jean Prat
2005	Fleeting Spirit	f	July Cup
2007	Vale of York	c	Breeders' Cup Juvenile
2007	Yosei	f	Sires' Produce Stakes, The Thousand Guineas, Tattersall's Tiara
2008	Hooray	f	Cheveley Park Stakes
2008	Mayson	c	July Cup
2008	Moonlight Cloud	f	Prix Maurice de Gheest (three times), Prix du Moulin de Longchamp, Prix Jacques Le Marois, Prix de la Forêt
2010	Rosdhu Queen	f	Cheveley Park Stakes
2011	Charm Spirit	c	Prix Jean Prat, Prix du Moulin de Longchamp, Queen Elizabeth II Stakes
2011	Signs of Blessing	c	Prix Maurice de Gheest
2011	Kingman	c	Irish 2,000 Guineas, St James's Palace Stakes, Sussex Stakes, Prix Jacques Le Marois
2012	Profitable	c	King's Stand Stakes
2012	Territories	c	Prix Jean Prat
2013	Shalaa	c	Prix Morny, Middle Park Stakes
2014	National Defense	c	Prix Jean-Luc Lagardère
2015	Eqtidaar	c	Commonwealth Cup
2016	Digital Age	c	Turf Classic Stakes
2016	Magna Grecia	c	Vertem Futurity Trophy, 2000 Guineas
2016	Nazeef	f	Falmouth Stakes, Sun Chariot Stakes
2016	Royal Meeting	c	Critérium International
2017	Danyah	g	Al Quoz Sprint
2017	Pearls Galore	f	Matron Stakes

== Pedigree ==
Pedigree of Invincible Spirit, bay stallion, 1997
Sire Green Desert (USA) b. 1983	Danzig (USA) b. 1977	Northern Dancer b. 1961	Nearctic
Sire Green Desert (USA) b. 1983	Danzig (USA) b. 1977	Northern Dancer b. 1961	Natalma
Sire Green Desert (USA) b. 1983	Danzig (USA) b. 1977	Pas de Nom b. 1968	Admiral's Voyage
Sire Green Desert (USA) b. 1983	Danzig (USA) b. 1977	Pas de Nom b. 1968	Petitioner
Sire Green Desert (USA) b. 1983	Foreign Courier (USA) b. 1979	Sir Ivor b. 1965	Sir Gaylord
Sire Green Desert (USA) b. 1983	Foreign Courier (USA) b. 1979	Sir Ivor b. 1965	Attica
Sire Green Desert (USA) b. 1983	Foreign Courier (USA) b. 1979	Courtly Dee b. 1968	Never Bend
Sire Green Desert (USA) b. 1983	Foreign Courier (USA) b. 1979	Courtly Dee b. 1968	Tulle
Dam Rafha (GB) b. 1987	Kris (GB) ch. 1976	Sharpen Up ch. 1969	Atan
Dam Rafha (GB) b. 1987	Kris (GB) ch. 1976	Sharpen Up ch. 1969	Rocchetta
Dam Rafha (GB) b. 1987	Kris (GB) ch. 1976	Doubly Sure b. 1971	Reliance
Dam Rafha (GB) b. 1987	Kris (GB) ch. 1976	Doubly Sure b. 1971	Soft Angels
Dam Rafha (GB) b. 1987	Eljazzi (USA) b. 1981	Artaius b. 1974	Round Table
Dam Rafha (GB) b. 1987	Eljazzi (USA) b. 1981	Artaius b. 1974	Stylish Pattern
Dam Rafha (GB) b. 1987	Eljazzi (USA) b. 1981	Border Bounty b. 1965	Bounteous
Dam Rafha (GB) b. 1987	Eljazzi (USA) b. 1981	Border Bounty b. 1965	B Flat

Note: b. = Bay, ch. = Chestnut
