= Bengough Stakes =

Flat horse race in Britain

- Class: Group 3
- Location: Ascot Racecourse; Ascot, England
- Inaugurated: 1986
- Race type: Flat / Thoroughbred
- Sponsor: John Guest Racing
- Website: Ascot

Race information
- Distance: 6f (1,207 metres)
- Surface: Turf
- Track: Straight
- Qualification: Three-years-old and up
- Weight: 9 st 3 lb (3yo); 9 st 4 lb (4yo+); Allowances; 3 lb for fillies and mares Penalties; 7 lb for Group 1 winners * 5 lb for Group 2 winners * 3 lb for Group 3 winners * * after 31 March
- Purse: £85,000 (2025); 1st: £48,204

Bengough Stakes
2026
Hidden Force	Prince Of India	Stratusnine

Previous years
2025
Annaf	Apollo One	Tiger Bay
2024
Apollo One	Jarraaf	Russet Gold
2023
Annaf	Commanche Falls	Pink Crystal
2022
Rohaan	Summerghand	Commanche Falls
2021
Vadreamd	King's Lynn	Ventura Diamond

2020-2011
2020
Dakota Gold	The Tin Man	Brando
2019
Cape Byron	Donjuan Triumphant	Keystroke
2018
Projection	Dream Of Dreams	Hey Jonesy
2018
Projection	Dream Of Dreams	Hey Jonesy
2017
Blue Point	Projection	Magical Memory
2016
Shalaa	Mehronissa	Raucous
2015
Eastern Impact	Naadirr	Polybius
2014
Lightning Moon	Danzeno	Louis The Pious
2013
Tropics	Music Master	Hoof It
2012
Mince	Soul	Eton Rifles
2011
Royal Rock	Rose Bonheur	Desert Poppy

2010-2001
2010
Bewitched	Genki	Secret Witness
2009
Royal Rock	Triple Aspect	Brave Prospector
2008
Conquest	Zidane	Sir Gerry
2007
Greek Renaissance	Beckermet	Galeota
2006
Bygone Days	Borderlescott	Tax Free
2005
Welsh Emperor	Baltic King	Moss Vale
2004
Royal Millennium	Moss Vale	Quito
2003
Ashdown Express	Royal Millennium	Colonel Cotton
2002
Needwood Blade	Orientor	Acclamation
2001
Danehurst	Orientor	Bahamian Pirate

2000-1991
2000
Bahamian Pirate	Andreyev	Rushcutter Bay
1999
Gaelic Storm	Pipalong	Delegate
1998
Bold Edge	Tedburrow	Shmoose
1997
My Best Valentine	Bollin Joanne	Snow Kid
1996
Russian Revival	Passion For Life	Easy Option
1995
Royale Figurine	Hello Mister	Indhar
1994
Elrafa Ah	Hard To Figure	Luana
1993
Montendre	Marina Park	Blyton Lad
1992
Hamas	Blyton Lad	Bunty Boo
1991
On Tiptoes	Blyton Lad	Furajet

1990-1988
1990
Ra'A	Dancing Music	Tod
1989
Lugana Beach	Ski Captain	Habitancy
1988
Umbelata	Teeming Shore	Peace Girl

The Bengough Stakes is a Group 3 flat horse race in Great Britain open to horses aged three years or older. It is run at Ascot over a distance of 6 furlongs (1,207 metres), and it is scheduled to take place each year in early October.

== History ==
The event was originally held at Newmarket, where it was called the Bentinck Stakes. It was named after Lord George Bentinck (1802–1848), a successful racehorse owner. It was established in 1986, and was initially a 5-furlong race with Listed status. It was extended to 6 furlongs in 1993, and promoted to Group 3 level in 2003.

The race was transferred to Ascot and renamed the Bengough Memorial Stakes in 2008. Its title was shortened to the Bengough Stakes in 2010. It was formerly staged in mid-October, but it is currently held in the early part of the month.

The Bengough Stakes is named in memory of Sir Piers Bengough (1929–2005), Her Majesty's Representative at Ascot from 1984 to 1997.

== Records ==
Most successful horse (2 wins):

- Royal Rock – 2009, 2011
- Annaf - 2023, 2025

Leading jockey (3 wins):

- Ted Durcan – Royal Millennium (2004), Greek Renaissance (2007), Royal Rock (2011)

Leading trainer (3 wins):

- Saeed bin Suroor – Russian Revival (1996), Bygone Days (2006), Greek Renaissance (2007)
- Chris Wall – Ashdown Express (2003), Royal Rock (2009, 2011)

== Winners ==
Year	Winner	Age	Jockey	Trainer	Time
1986	Gwydion	3	Steve Cauthen	Henry Cecil	1:01.73
1987	Perion	5	Pat Eddery	Geoff Lewis	1:02.96
1988	Umbelata	5	Michael Roberts	Mick Naughton	1:00.90
1989	Lugana Beach	3	Steve Cauthen	David Elsworth	0:59.45
1990	Ra'A	3	Willie Carson	Harry Thomson Jones	1:00.20
1991	On Tiptoes	3	Michael Roberts	Jim Leigh	0:58.64
1992	Hamas	3	Willie Carson	Peter Walwyn	0:58.22
1993	Montendre	6	John Reid	Matt McCormack	1:13.32
1994	Elrafa Ah	3	Richard Hills	Harry Thomson Jones	1:11.80
1995	Royale Figurine	4	John Reid	Martin Fetherston-Godley	1:11.53
1996	Russian Revival	3	Walter Swinburn	Saeed bin Suroor	1:11.38
1997	My Best Valentine	7	Ray Cochrane	Vic Soane	1:14.81
1998	Bold Edge	3	Dane O'Neill	Richard Hannon Sr.	1:11.52
1999	Gaelic Storm	5	Darryll Holland	Mark Johnston	1:13.60
2000	Bahamian Pirate	5	Adrian Nicholls	David Nicholls	1:13.63
2001	Danehurst	3	Seb Sanders	Sir Mark Prescott	1:14.97
2002	Needwood Blade	4	Seb Sanders	Bryan McMahon	1:11.20
2003	Ashdown Express	4	Richard Mullen	Chris Wall	1:13.18
2004	Royal Millennium	6	Ted Durcan	Mick Channon	1:13.71
2005	Welsh Emperor	6	Darryll Holland	Tom Tate	1:13.06
2006	Bygone Days	5	Frankie Dettori	Saeed bin Suroor	1:12.89
2007	Greek Renaissance	4	Ted Durcan	Saeed bin Suroor	1:12.21
2008	Conquest	4	Jimmy Fortune	William Haggas	1:14.74
2009	Royal Rock	5	George Baker	Chris Wall	1:14.99
2010	Bewitched	3	Johnny Murtagh	Charles O'Brien	1:14.85
2011	Royal Rock	7	Ted Durcan	Chris Wall	1:13.51
2012	Mince	3	James Doyle	Roger Charlton	1:14.81
2013	Tropics	5	Robert Winston	Dean Ivory	1:14.55
2014	Lightning Moon	3	George Baker	Ed Walker	1:15.70
2015	Eastern Impact	4	Jack Garrity	Richard Fahey	1:13.34
2016	Shalaa	3	Frankie Dettori	John Gosden	1:14.32
2017	Blue Point	3	William Buick	Charlie Appleby	1:16.24
2018	Projection	5	Kieran Shoemark	Roger Charlton	1:15.46
2019	Cape Byron	5	Andrea Atzeni	Roger Varian	1:15.63
2020 (Note: The 2020 running took place at York after the original Ascot fixture was abandoned due to waterlogging)	Dakota Gold	6	Connor Beasley	Michael Dods	1:14.34
2021	Vadream	3	David Egan	Charlie Fellowes	1:16.20
2022	Rohaan	4	Adam Kirby	David Evans	1:15.35
2023	Annaf	4	Rossa Ryan	Michael Appleby	1:13.83
2024	Apollo One	6	Daniel Tudhope	Peter Charalambous & James Clutterbuck	1:15.39
2025	Annaf	6	Daniel Muscutt	Michael Appleby	1:17.96
2026	Hidden Force	3	Billy Loughnane	Charlie Appleby	1:12.55

== See also ==
- Horse racing in Great Britain
- List of British flat horse races
- Recurring sporting events established in 1986 – this race is included under its original title, Bentinck Stakes.
