= Green Desert (horse) =

American-bred Thoroughbred racehorse

- Sire: Danzig
- Grandsire: Northern Dancer
- Dam: Foreign Courier
- Damsire: Sir Ivor
- Sex: Stallion
- Foaled: April 16, 1983
- Died: September 9, 2015 (aged 32)
- Country: United States
- Colour: Bay
- Breeder: Eaton Farms, Inc & Red Bull Stables
- Owner: Maktoum Al Maktoum
- Trainer: Michael Stoute
- Record: 14: 5-5-0
- Earnings: £222,453

Major wins
- July Stakes (1985); Flying Childers Stakes (1985); European Free Handicap (1986); July Cup (1986); Sprint Cup (1986)

Awards
- Timeform rating 118 (1985), 127 (1986)

Green Desert (16 April 1983 – 9 September 2015) was an American-bred, British-trained Thoroughbred racehorse and sire.

== Racing career ==
=== 1985: two-year-old season ===
After finishing second on his racecourse debut, Green Desert won the July Stakes over six furlongs at Newmarket Racecourse. He then finished second to Nomination in the Richmond Stakes at Goodwood before dropping back to five furlongs to win the Flying Childers Stakes at Doncaster Racecourse. On his final appearance of the season he finished fourth to Luqman in the Mill Reef Stakes at Newbury.

=== 1986: three-year-old season ===
Green Desert began his second season by winning the European Free Handicap over seven furlongs at Newmarket and then finished second to Dancing Brave in the 2000 Guineas. He made no impact on heavy ground in the Irish 2,000 Guineas and then finished second to Sure Blade in the St James's Palace Stakes at Royal Ascot. When brought back to sprint distances Green Desert's form improved as he won the July Cup, finished third to Last Tycoon in the William Hill Sprint Championship and won the Haydock Sprint Cup. In his last two races he finished fourth in the Prix de l'Abbaye and last of nine when tried on dirt in the Breeders' Cup Sprint.

== Stud record ==
Standing at Shadwell Stud, Green Desert was the sire of four Champion Sprinters and seventy-two individual Stakes winners.

Green Desert was retired from stud duty in 2011 and was euthanized at the Nunnery Stud on 9 September 2015 at the age of thirty-two.

=== Major winners ===
c = colt, f = filly, g = gelding

Foaled	Name	Sex	Major wins
1988	Sheikh Albadou	c	Nunthorpe Stakes; Breeders' Cup Sprint; Haydock Sprint Cup
1988	Collier Bay	g	Irish Champion Hurdle; Champion Hurdle
1991	Owington	c	July Cup
1993	Oriental Express	g	Queen Elizabeth II Cup; Hong Kong Champions & Chater Cup
1993	Shinko Forest	c	Takamatsunomiya Kinen
1994	Cape Cross	c	Lockinge Stakes
1995	Desert Prince	c	Irish 2,000 Guineas; Prix du Moulin; Queen Elizabeth II Stakes
1995	Tamarisk	c	Haydock Sprint Cup
1995	White Heart	g	Charles Whittingham Memorial Handicap; Turf Classic Stakes
1996	Bint Allayl	f	Cartier Champion Two-year-old Filly
1997	Invincible Spirit	c	Haydock Sprint Cup
1998	Rose Gypsy	f	Poule d'Essai des Pouliches
1999	Heat Haze	f	Beverly D. Stakes; Matriarch Stakes
2000	Desert Lord	g	Prix de l'Abbaye
2000	Oasis Dream	c	Middle Park Stakes; July Cup; Nunthorpe Stakes
2003	Markab	g	Haydock Sprint Cup

=== Sire of sires ===
Several of Green Desert's sons became successful breeding stallions and three had exceptional success:

- Cape Cross sired Ouija Board, Sea The Stars, Golden Horn, Behkabad, Able One, Seachange and Awtaad.
- Invincible Spirit sired Kingman, Moonlight Cloud, Charm Spirit, Magna Grecia, Fleeting Spirit, Eqtidaar, Mayson, Lawman, Nazeef, Vale of York, Hooray, Shalaa and Rosdhu Queen.
- Oasis Dream sired Midday, Muhaarar, Goldream, Power, Aqlaam, Jwala, Charming Thought, Arcano, Prohibit and Pretty Pollyanna.

== Pedigree ==
Pedigree of Green Desert, bay stallion, 1983
Sire Danzig	Northern Dancer	Nearctic	Nearco
Sire Danzig	Northern Dancer	Nearctic	Lady Angela
Sire Danzig	Northern Dancer	Natalma	Native Dancer
Sire Danzig	Northern Dancer	Natalma	Almahmoud
Sire Danzig	Pas de Nom	Admiral's Voyage	Crafty Admiral
Sire Danzig	Pas de Nom	Admiral's Voyage	Olympia Lou
Sire Danzig	Pas de Nom	Petitioner	Petition
Sire Danzig	Pas de Nom	Petitioner	Steady Aim
Dam Foreign Courier	Sir Ivor	Sir Gaylord	Turn-to
Dam Foreign Courier	Sir Ivor	Sir Gaylord	Somethingroyal
Dam Foreign Courier	Sir Ivor	Attica	Mr. Trouble
Dam Foreign Courier	Sir Ivor	Attica	Athenia
Dam Foreign Courier	Courtly Dee	Never Bend	Nasrullah
Dam Foreign Courier	Courtly Dee	Never Bend	Lalun
Dam Foreign Courier	Courtly Dee	Tulle	War Admiral
Dam Foreign Courier	Courtly Dee	Tulle	Judy-Rae (family: A4)
