= Vale of York (horse) =

Irish-bred Thoroughbred racehorse

- Sire: Invincible Spirit
- Grandsire: Green Desert
- Dam: Red Vale
- Damsire: Halling
- Sex: Colt
- Foaled: 2007
- Country: Ireland
- Colour: Bay
- Breeder: Stock Vale Ltd.
- Owner: Godolphin Racing
- Trainer: Saeed bin Suroor
- Record: 6: 3-1-1
- Earnings: $1,217,160

Major wins
- Stardom Stakes (2009); Breeders' Cup Juvenile (2009)

Vale of York (foaled 4 April 2007 in Ireland is a Thoroughbred racehorse best known for winning the 2009 Breeders' Cup Juvenile. Bred by Stock Vale Ltd., Vale of York's sire, Invincible Spirit, was a sprinter, securing all seven of his victories over 6 furlongs, including the Group 1 Haydock Sprint Cup in 2001 at Haydock Park Racecourse.

Vale of York's dam, Red Vale, did not race, but she is a half-sister to Uraib, who stayed 1 mile, 1 furlong well in Graded company in California. She has produced two foals to race to date.

By the end of 2009, Vale of York had won three of his six starts. His last, on 7 November 2009, came in the Breeders' Cup Juvenile run on Polytrack synthetic dirt at Santa Anita Park in Arcadia, California, winning by a head over 2-1 favorite Lookin at Lucky.

Vale of York's three-year-old season began with a fifth-place finish in the Al Bastayika at the new Meydan Racecourse in Dubai.
