= St Hugh's Stakes =

Flat horse race in Britain

- Class: Listed
- Location: Newbury Racecourse; Newbury, England
- Race type: Flat / Thoroughbred
- Sponsor: Sequoia
- Website: www.newbury-racecourse.co.uk

Race information
- Distance: 5f 34y (1,037 metres)
- Surface: Turf
- Track: Straight
- Qualification: Two-year-old fillies
- Weight: 9 st 2 lb Penalties; 3 lb for Listed winners 5 lb for Group winners
- Purse: £46,000 (2025); 1st: £25,520

St Hugh's Stakes
2026
Angels Lane	Fast Track	Wateera

Previous years
2025
Hollywood Treasure	Palmeira	Flowerhead
2024
Englemere	Kaadi	Kuwaitya
2023
Miaharris	Majestic Beauty	Tears Of A Clown
2022
Cuban Mistress	Union Court	Woolhampton
2021
Tardis	Attagirl	Delmona

2020-2011
2020
Zoetic	Fairy Dust	Caroline Dale
2019
Orlaith	Al Raya	Dr Simpson
2018
Shumookhi	Heartwarming	Come On Leicester
2017
Eirene	Sankari Royale	Mrs Gallagher
2016
Mrs Danvers	Equimou	Stormy Clouds
2015
Whatdoiwantthatfor	Thatsallimsaying	Pity Cash
2014
Bronze Maquette	Al Fareej	Parsley
2013
Wind Fire	Excel's Beauty	Lilbourne Lass
2012
Rosdhu Queen	Sound Of Guns	Sandreamer
2011
Kohala	Excelette	Mary Fildes

2010-2001
2010
Electric Waves	Sweet Cecily	The Thrill Is Gone
2009
Sand Vixen	Shamandar	Above Limits
2008
Madame Trop Vite	Kerrys Requiem	Riotista
2007
Cake	Cute Ass	Perfect Paula
2006
Abby Road	Vale of Belvoir	Alzerra
2005
Strut	Sweet Afton	Brenda Meova
2004
Sumora	Castelletto	Right Answer
2003
Needles And Pins	Nyramba	Dolce Piccata
2002
Speed Cop	Wimple	Topkamp
2001
Swiss Lake	Pastel	Mizillablack

2000-1991
2000
Strange Destiny	Silla	Kachina Doll
1999
Elaflaak	Kalindi	See You Later
1998
Amazing Dream	Crystal Charm	Riberac
1997
Aurigny	Banningham Blade	Socket Set
1996
Head Over Heels	Olympic Spirit	Queen Sceptre
1995
Amazing Bay	Maggi For Margaret	Hear The Music
1994
Easy Option	Quiz Time	Limerick Belle
1993
Petula	Stimulant	Tricorne
1992
Palacegate Episode	Hamsah	Risk Me's Girl
1991
Mamma's Too	Harvest Girl	Miss Nosey Parker

1990-1988
1990
Dominio	Almasa	Sharpthorne
1989
Polar Bird	Petillante	Tadwin
1988
Bocas Rose	Snake Song	Desert Dawn

The St Hugh's Stakes is a Listed flat horse race in Great Britain open to two-year-old fillies. It is run at Newbury over a distance of 5 furlongs and 34 yards (1,037 metres), and it is scheduled to take place each year in August.

The race was awarded Listed status in 2003.

== Records ==
Leading jockeys

(5 wins):

- Lester Piggott - Eblouissante (1960), Keep Going (1968), Street Light (1973), Amaranda (1977), Be My Valentine (1983)

(4 wins):

- Oisin Murphy - Shumookhi (2018), Zoetic (2020), Tardis (2021), Miaharris (2023)

Leading trainer (5 wins):

- Harry Wragg - Rainbow Tie (1956), Joey (1971), Amaranda (1977), On The House (1981), Favoridge (1982)

== Winners ==
Year	Winner	Jockey	Trainer	Time
1949	Game Book	Gordon Richards	Vic Smyth	1:02.40
1950	Chinese Cracker	Gordon Richards	Herbert Blagrave	1:04.00
1951	Cow Girl	Doug Smith	Fred Templeman	1:03.20
1952	Sky Blue	Frankie Durr	William Smyth	1:02.00
1953	Welsh Fairy	Frankie Durr	Peter Hastings-Bass	1:01.60
1954	Miss Mink	Eph Smith	John Waugh	1:03.40
1955	Claudine	Bill Elliott	Ken Cundell	1:00.60
1956	Rainbow Tie	Manny Mercer	Harry Wragg	1:03.20
1957	Meissa	Lester Piggott	Arthur Budgett	1:04.20
1958	Short Sentence	Lester Piggott	Noel Murless	1:03.40
1959	Be Cautious	Duncan Keith	Don Butchers	1:05.60
1960	Eblouissante	Lester Piggott	Noel Murless	1:05.00
1961	Victorina	Wally Swinburn	Peter Nelson	1:04.20
1962	My Goodness Me	Doug Smith	Geoffrey Brooke	1:03.80
1963	Royal Justice	Ron Hutchinson	Jack Jarvis	1:06.40
1964	Runnello	Ron Hutchinson	Jack Jarvis	1:01.60
1965	Procession	Joe Mercer	John Waugh	1:02.60
1966	Floosie	Taffy Thomas	Geoffrey Barling	1:05.40
1967	Aunt Audrey	Wally Swinburn	Peter Payne-Gallwey	1:05.20
1968	Keep Going	Lester Piggott	Ted Leader	1:05.60
1969	Red Velvet	Duncan Keith	Peter Walwyn	1:04.40
1970	Magic Flute	Sandy Barclay	Noel Murless	1:03.94
1971	Joey	Brian Taylor	Harry Wragg	1:04.67
1972	Holy Palm	Willie Carson	Eddie Reavey	1:04.15
1973	Street Light	Lester Piggott	Jeremy Hindley	1:04.43
1974	Honey Pot	Pat Eddery	Peter Walwyn	1:06.79
1975	Alacriter	Joe Mercer	Peter Nelson	1:04.27
1976	Haraka	Buster Parnell	Eddie Harty	1:02.42
1977	Amaranda	Lester Piggott	Harry Wragg	1:02.03
1978	Innini	Brian Taylor	Ryan Price	1:03.86
1979	Blue Persian	Bruce Raymond	Ben Hanbury	1:06.15
1980	Abandoned due to waterlogging
1981	On The House	Greville Starkey	Harry Wragg	1:02.34
1982	Favoridge	Steve Cauthen	Harry Wragg	1:04.20
1983	Be My Valentine	Lester Piggott	Henry Cecil	1:01.94
1984	Glory Of Hera	Geoff Baxter	Clive Brittain	1:02.77
1985	Nashia	Joe Mercer	Peter Walwyn	1:04.09
1986	Abuzz	Michael Roberts	Clive Brittain	1:02.85
1987	Pea Green	Philip Waldron	Reg Akehurst	1:02.81
1988	Bocas Rose	Brian Rouse	Richard Hannon Sr.	1:04.28
1989	Polar Bird	Michael Hills	Barry Hills	1:02.66
1990	Dominio	Ray Cochrane	Peter Walwyn	1:03.27
1991	Mamma's Too	Richard Quinn	Jack Berry	1:03.20
1992	Palacegate Episode	Gary Carter	Jack Berry	1:03.28
1993	Petula	Michael Hills	Michael Bell	1:00.61
1994	Easy Option	Richard Quinn	William Jarvis	1:01.40
1995	Amazing Bay	Willie Ryan	Ian Balding	1:02.76
1996	Head Over Heels	Frankie Dettori	John Gosden	1:02.07
1997	Aurigny	Seb Sanders	Simon Dow	1:01.72
1998	Amazing Dream	Dane O'Neill	Richard Hannon Sr.	1:03.14
1999	Elaflaak	Richard Hills	Marcus Tregoning	1:01.82
2000	Strange Destiny	John Reid	Alan Berry	1:01.42
2001	Swiss Lake	Kevin Darley	Gerard Butler	1:01.60
2002	Speed Cop	Martin Dwyer	Ian Balding	1:00.81
2003	Needles And Pins	Kieren Fallon	Michael Bell	1:00.88
2004	Sumora	Jimmy Fortune	Gerard Butler	1:01.30
2005	Strut	Steve Drowne	Roger Charlton	1:01.84
2006	Abby Road	Frankie Dettori	Brian Meehan	1:02.13
2007	Cake	Pat Dobbs	Richard Hannon Sr.	1:02.32
2008	Madame Trop Vite	Neil Callan	Kevin Ryan	1:03.70
2009	Sand Vixen	Frankie Dettori	Saeed bin Suroor	1:01.62
2010	Electric Waves	Richard Mullen	Ed McMahon	1:03.02
2011	Kohala	Jimmy Fortune	David Barron	1:01.09
2012	Rosdhu Queen	Ryan Moore	William Haggas	1:01.20
2013	Wind Fire	Ryan Moore	David Brown	1:01.67
2014	Bronze Maquette	Shane Kelly	Gary Moore	1:02.76
2015	Whatdoiwantthatfor	Pat Dobbs	Richard Hannon Jr.	1:04.63
2016	Mrs Danvers	Richard Kingscote	Jonathan Portman	1:01.30
2017	Eirene	Robert Winston	Dean Ivory	1:03.31
2018	Shumookhi	Oisin Murphy	Archie Watson	1:02.03
2019	Orlaith	Paul Mulrennan	Iain Jardine	1:02.69
2020	Zoetic	Oisin Murphy	James Ferguson	1:02.00
2021	Tardis	Oisin Murphy	Michael Bell	1:01.62
2022	Cuban Mistress	Ross Coakley	Rod Millman	1:00.24
2023	Miaharris	Oisin Murphy	Owen Burrows	1:01.59
2024	Englemere	Billy Loughnane	George Boughey	1:00.32
2025	Hollywood Treasure	Rowan Scott	Kevin Philippart De Foy	1:00.62
2026	Angels Lane	Nicola Currie	Henry Candy	1:00.16

== See also ==
- Horse racing in Great Britain
- List of British flat horse races
