= Mayson (horse) =

British-bred Thoroughbred racehorse

- Racing silks of David Armstrong
- Sire: Invincible Spirit
- Grandsire: Green Desert
- Dam: Mayleaf
- Damsire: Pivotal
- Sex: Stallion
- Foaled: 16 May 2008
- Country: Great Britain
- Colour: Bay
- Breeder: Highfield Farm
- Owner: David Armstrong; Cheveley Park Stud
- Trainer: Richard Fahey
- Record: 18: 5-4-3
- Earnings: £417,649

Major wins
- Abernant Stakes (2012); Palace House Stakes (2012); July Cup (2012)

Mayson (foaled 16 May 2008) is a British Thoroughbred racehorse who won the July Cup by five lengths in 2012. He is owned by David Armstrong and Cheveley Park Stud and trained by Richard Fahey.

== Breeding ==
Mayson, a bay horse with a white snip was foaled on 16 May 2008 and is a son of Haydock Sprint Cup winner Invincible Spirit. Invincible Spirit has produced a number of top sprinters, including July Cup winner Fleeting Spirit and multiple Group 1 winner Moonlight Cloud, but has also sired some top middle-distance horses such as Prix du Jockey Club winner Lawman. Mayson was bred at David Armstrong's Highfield Farm stud near Coppull in Lancashire and is the first foal of his dam, Mayleaf, a daughter of Nunthorpe Stakes winner Pivotal.

== Racing career ==
=== 2010: Two-year-old season ===
Mayson's first race came in a five furlong maiden at York in June 2010, where he finished second of the ten runners. He then won a five furlong maiden race at Hamilton Park. He started at 11/2 for the Molecomb Stakes at Glorious Goodwood. Ridden by Paul Hanagan for the third time, he finished in fourth place, about two and a half lengths behind winner Zebedee. Mayson stepped up in trip to win a six furlong race at Ripon. He followed this up by finishing second in the Listed Champion Two Yrs Old Trophy, also run over six furlongs at Ripon. His final start of the 2010 season came in the Mill Reef Stakes at Newbury. Ridden by Neil Callan for the first time, he started at 28/1 and finished in sixth of the seven runners, over five lengths behind winner Temple Meads.

=== 2011: Three-year-old season ===
Mayson started his three-year-old career in the Great St. Wilfrid Stakes. Starting as a 40/1 outsider he finished in third place, four and a quarter lengths behind winner Pepper Lane. He then finished near the rear of the field in the Ayr Gold Cup, before finishing in third in the Listed Rous Stakes at Ascot. He then finished fourth in the Mercury Stakes at Dundalk and was the runner-up in the Wentworth Stakes at Doncaster on his final start of 2011.

=== 2012: Four-year-old season ===
Mayson finished third in the six furlong Cammidge Trophy at Doncaster on his re-appearance as a four-year-old. He gained his first Listed success when winning the Abernant Stakes. Ridden by Paul Hanagan he started at 4/1 and was ridden near the front of the 10-runner field. As they entered the final furlong he took the lead and ran on to win by three and a half lengths from the gelding Jimmy Styles, gaining his first victory for twenty months. He followed this up with his first Group win in the Palace House Stakes two weeks later. He started as the 7/2 favourite and was in the middle of the pack early on in the race. As he had done in the Abernant Stakes, he took the lead entering the final furlong and went on to win by three quarters of length from Definightly, who just beat Elusivity for second place. He finished in last place, tailed off behind winner Tiddliwinks, in the Duke of York Stakes. He then finished in fifth place in the Chipchase Stakes after being hampered with over a furlong left to run.

After these two disappointing runs he started at 20/1 for the July Cup, which was run on heavy ground. The field included Al Quoz Sprint winner Ortensia and Golden Jubilee Stakes winner Society Rock. Mayson led the race after about a furlong and was shaken up by Paul Hanagan as they approached the final furlong. He pulled clear to win by five lengths from The Cheka, with Society Rock a further length back in third. The victory was Paul Hanagan's first Group 1 win. After the July Cup Cheveley Park Stud bought a majority share in Mayson.

Mayson travelled to France for the Prix de l'Abbaye de Longchamp, with the ground being heavy again he started as the 3/1 favourite. He was in the middle field in the early stages, but had made progress through the pack with 400 metres left to run. He took the lead 300 metres out and edged away from Hamish McGonagall in the final 200 metres, but Wizz Kid overtook them both in the final few metres of the race and won by a neck from Mayson, with Hamish McGonagall half a length down in third.

== Retirement ==
Mayson was being trained for the British Champions Sprint Stakes on 20 October, but after suffering a bruised foot in the Prix de l'Abbaye he failed to recover in time and was retired to stud. After Mayson's retirement trainer Richard Fahey said: "He's been a great horse for us. There won't be many horses that have won an Abernant, a Palace House and a July Cup all in the same year." Mayson earned a total of £417,649 during his racing career.

== Stud record ==
Mayson stands as a stallion at Cheveley Park Stud for a service fee in 2020 of £5,000.

=== Notable progeny ===
c = colt, f = filly

Foaled	Name	Sex	Major wins
2016	Oxted	c	July Cup, King's Stand Stakes

== Honours ==
In November 2012, Mayson was very narrowly beaten by the Australian mare Black Caviar for the title of European Champion Sprinter at the Cartier Racing Awards.

== Pedigree ==
Pedigree of Mayson, bay colt, 2008
Sire Invincible Spirit (IRE) b. 1997	Green Desert (USA) b. 1983	Danzig b. 1977	Northern Dancer
Sire Invincible Spirit (IRE) b. 1997	Green Desert (USA) b. 1983	Danzig b. 1977	Pas de Nom
Sire Invincible Spirit (IRE) b. 1997	Green Desert (USA) b. 1983	Foreign Courier b. 1979	Sir Ivor
Sire Invincible Spirit (IRE) b. 1997	Green Desert (USA) b. 1983	Foreign Courier b. 1979	Courtly Dee
Sire Invincible Spirit (IRE) b. 1997	Rafha (GB) b. 1987	Kris ch. 1976	Sharpen Up
Sire Invincible Spirit (IRE) b. 1997	Rafha (GB) b. 1987	Kris ch. 1976	Doubly Sure
Sire Invincible Spirit (IRE) b. 1997	Rafha (GB) b. 1987	Eljazzi b. 1981	Artaius
Sire Invincible Spirit (IRE) b. 1997	Rafha (GB) b. 1987	Eljazzi b. 1981	Border Bounty
Dam Mayleaf (GB) ch. 2003	Pivotal (GB) ch. 1993	Polar Falcon b. 1987	Nureyev
Dam Mayleaf (GB) ch. 2003	Pivotal (GB) ch. 1993	Polar Falcon b. 1987	Marie d'Argonne
Dam Mayleaf (GB) ch. 2003	Pivotal (GB) ch. 1993	Fearless Revival ch. 1987	Cozzene
Dam Mayleaf (GB) ch. 2003	Pivotal (GB) ch. 1993	Fearless Revival ch. 1987	Stufida
Dam Mayleaf (GB) ch. 2003	Bayleaf (GB) ch. 1995	Efisio b. 1982	Formidable
Dam Mayleaf (GB) ch. 2003	Bayleaf (GB) ch. 1995	Efisio b. 1982	Eldoret
Dam Mayleaf (GB) ch. 2003	Bayleaf (GB) ch. 1995	Bayonne ch. 1988	Bay Express
Dam Mayleaf (GB) ch. 2003	Bayleaf (GB) ch. 1995	Bayonne ch. 1988	Lambay

Note: b. = Bay, ch. = Chestnut
