= Rafha (horse) =

British-bred Thoroughbred racehorse

- Sire: Kris
- Grandsire: Sharpen Up
- Dam: Eljazzi
- Damsire: Artaius
- Sex: Mare
- Foaled: 19 February 1987
- Country: United Kingdom
- Colour: Bay
- Breeder: Nawara Stud Co Ltd
- Owner: A A Faisal
- Trainer: Henry Cecil
- Record: 7: 5-2-0
- Earnings: £196,031

Major wins
- May Hill Stakes (1989); Princess Elizabeth Stakes (1990); Lingfield Oaks Trial (1990); Prix de Diane (1990)

Rafha (19 February 1987 – 2010) was a British Thoroughbred racehorse and broodmare. As a two-year-old in 1989 she won two of her four races including the May Hill Stakes. In the following year she was undefeated in three starts, taking the Princess Elizabeth Stakes and the Lingfield Oaks Trial before recording her biggest victory in the Prix de Diane. After her retirement from racing she became a prolific and successful broodmare whose foals include Invincible Spirit, who later emerged as one of Ireland's prominent stallions.

== Background ==
Rafha was a "tiny" bay mare bred in the United Kingdom by her owner, A A Faisal's Nawara Stud. She was sent into training with Henry Cecil at his Warren Place stable in Newmarket, Suffolk. She was ridden in all but two of her races by Steve Cauthen.

She was sired by Kris, an outstanding miler who won fourteen of his sixteen races between 1978 and 1980. Kris's other progeny included Oh So Sharp, Unite, Balisada, Shavian and Shamshir. Rafha's dam Eljazzi won one minor race from four starts in Britain in 1983 and 1984. She was a granddaughter of B Flat (foaled 1958) whose other descendants included Bachir, Pitcairn and Assessor. Eljazzi had been bought for Faisal by the bloodstock agent Johnnie Lewis who had previously had great success as a bobsleigh racer.

== Racing career ==
=== 1989: two-year-old season ===
Rafha's first contest, a maiden race over six furlongs at Goodwood Racecourse on 2 June was barely a race at all as she started at odds of 1/14 and won easily by two and a half lengths from her only opponent. Willie Ryan took the ride a month later when the filly ran in a minor event at Newmarket Racecourse and finished second, beaten half a length by the Luca Cumani-trained Agri Dagri. On her next start, over seven furlongs at Epsom Racecourse on 28 August she led for most of the way before being overtaken in the final strides and being beaten a neck by Ruby Tiger, to whom she was conceding ten pounds in weight. On 13 September Rafha was stepped up in class and distance for the Group 3 May Hill Stakes over one mile at Doncaster Racecourse and started the 11/8 favourite against four opponents. After being restrained at the rear of the field she made steady progress in the straight, overtook the front-running Knight's Baroness a furlong from the finish and won by a length.

=== 1990: three-year-old season ===
Rafha made her first appearance as a three-year-old in the Listed Princess Elizabeth Stakes over 8 1/2 furlongs at Epsom on 24 April. Starting the even-money favourite in an eight-runner field, she took the lead a furlong out and accelerated away from her rivals to win by ten lengths from the Ian Balding-trained Spurned. On 12 May the filly started 8/13 favourite for the Listed Oaks Trial over 11 1/2 furlongs at Lingfield Park and won by a neck from Knights Baroness after taking the lead approaching the final furlong.

On 10 June Rafha was sent to France to contest the Prix de Diane over 2000 metres at Chantilly Racecourse in which she was partnered by the 47-year-old veteran Willie Carson. Her thirteen rivals included Houseproud (Poule d'Essai des Pouliches), Atoll (Oaks d'Italia), Air de Rien (Prix Saint-Alary) and Moon Cactus (Prestige Stakes). After pulling hard in the early stages Rafha turned into the straight in sixth place and then accelerated through the field to take the lead 200 metres from the finish. She kept on strongly in the closing stages and won by half a length from Colour Chart with Moon Cactus a further half a length back in third place. After an inquiry by the racecourse stewards Colour Chart was disqualified for hampering the fourth-placed finisher Air de Rien.

== Breeding record ==
At the end of her racing career, Rafha was retired to become a broodmare for the Nawara Stud. She produced at least fourteen foals and eleven winners between 1992 and 2009:

- Al Widyan, a bay colt, foaled in 1992, sired by Slip Anchor. Won three races.
- Sadian, bay colt, 1995, by Shirley Heights. Won six races including the John Porter Stakes and Ormonde Stakes.
- Fnan, bay colt (later gelded), 1996, by Generous. Won four flat races, seven National Hunt races and five Point-to-point races.
- Invincible Spirit, brown colt, 1997, by Green Desert Won seven races including the Haydock Sprint Cup. Sire of Kingman, Shalaa, Fleeting Spirit, Mayson, Hooray and Rosdhu Queen.
- Aquarius, bay colt (gelded), 1998, by Royal Academy. Won two races.
- Massarra, bay filly, 1999, by Danehill. Won three races including the Empress Stakes. Dam of several winners including Gustav Klimt (Superlative Stakes).
- Voyager, bay colt (gelded), 2000, by Green Desert. Failed to win in four races.
- Kodiac, bay colt, 2001, by Danehill. Won four races. Sire of Tiggy Wiggy.
- Acts of Grace, bay filly, 2003, by Bahri. Won four races including the Princess Royal Stakes.
- Jafaru, bay colt (gelded), 2004, by Silver Hawk. Won three races.
- By Command, bay colt (gelded), 2005, by Red Ransom. Won three races.
- Gyr, chestnut colt, 2006, by Pivotal. Won one race.
- Valeur, bay filly, 2007, by Rock of Gibraltar. Failed to win in two races.
- Affectionately, chestnut filly, 2009, by Galileo. Unraced.

== Pedigree ==
Pedigree of Rafha (GB), bay mare, 1987
Sire Kris (GB) 1976	Sharpen Up (GB); 1969	Atan (USA)	Native Dancer
Sire Kris (GB) 1976	Sharpen Up (GB); 1969	Atan (USA)	Mixed Marriage (GB)
Sire Kris (GB) 1976	Sharpen Up (GB); 1969	Rocchetta	Rockfella
Sire Kris (GB) 1976	Sharpen Up (GB); 1969	Rocchetta	Chambiges (FR)
Sire Kris (GB) 1976	Doubly Sure (GB); 1971	Reliance (FR)	Tantieme
Sire Kris (GB) 1976	Doubly Sure (GB); 1971	Reliance (FR)	Relance
Sire Kris (GB) 1976	Doubly Sure (GB); 1971	Soft Angels	Crepello
Sire Kris (GB) 1976	Doubly Sure (GB); 1971	Soft Angels	Sweet Angel
Dam Eljazzi (IRE) 1981	Artaius (USA); 1974	Round Table	Princequillo (IRE)
Dam Eljazzi (IRE) 1981	Artaius (USA); 1974	Round Table	Knights Daughter (GB)
Dam Eljazzi (IRE) 1981	Artaius (USA); 1974	Stylish Pattern	My Babu (FR)
Dam Eljazzi (IRE) 1981	Artaius (USA); 1974	Stylish Pattern	Sunset Gun (GB)
Dam Eljazzi (IRE) 1981	Border Bounty (GB); 1965	Bounteous	Rockefella
Dam Eljazzi (IRE) 1981	Border Bounty (GB); 1965	Bounteous	Marie Elizabeth
Dam Eljazzi (IRE) 1981	Border Bounty (GB); 1965	B Flat	Chanteur (FR)
Dam Eljazzi (IRE) 1981	Border Bounty (GB); 1965	B Flat	Ardeen (Family: 7-a)
