= Moonlight Cloud =

Racehorse

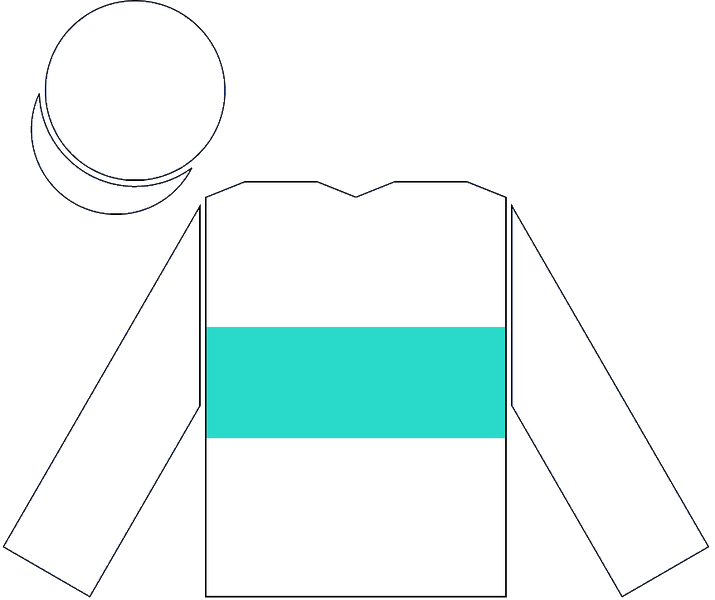
- Racing silks of George Strawbridge
- Sire: Invincible Spirit
- Grandsire: Green Desert
- Dam: Ventura
- Damsire: Spectrum
- Sex: Mare
- Foaled: 5 March 2008
- Country: Great Britain
- Colour: Bay
- Breeder: George Strawbridge
- Owner: George Strawbridge
- Trainer: Freddy Head
- Record: 18: 11-2-0
- Earnings: £1,232,525

Major wins
- Prix Imprudence (2011); Prix de la Porte Maillot (2011, 2013); Prix Maurice de Gheest (2011, 2012, 2013); Prix du Palais-Royal (2012); Prix du Moulin (2012); Prix Jacques Le Marois (2013); Prix de la Forêt (2013)

Awards
- Cartier Champion Older Horse (2013)

Moonlight Cloud (foaled 5 March 2008) is a British–bred, French-trained Thoroughbred racehorse who has won the Prix Maurice de Gheest three times and the Prix du Moulin de Longchamp. In a famous race for the Diamond Jubilee Stakes in 2012, she was beaten a head by the Australian champion Black Caviar in a photo-finish. She is owned by George Strawbridge and trained by Freddy Head.

== Breeding ==
Moonlight Cloud was foaled on 5 March 2008 and is a daughter of Haydock Sprint Cup winner Invincible Spirit. Invincible Spirit has produced a number of top sprinters, including July Cup winners Mayson and Fleeting Spirit, but has also sired some top middle-distance horses such as Prix du Jockey Club winner Lawman. Moonlight Cloud's dam, Ventura, was a race winner and a daughter of Irish 2,000 Guineas and Champion Stakes winner Spectrum.

== Racing career ==
=== 2010: two-year-old season ===
Moonlight Cloud made her first racecourse appearance in a maiden race at Deauville, which she won easily. She followed this up by easily winning a conditions race at Longchamp. She then started as the 11/4 favourite for the Prix Jean-Luc Lagardère. In the race she finished in fourth place, 3½ lengths behind the unbeaten Wootton Bassett.

=== 2011: three-year-old season ===
In her first race as a three-year-old Moonlight Cloud beat the favourite, Helleborine, by two lengths to win the Prix Imprudence at Maisons-Laffitte. She then travelled across the English Channel for the 1000 Guineas at Newmarket. Racing over a mile for the first time, jockey Davy Bonilla held her up near the rear of the 18 runner field. She improved her position with three furlongs left to run and let two furlongs out, but she weakened in the final furlong and finished in seventh place. Blue Bunting won the race by three quarters of a length from Together. Head later claimed that the filly's chances had been compromised by the actions of the stalls-handlers, who had loaded her into the stalls too soon. Moonlight Cloud then returned to France for the Prix du Palais-Royal. She started as the odds-on favourite, but finished in second place, beaten by 1½ lengths by Sahpresa. She then gained a narrow victory over African Story in the Prix de la Porte Maillot. Moving back up in class to Group 1, she started at 9/1 for the Prix Maurice de Gheest. The field of 13 included July Cup winner Dream Ahead, Phoenix Stakes winner Zoffany, Golden Jubilee Stakes winner Society Rock and three time Prix Maurice de Gheest winner Marchand d'Or. During the early stages of the race jockey Thierry Jarnet held Moonlight Cloud up near the rear of the field. She took the lead with a furlong left to run and went clear to win by four lengths from Society Rock, who just beat Marchand D'Or and Genki for second place. In her final race of the season she finished fifth behind Deacon Blues in the British Champions Sprint Stakes at Ascot.

=== 2012: four-year-old season ===
Moonlight Cloud started her four-year-old season by winning the Prix du Palais-Royal by two lengths from So Long Malpic. She then went to Royal Ascot for the Diamond Jubilee Stakes where her opposition included the unbeaten 1/6 favourite Black Caviar and the previous year's winner Society Rock. Near the finish she was closing fast on the then injured leader Black Caviar, but Black Caviar just held on to win by a head from Moonlight Cloud, with Restiadargent a further neck behind in third place. Moonlight Cloud started as the odds-on favourite for the Prix Maurice de Gheest and won easily by five lengths from Wizz Kid. Racing over a mile for the first time since the 1000 Guineas she then finished fourth in the Prix Jacques Le Marois, about 1¾ lengths behind winner Excelebration. She then faced just three rivals in the Prix du Moulin de Longchamp and started as the 10/11 favourite. Multiple Group 1 runner-up Farhh started at 11/8, with Sarkiyla at 12/1 and Caspar Netscher at 14/1. She challenged for the lead with about two furlongs left to run and took the lead one furlong out. Farhh slowly closed in the last 100 yards, but Moonlight Cloud just held him off to win by a head. On her final appearance of the year, Moonlight Cloud was sent to California to contest the Breeders' Cup Mile at Santa Anita Park. She started third favourite but was never in contention and finished eighth of the nine runners behind Wise Dan.

=== 2013: five-year-old season ===
Moonlight Cloud did not appear as a five-year-old until July, when she contested the Prix de la Porte Maillot at Longchamp. Starting the 9/10 favourite she took the lead inside the last 200 metres and won in impressive style by two and a half lengths from the German colt Amarillo. On 4 August, Moonlight Cloud was matched against the leading British sprinter Lethal Force in the Prix Maurice de Gheest. Jarnet settled the filly behind the leaders before moving forward in the last 400 metres. She overtook Lethal Force 200 metres from the finish and quickened clear to win the race for the third time by one and three quarter lengths. A week later the mare was moved up to 1600m for the Prix Jacques Le Marois, in which she faced a strong field including Dawn Approach, Intello, Elusive Kate and Declaration of War. She took the lead in the straight and went clear of the field before holding off the late challenge of Olympic Glory to win by a short head.

On 6 October, Moonlight Cloud started the odds-on favourite for the Prix de la Forêt over 1400m at Longchamp. Jarnet held the mare up at the back of the field until 400m from the finish. Moonlight Cloud then accelerated past the other ten runners and went clear of the field to win easily by three lengths from the Irish gelding Gordon Lord Byron.

== Assessment ==
At the end of the 2011 Moonlight Cloud was officially rated as the joint 99th best horse in the world, with a rating of 118. In the following year she was rated at 121, making her the 46th best horse in the world.

== Retirement ==
It was announced 8 January 2014 that she would be retired and become a broodmare. This on the heels of the final start in December 2013 in the Hong Kong Mile where she finished sixth. She is booked for a breeding session with the noted stallion Galileo.

== Pedigree ==
Pedigree of Moonlight Cloud, bay filly, 2008
Sire Invincible Spirit (IRE) b. 1997	Green Desert (USA) b. 1983	Danzig b. 1977	Northern Dancer
Sire Invincible Spirit (IRE) b. 1997	Green Desert (USA) b. 1983	Danzig b. 1977	Pas de Nom
Sire Invincible Spirit (IRE) b. 1997	Green Desert (USA) b. 1983	Foreign Courier b. 1979	Sir Ivor
Sire Invincible Spirit (IRE) b. 1997	Green Desert (USA) b. 1983	Foreign Courier b. 1979	Courtly Dee
Sire Invincible Spirit (IRE) b. 1997	Rafha (GB) b. 1987	Kris ch. 1976	Sharpen Up
Sire Invincible Spirit (IRE) b. 1997	Rafha (GB) b. 1987	Kris ch. 1976	Doubly Sure
Sire Invincible Spirit (IRE) b. 1997	Rafha (GB) b. 1987	Eljazzi b. 1981	Artaius
Sire Invincible Spirit (IRE) b. 1997	Rafha (GB) b. 1987	Eljazzi b. 1981	Border Bounty
Dam Ventura (IRE) b. 1998	Spectrum (IRE) b. 1992	Rainbow Quest b. 1981	Blushing Groom
Dam Ventura (IRE) b. 1998	Spectrum (IRE) b. 1992	Rainbow Quest b. 1981	I Will Follow
Dam Ventura (IRE) b. 1998	Spectrum (IRE) b. 1992	River Dancer b. 1983	Irish River
Dam Ventura (IRE) b. 1998	Spectrum (IRE) b. 1992	River Dancer b. 1983	Dancing Shadow
Dam Ventura (IRE) b. 1998	Wedding Bouquet (IRE) b. 1987	Kings Lake b. 1978	Nijinsky
Dam Ventura (IRE) b. 1998	Wedding Bouquet (IRE) b. 1987	Kings Lake b. 1978	Fish-Bar
Dam Ventura (IRE) b. 1998	Wedding Bouquet (IRE) b. 1987	Doff the Derby b. 1981	Master Derby
Dam Ventura (IRE) b. 1998	Wedding Bouquet (IRE) b. 1987	Doff the Derby b. 1981	Margarethen

Note: b. = Bay, ch. = Chestnut
