= Fleeting Spirit =

Irish-bred Thoroughbred racehorse

- Sire: Invincible Spirit
- Grandsire: Green Desert
- Dam: Millennium Tale
- Damsire: Distant Relative
- Sex: Mare
- Foaled: 8 March 2005
- Country: Ireland
- Colour: Bay
- Breeder: Bernadette Hayden
- Owner: The Searchers syndicate
- Trainer: Jeremy Noseda
- Record: 16: 5-5-1
- Earnings: £ 695,549

Major wins
- Molecomb Stakes (2007); Flying Childers Stakes (2007); Temple Stakes (2008); July Cup (2009)

Awards
- European Champion Sprinter (2009)

Fleeting Spirit is a retired, Irish-bred Thoroughbred racehorse who was trained in the United Kingdom during a racing career which lasted from 2007 to 2010. She was a specialist sprinter, running all of her races over five and six furlongs. Fleeting Spirit was the highest-rated British-trained two-year-old filly of 2007 and went on to win the Group Two Temple Stakes at Haydock in 2008 and the Group One July Cup in 2009. In the last named year she was awarded the title of European Champion Sprinter at the Cartier Racing Awards.

== Background ==
Fleeting Spirit, a "delightful little" bay mare with a small white star, was bred at Kilcullen, County Kildare, Ireland by Bernadette Hayden. The success of Fleeting Spirit led to Mrs Hayden being named as outstanding small breeder of 2007 by the Irish Thoroughbred Breeders Association. Fleeting Spirit's sire Invincible Spirit was a sprinter who won the Haydock Sprint Cup in 2002. He has gone on to be a "leading" sire, getting the winners of more than five hundred races including Moonlight Cloud, Lawman (Prix du Jockey Club), Hooray (Cheveley Park Stakes) and Vale of York (Breeders' Cup Juvenile).

Fleeting Spirit was sent as a yearling to the Goffs sales in September 2006 where she was bought for €35,000 by Con Marnane, a bloodstock agent who specialised in "pinhooking"– buying horses at auction and then selling them on at a profit. Seven months later, Marnane's investment paid off at the Tattersalls "breeze-up" sale where the filly was sold for 90,000gns to Anthony Stroud acting on behalf of "The Searchers", a five-member syndicate which included Andy Stewart and Paul Roy. She was trained throughout her career at Newmarket, Suffolk by Jeremy Noseda.

== Racing career ==
=== 2007: two-year-old season ===
Fleeting Spirit made her racecourse debut in a maiden race at Nottingham in June. Ridden by Frankie Dettori, she led from the start and was never headed, winning by two lengths. Fleeting Spirit was prevented from running at Royal Ascot after contracting an infection and Jeremy Noseda decided to wait for Glorious Goodwood where she was moved up to Group Three class to run against colts in the Molecomb Stakes. Fleeting Spirit tracked the leaders before moving up to dispute the lead with Kingsgate Native .The two horses raced together in the final furlong before Fleeting Spirit gained the advantage and prevailed by a neck.

The filly was moved up to six furlongs for her next start in the Lowther Stakes at York, but after leading at the two furlong mark she was caught in the closing stages and finished third behind Nahoodh and the subsequently disqualified Visit. Just over an hour after her defeat, the form of her Goodwood win was boosted when Kingsgate Native defeated a field of older sprinters to win the Nunthorpe Stakes.

In September, Fleeting Spirit returned to five furlongs and started 5/4 favourite for the Flying Childers Stakes at Doncaster. Dettori sent the filly into the lead a furlong out and she beat Spirit of Sharjah by one and three quarter lengths. The result confirmed her status as "one of the fastest juveniles in training" Among the unplaced horses was the colt Dark Angel, who won the Group One Middle Park Stakes on his next start. On her final start of the year Fleeting Spirit again attempted six furlongs in the Group One Cheveley Park Stakes. She failed by a neck to catch the front-running, French-trained Natagora, with the two fillies finishing four lengths clear of the rest of the field. Noseda was positive in defeat saying that it was "disappointing to get beat but she's run a huge race.

=== 2008: three-year-old season ===
Instead of being aimed at the one mile 1000 Guineas, Fleeting Spirit was aimed at the top sprint races as a three-year-old. Noseda explained that "she is so fast and to try to get a mile is to destroy her natural asset". On her first start in May, she raced against colts and older horses in the Temple Stakes over five furlongs at Haydock Park. Ridden by Ryan Moore she broke from the stalls in a "sluggish" fashion and was behind in the early stages. Moore moved the filly up to challenge a furlong out and she quickened clear, winning by two lengths from Borderlescott who went on to win the next two runnings of the Nunthorpe Stakes. The winning time of 57.15 broke the track record by more than a second. Fleeting Spirit was then made 15/8 favourite for the Group One King's Stand Stakes at Royal Ascot in June. She again started slowly before producing a sustained late run to finish third, beaten half a length and a neck by Equiano and Takeover Target. Noseda later explained that Fleeting Spirit was a "sick" horse after the race, and that she never fully recovered in 2008.

Fleeting Spirit was off the course for almost four months before running in a bizarre renewal of the Prix de l'Abbaye at Longchamp. At the start of the race, Fleeting Spirit's stall failed to open, leaving the filly banging her head against the gate as the other runners set off. A false start was called, but several runners, headed by the Hungarian Champion Overdose ignored the recall and completed the race. The "result" was set aside and the race was re-run later in the afternoon although the connections of three of the runners who had completed the course declined to take part. Racing on soft ground for the first time, Fleeting Spirit looked outpaced at one stage, but finished strongly to be fifth of the seventeen runners, beaten just over three lengths by Marchand d'Or. On her final start of the year she finished fourth, beaten just over two lengths in the inaugural Breeders' Cup Turf Sprint at Santa Anita Park.

=== 2009: four-year-old season ===
Fleeting Spirit made a belated start to her championship season, first appearing in the King's Stand Stakes at Royal Ascot. Not for the first time she made a slow start and was towards the back of the field for the first half of the race. She finished strongly however, to finish second of fifteen starters, beaten three quarters of a length by the Australian-trained Scenic Blast. The July Cup at Newmarket attracted a strong international field, including Takeover Target and Scenic Blast from Australia, J J the Jet Plane from South Africa and African Rose (Haydock Sprint Cup) from France. Apart from Fleeting Spirit, the British runners included Equiano, Paco Boy, King's Apostle (Prix Maurice de Gheest) and Art Connoisseur (Golden Jubilee Stakes). Ridden by Tom Queally, Fleeting Spirit tracked the leaders before moving up to take the lead a furlong out. Although she veered first left and then right in the closing stages she ran on strongly to win by a length and a quarter from Main Aim in a time of 1:09.58. There was a stewards' inquiry into possible interference caused by Fleeting Spirit but the result was allowed to stand. Noseda paid tribute to the filly saying that,"she is back to her very best and that's the best she has ever run in her life. She is a very tough and talented filly."

Racing on soft ground in the Haydock Sprint Cup in September, Fleeting Spirit started the 100/30 favourite and took the lead a furlong out but was caught in the closing stages and beaten half a length by Regal Parade. A month later in the Prix de l'Abbaye she made her customary slow start and before finishing strongly, failing by a neck to catch Total Gallery. On her final start of the year she was sent back to Santa Anita, this time to contest the Breeders' Cup Sprint on the artificial Pro-Ride surface. She was unable to reach the lead but, in finishing seventh, she was beaten less than two and a half lengths by Dancing in Silks. Noseda felt that she had failed to settle in her unfamiliar surroundings and announced that she would stay in training for 2010.

=== 2010: five-year-old season ===
Fleeting Spirit did stay in training at five, but ran only twice and failed to recapture her best form as she struggled to overcome ankle injuries. She finished fourth to the Australian-bred Starspangledbanner in the Golden Jubilee Stakes in June and fifth behind the same horse in the July Cup.

Her retirement was announced in September by Jeremy Noseda who said that "the wear and tear from so many big runs has taken its toll and she owes us absolutely nothing, so it seems the right thing to do to retire her."

== Assessment ==
In the 2007 International Classification for two-year-olds Fleeting Spirit was rated the best British-trained filly and the third best filly in Europe behind Zarkava and Natagora. In the 2009 World Thoroughbred Racehorse Rankings Fleeting Spirit's rating of 118 was the highest for any European-trained sprinter. She had been rated 115 in the previous year.

in the 2009 Cartier Racing Awards she was named European Champion Sprinter.

== Breeding record ==
In her first season at stud, Fleeting Spirit was sent to be covered by the Derby winner Galileo. In April 2011 it was announced that a scan had confirmed she had conceived successfully and was "in foal". In February 2011, Fleeting Spirit produced her first foal, a filly by Galileo.

== Pedigree ==
Pedigree of Fleeting Spirit (IRE), bay mare, 2005
Sire Invincible Spirit (IRE) 1997	Green Desert; 1983	Danzig	Northern Dancer
Sire Invincible Spirit (IRE) 1997	Green Desert; 1983	Danzig	Pas de Nom
Sire Invincible Spirit (IRE) 1997	Green Desert; 1983	Foreign Courier	Sir Ivor
Sire Invincible Spirit (IRE) 1997	Green Desert; 1983	Foreign Courier	Courtly Dee
Sire Invincible Spirit (IRE) 1997	Rafha; 1987	Kris	Sharpen Up
Sire Invincible Spirit (IRE) 1997	Rafha; 1987	Kris	Doubly Sure
Sire Invincible Spirit (IRE) 1997	Rafha; 1987	Eljazzi	Artaius
Sire Invincible Spirit (IRE) 1997	Rafha; 1987	Eljazzi	Border Bounty
Dam Millennium Tale (FR) 1996	Distant Relative; 1986	Habitat	Sir Gaylord
Dam Millennium Tale (FR) 1996	Distant Relative; 1986	Habitat	Little Hut
Dam Millennium Tale (FR) 1996	Distant Relative; 1986	Royal Sister	Claude
Dam Millennium Tale (FR) 1996	Distant Relative; 1986	Royal Sister	Ribasha
Dam Millennium Tale (FR) 1996	The Bean Sidhe; 1983	Corvaro	Vaguely Noble
Dam Millennium Tale (FR) 1996	The Bean Sidhe; 1983	Corvaro	Delmora
Dam Millennium Tale (FR) 1996	The Bean Sidhe; 1983	Whiskey Mountain	Bold Hour
Dam Millennium Tale (FR) 1996	The Bean Sidhe; 1983	Whiskey Mountain	Touch the Clouds (Family: 2-e)
