= Artaius (horse) =

American-bred Thoroughbred racehorse (1974–1998)

- Racing silks of Jacqueline Getty
- Sire: Round Table
- Grandsire: Princequillo
- Dam: Stylish Pattern
- Damsire: My Babu
- Sex: Stallion
- Foaled: 26 February 1974
- Country: United States
- Colour: Bay
- Breeder: John Wesley Hanes II
- Owner: Jacqueline Getty Phillips
- Trainer: Vincent O'Brien
- Record: 7: 3-3-0
- Earnings: £91,308, F360,000

Major wins
- Classic Trial Stakes (1977); Eclipse Stakes (1977); Sussex Stakes (1977)

Awards
- Timeform rating: 129
- Last updated on 18 June 2022

Artaius (26 February 1974 – 17 June 1998) was an American-bred, Irish-trained Thoroughbred racehorse and sire. In a racing career which lasted from the autumn of 1976 until August 1977, he ran seven times and won three races. In 1977 he was one of the leading three-year-old colts in Europe, recording Group One successes in the Eclipse Stakes and Sussex Stakes. He was retired to stud at the end of the season and had limited success as a breeding stallion.

== Background ==
Artaius was a bay horse bred in Kentucky by John Wesley Hanes II. His sire, Round Table was one of the most successful grass specialists in American racing history, winning forty-three races and being named American Horse of the Year in 1958. He became a highly successful breeding stallion, being the Leading sire in North America in 1972. His dam, Stylish Pattern was descended from the influential broodmare Molly Adare, whose others descendants included Brigadier Gerard and Vintage Crop.

As a yearling, Artaius was offered for sale and bought for $110,000 by representatives of Mrs George Getty II. The colt was sent to Europe to be trained by Vincent O'Brien at Ballydoyle. He was ridden in most of his races by Lester Piggott.

== Racing career ==
Artaius did not run until the autumn of 1976 when he finished second to Orchestra in the Group Two Beresford Stakes over one mile at the Curragh.

On his first appearance as a three-year-old, Artaius was sent to England to contest the Group Three Classic Trial Stakes over ten furlongs at Sandown Park Racecourse. He started the evens favourite and won comfortably from Night Before. The colt returned to Ireland and was brought back in distance for the Irish 2000 Guineas at the Curragh and finished unplaced behind Pampapaul and The Minstrel.

Artaius was then sent to France to contest the Prix du Jockey Club at Chantilly Racecourse where he finished second, half a length behind Crystal Palace. In July Artaius was sent off at odds of 9/2 for the Group One Eclipse Stakes at Sandown Park. He led from the start and won in a race record time of 2:05.30 from Lucky Wednesday and Arctic Tern. A month later Artaius started the 6/4 favourite for the Sussex Stakes at Goodwood where his opponents included the classic winners Nebbiolo and Mrs McArdy. He led from the start again and won easily from Free State with Relkino in third place. At York Racecourse in August, Artaius started odds-on favourite for the sixth running of the Benson and Hedges Gold Cup. In a major upset he was beaten four lengths into second place by Relkino.

== Assessment ==
In 1977, Artaius was given a rating of 129 by the independent Timeform organisation, eight pounds behind his stable companion Alleged.

== Stud record ==
Artaius was retired from racing to become a breeding stallion in Ireland but was exported to Japan in 1984. He was not a noted sire of winners. Among the best of his offspring was the filly Flame of Tara, who won the Coronation Stakes and produced the outstanding racemare Salsabil and the St James's Palace Stakes winner Marju. In Japan he sired Osumi Roch, who won the Kyoto Daishoten and the Kyoto Kinen in 1992 as well as finishing third in the Takarazuka Kinen. He was also the damsire of the Prix de Diane winner Rafha, who produced the successful sire Invincible Spirit. He was "put out of stud" in Japan in November 1997.

== Pedigree ==
Pedigree of Artaius (USA), bay stallion, 1974
| Sire Round Table (USA) 1954 | Princequillo (IRE); 1940 | Prince Rose | Rose Prince |
| Sire Round Table (USA) 1954 | Princequillo (IRE); 1940 | Prince Rose | Indolence |
| Sire Round Table (USA) 1954 | Princequillo (IRE); 1940 | Cosquilla | Papyrus |
| Sire Round Table (USA) 1954 | Princequillo (IRE); 1940 | Cosquilla | Quick Thought |
| Sire Round Table (USA) 1954 | Knight's Daughter (GB); 1941 | Sir Cosmo | The Boss |
| Sire Round Table (USA) 1954 | Knight's Daughter (GB); 1941 | Sir Cosmo | Ayn Hali |
| Sire Round Table (USA) 1954 | Knight's Daughter (GB); 1941 | Feola | Friar Marcus |
| Sire Round Table (USA) 1954 | Knight's Daughter (GB); 1941 | Feola | Aloe |
| Dam Stylish Pattern (USA) 1961 | My Babu (FR); 1945 | Djebel | Tourbillon |
| Dam Stylish Pattern (USA) 1961 | My Babu (FR); 1945 | Djebel | Loika |
| Dam Stylish Pattern (USA) 1961 | My Babu (FR); 1945 | Perfume | Badruddin |
| Dam Stylish Pattern (USA) 1961 | My Babu (FR); 1945 | Perfume | Lavendula |
| Dam Stylish Pattern (USA) 1961 | Sunset Gun (GB); 1955 | Hyperion | Gainsborough |
| Dam Stylish Pattern (USA) 1961 | Sunset Gun (GB); 1955 | Hyperion | Selene |
| Dam Stylish Pattern (USA) 1961 | Sunset Gun (GB); 1955 | Ace of Spades | Atout Maitre |
| Dam Stylish Pattern (USA) 1961 | Sunset Gun (GB); 1955 | Ace of Spades | Brave Empress (Family:14-c) |
