= Donjuan Triumphant =

Irish-bred Thoroughbred racehorse

- Sire: Dream Ahead
- Grandsire: Diktat
- Dam: Mathuna
- Damsire: Tagula
- Sex: Stallion
- Foaled: 24 March 2013
- Country: Ireland
- Colour: Bay
- Breeder: Patrick Cosgrove & Dream Ahead Syndicate
- Owner: Middleham Park Racing LXXXVII; Abudiencia Co Ltd; King Power Racing
- Trainer: Richard Fahey; Andrew Balding
- Record: 37: 7-9-5
- Earnings: £805,013

Major wins
- Rockingham Stakes (2015); Critérium de Maisons-Laffitte (2015); 32Red Gold Cup (2017); Wentworth Stakes (2018); British Champions Sprint Stakes (2019)

Donjuan Triumphant (foaled 24 March 2013) is an Irish-bred Thoroughbred racehorse who excelled over sprint distances. He was rated one of the best two-year-olds in Europe when he won three of his eight races including the Rockingham Stakes and the Critérium de Maisons-Laffitte. He failed to win in the following year but ran second in both the Temple Stakes and the Prix Maurice de Gheest. After changing stables as a four-year-old he won the 32Red Gold Cup in 2017 and the Wentworth Stakes in 2018. In 2019 he was beaten in his first six starts but recorded his biggest win on his final racecourse appearance when he took the British Champions Sprint Stakes.

== Background ==
Donjuan Triumphant is a bay stallion with no white markings bred in Ireland by Patrick Cosgrove & Dream Ahead Syndicate. As a foal in November 2013 he was consigned by Kilcarn Park to Goffs sale and was bought for €58,000 by the Lynn Lodge Stud. He returned to the Goffs sales ring as a yearling but failed to reach his reserve price. In early 2015, the two-year-old colt was entered in the Tattersalls "breeze-up" sale (in which the horses are publicly galloped before being auctioned) and was bought for 30,000 guineas by Middleham Park Racing. He was sent into training with Richard Fahey at Malton, North Yorkshire. His name is a reference to the fictional opera written by the title character in the novel The Phantom of the Opera.

He was from the first crop of foals sired by Dream Ahead, an outstanding sprinter from the Godolphin Arabian sire-line whose wins included the Prix Morny, Middle Park Stakes, July Cup, Haydock Sprint Cup and Prix de la Forêt. As a breeding stallion, his other progeny have included Glass Slippers, Dream of Dreams and Al Wukair (Prix Jacques Le Marois). Donjuan Triumphant' dam Mathuna showed modest racing ability, winning on her debut, but failing to repeat that success in eight subsequent starts. She was descended from the Mariella who won the Premio Roma and was a half-sister to Sagaro.

== Racing career ==
=== 2015: two-year-old season ===
Donjuan Triumphant made his racecourse debut in a maiden race over six furlongs at Redcar Racecourse on 20 June 2015 in which he started at odds of 4/1 and finished second of the eight runners, beaten a head by Receding Waves. He then sustained similarly narrow defeats in maidens at Ayr and Carlisle in July before being beaten a short head by Receding Waves in a nursery (a handicap race for juveniles) at Haydock Park on 5 September. Two weeks later the colt started at odds of 4/1 in an eighteen-runner nursery at Ayr in which he was ridden by the apprentice jockey Jack Garritty and recorded his first victory as he took the lead a furlong out and drew away to win "readily" by three and a quarter lengths.

At York Racecourse on 10 October Donjuan Triumphant was stepped up in class for the Listed Rockingham Stakes and was made the 9/4 favourite against seven opponents. With Garritty again in the saddle he tracked the leaders before producing a strong late run to take the lead 50 yards from the finish and won by one and a half lengths from Dhamaan. Six days after his win at York the colt was sent to France to contest the Group 2 Critérium de Maisons-Laffitte over 1200 metres on soft ground in which he was partnered by Alexis Badel. He went off the 10.5/1 fifth choice in a seven-runner field which also included Smash Williams (Round Tower Stakes), Log Out Island (Two-Year-Old Trophy) and Yakaba (Prix d'Arenberg). After being restrained in the early stages, Donjuan Triumphant took the lead 200 metres from the finish and pulled clear in the final stages to win by five and a half lengths. Middleham Park Racing's representative Ian Alexander said "He has really improved in his last three runs, going from strength to strength, and that was a great performance... The soft ground was an unknown factor, but when Alexis pressed the button he flew."

On his final run of the year Donjuan Triumphant returned to France and started favourite for the Critérium International over 1400 metres at Saint-Cloud Racecourse on 1 November, but never looked likely to win and finished fourth behind Johannes Vermeer, Stormy Antarctic and Attendu.

In the official European classification of two-year-olds for 2015, Donjuan Triumphant was given a rating of 115, nine pounds behind the top-ranked Air Force Blue, making him the tenth best juvenile of the season.

=== 2016: three-year-old season ===
Donjuan Triumphant began his second season by finishing second to the filly Quiet Reflection in the Temple Stakes at Haydock on 28 May and then ran unplaced behind the same filly in the Commonwealth Cup at Royal Ascot in June. On 7 August he was sent to France for the third time and produced his best run of the season as he finished second to Signs of Blessing in the Group 1 Prix Maurice de Gheest over 1300 metres at Deauville Racecourse making steady progress in the last 300 metres without ever seriously challenging the winner. In his next two races he made little impact as he finished towards the rear of the field behind Quiet Reflection in the Haydock Sprint Cup and The Tin Man in the British Champions Sprint Stakes. Towards the end of the year the colt was campaigned in minor races on synthetic tracks, finishing third in minor events at Kempton and Lingfield in November and second in a stakes race at Chelmsford on 22 December.

=== 2017: four-year-old season ===
Before the start of the 2017 Donjuan Triumphant was bought privately by Vichai Srivaddhanaprabha and transferred to the stable of Andrew Balding at Kingsclere in Hampshire. He was officially owned by Abudiencia Co Ltd until switching to Srivaddhanaprabha's King Power Racing in July of that and carried their blue and white colours for the rest of his track career.

In April the horse finished unplaced on the polytrack at Lingfield and third in the King Richard III Stakes at Leicester Racecourse before returning from a lengthy absence to finish ninth under a weight of 131 pounds in the Stewards' Cup at Goodwood Racecourse on 7 August. A month later Donjuan Triumphant was ridden by P. J. McDonald in a minor race over seven furlongs at Haydock and recorded his first win since 2015 as he led from the start and came home one and a quarter lengths in front of his five opponents. He was scheduled to contest the Ayr Gold Cup at Ayr Racecourse at on 23 September but when the Scottish track was found to be unraceable because of waterlogging the race was transferred to Haydock and run a week later. With McDonald in the saddle he went off at odds of 13/2 in a seventeen-runner field, carrying top weight of 136 pounds. He started slowly but made ground steadily in the last quarter mile, caught the leader Stake Acclaim in the final strides, and won by a short head.

On 21 October Donjuan Triumphant was moved back up to Group 1 class for the British Champions Sprint Stakes at Ascot but made little impact and finished eighth of the twelve runners behind Librisa Breeze.

=== 2018: five-year-old season ===
After beginning his fourth campaign on polytrack, finishing fifth at Kempton in January and at Southwell Racecourse in March, Donjuan Triumphant returned to the turf in April and finished runner-up to Emmaus in his second attempt to win the King Richard III Stakes. He continued to be campaigned over seven furlongs on his next two starts and finished a close fourth to Sir Dancealot in the Lennox Stakes at Goodwood before coming home last of the nine runners behind Expert Eye in the City of York Stakes at York in August. When dropped back to six furlongs he showed improved form against top class sprinters, finishing fourth to The Tin Man in the Haydock Sprint Cup and third to Sands of Mali in the British Champions Sprint Stakes.

A week after Donjuan Triumphant's defeat at Ascot Vichai Srivaddhanaprabha was killed in the 2018 Leicester helicopter crash. On 10 November on soft ground at Doncaster Racecourse the horse was dropped to Listed class for the Wentworth Stakes, in which he was ridden by James Doyle and started the 2/1 favourite against thirteen opponents. After being in contention from the start he took second place a furlong found and caught the leader Hey Jonesey in the final strides to win by a head. Andrew Balding commented on the death of the owner, saying "It puts horse racing and the triviality of other things in life into perspective" before saying of the winner "He really loves this ground. The punters thought he had a really good chance today, and he's just so tough."

=== 2019: six-year-old season ===
In all of his races as a six-year-old Donjuan Triumphant was ridden by Silvestre de Sousa who usually employed front-running tactics. The horse began his campaign by finishing last of six behind Hey Gaman in his third attempt in the Richard III Stakes and then ran second to Brando in the Clyde Stakes at Hamilton Park in June. In July he finished fourth to German horse Waldpfad in the Hackwood Stakes at Newbury Racecourse and then finished eighth of nine behind Sir Dancealot in the Lennox Stakes. In August at Newbury he finished sixth of seven behind Glorious Journey in the Hungerford Stakes after leading until the final furlong. The Bengough Stakes at Ascot on 5 October saw a change of tactics as the horse was restrained in the early stages before finishing strongly to take second place behind the favourite Cape Byron.

Two weeks after his second place in the Bengough Stakes, Donjuan Triumphant made his fourth attempt to win the British Champions Sprint Stakes and started a 33/1 outsider in a seventeen-runner field. Advertise and One Master started joint-favourites while the other contenders included Hello Youmzain, Cape Byron, The Tin Man, Sands of Mali, Librisa Breeze, Brando and Mabs Cross. After racing in mid-division Donjuan Triumphant was repeatedly hampered as he struggled to obtain a clear run in the last quarter mile before making a strong late run to take the lead 75 yards from the finish and win by a length from One Master. After the race Balding said "I'm just so thrilled. He was the first one 'The Chairman' (Srivaddhanaprabha) ever bought, and he'd be so proud of him right now. I'm just so pleased to get a Group 1 for King Power and for a horse like this that has been knocking on the door for so long. He's due to go to stud in France now, and I hope he has a long and happy life."

In the 2019 World's Best Racehorse Rankings Donjuan Triumphant was given a rating of 118, making him the 78th best racehorse in the world.

== Stud career ==
Donjuan Triumphant was retired at the end of 2019 and began his career as a breeding stallion at the Haras de la Barbottiere, Sablé-sur-Sarthe in 2020 at a fee of €4,000.

== Pedigree ==
Pedigree of Donjuan Triumphant (GB), bay stallion, 2013
Sire Dream Ahead (USA) 2008	Diktat (GB); 1995	Warning	Known Fact (USA)
Sire Dream Ahead (USA) 2008	Diktat (GB); 1995	Warning	Slightly Dangerous (USA)
Sire Dream Ahead (USA) 2008	Diktat (GB); 1995	Arvola	Sadler's Wells (USA)
Sire Dream Ahead (USA) 2008	Diktat (GB); 1995	Arvola	Park Appeal (IRE)
Sire Dream Ahead (USA) 2008	Land of Dreams (GB); 1995	Cadeaux Genereux	Young Generation (IRE)
Sire Dream Ahead (USA) 2008	Land of Dreams (GB); 1995	Cadeaux Genereux	Smarten Up
Sire Dream Ahead (USA) 2008	Land of Dreams (GB); 1995	Sahara Star	Green Desert (USA)
Sire Dream Ahead (USA) 2008	Land of Dreams (GB); 1995	Sahara Star	Vaigly Star
Dam Mathuna (IRE) 2004	Tagula (IRE); 1993	Taufan (USA)	Stop The Music
Dam Mathuna (IRE) 2004	Tagula (IRE); 1993	Taufan (USA)	Stolen Date
Dam Mathuna (IRE) 2004	Tagula (IRE); 1993	Twin Island	Standaan (FR)
Dam Mathuna (IRE) 2004	Tagula (IRE); 1993	Twin Island	Jolly Widow
Dam Mathuna (IRE) 2004	Sigonella (IRE); 1996	Priolo (USA)	Sovereign Dancer
Dam Mathuna (IRE) 2004	Sigonella (IRE); 1996	Priolo (USA)	Premiere
Dam Mathuna (IRE) 2004	Sigonella (IRE); 1996	Stelllina	Caerleon (USA)
Dam Mathuna (IRE) 2004	Sigonella (IRE); 1996	Stelllina	Mariella (GB) (Family: 4-l)
