= Dream of Dreams =

Irish-bred Thoroughbred racehorse

- Sire: Dream Ahead
- Grandsire: Diktat
- Dam: Vasilia
- Damsire: Dansili
- Sex: Gelding
- Foaled: 7 February 2014
- Country: Ireland
- Colour: Chestnut
- Breeder: Prostock Ltd
- Owner: Saeed Suhail
- Trainer: Kevin Ryan; Michael Stoute
- Record: 30: 8-9-2
- Earnings: £526,149

Major wins
- Wentworth Stakes (2017); Leisure Stakes (2019, 2021); Hungerford Stakes (2020); Haydock Sprint Cup (2020); Diamond Jubilee Stakes (2021)

Dream of Dreams (foaled 7 February 2014) is an Irish-bred, British-trained Thoroughbred racehorse. He showed promising form as a two-year-old in 2016 when he won one race and was placed in the Railway Stakes and the Rockingham Stakes and went on to win two races including the Wentworth Stakes in the following year. As a four-year-old in 2018 he failed to win but was placed in several major sprint races. In 2019 he won two races including the Leisure Stakes and ran second in the Diamond Jubilee Stakes before being gelded at the end of the year. As a six-year-old, he finished second in the Diamond Jubilee Stakes again before winning the Hungerford Stakes and the Haydock Sprint Cup.

== Background ==
Dream of Dreams is a chestnut horse with a white blaze and white socks on his hind legs bred in Ireland by James Cloney's County Kilkenny-based Prostock Ltd. As a foal in November 2014 he was consigned to the Tattersalls sale and was bought for 37,000 guineas by the bloodstock agent Mick Flanagan. At Doncaster in 2015 he was again offered for sale but failed to make his reserve price of £44,000. He entered the ownership of Saeed Suhail and was sent into training with Kevin Ryan at Hambleton, North Yorkshire.

He was from the second crop of foals sired by Dream Ahead, an outstanding sprinter from the Godolphin Arabian sire-line whose wins included the Prix Morny, Middle Park Stakes, July Cup, Haydock Sprint Cup and Prix de la Forêt. As a breeding stallion, his other progeny have included Donjuan Triumphant, Glass Slippers and Al Wukair (Prix Jacques Le Marois). Dream of Dreams' dam Vasilia was an unraced daughter of the broodmare Kangra Valley, making her a half-sister to Airwave and Jwala.

== Racing career ==
=== 2016: two-year-old season ===
On his racecourse debut at Newmarket Racecourse on 13 April 2016 Dream of Dreams started at odds of 10/1 for a five furlong novice race (for horses with no more than two previous wins) and finished strongly to finish second behind the odds-on favourite Sutter County. In a similar contest over six furlongs on 27 May at Haydock Park he started favourite and led from the start to win by half a length from Waqaas and record his first success. In the following month he was sent to Ireland and stepped up in class for the Group 2 Railway Stakes at the Curragh in which he came home third behind Medicine Jack and Peace Envoy, beaten two lengths by the winner. In the Gimcrack Stakes at York Racecourse in August he tracked the leaders till half way but abruptly lost his galloping action and had to be pulled up and dismounted by his rider. In September he started favourite for a minor race at Doncaster Racecourse but was beaten into second place by the 16/1 outsider Lost At Sea, with Battaash taking third place. He ended his season in the Listed Rockingham Stakes at York in October in which he finished second to Sir Dancealot after leading until the last 100 yards.

=== 2017: three-year-old season ===
Dream of Dreams began his second campaign by finishing second to the filly Equimou in a minor race at Hamilton Park Racecourse on 7 May. Before the end of the month he was transferred to the Freemason Lodge stable of Michael Stoute at Newmarket, Suffolk. On his first appearance for his new trainer he ran poorly as he came home tenth of the eleven runners behind the four-year-old Gifted Master in the Listed Hopeful Stakes on 26 August at Newmarket. On 16 September the colt started at odds of 7/2 for a minor race over seven furlongs on good to soft ground at Lingfield Park. Ridden by Kieran Shoemark he led from the start before drawing right away from his opponents in the final furlong to win "comfortably" by five lengths. Six days later the colt lined up for the Dubai Duty Free Cup at Newbury Racecourse in which he took the lead approaching the final furlong but was outpaced in the closing stages and came home fifth, one and three quarter lengths behind the winner Tabarrak.

On his final run of the year Dream of Dreams contested the Listed Wentworth Stakes over six furlongs on soft ground at Doncaster on 11 November and started the 5/1 second favourite behind Sir Dancealot in a fourteen-runner field. With Jim Crowley in the saddle he raced just behind the leaders before gaining the advantage inside the final furlong and prevailed by a length from the seven-year-old Perfect Pasture. Saeed Suhail's racing manager Bruce Raymond commented "We think this is his best distance... He used to miss the kick a lot. He gave himself plenty to do, but Michael ironed out those problems. He put a rug on him at the gate... He's had niggly problems but has got over them now. He's going to have to step up into Group company but he needs soft ground."

=== 2018: four-year-old season ===
In 2018 Dream of Dreams was campaigned in high-class sprint events but failed to win in eight races. On his seasonal debut he finished seventh to Brando in the Abernant Stakes at Newmarket in April. After a break of over two months returned to run fifth to Above The Law in the Chipchase Stakes at Newcastle Racecourse on 30 June and then came home fifth to Judicial in the Coral Charge at Sandown Park a week later. Later in July at Newbury he produced a strong late run to finish a close third behind Yafta and Projection in the Hackwood Stakes. In August he was stepped up to seven furlongs and showed improved form as he finished runner up in both the Hungerford Stakes at Newbury (beaten one and three quarter lengths by Sir Dancealot) and the Supreme Stakes at Goodwood Racecourse (beaten three quarters of a length by the filly Anna Nerium after leading until the last 100 yards). In the Bengough Stakes at Ascot Racecourse on 6 October he started the odds on favourite but was beaten a neck by Projection after hanging to the left in the closing stages. Two weeks later he was moved up to Group 1 class for the first time to contest the British Champions Sprint Stakes at the same track and came home thirteenth of the fourteen runners behind Sands of Mali after fading badly in the last quarter mile.

=== 2019: five-year-old season ===
Dream of Dreams began his 2019 campaign on the synthetic Polytrack surface at Chelmsford City Racecourse when he started 6/4 favourite for a conditions race over six furlongs on 25 April. Ridden by Ryan Moore he recorded his first victory in seventeen months as took the lead inside the final furlong and won "readily" by one and three quarter lengths from Hey Jonesy. Moore was again in the saddle when the horse started 11/4 second favourite behind The Tin Man for the Leisure Stakes over six furlongs at Windsor Racecourse on 20 May. After racing in third place behind Foxtrot Lady and Glorious Journey he took the lead 100 yards from the finish and won by a length in "quite decisive" fashion. Moore commented "I think he's definitely an improved horse... I thought it was a really good performance today. He's in a good place mentally, moved nicely, is doing things right – and he’ll be winning at a higher level, with a bit of luck."

On 22 June at Royal Ascot Dream of Dreams was ridden by Daniel Tudhope in the Group 1 Diamond Jubilee Stakes and produced his best performance up to that point as he produced a strong late run from the rear of the field and failed by only a head to peg back the favourite Blue Point. He failed to reproduce his Royal Ascot form in three subsequent starts that year as he finished tenth behind Ten Sovereigns in the July Cup, eighth behind Hello Youmzain in the Haydock Sprint Cup and sixteenth behind Donjuan Triumphant in the British Champions Sprint Stakes. Shortly after his final run of the year Dream of Dreams was gelded.

=== 2020: six-year-old season ===
The 2020 flat racing season in England and Ireland was disrupted by the COVID-19 pandemic and Dream of Dreams did not make his reappearance until 20 June at Royal Ascot when he made his second attempt to win the Diamond Jubilee Stakes. In a repeat of his 2019 effort he kept on strongly in the closing stages but narrowly failed to claim the Group 1 prize as he finished second by a head to Hello Youmzain, with the favourite Sceptical a neck away in third place. On 15 August the gelding was ridden by Oisin Murphy when he started the 13/8 favourite for the Hungerford Stakes at Newbury with the best fancied of his eight opponents being Surf Dancer (winner of the King Charles II Stakes), Glorious Journey (Al Fahidi Fort), and Breathtaking Look (Sceptre Stakes). After tracking the leaders Dream of Dreams went to the front two furlongs out and drew away in "impressive" style to win by seven lengths. His win came less than a week after the death of Michael Stoute's partner Coral Pritchard-Gordon. Stoute's assistant James Horton said "It will mean a lot to everyone. It is a very sad time at Freemason Lodge at the moment. Coral was a rock for everyone in the yard, the boss more than anyone." Commenting on Dream of Dreams he also said "He always threatened to win a big one and I’m delighted for everyone at home that has done a great job with him. He has been knocking on the door, this lad. He has been second in two Diamond Jubilees and has been very unlucky not to win either... I think he is very versatile and can go six or seven. He just needs a nice pace and something to aim at."

In the Haydock Sprint Cup on 5 September, with Murphy in the saddle, Dream of Dreams went off the 5/2 favourite in a thirteen-runner field which included Hello Youmzain, The Tin Man, Golden Horde, Brando, Tabdeed (Hackwood Stakes), Glen Shiel, Art Power (Lacken Stakes) and Lope Y Fernandez (Round Tower Stakes). The field split into two groups with Dream of Dreams tracking the leader Art Power on the near side (the right hand side from the jockeys' viewpoint). He edged to the left to make his challenge in the last quarter mile, gained the advantage inside the final furlong and won by one and three quarter lengths from Glen Shiel. After the race Murphy said I was really excited about getting back on him as he gave me an incredible feel at Newbury and I'm thrilled he backed it up. He traveled well and picked up well to the line. He didn't have that electric burst he showed at Newbury, but he was very good. I'm thrilled for Sir Michael and his team, after losing his partner Coral, it's been a tough few weeks and hopefully that will give him a lift." Saeed Suhail's representative Philip Robinson, said "He's been gelded and is just discovering what ability he has got. The way he went and won at Newbury did him the world of good. He's thriving and now he's got his confidence, it's onwards and upwards. He's 6 years old and could be a better 7-year-old."

At Ascot on 17 October Dream of Dreams ran for the third time in the British Champions Sprint Stakes. He started the 3/1 favourite but after going strongly for most of the way he faded badly in the last quarter mile and came home eighth of the sixteen runners behind Glen Shiel.

In the 2020 World's Best Racehorse Rankings, Dream of Dreams was rated on 120, making him the equal 40th best racehorse in the world.

== Pedigree ==
Pedigree of Dream of Dreams (IRE), chestnut gelding, 2014
Sire Dream Ahead (USA) 2008	Diktat (GB); 1995	Warning	Known Fact (USA)
Sire Dream Ahead (USA) 2008	Diktat (GB); 1995	Warning	Slightly Dangerous (USA)
Sire Dream Ahead (USA) 2008	Diktat (GB); 1995	Arvola	Sadler's Wells (USA)
Sire Dream Ahead (USA) 2008	Diktat (GB); 1995	Arvola	Park Appeal (IRE)
Sire Dream Ahead (USA) 2008	Land of Dreams (GB); 1995	Cadeaux Genereux	Young Generation (IRE)
Sire Dream Ahead (USA) 2008	Land of Dreams (GB); 1995	Cadeaux Genereux	Smarten Up
Sire Dream Ahead (USA) 2008	Land of Dreams (GB); 1995	Sahara Star	Green Desert (USA)
Sire Dream Ahead (USA) 2008	Land of Dreams (GB); 1995	Sahara Star	Vaigly Star
Dam Vasilia (GB) 2004	Dansili (GB); 1996	Danehill (USA)	Danzig
Dam Vasilia (GB) 2004	Dansili (GB); 1996	Danehill (USA)	Razyana
Dam Vasilia (GB) 2004	Dansili (GB); 1996	Hasili (IRE)	Kahyasi
Dam Vasilia (GB) 2004	Dansili (GB); 1996	Hasili (IRE)	Kerali (GB)
Dam Vasilia (GB) 2004	Kangra Valley (GB); 1991	Indian Ridge (IRE)	Ahonoora (GB)
Dam Vasilia (GB) 2004	Kangra Valley (GB); 1991	Indian Ridge (IRE)	Hillbrow (GB)
Dam Vasilia (GB) 2004	Kangra Valley (GB); 1991	Thorner Lane	Tina's Pet
Dam Vasilia (GB) 2004	Kangra Valley (GB); 1991	Thorner Lane	Spinner (Family: 19-a)
