= Diktat (horse) =

British-bred Thoroughbred racehorse

- Sire: Warning
- Grandsire: Known Fact
- Dam: Arvola
- Damsire: Sadler's Wells
- Sex: Stallion
- Foaled: 25 February 1995
- Country: United Kingdom
- Colour: Brown
- Breeder: Sheikh Mohammed
- Owner: Sheikh Mohammed; Godolphin
- Trainer: David Loder; Saeed bin Suroor
- Record: 14: 7-2-1
- Earnings: £537,665

Major wins
- Jersey Stakes (1998); Shergar Cup Seven Stakes (1999); Criterion Stakes (1999); Prix Maurice de Gheest (1999); Haydock Sprint Cup (1999)

Diktat (25 February 1995 – 8 September 2017) was a British Thoroughbred racehorse and sire. He spent most of his racing career at distances of around seven furlongs but recorded his two biggest wins when dropped to sprint distances. Unplaced on his only start as a two-year-old in 1997 he showed improved form in 1998, winning his first three races including the Jersey Stakes but missed the second half of the season. He returned as a four-year-old to win four major races from five starts: his victories came in the Shergar Cup Seven Stakes, Criterion Stakes, Prix Maurice de Gheest and the Haydock Sprint Cup. He failed to win in 2000 but finished second in the Yasuda Kinen and third in the Prix du Moulin. He stood as a breeding stallion in England, France, Japan and Spain and sired several important winners including Dream Ahead and Rajeem.

== Background ==
Diktat was a brown horse with a white blaze and a white sock on his left hind leg bred in England by his owner Sheikh Mohammed. The colt was initially sent into training with David Loder in Newmarket, Suffolk.

Diktat was probably the best horse sired by the outstanding miler Warning whose other progeny included Piccolo, Charnwood Forest (Queen Anne Stakes), Decorated Hero (Challenge Stakes) and Annus Mirabilis (Dubai Duty Free). Warning was a male-line descendant of the Godolphin Arabian, unlike more than 95% of modern thoroughbreds, who trace their ancestry to the Darley Arabian. Diktat's dam Arvola, won one minor race from four starts, but was exceptionally bred, being sired by the multiple Champion sire Sadler's Wells out of Park Appeal a successful racemare who also produced Cape Cross. Park Appeal's dam Blidaress was also the ancestor of Desirable, Shadayid and Russian Rhythm.

== Racing career ==
=== 1997: two-year-old season ===
Diktat made his only appearance as a two-year-old in a maiden race over seven furlongs on good to firm ground at Leicester Racecourse on 9 September 1997. Ridden by Willie Ryan he started at odds of 9/1 in an eighteen-runner field. After appearing to have every chance of winning three furlongs out he began to struggle and was eased down by Ryan and finished seventh, six and three quarter lengths behind the winner Mudeer.

=== 1998: three-year-old season ===
On his three-year-old debut, Diktat started 6/4 favourite against sixteen opponents in a seven-furlong maiden at Newmarket Racecourse on 14 April. Ridden by Darryll Holland he took the lead inside the final furlong and drew away to win by four lengths from the John Gosden-trained Mubrik. In May he started 5/4 favourite for a minor races over the same distance at Leicester and won "comfortably" by one and a half lengths from Rami. On 17 June the colt was stepped up in class for the Group Three Jersey Stakes at Royal Ascot in which he was gain partnered by Holland. He was made the 3/1 favourite in a sixteen-runner field with his main rivals appearing to be Bold Fact (July Stakes), Bianconi (fourth in the Irish 2,000 Guineas), Volontiers (Surrey Stakes) and the Michael Stoute-trained filly Lovers Knot. After being restrained in the early stages he took the lead approaching the final furlong and ran on well to win by two lengths from Bold Edge.

Diktat was matched against older horses for the first time in the Beeswing Stakes at Newcastle Racecourse on 25 July in which he was ridden by Jimmy Fortune and started 4/11 favourite against three opponents headed by Decorated Hero, a six-year-old who had already won three Group races. The closing stages saw the race develop into a prolonged struggle between Diktat and Decorated Hero, with the older horse prevailing by a head.

Diktat did not race again in 1998. He was transferred to his owner's Godolphin stable and was trained for the rest of his racing career by Saeed bin Suroor.

=== 1999: four-year-old season ===
After an absence of well over nine months, Diktat returned in the inaugural Shergar Cup at Goodwood Racecourse on 8 May when he represented the "Rest of the World" team and was ridden, as in all his races that year, by Frankie Dettori. In the seven-furlong leg of the contest, he was made the 11/10 favourite ahead of Russian Revival (Dubai Duty Free Cup), Ramooz (Minstrel Stakes), Tomba (Prix de la Forêt) and Keos (Prix de Seine-et-Oise). The favourite was held up by Dettori and had some difficulty obtaining a clear run but then accelerated in "impressive" style to take the lead in the final strides and in by half a length from Russian Revival.

On 26 June the colt started odds-on favourite for the Group Three Van Geest Criterion Stakes at Newmarket despite carrying top weight of 133 pounds. After tracking the leader Cool Edge he took the lead a furlong out and won by one and a half lengths from the Solario Stakes winner Raise A Grand. Godolphin's racing manager Simon Crisford commented That was very pleasing... He wasn't risked on it as a three-year-old, but he's stronger and more mature now. He will be perfect coming off a strong pace and we hope that he will be a genuine Group One contender." Diktat was then moved up to Group One level for the first time when he was sent to France for the Prix Maurice de Gheest over 1300 metres on very soft ground at Deauville Racecourse on 8 August. In France, horses in the same ownership are coupled for betting purposes and Diktat started the 4/5 favourite together with Sheikh Mohammed's other runner Bertolini, the winner of the July Stakes and European Free Handicap. Keos and Tomba were again in opposition, as well as Gold Away (Prix du Muguet), Bianconi (Diadem Stakes), Orpen (Prix Morny) and Sampower Star (Duke of York Stakes). Diktat was restrained by Dettori before beginning to make progress on the outside 400 metres from the finish. He took the lead 200 metres out and won by a length from Gold Away, with Bertolini half a length back in third place. After the race Saeed bin Suroor said "He's got a very good turn of foot. Diktat had never run on this sort of ground before, so we can now assume he acts on all surfaces. I was very happy with him before the race and the colt is improving all the time. This looked the perfect distance for him".

Diktat returned to England and started 13/8 favourite for the Stanley Leisure Sprint Cup on good to firm ground at Haydock Park on 4 September. The sixteen-runner field included Bertolini, Bold Edge, Sampower Star and Tomba, as well as Wannabe Grand, Arkadian Hero (Mill Reef Stakes), Imperial Beauty (Dick Poole Stakes), Grazia (Hackwood Stakes), Halmahera (Cornwallis Stakes) and Pipalong (Two-Year-Old Trophy). Bertolini set the pace with Diktat racing towards the rear of the field in the early stages. The favourite appeared to be under pressure but was switched to the left inside the final furlong and caught Bertolini in the closing strides to win by a neck. After the race Dettori commented "It was really a question of not losing too much ground early on so I could have a shot at the finish, but I must admit I was worried at the furlong marker when I was still three lengths behind Bertolini".

On his final start of the year Diktat was sent to France again and started odds-on favourite for the Prix de la Forêt over 1400 metres at Longchamp Racecourse on 17 October. After turning into the straight in tenth place he made steady progress but finished fifth in a blanket finish behind Field of Hope. It was Diktat's first defeat in over fourteen months.

=== 2000: five-year-old season ===
In the spring of 2000 Diktat was sent to represent Godolphin in Japan. On 14 May he finished sixth to Stinger in the Keio Hai Spring Cup at Tokyo Racecourse with Grass Wonder in ninth. On 4 June he was ridden by Daragh O'Donohoe when he contested the Yasuda Kinen over 1600 metres at the same track. He produced what was arguably his best performance as he proved too good for the sixteen Japanese runners but was beaten a length into second place by the Hong Kong champion Fairy King Prawn.

Diktat returned to Europe but did not reappear on the track until 3 September when he started the 1.9/1 second favourite (coupled with Fly to the Stars) for the Prix du Moulin over 1600 metres at Longchamp. He stayed on in the closing stages without looking likely to win and finished third behind the four-year-olds Indian Lodge and Kingsalsa. The favoured Dansili finished sixth. On his final racecourse appearance Diktat started a 20/1 outsider for the Queen Elizabeth II Stakes at Ascot on 23 September and finished sixth of the twelve runners behind Observatory.

== Stud record ==
At the end of his racing career Diktat was retired to become a breeding stallion at his owner's Dalham Hall Stud. He was later relocated to France in 2007 and Japan in 2008 before moving to the Dehesa de Milagro in Spain in 2010 and pensioned in December 2015 and died on 8 September 2017. The best of his offspring was Dream Ahead who won five Group One races and emulated his sire by winning the Haydock Sprint Cup in 2011. His other good winners included Rajeem, Formal Decree (Al Rashidiya, Knickerbocker Handicap), Definightly (Prix de Seine-et-Oise, Sapphire Stakes), Short Skirt (Musidora Stakes, St Simon Stakes), First City (Cape Verdi), Skins Game (Prix Edmond Blanc) and First Selection (Solario Stakes).

== Sire line tree ==
- Diktat
  - Formal Decree
  - Definightly
  - Skins Game
  - Dream Ahead
    - Donjuan Triumphant
    - Al Wukair
    - Dream of Dreams
    - Sensei
  - First Selection

== Pedigree ==
Pedigree of Diktat (GB), brown stallion, 1995
Sire Warning (GB) 1985	Known Fact (USA); 1977	In Reality	Intentionally
Sire Warning (GB) 1985	Known Fact (USA); 1977	In Reality	My Dear Girl
Sire Warning (GB) 1985	Known Fact (USA); 1977	Tamerett	Tim Tam
Sire Warning (GB) 1985	Known Fact (USA); 1977	Tamerett	Mixed Marriage
Sire Warning (GB) 1985	Slightly Dangerous (USA); 1979	Roberto	Hail To Reason
Sire Warning (GB) 1985	Slightly Dangerous (USA); 1979	Roberto	Bramalea
Sire Warning (GB) 1985	Slightly Dangerous (USA); 1979	Where You Lead	Raise a Native
Sire Warning (GB) 1985	Slightly Dangerous (USA); 1979	Where You Lead	Noblesse
Dam Arvola (GB) 1990	Sadler's Wells (USA); 1981	Northern Dancer	Nearctic
Dam Arvola (GB) 1990	Sadler's Wells (USA); 1981	Northern Dancer	Natalma
Dam Arvola (GB) 1990	Sadler's Wells (USA); 1981	Fairy Bridge	Bold Reason
Dam Arvola (GB) 1990	Sadler's Wells (USA); 1981	Fairy Bridge	Special
Dam Arvola (GB) 1990	Park Appeal (IRE); 1982	Ahonoora	Lorenzaccio
Dam Arvola (GB) 1990	Park Appeal (IRE); 1982	Ahonoora	Helen Nichols
Dam Arvola (GB) 1990	Park Appeal (IRE); 1982	Balidaress	Balidar
Dam Arvola (GB) 1990	Park Appeal (IRE); 1982	Balidaress	Innocence (Family: 14-c)
