= Rajeem =

British-bred Thoroughbred racehorse

- Sire: Diktat
- Grandsire: Warning
- Dam: Magic Sister
- Damsire: Cadeaux Genereux
- Sex: Mare
- Foaled: 27 February 2003
- Country: United Kingdom
- Colour: Bay
- Breeder: Usk Valley Stud
- Owner: Saeed Manana
- Trainer: Clive Brittain
- Record: 10: 3-0-0
- Earnings: £140,152

Major wins
- Montrose Stakes (2005); Falmouth Stakes (2006)

Rajeem (foaled 27 February 2003) is a British Thoroughbred racehorse and broodmare best known for her 50/1 upset win in the Falmouth Stakes. As a two-year-old she showed little early promise but improved towards the end of the season to win her last two races including the Listed Montrose Stakes. In the following year she was unplaced in her first four races but then defeated a top-class field to win the Falmouth Stakes. She never raced again owing to injuries and was retired in 2007. She has made little impact as a dam of winners.

== Background ==
Rajeem is a bay mare with a faint white star bred in Monmouthshire, Wales by the Usk Valley Stud. She was sired by Diktat, a British sprinter from the Godolphin Arabian sire-line who won the Haydock Sprint Cup in 1999. Apart from Rajeem, his most notable offspring has been the outstanding sprinter Dream Ahead. Rajeem was bred on very similar lines to Dream Ahead, behind sired by Diktat out of a daughter of Cadeaux Genereux. Rajeem's dam, Magic Sister, showed little ability as a racehorse, finishing no better than third in her six races but was a full-sister to the Prix Morny winner Hoh Magic. She was a distant female-line descendant of the influential British broodmare Red Agnes.

In October 2004 the yearling filly was sent to the Tattersalls sale and was bought for 27,000 guineas by Sheikh Mohammed's Darley Stud. During her track career, Rajeem raced in the colours of Saeed Manana and was trained by Clive Brittain at his Carlburg stable in Newmarket, Suffolk.

== Racing career ==
=== 2005: two-year-old season ===
Rajeem showed no racing ability in her first two starts, finishing unplaced in maiden races at Windsor and Lingfield in July. She produced a better effort in a seven furlong maiden at Warwick Racecourse on 5 September when she finished fourth of the twelve runners behind the Geoff Wragg-trained Giving. Three weeks later Rajeem recorded her first success in a maiden over one mile at Nottingham Racecourse, taking the lead two furlongs from the finish and winning by two lengths at odds of 17/2. On 29 October Rajeem was stepped up in class for the Listed Montrose Stakes at Newmarket Racecourse. There she was ridden by Jamie Spencer and started a 25/1 outsider in a ten-runner field. Racing up the centre of the wide Newmarket straight, she took the lead from Bunood a furlong from the finish and won by half a length.

=== 2006: three-year-old season ===
Rajeem began her second season in the Masaka Stakes over one mile on the Polytrack surface at Kempton Park Racecourse April 1. In this race she finished eighth of the eleven runners after starting slowly and being hampered in the early stages. Later that month she was matched against male opposition in the Feilden Stakes over nine furlongs at Newmarket and finished fifth behind the colt Atlantic Waves. Rajeem was sent to Düsseldorf ten days later for the German 1000 Guineas but made little impact as she finished eighth of the fourteen runners. Clive Brittain later said that the filly came back from Germany "devastated", having lost 29kg in weight.

At Royal Ascot on 23 June Rajeem started a 150/1 outsider for the Group One Coronation Stakes but belied her odds as she ran on strongly in the straight to finish fifth of the fifteen runners behind Nannina. At Newmarket on 12 July Rajeem was matched against older fillies and mares in the Falmouth Stakes and started a 50/1 outsider in a seven-runner field. Soviet Song (winner of the race in the last two years) started favourite ahead of Nannina and Peeress with the other three runners being Nasheej (May Hill Stakes, third in the 1000 Guineas), Musicanna (Atalanta Stakes) and Cape Columbine. Rajeem was partnered by the Australian Kerrin McEvoy who had partnered her at Ascot. In a change of tactics, Rajeem led from the start and set a slow pace before holding off several challengers in the final furlong to win by three quarters of a length ahead of Nannina with Musicanna, Nasheej and Peeress close behind. After the race Brittain said "She was 50-1 and 'have a go Clive' trained her, so people will try and pull the race down, saying they didn't go fast enough, but she still has won. When I get a good one, I know what to do and how to plan things. I would take anybody on."

The filly was expected to run in either the Nassau Stakes or the Prix d'Astarte but suffered injury problems and missed the rest of the season. She remained in training as a four-year-old but was unable to recover full fitness. Her retirement was announced in September 2007. Clive Brittain commented "We decided she had already won a Group One and had done enough – she didn't need to prove anything else... At the end of last year I was hoping we were going to have a good season with her and she got over her first injury but then she got another niggle".

== Breeding record ==
At the end of her racing career, Rajeem was retired to become a broodmare for Darley Stud. To date (2016) she has produced at least six foals and one winner:

- Tashreef, a brown filly, foaled in 2008, sired by Bernardini. Unraced.
- Master Rajeem, dark bay or brown colt (later gelded), 2009, by Street Cry. Won four National Hunt races.
- Araajmh, filly, 2010, by Street Cry. Unplaced in only race.
- Medallero, bay colt, 2011, by Medaglia d'Oro. Unplaced in two races.
- Country Madam, bay filly, 2012, by Medaglia d'Oro. Unraced.
- unnamed bay gelding, 2013, by Raven's Pass

Rajeem was offered for sale at Keeneland in 2012 but failed to reach her reserve price of $195,000. In November 2015 at the Goffs sale she was bought for €26,000 by Tinnakill Bloodstock.

== Pedigree ==
Pedigree of Rajeem (GB), bay mare, 2003
| Sire Diktat (GB) 1995 | Warning (GB); 1985 | Known Fact | In Reality |
| Sire Diktat (GB) 1995 | Warning (GB); 1985 | Known Fact | Tamarett |
| Sire Diktat (GB) 1995 | Warning (GB); 1985 | Slightly Dangerous | Roberto |
| Sire Diktat (GB) 1995 | Warning (GB); 1985 | Slightly Dangerous | Where You Lead |
| Sire Diktat (GB) 1995 | Arvola (GB); 1990 | Sadler's Wells | Northern Dancer |
| Sire Diktat (GB) 1995 | Arvola (GB); 1990 | Sadler's Wells | Fairy Bridge |
| Sire Diktat (GB) 1995 | Arvola (GB); 1990 | Park Appeal | Ahonoora |
| Sire Diktat (GB) 1995 | Arvola (GB); 1990 | Park Appeal | Balidaress |
| Dam Magic Sister (GB) 1997 | Cadeaux Genereux (GB); 1985 | Young Generation | Balidar |
| Dam Magic Sister (GB) 1997 | Cadeaux Genereux (GB); 1985 | Young Generation | Brig O'Doon |
| Dam Magic Sister (GB) 1997 | Cadeaux Genereux (GB); 1985 | Smarten Up | Sharpen Up |
| Dam Magic Sister (GB) 1997 | Cadeaux Genereux (GB); 1985 | Smarten Up | Languissola |
| Dam Magic Sister (GB) 1997 | Gunner's Belle (GB); 1980 | Gunner B | Royal Gunner |
| Dam Magic Sister (GB) 1997 | Gunner's Belle (GB); 1980 | Gunner B | Sweet Councillor |
| Dam Magic Sister (GB) 1997 | Gunner's Belle (GB); 1980 | Crimson Belle | Red God |
| Dam Magic Sister (GB) 1997 | Gunner's Belle (GB); 1980 | Crimson Belle | Signal Belle (Family: 16-c) |
