= Alydaress =

American-bred Thoroughbred racehorse

- Sire: Alydar
- Grandsire: Raise a Native
- Dam: Balidaress
- Damsire: Balidar
- Sex: Mare
- Foaled: 1 April 1986
- Country: United States
- Colour: Grey
- Breeder: Kinderhill Corporation & Darley Stud
- Owner: Sheikh Mohammed
- Trainer: Henry Cecil
- Record: 6: 3-2-1

Major wins
- Ribblesdale Stakes (1989); Irish Oaks (1989)

Alydaress (1 April 1986 – after 2000) was an American-bred, British-trained Thoroughbred racehorse and broodmare. In a racing career which lasted for a little over six months from April to October 1989 she won three of her six races. After finishing third on her debut she won a maiden race and then defeated top-class fields to take the Ribblesdale Stakes and Irish Oaks. In her two subsequent races she finished second in the Yorkshire Oaks and the Gran Premio del Jockey Club. She was retired from racing at the end of the year and had some success as a broodmare.

== Background ==
Alidaress was a grey mare bred in Kentucky by Kinderhill Corporation and Sheikh Mohammed's Darley Stud. As a yearling in July 1987 she was auctioned at the Keeneland select sale and bought for $650,000 by the Curragh Bloodstock Agency. She entered the sole ownership of Sheikh Mohammed and was sent to Europe where she was trained throughout her racing career by Henry Cecil at his Warren Place stable in Newmarket, Suffolk.

She was sired by the American stallion Alydar who was best known as a racehorse for his rivalry with the Triple Crown winner Affirmed. He later became a very successful breeding stallion whose other offspring included Easy Goer, Alysheba, Turkoman, Strike the Gold, Criminal Type and Miss Oceana. Alydaress's dam Balidaress (from whom she inherited her grey colour) was a moderate racehorse, winning three minor races, but proved a very successful broodmare: her other foals included Desirable (who won the Cheveley Park Stakes and was the dam of Shadayid), Park Appeal, and Balistroika, the dam of Russian Rhythm.

== Racing career ==
=== 1989: three-year-old season ===
Alydaress made her racecourse debut in a seven furlong maiden race at Newmarket Racecourse on 19 April. Ridden by Steve Cauthen she started at odds of 9/1 ina fifteen runner field and finished third behind Pilot and Kerita, beaten four lengths by the winner. On 11 May the filly was stepped up in distance for a maiden over ten furlongs at Sandown Racecourse and started 6/4 favourite against sixteen opponents. After turning into the straight in fourth place she took the lead inside the final furlong and won by a length from Tafila.

In June Alydaress was moved up sharply in class to contest the Group 2 Ribblesdale Stakes over one and a half miles at Royal Ascot and started the 4/1 fourth choice in a six-runner field. The undefeated Nearctic Flame started favourite ahead of Roseate Tern (third behind Aliysa and Snow Bride in The Oaks) and Shayraz, while the other two runners were Braiswick (Cheshire Oaks) and the Irish outsider Boldabsa. With Cauthen in the saddle, Alydaress was settled towards the rear of the field as Boldabsa set the pace from Nearctic Flame, but made a forward move early in the straight. She took the lead a furlong out and quickly went clear of her rivals to win by two and a half lengths from Roseate Tern, with the favourite a further length and a half back in third.

Alydaress was then matched against the Epsom Oaks winner Aliysa in the Irish Oaks at the Curragh on 15 July. Aliysa was made the 4/7 favourite while Alydaress, ridden for the first and only time by Mick Kinane started at odds of 7/4. The other three runners were Petite Ile, the winner of the Listed Oaks Trial at Phoenix Park Racecourse and the long-priced outsiders Royal Climber and Caerless Writing. The pace was set by Caerless Writing from Aliysa with Kinane tracking the favourite in third. The favourite went to the front entering the straight but Alydaress took the lead approaching the final furlong and held off a rally from Aliysa to win by three quarters of a length with Petite Ile a head away in third. Aliysa was later disqualified from the Epsom Oaks after testing positive for a banned substance (camphor): her second place at the Curragh was not affected.

In August Alydaress started odds-on favourite for the Yorkshire Oaks but was beaten one and a half lengths by Roseate Tern with Petite Ile in third place. After a break of over two months the filly returned to the track when she was sent to Italy and matched against older horses and male opposition in the Group 1 Gran Premio del Jockey Club over 2400 metres at San Siro Racecourse in Milan. She finished second, beaten half a length by the four-year-old colt Assatis, with Yellow King (Gran Premio d'Italia) in third.

== Breeding record ==
At the end of her racing career, Alydaress became a broodmare for her owner's stud. She produced at least six foals and four winners between 1992 and 2000:

- Bakers Gate, a dark bay or brown colt, foaled in 1992, sired by Danzig. Failed to win in five races.
- Allurement, bay filly, 1994, by Sadler's Wells. Won two races including Prix Cléopâtre.
- Laiyl, grey filly, 1996, by Nureyev. Won one race: dam of Layman (Prix de Cabourg, Sovereign Stakes).
- Amellnaa, bay filly, 1997, by Sadler's Wells. Won one race.
- Appreciation, brown filly, 1998, by Caerleon. Failed to win in eight races.
- Blue Dress, grey filly, 2000, by Danzig. Won one race.

== Pedigree ==
Pedigree of Alydaress (USA), grey mare, 1986
Sire Alydar (USA) 1975	Raise a Native (USA); 1961	Native Dancer	Polynesian
Sire Alydar (USA) 1975	Raise a Native (USA); 1961	Native Dancer	Geisha
Sire Alydar (USA) 1975	Raise a Native (USA); 1961	Raise You	Case Ace
Sire Alydar (USA) 1975	Raise a Native (USA); 1961	Raise You	Lady Glory
Sire Alydar (USA) 1975	Sweet Tooth (USA); 1965	On-and-On	Nasrullah
Sire Alydar (USA) 1975	Sweet Tooth (USA); 1965	On-and-On	Two Lea
Sire Alydar (USA) 1975	Sweet Tooth (USA); 1965	Plum Cake	Ponder
Sire Alydar (USA) 1975	Sweet Tooth (USA); 1965	Plum Cake	Real Delight
Dam Balidaress (IRE) 1973	Balidar (GB); 1966	Will Somers	Tudor Minstrel
Dam Balidaress (IRE) 1973	Balidar (GB); 1966	Will Somers	Queen's Jest
Dam Balidaress (IRE) 1973	Balidar (GB); 1966	Violet Bank	The Phoenix
Dam Balidaress (IRE) 1973	Balidar (GB); 1966	Violet Bank	Leinster
Dam Balidaress (IRE) 1973	Innocence (GB); 1968	Sea Hawk	Herbager
Dam Balidaress (IRE) 1973	Innocence (GB); 1968	Sea Hawk	Sea Nymph
Dam Balidaress (IRE) 1973	Innocence (GB); 1968	Novitiate	Fair Trial
Dam Balidaress (IRE) 1973	Innocence (GB); 1968	Novitiate	The Veil (Family: 14-c)
