= Glass Slippers (horse) =

British Thoroughbred racehorse

- Racing silks of Bearstone Stud
- Sire: Dream Ahead
- Grandsire: Diktat
- Dam: Night Gypsy
- Damsire: Mind Games
- Sex: Filly
- Foaled: 25 March 2016
- Country: United Kingdom
- Colour: Bay
- Breeder: Bearstone Stud
- Owner: Bearstone Stud
- Trainer: Kevin Ryan
- Record: 17: 7-3-1
- Earnings: £858,205

Major wins
- Prix Moonlight Cloud (2019); Prix du Petit Couvert (2019); Prix de l'Abbaye (2019); Flying Five Stakes (2020); Breeders' Cup Turf Sprint (2020)

Awards
- Yorkshire Horse of the Year (2020)

Glass Slippers (foaled 25 March 2016) is a British Thoroughbred racehorse best known for her performances over sprint distances. As a two-year-old in 2018 she showed promising form as she won two minor races from five starts. In the following year she was beaten in four races in Britain but the showed top class form over sprint distances when she was campaigned in France later in the year. She won the Prix Moonlight Cloud and the Prix du Petit Couvert before recording her first Group 1 victory in the Prix de l'Abbaye de Longchamp. She continued to race at the highest level in 2020, adding another Group 1 win in the Flying Five Stakes and going on to take her biggest victory in the Breeders' Cup Turf Sprint.

== Background ==
Glass Slippers is a bay filly with a large, diamond-shaped white star bred and owned by Terry Holdcroft's Shropshire-based Bearstone Stud. She was sent into training with Kevin Ryan at Hambleton in North Yorkshire. The filly has been ridden in most of her races by Tom Eaves.

She was from the fourth crop of foals sired by Dream Ahead, an outstanding sprinter from the Godolphin Arabian sire-line whose wins included the Prix Morny, Middle Park Stakes, July Cup, Haydock Sprint Cup and Prix de la Forêt. As a breeding stallion, his other progeny have included Donjuan Triumphant (British Champions Sprint Stakes) and Al Wukair (Prix Jacques Le Marois). Glass Slippers' dam Night Gypsy showed modest racing ability, winning one minor race from four attempts. She was descended from the British broodmare Shellshock who was a half-sister to Dibidale and to the dam of Tony Bin

== Racing career ==
=== 2018: two-year-old season ===
On 7 June Glass Slippers made her debut in a five furlong maiden race at Haydock Park for which she started a 50/1 outsider and finished third to Angel's Hideaway, beaten four and a quarter lengths by the winner. Franny Norton took the ride when the filly ran sixth in a similar event over six furlongs at Goodwood Racecourse on 1 August after being repeatedly denied a clear run. Two weeks later she went off the 5/4 favourite for a minor race at Beverley Racecourse and recorded her first success as she took the lead a furlong from the finish and came home two lengths clear of her rivals. On 1 September Glass Slippers started at 3/1 for a more competitive race over six furlongs at Chester Racecourse and won "a shade comfortably" by a neck from Light My Fire after going to the front in the last 75 yards. Three weeks later the filly was stepped up in class for the Group 3 Firth of Clyde Stakes on heavy ground at Ayr Racecourse and finished sixth to Queen of Bermuda after tiring in the closing stages.

=== 2019: three-year-old season ===
Glass Slippers made no impact on her first appearance of 2019 as she trailed home fifteenth of the sixteen runners behind Dandhu in the Fred Darling Stakes at Newbury on 13 April after losing both of her front shoes in the race. In the Listed Cecil Frail Stakes at Haydock in May she was matched against older fillies and mares and produced a better effort as she came home fifth behind Forever In Dreams, beaten just over two lengths by the winner. On 22 June she dropped back to five furlongs for the Listed Land O'Burns Fillies' Stakes at Ayr and was beaten a neck by the five-year-old mare Rebecca Rocks in a race which saw the first two finishers racing on opposite sides of the course. At York Racecourse on 12 July she finished fourth to Royal Intervention in the Group 3 Summer Stakes.

After four consecutive defeats in Britain, Glass Slippers was sent to France to contest the Listed Prix Moonlight Cloud over 1200 metres at Deauville Racecourse on 4 August and started a 10/1 outsider in an eight-runner field. She was in contention from the start, went to the front 300 metres from the finish and held off a challenge from Bravo Sierra to win by a neck, despite being forced to the right by the runner-up in the closing stages. On 15 September the filly returned to France for the Group 3 Prix du Petit Couvert over 1000 metres at Longchamp Racecourse and went off at odds of 14.9/1 in a twelve-runner field headed by the Prix de Saint-Georges winner Sestilio Jet. Glass Slippers started slowly and looked outpaced in the early stages before beginning to make headway in the last 300 metres and overtook Shades of Blue (another British-trained three-year-old filly) in the final strides to win by a short neck.

Glass Slippers started at odds of 12.8/1 when she was stepped up to Group 1 for the Prix de l'Abbaye over 1000 metres at Longchamp on 6 October. Battaash was made the odds-on favourite while the other fourteen runners included Fairyland, Mabs Cross, Shades of Blue, Sestilio Jet, Spinning Memories (Prix de Meautry), Soldier's Call (Flying Childers Stakes), Invincible Army (Duke of York Stakes) So Perfect (Lacken Stakes) and Finsbury Square (Prix du Gros Chêne). Glass Slippers took the lead after 300 metres and was never headed, drawing away from her rivals in the closing stages to come home three lengths clear of So Perfect. After the race Tom Eaves said "We were a bit concerned about the ground, but she jumped really well, travelled through the race well and I knew she'd stay. The team at home have kept her in tip-top shape all year, which is hard with fillies, and all she's done is improve."

=== 2020: four-year-old season ===
The flat racing season in Britain and Ireland was restructured as a result of the COVID-19 outbreak and Glass Slippers made her first appearance of the year in the King's Stand Stakes which was run behind closed doors at Royal Ascot on 16 June. Starting the third choice in the betting she tracked the leaders but was unable to make any significant progress in the last quarter mile and came home fifth of the eleven runners behind Battaash. In the King George Stakes at Goodwood she overcame a poor start to move into second place approaching the final furlong but never looked likely to threaten the leader Baattaash and was beaten two and a quarter lengths. On 13 September the filly was sent to Ireland for the Group 1 Flying Five Stakes at the Curragh in which she started the 9/2 second favourite behind A'Ali (Prix Robert Papin) in a fourteen-runner field which also included Que Amoro (runner-up in the Nunthorpe Stakes), Equilateral (Scarbrough Stakes), Liberty Beach (Molecomb Stakes), Keep Busy (Prix Yacowlef), Alligator Alley (Roses Stakes) and Maid In India (World Trophy). After settling in fifth place, Glass Slippers moved up into second place approaching the final furlong, took the lead from Keep Busy in the last 100 yards and "kept on well" to win by half a length. Tom Eaves said "She has been extremely good to me... She takes a while to warm into her season and comes good at this time of year. She's an amazing filly. You could do anything with her. She's so relaxed, has a great mind and is so tough. They went a good pace but Kevin filled me with loads of confidence and I knew she'd come home good."

On 4 October Glass Slippers returned to Longchamp and started the 1.7/1 favourite when she attempted to repeat her 2019 success in the Prix de l'Abbaye. She settled in second place behind Air De Valse before taking the lead 400 metres from the finish but was soon headed by the three-year-old Wooded. She rallied strongly in the closing stages but was unable to regain the advantage and was beaten a neck into second place. For her final run of the year, the filly was sent to the United States to contest the Breeders' Cup Turf Sprint (a race which had never been won by a European-trained horse) over five and a half furlongs at Keeneland on 7 November. She started the 8/1 sixth choice in the betting behind Leinster (Woodford Stakes), Imprimis (Shakertown Stakes), Big Runnuer (Eddie D Stakes), Got Stormy (Fourstardave Handicap) and Oleksandra (Jaipur Stakes). Glass Slippers raced towards the rear before moving up along the inside rail on the final turn and then "squeezed through" a narrow gap between her opponents (hampering Imprimis as she did so) to take the lead in the last 100 yards and win by half a length from Wet Your Whistle. After the race Kevin Ryan said "She's a filly that improves as the season goes on. When she won in Ireland, we sort of then planned to come here to give her the time... We decided on going on a brave ride up the inner and go the shortest route, and if it didn't work, such is life. Today was our day... She's got a great temperament and she doesn't worry about things. So when she does travel, she straight away she gets into her water, she gets on her food, and you have no worries that way... if everything goes right, we would love to come back."

In February 2021 Glass Slippers was named Yorkshire Horse of the Year for 2020.

== Pedigree ==
Pedigree of Glass Slippers (GB), bay filly, 2016
Sire Dream Ahead (USA) 2008	Diktat (GB); 1995	Warning	Known Fact (USA)
Sire Dream Ahead (USA) 2008	Diktat (GB); 1995	Warning	Slightly Dangerous (USA)
Sire Dream Ahead (USA) 2008	Diktat (GB); 1995	Arvola	Sadler's Wells (USA)
Sire Dream Ahead (USA) 2008	Diktat (GB); 1995	Arvola	Park Appeal (IRE)
Sire Dream Ahead (USA) 2008	Land of Dreams (GB); 1995	Cadeaux Genereux	Young Generation (IRE)
Sire Dream Ahead (USA) 2008	Land of Dreams (GB); 1995	Cadeaux Genereux	Smarten Up
Sire Dream Ahead (USA) 2008	Land of Dreams (GB); 1995	Sahara Star	Green Desert (USA)
Sire Dream Ahead (USA) 2008	Land of Dreams (GB); 1995	Sahara Star	Vaigly Star
Dam Night Gypsy (GB) 1998	Mind Games (GB); 1992	Puissance	Thatching (IRE)
Dam Night Gypsy (GB) 1998	Mind Games (GB); 1992	Puissance	Girton (IRE)
Dam Night Gypsy (GB) 1998	Mind Games (GB); 1992	Aryaf (CAN)	Vice Regent
Dam Night Gypsy (GB) 1998	Mind Games (GB); 1992	Aryaf (CAN)	Fashion Front (GB)
Dam Night Gypsy (GB) 1998	Ocean Grove (IRE); 1993	Fairy King (horse) (USA)	Northern Dancer (CAN)
Dam Night Gypsy (GB) 1998	Ocean Grove (IRE); 1993	Fairy King (horse) (USA)	Fairy Bridge
Dam Night Gypsy (GB) 1998	Ocean Grove (IRE); 1993	Leyete Gulf	Slip Anchor (GB)
Dam Night Gypsy (GB) 1998	Ocean Grove (IRE); 1993	Leyete Gulf	Shellshock (GB) (Family: 19-b)
