= Dream Ahead =

American-bred Thoroughbred racehorse

- Racing colours of Khalifa Dasmal
- Sire: Diktat
- Grandsire: Warning
- Dam: Land of Dreams
- Damsire: Cadeaux Genereux
- Sex: Stallion
- Foaled: 20 February 2008
- Country: United States
- Colour: Bay
- Breeder: Darley Stud
- Owner: Khalifa Dasmal
- Trainer: David Simcock
- Record: 9:6-0-0
- Earnings: £810,186

Major wins
- Prix Morny (2010); Middle Park Stakes (2010); July Cup (2011); Haydock Sprint Cup (2011); Prix de la Forêt (2011)

Awards
- Top-rated two-year-old in Europe (2010); European Champion Sprinter (2011)

Dream Ahead (foaled 20 February 2008) is a retired thoroughbred racehorse, who was bred in Kentucky and based in England during a nine race career which lasted from July 2010 to October 2011. As a two-year-old he was officially rated the equal of Frankel after winning the Prix Morny and the Middle Park Stakes. As a three-year-old he was successfully campaigned at sprint distances, winning the July Cup at Newmarket and defeating Goldikova in the Prix de la Forêt. He was named Europe's Champion Sprinter at the 2011 Cartier Racing Awards.

== Background ==
Dream Ahead, a bay colt with a narrow white blaze and three white socks, was bred in Kentucky by the Darley Stud. He was sired by Diktat, a British sprinter from the Godolphin Arabian sire-line who won the Haydock Sprint Cup in 1999. Apart from Dream Ahead, his most notable offspring has been the Falmouth Stakes winner Rajeem. Dream Ahead's dam, Land of Dreams, was another successful British sprinter who won the Flying Childers Stakes in 1997 and the King George Stakes in 1998. Dream Ahead was offered for sale as a yearling at Keeneland in September 2009, and was bought for $11,000 by the bloodstock agent Federico Barberini. Dream Ahead was then purchased for Khalifa Dasmal by Mark Crossman for £36,000 in April 2010 and sent into training with David Simcock in Newmarket, Suffolk.

== Racing career ==
=== 2010: two-year-old season ===
Dream Ahead made his first racecourse appearance at Nottingham in July 2010, in which he was ridden by William Buick, who would become his regular jockey. Running in a six furlong maiden race he took the lead a furlong from the finish and pulled clear despite hanging to the left in the closing stages and won by nine lengths. Five weeks later, Dream Ahead was moved into the highest class when he contested the Group One Prix Morny at Deauville. Starting at odds of 8/1 he took the lead inside the final furlong and won "comfortably", although he again drifted from a straight course towards the finish.

Dream Ahead returned to England for his next race, the Group One Middle Park Stakes at Newmarket, for which he started 5/4 favourite. Buick restrained the colt in the early stages before moving him forward to take the lead a furlong from the finish. In the closing stages he drew clear of the opposition whilst again hanging to the left, winning by nine lengths from the second favourite Strong Suit. Two weeks after his win in the Middle Park Stakes, Dream Ahead returned to Newmarket for the seven furlong Dewhurst Stakes in which he was pitted against the undefeated Frankel. The race between the two colts was highly anticipated and expected to be "one of the great two-year-old races of our time". Dream Ahead was held up towards the rear of the field before being switched to the outside two furlongs from the finish. He was soon seen to be struggling and made no impression, finishing fifth of the six runners behind Frankel.

=== 2011: three-year-old season ===
Dream Ahead failed to appear in the early part of 2011, with connections explaining that the colt was unsuited by the prevailing firm ground. He made his first appearance of the year at Royal Ascot in the St James's Palace Stakes. The field included Frankel, who had gone on to win the 2000 Guineas and started the odds-on favourite. Dream Ahead was never in serious contention and finished fifth of the nine runners, having been eased by Buick in the closing stages. On 9 July, Dream Ahead was brought back in distance for the six furlong July Cup at Newmarket. With Buick unavailable, Dream Ahead was ridden by Hayley Turner, who was attempting to become the first woman to ride the outright winner of a British Group One flat race. Turner positioned the colt just behind the leaders, but had difficulty obtaining a clear run a furlong from the finish. In the closing stages, Dream Ahead belatedly found a clear run and finished strongly to catch Bated Breath inside the furlong and won "readily" by half a length. Dream Ahead started favourite for the Prix Maurice de Gheest at Deauville four weeks later, but made no impression in the closing stages and finished unplaced behind Moonlight Cloud.

In September, Dream Ahead started 4/1 favourite for the Sprint Cup at Haydock Park Racecourse. He raced prominently before Buick sent him into the lead two furlongs from the finish. In a "thrilling" three-way finish he prevailed by a nose from Bated Breath with Hoof It a short head back in third. On his final start Dream Ahead contested the Prix de la Forêt at Longchamp, in which he was matched against Goldikova. The French mare started the 4/7 favourite with Dream Ahead being made the 7/2 second choice in the betting. Dream Ahead tracked Goldikova before moving up to take the lead 200m from the finish and the two favourites quickly drew several lengths clear of the opposition. Dream Ahead ran on strongly under pressure to beat Goldikova by a head.

Following his win over Goldikova, Dream Ahead was retired to stand at the Ballylinch Stud.

== Stud career ==
=== Notable progeny ===
c = colt, f = filly, g = gelding

| Foaled | Name | Sex | Major wins |
| 2013 | Donjuan Triumphant | c | British Champions Sprint Stakes |
| 2014 | Al Wukair | c | Prix Jacques Le Marois |
| 2014 | Dream of Dreams | g | Sprint Cup, Diamond Jubilee Stakes |
| 2016 | Glass Slippers | f | Prix de l'Abbaye de Longchamp, Flying Five Stakes, Breeders' Cup Turf Sprint |

== Assessment ==
At the end of the 2010 season, Dream Ahead was rated on 126, alongside Frankel, making him the equal-best two-year-old in Europe.

In the 2011 World Thoroughbred Racehorse Rankings, Dream Ahead was rated the seventh best racehorse in the world with a rating of 126.

Dream Ahead was named Europe's Champion Sprinter at the Cartier Racing Awards.

== Pedigree ==
Pedigree of Dream Ahead (USA), bay horse, 2008
| Sire Diktat (GB) 1995 | Warning; 1985 | Known Fact | In Reality |
| Sire Diktat (GB) 1995 | Warning; 1985 | Known Fact | Tamarett |
| Sire Diktat (GB) 1995 | Warning; 1985 | Slightly Dangerous | Roberto |
| Sire Diktat (GB) 1995 | Warning; 1985 | Slightly Dangerous | Where You Lead |
| Sire Diktat (GB) 1995 | Arvola; 1990 | Sadler's Wells | Northern Dancer |
| Sire Diktat (GB) 1995 | Arvola; 1990 | Sadler's Wells | Fairy Bridge |
| Sire Diktat (GB) 1995 | Arvola; 1990 | Park Appeal | Ahonoora |
| Sire Diktat (GB) 1995 | Arvola; 1990 | Park Appeal | Balidaress |
| Dam Land of Dreams (USA) 1995 | Cadeaux Genereux; 1985 | Young Generation | Balidar |
| Dam Land of Dreams (USA) 1995 | Cadeaux Genereux; 1985 | Young Generation | Brig O'Doon |
| Dam Land of Dreams (USA) 1995 | Cadeaux Genereux; 1985 | Smarten Up | Sharpen Up |
| Dam Land of Dreams (USA) 1995 | Cadeaux Genereux; 1985 | Smarten Up | Languissola |
| Dam Land of Dreams (USA) 1995 | Sahara Star; 1989 | Green Desert | Danzig |
| Dam Land of Dreams (USA) 1995 | Sahara Star; 1989 | Green Desert | Foreign Courier |
| Dam Land of Dreams (USA) 1995 | Sahara Star; 1989 | Vaigly Star | Star Appeal |
| Dam Land of Dreams (USA) 1995 | Sahara Star; 1989 | Vaigly Star | Dervaig (Family: 1-b) |
