= Montrose Stakes =

Flat horse race in Britain

Montrose Fillies' Stakes
2026
Haldon Pier	So Lovely	Trapped Goddess

Previous years
2025
Pintara	Sacred Ground	Previous
2024
Smoken	Secret Of Love	Tundra Rose
2023
Regal Jubilee	Je Zous	Molten Rock
2022
Caernarfon	Keep In Touch	Dream Of Love
2021
Kawida	Flash Betty	With The Moonlight

2020-2011
2020
Zeyaadah	Mystery Angel	Coul Queen
2019
Born With Pride	Peaceful	Run Wild
2018
Blue Gardenia	Vivid Diamond	Mistress Of Love
2017
Hadith	Baroness	Herecomesthesun
2016
Really Special	Kazimiera	Island Vision
2015
Fireglow	Rioca	Haggle
2014
Irish Rookie	Lady Of Dubai	Kodiva
2013
Majeyda	Adhwaa	Island Remede
2012
Pure Excellence	Desert Image	Power of Light
2011
Coquet	Abishena	Esentepe

2010-2001
2010
Blue Bunting	Elas Diamond	Whisper Louise
2009
Timepiece	Nurture	Clarietta
2008
Enticement	Super Sleuth	Splashdown
2007
Classic Legend	Jazz Jam	Queen Of Naples
2006
Passage of Time	Sues Surprise	Laurentina
2005
Rajeem	Bunood	Jaish
2004
Squaw Dance	Something Exciting	Borthwick Girl
2003
Spotlight	St Francis Wood	Ouija Board
2002
Hanami	Avoidance	Surval
2001
Sundrenched	Spinnette	Atarama

2000-1999
2000
La Vita E Bella	Esyoueffcee	Blushing Bride
1999
Silver Colours	Bedara	Moselle

The Montrose Stakes is a Listed flat horse race in Great Britain open to fillies aged two years only. It is run at Newmarket over a distance of 1 mile (1,609 metres), and it is scheduled to take place each year in late October or early November.

The race was first run in 1999.

== Winners ==
Year	Winner	Jockey	Trainer	Time
1999	Silver Colours	Dane O'Neill	Luca Cumani	1:47.54
2000	La Vita E Bella	Richard Mullen	Chris Wall	1:46.51
2001	Sundrenched	Michael Hills	William Haggas	1:42.65
2002	Hanami	Darryll Holland	James Toller	1:43.22
2003	Spotlight	Pat Eddery	John Dunlop	1:38.59
2004	Squaw Dance	Paul Hanagan	William Haggas	1:45.55
2005	Rajeem	Jamie Spencer	Clive Brittain	1:44.38
2006	Passage of Time	Richard Hughes	Henry Cecil	0:00.00
2007	Classic Legend	Ian Mongan	Brian Meehan	1:41.71
2008	Enticement	Jimmy Fortune	Michael Stoute	1:40.49
2009	Timepiece	Eddie Ahern	Henry Cecil	1:38.98
2010	Blue Bunting	Ahmed Ajtebi	Mahmood Al Zarooni	1:41.65
2011	Coquet	Robert Havlin	Hughie Morrison	1:38.05
2012	Pure Excellence	Joe Fanning	Mark Johnston	1:41.52
2013	Majeyda	Silvestre de Sousa	Charlie Appleby	1:42.30
2014	Irish Rookie	Fergus Sweeney	Martyn Meade	1:39.69
2015	Fireglow	Joe Fanning	Mark Johnston	1:40.58
2016	Really Special	Jim Crowley	Saeed bin Suroor	1:37.39
2017	Hadith	Adam Kirby	Charlie Appleby	1:38.73
2018	Blue Gardenia	Shane Gray	David O'Meara	1:42.32
2019	Born With Pride	Tom Marquand	William Haggas	1:43.29
2020	Zeyaadah	Jim Crowley	Roger Varian	1:46.85
2021	Kawida	Tom Marquand	Ed Walker	1:38.25
2022	Caernarfon	Connor Beasley	Mick Channon	1:42.00
2023	Royal Jubilee	Kieran Shoemark	John & Thady Gosden	1:43.84
2024	Smoken	Hector Crouch	Ralph Beckett	1:44.08
2025	Pintara	Hector Crouch	Ralph Beckett	1:38.09
2026	Haldon Pier	Rhys Clutterbuck	Ralph Beckett	1:40.91

== See also ==
- Horse racing in Great Britain
- List of British flat horse races
