= Desirable (horse) =

Irish-bred Thoroughbred racehorse

- Sire: Lord Gayle
- Grandsire: Sir Gaylord
- Dam: Balidaress
- Damsire: Balidar
- Sex: Mare
- Foaled: 29 March 1981
- Country: United Kingdom
- Colour: Grey
- Breeder: Mrs. W. Brannigan
- Owner: Catherine Corbett
- Trainer: Barry Hills
- Record: 11: 3-3-2

Major wins
- Princess Margaret Stakes (1983); Cheveley Park Stakes (1983)

Awards
- Timeform rating 115 (1983), 119 (1984)

Desirable (29 March 1981 – 1998) was a British thoroughbred racehorse and broodmare. As a two-year-old in 1983 she won on her debut and then took the Princess Margaret Stakes on her second appearance. After finishing second in the Lowther Stakes and the Moyglare Stud Stakes she recorded her biggest victory in the Cheveley Park Stakes. In the following year she failed to win but was placed in the 1000 Guineas and the Nassau Stakes as well as finishing fourth in the Coronation Stakes and the Irish Champion Stakes. After her retirement from racing she became a very successful broodmare, producing the 1000 Guineas winner Shadayid and several other good winners.

== Background ==
Desirable was a "lightly made", "rather narrow" grey mare bred in Ireland by Mrs. W. Brannigan. She was sired by Lord Gayle, an American-bred stallion who won the Prix Perth in 1970. Lord Gayle's other winning progeny included Carroll House, Blue Wind, Gay Lemur (Jockey Club Stakes) and the leading hurdler Pollardstown. Her dam Balidaress was an outstanding broodmare whose other descendants have included Park Appeal, Russian Rhythm and Cape Cross.

As a yearling, Desirable was offered for sale and was bought for 10,000 Irish guineas. During her racing career she competed in the blue and silver colours of the Gloucestershire-based Catherine Corbett and was trained at Lambourn in Berkshire by Barry Hills.

== Racing career ==
=== 1983: two-year-old season ===
Desirable made her racecourse debut in the twenty-eight runner Princess Maiden Stakes over six furlongs at Newmarket Racecourse in July. She accelerated clear of her rivals in the final furlong and recorded an impressive five length victory over the Ian Balding-trained Inspire. After the race a half-share in the filly was bought by Robert Sangster. Later that month she was moved up in class and made 4/6 favourite for the Princess Margaret Stakes over the same distance at Ascot Racecourse. Ridden by Lester Piggott she stayed on well in the closing stages to win by two lengths from Rocket Alert. In August she was stepped up again for the Group Two Lowther Stakes at York Racecourse in which Steve Cauthen rode the filly for the first time. She was beaten two and a half lengths into second place by the Henry Cecil-trained Prickle (ridden by Piggott), with the Cherry Hinton Stakes winner Chapel Cottage in third and Pebbles in fourth. Hills reportedly felt that the filly had been unsuited by the slow pace.

On 10 September, Desirable was sent to Ireland and started the 9/4 favourite for the Group One Moyglare Stud Stakes over six furlongs at the Curragh. With Cauthen again in the saddle she finished second of the twenty runners, beaten three quarters of a length by the locally trained Gala Event. Eighteen days later, she ended her season in the Cheveley Park Stakes (then the only British Group One race restricted to two-year-old fillies) over six furlongs at Newmarket and started at odds of 12/1 in a twelve-runner field. Prickle started favourite ahead of Gala Event, the French challenger Island Smile and the previously unbeaten Jameelapi, whilst the other contenders included Rocket Alert and Pebbles. Cauthen tracked the leader Prickle and moved up to challenge for the lead in the final furlong. The race produced a very close and exciting finish, with Desirable taking the lead in the final strides and winning by a neck and a short head from Pebbles and Prickle, with Gala Event, Malaak and Rocket Alert close behind.

=== 1984: three-year-old season ===
As a three-year-old, Desirable failed to win in six races but ran consistently well in defeat. On her racecourse debut she contested the classic 1000 Guineas over the Rowley Mile at Newmarket and finished third of the fifteen runners behind Pebbles and Meis-El-Reem. In the Irish 1000 Guineas at the Curragh she finished fifth of twenty-three behind Katies, beaten one and a half lengths by the winner and in the Coronation Stakes at Royal Ascot in June she took fourth place behind Katies, Pebbles and So Fine. In July she was moved up in distance to contest the Group Two Nassau Stakes at Goodwood Racecourse and finished second to Optimistic Lass. On her next appearance Desirable was matched against colts and older horses for the first time when she contested the inaugural Irish Champion Stakes (the most valuable race ever contested in Ireland up to that time) over ten furlongs at Phoenix Park Racecourse in September. She produced arguably the best performance of her career as she finished fourth behind Sadler's Wells, Seattle Song and Princess Pati. She ran poorly in her only subsequent start and was retired from racing at the end of the year.

In December 1984, Desirable was auctioned at Newmarket and bought for 1 million guineas by the Coolmore Stud.

== Assessment ==
In the International Classification for 1983, Desirable was given a rating of 75, making her the seventh-best two-year-old filly in Europe behind Almeira, Shoot Clear, Masarika, Satinette, Treizieme and Eastern Dawn. The independent Timeform organisation gave her a rating of 115, six pounds below their top juvenile filly Treizieme. In their annual Racehorses of 1983 Timeform described her as a "thoroughly dependable" filly who "most certainly won't be found wanting for courage". In 1984 Timeform rated her on 119, twelve pounds behind their top three-year-old filly Northern Trick.

== Breeding record ==
Desirable was retired from racing to become a broodmare. She was acquired by the Shadwell Stud and produced at least nine foals between 1988 and 1997:

- Shadayid, a grey filly, foaled in 1988, sired by Shadeed. Won five races including the Prix Marcel Boussac, Fred Darling Stakes and 1000 Guineas.
- Badie, grey colt, 1989, by Blushing Groom. Won two races.
- Jihaad, bay colt (later gelded), 1990, by Chief's Crown. Won two hurdle races.
- Dumaani, grey colt, 1991, by Danzig. Won seven races including the King Charles II Stakes, Keio Hai Spring Cup and Keeneland Breeders Cup Stakes.
- Azdihaar, brown filly, 1992, by Mr Prospector. Won two races.
- Shaddad, bay colt, 1994, by Shadeed. Failed to win in four races.
- Shaher, chestnut colt, 1995, by Shadeed. Failed to win in two races.
- Alattrah, grey filly, 1996, by Shadeed. Unraced.
- Fath, bay colt, 1997, by Danzig. Won four races including the Lennox Stakes.

Desirable died in 1998 while in foal to Nureyev.

== Pedigree ==
Pedigree of Desirable (IRE), grey mare, 1981
Sire Lord Gayle (USA) 1965	Sir Gaylord (USA); 1959	Turn-To	Royal Charger
Sire Lord Gayle (USA) 1965	Sir Gaylord (USA); 1959	Turn-To	Source Sucree
Sire Lord Gayle (USA) 1965	Sir Gaylord (USA); 1959	Somethingroyal	Princequillo
Sire Lord Gayle (USA) 1965	Sir Gaylord (USA); 1959	Somethingroyal	Imperatrice
Sire Lord Gayle (USA) 1965	Sticky Case (GB); 1958	Court Martial	Fair Trial
Sire Lord Gayle (USA) 1965	Sticky Case (GB); 1958	Court Martial	Instantaneous
Sire Lord Gayle (USA) 1965	Sticky Case (GB); 1958	Run Honey	Hyperion
Sire Lord Gayle (USA) 1965	Sticky Case (GB); 1958	Run Honey	Honey Buzzard
Dam Balidaress (IRE) 1973	Balidar (GB); 1966	Will Somers	Tudor Minstrel
Dam Balidaress (IRE) 1973	Balidar (GB); 1966	Will Somers	Queen's Jest
Dam Balidaress (IRE) 1973	Balidar (GB); 1966	Violet Bank	The Phoenix
Dam Balidaress (IRE) 1973	Balidar (GB); 1966	Violet Bank	Leinster
Dam Balidaress (IRE) 1973	Innocence (GB); 1968	Sea Hawk	Herbager
Dam Balidaress (IRE) 1973	Innocence (GB); 1968	Sea Hawk	Sea Nymph
Dam Balidaress (IRE) 1973	Innocence (GB); 1968	Novitiate	Fair Trial
Dam Balidaress (IRE) 1973	Innocence (GB); 1968	Novitiate	The Veil (Family:14-c)
