= Wentworth Stakes =

Flat horse race in Britain

- Class: Listed
- Location: Doncaster Racecourse; Doncaster, England
- Race type: Flat / Thoroughbred
- Sponsor: Virgin Bet
- Website: Doncaster

Race information
- Distance: 6f 2y (1,209 metres)
- Surface: Turf
- Track: Straight
- Qualification: Three-years-old and up exc G1 winners since 31 March
- Weight: 9 st 5 lb Allowances; 5 lb for fillies and mares Penalties; 7 lb for Group 2 winners * 5 lb for Group 3 winners * 3 lb for Listed winners * * since 31 March
- Purse: £60,000 (2025); 1st: £22,684

Wentworth Stakes
2026
Coul Angel	Poatan	Montassib

Previous years
2025
Spycatcher	Zoum Zoum	Magic Basma
2024
Room Service	Balmoral Lady	Thunderbear
2023
Tacarib Bay	Sense Of Duty	Albasheer
2022
Fast Response	Tarhib	Art Power
2021
King's Lynn	Magical Spirit	Rhythm Master

2020-2011
2020
Dakota Gold	Aberama Gold	Zim Baby
2018
Donjuan Triumphant	Hey Jonesy	Eirene
2017
Dream Of Dreams	Perfect Pasture	Danzeno
2016
Growl	Aeolus	Kimberella
2015
Jack Dexter	Lightning Moon	Lancelot Du Lac
2014
Aetna	Lancelot Du Lac	Spinatrix
2013
Jack Dexter	Highland Colori	Spinatrix
2012
Eton Rifles	Ultrasonic	Justineo
2011
Sirius Prospect	Mayson	Doc Hay

2010-2001
2010
Russian Spirit	Hitchens	Doncaster Rover
2009
Fullandby	Arthur's Edge	Lovely Thought
2008
Icelandic	Against The Grain	Chief Editor
2007
Galeota	Borderlescott	Knot In Wood
2006
Rising Shadow	Presto Shinko	Great Britain
2005
Presto Shinko	Tahrir	One Putra
2004
Quito	Millennium Force	Ruby Rocket
2003
Steenberg	Royal Millennium	Crimson Silk
2002
Tom Tun	Bright Edge	Goldeva
2001
Danehurst	Eastern Purple	Orientor

2000-1991
2000
Andreyev	Further Outlook	Gaelic Storm
1999
Pipalong	Two Clubs	Qilin
1998
Gorse	Yorkies Boy	Gaelic Storm
1997
Snow Kid	My Best Valentine	Tomba
1996
Astrac	Diffident	Russian Revival
1995
Carranita	Branston Abby	Royale Figurine
1994
Double Blue	Branston Abby	Great Deeds
1993
Blyton Lad	Branston Abby	Garah
1992
Blyton Lad	Keen Hunter	Garah
1991
Snaadee	Gilt Throne	Norton Challenger

1990-1988
1990
Katies First	Nicholas	The Auction Bidder
1989
Dawn Success	Blyton Lad	Bay Bay
1988
Moon Drop	Mac's Fighter	Dwell

The Wentworth Stakes is a Listed flat horse race in Great Britain open to horses aged three years or older. It is run at Doncaster over a distance of 6 furlongs and 2 yards (1,209 metres), and it is scheduled to take place each year in November.

Before 1995 the race was known as the Remembrance Day Stakes.

== Winners ==
Year	Winner	Age	Jockey	Trainer	Time
1976	Cry No More	3	Frankie Durr	Richard Hannon Sr.	1:19.97
1977	Swakara	4	Tony Ives	Reg Hollinshead	1:17.56
1978	Court Barns	3	Willie Carson	Harry Wragg	1:14.52
1979	Lightning Label	3	Greville Starkey	Paul Kelleway	1:17.50
1980	Lightning Label	4	Willie Carson	Paul Kelleway	1:20.14
1981	Great Eastern	4	Joe Mercer	John Dunlop	1:14.85
1982	Camisite	4	Tony Ives	Bill O'Gorman	1:18.16
1983	Vorvados	6	Greville Starkey	Mick Haynes	1:15.93
1984	Polly's Brother	6	Kevin Hodgson	Peter Easterby	1:19.44
1985	Grey Desire	5	Kevin Darley	Mel Brittain	1:18.54
1986	Butsova	3	Willie Carson	Robert Armstrong	1:17.93
1987	Sharp Reminder	3	Tyrone Williams	Ray Laing	1:15.92
1988	Moon Drop	3	Bruce Raymond	Ben Hanbury	1:12.88
1989 (Note: The 1989 running took place at Thirsk)	Dawn Success	3	Michael Roberts	Clive Brittain	1:14.00
1990	Katies First	3	Paul Eddery	Geoff Lewis	1:15.20
1991	Snaadee	4	Pat Eddery	Michael Stoute	1:14.13
1992	Blyton Lad	6	Stuart Webster	Maurice Camacho	1:13.89
1993	Blyton Lad	7	Stuart Webster	Maurice Camacho	1:13.12
1994	Double Blue	5	Jason Weaver	Mark Johnston	1:19.00
1995	Carranita	5	Tim Sprake	Bryn Palling	1:12.42
1996	Astrac	5	Kieren Fallon	Gay Kelleway	1:15.51
1997	Snow Kid	3	Jimmy Fortune	David Loder	1:19.26
1998	Gorse	3	John Reid	Henry Candy	1:15.70
1999	Pipalong	3	Lindsay Charnock	Tim Easterby	1:18.54
2000	Andreyev	6	Kevin Darley	Richard Hannon Sr.	1:18.45
2001	Danehurst	3	George Duffield	Sir Mark Prescott	1:17.34
2002	Tom Tun	7	Micky Fenton	James Given	1:19.50
2003	Steenberg	4	Philip Robinson	Mark Tompkins	1:14.03
2004	Quito	7	Tony Culhane	David Chapman	1:16.64
2005	Presto Shinko	4	Richard Hughes	Richard Hannon Sr.	1:20.77
2006 (Note: The 2006 edition was run at Windsor)	Rising Shadow	5	Franny Norton	David Barron	1:13.00
2007	Galeota	5	Ryan Moore	Richard Hannon Sr.	1:12.39
2008	Icelandic	6	Hayley Turner	Frank Sheridan	1:16.47
2009	Fullandby	7	Alan Munro	Tim Etherington	1:14.74
2010	Russian Spirit	4	Philip Robinson	Michael Jarvis	1:12.40
2011	Sirius Prospect	3	Shane Kelly	Dean Ivory	1:13.82
2012	Eton Rifles	7	William Carson	Stuart Williams	1:13.25
2013	Jack Dexter	4	Graham Lee	Jim Goldie	1:18.44
2014	Aetna	4	Graham Gibbons	Mick Easterby	1:19.12
2015	Jack Dexter	6	Danny Tudhope	Jim Goldie	1:19.36
2016	Growl	4	Graham Lee	Richard Fahey	1:11.61
2017	Dream of Dreams	3	Jim Crowley	Sir Michael Stoute	1:13.49
2018	Donjuan Triumphant	5	James Doyle	Andrew Balding	1:13.12
2019	Abandoned due to waterlogging
2020	Dakota Gold	6	Paul Mulrennan	Michael Dods	1:13.96
2021	King's Lynn	4	David Probert	Andrew Balding	1:15.40
2022	Fast Response	3	Clifford Lee	Karl Burke	1:17.11
2023	Tacarib Bay	4	Sean Levey	Richard Hannon Jr.	1:11.63
2024	Room Service	3	Tom Eaves	Kevin Ryan	1:15.07
2025	Spycatcher	7	Pierre-Louis Jamin	Karl Burke	1:17.06
2026	Coul Angel	4	Joanna Mason	Michael Appleby	1:13.04

== See also ==
- Horse racing in Great Britain
- List of British flat horse races
