= Hired armed cutter John Bull =

History

United Kingdom
- Name: John Bull
- Namesake: John Bull
- In service: May 1804
- Out of service: December 1806
- Fate: Returned to owner

United Kingdom
- Name: John Bull
- Captured: September 1809

France
- Name: John Bull
- Acquired: 1809 by capture
- Commissioned: August 1810
- Fate: Currently unknown

General characteristics
- Type: Cutter
- Tons burthen: 11936/94, or 120 (bm)
- Complement: 30 (privateer)
- Armament: Hired cutter:16 × 12-pounder carronades; British privateer:12 × 9&4-pounder guns; French privateer:10 × 12 or 18-pounder carronades

His Majesty's hired armed cutter John Bull served the British Royal Navy under contract between 5 May 1804 and 26 November 1806. She then became a privateer. She detained numerous vessels before she herself fell prey to a French privateer in 1809. She then became a French privateer. Her ultimate fate is currently unknown.

== Hired armed cutter ==
On 14 October 1804 John Bull delivered dispatches from Plymouth to Admiral Nelson in the Mediterranean. She left for Plymouth that same day. On 4 November John Bull arrived from Gibraltar with dispatches from off Toulon.

John Bull arrived at Port Royal, Jamaica, on 28 March 1805 after a 38-day voyage from Plymouth. She was carrying dispatches, and the news of the commencement of war with Spain, though the order that Spanish vessels be detained was already known.

On the way out John Bull had encountered Acasta, which a gale had caused to separate from the convoy that Acasta she was escorting to Jamaica. Acasta intended to search for the convoy for a day or two.

From Jamaica John Bull sailed on to Barbados where 10 vessels of the convoy had arrived before she left.

While on the Jamaica station, and prior to 1 June, John Bull, under the command of Lieutenant Kortwright, captured the French schooner Elizabeth, which was carrying a cargo of sundries.

In mid-September John Bull detained and sent into Plymouth two vessels: Palinurius, Merrehew, master, from New York, and Sirene, Horkendorf, master, from Bordeaux.

On 8 March 1806 John Bull, under the command of Lieutenant George Broad, captured the Spanish vessels Legero and Los Animos. On 2 May John Bull arrived with dispatches from Admiral Sir John Borlase Warren concerning the British victory at the action of 13 March 1806

Between 18 and 21 June, Admiral Warren and a squadron were off Madeira. John Bull, Moucheron, and Whiting arrived at Madeira on 18 June and they sailed from Madeira to join the squadron on 21 June.

== Privateer ==
On 9 December Captain Michael Till received a letter of marque for the cutter John Bull.

In mid-January 1807 the privateers John Bull and Busy detained Vrow Anna, a Dane, which had been sailing from Marennes to Gothenburg. A few days later John Bull detained and sent into Plymouth John Adams, which had been sailing from Alicante to Cochin.

In early February John Bull detained the American vessel Henrietta, Nichols, master, which had been sailing from Leghorn. A few weeks later John Bull detained and sent into Plymouth the Danish vessel Provistina Jacobsen, which had been sailing from Alicante.

The privateers John Bull and Indefatigable sent the Danish ship Little Catherine, Beorne, master, into Plymouth on 24 June. Little Catherine had left Bengal on 1 February and St Helena on 28 April. When she left St Helena she left there the frigate Sir Edward Hughes, eleven home-bound East Indiamen, four whalers, and a vessel returning from Botany Bay.

On 24 July John Bull sent into Dartmouth the Danish vessel Aurora, Pedersen, master, which had been sailing from Lisbon to Antwerp. A day or so later John Bull detained and sent into Plymouth General Walterstof, Groot, master. General Walterstorf had been sailing from Saint Croix to Copenhagen.

At the end of August John Bull detained Froe Secolitas, Sursen, master, which had come from Saint Thomas's. John Bull also detained Flask, Erickson, master, from Lisbon to Tonningen, and Neord, Tyson, master, from Oporto to Tonningen. John Bull sent all three into Plymouth.

At the beginning of October John Bull detained and sent into Plymouth, Indogheten, Johnson, master, coming from Cette.

On 10 October a small privateer captured Cornelius, Hussey, master, as Cornelius was sailing from Liverpool to Newfoundland. That same day John Bull recaptured Cornelius and sent her into Plymouth.

Early in January 1808 John Bull detained Johanna, Suraisson, master, and sent her into Plymouth. Johanna had been sailing from Archangel to Oporto.

On 17 August the Spanish schooner Diligente arrived at Plymouth. The privateer John Bull had detained her as Diligente was sailing from St Sebastian to St Andero.

Early in September 1809 the letter of marque cutter John Bull captured the Spanish vessel N.S. Aransia. She had been sailing from Cadiz to Seville and John Bull brought her into Plymouth.

== Fate ==
In September the French privateer Pourvoyeur, of Dieppe, captured the cutter John Bull and carried her into that port. (Note: Pourvoyeur was a lugger of 40 men and eight guns, from Dieppe, and commissioned in August 1809. She apparently was a captured privateer from Jersey. Pourvoyeur was under Antoine-Joseph Preira, who used "Balidar" as a nom de guerre. From 1811 she cruised again, captain unknown.) Apparently John Bull and Pourvoyeur exchanged fire, and then the French boarded John Bull and took her in hand-to-hand combat. The French reported having lost one man killed; British casualties were 14. (Note: The report, dated Dieppe, 14 September, gave the name of the owner of Pourvoyeur as M. Quenouille. It also described John Bull as being armed with ten 12 and 18-pounder carronades.)

On his 20-day cruise, Balidar, captain of Pourvoyeur, gathered four prizes, including John Bull, that he sold in Dieppe. The other three prizes were: Little Arthur, Exchange (of Wells), and Suckey. (Note: Little Arthur, Dawson, master, was going to Gibraltar when "a French privateer" captured her off the Scilly Isles. Exchange, Smith, master, was sailing from Oporto to London when a privateer captured her on 8 December and took her into Dieppe.) He grossed 447,862 francs.

John Bull was commissioned in August 1810 as a French privateer with ten 12 or 18-pounder carronades.
