= King Charles II Stakes =

Flat horse race in Britain

King Charles II Stakes
2026
Saber Strike	Cerro Blanco	Stellar Sunrise

Previous years
2025
Cosmic Year	Marvelman	Diego Ventura
2024
Boiling Point	Bold Style	Queen Of Zafeen
2023
Shouldvebeenaring	Benacre	Arabian Storm
2022
Noble Truth	Honey Sweet	Gubbass
2021
Bellosa	Fundamental	Bellissime

2020-2011
2020
Surf Dancer	Boccaccio	Lincoln Bright
2019
Jash	Azano	Watan
2018
Purser	Mutaaqeb	Aurum
2017
Taamol	Larchmont Lad	Seven Heavens
2016
Thikriyaat	Dragon Mall	Scrutineer
2015
Tupi	Latharnach	Markaz
2014
Coulsty	Toofi	Windfast
2013
Dundonnell	Music Master	Baltic Knight
2012
Aljamaaheer	The Nile	Balty Boys
2011
Codemaster	I Love Me	Masaya

2010-2001
2010
Field Of Dream	Red Jazz	Rodrigo De Torres
2009
Alyarf	Nasri	Courageous
2008
Calming Influence	Stimulation	Red Alert Day
2007
Tariq	Mr Napper Tandy	Prince Forever
2006
Jeremy	Wake Up Maggie	Spinning Queen
2005
Council Member	Museeb	Aragorn
2004
Fokine	Peak To Creek	Cartography
2003
Trade Fair	Membership	Mustaneer
2002
Millennium Dragon	Indian Country	Irony
2001
Malhub	Hurricane Floyd	Reel Buddy

2000-1991
2000
Shibboleth	Observatory	Free Rider
1999
Fragrant Oasis	Arctic Char	Undeterred
1998
Bold Fact	Daring Derek	Jila
1997
Andreyev	Royal Aty	Granny's Pet
1996
Ali-Royal	Rabican	World Premier
1995
Epagris	Warning Shadows	Karayb
1994
Dumaani	Satin Velvet	Rafferty's Rules
1993
Eurolink Thunder	Abbey's Gal	Humam
1992
King Olaf	Balla Jidaal	Fair Crack
1991
Balwa	Soleil Dancer	Panchos Pearl

1990-1988
1990
In Excess	Norwich	Hasbah
1989
Magical Strike	Samoan	Alcando
1988
Rawnak	Border Guard	Iran Scam

The King Charles II Stakes is a Listed flat horse race in Great Britain open to horses aged three years only. It is run at Newmarket over a distance of 7 furlongs (1,408 metres), and it is scheduled to take place each year in May during Newmarket's Guineas Festival. Prior to 2022 it was run at a meeting in mid-May.

== Records ==
Leading jockey (4 wins):

- Ray Cochrane – Half A Year (1987), Rawnak (1988), Magical Strike (1989), Eurolink Thunder (1993))

Leading trainer (4 wins):

- Sir Michael Stoute – Magical Strike (1989), Jeremy (2006), Thikriyaat (2016), Taamol (2017)

== Winners ==
Year	Winner	Jockey	Trainer	Time
1987	Half A Year	Ray Cochrane	Luca Cumani	1:24.84
1988	Rawnak	Ray Cochrane	Peter Walwyn	1:24.74
1989	Magical Strike	Ray Cochrane	Michael Stoute	1:26.11
1990	In Excess	Alan Munro	Bill O'Gorman	1:26.35
1991	Balwa	Jimmy Fortune	Alex Scott	1:25.66
1992	King Olaf	Lester Piggott	Peter Chapple-Hyam	1:26.02
1993	Eurolink Thunder	Ray Cochrane	John Dunlop	1:25.60
1994	Dumaani	Willie Carson	John Dunlop	1:25.30
1995	Epagris	Willie Ryan	Henry Cecil	1:24.98
1996	Ali-Royal	Willie Ryan	Henry Cecil	1:27.92
1997	Andreyev	Richard Hughes	Richard Hannon Sr.	1:28.44
1998	Bold Fact	Kieren Fallon	Henry Cecil	1:25.06
1999 (Note: The 1999 running took place on Newmarket's July Course)	Fragrant Oasis	Gary Carter	Ed Dunlop	1:25.66
2000	Shibboleth	Richard Quinn	Henry Cecil	1:24.08
2001	Malhub	Richard Hills	John Gosden	1:23.31
2002	Millennium Dragon	Frankie Dettori	Michael Jarvis	1:22.50
2003	Trade Fair	Frankie Dettori	Roger Charlton	1:27.09
2004	Fokine	Michael Hills	Barry Hills	1:24.58
2005	Council Member	Kerrin McEvoy	Saeed bin Suroor	1:24.91
2006	Jeremy	Robert Winston	Sir Michael Stoute	1:28.81
2007	Tariq	Jimmy Fortune	Peter Chapple-Hyam	1:25.66
2008	Calming Influence	Kerrin McEvoy	Saeed bin Suroor	1:26.01
2009	Alyarf	Michael Hills	Barry Hills	1:24.97
2010	Field Of Dream	J-P Guillambert	Luca Cumani	1:27.40
2011	Codemaster	Dane O'Neill	Henry Candy	1:22.18
2012	Aljamaaheer	Paul Hanagan	Roger Varian	1:24.66
2013	Dundonnell	Martin Harley	Roger Charlton	1:23.53
2014	Coulsty	Sean Levey	Richard Hannon Jr.	1:23.72
2015	Tupi	Cam Hardie	Richard Hannon Jr.	1:21.98
2016	Thikriyaat	Ted Durcan	Sir Michael Stoute	1:25.25
2017	Taamol	Jim Crowley	Sir Michael Stoute	1:26.68
2018	Purser	Robert Havlin	John Gosden	1:26.46
2019	Jash	Dane O'Neill	Simon Crisford	1:24.79
2020 (Note: The 2020 race was run at York in July due to the COVID-19 pandemic in the United Kingdom)	Surf Dancer	Ryan Moore	William Haggas	1:24.14
2021	Bellosa	Richard Kingscote	Jane Chapple-Hyam	1:26.85
2022	Noble Truth	William Buick	Charlie Appleby	1:26.50
2023	Shouldvebeenaring	Sean Levey	Richard Hannon Jr.	1:24.97
2024	Boiling Point	James Doyle	Roger Varian	1:25.17
2025	Cosmic Year	Ryan Moore	Harry Charlton	1:24.04
2026	Saber Strike	Tom Marquand	William Haggas	1:25.52

== See also ==
- Horse racing in Great Britain
- List of British flat horse races
