= Rockingham Stakes =

Flat horse race in Britain

Rockingham Stakes
2026
Cut A Dash	Agamemnon	Battle Fever

Previous years
2025
Division	Boston Dan	Comical Point
2024
Jungle Drums	It Ain't Two	Milford
2023
Purosangue	Esquire	Jehangeer
2022
Alpha Capture	Kyeema	Felix Natalis
2021
Canonized	Witch Hunter	Breeze Easy

2020-2011
2020
Nastase	Light Refrain	Internationaldream
2019
Aberama Gold	Ventura Lightning	Orlaith
2018
Vintage Brut	Dave Dexter	Cosmic Law
2017
Rebel Assault	It Dont Come Easy	Staxton
2016
Sir Dancealot	Dream Of Dreams	Perfect Angel
2015
Donjuan Triumphant	Dhahmaan	Gracious John
2014
Mattmu	Bond's Girl	Fanciful Angel
2013
Mushir	No Leaf Clover	Brave Boy
2012
Royal Rascal	Odooj	Lucky Beggar
2011
Bannock	Miss Lahar	Swiss Spirit

2010-2001
2010
Katla	Barefoot Lady	Carrignavar
2009
Layla's Hero	Coolminx	Never The Waiter
2007
Max One Two Three	Maze	Look Busy
2006
Baby Strange	Hinton Admiral	Final Dynasty
2005
Balthazaar's Gift	Masta Plasta	South Cape
2004
Moth Ball	Nufoos	Woodcote
2003
Peak To Creek	Mac Love	Blue Tomato
2002
Avonbridge	Cumbrian Venture	Judhoor
2001
Prism	Carinae	White Rabbit

2000-1991
2000
Atmospheric	Nearly A Fool	Healey
1999
Out of Africa	Bally Pride	Rudik
1998
Undeterred	Indiana Legend	Valentine Waltz
1996
Nightbird	Victory Dancer	Reliquary
1995
Resounder	Warning Time	Beautiful Ballad
1994
Sumoquinn	Painted Madam	Ginger Tree
1993
Palacegate Jack	Nightitude	Ehtfaal
1992
Rain Brother	Mithl Al Hawa	Brockton Dancer
1991
Misterioso	Prince Ferdinand	Master Of Passion

1990-1989
1990
Punch N'Run	Daki	Kalshandi
1989
Montendre	Daarik	Vax Lady

The Rockingham Stakes is a Listed flat horse race in Great Britain open to horses aged two years only. It is run at York over a distance of 6 furlongs (1,206 metres), and it is scheduled to take place each year in October.

== Winners ==
Year	Winner	Jockey	Trainer	Time
1986	Midyan	Willie Ryan	Henry Cecil	1:11.91
1987	Harp Islet	Ray Cochrane	Luca Cumani	1:17.00
1988	Court	Michael Roberts	Alec Stewart	1:10.04
1989	Montendre	Frankie Dettori	Luca Cumani	1:13.89
1990	Punch N'Run	Brian Rouse	Richard Hannon Sr.	1:11.27
1991	Misterioso	Mark Birch	David Elsworth	1:11.84
1992	Rain Brother	Darryll Holland	Peter Chapple-Hyam	1:16.39
1993	Palacegate Jack	John Carroll	Jack Berry	1:18.86
1994	Sumoquinn	Richard Hughes	Mick Channon	1:14.59
1995	Resounder	Frankie Dettori	John Gosden	1:12.89
1996	Nightbird	Michael Hills	Barry Hills	1:10.99
1997	Abandoned due to unsafe ground
1998	Undeterred	Gary Hind	Chris Wall	1:12.27
1999	Out of Africa	Ray Cochrane	Barry Hills	1:14.54
2000	Atmospheric	Fergus Sweeney	Paul Cole	1:19.76
2001	Prism (Note: The 2001 winner Prism was later exported to Hong Kong and renamed Floral King)	Alan Daly	Marcus Tregoning	1:13.99
2002	Avonbridge	Kieren Fallon	Roger Charlton	1:11.07
2003	Peak To Creek	Pat Eddery	Jeremy Noseda	1:11.33
2004	Moth Ball	Darryll Holland	Jamie Osborne	1:12.08
2005	Balthazaar's Gift	Neil Callan	Kevin Ryan	1:12.55
2006	Baby Strange	Tadgh O'Shea	Paul Blockley	1:14.87
2007	Max One Two Three	Richard Kingscote	Tom Dascombe	1:13.08
2008	Course closed for drainage work following abandonment of the Ebor meeing in August
2009	Layla's Hero	Eddie Ahern	David Nicholls	1:13.02
2010	Katla	Billy Lee	John Grogan	1:17.94
2011	Bannock	Silvestre De Sousa	Mark Johnston	1:11.57
2012	Royal Rascal	David Allan	Tim Easterby	1:15.93
2013	Mushir	Dane O'Neill	Roger Varian	1:12.92
2014	Mattmu	David Allan	Tim Easterby	1:14.43
2015	Donjuan Triumphant	Jack Garrity	Richard Fahey	1:13.73
2016	Sir Dancealot	Shane Kelly	David Elsworth	1:12.51
2017	Rebel Assault	Franny Norton	Mark Johnston	1:11.72
2018	Vintage Brut	David Allan	Tim Easterby	1:12.64
2019	Aberama Gold	Shane Gray	Keith Dalgleish	1:16.30
2020	Nastase	David Probert	Mick Channon	1:15.19
2021	Canonized	Tom Marquand	William Haggas	1:15.56
2022	Alpha Capture	Tom Marquand	William Haggas	1:13.48
2023	Purosangue	P. J. McDonald	Andrew Balding	1:15.95
2024	Jungle Drums	Sam James	Karl Burke	1:14.78
2025	Division	Tom Marquand	William Haggas	1:12.37
2026	Cut A Dash	Sean Levey	Richard Hannon Jr.	1:12.79

== See also ==
- Horse racing in Great Britain
- List of British flat horse races
