= Robert Havlin =

Scottish jockey

Personal information
- Occupation: Jockey

Horse racing career
- Sport: Horse racing

Major racing wins
- Major races: Fillies' Mile (2022); Lockinge Stakes (2024)
- Updated on 20 May 2024

Robert Havlin (born December 1973), usually known as Rab Havlin, is a Group 1-winning Scottish jockey, who predominantly rides for the John Gosden stable. His biggest victories to date have been the 2022 Fillies' Mile on Commissioning and the 2024 Lockinge Stakes on Audience, but he has also won at Royal Ascot - the 2016 Windsor Castle Stakes with Ardad and the 2021 Ribblesdale Stakes with Loving Dream.

== Career ==
Havlin grew up in Saltcoats, North Ayrshire. In his teens, in the evenings he worked for a local horse dealer, Alex Whyte and on Saturday mornings, his mother took him to the yard of John Wilson near Ayr Racecourse. After leaving school, Havlin joined the yard full time.

He started out as an apprentice at Manton Stables in Wiltshire, originally to Peter Chapple-Hyam, then to John Gosden. This started promisingly, with 32 winners in 1996, followed by 15 more in each of the two following seasons.

In June 2000, he won his first Listed race at Lingfield on Mount Abu for Gosden. It was another three years before he won another black type race (the 2003 Lancashire Oaks on Place Rouge, also for Gosden) and a further three before he added a third (the Aphrodite Stakes on Quenched, again for Gosden). Gosden was a paternal influence on Havlin and when the trainer moved to Newmarket, although he was unable to offer Havlin a job himself, he instructed him to get in touch if he himself moved there, which he did.

Havlin became pivotal in bringing forward some of Gosden's star horses. He rode work on Golden Horn and Kingman, a horse that in 2016 Havlin claimed was the best he had ridden.

He won the Italian Derby in 2012 on Feuerblitz for Michael Figge. That same season, he formed a strong partnership with Hughie Morrison's filly Coquet, winning two Listed races - the Montrose Stakes and the Height of Fashion Stakes.

In 2015, he had his best year to that date, riding 73 winners from more than 500 rides in the UK and adding the Oaks d'Italia to his previous Italian Derby win, riding Lovelyn for Peter Schiergen. On Gretchen, he won the Listed Chalice Stakes and Group 2 Park Hill Stakes and on Journey, he won two Listed races - the Upavon Fillies' Stakes and Princess Royal Stakes.

He rode his first Royal Ascot winner the following year on Gosden's Ardad in the Windsor Castle Stakes. Other Group wins were on California in the Lillie Langtry Stakes, Richard Pankhurst in the Group 2 Hungerford Stakes and Persuasive in the Atalanta Stakes, again all for Gosden.

In March 2017, he was banned for six months by France Galop after testing positive for five banned substances at Saint-Cloud the previous autumn. The ban was reciprocated by the British governing authority, the BHA. Havlin maintained his innocence and went through a series of appeals, at one of which Gosden spoke forcefully on his behalf. However, the ruling was not overturned and he had to wait out the end of his suspension in October. His seasonal win total of 27 that year was his lowest since 2004 and he estimated that the affair had cost him a six figure sum in legal fees and lost earnings. After this setback, he returned in 2018 to secure his best season numerically to date, winning 127 races for £1,346,189 in prize money. In 2021, he had a second Royal Ascot winner - Loving Dream in the Ribblesdale Stakes. On 27 February 2021, Forest of Dean recorded the biggest victory of his career when, ridden by Robert Havlin, he won the Group 3 Winter Derby over 1 mile 2 furlongs at Lingfield Park for trainer John Gosden and owners Godolphin, defeating Felix by three-quarters of a length.

He won his first Group 1 race after a 30-year wait in 2022 - the Fillies' Mile at Newmarket on the Gosden-trained Commissioning. He had previously won the Rockfel Stakes on her. After the win, fellow jockey and close friend Frankie Dettori paid tribute, calling Havlin "a key part of the team" and claiming that most of his success was down to Havlin having prepared most of the best horses in his life.

In 2023, he topped £1.5 million in prize money for the first time and ended the year 16th in the Jockeys' Championship. Among his big winners for the season were Lord North in the Winter Derby and Audience in the Criterion Stakes. Then, in May 2024, he added a second Group 1 victory, winning the Lockinge Stakes at Newbury on his stable's second string, Audience. To date, he has ridden over 1,200 winners.

He has been described as a rider with the "rare ability to relax headstrong horses".

He has two daughters, India and Lucia, with partner Kelly.

== Major wins ==
(United Kingdom) Great Britain

- Fillies' Mile - Commissioning (2022)
- Lockinge Stakes - Audience (2024)

== See also ==
- List of jockeys
