= Hungerford Stakes =

Flat horse race in Britain

- Class: Group 2
- Location: Newbury Racecourse; Newbury, England
- Inaugurated: 1949
- Race type: Flat / Thoroughbred
- Sponsor: Visit Malta
- Website: Newbury

Race information
- Distance: 7f (1,408 metres)
- Surface: Turf
- Track: Straight
- Qualification: Three-years-old and up
- Weight: 9 st 3 lb (3yo); 9 st 9 lb (4yo+); Allowances; 3 lb for fillies and mares Penalties; 5 lb for Group 1 winners * 3 lb for Group 2 winners * * after 2024
- Purse: £150,000 (2025); 1st: £85,065

Hungerford Stakes
2026
Coppull	Prince Of India	Symbol Of Honour

Previous years
2025
More Thunder	Witness Stand	Marvelman
2024
Tiber Flow	Witch Hunter	Jumby
2023
Witch Hunter	New Endeavour	Chindit
2022
Jumby	Dubai Poet	Wings Of War
2021
Sacred	Laneqash	Njord

2020-2011
2020
Dream Of Dreams	Breathtaking Look	Symbolize
2019
Glorious Journey	Librisa Breeze	Safe Voyage
2018
Sir Dancealot	Dream Of Dreams	Breton Rock
2017
Massaat	Librisa Breeze	Nathra
2016
Richard Pankhurst	Home Of The Brave	Dark Emerald
2015
Adaay	Coulsty	Breton Rock
2014
Breton Rock	Gregorian	Brazos
2013
Gregorian	Soft Falling Rain	Tawhid
2012
Lethal Force	Strong Suit	Alanza
2011
Excelebration	Beacon Lodge	Musir

2010-2001
2010
Shakespearean	Cat Junior	Ouqba
2009
Balthazaar's Gift	Regal Parade	Plum Pudding
2008
Paco Boy	Al Qasi	Beaver Patrol
2007
Red Evie	Welsh Emperor	Stronghold
2006
Welsh Emperor	Jeremy	Caradak
2005
Sleeping Indian	Majors Cast	Pivotal Flame
2004
Chic	Suggestive	Rum Shot
2003
With Reason	Tarjman	Ashdown Express
2002
Reel Buddy	Umistim	Gateman
2001
Atavus	Tamburlaine	Warningford

2000-1991
2000
Arkadian Hero	Cape Town	Siege
1999
Lend A Hand	Teapot Row	Exeat
1998
Muhtathir	Danish Rhapsody	Princely Heir
1997
Decorated Hero	Bin Rosie	Unconditional Love
1996
Bin Rosie	Mistle Cat	Magellan
1995
Harayir	Nijo	Darnay
1994
Young Ern	Pollen Count	Unblest
1993
Inchinor	Wolfhound	Swing Low
1992
Mojave	MojaveI	Pursuit Of Love
1991
Only Yours	Jimmy Barnie	Rami

1990-1988
1990
Norwich	Fedoria	Heart Of Joy
1989
Distant Relative	Great Commotion	Moviegoer
1988
Salse	Always Fair	Ohsomellow

The Hungerford Stakes is a Group 2 flat horse race in Great Britain open to horses aged three years or older. It is run at Newbury over a distance of 7 furlongs (1,408 metres), and it is scheduled to take place each year in August.

== History ==
The event is named after Hungerford, a town located several miles to the west of Newbury. It was established in 1949 and the first winner was Star King (later renamed Star Kingdom).

The Hungerford Stakes was formerly held on Newbury's left-handed course, with a distance of about 7 furlongs and 64 yards. For a period it was classed at Group 3 level. It was switched to the straight track in 2002, and promoted to Group 2 status in 2006.

== Records ==
Most successful horse (2 wins):

- Jimmy Reppin – 1968, 1969

Leading jockey (6 wins):

- Frankie Dettori – Inchinor (1993), Pollen Count (1994, dead-heat), Bin Rosie (1996), Decorated Hero (1997), Lend a Hand (1999), Shakespearean (2010)

Leading trainer (6 wins):

- John Gosden – Pollen Count (1994, dead-heat), Decorated Hero (1997), Muhtathir (1998), Sleeping Indian (2005), Gregorian (2013), Richard Pankhurst (2016)

== Winners ==
Year	Winner	Age	Jockey	Trainer	Time
1949	Star King (Note: The 1949 winner Star King was later exported to Australia and renamed Star Kingdom.)	3	Doug Smith	John C Waugh	1:33.00
1950	Hyberbole	5	Scobie Breasley	Noel Cannon	1:30.60
1951	La Valseuse	3	Manny Mercer	George Colling	1:29.40
1952	Agitator	3	Gordon Richards	Noel Cannon	1:30.80
1953	Olga	3	Gordon Richards	Noel Murless	1:27.40
1954	Tip The Bottle	5	Harry Carr	Joseph Lawson	1:31.20
1955	Princely Gift	4	Lester Piggott	Noel Murless	1:27.40
1956	High Bhan	4	Scobie Breasley	Sir Gordon Richards	1:34.60
1957	Picture Light	3	Eph Smith	Ted Leader	1:33.40
1958	Lovestone	3	Doug Smith	Noel Murless	1:33.00
1959	Agile	3	Garnie Bougoure	Vincent O'Brien	1:34.20
1960	Fagus	3	Scobie Breasley	Sir Gordon Richards	1:33.60
1961	Eagle	3	Greville Starkey	John Oxley	1:31.20
1962	Romulus	3	Wally Swinburn	Fulke Johnson Houghton	1:32.60
1963	Dunce Cap	3	Doug Smith	Cecil Boyd-Rochfort	1:33.00
1964	Derring-Do	3	Scobie Breasley	Arthur Budgett	1:27.80
1965	Roan Rocket	4	Lester Piggott	George Todd	1:29.80
1966	Silly Season	4	Geoff Lewis	Ian Balding	1:35.20
1967	St Chad	3	George Moore	Noel Murless	1:33.40
1968	Jimmy Reppin	3	Geoff Lewis	John Sutcliffe	1:36.80
1969	Jimmy Reppin	4	Geoff Lewis	John Sutcliffe	1:32.20
1970	Zingari	3	Willie Carson	Fulke Johnson Houghton	1:32.50
1971	Welsh Pageant	5	Geoff Lewis	Noel Murless	1:29.65
1972	Home Guard	3	Lester Piggott	Vincent O'Brien	1:30.28
1973	Brook	3	Pat Eddery	Peter Walwyn	1:31.11
1974	Pitcairn	3	Ron Hutchinson	John Dunlop	1:32.25
1975	Court Chad	3	Brian Taylor	Gavin Pritchard-Gordon	1:28.85
1976	Ardoon	6	Brian Taylor	Gavin Pritchard-Gordon	1:28.85
1977	He Loves Me	3	Tony Kimberley	Jeremy Hindley	1:28.90
1978	Tannenberg	3	Joe Mercer	Henry Cecil	1:31.28
1979	Skyliner	4	Geoff Baxter	Paul Cole	1:32.42
1980	Kampala	4	Pat Eddery	Peter Walwyn	1:34.95
1981	Dalsaan	4	Walter Swinburn	Michael Stoute	1:26.85
1982	Pas de Seul	3	Pat Eddery	David O'Brien	1:31.81
1983	Salieri	3	Lester Piggott	Henry Cecil	1:28.45
1984	Prego	4	Pat Eddery	Barry Hills	1:29.74
1985	Ever Genial	3	Steve Cauthen	Henry Cecil	1:32.89
1986	Hadeer	4	Steve Cauthen	Clive Brittain	1:28.80
1987	Abuzz	3	Tony Ives	Clive Brittain	1:29.54
1988	Salse	3	Steve Cauthen	Henry Cecil	1:30.30
1989	Distant Relative	3	Michael Hills	Barry Hills	1:31.14
1990	Norwich	3	Michael Hills	Barry Hills	1:28.52
1991	Only Yours	3	Michael Roberts	Richard Hannon Sr.	1:27.37
1992	Mojave	3	Walter Swinburn	Michael Stoute	1:31.99
1993	Inchinor	3	Frankie Dettori	Roger Charlton	1:26.28
1994 (dh)	Pollen Count; Young Ern	5; 4	Frankie Dettori; Willie Ryan	John Gosden; Simon Dow	1:31.07
1995	Harayir	3	Willie Carson	Dick Hern	1:28.30
1996	Bin Rosie	4	Frankie Dettori	David Loder	1:27.28
1997	Decorated Hero	5	Frankie Dettori	John Gosden	1:27.56
1998	Muhtathir	3	Richard Hills	John Gosden	1:26.86
1999	Lend a Hand	4	Frankie Dettori	Saeed bin Suroor	1:28.09
2000	Arkadian Hero	5	Jamie Spencer	Luca Cumani	1:26.36
2001	Atavus	4	Jamie Mackay	George Margarson	1:27.01
2002	Reel Buddy	4	Richard Quinn	Richard Hannon Sr.	1:23.61
2003	With Reason	5	Richard Hughes	David Loder	1:23.02
2004	Chic	4	Kieren Fallon	Sir Michael Stoute	1:23.99
2005	Sleeping Indian	4	Jimmy Fortune	John Gosden	1:24.68
2006	Welsh Emperor	7	Jamie Spencer	Tom Tate	1:26.76
2007	Red Evie	4	Jamie Spencer	Michael Bell	1:26.09
2008	Paco Boy	3	Ryan Moore	Richard Hannon Sr.	1:24.35
2009	Balthazaar's Gift	6	Philip Robinson	Clive Cox	1:25.31
2010	Shakespearean	3	Frankie Dettori	Saeed bin Suroor	1:26.38
2011	Excelebration	3	Adam Kirby	Marco Botti	1:24.72
2012	Lethal Force	3	Adam Kirby	Clive Cox	1:22.96
2013	Gregorian	4	Robert Havlin	John Gosden	1:25.84
2014	Breton Rock	4	Martin Lane	David Simcock	1:27.18
2015	Adaay	3	Paul Hanagan	William Haggas	1:26.76
2016	Richard Pankhurst	4	Robert Havlin	John Gosden	1:24.43
2017	Massaat	4	Jim Crowley	Owen Burrows	1:25.84
2018	Sir Dancealot	4	Gérald Mossé	David Elsworth	1:26.15
2019	Glorious Journey	4	James Doyle	Charlie Appleby	1:27.30
2020	Dream of Dreams	6	Oisin Murphy	Sir Michael Stoute	1:24.35
2021	Sacred	3	Tom Marquand	William Haggas	1:22.99
2022	Jumby	4	William Buick	Eve Johnson Houghton	1:22.50
2023	Witch Hunter	4	Sean Levey	Richard Hannon Jr.	1:25.24
2024	Tiber Flow	5	Tom Marquand	William Haggas	1:23.46
2025	More Thunder	4	Tom Marquand	William Haggas	1:21.67
2026	Coppull	3	Hector Crouch	Clive Cox	1:23.31

== See also ==
- Horse racing in Great Britain
- List of British flat horse races
