= Park Appeal =

Irish-bred Thoroughbred racehorse

- Sire: Ahonoora
- Grandsire: Lorenzaccio
- Dam: Balidaress
- Damsire: Balidar
- Sex: Mare
- Foaled: 9 April 1982
- Country: Ireland
- Colour: Brown
- Breeder: Mrs W Brannigan
- Owner: Patrick H Burns; Sheikh Mohammed
- Trainer: Jim Bolger
- Record: 8: 5-0-1

Major wins
- Moyglare Stud Stakes (1984); Cheveley Park Stakes (1984)

Awards
- Timeform rating: 122 (1984); Top-rated Irish-trained two-year-old filly (1984)

Park Appeal (9 April 1982 – 2005) was an Irish Thoroughbred racehorse and broodmare. She was one of the leading two-year-old fillies of 1984 when she was undefeated in four races including the Moyglare Stud Stakes in Ireland and the Cheveley Park Stakes in Britain. Her later career was disappointing and she was retired with a record of five wins in eight races between August 1984 and August 1986. Having been bought by Sheikh Mohammed at the end of her two-year-old season, she later became a highly successful broodmare for the Darley Stud.

== Background ==
She was sired by Ahonoora, whose other offspring included The Derby winner Dr Devious. Ahonoora was a representative of the Byerley Turk sire line, unlike more than 95% of modern thoroughbreds, who descend directly from the Darley Arabian. Park Appeal's dam Balidaress was a moderate racehorse, winning three minor races, but proved a very successful broodmare: her other foals included Desirable (who won the Cheveley Park Stakes and was the dam of Shadayid), Alydaress, and Balistroika, the dam of Russian Rhythm.

As a yearling, Park Appeal was offered for sale but attracted little interest and was sold for only 6,600 Irish guineas. By the time she was sent to the Newmarket Sales a year later the achievements of her older half-sister Desirable made her a more appealing proposition and she was bought for 62,000 guineas by representatives of Paddy and Seamus Burns, a father and son team who operated the Lodge Park Stud. The filly was sent into training with Jim Bolger at Coolcullen in County Carlow.

== Racing career ==
=== 1984: Two-year-old season ===
Park Appeal made her racecourse debut at Phoenix Park Racecourse in August 1984. In a maiden race over six furlongs she was restrained by her jockey before taking the lead in the closing stages and winning by one and a half lengths from Flatteuse. She returned over the same course and distance later that month and produced a similar performance in the Oldtown Stud Stakes, leading inside the final furlong to beat Periferique by three-quarters of a length.

Park Appeal next contested Ireland's most important race for two-year-old fillies, the Moyglare Stud Stakes over six furlongs at the Curragh in September. The race had been elevated to Group One status for the first time in the previous year and attracted a field of eleven fillies. Ridden by Declan Gillespie, Park Appeal overtook the English-trained filly Only inside the final furlong and accelerated clear to win by two and a half lengths. The filly was then sent to England for the Group One Cheveley Park Stakes over six furlongs at Newmarket Racecourse. In a field of thirteen runners, Park Appeal started the 4/1 second favourite behind Al Bahathri, the winner of the Lowther Stakes. The runners split into two groups on the wide Newmarket track, with Gillespie positioning Park Appeal just behind the leaders in the group furthest from the stand. Approaching the final furlong she took the lead from Polly Daniel and pulled away from her opponents to win by four lengths. Timeform described her performance as "comfortably the best by any two-year-old of her sex in a race in Britain or Ireland during the season."

After her win at Newmarket, Park Appeal was sold to Sheikh Mohammed for an undisclosed sum. Bolger considered running the filly in the Grand Critérium or the Breeders' Cup Juvenile Fillies, but she contracted a viral infection and did not run again in 1984.

=== 1985–1986: Later racing career ===
Although it was expected that she would contest either the 1000 Guineas or the Irish 1000 Guineas, Park Appeal's only start as a three-year-old came in the Poule d'Essai des Pouliches at Longchamp on 5 May. She started the 5/2 favourite, but finished seventh of the ten runners, four lengths behind the winner Silvermine. Gillespie said that she "never went a yard and ran no sort of a race".

In 1986, Park Appeal was sent to compete in the United States but had limited success in three races. On 16 May, more than a year after her previous appearance she finished third in an allowance race at Hollywood Park Racetrack and then.won the Country Queen Stakes at the same track on 1 June. When moved up to Grade III level, she finished unplaced behind Zenobia Express in the Modesty Handicap at Arlington Park in August.

== Assessment ==
In 1984 the independent Timeform organisation gave Park Appeal a rating of 122, three pounds below the French-trained Triptych, who was their top-rated two-year-old filly. In the official International Classification she was placed one-pound behind Triptych, making her the second best two-year-old filly in Europe and the best filly of her generation trained in Ireland.

== Breeding record ==
Park Appeal was retired from racing to become a broodmare for her owner, Sheikh Mohammed's Darley Stud. She produced at least nine winners from twelve foals and is the ancestor of many successful horses. Her recorded foals were:

- Pastorale (chestnut filly, foaled in 1988, sired by Nureyev), won two races, dam of Iffraaj (won Park Stakes, Lennox Stakes)
- Jenny Lake (bay filly, foaled in 1989, sired by Lomond)
- Arvola (brown filly, foaled in 1990, sired by Sadler's Wells), won one race, dam of Diktat (won Haydock Sprint Cup)
- Lord of Appeal (bay colt, foaled in 1992, sired by Sadler's Wells), won two races
- Cape Cross (bay colt, foaled in 1994, sired by Green Desert), won Lockinge Stakes, Queen Anne Stakes, sire of Ouija Board and Sea the Stars.
- Sherwood (bay colt, foaled in 1995, sired by Thatching)
- Pazienza (bay filly, foaled in 1996, sired by Arazi)
- Samood (brown colt, foaled in 1997, sired by Caerleon), won one race
- Phoenix Park (bay colt, foaled in 1999, sired by Sadler's Wells), won three races including Listed Prix Carrousel
- Mansfield Park (brown filly, foaled in 2001, sired by Green Desert), won two races
- Great Britain (bay colt, foaled in 2002, sired by Green Desert), won two races including Al Quoz Sprint
- Vincennes (brown filly, foaled in 2004, sired by King's Best), won two races including Group Three Kolner Herbst-Stuten-Preis

== Pedigree ==
Pedigree of Park Appeal (IRE), brown mare, 1982
Sire Ahonoora (GB) 1975	Lorenzaccio (GB); 1965	Klairon	Clarion
Sire Ahonoora (GB) 1975	Lorenzaccio (GB); 1965	Klairon	Kalmia
Sire Ahonoora (GB) 1975	Lorenzaccio (GB); 1965	Phoenissa	The Phoenix
Sire Ahonoora (GB) 1975	Lorenzaccio (GB); 1965	Phoenissa	Erica Fragrans
Sire Ahonoora (GB) 1975	Helen Nichols (GB); 1966	Martial	Hill Gail
Sire Ahonoora (GB) 1975	Helen Nichols (GB); 1966	Martial	Discipliner
Sire Ahonoora (GB) 1975	Helen Nichols (GB); 1966	Quaker Girl	Whistler
Sire Ahonoora (GB) 1975	Helen Nichols (GB); 1966	Quaker Girl	Mayflower
Dam Balidaress (IRE) 1973	Balidar (GB); 1966	Will Somers	Tudor Minstrel
Dam Balidaress (IRE) 1973	Balidar (GB); 1966	Will Somers	Queen's Jest
Dam Balidaress (IRE) 1973	Balidar (GB); 1966	Violet Bank	The Phoenix
Dam Balidaress (IRE) 1973	Balidar (GB); 1966	Violet Bank	Leinster
Dam Balidaress (IRE) 1973	Innocence (GB); 1968	Sea Hawk	Herbager
Dam Balidaress (IRE) 1973	Innocence (GB); 1968	Sea Hawk	Sea Nymph
Dam Balidaress (IRE) 1973	Innocence (GB); 1968	Novitiate	Fair Trial
Dam Balidaress (IRE) 1973	Innocence (GB); 1968	Novitiate	The Veil (Family: 14-c)
