= Haydock Sprint Cup =

Flat horse race in Britain

Sprint Cup
- Class: Group 1
- Location: Haydock Park; Haydock, England
- Inaugurated: 1966
- Race type: Flat / Thoroughbred
- Sponsor: Betfair
- Website: Haydock Park

Race information
- Distance: 6f (1,207 metres)
- Surface: Turf
- Track: Straight
- Qualification: Three-years-old and up
- Weight: 9 st 3 lb (3yo); 9 st 5 lb (4yo+); Allowances; 3 lb for fillies and mares
- Purse: £400,000 (2026); 1st: £226,840

Sprint Cup
2026
| Almeraq | Paborus | Big Mojo |

Previous years
2025
Big Mojo | Kind Of Blue | Flora Of Bermuda
2024
Montassib | Kind Of Blue | Unequal Love
2023
Regional | Shouldvebeenaring | Believing
2022
Minzaal | Emaraaty Ana | Rohaan
2021
Emaraaty Ana | Starman | Chil Chil

2020-2011
2020
Dream Of Dreams | Glen Shiel | Golden Horde
2019
Hello Youmzain | The Tin Man | Waldpfad
2018
The Tin Man | Brando | Gustav Klimt
2017
Harry Angel | Tasleet | The Tin Man
2016
Quiet Reflection | The Tin Man | Suedois
2015
Twilight Son | Strath Burn | Magical Memory
2014
G Force | Gordon Lord Byron | Music Master
2013
Gordon Lord Byron | Slade Power | Hoof It
2012
Society Rock | Gordon Lord Byron | Bated Breath
2011
Dream Ahead | Bated Breath | Hoof It

2010-2001
2010
Markab | Lady Of The Desert | Genki
2009
Regal Parade | Fleeting Spirit | High Standing
2008
African Rose | Assertive | Utmost Respect
2007
Red Clubs | Marchand D'or | Balthazaar's Gift
2006
Reverence | Quito | Amadeus Wolf
2005
Goodricke | La Cucaracha | Ashdown Express
2004
Tante Rose | Somnus | Patavellian
2003
Somnus | Oasis Dream | Airwave
2002
Invincible Spirit | Malhub | Three Points
2001
Nuclear Debate | Mount Abu | Monkston Point

2000-1991
2000
Pipalong | Sampower Star | Tomba
1999
Diktat | Bertolini | Arkadian Hero
1998
Tamarisk | Bolshoi | Tomba
1997
Royal Applause | Danetime | Tomba
1996
Iktamal | Blue Duster | Catch The Blues
1995
Cherokee Rose | Branston Abby | Owington
1994
Lavinia Fontana | Piccolo | Owington
1993
Wolfhound | Catrail | Lochsong
1992
Sheikh Albadou | Mr Brooks | Wolfhound
1991
Polar Falcon | Sheikh Albadou | Shadayid

1990-1981
1990
Dayjur | Royal Academy | Pharaoh's Delight
1989
Danehill | Cricket Ball | A Prayer For Wings
1988
Dowsing | Silver Fling | Caerwent
1987
Ajdal | Sharp Romance | Handsome Sailor
1986
Green Desert | Hallgate | Polykratis
1985
Orojoya | Primo Dominie | Dafayna
1984
Petong | Habibti | Never So Bold
1983
Habibti | Soba | On Stage
1982
Indian King | Great Eastern | Fearless Lad
1981
Runnett | Marwell | Sayyaf

1980-1978
1980
Moorestyle | Kampala | King of Spain
1979
Double Form | Ahonoora | Devon Ditty
1978
Absalom | Sanedtki | Vaigly Great

The Sprint Cup is a Group 1 flat horse race in Great Britain open to thoroughbreds aged three years or older. It is run at Haydock Park over a distance of 6 furlongs (1,207 metres), and it is scheduled to take place each year in early September.

== History ==
The event was established in 1966, and it was originally open to horses aged two or older. It was devised by Robert Sangster, the heir to the Vernons Pools business, who later became a leading racehorse owner/breeder. During the early part of its history the race was sponsored by Vernons and held in early November. It was initially contested on a course with a sharp left-hand bend.

The Vernons Sprint Cup was switched to September in 1979. It was transferred to Haydock's newly installed 6-furlong straight track in 1986. It was promoted to Group 1 status in 1988, the final year of Vernons' sponsorship. For a period the race was closed to two-year-olds, but it reopened in 1989. Juveniles were excluded again from 1994.

The Sprint Cup is currently sponsored by Betfair.

== Records ==
Most successful horse (2 wins):

- Be Friendly – 1966, 1967

Leading jockey (3 wins):

- Lester Piggott – Green God (1971), Abergwaun (1972), Moorestyle (1980)
- Pat Eddery – Record Token (1976), Dowsing (1988), Danehill (1989)
- Willie Carson – Boldboy (1977), Habibti (1983), Dayjur (1990)
- Bruce Raymond – Runnett (1981), Petong (1984), Sheikh Albadou (1992)

Leading trainer (4 wins):

- John Dunlop – Runnett (1981), Habibti (1983), Lavinia Fontana (1994), Invincible Spirit (2002)

Leading owner (4 wins):

- Sheikh Mohammed – Ajdal (1987), Wolfhound (1993), Cherokee Rose (1995), Goodricke (2005)

== Winners ==
| Year | Winner | Age | Jockey | Trainer | Owner | Time |
|---|---|---|---|---|---|---|
| 1966 | Be Friendly | 2 | Colin Williams | Cyril Mitchell | Peter O'Sullevan | 1:16.40 |
| 1967 | Be Friendly | 3 | Scobie Breasley | Cyril Mitchell | Peter O'Sullevan | 1:18.00 |
| 1968 | Abandoned due to fog | | | | | |
| 1969 | Tudor Music | 3 | Frankie Durr | Michael Jarvis | David Robinson | 1:14.80 |
| 1970 | Golden Orange | 4 | Jimmy Lindley | Ken Cundell | Lady Clifden | 1:15.60 |
| 1971 | Green God | 3 | Lester Piggott | Michael Jarvis | David Robinson | 1:15.90 |
| 1972 | Abergwaun | 4 | Lester Piggott | Vincent O'Brien | Charles St George | 1:16.16 |
| 1973 | The Blues | 2 | Richard Marshall | Bill Marshall | G. van der Ploeg | 1:17.10 |
| 1974 | Princely Son | 5 | Johnny Seagrave | Ken Cundell | Wilfred Sherman | 1:21.75 |
| 1975 | Lianga | 4 | Yves Saint-Martin | Angel Penna, Sr. | Daniel Wildenstein | 1:18.61 |
| 1976 | Record Token | 4 | Pat Eddery | Peter Walwyn | Sir Herbert Ingram | 1:19.50 |
| 1977 | Boldboy | 7 | Willie Carson | Dick Hern | Lady Beaverbrook | 1:19.21 |
| 1978 | Absalom | 3 | Taffy Thomas | Ryan Jarvis | Mrs C. Alington | 1:17.99 |
| 1979 | Double Form | 4 | Geoff Lewis | Fulke Johnson Houghton | Baroness H. Thyssen | 1:12.72 |
| 1980 | Moorestyle | 3 | Lester Piggott | Robert Armstrong | Moores Furnishings Ltd | 1:14.81 |
| 1981 | Runnett | 4 | Bruce Raymond | John Dunlop | Miss V. Evans | 1:14.14 |
| 1982 | Indian King | 4 | Greville Starkey | Guy Harwood | J. Levy | 1:12.51 |
| 1983 | Habibti | 3 | Willie Carson | John Dunlop | Mohamed Mutawa | 1:15.31 |
| 1984 | Petong | 4 | Bruce Raymond | Michael Jarvis | Tom Warner | 1:13.17 |
| 1985 | Orojoya | 3 | Brent Thomson | Jeremy Hindley | Robert Sangster | 1:16.24 |
| 1986 | Green Desert | 3 | Walter Swinburn | Michael Stoute | Maktoum Al Maktoum | 1:14.82 |
| 1987 | Ajdal | 3 | Walter Swinburn | Michael Stoute | Sheikh Mohammed | 1:14.87 |
| 1988 | Dowsing | 4 | Pat Eddery | Jeremy Tree | Khalid Abdullah | 1:17.24 |
| 1989 | Danehill | 3 | Pat Eddery | Jeremy Tree | Khalid Abdullah | 1:12.75 |
| 1990 | Dayjur | 3 | Willie Carson | Dick Hern | Hamdan Al Maktoum | 1:12.50 |
| 1991 | Polar Falcon | 4 | Cash Asmussen | John Hammond | David Thompson | 1:11.23 |
| 1992 | Sheikh Albadou | 4 | Bruce Raymond | Alex Scott | Hilal Salem | 1:14.17 |
| 1993 | Wolfhound | 4 | Michael Roberts | John Gosden | Sheikh Mohammed | 1:10.98 |
| 1994 | Lavinia Fontana | 5 | Jason Weaver | John Dunlop | Cyril Humphris | 1:11.42 |
| 1995 | Cherokee Rose | 4 | Cash Asmussen | John Hammond | Sheikh Mohammed | 1:13.74 |
| 1996 | Iktamal | 4 | Willie Ryan | Ed Dunlop | Maktoum Al Maktoum | 1:09.92 |
| 1997 | Royal Applause | 4 | Michael Hills | Barry Hills | Maktoum Al Maktoum | 1:14.46 |
| 1998 | Tamarisk | 3 | Tim Sprake | Roger Charlton | Highclere Racing Ltd | 1:11.30 |
| 1999 | Diktat | 4 | Frankie Dettori | Saeed bin Suroor | Godolphin | 1:11.04 |
| 2000 | Pipalong | 4 | Kevin Darley | Tim Easterby | Tom Bennett | 1:15.49 |
| 2001 | Nuclear Debate | 6 | Gérald Mossé | John Hammond | Bob Chester | 1:15.39 |
| 2002 | Invincible Spirit | 5 | John Carroll | John Dunlop | Prince A. A. Faisal | 1:12.44 |
| 2003 | Somnus | 3 | Ted Durcan | Tim Easterby | Legard / Sidebottom / Sykes | 1:13.49 |
| 2004 | Tante Rose | 4 | Richard Hughes | Roger Charlton | Bjorn Nielsen | 1:11.58 |
| 2005 | Goodricke | 3 | Jamie Spencer | David Loder | Sheikh Mohammed | 1:10.87 |
| 2006 | Reverence | 5 | Kevin Darley | Eric Alston | G. & L. Middlebrook | 1:15.78 |
| 2007 | Red Clubs | 4 | Michael Hills | Barry Hills | Ronald Arculli | 1:13.11 |
| 2008 (Note: The 2008 running took place at Doncaster) | African Rose | 3 | Stéphane Pasquier | Criquette Head-Maarek | Khalid Abdullah | 1:12.81 |
| 2009 | Regal Parade | 5 | Adrian Nicholls | David Nicholls | Dab Hand Racing | 1:13.74 |
| 2010 | Markab | 7 | Pat Cosgrave | Henry Candy | Tight Lines Partnership | 1:09.40 |
| 2011 | Dream Ahead | 3 | William Buick | David Simcock | Khalifa Dasmal | 1:10.36 |
| 2012 | Society Rock | 5 | Kieren Fallon | James Fanshawe | Simon Gibson | 1:10.20 |
| 2013 | Gordon Lord Byron | 5 | Johnny Murtagh | Tom Hogan | C. Poonawalla & M. Cahalan | 1:12.25 |
| 2014 | G Force | 3 | Daniel Tudhope | David O'Meara | Middleham Park Racing XVIII et al. | 1:12.95 |
| 2015 | Twilight Son | 3 | Fergus Sweeney | Henry Candy | Godfrey Wilson & Cheveley Park Stud | 1:12.86 |
| 2016 | Quiet Reflection | 3 | Dougie Costello | Karl Burke | Ontoawinner, Strecker & Burke | 1:13.45 |
| 2017 | Harry Angel | 3 | Adam Kirby | Clive Cox | Godolphin | 1:13.90 |
| 2018 | The Tin Man | 6 | Oisin Murphy | James Fanshawe | Fred Archer Racing - Ormonde | 1:14.13 |
| 2019 | Hello Youmzain | 3 | James Doyle | Kevin Ryan | Jaber Abdullah | 1:12.79 |
| 2020 | Dream of Dreams | 6 | Oisin Murphy | Sir Michael Stoute | Saeed Suhail | 1:14.07 |
| 2021 | Emaraaty Ana | 5 | Andrea Atzeni | Kevin Ryan | Sheikh Mohammed Obaid Al Maktoum | 1:09.10 |
| 2022 | Minzaal | 4 | Jim Crowley | Owen Burrows | Shadwell Estate | 1:08.44 |
| 2023 | Regional | 5 | Callum Rodriguez | Edward Bethell | Future Champions Racing Regional | 1:10.60 |
| 2024 | Montassib | 6 | Cieren Fallon | William Haggas | The Montassib Partnership | 1:10.31 |
| 2025 | Big Mojo | 3 | William Buick | Michael Appleby | RP Racing Ltd | 1:08.49 |
| 2026 | Almeraq | 4 | Tom Marquand | William Haggas | Shadwell Racing | 1:15.00 |

== See also ==
- Horse racing in Great Britain
- List of British flat horse races
