= Mustashry =

British Thoroughbred racehorse

- Sire: Tamayuz
- Grandsire: Nayef
- Dam: Safwa
- Damsire: Green Desert
- Sex: Gelding
- Foaled: 9 March 2013
- Country: United Kingdom
- Colour: Bay or brown
- Breeder: Shadwell Estate
- Owner: Hamdan Al Maktoum
- Trainer: Michael Stoute
- Record: 21: 9-3-1
- Earnings: £589,410

Major wins
- Strensall Stakes (2017); Gala Stakes (2018); Park Stakes (2018); Joel Stakes (2018); Lockinge Stakes (2019); Challenge Stakes (2019)

Mustashry (foaled 9 March 2013) is a British Thoroughbred racehorse. He finished fourth on his only run as a juvenile and won two minor races in the following year. As a four-year-old in 2017 he improved to win two races including the Group 3 Strensall Stakes. After being gelded he returned in 2018 to win the Gala Stakes, Park Stakes and Joel Stakes. In 2019 he won the Lockinge Stakes and the Challenge Stakes.

== Background ==
Mustashry is a bay or brown gelding with a small white star bred in England by his owner, Hamdan Al Maktoum's Shadwell Estate The colt was sent into training with Michael Stoute at the Freemason Lodge Stable in Newmarket, Suffolk. Mustashry was not an easy horse to train, being unhappy in a large group, and had to be exercised with only a lead horse for company.

He was from the fourth crop of foals sired by Tamayuz, a top-class miler who won the Prix Jean Prat and the Prix Jacques Le Marois in 2008. His other offspring have included Precieuse (Poule d'Essai des Pouliches), G Force (Haydock Sprint Cup), Blond Me (E. P. Taylor Stakes). Mustashry's dam Safwa showed modest racing ability, winning one minor race from six starts as a three-year-old in 2007. As a descendant of the Irish broodmare Astrid Wood (foaled 1944) she was distantly related to Levmoss, Le Moss and Nikoli.

== Racing career ==
=== 2015 & 2016: early career ===
On his only start as a two-year-old Mustashry started at odds of 7/1 for a maiden race over one mile on the synthetic Polytrack surface at Kempton Park Racecourse on 21 October and finished fourth, four lengths behind the winner Southern Gailes.

Mustashry began his second season by running second to Taqdeer in a maiden on Polytrack at Chelmsford City Racecourse on 16 April and recorded his first success in a similar event at Thirsk Racecourse three weeks later, winning "easily" by six lengths from fourteen opponents. The colt then moved up to handicap races for his next three starts beginning with the Britannia Stakes at Royal Ascot in which he finished twelfth under a weight of 127 pounds. On 23 July at the same track he was assigned a weight of 130 pounds and won the Woodford Reserve Handicap by a neck from the filly Pirouette. He was then matched against older horses at York Racecourse in August and finished second, beaten half a length by the four-year-old Firmament. On his final run of the season he was moved up in class and finished fourth behind Quebee in the Listed Fortune Stakes at Doncaster Racecourse on 14 September.

=== 2017: four-year-old season ===
In 2017 Jim Crowley became Mustashry's regular jockey and rode him on most of his subsequent starts. After being absent from the track for almost a year, the colt returned on 4 August and finished tenth behind Master The World in a handicap at Goodwood Racecourse. Eleven days later at Chelmsford Mustashry carried 136 pounds in the Moulsham Mile Handicap and produced a strong late run to win by half a length from Masham Star. In August at York the colt was stepped up to Group 3 class for the Strensall Stakes and started 5/2 favourite ahead of six opponents including Mondialiste (Arlington Million), Master The World and Sovereign Debt (Sandown Mile). Mustashry raced just behind the leaders before overtaking the front-running Forest Ranger inside the final furlong and was "driven out" by Crowley to win by three quarters of a length. After the race Crowley said "He did very well to win at Chelmsford the other day and he's not got too many miles on the clock... He's a nice horse." On 29 September he ended his season by finishing last in the Group 2 Joel Stakes over one mile at Newmarket Racecourse after failing to recover from a poor start.

=== 2018: five-year-old season ===
Before the start of the 2018 season Mustashry was gelded. After a break of over nine months Mustashry returned in the Listed Gala Stakes over ten furlongs at Sandown on 6 July. Starting at odds of 11/4 in a five-runner field he raced in third before taking the lead approaching the final furlong and won "readily" by half a length from Spark Plug. Hamdan Al Maktoum's assistant racing manager Richard Hills explained "We gelded him as he had a few problems and that has just helped him along. He is from a really good family. They try hard." When he attempted to repeat his 2017 success in the Strensall Stakes at York in August he took the lead a furlong out but was overtaken in the closing stages and beaten half a length by Lord Glitters.

At Doncaster on 15 September Mustashry started 5/2 favourite for the Group 2 Park Stakes in a nine-runner field which included Breton Rock (winner of the race in 2016), D'bai (John of Gaunt Stakes), Dutch Connection (Lennox Stakes), Tomyris (Chartwell Fillies' Stakes) and Unfortunately. Mustashry went to the front a quarter of a mile from the finish and after being overtaken a furlong out he rallied to regain the advantage in the final strides and won by a neck and a short head from D'bai and Dutch Connection. Jim Crowley commented "Obviously we were dropping back to seven furlongs and we couldn't see any obvious pace in the race. We got a little bit outpaced, but he was well on top at the line... It's great that he's so versatile and you can go from seven to 10 furlongs. He's a super horse that seems to be improving." Thirteen days later he ran for the second time in the Joel Stakes and went off the 15/8 favourite ahead of four opponents, namely Accidental Agent, Zabeel Prince, Regal Reality (Thoroughbred Stakes) and Zonderland (Sovereign Stakes). He started quickly before settling in second place behind Zabeel Prince and the pair dominated the race. Mustashry overtook his rival inside the final furlong and won by half a length.

On his final start of the year Mustashry was sent to Kentucky to contest the Breeders' Cup Mile at Churchill Downs on 3 November. Ridden by William Buick he started a 16/1 outsider and came home eleventh behind Expert Eye, beaten four lengths by the winner after being denied a clear run in the last quarter mile.

=== 2019: six-year-old season ===
Mustashry began his 2019 campaign when he was partnered by Dane O'Neill in the Earl of Sefton Stakes over eight and a half furlongs at Newmarket on 18 April and finished third behind Zabeel Prince and Forest Ranger. Crowley was back in the saddle when Mustashry contested his first Group 1 race, the Lockinge Stakes over one mile at Newbury Racecourse on 18 May. He went off at odds of 9/1 in a fourteen-runner field which included Laurens, Without Parole, Billesdon Brook, Romanised, Accidental Agent, Lord Glitters and Beat The Bank (Celebration Mile).The Britannia Stakes winner Ostilio set the pace before giving way to Laurens two furlongs out but Mustashry, who had settled well just behind the leaders, accelerated into the lead a furlong from the finish and drew away to win by two and a half lengths. After the race Michael Stoute paid tribute to the horse's groom Jade Ransley saying "Jade has made this horse. She rides him, looks after him like no other could. He's had niggles all his career but I don’t think we’ve ever had him in better shape. She is particularly dedicated". Ransley commented "It's one of those things you always dream of and you want to believe in the horse as much as you can but it's almost out of reach. And then he goes and does it like that... He's quite soft. He's definitely a girl's man, if I can put it that way. He has his own quirks, he's his own person. I've done everything with him since he was a baby".

At Royal Ascot in June Mustashry started second favourite for the Group 1 Queen Anne Stakes but came home seventh behind Lord Glitters after being hampered a furlong from the finish. The gelding was then stepped up in distance for the ten furlong Eclipse Stakes at Sandown on 6 July and finished fifth of the eight runners behind Enable. After the race he was "very sore" leading his connections to fear that he had sustained a serious pelvic injury, but veterinary investigations revealed no physical problem. After a three-month break Mustashry returned for the Group 2 Challenge Stakes over seven furlongs at Newmarket on 11 October and started the 2/1 second favourite behind the City of York Stakes winner Shine So Bright. Mustashry led from the start, accelerated in the last quarter mile, and won by one and a quarter lengths from Limato. Hamdan Al Maktoum's racing manager Angus Gold said "He is helped by a fantastic attitude. He loves his work and being back at the races. He is a lovely horse to have. He has had so many problems over his career, but when he is good he is good."

In the 2019 World's Best Racehorse Rankings Mustashry was given a rating of 121, making him the 29th best racehorse in the world.

=== 2020: seven-year-old season ===
The 2020 flat racing season was disrupted by the COVID-19 pandemic and Mustashry did not reappear until 20 June when he started at odds of 12/1 for the Queen Anne Stakes. Ridden by O'Neill he never looked likely to win and came home eleventh of the fifteen runners behind Circus Maximus. The gelding did not race again in 2020.

== Pedigree ==
Pedigree of Mustashry (GB), bay or brown gelding 2013
Sire Tamayuz (GB) 2005	Nayef (USA); 1998	Gulch	Mr. Prospector
Sire Tamayuz (GB) 2005	Nayef (USA); 1998	Gulch	Jameela
Sire Tamayuz (GB) 2005	Nayef (USA); 1998	Height of Fashion (FR)	Bustino (GB)
Sire Tamayuz (GB) 2005	Nayef (USA); 1998	Height of Fashion (FR)	Highclere (GB)
Sire Tamayuz (GB) 2005	Al Ishq (FR); 1997	Nureyev (USA)	Northern Dancer (CAN)
Sire Tamayuz (GB) 2005	Al Ishq (FR); 1997	Nureyev (USA)	Special
Sire Tamayuz (GB) 2005	Al Ishq (FR); 1997	Allez Le Trois (USA)	Riverman
Sire Tamayuz (GB) 2005	Al Ishq (FR); 1997	Allez Le Trois (USA)	Allegretta (GB)
Dam Safwa (IRE) 2004	Green Desert (USA); 1983	Danzig	Northern Dancer (CAN)
Dam Safwa (IRE) 2004	Green Desert (USA); 1983	Danzig	Pas de Nom
Dam Safwa (IRE) 2004	Green Desert (USA); 1983	Foreign Courier	Sir Ivor
Dam Safwa (IRE) 2004	Green Desert (USA); 1983	Foreign Courier	Courtly Dee
Dam Safwa (IRE) 2004	Nasanice (IRE); 1995	Nashwan (USA)	Blushing Groom (FR)
Dam Safwa (IRE) 2004	Nasanice (IRE); 1995	Nashwan (USA)	Height of Fashion (FR)
Dam Safwa (IRE) 2004	Nasanice (IRE); 1995	Mathaayl (USA)	Shadeed
Dam Safwa (IRE) 2004	Nasanice (IRE); 1995	Mathaayl (USA)	Manal (FR) (Family: 1-k)

- Mustashry is inbred 3 × 4 to Height of Fashion, meaning that this mare appears in both the third and fourth generations of his pedigree. He is also inbred 4 × 4 to the stallion Northern Dancer.
