= Lethal Force =

Irish-bred Thoroughbred racehorse

- Racing silks of Alan Craddock
- Sire: Dark Angel
- Grandsire: Acclamation
- Dam: Land Army
- Damsire: Desert Style
- Sex: Stallion
- Foaled: 10 April 2009
- Country: Ireland
- Colour: Grey
- Breeder: Declan Johnson
- Owner: Alan G Craddock
- Trainer: Clive Cox
- Record: 17:4-5-3
- Earnings: £746,568

Major wins
- Hungerford Stakes (2012); Diamond Jubilee Stakes (2013); July Cup (2013)

Awards
- Cartier Champion Sprinter (2013)

Lethal Force (foaled 10 April 2009) is an Irish-bred, British-trained Thoroughbred racehorse. As a two-year-old in 2011 he showed potential but failed to win in four races. In the following year he recorded his first major success when winning the Hungerford Stakes. In 2013, Lethal Force emerged as one of the leading sprinters in the world by defeating strong international fields in both the Diamond Jubilee Stakes and the July Cup.

== Background ==
Lethal Force is a grey colt bred in Ireland by Declan Johnson, a "hobby breeder" based in County Kildare. His sire Dark Angel, from whom he inherited his grey colour, won four races including the Mill Reef Stakes and the Middle Park Stakes as a two-year-old in 2007 before beginning his stud career in the following year. In addition to Lethal Force, his first crop of foals included the July Stakes winner Alhebayeb and the Chartwell Fillies' Stakes winner Lily's Angel. Lethal Force's dam, Land Army, showed no ability as a racehorse, but was descended from Miss Ribot, a mare whose wins included the Santa Ana Stakes in 1969.

As a foal, Lethal Force was sent by the Rathasker Stud to the Goff's sales in November and was bought for €9,500 by John Egan. In September 2010, Lethal Force was again put up for auction, this time at the Tattersalls Ireland sales and was bought for €8,500 by the trainer Clive Cox acting on behalf of Alan G. Craddock. Cox took the colt into training at his Beechwood Farm stable at Sheepdrove, near Lambourn in Berkshire.

== Racing career ==
=== 2011: two-year-old season ===
Lethal Force ran four times as a two-year-old without winning. He began his career by finishing in a five furlong maiden race at Ascot Racecourse in May, when he finished second as a 33/1 outsider. Later in the month he started favourite for a similar event at Goodwood but finished second, a short head behind Sir Glanton. He had hung to the right and then to the left in the closing stages, and after a stewards' enquiry he was demoted to third place. At Royal Ascot in June Lethal Force was moved up in class for the Group Two Coventry Stakes. Ridden for the first time by Adam Kirby, he started at odds of 50/1 and finished fourth of the twenty-three runners, less than two lengths behind the Aidan O'Brien-trained winner Power. In July, Lethal Force started at odds of 3/1 in the Vintage Stakes at Goodwood, but finished fourth of the seven runners behind Chandlery.

=== 2012: three-year-old season ===
Lethal Force began his three-year-old season by dropping back in class for a maiden race over 5 1/2 furlongs at Bath Racecourse on 20 April. Ridden by John Fahy, he started at odds of 30/100 and won easily by nine lengths. The colt was moved into Listed class for his next two races, finishing second by a neck in the Carnarvon Stakes at Newbury and third to Slade Power in the Sandy Lane Stakes at Haydock Park. In June, Lethal Force ran for the second year at Royal Ascot, running in the Group Three Jersey Stakes over seven furlongs. After appearing likely to take second place, he faded in the final strides and finished fourth behind the filly Ishvana. On 21 July, the colt started 4/6 favourite for a seven furlong race at Haydock but finished second to the filly Rhythm of Light after John Fahy dropped his whip a furlong from the finish.

On 21 August, Lethal Force started at odds of 25/1 for the Group Two Hungerford Stakes over seven furlongs at Newbury. The race appeared to lie between the Australian-bred Soul, who started favourite, and the Richard Hannon Sr.-trained Strong Suit. Ridden by Kirby, Lethal Force took the lead from the start, opened up a five length lead by half way and held off the late challenge of Strong Suit to win by a neck. In the Park Stakes at Doncaster Racecourse in September, Kirby attempted to repeat the tactics he employed at Newbury, but Lethal Force was caught inside the final furlong and finished third to Libranno. On 7 October, Lethal Force was sent to France to contest his first Group One race, the Prix de la Forêt over 1400 metres at Longchamp Racecourse. He took an early lead, but "weakened quickly" and finished tenth of the eleven runners behind Gordon Lord Byron.

=== 2013: four-year-old season ===
Lethal Force made his four-year-old debut in the Duke of York Stakes at York on 15 May. He started at odds of 16/1 and finished second, beaten a head by Society Rock after racing alongside the winner throughout the final furlong. On 22 June, he was one of eighteen sprinters to contest the Group One Diamond Jubilee Stakes over six furlongs at Royal Ascot, and started at odds of 11/1. Kirby sent the colt into the lead from the start and then quickened clear of the field approaching the final furlong. He hung to the left in the closing stages, but held on to win by two lengths from Society Rock, with the Bahraini challenger Krypton Factor in third and Gordon Lord Byron in fourth. After the race Kirby said "I'm really, really pleased. We've always had a lot of respect for this horse and, to be fair to him, he's always ran his race without ever winning", while Cox commented "I'm thrilled for everyone. It's just amazing – this is what it's all about. Adam is such a brilliant rider, but it's fantastic for the whole team at home. When he sent him on, it was explosive."

On 13 July Lethal Force started 9/2 third favourite for the July Cup over six furlongs at Newmarket. His opponents included Society Rock from England, Sole Power and Gale Force Ten (Jersey Stakes) from Ireland, Shamexpress (Newmarket Handicap) from Australia and the South-African-trained favourite Shea Shea. As at Ascot, Lethal Force led from the start and went clear approaching the final furlong. He stayed on in the closing stages to win by 1 1/2 lengths from Society Rock, with Slade Power in third. His winning time of 1:09.11 established a new track record, beating the mark set by Stravinsky in 1999. Kirby described the winner as "a machine... a bull of a horse...the sky's the limit." Following the race, Lethal Force was rated the best sprinter in the world following the retirement Black Caviar in the July edition of the World Thoroughbred Rankings and there was speculation that he would be sent to Australia in the autumn to contest the Patinack Farm Classic.

On 4 August, Lethal Force was sent to France to challenge the outstanding mare Moonlight Cloud in the Prix Maurice de Gheest over 1300 metres at Deauville Racecourse. Lethal Force soon took the lead but was overtaken in the final furlong by Moonlight Cloud and finished second, beaten by 1 3/4 lengths. Lethal Force returned to England in September and started 5/2 favourite for the Haydock Sprint Cup. He was never able to reach the leaders and weakened in the closing stages, finishing ninth of the thirteen runners behind Gordon Lord Byron. Following his defeat it was announced that the colt would not race again and would be retired to become a breeding stallion at the Cheveley Park Stud.

== Stud career ==
As of 2020 Lethal Force stands for a stud fee of €6,000 at Haras de Grandcamp in Trun, Orne France.

=== Notable progeny ===
'c = colt, f = filly, g = gelding

Foaled	Name	Sex	Major wins
2017	Golden Horde	c	Commonwealth Cup

== Pedigree ==
Pedigree of Lethal Force (IRE), grey colt, 2009
Sire Dark Angel (IRE) 2005	Acclamation (GB); 1999	Royal Applause	Waajib
Sire Dark Angel (IRE) 2005	Acclamation (GB); 1999	Royal Applause	Flying Melody
Sire Dark Angel (IRE) 2005	Acclamation (GB); 1999	Princess Athena	Ahonoora
Sire Dark Angel (IRE) 2005	Acclamation (GB); 1999	Princess Athena	Shopping Wise
Sire Dark Angel (IRE) 2005	Midnight Angel (GB); 1994	Machiavellian	Mr. Prospector
Sire Dark Angel (IRE) 2005	Midnight Angel (GB); 1994	Machiavellian	Coup de Folie
Sire Dark Angel (IRE) 2005	Midnight Angel (GB); 1994	Night at Sea	Night Shift
Sire Dark Angel (IRE) 2005	Midnight Angel (GB); 1994	Night at Sea	Into Harbour
Dam Land Army (IRE) 2001	Desert Style (GB); 1992	Green Desert	Danzig
Dam Land Army (IRE) 2001	Desert Style (GB); 1992	Green Desert	Foreign Courier
Dam Land Army (IRE) 2001	Desert Style (GB); 1992	Organza	High Top
Dam Land Army (IRE) 2001	Desert Style (GB); 1992	Organza	Canton Silk
Dam Land Army (IRE) 2001	Family At War (USA); 1988	Explodent	Nearctic
Dam Land Army (IRE) 2001	Family At War (USA); 1988	Explodent	Venomous
Dam Land Army (IRE) 2001	Family At War (USA); 1988	Sometimes Perfect	Bold Bidder
Dam Land Army (IRE) 2001	Family At War (USA); 1988	Sometimes Perfect	Miss Ribot (Family:21-a)
