= Gala Stakes =

Flat horse race in Britain

Gala Stakes
2026
| Sallaal | Persica | Glacius |

Previous years
2025
Windlord | Caviar Heights | Jeff Koons
2024
Al Mubhir | Savvy Victory | Lion's Pride
2023
Savvy Victory | Poker Face | Saga
2022
Passion And Glory | Regal Reality | Addeybb
2021
Euchen Glen | Fox Tal | John Leeper

2020-2011
2020
Magny Cours | Aspetar | Fox Chairman
2019
Elarqam | Extra Elusive | First Nation
2018
Mustashry | Spark Plug | Big Country
2017
Spark Plug | Kidmenever | Jake's Hill
2016
Ayrad | Spark Plug | Gm Hopkins
2015
Tha'ir | Provenance | Sharp Sailor
2014
Windhoek | Amralah | Tha'ir
2013
Mandour | Afsare | Excess Knowledge
2012
Afsare | Songcraft | Cai Shen
2011
Class Is Class | Tazeez | Black Spirit

2010-2002
2010
Stotsfold | Prince Siegfried | Traffic Guard
2009
Kirklees | Covert Ambition | Tranquil Tiger
2008
Many Volumes | Bushman | Kandidate
2007
Harland | Tam Lin | Blue Bajan
2006
Kandidate | Windsor Knot | Alfie Flits
2005
David Junior | Forward Move | Green Noon
2004
Crocodile Dundee | Silence Is Golden | Sunstrach
2003
Ikhtyar | Royal Stamp | Naheef
2002
Izdiham | Hawkeye | Cape Town

The Gala Stakes is a Listed flat horse race in Great Britain open to horses aged three years and over. It is run at Sandown Park over a distance of 1 mile 1 furlongs and 209 yards (2,002 metres), and it is scheduled to take place each year in July. The race was first run in 2002.

== Records ==
Leading jockey since 2002 (3 wins):

- Richard Hills – Izdiham (2002), Ikhtyar (2003), David Junior (2005)

Leading trainer since 2002 (4 wins):

- Saeed bin Suroor – Kirklees (2009), Windhoek (2014), Tha'ir (2015), Passion and Glory (2022)

== Winners ==
| Year | Winner | Age | Jockey | Trainer | Time |
|---|---|---|---|---|---|
| 2002 | Izdiham | 3 | Richard Hills | Marcus Tregoning | 2:13.40 |
| 2003 | Ikhtyar | 3 | Richard Hills | John Gosden | 2:06.35 |
| 2004 | Crocodile Dundee | 3 | John Egan | Jamie Poulton | 2:10.99 |
| 2005 | David Junior | 3 | Richard Hills | Brian Meehan | 2:08.22 |
| 2006 | Kandidate | 4 | Seb Sanders | Clive Brittain | 2:08.28 |
| 2007 | Harland | 3 | Neil Callan | Michael Jarvis | 2:16.55 |
| 2008 | Many Volumes | 4 | Ted Durcan | Henry Cecil | 2:06.72 |
| 2009 | Kirklees | 5 | Frankie Dettori | Saeed bin Suroor | 2:07.60 |
| 2010 | Stotsfold | 7 | Adam Kirby | Walter Swinburn | 2:05.14 |
| 2011 | Class Is Class | 5 | Ryan Moore | Sir Michael Stoute | 2:06.95 |
| 2012 | Afsare | 5 | Kieren Fallon | Luca Cumani | 2:12.42 |
| 2013 | Mandour | 4 | Christophe Lemaire | Alain de Royer-Dupré | 2:07.29 |
| 2014 | Windhoek | 4 | Kieren Fallon | Saeed bin Suroor | 2:05.86 |
| 2015 | Tha'ir | 5 | James Doyle | Saeed bin Suroor | 2:05.28 |
| 2016 | Ayrad | 5 | Andrea Atzeni | Roger Charlton | 2:14.60 |
| 2017 | Spark Plug | 6 | Ryan Moore | Brian Meehan | 2:05.74 |
| 2018 | Mustashry | 5 | Jim Crowley | Sir Michael Stoute | 2:07.71 |
| 2019 | Elarqam | 4 | Jim Crowley | Mark Johnston | 2:07.11 |
| 2020 | Magny Cours | 5 | William Buick | André Fabre | 2:05.83 |
| 2021 | Euchen Glen | 8 | Paul Mulrennan | Jim Goldie | 2:08.97 |
| 2022 | Passion and Glory | 6 | Hollie Doyle | Saeed bin Suroor | 2:06.79 |
| 2023 | Savvy Victory | 4 | Tom Marquand | Sean Woods | 2:08.01 |
| 2024 | Al Mubhir | 5 | Tom Marquand | William Haggas | 2:09.30 |
| 2025 | Windlord | 3 | Colin Keane | Andrew Balding | 2:04.76 |
| 2026 | Sallaal | 4 | Ray Dawson | Roger Varian | 2:07.76 |

== See also ==
- Horse racing in Great Britain
- List of British flat horse races
