= Strong Suit =

American-bred Thoroughbred racehorse

- Racing silks of Julie Wood; Qatar Bloodstock and Qatar Racing
- Sire: Rahy
- Grandsire: Blushing Groom
- Dam: Helwa
- Damsire: Silver Hawk
- Sex: Stallion
- Foaled: 9 February 2008
- Country: United States
- Colour: Chestnut
- Breeder: McDowell Farm, Gainsborough Farm & Robert N. Clay
- Owner: Julie Wood; Qatar Racing Fahad Al Thani
- Trainer: Richard Hannon Sr. Simon Callaghan
- Record: 16: 5-2-2
- Earnings: £346,561

Major wins
- Coventry Stakes (2010); Jersey Stakes (2011); Lennox Stakes (2011); Challenge Stakes (2011)

Strong Suit (foaled 9 February 2008) is an American-bred, British-trained Thoroughbred racehorse. Although he never won a Group 1 race and was overshadowed by contemporaries such as Frankel and Dream Ahead he was a top-class performer over distances from six furlongs to one mile and was rated among the twenty best racehorses in the world at his peak. As a juvenile in 2010 he won the Coventry Stakes and was placed in both the Phoenix Stakes and the Middle Park Stakes. In the following year he took the Jersey Stakes, Lennox Stakes and Challenge Stakes as well as being narrowly beaten in the Prix Jean Prat. He failed to win as a four-year-old and made no impact when sent to race in the United States. After his retirement from racing he stood as a breeding stallion in India.

== Background ==
Strong Suit is a chestnut horse with a large white star bred by the Arkansas-based McDowell Farm in partnership with Gainsborough Farm and Robert N Clay. As a foal he was offered for sale at Keeneland in November 2008 and was bought for $27,000 by the bloodstock agent Margaret O'Toole. He was shipped to Europe and in August 2009 he was put up for auction at Goffs and was sold for £40,000 to Peter Doyle Bloodstock. He entered the ownership of Julie Wood and was sent into training with Richard Hannon Sr. at East Everleigh in Wiltshire. Strong Suit was ridden in all but one of his European starts by Richard Hughes.

His sire, Rahy (1985–2011), sired the winners of over three hundred races, including more than thirty at Group One/Grade I level. Apart from Strong Suit, his best progeny included Noverre, Serena's Song and Fantastic Light. Strong Suit's dam Helwa never contested a race but was a granddaughter of Private Colors, a full-sister to Personal Ensign.

== Racing career ==
=== 2010: two-year-old season ===
Strong Suit made his racecourse debut in a maiden race over six furlongs at Newbury Racecourse on 14 May and started the 6/4 favourite in a twelve-runner field. He recovered from being hampered when the front-running Straight Line veered to the left, took the lead a furlong out and won "going away" by one and three quarter lengths from Neebras. A month later the colt was stepped up sharply in class to contest the Group 2 Coventry Stakes over six furlongs at Royal Ascot and started the 15/8 favourite in a thirteen-runner field. After being repeatedly denied a clear run in the last quarter mile he produced a strong late run, caught the leader Elzaam in the last stride and won by a nose. Hughes commented "He's a bit raw and goofy. When I pulled him out to go around one after a couple of furlongs, he cocked his jaw and ran into the back of the other horse. It was like hitting a stationary car. How he got back up to win after that I don't know".

On 8 August, Strong Suit was sent to Ireland to contest the Group 1 Phoenix Stakes over six furlongs at the Curragh and was made the 4/9 favourite against six opponents. He took the lead approaching the final furlong but was overtaken in the final strides and was beaten half a length and a short head by Zoffany and Glor Na Mara. On his final start of the season the colt contested the Middle Park Stakes at Newmarket Racecourse on 1 October. Racing on soft ground he proved no match for the easy winner Dream Ahead but came home second of the eight runners.

In the official end of the year classification, Strong Suit was give a rating of 113, making him the 17th best juvenile colt in Europe.

=== 2011: three-year-old season ===
On 16 April Strong Suit started second favourite for the Greenham Stakes (a major trial for the 2000 Guineas) over seven furlongs at Newbury but made no impact and came home last of the six runners behind Frankel. He then underwent an operation to correct a breathing problem. After an absence of two months the colt returned to the track in the Jersey Stakes over seven furlongs at Royal Ascot a race in which he carried a five-pound weight penalty for his Coventry Stakes win a year previously. He started at odds of 11/1 in a nine-runner field which included New Deerfield (King Charles II Stakes), Splash Point (UAE 2000 Guineas), Havane Smoker (runner-up in the Poule d'Essai des Pouliches), Oracle (third in the Irish 2,000 Guineas) and the previously undefeated Western Aristocrat. After racing second place Strong Suit took the lead approaching the final furlong and won by half a length from New Deerfield.

Strong Suit was sent to France for the Prix Jean Prat over 1600 metres at Chantilly on 3 July. In a slowly-run race he made the running but was overtaken in the straight and although he rallied to briefly regain the advantage in the last 100 metres he was beaten a head and a nose by Mutual Trust and Zoffany in a three-way photo-finish. Later that month he was matched against older horses for the first time in the Lennox Stakes over seven furlongs at Goodwood Racecourse and started the 5/2 field in a nine-runner field which included Delegator (Duke of York Stakes), Red Jazz (Challenge Stakes), Libranno (Richmond Stakes). After tracking the leaders he went to the front a furlong out and accelerated away in the closing stages to win "comfortably" by one and a half lengths from Red Jazz. His assistant trainer Richard Hannon Jr. said "He might be a horse for the Sussex Stakes next year. I think he will get a mile in time but there are so many nice races like this for him to mop up". Following the race he was acquired privately by Qatar Racing.

Strong Suit was off the racecourse for well over two months before returning in the Challenge Stakes at Newmarket on 8 October. In a field of eight he started 13/8 favourite, just ahead of the filly Chachamaidee (Oak Tree Stakes) with the best-fancied of the others being Maqaasid another filly who had finished third in that year's 1000 Guineas. After tracking the pacemaking Across The Rhine he went to the front approaching the final furlong and quickly went clear of the field to win by four and a half lengths from Chachamaidee.

For his final run of the season Strong Suit was sent to the United States to contest the Breeders' Cup Mile at Churchill Downs on 5 November. He started second favourite behind Goldikova but was never able to challenge the leaders and came home tenth of the thirteen runners.

In the 2011 World Thoroughbred Rankings Strong Suit was given a rating of 123, making him the 17th best racehorse in the world and the fifth-best three-year-old colt.

=== 2012: four-year-old season ===
On his first run of 2012 Strong Suit ran in the Queen Anne Stakes at Royal Ascot in June but a third win at the meeting never looked likely to materialise and he finished tenth of the eleven runners behind Frankel. A return to six furlongs in the following month brought no better results as he came home eighth behind Mayson in the July Cup at Newmarket. At Newbury in August the colt was ridden by Ryan Moore produced his best effort of the season in the Hungerford Stakes as he produced a strong late run but failed narrowly to overhaul the 25/1 outsider Lethal Force. In the Haydock Sprint Cup on 8 September he started the 11/2 third choice in the betting but after leading for most of the way he tired badly in the closing stages and finished seventh behind Society Rock. In the Park Stakes a week later he started favourite but came home fourth behind Libranno after never threatening to win.

At the end of the year he was transferred to the stable of Simon Callaghan in the United States. On his only run for his new trainer he finished towards the rear of the field in the Grade II Arcadia Stakes at Santa Anita Park in February 2013.

== Stud record ==
At the end of his racing career Strong Suit was retired to become a breeding stallion at the Manjri Stud in Pune, India.

== Pedigree ==
Pedigree of Strong Suit (USA), chestnut stallion
Sire Rahy (USA) 1985	Blushing Groom (FR); 1974	Red God (USA)	Nasrullah (GB)
Sire Rahy (USA) 1985	Blushing Groom (FR); 1974	Red God (USA)	Spring Run
Sire Rahy (USA) 1985	Blushing Groom (FR); 1974	Runaway Bride (GB)	Wild Risk (FR)
Sire Rahy (USA) 1985	Blushing Groom (FR); 1974	Runaway Bride (GB)	Aimee
Sire Rahy (USA) 1985	Glorious Song (CAN); 1976	Halo (USA)	Hail To Reason
Sire Rahy (USA) 1985	Glorious Song (CAN); 1976	Halo (USA)	Cosmah
Sire Rahy (USA) 1985	Glorious Song (CAN); 1976	Ballade (USA)	Herbager (FR)
Sire Rahy (USA) 1985	Glorious Song (CAN); 1976	Ballade (USA)	Miss Swapsco
Dam Helwa (USA) 1995	Silver Hawk; 1979	Roberto	Hail To Reason
Dam Helwa (USA) 1995	Silver Hawk; 1979	Roberto	Bramalea
Dam Helwa (USA) 1995	Silver Hawk; 1979	Gris Vitesse	Amerigo (GB)
Dam Helwa (USA) 1995	Silver Hawk; 1979	Gris Vitesse	Matchiche (FR)
Dam Helwa (USA) 1995	Team Colors; 1988	Mr. Prospector	Raise a Native
Dam Helwa (USA) 1995	Team Colors; 1988	Mr. Prospector	Gold Digger
Dam Helwa (USA) 1995	Team Colors; 1988	Private Colors	Private Account
Dam Helwa (USA) 1995	Team Colors; 1988	Private Colors	Grecian Banner (Family: 6-a)

- Strong Suit was inbred 4 × 4 to Hail To Reason, meaning that this stallion appears twice in the fourth generation of his pedigree.
