= 2011 World Thoroughbred Rankings =

The 2011 World Thoroughbred Rankings was an assessment of Thoroughbred racehorses issued by the International Federation of Horseracing Authorities (IFHA) in January 2011. It included horses aged three or older which competed in flat races during 2011. It was open to all horses irrespective of where they raced or were trained.

== Rankings for 2011 ==
- For a detailed guide to this table, see below.

| Rank | Rating | Horse | Age | Sex | Trained | Pos. | Race | Surface | Dist. | Cat. |
|---|---|---|---|---|---|---|---|---|---|---|
| 1 | 136 | Frankel (GB) | 3 | C | GB | 1st | Sussex Stakes | Turf | 1,600 | M |
| 2 | 132 | Black Caviar (AUS) | 5 | M | AUS | 1st | Newmarket Handicap | Turf | 1,200 | S |
| 3 | 128 | Cirrus des Aigles (FRA) | 5 | G | FR | 1st | Champion Stakes; Grand Prix de Deauville | Turf | 2,000; 2,400 | I L |
| 3 | 128 | Danedream (GER) | 3 | F | GER | 1st | Prix de l'Arc de Triomphe | Turf | 2,400 | L |
| 5 | 127 | Canford Cliffs (IRE) | 4 | C | GB | 1st | Queen Anne Stakes | Turf | 1,600 | M |
| 5 | 127 | Rewilding (IRE) | 4 | C | GB | 1st | Prince of Wales's Stakes | Turf | 2,000 | I |
| 7 | 126 | Dream Ahead (USA) | 3 | C | GB | 1st | Prix de la Forêt | Turf | 1,400 | M |
| 7 | 126 | Excelebration (IRE) | 3 | C | GB | 1st | Hungerford Stakes | Turf | 1,400 | M |
| 7 | 126 | Nathaniel (IRE) | 3 | C | GB | 1st | King George VI and Queen Elizabeth Stakes | Turf | 2,400 | L |
| 7 | 126 | So You Think (NZ) | 5 | C | IRE | 1st | Eclipse Stakes | Turf | 2,000 | I |
| 11 | 125 | Rocket Man (AUS) | 6 | G | SIN | 1st | KrisFlyer International Sprint | Turf | 1,200 | S |
| 11 | 125 | Twice Over (GB) | 6 | H | GB | 1st | Juddmonte International | Turf | 2,080 | I |
| 11 | 125 | Workforce (GB) | 4 | C | GB | 1st | Brigadier Gerard Stakes | Turf | 2,010 | I |
| 14 | 124 | Drosselmeyer (USA) | 4 | C | USA | 1st | Breeders' Cup Classic | Dirt | 2,000 | I |
| 14 | 124 | Goldikova (IRE) | 6 | M | FR | 2nd | Queen Anne Stakes | Turf | 1,600 | M |
| 14 | 124 | St Nicholas Abbey (IRE) | 4 | C | IRE | 1st | Breeders' Cup Turf | Turf | 2,400 | L |
| 17 | 123 | Acclamation (USA) | 5 | H | USA | 1st | Eddie Read Stakes | Turf | 1,800 | M |
| 17 | 123 | Americain (USA) | 6 | H | FR | 4th | Melbourne Cup | Turf | 3,200 | E |
| 17 | 123 | Orfevre (JPN) | 3 | C | JPN | 1st | Arima Kinen | Turf | 2,500 | L |
| 17 | 123 | Sepoy (AUS) | 3 | C | AUS | 1st | Manikato Stakes | Turf | 1,200 | S |
| 17 | 123 | Strong Suit (USA) | 3 | C | GB | 1st | Challenge Stakes | Turf | 1,400 | M |
| 17 | 123 | Tizway (USA) | 6 | H | USA | 1st | Whitney Handicap | Dirt | 1,900 | M |
| 23 | 122 | Ambitious Dragon (NZ) | 5 | G | HK | 1st | National Day Cup | Turf | 1,400 | M |
| 23 | 122 | Behkabad (FR) | 4 | C | FR | 2nd | Grand Prix de Chantilly | Turf | 2,400 | L |
| 23 | 122 | Caleb's Posse (USA) | 3 | C | USA | 1st | Breeders' Cup Dirt Mile | Turf | 1,600 | M |
| 23 | 122 | Cape Blanco (IRE) | 4 | C | IRE | 1st | Arlington Million | Turf | 2,000 | I |
| 23 | 122 | Dick Turpin (IRE) | 4 | C | GB | 1st | Premio Vittorio di Capua | Turf | 1,600 | M |
| 23 | 122 | Game On Dude (USA) | 4 | G | USA | 2nd | Breeders' Cup Classic | Dirt | 2,000 | I |
| 23 | 122 | Hay List (AUS) | 6 | G | AUS | 2nd 1st | TJ Smith Stakes; All Aged Stakes | Turf | 1,200; 1,400 | S M |
| 23 | 122 | J J The Jet Plane (SAF) | 7 | G | SAF | 1st | Dubai Duty Free Finest Surprise H | Turf | 1,200 | S |
| 23 | 122 | Meandre (FR) | 3 | C | FR | 1st | Grand Prix de Paris | Turf | 2,400 | L |
| 23 | 122 | Planteur (IRE) | 4 | C | FR | 1st | Prix Ganay | Turf | 2,100 | I |
| 23 | 122 | Pour Moi (IRE) | 3 | C | FR | 1st | Epsom Derby | Turf | 2,400 | L |
| 23 | 122 | Reliable Man (GB) | 3 | C | FR | 1st | Prix Niel | Turf | 2,400 | L |
| 23 | 122 | Snow Fairy (IRE) | 4 | F | GB | 2nd | Irish Champion Stakes | Turf | 2,000 | I |
| 23 | 122 | Tosen Jordan (JPN) | 5 | H | JPN | 1st 2nd | Tenno Sho; Japan Cup | Turf | 2,000; 2,400 | I L |
| 23 | 122 | Victoire Pisa (JPN) | 4 | C | JPN | 1st | Nakayama Kinen; Dubai World Cup | Turf; Artificial | 1,800; 2,000 | M I |
| 38 | 121 | Animal Kingdom (USA) | 3 | C | USA | 1st | Kentucky Derby | Dirt | 2,000 | I |
| 38 | 121 | Atlantic Jewel (AUS) | 3 | F | AUS | 1st | The Thousand Guineas; Wakeful Stakes | Turf | 1,600; 2,000 | M I |
| 38 | 121 | Await the Dawn (USA) | 4 | C | IRE | 1st | Huxley Stakes; Hardwicke Stakes | Turf | 2,070; 2,400 | I L |
| 38 | 121 | Byword (GB) | 5 | H | FR | 1st | Prix Dollar | Turf | 2,000 | I |
| 38 | 121 | Cityscape (GB) | 5 | H | GB | 3rd | Queen Anne Stakes | Turf | 1,600 | M |
| 38 | 121 | Court Vision (USA) | 6 | H | USA | 1st | Breeders' Cup Mile | Turf | 1,600 | M |
| 38 | 121 | Dark Shadow (JPN) | 4 | C | JPN | 2nd | Tenno Sho | Turf | 2,000 | I |
| 38 | 121 | Earnestly (JPN) | 6 | H | JPN | 1st | Takarazuka Kinen | Turf | 2,200 | L |
| 38 | 121 | Fame and Glory (GB) | 5 | H | IRE | 1st | Ascot Gold Cup | Turf | 4,000 | E |
| 38 | 121 | Immortal Verse (IRE) | 3 | F | FR | 1st | Prix Jacques Le Marois | Turf | 1,600 | M |
| 38 | 121 | Masked Marvel (GB) | 3 | C | GB | 1st | St. Leger Stakes | Turf | 2,920 | E |
| 38 | 121 | Monterosso (GB) | 4 | C | UAE | 3rd | Dubai World Cup | Artificial | 2,000 | I |
| 38 | 121 | Sacred Kingdom (AUS) | 8 | G | HK | 1st | Sha Tin Sprint Trophy | Turf | 1,000 | S |
| 38 | 121 | Sarafina (FR) | 4 | F | FR | 1st | Prix Corrida | Turf | 2,100 | I |
| 38 | 121 | Sea Moon (GB) | 3 | C | GB | 1st | Great Voltigeur Stakes | Turf | 2,400 | L |
| 38 | 121 | Shackleford (USA) | 3 | C | USA | 1st 2nd | Preakness Stakes; Haskell Invitational | Dirt | 1,900; 1,800 | I M |
| 38 | 121 | Teaks North (USA) | 3 | G | USA | 1st | United Nations Handicap | Turf | 2,200 | L |
| 38 | 121 | Transcend (JPN) | 5 | H | JPN | 2nd | Dubai World Cup | Artificial | 2,000 | I |
| 38 | 121 | Twirling Candy (USA) | 4 | C | USA | 2nd | Pacific Classic | Artificial | 2,000 | I |
| 38 | 121 | Uncle Mo (USA) | 3 | C | USA | 1st | Kelso Stakes | Dirt | 1,600 | M |
| 38 | 121 | Wise Dan (USA) | 4 | G | USA | 1st | Clark Handicap | Dirt | 1,800 | M |

== Guide ==
A complete guide to the main table above.

Rank
A horse's position in the list, with the most highly rated at number 1. Each horse is ranked once according to its highest rating. Any lesser ratings for the same horse are not ranked.

Rating
A rating represents a weight value in pounds, with higher values given to horses which showed greater ability. It is judged that these weights would equalise the abilities of the horses if carried in a theoretical handicap race. The minimum rating required for inclusion is 115.

Horse
Each horse's name is followed by a suffix (from the IFHA's International Code of Suffixes) which indicates the country foaled.

Age
The age of the horse at the time it achieved its rating. The racing ages of all horses foaled in a particular part of the world increase simultaneously, regardless of the actual date of foaling.
Dates of age increase by location foaled
| Northern Hemisphere | 1 January |
| South America | 1 July |
| Australia, New Zealand and South Africa | 1 August |

Sex
| C | Colt | Ungelded male horse up to four-years-old |
| F | Filly | Female horse up to four-years-old |
| H | Horse | Ungelded male horse over four-years-old |
| M | Mare | Female horse over four-years-old |
| G | Gelding | Gelded male horse of any age |

Trained
The country where the horse was trained at the time of the rating, abbreviated using the International Code of Suffixes.

Position
The horse's finishing position in the race shown. The actual finishing order can sometimes be amended following an inquiry or a disqualification.
| = | Dead-heat |
| ↑ | Promoted from original finishing position |
| ↓ | Relegated from original finishing position |

Race
The race (or one of the races) for which the horse achieved its rating. A defeated horse can be rated above its higher-placed opponents if it carried more weight.

Surface
The surface of the track on which the race was run, eg. turf or dirt. Synthetic surfaces are described as "artificial".

Distance
The distance of the race in metres. In some countries (eg. Canada, Great Britain, Ireland and the United States), the length of a race is usually expressed in miles and furlongs. These units have been converted to metres to allow for universal comparison.
Common conversions
| 5 furlongs | = 1,006 m | 1 mile and 1½ furlongs | = 1,911 m |
| 6 furlongs | = 1,207 m | 1 mile and 2 furlongs | = 2,012 m |
| 6½ furlongs | = 1,308 m | 1 mile and 2½ furlongs | = 2,112 m |
| 7 furlongs | = 1,408 m | 1 mile and 3 furlongs | = 2,213 m |
| 7½ furlongs | = 1,509 m | 1 mile and 4 furlongs | = 2,414 m |
| 1 mile | = 1,609 m | 1 mile and 6 furlongs | = 2,816 m |
| 1 mile and ½ furlong | = 1,710 m | 2 miles | = 3,219 m |
| 1 mile and 1 furlong | = 1,811 m | 2 miles and 4 furlongs | = 4,023 m |

Category
| | | Metres | Furlongs |
| S | Sprint | 1,000–1,300; 1,000–1,599 (CAN / USA) | 5–6.5; 5–7.99 (CAN / USA) |
| M | Mile | 1,301–1,899; 1,600–1,899 (CAN / USA) | 6.51–9.49; 8–9.49 (CAN / USA) |
| I | Intermediate | 1,900–2,100 | 9.5–10.5 |
| L | Long | 2,101–2,700 | 10.51–13.5 |
| E | Extended | 2,701+ | 13.51+ |

International Code of Suffixes
The following countries have been represented in the WTR as foaling or training locations since the first edition in 2004.
| ARG | Argentina | ITY | Italy |
| AUS | Australia | JPN | Japan |
| BRZ | Brazil | KSA | Saudi Arabia |
| CAN | Canada | NZ | New Zealand |
| CHI | Chile | SAF | South Africa |
| CZE | Czech Republic | SIN | Singapore |
| FR | France | SPA | Spain |
| GB | Great Britain | TUR | Turkey |
| GER | Germany | UAE | United Arab Emirates |
| HK | Hong Kong | USA | United States |
| HUN | Hungary | VEN | Venezuela |
| IRE | Ireland | ZIM | Zimbabwe |

Shading
The shaded areas represent lesser ratings recorded by horses which were more highly rated in a different category. The IFHA publishes this information when the lower rating is the overall top performance in a particular category.
