= Golden Horde (horse) =

Irish-bred Thoroughbred racehorse

- Racing silks of AlMohamediya Racing
- Sire: Lethal Force
- Grandsire: Dark Angel
- Dam: Entreat
- Damsire: Pivotal
- Sex: Colt
- Foaled: 11 February 2017
- Country: Ireland
- Colour: Chestnut
- Breeder: CN Farm Ltd
- Owner: AlMohamediya Racing
- Trainer: Clive Cox
- Record: 10: 3-1-3
- Earnings: £423,943

Major wins
- Richmond Stakes (2019); Commonwealth Cup (2020)

Golden Horde (foaled 11 February 2017) is an Irish-bred, British-trained Thoroughbred racehorse. As a two-year-old in 2019 he was one of the best colts of his generation in Europe, winning the Richmond Stakes, running second in the Middle Park Stakes and finishing third in the Prix Morny. On his first run as a three-year-old he won the Commonwealth Cup and went on to finish third in both the July Cup and the Haydock Sprint Cup.

== Background ==
Golden Horde is a chestnut colt with a white star bred in Ireland by James Cloney of CN Farm Ltd. As a yearling in August 2018 he was consigned to the Goffs UK Premier Yearling Sale and was bought for £65,000 by the trainer Clive Cox who took him into training at his stable at Lambourn in Berkshire. Golden Horde races in the colours of AlMohamediya Racing and has been ridden in most of his races by Adam Kirby.

He was from the second crop of foals sired by Lethal Force, an outstanding sprinter whose wins included the Diamond Jubilee Stakes and the July Cup. Golden Horde's dam Entreat showed modest racing ability, winning one minor races from eight starts. Her other foals have included the Pipalong Stakes winner Exhort. Entreat's dam River Saint was a half-sister to Serena's Song.

== Racing career ==
=== 2019: two-year-old season ===
On his racecourse debut Golden Horde started at odds of 6/1 for a maiden race over six furlongs at Newbury Racecourse on 17 May and finished fourth of the twelve runners, three and a quarter lengths behind the winner Light Angel. On 3 May at Windsor Racecourse the colt started the 6/5 favourite for a Novice race (for horses with no more than two previous wins) and recorded his first success as he won "readily" by four and a half length from Indian Creak after leading from the start. He was then stepped up in class for the Group 2 Coventry Stakes at Royal Ascot in which he started a 33/1 outsider and came home fifth of the seventeen runners behind Arizona, Threat, Guildsman and Fort Myers after hanging to the left in the closing stages.

At Goodwood Racecourse on 1 August Golden Horde contested the Richmond Stakes and went off at odds of 15/2 in a thirteen-runner field which also include Threat (who started favourite) and Guildsman. After settling in second place behind the front-running Misty Grey he went to the front approaching the final furlong and got the better of a "sustained duel" with Threat to win by three quarters of a length. Clive Cox commented "He is very talented and has got a lot of ability and a great mind... He got into a lovely rhythm and Adam said that it didn't feel they were going that fast which is the sign of a good horse. I'm delighted with his progression and I still think he is improving... It was great to watch the last 50 yards as he was gaining, not folding."

Seventeen days after his win at Goodwood, Golden Horde was sent to France for the Group 1 Prix Morny over 1200 metres on heavy ground at Deauville Racecourse and finished third behind Earthlight and the filly Raffle Prize with Arizona in fourth and A'Ali (Prix Robert Papin) in fifth. On his final run of the season, the colt faced his previous rivals Earthlight and Threat in the Middle Park Stakes at Newmarket Racecourse on 28 September. Starting a 16/1 outsider he took the lead a furlong from the finish but was overtaken by Earthlight in the closing stages and beaten a neck into second place.

In the official rating of European two-year-olds for 2019 Golden Horde was rated the seventh-best juvenile of the year behind Pinatubo, Earthlight, Kameko, Arizona, Millisle and Mums Tipple.

=== 2020: three-year-old season ===
The 2020 flat racing season in England was disrupted by the COVID-19 pandemic and Golden Horde did not reappear until 19 June when he started the 5/1 third favourite for the Commonwealth Cup over six furlongs at Royal Ascot. The Round Tower Stakes winner Lope Y Fernandez started favourite ahead of Pierre Lapin (Mill Reef Stakes) while the other thirteen runners included Millisle, Mums Tipple and the American-trained filly Kimari. Racing up the stands-side (the left side from the jockeys' viewpoint) he was in contention from the start, went to the front at half way and kept on well to win "readily" by a length and a half from Kimari with third place going to the 50/1 outsider Ventura Rebel. After the race Cox said "I was very proud of him. He's a lovely, big strong horse. He was a wonderful two-year-old, but with the size and scope, he's really strengthened into that frame as a three-year-old. He's uncomplicated and has a great cruising speed... He couldn't have pleased me more".

On 11 July Golden Horde was matched against older horses for the first time in the Group 1 July Cup over six furlongs at Newmarket Racecourse and started the 2/1 favourite in a twelve-runner field. He took the lead soon after the start but was overtaken in the last quarter mile and finished third behind Oxted and the Irish challenger Sceptical. In August the colt was sent to France for the Prix Maurice de Gheest over 1300 metres at Deauville in which he led for most of the way before being overtaken 200 metres from the finish and coming home fifth behind Space Blues, beaten one and a half lengths by the winner. On his final racecourse appearance Golden Horde started the 13/2 joint third favourite for the Group 1 Sprint Cup over six furlongs on soft ground at Haydock Park. He was among the leaders from the start as usual but was disadvantaged by racing on the far side of the track (the left side from the jockeys' viewpoint) and finished third behind Dream of Dreams and Glen Shiel both of whom raced down the opposite side.

Six days after his run at Haydock it was announced that Golden Horde had been retired from racing after sustaining a tendon injury. Clive Cox said "He suffered a tendon issue that proved to be longer term than first realised, so rather than miss a complete season it was with reluctance that it was decided to retire him to stud. It was a premature close to his racing career, and everyone was looking forward to his four-year-old season... Golden Horde had all the physical attributes to maintain his progress - plus a wonderful temperament. He danced every dance, no matter what the course or ground, and was a model of consistency at the highest level. We will all miss having him around".

== Stud career ==
In November 2020 it was announced that Golden Horde would begin his career as a breeding stallion at the Haras de Montfort & Preaux in Normandy with a stud fee of €10,000.

== Pedigree ==
Pedigree of Golden Horde (IRE), chestnut colt, 2017
Sire Lethal Force (IRE) 2009	Dark Angel (IRE); 2005	Acclamation (GB)	Royal Applause
Sire Lethal Force (IRE) 2009	Dark Angel (IRE); 2005	Acclamation (GB)	Princess Athena (IRE)
Sire Lethal Force (IRE) 2009	Dark Angel (IRE); 2005	Midnight Angel (GB)	Machiavellian (USA)
Sire Lethal Force (IRE) 2009	Dark Angel (IRE); 2005	Midnight Angel (GB)	Night At Sea
Sire Lethal Force (IRE) 2009	Land Army (GB); 2001	Desert Style	Green Desert (USA)
Sire Lethal Force (IRE) 2009	Land Army (GB); 2001	Desert Style	Organza
Sire Lethal Force (IRE) 2009	Land Army (GB); 2001	Family At War (USA)	Explodent
Sire Lethal Force (IRE) 2009	Land Army (GB); 2001	Family At War (USA)	Sometimes Perfect
Dam Entreat (GB) 2006	Pivotal (GB); 1993	Polar Falcon (USA)	Nureyev
Dam Entreat (GB) 2006	Pivotal (GB); 1993	Polar Falcon (USA)	Marie d'Argonne (FR)
Dam Entreat (GB) 2006	Pivotal (GB); 1993	Fearless Revival	Cozzene (USA)
Dam Entreat (GB) 2006	Pivotal (GB); 1993	Fearless Revival	Stufida
Dam Entreat (GB) 2006	River Saint (USA); 1996	Irish River (FR)	Riverman (USA)
Dam Entreat (GB) 2006	River Saint (USA); 1996	Irish River (FR)	Irish Star
Dam Entreat (GB) 2006	River Saint (USA); 1996	Imagining	Northfields
Dam Entreat (GB) 2006	River Saint (USA); 1996	Imagining	Image Intensifier (Family: 7)
