= Hyde Stakes =

Flat horse race in Britain

- Class: Listed
- Location: Kempton Park, Sunbury, England
- Race type: Flat / Thoroughbred
- Sponsor: Irish Stallion Farms
- Website: Kempton Park

Race information
- Distance: 1 mile (1,609 metres)
- Surface: Polytrack
- Track: Right-handed
- Qualification: Three-years-old and up
- Weight: 9 st 5 lb (3yo); 9 st 6 lb (4yo+); Allowances; 5 lb for fillies Penalties; 7 lb for G1 or G2 winners* 5 lb for G3 winners* 3 lb for Listed winners* * after 31 March
- Purse: £50,000 (2023); 1st: £28,355

Hyde Stakes
2025
Holloway Boy	Chancellor	Tyrrhenian Sea

Previous years
2024
Poker Face	Roi De France	Popmaster
2023
Grey's Monument	Tempus	Majestic Pride
2022
The Wizard Of Eye	Tinker Toy	Cash
2021
Madame Tantzy	Misty Grey	Caspian Queen

2020-2011
2020
Kinross	Khuzaam	Via Serendipity
2019
Set Piece	Khuzaam	Accidental Agent
2018
Flaming Spear	Hathal	Pattie
2017
Second Thought	Keystroke	Mr Owen
2016
Ennaadd	You're Fired	Sovereign Debt
2015
Big Baz	Very Special	Celestial Path
2014
Sloane Avenue	Cladocera	Graphic
2013
Sirius Prospect	Bertiewhittle	Galician
2012
Pearl Mix	Belgian Bill	Sirius Prospect
2011
Edinburgh Knight	The Shrew	Clinical

2010-2007
2010
Riggins	Fanunalter	Beauchamp Viceroy
2009
Without A Prayer	Re Barolo	Appalachian Trail
2008
Mac Love	Commander Cave	Tis Mighty
2007
Ventura	Wise Dennis	Raptor

The Hyde Stakes is a Listed flat horse race in Great Britain open to horses aged three years or older. It is run at Kempton Park over a distance of 1 mile (1,609 metres), and it is scheduled to take place each year in late November or early December.

The race was first run in 2007.

== Records ==
Leading jockey (4 wins):

- Jim Crowley – Ventura (2007), Without A Prayer (2009), Edinburgh Knight (2011), Pearl Mix (2012)

Leading trainer (4 wins):

- Ralph Beckett – Without A Prayer (2009), Pearl Mix (2012), Kinross (2020), Grey's Monument (2023)

== Winners ==
Year	Winner	Age	Jockey	Trainer	Time
2007	Ventura	3	Jim Crowley	Amanda Perrett	1:37.32
2008	Mac Love	7	Micky Fenton	Stef Liddiard	1:37.52
2009	Without A Prayer	4	Jim Crowley	Ralph Beckett	1:36.89
2010 (dh)	Riggins; Fanunalter	6; 4	William Buick; Adam Kirby	Ed Walker; Marco Botti	1:36.58
2011	Edinburgh Knight	4	Jim Crowley	Paul D'Arcy	1:36.80
2012	Pearl Mix	3	Jim Crowley	Ralph Beckett	1:37.76
2013	Sirius Prospect	5	Robert Winston	Dean Ivory	1:37.45
2014	Sloane Avenue	3	Frankie Dettori	Jeremy Noseda	1:36.34
2015	Big Baz	5	Graham Lee	William Muir	1:39.47
2016	Ennaadd	3	Jack Mitchell	Roger Varian	1:36.45
2017	Second Thought	3	James Doyle	William Haggas	1:37.71
2018	Flaming Spear	6	Robert Winston	Dean Ivory	1:37.17
2019	Set Piece	3	James Doyle	Hugo Palmer	1:36.27
2020	Kinross	3	Richard Kingscote	Ralph Beckett	1:36.43
2021	Madame Tantzy	5	Georgia Dobie	Eve Johnson Houghton	1:39.72
2022	The Wizard of Eye	3	David Egan	Stan Moore	1:39.67
2023	Grey's Monument	3	Hector Crouch	Ralph Beckett	1:37.41
2024	Poker Face	5	Harry Davies	Simon & Ed Crisford	1:37.56
2025	Holloway Boy	5	William Buick	Karl Burke	1:38.29

== See also ==
- Horse racing in Great Britain
- List of British flat horse races
