= Space Blues =

Irish Thoroughbred racehorse

- Racing silks of Godolphin
- Sire: Dubawi
- Grandsire: Dubai Millennium
- Dam: Miss Lucifer
- Damsire: Noverre
- Sex: Stallion
- Foaled: 12 February 2016
- Country: Ireland
- Colour: Chestnut
- Breeder: Godolphin
- Owner: Godolphin
- Trainer: Charlie Appleby
- Record: 19: 11-3-1
- Earnings: £1,916,642

Major wins
- Surrey Stakes (2019); Spring Trophy (2020); Prix de la Porte Maillot (2020); Lennox Stakes (2020); Prix Maurice de Gheest (2020); 1351 Turf Sprint (2021); City of York Stakes (2021); Prix de la Forêt (2021); Breeders' Cup Mile (2021)

Space Blues (foaled 12 February 2016) is an Irish-bred Thoroughbred racehorse. After winning his only race as a two-year-old in 2018 he improved in the following year to win the Surrey Stakes and went on to be placed in the Jersey Stakes, Prix Jean Prat and Prix Maurice de Gheest. He was even better as a four-year-old in 2020, winning the Spring Trophy, Prix de la Porte Maillot, Lennox Stakes and Prix Maurice de Gheest. He continued to compete at the highest level in 2021, winning the Prix de la Forêt before concluding his racing career with victory in the Breeders' Cup Mile.

== Background ==
Space Blues is a chestnut horse with no white markings bred in Ireland his owners, the Godolphin organisation. He was sent into training with Charlie Appleby at Newmarket, Suffolk.

He was from the tenth crop of foals sired by Dubawi, whose wins included the Irish 2,000 Guineas and the Prix Jacques Le Marois. Dubawi has sired winners such as Ghaiyyath, Monterosso, Al Kazeem, Makfi, Old Persian, Lucky Nine and Night of Thunder.

Space Blues's dam Miss Lucifer showed racing ability, winning three races including the Challenge Stakes, and became a successful broodmare whose other foals included the Al Maktoum Challenge, Round 1 winner Shurooq. She was a great-granddaughter of the British broodmare Sunbittern, whose other descendants have included In The Wings, High-Rise, Virginia Waters and Dubawi.

== Racing career ==
=== 2018: two-year-old season ===
On his first and only appearance as a two-year-old, Space Blues started 2/1 second favourite for a maiden race over eight and a half furlongs on good to soft ground at Nottingham Racecourse on 7 November. Ridden by James Doyle he took the lead a furlong from the finish and won by two and a quarter lengths from the favoured Private Secretary with Technician taking third place.

=== 2019: three-year-old season ===
On his first two starts of 2019 Space Blues was partnered by William Buick. He ran fourth when favourite for a minor race over ten furlongs at Newbury Racecourse on 12 April and was then beaten a head by Fifth Position when going off at odds of 1/3 for a similar event at Nottingham eighteen days later. Doyle took the ride when the colt was assigned top weight of 133 pounds for a handicap race over seven furlongs at York Racecourse on 15 May. He started the 5/2 favourite and despite being repeatedly denied a clear run in the last quarter mile he gained the advantage in the closing stages and sprinted clear to win by two lengths. Sixteen days after his win at York Space Blues was stepped up in class to contested the Listed Surrey Stakes over the same distance at Epsom Racecourse and went off the 6/5 favourite against six opponents. With Doyle again in the saddle he took the lead approaching the final furlong and held off the late challenge of Urban Icon to win by a neck.

At Royal Ascot on 22 June Space Blues started favourite for the Group 3 Jersey Stakes but after taking the lead inside the final furlong he was overtaken in the closing stages and was beaten a head by the 25/1 outsider Space Traveller. On 7 July he was sent to France to contest the Group 1 Prix Jean Prat over 1400 metres at Deauville Racecourse and finished second of the twelve runners behind the odds-on favourite Too Darn Hot. At the same track on 4 August he started at odds of 5.8/1 for the Prix Maurice de Gheest over 1300 metres and came home third, beaten a neck and three quarters of a length by Advertise and Brando.

=== 2020: four-year-old season ===
In the early part of 2020 Space Blues was sent to Godolphin's winter base in Dubai but made only one disappointing start at Meydan Racecourse on 7 March when he started favourite for the Group 3 Nad Al Sheba Turf Sprint but came home seventh behind Wildman Jack after hanging to the right on the left-handed track. On his return to Europe the colt started the 5/2 favourite for the Listed Spring Trophy over seven furlongs at Haydock Park on 7 June. Ridden by Doyle, he came from well off the pace to take the lead inside the final furlong and won by a neck from Safe Yoyage. Eighteen days later Space Blues was sent to France for the Group 3 Prix de la Porte Maillot over 1400 metres at Longchamp Racecourse in which he was ridden by Mickael Barzalona and started odds on favourite against seven opponents. After tracking the leaders on the inside he edged left to make his challenge in the straight, took the lead 120 metres from the finish and won "readily" by one and three quarter lengths from his stablemate D'Bai.

At Goodwood Racecourse on 28 July Space Blues was partnered by Buick when he went off the 5/2 favourite for the Group 2 Lennox Stakes. His ten opponents included Safe Voyage, D'Bai, Sir Dancealot (winner of the race in 2018 and 2019), Duke of Hazzard (Celebration Mile), Maries's Diamond (Anglesey Stakes), Pierre Lapin (Mill Reef Stakes) and Glorious Journey (Hungerford Stakes). After racing towards the rear of the field, Space Blues made "smooth progress" to take the lead approaching the final furlong and won "readily" by two lengths from Duke of Hazzard. After the race Charlie Appleby said "It was a pleasing performance. He was the class horse in the race. I always felt he travelled into it really well and he got a good run into it... William gave him a nice ride and had a nice clean run at it... He has definitely strengthened for sure."

On 9 August, with Buick in the saddle, Space Blues made his second attempt to win the Prix Maurice de Gheest and started the 4.4/1 second favourite behind Earthlight. The other nine runners included Golden Horde, Hello Youmzain, Wichita (runner-up in the 2000 Guineas), Wooded, Batwan (Prix de Saint-Georges), Spinning Memories (Prix du Palais-Royal) and Lope Y Fernandez (runner-up in the Prix Jean Prat). Hello Youmzain and Golden Horde disputed the early lead with Space Blues tucked away on the inside rail before making a forward move in the last 400 metres. He accelerated through a gap between the leaders, overtook Hello Youmzain 50 metres from the finish and won by three quarters of a length with Lope Y Fenandez, Earthlight and Golden Horde finishing close behind. After the race Appleby commented "This horse couldn't have come into the race in better shape and a better profile, with confidence behind him. Every race he has stepped up in calibre and has won more impressively. Today from halfway, I knew they'd gone a very strong gallop and I thought they were either very good horses in front or it was going to be set up for a horse that comes late" while Buick said "This horse has been threatening to put up a performance like that... He's got a great constitution. He's a Dubawi, which obviously helps, and they tend to get better with age." Space Blues was emulating his distant female-line ancestor Zariba, who won the inaugural running of the race in 1922.

In September, Godolphin announced that Space Blues had sustained an injury which would keep him off the track for the rest of the year.

In the 2020 World's Best Racehorse Rankings, Space Blues was rated on 120, making him the equal 40th best racehorse in the world.

== Pedigree ==
Pedigree of Space Blues (IRE), chestnut colt, 2016
Sire Dubawi (IRE) 2002	Dubai Millennium (GB); 1996	Seeking the Gold (USA)	Mr. Prospector
Sire Dubawi (IRE) 2002	Dubai Millennium (GB); 1996	Seeking the Gold (USA)	Con Game
Sire Dubawi (IRE) 2002	Dubai Millennium (GB); 1996	Colorado Dancer (IRE)	Shareef Dancer (USA)
Sire Dubawi (IRE) 2002	Dubai Millennium (GB); 1996	Colorado Dancer (IRE)	Fall Aspen (USA)
Sire Dubawi (IRE) 2002	Zomaradah (GB); 1995	Deploy	Shirley Heights
Sire Dubawi (IRE) 2002	Zomaradah (GB); 1995	Deploy	Slightly Dangerous (USA)
Sire Dubawi (IRE) 2002	Zomaradah (GB); 1995	Jawaher (IRE)	Dancing Brave (USA)
Sire Dubawi (IRE) 2002	Zomaradah (GB); 1995	Jawaher (IRE)	High Tern
Dam Miss Lucifer (FR) 2004	Noverre (USA); 1998	Rahy	Blushing Groom (FR)
Dam Miss Lucifer (FR) 2004	Noverre (USA); 1998	Rahy	Glorious Song (CAN)
Dam Miss Lucifer (FR) 2004	Noverre (USA); 1998	Danseur Fabuleux	Northern Dancer (CAN)
Dam Miss Lucifer (FR) 2004	Noverre (USA); 1998	Danseur Fabuleux	Fabuleux Jane
Dam Miss Lucifer (FR) 2004	Devil's Imp (IRE); 1996	Cadeaux Genereux (GB)	Young Generation (IRE)
Dam Miss Lucifer (FR) 2004	Devil's Imp (IRE); 1996	Cadeaux Genereux (GB)	Smarten Up
Dam Miss Lucifer (FR) 2004	Devil's Imp (IRE); 1996	High Spirited	Shirley Heights (GB)
Dam Miss Lucifer (FR) 2004	Devil's Imp (IRE); 1996	High Spirited	Sunbittern (GB) (Family: 9-e)
