= Lennox Stakes =

Flat horse race in Britain

- Class: Group 2
- Location: Goodwood Racecourse; W. Sussex, England
- Inaugurated: 2000
- Race type: Flat / Thoroughbred
- Sponsor: World Pool
- Website: Goodwood

Race information
- Distance: 7f (1,408 metres)
- Surface: Turf
- Track: Right-handed
- Qualification: Three-years-old and up
- Weight: 8 st 13 lb (3yo); 9 st 6 lb (4yo+); Allowances; 3 lb for fillies and mares Penalties; 5 lb for Group 1 winners * 3 lb for Group 2 winners * * after 2024
- Purse: £180,000 (2025); 1st: £102,078

Lennox Stakes
2026
Lake Forest	Rogue Diplomat	Witness Stand

Previous years
2025
Witness Stand	Lake Forest	Audience
2024
Audience	Art Power	Kinross
2023
Kinross	Isaac Shelby	Marbaan
2022
Sandrine	Kinross	Pogo
2021
Kinross	Creative Force	Happy Power

2020-2011
2020
Space Blues	Duke Of Hazzard	Escobar
2019
Sir Dancealot	Hey Gaman	Suedois
2018
Sir Dancealot	Suedois	Breton Rock
2017
Breton Rock	Home Of The Brave	Suedois
2016
Dutch Connection	Home Of The Brave	Gifted Master
2015
Toormore	Dutch Connection	Safety Check
2014
Es Que Love	Toormore	Anjaal
2013
Garswood	Caspar Netscher	Boom And Bust
2012
Chachamaidee	Libranno	Mac Love
2011
Strong Suit	Red Jazz	Beacon Lodge

2010-2000
2010
Lord Shanakill	Cat Junior	Dalghar
2009
Finjaan	Balthazaar's Gift	Regal Parade
2008
Paco Boy	Stimulation	Dunelight
2007
Tariq	Asset	Dunelight
2006
Iffraaj	Jedburgh	Assertive
2005
Court Masterpiece	Jack Sullivan	Majors Cast
2004
Byron	Suggestive	Kheleyf
2003
Nayyir	Arakan	Tante Rose
2002
Nayyir	Redback	Priors Lodge
2001
Fath	Munir	Mull Of Kintyre
2000
Observatory	Three Points	Swallow Flight

The Lennox Stakes is a Group 2 flat horse race in Great Britain open to horses aged three years or older. It is run at Goodwood over a distance of 7 furlongs (1,408 metres), and it is scheduled to take place each year in late July or early August.

== History ==
The event is named after the Duke of Lennox, one of the dukedoms held by the Duke of Richmond, the owner of Goodwood Racecourse. It was established in 2000, and the inaugural running was won by Observatory. It replaced the Beeswing Stakes, a discontinued race at Newcastle.

The Lennox Stakes was initially classed at Group 3 level, and it was promoted to Group 2 status in 2003. It was sponsored by Betfair from 2004 to 2010, and during this period it was known as the Betfair Cup. It was sponsored by Bet365 from 2011 to 2014.

The race is currently held on the opening day of the five-day Glorious Goodwood meeting.

== Records ==
Most successful horse (2 wins):

- Nayyir – 2002, 2003
- Sir Dancealot - 2018, 2019
- Kinross - 2021, 2023

Leading jockey (2 wins):

- Eddie Ahern – Nayyir (2002, 2003)
- Kerrin McEvoy – Byron (2004), Tariq (2007)
- Richard Hughes – Paco Boy (2008), Strong Suit (2011)
- Tom Queally - Lord Shanakill (2010), Chachamaidee (2012)
- Gerald Mosse - Sir Dancealot (2018, 2019)
- Frankie Dettori - Iffraaj (2006), Kinross (2023)

Leading trainer (2 wins):

- Marcus Tregoning – Fath (2001), Finjaan (2009)
- Gerard Butler – Nayyir (2002, 2003)
- Saeed bin Suroor – Byron (2004), Iffraaj (2006)
- Richard Hannon Sr. – Paco Boy (2008), Strong Suit (2011)
- Sir Henry Cecil - Lord Shanakill (2010), Chachamaidee (2012)
- David Elsworth - Sir Dancealot (2018, 2019)
- Ralph Beckett - Kinross (2021, 2023)
- John Gosden - Observatory (2000), Audience (2024)

== Winners ==
Year	Winner	Age	Jockey	Trainer	Time
2000	Observatory	3	Kevin Darley	John Gosden	1:25.67
2001	Fath	4	Martin Dwyer	Marcus Tregoning	1:27.19
2002	Nayyir	4	Eddie Ahern	Gerard Butler	1:24.98
2003	Nayyir	5	Eddie Ahern	Gerard Butler	1:27.06
2004	Byron	3	Kerrin McEvoy	Saeed bin Suroor	1:25.67
2005	Court Masterpiece	5	Philip Robinson	Ed Dunlop	1:26.23
2006	Iffraaj	5	Frankie Dettori	Saeed bin Suroor	1:25.58
2007	Tariq	3	Kerrin McEvoy	Peter Chapple-Hyam	1:26.93
2008	Paco Boy	3	Richard Hughes	Richard Hannon Sr.	1:26.59
2009	Finjaan	3	Tadhg O'Shea	Marcus Tregoning	1:26.46
2010	Lord Shanakill	4	Tom Queally	Henry Cecil	1:25.52
2011	Strong Suit	3	Richard Hughes	Richard Hannon Sr.	1:25.65
2012	Chachamaidee	5	Tom Queally	Sir Henry Cecil	1:26.82
2013	Garswood	3	Ryan Moore	Richard Fahey	1:27.30
2014	Es Que Love	5	Adam Kirby	Clive Cox	1:24.55
2015	Toormore	4	James Doyle	Richard Hannon Jr.	1:25.98
2016	Dutch Connection	4	James McDonald	Charles Hills	1:24.48
2017	Breton Rock	7	Andrea Atzeni	David Simcock	1:26.62
2018	Sir Dancealot	4	Gerald Mosse	David Elsworth	1:27.08
2019	Sir Dancealot	5	Gerald Mosse	David Elsworth	1:28.10
2020	Space Blues	4	William Buick	Charlie Appleby	1:27.48
2021	Kinross	4	Rossa Ryan	Ralph Beckett	1:31.02
2022	Sandrine	3	David Probert	Andrew Balding	1:24.58
2023	Kinross	6	Frankie Dettori	Ralph Beckett	1:28.75
2024	Audience	5	Robert Havlin	John & Thady Gosden	1:23.90
2025	Witness Stand	4	Hollie Doyle	Dr Richard Newland & Jamie Insole	1:24.55
2026	Lake Forest	5	Cieren Fallon	William Haggas	1:26.15

== See also ==
- Horse racing in Great Britain
- List of British flat horse races
