= My Dream Boat =

Irish-bred Thoroughbred racehorse

- Racing silks of Paul & Clare Rooney
- Sire: Lord Shanakill
- Grandsire: Speightstown
- Dam: Betty Burke
- Damsire: Choisir
- Sex: Stallion
- Foaled: 17 April 2012
- Country: Ireland
- Colour: Bay
- Breeder: Patrick Monahan
- Owner: Paul & Clare Rooney
- Trainer: Donald McCain; Clive Cox
- Record: 22: 6-4-1
- Earnings: £722,166

Major wins
- Prix du Ranelagh (2015); Prix Perth (2015); Gordon Richards Stakes (2016); Prince of Wales's Stakes (2016)

My Dream Boat (foaled 17 April 2012) is an Irish-bred, British-trained Thoroughbred racehorse best known for his upset victory in the 2016 Prince of Wales's Stakes. As a two-year-old in 2014 he showed promise but failed to win in three races. In the following year he made steady progress, winning two handicap races before moving up in class in the autumn to win the Listed Prix du Ranelagh and the Group Three Prix Perth. He improved again when campaigned over longer distances as a four-year-old, taking the Gordon Richards Stakes in April and then defeating a world-class field in the Prince of Wales's Stakes at Royal Ascot in June.

== Background ==
My Dream Boat is a bay horse with no white markings bred in Ireland by Patrick Monahan. Having been withdrawn from sale as a foal in November 2012, the colt was put up for auction at Goffs as a yearling in February 2013 and was sold for €3,500 to Patrick Moyles. My Dream Boat was offered for sale at Goffs again in October 2013 and attracted rather more interest, being bought for €16,000 by Shanavill Stables. In April 2014 the colt appeared at Doncaster in a "breeze-up" sale (one in which the horses are publicly galloped before being auctioned). He was bought for £40,000 by the trainer Donald McCain in partnership with Tom Malone. My Dream Boat entered the ownership of Paul and Claire Rooney and was taken into training with McCain at Cholmondeley in Cheshire.

He was from the first crop of foals sired by Lord Shanakill, a sprinter-miler whose biggest win came in the 2009 Prix Jean Prat. My Dream Boat dam Betty Burke showed very modest racing ability, with her only win in a twenty-race career coming in a minor handicap race at Fairyhouse. Her dam was a half-sister to Optimistic Lass, who won the Nassau Stakes in 1984 and was the female-line ancestor of Alice Springs, Golden Opinion and the Irish 1,000 Guineas winner Samitar.

== Racing career ==
=== 2014: two-year-old season ===
My Dream Boat made his racecourse debut in a maiden race over six furlongs at Hamilton Park Racecourse on 18 June in which he started a 33/1 outsider and finished second of the eight runners, two and three quarter lengths behind the winner Lady Desire. The colt was better fancied in his two subsequent races that year but failed to win as he finished second to Glenalmond at Ayr in July and fourth when starting favourite at Haydock in October.

Before the start of the following season, My Dream Boat was removed from McCain's stable and was sent to Lambourn where he was trained by Clive Cox.

=== 2015: three-year-old season ===
My Dream Boat spent most of his second season competing in handicap races. On his 2015 debut he was assigned a weight of 126 pounds over seven furlongs in a minor event at Doncaster Racecourse on 16 May and recorded his first victory, taking the lead approaching the final furlong and winning by two and a half lengths under a ride from Oisin Murphy. He finished fourth in a more valuable handicap at Goodwood a week later before finishing second under 129 pounds at Sandown on 13 June and then finished unplaced when moved up in distance for a handicap over one mile at Newmarket in July. In August at York Racecourse My Dream Boat carried 126 pounds and started a 33/1 outsider in a one-mile handicap in which he was ridden by Dane O'Neill. After starting slowly he made progress on the inside and overcame interference to take the lead a furlong out before drawing clear to win by two and a quarter lengths.

On 26 September My Dream Boat was matched against older horses for the first time in the Cambridgeshire Handicap over nine furlongs at Newamrket and finished eleventh of the 33 runners, five lengths behind the winner Third Time Lucky. In October the colt was sent to France and stepped up in class for the Listed Prix Ranelagh over 1600 metres at Chantilly Racecourse. Ridden by Christophe Soumillon he was made 3/1 second favourite behind Karar, who had finished fourth in that year's Poule d'Essai des Poulains. After racing in mid division he took the lead 200 metres from the finish and won "readily" by two and a half lengths from Leader Writer. On 1 November returned to France and was moved up in class again to contest the Group Three Prix Perth on very soft ground at Saint-Cloud Racecourse and started at odds of 8.5/1 against eleven opponents headed by the filly Fintry (winner of the Atalanta Stakes, Prix de Sandringham and Prix Bertrand du Breuil). The other fancied runners included Ride Like The Wind (Prix Djebel), Elliptique (Prix de Condé, Grand Prix de Vichy) and Johnny Barnes (Prix Quincey). With Soumillon again in the saddle My Dream Boat raced in mid-division before making progress on the stands-side (the right-hand side from the jockeys' viewpoint) to join the leaders approaching the last 200 metres. He overtook the outsider Momayyaz in the closing stages and won by one and a half lengths. Clive Co commented "My Dream Boat did it nicely. He liked the very soft ground and made us happy. He had already won with style in Chantilly. Christophe Soumillon gets on well with him and this helped him. For next year we could eventually see him over 2,000m."

=== 2016: four-year-old season ===
==== Spring ====
My Dream Boat began his third season in the Group Three Gordon Richards Stakes at Sandown in April, a race which saw him moved up in distance to ten furlongs. He was ridden by Adam Kirby and started the 8/1 third choice behind Western Hymn (winner of the race in 2015) and Tullius (Sandown Mile, York Stakes). After being restrained at the rear of the seven-runner field he began to make progress a quarter of a mile from the finish and "squeezed" through a narrow gap to challenge for the lead. He overtook Western Hymn 100 yards out and won by one and a quarter lengths. After the race Kirby said "He had a bit to do but he was finishing well. I knew if I had enough room I would get through... He's really improving and has got a good attitude. He's a very, very nice horse and if he keeps improving the sky's the limit."

In May the colt was promoted to Group One level for the first time when he was sent to France to contest the Prix d'Ispahan over 1800 metres on heavy ground at Chantilly Racecourse. He was never able to get into contention and finished fifth behind the emphatic Japanese-trained A Shin Hikari although he did finish in front of New Bay and the Grand Prix de Paris winner Erupt. The Guardian's correspondent however, pointed out that the colt did not get a clear run until the contest was effectively over and finished the race "quite nicely".

==== Summer ====
My Dream Boat was one of six horses who assembled to contest the Prince of Wales's Stakes over ten furlongs at Royal Ascot on 15 June and started the complete outsider at odds of 16/1. A Shin Hikari headed the betting ahead of Found, The Grey Gatsby, Western Hymn and Tryster (Jebel Hatta). The favourite went to the front from the start with Kirby holding up My Dream Boat at the rear of the field before switching to the outside to make his challenge in the straight. The Japanese champion faltered two furlongs out and gave way to Found with My Dream Boat quickly moving up into second. My Dream Boat maintained his run, overtook the Irish filly in the final strides and won by a neck with a gap of three and a half lengths back to Western Hymn in third. After the race Kirby admitted that he was not sure that he had won before the result of the photo-finish was announced. Cox said "I’m blown away. I was full of admiration for the Japanese horse when we took him on in France but I knew we didn’t quite run our race. He found a perfect rhythm today and really found when Adam asked him to stretch".

In his three remaining races of 2016 My Dream Boat failed to win but produced some creditable efforts in defeat. At Sandown in July he started joint-third favourite for the Eclipse Stakes but never looked likely to win and finished fifth behind Hawkbill, The Gurkha, Time Test and Countermeasure.

==== Autumn ====
The Irish Champion Stakes at Leopardstown Racecourse in September was arguably the best race run in Europe in 2016 and My Dream Boat started a 33/1 outsider in a twelve-runner field. He finished fifth behind Almanzor, Found, Minding and New Bay with Highland Reel, Harzand and Hawkbill finishing in seventh, eighth and ninth places. He ended his season in the Champion Stakes at Ascot on 15 October in which he stayed on in the closing stages to finish fourth of the ten runners behind Almanzor, Found and Jack Hobbs.

=== 2017: five-year-old season ===
On his five-year-old debut My Dream Boat started favourite as he attempted to repeat his 2016 success in the Gordon Richards Stakes but finished third behind Ulysses. He was then stepped up in distance for the Aston Park Stakes at Newbury and finished second to Hawkbill in May. In July he ran fourth in the Grand Prix de Saint-Cloud and then came home seventh behind the filly Enable. In the International Stakes at York in August he started a 28/1 outsider and finished last of the seven runners behind Ulysses.

== Assessment ==
In the 2016 edition of the World's Best Racehorse Rankings My Dream Boat was given a rating of 120, making him the 34th best racehorse in the world and the sixth-best horse trained in Britain.

== Pedigree ==
Pedigree of My Dream Boat, bay horse, 2012
| Sire Lord Shanakill (USA) 2006 | Speightstown (USA); 1998 | Gone West | Mr. Prospector |
| Sire Lord Shanakill (USA) 2006 | Speightstown (USA); 1998 | Gone West | Secrettame |
| Sire Lord Shanakill (USA) 2006 | Speightstown (USA); 1998 | Silken Cat (CAN) | Storm Cat (USA) |
| Sire Lord Shanakill (USA) 2006 | Speightstown (USA); 1998 | Silken Cat (CAN) | Silken Doll (USA) |
| Sire Lord Shanakill (USA) 2006 | Green Room (USA); 2002 | Theatrical (IRE) | Nureyev (USA) |
| Sire Lord Shanakill (USA) 2006 | Green Room (USA); 2002 | Theatrical (IRE) | Tree of Knowledge |
| Sire Lord Shanakill (USA) 2006 | Green Room (USA); 2002 | Chain Fern | Blushing Groom (FR) |
| Sire Lord Shanakill (USA) 2006 | Green Room (USA); 2002 | Chain Fern | Chain Store |
| Dam Betty Burke (GB) 2005 | Choisir (AUS); 1999 | Danehill Dancer (IRE) | Danehill (USA) |
| Dam Betty Burke (GB) 2005 | Choisir (AUS); 1999 | Danehill Dancer (IRE) | Mira Adonde (USA) |
| Dam Betty Burke (GB) 2005 | Choisir (AUS); 1999 | Great Selection | Lunchtime (GB) |
| Dam Betty Burke (GB) 2005 | Choisir (AUS); 1999 | Great Selection | Pensive Mood |
| Dam Betty Burke (GB) 2005 | Island Lover (IRE); 1996 | Turtle Island | Fairy King (USA) |
| Dam Betty Burke (GB) 2005 | Island Lover (IRE); 1996 | Turtle Island | Sisania (GB) |
| Dam Betty Burke (GB) 2005 | Island Lover (IRE); 1996 | Loveliest (USA) | Tibaldo (ARG) |
| Dam Betty Burke (GB) 2005 | Island Lover (IRE); 1996 | Loveliest (USA) | Lovely Ann (Family: 2-f) |
