= British Flat Jockeys Championship 2014 =

The 2014 British Flat Jockeys Championship was the competition to find the jockey with the most wins in Great Britain during the traditional flat racing season from the Lincoln Handicap meeting at Doncaster Racecourse in March until the November Handicap meeting at the same racecourse in November. It was won by Richard Hughes for the third year in a row.

== Final table ==
Rank	Jockey	Wins	Rides	Strike rate
1	Richard Hughes	161		
2	Ryan Moore	155		
3	Graham Lee	127		
4	William Buick	120		
5	Adam Kirby	119		
