= Ventura (horse) =

American-bred Thoroughbred racehorse

- Sire: Chester House
- Grandsire: Mr. Prospector
- Dam: Estala
- Damsire: Be My Guest
- Sex: Mare
- Foaled: 2004
- Country: United States
- Colour: Dark Bay/Brown
- Breeder: Khalid bin Abdullah Al Saud; Juddmonte Farms
- Owner: Juddmonte Farms
- Trainer: Amanda J.Perrett (UK); Robert J. Frankel (USA)
- Record: 21: 10-8-1
- Earnings: $2,580,367

Major wins
- Hyde Stakes (2007); Just A Game Handicap (2008); Vinery Madison Stakes (2008); Santa Monica Handicap (2009); Woodbine Mile (2009); Matriarch Stakes (2009); Breeders' Cup wins: Breeders' Cup Filly & Mare Sprint (2008)

Ventura (foaled January 31, 2004 in Kentucky) is a Thoroughbred racehorse who competed in the United Kingdom and the United States.

== Background ==
Ventura, a dark bay filly with a white blaze was a homebred raced by Khalid Abdulla's Juddmonte Farms. She was from the last crop of foals sired by Chester House, who died in 2003 and is one of at least six winners produced by the mare Estala. Ventura was originally sent to Europe to be trained by Amanda Perrett, but had all her greatest successes after being returned to the United States at the end of her three-year-old season.

== Racing career ==
=== Britain ===
In 2006, the two-year-old Ventura made one start at the Lingfield Racecourse on Polytrack synthetic dirt, finishing off the board. In 2007, she raced in the United Kingdom where she had three wins and three seconds from seven starts. Her first six races were all on turf but her last came on synthetic dirt in the Hyde Stakes at Kempton Park Racecourse.

=== United States ===
Sent to the United States for 2008, Ventura won three Grade I stakes for trainer, Robert Frankel. She captured the Just A Game Handicap on the turf at Belmont Park and the Vinery Madison Stakes on Polytrack synthetic dirt at Keeneland before winning the richest and most important race of her career, the US$1 million Breeders' Cup Filly & Mare Sprint on the synthetic dirt at Santa Anita Park. In this race she was tenth after half a mile but came around the outside on the turn into the straight to win under Garrett Gomez.

At age five in 2009, Ventura won two more Grade I races in the United States and the Grade I Woodbine Mile in Canada. Defending her Breeders' Cup Filly & Mare Sprint title, Venture ran second to Informed Decision on the synthetic dirt at Santa Anita Park. Ventura finished her career with a win in the Grade 1 Matriarch Stakes, setting a stakes record time of 1:33.58.
