= Kinross (horse) =

British Thoroughbred racehorse

- Kinross in retirement, July 2026
- Sire: Kingman
- Grandsire: Invincible Spirit
- Dam: Ceilidh House
- Damsire: Selkirk
- Sex: Gelding
- Foaled: 6 May 2017
- Country: Britain
- Colour: Bay
- Breeder: Lawn Stud
- Owner: J H Richmond-Watson; Marc Chan
- Trainer: Ralph Beckett
- Record: 35: 11-6-4
- Earnings: £1,972,389

Major wins
- Hyde Stakes (2020); John of Gaunt Stakes (2021); Lennox Stakes (2021, 2023); City of York Stakes (2022, 2023); Park Stakes (2022, 2024); Prix de la Forêt (2022); British Champions Sprint Stakes (2022)

Kinross (6 May 2017) is a British Thoroughbred racehorse who competed on the flat, mostly over distances of six or seven furlongs. Over a career spanning seven seasons, he won nine Group races, including the 2022 Group 1 Prix de la Forêt and British Champions Sprint Stakes. Retired at the age of eight, he joined the living legends at the National Stud in Newmarket.

== Background ==
Kinross is a bay gelding with a small white star and snip bred in England by Julian Richmond-Watson at Lawn Stud. His sire was leading stallion Kingman while his dam, Ceilidh House, was winner of a Listed race. He went into training with Ralph Beckett at Kimpton, Hampshire.

== Racing career ==
=== 2019: two-year-old season ===
On his first racecourse appearance, on 5 October 2019, Kinross was ridden by Harry Bentley and won a Novice Stakes over seven furlongs at Newmarket by eight lengths. He was then stepped up to a mile for the Group 1 Futurity Trophy, normally run at Doncaster Racecourse but rescheduled to be run at Newcastle as the course at Doncaster was waterlogged. It was the first time a British Group 1 race was run on the all-weather surface. Kinross started as favourite and came fifth in a field of eleven, beaten 6 1/4 lengths by Kameko.

=== 2020: three-year-old season ===
The flat racing season in Britain was disrupted by the COVID-19 pandemic and Kinross did not race again until 6 June, when he contested a postponed 2,000 Guineas at Newmarket. Starting at 20/1, he finished sixth behind Kameko in a field of fifteen. He ran unplaced in his next three starts, before ending the season with a win in the Listed Hyde Stakes under Richard Kingscote on the all-weather at Kempton.

=== 2021: four-year-old season ===
After two unplaced starts in Dubai for new owner Marc Chan, Kinross was gelded before the beginning of the British turf season. In May he won the Group 3 John of Gaunt Stakes over seven furlongs at Haydock Park under Frankie Dettori and followed it up with victory in the Group 2 Lennox Stakes at Goodwood under Rossa Ryan in July. From this point, all his races were over six to seven furlongs, except for his one race in the US. Of another three starts in 2021, his best result was fourth place in the Prix de la Forêt at Longchamp.

=== 2022: five-year-old season ===
Kinross had his most successful season in 2022, winning four of his eight races, including two at the highest level. In June, he made his first appearance at Royal Ascot, coming eighth in the Platinum Jubilee Stakes. In July he narrowly missed a second win in the Lennox Stakes, beaten a neck by Sandrine, before winning his next four races, ridden on each occasion by Dettori. After success in the Group 2 City of York Stakes and Park Stakes, he won the Group 1 Prix de la Forêt at Longchamp Racecourse on 2 October. Two weeks later he was stepped down to six furlongs for the Group 1 British Champions Sprint Stakes at Ascot. Starting as 3/1 favourite in a field of eighteen, he won emphatically by 2 1/4 lengths. In November, Kinross went to the US to contest the Breeders' Cup Mile in Keeneland. Drawn wide, and denied a clear run, he managed to gain third place with a fast finish.

=== 2023: six-year-old season ===
Kinross raced six times in 2023, only once coming outside the first three. His first race of the season was another attempt at the Queen Elizabeth II Jubilee Stakes (previously the Platinum Jubilee Stakes) at Royal Ascot, in which he came seventh. He then came third in the July Cup at Newmarket, ridden by William Buick, before regaining his crown in the Lennox Stakes at Goodwood and successfully defending the City of York Stakes. Attempting a second consecutive win in the Prix de la Forêt, he was sent off odds-on favourite but was narrowly beaten by Kelina. An attempt to gain back-to-back victories in the British Champions Sprint was narrowly thwarted by outsider Art Power.

=== 2024: seven-year-old season ===
Rossa Ryan took over as Kinross's regular jockey as Dettori had retired from racing in the UK. In his only victory of the season, from six starts, Kinross regained his title in the Park Stakes at Doncaster. At Goodwood he was beaten into third place by Audience in the Lennox Stakes and at Longchamp he was beaten three lengths into second place by Ramatuelle, having started favourite in both races.

=== 2025: eight-year-old season and retirement ===
In May, Kinross contested the John of Gaunt Stakes at Haydock, which he had won four years previously, and was beaten a head by Ten Bob Tony. He was then entered in the Lennox Stakes at Goodwood but was kicked by Audience behind the starting stalls and had to be withdrawn with a cut on his foreleg. His jockey said: "I was nowhere near Audience and he kept backing up and just let fly at me. I just want to say a big sorry to everyone involved. It was a bit of a freak thing." It proved to be Kinross's last racecourse appearance; in October his trainer announced his retirement to the living legends section of the National Stud in Newmarket. He had won eleven of his 35 starts and amassed £1,972,389 in prize money.
