= Tattenham Corner Stakes =

Flat horse race in Britain

John Of Gaunt Stakes (until 2025) Tattenham Corner Stakes (from 2026)
- Class: Group 3
- Location: Haydock Park, Haydock, England (until 2025); Epsom Downs, Epsom, England (From 2026)
- Race type: Flat / Thoroughbred
- Sponsor: Betfred
- Website: Haydock Park

Race information
- Distance: 7f 37y (1,442 metres)
- Surface: Turf
- Track: Left-handed
- Qualification: Four-years-old and up
- Weight: 9 st 2 lb Allowances; 3 lb for fillies and mares Penalties; 7 lb for Group 1 winners * 5 lb for Group 2 winners * 3 lb for Group 3 winners * * since 31 August last year
- Purse: £85,000 (2025); 1st: £48,204

John of Gaunt Stakes
2025
Ten Bob Tony	Kinross	Volterra

Previous years
2024
Tiber Flow	Sirona	Pogo
2023
Jumby	The Astrologist	El Caballo
2022
Pogo	Laneqash	Kinross
2021
Kinross	Njord	Glorious Journey

2020-2011
2019
Safe Voyage	Suedois	Snazzy Jazzy
2018
D'bai	Larchmont Lad	Tabarrak
2017
Absolutely So	Jallota	So Beloved
2016
Home Of The Brave	Convey	So Belove
2015
Cable Bay	Ascription	Absolutely So
2014
Penitent	Breton Rock	Eton Forever
2013
Amarillo	Pastoral Player	Red Jazz
2012
Pastoral Player	Majestic Myles	Doncaster Rover
2011
The Cheka	Regal Parade	Doncaster Rover

2010-2001
2010
Main Aim	Doncaster Rover	Dream Eater
2009
Main Aim	Beacon Lodge	Arabian Gleam
2008
Major Cadeaux	Big Timer	Appalachian Trail
2007
Mine	Beckermet	Soldier's Tale
2006
Quito	New Seeker	Cape Columbine
2005
Sleeping Indian	Vanderlin	Desert Fantasy
2004
Suggestive	Makhlab	Three Graces
2003
With Reason	Patsy's Double	Selective
2002
Warningford	Patsy's Double	Lincoln Dancer
2001
Mount Abu	Fath	Late Night Out

2000-1991
2000
Pulau Tioman	Hot Tin Roof	Muchea
1999
Warningford	Tumbleweed Ridge	Wahj
1998
Nigrasine	Jo Mell	Swiss Law
1997
Decorated Hero	Lucayan Prince	My Branch
1996
Inzar	Branston Abby	Carranita
1995
Mutakddim	Carranita	Everglades
1994
Eurolink Thunder	Redoubtable	Storiths
1993
Celestial Key	Band On The Run	Mojave
1992
Norton Challenger	Powerful Edge	Stack Rock
1991
Swordsmith	Norton Challenger	Takaddum

1990-1988
1990
Palace Street	Princess Accord	Marienski
1989
Weldnaas	Always Fair	Mac's Fighter
1988
Wantage Park	Captain Holly	Bin Shaddad

The Tattenham Corner Stakes (formerly the John Of Gaunt Stakes) is a Group 3 flat horse race in Great Britain open to horses aged four years or older. It was run at Haydock Park over a distance of 7 furlongs and 37 yards (1,442 metres), and it was scheduled to take place each year in late May or early June. From 2026 It will be run at Epsom over a distance of 7 furlongs and 37 yards (1,442 metres) and will take place on the Saturday of the Epsom Derby. The race's new title comes from Tattenham Corner, the bend into Epsom's finishing straight.

The event was named after John of Gaunt, the 1st Duke of Lancaster, who lived in the 14th century. It was formerly open to horses aged three or older, and it used to be classed at Listed level. The minimum age was raised to four in 1998, and the race was promoted to Group 3 status in 2008.

The race was sponsored by the Timeform organisation from 2009 to 2016 and was run as the Timeform Jury Stakes.

== Records ==
Most successful horse (2 wins):

- Warningford – 1999, 2002
- Main Aim – 2009, 2010
- Ten Bob Tony - 2025, 2026

Leading jockey (3 wins):

- Ryan Moore – Major Cadeaux (2008), Main Aim (2009, 2010)
- Richard Quinn - Sarab (1985), Eurolink Thunder (1994), Mine (2007)

Leading trainer (4 wins):

- John Gosden – Mutakddim (1995), Decorated Hero (1997), Mount Abu (2001), Sleeping Indian (2005)

== Winners ==
Year	Winner	Age	Jockey	Trainer	Time
1976	Record Token	4	Pat Eddery	Peter Walwyn	1:34.99
1977	Gwent	4	Geoff Baxter	Bruce Hobbs	1:31.35
1978	Persian Bold	3	Kipper Lynch	Tony Ingham	1:32.28
1979	Borzoi	3	Taffy Thomas	Henry Cecil	1:29.92
1980	Hard Fought	3	Mark Birch	Michael Stoute	1:29.41
1981	Last Fandango	4	Pat Eddery	Vincent O'Brien	1:35.04
1982	Indian King	4	Bruce Raymond	Guy Harwood	1:27.21
1983	Abandoned due to waterlogging
1984	Mr Meeka	3	John Lowe	Steve Norton	1:30.46
1985	Sarab	4	Richard Quinn	Paul Cole	1:31.91
1986	Firm Landing	3	Nicky Connorton	Bill Watts	1:30.89
1987	Linda's Magic	3	John Reid	Robert Armstrong	1:34.06
1988	Wantage Park	4	Philip Robinson	Mick Ryan	1:30.54
1989	Weldnaas	3	Shaun Keightley	Ben Hanbury	1:29.43
1990	Palace Street	3	John Williams	Toby Balding	1:32.94
1991	Swordsmith	4	Michael Hills	Barry Hills	1:29.30
1992	Norton Challenger	5	Mark Birch	Peter Easterby	1:30.31
1993	Celestial Key	3	Gary Carter	Steve Norton	1:31.96
1994	Eurolink Thunder	4	Richard Quinn	John Dunlop	1:32.24
1995	Mutakddim	4	Gary Hind	John Gosden	1:28.39
1996	Inzar	4	Richard Hills	Paul Cole	1:33.79
1997	Decorated Hero	5	Gary Hind	John Gosden	1:29.74
1998	Nigrasine	4	Jason Weaver	Les Eyre	1:29.10
1999	Warningford	5	Oscar Urbina	James Fanshawe	1:30.30
2000	Pulau Tioman (Note: One Won One finished first in 2000, but he was subsequently disqualified after testing positive for a banned substance)	4	Michael Roberts	Michael Jarvis	1:33.50
2001	Mount Abu	4	Jimmy Fortune	John Gosden	1:31.27
2002	Warningford	8	Oscar Urbina	James Fanshawe	1:34.67
2003	With Reason	5	John Egan	David Loder	1:29.34
2004	Suggestive	6	Michael Hills	William Haggas	1:29.57
2005	Sleeping Indian	4	Jimmy Fortune	John Gosden	1:30.11
2006	Quito	9	Tony Culhane	David Chapman	1:29.65
2007	Mine	9	Richard Quinn	James Bethell	1:28.88
2008	Major Cadeaux	4	Ryan Moore	Richard Hannon Sr.	1:29.98
2009	Main Aim	4	Ryan Moore	Sir Michael Stoute	1:30.42
2010	Main Aim	5	Ryan Moore	Sir Michael Stoute	1:33.69
2011	The Cheka	5	Tom Queally	Eve Johnson Houghton	1:29.37
2012	Pastoral Player	5	Darryll Holland	Hughie Morrison	1:29.18
2013	Amarillo	4	Andrasch Starke	Peter Schiergen	1:27.99
2014	Penitent	8	Daniel Tudhope	David O'Meara	1:31.31
2015	Cable Bay	4	Jamie Spencer	Charles Hills	1:30.16
2016	Home Of The Brave	4	James Doyle	Hugo Palmer	1:28.77
2017	Absolutely So	7	David Probert	Andrew Balding	1:32.97
2018	D'bai	4	William Buick	Charlie Appleby	1:28.24
2019	Safe Voyage	6	Jason Hart	John Quinn	1:36.23
	no race 2020 (Note: The 2020 running was cancelled because of the COVID-19 pandemic in the United Kingdom)
2021	Kinross	4	Frankie Dettori	Ralph Beckett	1:30.62
2022	Pogo	6	Kieran Shoemark	Charles Hills	1:28.65
2023	Jumby	5	Charles Bishop	Eve Johnson Houghton	1:27.82
2024	Tiber Flow	5	Tom Marquand	William Haggas	1:29.87
2025	Ten Bob Tony	4	William Buick	Ed Walker	1:29.09
2026	Ten Bob Tony	5	Kieran Shoemark	Ed Walker	1:23.79

== See also ==
- Horse racing in Great Britain
- List of British flat horse races
