= City of York Stakes =

Flat horse race in Britain

- Class: Group 1
- Location: York Racecourse; York, England
- Race type: Flat / Thoroughbred
- Sponsor: Sky Bet
- Website: York

Race information
- Distance: 7f (1,408 metres)
- Surface: Turf
- Track: Left-handed
- Qualification: Three-years-old and up
- Weight: 9 st 3 lb (3yo); 9 st 8 lb (4yo+); Allowances 3 lb for fillies and mares
- Purse: £600,000 (2026); 1st: £340,260

City of York Stakes
2026
Notable Speech	Lake Forest	Marvelman

Previous years
2025
Never So Brave	Lake Forest	Maranoa Charlie
2024
Breege	Vafortino	Shouldvebeenaring
2023
Kinross	Audience	Sandrine
2022
Kinross	Pogo	Sandrine
2021
Space Blues	Highfield Princess	Glorious Journey

2020-2011
2020
Safe Voyage	One Master	Queen Jo Jo
2019
Shine So Bright	Laurens	Cape Byron
2018
Expert Eye	Gordon Lord Byron	Arbalet
2017
Talaayeb	Toscanini	Suedois
2016
Nemoralia	So Beloved	Jallota
2015
Fadhayyil	Speculative Bid	Salateen
2014
Absolutely So	Glory Awaits	Glen Moss
2013
Sirius Prospect	Rex Imperator	Switcher
2012
Gordon Lord Byron	Bannock	Dubawi Sound
2011
Doncaster Rover	Majestic Myles	Lechevalier Choisi

2010-2001
2010
Yaa Wayl	Skysurfers	Fravashi
2009
Dream Eater	Confront	Royal Confidence
2007
Duff	Advanced	Racer Forever
2006
Quito	Lightning Flash	Arminius
2005
Arakan	Quito	Babodana
2004
Polar Bear	Welsh Emperor	Vanderlin
2003
Vanderlin	Monsieur Bond	Steenberg
2002
Suggestive	Millennium Dragon	L'Oiseau d'Argent
2001
Priors Lodge	Toroca	Needwood Blade

2000-1991
2000
Late Night Out	Mahfooth	Ho Leng
1999
Fa-Eq	Tumbleweed Ridge	Nigrasine
1998
Bold Fact	Jo Mell	Kumait
1997
Hidden Meadow	Poteen	Imroz
1996
Ruznama	Ali-Royal	Forest Cat
1995
Didina	Foxhound	Peace Envoy
1994
Cragganmore	Arjuzah	Fraam
1993
Tinners Way	Ardkinglass	En Attendant
1992
Reported	Consigliere	Knight Of Mercy
1991
Norton Challenger	Batzushka	Sapieha

1990-1988
1990
Enharmonic	Sheer Precocity	Raj Waki
1989
Magical Strike	Tatsfield	Charbatte
1988
Thaidah	Marbella Silks	Wantage Park

The City of York Stakes is a Group 1 flat horse race in Great Britain open to horses aged three years or older. It is run at York over a distance of 7 furlongs (1,408 metres), and it is scheduled to take place each year in August. It is currently held on the final day of York's four-day Ebor Festival meeting. The race was upgraded to Group 3 level from the 2016 running, having previously been a run as a Listed race. It was upgraded to Group 2 level from the 2019 running. In 2025, the race was promoted to Group 1 status.

== Records ==
Most successful horse (2 wins):

- Kinross – 2022, 2023

Leading jockey (6 wins):

- Pat Eddery – Kampala (1979), Cragador (1981), Reported (1992), Tinners Way (1993), Didina (1995), Priors Lodge (2001)
- Frankie Dettori – Cragganmore (1994), Hidden Meadow (1997), Fa-Eq (1999), Expert Eye (2018), Kinross (2022, 2023)

Leading trainer (5 wins):

- Andrew Balding – Vanderlin (2003), Dream Eater (2009), Absolutely So (2014), Shine So Bright (2019), Never So Brave (2025)

== Winners ==
Year	Winner	Age	Jockey	Trainer	Time
1978	Spence Bay	3	Lester Piggott	Seamus McGrath	1:24.26
1979	Kampala	3	Pat Eddery	Peter Walwyn	1:27.49
1980	Sunfield	3	John Reid	Fulke Johnson Houghton	1:26.84
1981	Cragador	4	Pat Eddery	Harry Wragg	1:28.76
1982	Mirabeau	3	Lester Piggott	Harry Wragg	1:26.12
1983	Able Albert	3	Mark Birch	Peter Easterby	1:27.29
1984	Native Charmer	3	Steve Perks	Reg Hollinshead	1:23.76
1985	Braddells	3	Michael Hills	Jeremy Hindley	1:26.67
1986	Presidium	4	Steve Cauthen	Henry Cecil	1:22.62
1987	Ten No Trumps	4	Walter Swinburn	Michael Stoute	1:25.45
1988	Thaidah	3	Michael Roberts	Peter Walwyn	1:26.31
1989	Magical Strike	3	Walter Swinburn	Michael Stoute	1:23.01
1990	Enharmonic	3	Steve Cauthen	William Hastings-Bass	1:22.81
1991	Norton Challenger	4	Mark Birch	Peter Easterby	1:25.46
1992	Reported	3	Pat Eddery	Mikey Heaton-Ellis	1:23.05
1993	Tinners Way	3	Pat Eddery	John Gosden	1:24.89
1994	Cragganmore	3	Frankie Dettori	Charles Hills	1:22.52
1995	Didina	3	Pat Eddery	Roger Charlton	1:22.20
1996	Ruznama	3	Willie Carson	Barry Hills	1:21.77
1997	Hidden Meadow	3	Frankie Dettori	Ian Balding	1:25.86
1998	Bold Fact	3	Kieren Fallon	Henry Cecil	1:21.31
1999	Fa-Eq	4	Frankie Dettori	Saeed Bin Suroor	1:25.02
2000	Late Night Out	5	Mark Tebbutt	William Jarvis	1:22.24
2001	Priors Lodge	3	Pat Eddery	Richard Hannon Sr.	1:24.16
2002	Suggestive	4	Michael Hills	William Haggas	1:23.32
2003	Vanderlin	4	Martin Dwyer	Andrew Balding	1:22.00
2004	Polar Bear	4	Tony Culhane	William Haggas	1:26.17
2005	Arakan	5	Kieren Fallon	Sir Michael Stoute	1:22.37
2006	Quito	9	Robert Winston	David Chapman	1:26.30
2007	Duff	4	Declan McDonogh	Edward Lynam	1:23.50
2008	Abandoned due to waterlogging
2009 (dh)	Dream Eater; Confront	4; 4	William Buick; Ryan Moore	Andrew Balding; Sir Michael Stoute	1:23.18
2010	Yaa Wayl	3	Philip Robinson	Michael Jarvis	1:21.93
2011	Doncaster Rover	5	Silvestre de Sousa	David Brown	1:23.56
2012	Gordon Lord Byron	4	William Buick	Tom Hogan	1:24.25
2013	Sirius Prospect	5	Robert Winston	Dean Ivory	1:26.84
2014	Absolutely So	4	Oisin Murphy	Andrew Balding	1:22.43
2015	Fadhayyil	3	Paul Hanagan	Barry Hills	1:23.12
2016	Nemoralia	3	Jamie Spencer	Jeremy Noseda	1:22.16
2017	Talaayeb	3	Chris Hayes	Owen Burrows	1:24.08
2018	Expert Eye	3	Frankie Dettori	Sir Michael Stoute	1:23.10
2019	Shine So Bright	3	James Doyle	Andrew Balding	1:21.00
2020	Safe Voyage	7	Jason Hart	John Quinn	1:25.47
2021	Space Blues	5	William Buick	Charlie Appleby	1:22.60
2022	Kinross	5	Frankie Dettori	Ralph Beckett	1:22.97
2023	Kinross	6	Frankie Dettori	Ralph Beckett	1:22.57
2024	Breege	4	Colin Keane	John & Sean Quinn	1:24.09
2025	Never So Brave	4	Oisin Murphy	Andrew Balding	1:22.93
2026	Notable Speech	5	William Buick	Charlie Appleby	1:24.91

== See also ==
- Horse racing in Great Britain
- List of British flat horse races
