= Dark Angel (horse) =

Irish-bred Thoroughbred racehorse

- Racing silks of Mrs J M Corbett & Chris Wright
- Sire: Acclamation
- Grandsire: Royal Applause
- Dam: Midnight Angel
- Damsire: Machiavellian
- Sex: Stallion
- Foaled: 4 April 2005
- Country: United Kingdom
- Colour: Grey
- Breeder: Yeomanstown Stud
- Owner: Mrs J M Corbett & Chris Wright
- Trainer: Barry Hills
- Record: 9: 4-1-0
- Earnings: £341,306

Major wins
- St Leger Yearling Stakes (2007); Mill Reef Stakes (2007); Middle Park Stakes (2007)

Awards
- Leading sire in Great Britain and Ireland (2024)

Dark Angel (foaled 4 April 2005) is an Irish-bred, British-trained Thoroughbred racehorse and sire. He raced only as a two-year-old, winning four of his nine races including the St Leger Yearling Stakes, Mill Reef Stakes and Middle Park Stakes. He was retired to stud as a three-year-old and became a very successful breeding stallion.

== Background ==
Dark Angel is a grey horse bred in Ireland by the County Kildare based Yeomanstown Stud. He was from the first crop of foals sired by Acclamation, a high-class sprinter who won the Diadem Stakes in 2003. The best of his other progeny was Equiano, a dual winner of the King's Stand Stakes. Dark Angel's dam Midnight Angel was an unraced daughter of Machiavellian. She was a female-line descendant of the Irish Oaks winner Agars Plough, the ancestor of many other major winners including Halling, Mastery and Balla Cove.

During his racing career Dark Angel was owned by Mrs J M Corbett & Chris Wright and was trained by Barry Hills at Lambourn in Berkshire. He was ridden in all of his races by his trainer's son Michael.

== Racing career ==
=== 2007: two-year-old career ===
Dark Angel began his racing career by finishing second to Spirit of Sharjah in a race over five furlongs at Newmarket Racecourse on 18 April. Three weeks later at Chester Racecourse he started 2/5 favourite for a maiden race over the same distance and recorded his first success, taking the lead a furlong out and winning by two lengths from Eileen's Violet. The colt was then stepped up in class for the Windsor Castle Stakes at Royal Ascot and finished unplaced behind Drawnfromthepast. On 12 July Dark Angel started a 20/1 outsider for the July Stakes at Newmarket. He led until the final furlong before finishing fourth behind Winker Watson, River Proud and Swiss Franc, beaten just over two lengths by the winner. On his next appearance the colt started 5/2 favourite in a twenty-runner field for the £300,000 St Leger Yearling Stakes at York Racecourse on 23 August. He tracked the leaders before going to the front two furlongs out and won by two lengths from the Richard Hannon, Sr.-trained Gypsy Baby with Drawnfromthepast unplaced.

Dark Angel was moved up in class on 14 September for the Group Two Flying Childers Stakes at Doncaster Racecourse. He started the 5/1 third favourite in an eight-runner field but finished seventh behind the filly Fleeting Spirit. Eight days after his defeat at Donacster, Dark Angel started the 9/4 favourite for the Group Two Mill Reef Stakes over six furlongs at Newbury in which his opponents included the Richmond Stakes winner Strike The Deal and the Sirenia Stakes winner Philario. He led from the start and fought off several challenges in the closing stages to win by a neck, three quarters of a length and a head from Strike The Deal, Berbice and Philario.

On 5 October, Dark Angel was stepped up to Group One class for the Middle Park Stakes at Newmarket. The Gimcrack Stakes winner Sir Gerry was made the 2/1 favourite with Dark Angel on 8/1 whilst the other runners included Tajdeef (also trained by Barry Hills), Strike The Deal, Dream Eater and Achilles of Troy. Dark Angel took the early lead before settling in second behind the outsider Proud Linus. He regained the advantage at half way and ran on well despite hanging to the right and won by half a length from Strike The Deal with Tajdeef a neck away in third. After the race Barry Hills said "I think he'll be a sprinter next year. I can't see him getting a mile but who knows". On his final appearance, Dark Angel was moved up in distance for the Dewhurst Stakes over seven furlongs two weeks later. He led for the first half mile but then dropped away quickly to finish ninth of the ten runners behind New Approach.

== Stud career ==
At the age of three, Dark Angel was retired from racing to become a breeding stallion at the Morristown Lattin Stud in County Kildare.

=== Notable progeny ===
'c = colt, f = filly, g = gelding

Foaled	Name	Sex	Major Wins
2009	Lethal Force	c	Diamond Jubilee Stakes, July Cup
2011	Mecca's Angel	f	Nunthorpe Stakes (twice)
2012	Hunt	g	Shoemaker Mile Stakes
2013	Persuasive	f	Queen Elizabeth II Stakes
2014	Battaash	g	Prix de l'Abbaye de Longchamp, Nunthorpe Stakes (twice), King's Stand Stakes
2014	Harry Angel	c	July Cup, Haydock Sprint Cup
2015	Raging Bull	c	Hollywood Derby, Shoemaker Mile Stakes, Maker's Mark Mile Stakes
2016	Khaadem	g	Queen Elizabeth II Jubilee Stakes
2016	Top Ranked	c	Epsom Handicap
2017	Afareeq	g	Jebel Hatta (twice)
2017	Althiqa	f	Just A Game Stakes, Diana Stakes
2017	Art Power	g	British Champions Sprint Stakes
2019	Angel Bleu	c	Prix Jean-Luc Lagardère, Critérium International
2019	Mad Cool	c	Takamatsunomiya Kinen
2019	Mangoustine	f	Poule d'Essai des Pouliches
2020	Charyn	c	Queen Anne Stakes, Queen Elizabeth II Stakes
2020	Mysterious Night	c	Summer Stakes
2022	Almeraq	c	Queen Elizabeth II Jubilee Stakes, Haydock Sprint Cup, British Champions Sprint Stakes
2024	Al Hudaiba	c	Summer Stakes

== Pedigree ==
Pedigree of Dark Angel (IRE), grey stallion, 2005
Sire Acclamation (GB) 1999	Royal Applause (GB); 1993	Waajib	Try My Best
Sire Acclamation (GB) 1999	Royal Applause (GB); 1993	Waajib	Corvana
Sire Acclamation (GB) 1999	Royal Applause (GB); 1993	Flying Melody	Auction Ring
Sire Acclamation (GB) 1999	Royal Applause (GB); 1993	Flying Melody	Whispering Star
Sire Acclamation (GB) 1999	Princess Athena (IRE); 1985	Ahonoora	Lorenzaccio
Sire Acclamation (GB) 1999	Princess Athena (IRE); 1985	Ahonoora	Helen Nichols
Sire Acclamation (GB) 1999	Princess Athena (IRE); 1985	Shopping Wise	Floribunda
Sire Acclamation (GB) 1999	Princess Athena (IRE); 1985	Shopping Wise	Sea Melody
Dam Midnight Angel (GB) 1994	Machiavellian (USA); 1987	Mr Prospector	Raise A Native
Dam Midnight Angel (GB) 1994	Machiavellian (USA); 1987	Mr Prospector	Gold Digger
Dam Midnight Angel (GB) 1994	Machiavellian (USA); 1987	Coup de Folie	Halo
Dam Midnight Angel (GB) 1994	Machiavellian (USA); 1987	Coup de Folie	Raise the Standard
Dam Midnight Angel (GB) 1994	Night At Sea (GB); 1987	Night Shift	Northern Dancer
Dam Midnight Angel (GB) 1994	Night At Sea (GB); 1987	Night Shift	Ciboulette
Dam Midnight Angel (GB) 1994	Night At Sea (GB); 1987	Into Harbour	Right Tack
Dam Midnight Angel (GB) 1994	Night At Sea (GB); 1987	Into Harbour	Headland (Family: 10-c)
