= Challenge Stakes (Great Britain) =

Flat horse race in Britain

- Class: Group 2
- Location: Rowley Mile; Newmarket, England
- Inaugurated: 1878
- Race type: Flat / Thoroughbred
- Sponsor: Godolphin
- Website: Newmarket

Race information
- Distance: 7f (1,408 metres)
- Surface: Turf
- Track: Straight
- Qualification: Three-years-old and up
- Weight: 9 st 3 lb (3yo); 9 st 5 lb (4yo+); Allowances; 3 lb for fillies and mares Penalties; 5 lb for G1 winners 3 lb for G2 winners since 31 March
- Purse: £125,000 (2025); 1st: £68,052

Challenge Stakes
2026
Never So Brave	Flora Of Bermuda	Time To Turn

Previous years
2025
Beauvatier	Poet Master	Cosmic Year
2024
Topgear	Royal Scotsman	Quinault
2023
Matilda Picotte	Lord Massusus	Audience
2022
Pogo	Sacred	Misty Grey
2021
Al Suhail	With Thanks	Chindit

2020-2011
2020
Happy Power	Pogo	Glorious Journey
2019
Mustashry	Limato	Oh This Is Us
2018
Limato	Zonderland	D'bai
2017
Limato	Massaat	Gordon Lord Byron
2016
Aclaim	Lumiere	Jallota
2015
Cable Bay	Breton Rock	Belardo
2014
Here Comes When	Cable Bay	Breton Rock
2013
Fiesolana	Amarillo	Libranno
2012
Fulbright	Red Jazz	Arnold Lane
2011
Strong Suit	Chachamaidee	Maqaasid

2010-2001
2010
Red Jazz	Cat Junior	Main Aim
2009
Arabian Gleam	Ouqba	Donativum
2008
Stimulation	Cat Junior	Laa Rayb
2007
Miss Lucifer	Al Qasi	Toylsome
2006
Sleeping Indian	Killybegs	Satchem
2005
Le Vie Dei Colori	Sleeping Indian	Arakan
2004
Firebreak	Keltos	Polar Bear
2003
Just James	Nayyir	Arakan
2002
Nayyir	Firebreak	Frenchmans Bay
2001
Munir	Fath	Warningford

2000-1991
2000
Last Resort	Maidaan	Cape Town
1999
Susu	Lend A Hand	Josr Algarhoud
1998
Decorated Hero	Lovers Knot	Kahal
1997
Kahal	Rebecca Sharp	Muchea
1996
Charnwood Forest	Bishop Of Cashel	My Branch
1995
Harayir	Soviet Line	Red Carnival
1994
Zieten	Soviet Line	Arjuzah
1993
Catrail	Robin Des Pins	El Duco
1992
Selkirk	Thourios	Second Set
1991
Mystiko	Only Yours	Volksraad

1990-1988
1990
Sally Rous	Anshan	Rami
1989
Distant Relative	Dancing Tribute	Kerita
1988
Salse	Reprimand	Timely

The Challenge Stakes is a Group 2 flat horse race in Great Britain open to horses aged three years or older. It is run on the Rowley Mile at Newmarket over a distance of 7 furlongs (1,408 metres), and it is scheduled to take place each year in October.

== History ==
The event was established in 1878, and the inaugural edition was titled the First Great Challenge Stakes. It was originally contested over six furlongs and open to horses aged two or older.

The present system of race grading was introduced in 1971, and for a period the Challenge Stakes held Group 3 status. It was extended to seven furlongs in 1977, and closed to two-year-olds in 1985. It was promoted to Group 2 level in 1987.

The race was formerly staged during Newmarket's Champions' Day meeting in mid-October. It became part of a new fixture called Future Champions Day in 2011.

== Records ==
Most successful horse (2 wins):

- Energy – 1882, 1884
- Mephisto – 1886, 1890
- Kilcock – 1896, 1897
- Sonatura – 1900, 1901
- Chacornac – 1902, 1903
- Succour – 1907, 1908
- Hornet's Beauty – 1912, 1914
- Phalaris – 1917, 1918
- Boldboy – 1973, 1977
- Moorestyle – 1980, 1981
- Limato - 2017, 2018

Leading jockey (7 wins):

- Lester Piggott – Princely Gift (1954), Forlorn River (1967), Mountain Call (1968), Abergwaun (1972), Moorestyle (1980, 1981), Salieri (1983)

Leading trainer (6 wins):

- Barry Hills – Asteroid Field (1987), Distant Relative (1989), Last Resort (2000), Munir (2001), Miss Lucifer (2007), Red Jazz (2010)

== Winners since 1900 ==
Year	Winner	Age	Jockey	Trainer	Time
1900	Sonatura	3	Clem Jenkins	Fred Day
1901	Sonatura	4	William Halsey	Fred Day	1:16.80
1902	Chacomac	5	Skeets Martin	Felix Leach
1903	Chacomac	6		Felix Leach
1904	Delaunay	3	Otto Madden	Peter Gilpin
1905	Thrush	3	Herbert Randall	Edward Robson
1906	Rocketter	3	Wiliam Higgs	Sam Darling
1907	Succour	4	Herbert Jones	Captain Robert Dewhurst
1908	Succour	5	Herbert Randall	Captain Robert Dewhurst
1909	Sir Martin	3	Danny Maher	Joseph Cannon
1910	Jack Snipe	5	Wiliam Higgs	Sam Darling
1911	Iron Mask II	3	Skeets Martin	Jack Joyner
1912	Hornet's Beauty	4	William Huxley	Felix Leach
1913	Borrow	5	Danny Maher	Jack Joyner
1914	Hornet's Beauty	6	Freddie Fox	Frank Barling
1915	Golden Sun	5	Frank Bullock	Charles Peck
1916	King's Joker	3	Frank Bullock	Reg Day
1917	Phalaris	4	Fred Rickaby Jr.	George Lambton
1918	Phalaris	5	Bernard Carslake	George Lambton
1919	Diadem	5	Steve Donoghue	George Lambton
1920	Poltava	3	Steve Donoghue	Percy Linton
1921	Sunblaze	3	Bernard Carslake	Atty Persse	1:14.60
1922	Two Step	3	Herbert Jones	Alec Taylor Jr.	1:13.20
1923	Black Gown	5	Ted Gardner	Vanda Beatty	1:17.40
1924	Drake	4	Michael Beary	Harry Cottrill	1:13.20
1925	Twelve Pointer	5	Harry Beasley Jr.	Atty Persse	1:12.20
1926	Diomedes	4	Jack Leach	Harvey Leader	1:11.80
1927	Highborn II	4	Joe Childs	Ossie Bell	1:17.00
1928	Nice Prospect	5	Charlie Elliott	Charles Peck	1:14.80
1929	Reedsmouth	3	Harry Beasley Jr.	Atty Persse	1:13.20
1930	Soloptic	4	Joe Childs	Cecil Boyd-Rochfort	1:13.80
1931	Portlaw	3	Harry Beasley Jr.	Atty Persse	1:14.60
1932	The Divot	3	Bobby Dick	Alfred Stedall	1:13.80
1933	Myrobella	3	Sir Gordon Richards	Fred Darling	1:12.80
1934	Mate	6	Freddie Fox	Ivor Anthony	1:11.80
1935	Bellacose	3	Rufus Beasley	Jack Colling	1:13.80
1936	Solerina	4	Bobby Jones	Harry Cottrill	1:13.40
1937	Ipsden	4	Sam Wragg	Ossie Bell	1:12.20
1938	Old Reliance	3	Eph Smith	Jack Jarvis	1:12.60
1939–44	No Race
1945	Royal Charger	3	Eph Smith	Jack Jarvis	1:12.60
1946	Daily Double	3	Doug Smith	Cecil Boyd-Rochfort	1:22.00
1947	Closeburn	3	Sir Gordon Richards	Noel Murless	1:12.20
1948	The Cobbler	3	Sir Gordon Richards	Noel Murless	1:14.20
1949	Combined Operations	7	Harry Carr	Joseph Lawson	1:14.20
1950	Bob Cherry	3	Doug Smith	Atty Persse	1:14.00
1951	Hard Sauce	3	Sir Gordon Richards	Norman Bertie	1:12.00
1952	Agitator	3	Sir Gordon Richards	Noel Cannon	1:15.07
1953	Parakeet	3	Manny Mercer	Richard Poole	1:14.33
1954	Princely Gift	3	Lester Piggott	Noel Murless	1:14.29
1955	Royal Palm	3	Willie Snaith	Sam Armstrong	1:14.76
1956	Coronation Year	5	Doug Smith	Arthur Thomas	1:15.86
1957	Welsh Abbot	2	Eddie Hide	Walter Nightingall	1:14.47
1958	Logarithm	3	Eddie Hide	Arthur Budgett	1:17.12
Race not held from 1959 to 1966
1967	Forlorn River	5	Lester Piggott	Arthur Stephenson	1:14.11
1968	Mountain Call	3	Lester Piggott	Bernard van Cutsem	1:18.04
1969	Burglar	3	Ron Hutchinson	John Dunlop	1:14.86
1970	Realm	3	Brian Taylor	John Winter	1:14.73
1971	Joshua	4	Joe Mercer	Alec Kerr	1:14.98
1972	Abergwaun	4	Lester Piggott	Vincent O'Brien	1:14.53
1973	Boldboy	3	Joe Mercer	Dick Hern	1:16.02
1974	New Model	3	Pat Eddery	Henry Cecil	1:18.68
1975	Be Tuneful	3	Tony Kimberley	Jeremy Hindley	1:12.70
1976	Star Bird	3	Jean-Pierre Lefevre	Philippe Lallie	Not taken
1977	Boldboy	7	Willie Carson	Dick Hern	1:27.62
1978	Spence Bay	3	Joe Mercer	Seamus McGrath	1:25.50
1979	Kris	3	Joe Mercer	Henry Cecil	1:24.49
1980	Moorestyle	3	Lester Piggott	Robert Armstrong	1:26.93
1981	Moorestyle	4	Lester Piggott	Robert Armstrong	1:26.39
1982	Noalcoholic	5	George Duffield	Gavin Pritchard-Gordon	1:26.11
1983	Salieri	3	Lester Piggott	Henry Cecil	1:24.34
1984	Brocade	3	Greville Starkey	Guy Harwood	1:26.18
1985	Efisio	3	Willie Carson	John Dunlop	1:26.19
1986	Lucky Ring	4	Willie Carson	Dick Hern	1:26.31
1987	Asteroid Field	4	Michael Hills	Barry Hills	1:33.94
1988	Salse	3	Michael Roberts	Henry Cecil	1:27.04
1989	Distant Relative	3	Michael Hills	Barry Hills	1:25.13
1990	Sally Rous	3	Gary Carter	Geoff Wragg	1:25.42
1991	Mystiko	3	Michael Roberts	Clive Brittain	1:22.77
1992	Selkirk	4	Ray Cochrane	Ian Balding	1:22.27
1993	Catrail	3	Michael Roberts	John Gosden	1:27.92
1994	Zieten	4	Frankie Dettori	John Gosden	1:25.89
1995	Harayir	3	Willie Carson	Dick Hern	1:23.79
1996	Charnwood Forest	4	Frankie Dettori	Saeed bin Suroor	1:25.12
1997	Kahal	3	Frankie Dettori	Saeed bin Suroor	1:25.38
1998	Decorated Hero	6	Olivier Peslier	John Gosden	1:25.76
1999	Susu	6	Kieren Fallon	Sir Michael Stoute	1:24.20
2000	Last Resort	3	Michael Hills	Barry Hills	1:26.34
2001	Munir	3	Darryll Holland	Barry Hills	1:27.50
2002	Nayyir	4	Eddie Ahern	Gerard Butler	1:22.69
2003	Just James	4	Pat Eddery	Jeremy Noseda	1:24.68
2004	Firebreak	5	Frankie Dettori	Saeed bin Suroor	1:27.22
2005	Le Vie dei Colori	5	Gérald Mossé	Luca Cumani	1:25.34
2006	Sleeping Indian	5	Jimmy Fortune	John Gosden	1:26.16
2007	Miss Lucifer	3	Michael Hills	Barry Hills	1:25.56
2008	Stimulation	3	Darryll Holland	Hughie Morrison	1:22.48
2009	Arabian Gleam	5	Johnny Murtagh	Jeremy Noseda	1:23.81
2010	Red Jazz	3	Robert Winston	Barry Hills	1:26.04
2011	Strong Suit	3	Richard Hughes	Richard Hannon Sr.	1:22.74
2012	Fulbright	3	Joe Fanning	Mark Johnston	1:24.03
2013	Fiesolana	4	Billy Lee	Willie McCreery	1:24.24
2014	Here Comes When	4	Jim Crowley	Andrew Balding	1:26.53
2015	Cable Bay	4	Frankie Dettori	Charlie Hills	1:24.45
2016	Aclaim	3	Frankie Dettori	Martyn Meade	1:23.92
2017	Limato	5	Harry Bentley	Henry Candy	1:22.24
2018	Limato	6	Harry Bentley	Henry Candy	1:24.87
2019	Mustashry	6	Jim Crowley	Sir Michael Stoute	1:24.91
2020	Happy Power	4	Silvestre de Sousa	Andrew Balding	1:25.11
2021	Al Suhail	4	William Buick	Charlie Appleby	1:24.29
2022	Pogo	6	William Buick	Charles Hills	1:23.83
2023	Matilda Picotte	3	Oisin Murphy	Kieran Cotter	1:25.28
2024	Topgear	5	Stéphane Pasquier	Christopher Head	1:24.50
2025	Beauvatier	4	Alexis Pouchin	Yann Barberot	1:22.52
2026	Never So Brave	5	Oisin Murphy	Andrew Balding	1:22.85

== Earlier winners ==
- 1878: Lollypop
- 1879: Rayon d'Or
- 1880: Thebais
- 1881: Nellie
- 1882: Energy
- 1883: Busybody
- 1884: Energy
- 1885: Modwena
- 1886: Mephisto
- 1887: Kilwarlin
- 1888: Sandal
- 1889: Heaume
- 1890: Mephisto
- 1891: Sir Frederick Roberts
- 1892: St Angelo
- 1893: Dame President
- 1894: Whittier
- 1895: Amandier / Chasseur (Note: The 1895 race was a dead-heat and has joint winners)
- 1896: Kilcock
- 1897: Kilcock
- 1898: Heir Male
- 1899: Fosco

== See also ==
- Horse racing in Great Britain
- List of British flat horse races
