= Park Stakes =

Flat horse race in Britain

- Class: Group 2
- Location: Doncaster Racecourse; Doncaster, England
- Inaugurated: 1978
- Race type: Flat / Thoroughbred
- Sponsor: Betfred
- Website: Doncaster

Race information
- Distance: 7f 6y (1,414 metres)
- Surface: Turf
- Track: Straight
- Qualification: Three-years-old and up
- Weight: 9 st 2 lb (3yo); 9 st 6 lb (4yo+); Allowances; 3 lb for fillies and mares Penalties; 5 lb for Group 1 winners * 3 lb for Group 2 winners * * after 31 March
- Purse: £140,000 (2025); 1st: £79,394

Park Stakes
2026
More Thunder	Flora Of Bermuda	Qirat

Previous years
2025
Marvelman	King's Gamble	Audience
2024
Kinross	Lead Artist	Shouldvebeenaring
2023
Sandrine	Audience	Spycatcher
2022
Kinross	New Energy	Al Suhail
2021
Glorious Journey	D'bai	Laneqash

2020-2011
2020
Wichita	One Master	Molatham
2019
Sir Dancealot	Never No More	Breton Rock
2018
Mustashry	D'bai	Oh This Is Us
2017
Aclaim	Nathra	Home Of The Brave
2016
Breton Rock	The Happy Prince	Adaay
2015
Limato	Markaz	Breton Rock
2014
Ansgar	Aljamaaheer	Gregorian
2013
Viztoria	Lockwood	Gregorian
2012
Libranno	Pastoral Player	Lethal Force
2011
Premio Loco	Dafeef	The Cheka

2010-2001
2010
Balthazaar's Gift	Premio Loco	Himalaya
2009
Duff	Cat Junior	Arabian Gleam
2008
Arabian Gleam	Major Cadeaux	Al Qasi
2007
Arabian Gleam	Duff	Wake Up Maggie
2006
Iffraaj	Somnus	Wasseema
2005
Iffraaj	Sleeping Indian	Court Masterpiece
2004
Pastoral Pursuits	Firebreak	Court Masterpiece
2003
Polar Ben	With Reason	Tarjman
2002
Duck Row	Desert Deer	Tough Speed
2001
Tough Speed	China Visit	Late Night Out

2000-1991
2000
Distant Music	Valentino	Cape Town
1999
Sugarfoot	Wallace	Touch 'N' Fly
1998
Handsome Ridge	Princely Heir	Hornbeam
1997
Almushtarak	Decorated Hero	Samara
1996
Bishop Of Cashel	Bin Rosie	Restructure
1995
Bishop Of Cashel	Nijo	Mr Martini
1994
Soviet Line	Maroof	Eurolink Thunder
1993
Swing Low	Emperor Jones	Mistle Cat
1992
Pursuit Of Love	Prince Ferdinand	Storm Dove
1991
Bog Trotter	Satin Flower	Only Yours

1990-1988
1990
Green Line Express	Sally Rous	Call To Arms
1989
Gold Seam	Markofdistinction	Kerita
1988
Salse	Dabaweyaa	Savahra Sound

The Park Stakes is a Group 2 flat horse race in Great Britain open to horses aged three years or older. It is run at Doncaster over a distance of 7 furlongs and 6 yards (1,414 metres), and it is scheduled to take place each year in September.

== History ==
The event was established in 1978 and it used to be sponsored by Kiveton Park Steel. For a period the Kiveton Park Stakes was classed at Listed level and contested over 7 furlongs. It was promoted to Group 3 status in 1986, and extended to a mile in 1993. The word "Kiveton" was removed from its title in 1996.

The race reverted to 7 furlongs in 2003, and it was upgraded to Group 2 in 2004.

The Park Stakes is held during Doncaster's four-day St. Leger Festival. It is currently run on the third day, the same day as the St Leger Stakes.

== Records ==
Most successful horse (2 wins):

- Bishop of Cashel – 1995, 1996
- Iffraaj – 2005, 2006
- Arabian Gleam – 2007, 2008
- Kinross – 2022, 2024

Leading jockey (5 wins):

- Frankie Dettori - Green Line Express (1990), Handsome Ridge (1998), Iffraaj (2006), Wichita (2020), Kinross (2022)

Leading trainer (4 wins):

- Sir Michael Stoute – The Quiet Bidder (1982), Soviet Line (1994), Tough Speed (2001). Mustashry (2018)

== Winners ==
Year	Winner	Age	Jockey	Trainer	Time
1978	Green Girl	3	George Duffield	Paul Kelleway	1:25.92
1979	Tap On Wood	3	Steve Cauthen	Barry Hills	1:26.35
1980	Known Fact	3	Willie Carson	Jeremy Tree	1:27.77
1981	Kittyhawk	3	Lester Piggott	Dick Hern	1:27.16
1982	The Quiet Bidder	4	Willie Carson	Michael Stoute	1:27.48
1983	Annie Edge	3	Sandy Barclay	Derek Haydn Jones	1:26.90
1984	Sarab	3	Richard Quinn	Paul Cole	1:27.78
1985	Lucky Ring	3	Willie Carson	Dick Hern	1:25.74
1986	Hadeer	4	Tony Ives	Clive Brittain	1:25.66
1987	Guest Performer	3	Cash Asmussen	John Hills	1:26.54
1988	Salse	3	Michael Roberts	Henry Cecil	1:26.53
1989	Gold Seam	3	Willie Carson	Dick Hern	1:27.26
1990	Green Line Express	4	Frankie Dettori	Mohammed Moubarak	1:25.69
1991	Bog Trotter	3	Lester Piggott	William Haggas	1:23.62
1992	Pursuit of Love	3	Ray Cochrane	Henry Cecil	1:23.95
1993	Swing Low	4	John Reid	Richard Hannon Sr.	1:42.79
1994	Soviet Line	4	Walter Swinburn	Michael Stoute	1:37.68
1995	Bishop of Cashel	3	Walter Swinburn	James Fanshawe	1:40.13
1996	Bishop of Cashel	4	Walter Swinburn	James Fanshawe	1:36.85
1997	Almushtarak	4	Ray Cochrane	Kamil Mahdi	1:36.02
1998	Handsome Ridge	4	Frankie Dettori	John Gosden	1:41.02
1999	Sugarfoot	5	Pat Eddery	Nigel Tinkler	1:38.77
2000	Distant Music	3	Michael Hills	Barry Hills	1:38.70
2001	Tough Speed	4	Kieren Fallon	Sir Michael Stoute	1:39.88
2002	Duck Row	7	Richard Hughes	James Toller	1:37.49
2003	Polar Ben	4	Jamie Spencer	James Fanshawe	1:27.58
2004	Pastoral Pursuits	3	Steve Drowne	Hughie Morrison	1:21.66
2005	Iffraaj	4	Philip Robinson	Michael Jarvis	1:23.95
2006 ^{[a]}	Iffraaj	5	Frankie Dettori	Saeed bin Suroor	1:21.98
2007	Arabian Gleam	3	Johnny Murtagh	Jeremy Noseda	1:24.24
2008	Arabian Gleam	4	Johnny Murtagh	Jeremy Noseda	1:26.18
2009	Duff	6	Fran Berry	Edward Lynam	1:24.38
2010	Balthazaar's Gift	7	Philip Robinson	Clive Cox	1:24.30
2011	Premio Loco	7	George Baker	Chris Wall	1:25.93
2012	Libranno	4	Kieren Fallon	Richard Hannon Sr.	1:23.16
2013	Viztoria	3	Wayne Lordan	Edward Lynam	1:25.54
2014	Ansgar	6	James Doyle	Sabrina Harty	1:22.41
2015	Limato	3	Andrea Atzeni	Henry Candy	1:24.98
2016	Breton Rock	6	Andrea Atzeni	David Simcock	1:25.35
2017	Aclaim	4	Oisin Murphy	Martyn Meade	1:25.59
2018	Mustashry	5	Jim Crowley	Michael Stoute	1:23.92
2019	Sir Dancealot	5	Gérald Mossé	David Elsworth	1:23.84
2020	Wichita	3	Frankie Dettori	Aidan O'Brien	1:25.12
2021	Glorious Journey	6	William Buick	Charlie Appleby	1:26.73
2022	Kinross	5	Frankie Dettori	Ralph Beckett	1:25.10
2023	Sandrine	4	Oisin Murphy	Andrew Balding	1:25.46
2024	Kinross	7	Rossa Ryan	Ralph Beckett	1:24.21
2025	Marvelman	3	Oisin Murphy	Andrew Balding	1:24.72
2026	More Thunder	5	Tom Marquand	William Haggas	1:24.31

^{a} The 2006 running took place at York.

== See also ==
- Horse racing in Great Britain
- List of British flat horse races
