= Adam Kirby =

Retired British jockey

Personal information
- Born: Adlington, Lancashire
- Occupation: Jockey
- Height: 5'11

Horse racing career
- Sport: Horse racing
- Career wins: 6

Major racing wins
- British Classic races Epsom Derby (2021); Other major races Diamond Jubilee Stakes (2013); Haydock Sprint Cup (2017); July Cup (2013, 2017); King's Stand Stakes (2016); Prince of Wales's Stakes (2016)

Racing awards
- 4

Significant horses
- Adayar, Golden Horde, Harry Angel, Lethal Force, My Dream Boat, Profitable Supremacy

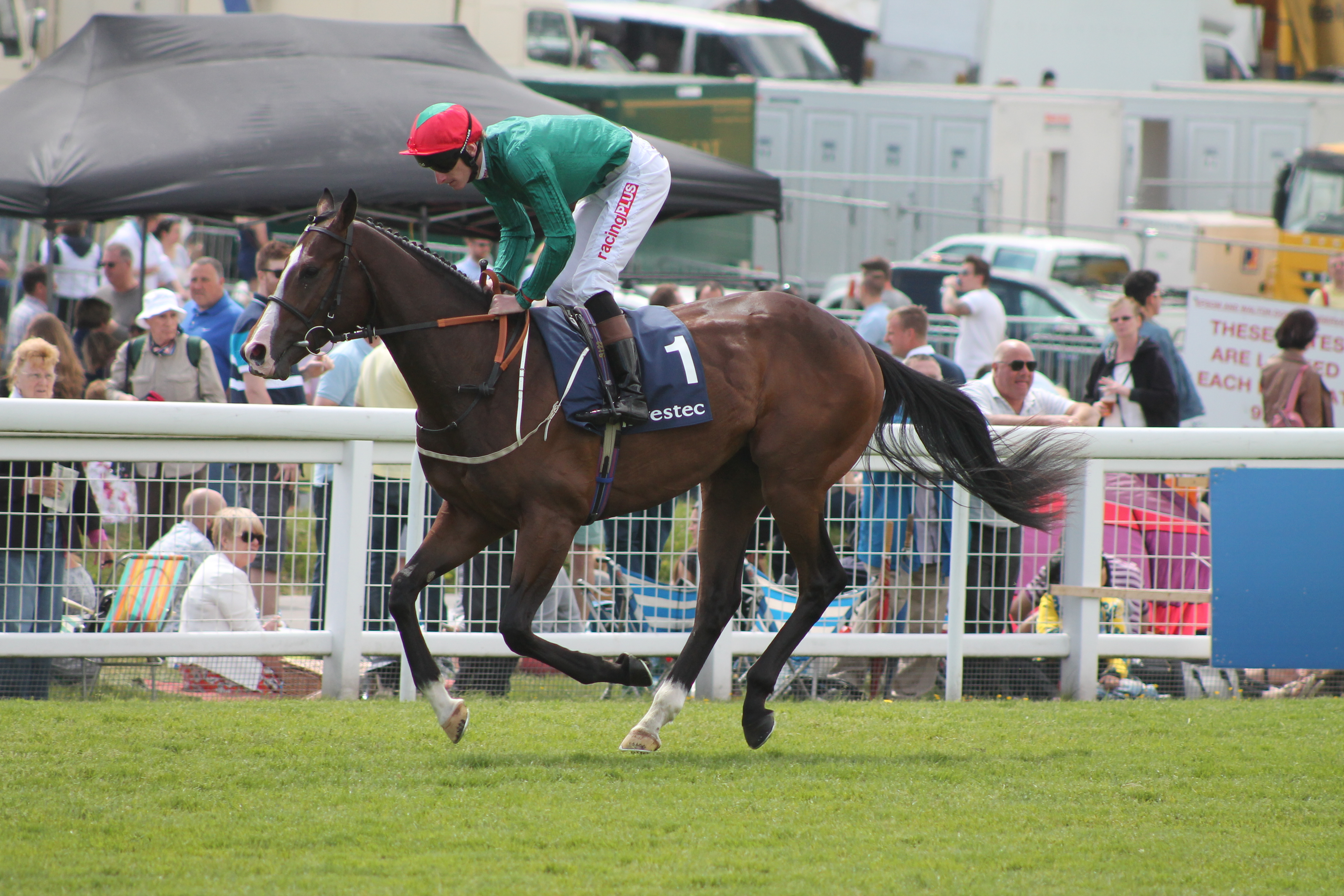
Adam Kirby riding Aleko down to post for the Woodcote Stakes on Derby Day 2015

Adam Kirby (born August 1988) is a retired Group 1-winning British jockey.

He was brought up in Kirtling near Newmarket, on the Cambridgeshire/Suffolk border, where he still lives, and started riding out for James Fanshawe aged 12. He served his apprenticeship with Michael Wigham in Newmarket and won with his first professional ride on Broughton Knows at Lingfield on 1 October 2004.

In his early career, he became first jockey to Walter Swinburn until Swinburn quit training. For Swinburn, he won the prestigious handicap, the John Smith's Cup, at York in 2006. Sprint handicapper Out After Dark also gave him some early big victories, including the 2005 Portland Handicap at Doncaster.

Over the next few years, he steadily picked up more winners. He rode over a hundred winners in both 2011 and 2012, and became the 2012/13 all-weather champion, with 91 winners, after finishing third the previous two seasons. In 2011, he also built a partnership with top-class miler Excelebration, riding him four times and winning two Group 2s.

In 2013, he teamed up with Lethal Force, the horse which took his career to a higher level. Trained by Clive Cox, the grey gave Kirby his first Group 1 win in the Diamond Jubilee Stakes at Royal Ascot. The horse then become one of the sprint stars of the year with an all the way, course record-breaking victory in the July Cup at Newmarket Racecourse, giving Kirby his biggest win to date. The same day he won the Bunbury Cup on Field of Dream.

It would be a few years before he won another Group 1, but in 2014, he won three valuable handicaps - the Lincoln on Ocean Tempest, the Epsom Dash on Caspian Prince, and the Royal Hunt Cup on Field of Dream - and finished fifth in the jockeys' championship.

In 2016, still battling to establish himself among the top jockeys in Britain, he narrowly won another Group 1 sprint - the King's Stand Stakes at Royal Ascot on Profitable, trained by Clive Cox. He missed the birth of his first child in order to take the ride; girlfriend Megan gave birth 45 minutes before the first race. The next day, he won the Prince of Wales's Stakes on My Dream Boat.

In 2017, another Cox horse, Harry Angel gave him two more Group 1s, the July Cup again, and the Haydock Sprint Cup.

In June 2021, Kirby won his first British Classic, the Epsom Derby, on the Charlie Appleby-trained Adayar. The ride came as a late jockey change after Kirby lost his original ride, on the better-fancied John Leeper, to Frankie Dettori, who had become available following the withdrawal of a number of Aidan O'Brien's horses.

He was known for being one of the tallest jockeys in the weighing room.

As of the 29th April 2025, Kirby confirms to RacingTV that he has reluctantly retired from race riding after more than 2 years out of the saddle, citing issues with making racing weight.

== Major wins ==
(United Kingdom) Great Britain

- Commonwealth Cup - (1) - Golden Horde (2020)
- Diamond Jubilee Stakes - (1) - Lethal Force (2013)
- Epsom Derby - (1) - Adayar (2021)
- Haydock Sprint Cup - (1) - Harry Angel (2017)
- July Cup - (2) - Lethal Force (2013), Harry Angel (2017)
- King's Stand Stakes - (1) - Profitable (2016)
- Middle Park Stakes - (1) - Supremacy (2020)
- Prince of Wales's Stakes - (1) - My Dream Boat (2016)
