= King Richard III Stakes =

Flat horse race in Britain

- Class: Listed
- Location: Leicester Racecourse; Oadby, England
- Race type: Flat / Thoroughbred
- Sponsor: Elusive Bloodstock / EBF Stallions
- Website: Leicester

Race information
- Distance: 7f (1,408 metres)
- Surface: Turf
- Track: Straight
- Qualification: Four-years-old and up no G1 / G2 win since 31 August last year
- Weight: 9 st 2 lb Allowances; 5 lb for fillies and mares Penalties; 5 lb for Group 3 winners * 3 lb for Listed winners * * since 31 August last year
- Purse: £35,588 (2022); 1st: £22,684

King Richard III Stakes
2022
Happy Power	Path Of Thunder	Aratus

Previous years
2021
Pogo	Mums Tipple	Beat Le Bon

2020-2011
2019
Hey Gaman	Larchmont Lad	Cardsharp
2018
Emmaus	Donjuan Triumphant	Downforce
2017
Home Of The Brave	Tasleet	Donjuan Triumphant
2016
Home Of The Brave	Coulsty	Here Comes When
2015
Coulsty	Aljamaaheer	Intransigent
2014
Eton Forever	Askaud	Breton Rock
2013
Producer	Aljamaaheer	Burwaaz
2011
Flambeau	Field Of Dream	Side Glance

2010-2001
2010
Spirit Of Sharjah	Carcinetto	Light From Mars
2009
Asset	Regal Parade	Carcinetto
2008
Captain Marvelous	Al Qasi	Eisteddfod
2007
New Seeker	Excusez Moi	Vortex
2006
Etlaala	Philharmonic	Quito
2005
Le Vie Dei Colori	Cape Fear	Polar Bear
2004
Tout Seul	Polar Ben	Rockets 'n Rollers
2003
Tillerman	Gateman	Millennium Force
2002
Warningford	Red Carpet	Atavus
2001
Warningford	Sugarfoot	Mount Abu

2000-1991
2000
Sugarfoot	Tumbleweed Ridge	Granny's Pet
1999
Warningford	Wind Cheetah	Tumbleweed Ridge
1997
Wizard King	Polar Prince	Ramooz
1996
Young Ern	Easy Dollar	Branston Abby
1995
Young Ern	Mistle Cat	Hever Golf Rose
1994
Pollen Count	Mellottie	Branston Abby
1993
Swing Low	Mizaaya	Powerful Edge
1992
Shalford	Norton Challenger	Susurration
1991
Rami	Norton Challenger	Swordsmith

1990-1988
1990
Monsagem	Strike Force	Sharp Reminder
1989
Beau Sher	Alquoz	Chadenshe
1988
Sharp Reminder	Sharblask	Bin Shaddad
1983
Valiyar	Jester	Murillo

The King Richard III Stakes was a Listed flat horse race in Great Britain open to horses aged four years or older. It was run over a distance of 7 furlongs (1,408 metres) at Leicester in April.

== History ==
During the late 1970s and early 1980s, the event was known as the Philip Cornes Trophy Stakes. It was renamed the Leicestershire Stakes in 1983.

Holsten Brewery started to sponsor the race in 1984, and from this point it was called the Holsten Pils Trophy. It reverted to its previous title in 1988.

For a period the Leicestershire Stakes held Listed status. It was promoted to Group 3 level in 1999, and relegated back to Listed class in 2004.

The race was renamed in 2013 after King Richard III, whose skeleton was discovered in Leicester and identified earlier that year.

From 2023, the race did not take place, with the King Richard III Cup (a 1m handicap) replacing it.

== Records ==
Most successful horse (3 wins):

- Warningford – 1999, 2001, 2002

Leading jockey (3 wins):

- Ray Cochrane – Rami (1991), Warningford (1999), Sugarfoot (2000)
- Richard Hughes - Tillerman (2003), Producer (2013), Coulsty (2015)

Leading trainer (3 wins):

- Henry Cecil – Belmont Bay (1981), Valiyar (1983), Monsagem (1990)
- Richard Hannon Sr. – Shalford (1992), Swing Low (1993), Producer (2013)
- James Fanshawe – Warningford (1999, 2001, 2002)

== Winners ==
Year	Winner	Age	Jockey	Trainer	Time
1978	Hillandale	6	Geoff Baxter	Paul Cole	1:29.50
1979	Roland Gardens	4	Greville Starkey	Duncan Sasse	1:32.20
1980	Foveros	4	Kipper Lynch	Clive Brittain	1:25.60
1981	Belmont Bay	4	John Reid	Henry Cecil	1:30.60
1982	Noalto	4	Paul Cook	Frankie Durr	1:23.90
1983	Valiyar	4	Nigel Day	Henry Cecil	1:31.00
1984	Harlow	4	George Duffield	Sir Mark Prescott	1:25.20
1985	Neeyef	4	Joe Mercer	Peter Walwyn	1:25.90
1986	Bollin Knight	4	Mark Birch	Peter Easterby	1:31.10
1987	Flower Bowl	4	Billy Newnes	John Dunlop	1:23.50
1988	Sharp Reminder	4	Tyrone Williams	Ray Laing	1:24.80
1989	Beau Sher	6	Bruce Raymond	Ben Hanbury	1:27.40
1990	Monsagem	4	Steve Cauthen	Henry Cecil	1:24.40
1991	Rami	4	Ray Cochrane	Peter Walwyn	1:25.90
1992	Shalford	4	Brian Rouse	Richard Hannon Sr.	1:24.80
1993	Swing Low	4	Brian Rouse	Richard Hannon Sr.	1:26.10
1994	Pollen Count	5	John Carroll	John Gosden	1:32.80
1995	Young Ern	5	Richard Quinn	Simon Dow	1:21.50
1996	Young Ern	6	Brent Thomson	Simon Dow	1:24.50
1997	Wizard King	6	George Duffield	Sir Mark Prescott	1:24.80
1998	Abandoned due to waterlogging
1999	Warningford	5	Ray Cochrane	James Fanshawe	1:30.30
2000 (Note: The race was held at Doncaster in 2000, and Newmarket in 2001)	Sugarfoot	6	Ray Cochrane	Nigel Tinkler	1:28.60
2001	Warningford	7	Kieren Fallon	James Fanshawe	1:26.24
2002	Warningford	8	Oscar Urbina	James Fanshawe	1:23.00
2003	Tillerman	7	Richard Hughes	Amanda Perrett	1:22.72
2004	Tout Seul	4	Stephen Carson	Fulke Johnson Houghton	1:26.31
2005	Le Vie dei Colori	5	Darryll Holland	Luca Cumani	1:25.15
2006	Etlaala	4	Richard Hills	Barry Hills	1:26.45
2007	New Seeker	7	Ted Durcan	Paul Cole	1:24.22
2008	Captain Marvelous	4	Michael Hills	Barry Hills	1:24.03
2009	Asset	6	Ted Durcan	Saeed bin Suroor	1:22.01
2010	Spirit of Sharjah	5	Frankie Dettori	Julia Feilden	1:22.99
2011	Flambeau	4	Dane O'Neill	Henry Candy	1:21.92
2012	Abandoned due to waterlogging
2013	Producer	4	Richard Hughes	Richard Hannon Sr.	1:25.29
2014	Eton Forever	7	Andrea Atzeni	Roger Varian	1:23.96
2015	Coulsty	4	Richard Hughes	Richard Hannon Jr.	1:22.57
2016	Home Of The Brave	4	William Buick	Hugo Palmer	1:24.60
2017	Home Of The Brave	5	James Doyle	Hugo Palmer	1:22.24
2018	Emmaus	4	Andrea Atzeni	Roger Varian	1:33.54
2019	Hey Gaman	4	Frankie Dettori	James Tate	1:22.27
	no race 2020 (Note: The 2020 running was cancelled because of the COVID-19 pandemic in the United Kingdom)
2021	Pogo	5	Kieran Shoemark	Charles Hills	1:24.08
2022	Happy Power	6	David Probert	Andrew Balding	1:25.03

== See also ==
- Horse racing in Great Britain
- List of British flat horse races
