= James White (financier) =

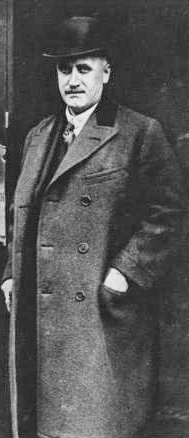
James White in the 1920s

James White (17 May 1877 – 29 June 1927) was an English financier, property developer and speculator. From a working-class family in Lancashire, he worked at a number of jobs before becoming well known in the years before the First World War as a boxing promoter. From that, he moved into property and other transactions, making large sums of money in major deals. He became a racehorse owner and theatre proprietor.

White finally overreached himself financially, and being unable to meet his huge liabilities, committed suicide at the age of 50.

== Life and career ==
=== Early years ===
White was born in Rochdale, Lancashire, the son of Thomas White, a bricklayer, and his wife, Catherine, née Mullroy. He was educated at St John's Roman Catholic School, Rochdale. Little is known of his early career; it is on record that he worked in a cotton mill, and White said in 1925 that when he was 19, he and three others bought a circus in Rochdale, and that he later leased a theatre in Matlock in the adjoining county of Derbyshire.

In 1899, when he was 21, White married Annie Fetton, a worker in the wool industry. In 1900 he went to South Africa to work as a labourer on the railways, returning less than a year later. He became a builder and later bought and sold property and arranged finance for purchasers. In 1908 he suffered a financial failure and was declared bankrupt, although he ultimately paid all his debts in full. The Oxford Dictionary of National Biography records that Annie White died at an unknown date and White married a second time, having a son and three daughters with his second wife, Doris. In fact his first wife divorced him in 1921, a Chancery Court case later establishing that White settled £60,000 to fund an annuity for her.

=== Financial success ===
White moved to London and turned his hand to promoting boxing matches. In 1911 he attracted public notice when a much-publicised match under his management was banned because one of the boxers was black. White threatened to stage the match in Paris to escape the ban. The enormous public interest in the controversy propelled White to the attention of businessmen, politicians and press barons; his influence as a broker of deals grew steadily. In the words of the ODNB, "White possessed the kind of charisma that disarmed critics. With deep-blue eyes, an engaging smile, and a Lancastrian breeziness, he impressed those willing to fall under his spell." The conductor Sir Thomas Beecham, whose financial fortunes became entangled with those of White, described him as "one of that group of financial wizards who appeared and vanished like comets in the sky of the business world during the period 1910–1930".

Beecham's dealings with White came about through Beecham's father, Sir Joseph. In 1914 White persuaded Beecham senior to underwrite the purchase of the Covent Garden estate and market in London. The transaction was incomplete when the First World War broke out in 1914 and public share issues for non-essential purposes were prohibited. Two years later, with the deal still in limbo, White was on the verge of resolving all outstanding funding problems when Sir Joseph died suddenly, leaving a financial tangle that had to be settled by the courts.

In 1913, White was appointed financial adviser to Dunlop Rubber and persuaded the company to set up an American subsidiary, which failed. He also speculated in the Lancashire cotton industry during a brief trade boom, to the detriment of the industry. After the war he returned to property dealing, and was at first highly successful, buying and profitably reselling large holdings in central London and elsewhere. He also bought a controlling interest in Daly's Theatre, where, he said, "he had used every resource to keep up the standard laid down by the late Mr. George Edwardes".

White was a lifelong gambler, and spend a large fortune on racehorses, owing stables and entering runners, with some success, for major races. His best horse was probably Irish Elegance, winner of the Royal Hunt Cup and the Portland Handicap in 1919. During the First World War, he organised entertainments for the American servicemen passing through London, and at troop camps throughout the UK. Together with other donors, he ensured that boxing rings and supplies of boxing gloves were available to almost all Allied soldiers on active service.

=== Financial disaster and suicide ===
In 1927, White overstretched himself financially, and found himself hundreds of thousands of pounds short of the money he needed to meet two concurrent contractual commitments. He committed suicide by poisoning himself at his house King Edward's Place at Foxhill, Wanborough, Wiltshire, near Swindon. He left a note for the coroner, "Go easy with me, old man. I am dead from prussic acid. No need to cut any deeper. – Jimmy." The coroner's inquest found that White was insane at the time of his suicide. Such was White's popularity that more than 5,000 spectators and mourners attended his funeral. However, the financial magazine The Economist commented that by trusting White, "many people in many countries have lost far more than they can afford." Among the biggest losers were White's wife and children, who were left penniless.

== See also ==
- Théodore Vienne
