= Roland Gardens =

British-bred Thoroughbred racehorse

- Sire: Derring-Do
- Grandsire: Darius
- Dam: Katricia
- Damsire: Skymaster
- Sex: Stallion
- Foaled: 9 May 1975
- Country: United Kingdom
- Colour: Bay
- Breeder: Mrs. C. A. Ryan
- Owner: John Hayter
- Trainer: Robert Armstrong; Duncan Sasse
- Record: 16:4-1-3

Major wins
- Horris Hill Stakes (1977, disqualified); Blue Riband Trial Stakes (1978); 2000 Guineas (1978); Philip Cornes Trophy (1979)

Awards
- Timeform rating 116 (1977), 122 (1978), 122 (1979)

Roland Gardens (foaled 9 May 1975 – after 1993) was a British Thoroughbred racehorse and sire best known for winning the classic 2000 Guineas in 1978. During a racing career which lasted from 1977 until 1979 he ran sixteen times and won four races. As a two-year-old he showed moderate form in his first three races before being disqualified after passing the post first in the Horris Hill Stakes. In the following spring he won the Blue Riband Trial Stakes before recording a 28/1 upset victory in the 2000 Guineas. He was beaten in his remaining five races that year and won once in four starts as a four-year-old. He later stood as a breeding stallion in South Africa where he had some success as a sire of winners.

== Background ==
Roland Gardens was a tall bay colt with no white markings bred by C. A. Ryan. He was from the ninth crop of foals sired by Derring-Do, a horse whose wins included the Queen Elizabeth II Stakes in 1965 and whose other offspring included the 2000 Guineas winners High Top, and the St Leger Stakes winner Peleid. Roland Gardens dam, Katricia was a sprinter who went on the produce Anjuli, the dam of the Cartier Racing Award winner Kooyonga.

As a yearling, Roland Gardens was offered for sale and bought for the modest sum of 3,200 guineas. The colt entered the ownership of John Hayter and was sent into training with Robert Armstrong at Newmarket, Suffolk.

== Racing career ==
=== 1977: two-year-old season ===
In 1977, Roland Gardens finished unplaced in his first two races and then won the Knole Stakes, a minor event over seven furlongs at Lingfield Park in September, beating Sunday Morning by two lengths. In October, the colt was moved up in class for the Group Three Horris Hill Stakes over seven furlongs at Newbury Racecourse. Ridden by Geoff Baxter, he appeared to relish the soft ground and moved up on the outside in the straight to take the lead from the more fancied runners Derrylin and Persian Bold. In the closing stages, he veered to the left, away from Baxter's whip bumping Derrylin who in turn collided with Persian Bold. He crossed the line half a length ahead of his two rivals who dead-heated for second place. After an inquiry by the racecourse stewards, Roland Gardens was disqualified and placed third.

At the end of the year a quarter share in the colt was bought by Tim Sasse who had him moved to the stable of his son Duncan.

=== 1978: three-year-old season ===
Roland Gardens began his three-year-old season in March, when he finished third to Camden Town and Roscoe Blake in the Roseberry Stakes over one mile at Stockton-on-Tees Racecourse. Three weeks later, in the Blue Riband Trial Stakes over 8 1/2 furlongs at Epsom Downs Racecourse, he took the lead at Tattenham Corner and held off the challenge of Royal Pinnacle to record his first Group race victory. On his next appearance, Roland Gardens was one of nineteen colts to contest the 171st running of the 2000 Guineas over the Rowley mile course at Newmarket Racecourse. Ridden by Frankie Durr, he started a 28/1 outsider in a race run on soft ground after several days of heavy rain. He was towards of the rear of the field as Tumbledownwind set a strong pace, before making steady progress in the centre of the wide Newmarket straight. He took the lead inside in the final furlong and accelerated away to win by one and half lengths from Remainder Man despite veering sharply to the right in the closing stages. Weth Nan and Tumbledownwind finished third and fourth with the favourite Try My Best finishing last.

In the 199th running of the Derby Stakes at Epsom, Roland Gardens started at odds of 25/1, his pedigree having given him little prospect of staying the one and a half mile distance. He finished eighth of the twenty-five runners, nine lengths behind the winner Shirley Heights. He was sent to France later that month and finished fifth behind Carwhite in the Group One Prix d'Ispahan at Longchamp Racecourse. He was dropped in class for his remaining three races that year, but failed to win again. He finished fourth of the ten runners in the Prix Eugène Adam, when he was asked to concede four pounds to the winner Gay Mecene, and then ran third (conceding thirteen pounds to the winner) behind Green Girl and Boldboy in the Kiveton Park Stakes over seven furlongs at Doncaster Racecourse. On his final appearance he was sent to Germany and finished eighth in the Grosser Kauthof-Preis in Cologne.

=== 1979: four-year-old season ===
Roland Gardens remained his training as a four-year-old and ran four times. He recorded his only success in the Philip Cornes Trophy over seven furlongs at Leicester Racecourse in April, beating Skyliner by a length. On the best of his other appearances he finished second to Formidable at Haydock Park in May, after having struggled to obtain a clear run in the closing stages.

== Assessment ==
In the Free Handicap for 1977, Roland Gardens was given a rating of 122, nine pounds behind the top-rated two-year-old Try My Best. He was rated fourteen pounds behind the same colt by the independent Timeform organisation, who rated him on 116. Timeform opinion of the colt's abilities was reflected in their comment felt the worst aspect of his run in the Horris Hill was that he had ruined his handicap rating for the following year. In the following year, he was rated 122 by Timeform, sixteen pounds below the top-rated horse Alleged and eight pounds behind the leading miler Homing. In the official International Classification he was given a rating of 81, fourteen pounds below the leading three-year-old Ile de Bourbon. Roland Gardens was again rated 122 by Timeform in 1979.

In their book, A Century of Champions, based on the Timeform rating system, John Randall and Tony Morris rated Roland Gardens a "poor" winner of the 2000 Guineas.

Duncan Sasse, in a letter to the Racing Post, expressed his view that the horse had been under-rated by Timeform, and that his correct rating should have been closer to 130. Sasse also pointed out that the colt was never able to show his best form on firm ground "as he turned out his front feet like Charlie Chaplin".

== Stud record ==
Roland Gardens was retired from racing as a four-year-old and exported to become a breeding stallion in South Africa. The best of his offspring were the fillies Enchanted Garden and Roland's Song, both of which were named South African Horse of the Year. Enchanted Garden won the Natal Oaks and the South African Oaks and was named South African Horse of the Year 1986, while Roland's Song was the first female horse to exceed ZAR1m in prize money and be named South African Horse of the Year in 1989. He sired two good colts, one of which was also named South African Horse of the Year in 1993, Pas de Quoi, who won the Cape Derby and Champion Stakes. Wild West was South Champion Three-Year-Old colt in 1984 and won the South African Two Thousand and Metropolitan Stakes.

His last known foals were born in 1994.

== Pedigree ==
Pedigree of Roland Gardens (GB), bay stallion, 1975
Sire Derring-Do (GB) 1961	Darius (GB); 1951	Dante	Nearco
Sire Derring-Do (GB) 1961	Darius (GB); 1951	Dante	Rosy Legend
Sire Derring-Do (GB) 1961	Darius (GB); 1951	Yasna	Dastur
Sire Derring-Do (GB) 1961	Darius (GB); 1951	Yasna	Ariadne
Sire Derring-Do (GB) 1961	Sipsey Bridge (GB); 1954	Abernant	Owen Tudor
Sire Derring-Do (GB) 1961	Sipsey Bridge (GB); 1954	Abernant	Rustom Mahal
Sire Derring-Do (GB) 1961	Sipsey Bridge (GB); 1954	Claudette	Chanteur
Sire Derring-Do (GB) 1961	Sipsey Bridge (GB); 1954	Claudette	Nearly
Dam Katricia (GB) 1968	Skymaster (GB); 1958	Golden Cloud	Gold Bridge
Dam Katricia (GB) 1968	Skymaster (GB); 1958	Golden Cloud	Rainstorm
Dam Katricia (GB) 1968	Skymaster (GB); 1958	Discipliner	Court Martial
Dam Katricia (GB) 1968	Skymaster (GB); 1958	Discipliner	Edvina
Dam Katricia (GB) 1968	Anxious Call (IRE); 1963	Whistler	Panorama
Dam Katricia (GB) 1968	Anxious Call (IRE); 1963	Whistler	Farthing Damages
Dam Katricia (GB) 1968	Anxious Call (IRE); 1963	Julie	Denturius
Dam Katricia (GB) 1968	Anxious Call (IRE); 1963	Julie	Justitia (Family 19)
