= Epsom Dash =

Horse race in Britain

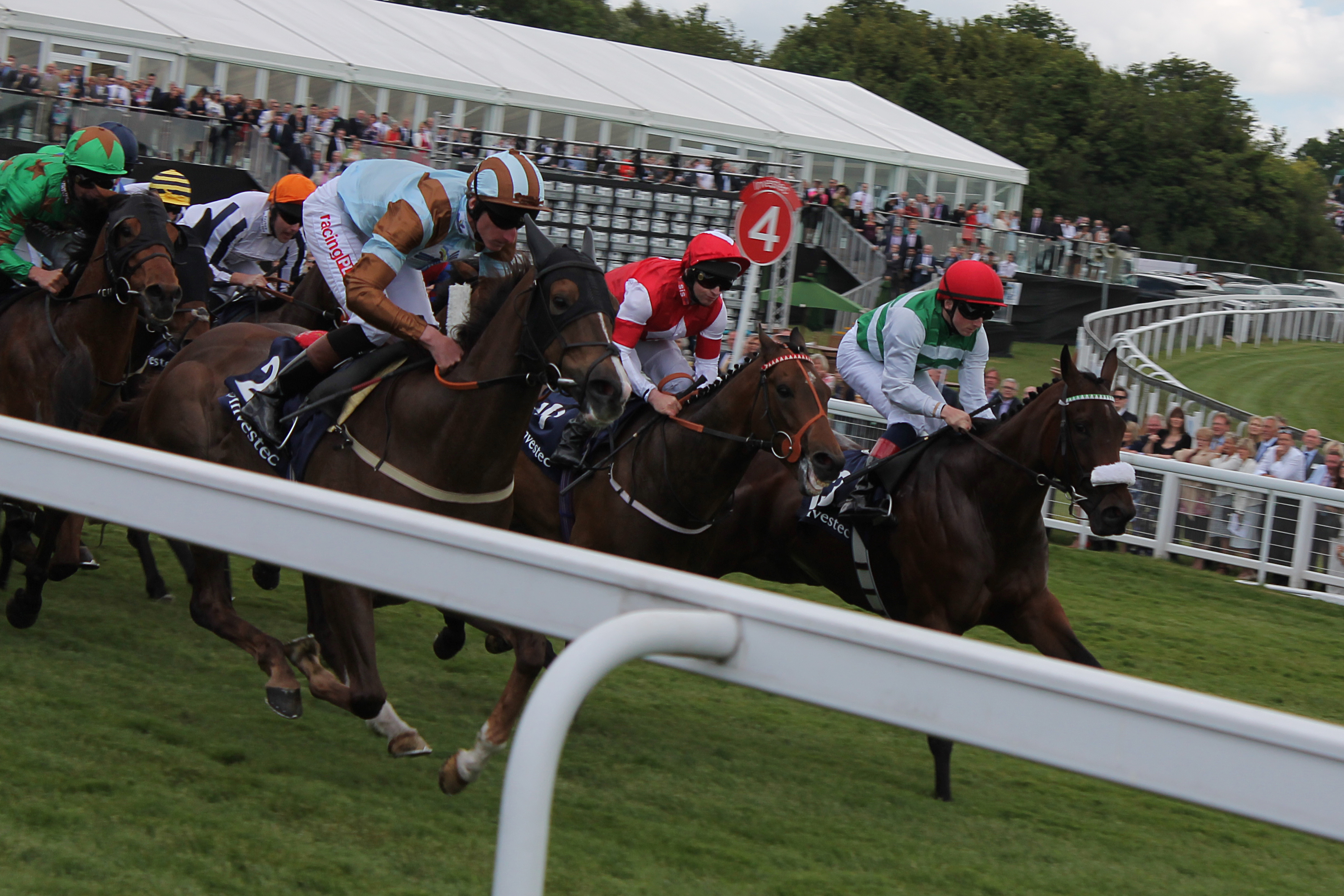
- The 2015 running
- Class: Class 2
- Location: Epsom Downs Racecourse; Epsom, Surrey, England
- Race type: Flat
- Sponsor: Betfred
- Website: Epsom Downs

Race information
- Distance: 5f (1,006 metres)
- Surface: Turf
- Track: Left-handed
- Qualification: Four-years-old and up
- Weight: Handicap
- Purse: £120,000 (2026); 1st: £61,152

Epsom Dash
2026
Arklow Lad	Vintage Clarets	Lexington Blitz

Previous years
2025
Jm Jungle	Spartan Arrow	Existent
2024
Dream Composer	Democracy Dilemma	Looking For Lynda
2023
Navello	Silky Wilkie	Clarendon House
2022
Tees Spirit	Mountain Peak	Equality
2021
Mokaatil	Only Spoofing	Stone Of Destiny

2020-2011
2019
Ornate	Dark Shot	Blue De Vega
2018
Tanasoq	Pettochside	Just That Lord
2017
Caspian Prince	Dark Shot	Duke Of Firenze
2016
Caspian Prince	Kimberella	Duke Of Firenze
2015
Desert Law	Monsieur Joe	Boom The Groom
2014
Caspian Prince	Seeking Magic	Addictive Dream
2013
Duke Of Firenze	Smoothtalkinrascal	Dinkum Diamond
2012
Stone Of Folca	Desert Law	Catfish
2011
Captain Dunne	Confessional	La Fortunata

2010-2001
2010
Bertoliver	Hawkeyethenoo	Rocket Rob
2009
Indian Trail	Captain Dunne	Strike Up The Band
2008
Holbeck Ghyll	Merlin's Dancer	Safari Mischief
2007
Hogmaneigh	Moorhouse Lad	Caribbean Coral
2006
Desert Lord	Bond City	Continent
2005
Fire Up The Band	Peace Offering	Corridor Creeper
2004
Caribbean Coral	Plateau	Tychy
2003
Atlantic Viking	Damalis	Repertory
2002
Rudi's Pet	Watching	Repertory
2001
Bishops Court	Ivory's Joy	Deep Space

2000-1991
2000
Astonished	Proud Native	Repertory
1999
To The Roof	Dashing Blue	Night Flight
1998
Bishops Court	Repertory	Tadeo
1997
Ya Malak	Dashing Blue	Anotheranniversary
1996
To The Roof	Lucky Parkes	Crowded Avenue
1995
Double Quick	Don't Worry Me	Allthruthenight
1994
Mistertopogigo	Tuscan Dawn	Saint Express
1993
El Yasaf	Terrhars	Cradle Days
1992
Viceroy	Farfelu	Ashtina
1991
Mertola's Pet	Viceroy	Gallant Hope

1990-1987
1990
Miami Banker	Joe Sugden	Pussy Foot
1989
Gallant Hope	Ski Captain	Restless Don
1988
Durham Place	In Fact	Cronk's Quality
1987
Clantime	Farmer Jock	In Fact

The Epsom Dash is a flat handicap horse race in Great Britain open to horses aged three years or older. It is run at Epsom over a distance of 5 furlongs (1,006 metres), and it is scheduled to take place each year in early June.

The Epsom five furlongs course, which is downhill until the last 100 yards, is reputed to be the fastest of its kind in the world. The current world record for five furlongs, 53.69 seconds, was set by Stone of Folca in this race in 2012.

The race was known as the Night Rider Handicap until 1993.

== Winners ==
Year	Winner	Age	Weight	Jockey	Trainer	Time
1970	Raffingora	5	10-00	Lester Piggott	Bill Marshall	0:53.89
1971	Constans	6	08-06	Lester Piggott	Jeremy Tree	0:55.91
1972	Trillium	6	07-11	Pat Eddery	Gavin Pritchard-Gordon	0:56.22
1973	Workboy	4	09-09	Lester Piggott	Mick Easterby	0:55.54
1974	Cock Of The Walk	6	07-09	Bob Weaver	Monty Stevens	0:57.15
1975	Vingt-Huit	3	07-05	Compton Rodrigues	John Sutcliffe	0:55.00
1976	Overtown	4	09-09	Frankie Durr	Bob Turnell	0:55.84
1977	Amun 'Ra	4	09-06	Pat Eddery	Denys Smith	0:57.39
1978	Van Laser	4	07-07	J Deegan	Matt McCourt	0:55.85
1979	Ahonoora	4	09-01	Greville Starkey	Frankie Durr	0:57.83
1980	Susarma	4	09-10	Lester Piggott	Scobie Breasley	0:55.67
1981	Dafydd	5	08-05	Bryn Crossley	Steve Norton	0:57.42
1982	Steel Charger	5	09-02	Lester Piggott	Ron Boss	0:54.96
1983	Little Starchy	5	08-06	Richard Fox	J O'Donoghue	0:57.74
1984	Little Starchy	6	09-05	Brian Rouse	Peter Ashworth	0:57.52
1985	Chaplin's Club	5	08-12	Walter Swinburn	David Chapman	0:56.30
1986	Clantime	5	09-00	Dean McKeown	Richard Whitaker	0:56.09
1987	Clantime	6	09-12	Willie Carson	Richard Whitaker	0:55.33
1988	Durham Place	6	07-12	Willie Carson	Kim Brassey	0:55.59
1989	Gallant Hope	7	07-10	Bill Shoemaker	Gerald Cottrell	0:54.89
1990	Miami Banker	4	09-10	Michael Roberts	P J Arthur	0:56.22
1991	Mertola's Pet	5	07-07	Nicky Carlisle	Gerald Cottrell	0:54.28
1992	Viceroy	5	09-01	Ray Cochrane	Ben Beasley	0:55.68
1993	El Yasaf	5	10-01	Darryll Holland	T J Naughton	0:56.00
1994	Mistertopogigo	4	08-05	Alan Munro	Ben Beasley	0:54.79
1995	Double Quick	3	07-08	Jason Weaver	Mark Johnston	0:53.86
1996	To The Roof	4	08-03	Gary Hind	Peter Harris	0:54.21
1997	Ya Malak	6	09-02	Alex Greaves	David Nicholls	0:55.17
1998	Bishops Court	4	09-02	Jimmy Fortune	Lynda Ramsden	0:55.17
1999	To The Roof	7	09-01	Jimmy Fortune	Peter Harris	0:55.66
2000	Astonished	4	09-02	Kieren Fallon	John Hammond	0:55.59
2001	Bishops Court	7	09-04	Robert Winston	Lynda Ramsden	0:54.67
2002	Rudi's Pet	8	08-07	Adrian Nicholls	David Nicholls	0:56.68
2003	Atlantic Viking	8	08-07	Seb Sanders	David Nicholls	0:54.29
2004	Caribbean Coral	5	09-05	Robert Winston	John Quinn	0:54.86
2005	Fire Up The Band	6	09-09	Richard Hughes	David Nicholls	0:56.05
2006	Desert Lord	6	08-08	Darragh O'Donohoe	Kevin Ryan	0:54.49
2007	Hogmaneigh	4	09-04	Saleem Golam	Stuart Williams	0:55:16
2008	Holbeck Ghyll	6	08-07	William Buick	Andrew Balding	0:55.33
2009	Indian Trail	9	08-02	P M Quinn	David Nicholls	0:56.67
2010	Bertoliver	6	08-06	Jack Mitchell	Stuart Williams	0:54.22
2011	Captain Dunne	6	09-10	David Allan	Tim Easterby	0:54.30
2012	Stone Of Folca	4	08-12	Luke Morris	John Best	0:53.69
2013	Duke Of Firenze	4	09-00	Ryan Moore	Sir Michael Stoute	0:55.22
2014	Caspian Prince	5	09-00	Adam Kirby	A W Carroll	0:54.75
2015	Desert Law	7	08-05	Martin Lane	P T Midgley	0:54.65
2016	Caspian Prince	7	09-10	Robert Winston	Dean Ivory	0:55.99
2017	Caspian Prince	8	09-08	Tom Eaves	Tony Coyle	0:54.92
2018	Tanasoq	5	08-00	Paul Midgley	James Sullivan	0:54.96
2019	Ornate	6	08-13	Phil Dennis	David Griffiths	0:54.00
	no race 2020 (Note: The 2020 running was cancelled because of the COVID-19 pandemic in the United Kingdom)
2021	Mokaatil	6	08-04	David Egan	Ian Williams	0:55.63
2022	Tees Spirit	4	08-07	Barry McHugh	Adrian Nicholls	0:54.15
2023	Navello	4	08-07	Andrea Atzeni	George Boughey	0:54.23
2024	Dream Composer	6	08-00	Joe Leavy	James Evans	0:55.50
2025	Jm Jungle	5	09-00	Jason Hart	John & Sean Quinn	0:55.68
2026	Arklow Lad	4	08-13	Harry Davies	Michael Appleby	0:57.36

== See also ==
- Horse racing in Great Britain
- List of British flat horse races
