= Royal Hunt Cup =

Flat horse race in Britain

- Class: Handicap
- Location: Ascot Racecourse; Ascot, England
- Inaugurated: 1843
- Race type: Flat / Thoroughbred
- Website: Ascot

Race information
- Distance: 1 mile (1,609 metres)
- Surface: Turf
- Track: Straight
- Qualification: Three-years-old and up
- Weight: Handicap
- Purse: £120,000 (2021); 1st: £64,800

Royal Hunt Cup
2026
Rogue Diplomat	Blue Rc	Indalo

Previous years
2025
My Cloud	Bullet Point	Bopedro
2024
Wild Tiger	Sonny Liston	Perotto
2023
Jimi Hendrix	Sonny Liston	Awaal
2022
Dark Shift	Intellogent	Tempus
2021
Real World	Astro King	Grove Ferry

2020-2011
2020
Dark Vision	Montatham	Pogo
2019
Afaak	Clon Coulis	Raising Sand
2018
Settle For Bay	Afaak	Circus Couture
2017
Zhui Feng	Blair House	Tashweeq
2016
Portage	Librisa Breeze	Mitchum Swagger
2015
Gm Hopkins	Temptress	Chil The Kite
2014
Field Of Dream	Chil The Kite	Steeler
2013
Belgian Bill	Premio Loco	Arsaadi
2012
Prince Of Johanne	Excellent Guest	Don't Call Me
2011
Julienas	Dance And Dance	Invisible Man

2010-2001
2010
Invisible Man	Riggins	St Moritz
2009
Forgotten Voice	Huzzah	Mia's Boy
2008
Mr Aviator	Docofthebay	Royal Power
2007
Royal Oath	Flipando	Vortex
2006
Cesare	Stronghold	Akona Matata
2005
New Seeker	Ballast	Azarole
2004
Mine	Able Baker Charlie	Zonergem
2003
Macadamia	Camp Commander	Tough Love
2002
Norton	Invader	Beauchamp Pilot
2001
Surprise Encounter	Big Future	Muchea

2000-1991
2000
Caribbean Monarch	John Ferneley	Persiano
1999
Showboat	Plan-B	Refuse To Lose
1998
Refuse To Lose	Fly To The Stars	Prince of My Heart
1997
Red Robbo	Crown Court	Cadeaux Tryst
1996
Yeast	Tertium	Crumpton Hill
1995
Realities	Darnay	Indian Fly
1994
Face North	Lower Egypt	Sharp Review
1993
Imperial Ballet	Royal Seaton	Philidor
1992
Colour Sergeant	Gymcrak Premiere	Dorset Duke
1991
Eurolink The Lad	Operation Wolf	Pontenuovo

1990-1983
1990
Pontenuovo	Curtain Call	Pride Of Araby
1989
True Panache	Wood Dancer	Cuvee Charlie
1988
Governorship	Ghadbbaan	Burkan
1987
Vague Shot	Granny's Bank	Gold Prospect
1986
Patriach	Siyah Kalem	King's Head
1985
Come on the Blues	Advance	Scoutsmistake
1983
Mighty Fly	Fandangle	Christmas Cottage

The Royal Hunt Cup is a flat handicap horse race in Great Britain open to horses aged three years or older. It is run at Ascot over a distance of 1 mile (1,609 metres), and it is scheduled to take place each year in June.

== History ==
The event was established in 1843, and it was originally contested on a right-handed course over 7 furlongs and 166 yards. The inaugural running was won by Knight of the Whistle, with a triple dead-heat for second between Bourra Tomacha, Epaulette, and Garry Owen.

The race's distance was shortened to 7 furlongs and 155 yards in 1930, and it was extended to its present length in 1956. It is now run on a straight course, and it usually features a large field.

The Royal Hunt Cup is currently held on the second day of the five-day Royal Ascot meeting. It is one of three perpetual trophies at the meeting, along with the Gold Cup and the Queen's Vase, which can be kept permanently by the winning owners.

== Records ==
Most successful horse (2 wins):

- Master Vote – 1947, 1948

Leading jockey (4 wins):

- Charles Wood – Thuringian Prince (1875), The Mandarin (1879), Elzevir (1883), Gay Hermit (1887)
- Lester Piggott – Spaniard's Close (1963), Casabianca (1965), Kamundu (1969), Jumping Hill (1976)

Leading trainer (5 wins):

- James Jewitt – Sweetbread (1882), Elzevir (1883), Shillelagh (1888), Suspender (1892), Knight of the Thistle (1897)

== Winners since 1900 ==
- Weights given in stones and pounds.

Year	Winner	Age	Weight	Jockey	Trainer	SP	Time
1900	Royal Flush	7	7-00	Johnny Reiff	Enoch Wishard	14/1	
1901	Stealaway	4	6-07	Joe Childs	George Chaloner	4/1 F	
1902	Solicitor	4	7-04	Sam Loates	Philip Greusil	9/1	1:44.20
1903	Kunstler	5	7-05	John Watts Jr.	Alfred Hayhoe	33/1	
1904	Csardas	5	7-05	George McCall	Joe Cannon	10/1	1:43.60
1905	Andover	4	8-00	Barry Lynham	Sandy Braime	10/1	1:41.40
1906	Dinneford	4	7-08	Otto Madden	Alec Taylor Jr.	100/15 JF	1:40.40
1907	Lally	4	8-00	Leslie Hewitt	Lewis	100/6	1:42.40
1908	Billy The Verger	4	6-13	Richard Crisp	Lawrence Rooney	100/9	1:39.60
1909	Dark Ronald	4	7-02	William H Williams	James Clement	4/1 F	1:39.20
1910	Bachelor's Double	4	8-04	Charlie Trigg	Atty Persse	5/1 F	1:40.00
1911	Moscato	5	7-02	Fred Sharpe	Alec Taylor Jr.	100/6	1:37.80
1912	Eton Boy	4	7-10	Charlie Trigg	Carter	100/12 JF	1:41.60
1913	Long Set	6	9-01	Billy Higgs	James Batho	100/7	1:38.60
1914	Lie-A-Bed	3	6-00	Kenneth Robertson	J East	25/1	1:39.20
1915-18	No Race						
1919	Irish Elegance	4	9-11	Fred Templeman	Harry Cottrill	7/1 JF	1:37.60
1920	Square Measure	5	8-00	Steve Donoghue	John Rogers	8/1	1:38.20
1921	Illuminator	4	7-06	Reginald Stokes	Charles Nugent	50/1	1:36.40
1922	Varzy	4	7-00	Robert Lynch	Ralph Moreton	20/1	1:36.80
1923	Weathervane	4	6-12	Staff Ingham	Richard Marsh	20/1	1:39.00
1924	Dinkie	4	6-10	William Alford	Walter Earl	50/1	1:41.60
1925	Cockpit	4	7-06	Albert Orme	Samuel Pickering	100/6	1:38.00
1926	Cross Bow	4	9-00	Bobby Jones	Alec Taylor Jr.	33/1	1:44.80
1927	Asterus	4	8-13	Charlie Elliott	Sam Darling	10/1	1:38.00
1928	Priory Park	6	8-12	Bernard Carslake	Charles Peck	15/2	1:40.60
1929	Songe	5	8-11	Harry Wragg	Ossie Bell	100/6	1:38.40
1930	The MacNab	4	7-08	Freddie Fox	Fred Darling	100/7	
1931	Grand Salute	4	7-05	Gordon Richards	Tommy Hogg	5/1 F	1:40.00
1932	Totaig	3	7-03	Ben Rosen	George Duller	33/1	1:37.80
1933	Colorado Kid	4	8-05	Cyril Buckham	Victor Gilpin	100/8	1:37.60
1934	Caymanas	4	8-04	Cecil Ray	C Easterbee	50/1	1:40.00
1935	Priok	4	7-06	Stanley Middleton	Percy Whitaker	66/1	1:41.60
1936	Guinea Gap	5	8-05	Bobby Jones	Humphrey Cottrill	28/1	1:38.40
1937	Fairplay	4	8-03	Peter Maher	Percy Allden	18/1	1:39.20
1938	Couvert	5	7-12	Cliff Richards	Herbert Blagrave	100/8	1:38.00
1939	Caerloptic	4	8-12	Michael Beary	Humphrey Cottrill	100/8	1:38.80
1940	No Race						
1941 (Note: The 1941 running took place at Newbury over 7 furlongs.)	Time Step	5	8-09	Fred Herbert	Jack Anthony	4/1	1:25.20
1942–44	No Race						
1945	Battle Hymn	3	7-11	Peter Maher	Cecil Boyd-Rochfort	20/1	1:38.60
1946	Friar's Fancy	5	7-12	Eph Smith	Ted Leader	15/2	1:41.40
1947	Master Vote	4	7-06	Tommy Sidebotham	Herbert Blagrave	25/1	1:39.20
1948	Master Vote	5	8-10	Rae Johnstone	Herbert Blagrave	100/7	1:40.80
1949	Sterope	4	8-12	Joseph Caldwell	Rufus Beasley	100/6	1:38.40
1950	Hyperbole	5	8-08	Scobie Breasley	Noel Cannon	10/1	1:41.20
1951	Val D'Assa	4	8-08	Neville Sellwood	Atty Persse	100/6	1:39.20
1952	Queen Of Sheba	4	8-04	Frank Barlow	Atty Persse	100/7	1:41.20
1953	Choir Boy	4	7-08	Doug Smith	Cecil Boyd-Rochfort	100/6	1:43.40
1954	Chivalry	5	8-03	Dominic Forte	Tom Rimell	33/1	1:42.00
1955	Nicholas Nickleby	4	7-09	Willie Snaith	Sam Armstrong	50/1	1:42.97
1956	Alexander	4	8-11	Harry Carr	Cecil Boyd-Rochfort	13/2 F	1:44.68
1957	Retrial	5	8-02	Peter Robinson	Cecil Boyd-Rochfort	100/7	1:40.98
1958	Amos	4	7-01	Peter Boothman	Syd Mercer	20/1	1:41.94
1959	Faultless Speech	4	8-01	Geoff Lewis	Harold Wallington	8/1	1:42.30
1960	Small Slam	5	8-02	Bobby Elliott	Geoffrey Barling	28/1	1:45.55
1961	King's Troop	4	8-04	Geoff Lewis	Peter Hastings-Bass	100/7	1:43.88
1962	Smartie	4	7-09	Joe Sime	R Mason	22/1	1:45.21
1963	Spaniards Close	6	8-06	Lester Piggott	Fred Winter Snr.	25/1	1:49.00
1964	Zaleucus	4	8-02	Doug Smith	Geoffrey Brooke	100/7	1:43.15
1965	Casabianca	4	8-07	Lester Piggott	Noel Murless	100/9	1:43.28
1966	Continuation	4	7-09	Johnny Roe	Seamus McGrath	25/1	1:42.14
1967	Regal Light	4	7-06	Graham Sexton	Sam Hall	100/9	1:42.09
1968	Golden Mean	5	8-04	Frankie Durr	Doug Smith	28/1	1:41.00
1969	Kamundu	7	8-06	Lester Piggott	Frank Carr	7/1	1:43.63
1970	Calpurnius	4	7-13	George Duffield	Bill Watts	33/1	1:40.75
1971	Picture Boy	6	7-13	Jock Wilson	George Todd	11/1	1:50.96
1972	Tempest Boy	4	8-01	Ron Hutchinson	John Sutcliffe	20/1	1:44.05
1973	Camouflage	5	7-09	Des Cullen	John Dunlop	14/1	1:49.79
1974	Old Lucky	4	8-08	Willie Carson	Bernard van Cutsem	8/1	1:42.97
1975	Ardoon	5	8-03	David Maitland	Gavin Pritchard-Gordon	9/1	1:42.49
1976	Jumping Hill	4	9-07	Lester Piggott	Noel Murless	6/1 F	1:41.73
1977	My Hussar	5	8-10	Willie Carson	John Sutcliffe	10/1	1:47.62
1978	Fear Naught	4	8-00	Michael Wigham	Jimmy Etherington	12/1	1:40.42
1979	Pipedreamer	4	8-05	Philip Waldron	Henry Candy	12/1	1:41.33
1980	Tender Heart	4	9-00	Joe Mercer	John Sutcliffe, Jr.	13/2	1:44.11
1981	Teamwork	4	8-06	Greville Starkey	Guy Harwood	8/1	1:41.64
1982	Buzzards Bay	4	8-12	Joe Mercer	Hugh Collingridge	14/1	1:42.22
1983	Mighty Fly	4	9-03	Steve Cauthen	David Elsworth	12/1	1:41.33
1984	Hawkley	4	8-06	Tyrone Williams	Patrick Haslam	10/1	1:40.38
1985	Come On The Blues	6	8-02	Chris Rutter	Clive Brittain	14/1	1:41.76
1986	Patriach	4	7-12	Richard Quinn	John Dunlop	20/1	1:39.55
1987	Vague Shot	4	9-05	Steve Cauthen	Richard F. Casey	10/1	1:46.53
1988	Governorship	4	9-06	John Reid	Charlie Nelson	33/1	1:40.96
1989	True Panache	4	9-04	Pat Eddery	Jeremy Tree	5/1 F	1:40.92
1990	Pontenuovo	5	7-07	Gary Bardwell	David Elsworth	50/1	1:40.18
1991	Eurolink the Lad	4	8-09	John Reid	John Dunlop	25/1	1:42.75
1992	Colour Sergeant	4	7-08	David Harrison	Lord Huntingdon	20/1	1:38.07
1993	Imperial Ballet	4	8-12	Pat Eddery	Henry Cecil	20/1	1:47.40
1994	Face North	6	8-03	Alan Munro	Reg Akehurst	25/1	1:41.46
1995	Realities	5	9-00	Michael Kinane	Guy Harwood	11/1	1:40.08
1996	Yeast	4	8-06	Kieren Fallon	William Haggas	8/1 F	1:39.39
1997	Red Robbo	4	8-06	Olivier Peslier	Reg Akehurst	16/1	1:40.30
1998	Refuse to Lose	4	7-11	Jason Tate	James Eustace	20/1	1:43.21
1999	Showboat	5	8-06	Neil Pollard	Barry Hills	14/1	1:38.59
2000	Caribbean Monarch	5	8-10	Kieren Fallon	Sir Michael Stoute	11/2	1:41.91
2001	Surprise Encounter	5	8-09	Frankie Dettori	Ed Dunlop	8/1	1:40.27
2002	Norton	5	8-09	Jimmy Fortune	Terry Mills	25/1	1:40.31
2003	Macadamia	4	8-13	Dane O'Neill	James Fanshawe	8/1	1:39.87
2004	Mine	6	9-05	Richard Quinn	James Bethell	16/1	1:40.85
2005 (Note: The 2005 running took place at York.)	New Seeker	5	9-00	Philip Robinson	Clive Cox	11/1	1:37.54
2006	Cesare	5	8-08	Jamie Spencer	James Fanshawe	14/1	1:40.62
2007	Royal Oath	4	9-00	Jimmy Fortune	John Gosden	9/1	1:39.78
2008	Mr Aviator	4	9-05	Richard Hughes	Richard Hannon Sr.	25/1	1:39.63
2009	Forgotten Voice	4	9-01	Johnny Murtagh	Jeremy Noseda	4/1 F	1:40.41
2010	Invisible Man	4	8-09	Frankie Dettori	Saeed bin Suroor	28/1	1:37.16
2011	Julienas	4	8-08	Eddie Ahern	Walter Swinburn	12/1	1:38.53
2012	Prince of Johanne	6	9-03	John Fahy	Tom Tate	16/1	1:38.24
2013	Belgian Bill	5	8-11	James Doyle	George Baker	33/1	1:38.68
2014	Field Of Dream	7	9-01	Adam Kirby	Jamie Osborne	20/1	1:37.88
2015	GM Hopkins	4	9-03	Ryan Moore	John Gosden	8/1	1:40.30
2016	Portage	4	9-05	James Doyle	Michael Halford	10/1	1:43.01
2017	Zhui Feng	4	9-00	Martin Dwyer	Amanda Perrett	25/1	1:37.82
2018	Settle For Bay	4	9-01	Billy Lee	David Marnane	16/1	1:39.42
2019	Afaak	5	9-03	Jim Crowley	Charles Hills	20/1	1:42.36
2020	Dark Vision	4	9-01	William Buick	Mark Johnston	15/2	1:38.32
2021	Real World	4	8-06	Marco Ghiani	Saeed bin Suroor	18/1	1:38.04
2022	Dark Shift	4	9-01	James McDonald	Charles Hills	13/2	1:39.13
2023	Jimi Hendrix	4	9-05	Rossa Ryan	Ralph Beckett	22/1	1:39.48
2024	Wild Tiger	5	9-00	Oisin Murphy	Saeed bin Suroor	11/2 JF	1:38.20
2025	My Cloud	4	9-01	Silvestre de Sousa	Roger Varian	3/1 F	1:38.10
2026	Rogue Diplomat	4	9-00	Harry Davies	James Owen	28/1	1:39.24

== Earlier winners ==
- 1843: Knight of the Whistle
- 1844: The Bishop of Romford's Cob
- 1845: Evenus
- 1846: Leaconfield
- 1847: Tragical
- 1848: Conyngham
- 1849: Collingwood
- 1850: Hagley
- 1851: Sir Charles
- 1852: Ephesus
- 1853: The Friar
- 1854: Brocket
- 1855: Chalice
- 1856: Forbidden Fruit
- 1857: Rosa Bonheur
- 1858: Hesperithusa
- 1859: King at Arms
- 1860: Crater
- 1861: Buccaneer
- 1862: Canary
- 1863: Victor
- 1864: Gem of the Sea
- 1865: Gratitude
- 1866: Attache
- 1867: Jasper
- 1868: Satyr
- 1869: See Saw
- 1870: Judge
- 1871: Valuer
- 1872: Ripponden
- 1873: Winslow
- 1874: Lowlander
- 1875: Thuringian Prince
- 1876: Hopbloom
- 1877: Cradle
- 1878: Julius Caesar
- 1879: The Mandarin
- 1880: Strathern
- 1881: Peter
- 1882: Sweetbread
- 1883: Elzevir
- 1884: Acrostic
- 1885: Eastern Emperor
- 1886: Despair
- 1887: Gay Hermit
- 1888: Shillelagh
- 1889: Whitelegs
- 1890: Morion
- 1891: Laureate
- 1892: Suspender
- 1893: Amandier
- 1894: Victor Wild
- 1895: Clorane
- 1896: Quarrel
- 1897: Knight of the Thistle
- 1898: Jaquemart
- 1899: Refractor

== See also ==
- Horse racing in Great Britain
- List of British flat horse races
