= Desmond (horse) =

British-bred Thoroughbred racehorse

- Sire: St. Simon
- Grandsire: Galopin
- Dam: L'Abbesse de Jouarre
- Damsire: Trappist
- Sex: Stallion
- Foaled: 1896
- Country: Kingdom of Great Britain and Ireland
- Colour: Brown or black
- Breeder: 4th Earl of Dunraven
- Owner: 4th Earl of Dunraven
- Trainer: Robert Sherwood Jr.
- Record: 7: 3-1-0

Major wins
- Coventry Stakes (1898); July Stakes (1898)

Awards
- Leading sire in Great Britain and Ireland (1913)

Desmond (1896 – 1913) was a British Thoroughbred racehorse and sire. He was at his peak as a two-year-old in the early summer of 1898 when he won three races in quick succession including the Coventry Stakes and the July Stakes. He never won again and was retired from racing at the end of the following year. He later became a very successful breeding stallion and was the Leading sire in Great Britain and Ireland in 1913, the year of his death.

== Background ==
Desmond was a dark brown (sometimes described as "black") horse bred by his owner, the 4th Earl of Dunraven. During his racing career he was trained at Newmarket, Suffolk by Robert Sherwood, who had inherited the St Gatien stable on the death of his father (also Robert) in 1894.

He was sired by St. Simon, one of the best racehorses of his era who became a dominant stallion, being Champion sire on nine occasions between 1890 and 1901. Desmond was one of only three live foals produced by the Epsom Oaks winner L'Abbesse de Jouarre.

== Racing career ==
=== 1898: two-year-old season ===
Desmond showed very good form as a two-year-old in 1898. On 24 May at Epsom Downs Racecourse he started 4/5 favourite in an eleven-runner field for the six furlong Woodcote Stakes and looked likely to win before being caught on the line and beaten a head by the filly Fairy Gold. A week later he started odds-on favourite for the Summer Breeders' Foal Plate over five furlongs at Manchester Racecourse and won "very easily" by three lengths.

At Royal Ascot on 14 June he ran in the Coventry Stakes and started second choice in the betting at odds of 4/1. Ridden by Tommy Loates, he won the five and a half furlong contest by "a couple of lengths" from the odds-on favourite Blackwing. Two weeks later, with Loates again in the saddle, he followed up by taking the July Stakes (actually run on 28 June) at Newmarket Racecourse, beating the favored Eventail by a neck. His winning performance was described as "a rare display of gameness".

After a break of four months, Desmond returned for the Dewhurst Stakes over seven furlongs at Newmarket on 27 October. Ridden by John Watts, he finished fourth of the seven runners behind Frontier, Caiman and the filly Vara.

=== 1898: two-year-old season ===
As a three-year-old in 1899 Desmond became increasingly temperamental and failed to realise his potential.

He contested the Epsom Derby on 31 May, but started a 33/1 outsider after delaying the state for more than half an hour by his misbehaviour and refusal to co-operate. He finished sixth of the twelve runners behind the 2/5 favourite Flying Fox. On his only subsequent appearance he finished unplaced in the Sandown Foal Stakes over ten furlongs at Sandown Park Racecourse on 19 October.

== Stud record ==
He became British champion sire in 1913. In that year his sons Craganour and Aboyeur finished first and second respectively in the Derby, although the "winner" was subsequently disqualified. His other offspring included The White Knight who won the Ascot Gold Cup twice and Charles O'Malley, who won the Ascot Gold Vase and was the damsire of Blenheim.

Desmond died in 1913 at the age of seventeen.

== Sire line tree ==
- Desmond
  - Earla Mor
  - Tamasha
  - Shanid-A-Boo
  - Farasi
  - Land League
  - Machakos
  - The White Knight
  - Sir Archibald
    - Irish Elegance
  - Declare
  - Charles O'Malley
    - Light Dragoon
    - Legality
  - Demosthenes
    - Amythas
    - Gasbag
    - Statesman
  - Desman
    - Happy Man
  - Hall Cross
  - Lomond
    - Loch Lomond
      - Old Orkney
    - Clackmannon
    - Ben Lomond
    - Lacio
  - Aboyeur
  - Craganour
    - Caricato
    - Beun Ojo
  - Seremond
    - Mollison
  - Marchmond
    - Fanmond
  - Hapsburg
    - Francis Joseph
    - Noble Star
      - Hamstar
  - Stornoway
  - Atheling
  - Limond
    - Limosin
    - Mask
    - Commendation
    - Limerick
    - Veilmond
      - All Veil
      - Rimveil
      - Veiled Threat
      - Velocity

== Pedigree ==
Pedigree of Desmond (GB) (16-c), brown stallion, 1896
Sire St Simon 1881	Galopin; 1872	Vedette; 1854	Voltigeur*^
Sire St Simon 1881	Galopin; 1872	Vedette; 1854	Mrs Ridgeway
Sire St Simon 1881	Galopin; 1872	Flying Duchess; 1853	The Flying Dutchman
Sire St Simon 1881	Galopin; 1872	Flying Duchess; 1853	Merope
Sire St Simon 1881	St Angela; 1865	King Tom; 1851	Harkaway (IRE)
Sire St Simon 1881	St Angela; 1865	King Tom; 1851	Pocahontas
Sire St Simon 1881	St Angela; 1865	Adeline; 1851	Ion
Sire St Simon 1881	St Angela; 1865	Adeline; 1851	Little Fairy
Dam L'Abbesse de Jouarre 1886	Trappist; 1872	Hermit; 1864	Newminster
Dam L'Abbesse de Jouarre 1886	Trappist; 1872	Hermit; 1864	Seclusion
Dam L'Abbesse de Jouarre 1886	Trappist; 1872	Bunch; 1853	Muscovite
Dam L'Abbesse de Jouarre 1886	Trappist; 1872	Bunch; 1853	Diomedia
Dam L'Abbesse de Jouarre 1886	Festive; 1877	Carnival; 1860	Sweetmeat
Dam L'Abbesse de Jouarre 1886	Festive; 1877	Carnival; 1860	Volatile
Dam L'Abbesse de Jouarre 1886	Festive; 1877	Piercy; 1872	Atherstone
Dam L'Abbesse de Jouarre 1886	Festive; 1877	Piercy; 1872	Fair Agnes (Family 16-c)^

*^ Desmond is inbred 4S x 5D to the stallion Voltigeur, meaning that he appears fourth generation on the sire side of his pedigree and fifth generation (via Fair Agnes)^ on the dam side of his pedigree.
