= Irish Elegance =

British racehorse

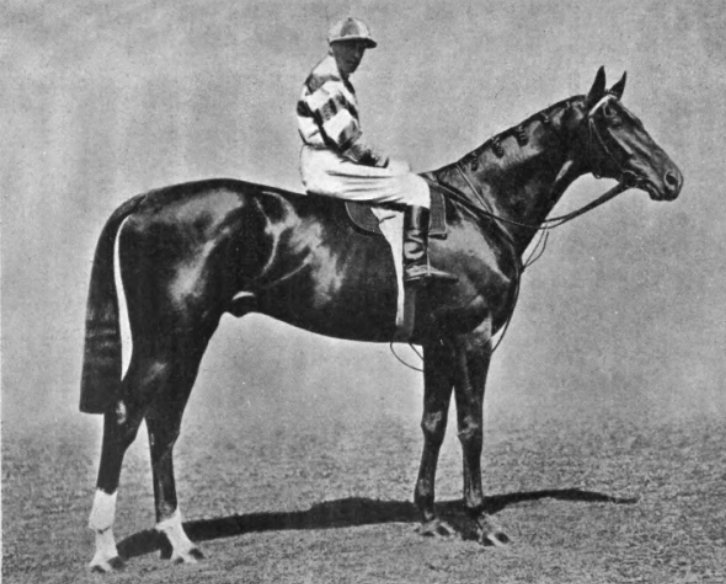
- Irish Elegance photographed by W A Rouch in 1919
- Sire: Sir Archibald
- Grandsire: Desmond
- Dam: Sweet Clorane
- Damsire: Clorane
- Sex: Stallion
- Foaled: 7 March 1915
- Country: United Kingdom
- Colour: Chestnut
- Breeder: A Frogley
- Owner: James White
- Trainer: Harry Cottrill
- Record: 16: 8-3-3

Major wins
- Cambridgeshire Hunt Cup (1918); Royal Hunt Cup (1919); July Cup (1918); Salford Borough Handicap (1919); Portland Handicap (1919)

Irish Elegance (7 March 1915 – February 1940) was a British racehorse and sire. A non-Thoroughbred horse who excelled at sprint distances and carried big weights to victory in major handicap races, he has been described as Britain's "greatest handicapper and second best sprinter" of the 20th century.

== Background ==
Irish Elegance was large, powerful, exceptionally good-looking chestnut with white socks on his hind legs bred by A Frogley and foaled on 7 March 1915. He was not a Thoroughbred: his damsire Clorane was descended from a "half-bred" mare whose ancestry was not recorded in the General Stud Book. His sire, Sir Archibald, won the New Stakes and finished second in the 2000 Guineas. His dam Sweet Clorane also produced Cloringo, a steeplechaser who won the National Hunt Chase Challenge Cup at Cheltenham in 1926. The colt was sent into training with Harry Cottrill who trained at Tarporley in Cheshire before moving south to Foxhill, Wiltshire in 1919. Irish Elegance was named after a variety of tea rose.

As a two-year-old, Irish Elegance did not race but showed considerable promise in training. He was bought for £2000 by Mr Thorburn, who later sold him for £9000 to the financier James White.

== Racing career ==
=== 1918: three-year-old season ===
In June 1918, Irish Elegance ran at Newmarket in the Cambridgeshire Hunt Cup, a wartime substitute race for Royal Ascot's Royal Hunt Cup, and won "in a canter" by two lengths in a time of 1:24.8. He then won the July Cup over six furlongs at Newmarket. In October he finished third of the twenty-two runners behind Zinovia and Dansellon in the Cambridgeshire Handicap, apparently failing to stay the nine furlong distance.

=== 1919: four-year-old season ===
On 14 June 1919, Irish Elegance won the Salford Borough Handicap by six lengths under a weight of 135 pounds. Four days later he carried 137 pounds in the Royal Hunt Cup against 25 opponents. The Royal Ascot meeting on 1919 was said to mark a "revival of pre-war splendour", with a record crowd which included King George V and Queen Mary. Irish Elegance started joint-favourite with the King's horse Jutland and won easily after leading from the start, setting a record for the highest weight ever carried to victory in the race. At Goodwood Racecourse on 29 July he was assigned a weight of 142 pounds in the Stewards' Cup and finished second to King Sol. Irish Elegance was beaten three-quarters of a length by the winner, to whom he was conceding forty-four pounds and appeared to be a rather unlucky loser, having lost ground at the start. By this time he was acknowledged as the best horse in England at distances up to a mile and "the most famous horse of the era".

On 12 September he carried 142 pounds in the Portland Handicap at Doncaster Racecourse. He took the lead a furlong from the finish and drew clear of the field in the closing stages to win very easily by three lengths. After this performance, he was described as "not only the fastest horse of the present generation, but probably the fastest there has been". His rider, the Australian Brownie Carslake said "I have never ridden a horse like Irish Elegance. He gives his rider a grand feel. His action is of the smoothest, as he swings along in a stride that is almost effortless."

== Assessment ==
In their book A Century of Champions, based on a modified version of the Timeform system, John Randall and Tony Morris retrospectively rated Irish Elegance the best horse foaled anywhere in the world in 1915, ahead of The Derby winner Gainsborough. He was also rated the second-best British or Irish-trained sprinter of the 20th century behind Abernant.

== Stud record ==
Irish Elegance was retired from racing to become a breeding stallion, starting at a fee of 200 guineas, despite his non-Thoroughbred status. He was an almost total failure as a sire of winners and struggled to attract top-class mares. One of his daughters, Elegant Girl was the grand-dam of the Champion Hurdle winner Doorknocker. Irish Elegance was euthanised in February 1940.

== Pedigree ==
Pedigree of Irish Elegance (GB), chestnut stallion, 1915
Sire Sir Archibald (GB) 1905	Desmond (GB); 1896	St Simon	Galopin
Sire Sir Archibald (GB) 1905	Desmond (GB); 1896	St Simon	St Angela
Sire Sir Archibald (GB) 1905	Desmond (GB); 1896	L'Abbesse de Jouarre	Trappist
Sire Sir Archibald (GB) 1905	Desmond (GB); 1896	L'Abbesse de Jouarre	Festive
Sire Sir Archibald (GB) 1905	Arc Light (GB); 1893	Prism	Uncas*
Sire Sir Archibald (GB) 1905	Arc Light (GB); 1893	Prism	Rainbow
Sire Sir Archibald (GB) 1905	Arc Light (GB); 1893	Petrel	Peter
Sire Sir Archibald (GB) 1905	Arc Light (GB); 1893	Petrel	Electric Light
Dam Sweet Clorane (GB) 1900	Clorane (GB); 1891	Castlereagh	Speculum
Dam Sweet Clorane (GB) 1900	Clorane (GB); 1891	Castlereagh	Lady Trespass
Dam Sweet Clorane (GB) 1900	Clorane (GB); 1891	May Girl	Victor
Dam Sweet Clorane (GB) 1900	Clorane (GB); 1891	May Girl	May Day*
Dam Sweet Clorane (GB) 1900	Little Twin (GB); 1887	Tertius	Maruis of Carabas
Dam Sweet Clorane (GB) 1900	Little Twin (GB); 1887	Tertius	Little Jane
Dam Sweet Clorane (GB) 1900	Little Twin (GB); 1887	Polpetti	Macaroni
Dam Sweet Clorane (GB) 1900	Little Twin (GB); 1887	Polpetti	Molly Carew (Family: 4-o)

* Irish Elegance is inbred 4S x 5D to the stallion Uncas, meaning that he appears fourth generation on the sire side of his pedigree and fifth generation (via May Day) on the dam side of his pedigree.
