= Saleem Golam =

Mauritian jockey

Personal information
- Born: Mauritius
- Occupation: Jockey

Horse racing career
- Sport: Horse racing

Racing awards
- British flat racing Champion Apprentice (2005)
- Updated on 24 October 2023

Saleem Golam (born Mauritius) is a former flat racing jockey, who was joint British flat racing Champion Apprentice in 2005 along with Hayley Turner. They won 44 races each.

His biggest race victories were the 2007 Epsom Dash and 2008 Portland Handicap on Hogmaneigh for Stuart Williams. However, in general, he struggled for opportunities once his apprentice claim had gone and was forced to seek opportunities abroad.

His final British winner was Robbie Roo in a Class 6 handicap at Wolverhampton on 27 September 2016 and his final runner, the 33/1 Sonnet Rose at Chelmsford on 5 October 2017, which finished 13th of 15. He finished his career in Doha, Qatar and had his final ride there on Giuseppe Garibaldi on 10 January 2019. He had ridden just under 400 winners, with his best season being his Apprentice Championship winning season of 2005.

After that, he enrolled on a barbering course, graduating in August 2020. Of his racing career, he said, "I have zero regrets. Things haven’t been going my way for a good number of years but when you enjoy doing something you will explore every avenue and knock on every door – horses have taken me to 17 different countries and I’ve had a lot of fun.” He added that he could "be happy as a journeyman jockey, getting a couple of rides a day and a winner a week. But when even that becomes unrealistic and it’s one ride every four or five days and a winner every two months the excitement and the positivity is taken away and it can get quite stressful.”

== See also ==
- List of jockeys
