= Portland Handicap =

Flat horse race in Britain

- Class: Handicap
- Location: Doncaster Racecourse; Doncaster, England
- Inaugurated: 1855
- Race type: Flat / Thoroughbred
- Sponsor: Betfred
- Website: Doncaster

Race information
- Distance: 5f 143y (1,137 metres)
- Surface: Turf
- Track: Straight
- Qualification: Three-years-old and up
- Weight: Handicap
- Purse: £100,000 (2025); 1st: £51,540

Portland Handicap
2026
Air Force One	Twilight Calls	Al Shabab Storm

Previous years
2025
Eternal Sunshine	Apollo One	Rosario
2022
Chipstead	Call Me Ginger	Count D'Orsay
2021
Hurricane Ivor	Boundless Power	Count D'Orsay

2020-2011
2020
Stone Of Destiny	Danzeno	Yimou
2019
Oxted	A Momentofmadness	Show Stealer
2018
A Momentofmadness	Encrypted	Wentworth Falls
2017
Spring Loaded	Vibrant Chords	Justanotherbottle
2016
Captain Colby	Humidor	Harry Hurricane
2015
Steps	Harry Hurricane	Another Wise Kid
2014
Muthmir	Bogart	Humidor
2013
Angels Will Fall	Steps	Secret Witness
2012
Doc Hay	Face The Problem	Secret Witness
2011
Nocturnal Affair	Confessional	Addictive Dream

2010-2001
2010
Poet's Place	Bajan Tryst	Deacon Blues
2009
Santo Padre	Everymanforhimself	Captain Dunne
2008
Hogmaneigh	River Falcon	Siren's Gift
2007
Fullandby	Paradise Isle	Pearly Wey
2006
Fantasy Believer	One Putra	Hogmaneigh
2005
Out After Dark	Pieter Brueghel	Continent
2004
Halmahera	Texas Gold	Ptarmigan Ridge
2003
Halmahera	Corridor Creeper	Baltic King
2002
Halmahera	Injaaz	Kier Park
2001
Smokin Beau	Seven No Trumps	Guinea Hunter

2000-1991
2000
Compton Banker	Delegate	Smart Predator
1999
Astonished	Cretan Gift	Ocker
1998
Cadeaux Cher	Nuclear Debate	Ansellman
1997
Dashing Blue	Sharp Hat	My Best Valentine
1996
Musical Season	Sylva Paradise	Lago Di Varano
1995
Hello Mister	Bold Effort	Cool Jazz
1994
Hello Mister	Double Blue	Princess Oberon
1993
Amron	Thousla Rock	Call Me I'm Blue
1992
Lochsong	Venture Capitalist	Cantoris
1991
Sarcita	Baysham	Love Returned

1990-1988
1990
Love Legend	Katies First	Joe Sugden
1989
Craft Express	Farmer Jock	Gallant Hope
1988
Roman Prose	Glencroft	Powder Blue

The Portland Handicap is a flat handicap horse race in Great Britain open to horses aged three years or older. It is run at Doncaster over a distance of 5 furlongs and 143 yards (1,137 metres), and it is scheduled to take place each year in September.

== History ==
The event was established in 1855, and for a period it was known as the Portland Plate. The original course started opposite a coaching inn called Red House, and it featured a left-handed bend at about halfway. The race was later transferred to a straight course.

The Portland Handicap is held during Doncaster's four-day St. Leger Festival, and it is currently staged on the third day, the same day as the St Leger Stakes.

== Records ==
Most successful horse (3 wins):

- Halmahera – 2002, 2003, 2004

Leading jockey (5 wins):

- Brownie Carslake – Irish Elegance (1919), Glanmerin (1921), Tag End (1928), Polar Bear (1932), Rosemary's Pet (1934)

Leading trainer (5 wins):

- Richard Marsh – Lollypop (1876), Marvel (1892), Kilkerran (1897), Lucknow (1900), Dieudonne (1901)

== Winners since 1900 ==
- Weights given in stones and pounds.

Year	Winner	Age	Weight	Jockey	Trainer	SP	Time
1900	Lucknow	5	7-04	Tod Sloan	Richard Marsh	4/1 JF	1:09.00
1901	Dieudonne	6	8-00	Danny Maher	Richard Marsh	11/2	1:09.80
1902	Gladwin	3	6-03	Charlie Trigg	Eugene Leigh	10/1
1903	Nabot	4
1904	Santry	3	7-13	Skeets Martin	Philip Greusil	10/1
1905	Xeny	4	8-12	Danny Maher	John Brewer	100/6
1906	Nero	3	6–05	Frank Wootton	Peter Gilpin	100/8
1907	Woolley	5	6–07	Frank Wootton	James Westlake	10/1
1908	The Welkin	4	7–09	Leslie Hewitt	G Edwards	7/1
1909	Americus Girl	4	8-13	Danny Maher	Philip Peebles	9/2 F
1910	Hallaton	8	8-06	Danny Maher	Richard Dawson	11/2 F
1911	Stolen Kiss	4	8-00	Charlie Trigg	Renwick	100/7	1:07.80
1912	Wethers Well	4	9–01	Steve Donoghue	Jack Fallon	8/1	1:11.00
1913	Hornet's Beauty	5	9-09	Elijah Wheatley	Felix Leach	9/2	1:09.40
1914	Flying Orb	3	7-11	Charlie Trigg	Pat Hartigan	100/8
1915–18	no race
1919	Irish Elegance	4	10-02	Bernard Carslake	Harry Cottrill	9/4 F
1920	Pelops	3	7-12	Vic Smyth	F Hunt	20/1	1:10.00
1921	Glanmerin	5	9-05	Bernard Carslake	Samuel Pickering	6/1 F	1:09.00
1922	Two Step	3	8-10	Herbert Jones	Alec Taylor Jr.	100/7	1:14.40
1923	Polydipsia	6	8-05	William McLachlan Sr.	Etienne De Mestre	100/8	1:08.20
1924	Heverswood	3	8-12	Charlie Elliott	Jack Jarvis	10/1	1:12.00
1925	Diomedes	3	9-02	Jack Leach	Harvey Leader	5/2 F	1:07.60
1926	Sunstone	5	8-00	George Archibald Sr.	Reg Day	100/8	1:09.00
1927	Mayrian	4	6-07	Arthur Wragg	Walter Earl	100/6	1:11.80
1928	Tag End	4	9-00	Bernard Carslake	Charles Peck	100/7	1:06.80
1929	Tag End	5	9-05	Freddie Fox	Charles Peck	2/1 F	1:08.20
1930	Polar Bear	3	8-09	Johnny Dines	Harry Cottrill	10/1
1931	Xandover	4	9-07	Charlie Elliott	Basil Jarvis	11/4 F	1:11.80
1932	Polar Bear	5	8-08	Bernard Carslake	Charles Peck	100/6	1:10.20
1933	Valkyrie	4	7–05	Tommy Barber	Colledge Leader	100/7	1:08.40
1934	Rosemary's Pet	5	8-12	Bernard Carslake	Charles Peck	6/1	1:05.60
1935	Shalfleet	4	9–07	Henri Jelliss	Harvey Leader	8/1	1:09.20
1936	Shalfleet	5	9–02	Henri Jelliss	Harvey Leader	10/1	1:09.40
1937	Carissa	3	8–03	Steve Donoghue	Harry Peacock	100/8	1:09.60
1938	The Drummer	6	7-03	Doug Smith	Billy Carr	7/1 JF	1:09.00
1939–40	no race
1941 (Note: The 1941 running was held at Newmarket over 6 furlongs.)	Comatas	4	8–11	Billy Nevett	Ossie Bell	100/7	1:11.20
1942–45	no race
1946	The Shah	4	7-05	Joe Sime	Bertie Bullock	7/1	1:11.20
1947	Good View	5	8–00	Michael Beary	Evan Parker	100/7	1:08.60
1948	Gold Mist	3	7-12	Cliff Richards	Noel Murless	20/1	1:09.20
1949	Le Lavandou	5	7-07	Percy Evans	Gordon Johnson Houghton	25/1	1:09.60
1950	Paramount	4	8-09	Charlie Smirke	Marcus Marsh	100/7	1:11.60
1951	Reminiscence	4	8-10	Charlie Smirke	Walter Nightingall	100/6	1:10.00
1952	Stephen Paul	4	9–03	Gordon Richards	Atty Persse	100/30 F	1:08.40
1953	Reminiscence	6	8-08	Edgar Britt	Jack Ormston	100/7	1:08.40
1954	Vilmoray	4	9-00	Tony Shrive	Bertie Bullock	100/7	1:11.40
1955	Princely Gift	4	9–04	Lester Piggott	Noel Murless	5/2 F	1:07.80
1956	Epaulette	5	8-02	Willie Snaith	Sam Armstrong	8/1	1:09.40
1957	Refined	3	8-10	Doug Smith	Paddy Prendergast	9/1	1:13.20
1958	Welsh Abbot	3	9-02	Stan Clayton	Walter Nightingall	100/9	1:06.20
1959	New World	6	7-03	Derrick Greening	Toby Balding	25/1	1:06.00
1960	Accompanist	5	7-06	Derek Morris	Freddie Maxwell	7/1	1:09.20
1961	Winna	4	7-02	Cliff Parkes	Harry Wragg	100/8	1:07.80
1962	Harmon	3	8-02	Scobie Breasley	Rufus Beasley	9/1	1:07.60
1963	Marcher	3	8-09	Ron Hutchinson	Dave Hanley	100/6	1:07.20
1964	Comefast	5	7–13	Eddie Hide	J Vickers	9/1	1:08.80
1965	Go Shell	3	8-07	Doug Smith	Bernard van Cutsem	100/7	1:13.60
1966	Audrey Joan	3	7-03	Sandy Barclay	Eric Cousins	20/1	1:07.80
1967	Florescence	3	8–13	Bill Williamson	Frank Armstrong	100/9	1:06.80
1968	Gold Pollen	3	7-07	Ernie Johnson	Ryan Jarvis	11/4 F	1:11.40
1969	Mountain Call	4	8–11	Lester Piggott	Bernard van Cutsem	11/4 F	1:08.60
1970	Virginia Boy	4	7-01	Dennis McKay	Doug Smith	9/1	1:10.20
1971	Royben	3	8-06	Bill Williamson	Scobie Breasley	13/2	1:07.30
1972	Privateer	6	8-01	Eddie Hide	Bill Wightman	8/1	1:09.54
1973	Supreme Gift	3	8-06	Jock Wilson	Brian Swift	100/30 F	1:07.84
1974	Matinee	3	8–11	Frankie Durr	Jack Clayton	10/1	1:11.41
1975	Walk By	3	8–10	Eddie Hide	Bill Wightman	9/1	1:09.96
1976	Hei'land Jamie	5	7–13	Terry McKeown	Neil Adam	20/1	1:10.34
1977	Jon George	3	7–12	Willie Carson	Mick Easterby	11/2 F	1:08.59
1978	Goldhills Pride	4	8–10	Kevan Leason	Tommy Craig	8/1	1:09.13
1979	Oh Simmie	4	7-00	B. Jones	Reg Hollinshead	10/1	1:08.29
1980	Swelter	4	8-02	Philip Robinson	Frankie Durr	8/1	1:10.29
1981	Touch Boy	5	8–11	Tony Ives	Jack Berry	16/1	1:08.55
1982	Vorvados	5	8–13	Lester Piggott	Michael Haynes	6/1	1:09.06
1983	Out of Hand	4	7-03	Steve Dawson	D. Dale	14/1	1:07.50
1984	Dawn's Delight	6	7-08	Lindsay Charnock	Ken Ivory	20/1	1:09.71
1985	Lochtillum	6	8-01	Ray Cochrane	Jamie Douglas-Home	14/1	1:08.71
1986	Felipe Toro	3	8-02	John Lowe	Peter Easterby	11/2 F	1:06.65
1987	Dawn's Delight	9	8–13	Michael Wigham	Ken Ivory	14/1	1:09.32
1988	Roman Prose	3	9-03	Ian Johnson	Les Cottrell	8/1	1:07.29
1989	Craft Express	3	8-09	Bobby Elliott	Mark Johnston	25/1	1:09.78
1990	Love Legend	5	8-07	Alan Munro	David Arbuthnot	12/1	1:09.06
1991	Sarcita	3	8-06	Willie Carson	David Elsworth	13/2 F	1:07.08
1992	Lochsong	4	8–12	Willie Carson	Ian Balding	4/1 F	1:07.78
1993	Amron	6	9-00	Nicky Carlisle	Jack Berry	12/1	1:08.12
1994	Hello Mister	3	8–10	Pat McCabe	Jack O'Donoghue	12/1	1:07.84
1995	Hello Mister	4	8-07	Pat McCabe	Jack O'Donoghue	7/1 F	1:06.62
1996	Musical Season	4	8-05	Kevin Darley	David Barron	33/1	1:07.94
1997	Dashing Blue	4	9–12	Kevin Darley	Ian Balding	10/1	1:06.67
1998	Cadeaux Cher	4	8-07	Ray Cochrane	Barry Hills	20/1	1:09.88
1999	Astonished	3	9-06	Kieren Fallon	John Hammond	11/2 F	1:08.34
2000	Compton Banker	3	8-08	Frankie Dettori	Gerard Butler	7/2 F	1:08.51
2001	Smokin Beau	4	9-04	Matthew Henry	John Cullinan	14/1	1:08.09
2002	Halmahera	7	8–13	Darryll Holland	Kevin Ryan	6/1 F	1:07.23
2003	Halmahera	8	9-04	Frankie Dettori	Kevin Ryan	11/1	1:09.31
2004	Halmahera	9	9–10	Neil Callan	Kevin Ryan	11/1	1:05.64
2005	Out After Dark	4	8–12	Adam Kirby	Clive Cox	14/1	1:07.26
2006 (Note: The 2006 running took place at York over 5 furlongs and 89 yards)	Fantasy Believer	8	8–13	Jimmy Quinn	John Quinn	20/1	1:02.44
2007	Fullandby	5	8–13	P. J. McDonald	Tim Etherington	20/1	1:06.63
2008	Hogmaneigh	5	9-06	Saleem Golam	Stuart Williams	11/1	1:08.55
2009	Santo Padre	5	9-01	Colm O'Donoghue	David Marnane	14/1	1:06.72
2010	Poet's Place	5	9-04	Phillip Makin	David Barron	4/1 F	1:07.79
2011	Nocturnal Affair	5	9-05	Neil Callan	David Marnane	14/1	1:06.69
2012	Doc Hay	5	8–11	Daniel Tudhope	David O'Meara	20/1	1:06.01
2013	Angels Will Fall	4	9-02	Robert Winston	Charlie Hills	16/1	1:08.14
2014	Muthmir	4	9-07	Paul Hanagan	William Haggas	3/1 F	1:05.38
2015	Steps	7	9-07	Louis Steward	Roger Varian	12/1	1:08.79
2016	Captain Colby	4	9-00	William Buick	Ed Walker	6/1	1:06.91
2017	Spring Loaded	5	8-09	Joey Haynes	Paul D'Arcy	12/1	1:06.81
2018	A Momentofmadness	5	9-04	William Buick	Charles Hills	25/1	1:06.04
2019	Oxted	3	9-04	Cieren Fallon	Roger Teal	14/1	1:06.31
2020	Stone of Destiny	5	9-00	Silvestre de Sousa	Andrew Balding	16/1	1:06.67
2021	Hurricane Ivor	4	9–10	Tom Marquand	William Haggas	11/2 F	1:08.56
2022	Call Me Ginger (Note: Chipstead finished first in 2022 but was relegated to second after a stewards' enquiry)	6	8-07	Amie Waugh	Jim Goldie	20/1	1:08.27
2023	Annaf	4	9–12	Rossa Ryan	Michael Appleby	7/1	1:07.53
2024	American Affair	4	8–13	Paul Mulrennan	Jim Goldie	4/1 F	1:06.27
2025	Eternal Sunshine	5	7–13	Lauren Young	Jim Goldie	12/1	1:07.03
2026	Air Force One	5	9-07	Clifford Lee	Geoff Oldroyd	11/2	1:07.16

== Earlier winners ==
- 1855: Manganese
- 1856: Lance
- 1857: Meta
- 1858: The Ancient Briton
- 1859: Tight-fit
- 1860: Tattoo
- 1861: Lady Clifden
- 1862: Queen of Trumps
- 1863: Welland
- 1864: Persuasion
- 1865: Kilkenny
- 1866: Skylark
- 1867: Bounceaway
- 1868: Lady Zetland
- 1869: Argyle
- 1870: Oxonian
- 1871: St Vincent
- 1872: Little Nell
- 1873: Grand Flaneur
- 1874: Genevieve
- 1875: Grand Flaneur
- 1876: Lollypop
- 1877: Rosbach
- 1878: Telescope
- 1879: Hackthorpe
- 1880: Discount
- 1881: Mowerina
- 1882: Martini
- 1883: Lowland Chief
- 1884: Leeds
- 1885: Dalmeny
- 1886: Modwena
- 1887: Lisbon
- 1888: Goldseeker
- 1889: Galloping Queen
- 1890: L'Abbesse de Jouarre
- 1891: Tostig
- 1892: Marvel
- 1893: Whisperer
- 1894: Grey Leg
- 1895: Whiston
- 1896: Grig
- 1897: Kilkerran
- 1898: Eager
- 1899: Mazeppa

== See also ==
- Horse racing in Great Britain
- List of British flat horse races
