= Oxted (horse) =

British Thoroughbred racehorse

- Oxted ridden by Cieren Fallon at Newmarket July racecourse in August 2019
- Sire: Mayson
- Grandsire: Invincible Spirit
- Dam: Charlotte Rosina
- Damsire: Choisir
- Sex: Gelding
- Foaled: 6 March 2016
- Country: United Kingdom
- Colour: Bay
- Breeder: Homecroft Wealth Racing
- Owner: Homecroft Wealth Racing et al
- Trainer: Roger Teal
- Record: 16: 5-3-2
- Earnings: £514,741

Major wins
- Portland Handicap (2019); Abernant Stakes (2020); July Cup (2020); King's Stand Stakes (2021)

Oxted (foaled 6 March 2016) is a British Thoroughbred racehorse who specialises in sprinting. After running fifth on his only start as a juvenile he won a maiden race on his three-year-old debut and ended his second campaign with a victory in the Portland Handicap. As a four-year-old he made significant improvement to win the Abernant Stakes and July Cup. He added a further major success in 2021 when he won the King's Stand Stakes.

== Background ==
Oxted is a bay horse with a white sock on his right hind leg bred in England by his owner Homecroft Wealth Racing, a syndicate which included Tony Hirschfeld, Stephen Piper and David Fish. He was sent into training with Roger Teal at the Windsor House Stable in Lambourn, Berkshire. He was gelded before the start of his racing career.

He was from the third crop of foals sired by the July Cup winner Mayson. Oxted's dam Charlotte Rosina showed some racing ability, winning four minor races from seventeen starts. Charlotte Rosina was a female-line descendant of Myrobella making her a distant relative of Snow Knight, Linamix, Big Game, Chamossaire and Policeman.

== Racing career ==
=== 2018: two-year-old season ===
On his racecourse debut Oxted started at odds of 33/1 for a maiden race over six furlongs on soft ground at Doncaster Racecourse on 10 November. Ridden by Liam Keniry he kept on well in the last quarter mile and finished fifth of the fourteen runners, beaten nine lengths by the winner Dazzling Dan.

=== 2019: three-year-old season ===
Oxted began his second campaign on 28 April at Salisbury Racecourse in a novice race (for horse with no more than two previous wins) over seven furlongs in which he was ridden by David Probert. Starting a 25/1 outsider he recorded his first success as he disputed the lead from the start and won "readily" by 2 1/4 lengths from The Night Watch. When he was stepped up in class for the Listed Carnarvon Stakes at Newbury Racecourse three weeks later he led for most of the way before being overtaken in the final strides and beaten half a length by Khadeem. He then ran sixth behind Waldpfad in the Group 3 Hackwood Stakes at Newbury in July and finished a distant last of four behind Tabdeed in a minor race at Doncaster Racecourse on 3 August. Two weeks later he was assigned a weight of 128 pounds in six furlong handicap race at Newmarket Racecourse and ran second to his old rival Dazzling Dan beaten half a length after finishing strongly.

At Doncaster racecourse on 14 September Oxted started at odds of 14/1 in a twenty-two runner field for the Portland Handicap over 5 1/2 furlongs on good to firm ground. He was assigned a weight of 133 pounds but carried three pounds less as he was ridden by the apprentice jockey Cieren Fallon. He raced just behind the leaders down the centre of the course, went to the front inside the final furlong and won by half a length from the six-year-old gelding A Momentofmadness (winner of the race in 2018). He was the first horse of his age to win the race since 2000. After the race Roger Teal said "He'd started to shine in his work so we were pretty hopeful, but I started panicking when I looked at the stats for three-year-olds. It was an amazing day in the end. He's still a baby and only a frame at the moment. He's worth giving a chance to and I think he could be seriously nice next year."

=== 2020: four-year-old season ===
The flat racing season in Britain was disrupted by the COVID-19 pandemic and the Group 3 Abernant Stakes, which saw Oxted make his first appearance of the year, was run on 5 June behind closed doors at Newmarket. The gelding started 7/2 second favourite behind the Prix Maurice de Gheest winner Brando in a seven-runner field which also included Emaraaty Ana (Gimcrack Stakes), Breathtaking Look (Sceptre Stakes), Mr Lupton (Greenlands Stakes) and Keystroke (winner of the race in 2019). Ridden by Fallon (still an apprentice but unable to claim a weight allowance in a Group race), Oxted went to the front approaching the last quarter mile, accelerated into a clear lead, and held on in the closing stages to win by a length from Breathtaking Look. Teal commented "It has been a stop-start campaign and I had him primed to run in this in April. Thankfully we eased off with him and when we got the date for this we knew what was happening so we stoked him up a bit and God bless him he has done it well. He popped out and travelled lovely. I saw him powering up the hill. Cieren said he was just having a bit of a look around, but he did it nicely".

On 11 July Oxted was stepped up to the highest class to contest the Group 1 July Cup over six furlongs at Newmarket in which he was ridden by Fallon and started at odds of 12/1 in a twelve-runner field. Golden Horde started favourite while the other contenders included Hello Youmzain, Brando, Khadeem, Sceptical (Woodlands Stakes), Threat (Gimcrack Stakes), Equilateral (Scarbrough Stakes), Southern Hills (Windsor Castle Stakes), Namos (Silberne Peitsche) and Sir Dancealot (Lennox Stakes). Oxted tracked the leaders as Golden Horde set the pace before gaining the advantage in the last quarter mile and keeping on well to win by one a quarter lengths from Sceptical with the favourite a neck away in third. After the race Fallon said "He's very fast and versatile, he's won over five and a half and seven, he goes on soft and quick. It shows what a good horse he is and I was just a passenger on a very good horse". Shortly after the race the gelding underwent surgery to remove an ulcer from his throat.

Oxted returned to the racecourse for the British Champions Sprint Stakes over six furlongs on soft ground at Ascot Racecourse on 17 October and started the 9/1 fifth choice in a sixteen-runner field. He was among the leaders from the start and gained the advantage a furlong out but was overtaken in the closing stages and finished fifth in a blanket finish behind Glen Shiel, Brando, One Master and Art Power.

In the 2020 World's Best Racehorse Rankings, Oxted was rated on 120, making him the equal 40th best racehorse in the world.

=== 2021: five-year-old season ===
In February 2021, Oxted ran in the Riyadh Dirt Sprint, finishing seventh of thirteen runners. In April, he defended his crown in the Abernant Stakes at Newmarket. Starting as odds-on favourite and ridden by Ryan Moore, he was narrowly beaten into second place by Summerghand. In his next race, he came third in the Duke of York Stakes at York, three and a half lengths behind winner Starman. In June 2021, Oxted, with Fallon back in the saddle, made his first appearance at Royal Ascot and won the King's Stand Stakes. He then attempted back-to-back wins in the July Cup, but could only manage third behind Starman. Oxted was then retired with a tendon injury.

=== 2026: ten-year-old season ===
In April 2026, Roger Teal announced that Oxted was coming out of retirement. He was entered in the Cathedral Stakes, a listed race over six furlongs at Salisbury on 23 May. Starting as the outsider of the field at 33/1, he finished last of the ten runners, twenty-eight lengths behind the winner.

== Pedigree ==
Pedigree of Oxted (GB), bay gelding, 2016
Sire Mayson (GB) 2008	Invincible Spirit (IRE); 1997	Green Desert (USA)	Danzig
Sire Mayson (GB) 2008	Invincible Spirit (IRE); 1997	Green Desert (USA)	Foreign Courier
Sire Mayson (GB) 2008	Invincible Spirit (IRE); 1997	Rafha (GB)	Kris
Sire Mayson (GB) 2008	Invincible Spirit (IRE); 1997	Rafha (GB)	Eljazzi (IRE)
Sire Mayson (GB) 2008	Mayleaf (GB); 2003	Pivotal	Polar Falcon (USA)
Sire Mayson (GB) 2008	Mayleaf (GB); 2003	Pivotal	Fearless Revival
Sire Mayson (GB) 2008	Mayleaf (GB); 2003	Bayleaf	Efisio
Sire Mayson (GB) 2008	Mayleaf (GB); 2003	Bayleaf	Bayonne
Dam Charlotte Rosina (GB) 2009	Choisir (AUS); 1999	Danehill Dancer (IRE)	Danehill (USA)
Dam Charlotte Rosina (GB) 2009	Choisir (AUS); 1999	Danehill Dancer (IRE)	Mira Adonde (USA)
Dam Charlotte Rosina (GB) 2009	Choisir (AUS); 1999	Great Selection	Lunchtime (GB)
Dam Charlotte Rosina (GB) 2009	Choisir (AUS); 1999	Great Selection	Pensive Mood
Dam Charlotte Rosina (GB) 2009	Intriguing Glimpse (GB); 2001	Piccolo	Warning
Dam Charlotte Rosina (GB) 2009	Intriguing Glimpse (GB); 2001	Piccolo	Woodwind (FR)
Dam Charlotte Rosina (GB) 2009	Intriguing Glimpse (GB); 2001	Running Glimpse (IRE)	Runnett (GB)
Dam Charlotte Rosina (GB) 2009	Intriguing Glimpse (GB); 2001	Running Glimpse (IRE)	One Last Glimpse (GB) (Family: 6-e)
