= Cieren Fallon =

British jockey

- Cieren Fallon on Oxted at Newmarket July racecourse in August 2019

Personal information
- Born: 17 June 1999 (age 27)
- Occupation: Jockey

Horse racing career
- Sport: Horse racing

Major racing wins
- July Cup (2020); King's Stand Stakes (2021); Haydock Sprint Cup (2024)

Significant horses
- Oxted

Cieren Richard Fallon (born 17 June 1999) is a British jockey who competes in flat racing.

== Background ==
Fallon's parents, jockeys Kieren Fallon and Julie (Bowker) Fallon, separated when he was a young child and he grew up in Wigan with his mother, twin sister Brittany and older sister Natalie. He attended St David's College, Llandudno, where he received help with his dyslexia. He played a lot of sport at school and studied for a gym instructor qualification at Runshaw College, but showed no interest in riding or racing until deciding he wanted to become a jockey at the age of seventeen. Encouraged by his father, he did a course at the British Racing School in Newmarket, Suffolk and joined the yard of trainer William Haggas as an apprentice.

== Early career ==
Fallon came second in his first two races, before winning a race for apprentice jockeys on 25/1 outsider Plucky Dip at Leicester in September 2018. The following season saw him crowned champion apprentice jockey in October 2019. Wins in 2019 included the Portland Handicap at Doncaster on the Roger Teal trained Oxted. Fallon spent the winter with trainer Christophe Clement in the United States. Back in England in June 2020, he won his first Group race in the Abernant Stakes on Oxted. This was followed by a first Group 1 victory when Oxted won the July Cup. Having ridden out his claim, Fallon was appointed as second jockey to Qatar Racing in August 2020. He retained his title of champion apprentice jockey in 2020.

On 15 June 2021 Fallon secured his first victory at Royal Ascot when he rode Oxted in the King's Stand Stakes. After the race he said: ""I'm blessed to sit on a horse like this.... He showed his July Cup win was not a fluke."

In February 2022 it was announced that Fallon would ride as first jockey for Qatar Racing while Oisin Murphy was banned from riding.

== Major wins ==
(United Kingdom) Great Britain

- Haydock Sprint Cup - (1) - Montassib (2024)
- July Cup - (1) - Oxted (2020)
- King's Stand Stakes - (1) - Oxted (2021)

Australia

- Golden Eagle - (1) - Lake Forest (2024)
