= Hogmaneigh =

British-bred Thoroughbred racehorse

Hogmaneigh was a Scottish-trained flat race horse, trained by Stuart Williams and Jim Goldie. In June 2007, Hogmaneigh won the Vodafone Dash on Derby Day at Epsom, and in September 2008 won the Portland Handicap at Doncaster. His owner was Lucille Bone.

He made his racecourse debut as a two-year-old in September 2005 at Ayr. The following year, Hogmaneigh was favourite for the Ayr Gold Cup, which is the richest handicap in Europe, but finished 13th.

In September 2008, it was well publicised in the British press that Hogmaneigh had a problem with his feet and that Stuart Williams was buying specially made shoes for him.

In 2009, his new trainer Jim Goldie entered Hogmaneigh in to the Porland Handicap, hoping for a second win.
