= L'Abbesse de Jouarre =

British Thoroughbred racehorse

- Sire: Trappist
- Grandsire: Hermit
- Dam: Festive
- Damsire: Carnival
- Sex: Mare
- Foaled: 1886
- Country: United Kingdom
- Colour: Black
- Breeder: James Snarry
- Owner: Lord Randolph Churchill
- Trainer: Robert Sherwood
- Record: 24:9-3-1

Major wins
- Epsom Oaks (1889); Manchester Cup (1890); Portland Stakes (1890); Hardwicke Stakes (1891)

L'Abbesse de Jouarre (1886 – 6 March 1897) was a Thoroughbred racehorse that won the 1889 Epsom Oaks. The horse was owned by Lord Randolph Churchill and the Earl of Dunraven during her three-year racing career. She was nicknamed "Abscess on the Jaw" during her career due to the difficulty the public had pronouncing her name. A versatile racehorse, L'Abbesse was able to win major races at distances ranging from six furlongs to one-and-a-half miles. Retired from racing in 1891, she was the dam of the influential German broodmare Festa and the leading stallion Desmond. L'Abbesse de Jouarre died on 6 March 1897 during foaling.

== Background ==
L'Abbesse de Jouarre was bred by James Snarry and was foaled in 1886 at Snarry's breeding and training facility at Musley Bank in Malton, North Yorkshire. James Snarry was the son of Sir Tatton Sykes's stud-groom. L'Abbesse's sire, Trappist, was sired by the 1867 Epsom Derby winner and leading stallion Hermit and was "one of a little company of exceptionally speedy horses." L'Abbesse's dam, Festive, was sired by Carnival and produced four full-siblings to L'Abbesse, the colts L'Abbé Morin and The Black Prince (who was gelded and sent to Germany) and the fillies Travesty and Musley Maid. Festive produced 14 foals between 1883 and her death in 1898.

L'Abbesse de Jouarre was purchased in 1887 by Lord Randolph Churchill, the father of Winston Churchill, for £300 (the least expensive of Snarry's yearlings) at the Doncaster sale. L'Abbesse de Jouarre was named, at Lady Randolph's suggestion, after a play of the same name by French historian Ernest Renan. Lady Randolph described L'Abbesse de Jouarre, nicknamed "Abscess on the Jaw" during her racing career, as a small, "beautiful black mare" with a "heart bigger than her body".

== Racing career ==
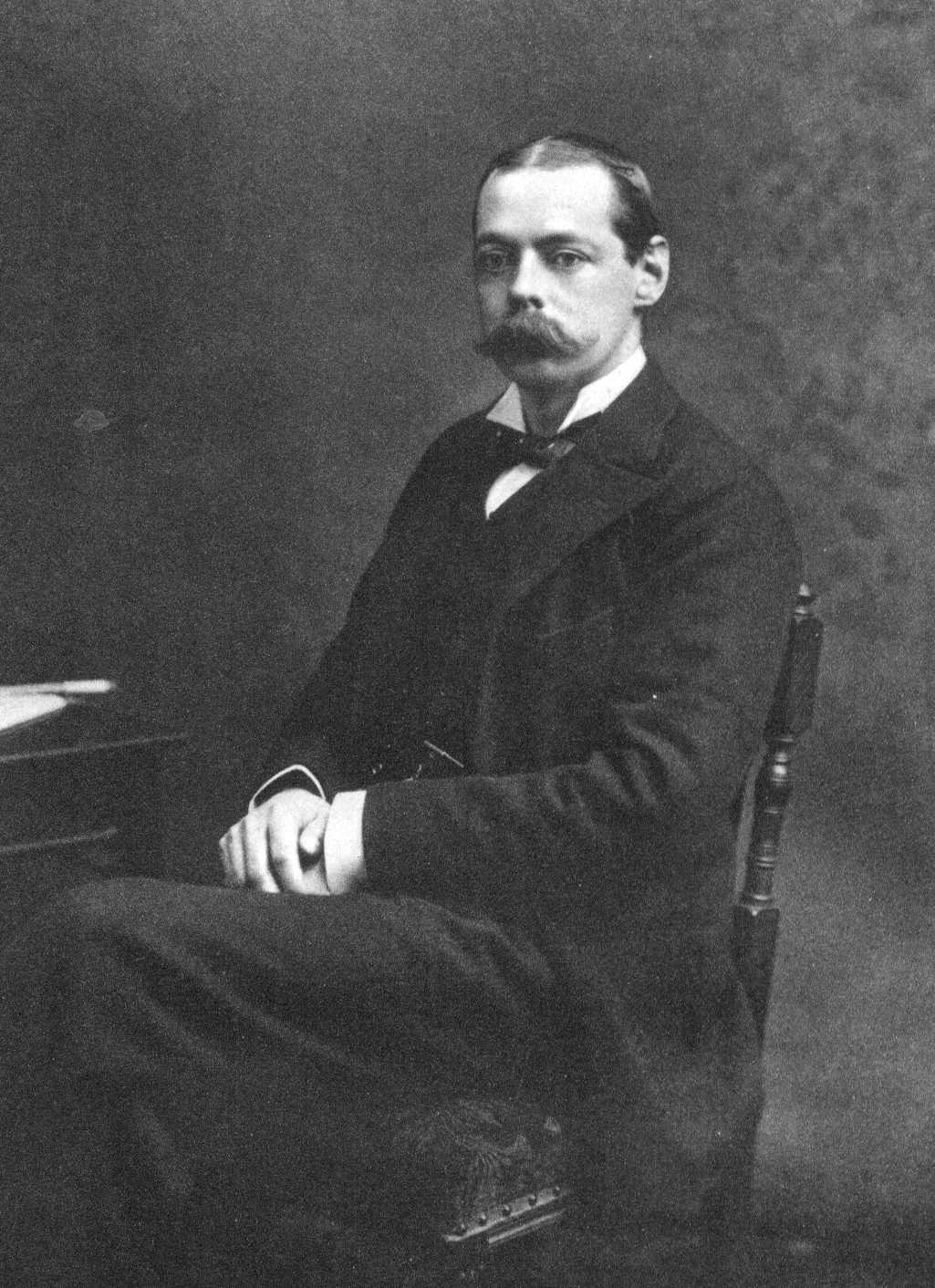
Lord Randolph Churchill owned L'Abbesse de Jouarre in partnership with the Earl of Dunraven during her racing career.

Lord Randolph and the Earl of Dunraven owned and raced L'Abbesse de Jouarre in partnership. Churchill's racing colours were a pink shirt with brown sleeves and cap. L'Abbesse de Jouarre earned the nickname "Abscess on the Jaw" during her racing career, owing to the difficulty the public and bookmakers had in pronouncing her name correctly, leading her to be associated with the phonetically similar phrase. Her trainer Robert Sherwood referred to the horse as L'Abbesse to avoid the pronunciation issue.

=== 1888: two-year-old season ===
L'Abbesse de Jouarre ran eight times as a two-year-old, winning three races. In her first start at Croydon, L'Abbesse ran unplaced, losing to the colt Amphion. L'Abbesse won the May Plate Stakes at Newmarket and two other races. She finished second in the Fernhill Stakes at Ascot, losing to Hazlehatch. L'Abbesse won £935 during her two-year-old season.

=== 1889: three-year-old season ===
In her first start of the season, L'Abbesse, starting at 20-to-1 odds, won The Oaks by a neck against the betting favourite Minthe. The Churchills did not witness L'Abbesse win the race; Lord Randolph was fishing in Norway at the time, and his wife was boating on the Thames when she heard that the "Abscess on the Jaw" had won. Lord Dunraven was also absent, spending the day "sailing in his five-rater [yacht] at Calshot Castle". L'Abbesse started in four other races that year, but did not win again. On 19 June, she finished third to Whitelegs and Veracity in the mile long Royal Hunt Cup. L'Abbesse finished sixth in the St. Leger Stakes, won by Donovan.

=== 1890 and 1891: four- and five-year-old seasons ===
On 23 May, L'Abbesse de Jouarre won the 2,000 sovereign Manchester Cup, beating 17 other horses and winning by three-quarters of a length over the horse Father Confessor. L'Abbesse was second in the Gold Vase in June at Ascot, losing to Tyrant, a horse owned by A.M. Singer "of sewing machine notoriety". On 23 July, L'Abbesse was second in the Liverpool Cup, losing to the horse Father Confessor. At Sandown, L'Abbesse defeated "a big field of sprinters" to win the Princess of Wales's Stakes, and she also won the Portland Stakes. In 1891, L'Abbesse ran unplaced in the City and Suburban Handicap and won the Hardwicke Stakes.

== Breeding career ==
Lord Randolph Churchill retained an interest in L'Abbesse until June 1894, when illness and strained finances forced him to sell his share to the Earl of Dunraven. L'Abbesse de Jouarre only produced three live foals during her breeding career; a colt and a filly to the cover of St. Simon, and a brown colt sired by Galopin named Cowl, which was destroyed at a young age due to lameness. L'Abbesse de Jouarre's 1893 filly foal, Festa, sired by St. Simon, was exported to Germany and became a broodmare in Baron Arthur von Weinberg's stud. Festa "became one of the most important mares in German breeding history", producing the good racehorses Festina, Fels, Fabula, Faust and Furor, whose combined race earnings were almost 1,500,000 marks. Her 1896 St. Simon colt, Desmond, was a successful racehorse as a two-year-old but did not succeed in the major three-year-old races. Desmond became one of the top ten leading sires in the United Kingdom and Ireland in the early 1900s, topping the list in 1913; he sired the 1913 Epsom Derby winner Aboyeur, and Grand Parade's dam. L'Abbesse de Jouarre died on 6 March 1897 while trying to deliver a stillborn foal sired by Isinglass.

== Pedigree ==
Pedigree of L'Abbesse de Jouarre (GB), Black filly, 1886
Sire Trappist (GB) Bay, 1872	Hermit; 1864	Newminister	Touchstone
Sire Trappist (GB) Bay, 1872	Hermit; 1864	Newminister	Beeswing
Sire Trappist (GB) Bay, 1872	Hermit; 1864	Seclusion	Tadmor
Sire Trappist (GB) Bay, 1872	Hermit; 1864	Seclusion	Miss Sellon
Sire Trappist (GB) Bay, 1872	Bunch; 1862	Muscovite	Hetman Platoff
Sire Trappist (GB) Bay, 1872	Bunch; 1862	Muscovite	Camel Mare
Sire Trappist (GB) Bay, 1872	Bunch; 1862	Diomedia	Weatherbit
Sire Trappist (GB) Bay, 1872	Bunch; 1862	Diomedia	Taurina
Dam Festive (GB) Bay, 1877	Carnival; 1860	Sweetmeat	Gladiator
Dam Festive (GB) Bay, 1877	Carnival; 1860	Sweetmeat	Lollypop
Dam Festive (GB) Bay, 1877	Carnival; 1860	Volatile	Buckthorn
Dam Festive (GB) Bay, 1877	Carnival; 1860	Volatile	Jocose
Dam Festive (GB) Bay, 1877	Piercy; 1872	Anterstone	Touchstone
Dam Festive (GB) Bay, 1877	Piercy; 1872	Anterstone	Lady Mary
Dam Festive (GB) Bay, 1877	Piercy; 1872	Fair Agnes	Voltigeur
Dam Festive (GB) Bay, 1877	Piercy; 1872	Fair Agnes	Little Agnes
