= Epsom Downs Racecourse =

Horse racing venue in England

Coordinates: 51°18′35″N 0°15′20″W

Epsom Downs

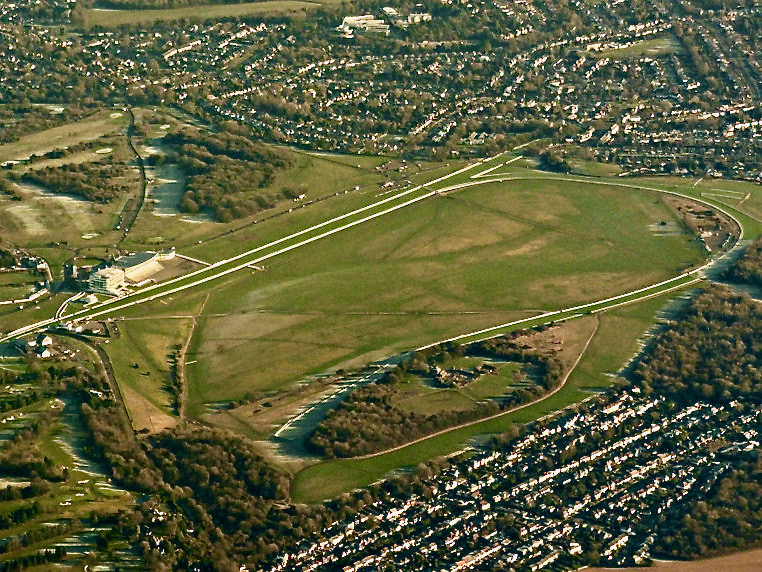
- Aerial view of Epsom Downs racecourse
- Interactive map of Epsom Downs
- Location: Epsom, Surrey, UK
- Operated by: Jockey Club Racecourses
- Date opened: 1661 (first recorded race)
- Screened on: Racing TV
- Course type: Flat
- Notable races: Epsom Derby; Epsom Oaks; Coronation Cup

Epsom Downs is a Grade 1 racecourse in a hilly area near Epsom in Surrey, England which is used for thoroughbred horse racing. The "Downs" referred to in the name are part of the North Downs.

The course has a crowd capacity of 130,000 including people watching from the Epsom Downs, an area freely open to the public. The course is best known for hosting the Derby Stakes, which has come to be widely referred to as The Derby or as the Cazoo Derby for sponsorship reasons, the United Kingdom's premier thoroughbred horse race for three-year-old colts and fillies, over a mile and a half (2400 m). It also hosts the Oaks Stakes (also widely referred to as The Oaks) for three-year-old fillies, and the Coronation Cup for horses aged four years and upwards. All three races are Group 1 races and run over the same course and distance.

The chairman of the course since 2022 is Brian Finch. The course is operated by the Jockey Club. Queen Elizabeth II attended the Derby in most years of her reign.

== History ==
The first recorded race was held on the Downs in 1661, although a local burial list of 1625 refers to "William Stanley who in running the race fell from his horse and brake his neck" and in some sources racing is recorded as dating from the 1640s, so it is likely that racing was established much earlier than that. Epsom is referenced in the diary of Samuel Pepys in 1663 and Charles II is said to have been a racegoer there. By 1684, Epsom had a clerk of the course and from 1730 was hosting twice yearly race meetings.

At Epsom on 3 May 1769 the famous racehorse Eclipse had the first of his many victories in an undefeated career on the turf.

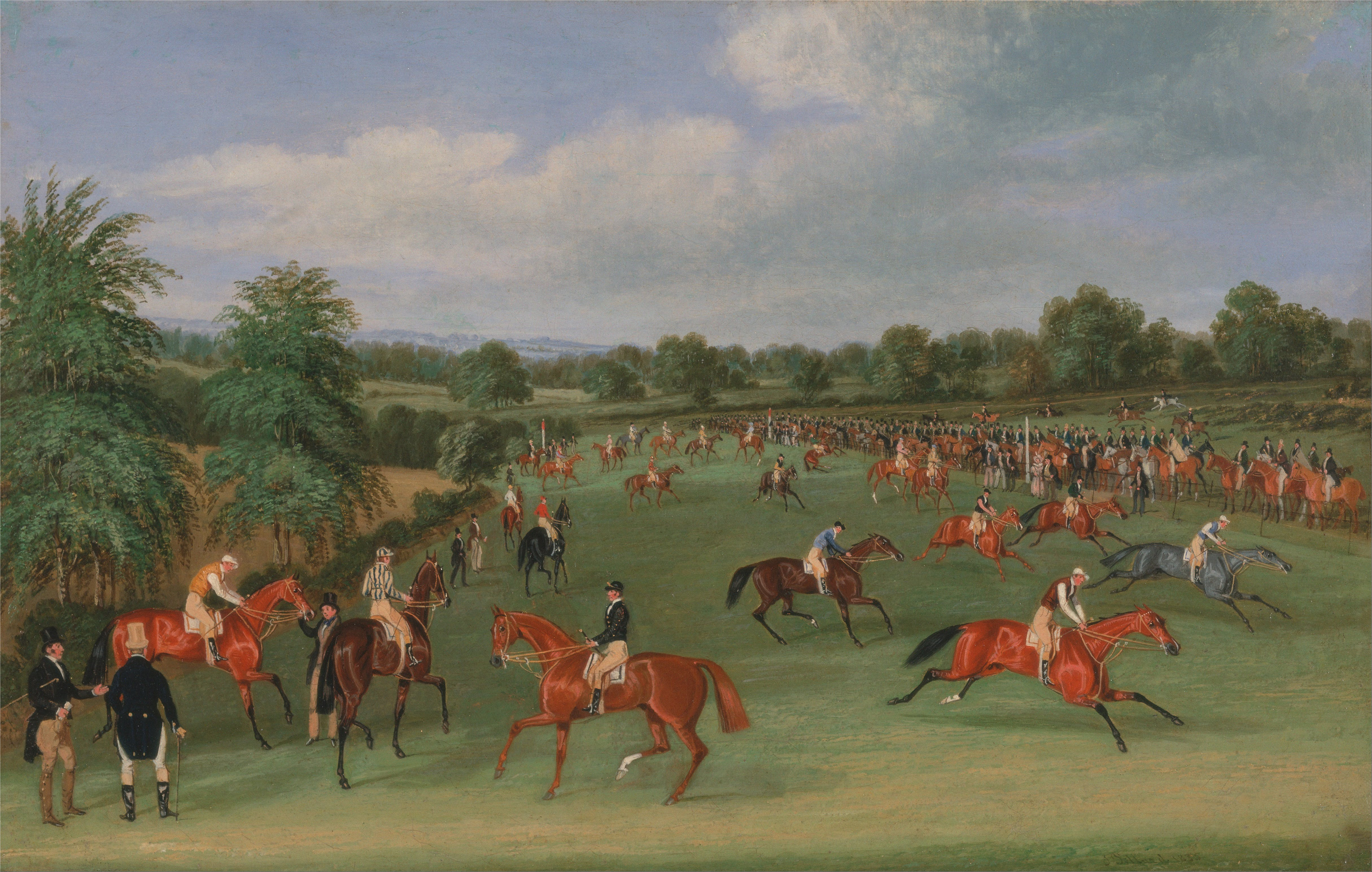
Epsom Derby; painting by James Pollard, c. 1835

In the summer of 1779 Edward Smith-Stanley, 12th Earl of Derby, organised a race for himself and his friends to race their three-year-old fillies. He named it the Oaks after his nearby estate. The race became so successful that in the following year 1780 a new race was added for three-year-old colts and fillies—-the Derby. In 1784 the course was extended to its current distance of a mile and a half and Tattenham Corner was introduced.

Henry Dorling, step-father to cookery writer Mrs Beeton, was a Clerk of the Course at Epsom, appointed in 1840.

In 1913 the suffragette Emily Davison threw herself in front of King George V's horse Anmer, bringing him down. Davison was badly injured and died four days later.

In 1952 the racecourse was featured extensively in the film Derby Day set around the 1952 Epsom Derby.

In 2009 the racecourse opened the new Duchess's Stand, named after Camilla, Duchess of Cornwall. It has a capacity of 11,000 and has a 960 m^{2} (10 000 sq ft) hall. It can be used for banqueting, conferences and exhibitions. The estimated cost of the new stand, which was built by Willmott Dixon, was £23.5 million.

On 4 June 2011, in their first public outing since returning from their Seychelles honeymoon, Prince William, now the Prince of Wales, and his wife, Catherine, (along with the late Queen, William's brother, Prince Harry, and Catherine's parents, Michael and Carole Middleton) attended the 2011 Epsom Derby at the track.

In 2022 the main stand of the racecourse, previously been known as The Queen's Stand, was renamed the Queen Elizabeth II Stand.

== Description ==
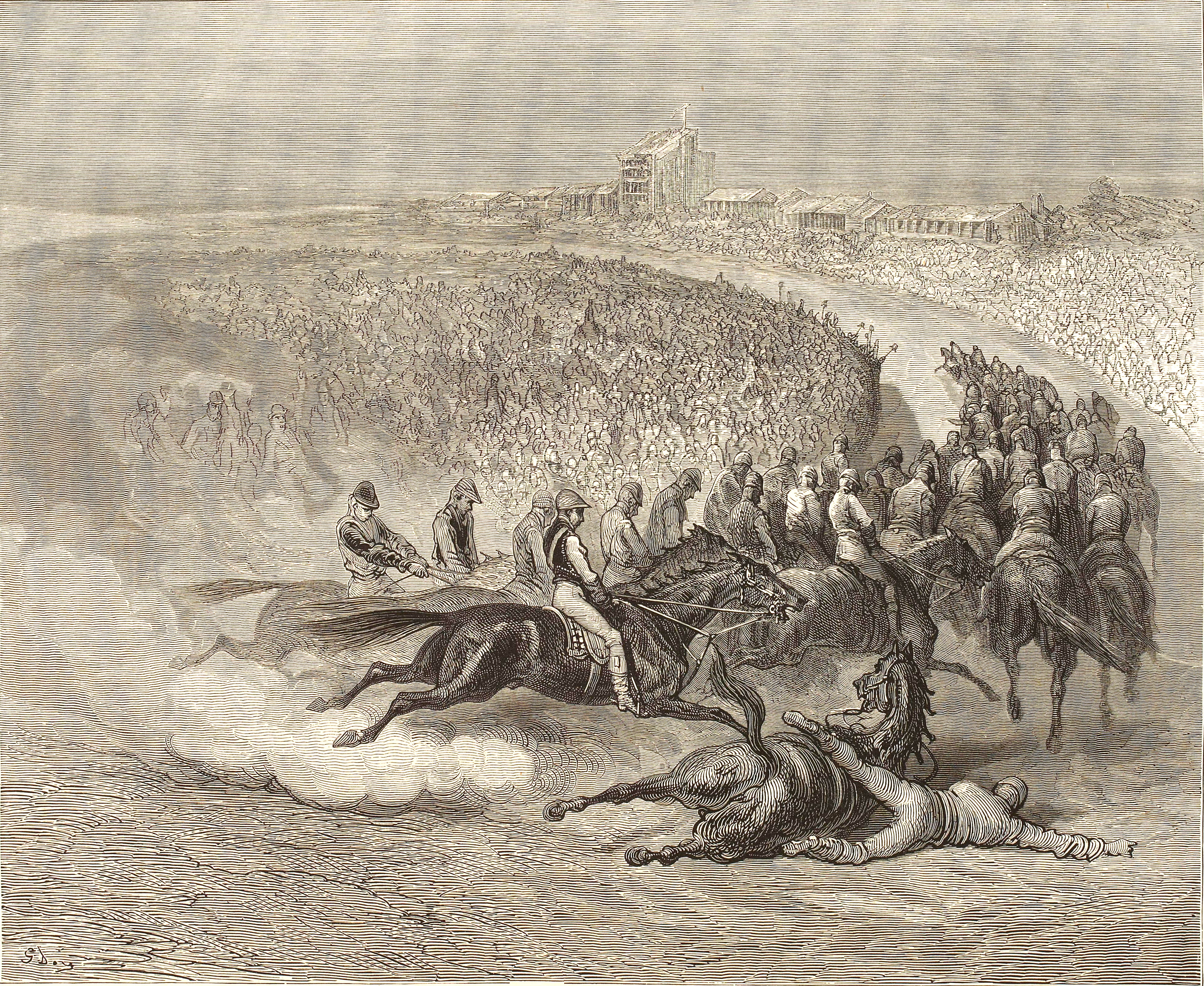
Tattenham Corner in 1872, by Gustave Doré

The racecourse is between Epsom, Tadworth and Langley Vale. As it is in a public area, people can watch the Derby free, and this meant that the Derby used to be the most attended sporting event of the year. It presents a stern challenge for inexperienced horses and a true test of stamina for those that might previously have contested the 2,000 Guineas Stakes over a mile (1600 m). Unusually, the racecourse is not a circuit but is roughly U-shaped with chutes for the start of sprint races over five, six and seven furlongs. The Derby course features an ascent to the top of the hill followed by a wide, sweeping left turn (Tattenham Corner) as the horses descend towards the straight. The half-mile straight is mainly downhill, with a final sharp ascent in the last hundred yards. Thus the times for the sprint races tend to be much faster than those on flatter tracks. Clockings for the five-furlong course have included 53.6 s (hand-timed) by Indigenous in 1960 and 53.70 s (electrically timed) by Spark Chief in 1983.

Racehorse trainers based in the local area include Simon Dow and Laura Mongan.

The racecourse is served by the Epsom Downs station as well as Tattenham Corner station, which is where the British monarch alights from the Royal Train on race days.

== Notable races ==
Month	Meeting	DOW	Race Name	Type	Grade	Distance	Age/Sex
April	April Meeting	Wednesday	City and Suburban Handicap	Flat	Handicap	1m 2f 17y	4yo+
April	April Meeting	Wednesday	Great Metropolitan Handicap	Flat	Handicap	1m 4f 6y	4yo+
April	April Meeting	Wednesday	Blue Riband Trial Stakes	Flat	Conditions	1m 2f 17y	3yo
June	Derby	Friday	Woodcote Stakes	Flat	Conditions	6f 3y	2yo
June	Derby	Friday	The Oaks	Flat	Group 1	1m 4f 6y	3yo f
June	Derby	Friday	Surrey Stakes	Flat	Listed	7f 3y	3yo
June	Derby	Saturday	Tattenham Corner Stakes	Flat	Group 3	7f 3y	4yo+
June	Derby	Saturday	Coronation Cup	Flat	Group 1	1m 4f 6y	4yo+
June	Derby	Saturday	Princess Elizabeth Stakes	Flat	Group 3	1m 113y	3yo+ f
June	Derby	Saturday	Diomed Stakes	Flat	Group 3	1m 113y	3yo+
June	Derby	Saturday	Epsom Dash	Flat	Handicap	5f	3yo+
June	Derby	Saturday	The Derby	Flat	Group 1	1m 4f 6y	3yo c+f

Other races

- Epsom Dash

== Gallery ==
Views of the Epsom Grandstands
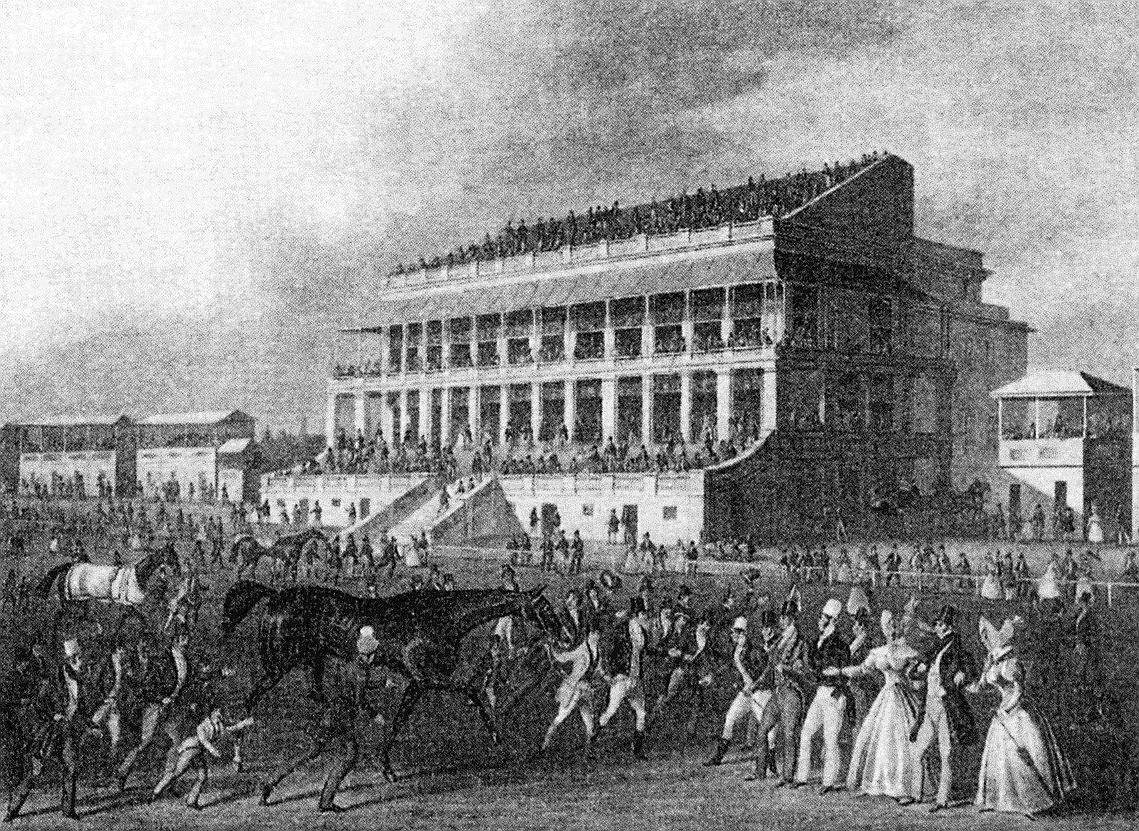
Epsom Grandstand in the 1830s

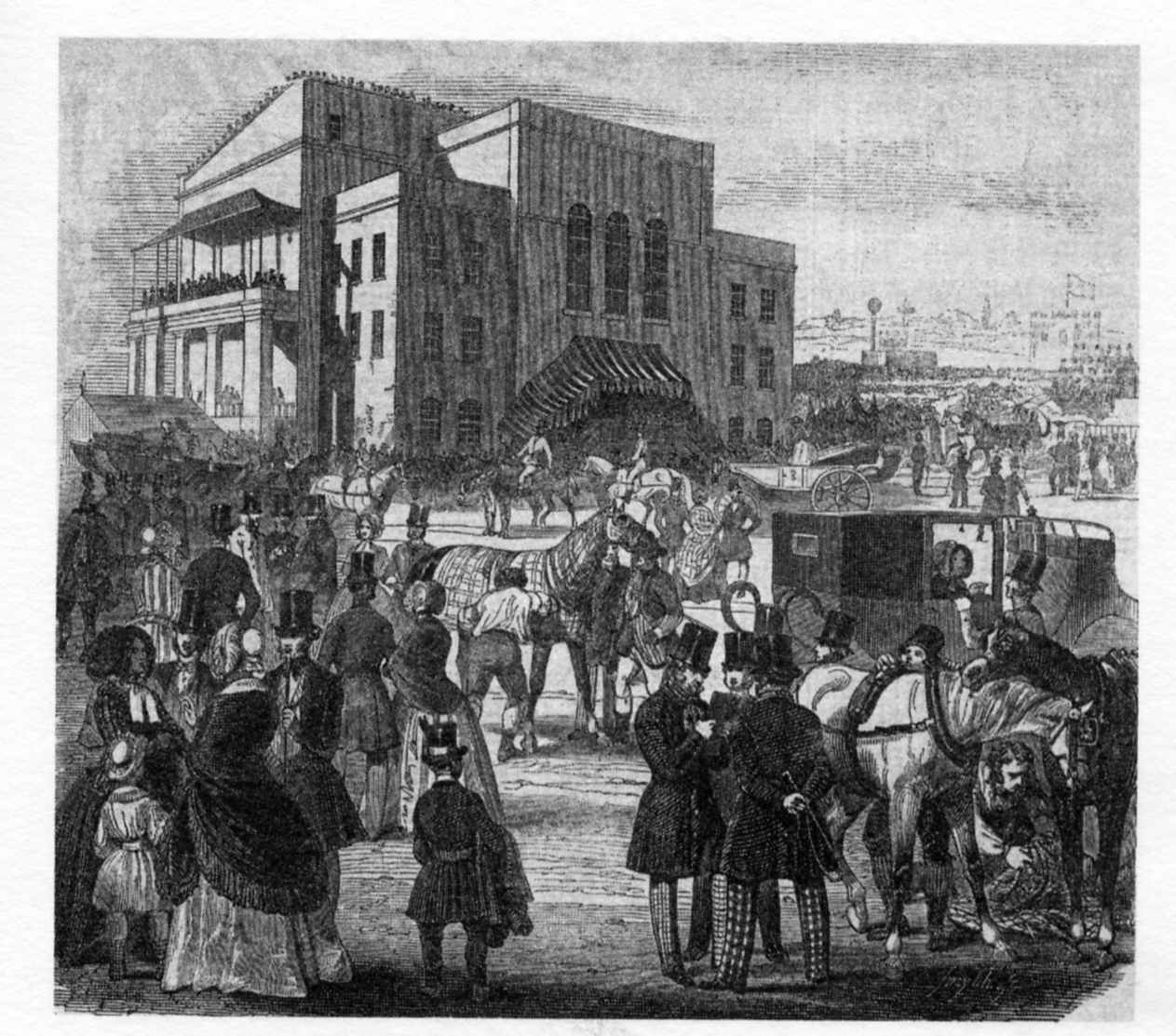
Epsom Grandstand in 1846

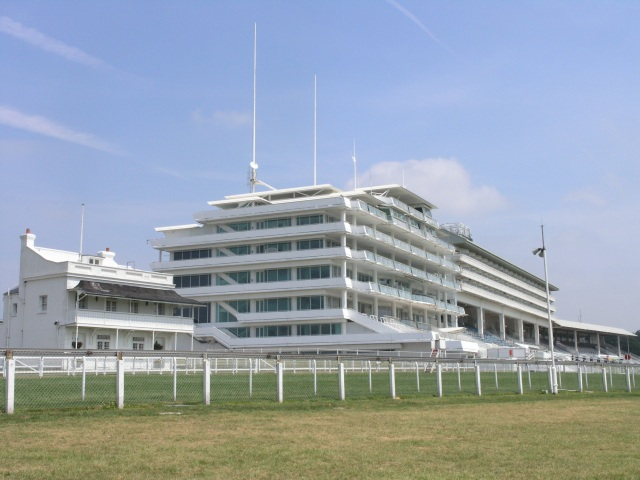
Epsom Grandstand in 2010

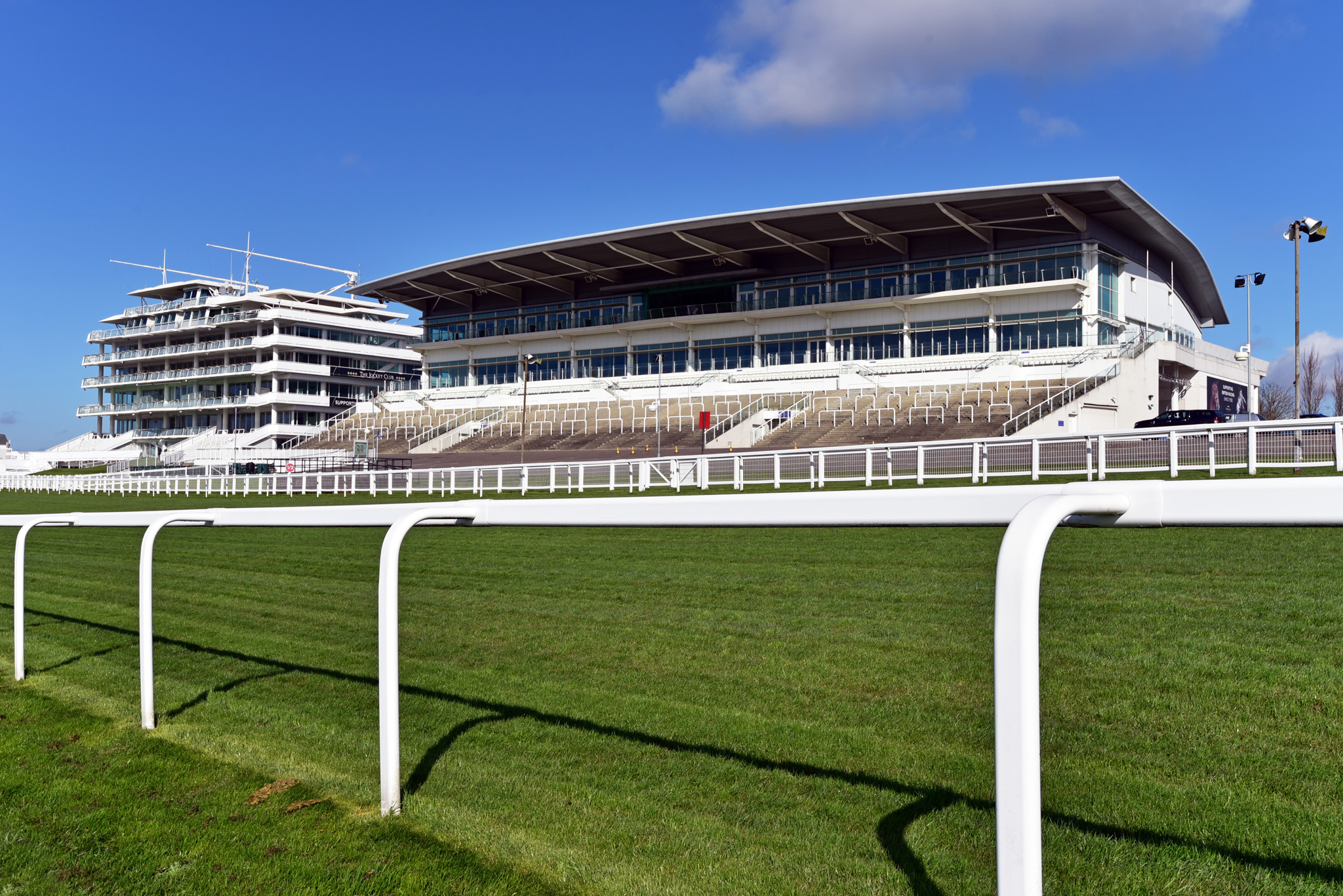
Epsom Grandstand in 2020

== Bibliography ==
- Holland, Anne (1991). Classic Horse Races. London: Queen Anne Press. ISBN 0-356-19708-5.
