= New Seeker =

British-bred Thoroughbred racehorse

New Seeker was a racehorse owned by Elite Racing Club.

He was foaled on 1 March 2000. His sire was Green Desert and his dam was Ahbab.

New Seeker raced solely on the Flat. His first race was on 21 September 2002 and his final race was on 30 May 2008.

He won two major flat handicap races in the UK during 2003. These races were the Britannia Stakes (Handicap) at Royal Ascot on 19 June 2003 and the Tote International Stakes Showcase Handicap at Ascot on 26 July 2003.

He again won two major flat handicap races in 2005. These races were the Royal Hunt Cup (Heritage Handicap) at Royal Ascot at York on 15 June 2005 and the Totesport International Stakes Heritage Handicap at Newbury on 23 July 2005.

New Seeker was trained firstly by Clive Cox and later by Paul Cole.

New Seeker was a gelding.

New Seeker was retired in June 2008 and moved to Greatwood in October of the same year. He died there on 12 August 2009; he was put down after suffering a spine/pelvic injury.
