= Simon Dow =

British racehorse trainer

Simon Dow (born June 13, 1961) is a first-generation racehorse trainer, based on the Epsom Downs. He owned several horses that have enjoyed fan club status, including Dark Honey, Confronter, Young Ern, and Chief's Song.

More recently, horses such as Birkspiel (owned by Soccer AM's Helen Chamberlain) Aurigny, Nagnagnag, Turtle Valley, Gallery God, Bettalatethannever, and Quantum Leap have kept the winners flowing.
