= Charlie Trigg =

British jockey (1881–1945)

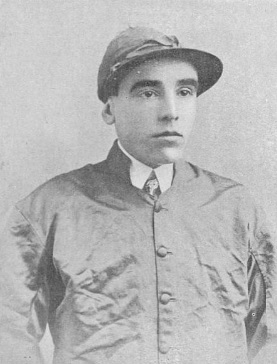
- Charlie Trigg, pictured in 1902

Personal information
- Born: 5 January 1881 Minsterworth, Gloucestershire, England
- Died: 26 December 1945 (aged 64) Gloucester, Gloucestershire, England
- Occupation: Jockey

Horse racing career
- Sport: Horse racing
- Career wins: 843

Major racing wins
- Major race wins: Epsom Oaks (1910)

Charles George Trigg (5 January 1881 – 26 December 1945) was a British flat jockey of the early 20th century, winning The Oaks in 1910.

== Early life ==
Trigg was born the illegitimate son of Ellen Trigg in Minsterworth, Gloucestershire, and baptised at the parish church on 13 February 1881. He went to school at Walmore Hill, Westbury-on-Severn. In a 1936 interview with the Gloucester Journal he recalled his frequent travels to Gloucester with his beloved grandmother to sell eggs and other produce from the family farm. After his grandmother bought a Russian pony, he could often be found riding it to deliver goods to her customers.

He was apprenticed to Sir John Thursby after seeing an advertisement for the position by chance, in an old copy of the Sportsman. After attending an interview at Sir John’s home in Park Lane, he worked as a stable lad at Thursby’s estate at Boveridge House, Cranborne, Dorset, before beginning his career as a jockey in 1902.

== Racing career ==
Trigg won several renowned races during his career, including the Chester Cup in 1903 on Vendale, the Cesarewitch in 1906 on Mintagon, the Goodwood Cup in 1909 on Carrousel, and the Lincolnshire Handicap in 1911 on Mercutio. His only Classic success, however, was on Rosedrop, owned by Sir Arthur Bass, in The Oaks in 1910.

When Newbury Racecourse was opened on 26 September 1905, Charlie Trigg won the very first race at the circuit on Copper King and was presented with a gold-mounted whip to the value of £10.

In 1910 Trigg rode 95 winners, and in 1911 he rode 111, although he never headed the list for the unofficial title of Champion Jockey. Following the 1912 season he signed a contract with Baron Alfonso Rothschild to race in Austria for three years.

Trigg later recounted how a conversation over dinner following a chance encounter with an Englishman he knew in the Diplomatic Service, at his hotel in Vienna, led him to flee Austria shortly before the outbreak of the First World War, travelling by train via Prague and Frankfurt, and arriving in Brussels to learn that the United Kingdom had declared war on Germany. Having finally arrived in the UK on Monday evening, 3 August 1914, Trigg made a winning ride on the Tuesday afternoon at Brighton, on a horse owned by Charles Hibbert, for whom he had ridden before his Austrian contract. Jockeys from the UK and the British Empire were reported to have been interned in Austria in the early part of the war.

During his career, which was curtailed by the reduction in racing brought about by the First World War, he rode a total of 843 winners. Trigg made rides in the UK and occasionally in Ireland during the War, and retired from racing in 1918.

A music hall song, Jean Loves All the Jockeys, written in 1913 by Fred Godfrey and Billy Williams, and sung by Williams, namechecks Charlie Trigg among a dozen or so renowned jockeys of the day.

== Career records ==
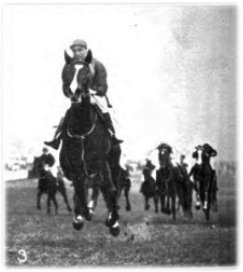
Charlie Trigg, winning the 1910 Epsom Oaks on Rosedrop

Trigg’s 843 career race wins in the UK were achieved between 1902 and 1918.

1902: 47 wins from 238 races

1903: 85 wins from 378 races

1904: 61 wins from 642 races

1905: 46 wins from 523 races

1906: 63 wins from 555 races

1907: 53 wins from 539 races

1908: 77 wins from 670 races

1909: 78 wins from 700 races

1910: 95 wins from 702 races

1911: 111 wins from 733 races

1912: 60 wins from 618 races

1913: under contract to race in Austria: rode 43 winners in Austria; known to have made rides in the UK before and after the Austrian season

1914: under contract to race in Austria: known to have made rides in the UK after fleeing on the eve of the First World War

1915: 20 wins from 175 races

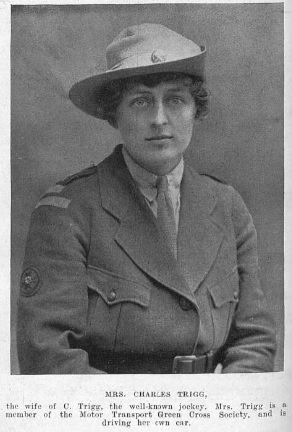
Mrs Winifred Trigg, pictured in 1917

1916: 9 wins from 137 races

1917: not listed among the leading jockeys

1918: not listed among the leading jockeys

== Personal life ==
On 30 March 1907 Trigg married Winifred Rhoda Maynard Davis, originally from Portishead in Somerset, at St Andrew’s Church, Westminster.

In 1919 Trigg divorced his wife on account of her relationship with a young army officer originally from Lancashire, Captain Percy Walker Kippax, whom she later married. The divorce caused headlines, with the court hearing evidence from the Triggs’ housekeeper at their Dulwich home to support the allegations against Mrs Trigg. Trigg and his wife had one daughter, Phyllis; he was awarded custody of her following the divorce, and she later married a clergyman who served in parishes at Sneyd Green, Staffordshire and Fremington, Devon.

== Later life and death ==
After his divorce, Trigg lost his wealth, returned to Gloucestershire and is reported to have died a pauper at Gloucester General Hospital in December 1945. His funeral was held at Minsterworth Church, and the service was officiated by his son-in-law, Rev Peter Pearson.
