= Frankie Durr =

English jockey

Personal information
- Born: 10 November 1925 Liverpool, England
- Died: 18 January 2000 (aged 74) Cambridge, England
- Occupations: Jockey and trainer

Horse racing career
- Sport: Horse racing

Major racing wins
- British Classic Races: 2000 Guineas Stakes (1973, 1978); St Leger Stakes (1966, 1973); Other major races: Sprint Cup (1969); Nunthorpe Stakes (1968); Dewhurst Stakes (1967); Irish Derby (1966); July Cup (1968, 1969); Middle Park Stakes (1975)

Racing awards
- British flat racing Champion Apprentice (1945 - tied)

Significant horses
- Hametus, Hittite Glory, Mon Fils, Peleid, Roland Gardens, So Blessed, Sodium, Tudor Music
- Updated on 22 October 2023

Frankie Durr (10 November 1925 - 18 January 2000) was a four-time Classic-winning jockey in the 1960s and 1970s and later a moderately successful racehorse trainer.

== Jockey career ==
Francis Durr was born in Liverpool on 10 November 1925.

He was apprenticed at first to Jack Payne at Bedford Cottage stables in Newmarket and then Willie Pratt and had his first ride in 1942.

He rode his first winner, Merle, at Pontefract in 1944 and the following year was joint Champion Apprentice, tied with Tommy Gosling on 10 wins. It took him some time after this to build a reputation but eventually, he became the retained jockey of the Duke of Norfolk at Arundel Stable, where he would stay for six years. During this time he won the Free Handicap on Caerlaverock in 1952. He also rode for Major Holliday, Geoffrey Barling, Lady Beaverbrook and David Robinson. For Barling, he won the 1970 City and Suburban Handicap on Granados, and for Lady Beaverbrook the 1967 Dewhurst Stakes on Hametus. For Robinson, he won the 1968 Nunthorpe on So Blessed and the 1971 Ebor Handicap on Knotty Pine. Knotty Pine was trainer Michael Jarvis's first winner when Durr rode him in March 1968.

His first Classic win was the 1966 St Leger which he won for George Todd on Sodium, a horse he had also won the Irish Derby on. He won the Leger again in 1973 on Peleid. He won the 2,000 Guineas twice - first in 1973 on the 50/1 shot Mon Fils for Richard Hannon, then on Roland Gardens. Hannon credited that 2,000 Guineas victory with keeping him in business: "If it wasn't for Frank, I wouldn't be training now... We were going through a pretty bad spell and he helped me big time. We got the Guineas winner Mon Fils, and things started to happen."

Late in his career, he began riding for Henry Cecil and shipping magnate Ravi Tikkoo. His best season numerically was 1969, when he won 87 races including the Haydock Sprint Cup and July Cup on Tudor Music.

== Training career ==
After his retirement as a jockey at the end of 1978, he began training from Fitzroy Stables in Newmarket, which he had bought in 1958. In 1982, he nearly had to close his stable, after it was hit by a virus, but things had recovered back to normal by the next season. In that year, the stable had 59 horses, with Greville Starkey as first jockey and two apprentices, Aaron Weiss and Robert Lea. For three years, Jeff Pearce was his assistant.

His biggest wins as a trainer were the 1980 Portland Handicap with Swelter, the 1983 Cambridgeshire Handicap with Sagamore, ridden by Taffy Thomas and the 1985 Ayr Gold Cup with Camps Heath. He counted both Sheikh Mohammed and Khalid Abdullah among his owners.

His best season as a trainer was 1983, when he sent out 57 winners.

== Personal life ==
Durr married Odette in 1954 and had one daughter, Elizabeth, who later married jockey Geoff Baxter. Durr refused to ride at evening meetings so he could spend time with his family at his farm in Kirtling outside Newmarket, which cost him in terms of winners and being able to challenge for the Jockeys' Championship, although he was 4th in both 1968 and 1969. He retired from training in 1991 and spent more time playing golf.

He died aged 74 in Addenbrookes Hospital, Cambridge, on 18 January 2000. His son-in-law Baxter explained that he had spent the Christmas period with family, but then had a nosebleed, went into hospital and didn't come out.

== Reputation ==
Described as a "tough and wiry little Liverpudlian", former boss Hannon recalled him as "a great gentleman, a good man for the game, and a really true professional," while jockey Taffy Thomas noted him as "a great race-rider" who "wouldn't give an inch in a finish". Paul Cook rode for him and against him and called him a "tremendous" jockey and "very fair" trainer. Another fellow jockey, Eric Eldin referred to him as a "hard little jockey and, at the same time, very brainy. He used to work everything out - the wind conditions and when he should tuck in, how the grass had been mown and how that would affect the running of a race - the real finer points that no other jockey would think about".

== Major wins (as jockey) ==
(United Kingdom) Great Britain

- Sprint Cup - Tudor Music (1969)
- Nunthorpe Stakes - So Blessed (1968)
- Dewhurst Stakes - Hametus (1967)
- 2000 Guineas Stakes - (2) - Mon Fils (1973), Roland Gardens (1978)
- St Leger Stakes - (2) - Sodium (1966), Peleid (1973)
- July Cup - (2) - So Blessed (1968), Tudor Music (1969)
- Middle Park Stakes - Hittite Glory (1975)

(Republic of Ireland) Ireland

- Irish Derby - Sodium (1966)

== See also ==
- List of jockeys

== Bibliography ==
- Mortimer, Roger; Onslow, Richard; Willett, Peter (1978). Biographical Encyclopaedia of British Racing. London: Macdonald and Jane's. ISBN 0-354-08536-0.
- Wright, Howard (1986). The Encyclopaedia of Flat Racing. London: Robert Hale. ISBN 0-7090-2639-0.
