= Unfortunately (horse) =

Irish Thoroughbred racehorse

- Sire: Society Rock
- Grandsire: Rock of Gibraltar
- Dam: Unfortunate
- Damsire: Komaite
- Sex: Stallion
- Foaled: 16 March 2015
- Country: Ireland
- Colour: Bay
- Breeder: Tally-Ho Stud
- Owner: Jeff Laughton & Elaine Burke; Cheveley Park Stud
- Trainer: Karl Burke
- Record: 12: 4-2-0
- Earnings: £284,239

Major wins
- Prix Robert Papin (2017); Prix Morny (2017); Renaissance Stakes (2018)

Unfortunately (foaled 16 March 2015), is an Irish-bred, British-trained Thoroughbred racehorse and sire. He showed top class form as a two-year-old in 2017 when he won the Prix Robert Papin and the Prix Morny. In the following year he struggled to reproduce his best form but ended his track career with a victory in the Renaissance Stakes.

== Background ==
Unfortunately is a bay horse with a white star and white socks on his front legs bred in Ireland by the County Westmeath-based Tally-Ho Stud. In September 2016 the yearling was consigned to the Tattersalls Ireland sale and was bought for €24,000 by the British trainer Karl Burke. Unfortunately was trained by Burke at his Spigot Lodge Stable near Middleham, North Yorkshire. When he began his track career the horse was owned by Burke's wife Elaine in partnership with Jeff Laughton.

He was from the first crop of foals sired by Society Rock, a top-class sprinter who won the Golden Jubilee Stakes in 2011 and the Haydock Sprint Cup. He made a very promising start to his stud career but died after contracting laminitis in 2016. Unfortunately's dam Unfortunate showed modest racing ability, winning two minor races from 22 starts. She was a female-line descendant of the British broodmare Probity (foaled 1943), making her a distant relative of the Australian champion Manikato.

== Racing career ==
=== 2017: two-year-old season ===
Unfortunately began his racing career by running fifth in a novice stakes (for two-year-olds with no more than two previous wins) over five furlongs at Newmarket Racecourse on 18 April. A month later he started 13/8 favourite for a similar event at Hamilton Racecourse and recorded his first success as he accelerated away from his rivals in the final furlong to win "readily" by three lengths. In this race he was partnered, as on his debut by the apprentice jockey Clifford Lee.

Tony Piccone took the ride when the colt was stepped up in class and sent to France for the Listed Prix La Flèche over 1000 metres at Maisons-Laffitte Racecourse on 10 June. After being restrained at the rear of the ten-runner field he finished strongly but failed by a head to catch Ardenode. At Pontefract Racecourse in July he contested a minor race over six furlongs and went down by a neck to the Charlie Appleby-trained Zaman. Unfortunately returned to Maisons-Laffitte later that month and started the 10.2/1 outsider of the six runners for the Group 2 Prix Robert Papin over 1100 metres. The Queen Mary Stakes winner Heartache was made favourite. Ridden by Piccone he raced towards the rear before moving up to join the leaders 200 metres from the finish and pulling ahead in the closing stages to win by half a length from Patriotism. The racecourse stewards held an inquiry into possible interference between the winner and the fourth-placed High Dream Milena but left the result unaltered. Karl Burke commented "I'm relieved we kept the race in the stewards’ room. I'm not sure we'd have done if the French horse had finished second. It's a great result and I'm delighted for everybody...If he'd finished third or fourth I'd have been satisfied, but I'm not surprised he's run so well. He's a horse with a lot of ability".

On 20 August Unfortunately was then moved up to the highest class for the Group 1 Prix Morny over 1200 metres at Deauville Racecourse in which he was partnered by Piccone started at odds of 5.7/1. The Prix de Cabourg winner Tantheem headed the betting while the other six runner included Different League (Albany Stakes), Havana Grey (National Stakes, also trained by Karl Burke), Nyaleti (Princess Margaret Stakes) and Zonza (Prix du Bois). Wearing blinkers he was held up towards the rear as usual before overtaking his stablemate Havana Grey 200 metres out and won "readily" by a length and a half. After the race Burke said "In the early part of the year the pair worked together and Havana Grey was always quicker, but you could see Unfortunately was catching up all the time and he got in front this time... to have a one-two in the Morny is fantastic... They both have futures beyond being two-year-olds".

After his win in the Morny, Unfortunately was acquired by the Newmarket-based Cheveley Park Stud. On his final run of the season, Unfortunately contested the Group 1 Middle Park Stakes at Newmarket on 25 September and came home ninth of the twelve runners behind U S Navy Flag.

In the official European rankings for 2017, Unfortunately was rated the sixth-best two-year-old, behind U S Navy Flag, Saxon Warrior, Roaring Lion, Expert Eye and Verbal Dexterity.

=== 2018: three-year-old season ===
As a three-year-old Unfortunately was campaigned in sprint races but showed little early sign of recovering his juvenile form. He ran seventh behind Sands of Mali in the Temple Stakes at Haydock Park in May, tenth to Eqtidaar in the Commonwealth Cup at Royal Ascot and tenth to Polydream in the Prix Maurice de Gheest at Deauville in August. At Doncaster Racecourse on 15 September he finished last of the nine runners in the Park Stakes, more than sixteen lengths behind the winner Mustashry. Fifteen days later Unfortunately was sent to Ireland for the Renaissance Stakes, which was run that year over six furlongs at Naas Racecourse. Ridden by Chris Hayes he started the 100/30 second favourite behind the veteran Gordon Lord Byron in a six-runner field which also included Fas (Prix Sigy). He started slowly but produced a strong finish to catch the front-running St Patrick's Day in the final strides and won by half a length.

== Stud record ==
Unfortunately began his career at the Cheveley Park Stud in 2019, standing at a fee of £7,500.

== Pedigree ==
Pedigree of Unfortunately (IRE), bay stallion, 2015
Sire Society Rock (IRE) 2007	Rock of Gibraltar (IRE); 1999	Danehill (USA)	Danzig
Sire Society Rock (IRE) 2007	Rock of Gibraltar (IRE); 1999	Danehill (USA)	Razyana
Sire Society Rock (IRE) 2007	Rock of Gibraltar (IRE); 1999	Offshore Boom	Be My Guest (USA)
Sire Society Rock (IRE) 2007	Rock of Gibraltar (IRE); 1999	Offshore Boom	Push A Button
Sire Society Rock (IRE) 2007	High Society (IRE); 1999	Key of Luck (USA)	Chief's Crown
Sire Society Rock (IRE) 2007	High Society (IRE); 1999	Key of Luck (USA)	Balbonella (FR)
Sire Society Rock (IRE) 2007	High Society (IRE); 1999	Elas Gold	Ela-Mana-Mou
Sire Society Rock (IRE) 2007	High Society (IRE); 1999	Elas Gold	Majestics Gold
Dam Unfortunate (GB) 1997	Komaite (USA); 1983	Nureyev	Northern Dancer (CAN)
Dam Unfortunate (GB) 1997	Komaite (USA); 1983	Nureyev	Special
Dam Unfortunate (GB) 1997	Komaite (USA); 1983	Brown Berry	Mount Marcy
Dam Unfortunate (GB) 1997	Komaite (USA); 1983	Brown Berry	Brown Baby
Dam Unfortunate (GB) 1997	Honour and Glory (GB); 1990	Hotfoot	Firestreak
Dam Unfortunate (GB) 1997	Honour and Glory (GB); 1990	Hotfoot	Pitter Patter
Dam Unfortunate (GB) 1997	Honour and Glory (GB); 1990	Cheb's Honour	Chebs Lad
Dam Unfortunate (GB) 1997	Honour and Glory (GB); 1990	Cheb's Honour	Queen's Evidence (Family: 8-f)
