= Hello Youmzain =

French-bred Thoroughbred racehorse

- Racing silks of Jaber Abdullah; Cambridge Stud
- Sire: Kodiac
- Grandsire: Danehill
- Dam: Spasha
- Damsire: Shamardal
- Sex: Colt
- Foaled: 22 April 2016
- Country: France
- Colour: Bay
- Breeder: Rabbah Bloodstock
- Owner: Jaber Abdullah; Cambridge Stud
- Trainer: Kevin Ryan
- Record: 12: 5-2-1
- Earnings: £579,974

Major wins
- Critérium de Maisons-Laffitte (2018); Sandy Lane Stakes (2019); Haydock Sprint Cup (2019); Diamond Jubilee Stakes (2020)

Hello Youmzain (foaled 22 April 2016) is a French-bred, British-trained Thoroughbred racehorse. As a two-year-old in 2018 he showed top class form to win two of his three races including the Critérium de Maisons-Laffitte. In the following year he developed into a leading sprinter, winning the Sandy Lane Stakes and running third in the Commonwealth Cup before recording his first Group 1 success in the Haydock Sprint Cup. As a four-year-old in 2020 he won the Diamond Jubilee Stakes and finished second in the Prix Maurice de Gheest.

== Background ==
Hello Youmzain is a bay colt bred in France by Rabbah Bloodstock. He raced in the colours of Jaber Abdullah, one of Rabbah Bloodstock's major partners. He was sent into training with Kevin Ryan at Hambleton, North Yorkshire. He was named after, but unrelated to, Jaber Abdullah's best horse Youmzain.

He was sired by Kodiac, a sprinter who won four minor races from twenty starts and finished second in the Hackwood Stakes and fourth in the Prix Maurice de Gheest. Like his full-brother Invincible Spirit, he became a very successful breeding stallion, siring many major winners including Tiggy Wiggy, Fairyland and Best Solution.

Hello Youmzain's dam Spasha never raced but was a successful broodmare whose other foals included the Gran Criterium winner Royal Youmzain. She was a granddaughter of Sandy Island who won the Lancashire Oaks and was a half-sister to Slip Anchor.

== Racing career ==
=== 2018: two-year-old season ===
Hello Youmzain was ridden in all of his races as a two-year-old by Kevin Stott. On 22 August at Carlisle Racecourse the colt started 9/4 favourite for a six-furlong maiden race and made a successful debut as he took the lead a furlong out and drew away to win by four lengths. Fifteen days later he ran in a novice race (for horses with no more than two previous wins) over the same distance at Haydock Park and ran second to the Roger Varian trained San Donato, beaten a short head by the winner.

On 13 October the colt was sent to France and stepped up in class to contest the Group 2 Critérium de Maisons-Laffitte over 1200 metres on soft ground and started the 6.4/1 fifth choice in an eight-runner field with his more fancied rivals being Sporting Chance (winner of the Prix Eclipse), Legends of War (second in the Gimcrack Stakes), Queen of Bermuda (Firth of Clyde Stakes) and Graignes. After tracking the leaders, Hello Youmzain went to the front 200 metres from the finish and despite hanging to the left he kept on well to win by two and a half lengths from Queen of Bermuda. Kevin Stott commented "He's still a big baby and as you could see, as soon as I hit the front he wanted to go left. I'm really looking forward to riding him next year and think he could be a very good horse".

In the official 2018 European classification for two-year-olds Hello Youmzain was given a rating of 114, making him the tenth best juvenile colt, 12 pounds behind the top-rated Too Darn Hot.

=== 2019: three-year-old season ===
James Doyle took the ride when Hello Youmzain began his second season in the Greenham Stakes, a major trial race for the 2000 Guineas, run over seven furlongs at Newbury Racecourse on 13 April. He started the 5/2 favourite but was unable to quicken in the closing stages and came home fourth of the eight runners behind Mohaather, Great Scot and Urban Icon. On 25 May the colt was dropped back in distance for the six-furlong Sandy Lane Stakes at Haydock and went off the 5/1 second favourite behind the undefeated Calyx, whose wins included the Coventry Stakes and the Pavilion Stakes. With Stott in the saddle, Hello Youmzain took the lead a furlong and a half from the finish and drew away to win by three and a quarter lengths from Calyx. After the race Stott said "This horse has been a legend for me. He ran in the Greenham and didn't stay, so we dropped him back to six. He has a lot of speed, we got a lovely tow and he quickened up well... He's a very good horse".

At Royal Ascot on 21 June Hello Youmzain was stepped up to Group 1 level for the first time and started at odds of 6/1 for the Commonwealth Cup. After racing towards the rear in the early stages he kept on well to come home third behind Advertise and the filly Forever In Dreams, with Ten Sovereigns in fourth. The colt was entered for the Nunthorpe Stakes at York Racecourse in August but was withdrawn on account of the unsuitably firm ground.

After a break of two and a half months Hello Youmzain returned on 7 September for the Group 1 Sprint Cup at Haydock, a race which saw him matched against older horse for the first time. Ridden by Doyle he was one of three 9/2 co-favourites alongside Khadeem (Stewards' Cup) and Dream of Dreams (second in the Diamond Jubilee Stakes) in an eleven-runner field which also included The Tin Man, Fairyland, Brando (Prix Maurice de Gheest), Waldpfad (Hackwood Stakes) and Invincible Army (Duke of York Stakes). In a change of tactics, Hello Youmzain led from the start and held off the late challenge of The Tin Man to win by half a length with two lengths back to Waldpfad in third. Doyle commented "He hasn't been entirely straightforward, but the engine's always been there and the whole team have done a great job to manage that and channel it all in the right direction" while Kevin Ryan said "He's such a young horse and he's a big horse. He's going to improve and strengthen. You shouldn’t wish your life away but when you see him next year, he's going to be bigger and stronger".

Shortly after his win at Haydock the colt was bought by the Cambridge Stud and the Haras d'Etreham in a private deal. On 19 October Hello Youmzain was made 6/1 third favourite behind Advertise and One Master for the British Champions Sprint Stakes over six furlongs at Ascot. Racing on heavy ground he led for most of the way after being overtaken a furlong out he faded badly and came home eighth behind the 33/1 upset winner Donjuan Triumphant.

=== 2020: four-year-old season ===
The flat racing season in Britain and Ireland was disrupted by the COVID-19 outbreak and Hello Youmzain did not make his reappearance until 20 June when he was ridden by Stott and started the 4/1 second favourite for the Diamond Jubilee Stakes which was run behind closed doors at Royal Ascot. The Irish challenger Sceptical went off favourite after an impressive win in the Woodlands Stakes while the other eight runners were Khadeem, Dream of Dreams, One Master, The Tin Man, Sands of Mali, Speak In Colours (Renaissance Stakes), Breathtaking Look (Sceptre Stakes) and Shine So Bright (City of York Stakes). Hello Youmzain started quickly and disputed the lead for most of the way before being headed by Khadeem and Sceptical approaching the final furlong. He rallied strongly in the closing stages and regained the advantage to win by a head from the fast-finishing Dream of Dreams. After the race Stott commented "I feel blessed to be back on him after his change of ownership. I can't describe how thankful I am. It means everything. Kevin gave me a lot of confidence going out riding him. Fair play to the horse. He dug deep when I needed him and deserves all the credit, not me" while Kevin Ryan's son Adam said "He's done it the hard way but he was very impressive. He did well over the winter, matured again and his work's been good. We always thought he might be the finished article and it's great for the team".

In the July Cup over six furlongs at Newmarket on 11 July Hello Youmzain started the 9/2 third favourite behind Golden Horde and Sceptical, but after appearing to have every chance entering the last quarter mile he faded in the closing stages and came home fifth of the twelve runners, beaten four lengths by the winner Oxted. The colt reappeared in the Prix Maurice de Gheest over 1300 metres at Deauville Racecourse in August. He disputed the lead from the start and gained the advantage inside the last 200 metres but was overtaken in the final strides and beaten half a length into second place by Space Blues. When he attempted to repeat his 2019 success in the Haydock Sprint Cup on 5 September Hello Youmzain finished fifth of the thirteen runners behind Dream of Dreams, beaten three and three quarter lengths by the winner.

In the 2020 World's Best Racehorse Rankings, Hello Youmzain was rated on 118, making him the equal 80th best racehorse in the world.

== Stud career ==
After his retirement from racing in October 2020 Hello Youmzain became a breeding stallion at the Haras d'Etreham in Normandy. He also commenced shuttling to New Zealand's Cambridge Stud in 2021. His first southern bred yearling to be consigned for sale was knocked down for $325,000 ($AUS) at the 2024 Magic Millions Premiere Yearling Sale.

== Pedigree ==
Pedigree of Hello Youmzain (FR), bay colt, 2016
Sire Kodiac (GB) 2001	Danehill (USA); 1986	Danzig	Northern Dancer (CAN)
Sire Kodiac (GB) 2001	Danehill (USA); 1986	Danzig	Pas de Nom
Sire Kodiac (GB) 2001	Danehill (USA); 1986	Razyana	His Majesty
Sire Kodiac (GB) 2001	Danehill (USA); 1986	Razyana	Spring Adieu (CAN)
Sire Kodiac (GB) 2001	Rafha (GB); 1987	Kris	Sharpen Up
Sire Kodiac (GB) 2001	Rafha (GB); 1987	Kris	Doubly Sure
Sire Kodiac (GB) 2001	Rafha (GB); 1987	Eljazzi (IRE)	Artaius (USA)
Sire Kodiac (GB) 2001	Rafha (GB); 1987	Eljazzi (IRE)	Border Bounty (GB)
Dam Spasha (GB) 2008	Shamardal (USA); 2002	Giant's Causeway	Storm Cat
Dam Spasha (GB) 2008	Shamardal (USA); 2002	Giant's Causeway	Mariah's Storm
Dam Spasha (GB) 2008	Shamardal (USA); 2002	Helsinki (GB)	Machiavellian (USA)
Dam Spasha (GB) 2008	Shamardal (USA); 2002	Helsinki (GB)	Helen Street
Dam Spasha (GB) 2008	Spa (GB); 1995	Sadler's Wells (USA)	Northern Dancer (CAN)
Dam Spasha (GB) 2008	Spa (GB); 1995	Sadler's Wells (USA)	Fairy Bridge
Dam Spasha (GB) 2008	Spa (GB); 1995	Sandy Island	Mill Reef (USA)
Dam Spasha (GB) 2008	Spa (GB); 1995	Sandy Island	Sayonara (GER) (Family: 16-c)

- Hello Youmzain was inbred 4 × 4 to Northern Dancer, meaning that this stallions appears twice in the fourth generation of his pedigree.
