= Sands of Mali =

French-bred Thoroughbred racehorse

- Racing silks of The Cool Silk Partnership
- Sire: Panis
- Grandsire: Miswaki
- Dam: Kadiania
- Damsire: Indian Rocket
- Sex: Colt
- Foaled: 10 April 2015
- Country: France
- Colour: Bay
- Breeder: Simon Urizzi
- Owner: Cool Silk Partnership
- Trainer: Richard Fahey
- Record: 18: 5-1-1
- Earnings: £726,919

Major wins
- Gimcrack Stakes (2017); Prix Sigy (2018); Sandy Lane Stakes (2018); British Champions Sprint Stakes (2018)

Sands of Mali, (foaled 10 April 2015) is a French-bred, British-trained Thoroughbred racehorse. In a career which ran from July 2017 to July 2020 he ran eighteen times and won five of his races. In 2017 he was one of the best two-year-old colts in Europe, winning two races including the Gimcrack Stakes. In the following spring, he established himself as a top class sprinter, taking the Prix Sigy and Sandy Lane Stakes before being narrowly defeated in the Commonwealth Cup. He ran poorly in late summer, but returned to form in autumn to record his biggest win in the British Champions Sprint Stakes. He failed to win in six races in 2019 and 2020 and was retired to stud in August 2020.

== Background ==
Sands of Mali is a dark bay colt with no white markings bred in France by Simon Urizzi. In September 2016 the yearling was consigned to the Osarus sale at La Teste-de-Buch, and sold for €20,000 to the bloodstock agent Con Marnane. The colt was put up for auction again in April 2017 at Ascot when he was entered in a "breeze-up" sale, in which horses are publicly galloped before being sold. He was bought for £75,000 by Peter Swann's Cool Silk Partnership and sent into training with Richard Fahey at Musley Bank in North Yorkshire. He has been ridden in most of his races by Paul Hanagan.

Sands of Mali is the most successful racehorse sired by Panis, an American-bred stallion who was trained in France, where he won the Prix de Condé and the Prix Messidor. Sands of Mali's dam Kadiania was an unraced mare who was gifted to Simon Urizzi by his former employer Yann Loizeau. She was a distant female-line descendant of the influential British broodmare Phase.

== Racing career ==
=== 2017: two-year-old season ===
On his racecourse debut Sands of Mali was ridden by David Nolan when he finished seventh in a minor race over six furlongs at York Racecourse on 15 July. Eighteen later he started at odds of 5/1 for a similar event on soft ground at Nottingham Racecourse and recorded his first success as he won by three and three quarter lengths from Eirene with a gap of thirteen lengths back to the other five runners. On 26 August the colt was stepped up in class for the Group 2 Gimcrack Stakes at York and started a 14/1 outsider in a ten-runner field. His opponents included Cardsharp (July Stakes), Headway (second in the Coventry Stakes), Invincible Army (second in the Molecomb Stakes) and Nebo (second in the Richmond Stakes). Sands of Mali took the lead from the start and kept on well in the closing stages to win by two and three quarter lengths from Invincible Army. Paul Hanagan commented "He's a bit inexperienced, but he pinged the gates and showed a great cruising speed. He took some pulling up. I think this year is just a bonus with him, he's only going to improve".

In the Group 1 Middle Park Stakes at Newmarket Racecourse Sands of Mali was made the 9/2 second choice in the betting but, in a rough race, he never looked likely to win and came home last of the twelve runners behind U S Navy Flag. For his final run of the year the colt was sent to California to contest the Breeders' Cup Juvenile Turf over one mile at Del Mar Racetrack on 3 November. Ridden by Flavien Prat he led for most of the way but faded in the straight to finish ninth behind Mendelssohn, beaten three and a half lengths by the winner.

In the official European Classification for 2017, Sands of Mali was rated the sixth-best two-year-old of the season, six pounds behind the top-rated U S Navy Flag.

=== 2018: three-year-old season ===
Sands of Mali began his second campaign with a trip to France for the Group 3 Prix Sigy over 1200 metres on heavy ground at Chantilly Racecourse on 13 April and started 4/1 third choice in the betting behind the Prix Yacowlef winner Absolute City and the Prix Thomas Bryon runner-up Alba Power. After racing in second place behind Forza Capitolino he took the lead at half way but was headed by the same rival 300 metres out. He rallied to regain the advantage in the closing stages and won by a short neck from the outsider Alistair. Fahey said "It was a solid performance, he gave plenty of weight all round and did a professional job on them. There's still plenty of improvement in him". The colt returned to England for the Group 2 Sandy Lane Stakes at Haydock Park on 28 May and started second favourite to Invincible Army in an eight-runner field which also included James Garfield (Mill Reef Stakes), Heartache (Queen Mary Stakes, Flying Childers Stakes), Barraquero (Richmond Stakes), Unfortunately (Prix Morny) and Actress (Anglesey Stakes). Sands of Mali led from the start and got the better of a "sustained duel" with Invincible Army over the final furlong to win by a short head. After the race Fahey commented "He's a very fast horse, we'd love to get a lead with him but nothing was quick enough today. He looked like he was going to win comfortably today, but Paul said he pricked his ears. I'd have settled for a dead-heat, I must admit. It took Paul ages to pull him up, I wouldn't mind trying him over further eventually as he doesn't look like a sprinter".

On 22 June Sands of Mali was stepped up to Group 1 class to contest the Commonwealth Cup at Royal Ascot and was made the 15/2 fourth choice in a field of 22 three-year-olds. Racing up the stands side of the course (the left side from the jockeys' view) he looked beaten two furlongs out but then made rapid progress despite hanging to the right and finished second, beaten half a length by Eqtidaar. Sands of Mali ran poorly in his next two races, finishing towards the rear in both the July Cup at Newmarket Racecourse (won by U S Navy Flag) and the Prix Maurice de Gheest at Deauville Racecourse in August. Fahey later commented "it all went pear-shaped. When you believe in a horse and it doesn't happen, it's frustrating. We were scratching our heads, we did scopes and checked his heart and couldn't find anything". The colt produced a better effort in the 32Red Sprint Cup Stakes on heavy ground at Haydock on 8 September when he came home fifth behind the six-year-old The Tin Man.

In the Group 1 British Champions Sprint Stakes over six furlongs at Ascot on 20 October Sands of Mali started a 28/1 outsider in a field of fourteen. The Tin Man started favourite while the other contenders included Harry Angel, Limato, Librisa Breeze (winner of the race in 2017), Brando (Prix Maurice de Gheest), Tasleet (Duke of York Stakes), Sir Dancealot (Lennox Stakes) and Donjuan Triumphant (Critérium de Maisons-Laffitte). Sands of Mali took the lead from the start and kept on well under pressure in the closing stages to win "readily" by a length from Harry Angel. Hanagan said "We've been raving about how good he was all season, and it's just great he's shown it on the big stage. I just loved the way he picked up again when Harry Angel came to challenge. I've been lucky enough to ride some very good horses, but I rate him up there with the best of them, and I'm hoping there's more improvement when he strengthens up a bit more".

Before the end of the year Sands of Mali was bought for an undisclosed sum by Phoenix Thoroughbreds.

In the 2018 World's Best Racehorse Rankings Sands of Mali was given a rating of 118, making him the 78th best horse in the world.

=== 2019: four-year-old season ===
For his first run of 2019 Sands of Mali was sent to the United Arab Emirates to contest the Al Quoz Sprint over 1200 metres at Meydan Racecourse. Started the 8/1 third choice in the betting but came home sixth of the thirteen runners behind Blue Point. On his return to Europe he ran third to Brando and Donjuan Triumphant in the ungraded Clyde Stakes at Hamilton Park Racecourse, a race for which he started the even money favourite. At Royal Ascot in June he made little impact as he finished towards the rear of the field behind Blue Point in the Diamond Jubilee Stakes. On his only other run of the year he attempted to repeat his 2018 success in the British Champions Sprint Stakes but finished unplaced behind Donjuan Triumphant after losing a shoe in the race.

=== 2020: five-year-old season ===
Sands of Mali ran twice in 2020, beaten into eighth place in the Diamond Jubilee Stakes behind Hello Youmzain before finishing fourth in a minor race at Haydock Park on his final start. In August he was retired to stud and will stand at the Ballyhane Stud in Ireland. His co-owner Peter Swann said "He's been a fantastic servant to us...he's a beautiful-looking horse, big and strong – a perfect stallion –and we hope we can get some future success from his progeny."

== Pedigree ==
Pedigree of Sands of Mali (FR), bay colt, 2015
| Sire Panis (USA) 1998 | Miswaki; 1978 | Mr. Prospector | Raise a Native |
| Sire Panis (USA) 1998 | Miswaki; 1978 | Mr. Prospector | Gold Digger |
| Sire Panis (USA) 1998 | Miswaki; 1978 | Hopespringseternal | Buckpasser |
| Sire Panis (USA) 1998 | Miswaki; 1978 | Hopespringseternal | Rose Bower |
| Sire Panis (USA) 1998 | Political Parody; 1986 | Doonesbury | Mastadoon |
| Sire Panis (USA) 1998 | Political Parody; 1986 | Doonesbury | Vaguely Nice |
| Sire Panis (USA) 1998 | Political Parody; 1986 | Urakawa | Roberto |
| Sire Panis (USA) 1998 | Political Parody; 1986 | Urakawa | Miss Devereux |
| Dam Kadiania (FR) 2005 | Indian Rocket (GB); 1994 | Indian Ridge (IRE) | Ahonoora (GB) |
| Dam Kadiania (FR) 2005 | Indian Rocket (GB); 1994 | Indian Ridge (IRE) | Hillbrow (GB) |
| Dam Kadiania (FR) 2005 | Indian Rocket (GB); 1994 | Selvi | Mummys Pet |
| Dam Kadiania (FR) 2005 | Indian Rocket (GB); 1994 | Selvi | Sarong |
| Dam Kadiania (FR) 2005 | Kapi Creek; 1992 | Sicyos (USA) | Lyphard |
| Dam Kadiania (FR) 2005 | Kapi Creek; 1992 | Sicyos (USA) | Sigy (FR) |
| Dam Kadiania (FR) 2005 | Kapi Creek; 1992 | Kirigane | Vitiges |
| Dam Kadiania (FR) 2005 | Kapi Creek; 1992 | Kirigane | Kashmiri Song (Family: 21-a) |
