= Harry Rosebery Stakes =

Flat horse race in Britain

- Class: Listed
- Location: Ayr Racecourse; Ayr, Scotland
- Race type: Flat / Thoroughbred
- Sponsor: British EBF Stallions
- Website: Ayr

Race information
- Distance: 5f (1,006 metres)
- Surface: Turf
- Track: Straight
- Qualification: Two-year-olds
- Weight: 9 st 5 lb; Allowances 5 lb for fillies and mares Penalties; 5 lb for Group winners 3 lb for Listed winners
- Purse: £35,500 (2025); 1st: £20,132

Harry Rosebery Stakes
2026
Mussab	Dubai Champion	Dance A Jig

Previous years
2025
Chairmanfourtimes	Our Cody	Arduis Invicta
2024
Star Of Mehmas	Uncle Don	Coto De Caza
2023
Beautiful Diamond	Purosangue	Bombay Bazaar
2022
Prince Of Pillo	Bolt Action	Remarkable Force
2021
Vertiginous	Mitbaahy	Geocentric

2020-2011
2020
Winter Power	Nomadic Empire	First Company
2019
Piece of Paradise	Lady Penelope	Ickworth
2018
Dave Dexter	Vintage Brut	Secret Venture
2016
Clem Fandango	Angel Meadow	Smokey Lane
2015
Quiet Reflection	Field of Vision	Promised Money
2014
Accipiter	Mind Of Madness	Squats
2013
Hurryupharriet	Mecca's Angel	Umneyati
2012
Garswood	Zoola	Boston Rocker
2011
Caledonia Lady	Hexagonal	Son Du Silence

2010-2001
2010
Arctic Feeling	Krypton Factor	The Thrill Is Gone
2009
Mister Manannan	Puff	Aalsmeer
2008
Magic Cat	Total Gallery	Salsa Star
2007
Captain Gerrard	Look Busy	Carleton
2006
Alzerra	Holdin Foldin	Mood Music
2005
Curtail	Campbeltown	Tabaret
2004
Prince Charming	Mary Read	Dance Night
2003
Boogie Street	Nights Cross	Moss Vale
2002
Bella Tusa	Membership	Tilak
2001
Irish Vale	Master Robbie	Captain Rio

2000-1991
2000
Vicious Dancer	Red Millennium	Elsie Plunkett
1999
Khasayl	Tara's Girl	Seven No Trumps
1998
Monkston Point	Pips Magic	Astonished
1997
Halmahera	Its All Relative	Friar Tuck
1996
Conspiracy	Superior Premium	Snap Crackle Pop
1995
Westcourt Magic	Kunucu	Tadeo
1994
Lago Di Varano	Musical Season	Seigneurial
1993
Palacegate Jack	Pinkerton's Pal	Bid For Blue
1992
Fyfield Flyer	Lord Olivier	Willshe Gan
1991
Miss Nosey Parker	Regal Chimes	Cindora

1990-1988
1990
Heard A Whisper	Sir Harry Hardman	Food Of Love
1989
Mademoiselle Chloe	Tadwin	La Galerie
1988
Petrillia	That's The One	Almost Blue

The Harry Rosebery Stakes is a Listed flat horse race in Great Britain open to horses aged two years. It is run at Ayr over a distance of 5 furlongs (1,006 metres), and it is scheduled to take place each year in September. It is currently held on the second day of Ayr's three-day Ayr Gold Cup Festival (previously the Western Meeting). The race is named after Harry Primrose, 6th Earl of Rosebery, a notable racehorse owner of the twentieth century.

== Winners ==
Year	Winner	Jockey	Trainer	Time
1977	Manor Farm Boy	Mark Birch	Bill O'Gorman	0:59.71
1978	Abdu	Pat Eddery	Bill O'Gorman	1:02.93
1979	Lucinda Light	Paul Tulk	Brian Swift	1:04.74
1980	Tinas Pet	Mick Miller	Geoff Huffer	1:02.77
1981	Jester	Steve Cauthen	Barry Hills	1:00.03
1982	Jonacris	Mick Miller	Paul Felgate	1:01.53
1983	Petorius	Walter Swinburn	Michael Stoute	1:02.60
1984	Melody Park	Philip Robinson	Mick Ryan	1:01.21
1985	Abandoned due to waterlogging
1986	Singing Steven	Willie Carson	Richard Hannon Sr.	0:58.73
1987	Inchmurrin	Paul Eddery	Geoff Wragg	1:02.04
1988	Petrillia	Michael Hills	Barry Hills	1:02.62
1989	Mademoiselle Chloe	Kevin Hodgson	C B B Booth	1:02.02
1990	Heard A Whisper	Paul Eddery	Geoff Lewis	1:01.77
1991	Miss Nosey Parker	Willie Carson	Richard Hannon Sr.	0:58.72
1992	Fyfield Flyer	Darryll Holland	Peter Chapple-Hyam	1:01.44
1993	Palacegate Jack	John Carroll	Jack Berry	0:57.84
1994	Lago di Varano	John Carroll	Jack Berry	1:02.45
1995	Westcourt Magic	Michael Kinane	Mick Easterby	0:59.16
1996	Conspiracy	Kevin Darley	John Dunlop	0:57.62
1997	Halmahera	Martin Dwyer	Ian Balding	1:00.00
1998	Monkston Point	Jason Weaver	David Arbuthnot	1:01.78
1999	Khasayl	Richard Hills	Peter Walwyn	1:01.31
2000	Vicious Dancer	Dean McKeown	Richard Whitaker	1:02.12
2001	Irish Vale	Mark Tebbutt	Martyn Meade	1:00.17
2002	Bella Tusa	Seb Sanders	Chris Wall	0:59.79
2003	Boogie Street	Richard Hughes	Richard Hannon Sr.	0:56.98
2004	Prince Charming	Joe Fanning	John Gosden	1:00.85
2005	Curtail	Tom Eaves	Ian Semple	0:59.27
2006	Alzerra	Tony Culhane	Mick Channon	1:00.72
2007	Captain Gerrard	Tom Eaves	Bryan Smart	1:00.71
2008	Magic Cat	Adrian Elliott	Karl Burke	1:01.97
2009	Mister Manannan	Adrian Nicholls	David Nicholls	0:57.40
2010	Arctic Feeling	Paul Hanagan	Richard Fahey	0:59.35
2011	Caledonia Lady	Paul Hanagan	Jo Hughes	1:00.98
2012	Garswood	Tony Hamilton	Richard Fahey	1:02.94
2013	Hurryupharriet	Tom Eaves	Willie McCreery	1:01.22
2014	Accipiter	Ashley Morgan	Chris Wall	0:58.28
2015	Quiet Reflection	Graham Lee	Karl Burke	0:58.21
2016	Clem Fandango	Phillip Makin	Keith Dalgleish	1:00.72
2017	Abandoned due to waterlogging
2018	Dave Dexter	Graham Lee	Ralph Beckett	1:04.06
2019	Piece Of Paradise	Chris Hayes	Fozzy Stack	0:57.79
2020	Winter Power	David Allan	Tim Easterby	1:00.02
2021	Vertiginous	Paul Mulrennan	Brian Meehan	0:56.89
2022	Prince Of Pillo	Callum Rodriguez	Keith Dalgleish	0:58.82
2023	Beautiful Diamond	Clifford Lee	Karl Burke	0:59.46
2024	Star of Mehmas	Billy Loughnane	Richard Hughes	0:56.79
2025	Chairmanfourtimes	Oisin McSweeney	Adrian Paul Keatley	1:02.10
2026	Mussab	Oisin Orr	Richard & Peter Fahey	1:01.64

== See also ==
- Horse racing in Great Britain
- List of British flat horse races
