= Sandy Lane Stakes =

Flat horse race in Britain

- Class: Group 2
- Location: Haydock Park
- Race type: Flat
- Sponsor: Betfred
- Website: Haydock Park

Race information
- Distance: 6 furlongs (1,207 metres)
- Surface: Turf
- Track: Straight
- Qualification: Three-years-old
- Weight: 9 stone 2 lb Allowances; 3 lb for fillies Penalties; 5 lb for Group 1 winners* /3 lb for Group 2 winners* *after 31 August 2024
- Purse: £125,000 (2024); 1st: £70,888

Sandy Lane Stakes
2026
Venetian Sun	Division	Spicy Marg

Previous years
2025
Symbol Of Honour	Arabian Dusk	First Instinct
2024
Inisherin	Orne	Vandeek
2023
Little Big Bear	Shouldvebeenaring	Bradsell
2022
El Caballo	Flaming Rib	Wings Of War
2021
Rohaan	Dragon Symbol	Umm Kulthum

2020-2011
2019
Hello Youmzain	Calyx	Royal Intervention
2018
Sands Of Mali	Invincible Army	Emblazoned
2017
Harry Angel	Second Thought	Mubtasim
2016
Quiet Reflection	Donjuan Triumphant	Gifted Master
2015
Adaay	Limato	New Providence
2014
Aeolus	Betimes	Parbold
2013
Professor	Glass Office	Mar Mar
2012
Slade Power	Es Que Love	Lethal Force
2011
Show Rainbow	March On Beetroot	Sweet Cecily

2010-2001
2010
Bewitched	Rainfall	Mister Manannan
2009
Danehill Destiny	Doncaster Rover	Damien
2008
Fat Boy	Tajdeef	Swiss Franc
2007
Prime Defender	Hoh Mike	City of Tribes
2006
Skhilling Spirit	Guto	Green Park
2005
Camacho	Nufoos	Josh
2004
Moss Vale	Boogie Street	High Voltage
2003
The Kiddykid	Coconut Penang	Brantwood
2002
Whitbarrow	Kelsey Rose	Parisian Elegance
2001
Firebolt	Palanzo	Orientor

2000-1991
2000
Lincoln Dancer	Presentation	Don't Surrender
1999
Cubism	Munjiz	Pips Magic
1998
Eastern Purple	Jimmy Too	Pool Music
1997
Tomba	Man Howa	Connemara
1996
Farhana	April The Eighth	Dashing Blue
1995
Star Tulip	Lennox Lewis	Zeb
1994
Mary Hinge	Petula	Numbered Account
1993
Look Who's Here	Celestial Key	Southern Memories
1992
Prince Ferdinand	Central City	Wilde Rufo
1991
Lee Artiste	Cloche D'Or	Vintage Only

1990-1988
1990
Flower Girl	Haunting Beauty	Sheer Precocity
1989
Kerrera	Thorn Dance	Vague Dancer
1988
Posada	Blues Indigo	Ajuga

The Sandy Lane Stakes is a Group 2 flat horse race in Great Britain open to horses aged three years only. It is run at Haydock Park over a distance of 6 furlongs (1,207 metres), and it is scheduled to take place each year in late May or early June.

The race had Listed status prior to 2015. It was raised to Group 2 level as part of a set of changes to sprint races in Great Britain.

== Winners ==
Year	Winner	Jockey	Trainer	Time
1976	Ubedizzy	Tony Ives	Steve Nesbitt	1:16.67
1977	Mandrake Major	Eddie Hide	Denys Smith	1:13.43
1978	Skyliner	Brian Taylor	Ryan Price	1:14.73
1979	Devon Ditty	Greville Starkey	Harry Thomson Jones	1:18.81
1980	Sayyef	Tony Ives	Bill O'Gorman	1:13.77
1981	Marwell	Walter Swinburn	Michael Stoute	1:20.14
1982	Not For Show	Greville Starkey	Guy Harwood	1:12.59
1983	On Stage	Willie Carson	Bill O'Gorman	1:24.92
1984	Forzando	Bruce Raymond	Michael Jarvis	1:13.30
1985	Sharp Romance	Simon Whitworth	Paul Kelleway	1:16.72
1986	Bridesmaid	Richard Hills	Barry Hills	1:17.11
1987	Gayane	Willie Ryan	Henry Cecil	1:11.91
1988	Posada	John Reid	Fulke Johnson Houghton	1:12.11
1989	Kerrera	Pat Eddery	Michael Stoute	1:11.58
1990	Flower Girl	Basil Marcus	Harry Thomson Jones	1:12.37
1991	Lee Artiste	Geoff Baxter	Paul Cole	1:15.67
1992	Prince Ferdinand	John Reid	Matt McCormack	1:10.85
1993	Look Who's Here	George Duffield	Bryan McMahon	1:14.74
1994	Mary Hinge	Paul Eddery	Julie Cecil	1:12.43
1995	Star Tulip	George Duffield	John Dunlop	1:13.61
1996	Farhana	Richard Hills	William Jarvis	1:16.22
1997	Tomba	Dean McKeown	Brian Meehan	1:14.30
1998	Eastern Purple	John Carroll	Richard Fahey	1:14.22
1999	Cubism	Matthew Henry	John Hills	1:12.70
2000	Lincoln Dancer	Michael Roberts	Michael Jarvis	1:16.76
2001	Firebolt	Ted Durcan	Mark Tompkins	1:13.41
2002	Whitbarrow	Jamie Spencer	Rod Millman	1:13.99
2003	The Kiddykid	George Duffield	P D Evans	1:19.78
2004	Moss Vale	Kevin Darley	Barry Hills	1:12.11
2005	Camacho	Richard Hughes	Henry Cecil	1:11.12
2006	Skhilling Spirit	Jamie Spencer	David Barron	1:17.68
2007	Prime Defender	Michael Hills	Barry Hills	1:12.19
2008	Fat Boy	Tom Queally	Peter Chapple-Hyam	1:13.15
2009	Danehill Destiny	Ryan Moore	William Haggas	1:12.21
2010	Bewitched	Kieren Fallon	Charles O'Brien	1:13.73
2011	Show Rainbow	Jamie Spencer	Mick Channon	1:13.88
2012	Slade Power	Wayne Lordan	Edward Lynam	1:11.17
2013	Professor	Pat Dobbs	Richard Hannon Sr.	1:11.09
2014	Aeolus	Richard Hughes	Ed McMahon	1:14.22
2015	Adaay	Paul Hanagan	William Haggas	1:13.22
2016	Quiet Reflection	Dougie Costello	Karl Burke	1:10.57
2017	Harry Angel	Adam Kirby	Clive Cox	1:08.56
2018	Sands of Mali	Paul Hanagan	Richard Fahey	1:09.53
2019	Hello Youmzain	Kevin Stott	Kevin Ryan	1:12.13
	no race 2020 (Note: The 2020 running was cancelled because of the COVID-19 pandemic in the United Kingdom)
2021	Rohaan	Shane Kelly	David Evans	1:18.15
2022	El Caballo	Clifford Lee	Karl Burke	1:11.76
2023	Little Big Bear	Frankie Dettori	Aidan O'Brien	1:11.39
2024	Inisherin	Tom Eaves	Kevin Ryan	1:12.77
2025	Symbol Of Honour	William Buick	Charlie Appleby	1:12.18
2026	Venetian Sun	Clifford Lee	Karl Burke	1:13.46

== See also ==
- Horse racing in Great Britain
- List of British flat horse races
