= Quiet Reflection =

British-bred Thoroughbred racehorse

- Racing silks of Ontoawinner Syndicate
- Sire: Showcasing
- Grandsire: Oasis Dream
- Dam: My Delirium
- Damsire: Haafhd
- Sex: Mare
- Foaled: 19 February 2013
- Country: United Kingdom
- Colour: Bay
- Breeder: Springcombe Park Stud
- Owner: Ontoawinner Syndicate
- Trainer: Karl Burke
- Record: 13: 8-0-1
- Earnings: £656,953

Major wins
- Harry Rosebery Stakes (2015); Cornwallis Stakes (2015); Prix Sigy (2016); Sandy Lane Stakes (2016); Commonwealth Cup (2016); Haydock Sprint Cup (2016); Renaissance Stakes (2017)

Awards
- Cartier Champion Sprinter (2016); Yorkshire Horse of the Year (2016)

Quiet Reflection (foaled 19 February 2013) is a retired British Thoroughbred racehorse. A specialist sprinter with a preference for soft ground, she showed very good form as a two-year-old in 2015 when she won three of her four races including the Harry Rosebery Stakes and the Cornwallis Stakes. In the following year she established herself as one of the best sprinters in Europe with wins in the Prix Sigy, Sandy Lane Stakes, Commonwealth Cup and Haydock Sprint Cup. All of her victories have come against male opposition. In November 2016 became the first three-year-old filly to be named Cartier Champion Sprinter. She was retired after the 2017 British Champions Sprint.

== Background ==
Quiet Reflection is a bay mare with a white blaze and a white sock on her right hind leg. She was bred by the Springcombe Park Stud, a stud farm on the borders of Somerset and Wiltshire which was founded by Paul Gardner in 2007 on the site of an old dairy farm. Gardner later admitted that his decision to sell Quiet Reflection was "probably a big mistake". As a yearling the filly was auctioned at the Goffs Doncaster Silver Sale on 28 August 2014 and was bought for £32,000 by Geoffrey Howson Bloodstock. In April 2015 the filly was entered in a "breeze up" sale (in which the horses are publicly galloped before being sold) at Doncaster and was bought for £44,000 by the trainer Karl Burke. Burke sold a half share to the Ontoawinner syndicate and a 35% share to Hubert Strecker, retaining a 15% share for himself. The filly went into training with Burke at Middleham in North Yorkshire. Quiet Reflection has suffered from fragile hooves and has received regular treatment from the specialist farrier Andy Grant.

Quiet Reflection was from the second crop of foals sired by Showcasing, a stallion who won two of his seven races including the 2009 edition of the Gimcrack Stakes. He made a very promising start to his stud career, also siring Toocoolforschool (Mill Reef Stakes), Prize Exhibit (San Clemente Handicap), Tasleet (Greenham Stakes) and Cappella Sansevero (Round Tower Stakes). Quiet Reflection's dam My Delirium recorded her only success in eight races when she won a maiden race at Newmarket Racecourse in October 2010 at odds of 80/1. She was descended from the American broodmare Annie Aaron, a half-sister to Alysheba.

== Racing career ==
=== 2015: two-year-old season ===
On 16 July 2015 Quiet Reflection began her racing career in a five furlong maiden race at Hamilton Park Racecourse in which she started 2/1 second favourite in a six-runner field of colts and fillies. Ridden by the apprentice jockey Joey Haynes she went to the front approaching the final furlong and accelerated clear to win by five lengths. The Racing Post described the performance (achieved on good to soft ground) as "promising". The filly was then moved up sharply in class to contest the Group Two Lowther Stakes at York Racecourse on 20 August when she was again partnered by Haynes. After tracking the leaders she could make no impression in the last quarter mile and finished fifth behind the William Haggas-trained Betharah.

Graham Lee took over from Haynes when Quiet the filly was sent to Scotland for the Listed Harry Rosebery Stakes at Ayr Racecourse on 18 September. Easton Angel, who had finished third in the Lowther Stakes was made the odds-on favourite with Quiet Reflection the 8/1 second choice in a sixteen-runner field. Field of Vision set the pace before Quiet Reflection took the lead inside the final furlong and quickly drew away to win by four lengths. Karl Burke commented "She's a good filly. She was knocked over after 100 yards which not many people picked up on in the Lowther... Unfortunately I took her out of the Cheveley Park after the Lowther and I wouldn't have minded having a crack at that after today."

In the Cornwallis Stakes at Ascot Racecourse on 9 October the filly started 5/6 favourite, with Field of Vision being the best-fancied of her ten opponents. After looking outpaced in the early stages she was sent into the lead by Lee a furlong out and went clear to beat Field of Vision "readily" by two and a half lengths.

=== 2016: three-year-old season ===
==== Spring ====
The former National Hunt jockey Dougie Costello took over as Quiet Reflection's regular jockey in 2016. She began her second season with a trip to France for the Group Three Prix Sigy over 1200 metres at Chantilly Racecourse on 10 April and started the 7/2 second favourite behind the Jean-Claude Rouget-trained Saryshagann. Racing on heavy ground she took a clear advantage 200 metres from the finish but was hard-pressed in the closing strides before winning by a head from Jimmy Two Times. Burke commented "We have learned something there because she probably hit the front too soon. I thought we had it won easily and then when the camera angle changed and there was another 200 metres to run, I slightly had my heart in my mouth".

On her next start the filly returned to Group Two class for the first time since the Lowther when she ran in the Sandy Lane Stakes on 28 May at Haydock Park. Gifted Master (Pavilion Stakes) started favourite ahead of Buratino (Coventry Stakes) and La Rioja (Dick Poole Stakes) with Quiet Reflection on 7/1 alongside Donjuan Triumphant (Critérium de Maisons-Laffitte). After being restrained by Costello in the early stages she took the lead a furlong out and drew clear in "impressive" style to win by three and three quarter lengths. Costello said that the filly won in a "hack canter", whilst Burke commented "She's a different filly to the one that won in France [in April]. She's physically matured since then and I knew she'd improved. It wasn't the idea to sit that far back but when I saw him cruise up on her two out, I thought he'd gone too soon. She's got a fantastic turn of foot and a high cruising speed and when you put them together, it makes something special".

==== Summer ====
At Royal Ascot on 17 June Quiet Reflection started 7/4 favourite for the second running of the Commonwealth Cup. Donjuan Triumphant and La Rioja were again in opposition, whilst the other seven runners included Log Out Island (Carnarvon Stakes), Cheikeljack (Prix Djebel), Washington, D.C. (Windsor Castle Stakes), Kachy (Molecomb Stakes), Illuminate (Duchess of Cambridge Stakes) and Waterloo Bridge (Norfolk Stakes). After racing just behind the leaders Quiet Reflection began a strong late run a furlong out, overtook Kachy in the last 100 yards and won by a length. After the race Burke said "Quiet Reflection is a very good filly. It was not the plan to be stuck in the middle like that and I was praying we didn’t get a rough race. When she comes through she has a great turn of foot and it has got her out of trouble again."

Three weeks after her win at Ascot, the filly was matched against older sprinters in the Group One July Cup over six furlongs on good-to-firm ground at Newmarket. Starting the 7/1 third choice in an 18-runner field she stayed on in the closing stages but was beaten into third place by the geldings Limato and Suedois.

==== Autumn ====
On 3 September Quiet Reflection returned to the scene of her Sandy Lane Stakes victory when she contested the 32Red Sprint Cup and started 7/2 favourite after Limato was withdrawn on account of the soft ground. Suedois, Kachy and Donjuam Triumphant were again in opposition, whilst the other runners were Magical Memory (Duke of York Stakes), The Tin Man (Hackwood Stakes), Dancing Star (Stewards' Cup), Only Mine (Lacken Stakes), Gordon Lord Byron (winner of the race in 2013), Goken (Prix du Bois), Mehronissa (Flying Fillies' Stakes), Strath Burn (Hackwood Stakes), Jane's Memory (Cecil Frail Stakes) and Mr Lupton. Costello positioned the favourite in mid-division before making "smooth" progress to take the lead approaching the final furlong. Quiet Reflection went clear and won by one and three quarter lengths from The Tin Man, with Suedois two and a half lengths back in third place. Costello commented "I've never ridden anything like it and probably never will again. She's push-button go. She won as she liked, she's the real deal." Burke said "I know we wanted a bit of rain but I was a bit worried when it got this soft as I thought it might play into the hands of the older horses. She's just got speed to burn. She travels well and is so relaxed. She blows when she works but when she runs she doesn't turn a hair". He later said that the filly would probably run next in the British Champions Sprint Stakes at Ascot.

In the British Champions Sprint Stakes on 15 October Quiet Reflection started the 4/1 joint favourite in a thirteen-runner field. Racing on good ground she tracked the leaders but was unable to accelerate in the last quarter mile and finished seventh behind The Tin Man, beaten four and a half lengths by the winner. Following the race, Burke announced that Quiet Reflection would remain in training for 2017, stating "... she came home fine and she will be back next year, she definitely stays in training. We will sit down with the owners in the next few weeks and plan a campaign for next season; there is plenty to look forward to." The Al Quoz Sprint on Dubai World Cup Night was mooted as a possible early-season target for the filly.

=== 2017: four-year-old season ===
Martin Harley rode Quiet Reflection in all three of her starts as a four-year-old. On her seasonal debut the filly came home tenth of the twelve runners behind Priceless in the Temple Stakes at Haydock on 27 May. After a break of almost four months she returned in the Listed Renaissance Stakes over six furlongs on soft ground at Naas Racecourse on 24 September and went off the 5/2 favourite against nine opponents. She raced in mid-division before overtaking the front-running Alphabet 150 yards from the finish and drew away to win "comfortably" by two and three quarter lengths. Burke commented "On soft ground this filly is very good and she can only sharpen up for that run. Win, lose or draw she has been an absolute star for us, and it's just great to get her back. She has a great temperament and has been a pleasure to be around."

On her final appearance Quiet Reflection finished tenth in the 2017 British Champions Sprint on 21 October. It was only the third time she had finished out of the prize money. "She travelled superbly well and when Martin pulled her out everyone thought she had it in her, but she didn't quicken up like she did last year and it was one of the best sprints for many a year." After the race, she was retired, with a plan to sell her as a broodmare. In total, she won eight times and earned more than £650,000 in prize money.

== Assessment and awards ==
On 8 November 2016 Quiet Reflection was named Champion Sprinter at the Cartier Racing Awards. She was the only British-trained award winner for 2016 and the first three-year-old filly to win the award since its inception in 1991. She was also named Yorkshire Horse of the Year.

On her retirement, Burke commented that, "From day one she's been a pleasure to be around, not only for her ability but for her character and temperament, something which I'm sure will be a huge benefit for her next career as a broodmare." Of her career highlights, he said, "While for publicity and pure occasion her win in the Commonwealth Cup at Royal Ascot will long remain in my memory, for me her Haydock Sprint Cup win last year was a special performance and confirmed her as a superb three-year-old sprinter."

Simon Bridge of the syndicate that owned her, said "We could never imagine what she'd do – she's been some flagbearer." Social media response to her had been very supportive. It "shows she's touched a lot of people's hearts."

== Breeding record ==
In February 2019, Quiet Reflection gave birth to a chestnut colt, sired by the great Galileo. The colt and Quiet Reflection are now owned by Coolmore following her sale at the Tattersalls Mares Sale.

The colt named Bluegrass, won at his second race start at the Curragh in August 2021.

== Pedigree ==
Pedigree of Quiet Reflection (GB), bay filly, 2013
| Sire Showcasing (GB) 2007 | Oasis Dream (GB); 2000 | Green Desert | Danzig |
| Sire Showcasing (GB) 2007 | Oasis Dream (GB); 2000 | Green Desert | Foreign Courier |
| Sire Showcasing (GB) 2007 | Oasis Dream (GB); 2000 | Hope | Dancing Brave |
| Sire Showcasing (GB) 2007 | Oasis Dream (GB); 2000 | Hope | Bahamian |
| Sire Showcasing (GB) 2007 | Arabesque (GB); 1997 | Zafonic | Gone West |
| Sire Showcasing (GB) 2007 | Arabesque (GB); 1997 | Zafonic | Zaizafon |
| Sire Showcasing (GB) 2007 | Arabesque (GB); 1997 | Prophecy | Warning |
| Sire Showcasing (GB) 2007 | Arabesque (GB); 1997 | Prophecy | Andaleeb |
| Dam My Delirium (GB) 2008 | Haafhd (GB); 2001 | Alhaarth | Unfuwain |
| Dam My Delirium (GB) 2008 | Haafhd (GB); 2001 | Alhaarth | Irish Valley |
| Dam My Delirium (GB) 2008 | Haafhd (GB); 2001 | Al Bahathri | Blushing Groom |
| Dam My Delirium (GB) 2008 | Haafhd (GB); 2001 | Al Bahathri | Chain Store |
| Dam My Delirium (GB) 2008 | Clare Hills (IRE); 2003 | Orpen | Lure |
| Dam My Delirium (GB) 2008 | Clare Hills (IRE); 2003 | Orpen | Bonita Francita |
| Dam My Delirium (GB) 2008 | Clare Hills (IRE); 2003 | Morale | Bluebird |
| Dam My Delirium (GB) 2008 | Clare Hills (IRE); 2003 | Morale | Shebasis (Family: 20) |
