= Prix Sigy =

- Class: Group 3
- Location: Chantilly Racecourse; Chantilly, France
- Inaugurated: 2004
- Race type: Flat / Thoroughbred
- Website: france-galop.com

Race information
- Distance: 1,200 metres (6f)
- Surface: Turf
- Track: Straight
- Qualification: Three-year-olds excluding Group 1 winners
- Weight: 57 kg Allowances; 1½ kg for fillies Penalties; 3 kg for Group 2 winners 1½ kg for Group 3 winners
- Purse: €80,000 (2022); 1st: €40,000

Prix Sigy
2025
Arizona Blaze	Estepona	Polyvega

Previous years
2024
Sajir	Classic Flower	Symmetric Power
2023
Marshman	Wodao	Vicious Harry
2022
Miramar	Caturra	Le Cadeau
2021
Suesa	Isle Of May	Ideal Beauty

2020-2011
2019
Big Brothers Pride	Happy Odyssey	Kenbaio
2018
Sands Of Mali	Alistair	Absolute City
2017
Fas	Precieuse	Spanish Fly
2016
Quiet Reflection	Jimmy Two Times	Post Var
2015
El Valle	Finsbury Square	Goken
2014
Signs Of Blessing	Farmah	Son Cesio
2013
The Brothers War	Complimentor	Linngaro
2012
Gusto	Carnoustie	Reech Band
2011
Izalia	Captain Chop	Miss Liberty

2010-2004
2010
Mister Manannan	Yosolito	Top Music
2009
Aiboa	Chausson Dore	Doriana
2008
War Officer	Elusif	Inxile
2007
Prior Warning	Law Lord	Place Vendome
2006
Silva	Biniou	Headache
2005
Semarang	Omasheriff	Josh
2004
Dolma	Baqah	Chineur

The Prix Sigy is a Group 3 flat horse race in France open to three-year-old thoroughbreds. It is run over a distance of 1,200 metres (about 6 furlongs) at Chantilly in April.

== History ==
The event is named after Sigy, a successful French-trained sprinter in the late 1970s. It was established in 2004, and initially held Listed status.

The Prix Sigy was promoted to Group 3 level in 2015. The promotion was part of a restructured programme for three-year-old sprinters in Europe.

== Records ==
Leading jockey (2 wins):

- Christophe Lemaire – Dolma (2004), War Officer (2008)
- Christophe Soumillon – Aiboa (2009), The Brothers War (2013)
- Olivier Peslier – Gusto (2012), Suesa (2021)

Leading trainer (3 wins):

- Francois Rohaut - Signs of Blessing (2014), Big Brothers Pride (2019), Suesa (2021)

Leading owner (2 wins):

- Joseph Allen – War Officer (2008), The Brothers War (2013)

== Winners ==
Year	Winner	Jockey	Trainer	Owner	Time
2004	Dolma	Christophe Lemaire	Nicolas Clément	Investment A. B. Tandem	1:13.00
2005	Semarang	Thierry Gillet	Jonathan Pease	Niarchos Family	1:16.10
2006	Silva	Davy Bonilla	Carlos Laffon-Parias	Ghislaine Head	1:09.90
2007	Prior Warning	Dominique Boeuf	David Smaga	Khalid Abdullah	1:09.50
2008	War Officer (Note: The 2008 winner War Officer was later exported to Hong Kong and renamed Rock'n Typhoon)	Christophe Lemaire	Jean-Claude Rouget	Joseph Allen	1:14.10
2009	Aiboa	Christophe Soumillon	Luis Urbano-Grajales	Alvaro Urbano-Roldan	1:14.30
2010	Mister Manannan	Adrian Nicholls	David Nicholls	Maureen Quayle	1:10.10
2011	Izalia	Franck Blondel	Frédéric Rossi	Jean-Claude Seroul	1:10.70
2012	Gusto (Note: The 2012 running was held at Maisons-Laffitte)	Olivier Peslier	Richard Hannon Sr.	Highclere "Rock Sand"	1:12.40
2013	The Brothers War	Christophe Soumillon	Jean-Claude Rouget	Joseph Allen	1:11.05
2014	Signs of Blessing	Stéphane Pasquier	François Rohaut	Ecurie Pandora Racing	1:07.87
2015	El Valle	Mickael Barzalona	Valérie Dissaux	Valérie Dissaux	1:09.56
2016	Quiet Reflection	Dougie Costello	Karl Burke	Ontoawinner / Strecker / Burke	1:13.16
2017	Fas	Maxime Guyon	Pia Brandt	Alain Jathiere & Zalim Bifov	1:08.43
2018	Sands of Mali	Paul Hanagan	Richard Fahey	The Cool Silk Partnership	1:14.49
2019	Big Brothers Pride	Pierre-Charles Boudot	François Rohaut	Kin Hung Kei & Qatar Racing Ltd	1:04.51
	no race 2020 (Note: The 2020 running was cancelled because of the COVID-19 pandemic in France)
2021	Suesa	Olivier Peslier	François Rohaut	George W. Strawbridge Jr.	1:03.68
2022	Miramar	Ronan Thomas	Carlos Lerner	Serge Assous & Patrick Madar	1:02.15
2023	Marshman	Clifford Lee	Karl Burke	Bradley / Burke	1:04.15
2024	Sajir	Mickael Barzalona	André Fabre	Prince A. A. Faisal	1:06.53
2025	Arizona Blaze	David Egan	Adrian Murray	AMO Racing & Giselle de Aguiar	1:01.62
2026	My Calyx Cen	Aurelien Lemaitre	Patrik Olave Valdivielso	Yeguada Centurion Slu	1:03.13

== See also ==
- List of French flat horse races
