= Renaissance Stakes =

Flat horse race in Ireland

- Class: Group 3
- Location: Curragh Racecourse; County Kildare, Ireland
- Race type: Flat / Thoroughbred
- Sponsor: William Hill
- Website: Curragh

Race information
- Distance: 6f (1,207 metres)
- Surface: Turf
- Track: Straight
- Qualification: Three-years-old and up
- Weight: 9 st 3 lb (3yo); 9 st 5 lb (4yo+); Allowances; 3 lb for fillies and mares Penalties; 7 lb for Group 1 winners * 5 lb for Group 2 winners * 5 lb if two Group 3 wins * 3 lb if one Group 3 win * * since 1 January
- Purse: €51,700 (2022); 1st: €32,450

Renaissance Stakes
2026
Soul Love	Big Gossey	Power Blue

Previous years
2025
Art Power	King Cuan	Spycatcher
2024
My Mate Alfie	Big Gossey	Torivega
2023
Go Athletico	Big Gossey	Aesop's Fables
2022
Art Power	Sam Maximus	Just Beautiful
2021
Art Power	Twilight Spinner	Measure Of Magic

2020-2011
2020
Ventura Rebel	Forever In Dreams	Summerghand
2019
Speak In Colours	Downforce	Chessman
2018
Unfortunately	St Patrick's Day	St Brelades Bay
2017
Quiet Reflection	Alphabet	Ardhoomey
2016
The Happy Prince	Flight Risk	La Rioja
2015
Moviesta	Toscanini	Gordon Lord Byron
2014
Jamesie	Gordon Lord Byron	Hamza
2013
Russian Soul	Artistic Jewel	Farmleigh House
2012
Maarek	Starspangledbanner	Fire Lily
2011
Bewitched	Definightly	Croisultan

2010-2001
2010
Bewitched	Croisultan	Snaefell
2009
Snaefell	Girouette	Alexander Youth
2008
Rock Of Rochelle	Rock Moss	Senor Benny
2007
Benbaun	Moss Vale	Prime Defender
2006
Beauty Bright	Noelani	An Tadh
2005
Noelani	Benbaun	Miss Sally
2004
Royal Millennium	Moss Vale	Grand Reward
2003
Fayr Jag	Hanabad	Avonbridge
2002
Polar Way	One Won One	Tender Cove
2001
Invincible Spirit	Toroca	Anna Elise

2000-1991
2000
Social Harmony	Tarry Flynn	Maidaan
1999
Major Force	Major Force	Artistic Blue
1998
Ramooz	Two-Twenty-Two	Mempari
1997
Wizard King	Snow Kid	Deadly Dudley
1996
Wandering Thoughts	Ramooz	Burden Of Proof
1995
Wizard King	Burden Of Proof	Park Charger
1994
Mysterious Ways	Thatching Craft	Ultimo Imperatore
1993
Millie's Choice	Pre-Eminent	Dashing Colours
1992
Norwich	Miznah	Tarwiya
1991
Ballyloop	Misty Valley	Pre-Eminent

1990-1988
1990
Daarik	Blue Sceptre	My Potters
1989
Pirouette	Careafolie	Rain Burst
1988
Lady Eileen	Totem	Head Of The House

The Renaissance Stakes is a Group 3 flat horse race in Ireland open to thoroughbreds aged three years or older. It is run at the Curragh over a distance of 6 furlongs (1,207 metres), and it is scheduled to take place each year in September.

The event was formerly known as the MacDonagh Boland Stakes. It used to be contested over 7 furlongs, and for a period it held Listed status. It was promoted to Group 3 level in 1998, and cut to 6 furlongs in 2001.

The race was called the Ridgewood Pearl Stakes in 2003, in honour of the successful filly Ridgewood Pearl. It was given its present title when a different Ridgewood Pearl Stakes was introduced in 2004. It was switched to an August fixture at the Curragh in 2014 when the Irish Champions Weekend fixture was established, switching places in the calendar with the Flying Five Stakes. In 2016 the race moved to a date in late September.

== Records ==
Most successful horse since 1987 (3 wins):

- Art Power - 2021, 2022, 2025

Leading jockey since 1987 (3 wins):

- Pat Smullen – Major Force (1999), Social Harmony (2000), Benbaun (2007)
- Johnny Murtagh – Polar Way (2002), Bewitched (2010, 2011)
- David Allan - Art Power (2021,2022,2025)

Leading trainer since 1987 (3 wins):

- Tim Easterby - Art Power (2021,2022,2025)

== Winners since 1987 ==
Year	Winner	Age	Jockey	Trainer	Time
1987	King's College	3	Cash Asmussen	Vincent O'Brien	1:19.60
1988	Lady Eileen	3	David Parnell	Kevin Prendergast	1:31.10
1989	Pirouette	3	Stephen Craine	Tommy Stack	1:26.70
1990	Daarik	3	Wayne Harris	Harry Thomson Jones	1:25.80
1991	Ballyloop	3	Christy Roche	Jim Bolger	1:22.80
1992	Norwich	5	Steve Cauthen	Barry Hills	1:29.20
1993	Millie's Choice	4	Willie Supple	Kevin Prendergast	1:36.40
1994	Mysterious Ways	4	Christy Roche	Vincent O'Brien	1:28.60
1995	Wizard King	4	Richard Quinn	Sir Mark Prescott	1:23.10
1996	Wandering Thoughts	7	Niall McCullagh	Pat Flynn	1:26.50
1997	Wizard King	6	Pat Shanahan	Sir Mark Prescott	1:30.10
1998	Ramooz	5	John Reid	Ben Hanbury	1:28.20
1999	Major Force	3	Pat Smullen	Dermot Weld	1:33.40
2000	Social Harmony	6	Pat Smullen	Dermot Weld	1:28.90
2001	Invincible Spirit	4	Pat Eddery	John Dunlop	1:08.10
2002	Polar Way	3	Johnny Murtagh	Amanda Perrett	1:11.70
2003	Fayr Jag	4	Kevin Darley	Tim Easterby	1:12.30
2004	Royal Millennium	6	Ted Durcan	Mick Channon	1:13.10
2005	Noelani	3	Christophe Soumillon	John Oxx	1:11.70
2006	Beauty Bright	3	Seamie Heffernan	Aidan O'Brien	1:14.20
2007	Benbaun	6	Pat Smullen	Mark Wallace	1:09.97
2008	Rock of Rochelle	3	Robert Burke	Andrew Kinsella	1:18.38
2009	Snaefell	5	Fran Berry	Michael Halford	1:15.91
2010	Bewitched	3	Johnny Murtagh	Charles O'Brien	1:14.30
2011	Bewitched	4	Johnny Murtagh	Charles O'Brien	1:13.70
2012	Maarek	5	Jamie Spencer	David Peter Nagle	1:12.33
2013	Russian Soul	5	Shane Foley	Michael Halford	1:11.28
2014	Jamesie	6	Colm O'Donoghue	David Marnane	1:10.20
2015	Moviesta	5	Chris Hayes	Edward Lynam	1:11.64
2016	The Happy Prince	4	Ryan Moore	Aidan O'Brien	1:15.91
2017	Quiet Reflection (Note: The 2017 and 2018 runnings took place at Naas due to redevelopment work at The Curragh)	4	Martin Harley	Karl Burke	1:13.19
2018	Unfortunately	3	Chris Hayes	Karl Burke	1:10.07
2019	Speak In Colours	4	Shane Crosse	Joseph O'Brien	1:15.54
2020	Ventura Rebel	3	Declan McDonogh	Richard Fahey	1:14.09
2021	Art Power	4	David Allan	Tim Easterby	1:11.88
2022	Art Power	5	David Allan	Tim Easterby	1:13.10
2023	Go Athletico	5	Ronan Whelan	Adrian McGuinness	1:17.20
2024	My Mate Alfie	3	Colin Keane	Ger Lyons	1:15.99
2025	Art Power	8	David Allan	Tim Easterby	1:13.78
2026	Soul Love	3	Pierre-Louis Jamin	Karl Burke	1:14.09

== See also ==
- Horse racing in Ireland
- List of Irish flat horse races
