= Harry Angel =

Irish-bred Thoroughbred racehorse

- Racing silks of Mr Peter Ridgers & Godolphin
- Sire: Dark Angel
- Grandsire: Acclamation
- Dam: Beatrix Potter
- Damsire: Cadeaux Genereux
- Sex: Stallion
- Foaled: 8 February 2014
- Country: Ireland
- Colour: Bay
- Breeder: CBS Bloodstock
- Owner: Peter Ridgers; Godolphin
- Trainer: Clive Cox
- Record: 12: 5-4-0
- Earnings: £873,503

Major wins
- Mill Reef Stakes (2016); Sandy Lane Stakes (2017); July Cup (2017); Haydock Sprint Cup (2017); Duke of York Stakes (2018)

Awards
- Cartier Champion Sprinter (2017); World's top-rated sprinter (2017)

Harry Angel (foaled 8 February 2014) is an Irish-bred, British-trained retired Thoroughbred racehorse. He showed very good form as a two-year-old, winning the Group 2 Mill Reef Stakes on his second racecourse appearance. In the following year he emerged as one of the best sprinters in Europe with wins in the Sandy Lane Stakes, July Cup and Haydock Sprint Cup. In 2018 he won the Duke of York Stakes but was injured when he trapped a leg in the starting gate at Royal Ascot.

== Background ==
Harry Angel is a bay horse bred in Ireland by CBS Bloodstock. As a yearling he was consigned to the Goffs sale in August 2015 and was bought for £44,000 by Clive Cox Racing Limited. He entered the ownership of Peter Ridgers and was taken into training by Cox at Lambourn, Berkshire. He has been ridden in all of his races by Adam Kirby.

His sire Dark Angel won four races including the Mill Reef Stakes and the Middle Park Stakes as a two-year-old in 2007 before being retired to stud at the end of the year. Dark Angel's other offspring have included Lethal Force, Mecca's Angel and Persuasive. Harry Angel's dam Beatrix Potter showed very limited racing ability managing two-second places in fifteen starts. She was descended from Avum, a half-sister to Lord Avie.

== Racing career ==
=== 2016: two-year-old season ===
Harry Angel made his racecourse debut in a novice race (for horses with no more than one previous win) over five furlongs at Ascot Racecourse on 7 May. He finished strongly but failed by a nose to overhaul the odds-on favourite Reach High. After an absence of over four months, Harry Angel returned in the Group 2 Mill Reef Stakes over six furlongs at Newbury Racecourse. He was made the 2/1 favourite ahead of six opponents headed by Global Applause (National Stakes) and Legendary Lunch (Woodcote Stakes). After tracking the leaders, he took the lead a furlong out and was "pushed out" by Kirby to win by two and a half lengths from Perfect Angel.

=== 2017: three-year-old season ===
On his first run of 2017 Harry Angel finished second in the Pavilion Stakes at Ascot Racecourse on 3 May, beaten one and a half lengths by the Godolphin colt Blue Point, to whom he was conceding four pounds in weight. At the end of the month he was made 5/6 favourite for the Group 2 Sandy Lane Stakes on firm ground at Haydock Park. He led from the start and pulled clear in the final furlong to win by four and half lengths from the Spring Cup winner Second Thought. After this race he was bought privately by Godolphin but remained in training with Cox. The Group 1 Commonwealth Cup at Royal Ascot in June saw Harry Angel again matched against Blue Point and the colts started second and third in the betting behind the undefeated Irish challenger Caravaggio. Harry Angel led the race from the start and turned back the challenge of Blue Point but was overtaken by Caravaggio in the closing stages and beaten three-quarters of a length into second.

The July Cup at Newmarket Racecourse on 15 July saw Harry Angel compete against older horses for the first time and he started 9/2 third choice in the betting behind Caravaggio and the five-year-old gelding Limato. The other seven runners included The Tin Man (British Champions Sprint Stakes, Diamond Jubilee Stakes), Tasleet (Duke of York Stakes) and Brando (Ayr Gold Cup, Abernant Stakes). Kirby positioned the colt in second behind the pacemaker Intelligence Cross before going to the front approaching the final furlong and Harry Angel kept on well to win by one and a quarter lengths from Limato, with Brando taking third ahead of Caravaggio. After the race Cox said "We came here with a really good feel," Cox said. "The instinctive impression was very good all the way, from the minute he came off the track at Ascot, and I’m so proud that he's delivered in the fashion we thought was possible. He's grown up and become a man. Adam said that just when he wanted to get a blow into him at Ascot, he had to ask him to go. The choke was out all the way. This was one of the nicest July Cups I’ve seen in my lifetime, and I’m very proud to have won it".

On 9 September Harry Angel started 2/1 favourite for the 32Red Sprint Cup on heavy ground at Haydock Park. His opponents included, Tasleet, The Tin Man, Brando (who had won the Prix Maurice de Gheest in August) and Blue Point as well as Magical Memory (Stewards' Cup) and Queen Kindly (Lowther Stakes). Harry Angel made all the running, kicked away from his rivals a furlong out and won in "impressive" style by four lengths from Tasleet. Cox explained that he had been worried by the state of the ground and had only made the final decision to run the colt half an hour before the race. Adam Kirby commented "he's a machine. He's got speed to burn and I knew he’d won as soon as he picked up. He's highly strung and the main thing is to be cool... There's more to come". On his final run of the season the colt started the 5/4 favourite for the British Champions Sprint Stakes at Ascot on 21 October. He took the lead two furlongs out but was overtaken entering the final furlong and finished fourth behind Librisa Breeze, Tasleet and Caravaggio.

=== 2018: four-year-old season ===
On 16 May 2018, Harry Angel, carrying a five-pound weight penalty, was sent off 4/9 favourite in a five-runner field for the Group 2 Duke of York Stakes at York Racecourse. Ridden by Kirby he took the lead in the last quarter mile and won by two lengths from Brando, winner of his previous start in the Group 3 Abernant Stakes. At Royal Ascot in the following month he was made favourite for the Diamond Jubilee Stakes but his run of bad luck at the course continued as he went lame during the race and finished unplaced. He was found to have sustained a deep cut when trapping his leg in the starting stalls.

He returned for the Sprint Cup at Haydock in September and ran well for a long way before tiring into sixth place behind The Tin Man. On 20 October he ran for the second time in the British Champions Sprint Stakes. After being reluctant to enter the stalls he was among the leaders from the start and kept on well to finish second behind the 28/1 outsider Sands of Mali. The horses finishing behind included Brando, The Tin Man, Limato and Librisa Breeze.

== Stud career ==
On 24 October 2018 it was announced that Harry Angel had been retired from racing and would stand as a breeding stallion at Dalham Hall Stud in 2019.

=== Notable progeny ===
c = colt, f = filly, g = gelding

Foaled	Name	Sex	Major Wins
2020	Tom Kitten	g	Spring Champion Stakes, All-Star Mile (twice)
2020	War Machine	g	Stradbroke Handicap
2021	Angel Capital	c	Sir Rupert Clarke Stakes

== Assessment and awards ==
On 16 November 2017 at the Cartier Racing Awards, Harry Angel was named Champion Sprinter.

In the 2017 World's Best Racehorse Rankings, Harry Angel was rated the seventh-best horse in the world and the best sprinter.

== Pedigree ==
Pedigree of Harry Angel (IRE), bay colt, 2014
Sire Dark Angel (IRE) 2005	Acclamation (GB); 1999	Royal Applause	Waajib
Sire Dark Angel (IRE) 2005	Acclamation (GB); 1999	Royal Applause	Flying Melody
Sire Dark Angel (IRE) 2005	Acclamation (GB); 1999	Princess Athena	Ahonoora
Sire Dark Angel (IRE) 2005	Acclamation (GB); 1999	Princess Athena	Shopping Wise
Sire Dark Angel (IRE) 2005	Midnight Angel (GB); 1994	Machiavellian	Mr. Prospector
Sire Dark Angel (IRE) 2005	Midnight Angel (GB); 1994	Machiavellian	Coup de Folie
Sire Dark Angel (IRE) 2005	Midnight Angel (GB); 1994	Night at Sea	Night Shift
Sire Dark Angel (IRE) 2005	Midnight Angel (GB); 1994	Night at Sea	Into Harbour
Dam Beatrix Potter (IRE) 2005	Cadeaux Genereux (GB); 1985	Young Generation	Balidar
Dam Beatrix Potter (IRE) 2005	Cadeaux Genereux (GB); 1985	Young Generation	Brig o'Doon
Dam Beatrix Potter (IRE) 2005	Cadeaux Genereux (GB); 1985	Smarten Up	Sharpen Up
Dam Beatrix Potter (IRE) 2005	Cadeaux Genereux (GB); 1985	Smarten Up	Languissola
Dam Beatrix Potter (IRE) 2005	Great Joy (IRE); 1996	Grand Lodge	Chief's Crown
Dam Beatrix Potter (IRE) 2005	Great Joy (IRE); 1996	Grand Lodge	La Papagena
Dam Beatrix Potter (IRE) 2005	Great Joy (IRE); 1996	Cheese Soup	Spectacular Bid
Dam Beatrix Potter (IRE) 2005	Great Joy (IRE); 1996	Cheese Soup	Avum (Family:1-l)
