= Peter Swann =

British businessman and former football chairman

- Born: 29 October 1963 (age 62)
- Occupation: Businessman
- Known for: Former chairman and owner of Gainsborough Trinity (2008–2013); Former chairman of Scunthorpe United (2013–2022)
- Partner: Karin Swann

Peter Swann (born 29 October 1965) is a British businessman and the former chairman of football clubs Gainsborough Trinity and Scunthorpe United, having taken over at the latter from the retiring Steve Wharton in 2013. Swann's property interests include Scunthorpe United's Glanford Park stadium.

== Football chairman ==
=== Gainsborough Trinity ===
He became chairman of Gainsborough Trinity in October 2008. During his time at the Lincolnshire club, he is believed to have invested £1.5 million.

In 2009, he appointed former Premier League manager Brian Little as the club's new manager, although going on to sack him in August 2011 after a poor run of form.

On 14 November 2011, Swann announced he had agreed a deal in principle to move Trinity to a new stadium on the site of the former Castle Hills secondary school. Swann stated that a move away from The Northolme was necessary to allow the club to grow. On 14 May 2012, he announced that the stadium would be a 4,000 seater stadium and would be a community project, not a football one.

Trinity under new manager Steve Housham advance into the Conference North play-off final after beating FC Halifax Town 3-2 on aggregate, with Swann saying the club had over-achieved. Nuneaton won the final 1-0 to secure promotion to the Conference Premier.

On 28 August 2012, Swann announced he would leave his position as owner of the club for health reasons but had agreed to finance them until the end of the season and would leave them debt free.

Swann later admitted he was walking away from the club in part because the "Blues Club" social club who owned The Northolme would not sell the ground to him, despite stating he didn't want to sell the stadium he only wanted it for the club and the fans.

=== Scunthorpe United ===
He became chairman of Scunthorpe United during the 2013 pre-season, seeing off competition from Sheffield-based boxing promoter Dennis Hobson for the post. He sacked manager Brian Laws following the first-round FA Cup defeat to local rivals Grimsby Town. In 2015, he said of his takeover: "We picked up a club with no systems in place, it was run as a hobby and that is what we have cleared up. There were no records in several departments, no invoices, no purchase ledger, no structure and certainly no leadership at key levels and it has been a huge job to try and achieve."

Swann held an 87.5% stake in the club, as of November 2016.

In December 2013, he spoke of his intent to construct a new stadium for Scunthorpe by 2015. The club were later scheduled to move in to the new ground for the start of the 2016-2017 English football season. After delays and complications over the new stadium's location, the club were unable to proceed with this plan and instead looked to redevelop their current home.

Under his direction, Scunthorpe waived shirt sponsorship money and allowed the charity Prostate Cancer UK to have their name and logo displayed on the front of the team's shirts, to help raise awareness of the disease during the 2015-2016 season. The charity's director of fundraising said he was "incredibly grateful" to Swann and his family for their support in an "exciting project". In 2021, Scunthorpe made Cancer Research UK their main shirt sponsors.

In August 2020 The Scunthorpe Telegraph described Mr Swann as "having earned his justified reputation as a ‘sacker'."

In May 2021, Swann revealed to fans that he had transferred Glanford Park, the training ground, car park and surrounding land to his other business Coolsilk Property and Investment Ltd, in exchange for £11 million worth of loans. On 31 March 2022 with the club 10 points adrift at the bottom of League Two and his position attracting considerable public criticism, Swann announced his resignation as chairman with immediate effect. His family remain majority shareholders, but on 21 July 2022 he indicated that discussions over a sale were at an advanced stage. In September, it was reported that takeover talks had collapsed.

==== Financial crisis ====
On 1 December 2022, the club stated that a deal had been agreed for its sale, following staff wages for November not being paid on time. The deal failed to be finalised and on 11 January 2023, Scunthorpe United were served a winding-up petition by HM Revenue and Customs over an apparent unpaid tax bill, on which Swann declined to comment. On 14 January 2023, United fans invaded the pitch during the second half of their 2–0 National League defeat by Woking, in a protest against Swann (also involved in separate court action regarding gambling debts).

On 25 January 2023, the club announced the immediate takeover of the club by former Ilkeston Town chairman David Hilton. The deal included the stadium and surrounding land, and provided a four-month exclusivity period for Hilton to conclude a £3m agreement to buy the property.

However, Hilton’s legal team raised concerns about the valuation, the stadium's status as a community asset and issues of planning permission and access. Hilton did not buy the stadium within the agreed timeframe; instead he found a loophole solution: a lease agreement that let the club stay at Glanford Park for 7p a week rent - something Swann considered to be trespass and squatting. Hilton claimed that Swann was demanding an unreasonable £1.5 million upfront before starting legal paperwork for the sale. Swann, through a fan message board, claimed Hilton was lying about the whole thing and didn't want to buy the stadium at all. In late May 2023, the gates the Glanford Park were bolted shut and a sign explained the club were legally allowed to 'squat' at Glanford Park.

Swann began legal proceedings to sue both Hilton and the club, with an initial court hearing being adjourned until between January 2024 and March 2024. In September 2023, Hilton stopped funding the club, and the club said that fixtures after 7 October 2023 would be played at Gainsborough Trinity due to the dispute. However, talks about the ground's purchase continued with the club's new owners and on 16 November 2023, the club exchanged contracts with Swann to buy Glanford Park.

== Business ==
Swann is the previous managing director of the former Sands Venue in Gainsborough, Lincolnshire and the State Club nightclub.

He is the owner of Cool Fun Ltd, which operates the Sands live music venue in Blackpool. His wife Karin was joint-chairman of the Wilkinson Hardware Stores chain and is the granddaughter of its founder.

His family fortune was estimated by the Sunday Times at £340 million in 2013.

== Personal life ==
He is married to Karin Swann who was formerly a part owner of Wilko. In May 2012, he had a suspected brain haemorrhage. In October 2013, he said it has not "cleared up totally" but that he was "ninety-five percent".

He is interested in golf and horse racing, owning a number of racehorses including the Group One winner Sands of Mali.
