= The Tin Man (British horse) =

British Thoroughbred racehorse

- Sire: Equiano
- Grandsire: Acclamation
- Dam: Persario
- Damsire: Bishop of Cashel
- Sex: Gelding
- Foaled: 19 February 2012
- Country: United Kingdom
- Colour: Bay
- Breeder: Elizabeth Grundy
- Owner: Fred Archer Racing – Ormonde
- Trainer: James Fanshawe
- Record: 31: 9-4-3
- Earnings: £1,274,888

Major wins
- Leisure Stakes (2016, 2018); Hackwood Stakes (2016); British Champions Sprint Stakes (2016); Diamond Jubilee Stakes (2017); Haydock Sprint Cup (2018)

The Tin Man (foaled 19 February 2012) is a British Thoroughbred racehorse. A specialist sprinter, he did not race as a juvenile but showed promise as a three-year-old in 2015 when he won three minor races. He emerged as a top-class performer in the following year, taking the Leisure Stakes and the Hackwood Stakes before winning the Group 1 British Champions Sprint Stakes. He went on to win the Diamond Jubilee Stakes in 2017 before taking a second Leisure Stakes and the Haydock Sprint Cup in 2018. He failed to win in his last two seasons but did finish second in the 2019 Sprint Cup. The Tin Man retired from racing after sustaining a leg injury in 2021.

== Background ==
The Tin Man is a bay horse with white socks on his hind legs bred in Hertfordshire by Elizabeth and Ken Grundy. Having failed to sell as a foal the yearling colt was put up for auction at Tattersalls in October 2013 and was bought for 80,000 guineas by Anthony Stroud Bloodstock. He entered the ownership of the Fred Archer Racing – Ormonde syndicate and was sent into training with James Fanshawe at Pegasus Stables in Newmarket, Suffolk. After being ridden by Jim Crowley on his debut he was partnered in all of his subsequent races by Tom Queally. The horse was named after the 19th-century jockey Fred Archer, who had built Pegasus Stables and whose nickname was The Tin Man.

He was the most successful racehorse sired by Equiano, a dual winner of the King's Stand Stakes. The Tin Man's dam Persario showed modest racing ability, winning two minor sprint races from nine attempts but did better as a broodmare, producing the top-class sprinter Deacon Blues. She was a female-line descendant of the French mare Nokka, a full-sister to Djebel.

== Racing career ==
=== 2015: three-year-old season ===
The Tin Man was unraced as a juvenile and began his track career in a maiden race over six furlongs at Doncaster Racecourse in May 2015 in which he started at odds of 8/1 and came home sixth of the seven runners. He was gelded shortly after the race. On 27 June, over the same course and distance he recorded his first success as he won by a length at odds of 7/1. The Tin Man followed up by winning a minor handicap race carrying 132 pounds at Doncaster in July and was then off the track for six weeks. He returned for a minor handicap at York in September in which he started favourite but finished eighth of the nineteen runners. On 2 October the gelding contested a slightly more important handicap at Ascot Racecourse and won in "impressive" style, taking the lead a furlong out and coming home four and a half lengths clear of his twelve opponents. For his final run of the year, The Tin Man was stepped up sharply in class for the Group 1 British Champions Sprint Stakes at two weeks later over the same course and distance. Starting at odds of 10/1 he was in contention from the start and finished fourth of the twenty runners behind Muhaarar, Twilight Son and Danzeno.

=== 2016: four-year-old season ===
On 23 May, The Tin Man began his second campaign in the Listed Leisure Stakes over six furlongs at Windsor Racecourse. He was made the 3/1 favourite in a ten-runner field and won "decisively" by two lengths from the six-year-old gelding Watchable. After the race Fanshawe said "It's really good to get that first run under his belt. It's been quite hard to get him right as he had a few little niggles. We have ridden him for his turn of foot and when Tom pushed him he quickened up really well. He has got some big entries and he will get better with age, but we will just box clever with him".

He was strongly fancied for the Diamond Jubilee Stakes at Royal Ascot but ran poorly and finished eighth of the nine runners as Twilight Son who won from the Hong Kong challenger Gold-Fun. In July he started favourite for the Listed Hackwood Stakes at Newbury Racecourse and won by a head from the Mick Channon-trained Divine having been "tenderly ridden" by Queally in the closing stages. At Haydock Park on 3 September the gelding contested the 32Red Sprint Cup and finished second of the fourteen runners, beaten one and three quarter lengths by the three-year-old filly Quiet Reflection.

In the British Champions Sprint Stakes on 15 October The Tin Man started at odds of 13/2 in a thirteen-runner field. Quiet Reflection and Shalaa started 4/1 joint-favourites while the other runners included Twilight Son, Mecca's Angel, Librisa Breeze, Signs of Blessing (Prix Maurice de Gheest), Brando (Ayr Gold Cup) and Donjuan Triumphant (Critérium de Maisons-Laffitte). The field broke into two distinct groups with Signs of Blessing, Don't Touch and The Tin Man racing up the centre of the course while the other runners raced up the stands side (the left-hand side from the jockeys' viewpoint). Signs of Blessing looked like the likely winner entering the final approaching the final furlong but The Tin Man produced a strong late run, gained the advantage 100 yards out and won by a length from the 50/1 outsider Growl. After the race James Fanshawe explained the horse's improved form and previous training problems: "All year it has been stop-start with him, he had a problem in the spring and I’ve not been able to get him ready. We didn’t have the smoothest run going to Ascot, then we had a small problem after that and before his next race we had the coughing".

In the 2016 World's Best Racehorse Rankings The Tin Man was given a rating of 117, making him the 110th-best horse in the world and the third-best sprinter in Europe.

=== 2017: five-year-old season ===
The Tin Man began his third season in the Duke of York Stakes on 17 May in which he finished fifth of the twelve runners behind Tasleet. On 24 June at Royal Ascot, the gelding made his second attempt to win the Diamond Jubilee Stakes and started at odds of 9/2 in a nineteen-runner field. Limato started favourite while the other contenders included Tasleet, Magical Memory (2016 Duke of York Stakes), Librisa Breeze, Growl, Suedois (Prix de Meautry) and The Right Man (Al Quoz Sprint). The Tin Man raced in mid-division as the outsider Kachy set the pace and was then switched to the inside to obtain a clear run approaching the final furlong. The closing stages of the race saw a three-way struggle involving The Tin Man, Tasleet on the outside and Limato racing between horses. On the line, The Tin Man, who hung left in the last 100 yards, prevailed by a neck from Tasleet with Limato three quarters of a length back in third place. James Fanshawe commented "That was a huge relief, as he shows absolutely nothing at home. The biggest clue he gives you is when he ducks out of the way of a leaf on the way home or something like that, and he has been being doing that a bit more regularly recently. He loves Ascot as that is the third time he has won here. It suits his style as he likes to come from off the pace and his acceleration really comes to the fore here". After an inquiry by the racecourse stewards Queally was given a two-day ban for "careless riding" but the result was left unaltered.

In the July Cup at Newmarket Racecourse on 15 July The Tin Man failed to reproduce his best form as he came home eighth of the ten finishers behind Harry Angel. He then ran third to Harry Angel in the Haydock Sprint Cup and before contesting the British Champions Sprint Stakes for the third time on 21 October. On this occasion he started at odds of 9/1 in a twelve-runner field and finished fifth behind Librisa Breeze, Tasleet, Caravaggio and Harry Angel. The Tin Man was scheduled to end his season with a run in the Hong Kong Sprint in December but arrived in Hong Kong with a high temperature, had to be medicated, and was withdrawn from the race.

In the 2017 World's Best Racehorse Rankings The Tin Man was again given a rating of 117, making him the 129th best horse in the world and the sixth best sprinter in Europe.

=== 2018: six-year-old season ===
The Tin Man's first appearance of 2018 was in the Leisure Stakes at Windsor on 21 May for which he started the 7/4 favourite. After being held up at the rear of the field he took the lead a furlong out and repeated his 2016 success as he won by a length from D'bai. In the 2018 edition of the Diamond Jubilee Stakes the gelding started the 5/1 fourth choice in the betting behind Harry Angel, Merchant Navy and Redkirk Warrior. He recovered from being hampered two furlongs out and finished well to take fourth place, just over a length behind the winner Merchant Navy. After running eighteen consecutive races over six furlongs in England, The Tin Man was moved up slightly in trip and sent to France for the Prix Maurice de Gheest over 1300 metres at Deauville Racecourse on 5 August and finished third of the twenty runners behind Polydream and James Garfield.

On 8 September The Tin Man made his third attempt to win the Sprint Cup at Haydock and started the 7/1 third choice alongside Sir Dancealot (Lennox Stakes, Hungerford Stakes) and behind Harry Angel and Tasleet. The other runners included Brando, Donjuan Triumphant, Speak In Colours (Phoenix Sprint Stakes), Eqtidaar and Sands of Mali. Ridden for the first time by Oisin Murphy he settled in mid-division before making progress in the last quarter mile. He took the lead a furlong out and kept on well to win by half a length and a neck from Brando and Gustav Klimt. Murphy, who received a two-day suspension for excessive use of the whip, commented "I'm very lucky to have found so many good horses in a short space of time. This was great. I've been looking forward to riding him all week. The race didn't really go to plan—I didn't travel great early—but he's a very good horse who deserves it. I got the call [to take the ride] at the start of the week, and then I had a few sleepless nights as I really believed the horse could win. You have to enjoy these days because they don't happen all the time".

The Tin Man's fourth run in the British Champions Sprint Stakes saw him start the 3/1 favourite in a fourteen-runner field on 20 October. He started poorly and never looked likely to win, coming home seventh behind the upset winner Sands of Mali.

=== 2019: seven-year-old season ===
As in two of the last three years, The Tin Man began his 2019 campaign in the Leisure Stakes at Windsor but despite starting favourite he was beaten into third place behind Dream of Dreams and Glorious Journey after being boxed against the rails two furlongs out. In June he contested the Diamond Jubilee Stakes for the fourth time and came home sixth of the seventeen runners, four and a half lengths behind the winner Blue Point. A month later he started favourite to repeat his 2016 success in the Hackwood Stakes but never looked likely to win and finished seventh of the ten runners. The Tin Man produced his best performance in September at Haydock when he attempted to win a second Sprint Cup. He stumbled exiting the stalls but recovered well and produced a strong late run to finish second to the three-year-old Hello Youmzain beaten a diminishing half length by his younger opponent. The Tin Man ended his season as usual in the British Champions Sprint Stakes but struggled on the heavy ground and finished unplaced behind the upset winner Donjuan Triumphant.

=== 2020: eight-year-old season ===
The 2020 flat racing season in Britain was disrupted by the COVID-19 pandemic and The Tin Man did not race until June when he made his customary appearance in the Diamond Jubilee Stakes and finished seventh behind Hello Youmzain. In the Hackwood Stakes at Newbury four weeks later he went to the front a furlong out but was caught in the final strides and beaten half a length into second place by the five-year-old Tabdeed. He ran sixth to Dream of Dreams in his fourth appearance in the Haydock Sprint Cup and then finished second to Dakota Gold in the Bengough Stakes at York on 10 October. A week later The Tin Man contested his sixth British Champions Sprint Stakes but made no impact as he came home twelfth of the sixteen runners behind Glen Shiel.

== Retirement ==
The Tin Man remained in training as a nine-year-old and was scheduled to resume his track career in the Cathedral Stakes at Salisbury Racecourse. On the morning of 6 June 2021 the gelding was found to be lame after a training gallop and was taken to the Newmarket Equine Hospital where he underwent an operation on a broken cannon bone. Announcing the horse's retirement from racing Fanshawe said "It's very sad and it's the end of an era really as The Tin Man has been around so long he's part of the family. I see him every day out of our kitchen window as his box is close to the house and he's had the same stable since he arrived here eight years ago. It's a shame he's not going to run again. I know some people will say we should have retired him last year but he was just enjoying everything so much."

In April 2022, The Tin Man joined The National Stud as a living legend, sharing a paddock with Cheltenham Gold Cup winner Lord Windermere.

== Pedigree ==
Pedigree of The Tin Man (GB), bay gelding, 2012
Sire Equiano (FR) 2005	Acclamation (GB); 1999	Royal Applause	Waajib (IRE)
Sire Equiano (FR) 2005	Acclamation (GB); 1999	Royal Applause	Flying Melody (IRE)
Sire Equiano (FR) 2005	Acclamation (GB); 1999	Princess Athena (IRE)	Ahonoora (GB)
Sire Equiano (FR) 2005	Acclamation (GB); 1999	Princess Athena (IRE)	Shopping Wise
Sire Equiano (FR) 2005	Entente Cordiale (IRE); 1998	Ela-Mana-Mou	Pitcairn
Sire Equiano (FR) 2005	Entente Cordiale (IRE); 1998	Ela-Mana-Mou	Rose Bertin (GB)
Sire Equiano (FR) 2005	Entente Cordiale (IRE); 1998	Mirmande (GB)	Kris
Sire Equiano (FR) 2005	Entente Cordiale (IRE); 1998	Mirmande (GB)	Secala (USA)
Dam Persario (GB) 1999	Bishop of Cashel (GB); 1992	Warning	Known Fact (USA)
Dam Persario (GB) 1999	Bishop of Cashel (GB); 1992	Warning	Slightly Dangerous (USA)
Dam Persario (GB) 1999	Bishop of Cashel (GB); 1992	Ballet Clasique (USA)	Sadler's Wells
Dam Persario (GB) 1999	Bishop of Cashel (GB); 1992	Ballet Clasique (USA)	Estaciones
Dam Persario (GB) 1999	Barford Lady (GB); 1985	Stanford (IRE)	Red God (USA)
Dam Persario (GB) 1999	Barford Lady (GB); 1985	Stanford (IRE)	Sweet Almond (GB)
Dam Persario (GB) 1999	Barford Lady (GB); 1985	Grace Poole	Sallust
Dam Persario (GB) 1999	Barford Lady (GB); 1985	Grace Poole	Marvedo (Family:5-j)
