= Perfect Power =

Irish-bred Thoroughbred racehorse

- Racing silks of Rashid Dalmook Al Maktoum
- Sire: Ardad
- Grandsire: Kodiac
- Dam: Sagely
- Damsire: Frozen Power
- Sex: Colt
- Foaled: 15 January 2019
- Country: Ireland
- Colour: Bay
- Breeder: Tally-Ho Stud
- Owner: Rashid Dalmook Al Maktoum
- Trainer: Richard Fahey
- Record: 9: 6-0-1
- Earnings: £714,861

Major wins
- Norfolk Stakes (2021); Prix Morny (2021); Middle Park Stakes (2021); Greenham Stakes (2022); Commonwealth Cup (2022)

Perfect Power (foaled 15 January 2019) is an Irish-bred, British-trained Thoroughbred racehorse. He was one of the best two-year-olds in Europe in 2021 when he won four of his six races including the Norfolk Stakes, Prix Morny and Middle Park Stakes. As a three-year-old he was beaten when tried over one mile in the 2000 Guineas but returned to Group One-winning form when dropped back to six furlongs in the Commonwealth Cup.

== Background ==
Perfect Power is a bay horse with no white markings bred in Ireland by the County Westmeath-based Tally-Ho Stud, a breeding operation run by the O'Callaghan family. In October 2020 the yearling was consigned to the Tattersalls sale but failed to reach his reserve price of 16,000 guineas. In April 2021 the colt was entered in the Goffs Breeze-Up sale, in which two-year-olds are publicly galloped before being auctioned, and was bought for £110,000 by Blandford Bloodstock. He entered the ownership of Rashid Dalmook Al Maktoum, and was sent into training with Richard Fahey at Musley Bank in North Yorkshire.

He was from the first crop of foals sired by Ardad, a precocious sprinter who won the Windsor Castle Stakes and Flying Childers Stakes in 2016. Perfect Power's dam Sagely showed some racing ability, winning two minor races from fifteen starts. Her grand-dam Saga d'Ouilly was a full-sister to both Sagamix and the dam of Sagawara.

== Racing career ==
=== 2021: two-year-old season ===
Perfect Power was ridden in his first four races by Paul Hanagan. The colt made his debut in a novice race (for horses with no more than two previous wins) over five furlongson the synthetic Tapeta at Newcastle Racecourse on 25 May when he started at odds of 5/2 and finished third behind Royal Aclaim and Robasta, beaten a length by the winner. On 9 June the colt started 4/11 favourite for a maiden race on turf at Hamilton Park Racecourse and recorded his first success as he won "easily" by three and a half lengths after taking the lead inside the final furlong. Eight days after his win at Hamilton, Perfect Power was stepped up in class to contest the Group 3 Norfolk Stakes over five furlongs at Royal Ascot and started at odds of 14/1 in a fifteen-runner field. The runners divided in to two groups on either side of the straight course, with Perfect Power among those racing up the near side (the left hand side from the jockeys' viewpoint). He moved into contention entering the final furlong and took the lead in the final strides to prevail in a blanket finish, beating Go Bears Go by a head with Project Dante, Cadamosto, Lucci and Khunan finishing close behind. After the race Fahey commented: "This has been a bit of a bogey race and we've been second at least three times. When they flashed past the post I thought we'd got beat. I was emotional for about two seconds so I must be getting soft in my old age... we haven't had him that long so Roger O'Callaghan [of the Tally-Ho Stud] has to take a bit of credit. We took him up on the grass and he destroyed some of my two-year-olds. We were a little bit unlucky first time but we were quietly confident he'd run a big race."

On 29 July Perfect Power was moved up in class and distance for the Group 2 Richmond Stakes over six furlongs at Goodwood Racecourse and went off at odds of 7/1 in a seven-runner field. After being restrained by Hanagan in the early going the colt was repeatedly denied a clear run as he hung left in the closing stages and came home fifth behind the favourite Asymmetric, Khunan, Gubbass and Ebro River beaten just over a length by the winner. Christophe Soumillon took the ride when Perfect Power was sent to France to contest the Group 1 Prix Morny over 1200 metres at Deauville Racecourse on 22 August and started the 3.8/1 second favourite behind the Molecomb Stakes winner Armor. Asymmetric, Khunan and Gubbass were again in opposition while the other nine contenders included Quick Suzy (Queen Mary Stakes), Velocidad (Airlie Stud Stakes) and Have A Good Day (Prix de Cabourg). He raced towards the rear of the field before producing a strong late run, took the lead 60 metres from the finish and won by one and a half lengths from the Andre Fabre-trained Trident. After the race Fahey said "He's a laid-back character, but I always thought he was pretty smart. I imagine he'd be a nice horse to ride at the races because you wouldn't feel that he was ever going to get flustered... He was very buzzy (when he came to us), but after about two and a half weeks he came back to earth... He soon learned the way we wanted to do it and he's been very simple since."

Soumillon was again in the saddle when Perfect Power ended his campaign in the Group 1 Middle Park Stakes over six furlongs at Newmarket Racecourse on 25 September. He started the 11/4 favourite against eight opponents including Go Bears Go, Asymmetric, Armor, Dr Zempf (second in the Phoenix Stakes), Castle Star (Marble Hill Stakes), Twilight Jet (Cornwallis Stakes) and Caturra (Flying Childers Stakes). After racing towards the rear for most of the way he was switched to the outside and began to make rapid progress in the last quarter mile. In a closely-contested finish he gained the advantage 100 yards from the finish and prevailed by half a length from Castle Star with Armor, Go Bears Go, Caturra and Twilight Jet close behind. Fahey commented "This is a very special day with a very special horse given a very special ride. He's special and you could see that with the way he quickened. He's had a busy season but he loves it. He spends most of his time laying down asleep at home and saves his best for these days... we'll give him every chance to be a 2,000 Guineas horse next year."

== Pedigree ==
Pedigree of Perfect Power (IRE), bay colt, 2019
Sire Ardad (IRE) 2014	Kodiac (GB); 2001	Danehill (USA)	Danzig
Sire Ardad (IRE) 2014	Kodiac (GB); 2001	Danehill (USA)	Razyana
Sire Ardad (IRE) 2014	Kodiac (GB); 2001	Rafha	Kris
Sire Ardad (IRE) 2014	Kodiac (GB); 2001	Rafha	Eljazzi (IRE)
Sire Ardad (IRE) 2014	Good Clodora (IRE); 2009	Red Clubs	Red Ransom (USA)
Sire Ardad (IRE) 2014	Good Clodora (IRE); 2009	Red Clubs	Two Clubs (GB)
Sire Ardad (IRE) 2014	Good Clodora (IRE); 2009	Geht Schnell	Fairy King (USA)
Sire Ardad (IRE) 2014	Good Clodora (IRE); 2009	Geht Schnell	Anita's Princess
Dam Sagely (IRE) 2013	Frozen Power (IRE); 2007	Oasis Dream (GB)	Green Desert (USA)
Dam Sagely (IRE) 2013	Frozen Power (IRE); 2007	Oasis Dream (GB)	Hope (IRE)
Dam Sagely (IRE) 2013	Frozen Power (IRE); 2007	Musical Treat	Royal Academy (USA)
Dam Sagely (IRE) 2013	Frozen Power (IRE); 2007	Musical Treat	Mountain Ash (GB)
Dam Sagely (IRE) 2013	Saga Celebre (FR); 2004	Peintre Celebre (USA)	Nureyev
Dam Sagely (IRE) 2013	Saga Celebre (FR); 2004	Peintre Celebre (USA)	Peinture Bleue
Dam Sagely (IRE) 2013	Saga Celebre (FR); 2004	Saga d'Ouilly	Linamix (FR)
Dam Sagely (IRE) 2013	Saga Celebre (FR); 2004	Saga d'Ouilly	Saganeca (Family: 11-d)
