= Dougie Costello =

Irish jockey (born 1983)

- Costello at Haydock

Personal information
- Born: March 1983 (age 43) Galway
- Occupation: Jockey
- Height: 5 ft 9 in (175 cm)
- Weight: 8 st 11 lb (123 lb; 56 kg) (lowest)
- Website: dougiecostello.wordpress.com

Horse racing career
- Sport: Horse racing

Racing awards
- Top Conditional at Wetherby racecourse & Top Jockey Magic Moment award

Significant horses
- Countrywide Flame; Quiet Reflection

Dougie Costello (born March 1983) is an Irish jockey who is based in Britain. Since 2015, he has ridden mainly on the flat, having previously been a jump jockey. He is one of the few jockeys to have won at the top level in both codes, including the 2012 Triumph Hurdle at the Cheltenham Festival on Countrywide Flame and the 2016 Commonwealth Cup on Quiet Reflection at Royal Ascot.

== Background ==
Unlike many top jockeys, Costello does not have a family background in racing. He grew up as the only child of a single mother on a council estate in Galway and was introduced to riding by an uncle who went hunting. He moved to North Yorkshire to work first in the yard of trainer Mary Reveley and then for trainers Martin Todhunter and John Quinn. His first win on came on York Rite, trained by Richard Guest, in a conditional jockeys' handicap hurdle at Bangor-on-Dee on 1 August 2023.

== Career as a jockey ==
Costello won his first Grade race in November 2006, when he rode Crow Wood to victory in the Grade 2 Elite Hurdle at Wincanton for Quinn. He won the same race the following year on Kings Quay, also trained by Quinn. He achieved his first Grade 1 success when Wayward Prince, trained by Ian Williams, won the Sefton Novices' Hurdle at Aintree in April 2010. Later that year, there was another notable Aintree victory, when Monet's Garden won the Old Roan Chase for trainer Nicky Richards. Countrywide Flame, trained by Quinn, provided Costello with a second Grade 1 success when winning the 2012 Triumph Hurdle at the Cheltenham Festival. The following month he had his first ride in the Grand National, on Postmaster, trained by Tim Vaughn, who was pulled up at the 22nd fence. He also rode in the Grand National in 2013, coming ninth on Saint Are, and in 2015, coming nineteenth on Dolatulo.

Costello made the switch from National Hunt to riding on the flat in 2015. In 2016 he rode as stable jockey to Middleham trainer Karl Burke, whose filly Quiet Reflection provided him with success in the Prix Sigy in April 2016, the Sandy Lane Stakes the following month, the Group 1 Commonwealth Cup at Royal Ascot and the Group 1 Haydock Sprint Cup in September. Burke ended his partnership with Costello in May 2017, saying "things didn't quite pan out as I'd hoped". Since making the switch in codes, Costello still rides occasionally over jumps.

== Personal life ==
Costello married solicitor Aimee Mercer at St Wilfrid's Church, York, in September 2010. The couple have three children. From 2013 to 2017, Costello wrote a racing column for The Irish Post.

== Statistics ==
Flat wins in Great Britain by year

Year	Wins	Runs
2007	0	8
2008	0	4
2009	0	2
2010	0	0
2011	0	1
2013	2	68
2014	5	92
2015	12	223
2016	38	572
2017	67	650
2018	38	556
2019	16	347
2020	26	390
2021	31	402
2022	40	359
2023	32	385
2024	29	308
2025	25	289

Jumps wins in Great Britain by year

Year	Wins	Runs
2007-08	35	408
2008-09	32	400
2009-10	38	308
2010-11	57	366
2011-12	42	377
2012-13	53	471
2013-14	32	431
2014-15	40	442
2015-16	11	93
2016-17	0	6
2016-17	0	6
2016-17	0	6
2016-17	0	6
2017-18	0	1
2019-20	0	4
2020-21	1	11
2021-22	0	2

== Major wins ==
(United Kingdom) Great Britain Flat

- Commonwealth Cup - Quiet Reflection (2016)
- Haydock Sprint Cup - Quiet Reflection (2016)

Jumps

- Sefton Novices' Hurdle - Wayward Prince (2010)
- Triumph Hurdle - Countrywide Flame (2012)
