= Mill Reef Stakes =

Flat horse race in Britain

- Class: Group 2
- Location: Newbury Racecourse; Newbury, England
- Inaugurated: 1972
- Race type: Flat / Thoroughbred
- Sponsor: Dubai Duty Free
- Website: Newbury

Race information
- Distance: 6f (1,207 metres)
- Surface: Turf
- Track: Straight
- Qualification: Two-year-olds
- Weight: 9 st 3 lb Allowances; 3 lb for fillies Penalties; 3 lb for G1 / G2 winners
- Purse: £125,000 (2025); 1st: £73,723

Mill Reef Stakes
2026
Nabati	Jolivette	Arapaho Gold

Previous years
2025
Words Of Truth	Into The Sky	Flying Comet
2024
Powerful Glory	La Bellota	Billboard Star
2023
Array	Mister Sketch	Seven Questions
2022
Sakheer	Rousing Encore	Charyn
2021
Wings Of War	Hierarchy	Fearby

2020-2011
2020
Alkumait	Fivethousandtoone	Rhythm Master
2019
Pierre Lapin	Mystery Power	Shadn
2018
Kessaar	True Mason	Shine So Bright
2017
James Garfield	Invincible Army	Nebo
2016
Harry Angel	Perfect Angel	Global Applause
2015
Ribchester	Log Out Island	Raucous
2014
Toocoolforschool	Growl	Kibaar
2013
Supplicant	Rufford	Hot Streak
2012
Moohaajim	Master Of War	Taayel
2011
Caspar Netscher	Redact	Saigon

2010-2001
2010
Temple Meads	Formosina	Crown Prosecutor
2009
Awzaan	Angel's Pursuit	Quarrel
2008
Lord Shanakill	Gallagher	Sayif
2007
Dark Angel	Strike The Deal	Berbice
2006
Excellent Art	Doctor Brown	Dubai Builder
2005
Cool Creek	Sir Xaar	Nantyglo
2004
Galeota	Mystical Land	Rebuttal
2003
Byron	Grand Reward	Tahreeb
2002
Zafeen	Monsieur Bond	Cassis
2001
Firebreak	Irony	Twilight Blues

2000-1991
2000
Bouncing Bowdler	Pomfret Lad	Bram Stoker
1999
Primo Valentino	Trouble Mountain	Ma Yoram
1998
Golden Silca	Indiana Legend	Belasco
1997
Arkadian Hero	Jimmy Too	Pool Music
1996
Indian Rocket	Proud Native	Seebe
1995
Kahir Almaydan	Kuantan	Warning Time
1994
Princely Hush	Fallow	Gay Gallanta
1993
Polish Laughter	Alanees	First Trump
1992
Forest Wind	Marina Park	Sharp Prod
1991
Showbrook	Jeune	Dilum

1990-1981
1990
Time Gentlemen	Sylvan Breeze	Shalford
1989
Welney	Somethingdifferent	Old Alliance
1988
Russian Bond	Paddy Chalk	Elmayer
1987
Magic of Life	Intimidate	Rahy
1986
Forest Flower	Shady Heights	Rumboogie
1985
Luqman	Stalker	Brave Owen
1984
Local Suitor	Presidium	Bassenthwaite
1983
Vacarme	Fawzi	Water Moccasin
1982
Salieri	Kafu	Krayyan
1981
Hays	Macmillion	Match Master

1980-1972
1980
Sweet Monday	Mattaboy	Poldhu
1979
Lord Seymour	Taufan	Known Fact
1978
King of Spain	Main Reef	Hardgreen
1977
Formidable	Aythorpe	Tumbledownwind
1976
Anax	Adviser	Haighall
1975
Royal Boy	Homeboy	Memory Lane
1974
Red Cross	Green Belt	Captain's Table
1973
Habat	Boldini	Bay Express
1972
Mon Fils	Tudenham	Quill's Prince

The Mill Reef Stakes is a Group 2 flat horse race in Great Britain open to two-year-olds. It is run at Newbury over a distance of 6 furlongs (1,207 metres), and it is scheduled to take place each year in September.

== History ==
The event is named after Mill Reef, a highly successful racehorse in the early 1970s. He was trained at Kingsclere, located several miles from Newbury.

The Mill Reef Stakes replaced a similar race, the Crookham Stakes, in 1972. The winner of the inaugural running, Mon Fils, went on to win the following year's 2,000 Guineas.

The leading horses from the Mill Reef Stakes sometimes race next in the Middle Park Stakes or the Dewhurst Stakes.

== Records ==
Leading jockey (5 wins):

- Pat Eddery – Habat (1973), Red Cross (1974), Formidable (1977), Lord Seymour (1979), Magic of Life (1987)

Leading trainer (4 wins):

- Richard Hannon Sr. – Mon Fils (1972), Showbrook (1991), Galeota (2004), Cool Creek (2005)
- Peter Walwyn – Habat (1973), Red Cross (1974), Formidable (1977), Luqman (1985)

== Winners ==
Year	Winner	Jockey	Trainer	Time
1972	Mon Fils	Ron Hutchinson	Richard Hannon Sr.	1:18.40
1973	Habat	Pat Eddery	Peter Walwyn	1:13.36
1974	Red Cross	Pat Eddery	Peter Walwyn	1:18.88
1975	Royal Boy	Bruce Raymond	Michael Jarvis	1:16.80
1976	Anax	Geoff Lewis	Bruce Hobbs	1:16.40
1977	Formidable	Pat Eddery	Peter Walwyn	1:12.52
1978	King of Spain	Paul Cook	Peter Cundell	1:14.83
1979	Lord Seymour	Pat Eddery	Michael Stoute	1:12.82
1980	Sweet Monday	Philip Waldron	Jack Holt	1:13.16
1981	Hays	Bruce Raymond	Guy Harwood	1:16.51
1982	Salieri	Lester Piggott	Henry Cecil	1:15.12
1983	Vacarme	Lester Piggott	Henry Cecil	1:15.49
1984	Local Suitor	Willie Carson	Dick Hern	1:17.69
1985	Luqman	Nicky Howe	Peter Walwyn	1:14.58
1986	Forest Flower	Tony Ives	Ian Balding	1:14.03
1987	Magic of Life	Pat Eddery	Jeremy Tree	1:16.51
1988	Russian Bond	Willie Ryan	Henry Cecil	1:14.07
1989	Welney	Gary Carter	Geoff Wragg	1:12.11
1990	Time Gentlemen	Willie Carson	John Dunlop	1:15.21
1991	Showbrook	Willie Carson	Richard Hannon Sr.	1:13.95
1992	Forest Wind	Frankie Dettori	Mohammed Moubarak	1:14.80
1993	Polish Laughter	Walter Swinburn	Ben Hanbury	1:15.59
1994	Princely Hush	Micky Fenton	Michael Bell	1:17.23
1995	Kahir Almaydan	Willie Carson	John Dunlop	1:16.28
1996	Indian Rocket	Richard Hills	John Dunlop	1:11.52
1997	Arkadian Hero	Kieren Fallon	Luca Cumani	1:15.05
1998	Golden Silca	Seb Sanders	Mick Channon	1:12.85
1999	Primo Valentino	Michael Roberts	Peter Harris	1:11.52
2000	Bouncing Bowdler	Richard Hills	Mark Johnston	1:13.56
2001	Firebreak	Martin Dwyer	Ian Balding	1:11.79
2002	Zafeen	Steve Drowne	Mick Channon	1:12.91
2003	Byron	Jamie Spencer	David Loder	1:12.68
2004	Galeota	Ryan Moore	Richard Hannon Sr.	1:13.84
2005	Cool Creek	Ryan Moore	Richard Hannon Sr.	1:11.85
2006	Excellent Art	Kerrin McEvoy	Neville Callaghan	1:11.68
2007	Dark Angel	Michael Hills	Barry Hills	1:11.68
2008	Lord Shanakill	Jim Crowley	Karl Burke	1:11.82
2009	Awzaan	Richard Hills	Mark Johnston	1:12.40
2010	Temple Meads	Richard Mullen	Ed McMahon	1:11.73
2011	Caspar Netscher	Kieren Fallon	Alan McCabe	1:13.49
2012	Moohaajim	Adam Kirby	Marco Botti	1:11.19
2013	Supplicant	Tony Hamilton	Richard Fahey	1:13.59
2014	Toocoolforschool	Silvestre de Sousa	Karl Burke	1:14.35
2015	Ribchester	James Doyle	Richard Fahey	1:14.39
2016	Harry Angel	Adam Kirby	Clive Cox	1:13.18
2017	James Garfield	Frankie Dettori	George Scott	1:10.64
2018	Kessaar	Frankie Dettori	John Gosden	1:14.23
2019	Pierre Lapin	Andrea Atzeni	Roger Varian	1:10.90
2020	Alkumait	Jim Crowley	Marcus Tregoning	1:09.70
2021	Wings Of War	Adam Kirby	Clive Cox	1:12.40
2022	Sakheer	David Egan	Roger Varian	1:13.53
2023	Array	Oisin Murphy	Andrew Balding	1:17.29
2024	Powerful Glory	Oisin Orr	Richard Fahey	1:13.89
2025	Words Of Truth	William Buick	Charlie Appleby	1:14.41
2026	Nabati	William Buick	Charlie Appleby	1:10.61

== Crookham Stakes ==
The Crookham Stakes, named after the village of Crookham, was the precursor of the Mill Reef Stakes (although run over a distance of 7 furlongs and 60 yards (1,463 metres)).

- 1960: Colour Blind
- 1961: All a Gogg
- 1962: My Myosotis
- 1963: Soderini
- 1964: Audience
- 1965: Fontex
- 1966: Karpathos
- 1967: Hurry Hurry
- 1968: Full Dress
- 1969: Hazy Idea
- 1970: Revellarie
- 1971: Alonso

== See also ==
- Horse racing in Great Britain
- List of British flat horse races
