= Clifford Lee =

British flat racing jockey

Clifford Lee (born 1996) is a Group 1 winning British flat racing jockey. He is attached to the yard of trainer Karl Burke near Middleham, in North Yorkshire.

Lee was born in 1996, the son of a cleaner and a handyman, and grew up in Kent. He was a competitive boxer as a youth. He was taught to ride by a showjumping uncle and attended a course at the British Racing School in Newmarket. After two years at the yard of Ed Walker in Newmarket, he moved to trainer Karl Burke at Spigot Lodge near Middleham in North Yorkshire.

Lee rode his first Royal Ascot winner in 2021, when Significantly, trained by Burke, won the Palace of Holyroodhouse Stakes. He landed his first Group race win when El Caballo, trained by Burke, won the Group 2 Sandy Lane Stakes in May 2022. Over the next three years he won a further nineteen Group 2 and 3 races for Burke, until achieving his first Group 1 success in August 2025 when Venetian Sun won the Prix Morny at Deauville. That autumn there were successes for the team at Newmarket. At the Cambridgeshire meeting Zeus Olympios won the Group 2 Joel Stakes and Boiling Point won the Cambridgeshire Handicap, which the same team had won the previous year with Liberty Lane. Karmology and Henkelow then secured a Group 3 double at the Dubai Future Champions Festival.

On 26 October 2025, Lee sustained a serious neck injury in an accident on a cross-country motorbike while on holiday in Scotland. He returned to the racecourse after five and a half months, riding a winner on just his second ride. He resumed his successful partnership with Venetian Sun, winning the Group 3 Sandy Lane Stakes and the Group 1 Commonwealth Cup. In November 2026, he rode Royal Champion to victory in the Bahrain International Trophy, being run for the first time as a Group 1 race.

== Major wins ==
(United Kingdom) Great Britain

- Commonwealth Cup - (1) - Venetian Sun (2026)

France

- Prix Morny - (1) - Venetian Sun (2025)

Bahrain

- Bahrain International Trophy - (1) - Royal Champion (2026)
