= British Champions Sprint Stakes =

Flat horse race in Britain

British Champions Sprint Stakes (ex Diadem Stakes)
- Class: Group 1
- Location: Ascot Racecourse; Ascot, England
- Inaugurated: 1946
- Race type: Flat / Thoroughbred
- Sponsor: QIPCO
- Website: Ascot

Race information
- Distance: 6f (1,207 metres)
- Surface: Turf
- Track: Straight
- Qualification: Three-years-old and up
- Weight: 9 st 3 lb (3yo); 9 st 4 lb (4yo+); Allowances; 3 lb for fillies and mares
- Purse: £562,500 (2025); 1st: £318,994

British Champions Sprint Stakes
2026
Almeraq	Paborus	Division

Previous years
2025
Powerful Glory	Lazzat	Quinault
2024
Kind Of Blue	Swingalong	Flora Of Bermuda
2023
Art Power	Kinross	Spycatcher
2022
Kinross	Run To Freedom	Creative Force
2021
Creative Force	Glen Shiel	Minzaal

2020-2011
2020
Glen Shiel	Brando	One Master
2019
Donjuan Triumphant	One Master	Forever In Dreams
2018
Sands Of Mali	Harry Angel	Donjuan Triumphant
2017
Librisa Breeze	Tasleet	Caravaggio
2016
The Tin Man	Growl	Brando
2015
Muhaarar	Twilight Son	Danzeno
2014
Gordon Lord Byron	Tropics	Jack Dexter
2013
Slade Power	Jack Dexter	Viztoria
2012
Maarek	Hawkeyethenoo	Sirius Prospect
2011
Deacon Blues	Wizz Kid	Libranno

2010-2001
2010
Lady Of The Desert	Dalghar	Kingsgate Native
2009
Sayif	Tamagin	Mullein
2008
King's Apostle	Diabolical	Sir Gerry
2007
Haatef	Dark Missile	Assertive
2006
Red Clubs	Baltic King	Fayr Jag
2005
Baron's Pit	Fayr Jag	Avonbridge
2004
Pivotal Point	Airwave	The Tatling
2003
Acclamation	Polar Way	Lochridge
2002
Crystal Castle	Malhub	Acclamation
2001
Nice One Clare	Orientor	Bahamian Pirate

2000-1991
2000
Sampower Star	Tayseer	Trinculo
1999
Bold Edge	Munjiz	Show Me The Money
1998
Bianconi	Russian Revival	Averti
1997
Elnadim	Monaassib	Averti
1996
Diffident	Lucayan Prince	Leap For Joy
1995
Cool Jazz	Young Ern	Branston Abby
1994
Lake Coniston	First Trump	Thousla Rock
1993
Catrail	Marina Park	Zarani Sidi Anna
1992
Wolfhound	Lochsong	Montendre
1991
Shalford	Montendre	Satin Flower

1990-1988
1990
Ron's Victory	Northern Goddess	Tadwin
1989
Chummy's Favourite	Silver Fling	Dancing Dissident
1988
Cadeaux Genereux	Point Of Light	Chummy's Favourite

The British Champions Sprint Stakes is a Group 1 flat horse race in Great Britain open to horses aged three years or older. It is run at Ascot over a distance of 6 furlongs (1,207 metres), and it is scheduled to take place each year in October.

== History ==
The event was established in 1946, and it was originally called the Diadem Stakes. It was named after Diadem (foaled 1914), a winner of several of Ascot's leading races. For a period it was staged in October, and it later moved to September.

The current system of race grading was introduced in 1971, and the Diadem Stakes initially held Group 3 status. It was promoted to Group 2 level in 1996. It had a prize fund of £100,000 in 2010.

The race was given its present name and switched to October in 2011. It became part of the newly created British Champions Day, and its purse was increased to £250,000. It now serves as the sprint-category final of the British Champions Series. The race was upgraded to Group 1 status from its 2015 running.

== Records ==
Most successful horse (2 wins):

- Set Fair – 1952, 1954
- Jack & Jill – 1958, 1959

Leading jockey (7 wins):

- Lester Piggott – Abergwaun (1971), Home Guard (1972), Saritamer (1974), Swingtime (1975, dead-heat), Absalom (1979), Moorestyle (1981), Salieri (1983)

Leading trainer (4 wins):

- Walter Nightingall – Set Fair (1952, 1954), Jack & Jill (1958, 1959)
- Vincent O'Brien – Abergwaun (1971), Home Guard (1972), Saritamer (1974), Swingtime (1975, dead-heat)

== Winners ==
Year	Winner	Age	Jockey	Trainer	Time
1946	The Bug	3	Charlie Smirke	Marcus Marsh	1:17.80
1947	Djelal	3	Charlie Elliott	Charles Semblat	1:20.40
1948	Combined Operations	6	Tommy Burn	Joseph Lawson	1:18.80
1949	Solonaway	3	Gordon Richards	Alfred Smyth	1:17.60
1950	Abadan	3	Gordon Richards	Noel Murless	1:22.80
1951	Ki Ming	3	Scobie Breasley	Michael Beary	1:20.20
1952	Set Fair	3	Eph Smith	Walter Nightingall	1:19.40
1953	Rose Coral	3	Doug Smith	Geoffrey Brooke	1:17.60
1954	Set Fair	5	Scobie Breasley	Walter Nightingall	1:21.20
1955	Pappa Fourway	3	Harry Carr	Bill Dutton	1:21.98
1956 (Note: The 1956, 1960 and 1963 runnings were held at Kempton Park)	King Bruce	5	Scobie Breasley	Peter Hastings-Bass	1:15.00
1957	Arcandy	4	Tommy Gosling	George Beeby	1:17.70
1958	Jack & Jill	3	Stan Clayton	Walter Nightingall	1:22.58
1959	Jack & Jill	4	Harry Carr	Walter Nightingall	1:17.96
1960	Zanzibar	5	Bill Rickaby	John Oxley	1:19.40
1961	Satan	3	Joe Mercer	Tommy Shaw	1:18.21
1962	La Belle	3	Bill Williamson	Harry Wragg	1:17.51
1963	Sammy Davis	3	Doug Smith	Geoffrey Brooke	1:12.60
1964	Ampney Princess	4	Frankie Durr	Harry Hannon	1:18.96
1965	Majority Blue	4	Bill Williamson	John Oxx	1:18.32
1966	Lucasland	4	Eric Eldin	John Waugh	1:20.91
1967	Great Bear	3	Ron Hutchinson	John Dunlop	1:20.26
1968	Secret Ray	4	Sandy Barclay	Doug Smith	1:25.72
1969	Song	3	Joe Mercer	Derrick Candy	1:16.00
1970	Realm	3	Brian Taylor	John Winter	1:15.21
1971	Abergwaun	3	Lester Piggott	Vincent O'Brien	1:14.52
1972	Home Guard	3	Lester Piggott	Vincent O'Brien	1:14.04
1973	Boldboy	3	Joe Mercer	Dick Hern	1:16.62
1974	Saritamer	3	Lester Piggott	Vincent O'Brien	1:20.11
1975 (dh)	Roman Warrior; Swingtime	4; 3	Johnny Seagrave; Lester Piggott	Nigel Angus; Vincent O'Brien	1:15.55
1976	Honeyblest	4	Geoff Baxter	Doug Smith	1:16.01
1977	Gentilhombre	4	Paul Cook	Neil Adam	1:14.14
1978	Creetown	6	Robert Street	Ron Sheather	1:16.33
1979	Absalom	4	Lester Piggott	Ryan Jarvis	1:15.63
1980	Sovereign Rose	3	Willie Carson	Dick Hern	1:13.80
1981	Moorestyle	4	Lester Piggott	Robert Armstrong	1:14.69
1982	Indian King	4	Greville Starkey	Guy Harwood	1:17.00
1983	Salieri	3	Lester Piggott	Henry Cecil	1:14.85
1984	Never So Bold	4	Steve Cauthen	Robert Armstrong	1:13.91
1985	Al Sylah	3	Tony Murray	Harry Thomson Jones	1:13.43
1986	Hallgate	3	Greville Starkey	Sally Hall	1:15.32
1987	Dowsing	3	Pat Eddery	Jeremy Tree	1:14.67
1988	Cadeaux Genereux	3	Pat Eddery	Olivier Douieb	1:15.91
1989	Chummy's Favourite	4	Frankie Dettori	Neville Callaghan	1:14.25
1990	Ron's Victory	3	Freddy Head	Alain Falourd	1:12.66
1991	Shalford	3	Tony Cruz	Richard Hannon Sr.	1:18.95
1992	Wolfhound	3	Steve Cauthen	John Gosden	1:17.20
1993	Catrail	3	Michael Roberts	John Gosden	1:15.63
1994	Lake Coniston	3	Pat Eddery	Geoff Lewis	1:14.35
1995	Cool Jazz	4	Corey Nakatani	Clive Brittain	1:18.56
1996	Diffident	4	Frankie Dettori	Saeed bin Suroor	1:15.36
1997	Elnadim	3	Richard Hills	John Dunlop	1:12.56
1998	Bianconi	3	Johnny Murtagh	Aidan O'Brien	1:13.98
1999	Bold Edge	4	Dane O'Neill	Richard Hannon Sr.	1:20.12
2000	Sampower Star	4	Frankie Dettori	Saeed bin Suroor	1:17.29
2001	Nice One Clare	5	Johnny Murtagh	Pip Payne	1:17.60
2002	Crystal Castle	4	Kieren Fallon	John Hammond	1:13.40
2003	Acclamation	4	Frankie Dettori	Gerald Cottrell	1:12.60
2004	Pivotal Point	4	Seb Sanders	Peter Makin	1:13.55
2005 (Note: The 2005 running was held at Newmarket)	Baron's Pit	5	Johnny Murtagh	Amanda Perrett	1:10.74
2006	Red Clubs	3	Michael Hills	Barry Hills	1:13.71
2007	Haatef	3	Richard Hills	Kevin Prendergast	1:13.96
2008	King's Apostle	4	Liam Jones	William Haggas	1:14.20
2009	Sayif	3	Richard Hills	Peter Chapple-Hyam	1:12.57
2010	Lady of the Desert	3	Richard Hughes	Brian Meehan	1:14.13
2011	Deacon Blues	4	Johnny Murtagh	James Fanshawe	1:12.55
2012	Maarek	5	Jamie Spencer	David Peter Nagle	1:15.99
2013	Slade Power	4	Wayne Lordan	Edward Lynam	1:15.79
2014	Gordon Lord Byron	6	Wayne Lordan	Tom Hogan	1:17.30
2015	Muhaarar	3	Paul Hanagan	Charles Hills	1:13.34
2016	The Tin Man	4	Tom Queally	James Fanshawe	1:12.15
2017	Librisa Breeze	5	Robert Winston	Dean Ivory	1:16.78
2018	Sands of Mali	3	Paul Hanagan	Richard Fahey	1:14.21
2019	Donjuan Triumphant	6	Silvestre De Sousa	Andrew Balding	1:16.43
2020	Glen Shiel	6	Hollie Doyle	Archie Watson	1:16.74
2021	Creative Force	3	William Buick	Charlie Appleby	1:13.79
2022	Kinross	5	Frankie Dettori	Ralph Beckett	1:15.57
2023	Art Power	6	David Allan	Tim Easterby	1:16.92
2024	Kind Of Blue	3	James Doyle	James Fanshawe	1:17.22
2025	Powerful Glory	3	Jamie Spencer	Richard Fahey	1:11.72
2026	Almeraq	4	Tom Marquand	William Haggas	1:12.20

== See also ==
- Horseracing in Great Britain
- List of British flat horse races
- Recurring sporting events established in 1946 – this race is included under its original title, Diadem Stakes.
