= Commonwealth Cup (horse race) =

Flat horse race in Britain

- Class: Group 1
- Location: Ascot Racecourse; Ascot, England
- Inaugurated: 2015
- Race type: Flat / Thoroughbred
- Website: Ascot

Race information
- Distance: 6f (1,207 metres)
- Surface: Turf
- Track: Straight
- Qualification: Three-years-old colts and fillies
- Weight: 9 stone 2 lb Allowances; 3 lb for fillies 10 lb for S. Hemisphere horses
- Purse: £725,750 (2025); 1st: £411,573

Commonwealth Cup
2026
Venetian Sun	Spicy Marg	Division

Previous years
2025
Time For Sandals	Arizona Blaze	Rayevka
2024
Inisherin	Lake Forest	Jasour
2023
Shaquille	Little Big Bear	Swingalong
2022
Perfect Power	Flaming Rib	Flotus
2021
Campanelle	Dragon Symbol	Measure Of Magic

2020-2015
2020
Golden Horde	Kimari	Ventura Rebel
2019
Advertise	Forever In Dreams	Hello Youmzain
2018
Eqtidaar	Sands Of Mali	Emblazoned
2017
Caravaggio	Harry Angel	Blue Point
2016
Quiet Reflection	Kachy	Washington Dc
2015
Muhaarar	Limato	Anthem Alexander

The Commonwealth Cup is a Group 1 flat horse race in Great Britain open to colts and fillies aged three years. It is run at Ascot over a distance of 6 furlongs (1,207 metres), and it is scheduled to take place each year in June.

The Commonwealth Cup was introduced in 2015 as part of changes to the programme of sprint horse races in Europe. The Diamond Jubilee Stakes, run over the same course and distance at the same meeting, was closed to three-year-olds at the same time. The new race was subsequently named the Commonwealth Cup and the Buckingham Palace Stakes was removed from the Royal Ascot meeting to make room for the new race. The race was initially open to all three year-old-horses, including geldings, to help the race become established. It was the only Group 1 flat race in Great Britain exclusively for three-year-olds that allowed geldings to compete and the first age-restricted Group 1 race which was open to geldings in Europe. Geldings were excluded after the 2019 running.

== Records ==
Leading jockey (2 wins):

- Frankie Dettori – Advertise (2019), Campanelle (2021)

Leading trainer (2 wins):

- Karl Burke - Quiet Reflection (2016), Venetian Sun (2026)

== Winners ==
Year	Winner	Jockey	Trainer	Owner	Time
2015	Muhaarar	Dane O'Neill	Charles Hills	Hamdan Al Maktoum	1:12.05
2016	Quiet Reflection	Dougie Costello	Karl Burke	Ontoawinner, Strecker & Burke	1:14.50
2017	Caravaggio	Ryan Moore	Aidan O'Brien	Magnier/ Tabor/ Smith	1:13.49
2018	Eqtidaar	Jim Crowley	Sir Michael Stoute	Hamdan Al Maktoum	1:12.12
2019	Advertise	Frankie Dettori	Martyn Meade	Phoenix Thoroughbred Racing 1	1:11.88
2020	Golden Horde	Adam Kirby	Clive Cox	AlMohamediya Racing	1:14.56
2021	Campanelle (Note: Dragon Symbol finished first in 2021, but he was relegated to second place following a stewards' inquiry)	Frankie Dettori	Wesley A. Ward	Stonestreet Stables LLC	1:16.67
2022	Perfect Power	Christophe Soumillon	Richard Fahey	Rashid Dalmook al Maktoum	1:12.85
2023	Shaquille	Oisin Murphy	Julie Camacho	Hughes, Rawlings, O'Shaughnessy	1:13.15
2024	Inisherin	Tom Eaves	Kevin Ryan	Sheikh Mohammed Obaid Al Maktoum	1:12.51
2025	Time For Sandals	Richard Kingscote	Harry Eustace	Mr D Bevan And Mrs D Bevan	1:12.03
2026	Venetian Sun	Clifford Lee	Karl Burke	Tony Bloom & Ian McAleavy	1:12.08

== See also ==
- Horse racing in Great Britain
- List of British flat horse races
