= Richard Fahey =

Irish racehorse trainer

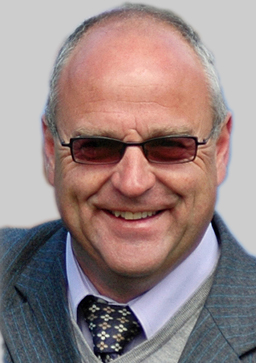

Personal information
- Born: 1966 (age 59–60) Nigeria
- Occupation: Trainer

Horse racing career
- Sport: Horse racing

Major racing wins
- Commonwealth Cup, Middle Park Stakes, Prix Morny, Queen Anne Stakes, The Lockinge Stakes, Prix du Moulin, Superlative Stakes, Mill Reef Stakes, July Cup, Lennox Stakes, Ayr Gold Cup, Prix Jean-Luc Lagardère, Heineken Gold Cup, Canadian Stakes, Yorkshire Cup, Prix Maurice de Gheest, Critérium de Maisons-Laffitte, Jersey Stakes, Prix Jacques Le Marois, Lowther Stakes, Prix De L’Abbeye

Significant horses
- Perfect Power, Ribchester, Queen Kindly, Birchwood, Sands Of Mali, Mr Lupton, Forest Ranger, Don't Touch, Garswood, Sandiva, Supplicant, Glen's Diamond, Ladys First, Mayson, Barefoot Lady, Mickdaam, Wootton Bassett, Knot In Wood, Utmost Respect, Anna Pavlova, Superior Premium, Golden Legacy, Noyan, Fev Rover, The Platinum Queen, The Ridler

Richard Fahey (born 1966) is a racehorse trainer based at Musley Bank yard in Malton in North Yorkshire. As of October 2025, he has saddled thirteen Group 1 winners in Britain and France, and has ten Royal Ascot wins to his name. In 2015 he equalled the record for 235 winners in a year, and reached his 3,000th winner in May 2021.

== Background ==
Fahey was born in Nigeria, where his father was working as an engineer, and grew up in Ireland, where he started riding. He moved to England aged almost eighteen in 1984 to take up a position of conditional jockey at the yard of Jimmy Fitzgerald at Malton in North Yorkshire. He later joined the yard of Peter Easterby and was joint champion conditional jockey in the 1988/89 season. Having ridden over 100 winners, he gave up race-riding and set up a livery yard. He also bought and sold racehorses.

== Career as a trainer ==
Fahey took out a training licence in 1993 and rented premises in Butterwick from his father-in-law, Peter Easterby, before buying Musley Bank yard in Malton in 2005. He sent out his first winner in September 1993, when Ok Bertie won a race at Haydock Racecourse. Although primarily a trainer of horses who run on the flat, his first success at the highest level was in a National Hunt race, when Noyan, ridden by Norman Williamson, won the 1997 Punchestown Gold Cup. Superior Premium, who had been bought for 2,800 guineas, provided Fahey with his first Group race win and first Royal Ascot win, in the 2000 Cork and Orrery Stakes under Johnny Murtagh.

In 2008, Fahey passed a century of winners for the first time. In 2010, two-year-old Wootton Bassett provided Fahey and stable jockey Paul Hanagan with their first Group 1 wins, in the Prix Jean-Luc Lagardère at Longchamp Racecourse in Paris. The yard then went from strength to strength with Group 1 winners Garswood, Mayson and the Godolphin-owned Ribchester.

In 2015, Fahey equalled the record for annual winners set by Richard Hannon Sr. when saddling 235 winners. The record was broken by Mark Johnston in 2019. In May 2021, Fahey saddled his 3,000th winner in Britain, becoming only the eleventh trainer to do so. In 2022 Fahey secured two wins at Royal Ascot, bringing his career total of wins at the meeting to ten. He achieved his thirteenth Group 1 win in October 2025 when Powerful Glory, ridden by Jamie Spencer, won the British Champions Sprint Stakes at odds of 200-1, setting a record for the longest-priced winner of a British Group 1 race.

== Personal life ==
Fahey was married to Leila Easterby, daughter of trainer Peter Easterby. The couple had a daughter and a son before divorcing. His second marriage, to amateur jockey Vicki, produced another daughter. He had two more daughters in a subsequent relationship with Amie Canham, a founding director of Take the Reins, an organisation that aims to promote racing careers to young people.

== Major wins ==
(United Kingdom) Great Britain

- British Champions Sprint Stakes – Sands Of Mali (2018), Powerful Glory (2025)
- Commonwealth Cup – Perfect Power (2022)
- July Cup – Mayson (2012)
- Lockinge Stakes – Ribchester (2017)
- Middle Park Stakes – Perfect Power (2021)
- Queen Anne Stakes – Ribchester (2017)

France

- Prix de l'Abbaye de Longchamp – The Platinum Queen (2022)
- Prix Jacques Le Marois – Ribchester (2016)
- Prix Jean-Luc Lagardère – Wootton Bassett (2010)
- Prix Maurice de Gheest – Garswood (2014)
- Prix Morny – Perfect Power (2021)
- Prix du Moulin – Ribchester (2017)

(Republic of Ireland) Ireland

- Punchestown Gold Cup – Noyan (1997)
