= Karl Burke =

British racehorse trainer (born 1963)

Karl Burke (born May 1963) is a British racehorse trainer based in Middleham in North Yorkshire.

== Background ==
Burke was born in Rugby to Irish parents who were a nurse and a publican. He grew up over pubs in the town and started riding as a child. His interest in racing developed from watching it with his father. Aged 16, he went to trainer Hugh O’Neill's yard in Surrey for a holiday job and stayed on as an apprentice. He then moved to the yard of Alan Jarvis near Coventry and rode a few winners on the flat before switching to jumps on account of his weight. After marrying Jarvis's daughter, Elaine, Burke set up a livery yard near Newark.

== Training career ==
Burke took up a training licence in 1990 and rented stables in Wantage and then Newmarket. He saddled his first Group winner in 1996 when Daring Destiny won the Group 3 Phoenix Sprint Stakes. Daring Destiny also provided Burke with an Ayr Gold Cup win in 1994 and a win in the 1996 Group 2 Goldene Peitsche. In 1998, Always Alight gave Burke his second Ayr Gold Cup win. In 2000, Burke moved to Spigot Lodge yard near Middleham. The move to North Yorkshire cost Burke some of his owners, who preferred to keep their horses in the south of the country, and it was several years before he saddled another group winner, Philario in the 2007 Group 3 Sirenia Stakes. Lord Shanakill provided him with his first Group 1 winner when he took the 2009 Prix Jean Prat in France.

In 2009, the British Horseracing Authority (BHA) banned Burke for a year, after an investigation found that he had passed inside information to gambler Miles Rodgers for reward, and had misled the BHA. He lost an appeal against his disqualification. While Burke was banned from training, his father-in-law, Alan Jarvis, initially took over the yard and then his few remaining horses were sent to a neighbouring yard to be trained by John Weymes with Burke's wife Elaine as assistant trainer. When the ban was up, Elaine was granted a licence to train at Spigot Lodge with Karl as her assistant. Libertarian was a notable success for the team, winning the Group 2 Dante Stakes and finishing second in the Epsom Derby in 2013. By the end of the 2013 season, Burke had regained his full licence.

The yard enjoyed a particularly successful run from 2015 to 2019, with stable stars Odeliz, Unfortunately, Quiet Reflection, Havana Grey and Laurens winning 21 Group races between them. Quiet Reflection, ridden by Dougie Costello in the 2016 Commonwealth Cup provided Burke with his first Ascot Racecourse#Royal_Ascot win and his first domestic Group 1 win. In 2021, Burke achieved a century of winners for the first time. A four-year drought of Group 1 winners was brought to an end when Fallen Angel, owned by Wathnan Racing, won the Moyglare Stud Stakes in September 2023. The following year she provided Burke with a first Irish classic success when winning the Irish 1,000 Guineas. In 2025 she achieved three more Group 1 wins in England and France. In 2024, Burke saw his most successful year in terms of winners and prize money in Britain, with 121 winners and £4,029,418 prize money.

== Personal life ==
Burke is married to Elaine Jarvis, daughter of trainer Alan Jarvis. The couple have two daughters, Kelly and Lucy, who help to run Spigot Lodge yard.

In 2023, Burke underwent surgery and chemotherapy for bowel cancer.

== Major wins ==
(United Kingdom) Great Britain

- British Champions Fillies and Mares Stakes - (1) - Poptronic (2023)
- Commonwealth Cup - (2) - Quiet Reflection (2016), Venetian Sun (2026)
- Fillies' Mile - (1) - Laurens (2017)
- Flying Five Stakes - (1) - Havana Grey (2018)
- Haydock Sprint Cup - (1) - Quiet Reflection (2016)
- Sun Chariot Stakes - (2) - Laurens (2018), Fallen Angel (2025)

France

- Prix de Diane - (1) - Laurens (2018)
- Prix Jean Prat - (1) - Lord Shanakill (2009)
- Prix Jean Romanet - (1) - Odeliz (2015)
- Prix Morny - (2) - Unfortunately (2017), Venetian Sun (2025)
- Prix Rothschild - (2) - Laurens (2019), Fallen Angel (2025)
- Prix Saint-Alary - (1) - Laurens (2018)

(Republic of Ireland) Ireland

- Irish 1,000 Guineas - (1) - Fallen Angel (2024)
- Matron Stakes (Ireland) - (2) - Laurens (2018), Fallen Angel (2025)
- Moyglare Stud Stakes - (1) - Fallen Angel (2023)

Italy

- Premio Lydia Tesio - (1) - Odeliz (2015)
