= Speedy Boarding =

British-bred Thoroughbred racehorse

- Sire: Shamardal
- Grandsire: Giant's Causeway
- Dam: Dash To The Front
- Damsire: Diktat
- Sex: Mare
- Foaled: 10 February 2012
- Country: United Kingdom
- Colour: Bay
- Breeder: Meon Valley Stud
- Owner: Helena Springfield Ltd
- Trainer: James Fanshawe
- Record: 12: 5-2-1
- Earnings: £514,448

Major wins
- Ballymacoll Stud Stakes (2015); Prix Corrida (2016); Prix Jean Romanet (2016); Prix de l'Opéra (2016)

Speedy Boarding (foaled 10 February 2012) is a British Thoroughbred racehorse and broodmare. After finishing third on her only appearance as a juvenile in 2014 she won the Ballymacoll Stud Stakes in the following spring but was beaten in her other five starts and appeared to be a few pounds below the best fillies of her generation. She finally emerged as a top class racemare in 2016 when she recorded three major victories in France, taking the Prix Corrida, Prix Jean Romanet and Prix de l'Opéra. She was retired to become a broodmare at the end of the year.

== Background ==
Speedy Boarding is a dark bay mare with a large white star and a white sock on her left hind leg bred by the Hampshire-based Meon Valley Stud. In October 2013 the yearling filly was put up for auction at Tattersalls but after failing to reach her reserve price of 95,000 guineas and was retained by her breeder. Like all of the stud's home bred horses she raced in the colours of Helena Springfield Ltd, which are black with white spots and a white cap. She was sent into training with James Fanshawe at Pegasus Stables in Newmarket and was ridden in all of her races by Freddy Tylicki.

She was from the sixth crop of foals sired by Shamardal whose wins included the Dewhurst Stakes, Poule d'Essai des Poulains, Prix du Jockey Club and St James's Palace Stakes. His other offspring have included Able Friend, Mukhadram, Lope de Vega and Casamento. Her dam Dash To The Front won the Warwickshire Oaks and came from a female-line family which had been based at Meon Valley for several generations, being a granddaughter of Milligram who was in turn a daughter of One In A Million.

== Racing career ==
=== 2014: two-year-old season ===
Speedy Boarding made her first and only appearance as a juvenile in a maiden race over one mile on good to soft ground at Doncaster Racecourse on 24 October. She started a 20/1 outsider and kept on well in the closing stages to finish third of the thirteen runners behind Star of Seville a filly who went on to win the Prix de Diane.

=== 2015: three-year-old season ===
Speedy Boarding began her second season in a ten furlong maiden at Goodwood Racecourse on 21 May and started the 9/4 favourite against twelve opponents. The closing stages of the race developed into a prolonged struggle between Speedy Boarding and the John Gosden-trained Journey with the former prevailing by half a length and the pair finishing six lengths clear of the rest. On 11 June the filly was stepped up in class for the Listed Ballymacoll Stud Stakes over ten furlongs at Newbury Racecourse and started the 7/2 second favourite behind Encore l'Amour. After racing just behind the leaders, she went to the front a furlong out and won by three quarters of a length from the Irish filly Hot Sauce.

On 18 July Speedy Boarding was stepped up in class and distance to contest the Group 1 Irish Oaks over one and a half miles at the Curragh. Starting at odds of 12/1, she raced in third place for most of the way but appeared to be outpaced in the closing stage and came home fifth behind Covert Love, Jack Naylor, Curvy and Together Forever. After a break of almost two months the filly returned in the John Musker Fillies' Stakes at Yarmouth Racecourse in which she started the 11/4 favourite and finished second, beaten half a length by the four-year-old Talmada. On her final run of the year Speedy Boarding contested the British Champions Fillies & Mares Stakes at Ascot Racecourse on 17 October and started a 25/1 outsider. She was never in serious contention and came home ninth of the twelve runners behind Simple Verse.

=== 2016: four-year-old season ===
On her first appearance as a four-year-old, Speedy Boarding finished fourth behind Beautiful Romance, Koora and Journey in the Group 2 Middleton Stakes over ten and a half furlongs on 12 May at York Racecourse after being repeatedly being blocked in her attempts to obtain a clear run in the straight. Seventeen days after her defeat at York the filly was sent to France for the Group 2 Prix Corrida over 2100 metres at Saint-Cloud Racecourse and started the 4/1 second favourite behind the Prix de Royallieu winner Candarliya. After racing in fourth place, Speedy Boarding went to the front 300 metres from the finish and kept on "gamely" to win by half a length from the six-year-old Siljan's Saga, the winner of the race in 2014.

On 26 June Speedy Boarding ran in the Group 1 Pretty Polly Stakes at the Curragh but made little impact and finished last of the five runners behind Minding. On 21 August at Deauville Racecourse Speedy Boarding contested the Prix Jean Romanet over 2000 metres and started at odds of 6/1 in a field of ten. The Pretty Polly runner-up Bocca Baciata started favourite while the other runners included Sayana (second in the Princess Elizabeth Stakes), Royal Solitaire (Badener Meile), Bateel (Fred Archer Stakes), Steip Amach (Amethyst Stakes) and Carnachy (Daisy Warwick Stakes). Speedy Boarding tracked the leader before taking the advantage 300 metres out and went clear of her opponents to win by one and three quarter lengths from the outsider Ame Bleu. James Fanshawe commented "It's Freddy's first group I winner which is great. He rode her really nicely and got her in a good position. She has always been very talented but as you can see she's a big, tall filly who has taken her time to really come into herself. I think maybe I ran her back a bit quick when she was a little flat in the Pretty Polly in Ireland. On her day she's really good and I thought she won decisively today".

Speedy Boarding returned to France on 2 October for the Group 1 Prix de l'Opéra, which was run that year at Chantilly Racecourse as Longchamp had been closed for redevelopment. She started the 11/2 second choice in the betting behind So Mi Dar, a British-trained three-year-old who was undefeated in four races including the Investec Derby Trial and the Musidora Stakes. The other five runners were Pleascach, Jemayel (Prix Saint-Alary), Royal Solitaire, Sea Front and Pagella. Tylicki settled the filly behind the leaders before making his challenge in the straight and overtook the leader Pleascach 300 metres out. Speedy Boarding repelled the renewed challenge of Pleascach to win by a short head with So Mi Dar half a length away in third. After the race Fanshawe said "It was a brilliant race and there didn't deserve to be a loser. She's so tough and has been a wonderful filly for the yard. She raised her game again after the Romanet and really battled".

On 15 October Speeding Boarding ended her racing career with a second attempt to win the British Champions Fillies & Mares Stakes at Ascot. Starting at odds of 14/1 he stayed on well in the closing stages to finish second to Journey, with Queen's Trust, Seventh Heaven, Zhukova, Bocca Baciata and Bateel finishing behind.

== Breeding record ==
Speedy Boarding was retired from racing to become a broodmare at Meon Valley. Her first foal, a colt sired by Dubawi was born in 2018.

== Pedigree ==
Pedigree of Speedy Boarding (GB), bay mare, 2012
| Sire Shamardal (USA) 2002 | Giant's Causeway (USA); 1997 | Storm Cat | Storm Bird |
| Sire Shamardal (USA) 2002 | Giant's Causeway (USA); 1997 | Storm Cat | Terlingua |
| Sire Shamardal (USA) 2002 | Giant's Causeway (USA); 1997 | Mariah's Storm | Rahy |
| Sire Shamardal (USA) 2002 | Giant's Causeway (USA); 1997 | Mariah's Storm | Immense |
| Sire Shamardal (USA) 2002 | Helsinki (GB); 1993 | Machiavellian (USA) | Mr. Prospector |
| Sire Shamardal (USA) 2002 | Helsinki (GB); 1993 | Machiavellian (USA) | Coup de Folie |
| Sire Shamardal (USA) 2002 | Helsinki (GB); 1993 | Helen Street | Troy |
| Sire Shamardal (USA) 2002 | Helsinki (GB); 1993 | Helen Street | Waterway |
| Dam Dash To The Front (GB) 2003 | Diktat (GB); 1995 | Warning | Known Fact |
| Dam Dash To The Front (GB) 2003 | Diktat (GB); 1995 | Warning | Slightly Dangerous |
| Dam Dash To The Front (GB) 2003 | Diktat (GB); 1995 | Arvola | Sadler's Wells |
| Dam Dash To The Front (GB) 2003 | Diktat (GB); 1995 | Arvola | Park Appeal |
| Dam Dash To The Front (GB) 2003 | Millennium Dash (GB); 1997 | Nashwan (USA) | Blushing Groom |
| Dam Dash To The Front (GB) 2003 | Millennium Dash (GB); 1997 | Nashwan (USA) | Height of Fashion |
| Dam Dash To The Front (GB) 2003 | Millennium Dash (GB); 1997 | Milligram | Mill Reef |
| Dam Dash To The Front (GB) 2003 | Millennium Dash (GB); 1997 | Milligram | One in a Million (Family: 16-h) |
