= Anapurna (horse) =

British Thoroughbred racehorse

- Racing silks of Helena Springfield Ltd
- Sire: Frankel
- Grandsire: Galileo
- Dam: Dash To The Top
- Damsire: Montjeu
- Sex: Filly
- Foaled: 31 March 2016
- Country: United Kingdom
- Colour: Bay
- Breeder: Meon Valley Stud
- Owner: Helena Springfield Ltd
- Trainer: John Gosden
- Record: 7: 4-0-0
- Earnings: £478,596

Major wins
- Lingfield Oaks Trial (2019); Epsom Oaks (2019); Prix de Royallieu (2019)

Anapurna (foaled 31 March 2016) is a British Thoroughbred racehorse, best known for winning the 2019 Epsom Oaks. After finishing unplaced on her only start as a juvenile she won a minor race on her three-year-old debut and went on to win the Lingfield Oaks Trial before winning the Oaks on her fourth start. She took a second Group 1 success later that year when she won the Prix de Royallieu.

== Background ==
Anapurna is a bay filly with a small white star bred by the Hampshire-based Meon Valley Stud. Like most of the Meon Valley Stud's horses she races in the black and white colours of Helena Springfield Ltd. She was sent into training with John Gosden at Newmarket, Suffolk.

She was from the third crop of foals sired by Frankel, an undefeated racehorse whose other progeny have included Cracksman, Soul Stirring and Without Parole. Her dam Dash To The Top was placed in both the Yorkshire Oaks and the Prix Vermeille and came from a female-line family which had been based at Meon Valley for several generations, being a granddaughter of Milligram who was in turn a daughter of One In A Million.

== Racing career ==
=== 2018: two-year-old season ===
Anapurna made her racecourse debut on 27 December when she started at odds of 7/2 in a minor event over 8 1/2 furlongs on the Tapeta surface at Wolverhampton Racecourse. Ridden by David Probert, she started slowly and was never in contention, coming home ninth of the thirteen runners, more than sixteen lengths behind the winner Noble Lineage.

=== 2019: three-year-old season ===
Just over a month after her debut, Anapurna began her three-year-old campaign in a maiden race over ten furlongs on Lingfield Park's Polytrack surface in which she was ridden by Kieran O'Neill. Starting the 6/1 fourth choice in the six-runner field she took the lead approaching the last quarter mile and despite hanging to the right she drew away to win by five lengths from Dawn Crusade. On 11 May Anapurna returned to Lingfield for her first race on turf and started the 7/4 favourite for the Listed Oaks Trial Stakes over 11 1/2 furlongs. Ridden by Frankie Dettori, she tracked the front-running Cape Islay before taking the lead two furlongs out and pulled away from her six opponents to win by six lengths from Tauteke, with King Power 4 1/2 lengths further back in third. After the race John Gosden said "We've planned to come here ever since she won her maiden in January and she did that very nicely. She's not been on grass this year at home, so this was a new experience for her and after running a little green early she finished off her race very well".

The 241st running of the Oaks Stakes over 1 1/2 miles at Epsom Racecourse on 31 May attracted a field of fourteen fillies. Anapurna, ridden by Dettori was the 8/1 fifth choice in the betting behind Mehdaayih (winner of the Cheshire Oaks), Pink Dogwood (Salsabil Stakes) and Maqsad (Pretty Polly Stakes). Dettori settled his mount just behind the leaders and turned into the straight in third place behind the outsiders Lavender's Blue and Peach Tree. Anapurna took the lead on the inside approaching the last quarter mile and after being headed by Pink Dogwood she rallied strongly in the final furlong to regain the advantage and win by a neck. Anapurna's owner and breeder Mark Weinfeld said after the race "I didn't think we were going to get there... We didn't know how good she was and how she would handle the course, but she did it nicely and Frankie gave her a super ride."

After a break of 3 1/2 months, Anapurna returned to the track in the Prix Vermeille over 2400 metres at Longchamp Racecourse on 15 September. Ridden by Oisin Murphy she raced close behind the leaders but failed to make any significant progress in the straight and came home seventh behind her stablemate Star Catcher, beaten just under six lengths by the winner. At the same track on 5 October the filly was partnered by Dettori when she was one of nine fillies and mares to contest the Prix de Royallieu over 2800 metres on very soft ground. The event was being run as a Group 1 race for the first time. Anapurna started the 3.4/1 second favourite behind the Park Hill Stakes winner Enbihaar while the other fancied contenders were Musis Amica (runner-up in the Vermeille), Lah Ti Dar (second in the St Leger) and Mutamakina (second in the Prix Niel). Anapurna led from the start and set a steady pace before staying on well in the straight to win by one and a quarter lengths from the Irish filly Delphinia with Enbihaar a short head away in third place. Dettori said "She was all out at the end, but she's very tough. I used my staying card, made the running, and out-galloped them".

On 19 October Anapurna was made 6/1 third favourite for the British Champions Fillies & Mares Stakes over 1 1/2 miles on heavy ground at Ascot. Her prospects were not helped when she slipped and fell before the start. She raced in second place before fading from contention in the last quarter mile and coming home eleventh of the twelve runners behind Star Catcher. She was retired from racing at the end of the season.

== Pedigree ==
Pedigree of Anapurna (GB), bay filly, 2016
Sire Frankel (GB) 2008	Galileo (IRE); 1998	Sadler's Wells	Northern Dancer
Sire Frankel (GB) 2008	Galileo (IRE); 1998	Sadler's Wells	Fairy Bridge
Sire Frankel (GB) 2008	Galileo (IRE); 1998	Urban Sea	Miswaki
Sire Frankel (GB) 2008	Galileo (IRE); 1998	Urban Sea	Allegretta
Sire Frankel (GB) 2008	Kind (IRE); 2001	Danehill	Danzig
Sire Frankel (GB) 2008	Kind (IRE); 2001	Danehill	Razyana
Sire Frankel (GB) 2008	Kind (IRE); 2001	Rainbow Lake	Rainbow Quest
Sire Frankel (GB) 2008	Kind (IRE); 2001	Rainbow Lake	Rockfest
Dam Dash To The Top (GB) 2002	Montjeu (IRE); 1996	Sadler's Wells	Northern Dancer
Dam Dash To The Top (GB) 2002	Montjeu (IRE); 1996	Sadler's Wells	Fairy Bridge
Dam Dash To The Top (GB) 2002	Montjeu (IRE); 1996	Floripedes	Top Ville
Dam Dash To The Top (GB) 2002	Montjeu (IRE); 1996	Floripedes	Toute Cy
Dam Dash To The Top (GB) 2002	Millennium Dash (GB); 1997	Nashwan	Blushing Groom
Dam Dash To The Top (GB) 2002	Millennium Dash (GB); 1997	Nashwan	Height of Fashion
Dam Dash To The Top (GB) 2002	Millennium Dash (GB); 1997	Milligram	Mill Reef
Dam Dash To The Top (GB) 2002	Millennium Dash (GB); 1997	Milligram	One In A Million (Family: 16-h)

- Anapurna is inbred 3 × 3 to Sadler's Wells, meaning that this stallion appears twice in the third generation of his pedigree.
