= Meon Valley Stud =

- Type: Private
- Industry: Horse racing
- Founded: 1980
- Headquarters: Bishop's Waltham, Hampshire, United Kingdom
- Key people: Egon Weinfeld, founder Mark Weinfeld, owner;
- Website: meonvalleystud.co.uk

Meon Valley Stud is a horse breeding farm, based at Dean Farm, Bishop's Waltham in Hampshire. Founded in 1980 by Egon Weinfeld, it has produced numerous major winners.

== History ==
Dean Farm had been the training base of Bill Wightman, best known for handling the steeplechaser Halloween. After Wightman left the farm after the Second World War the land was used for arable farming before being acquired in 1979 by Egon Weinfeld (1928–2013) who founded the Meon Valley Stud. Weinfeld was an Austrian-born businessman who had come to Britain as an eleven-year-old refugee and had established Helena Springfield Ltd as a successful textile business. John Gosden described him as "an extraordinary breeder and a brilliant man". The stud's homebred horses raced in the colours of Helena Springfield Ltd, which were black with white spots and a white cap. After Weinfeld's death in 2013 the management of the stud was taken over by his son Mark. The stud sells most of its produce at auction but often keeps back the best of its fillies as potential broodmares.

== Foundation mares ==
The stud's four foundation mares were Home And Away, One In A Million, Odeon and Reprocolor who were purchased for Weinfeld by the bloodstock agent Richard Galpin.

One in a Million was bought for 18,500 guineas at Tattersalls Houghton Sale in October 1977. She was an outstanding racehorse who won the Nell Gwyn Stakes, 1000 Guineas and Coronation Stakes in 1979. Her descendants have included Milligram, One So Wonderful, Kissogram (Sun Chariot Stakes), Speedy Boarding, Alnasr Alwasheek (Dante Stakes), Relatively Special (Rockfel Stakes), Sun Boat (San Diego Handicap), Anapurna (Epsom Oaks) and Hoo Ya Mal (second in the Epsom Derby). One in a Million died in 1992 at the age of 16.

Odeon was purchased for 38,000 guineas at the same sale at which One in a Million was acquired. She won the Galtres Stakes and finished second in the Fillies' Mile, Nassau Stakes and Park Hill Stakes. She was the dam of Shirley Superstar who produced the Oaks winner Lady Carla.

Reprocolor was acquired at auction by Weinfeld for 25,000 guineas in December 1977. She won the Pretty Polly Stakes, Lingfield Oaks Trial and the Lancashire Oaks. She became an outstanding broodmare whose descendants have included Colorspin, Bella Colora (Prix de l'Opéra), Izzi Top, Cezanne, Kayf Tara, Opera House, Stagecraft (Prince of Wales's Stakes), Caspar Netscher (Gimcrack Stakes, Mill Reef Stakes, Mehl-Mulhens-Rennen, Nearctic Stakes), Suez (Dick Poole Stakes), Alessandro Volta (Lingfield Derby Trial), Alkaadhem (Jebel Hatta), Necklace, France (Tetrarch Stakes), Torch Rouge (Arlington Handicap), Zee Zee Top (Prix de l'Opéra), Jazzi Top (Prix de la Nonette) and Telecaster (Dante Stakes). Reprocolor died in 2008 at the age of 32.

Home and Away was bought for 60,000 guineas at the 1978 Houghton Sale. She was unraced. She was the female-line ancestor of Noushkey (Lancashire Oaks) and San Sebastian.

== Major winners ==
Meon Valley Stud has produced the following Group 1 winners:

c = colt, f = filly, g = gelding

Foaled	Name	Sex	Group 1 Wins
1983	Colorspin	f	Irish Oaks
1984	Milligram	f	Queen Elizabeth II Stakes
1988	Opera House	c	Coronation Cup, Eclipse Stakes, King George VI and Queen Elizabeth Stakes
1989	Cézanne	g	Irish Champion Stakes
1993	Lady Carla	f	Epsom Oaks
1994	One So Wonderful	f	International Stakes
1994	Kayf Tara	c	2× Ascot Gold Cup, 2× Irish St Leger
1994	San Sebastian	g	Prix du Cadran
1999	Zee Zee Top	f	Prix de l'Opéra
2001	Necklace	f	Moyglare Stud Stakes
2008	Izzi Top	f	Pretty Polly Stakes, Prix Jean Romanet
2012	Speedy Boarding	f	Prix Jean Romanet, Prix de l'Opéra
2016	Anapurna	f	Epsom Oaks, Prix de Royallieu
