= Sleeping Partner =

British-bred Thoroughbred racehorse

- Racing silks of Lord Rosebery
- Sire: Parthia
- Grandsire: Persian Gulf
- Dam: Old Dutch
- Damsire: Fastnet Rock
- Sex: Mare
- Foaled: 1966
- Country: United Kingdom
- Colour: Grey
- Breeder: Lord Rosebery
- Owner: Lord Rosebery
- Trainer: Doug Smith
- Record: 13: 4-3-1

Major wins
- Lingfield Oaks Trial (1969); Epsom Oaks (1969); Ribblesdale Stakes (1969)

Sleeping Partner (foaled 1966) was a British-bred thoroughbred racehorse and broodmare. She showed modest form as a juvenile in 1968 but developed into a top class performer in the following year, winning the Lingfield Oaks Trial, Epsom Oaks and Ribblesdale Stakes. She did not win again and was retired from racing in 1970. She produced no known foals.

== Background ==
Sleeping Partner was a grey mare bred in England by her owner Harry Primrose, 6th Earl of Rosebery. She was sent into training with the veteran Jack Jarvis at his Park Lodge Stable in Newmarket, Suffolk. Unlike many greys Sleeping Partner was very light in colour from a young age and appeared almost white during her track career.

She was sired by Parthia, who won the Epsom Derby in 1959 but was a disappointment as a breeding stallion in Europe before being sold and exported to Japan in 1968. Her dam Old Dutch won two races at Newmarket Racecourse and was a half-sister of the Ebor Handicap winner Donald. She was a great granddaughter of the British broodmare Pearl Maiden (foaled 1918) whose descendants included numerous major winners including Pearl Cap, Pearl Diver, Molvedo, Niniski and Belmez.

== Racing career ==
=== 1968: two-year-old season ===
Sleeping Partner raced seven times as a juvenile but was slow to mature and showed stamina but little speed. She recorded her only success in a maiden race over seven furlongs at Ayr Racecourse in September, but did finish second on at least three occasions. In his last phone call to Lord Rosebery, Jarvis said "Don't be surprised if I win the Oaks for you this time with Sleeping Partner".

When Jack Jarvis died in December 1968, the five-time champion jockey Doug Smith took over the training of the horses at the stable, with the 23-year-old Michael Stoute as his assistant. Stoute later recalled "Some of the staff we inherited were in their 80s. Jack couldn't bring himself to retire them".

=== 1969: three-year-old season ===
Sleeping Partner made her first appearance as a three-year-old in the Oaks Trial at Lingfield Park Racecourse on 17 May and won at odds of 14/1. In the 191st running of the Oaks Stakes over one and a half miles at Epsom Racecourse on 7 June the filly was partnered by the South African-born jockey John Gorton and started at odds of 17/1 in a fifteen-runner field. The leading contenders appeared to be Full Dress and Wenduyne, the winners of the 1000 Guineas and the Irish 1000 Guineas respectively. After being restrained towards the rear in the early stages she produced a sustained run on the outside in the last quarter-mile, overtook the front-running Frontier Goddess inside the final 100 yards and won by three-quarters of a length with Myastrid four lengths back in third place. At Royal Ascot later that month, with Gorton again in the saddle, she was made the 7/4 favourite for the Ribblesdale Stakes and came home five lengths clear of her opponents.

Shortly after her win at Ascot Sleeping Partner contracted a respiratory infection which interrupted her season. She ran twomore races that year without recapturing her best form, finishing third behind Frontier Goddess and Wenduyne in the Yorkshire Oaks in August and fourth to Aggravate in the Park Hill Stakes in September.

=== 1970: four-year-old season ===
Sleeping Partner was unplaced on her only start of 1970 and was retired from racing.

== Breeding record ==
At the end of her racing career Sleeping Partner was retired to become a broodmare at her owner's stud but proved to be barren and produced no known foals.

== Assessment and honours ==
In their book, A Century of Champions, based on the Timeform rating system, John Randall and Tony Morris rated Sleeping Partner an "inferior" winner of the Oaks.

== Pedigree ==
Pedigree of Sleeping Partner (GB), grey mare, 1966
Sire Parthia (GB) 1956	Persian Gulf (GB); 1940	Bahram	Blandford
Sire Parthia (GB) 1956	Persian Gulf (GB); 1940	Bahram	Friar's Daughter
Sire Parthia (GB) 1956	Persian Gulf (GB); 1940	Double Life	Bachelors Double
Sire Parthia (GB) 1956	Persian Gulf (GB); 1940	Double Life	Saint Joan
Sire Parthia (GB) 1956	Lightning (GB); 1950	Hyperion	Gainsborough
Sire Parthia (GB) 1956	Lightning (GB); 1950	Hyperion	Selene
Sire Parthia (GB) 1956	Lightning (GB); 1950	Chenille	King Salmon
Sire Parthia (GB) 1956	Lightning (GB); 1950	Chenille	Sweet Aloe
Dam Old Dutch (FR) 1959	Fastnet Rock (FR); 1947	Ocean Swell	Blue Peter
Dam Old Dutch (FR) 1959	Fastnet Rock (FR); 1947	Ocean Swell	Jiffy
Dam Old Dutch (FR) 1959	Fastnet Rock (FR); 1947	Stone of Fortune	Mahmoud
Dam Old Dutch (FR) 1959	Fastnet Rock (FR); 1947	Stone of Fortune	Rosetta
Dam Old Dutch (FR) 1959	Donah (FR); 1942	Donatello	Blenheim
Dam Old Dutch (FR) 1959	Donah (FR); 1942	Donatello	Delleana
Dam Old Dutch (FR) 1959	Donah (FR); 1942	Silver Fox	Foxhunter
Dam Old Dutch (FR) 1959	Donah (FR); 1942	Silver Fox	Pearl Maiden (Family: 16-b)
