= Milligram (horse) =

British-bred Thoroughbred racehorse

- Sire: Mill Reef
- Grandsire: Never Bend
- Dam: One In A Million
- Damsire: Rarity
- Sex: Mare
- Foaled: 3 April 1984
- Died: 17 July 2017 (Aged 33)
- Country: United Kingdom
- Colour: Chestnut
- Breeder: Meon Valley Stud
- Owner: Helena Springfield Ltd.
- Trainer: Michael Stoute
- Record: 9: 4-3-0

Major wins
- Coronation Stakes (1987); Waterford Crystal Mile (1987); Queen Elizabeth II Stakes (1987)

Awards
- Top-rated British-trained miler (1987); Timeform rating: 122 (1986), 130 (1987)

Milligram (3 April 1984 – 17 July 2017) was a British Thoroughbred racehorse and broodmare, best known for her win over Miesque and Sonic Lady in the 1987 Queen Elizabeth II Stakes. In a racing career which lasted from September 1986 until November 1987 she ran nine times and won four races. Apart from the Queen Elizabeth II Stakes, she won the Coronation Stakes and Waterford Crystal Mile, as well as finishing second in the Prix Marcel Boussac, 1000 Guineas and Irish 1,000 Guineas. She was the highest-rated horse in the United Kingdom over one mile in 1987. Milligram was retired at the end of her three-year-old season and had some success as a broodmare.

== Background ==
Milligram was a "sparely made, workmanlike" chestnut filly with a white star bred by Egon Weinfeld's Meon Valley Stud. She was from one of the last crops of foals sired by Mill Reef, an American-bred horse who won the Epsom Derby, King George VI and Queen Elizabeth Stakes, and Prix de l'Arc de Triomphe in 1971. Mill Reef's other offspring included Reference Point, Shirley Heights, Lashkari and Doyoun. Milligram was the fourth foal of One In A Million, the winner of the 1979 1000 Guineas, whose other foals included Someone Special, the dam of One So Wonderful. As a descendant of the broodmare Mitrailleuse, Milligram came from the same branch of Thoroughbred family 16-h which produced the St Leger winner Commanche Run and the Irish Oaks winner Swiftfoot.

Like the other horses raced by the Meon Valley Stud, Milligram competed in the black and white colours of Helena Springfield Ltd a company owned by Egon Weinfeld. She was trained by Michael Stoute at his Freemason Lodge stables in Newmarket, Suffolk.

== Racing career ==
=== 1986: two-year-old season ===
Milligram made her first appearance in a maiden race over seven furlongs at Newbury Racecourse in September 1986 when she started second favourite in a field of twenty-seven runners. She took the lead inside the final furlong and won by three-quarters of a length from her stable companion Mamouna. She was then moved up abruptly in class when she was sent to France to contest the Group One Prix Marcel Boussac over 1600 metres at Longchamp Racecourse on 5 October. Her opponents included the Prix de la Salamandre winner Miesque and the Prix Morny winner Sakura Reiko. Milligram took the lead in the straight and was caught in the final strides and beaten half a length by Miesque.

=== 1987: three-year-old season ===
Milligram made her first appearance as a three-year-old in the 1000 Guineas over the Rowley Mile course at Newmarket Racecourse on 30 April. Ridden by Walter Swinburn, she started at odds of 13/2 and finished second, beaten one and a half lengths by Miesque. Twenty-three days later, she was matched against the previous year's champion two-year-old filly, Forest Flower, in the Irish 1000 Guineas at the Curragh. Milligram started the even-money favourite but appeared unsuited by the slow early pace and after taking the lead inside the final furlong was caught and beaten a short head by Forest Flower.

At Royal Ascot on 17 June, Milligram ran in the Coronation Stakes, then a Group Two race. and started the 4/5 favourite following the late withdrawal of Forest Flower. She took the lead two furlongs from the finish, accelerated clear of her opponents, and won in "effortless" and "sparkling" style by seven lengths from Shaikiya to record her first win at Group level. The filly was then tried against colts and older horses in the Eclipse Stakes at Sandown Park Racecourse. She appeared not to stay the ten-furlong distance and finished fifth behind Mtoto, Reference Point, Triptych, and Bellotto. Milligram was brought back in distance for the Waterford Crystal Mile at Goodwood Racecourse in August, and started at odds of 5/2 against three opponents. Racing on faster ground than she had previously encountered, she took the lead a furlong from the finish and won by three-quarters of a length from Waajib, with the favourite Star Cutter in third and Risk Me fourth.

26 September 1987 saw the inaugural Festival of British Racing at Ascot, which was intended to showcase the best of British horse racing and featured four major weight-for-age events. The principal race was the Queen Elizabeth II Stakes over one mile, which was promoted for the first time to Group One status and attracted five runners including Milligram, Miesque and the leading miler of 1986 Sonic Lady. With Swinburn opting to ride Sonic Lady, the Irish jockey Pat Eddery was employed to ride Milligram. Miesque, who had won three Group One races since the 1000 Guineas started the 1/4 favourite, with Milligram and Sonic Lady being made the joint second favourite on 6/1. Eddery tracked the pacemaker Verdant Boy before sending Milligram into the lead early in the straight. Miesque emerged as her only challenger but Milligram steadily increased her advantage to win by two and a half lengths. On her final appearance of the season, she was sent to the United States to contest the Breeders' Cup Mile at Hollywood Park. Stoute sent the filly to California a month before the race to allow her to acclimatise to the local conditions. Racing on fast ground, she was poorly supported in the betting and failed to reproduce her best form, finishing unplaced behind Miesque.

== Assessment ==
In 1987, the independent Timeform organisation gave Milligram a rating of 122, five pounds below their top-rated two-year-old filly, Forest Flower. In the official International Classification, she was rated the third best two-year-old filly in Europe behind Forest Flower and Miesque. In the following year's International Classification, she was rated the third best three-year-old filly in Europe behind Miesque and Indian Skimmer and the best horse of any age trained in the United Kingdom over one mile. Timeform gave her a rating of 130, placing her third behind Indian Skimmer (132) and Miesque (131) among the season's three-year-old fillies. When comparing Milligram and Miesque, Timeform stated that "it seems foolish to state dogmatically that one was clearly superior to the other".

In their book, A Century of Champions, based on the Timeform rating system, John Randall and Tony Morris rated Milligram the forty-fifth best British or Irish filly of the 20th century.

== Stud record ==
Milligram was retired from racing to become a broodmare at the Meon Valley Stud. She produced eleven foals between 1989 and 2004:

- Takara Krone, (bay colt, foaled 1989, sired by Alleged)
- Alligram (chestnut filly, foaled 1990, sired by Alysheba), dam of the Sun Chariot Stakes winner Kissogram
- Footlight Fantasy (chestnut filly, foaled 1991, sired by Nureyev) won one race
- Millazure (dark bay or brown filly, foaled 1992, sired by Dayjur)
- Valley Song (filly, foaled 1994, sired by Caerleon)
- Unnamed chestnut colt, foaled 1996 sired by Cadeaux Genereux
- Millennium Dash (chestnut filly, foaled 1997, sired by Nashwan), won one race, dam of Dash to the Top, who was runner-up in the Yorkshire Oaks, and produced Anapurna. She also produced Dash to the Front who won the Warwickshire Oaks and was the dam of Speedy Boarding.
- Second Millennium (chestnut filly, foaled 1999, sired by Nashwan)
- Millafonic (bay colt, foaled 2000, sired by Zafonic), won two races
- Millistar (bay filly, foaled 2003, sired by Galileo), won two races
- Millisecond (bay filly, foaled 2004, sired by Royal Applause), won two races

Milligram was retired from breeding duty in 2006 and lived in retirement at the Meon Valley Stud until her death on 17 July 2017.

== Pedigree ==
Pedigree of Milligram, chestnut mare, 1984
Sire Mill Reef (USA) 1968	Never Bend (USA); 1960	Nasrullah	Nearco
Sire Mill Reef (USA) 1968	Never Bend (USA); 1960	Nasrullah	Mumtaz Begum
Sire Mill Reef (USA) 1968	Never Bend (USA); 1960	Lalun	Djeddah
Sire Mill Reef (USA) 1968	Never Bend (USA); 1960	Lalun	Be Faithful
Sire Mill Reef (USA) 1968	Milan Mill (USA); 1962	Princequillo	Prince Rose
Sire Mill Reef (USA) 1968	Milan Mill (USA); 1962	Princequillo	Cosquilla
Sire Mill Reef (USA) 1968	Milan Mill (USA); 1962	Virginia Water	Count Fleet
Sire Mill Reef (USA) 1968	Milan Mill (USA); 1962	Virginia Water	Red Ray
Dam One In A Million (IRE) 1976	Rarity (GB); 1967	Hethersett	Hugh Lupus
Dam One In A Million (IRE) 1976	Rarity (GB); 1967	Hethersett	Bride Elect
Dam One In A Million (IRE) 1976	Rarity (GB); 1967	Who Can Tell	Worden
Dam One In A Million (IRE) 1976	Rarity (GB); 1967	Who Can Tell	Javotte
Dam One In A Million (IRE) 1976	Singe (IRE); 1972	Tudor Music	Tudor Melody
Dam One In A Million (IRE) 1976	Singe (IRE); 1972	Tudor Music	Fran
Dam One In A Million (IRE) 1976	Singe (IRE); 1972	Trial By Fire	Court Martial
Dam One In A Million (IRE) 1976	Singe (IRE); 1972	Trial By Fire	Mitrailleuse (Family:16-h)
