= San Sebastian (horse) =

British-bred Thoroughbred racehorse

- Sire: Niniski
- Grandsire: Nijinsky
- Dam: Top of the League
- Damsire: High Top
- Sex: Gelding
- Foaled: 21 April 1994
- Country: United Kingdom
- Colour: Chestnut
- Breeder: Meon Valley Stud
- Owner: Ricardo Sanz; Mrs Michael Watt
- Trainer: Michael Grassick; John Dunlop; Marcel Rolland; Kevin Hughes
- Record: 49: 12-7-4
- Earnings: £248,317 (in Europe)

Major wins
- Ascot Stakes (1998); Queen Alexandra Stakes (1999); Prix du Cadran (2000)

San Sebastian (21 April 1994 – 2005) was a British Thoroughbred racehorse who excelled over extended distances. Originally trained in Ireland he showed modest ability in his early career but improved steadily and recorded his first big win as a four-year-old when he took the Ascot Stakes. He returned to Ascot a year later to win the Queen Alexandra Stakes and was transferred to England at the end of the year. As a six-year-old he recorded his most prestigious win when he took the Group 1 Prix du Cadran at Longchamp Racecourse. He failed to win in 2001 and was then moved to France where he won over hurdles in Autumn. He shifted base for a final time when he was exported to New Zealand, where he won three steeplechases. Apart from his twelve victories the gelding was placed in several high-class races including the Prix Royal Oak, Goodwood Cup, Sagaro Stakes, Saval Beg Stakes and New Zealand Grand National. San Sebsatian died in his paddock in New Zealand at the age of 11 in December 2005.

== Background ==
San Sebastian was a chestnut horse bred in England by the Hampshire-based Meon Valley Stud. In September 1995 the yearling colt was put up for auction at Tattersalls and sold to Brian Grassick Bloodstock for 32,000 guineas. He entered the ownership of Ricardo Sanz and was sent into training with Brian Grassick's brother Michael Grassick at the Curragh in Ireland.

He was sired by the American-bred stallion Niniski, who won the Irish St Leger and the Prix Royal-Oak in 1979 before going on to sire many good staying horses including Petoski, Assessor, Minster Son and Hernando. San Sebastian's dam Top of the League showed modest racing ability, winning one minor event from thirteen starts. Top of the League also produced the Lancashire Oaks winner Noushkey as well as Chesa Plana, the dam of Alkaased. As a descendant of the broodmare Mesopotamia, she was also related to Halling, Cherokee Rose, Mukhadram, Mastery, Balla Cove and Alderbrook.

== Racing career ==
=== Early career ===
San Sebastian finished unplaced in all three of his starts as a juvenile in 1996. After his debut in a maiden race at Leopardstown Racecourse in August but the operation brought no immediate improvement as he was well beaten in minor races at the Curragh and Navan in October.

In 1997 San Sebastian was campaigned in handicap races. After finishing ninth at Tipperary he ran fourth at Downpatrick: in the latter race he was equipped with blinkers and wore the headgear in all of his subsequent races. Eddie Ahern, who became the horse's regular jockey over the next two years, took the ride when San Sebastian recorded his first success in a small race over eleven furlongs at Sligo Racecourse on 1 June. San Sebastian won his next three races, taking minor events over thirteen furlongs at Wexford Racecourse in July and August before coming home five lengths of his rivals at Cork on 11 October. On his last run of the year he finished a close second under a weight of 129 pounds in a thirty-runner handicap at Leopardstown.

=== 1998: four-year-old season ===
On his first run as a four-year-old San Sebastian crossed the line in front in a handicap at Cork on 13 April but was relegated to second after the racecourse stewards ruled that he had hampered the runner-up Archive Footage by hanging to the left in the closing stages. At Clonmel Racecourse a month later he completed an unusual and unwelcome double when he finished first but was disqualified for causing interference to the second placed horse Black Queen. At Gowran Park on 30 May he belatedly opened his winning account for the year as he won "easily" by two lengths from Broken Rites when carrying 130 pounds in a fourteen furlong handicap.

On 16 June 1998, San Sebastian was sent to England for the Ascot Stakes over two and a half miles at Royal Ascot. Ridden by Ahern he was assigned a weight of 131 pounds and started at odds of 16/1 against twenty-eight opponents. After being restrained towards the rear of the field he began to make steady progress six furlongs out, overtook the favourite Rainbow Frontier in the straight and drew away to win by four lengths. Ahern commented "I was going so well I had to kick on earlier than I wanted but he really kept going" while Grassick recalled his days as an assistant to his father Christy Grassick saying "I used to look after Godswalk but I missed seeing him win [at Royal Ascot] because somebody had to stay at home and look after the horses. Our worry was the trip but he stayed well today".

After finishing first in eight of his last nine races, San Sebastian was strongly fancied when he returned from a break of over three months to contest the Group 1 Prix du Cadran over 4000 metres at Longchamp Racecourse on 3 October. Racing on soft ground he finished third behind Invermark and Tiraaz, beaten four and a half lengths by the winner. At the end of the month San Sebastian started favourite for the Cesarewitch at Newmarket Racecourse but ran very badly and came home twentieth of the twenty-nine runners. When asked for an explanation for the gelding's poor performance Grassick and Ahern reported that San Sebastian was "feeling the effects of a long season".

=== 1999: five-year-old season ===
In 1999 San Sebastian left handicap competition and was campaigned exclusively in weight-for-age races. He began his campaign by coming home unplaced behind Celeric in the Sagaro Stakes at Ascot in April and then ran third to Enzeli and Risk Material in the Saval Beg Stakes at Leopardstown a month later. On 18 June he returned to Royal Ascot for the Queen Alexandra Stakes over two and three quarter miles in which he was partnered by Mick Kinane and started at 4/1 in a ten-runner field. He tracked the leaders before taking the lead two furlongs out and held off the sustained challenge of Jaseur to win by a neck with five lengths back to the Doncaster Cup winner Canon Can in third place.

San Sebastian ran fifth in the Challenge Stakes at Leopardstown in July and then finished fourth to Royal Rebel in the Ballycullen Stakes at the same track in August. In the Doncaster Cup on 9 September he was ridden for the last time by Ahern and came home fourth of the six runners behind Far Cry, Rainbow High and Celeric. On his final start of the year he ran for the second time in the Prix du Cadran and was beaten a neck into second place by Tajoun.

At the end of October the gelding was offered for sale at Tattersalls for 170,000 guineas by Charlie Gordon-Watson Bloodstock. He henceforth raced in the colours of Mrs Michael Watt and was transferred to England where he was trained by John Dunlop at Arundel, West Sussex.

=== 2000: six-year-old season ===
San Sebastian ran consistently for his new trained in the spring and summer of 2000. He ran fourth to Orchestra Stall in the Sagaro Stakes and sixth to Persian Punch in the Henry II Stakes at Sandown Park before running for the third time at Royal Ascot when he contested the Group 1 Ascot Gold Cup. He came home fourth behind Kayf Tara, Far Cry and Compton Ace after being hampered by the winner a furlong out in an incident which saw his jockey Damien Oliver drop his whip. He went on to finish a close third to Royal Rebel and Far Cry in the Goodwood Cup but ran poorly when coming home sixth of nine behind Enzeli in the Doncaster Cup.

On 1 October at Longchamp the gelding was ridden by Davy Bonilla when he made his third attempt to win the Prix du Cadran and started the 122/1 complete outsider of the nine runners. The Aga Khan's entry of Enzeli and Tajoun was made ods-on favourite while the other runners included Royal Rebel, Persian Punch, Churlish Charm (Yorkshire Cup) and Three Cheers (Prix de Lutèce). Persian Punch set the pace and opened up a clear advantage from Enzeli, with Bonilla settling his mount close behind. San Sebastian began to make progress in the straight, overhauled Persian Punch 100 metres from the finish and won by half a length with Royal Rebel, Churlish Charm, Enzeli and Tajoun just behind. Three weeks later at the same track San Sebastian ended his season by finishing second of the eleven runners behind Amilynx in the Prix Royal-Oak.

=== Later career, retirement and death ===
In 2001 San Sebastian failed to win in eight races, but ran well in some top-class staying events. He ran second in the Sagaro Stakes, third on his attempt to repeat his success in the Cadran and fourth in the Ascot Gold Cup, Lonsdale Stakes and Jockey Club Cup and fifth in the Goodwood Cup. On his two other starts he came home unplaced in the Doncaster Cup and Prix Royal-Oak. At the end of the year the gelding left Dunlop's stable and was sent to France where he was trained by Marcel Rolland.

On his first three starts of 2002 the gelding was unplaced twice in France and then ran for the fifth time at Royal Ascot where he came home fourth in the Queen Alexandra Stakes. After a summer break he returned on 10 September in a hurdles at Auteuil Hippodrome and won by three quarters of a length from the four-year-old Dorado. In October he ran for the fifth time in the Prix du Cadran and came home ninth of the sixteen runners behind Give Notice. On his final European start he reverted to hurdles for the Grand Prix d'Automne at Auteuil and finished last of the eight runners.

San Sebastian was exported to New Zealand where he competed in steeplechases winning at least three races and finishing second in the Grand National Steeplechase at Riccarton Park Racecourse in August 2004. He was retired from racing shortly afterwards and died from a suspected brain haemorrhage in December 2005. On hearing of the horses's death John Dunlop recalled "He made you laugh because he didn't do a tap and it was funny to watch him and our other senior stayer, Orchestra Stall, coming up the gallops like two old gents".

== Pedigree ==
Pedigree of San Sebastian (GB), chestnut gelding, 1994
Sire Niniski (USA) 1976	Nijinsky (CAN); 1967	Northern Dancer	Nearctic
Sire Niniski (USA) 1976	Nijinsky (CAN); 1967	Northern Dancer	Natalma (USA)
Sire Niniski (USA) 1976	Nijinsky (CAN); 1967	Flaming Page	Bull Page (USA)
Sire Niniski (USA) 1976	Nijinsky (CAN); 1967	Flaming Page	Flaring Top (USA)
Sire Niniski (USA) 1976	Virginia Hills (USA); 1971	Tom Rolfe	Ribot (GB)
Sire Niniski (USA) 1976	Virginia Hills (USA); 1971	Tom Rolfe	Pocahontas
Sire Niniski (USA) 1976	Virginia Hills (USA); 1971	Ridin' Easy	Ridan
Sire Niniski (USA) 1976	Virginia Hills (USA); 1971	Ridin' Easy	Easy Eight
Dam Top of the League (IRE) 1982	High Top; 1969	Derring-Do (GB)	Darius
Dam Top of the League (IRE) 1982	High Top; 1969	Derring-Do (GB)	Sipsey Bridge
Dam Top of the League (IRE) 1982	High Top; 1969	Camenae (GB)	Vimy (FR)
Dam Top of the League (IRE) 1982	High Top; 1969	Camenae (GB)	Madrilene
Dam Top of the League (IRE) 1982	Home and Away; 1977	Home Guard (USA)	Forli (ARG)
Dam Top of the League (IRE) 1982	Home and Away; 1977	Home Guard (USA)	Stay At Home
Dam Top of the League (IRE) 1982	Home and Away; 1977	Garden of Eden	Exbury (FR)
Dam Top of the League (IRE) 1982	Home and Away; 1977	Garden of Eden	Mesopotamia (Family: 10-c)
