= Lady Carla =

British-bred Thoroughbred racehorse

- Racing silks of Wafic Saïd
- Sire: Caerleon
- Grandsire: Nijinsky
- Dam: Shirley Superstar
- Damsire: Shirley Heights
- Sex: Mare
- Foaled: 8 March 1993
- Country: United Kingdom
- Colour: Bay
- Breeder: Meon Valley Stud
- Owner: Wafic Saïd
- Trainer: Henry Cecil
- Record: 6: 3-0-0
- Earnings: £225,191

Major wins
- Oaks Trial Stakes (1996); Epsom Oaks (1996)

Honours
- Timeform rating 122

Lady Carla (8 March 1993 – 2012) was a British Thoroughbred racehorse and broodmare best known for winning The Oaks in 1996. In a racing career which lasted from October 1995 to July 1997 the filly ran six times and won three races. After winning her only race as a two-year-old, Lady Carla won the Listed Oaks Trial Stakes at Lingfield Park on her three-year-old debut. Four weeks later she maintained her unbeaten run in the Classic Oaks over 1 1/2 miles at Epsom, winning by nine lengths. She was beaten when favourite for the Irish Oaks and finished unplaced in two races the following season before being retired to stud.

== Background ==
Lady Carla was a bay mare with a white star, bred by the Meon Valley Stud in Hampshire, England. Her sire, Caerleon, won the Prix du Jockey Club and the Benson & Hedges Gold Cup in 1983 and went on to become an "excellent" stallion, siring the winners of more than 700 races including Generous, Cape Verdi, Marienbard and Warrsan. Lady Carla's dam, Shirley Superstar, won one minor race and produced no other important winners, but was a daughter of the Nassau Stakes runner-up Odeon. As a descendant of the French broodmare Democratie, she was related to the Oaks winners Juliette Marny and Scintillate as well as the St Leger winner Julio Mariner, the Nunthorpe Stakes winner Matatina and the Middle Park Stakes winner Showdown.

As a yearling, Lady Carla was sent to the Tattersalls September sales at Newmarket, where she was bought for 220,000 guineas by Wafic Saïd's Addison Racing Ltd. Lady Carla was sent into training with Henry Cecil at his Warren Place stables at Newmarket. She was ridden to all her wins by the veteran Irish jockey Pat Eddery.

== Racing career ==
Lady Carla did not appear on a racecourse in 1995 until late October, when she was sent to contest a £4,000 maiden race at Leicester Racecourse. She started the 5/2 second favourite in a field of twelve runners and won by four lengths from the colt General Macarthur.

Six and a half months after her debut, Lady Carla made her first appearance as a three-year-old in the Oaks Trial Stakes over 11 1/2 furlongs at Lingfield Park. She started 4/11 favourite against three opponents and led from the start to win by 3 1/2 lengths from Flame Valley and Moody's Cat.

The field for the 1996 Epsom Oaks was not a strong one, with the Rockfel Stakes winner Bint Salsabil being the only one of the eleven fillies to have won at Group race level. The best filly of the season, Bosra Sham (also owned by Saïd and trained by Cecil), was rested during the summer after winning the 1000 Guineas. Lady Carla was made 100/30 second favourite behind Pricket, the representative of Sheikh Mohammed's Godolphin organisation. Pricket had been trained by Henry Cecil before until Sheikh Mohammed had withdrawn all his horses from the Warren Place stable the previous autumn. Pat Eddery positioned Lady Carla among the leaders from the start and turned into the straight in second place behind Moody's Cat. Two furlongs from the finish, Lady Carla took the lead and accelerated clear of the field, winning by nine lengths from Pricket, with Mezzogiorno half a length back in third. The winning distance was the fourth longest of the century, after those of Sun Princess (twelve lengths in 1983), Noblesse (ten lengths in 1963) and Jet Ski Lady (ten lengths in 1991). Only five fillies appeared to oppose Lady Carla in the Irish Oaks at the Curragh in July, and she started at odds of 1/2 to maintain her unbeaten record. The build-up to the race was marked by controversy, with Cecil angrily denying claims from the television pundit John McCririck that the filly had developed a serious respiratory condition. In the race, Eddery attempted to lead from the start, but when Lady Carla was challenged in the straight she failed to respond and was soon beaten. She finished fourth behind the Dermot Weld-trained Dance Design, beaten by 4 1/2 lengths.

Lady Carla returned as a four-year-old in 1997, and made her first appearance for eleven months in the Hardwicke Stakes at Royal Ascot. Ridden by Cecil's new stable jockey Kieren Fallon, she was among the leaders until half way, but then weakened to finish ninth of the ten runners behind Predappio. In July, Lady Carla was ridden by Willie Ryan in the Princess of Wales's Stakes at Newmarket, Fallon having lost the mount after a questionable ride on Bosra Sham in the Eclipse Stakes. She was struggling half a mile from the finish and came home last of the seven runners in a race won by Shantou.

== Assessment and honours ==
The independent Timeform organisation gave Lady Carla a rating of 122.

In their book A Century of Champions, based on the Timeform rating system, John Randall and Tony Morris rated Lady Carla an "inferior" winner of the Oaks.

== Stud record ==
Lady Carla was retired to become a broodmare based at the Kiltinan Stud in County Tipperary. In December 2003 at Tattersalls, the ten-year-old Lady Carla was auctioned at a dispersal of Wafic Saïd's bloodstock, after the Syrian businessman decided to give up his interest in horse racing. She was bought for 1,050,000 guineas by the Irish breeder Timmy Hyde.

Lady Carla's offspring have not been particularly successful. Her best runners have probably been Avalon, who won a minor race and finished third in the Great Voltigeur Stakes, and High Ruler, who finished fourth in the Irish 2,000 Guineas. Another of her sons, Indigo Magic, has become a successful breeding stallion in South Africa. Lady Carla died in 2012.

1999 Indigo Magic (GB) : Bay colt, foaled 26 January, by Gone West (USA) – placed once from 2 starts in Ireland 2002

2002 Avalon (GB) : Bay colt (gelded), foaled 7 March, by Kingmambo (USA) : won 1 race on the flat and placed twice including 3rd G2 Great Voltigeur S, York; 3rd LR Aston Park S, Newbury in Ireland and England 2005–6; placed 4 times from 7 starts over hurdles in England 2006-7

2005 Prairie Hawk (USA) : Bay colt (gelded), foaled 26 February, by Hawk Wing (USA) – won 3 races from 13 starts on the flat in Ireland and England 2007–12 and unplaced 5 starts over hurdles in England 2012–15

2008 High Ruler (USA) : Bay colt, foaled 30 March, by Mr Greeley (USA) – won 1 race and placed four times including 2nd G3 Tyros S, Leopardstown; 2nd G3 Diamond S, Dundalk; 4th G1 Irish 2000 Guineas, Curragh; 4th G2 Futurity S, Curragh from 9 starts in Ireland and Qatar 2010–13

== Pedigree ==
Pedigree of Lady Carla (GB), bay mare, 1993
Sire Caerleon (USA) 1980	Nijinsky; 1967	Northern Dancer	Nearctic
Sire Caerleon (USA) 1980	Nijinsky; 1967	Northern Dancer	Natalma
Sire Caerleon (USA) 1980	Nijinsky; 1967	Flaming Page	Bull Page
Sire Caerleon (USA) 1980	Nijinsky; 1967	Flaming Page	Flaring Top
Sire Caerleon (USA) 1980	Foreseer; 1969	Round Table	Princequillo
Sire Caerleon (USA) 1980	Foreseer; 1969	Round Table	Knight's Daughter
Sire Caerleon (USA) 1980	Foreseer; 1969	Regal Gleam	Hail To Reason
Sire Caerleon (USA) 1980	Foreseer; 1969	Regal Gleam	Miz Carol
Dam Shirley Superstar (GB) 1985	Shirley Heights; 1975	Mill Reef	Never Bend
Dam Shirley Superstar (GB) 1985	Shirley Heights; 1975	Mill Reef	Milan Mill
Dam Shirley Superstar (GB) 1985	Shirley Heights; 1975	Hardiemma	Hardicanute
Dam Shirley Superstar (GB) 1985	Shirley Heights; 1975	Hardiemma	Grand Cross
Dam Shirley Superstar (GB) 1985	Odeon; 1976	Royal and Regal	Vaguely Noble
Dam Shirley Superstar (GB) 1985	Odeon; 1976	Royal and Regal	Native Street
Dam Shirley Superstar (GB) 1985	Odeon; 1976	Cammina	Hornbeam
Dam Shirley Superstar (GB) 1985	Odeon; 1976	Cammina	Zanzara (Family: 6-b)
