= Marcia Anastasia Christoforides =

British philanthropist, art collector and racehorse owner

The Right Honourable The Lady Beaverbrook

Chancellor of Dalhousie University
- In office 1967–1990
- Preceded by: C. D. Howe
- Succeeded by: H. Reuben Cohen

Personal details
- Born: Marcia Anastasia Christoforides; 27 July 1909 Sutton, Surrey, England
- Died: 28 October 1994 (aged 85) New Brunswick, Canada
- Spouses: James Hamet Dunn, 1st Baronet (m. 1942; died 1956) Max Aitken, 1st Baron Beaverbrook (m. 1963; died 1964)

Marcia Anastasia "Christofor" Aitken, Baroness Beaverbrook (née Christoforides, formerly Lady Dunn; 27 July 1909 – 28 October 1994) was a Canadian and British Cypriot philanthropist, art collector, and racehorse owner.

== Early life and family ==
Beaverbrook was born Marcia Anastasia Christoforides on 27 July 1909 in Sutton, Surrey (present-day London) to John Christoforides (Note: Also cited as Christoforidi.), a Greek Cypriot tobacco merchant, and Mildred Christoforides (née Boyes). (Note: Also cited as Nightingale-Boyes.) The youngest of three sisters, Christoforides was educated at Roedean School.

In 1930, Christoforides began working as a secretary for her future husband James Hamet Dunn, 1st Baronet, a Canadian financier based in London. Dunn returned to Canada in 1935, where he had gained control of the bankrupt Algoma Steel Corporation in Sault Ste. Marie, Ontario. Christoforides joined him in Sault Ste. Marie and became his assistant secretary. Dunn later divorced his wife, and after Christoforides had nursed him through a near fatal illness, the couple married on 7 June 1942. She had been a devoted employee and he would seek her input on most every business matter for the rest of his life. The couple maintained homes in England, France, and at the seaside resort of St. Andrews in New Brunswick, Canada, the province of her husband's birth. In the late 1940s, Lady Dunn and her husband developed a friendship with the Spanish artist Salvador Dalí who painted several portraits of them, notably Equestrian Fantasy - Portrait of Lady Dunn. These works are now on permanent display at the Beaverbrook Art Gallery in Fredericton, New Brunswick.

Following his death, on 1 January 1956, she inherited half his fortune (estimated at nearly C$70 million). Known as Christofor to her family and friends, on the death of her husband in 1956 she became the beneficiary of a large estate and also the administrator of a fund to be used for charitable purposes. One of her late husband's closest friends was his fellow New Brunswicker, Max Aitken, 1st Baron Beaverbrook who acted as her advisor. The two developed a very close friendship and Lord Beaverbrook, who had been a widower for many years, came to have great respect for her. In June 1963 the eighty-four-year-old Beaverbrook and the fifty-three-year-old Lady Dunn married. Lord Beaverbrook had already used his fortune to greatly benefit the citizens of the province of New Brunswick in Canada. By virtue of their marriage, Aitken was able to name her the legal overseer of a large part of his estate that he wished to go to further charitable works.

== Philanthropist ==
Lord Beaverbrook died a year after their marriage and Lady Beaverbrook was left with the responsibility of large benevolent fund. With this, and the funds from her first husband's estate, she became one of Canada's most prominent philanthropists. On behalf of her first husband considerable funds were donated to his alma mater, Dalhousie University in Halifax, Nova Scotia. In 1967, she was awarded an honorary Doctor of Law (LL.D.) from that institution and in 1968 she was appointed the University's Chancellor, a position she held for the next twenty-seven years.

== Assassination attempt ==
Lady Beaverbrook's high profile in British society and the publicity from her philanthropic work resulted in an assassination attempt. On 4 May 1971 a bomb was strapped to the underside of her Rolls-Royce Phantom VI car (which is coloured green and brown, her horse racing colours), placed there by The Angry Brigade, a British terrorist group. The device was detected before it could explode. The car was donated to the National Motor Museum, Beaulieu, which sold it at auction in 2015.

== Personal interests ==
A devotee of show horses and equestrian events, she was also a leading race-horse owner, spending a vast amount of money on horses. Her horses almost always had names made up of seven letters. Amongst the many thoroughbreds she owned were:

- Boldboy - a gelding, who won twelve group races including the Lockinge Stakes and Sprint Cup, on his retirement he was the highest ever stakes-winning gelding to have raced in the United Kingdom
- Bustino - won the 1974 St. Leger Stakes and the 1975 Coronation Cup and was her highest rated racehorse
- Relkino - won the 1977 Lockinge Stakes and Benson and Hedges Gold Cup as well as being runner-up in the 1976 Epsom Derby
- Niniski - a son of the great Nijinsky II, he won the 1979 Prix Royal-Oak at Longchamp and the Irish St. Leger, then became one of the leading sires in flat racing.
- Petoski - won the 1985 Prince of Wales's Stakes and the King George VI and Queen Elizabeth Stakes
- Minster Son - won the 1988 St. Leger Stakes
- Terimon - runner-up in the 1989 Epsom Derby and won the 1991 International Stakes
- Mystiko - won the 1991 2,000 Guineas

She started owning horses in the late 60s and initially had her horses trained by Sir Gordon Richards. In 1971 on his retirement, she transferred them to Dick Hern. In later years she had horses with Clive Brittain. She bred horses as well as owning them.

== Legacy ==
Lady Beaverbrook died in 1994 having donated the equivalent of nearly $300 million (at today's value) to support education, cultural undertakings and wildlife preservation. In addition to the charitable trusts from both of her husbands, the Christofor Foundation for charitable purposes was established by friends out of her personal estate. A lover of animals, among the many philanthropic causes Lady Beaverbrook supported, the established the Sir James Dunn Animal Welfare Centre at the University of Prince Edward Island with a $2.2 million gift. Amongst other worthwhile causes, the Foundation from her personal estate also helped fund the Science East Association in Fredericton, New Brunswick. Because the Province of New Brunswick was home to both of her husbands, it contains many institutions built with funding from their estates. However, large contributions were made to numerous causes throughout the four Atlantic Provinces, most notably in education. In her memory, the Sir James Dunn Foundation of Saint John, New Brunswick made a $1 million donation toward the establishment of a student residence bearing her name at Acadia University in Wolfville, Nova Scotia. Christofor Hall was officially opened on 26 October 2002.

== Sources ==
- Lord Beaverbrook (1961). Courage: The Story of Sir James Dunn. Fredericton, NB: Brunswick Press.

Academic offices
| Vacant Title last held by C. D. Howe | Chancellor of Dalhousie University; 1968 – 1990 | Succeeded by H. Reuben Cohen |
