= One So Wonderful =

British-bred Thoroughbred racehorse

- Sire: Nashwan
- Grandsire: Blushing Groom
- Dam: Someone Special
- Damsire: Habitat
- Sex: Mare
- Foaled: 4 May 1994
- Country: United Kingdom
- Colour: Bay
- Breeder: Meon Valley Stud
- Owner: Helena Springfield Ltd
- Trainer: Luca Cumani
- Record: 8: 5-0-0
- Earnings: £262,647

Major wins
- Atalanta Stakes (1997); Sun Chariot Stakes (1997); Golden Daffodil Stakes (1998); International Stakes (1998)

One So Wonderful (4 May 1994 – 6 February 2012) was a British Thoroughbred racehorse and broodmare. A temperamental filly who was sometimes difficult to train, she is best known for winning the International Stakes in 1998. After winning on her only appearance as a two-year-old she won both her races in 1997 including the Sun Chariot Stakes. She was beaten on her debut as a four-year-old but then won the Golden Daffodil Stakes before defeating male opposition in the International Stakes. She was beaten in her two remaining races and was retired to stud where she had modest success as a broodmare.

== Background ==
One So Wonderful was a bay filly with a small white star bred by Egon Weinfeld's Meon Valley Stud in Hampshire. She was one of the best horses sired by Nashwan, the 1989 Epsom Derby winner. Her dam Something Special won once from five races and finished third in the Coronation Stakes. Her other foals included the Dante Stakes winner Alnasr Alwasheek and the Rockfel Stakes winner Relatively Special. Something Special was a daughter of the 1000 Guineas winner One in a Million and a close relative of the classic winners Full Dress and Commanche Run.

Like the other horses raced by the Meon Valley Stud, One So Wonderful competed in the black and white colours of Helena Springfield Ltd a company owned by Egon Weinfeld. She was trained by Luca Cumani at his Bedford Lodge stables in Newmarket, Suffolk.

== Racing career ==
=== 1996: two-year-old season ===
One So Wonderful never contested a maiden race, beginning her racing career in the Milcar's Fillies' Conditions Stakes over seven furlongs at Kempton Park Racecourse in September. Starting at odds of 5/1 she took the lead approaching the final furlong and won "comfortably" by three and a half lengths from ten opponents. Following the race she was made favourite for the following season's 1000 Guineas.

=== 1997: three-year-old season ===
One So Wonderful missed the early part of her three-year-old season and did not appear until 30 August, almost a year after her previous run. She had not been injured, but had been very slow to reach peak condition and was sent back to her owners for a break in May and June. Despite her absence she was made one of four 11/2 co-favourites for the Atalanta Stakes (now a Group Three race) over one mile at Sandown Park Racecourse. Ridden by the veteran Pat Eddery she took the lead a furlong from the finish and accelerated clear of her thirteen opponents to win easily by eight lengths. For her only other race of the year the filly was moved up in class and distance for the Sun Chariot Stakes over ten furlongs at Newmarket racecourse on 4 October, when she started second favourite behind the Oaks winner Reams of Verse. Ridden by John Reid she led for most of the way and got the better of what was described as a "thrilling battle" with Kool Kat Katie in the final furlong to win by a neck, with Reams of Verse three and a half lengths away in third. The runner-up went on to win the Grade I E. P. Taylor Stakes in Canada two weeks later.

=== 1998: four-year-old season ===
On her first run as a four-year-old, One So Wonderful was matched against male opposition for the first time in the Brigadier Gerard Stakes at Sandown in May. She started 11/4 favourite but did not recover after being hampered two furlongs from the finish and finished seventh of the nine runners behind the five-year-old Insatiable. She had compromised her chance by becoming highly agitated before the race; according to Luca Cumani "she got her knickers in a twist". In attempt to calm the filly's nerves she regularly accompanied her stable companions to the racecourse in the following weeks even when he was not scheduled to compete. After a two-month break from racing, the filly was returned to all-female competition for the Listed Golden Daffodil Stakes over ten furlong at Chepstow Racecourse. She was made the 11/8 favourite and won by three and a half lengths from the Middleton Stakes winner Arriving. Cumani described the race as "a nice confidence booster".

In August One So Wonderful was stepped up to Group One class for the first time when she was one of three fillies in a field of eight runners for the International Stakes over ten and a half furlong at York Racecourse. Ridden by Eddery, she was the 6/1 fourth choice in the betting behind Faithful Son (winner of the Prince of Wales's Stakes), Chester House and Limpid (Grand Prix de Paris). She was among the leaders in the start and despite coming under pressure in the straight but made steady progress along the inside rail and took the lead on the line to win in a three-way photo-finish from Faithful Sun and Chester House. After the race Cumani admitted that he thought the filly had finished second, but paid tribute to his winner, saying that "she has always been highly promising. You don't compile a record of wins like hers without being very good". Eddery said: "She's very honest and very game. They had her and she came back at them, just like she did in the Sun Chariot last year. She gave me everything and quickened all the way to the line."

The riders of the first three finishers all received riding bans from the racecourse stewards for excessive use of their whips. Frankie Dettori, the rider of Faithful Sun described the stewards' decision as "predictable and pitiful". The race was not considered a particularly strong edition of the International, with one journalist describing it as "a Group 2 race for a Group 1 prize".

One So Wonderful ran in two more races, but failed to win. In September she finished fourth behind Swain, Alborada and Xaar in the Irish Champion Stakes, beaten a total of two lengths. A month later she ended her racing career by finishing fifth behind Alborada in the Champion Stakes at Newmarket. Cumani felt that she was unlucky in the race saying that the pace had been too slow and that "by the time she moved up, she got blocked and the race was over."

== Assessment ==
One So Wonderful was the highest-rated older female racehorse in Europe in 1998.

Luca Cumani called her "a beautiful filly who's given enormous pleasure".

== Breeding record ==
At the end of her racing career, One So Wonderful returned to her birthplace to become a broodmare at the Meon Valley Stud, where she produced eight foals between 2001 and 2011. She died in February 2012. The best of her foals was Sun Boat, a gelding sired by Machiavellian who won the Grade II San Diego Handicap at Del Mar Racetrack in 2007. Another descendant was Hoo Ya Mal. a colt who ran second in the 2022 Epsom Derby.

== Pedigree ==
Pedigree of One So Wonderful (GB), bay mare, 1994
Sire Nashwan (USA) 1986	Blushing Groom (FR); 1974	Red God	Nasrullah
Sire Nashwan (USA) 1986	Blushing Groom (FR); 1974	Red God	Spring Run
Sire Nashwan (USA) 1986	Blushing Groom (FR); 1974	Runaway Bride	Wild Risk
Sire Nashwan (USA) 1986	Blushing Groom (FR); 1974	Runaway Bride	Aimée
Sire Nashwan (USA) 1986	Height of Fashion (GB); 1979	Bustino	Busted
Sire Nashwan (USA) 1986	Height of Fashion (GB); 1979	Bustino	Ship Yard
Sire Nashwan (USA) 1986	Height of Fashion (GB); 1979	Highclere	Queen's Hussar
Sire Nashwan (USA) 1986	Height of Fashion (GB); 1979	Highclere	Highlight
Dam Someone Special (GB) 1983	Habitat (USA); 1966	Sir Gaylord	Turn-To
Dam Someone Special (GB) 1983	Habitat (USA); 1966	Sir Gaylord	Somethingroyal
Dam Someone Special (GB) 1983	Habitat (USA); 1966	Little Hut	Occupy
Dam Someone Special (GB) 1983	Habitat (USA); 1966	Little Hut	Savage Beauty
Dam Someone Special (GB) 1983	One in a Million (IRE); 1976	Rarity	Hethersett
Dam Someone Special (GB) 1983	One in a Million (IRE); 1976	Rarity	Who Can Tell
Dam Someone Special (GB) 1983	One in a Million (IRE); 1976	Singe	Tudor Music
Dam Someone Special (GB) 1983	One in a Million (IRE); 1976	Singe	Trial by Fire (Family: 16-h)
