= Necklace (horse) =

British-bred Thoroughbred racehorse

- Sire: Darshaan
- Grandsire: Shirley Heights
- Dam: Spinning the Yarn
- Damsire: Barathea
- Sex: Mare
- Foaled: 24 February 2001
- Country: United Kingdom
- Colour: Bay
- Breeder: Meon Valley Stud
- Owner: Susan Magnier and Michael Tabor
- Trainer: Aidan O'Brien
- Record: 9: 2-1-1
- Earnings: £210,141

Major wins
- Debutante Stakes (2003); Moyglare Stud Stakes (2003)

Necklace (foaled 24 February 2001) is a British, Irish-trained Thoroughbred racehorse and broodmare. She had her greatest success as a two-year-old in 2003 when she won two of her four races including the Debutante Stakes and the Moyglare Stud Stakes. In the following year failed to win but did finish third in the Beverly D. Stakes and fourth in the Epsom Oaks before being retired from racing with a record of two wins from nine starts in four different counties. She had very little success as a broodmare, producing only one minor winner.

== Background ==
Necklace is a bay mare bred in England by the Hampshire-based Meon Valley Stud. As a yearling in October 2002, the filly was consigned to the Tattersalls sale and was bought for 600,000 guineas by the bloodstock agent Dermot "Demi" O'Byrne on behalf John Magnier's Coolmore Stud organisation. She was sent into training with Aidan O'Brien at Ballydoyle. During her racing career she raced for the partnership of Michael Tabor and Susan Magnier, usually carrying the blue and orange colours of Tabor.

She was sired by Darshaan who won the Prix du Jockey Club for the Aga Khan in 1984 before becoming a successful breeding stallion. The best of his other offspring included Dalakhani, Mark of Esteem and Kotashaan. Necklace's dam Spinning the Yarn showed noracing ability, finishing seventh in her only race but was a daughter of the Irish Oaks winner Colorspin, making her a half-sister to Opera House and Kayf Tara.

== Racing career ==
=== 2003: two-year-old season ===
Necklace was ridden in all of her races by Mick Kinane. On her racecourse debut she faced eleven opponents in a maiden race over six furlongs on 12 July at the Curragh. She was made the 3/1 favourite but despite recovering from a poor start she failed to overhaul the Jim Bolger-trained Soviet Belle and was beaten three quarters of a length into second place. The filly was then stepped up to Group 3 class for the Debutante Stakes over seven furlongs at the same track four weeks later and started 7/4 favourite against twelve opponents. She was restrained towards the rear before coming through to take the lead a furlong out and winning by a length from the British-trained Caldy Dancer with Red Feather in third.

On 31 August Necklace was moved up again in class for the Group 1 Moyglare Stud Stakes and started 5/4 favourite in an eleven-runner field. Soviet Belle and Red Feather were again in opposition while the other fancied runners included River Belle (Princess Margaret Stakes) and Maroochydore (Silver Flash Stakes). Kinane restrained the filly in the early stages as her stablemate Oh So Precious set the pace before giving way to the Clive Brittain-trained Menhoubah approaching the last quarter mile. Necklace moved into third place a furlong out and finished strongly to take the lead and win by a length and a short head from Red Feather and Menhoubah. Commenting on the winner's future prospects Kinane said "Another furlong would be really up her street. She is going to be an Oaks filly next season and she would have a shout in the 1,000 Guineas too". Aidan O'Brien said "Necklace has improved with each run and is a lovely filly."

On her final race of the year Necklace was sent to France for the Group 1 Prix Marcel Boussac over 1400 metres at Longchamp Racecourse on 5 October. She started favourite but never looked to have any chance of winning and came home tenth of the sixteen runners behind Denebola.

=== 2004: three-year-old season ===
Necklace began her second season in the 191st running of the 1000 Guineas over the Rowley mile at Newmarket Racecourse on 2 May. She started at odds of 8/1 and made no impact, tiring in the last quarter mile and finishing twelfth behind Attraction. She did a little better in the Irish 1000 Guineas three weeks later when she came home sixth behind Attraction, beaten six lengths by the winner. On 4 June the filly was moved up in distance for the 225th Epsom Oaks over one and a half miles in which she finished fourth behind Ouija Board, All Too Beautiful and Punctilious.

In autumn Nacklace was sent to compete in the United States where she contested two races. In August she started a 25/1 outsider for the Beverly D. Stakes at Arlington Park and finished strongly to take third place, beaten half a length and a head by Crimson Palace and Riskaverse. At Belmont Park in September she started second favourite for the Garden City Breeders' Cup Handicap but finished fourth of the seven runners behind Lucifer's Stone.

== Breeding record ==
After her retirement from racing Necklace became a broodmare for the Coolmore Stud. She was repeatedly mated with Sadler's Wells, who was her great-grandfather, or to that stallions male-line descendants. She produced one minor winner from eight foals:

- Sapphire Bracelet, a bay filly, foaled in 2006, sired by Sadler's Wells. Failed to win in three races.
- Scottish Reel, bay colt (later gelded), 2007 by Sadler's Wells. Failed to win in 28 races.
- Ruby Necklace, bay filly, 2008, by Sadler's Wells. Unraced.
- Purple, bay filly, 2009, Galileo. Won one race.
- Quel Avantage, bay colt, 2010, by Galileo. Failed to win in five races.
- Gold Bracelet, bay filly, 2013, by Montjeu. Unplaced in only race.
- Afternoon, bay filly, 2014, by Rip Van Winkle. Unplaced in only race.
- California Gold, filly, 2015, by Camelot. Failed to win in two races.

== Pedigree ==
Pedigree of Necklace (GB), bay mare, 2001
Sire Darshaan (GB) 1981	Shirley Heights (GB); 1975	Mill Reef	Never Bend
Sire Darshaan (GB) 1981	Shirley Heights (GB); 1975	Mill Reef	Milan Mill
Sire Darshaan (GB) 1981	Shirley Heights (GB); 1975	Hardiemma	Hardicanute
Sire Darshaan (GB) 1981	Shirley Heights (GB); 1975	Hardiemma	Grand Cross
Sire Darshaan (GB) 1981	Delsy (FR); 1972	Abdos	Arbar
Sire Darshaan (GB) 1981	Delsy (FR); 1972	Abdos	Pretty Lady
Sire Darshaan (GB) 1981	Delsy (FR); 1972	Kelty	Venture VII
Sire Darshaan (GB) 1981	Delsy (FR); 1972	Kelty	Marilla
Dam Spinning the Yarn (GB) 1996	Barathea (IRE); 1990	Sadler's Wells	Northern Dancer
Dam Spinning the Yarn (GB) 1996	Barathea (IRE); 1990	Sadler's Wells	Fairy Bridge
Dam Spinning the Yarn (GB) 1996	Barathea (IRE); 1990	Brocade	Habitat
Dam Spinning the Yarn (GB) 1996	Barathea (IRE); 1990	Brocade	Canton Silk
Dam Spinning the Yarn (GB) 1996	Colorspin (GB); 1983	High Top	Derring-Do
Dam Spinning the Yarn (GB) 1996	Colorspin (GB); 1983	High Top	Camenae
Dam Spinning the Yarn (GB) 1996	Colorspin (GB); 1983	Reprocolor	Jimmy Reppin
Dam Spinning the Yarn (GB) 1996	Colorspin (GB); 1983	Reprocolor	Blue Queen (Family: 13-e)
