= Kala Dancer =

British-bred Thoroughbred racehorse

- Sire: Niniski
- Grandsire: Nijinsky
- Dam: Kalazero
- Damsire: Kalamoun
- Sex: Stallion
- Foaled: 17 April 1982
- Country: United States
- Colour: Grey
- Breeder: Scuderia Gibierre
- Owner: Ravi Tikkoo
- Trainer: Ben Hanbury; Laz Barrera
- Record: 9: 2-1-0

Major wins
- Dewhurst Stakes (1984)

Awards
- Top-rated European two-year-old (1984); Timeform top-rated two-year-old (1984); Timeform rating 129 (1984)

Kala Dancer (17 April 1982 – 23 August 2004) was a British-bred Thoroughbred racehorse and sire. His reputation as a racehorse rested almost entirely on his upset win in the 1984 Dewhurst Stakes, which was sufficient to see him rated the best two-year-old of that year in Europe. He failed in his only start of 1985 and failed to make any impression when raced in the United States in 1986. He was subsequently exported to Australia, where he proved to be a successful breeding stallion.

== Background ==
Kala Dancer was a "big, rangy" grey horse bred in Britain by the Italian-based Scuderia Gibierre. He was from the first crop of foals sired by Niniski, the winner of the Irish St Leger and Prix Royal Oak. Niniski also sired the King George VI and Queen Elizabeth Stakes winner Petoski in the same year as Kala Dancer and was the leading first-season sire in Great Britain and Ireland in 1984. Kala Dancer's dam Kalazero also produced Our Eliaso, an Italian-trained colt who won the Listed Prix de Claireforntaine and was placed in the Derby Italiano and the Gran Premio di Milano. Another of her foals, Kalisha, was the dam of the German 1,000 Guineas winner Rose of Zollern.

As a yearling, Kala Dancer was twice offered for sale at Newmarket in 1983. At the July sale he was sold for 7,200 guineas, and in October he fetched 11,000 guineas at the Open Sales. He entered the ownership of the Indian shipping magnate Ravi Tikkoo and was sent into training with Ben Hanbury at his Diomed Stable in Newmarket.

== Racing career ==
=== 1984: two-year-old season ===
Kala Dancer did not appear on the racecourse until October, when he was one of 27 two-year-olds to contest the Westley Maiden Stakes over seven furlongs at Newmarket Racecourse. Starting a 33/1 outsider, he took the lead soon after the start, and won by one and a half lengths from Al Riyadh, with the highly regarded favourite Shadeed in third. Two weeks later, the colt was moved up sharply in class to contest Britain's most prestigious two-year-old race, the Group One Dewhurst Stakes over the same course and distance. The undefeated Irish-trained colt Law Society was made favourite ahead of the Mill Reef Stakes winner Local Suitor, while Kala Dancer, ridden by Geoff Baxter, started at odds of 20/1 in a field of eleven runners. In contrast to the cheaply bought Kala Dancer, Law Society and Local Suitor had cost $2.7 million and $2 million respectively. Baxter settled Kala Dancer in second place before moving into the lead three furlongs from the finish but was soon overtaken by Local Suitor as Law Society moved up to challenge. Kala Dancer rallied strongly and the closing stages of the race saw a very close three-way contest with the grey making a renewed challenge with Local Suitor on his right and Law Society on his left. Despite being hampered by Law Society, who edged to the right in the final furlong, Kala Dancer prevailed by a head from the Irish colt, with Local Suitor a head away in third.

=== 1985: three-year-old season ===
Kala Dancer reportedly had training problems in the early part of 1985 and when he made his seasonal debut in the 2000 Guineas over the Rowley Mile course at Newmarket on 4 May he started a 20/1 outsider. Ridden by Baxter he was never in contention and finished eleventh of the fourteen runners behind Shadeed. Later that month he suffered a broken blood vessel in training and did not race again in Europe.

=== 1986: four-year-old season ===
Kala Dancer was sent to California as a four-year-old, where he was trained by Laz Barrera and campaigned at Santa Anita Park. He had no success in six races, with his only placing coming when he finished second in an allowance race. His last racecourse appearance was the San Jacinto Handicap on 21 April 1986, when he finished sixth.

== Assessment ==
The independent Timeform organisation gave Kala Dancer a rating of 129 and named him as their best two-year-old of the season although Law Society was given the same figure. In the official International Classification, he was rated the best two-year-old in Europe, one pound ahead of Law Society and two ahead of Local Suitor, Gold Crest and the top filly Triptych.

== Stud record ==
After his retirement from racing, Kala Dancer was exported to stand as a breeding stallion in Australia. The most successful of his offspring was Subzero, who won the South Australian Derby, Adelaide Cup and Melbourne Cup in 1992. Kala Dancer's other major winners included Angst (Flight Stakes) and Firing Range WATC Derby. He died on 23 August 2004.

== Pedigree ==
Pedigree of Kala Dancer (GB), grey stallion, 1982
Sire Niniski (USA) 1976	Nijinsky (CAN); 1967	Northern Dancer	Nearctic
Sire Niniski (USA) 1976	Nijinsky (CAN); 1967	Northern Dancer	Natalma
Sire Niniski (USA) 1976	Nijinsky (CAN); 1967	Flaming Page	Bull Page
Sire Niniski (USA) 1976	Nijinsky (CAN); 1967	Flaming Page	Flaring Top
Sire Niniski (USA) 1976	Virginia Hills (USA); 1971	Tom Rolfe	Ribot
Sire Niniski (USA) 1976	Virginia Hills (USA); 1971	Tom Rolfe	Pocahontas
Sire Niniski (USA) 1976	Virginia Hills (USA); 1971	Ridin' Easy	Ridan
Sire Niniski (USA) 1976	Virginia Hills (USA); 1971	Ridin' Easy	Easy Eight
Dam Kalazero (IRE) 1976	Kalamoun (GB); 1970	Zeddaan	Grey Sovereign
Dam Kalazero (IRE) 1976	Kalamoun (GB); 1970	Zeddaan	Vareta
Dam Kalazero (IRE) 1976	Kalamoun (GB); 1970	Khairunissa	Prince Bio
Dam Kalazero (IRE) 1976	Kalamoun (GB); 1970	Khairunissa	Palariva
Dam Kalazero (IRE) 1976	Roulette (GER); 1969	Blauer Reiter	Birkhahn
Dam Kalazero (IRE) 1976	Roulette (GER); 1969	Blauer Reiter	Blaue Grotte
Dam Kalazero (IRE) 1976	Roulette (GER); 1969	Rah	Tudor Minstrel
Dam Kalazero (IRE) 1976	Roulette (GER); 1969	Rah	Rose of Doncaster (Family:19)
