= Ascot Stakes =

Flat horse race in Britain

Ascot Stakes
2026
Kizlyar	Defiantly	Tim Toe

Previous years
2025
Ascending	Nurburgring	Comfort Zone
2024
Pledgeofallegiance	Divine Comedy	Kyle Of Lochalsh
2023
Ahorsewithnoname	Calling The Wind	Tritonic
2022
Coltrane	Bring On The Night	Arcadian Sunrise
2021
Reshoun	M C Muldoon	Elysian Flame

2020-2011
2020
Coeur de Lion	Verdana Blue	Summer Moon
2019
The Grand Visir	Buildmeupbuttercup	Time To Study
2018
Lagostovegas	Dubawi Fifty	Stratum
2017
Thomas Hobson	Endless Acres	Who Dares Wins
2016
Jennies Jewel	Qewy	Mill Springs
2015
Clondaw Warrior	Fun Mac	Elishpour
2014
Domination	Another Cocktail	Sizzler
2013
Well Sharp	Tiger Cliff	Lieutenant Miller
2012
Simenon	Al Khawaneej	Nafaath
2011
Veiled	Ermyn Lodge	Phoenix Flight

2010-2001
2010
Junior	Elyaadi	Aaim To Prosper
2009
Judgethemoment	Sesenta	Royal Rationale
2008
Missoula	Mamlook	Liberate
2007
Full House	Juniper Girl	Som Tala
2006
Baddam	Top The Charts	Shamayoun
2005
Leg Spinner	Golden Quest	Coconut Beach
2004
Double Obsession	Promoter	Penny Pictures
2003
Sindapour	Landing Light	It's Definite
2002
Riyadh	Establishment	Mana D'Argent
2001
Cover Up	First Ballot	Persian Waters

2000-1991
2000
Barba Papa	Seliana	Heros Fatal
1999
High And Mighty	Far Cry	Western Chief
1998
San Sebastian	Rainbow Frontier	Sea Freedom
1997
Sea Freedom	Shirley Sue	Arcady
1996
Southern Power	Mirador	Candle Smile
1995
Harlestone Brook	Art Form	Smuggling
1994
Sweet Glow	Bardolph	Doyce
1993
Balasani	Doyce	Jack Button
1992
Gondolier	Requested	Crystal Spirit
1991
Cabochon	Haitham	Good Hand

1990-1988
1990
Retouch	Lucky Verdict	Major Inquiry
1989
Arizelos	Santella Bobkes	Beauchamp Cactus
1988
Zero Watt	Old Hubert	Russian Affair
1985
Meadowbrook	Accuracy	Trapeze Artist

The Ascot Stakes is a flat handicap horse race in Great Britain open to horses aged four years or older. It is run at Ascot over a distance of 2 miles 3 furlongs and 210 yards (4,014 metres), and it is scheduled to take place each year in June on the first day of the Royal Ascot meeting.

== Winners since 1878 ==
Year	Winner	Age	Weight	Jockey	Trainer	Time
1878	Chesterton	4	06-08
1879	Riddoto	4	07-11
1880	Teviotdale	3	05-13
1881	Teviotdale	4	08-02
1882	Retreat	5	08-07
1883	Ishmael	5	07-10
1884	Greenbank	4	07-06
1885	Althorp	3	06-12
1886	Belinda	5	07-01
1887	Eurasian	5	08-06
1888	Dan Dancer	4	06-07
1889	Lord Lorne	3	06-07
1890	Lord Lorne	4	07-13
1891	Houndsditch	5	07-09
1892	Billow	4	06-07
1893	Enniskillen	5	08-07
1894	Aborigine	4	07-12
1895	Ravensbury	5	09-09
1896	Arlequin	3	06-05
1897	Masque II	3	07-09
1898	Herminius	4	07-11	Charles Wood	Charles Peck	3:42.60
1899	Tom Cringle	4	07-09	Sam Loates	C Wood	3:42.00
1900	Baldur	4	07-02	Tod Sloan	Fred Lynham	3:39.80
1901	Sinopi	5	08-02	Danny Maher	Sam Darling	3:36.00
1902	Scullion	4	06-12	Walter Bray	Sherrard	3:41.60
1903	Genius	5	07-00	Elijah Wheatley	Alf Sadler Jr.
1904	Merry Andrew	5	07-06	John Rollason	G Miller	3:22.40
1905	Sandboy	5	08-07	Herbert Jones	Jack Robinson	3:29.00
1906	Pradella	Aged	08-04	Otto Madden	Alec Taylor Jr.
1907	Torpoint	Aged	08-04	Otto Madden	Alec Taylor Jr.	3:24.20
1908	Turbine	5	07-11	William Griggs	Platt	3:22.60
1909	Rushcutter	4	08-05	Frank Wootton	John Brewer	3:37.80
1910	Declare	4	08-03	William Griggs	Alec Taylor Jr.
1911	Willonyx	4	08-04	Billy Higgs	Sam Darling	3:24.00
1912	Policeman	4	07-12	Herbert Robbins	Claude Halsey	3:36.40
1913	Rivoli	4	08-01	Edwin Piper	Richard Dawson	3:25.40
1914	Broadwood	4	06-02	Percy Allden	Fred Pratt	3:26.20
	no race 1915-18
1919	Haki	7	08-06	Joe Childs	Alec Taylor Jr.
1920	Happy Man	4	09-03	Izaak Strydom	Thomas Hogg	3:28.80
1921	Spearwort	4	08-03	Hector Gray	Felix Leach	3:22.80
1922	Double Hackle	4	07-03	Herbert Robbins	Tom Cannon Jr.	3:22.00
1923	Juniso	5	08-01	Frank Bullock	Alec Taylor Jr.	3:26.40
1924	Scullion	4	07-11	Charlie Smirke	Thomas Hogg	3:31.60
1925	Mandelieu	4	07-08	Tommy Weston	Ted Lambton	3:25.00
1926	Miss Sport	5	06-07	Alfred Berry	Humphrey Cottrill	3:42.00
1927	Duke Of Buckingham	4	07-10	Gordon Richards	Alec Taylor Jr.	3:26.40
1928	Brown Jack	4	07-13	Steve Donoghue	Aubrey Hastings	3:33.00
1929	Old Orkney	5	08-04	Freddy Lane	Richard Gooch	3:25.80
1930	Bonny Boy II	6	08-05	Pat Beasley	Victor Gilpin	3:28.60
1931	Noble Star	4	07-10	Freddie Fox	Len Cundell	3:31.80
1932 (dh)	Son Of Mint; Sandy Lashes	5; 4	08-02; 06-09	Harry Wragg; Bill Elliott	A Douglas-Pennant; Len Cundell	3:27.60
1933	Roi De Paris	5	07-09	Cyril Buckham	A Douglas-Pennant	3:31.60
1934	Hands Off	4	07-01	Albert Richardson	George Digby	3:30.40
1935	Doreen Jane	5	06-11	Doug Smith	Humphrey Cottrill	3:35.40
1936	Bouldnor	4	07-06	Kenneth Robertson	Harvey Leader	3:27.40
1937	Valerian	4	08-13	Tommy Weston	Joseph Lawson	3:25.80
1938	Frawn	4	07-12	Eph Smith	Geoffrey Barling	4:24.00
1939	Frawn	5	08-10	Eph Smith	Geoffrey Barling	4:27.00
	no race 1940-45
1946	Reynard Volant	4	07-12	Eph Smith	Jack Jarvis	4:35.60
1947	Reynard Volant	5	09-04	Eph Smith	Jack Jarvis	4:23.20
1948	No Orchids	5	08-11	Harry Blackshaw	M Everitt	4:27.40
1949	Hilali	5	07-04	Frankie Durr	George Digby	4:24.00
1950	Honorable II	6	08-04	Rae Johnstone	Herbert Blagrave	4:22.40
1951	Guerrier (Note: Royaliste IV was first past the post, but was disqualified for crossing two furlongs from home.)	6	06-12	Tommy Mahon	Willie Stephenson	4:24.60
1952	Flighty Frances	4	07-09	Doug Smith	Joe Dines	4:24.80
1953	Pluchino	4	07-12	Ted Fordyce	D F Watson	4:31.40
1954	Corydalis	5	07-02	John Forte	Fred Sneyd	4:39.20
1955	Wildnor	4	07-00	Charlie Gaston	Charles Carlos-Clarke	4:27.83
1956	Zarathustra	5	09-00	Harry Carr	Cecil Boyd-Rochfort	4:31.42
1957	Bonhomie	8	06-08	Michael Hayes	Eric Cousins	4:21.77
1958	Sandiacre	6	08-13	Harry Carr	Bill Dutton	4:28.60
1959	Rugosa	4	07-12	Eph Smith	Ted Leader	4:31.34
1960	Shatter	4	07-09	Bobby Elliott	Tom Masson	4:31.96
1961	Angazi	5	08-01	Duncan Keith	Walter Nightingall	4:34.94
1962	Trelawny	6	09-08	Scobie Breasley	George Todd	4:35.50
1963	Trelawny	7	10-00	Scobie Breasley	George Todd	4:45.95
1964	Delmere	4	07-02	Des Cullen	Willie Stephenson	4:31.06
1965	Harvest Gold	6	08-12	Frankie Durr	Tommy Robson	4:29.75
1966	Tubalcain	5	08-00	Geoff Lewis	Ted Goddard	4:21.36
1967	Shira	7	07-09	John Hayward	George Todd	4:23.95
1968	King Of Peace	5	07-12	Tony Murray	J Hardy	4:29.20
1969	Lexicon	5	08-11	Lester Piggott	Ryan Price	4:24.25
1970	Magna Carta	4	08-04	Geoff Lewis	Ian Balding	4:21.73
1971	Celtic Cone	4	08-13	Willie Carson	Bernard van Cutsem	4:53.64
1972	Balios	4	08-10	Jimmy Lindley	Mick O'Toole	4:25.98
1973	Full Of Beans	5	07-11	Paul Cook	Bill Marshall	4:22.85
1974	Kambalda	4	08-09	Joe Mercer	Henry Candy	4:30.17
1975	Crash Course	4	09-04	Tony Kimberley	Jeremy Hindley	4:26.89
1976	Tudor Crown	5	07-07	John Lowe	Jeremy Hindley	4:22.09
1977	Matinale	4	07-08	Ernie Johnson	Barry Hills	4:35.53
1978	Mountain Cross	6	09-11	John Lowe	Bill Watts	4:27.45
1979	Mon's Beau	4	07-02	Walter Swinburn	E Beeson	4:33.58
1980	Heighlin	4	07-12	Richard Fox	David Elsworth	4:31.43
1981	Atlantic Traveller	4	07-12	George Duffield	Bill Watts	4:22.42
1982	Popsis Joy	7	08-11	Willie Carson	Mick Haynes	4:29.96
1983	Right Regent	5	08-08	Steve Cauthen	Martin Pipe	4:24.35
1984	Kayudee	4	08-09	Tony Murray	Jimmy Fitzgerald	4:26.16
1985	Meadowbrook	4	08-06	Pat Eddery	Ian Balding	4:27.76
1986	Rikki Tavi	6	07-10	Willie Carson	Barry Hills	4:27.66
1987	Inlander	6	07-07	Nicky Adams	Reg Akehurst	4:28.75
1988	Zero Watt	4	09-03	Greville Starkey	Guy Harwood	4:21.94
1989	Arizelos	4	10-00	Steve Cauthen	Guy Harwood	4:23.94
1990	Retouch	4	08-02	Michael Roberts	Paul Cole	4:21.17
1991	Cabochon	4	08-06	Willie Carson	David Morley	4:30.04
1992	Gondolier	4	09-09	Pat Eddery	Henry Cecil	4:20.39
1993	Balasani	7	09-01	Mark Perrett	Martin Pipe	4:31.81
1994	Sweet Glow	7	08-06	Cash Asmussen	Martin Pipe	4:22.77
1995	Harlestone Brook	5	08-13	Michael Kinane	John Dunlop	4:25.30
1996	Southern Power	5	09-07	Olivier Peslier	Reg Akehurst	4:20.20
1997	Sea Freedom	6	08-03	Steve Drowne	Toby Balding	4:23.57
1998	San Sebastian	4	09-08	Eddie Ahern	Michael Grassick	4:29.87
1999	High And Mighty	4	09-06	Frankie Dettori	John Gosden	4:22.56
2000	Barba Papa	6	09-07	Johnny Murtagh	Tony Martin	4:25.91
2001	Cover Up	4	09-10	Kieren Fallon	Sir Michael Stoute	4:26.42
2002	Riyadh	4	09-05	Kieren Fallon	Martin Pipe	4:26.53
2003	Sindapour	5	08-03	Martin Dwyer	Martin Pipe	4:24.79
2004	Double Obsession	4	09-02	John Egan	Mark Johnston	4:20.99
2005 (Note: The 2005 running took place at York)	Leg Spinner	4	08-12	Fran Berry	Tony Martin	4:26.74
2006	Baddam	4	09-02	Ian Mongan	Mick Channon	4:22.04
2007	Full House	8	09-01	Jimmy Fortune	Paul Webber	4:18.29
2008	Missoula	5	09-00	Sam Hitchcott	Suzy Smith	4:28.61
2009	Judgethemoment	4	09-05	Richard Hughes	Jane Chapple-Hyam	4:25.55
2010	Junior	7	09-00	Seb Sanders	David Pipe	4:23.92
2011	Veiled	5	09-03	Eddie Ahern	Nicky Henderson	4:24.82
2012	Simenon	5	09-10	Ryan Moore	Willie Mullins	4:30.50
2013	Well Sharp	5	09-10	Fran Berry	Jonjo O'Neill	4:28.41
2014	Domination	7	09-07	Fran Berry	Charles Byrnes	4:20.30
2015	Clondaw Warrior	8	09-00	Ryan Moore	Willie Mullins	4:20.52
2016	Jennies Jewel	9	09-03	Ronan Whelan	Jarlath Fahey	4:34.70
2017	Thomas Hobson	7	09-10	Ryan Moore	Willie Mullins	4:17.62
2018	Lagostovegas	6	09-03	Andrea Atzeni	Willie Mullins	4:31.75
2019	The Grand Visir	5	09-10	Richard Kingscote	Ian Williams	4:28.34
2020	Coeur De Lion	7	08-10	Thore Hammer-Hansen	Alan King	4:27.51
2021	Reshoun	7	09-07	William Buick	Ian Williams	4:23.41
2022	Coltrane	5	09-05	Callum Hutchinson	Andrew Balding	4:26.25
2023	Ahorsewithnoname	8	09-08	William Buick	Nicky Henderson	4:32.05
2024	Pledgeofallegiance	4	08-13	Luke Morris	Sir Mark Prescott	4:21.99
2025	Ascending	6	09-07	Billy Lee	Henry de Bromhead	4:24.63
2026	Kizlyar	4	09-03	Joey Sheridan	Joseph O'Brien	4:20.94

== See also ==
- Horse racing in Great Britain
- List of British flat horse races
