= 1,000 Guineas Trial Stakes =

Discontinued flat horse race in Britain

- Class: Conditions
- Location: Ascot / Salisbury; England
- Final run: 9 April 1986
- Race type: Flat / Thoroughbred

Race information
- Distance: 7f (1,408 metres)
- Surface: Turf
- Qualification: Three-year-old fillies
- Purse: £8,000 (1986); 1st: £5,712

The 1,000 Guineas Trial Stakes was a flat horse race in Great Britain open to three-year-old fillies. It was run over a distance of 7 furlongs (1,408 metres), and it was scheduled to take place each year in early April.

== History ==
The event was originally held at Ascot. The present grading system was introduced in 1971, and the race was classed at Group 3 level. It was staged at Newmarket in 1978, and transferred to Salisbury in 1979. It was relegated from Group 3 status in 1983, and discontinued after 1986.

The race served as a trial for the 1000 Guineas Stakes. The last horse to win both events was Full Dress in 1969.

The equivalent race for colts was the 2,000 Guineas Trial Stakes.

== Records ==
Leading jockey (3 wins):

- Greville Starkey – Gilding (1976), Spring in Deepsea (1978), Go Leasing (1981)

Leading trainer (3 wins):

- Harry Wragg – Ileana (1968), Full Dress (1969), Cheveley Princess (1973)

== Winners ==
Year	Winner	Jockey	Trainer
1968	Ileana	Ron Hutchinson	Harry Wragg
1969	Full Dress	Ron Hutchinson	Harry Wragg
1970	Highest Hopes	Jimmy Lindley	Dick Hern
1971	Cawston's Pride	Brian Taylor	Freddie Maxwell
1972	Embroidery	Bill Williamson	Vincent O'Brien
1973	Cheveley Princess	Geoff Lewis	Harry Wragg
1974	Polygamy	Pat Eddery	Peter Walwyn
1975	Abandoned due to waterlogging
1976	Gilding	Greville Starkey	Ian Balding
1977	Sanedtki	Alain Lequeux	Olivier Douieb
1978	Spring in Deepsea	Greville Starkey	Luca Cumani
1979	Tudor Maid	Edward Hide	John Winter
1980	Battlewind	Ray Cochrane	Ron Sheather
1981	Go Leasing	Greville Starkey	Guy Harwood
1982	Rose of Montreaux	John Reid	Paul Cole
1983	Silverdip	Paul Cook	Ian Balding
1984	Meis El-Reem	Alain Lequeux	Olivier Douieb
1985	Dafayna	Walter Swinburn	Michael Stoute
1986	Migiyas	Richard Quinn	Paul Cole

== See also ==
- Horse racing in Great Britain
- List of British flat horse races
