= Full Dress =

French-bred Thoroughbred racehorse

- Sire: Shantung
- Grandsire: Sicambre
- Dam: Fusil
- Damsire: Fidalgo
- Sex: Mare
- Foaled: 1966
- Country: France
- Colour: Bay
- Breeder: White Lodge Stud
- Owner: R B Moller
- Trainer: Harry Wragg
- Record: 7: 3-0-0

Major wins
- Crookham Stakes (1968); 1000 Guineas Trial Stakes (1969); 1000 Guineas (1969)

Awards
- Timeform rating 115

Full Dress (foaled 1966) was a French-bred, British-trained Thoroughbred racehorse and broodmare best known for winning the classic 1000 Guineas in 1969. Full Dress was beaten on her first two starts as a two-year-old but then won the Crookham Stakes at Newbury Racecourse. In the following spring she won the 1000 Guineas Trial Stakes at Ascot before surviving and objection to win the Guineas. She was beaten in her two subsequent races and was retired to stud where she had some success as a broodmare.

== Background ==
Full Dress was a "neat and compact" bay mare with a narrow white blaze and one white foot bred in France by her owner R. B. "Budgie" Moller. She was sired by Shantung a French horse who finished third in the 1959 Epsom Derby and also sired The Oaks winner Ginevra. Full Dress was the first foal of her dam Fusil, a winner of one minor race. Fusil was a granddaughter of the influential broodmare Mitrailleuse, whose other descendants included Commanche Run, One in a Million (1000 Guineas) and Swiftfoot (Irish Oaks). The filly was sent into training with Harry Wragg at his Abington Place stable at Newmarket.

== Racing career ==
=== 1968: two-year-old season ===
Full Dress ran three times as a two-year-old in 1968, finishing unplaced on her debut and running fourth in her second start. On her final appearance of the year she won the Crookham Stakes over seven furlongs at Newbury Racecourse, beating a field which included Shoemaker, a colt who went on to finish second in the Derby.

=== 1969: three-year-old season ===
On her three-year-old debut win the 1000 Guineas Trial Stakes over seven furlongs at Ascot Racecourse. On 1 May Full Dress was one of thirteen fillies to contest the 156th running of the 1000 Guineas over the Rowley Mile course at Newmarket Racecourse. Ridden by the Australian jockey Ron Hutchinson she started at odds of 7/1. Full Dress produced a "burst of speed" to take the lead in the closing stages and won by one and a half lengths from the Lester Piggott-ridden Hecuba. Piggott lodged an objection against the winner for causing interference in the closing stages but after an enquiry by the racecourse stewards the result was upheld.

Full Dress failed to reproduce her classic winning form in two subsequent races. She was strongly fancied for the Oaks but pulled hard in the early stages and finished eighth of the fifteen runners behind Sleeping Partner. At Royal Ascot she finished fifth behind Lucyrowe in the Coronation Stakes.

== Assessment ==
The independent Timeform organisation gave Full Dress a rating of 115 one the lowest ever awarded to a classic winner. In their book, A Century of Champions, based on the Timeform rating system, John Randall and Tony Morris rated Full Dress a "poor" winner of the 1000 Guineas.

== Breeding record ==
Full Dress was retired to become a broodmare, but produced no major winners. The best off her foals was probably Fairly Hot, a filly who finished third in the Musidora Stakes and produced the Dante Stakes winner Hot Touch (rated 126 by Timeform in 1983).

== Pedigree ==
Pedigree of Full Dress (FR), bay mare, 1966
Sire Shantung (FR) 1956	Sicambre (FR); 1948	Prince Bio	Prince Rose
Sire Shantung (FR) 1956	Sicambre (FR); 1948	Prince Bio	Biologie
Sire Shantung (FR) 1956	Sicambre (FR); 1948	Sif	Rialto
Sire Shantung (FR) 1956	Sicambre (FR); 1948	Sif	Suavita
Sire Shantung (FR) 1956	Barley Corn (GB); 1950	Hyperion	Gainsborough
Sire Shantung (FR) 1956	Barley Corn (GB); 1950	Hyperion	Selene
Sire Shantung (FR) 1956	Barley Corn (GB); 1950	Schiaparelli	Schiavoni
Sire Shantung (FR) 1956	Barley Corn (GB); 1950	Schiaparelli	Aileen
Dam Fusil (GB) 1961	Fidalgo (GB); 1956	Arctic Star	Nearco
Dam Fusil (GB) 1961	Fidalgo (GB); 1956	Arctic Star	Serena
Dam Fusil (GB) 1961	Fidalgo (GB); 1956	Miss France	Jock
Dam Fusil (GB) 1961	Fidalgo (GB); 1956	Miss France	Nafah
Dam Fusil (GB) 1961	Mitraille (GB); 1953	Big Game	Bahram
Dam Fusil (GB) 1961	Mitraille (GB); 1953	Big Game	Myrobella
Dam Fusil (GB) 1961	Mitraille (GB); 1953	Mitrailleuse	Mieuxce
Dam Fusil (GB) 1961	Mitraille (GB); 1953	Mitrailleuse	French Kin (Family: 16-h)
