= Prix de Royallieu =

Flat horse in France

- Class: Group 1
- Location: Longchamp Racecourse; Paris, France
- Race type: Flat / Thoroughbred
- Sponsor: Qatar
- Website: france-galop.com

Race information
- Distance: 2,800 metres (1m 6f)
- Surface: Turf
- Track: Right-handed
- Qualification: Three-years-old and up fillies and mares exc. G1 winners this or last year
- Weight: 54½ kg (3yo); 57½ kg (4yo+); Penalties; 3 kg for Group 2 winners * 3 kg if two Group 3 wins * * since January 1
- Purse: €300,000 (2021); 1st: €171,420

Prix de Royallieu
2026
Fairy Glen	Sunly	Amelia Earhart

Previous years
2025
Consent	Santorini Star	Rabbit's Foot
2024
Grateful	River Of Stars	Mistral Star
2023
Sea Silk Road	Diva Donna	La Mehana
2022
Sea La Rosa	Jannah Flower	Ottilien
2021
Loving Dream	Believe In Love	Valia

2020-2011
2020
Wonderful Tonight	Pista	Ebaiyra
2019
Anapurna	Delphinia	Enbihaar
2018
Princess Yaiza	Palombe	Shahnaza
2017
The Juliet Rose	Listen In	Kitesurf
2016
The Juliet Rose	Almela	Sotteville
2015
Candarliya	Lady Of Kyushu	Scalambra
2014
Frine	Mayhem	Zarshana
2013
Ebiyza	Chalnetta	Galvaun
2012
Dalkala	Shirocco Star	La Conquerante
2011
Sea Of Heartbreak	Miss Crissy	Modeyra

2010–2001
2010
Maria Royal	High Heeled	Sarah Lynx
2009
Daryakana	Peinture Rare	Plumania
2008
Balladeuse	Tres Rapide	Dar Re Mi
2007
Anna Pavlova	Princesse Dansante	Darsha
2006
Montare	Lahudood	Alix Road
2005
Oiseau Rare	Kastoria	Guadalajara
2004
Samando	Russian Hill	Behkara
2003
Moon Search	Whortleberry	Ocean Silk
2002
Dance Routine	Trumbaka	Tigertail
2001
Moon Queen	Ranin	Street Shaana

2000-1991
2000
Mouramara	Beyond The Waves	Playact
1999
Fairy Queen	Daring Miss	Abyaan
1998
Lexa	Gazelle Royale	Bimbola
1997
Tulipa	Dame Kiri	Kassana
1996
Annaba	Whitewater Affair	Zafzala
1995
Russian Snows	Daraydala	Genovefa
1994
Dalara	Noble Rose	Sunrise Song
1993
Halesia	Rayseka	Lille Hammer
1992
Fabulous Hostess	Good To Dance	Spring
1991
Saganeca	Brooklyn's Dance	Wajd

1990-1989
1990
Madame Dubois	Spendomania	Echoes
1989
Passionaria	Robertet	Carmita

The Prix de Royallieu is a Group 1 flat horse race in France open to thoroughbred fillies and mares aged three years or older. It is run at Longchamp over a distance of 2,800 metres (about 1 mile and 6 furlongs), and it is scheduled to take place each year in late September or early October.

== History ==
The event is named after Royallieu, an area where the stables of Frédéric de Lagrange were located in the late 19th century. The original version was open to horses of either gender aged three or older. It was contested over 3,000 metres in late October.

The race was restricted to three-year-old fillies and cut to 2,600 metres in 1922. It was cancelled in 1939 and 1940 because of World War II. For the following two years it was run at Le Tremblay over 2,500 metres, and it resumed at Longchamp in 1943.

The Prix de Royallieu was opened to older fillies and mares in 1965. It was given Group 3 status in 1971, and was shortened to 2,500 metres in 1972.

The event was promoted to Group 2 level and moved to the Prix de l'Arc de Triomphe weekend in 1988. The latter race is traditionally held on the first Sunday of October. The race was run at Group 1 level for the first time in 2019, when the distance was increased from 2500 metres to 2800 metres.

== Records ==
Most successful horse since 1922 (2 wins):

- The Juliet Rose – 2016, 2017

Leading jockey since 1922 (6 wins):

- Gérald Mossé – Saganeca (1991), Dalara (1994), Mouramara (2000), Daryakana (2009), Maria Royal (2010), Frine (2014)
- Frankie Dettori – Annaba (1996), Tulipa (1997), Moon Queen (2001), Anna Pavlova (2007), Anapurna (2019), Loving Dream (2021)

Leading trainer since 1922 (8 wins):

- Alain de Royer-Dupré – Euliya (1984), Sharaniya (1986), Dalara (1994), Daryakana (2009), Maria Royal (2010), Dalkala (2012), Ebiyza (2013), Candarliya (2015)

Leading owner since 1922 (8 wins):

- HH Aga Khan IV – Euliya (1984), Sharaniya (1986), Dalara (1994), Mouramara (2000), Daryakana (2009), Dalkala (2012), Ebiyza (2013), Candarliya (2015)

== Winners since 1975 ==
Year	Winner	Age	Jockey	Trainer	Owner	Time
1975	Gramy	4	Maurice Philipperon	E. Chevalier du Fau	Pierre Ribes
1976	Paint the Town	3	Maurice Philipperon	John Fellows	Peggy Augustus	2:52.60
1977	Trillion	3	Alain Badel	François Mathet	Hunt / Stephenson
1978	Amazer	3	Yves Saint-Martin	Maurice Zilber	Nelson Bunker Hunt
1979	Sealy	3	Freddy Head	Criquette Head	Ghislaine Head
1980	Mariella	3	Philippe Paquet	François Boutin	Gerry Oldham	2:49.30
1981	Don't Sulk	3	Philippe Paquet	François Boutin	Stavros Niarchos
1982	Gipsy Road	3	Cash Asmussen	François Boutin	Peter Goulandris
1983	High Hawk	3	Willie Carson	John Dunlop	Sheikh Mohammed	2:39.90
1984	Euliya	3	Yves Saint-Martin	Alain de Royer-Dupré	HH Aga Khan IV	2:47.80
1985	Mersey	3	Éric Legrix	Patrick Biancone	Daniel Wildenstein	2:41.00
1986	Sharaniya	3	Yves Saint-Martin	Alain de Royer-Dupré	HH Aga Khan IV	2:40.40
1987	Her Highness	3	Richard Briard	Georges Bridgland	Georges Bridgland	2:46.30
1988	Summer Trip	3	Alfred Gibert	John Fellows	Robin Scully	2:41.60
1989	Passionaria	3	Cash Asmussen	John Hammond	D. M. Kendall	2:38.90
1990	Madame Dubois	3	Pat Eddery	Henry Cecil	Cliveden Stud	2:42.60
1991	Saganeca	3	Gérald Mossé	Antonio Spanu	Ecurie Matemy Farm	2:41.90
1992	Fabulous Hostess	4	Olivier Doleuze	Criquette Head	Jacques Wertheimer	2:53.80
1993	Halesia	4	Dominique Boeuf	Élie Lellouche	Enrique Sarasola	2:49.00
1994	Dalara	3	Gérald Mossé	Alain de Royer-Dupré	HH Aga Khan IV	2:42.20
1995	Russian Snows	3	Michael Kinane	John Oxx	Sheikh Mohammed	2:47.00
1996	Annaba	3	Frankie Dettori	John Gosden	Sheikh Mohammed	2:43.20
1997	Tulipa	4	Frankie Dettori	Saeed bin Suroor	Godolphin	2:39.40
1998	Lexa	4	Dominique Boeuf	Helena van Zuylen	Thierry van Zuylen	2:44.80
1999	Fairy Queen	3	Sylvain Guillot	Saeed bin Suroor	Godolphin	3:03.80
2000	Mouramara	3	Gérald Mossé	John Oxx	HH Aga Khan IV	2:37.50
2001	Moon Queen	3	Frankie Dettori	Jean-Claude Rouget	Joseph Allen	2:49.30
2002	Dance Routine	3	Christophe Soumillon	André Fabre	Khalid Abdullah	2:39.40
2003	Moon Search	4	Christophe Soumillon	André Fabre	Khalid Abdullah	2:48.60
2004	Samando	4	Stéphane Pasquier	François Doumen	Hans Wirth	2:39.40
2005	Oiseau Rare	3	Christophe Soumillon	André Fabre	Bethy Lagardère	2:40.30
2006	Montare	4	Olivier Peslier	Jonathan Pease	George Strawbridge	2:39.50
2007	Anna Pavlova	4	Frankie Dettori	Richard Fahey	Galaxy Racing	2:41.30
2008	Balladeuse	3	Olivier Peslier	André Fabre	Wertheimer et Frère	2:38.30
2009	Daryakana	3	Gérald Mossé	Alain de Royer-Dupré	HH Aga Khan IV	2:38.40
2010	Maria Royal	3	Gérald Mossé	Alain de Royer-Dupré	Slim Chiboub	2:49.60
2011	Sea of Heartbreak	4	Olivier Peslier	Roger Charlton	D. G. Hardisty B'stock	2:53.90
2012	Dalkala	3	Christophe Lemaire	Alain de Royer-Dupré	HH Aga Khan IV	2:57.04
2013	Ebiyza	3	Christophe Lemaire	Alain de Royer-Dupré	HH Aga Khan IV	2:44.17
2014	Frine	4	Gérald Mossé	Carlos Laffon-Parias	19th Duke of Alburquerque	2:37.29
2015	Candarliya	3	Christophe Soumillon	Alain de Royer-Dupré	HH Aga Khan IV	2:37.05
2016	The Juliet Rose (Note: The 2016 & 2017 runnings took place at Chantilly while Longchamp was closed for redevelopment)	3	Stéphane Pasquier	Nicolas Clement	Mayfair / Equifrance	2:31.14
2017	The Juliet Rose	4	Stéphane Pasquier	Nicolas Clement	Mayfair / Equifrance	2:35.55
2018	Princess Yaiza	3	Andrea Atzeni	Gavin Cromwell	Lindsay Laroche	2:43.87
2019	Anapurna	3	Frankie Dettori	John Gosden	Meon Valley Stud	3:10.98
2020	Wonderful Tonight	3	Tony Piccone	David Menuisier	Christopher Wright	3:11.22
2021	Loving Dream	3	Frankie Dettori	John & Thady Gosden	Lordship Stud	3:09.67
2022	Sea La Rosa	4	Tom Marquand	William Haggas	Sunderland Holding Inc	3:13.76
2023	Sea Silk Road	4	Aurelien Lemaitre	William Haggas	Sunderland Holding Inc	2:57.06
2024	Grateful	3	Christophe Soumillon	Aidan O'Brien	Magnier / Tabor / Smith	3:03.43
2025	Consent	3	Luke Morris	Sir Mark Prescott	Denford Stud	3:05.15
2026	Fairy Glen	5	Mickael Barzalona	Simon & Ed Crisford	Hamdan bin Mohammed Al Maktoum	2.59.16

== Earlier winners ==
- 1922: Chantepie
- 1923: Pomare
- 1924: Tetratela
- 1925: Frisette
- 1926: Gitane
- 1927: Buanderie
- 1928: L'Olivete
- 1929: Nitakrit
- 1930: Aude
- 1931: Brunhild
- 1932: Foxarella
- 1933: Armoise
- 1934: Samee
- 1935: Medea
- 1936: Miraflore
- 1937: Kiss Curl
- 1938: Queen
- 1939–40: no race
- 1941: Veronique
- 1942: Fidgette
- 1943: Pistole
- 1944–45: no race
- 1946: Campanelle
- 1947: Apostille
- 1948: Frenaux
- 1949:
- 1950: Polaire
- 1951: Monrovia
- 1952: Lovely Princess
- 1953: Donica
- 1954: Rowena
- 1955: Vallee du Gave
- 1956:
- 1957: Tehmany
- 1958: Dalaba
- 1959: Persepolis
- 1960: Pasquinade
- 1961: Bobette
- 1962: L'X
- 1963: Monique
- 1964:
- 1965: Cassette
- 1966: Andrusa
- 1967: Monatrea
- 1968: Silana
- 1969: Riverside
- 1970: Prime Abord
- 1971: Example
- 1972: Guillotina
- 1973: Sybarite
- 1974: Ambrellita

== See also ==
- List of French flat horse races
