= Minster Son =

British-bred Thoroughbred racehorse

- Sire: Niniski
- Grandsire: Nijinsky
- Dam: Honey Bridge
- Damsire: Crepello
- Sex: Stallion
- Foaled: 1985
- Died: 30 August 2006 (aged 20–21)
- Country: Ireland
- Colour: Chestnut
- Breeder: Willie Carson
- Owner: Lady Beaverbrook
- Trainer: Dick Hern; Neil Graham
- Record: 8:5-1-0

Major wins
- Newmarket Stakes (1988); Predominate Stakes (1988); Gordon Stakes (1988); St. Leger Stakes (1988)

Minster Son (1985 – 30 August 2006) was a British Thoroughbred racehorse and sire. In a career which lasted from late summer 1987 until September 1988, he ran eight times and won five races. He recorded his most important success when winning the Classic St. Leger Stakes as a three-year-old in 1988, ridden by his breeder, Willie Carson. In the same year in which he also won the Newmarket Stakes, the Predominate Stakes and the Gordon Stakes. He was retired to stud following his St Leger victory.

== Background ==
Minster Son was a strongly-built chestnut horse with a white blaze bred by the leading jockey Willie Carson who rode him in all of his races. He was sired by the American-bred stallion Niniski, who won the Irish St. Leger and the Prix Royal-Oak in 1979 before going on to sire many good staying horses including Petoski, Hernando (Prix du Jockey Club) and Lomitas (Preis von Europa). His dam, Honey Bridge, was a member of Thoroughbred family 14-a, which also produced notable horses including Tetratema and Polynesian. Before his racing career began, Minster Son entered the ownership of Lady Beaverbrook and was sent into training with Major Dick Hern at West Ilsley in Berkshire.

== Racing career ==
=== 1987: two-year-old season ===
Minster Son made his first appearance in a maiden race at Newbury Racecourse in which he defeated his stable companion Unfuwain and twenty-five others. He was beaten in his two remaining starts in 1987.

=== 1988: three-year-old season ===
Minster Son began his three-year-old season in the Newmarket Stakes over ten furlongs in April. Carson rode the colt to a one length victory over the favourite Red Glow. Two weeks later, Red Glow won the Dante Stakes at York. Minster Son was sent to Goodwood for the Predominate Stakes on 18 May, a recognised trial race for The Derby. He took the lead in the straight and won by one and a half lengths from Sheriff's Star.

At Epsom on 1 June, Minster Son started the 6/1 third favourite for the Derby behind Red Glow and Unfuwain. Carson chose to ride the horse he had bred in preference to the more fancied Unfuwain and the 2000 Guineas runner-up Charmer. Minster Son was never in contention for the lead and finished eighth of the fourteen runners behind Kahyasi. It was to be his only defeat of the season. In July, Minster Son returned to Goodwood for the Gordon Stakes and won by two lengths from Assatis to establish himself as major contender for the St Leger.

Shortly after Minster Son's win in the Gordon Stakes, Hern underwent heart surgery, and the colt's training was taken over by his assistant Neil Graham. At Doncaster Racecourse on 10 September, Minster Son started third favourite for the St Leger behind the filly Diminuendo who had won The Oaks, Irish Oaks and Yorkshire Oaks. Sheriff's Star was made second favourite after winning the King Edward VII Stakes and the Great Voltigeur Stakes. Carson kept his horse towards the front of the field before sending him into the lead three furlongs from the finish, and Diminuendo emerged as his only serious challenger. Minster Son "stayed on gamely" to beat the filly by a length, with Sheriff's Star finishing eight lengths further back in third. Willie Carson became the first man to win a Classic on a horse he had bred himself. After the race, Carson explained that Minster Son's performance as the colt had been affected by a back injury in his previous two starts. He also expressed the hope the colt would be better as a four-year-old.

Minster Son remained in training in 1989 but in March Lady Beaverbrook announced that he would be retired to stud without racing again.

== Stud career ==
Minster Son stood as a stallion at the Acrum Lodge Stud near Bishop Auckland in County Durham from his retirement until his death on 30 August 2006. He had no success as a sire of flat racers, but had more success as a National Hunt stallion. The best of his progeny was probably the steeplechaser Rambling Minster who started second favourite for the 2009 Grand National after winning the Blue Square Gold Cup at Haydock.

== Pedigree ==
Pedigree of Minster Son, chestnut stallion, 1985
Sire Niniski (USA) 1976	Nijinsky (CAN); 1967	Northern Dancer	Nearctic
Sire Niniski (USA) 1976	Nijinsky (CAN); 1967	Northern Dancer	Natalma
Sire Niniski (USA) 1976	Nijinsky (CAN); 1967	Flaming Page	Bull Page
Sire Niniski (USA) 1976	Nijinsky (CAN); 1967	Flaming Page	Flaring Top
Sire Niniski (USA) 1976	Virginia Hills (USA); 1971	Tom Rolfe	Ribot
Sire Niniski (USA) 1976	Virginia Hills (USA); 1971	Tom Rolfe	Pocahontas
Sire Niniski (USA) 1976	Virginia Hills (USA); 1971	Ridin' Easy	Ridan
Sire Niniski (USA) 1976	Virginia Hills (USA); 1971	Ridin' Easy	Easy Eight
Dam Honey Bridge (GB) 1975	Crepello (GB); 1954	Donatello	Blenheim
Dam Honey Bridge (GB) 1975	Crepello (GB); 1954	Donatello	Delleana
Dam Honey Bridge (GB) 1975	Crepello (GB); 1954	Crepuscule	Mieuxce
Dam Honey Bridge (GB) 1975	Crepello (GB); 1954	Crepuscule	Red Sunset
Dam Honey Bridge (GB) 1975	Mockbridge (GB); 1969	Bleep-Bleep	Hard Sauce
Dam Honey Bridge (GB) 1975	Mockbridge (GB); 1969	Bleep-Bleep	Curtsey
Dam Honey Bridge (GB) 1975	Mockbridge (GB); 1969	Greenbridge	Fairway
Dam Honey Bridge (GB) 1975	Mockbridge (GB); 1969	Greenbridge	Buckeye (Family:14-a)
