= Lingfield Oaks Trial =

Flat horse race in Britain

Oaks Trial Stakes
- Class: Listed
- Location: Lingfield Park; Lingfield, England
- Race type: Flat / Thoroughbred
- Sponsor: William Hill
- Website: Lingfield Park

Race information
- Distance: 1m 3f 133y (2,334m)
- Surface: Turf
- Track: Left-handed
- Qualification: Three-year-old fillies
- Weight: 9 st 2lb Penalties; 5 lb for Group winners * 3 lb for Listed winners * * after 31 August 2023
- Purse: £60,000 (2024); 1st: £34,488

Lingfield Oaks Trial
2026
Cameo	Prizeland	Bloom

Previous years
2025
Giselle	Harpsichord	Love Talk
2024
You Got To Me	Rubies Are Red	Danielle
2023
Eternal Hope	Be Happy	Ferrari Queen
2022
Rogue Millennium	Mystic Wells	Makinmedoit
2021
Sherbet Lemon	Save A Forest	Ocean Road

2020-2011
2020
Miss Yoda	Golden Lips	West End Girl
2019
Anapurna	Tauteke	King Power
2018
Perfect Clarity	Cecchini	Flattering
2017
Hertford Dancer	Pocketfullofdreams	The Sky Is Blazing
2016
Seventh Heaven	Architecture	Mountain Bell
2015
Toujours L'amour	Bellajeu	Wedding Vow
2014
Honor Bound	Criteria	Momentus
2013
Secret Gesture	Miss You Too	Whippy Cream
2012
Vow	Colima	Estrela
2011
Zain Al Boldan	Field Of Miracles	Date With Destiny

2010-2001
2010
Dyna Waltz	Timepiece	Ceilidh House
2009
Midday	July Jasmine	Tottie
2008
Miracle Seeker	Look Here	Presbyterian Nun
2007
Kayah	Brisk Breeze	Folk Opera
2006
Sindirana	Fusili	Summer's Eve
2005
Cassydora	Seven Magicians	Ayam Zaman
2004
Baraka	Bowstring	Rio De Jumeirah
2003
Santa Sophia	Midsummer	Heavenly Bay
2002
Birdie	Barzah	Mubkera
2001
Double Crossed	Silver Grey Lady	Charmer Venture

2000-1991
2000
Film Script	Dollar Bird	Dream Quest
1999
Ramruma	Credit-A-Plenty	Noushkey
1998
Bristol Channel	Trigger Happy	Virtuous
1997
Crown Of Light	Book At Bedtime	Ukraine Venture
1996
Lady Carla	Flame Valley	Moody's Cat
1995
Asterita	Bunting	Kshessinskaya
1994
Munnaya	Las Flores	Brentwood
1993
Oakmead	Talented	Dancing Prize
1992
User Friendly	Niodini	Venturina
1991
Ausherra	Gai Bulga	Subtle Change

1990-1983
1990
Rafha	Knight's Baroness	Idle Chat
1989
Aliysa	Wrapping	Chouchounova
1988
Bahamian	Shuddabot	Triste Oeil
1987
Port Helene	Iosifa	Queen Midas
1986
Mill On the Floss	Laughter	Singletta
1985
Kiliniski	Grace Note	Little Deep Water
1984
Out of Shot	Spinelle	Media Luna
1983
Give Thanks	Cormorant Wood	Hardihostess

The Oaks Trial Stakes is a Listed flat horse race in Great Britain open to three-year-old fillies. It is run over a distance of 1 mile, 3 furlongs and 133 yards (2,334 metres) at Lingfield Park in May.

== History ==
The event serves as a trial for the Epsom Oaks. Prior to World War II, it was called the Oaks Trial Plate. It became the Oaks Trial Stakes after the war.

The left-handed track at Lingfield Park is similar to that at Epsom. It has an undulating, cambered terrain with a sharp downhill turn into the home straight.

The Oaks Trial Stakes was formerly contested over 1 mile and 4 furlongs. It held Group 3 status from 1971 to 1985, and was relegated to Listed level in 1986. It was cut to its present distance in 1990.

Several contenders have subsequently won the Oaks. The most recent was Anapurna, the winner in 2019.

== Records ==
Leading jockeys (6 wins):

- Harry Carr – Angelola (1948), Nectarine (1953), Angel Bright (1954), Mirnaya (1959), Impudent (1961), Amicable (1963)
- Pat Eddery – Suni (1978), Out of Shot (1984), Bahamian (1988), Asterita (1995), Lady Carla (1996), Santa Sophia (2003)

Leading trainer (8 wins):

- Cecil Boyd-Rochfort – Look Alive (1933), Solpax (1947), Angelola (1948), Nectarine (1953), Angel Bright (1954), Mirnaya (1959), Impudent (1961), Amicable (1963)

== Winners ==
Year	Winner	Jockey	Trainer	Time
1933	Look Alive	Gordon Richards	Cecil Boyd-Rochfort	2:37.80
1934	Shining Cloud	Freddie Fox	Joseph Lawson	2:42.60
1935	Milldoria	Jack Sirett	Fred Templeman	2:40.80
1936	Miss Windsor	Eph Smith	Marcus Marsh	2:41.40
1937	Ruby Red	Jack Sirett	Vic Smyth	3:03.20
1938	Night Bird	Tommy Lowrey	Geoffrey Barling	2:40.60
1939	Foxcraft	Gordon Richards	Fred Darling
	no race 1940–45
1946	Iona	Eph Smith	Jack Jarvis	2:40.20
1947	Solpax	Michael Beary	Cecil Boyd-Rochfort	2:42.80
1948	Angelola	Harry Carr	Cecil Boyd-Rochfort	2:39.80
1949	Squall	Tommy Gosling	Frank Butters	2:37.20
1950	Stella Polaris	Edgar Britt	Marcus Marsh	2:50.00
1951	Chinese Cracker	Scobie Breasley	Herbert Blagrave	2:38.00
1952	Zabara	Ken Gethin	Vic Smyth	2:39.40
1953	Nectarine	Harry Carr	Cecil Boyd-Rochfort	2:45.40
1954	Angel Bright	Harry Carr	Cecil Boyd-Rochfort	2:47.40
1955	Arc Royal	Manny Mercer	George Colling	2:47.20
1956	No Pretender	Willie Snaith	Humphrey Cottrill	2:41.80
1957	Crotchet	Willie Snaith	Humphrey Cottrill	2:40.60
1958	None Nicer	Stan Clayton	Dick Hern	2:42.60
1959	Mirnaya	Harry Carr	Cecil Boyd-Rochfort	2:44.80
1960	Running Blue	Eddie Larkin	Jack Jarvis	2:50.20
1961	Impudent	Harry Carr	Cecil Boyd-Rochfort	2:44.80
1962	Nortia	Joe Mercer	Dick Hern	2:41.60
1963	Amicable	Harry Carr	Cecil Boyd-Rochfort	2:46.40
1964	Beaufront	Doug Smith	Jack Watts	2:51.00
1965	Quita II	Duncan Keith	Walter Nightingall	2:39.40
1966	Varinia	Stan Clayton	Noel Murless	2:46.40
1967	Javata	Duncan Keith	Bill Wightman	2:44.60
1968	Our Ruby	Jimmy Lindley	Bill Watts	3:02.00
1969	Sleeping Partner	John Gorton	Doug Smith	2:48.60
1970	Pulchra	Brian Jago	Jack Sirett	2:56.10
1971	Maina	Lester Piggott	Noel Murless	2:39.00
1972	Ginevra	Tony Murray	Ryan Price	2:49.50
1973	Syrona	Brian Taylor	Harry Wragg	2:46.30
1974	Riboreen	Brian Taylor	John Winter	2:39.81
1975	Juliette Marny	Lester Piggott	Jeremy Tree	2:45.69
1976	Heaven Knows	Eric Eldin	Ron Smyth	2:40.52
1977	Lucent	Brian Taylor	Ryan Price	2:48.39
1978	Suni	Pat Eddery	Peter Walwyn	2:54.84
1979	Reprocolor	Greville Starkey	Michael Stoute	Not taken
1980	Gift Wrapped	Philip Robinson	Frankie Durr	2:38.19
1981	Leap Lively	John Matthias	Ian Balding	2:38.73
1982	Tants	Lester Piggott	Henry Cecil	2:35.14
1983	Give Thanks	Declan Gillespie	Jim Bolger	2:48.92
1984	Out of Shot	Pat Eddery	John Dunlop	2:38.04
1985	Kiliniski	Brian Rouse	John Dunlop	2:38.51
1986	Mill on the Floss	Steve Cauthen	Henry Cecil	2:41.98
1987	Port Helene	Willie Carson	Dick Hern	2:34.88
1988	Bahamian	Pat Eddery	Jeremy Tree	2:39.67
1989	Aliysa	Walter Swinburn	Michael Stoute	2:32.06
1990	Rafha	Steve Cauthen	Henry Cecil	2:28.97
1991	Ausherra	Alan Munro	Paul Cole	2:29.92
1992	User Friendly	George Duffield	Clive Brittain	2:30.27
1993	Oakmead	John Reid	Peter Chapple-Hyam	2:28.13
1994	Munnaya	Walter Swinburn	Michael Stoute	2:33.95
1995	Asterita	Pat Eddery	Richard Hannon Sr.	2:28.54
1996	Lady Carla	Pat Eddery	Henry Cecil	2:25.03
1997	Crown of Light	Olivier Peslier	Michael Stoute	2:35.72
1998	Bristol Channel	Darryll Holland	Barry Hills	2:29.18
1999	Ramruma	Kieren Fallon	Henry Cecil	2:31.48
2000	Film Script	Richard Hughes	Roger Charlton	2:32.36
2001	Double Crossed	Richard Quinn	Henry Cecil	2:31.63
2002	Birdie	Richard Quinn	Michael Bell	2:30.38
2003	Santa Sophia	Pat Eddery	John Dunlop	2:33.84
2004	Baraka	Jamie Spencer	Aidan O'Brien	2:41.68
2005	Cassydora	Seb Sanders	John Dunlop	2:30.21
2006	Sindirana	Christophe Soumillon	Sir Michael Stoute	2:28.27
2007	Kayah	Richard Hughes	Ralph Beckett	2:31.52
2008	Miracle Seeker	Adam Kirby	Clive Cox	2:28.99
2009	Midday	Tom Queally	Henry Cecil	2:30.49
2010	Dyna Waltz	Ryan Moore	John Gosden	2:32.46
2011	Zain Al Boldan	Sam Hitchcott	Mick Channon	2:29.66
2012 (Note: The 2012 & 2023 runnings took place on Lingfield's all-weather track over 1 mile and 4 furlongs)	Vow	Johnny Murtagh	William Haggas	2:30.56
2013	Secret Gesture	Jim Crowley	Ralph Beckett	2:33.82
2014	Honor Bound	Joe Fanning	Ralph Beckett	2:32.42
2015	Toujours L'Amour	Harry Bentley	William Haggas	2:37.53
2016	Seventh Heaven	Ryan Moore	Aidan O'Brien	2:33.36
2017	Hertford Dancer	Frankie Dettori	John Gosden	2:32.07
2018	Perfect Clarity	Adam Kirby	Clive Cox	2:28.32
2019	Anapurna	Frankie Dettori	John Gosden	2:31.77
2020 (Note: The 2020 race was run in June, due to the COVID-19 pandemic in the United Kingdom)	Miss Yoda	Robert Havlin	John Gosden	2:27.19
2021	Sherbet Lemon	Paul Mulrennan	Archie Watson	2:40.99
2022	Rogue Millennium	Jack Mitchell	Tom Clover	2:28.80
2023 (Note: The 2012 & 2023 runnings took place on Lingfield's all-weather track over 1 mile and 4 furlongs)	Eternal Hope	William Buick	Charlie Appleby	2:30.89
2024	You Got To Me	Hector Crouch	Ralph Beckett	2:26.25
2025	Giselle	Ryan Moore	Aidan O'Brien	2:31.16
2026	Cameo	Ryan Moore	Aidan O'Brien	2:28:80

== See also ==
- Horse racing in Great Britain
- List of British flat horse races
