= One in a Million (horse) =

Irish-bred Thoroughbred racehorse (1976–1992)

- Sire: Rarity
- Grandsire: Hethersett
- Dam: Singe
- Damsire: Tudor Music
- Sex: Mare
- Foaled: 25 April 1976
- Country: United Kingdom
- Colour: Bay
- Breeder: Mount Coote Waverton Stud
- Owner: Helena Springfield Ltd
- Trainer: Henry Cecil
- Record: 6: 5-0-0

Major wins
- Blue Seal Stakes (1978); Houghton Stakes (1978); Nell Gwyn Stakes (1979); 1000 Guineas (1979); Coronation Stakes (1979)

Awards
- Top-rated British three-year-old filly (1979); Timeform rating: 116p (1978), 125 (1979)
- Last updated on 5 March 2025

One in a Million (25 April 1976 – 1992) was an Irish-bred, British-trained Thoroughbred racehorse and broodmare best known for winning the classic 1000 Guineas in 1979. She won both her races as a two-year-old in good style and began her three-year-old season with a five length win in the Nell Gwyn Stakes. She won the 1000 Guineas as a short-priced favourite and was awarded victory in the Coronation Stakes on the disqualification of Buz Kashi. She lost her unbeaten record when finishing unplaced in the July Cup and never raced again. After being retired from racing she had considerable success as a broodmare. She died in 1992.

== Background ==
One in a Million was a small, lightly-built bay filly with a faint white star bred in Ireland by the County Limerick-based Mount Coote Stud. She was the only classic winner sired by Rarity who won two running of the Desmond Stakes but produced his best performance when beaten a short head by Brigadier Gerard in the Champion Stakes. Her dam Singe never raced but came from a good family, being a half sister to leading stallion Deep Run and a granddaughter of the mare Mitrailleuse whose other descendants included Full Dress, Commanche Run and Swiftfoot (Irish Oaks).

As a yearling, the filly was sent to the Newmarket Houghton sales in October 1977 and was bought for 18,500 guineas by the bloodstock agent Richard Galpin, on behalf of Egon Weinfeld, who raced her in the black and white colours of his company Helena Springfield Ltd. The filly was sent into training with Henry Cecil in Newmarket, Suffolk and was ridden in her races by Joe Mercer.

== Racing career ==
=== 1978: two-year-old season ===
One in a Million made her racecourse debut against nine opponents in the Listed Blue Seal Stakes over six furlongs at Ascot Racecourse in September. She was made favourite for the race after reports that she had performed impressively in a training gallop against her stable companions Formulate and Odeon who had finished first and second in the Hoover Fillies' Mile. After tracking the leaders until the final furlong, One in a Million produced what Timeform described as an "electrifying burst" of acceleration to take the lead and win easily by one and a half lengths from Lyric Dance. In October, the filly was matched against colts as she carried top weight in the Houghton Stakes over seven furlong at Newmarket Racecourse. She took the lead from the start, went clear of the field in the last quarter-mile and won easily by four lengths from Milford, despite being eased down by Mercer in the closing stages. As a result of her win she was made one of the favourites for the following year's 1000 Guineas although Cecil was cautious, describing her as a "rather fragile" filly, who "may not winter well".

=== 1979: three-year-old season ===
On her three-year-old debut, One in a Million was matched against the Cheveley Park Stakes winner Devon Ditty in the Group Three Nell Gwyn Stakes over seven furlongs at Newmarket. The race was a trial race for the 1000 Guineas and One in a Million was made the 8/13 favourite. She was restrained by Mercer until half way but then accelerated into the lead and went clear of the field to win by five lengths from Devon Ditty. Three weeks later One in a Million started even money favourite against seventeen opponents for the 167th running of the 1000 Guineas over Newmarket's Rowley Mile course. Her main rivals appeared to be Pitasia (Prix Robert Papin, Critérium des Pouliches), Topsy (Fred Darling Stakes) and Lyric Dance (Free Handicap). She was always going well and settled the race with a burst of acceleration three furlongs from the finish which took her clear of the field. In the final strides she appeared to be tiring slightly but she was never seriously challenged and won by one and a half lengths and a head from the outsiders Abbeydale and Yanuka.

As One in a Million seemed most unlikely to stay further than a mile she was withdrawn from the one and a half-mile Oaks Stakes and next appeared in the Coronation Stakes (then a Group Two race) at Royal Ascot. She started the 10/11 favourite in a field which included Abbeydale, Yanuka, Topsy and Formulate. She took the lead early in the straight and looked likely to win easily but in the final furlong she was overtaken by the outsider Buz Kashi and was beaten one and a half lengths into second place. She was awarded the race after an inquiry by the racecourse stewards, who disqualified Buz Kashi for causing interference to Lightning Record two furlongs from the finish. For her next race, One in a Million was brought back in distance to race against specialist sprinters in the July Cup over six furlongs at Newmarket. She never looked likely to win and was eased down by Mercer in the closing stages, finishing unplaced behind Thatching.

== Assessment ==
In 1978, the independent Timeform organisation gave One in a Million a rating of 116p, sixteen pounds below their top-rated two-year-old filly Sigy. The "p" indicated that the filly was likely to make more than usual improvement. In the inaugural International Classification, she was rated eight pounds below Sigy and four pounds below the leading British-trained fillies Devon Ditty and Formulate. In the following year she was rated 125 by Timeform, eight pounds below the top-rated three-year-old filly Three Troikas. She was the top-rated British-trained filly in the International Classification, fourteen pounds below Three Troikas.

In their book, A Century of Champions, based on the Timeform rating system, John Randall and Tony Morris rated One in a Million an "average" winner of the 1000 Guineas.

== Breeding record ==
One in a Million was retired from racing to become a broodmare at her owner's Meon Valley Stud in Hampshire. She produced eight foals between 1981 and 1990:

- Black Spout (bay colt, foaled in 1981, sired by Nonoalco), failed to win in 35 races
- Anansi (bay colt, 1982, by Kris), unplaced in only race
- Someone Special (GB), bay filly, foaled 1 January 1983, by Habitat (USA), won one race, dam of One So Wonderful
- Milligram (GB), chestnut filly, foaled 3 April 1984, by Mill Reef, won Coronation Stakes, Queen Elizabeth II Stakes
- One From Above (bay colt, 1985, by Shirley Heights), failed to win in three races
- Millionaires Row (bay colt, 1987, by Niniski), won two races
- Admiralty (bay colt, 1989, by Slip Anchor), unraced
- Number One Spot (bay filly, 1990, by Reference Point), won one race

One in a Million died at the Meon Valley Stud in 1992.

== Pedigree ==
Pedigree of One in a Million (IRE), bay mare, 1976
Sire Rarity (GB) 1967	Hethersett (GB); 1959	Hugh Lupus	Djebel
Sire Rarity (GB) 1967	Hethersett (GB); 1959	Hugh Lupus	Sakountala
Sire Rarity (GB) 1967	Hethersett (GB); 1959	Bride Elect	Big Game
Sire Rarity (GB) 1967	Hethersett (GB); 1959	Bride Elect	Netherton Maid
Sire Rarity (GB) 1967	Who Can Tell (GB); 1958	Worden	Wild Risk
Sire Rarity (GB) 1967	Who Can Tell (GB); 1958	Worden	Sans Tares
Sire Rarity (GB) 1967	Who Can Tell (GB); 1958	Javotte	Whirlaway
Sire Rarity (GB) 1967	Who Can Tell (GB); 1958	Javotte	Galatea
Dam Singe (IRE) 1972	Tudor Music (GB); 1966	Tudor Melody	Tudor Minstrel
Dam Singe (IRE) 1972	Tudor Music (GB); 1966	Tudor Melody	Matelda
Dam Singe (IRE) 1972	Tudor Music (GB); 1966	Fran	Acropolis
Dam Singe (IRE) 1972	Tudor Music (GB); 1966	Fran	Madrilene
Dam Singe (IRE) 1972	Trial By Fire (FR); 1958	Court Martial	Fair Trial
Dam Singe (IRE) 1972	Trial By Fire (FR); 1958	Court Martial	Instantaneous
Dam Singe (IRE) 1972	Trial By Fire (FR); 1958	Mitrailleuse	Mieuxce
Dam Singe (IRE) 1972	Trial By Fire (FR); 1958	Mitrailleuse	French Kin (Family: 16-h)
