= Niniski =

American-bred Thoroughbred racehorse

- Racing silks of Lady Beaverbrook
- Sire: Nijinsky
- Grandsire: Northern Dancer
- Dam: Virginia Hills
- Damsire: Tom Rolfe
- Sex: Stallion
- Foaled: 15 February 1976
- Country: United States
- Colour: Bay
- Breeder: Caper Hill Farm
- Owner: Lady Beaverbrook
- Trainer: Dick Hern
- Record: 14:6-3-1

Major wins
- Geoffrey Freer Stakes (1979); Irish St. Leger (1979); Prix Royal-Oak (1979); John Porter Stakes (1980); Ormonde Stakes (1980)

Awards
- Timeform rating "p" (1978), 125 (1979), 118 (1980)

Niniski (15 February 1976 – November 1998) was an American-bred, British-trained Thoroughbred racehorse and sire. In a racing career which lasted from October 1978 until October 1980, he ran fourteen times and won six races. After showing some promise in his early races he emerged as a top-class stayer in the autumn on 1979, winning the Geoffrey Freer Stakes, Irish St. Leger and Prix Royal-Oak. In the spring of 1981 he won the John Porter Stakes and the Ormonde Stakes but was beaten in his three remaining races. He was retired to stud where he became a very successful breeding stallion.

== Background ==
Niniski was a bay horse with a white blaze and three white socks, bred in Kentucky by Caper Hill Farm Inc. Niniski was sired by Nijinsky, the Canadian-bred winner of the English Triple Crown in 1970 who went on to become an important breeding stallion, siring horses such as Ferdinand, Lammtarra, Sky Classic and Shahrastani. Niniski's dam Virginia Hills was a granddaughter of the Fashion Stakes winner Ridin' Easy, herself a descendant of the Prix de l'Arc de Triomphe winner Pearl Cap, making her a distant relative of Pearl Diver, Belmez, Lypharita (Prix de Diane), Fine Pearl (Prix de Diane) and Yelapa (Grand Critérium).

As a yearling the colt was sent to the sales at Saratoga and bought by representatives of Lady Beaverbrook for $90,000. Lady Beaverbrook was considered an eccentric character who gave most of her horses names consisting of one word with seven letters (Bustino, Terimon, Boldboy, Niniski, Mystiko, Petoski), as this was the most common form for Derby winners. The colt was sent to Europe where he was trained by Dick Hern at West Ilsley in Berkshire.

== Racing career ==
=== 1978: two-year-old season ===
Shortly after his arrival in Europe, Niniski contracted pneumonia and almost died. He was not seriously trained as a two-year-old and did not race until October. He made his only appearance of 1978 in a six furlong maiden race at Newbury Racecourse in which he finished twelfth of the twenty-three runners behind Martial Arts.

=== 1979: three-year-old season ===
Niniski began his second season by recording his first success against a large field in a maiden race over one mile at Newmarket Racecourse. In his next race, he ran in the Glasgow Stakes over ten and a half furlongs at York in May in which he was beaten a head by the Peter Walwyn-trained New Berry. On 6 June, Ninisiki started an 80/1 outsider for the 200th running of the Derby Stakes over one and a half miles at Epsom Downs Racecourse and finished ninth of the twenty-three runners behind his stablemate Troy. In his next appearance, Niniski finished second by three quarters of a length to More Light, another Hern trainee, in the Group Three Gordon Stakes over one and a half miles at Goodwood.

Niniski won five of his next six races. In August he was moved up in distance and tried against older horses for the first time in the Group Two Geoffrey Freer Stakes over thirteen and a half furlongs at Newbury. Ridden by Willie Carson, he raced towards the back of the seven runner field before making steady progress in the straight. He took the lead approaching the final furlong and drew away in the closing stages to win by three lengths from the four-year-old M-Lolshan, the winner of the Irish St. Leger and Grosser Preis von Baden. At Doncaster Racecourse in September, Niniski started co-favourite for the 203rd running of the St Leger Stakes. Ridden again by Carson, he took the lead early in the straight but tired in the closing stages and finished third behind the French colts Son of Love and Soleil Noir. On 13 October, Niniski was sent to the Curragh Racecourse to contest the Irish St. Leger. Starting the 11/10 favourite, he drew away from his opponents in the final quarter mile to win by ten lengths from Torus. The independent Timeform organisation commented that "there can seldom have been a more decisive winner". Two weeks later Niniski started 7/5 favourite for the Prix Royal Oak, France's equivalent of the St Leger, run over 3100 metres at Longchamp Racecourse. The 1979 edition of the race was the first to be open to older horses, having previously being restricted to three-year-olds. Niniski appeared to be struggling at half way but rallied and turned into the straight in third place. He took the lead inside the last 400 metres and held on to win by one and a half lengths from the filly Anifa (later to win the Turf Classic). Niniski became the first foreign-trained horse to win the race since 1962 and the first to complete the Irish St. Leger/ Prix Royal Oak double.

=== 1980: four-year-old season ===
On his four-year-old debut, Niniski was brought back in distance for the John Porter Stakes over one and a half miles at Newbury in April and started at odds of 2/1. He looked beaten when boxed in on the rail approaching the last quarter mile and when Carson had to switch to the outside of the field to obtain a clear run he was eight lengths behind the leaders. Niniski produced an unexpected burst of acceleration, taking the lead inside the final furlong and winning by three lengths from Morse Code. In the Ormonde Stakes at Chester Racecourse a month later, he was made the 4/7 favourite but was less impressive, winning narrowly from Two of Diamonds and Son Fils. At Epsom in June, Niniski started favourite for the Group One Coronation Cup, but after being held up by Carson in the early stages he was never able to get to the leader Sea Chimes and finished second, beaten two and a half lengths. Timeform commented that he appeared to be uncomfortable on the firm ground.

Niniski did not reappear until the Prix de l'Arc de Triomphe at Longchamp on 5 October. Ridden by Joe Mercer he started at odds of 21/1 and finished thirteenth of the twenty runners behind Detroit. On his final appearance, Niniski started the 4/1 third favourite as he attempted to repeat his 1979 success in the Prix Royal Oak. He finished sixth of the thirteen runners, five length behind the winner Gold River.

== Assessment ==
In 1978 the independent Timeform organisation did not give Niniski a rating, but awarded him a "p", indicating that he was likely to make more than usual improvement, commenting that he would "do better over middle distances at 3 yrs". In the following year he was rated 125 by Timeform, twelve pounds behind Troy. In the official International Classification he was also rated twelve pounds behind Troy, making him the sixth-best British-trained colt of his generation. In 1980, Niniski was rated 118 by Timeform. Dick Hern said that Niniski was "as game and genuine as any horse I ever handled. He was also very sound and easy to train".

== Stud record ==
Niniski was retired from racing at the end of the 1980 season and began his career as a breeding stallion at the Lanwades Stud at Newmarket, standing at a fee of £2,500. He made an immediate impact at stud, siring the champion two-year-old Kala Dancer and the King George VI and Queen Elizabeth Stakes winner Petoski in his first crop of foals and was the leading first-season sire in 1984. His other progeny included Hernando, Minster Son, Caitano (Premio Presidente della Repubblica, Aral-Pokal), Sapience (Ebor Handicap), Assessor, San Sebastian and the multiple Group One winner Lomitas (sire of Danedream).

Niniski was euthanised in 1998. Kirsten Rausing, the owner of the Lanwades stud said: "It is entirely to Niniski that I owe the success of Lanwades Stud. I will be forever grateful to him".

== Pedigree ==
Pedigree of Niniski (USA), bay stallion, 1976
Sire Nijinsky (CAN) 1967	Northern Dancer (CAN); 1961	Nearctic	Nearco
Sire Nijinsky (CAN) 1967	Northern Dancer (CAN); 1961	Nearctic	Lady Angela
Sire Nijinsky (CAN) 1967	Northern Dancer (CAN); 1961	Natalma	Native Dancer
Sire Nijinsky (CAN) 1967	Northern Dancer (CAN); 1961	Natalma	Almahmoud
Sire Nijinsky (CAN) 1967	Flaming Page (CAN); 1959	Bull Page	Bull Lea
Sire Nijinsky (CAN) 1967	Flaming Page (CAN); 1959	Bull Page	Our Page
Sire Nijinsky (CAN) 1967	Flaming Page (CAN); 1959	Flaring Top	Menow
Sire Nijinsky (CAN) 1967	Flaming Page (CAN); 1959	Flaring Top	Flaming Top
Dam Virginia Hills (USA) 1971	Tom Rolfe (USA); 1962	Ribot	Tenerani
Dam Virginia Hills (USA) 1971	Tom Rolfe (USA); 1962	Ribot	Romanella
Dam Virginia Hills (USA) 1971	Tom Rolfe (USA); 1962	Pocahontas	Roman
Dam Virginia Hills (USA) 1971	Tom Rolfe (USA); 1962	Pocahontas	How
Dam Virginia Hills (USA) 1971	Ridin' Easy (USA); 1967	Ridan	Nantallah
Dam Virginia Hills (USA) 1971	Ridin' Easy (USA); 1967	Ridan	Rough Shod
Dam Virginia Hills (USA) 1971	Ridin' Easy (USA); 1967	Easy Eight	Eight Thirty
Dam Virginia Hills (USA) 1971	Ridin' Easy (USA); 1967	Easy Eight	Your Game (Family:16-b)
