= Incarville (horse) =

French Thoroughbred racehorse

- Sire: Wootton Bassett
- Grandsire: Iffraaj
- Dam: Ilhabela
- Damsire: Azamour
- Sex: Filly
- Foaled: 4 May 2018
- Country: France
- Colour: Grey
- Breeder: Naji Nahas
- Owner: Gerard Augustin-Normand
- Trainer: David Smaga
- Record: 11: 3-3-0
- Earnings: £203,093

Major wins
- Prix Saint Alary (2021)

Incarville (foaled 4 May 2018) is a French Thoroughbred racehorse. She showed some promise as a two-year-old in 2020 when she won the last two of her four starts. In the following year she ran second in the Prix Penelope and the Prix Cleopatre before winning the Group 1 Prix Saint Alary.

== Background ==
Incarville is a grey filly bred in France by Naji Nahas. She initially raced in the ownership of Gerard Augustin-Normand. The filly was sent into training with David Smaga at Lamorlaye.

She was from the sixth crop of foals sired by Wootton Bassett who won the Prix Jean-Luc Lagardère in 2010. Wootton Bassett's other foals have included Almanzor, Audarya and Wooded. Incarville's dam Ilhabela, from whom she inherited her grey colour, showed modest racing ability, winning two minor races in France. She was a half-sister to the Prix Jacques le Marois winner Vahorimix and, as a descendant of the Maryland-bred broodmare Vadsa (foaled 1979), closely related to Voleuse de Coeurs, Vazira, Valixir, Valyra and Val Royal.

== Racing career ==
=== 2020: two-year-old season ===
Incarville made little impact on her racecourse debut as she came home tenth of the eleven runners in a contest for hitherto unraced juvenile fillies over 1500 metres on good to soft ground at Deauville Racecourse on 4 August. Nineteen days later at the same track she finished second to the Andre Fabre-trained Anasia in a maiden race over 1600 metres, beaten one and a half lengths by the winner. On 1 October the filly was ridden by Cristian Demuro in a maiden over 1800 metres at Compiegne and recorded her first success as she won by four lengths at odds of 3.1/1. Demuro was again in the saddle four weeks later when Incarville started odds on favourite for the Prix de la Masseliere over 1800 metres on heavy ground at Longchamp Racecourse and won by a head from Benita.

=== 2021: three-year-old season ===
For her three-year-old debut Incarville was moved up in class and distance for the Group 3 Prix Penelope over 2100 metres at Saint-Cloud Racecourse on 6 April when she was ridden Christophe Soumillon and finished second of the five runners behind the odds-on favourite Philomene. Over the same course and distance on 1 May she was partnered by Demuro when she finished second again, beaten one and a quarter lengths by Harajuku in the Group 3 Prix Cleopatre after leading for most of the way. On 23 May the filly was moved up in class again for the Group 1 Prix Saint-Alary over 2000 metres on very soft ground at Longchamp in which she was ridden by Soumillon and started the 5.8/1 fifth choice in an eleven-runner field. Penja started favourite while the other contenders included Harajuku, Anasia, Rumi (Prix Vanteaux) and Cirona (Prix de la Grotte). Incarville was settled towards the rear of the field as Cirona set the pace, before beginning to make progress on the outside 500 metres from the finish. She maintained her run and reeled in the leaders before gaining the advantage in the final strides to win by a head from Cirona with Es La Vida another head away in third place. After the race David Smaga said "Besides her first run when she was unplaced, this filly has never run a bad race and definitely has a preference for soft ground–there is no doubt about that. She has also improved with every run this season and is versatile regarding tactics. Christophe Soumillon gave her a great ride."

Incarville was ridden by Gregory Benoist when she started a 21/1 outsider for the Prix de Diane over 2100 metres at Chantilly on 20 June. After being restrained towards the rear in the early stages she made steady progress in the straight but never looked likely to win and came home seventh of the seventeen runners, two and a quarter lengths behind the Irish-trained winner Joan of Arc. On 24 June it was announced that Incarville had been bought by Katsumi Yoshida of Northern Farm.

On her first appearance for her new connections Incarville was dropped to Group 2 class and finished fifth behind Rumi in the Prix de la Nonette at Deauville on 21 August after leading until the last 400 metres. In September she returned to Group 1 class and came home fifth of the seven runners in the Prix Vermeille at Longchamp, beaten almost five lengths by the winner Teona. She ended her season in the Prix de l'Opera at the same track on 3 October when she finished eighth to Rougir.

== Pedigree ==
Pedigree of Incarville (FR), grey filly 2018
Sire Wootton Bassett (GB) 2008	Iffraaj (GB); 2001	Zafonic (FR)	Gone West
Sire Wootton Bassett (GB) 2008	Iffraaj (GB); 2001	Zafonic (FR)	Zaizafon
Sire Wootton Bassett (GB) 2008	Iffraaj (GB); 2001	Pastorale	Nureyev (USA)
Sire Wootton Bassett (GB) 2008	Iffraaj (GB); 2001	Pastorale	Park Appeal (IRE)
Sire Wootton Bassett (GB) 2008	Balladonia (GB); 1996	Primo Dominie	Dominion
Sire Wootton Bassett (GB) 2008	Balladonia (GB); 1996	Primo Dominie	Swan Ann
Sire Wootton Bassett (GB) 2008	Balladonia (GB); 1996	Susquehanna Days (USA)	Chief's Crown
Sire Wootton Bassett (GB) 2008	Balladonia (GB); 1996	Susquehanna Days (USA)	Gliding By
Dam Ilhabela (IRE) 2008	Azamour (IRE); 2001	Night Shift (USA)	Northern Dancer (CAN)
Dam Ilhabela (IRE) 2008	Azamour (IRE); 2001	Night Shift (USA)	Ciboulette (CAN)
Dam Ilhabela (IRE) 2008	Azamour (IRE); 2001	Asmara (USA)	Lear Fan
Dam Ilhabela (IRE) 2008	Azamour (IRE); 2001	Asmara (USA)	Anaza (IRE)
Dam Ilhabela (IRE) 2008	Vadsa Honor (IRE); 1993	Highest Honor	Kenmare
Dam Ilhabela (IRE) 2008	Vadsa Honor (IRE); 1993	Highest Honor	High River
Dam Ilhabela (IRE) 2008	Vadsa Honor (IRE); 1993	Vadsa (USA)	Halo
Dam Ilhabela (IRE) 2008	Vadsa Honor (IRE); 1993	Vadsa (USA)	Rainbow's Edge (Family: 20-d)
