= Zellie =

French Thoroughbred racehorse

- Sire: Wootton Bassett
- Grandsire: Iffraaj
- Dam: Sarai
- Damsire: Nathaniel
- Sex: Filly
- Foaled: 1 February 2019
- Country: France
- Colour: Bay
- Breeder: Charles Barel
- Owner: Lavinia Fabre; Ali Hamad Al Attiya; Al Wasmiyah Farm
- Trainer: Andre Fabre
- Record: 8: 4-3-0
- Earnings: £326,906

Major wins
- Prix Roland de Chambure (2021); Prix Marcel Boussac (2021)

Zellie, (foaled 1 February 2019) is a French Thoroughbred racehorse. She was one of the best juvenile fillies in Europe in 2021 when she won four of her six races including the Group 1 Prix Marcel Boussac.

== Background ==
Zellie is a bay filly with white socks on her hind legs bred in France by Charles Barel. As a foal in December 2019 the filly was consigned Haras du Grandcamp to the Arqana Deauville Breeding Stock Sale and was bought for €140,000 by Bloodstock Management Services. She was sent into training with Andre Fabre and initially raced in the ownership of Fabre's daughter Lavinia.

She was from the seventh crop of foals sired by Wootton Bassett who won the Prix Jean-Luc Lagardère in 2010. Wootton Bassett's other foals have included Almanzor, Audarya and Wooded. Zellie's dam Sarai was a half-sister to Speciosa and closely related to Touching Wood.

== Racing career ==
=== 2021: two-year-old season ===
Zellie made a successful debut when she won a maiden race over 1200 metres on heavy ground at Saint-Cloud Racecourse on 18 May. Three weeks later she started the 2.7/1 second favourite for a race over 1400 metres at the same track. Ridden by Mickael Barzalona she was among the leaders from the start, and after briefly struggling to obtain a clear run accelerated into the lead in the final strides and won by half a length from the favourite Keshana. Barzalona was again in the saddle when Zellie was stepped up in class and started favourite for the Listed Prix Roland de Chambure over 1400 metres at Deauville Racecourse on 11 July. After settling fourth of the five runners she took the lead entering the last 200 metres and drew away to win "easily" by three lengths. After this race Zellie was bought privately by Ali Hamid Al Hattiya.

On 3 August Zellie was again moved up in class and started odds-on favourite for the Group 3 Prix Six Perfections over 1400 metres at Deauville but after having experienced trouble in running she was beaten into second place by the British-trained filly Oscula despite finishing strongly. Hugo Besnier took the ride when the filly started second favourite for the Prix d'Aumale over 1600 metres at Longchamp Racecourse on 9 September. After being restrained at the back of the nine-runner field she produced a strong late run down the outside to take second place behind her stablemate Fleur d'Iris, beaten one and a half lengths by the winner.

On her final run of the season Zellie was partnered by Oisin Murphy when she contested the Group 1 Prix Marcel Boussac over 1600 metres at Longchamp on 3 October. She started the 3.9/1 second favourite behind Fleur d'Iris in an eight-runner field which also included Oscula, Agartha (Debutante Stakes), Who Knows (Prix Francois Boutin) and Acer Alley (Prix La Rochette). Zellie raced towards the rear as Fleur d'Iris set the pace, but began to make rapid progress on the inside in the straight. She gained the advantage from Times Square 100 metres from the finish and won by one and three quarter lengths. After the race Murphy commented " Zellie didn't fly out of the stalls so I had to be patient and hope she'd pick up – when I did get her going she was always going to win", while Fabre said "She's not complicated at all. Who is complicated? Men, not horses. Owners and jockeys, but not horses. I never thought she would be only a two-year-old. She has the scope and ability to be nice next year... I think she'll be limited to a mile... there will be no marathons for her".

=== 2022: three-year-old season ===
Zellie began her second campaign in the Prix Imprudence (a trial race for the Poule d'Essai des Pouliches) over 1400 metres on heavy ground at Deauville on 7 April when she started favourite but was beaten into second place by Malavath. On 1 May Zellie was sent to England and started at odds of 12/1 for the 1000 Guineas over the Rowley Mile at Newmarket Racecourse. Ridden by Tom Marquand she raced in mid-division before staying on well in the closing stages to come home fourth behind Cachet, Prosperous Voyage and Tuesday.

== Pedigree ==
Pedigree of Zellie (FR), bay filly 2019
Sire Wootton Bassett (GB) 2008	Iffraaj (GB); 2001	Zafonic (FR)	Gone West
Sire Wootton Bassett (GB) 2008	Iffraaj (GB); 2001	Zafonic (FR)	Zaizafon
Sire Wootton Bassett (GB) 2008	Iffraaj (GB); 2001	Pastorale	Nureyev (USA)
Sire Wootton Bassett (GB) 2008	Iffraaj (GB); 2001	Pastorale	Park Appeal (IRE)
Sire Wootton Bassett (GB) 2008	Balladonia (GB); 1996	Primo Dominie	Dominion
Sire Wootton Bassett (GB) 2008	Balladonia (GB); 1996	Primo Dominie	Swan Ann
Sire Wootton Bassett (GB) 2008	Balladonia (GB); 1996	Susquehanna Days (USA)	Chief's Crown
Sire Wootton Bassett (GB) 2008	Balladonia (GB); 1996	Susquehanna Days (USA)	Gliding By
Dam Sarai (GB) 2014	Nathaniel (IRE); 2008	Galileo	Sadler's Wells (USA)
Dam Sarai (GB) 2014	Nathaniel (IRE); 2008	Galileo	Urban Sea (USA)
Dam Sarai (GB) 2014	Nathaniel (IRE); 2008	Magnificient Style (USA)	Silver Hawk
Dam Sarai (GB) 2014	Nathaniel (IRE); 2008	Magnificient Style (USA)	Mia Karina
Dam Sarai (GB) 2014	Specifically (USA); 1994	Sky Classic (CAN)	Nijinsky
Dam Sarai (GB) 2014	Specifically (USA); 1994	Sky Classic (CAN)	No Class
Dam Sarai (GB) 2014	Specifically (USA); 1994	Specificity	Alleged
Dam Sarai (GB) 2014	Specifically (USA); 1994	Specificity	Mandera (Family: 8-d)
