= Joan of Arc (horse) =

Irish-bred Thoroughbred racehorse

- Racing silks of Mr Derrick Smith
- Sire: Galileo
- Grandsire: Sadler's Wells
- Dam: You'resothrilling
- Damsire: Storm Cat
- Sex: Mare
- Foaled: 4 February 2018
- Country: Ireland
- Colour: Bay
- Breeder: Coolmore Stud
- Owner: Derrick Smith, Susan Magnier & Michael Tabor
- Trainer: Aidan O'Brien
- Record: 9: 3-2-1
- Earnings: £678,002

Major wins
- Irish 1,000 Guineas Trial (2021); Prix de Diane (2021)

Joan of Arc (foaled 4 February 2018) is an Irish Thoroughbred racehorse. After finishing second on her only start as a juvenile in 2020 she improved in the following year to win the Irish 1,000 Guineas Trial and run second in the Irish 1,000 Guineas before taking the Prix de Diane in France. She went on to run third in the Nassau Stakes.

== Background ==
Joan of Arc is a bay filly with a white blaze and three white socks bred in Ireland by the Coolmore Stud. She was sent into training with Aidan O'Brien at Ballydoyle. She is owned by John Magnier's Coolmore Stud partnership (officially Michael Tabor, Susan Magnier and Derrick Smith), usually racing in the purple and white colours of Derrick Smith.

Joan of Arc was sired by Galileo, who won the Derby, Irish Derby and King George VI and Queen Elizabeth Stakes in 2001. Galileo became one of the world's leading stallions and has been champion sire of Great Britain and Ireland twelve times. His other progeny include Cape Blanco, Frankel, Golden Lilac, Nathaniel, New Approach, Rip Van Winkle and Ruler of the World. Happily's dam You'resothrilling was a sister of the leading racehorse and stallion Giant's Causeway. You'resothrilling was trained by Aidan O'Brien and won the Cherry Hinton Stakes in 2007. Joan of Arc is her seventh foal, the first six being Marvellous, Gleneagles, Coolmore (C L Weld Park Stakes), The Taj Mahal (Zipping Classic), Happily and Vatican City (second in the Irish 2000 Guineas).

== Racing career ==
=== 2020: two-year-old season ===
Joan of Arc began her racing career in a maiden race over seven furlongs on the synthetic Polytrack surface at Dundalk Racecourse on 6 November when she was ridden by Seamie Heffernan and started the 11/10 favourite. After being restrained in the early stages she stayed on well and overtook the front-running outsider Zara Mac 100 metres from the finish, only to be caught on the line and beaten a nose by the Donnacha O'Brien-trained Hazel.

=== 2021: three-year-old season ===
Ryan Moore partnered Joan of Arc when the filly began her second campaign in a seven furlong maiden for fillies and mares of all ages on soft to heavy ground at the Curragh on 21 March. Starting the 4/6 favourite in a twenty-runner field she took the lead two furlongs out and won by one and a quarter lengths from Approach The Dawn. Three weeks later the filly was stepped up in class for the Group 3 1,000 Guineas Trial Stakes at Leopardstown Racecourse and started at 7/1 in a fifteen-runner field. Ridden by Wayne Lordan she recovered from a poor start to dispute the lead a furlong from the finish but tired badly in the closing stages and came home sixth behind the 80/1 outsider Keeper of Time. Ryan Moore resumed his association with the filly when she started 11/4 favourite for the Irish 1,000 Guineas Trial over one mile at Leopardstown on 9 May. She led for most of the way and turned back a sustained challenge from the Henry de Bromhead-trained outsider Flirting Bridge to win by one and three quarter lengths. After the race O'Brien said "She won making the running the first day of the season and last time the pace was a little bit too fast up front, so we thought she'd leave that run behind her. She'd been working lovely and the plan was always to come here and then the Irish Guineas. She's a relaxed filly and nice and balanced and bowled along into that headwind which wasn't easy. She galloped home very well she'll have no problem going up to a mile and a quarter."

At the Curragh on 23 May, with Moore in the saddle Joan of Arc started the 9/2 third favourite for the 99th running of the Irish 1000 Guineas over one mile on heavy ground. She tracked the front-running No Speak Alexander and gained the advantage inside the final furlong but was caught on the line and beaten a short head by her less fancied stablemate Empress Josephine. On 20 June Joan of Arc was sent to France and moved up in distance to contest the Prix de Diane over 2100 metres at Chantilly Racecourse in which she was ridden by Ioritz Mendizabal and went off the 5.3/1 third choice in the betting. The Prix Penelope winner Philomene started favourite while the other fifteen runners included Coeursamba, Incarville, Noble Heidi (Preis der Winterkonigin), Cirona (Prix de la Grotte), Rumi (Prix Vanteaux), Harajuku (Prix Cleopatre) and Rougir (Prix des Reservoirs). After settling in second place behind Sibila Spain, Joan of Arc made steady progress in the straight, took the lead 50 metres from the finish, and won by three quarters of a length from Philomene with Burgarita, Sibila Spain, Rougir and Harajuku close behind. O'Brien, who was winning the race for the first time, said "Ioritz was really impressed with her and he thought a mile and a half was going to be no problem. He said she only got going with a furlong and a half to go. He said she would love stepping up in trip so it has to be a big possibility... She has progressed with every run. She has a lovely mind, is very well balanced, and has a big, long stride. I suppose what was very exciting about her today, she went through the line very well. As the distance grew she was really opening up."

At Goodwood Racecourse on 29 July Joan of Arc was matched against older fillies and mares in the Group 1 Nassau Stakes over ten furlongs. Racing for the first time in England she started the 9/4 joint-favourite with Audarya and led for most of the way. She was overtaken approaching the final furlong but rallied in the closing stages and finished a close third behind Lady Bowthorpe and Zeyaadah. In September she returned to France and came home last of the seven runners in the Prix Vermeille at Longchamp, beaten almost fifteen lengths by the winner Teona after being eased down by Mendizabal in the closing stages. She ended her season in the Prix de l'Opera at the same track on 3 October when she finished tenth to Rougir.

== Pedigree ==
Pedigree of Joan of Arc, bay filly, 2018
Sire Galileo (IRE) 1998	Sadler's Wells (USA); 1981	Northern Dancer (CAN)	Nearctic
Sire Galileo (IRE) 1998	Sadler's Wells (USA); 1981	Northern Dancer (CAN)	Natalma (USA)
Sire Galileo (IRE) 1998	Sadler's Wells (USA); 1981	Fairy Bridge	Bold Reason
Sire Galileo (IRE) 1998	Sadler's Wells (USA); 1981	Fairy Bridge	Special
Sire Galileo (IRE) 1998	Urban Sea (USA); 1989	Miswaki	Mr Prospector
Sire Galileo (IRE) 1998	Urban Sea (USA); 1989	Miswaki	Hopespringseternal
Sire Galileo (IRE) 1998	Urban Sea (USA); 1989	Allegretta (GB)	Lombard (GER)
Sire Galileo (IRE) 1998	Urban Sea (USA); 1989	Allegretta (GB)	Anatevka (GER)
Dam You'resothrilling (USA) 2005	Storm Cat (USA); 1983	Storm Bird (CAN)	Northern Dancer
Dam You'resothrilling (USA) 2005	Storm Cat (USA); 1983	Storm Bird (CAN)	South Ocean
Dam You'resothrilling (USA) 2005	Storm Cat (USA); 1983	Terlingua	Secretariat
Dam You'resothrilling (USA) 2005	Storm Cat (USA); 1983	Terlingua	Crimson Saint
Dam You'resothrilling (USA) 2005	Mariah's Storm (USA); 1991	Rahy	Blushing Groom (FR)
Dam You'resothrilling (USA) 2005	Mariah's Storm (USA); 1991	Rahy	Glorious Song (CAN)
Dam You'resothrilling (USA) 2005	Mariah's Storm (USA); 1991	Immense	Roberto
Dam You'resothrilling (USA) 2005	Mariah's Storm (USA); 1991	Immense	Imsodear(Family: 11)

- Joan of Arc is inbred 3 × 4 to Northern Dancer, meaning that this stalliom appears in both the third and fourth generations of her pedigree.
