= Rougir =

French racehorse

- Sire: Territories
- Grandsire: Invincible Spirit
- Dam: Summer Moon
- Damsire: Elusive City
- Sex: Filly
- Foaled: 26 March 2018
- Country: France
- Color: Chestnut
- Breeder: Jan Krauze
- Owner: Le Haras De La Gousserie; Peter Brant & Michael Tabor
- Trainer: Cedric Rossi; Chad Brown
- Record: 19: 6-1-3
- Earnings: $1,037,824

Major wins
- Prix des Reservoirs (2020); Prix de l'Opera (2021); Beaugay Stakes (2022); E. P. Taylor Stakes (2022)

Rougir (foaled 26 March 2018) is a French-bred Thoroughbred racehorse. As a two-year-old in 2020 she won three races including the Group 3 Prix des Reservoirs and also finished third in the Group 1 Prix Marcel Boussac. In the following year she was beaten in her first six races before taking the Prix de l'Opera and at the end of the season she was sold for €3,000,000. She was then sent to race in the United States where she won the Beaugay Stakes and Grade I E. P. Taylor Stakes as a four-year-old.

== Background ==
Rougir is a chestnut filly with a white star and white socks on her hind legs bred in France by Jan Krauze. In November 2018 as a foal she was auctioned at the Arqana Breeding Stock Sale and was bought for €11,000 by Guy Petit. In August 2019 she was consigned to the Arqana Yearling Sale at Deauville and was sold for €55,000 to the bloodstock agent Francois Dupuis. She entered the ownership of the Mayenne-based Haras de La Gousserie and was sent into training with Cedric Rossi at the Calas training centre near Marseille.

She was from the first crop of foals sired by Territories, whose wins included the Prix Jean Prat. Rougir's dam Summer Moon showed some racing ability, winning two minor races and finishing second in the Listed Prix Coronation. She was descended from the Irish broodmare Kalkeen whose other descendants have included Kahyasi, Milan and Kastoria.

== Racing career ==
=== 2020: two-year-old season ===
On 10 June, Rougir was ridden by Mickael Barzalona when she made her racecourse debut in maiden race over 1400 metres on good to soft ground at Chantilly Racecourse. She started at odds of 8/1 in an eleven-runner field and won by a length from Isle of White. The filly went off the 2/1 second favourite for the Prix de l'Aunette over the same distance at Saint-Cloud Racecourse on 2 July and won again, beating the favoured Cherie Amour by three quarters of a length.

The filly was then stepped up in class for the Group 3 Prix Six Perfections at Deauville Racecourse and came home fifth of the six runners behind See The Rose, beaten eight lengths by the winner. She was then matched against male opposition in the Prix Christian Rollet at Lyon Parilly on 1 September and finished a close third behind the colt King Shalaa. She was then moved up to the highest level to contest the Group 1 Prix Marcel Boussac at Longchamp Racecourse on 4 October. Starting a 32/1 outsider she raced in mid-division before staying on strongly in the straight and finishing third behind Tiger Tanaka and Tasmania.

Sixteen days after her run in the Prix Marcel Boussac, Rougir started the 2.1/1 favourite for the Group 3 Prix des Reservoirs over 1600 metres on very soft ground at Deauville. Ridden by Barzalona she tracked the leaders before finishing strongly, gaining the advantage in the last 100 metres and winning by a neck from Cirona. After the race Cedric Rossi said "She is all class and gave us all the good signs before the race... she concluded her season in the most perfect manner. She will be a nice Classic prospect for next year and is my little champion."

=== 2021: three-year-old season ===
Rougir began her second campaign in the Group 3 Prix de la Grotte over 1600 metres at Longchamp on 18 April and came home sixth behind Cirona, although she finished only one and a half lengths behind the winner in a blanket finish. In the Group 1 Poule d'Essai des Pouliches over the same course and distance four weeks later she started at odds of 17/1 and finished eighth of the thirteen runners behind Coeursamba after making "modest headway" from the rear of the field in the last 400 metres. She was then moved up in distance for the Prix de Diane over 2100 metres at Chantilly on 20 June when she went off a 37/1 outsider and finished fifth to Joan of Arc, beaten one and a half lengths by the winner. Rougir was then dropped back in class and distance for the Group 3 Prix Chloe over 1800 metres at Chantilly in July and ran second, beaten a head by the winner Noticeable Grace. In the Group 1 Prix Rothschild over 1600 metres at Deauville on 3 August she started a 22/1 outsider and finished strongly to take fourth place behind Mother Earth beaten less than half a length by the winner. The Group 2 Prix de la Nonette over 2000 metres later that month at the same track saw another tight finish, with Rougir being beaten a nose and a short neck into third place by Rumi and Penza.

On 3 October Rougir, ridden by Maxime Guyon, went off at odds of 22.9/1 for the Group 1 Prix de l'Opera over 2000 metres on heavy ground at Loncgchamp. Audarya started favourite, while the other twelve contenders included Joan of Arc, Grand Glory, Incarville, Thundering Nights and Palmas (Preis der Diana). She raced towards the rear of the field for most of the way before producing a strong run on the outside in the last 400 metres and ran down Grand Glory in the final stride to win by a nose. Rossi commented "She wasn't drawn ideally, but she is just phenomenal. The Breeders' Cup could be next. The faster they go the better for her. She wants to go a mile pace, but stays 2,000 metres. America should suit her and she goes on any ground, as all the good ones do. She has not been beaten far several times when there hasn't been enough pace on this year, and fortunately it went our way here."

For her final run of the year Rougir was shipped to America to contest the Grade I Breeders' Cup Filly & Mare Turf at Del Mar on 6 November and came home seventh of the twelve runners behind Loves Only You.

In December 2021 Rougir was consigned to the Arqana Breeding Stock Sale and was bought for €3,000,000 by Oceanic Bloodstock (Anne-Sophie Yoh) on behalf of White Birch Farm and the Coolmore Stud.

=== 2022: four-year-old season ===
For the 2022 season, Rougir was sent to race in the United States and was sent into training with Chad Brown. On her first appearance for her new connections she was ridden by Flavien Prat hen she started odds-on favourite for the Grade 3 Beaugay Stakes over eight and a half furlongs at Belmont Park on 14 May. After being restrained towards the rear of the seven-runner field she took the lead inside the final furlong and drew away in the closing stages to win "comfortably" by three lengths from Our Flash Drive. Chad Brown commented "She's got a terrific turn of foot and she had a terrific winter... Obviously, she had good form prior and was a super talented horse before we got her. But we were able to get her acclimated and put a lot of weight on her. Her coat really came around and was shining by the time we had her ready to run."

On 10 June, Rougir started favourite for the Grade I New York Stakes over a mile and a quarter at the same track but came home fifth behind her stablemate Bleecker Street, beaten a length by the winner. She then finished fourth in the Diana Stakes at Saratoga on 16 July, losing to a different stablemate, In Italian, after having a terrible trip. On August 13, she went off as the favourite in the Beverly D. Stakes at Churchill Downs but turned in a dull performance to finish last.

After the three race losing streak, Rougir was given a brief layoff then returned on 8 October in the Grade I E. P. Taylor Stakes at Woodbine Racetrack. In the early running, she raced near the back of the field before starting to make up ground on the final turn. However, another horse came out into her path, forcing her to check sharply. She regrouped and swung wide, then launched a sustained drive to win by a neck. "I almost clipped heels", noted jockey Kazushi Kimura. "I was so confident to ride a European horse because they already have experience from the long stretch. Those horses can run good here at Woodbine."

== Pedigree ==
Pedigree of Rougir (FR), chestnut filly, 2018
Sire Territories (IRE) 2012	Invincible Spirit (IRE); 1997	Green Desert (USA)	Danzig
Sire Territories (IRE) 2012	Invincible Spirit (IRE); 1997	Green Desert (USA)	Foreign Courier
Sire Territories (IRE) 2012	Invincible Spirit (IRE); 1997	Rafha (GB)	Kris
Sire Territories (IRE) 2012	Invincible Spirit (IRE); 1997	Rafha (GB)	Eljazzi (IRE)
Sire Territories (IRE) 2012	Taranto (GB); 2003	Machiavellian (USA)	Mr Prospector
Sire Territories (IRE) 2012	Taranto (GB); 2003	Machiavellian (USA)	Coup de Folie
Sire Territories (IRE) 2012	Taranto (GB); 2003	Magna Graecia (IRE)	Warning (GB)
Sire Territories (IRE) 2012	Taranto (GB); 2003	Magna Graecia (IRE)	Grecian Slipper (GB)
Dam Summer Moon (FR) 2011	Elusive City (USA); 2000	Elusive Quality	Gone West
Dam Summer Moon (FR) 2011	Elusive City (USA); 2000	Elusive Quality	Touch of Greatness
Dam Summer Moon (FR) 2011	Elusive City (USA); 2000	Star of Paris	Dayjur
Dam Summer Moon (FR) 2011	Elusive City (USA); 2000	Star of Paris	Liturgism
Dam Summer Moon (FR) 2011	Kalatuna (FR); 2001	Green Tune (USA)	Green Dancer
Dam Summer Moon (FR) 2011	Kalatuna (FR); 2001	Green Tune (USA)	Soundings
Dam Summer Moon (FR) 2011	Kalatuna (FR); 2001	Kalasinger	Chief Singer (IRE)
Dam Summer Moon (FR) 2011	Kalatuna (FR); 2001	Kalasinger	Kasala (USA) (Family: 5-e)
