= Wootton Bassett (horse) =

British Thoroughbred racehorse and sire (2008–2025)

- Sire: Iffraaj
- Grandsire: Zafonic
- Dam: Balladonia
- Damsire: Primo Dominie
- Sex: Stallion
- Foaled: 4 February 2008
- Died: 23 September 2025 (aged 17)
- Country: United Kingdom
- Colour: Bay
- Breeder: Laundry Cottage Stud Farm
- Owner: Frank Brady & The Cosmic Cases
- Trainer: Richard Fahey
- Record: 9: 5-0-0
- Earnings: £541,704

Major wins
- Prix Jean-Luc Lagardère (2010)
- Last updated on 23 September 2025

Wootton Bassett (4 February 2008 – 23 September 2025) was a British-bred Thoroughbred racehorse and sire. He was one of the best two-year-olds in Europe in 2010, when he was undefeated in five races including the Prix Jean-Luc Lagardère. The colt failed to win in 2011 and was retired from racing at the end of the season. He had considerable success as a sire of winners, standing at stud in France and being purchased by Coolmore Stud in Ireland in 2020.

== Background ==
Wootton Bassett was a dark bay brown horse with a small white star bred in England by the Hertfordshire-based Laundry Cottage Stud. In September 2009 he was put up for auction at the Doncaster St Leger Yearling Sale and was bought for 44,000 guineas by Bobby O'Ryan. He entered the ownership of Frank Brady & The Cosmic Cases and was sent into training with Richard Fahey at Malton, North Yorkshire.

He was sired by Iffraaj, who won the Group 2 Park Stakes twice and the Lennox Stakes once, as well as finishing second in the 2006 July Cup. His other progeny include Rizeena, Chriselliam and Ribchester. Wootton Bassett's dam Balladonia (by top sprinter Primo Dominie) showed some racing ability, winning one of her eighteen races and twice finishing placed in the Listed Hoppings Stakes. She was a granddaughter of the American broodmare Gliding By (foaled 1975), making her a close relative of St Leger winner Silver Patriarch.

== Racing career ==
=== 2010: two-year-old season ===
Wootton Bassett began his racing career in a maiden race over six furlongs at Ayr Racecourse on 19 June in which he was ridden by Tony Hamilton and won by one and a quarter lengths from five opponents at odds of 11/4. He was ridden in all of his subsequent races by Paul Hanagan. On 15 July at Doncaster Racecourse the colt startes 2/5 favourite for a six furlong novice race (for horses with no more than two previous wins) and won by two lengths from Forjatt after leading from the start. At York Racecourse on 19 August Wootton Bassett started 5/4 favourite for the DBS Premier Yearling Stakes, a valuable event restricted to juveniles sold at Doncaster in the previous year. He disputed the lead from the start and drew ahead of his rivals in the final furlong to win by one and three quarter lengths from Galtymore Lad. In another valuable sales race, the Weatherbys Insurance £300,000 2-Y-O Stakes, at Doncaster Racecourse on 9 September, the colt defeated Galtymore Lad again, staying on strongly in the closing stages to win by a length.

For his final run of the year Wootton Bassett was sent to France and stepped up in class to contest the Prix Jean-Luc Lagardère over 1400 metres on very soft ground at Longchamp Racecourse on 3 October. He started second favourite behind the filly Moonlight Cloud in a nine-runner field which also included My Name Is Bond (winner of the Prix La Rochette), Tin Horse (runner-up in the Prix Morny) and King Torus (Vintage Stakes). Wootton Bassett took the lead soon after the start, opened up a clear advantage 500 metres from the finish, and came home two and a half lengths clear of Maiguri and Tin Horse, who dead-heated for second place. Hanagan commented: "The race went perfectly to plan for us and really it's all about enjoying the moment. I've waited such a long time for my first Group One and now it has happened", while Richard Fahey said "We wanted to make plenty of use of him as we felt he would stay well. He's the first proper Group horse I have had since Utmost Respect, and you would have to look down the Classic route now. I put him in the Irish Guineas a while ago and I will put him in the English and French Guineas as well."

=== 2011: three-year-old season ===
Wootton Bassett began his second campaign at Longchamp on 15 May when he started favourite for the Poule d'Essai des Poulains but after leading for most of the way he was overtaken in the last 200 metres and sustained his first defeat as came home fifth of the fourteen runners behind Tin Horse. At Royal Ascot in June he made little impact in the St James's Palace Stakes as he finished seventh behind Frankel beaten fourteen lengths by the winner. Wootton Bassett was dropped back to sprint distances for his two remaining races but failed to recover his juvenile form as he finished fifth behind Moonlight Cloud in the Prix Maurice de Gheest at Deauville Racecourse in August and thirteenth behind Dream Ahead in the Haydock Sprint Cup on 3 September.

== Stud record ==
Wootton Bassett was retired from racing to become a breeding stallion. He was based at the Haras d'Etreham in France before being sold to stand for the Coolmore Stud in 2020. His stallion fee in the 2023 season was €150,000, which was increased to €200,000 for 2024.

He died aged 17 on 23 September 2025 at Coolmore Australia stud from influenza brought on by choke. At the time of his death he was standing for an Australian record fee of AU$385,000.

=== Notable progeny ===
Wootton Bassett's 23 Group One winners:

c = colt, f = filly, g = gelding

Foaled	Name	Sex	Major wins
2013	Almanzor	c	Prix du Jockey Club, Irish Champion Stakes, Champion Stakes
2016	Audarya	f	Prix Jean Romanet, Breeders' Cup Filly & Mare Turf
2017	Wooded	c	Prix de l'Abbaye de Longchamp
2018	Incarville	f	Prix Saint-Alary
2019	Royal Patronage	c	Canterbury Stakes
2019	Zellie	f	Prix Marcel Boussac
2020	Al Riffa	c	National Stakes, Grosser Preis von Berlin, Irish St. Leger
2020	King of Steel	c	Champion Stakes
2021	Bucanero Fuerte	c	Phoenix Stakes
2021	Unquestionable	c	Breeders' Cup Juvenile Turf
2022	Camille Pissarro	c	Prix Jean-Luc Lagardère, Prix du Jockey Club
2022	Comanche Brave	c	July Cup, Flying Five Stakes
2022	Henri Matisse	c	Breeders' Cup Juvenile Turf, Poule d'Essai des Poulains
2022	Maranoa Charlie	c	Prix de la Forêt
2022	Providence	c	Queensland Derby
2022	Tennessee Stud	c	Criterium de Saint-Cloud
2022	Twain	c	Criterium International
2022	Whirl	f	Pretty Polly Stakes, Nassau Stakes
2023	Constitution River	c	Prix du Jockey Club, Eclipse Stakes
2023	Hawk Mountain	c	Futurity Trophy
2023	Puerto Rico	c	Prix Jean-Luc Lagardère
2023	Stormy Marco	c	Victoria Derby
2023	Talk Of New York	c	Queen Elizabeth II Stakes

== Pedigree ==
Pedigree of Wootton Bassett (GB), bay stallion, 2008
Sire Iffraaj (GB) 2001	Zafonic (USA); 1990	Gone West	Mr. Prospector
Sire Iffraaj (GB) 2001	Zafonic (USA); 1990	Gone West	Secrettame
Sire Iffraaj (GB) 2001	Zafonic (USA); 1990	Zaizafon	The Minstrel (CAN)
Sire Iffraaj (GB) 2001	Zafonic (USA); 1990	Zaizafon	Mofida (GB)
Sire Iffraaj (GB) 2001	Pastorale (GB); 1988	Nureyev (USA)	Northern Dancer (CAN)
Sire Iffraaj (GB) 2001	Pastorale (GB); 1988	Nureyev (USA)	Special
Sire Iffraaj (GB) 2001	Pastorale (GB); 1988	Park Appeal (IRE)	Ahonoora (GB)
Sire Iffraaj (GB) 2001	Pastorale (GB); 1988	Park Appeal (IRE)	Balidaress
Dam Balladonia (GB) 1996	Primo Dominie (GB); 1982	Dominion	Derring-Do
Dam Balladonia (GB) 1996	Primo Dominie (GB); 1982	Dominion	Picture Palace
Dam Balladonia (GB) 1996	Primo Dominie (GB); 1982	Swan Ann	My Swanee
Dam Balladonia (GB) 1996	Primo Dominie (GB); 1982	Swan Ann	Anna Barry
Dam Balladonia (GB) 1996	Susquehanna Days (USA); 1990	Chief's Crown	Danzig
Dam Balladonia (GB) 1996	Susquehanna Days (USA); 1990	Chief's Crown	Six Crowns
Dam Balladonia (GB) 1996	Susquehanna Days (USA); 1990	Gliding By	Tom Rolfe
Dam Balladonia (GB) 1996	Susquehanna Days (USA); 1990	Gliding By	Key Bridge (Family: 2-n)
