= Prix Texanita =

- Class: Group 3
- Location: Maisons-Laffitte; France
- Inaugurated: 2013
- Race type: Flat / Thoroughbred
- Website: france-galop.com

Race information
- Distance: 1,100 metres (5½f)
- Surface: Turf
- Track: Straight
- Qualification: Three-year-olds
- Weight: 55½ kg Allowances; 1½ kg for fillies Penalties; 4 kg for Group 1 winners 3 kg for Group 2 winners 2 kg for Group 3 winners
- Purse: €80,000 (2018); 1st: €40,000

Prix Texanita
2024
Monteille	Classic Flower	Miaharris

Previous years
2023
Believing	Shalromy	Moon Ray
2022
Kingentleman	Le Cadeau	Haziym
2021
Suesa	Louliana	Bavaria Express

2020-2013
2020
Wooded	Alocasia	My Love's Passion
2019
Ilanga	Milord's Song	Cigalera
2018
Alistair	Beau Ideal	Arecibo
2017
Aladdine	City Light	Straight Right
2016
Ross Castle	Sangria	Damila
2015
Goken	Finsbury Square	Volatile
2014
Rangali	Son Cesio	Harlem Shake
2013
Mazameer	Wedge Trust	Via Chope

The Prix Texanita is a Group 3 flat horse race in France open to three-year-old thoroughbreds. The race is run at Chantilly over 1,200 metres in May. The race was previously run over a distance of 1,100 metres (about 5½ furlongs) at Maisons-Laffitte until the racecourse was closed in October 2019.

== History ==
The event is named after Texanita, a successful French-trained sprinter in the 1960s. It was established in 2013, and initially held Listed status.

The Prix Texanita was promoted to Group 3 level in 2015. The promotion was part of a restructured programme for three-year-old sprinters in Europe.

== Records ==
Leading jockey (2 wins):

- Olivier Peslier - Goken (2015), Suesa (2021)

Leading trainer (2 wins):

- Henri-Alex Pantall – Rangali (2014), Goken (2015)
- Freddy Head - Mazameer (2013), Aladdine (2017)
- Didier Guillemin - Alistair (2018), Ilanga (2019)

Leading owner (2 wins):

- Guy Pariente - Goken (2015), Kingentleman (2022)

== Winners ==
Year	Winner	Jockey	Trainer	Owner	Time
2013	Mazameer	Thierry Jarnet	Freddy Head	Hamdan Al Maktoum	1:03.90
2014	Rangali	Fabrice Veron	Henri-Alex Pantall	Henri-Alex Pantall	1:06.50
2015	Goken	Olivier Peslier	Henri-Alex Pantall	Guy Pariente	1:03.10
2016	Ross Castle	Tony Piccone	Matthieu Palussière	Palussière / Teehan	1:07.69
2017	Aladdine	Aurelien Lemaitre	Freddy Head	Mme Freddy Head	1:01.50
2018	Alistair	Cristian Demuro	Didier Guillemin	Karimine Stud / Ecurie Jarlan	1:03.33
2019	Ilanga	Alexandre Gavilan	Didier Guillemin	Zied Ben M'Rad	1:13.11
2020	Wooded	Pierre-Charles Boudot	Francis-Henri Graffard	Al Shaqab Racing	1:08.90
2021	Suesa	Olivier Peslier	Francois Rohaut	George Strawbridge	1:12.50
2022	Kingentleman	Grégory Benoist	Pia & Joakim Brandt	Guy Pariente	1:10.53
2023	Believing	Mickael Barzalona	George Boughey	Highclere T'Bred Racing - Jane Addams	1:09.50
2024	Monteille	Alexis Pouchin	Pascal Bary	Gerard Augustin-Normand	1:10.33
2025	Woodshauna	Christophe Soumillon	Francis-Henri Graffard	Al Shaqab Racing	1:08.67
2026	Dostoievsky	Christophe Soumillon	Mauricio Delcher Sanchez	Alain Jathiere, Gousserie Racing & Gerard Augustin-Normand	1:13:54

== See also ==
- List of French flat horse races
