= Wooded (horse) =

Irish-bred Thoroughbred racehorse

- Sire: Wootton Bassett
- Grandsire: Iffraaj
- Dam: Frida La Blonde
- Damsire: Elusive City
- Sex: Colt
- Foaled: 27 March 2017
- Country: Ireland
- Colour: Bay
- Breeder: Gestut Zur Kuste
- Owner: Al Shaqab Racing
- Trainer: Francis-Henri Graffard
- Record: 9: 3-3-1
- Earnings: £205,747

Major wins
- Prix Texanita (2020); Prix de l'Abbaye (2020)

Wooded (foaled 27 March 2017) is an Irish-bred, French-trained Thoroughbred racehorse and sire. He showed promising form as a juvenile in 2019 when he won one minor race and was placed in both the Prix La Rochette and the Prix Thomas Bryon. He won the Prix Texanita on this three-year-old debut but was beaten in his next three starts before recording his biggest win on his final start when he took the Group 1 Prix de l'Abbaye. He was retired from racing at the end of the year.

== Background ==
Wooded is a bay colt with a white star and three white socks bred in Ireland by the Swiss-based breeding company Gestüt Zur Kuste. As a yearling in October 2018 he was consigned to the Arqana Deauville sale and was bought for €90,00 by Al Shaqab Racing. He was sent into training with Francis-Henri Graffard at Chantilly.

He was from the fifth crop of foals sired by Wootton Bassett who won the Prix Jean-Luc Lagardère in 2010. Wootton Bassett's other foals have included Almanzor and Audarya. Wooded's dam Frida La Blonde showed no racing ability, failing to win or place in six starts, but did better as a broodmare: her only previous foal was Beat Le Bon who won four races and finished second in the Sovereign Stakes. She was a female-line descendant of the British broodmare Alicia, making her a distant relative of Mr Jinks.

== Racing career ==
=== 2019: two-year-old season ===
On his racecourse debut Wooded started 2.8/1 joint favourite for a maiden race over 1400 metres on heavy ground at Dieppe in which he was ridden by Stephane Pasquier and finished second by a short neck to Derbysim. In his next race, a maiden over the same distance at Deauville Racecourse on 13 August the colt was ridden for the first time by Pierre-Charles Boudot who became his regular jockey. Starting at odds of 2.2/1 in an eight-runner field he took the lead 100 metres from the finish and won by one and three quarter lengths from the favourite Repel Ghosts. In the Group 3 Prix La Rochette at Longchamp Racecourse three weeks later he ran second by a short neck to Kenway, taking the lead inside 70 metres from the finish but being overtaken in the final strides. On his final run of the year he started at odds of 6/1 for the Prix Thomas Bryon at Saint-Cloud Racecourse on 4 October and came home third behind the British challengers King's Command and Royal Crusade.

=== 2020: three-year-old season ===
The 2020 flat racing season in Europe was disrupted by the COVID-19 pandemic, which saw many of the early meetings abandoned before racing resumed under tight restrictions. On his first appearance of the year Wooded was dropped back to sprint distances and started the 2.4/1 favourite for the Group 3 Prix Texanita over 1200 metres at Chantilly Racecourse on 13 May. After racing in mid-division he took the lead 300 metres from the finish and drew away to win by three and a half lengths from the filly Alocasia. His owner's representative Rupert Pritchard-Gordon commented: "He confirmed that he has a lot of speed. Wooded has done well over the winter and has strengthened up. Pierre-Charles got a nice lead into the race and allowed him to find his own rhythm." Plans to send the colt to England to contest the Commonwealth Cup at Royal Ascot in June were cancelled owing to the ongoing COVID restrictions.

Christophe Soumillon took the ride when Wooded started a 16/1 outsider for the Group 1 Prix Jean Prat over 1400 metes at Deauville in July and came home fourth behind Pinatubo, Lope Y Fernandez and Malotru, beaten three and a half lengths by the winner. In the Prix Maurice de Gheest over 1300 metres at the same track in August he was reunited with Boudot and finished sixth of the eleven runners behind Space Blues, staying on well in the closing stages without ever looking likely to win. The colt was then dropped in class and distance to run second to the four-year-old filly Air de Valse when starting favourite for the Group 3 Prix du Petit Couvert over 1000 metres at Longchamp on 13 September.

In the Prix de l'Abbaye over 1000 metres on heavy ground at Longchamp on 4 October Wooded was partnered by Boudot and started the 6.5/1 fourth choice in the betting behind Glass Slippers, Make A Challenge (Abergwaun Stakes) and Keep Busy (Prix Yacowlef). The other seven contenders for the Group 1 prize were Air de Valse, Liberty Beach (Molecomb Stakes), Livachope (Prix du Bois), Archer's Dream (Cathedral Stakes), Lady In France (Arran Scottish Fillies' Sprint Stakes), Batwan (Prix de Saint-Georges) and Sestilio Jet (2019 Prix de Saint-Georges). After racing in mid-division Wooded gained the advantage from Glass Slippers 300 metres and got the better of a sustained struggle with the rallying favourite to win by a neck. After the race Graffard said "I'm absolutely over the moon for him. I've always held him in the highest regard, but the season has gone a bit wrong. We haven't found the races over the right trip. I was confident ahead of the Commonwealth Cup, but sadly we had to miss it as we were unable to travel over. I was really gutted and he's struggled since, but he galloped last week and Pierre-Charles said he felt like a different horse. He's much better on fast ground so I didn't have high expectations, but we had to run as there were no races left for him this year."

== Stud career ==
Shortly after his win in the Abbaye, it was announced that Wooded had been retired from racing and would begin his career as a breeding stallion at his owner's Haras de Bouquetot in Normandy.

=== Notable progeny ===
c = colt, f = filly, g = gelding

Foaled	Name	Sex	Major wins
2022	Woodshauna	c	Prix Jean Prat

== Pedigree ==
Pedigree of Wooded (IRE), bay colt 2017
Sire Wootton Bassett (GB) 2008	Iffraaj (GB); 2001	Zafonic (USA)	Gone West
Sire Wootton Bassett (GB) 2008	Iffraaj (GB); 2001	Zafonic (USA)	Zaizafon
Sire Wootton Bassett (GB) 2008	Iffraaj (GB); 2001	Pastorale	Nureyev (USA)
Sire Wootton Bassett (GB) 2008	Iffraaj (GB); 2001	Pastorale	Park Appeal (IRE)
Sire Wootton Bassett (GB) 2008	Balladonia (GB); 1996	Primo Dominie	Dominion
Sire Wootton Bassett (GB) 2008	Balladonia (GB); 1996	Primo Dominie	Swan Ann
Sire Wootton Bassett (GB) 2008	Balladonia (GB); 1996	Susquehanna Days (USA)	Chief's Crown
Sire Wootton Bassett (GB) 2008	Balladonia (GB); 1996	Susquehanna Days (USA)	Gliding By
Dam Frida La Blonde (FR) 2011	Elusive City (USA); 2000	Elusive Quality	Gone West
Dam Frida La Blonde (FR) 2011	Elusive City (USA); 2000	Elusive Quality	Touch of Greatness
Dam Frida La Blonde (FR) 2011	Elusive City (USA); 2000	Star of Paris	Dayjur
Dam Frida La Blonde (FR) 2011	Elusive City (USA); 2000	Star of Paris	Liturgism
Dam Frida La Blonde (FR) 2011	Firm Friend (IRE); 1990	Affirmed (USA)	Exclusive Native
Dam Frida La Blonde (FR) 2011	Firm Friend (IRE); 1990	Affirmed (USA)	Won't Tell You
Dam Frida La Blonde (FR) 2011	Firm Friend (IRE); 1990	Chere Amie (FR)	Gay Mecene (USA)
Dam Frida La Blonde (FR) 2011	Firm Friend (IRE); 1990	Chere Amie (FR)	Chere Alise (Family: 22-d)

- Wooded was inbred 4 × 4 to Gone West, meaning that this stallion appears twice in the fourth generation of his pedigree.
