= August Stakes =

Flat horse race in Britain

- Class: Listed
- Location: Windsor Racecourse; Windsor, England
- Race type: Flat / Thoroughbred
- Sponsor: Weatherbys
- Website: Windsor

Race information
- Distance: 1m 3f 99y (2,303 metres)
- Surface: Turf
- Track: Left and right-handed
- Qualification: Four-years-old and up exc. Group 1 and Group 2 winners after 2024.
- Weight: 8 st 13 lb (3yo); 9 st 7 lb (4yo+); Allowances; 5 lb for fillies Penalties; 5 lb for Group winners* 3 lb for Listed winners* * after 2024
- Purse: £55,000 (2025); 1st: £31,191

August Stakes
2026
Tenability	Silawi	White Birch

Previous years
2025
Arabian Crown	Caviar Heights	Nightwalker
2024
Sea Of Roses	Deira Mile	Aimeric
2023
Candleford	Solid Stone	Lion's Pride
2022
Cresta	Maksud	Groundbreaker
2021
Teona	Desert Encounter	Fox Tal

2020-2011
2020
Le Don De Vie	Communique	Desert Encounter
2019
Raakib Alhawa	Grace And Danger	Lucius Tiberius
2018
Desert Encounter	Game Starter	Prize Money
2017
Second Step	Law And Order	King Bolete
2016
Berkshire	Majeed	Second Step
2015
Beautiful Romance	Gospel Choir	Gibeon
2014
Glorious Protector	Pinzolo	Energia Fox
2013
Cameron Highland	Shirocco Star	Souviens Toi
2012
Cameron Highland	Goldoni	Songcraft
2011
Opera Gal	Sirvino	Elusive Pimpernel

2010-2004
2010
Whispering Gallery	Traffic Guard	Pompeyano
2009
Traffic Guard	Warringah	Classic Punch
2008
Spanish Moon	Ronaldsay	Hattan
2007
Dragon Dancer	Classic Punch	Imperial Star
2006
Crocodile Dundee	Khyber Kim	Ouninpohja
2005
Orcadian	Counsel's Opinion	Frank Sonata
2004
Naheef	Hawridge Prince	Compton Bolter

The August Stakes is a Listed flat horse race in Great Britain open to horses aged four years or older. It is run at Windsor over a distance of 1 mile 3 furlongs and 99 yards (2,303 metres), and it is scheduled to take place each year in August.

The race was first run as a Listed race in 2004 having previously been run as a lower class race. Prior to 2026 it was also open to horses aged three years.

== Winners ==
Year	Winner	Age	Jockey	Trainer	Time
2000	Happy Change	6	Michael Hills	Mark Johnston	2:30.30
2001	Delius	4	Kieren Fallon	Sir Michael Stoute	2:27.00
2002	Arctic Owl	8	Richard Hughes	James Fanshawe	2:26.50
2003	Gamut	4	Kieren Fallon	Sir Michael Stoute	2:27.91
2004	Naheef	5	Kerrin McEvoy	Saeed bin Suroor	2:33.27
2005	Orcadian	4	Richard Hughes	James Eustace	2:27.28
2006	Crocodile Dundee	5	Jamie Spencer	Luca Cumani	2:27.20
2007	Dragon Dancer	4	Darryll Holland	Geoff Wragg	2:31.21
2008	Spanish Moon	4	Ryan Moore	Sir Michael Stoute	2:24.83
2009	Traffic Guard	5	Martin Dwyer	Paul Cole	2:23.54
2010	Whispering Gallery	4	Ted Durcan	Saeed bin Suroor	2:31.84
2011	Opera Gal	4	Jimmy Fortune	Andrew Balding	2:29.63
2012	Cameron Highland	3	Neil Callan	Roger Varian	2:27.53
2013	Cameron Highland	4	Andrea Atzeni	Roger Varian	2:30.02
2014	Glorious Protector	4	George Baker	Ed Walker	2:23.17
2015	Beautiful Romance	3	Harry Bentley	Saeed bin Suroor	2:28.85
2016	Berkshire	5	Jim Crowley	Paul Cole	2:23.60
2017	Second Step	6	Jamie Spencer	Roger Charlton	2:26.44
2018	Desert Encounter	6	Harry Bentley	David Simcock	2:28.50
2019	Raakib Alhawa	3	Jamie Spencer	David Simcock	2:25.23
2020	Le Don De Vie	4	Hollie Doyle	Hughie Morrison	2:35.77
2021	Teona	3	Ray Dawson	Roger Varian	2:23.92
2022	Cresta	3	Richard Kingscote	Freddie & Martyn Meade	2:23.38
2023	Candleford	5	Pat Dobbs	William Haggas	2:25.26
2024	Sea Of Roses	4	Hayley Turner	Andrew Balding	2:29.02
2025	Arabian Crown	4	Billy Loughnane	Charlie Appleby	2:22.62
2026	Tenability	4	Tom Marquand	William Haggas	2:29.53

== See also ==
- Horse racing in Great Britain
- List of British flat horse races
