= Ioritz Mendizabal =

Spanish jockey

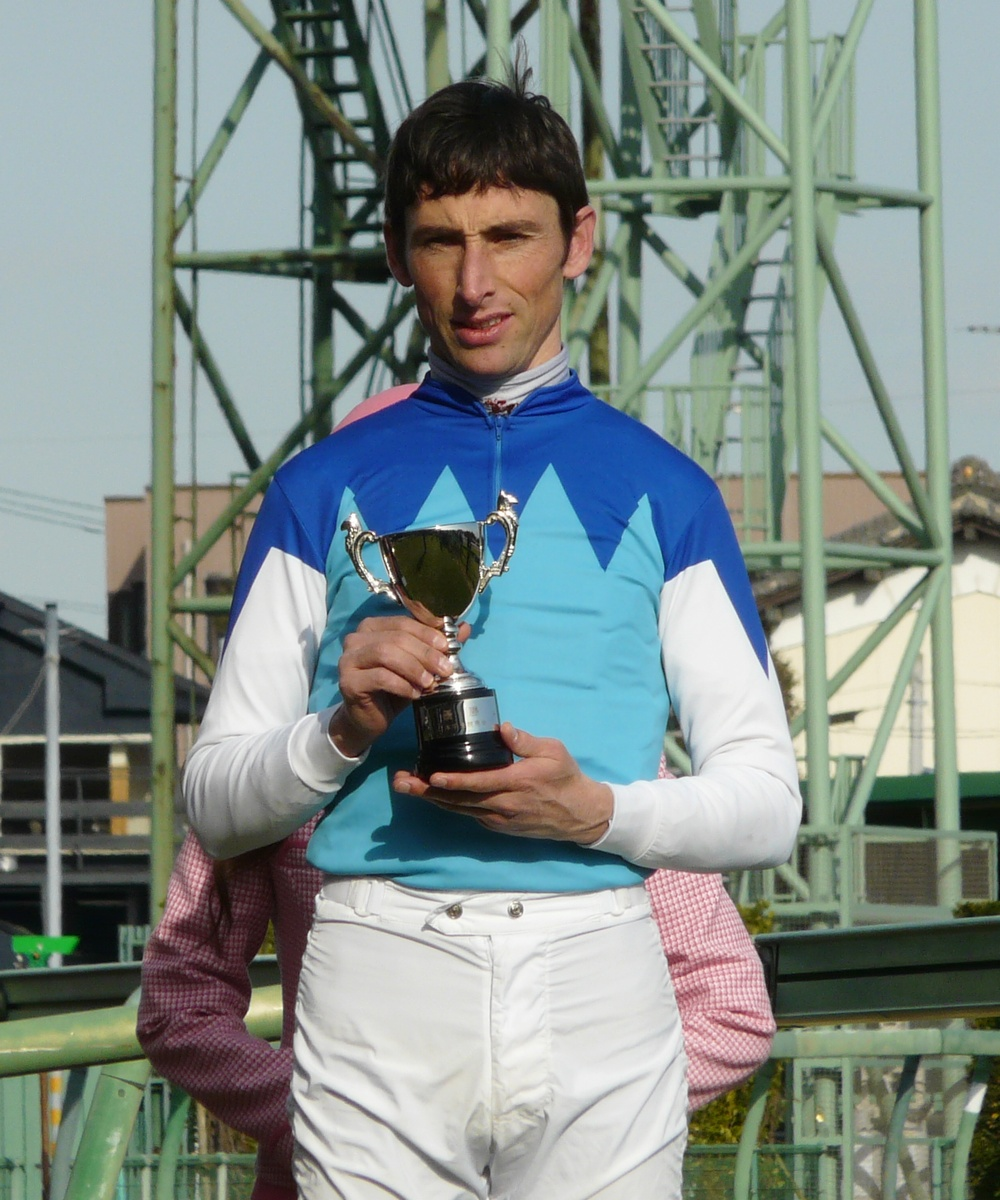
Ioritz Mendizabal

Ioritz Mendizabal (born 5 May 1974 in Oiartzun) is a Spanish Basque flat racing jockey, who is long-term based in France. He won his first race in 1990 and joined the stable of Jean-Claude Rouget the following year. Mendizabal is a four-time French flat racing Champion Jockey, winning the Cravache d'Or in 2004, 2008, 2009 and 2010. He is also active in Arabian horse racing, having won several group 1 races for Arabians.

Mendizabal comes from a family with no horse racing background, as his father works in a bank and his mother is a teacher. He lives in Pau.

== Major wins ==
France

- Criterium de Saint-Cloud – (1) – El Bodegon (2021)
- Prix du Jockey Club – (3) – Vision d'État (2008), Mishriff (2020), St Mark’s Basilica (2021)
- Prix de Diane – (1) – Joan of Arc (2021)
- Poule d'Essai des Poulains – (1) – St Mark’s Basilica (2021)
- Prix Ganay – (1) – Vision d'État (2009)
- Prix Jean Prat - (1) - Puchkine (2024)
- Prix de l'Opera – (1) – Lily Of The Valley (2010)
- Prix Saint-Alary – (2) – Ask for the Moon (2004), Germance (2006)
- Prix Jean Romanet – (1) – Audarya (2020)

United States

- Arlington Million – (1) – Spirit One (2008)

Germany

- Bayerisches Zuchtrennen – (1) – Lucky Lion (2014)
