= Prix des Réservoirs =

- Class: Group 3
- Location: Deauville Racecourse; Deauville, France
- Inaugurated: 1904
- Race type: Flat / Thoroughbred
- Sponsor: Darley
- Website: france-galop.com

Race information
- Distance: 1,600 metres (1 mile)
- Surface: Turf
- Track: Right-handed
- Qualification: Two-year-old fillies excluding Group 1 winners
- Weight: 55 kg Penalties; 3 kg for Group 2 winners 3 kg if two Group 3 wins 2 kg if one Group 3 win
- Purse: €80,000 (2024); 1st: €40,000

Prix des Réservoirs
2024
Gezora	Sandtrap	D'Ores Et Deja

Previous years
2023
Tulipa Chope	Aventure	Dollerina
2022
Fancy Me	Around Midnight	Angelaba
2021
Rosacea	Queen Trezy	Batz

2020-2011
2020
Rougir	Cirona	Sky Sister
2019
Pocket Square	Run Wild	Scripturale
2018
Cala Tarida	Montviette	Nova Sol
2017
With You	Altea	Prontamente
2016
Melesina	Turf Laurel	Onthemoonagain
2015
Trixia	Jemayel	Chartreuse
2014
Moonee Valley	Baltic Comtesse	Tigrilla
2013
Stellar Path	Kenzadargent	Waikika
2012
Tasaday	Cocktail Queen	Meri Shika
2011
Boldogsag	Mashoora	Rajastani

2010-2001
2010
Espirita	Footsteppy	Nova Step
2009
Barouda	Marie De Medici	Ayun Tara
2008
Article Rare	Ciel Rouge	Bufera
2007
Gagnoa	Gipson Dessert	African Rose
2006
Chinandega	Cicerole	Kahyasola
2005
Emily Bronte	Sanaya	Souvenance
2004
Songerie	Soignee	Ysoldina
2003
Via Milano	Colony Band	Agata
2002
High Praise	Welcome Millenium	Mystic Melody
2001
Summertime Legacy	Prudence Royale	Ana Marie

2000-1990
2000
Perfect Plum	Ascension	Linea D'Ombra
1999
Volvoreta	Blue Moon	Seattle Bay
1998
Comillas	Tycoon's Dolce	Summer Breeze
1997
Zalaiyka	Insight	Cyrillic
1996
Mousse Glacee	Queen Maud	Gazelle Royale
1995
Occupandiste	Raisonnable	Prevail
1994
Carling	Matiara	Collecta
1993
Three Angels	Papago	Valdara
1992
Corrazona	Dancienne	Borodislew
1991
Palomelle	Battle Quest	Danagroom
1990
Masslama	After The Sun	Satin Pointe

The Prix des Réservoirs is a Group 3 flat horse race in France open to two-year-old thoroughbred fillies. It is run at Deauville over a distance of 1,600 metres (about 1 mile), and it is scheduled to take place each year in October.

== History ==
The event was established in 1904, and it was originally held at Chantilly. Its title refers to four large reservoirs used for watering Chantilly's racetrack. It was initially open to two-year-olds of either gender and contested over 1,400 metres. It was shortened to 1,000 metres in 1906.

The race was transferred to Longchamp and increased to 1,100 metres in 1907. It was extended to 1,400 metres in 1911. It was abandoned throughout World War I, with no running from 1914 to 1918.

A new distance of 1,600 metres was introduced in 1931. Due to World War II, the event was cancelled in 1939 and 1940. It was staged at Le Tremblay in 1942, and was cancelled again in 1944.

The Prix des Réservoirs was cut to 1,400 metres in 1959. It was reduced to 1,300 metres in 1964. It was not run in 1966, and was extended to 1,500 metres in 1968.

The race reverted to 1,600 metres in 1970. It was restricted to fillies in 1972, and was given Group 3 status in 1976.

The Prix des Réservoirs moved to Deauville in 1996.

== Records ==
Leading jockey (5 wins):

- Roger Poincelet – Marveil (1948), Paracios (1949), Fort Belvedere (1955), Sanctus (1962), Bord a Bord (1964)

Leading trainer (5 wins):

- François Boutin – Suvannee (1975), Clear Picture (1977), Coussika (1981), Restiver (1985), Three Angels (1993)

Leading owner (3 wins):

- Marcel Boussac – Marveil (1948), Paracios (1949), Balkis (1951)
- HH Aga Khan IV – Maroun (1970), Masslama (1990), Zalaiyka (1997)
- Jacques Wertheimer – Belka (1982), Corrazona (1992), Occupandiste (1995)

== Winners since 1978 ==
Year	Winner	Jockey	Trainer	Owner	Time
1978	Nonoalca	Alain Lequeux	Aage Paus	Farzin Moshref
1979	Light of Realm	Maurice Philipperon	John Cunnington Jr.	Paul de Moussac
1980	Votre Altesse	Georges Doleuze	Mitri Saliba	Mahmoud Fustok
1981	Coussika	Guy Guignard	François Boutin	Ernst Wiget
1982	Belka	Freddy Head	Alec Head	Jacques Wertheimer
1983	Boreale	Freddy Head	Criquette Head	Haras d'Etreham
1984	Antartica	Éric Legrix	Patrick Biancone	Elena Palmieri
1985	Restiver	Cash Asmussen	François Boutin	Jean-Luc Lagardère
1986	Bint Alnasr	Cash Asmussen	André Fabre	Moufid Dabaghi
1987	Movieland	Gary W. Moore	Criquette Head	Ecurie Åland
1988	Good Example	Alain Lequeux	Maurice Zilber	Ecurie Fustok	1:43.00
1989	Golden Era	Norbert Jeanpierre	Pascal Bary	Ecurie Skymarc Farm	1:39.00
1990	Masslama	William Mongil	Alain de Royer-Dupré	Aga Khan IV	1:42.60
1991	Palomelle	Thierry Jarnet	Antonio Spanu	Patrick Rayez	1:46.60
1992	Corrazona	Olivier Doleuze	Criquette Head	Jacques Wertheimer	1:45.40
1993	Three Angels	Cash Asmussen	François Boutin	William Young	1:54.00
1994	Carling	Sylvain Guillot	Corine Barande-Barbe	Ecurie Delbart	1:42.90
1995	Occupandiste	Olivier Doleuze	Criquette Head	Jacques Wertheimer	1:38.00
1996	Mousse Glacee	Sylvain Guillot	Jean Lesbordes	Gary Biszantz	1:45.30
1997	Zalaiyka	Gérald Mossé	Alain de Royer-Dupré	Aga Khan IV	1:48.80
1998	Comillas	Gérald Mossé	Jean de Roualle	Georgiana Cabrero	1:53.90
1999	Volvoreta	Olivier Peslier	Carlos Lerner	Maria-Soledad Vidal	1:42.30
2000	Perfect Plum	George Duffield	Sir Mark Prescott	Sir Edmund Loder	1:50.30
2001	Summertime Legacy	Olivier Peslier	André Fabre	Maktoum Al Maktoum	1:51.00
2002	High Praise	Dominique Boeuf	John Gosden	Khalid Abdullah	1:49.20
2003	Via Milano	Dominique Boeuf	J. Laurent-Joye Rossi	Antoine Capozzi	1:41.40
2004	Songerie	Jean-Bernard Eyquem	Sir Mark Prescott	Kirsten Rausing	1:44.40
2005	Emily Brontë	Stéphane Pasquier	André Fabre	Sheikh Mohammed	1:45.20
2006	Chinandega	Stéphane Pasquier	Philippe Demercastel	Mrs P. Demercastel	1:43.80
2007	Gagnoa	Christophe Soumillon	Yves de Nicolay	Aleyrion Bloodstock Ltd	1:45.30
2008	Article Rare	Anthony Crastus	Élie Lellouche	Ecurie Wildenstein	1:48.70
2009	Barouda	Olivier Peslier	Jean-Marie Béguigné	Henri de la Chauvelais	1:44.60
2010	Espirita	Anthony Crastus	Élie Lellouche	Bruno Mettoudi	1:45.20
2011	Boldogsag	Christophe Lemaire	Pascal Bary	Mrs Georges Sandor	1:41.90
2012	Tasaday	Maxime Guyon	André Fabre	Godolphin	1:46.67
2013	Stellar Path	Gregory Benoist	Xavier Thomas-Demeaulte	Alidar Utemuratov	1:48.02
2014	Moonee Valley	Ioritz Mendizabal	Mario Hofer	Cocheese Bloodstock	1:46.76
2015	Trixia	Maxime Guyon	Frederic Rossi	Jean-Claude Seroul	1:48.03
2016	Melesina	Thierry Jarnet	Richard Fahey	Nick Bradley Racing	1:40.68
2017	With You	Aurélien Lemaitre	Freddy Head	George Strawbridge	1:44.76
2018	Cala Tarida	Gregory Benoist	Frederic Rossi	Marie-Joelle Goetschy	1:40.38
2019	Pocket Square	Mickael Barzalona	Roger Charlton	Khalid Abdullah	1:52.58
2020	Rougir	Mickael Barzalona	Cedric Rossi	Le Haras De La Gousserie	1:49.44
2021	Rosacea	Theo Bachelot	Stephane Wattel	Haras De La Perelle	1:48.34
2022	Fancy Me	Mickael Barzalona	Philippe Sogorb	Cotton House Bloodstock	1:45.21
2023	Tulipa Chope	Theo Bachelot	Stephane Wattel	Alain Jathiere	1:43.75
2024	Gezora	Aurélien Lemaitre	Nicolas Le Roch	Haras D'Etreham	1:51.51

== Earlier winners ==
- 1904: Sylvaire
- 1905: Auto da Fe
- 1906: Ivoire
- 1907: Le Nivernais
- 1908: Repasseur
- 1909: Diabolo / Valdahon *
- 1910: Horus
- 1911: Abel
- 1912: Gretry
- 1913: Oreste
- 1914–18: no race
- 1919: Americain
- 1920: Kez
- 1921: Awag
- 1922: Grand Aigle
- 1923: Baal
- 1924: First Edition
- 1925: Caprice
- 1926: Hernani
- 1927: Fanfan
- 1928: Rapid
- 1929: Elima
- 1930: Shikari
- 1931: Borodino
- 1932: Bassara
- 1933: Rosier
- 1934: Gazetti
- 1935: Fastnet
- 1936: Paix des Dames
- 1937: Flicker
- 1938: Cidre Mousseux
- 1939–40: no race
- 1941: Petitat
- 1942: Folle Nuit
- 1943: Laborde
- 1944: no race
- 1945:
- 1946: Imphal
- 1947: Royal Drake
- 1948: Marveil
- 1949: Paracios
- 1950: Simonetta
- 1951: Balkis
- 1952: Hattie
- 1953: Hathor
- 1954:
- 1955: Fort Belvedere
- 1956: Weeping Willow
- 1957: Laura Tudor
- 1958: Montrouge
- 1959: Notch
- 1960: Ploermel
- 1961: Ouananiche
- 1962: Sanctus
- 1963: Red Vagabonde
- 1964: Bord a Bord
- 1965: Barbare
- 1966: no race
- 1967:
- 1968: Bergano
- 1969: Double Splash
- 1970: Maroun
- 1971: Tom Playfair
- 1972: Begara
- 1973: Premiere Harde
- 1974: Dona Barod
- 1975: Suvannee
- 1976: Edinburgh
- 1977: Clear Picture

* The 1909 race was a dead-heat and has joint winners.

== See also ==
- List of French flat horse races
