= Audarya =

French-bred Thoroughbred racehorse

- Sire: Wootton Bassett
- Grandsire: Iffraaj
- Dam: Green Bananas
- Damsire: Green Tune
- Sex: Filly
- Foaled: 21 April 2016
- Country: France
- Colour: Bay
- Breeder: Haras d'Ecouves
- Owner: Alison Swinburn
- Trainer: James Fanshawe
- Record: 13: 5-4-1
- Earnings: £921,596

Major wins
- Prix Jean Romanet (2020); Breeders' Cup Filly & Mare Turf (2020)

Audarya (foaled 21 April 2016) is a French-bred British-trained Thoroughbred racehorse. After running second in her only start as a juvenile in 2018 she showed promising, but unremarkable form in the following year, winning two minor events and finishing second in a Listed race. As a young four-year-old in 2020 she was well beaten in her first two appearances but then made relentless progress, taking a minor handicap race in early August before moving up to Group 1 class to win the Prix Jean Romanet, finish third in the Prix de l'Opera and win the Breeders' Cup Filly & Mare Turf.

== Background ==
Audarya is a bay mare with no white markings bred in France by the Boucé, Orne-based Haras d'Ecouves a breeding farm owned by Francois Doumen. As a yearling in 2017 the filly was consigned to the Arqana Deauville October Yearlings Sale and was bought for €125,000 by Stroud Coleman Bloodstock. She entered the ownership of Alison Swinburn, and was sent into training with James Fanshawe at the Pegasus Stable in Newmarket, Suffolk.

She was from the fourth crop of foals sired by Wootton Bassett who won the Prix Jean-Luc Lagardère in 2010. Wootton Bassett's other foals have included Almanzor and Wooded. Audarya's dam Green Bananas showed durability, but little talent in her six seasons on the track, recording one minor win from 33 starts. Green Bananas' grand-dam Gigawatt was a full-sister to Jim And Tonic and a distant, female-line relative of the Irish Derby winner Prince Regent.

== Racing career ==
=== 2018: two-year-old season ===
On her racecourse debut Audarya started a 50/1 outsider for a novice race (for horses with no more than two previous wins) over one mile on the synthetic Polytrack surface at Kempton Park Racecourse on 16 November 2018. Ridden by George Wood she raced in mid-division before producing a strong late run but narrowly failed to catch the favourite Lady Adelaide finishing second by a nose.

=== 2019: three-year-old season ===
Audarya finished second in a maiden race over one mile at Nottingham Racecourse on her first appearance as a three-year-old on 10 May and then ran second again in a novice race three weeks later at Yarmouth Racecourse, beaten a length into second place by the odds-on favourite Velorum. Daniel Muscutt then took over as the filly's regular jockey and partnered her in her next seven races. On 21 June Audarya went off the 1/2 favourite for a novice race over ten furlongs at Redcar Racecourse and recorded her first victory as she went to the front three furlongs from the finish and won "easily" by almost four lengths from six opponents. In July she was matched against older fillies and mares as she contested a handicap race over ten furlongs at York Racecourse and came home fifth behind the five-year-old Ladies First. On 23 August Audarya was brought back in distance for a one-mile handicap at Goodwood Racecourse. Carrying 125 pounds and starting the 100/30 second favourite she produced a sustained run in the last quarter mile to gain the advantage in the closing stages and win by a length from the favourite Infanta Isabella. For her final race of the year the filly was sent to France and stepped up in class for the Listed Prix Coronation over 1600 metres at Saint-Cloud Racecourse on 18 September and finished second of the twelve runners, beaten two lengths by the winner Alzire after staying on well in the closing stages.

=== 2020: four-year-old season ===
The flat racing season in Britain and Ireland was restructured as a result of the COVID-19 outbreak with the racing being cancelled in March before resuming behind closed doors in June. On her seasonal debut Audarya finished eighth of the fourteen runners behind Nazeef in the Snowdrop Fillies' Stakes over one mile on Kempton's polytrack on 3 June making good progress in the closing stages. At Pontefract Racecourse in July she started 9/2 third choice in the betting for the Pipalong Stakes but ran disappointingly to come home in sixth place behind Romola, beaten more than eight lengths by the winner. On 2 August Audarya was dropped back in class for a handicap over ten furlongs on the Tapeta surface at Newcastle Racecourse in which she was assigned a weight of 140 pounds and started at odds of 12/1. After tracking the leaders she stayed on strongly to gain the advantage in the final strides and won by a short head from Prejudice. Three weeks later the filly was sent to France and moved up sharply in class to contest the Group 1 Prix Jean Romanet over 2000 metres on soft ground at Deauville Racecourse in which she was ridden by Ioritz Mendizabal. She started a 48/1 outsider in an eleven-runner field which included Nazeef (the odds-on favourite), Ambition (Prix Corrida), Soudania (Prix du Prince d'Orange), Nausha (Musidora Stakes), Bolleville (Silver Stakes) and Dariyma (Prix de la Pepiniere). Audaya raced close behind the leaders before moving up to take the lead 200 metres from the finish and held off a sustained challenge from Ambition to win by a neck with the pair finishing four lengths clear of the rest. After the race Fanshawe said "She's a filly I've always loved but we were going nowhere earlier this year. She was unlucky at Kempton and then I don't know what happened at Pontefract. It's a race we've always loved... but I must admit I've been walking my box the last two days wondering if I'd made a mistake."

On 4 October Audarya returned to France for the Group 1 Prix de l'Opera over 2000 metres on heavy ground at Longchamp Racecourse. Ridden by Mendizabal she made steady progress in the straight to finish third, beaten a short neck and three quarters of a length by Tarnawa and Alpine Star. For her final run of the season the filly was sent to the United States and started at odds of 12/1 for the Breeders' Cup Filly and Mare Turf over 9 1/2 furlongs at Keeneland on 7 November. Mendizabal was scheduled to take the ride but tested positive for COVID and was replaced by Pierre-Charles Boudot. The Diana Stakes winner Rushing Fall went off favourite, while the other contenders included Sistercharlie, Peaceful, Starship Jubilee, Mean Mary (New York Stakes), Terebellum (Dahlia Stakes), Cayenne Pepper (Blandford Stakes) and Harveys Lil Goil (Queen Elizabeth II Challenge Cup Stakes). Audarya tracked left soon after the start to settle on the inside rail as Cayenne Pepper set the early pace from Mean Mary. Rushing Fall took the lead in the straight but Audarya, having been switched to the outsite by Boudot, produced a sustained run, overtook the favourite in the final strides and won by a neck. Her winning time of 1:52.72 was a new track record. Fanshawe commented "She's a very good mover, and I think she goes on any ground... She is not an easy filly. She's a big filly, but she does hang on... she's very special and we're very happy to have her".

== Pedigree ==
Pedigree of Audarya (FR), bay mare 2016
Sire Wootton Bassett (GB) 2008	Iffraaj (GB); 2001	Zafonic (USA)	Gone West
Sire Wootton Bassett (GB) 2008	Iffraaj (GB); 2001	Zafonic (USA)	Zaizafon
Sire Wootton Bassett (GB) 2008	Iffraaj (GB); 2001	Pastorale	Nureyev (USA)
Sire Wootton Bassett (GB) 2008	Iffraaj (GB); 2001	Pastorale	Park Appeal (IRE)
Sire Wootton Bassett (GB) 2008	Balladonia (GB); 1996	Primo Dominie	Dominion
Sire Wootton Bassett (GB) 2008	Balladonia (GB); 1996	Primo Dominie	Swan Ann
Sire Wootton Bassett (GB) 2008	Balladonia (GB); 1996	Susquehanna Days (USA)	Chief's Crown
Sire Wootton Bassett (GB) 2008	Balladonia (GB); 1996	Susquehanna Days (USA)	Gliding By
Dam Green Bananas (FR) 2006	Green Tune (USA); 1991	Green Dancer	Nijinsky (CAN)
Dam Green Bananas (FR) 2006	Green Tune (USA); 1991	Green Dancer	Green Valley (FR)
Dam Green Bananas (FR) 2006	Green Tune (USA); 1991	Soundings	Mr Prospector
Dam Green Bananas (FR) 2006	Green Tune (USA); 1991	Soundings	Ocean's Answer (CAN)
Dam Green Bananas (FR) 2006	Anabaa Republic (FR); 2001	Anabaa (USA)	Danzig
Dam Green Bananas (FR) 2006	Anabaa Republic (FR); 2001	Anabaa (USA)	Balbonella (FR)
Dam Green Bananas (FR) 2006	Anabaa Republic (FR); 2001	Gigawatt	Double Bed
Dam Green Bananas (FR) 2006	Anabaa Republic (FR); 2001	Gigawatt	Jimka (Family: 1-l)
