= El Bodegon =

Irish Thoroughbred racehorse

- Racing silks of Nas Syndicate & A F O'Callaghan
- Sire: Kodiac
- Grandsire: Danehill
- Dam: Al Andalyya
- Damsire: Kingmambo
- Sex: Colt
- Foaled: 26 April 2019
- Country: Ireland
- Colour: Bay
- Breeder: Cecil & Martin McCracken
- Owner: Nas Syndicate & A F O'Callaghan
- Trainer: James Ferguson
- Record: 5: 3-1-1
- Earnings: £181,148

Major wins
- Prix de Conde (2021); Criterium de Saint-Cloud (2021)

El Bodegon (foaled 26 April 2019) is an Irish-bred, British-trained Thoroughbred racehorse. He was one of the best European two-year-olds in 2021 when he won three of his five races including the Prix de Conde and the Criterium de Saint-Cloud.

== Background ==
El Bodegon is a bay colt with a white star and snip and two white socks bred in Ireland by Cecil & Martin McCracken. As a yearling in October 2020 he was consigned to the Tattersalls sale and was bought for 70,000 guineas by the trainer John Ferguson. He entered the ownership of the Nas Syndicate & A F O'Callaghan and was taken into training by Ferguson at Newmarket, Suffolk.

He was sired by Kodiac, a sprinter who won four minor races from twenty starts and finished second in the Hackwood Stakes and fourth in the Prix Maurice de Gheest. Like his full-brother Invincible Spirit, he became a very successful breeding stallion, siring many major winners including Tiggy Wiggy, Fairyland and Hello Youmzain. El Bodegon's dam Al Andalyya showed little racing ability, failing to win in five attempts, but did better as a broodmare, producing the Caulfield Cup winner Best Solution. Her dam Kushnarenkovo was a daughter of the Park Hill Stakes winner Eva Luna, whose other foals included Brian Boru, Sea Moon and the dam of Workforce.

== Racing career ==
=== 2021: two-year-old season ===
El Bodegon began his racing career in a maiden race over six furlongs on soft ground at Windsor Racecourse on 5 July when he started at odds of 11/1 and finished second to Fast Response, beaten half a length by the winner. Later that month the colt started at 13/2 for a novice race (for horses with no more than two previous wins) over seven furlongs at Sandown Park, where he was ridden on his debut by Daniel Muscutt. Racing on heavy ground and in driving rain, El Bodegon raced in second place before taking the lead approaching the final furlong and drew away in the closing stages to win by two lengths.

For the rest of the season, El Bodegon was campaigned in France. Ryan Moore took the ride when the colt was stepped up in class and started a 16/1 outsider for the Group 3 Prix La Rochette over 1400 metres at Longchamp Racecourse on 5 September. In a change of tactics he led from the start but was overtaken in the last 50 metres and came home third behind Acer Alley and Making Moovies [sic], beaten half a length and a short neck. Twenty four days later El Bodegon was moved up in distance for the Group 3 Prix de Conde over 1800 metres at Chantilly Racecourse and went off the 7.9/1 fourth choice in a six-runner field. Ridden by Ioritz Mendizabal he raced just behind the leaders before overtaking the front-running True Testament 200 metres from the finish and "kept on well" to win by one and a quarter lengths.

Mendizabal was again in the saddle when El Bodegon started the 9.2/1 fifth choice in the betting for the Group 1 Criterium de Saint-Cloud over 2000 metres on heavy ground at Saint-Cloud Racecourse on 23 October. The Zetland Stakes winner Goldspur went off favourite, while the other seven runners included Unconquerable (second in the Zetland), Martel (Prix Tanerko) and Dreamflight (Prix Thomas Bryon). El Bodegon led from the start, drew clear of his opponents 300 metres from the finish and came home a length and a half clear of Stone Age despite being eased down by Mendizabal in the final strides. After the race Ferguson said "We love the horse and from his last win we planned this is where we wanted to go. But leading with a furlong to go wasn't really part of my planning... He's improved with every run and mentally as well, he takes his traveling very well... He's not overly big but there's a lot of presence about him and it's very exciting to wonder what we might have next year. I can't see him not improving. You have to aim high when you have a horse like this."

== Pedigree ==
Pedigree of El Bodegon (IRE), bay colt, 2019
Sire Kodiac (GB) 2001	Danehill (USA); 1986	Danzig	Northern Dancer (CAN)
Sire Kodiac (GB) 2001	Danehill (USA); 1986	Danzig	Pas de Nom
Sire Kodiac (GB) 2001	Danehill (USA); 1986	Razyana	His Majesty
Sire Kodiac (GB) 2001	Danehill (USA); 1986	Razyana	Spring Adieu (CAN)
Sire Kodiac (GB) 2001	Rafha (GB); 1987	Kris	Sharpen Up
Sire Kodiac (GB) 2001	Rafha (GB); 1987	Kris	Doubly Sure
Sire Kodiac (GB) 2001	Rafha (GB); 1987	Eljazzi (IRE)	Artaius (USA)
Sire Kodiac (GB) 2001	Rafha (GB); 1987	Eljazzi (IRE)	Border Bounty (GB)
Dam Al Andalyya (USA) 2008	Kingmambo (USA); 1990	Mr Prospector	Raise A Native
Dam Al Andalyya (USA) 2008	Kingmambo (USA); 1990	Mr Prospector	Gold Digger
Dam Al Andalyya (USA) 2008	Kingmambo (USA); 1990	Miesque	Nureyev
Dam Al Andalyya (USA) 2008	Kingmambo (USA); 1990	Miesque	Pasadoble
Dam Al Andalyya (USA) 2008	Kushnarenkovo (GB); 2003	Sadler's Wells (USA)	Northern Dancer (CAN)
Dam Al Andalyya (USA) 2008	Kushnarenkovo (GB); 2003	Sadler's Wells (USA)	Fairy Bridge
Dam Al Andalyya (USA) 2008	Kushnarenkovo (GB); 2003	Eva Luna (USA)	Alleged
Dam Al Andalyya (USA) 2008	Kushnarenkovo (GB); 2003	Eva Luna (USA)	Media Luna (GB) (Family: 14-c)

- El Bodegon was inbred 4 × 4 to Northern Dancer, meaning that this stallions appears twice in the fourth generation of his pedigree.
