= Zalaiyka =

French-bred Thoroughbred racehorse

- Sire: Royal Academy
- Grandsire: Nijinsky
- Dam: Zanadiyka
- Damsire: Akarad
- Sex: Mare
- Foaled: 13 April 1995
- Country: France
- Colour: Bay
- Breeder: Aga Khan IV
- Owner: Aga Khan IV
- Trainer: Alain de Royer-Dupré
- Record: 7: 4-1-0
- Earnings: £213,330

Major wins
- Prix des Réservoirs (1997); Prix de la Grotte (1998); Poule d'Essai des Pouliches (1998)

Zalaiyka (foaled 13 April 1995) was a French Thoroughbred racehorse and broodmare. After finishing fifth on her first appearance she won her two other races as a two-year-old including the Prix des Réservoirs. In the following year she took her winning run to four with victories in the Prix de la Grotte and the Poule d'Essai des Pouliches but was beaten in her two remaining starts and was retired at the end of the season. As a broodmare she had little success as a dam of winners.

== Background ==
Zalaiyka was a bay mare with a narrow white blaze bred in France by her owner, Aga Khan IV. She was sent into training with Alain de Royer-Dupré and was ridden in all of her races by Gerald Mosse.

His sire, Royal Academy won the July Cup at Newmarket and the Breeders' Cup Mile in 1990. At stud, his best winners included Oscar Schindler, Bullish Luck and Sleepytime. Zalaiyka's dam Zanadiyka was a successful racehorse who won three races and was placed four times at Group 3 level. Her great-grandmother Vareta was also the female-line ancestor of Dick Turpin, Zeddaan (Poule d'Essai des Poulains) and Ashkalani.

== Racing career ==
=== 1997: two-year-old season ===
On her racecourse debut, Zalaiyka finished fifth in a minor race over 1600 metres at Chantilly Racecourse on 2 September, four and a half lengths behind the winner Cyrillic. Seventeen day later she contested the Prix de la Fonterelle over the same course and distance and recorded her first success as he came home four lengths clear of Trophy Wife. The Prix des Réservoirs over 1600 metres on very soft ground at Deauville Racecourse on 21 October saw the filly stepped up to Group 3 class. Zalaiyka was restrained by Mosse in the early stages and turned into the straight fifth of the seven runners. She took the lead approaching the last 200 metres and despite swishing her tail in the closing stages she kept on to win by three quarters of a length from Insight, with Cyrillic two and a half lengths back in third.

=== 1998: three-year-old season ===
On 19 April Zalaiyka made her first appearance as a three-year-old and started the 2.5/1 second favourite behind the Criquette Head-trained Country Belle in the Group 3 Prix de la Grotte at Longchamp Racecourse. After tracking the favourite, Zalaiyka accelerated into the lead 200 metres from the finish and won by one and a half lengths from Miss Berbere. She was then moved up to Group 1 class for the Poule d'Essai des Pouliches over the same course and distance and was made the 1.2/1 favourite. Her thirteen opponents included Miss Berbere, Insight and Cyrillic as well as Kincara Palace (Killavullan Stakes), the Godolphin representative La Nuit Rose and the André Fabre-trained Astorg. Zalaiyka raced in second place before "streaking away" in the last 200 metres and came four lengths clear of Cortona, with La Nuit Rose a neck away in third.

For her first and only venture outside France, Zalaiyka was sent to England in June and started the 5/4 favourite for the Group 1 Coronation Stakes over one mile at Royal Ascot. After being held up in the early stages she made steady progress in the straight but was beaten into second place by Exclusive with Winona in third. Royer-Dupre, who was attempting to win his first race in Britain, said "She was changing her legs continuously and she found it a bit long in the end".

It was intended that Zalaiyka would run next in the Prix Jacques Le Marois at Deauville in August but was withdrawn when she was found to be suffering from a respiratory infection. After an absence of two and a half months the filly returned in the Prix du Moulin over 1600 metres at Longchamp on 6 September in which she was matched against male opposition and older horses for the first time. Starting the 1.8/1 second favourite she stayed on in the closing stages but never looked likely to win and finished fourth, eight lengths behind the winner Desert Prince.

== Breeding record ==
At the end of her racing career Zalaiyka was retired to become a broodmare for her owner's stud. She produced at least nine foals and two minor winners between 2002 and 2014:

- Zalafira, a bay filly, foaled in 2000, sired by Nashwan. Failed to win in three races.
- Zailawar, brown colt (later gelded), 2001, by Daylami. Won three races.
- Zalaiyma, bay filly, 2002, by Rainbow Quest. Won two races.
- Zalanaiya, bay filly, 2004, by Sinndar. Failed to win in two races.
- Zalama, bay filly, 2005, by Red Ransom. Unraced.
- Zalakar, colt (gelded), 2006, by Marju. Finished second in his only race.
- Zalwar, bay colt, 2008, by Selkirk. Unplaced in his only race.
- Zalzali, grey colt (gelded), 2012, by Dalakhani. Failed to win in fourteen races.
- Zallaja, bay filly, 2014, by Dalakhani. Failed to win in two races.

== Pedigree ==
Pedigree of Zalaiyka (FR), bay mare, 1995
Sire Royal Academy (USA) 1987	Nijinsky (CAN); 1967	Northern Dancer	Nearctic
Sire Royal Academy (USA) 1987	Nijinsky (CAN); 1967	Northern Dancer	Natalma (USA)
Sire Royal Academy (USA) 1987	Nijinsky (CAN); 1967	Flaming Page	Bull Page (USA)
Sire Royal Academy (USA) 1987	Nijinsky (CAN); 1967	Flaming Page	Flaring Top (USA)
Sire Royal Academy (USA) 1987	Crimson Saint; 1969	Crimson Satan	Spy Song
Sire Royal Academy (USA) 1987	Crimson Saint; 1969	Crimson Satan	Papila (ARG)
Sire Royal Academy (USA) 1987	Crimson Saint; 1969	Bolero Rose	Bolero
Sire Royal Academy (USA) 1987	Crimson Saint; 1969	Bolero Rose	First Rose
Dam Zanadaiyka (FR) 1988	Akarad; 1978	Labus	Busted (GB)
Dam Zanadaiyka (FR) 1988	Akarad; 1978	Labus	Cordovilla
Dam Zanadaiyka (FR) 1988	Akarad; 1978	Licata	Abdos
Dam Zanadaiyka (FR) 1988	Akarad; 1978	Licata	Gaia
Dam Zanadaiyka (FR) 1988	Zanata (IRE); 1982	African Sky (GB)	Sing Sing
Dam Zanadaiyka (FR) 1988	Zanata (IRE); 1982	African Sky (GB)	Sweet Caroline
Dam Zanadaiyka (FR) 1988	Zanata (IRE); 1982	Zaheen	Silver Shark (GB)
Dam Zanadaiyka (FR) 1988	Zanata (IRE); 1982	Zaheen	Vareta (FR) (Family: 11-g)
