= Teona =

Irish-bred racehorse

- Sire: Sea The Stars
- Grandsire: Cape Cross
- Dam: Ambivalent
- Damsire: Authorized
- Sex: Filly
- Foaled: 13 March 2018
- Country: Ireland
- Color: Bay
- Breeder: Rabbah Bloodstock
- Owner: Ali Saeed
- Trainer: Roger Varian
- Record: 6: 3-1-1
- Earnings: £341,291

Major wins
- August Stakes (2021); Prix Vermeille (2021)

Teona (foaled 13 March 2018) is an Irish-bred, British-trained Thoroughbred racehorse. She showed promise as a two-year-old in 2020 when she won the second of her two races by nine lengths. In the following spring she ran disappointingly in the Musidora Stakes and the Epsom Oaks but developed into a top-class middle distance performer, winning the August Stakes and the Prix Vermeille.

== Background ==
Teona is a bay filly with a white stripe bred in Ireland by Rabbah Bloodstock. As a yearling in October 2019 she was consigned to the Tattersalls sales and was bought for 280,000 guineas by Hugo Merry Bloodstock. She entered the ownership of Ali Saeed, and was sent into training with Roger Varian at Newmarket, Suffolk.

She was from the eighth crop of foals sired by Sea the Stars who won the 2000 Guineas, Epsom Derby and Prix de l'Arc de Triomphe in 2009. His other major winners have included Baaeed, Harzand, Taghrooda, Stradivarius, Sea of Class and Sea The Moon. Teona's dam Ambivalent was a top-class racemare whose wins included the Pretty Polly Stakes and the Middleton Stakes. She was a half-sister to the dam of the Prix de l'Abbaye winner Total Gallery and, as a descendant of the broodmare Meinhart, she was also distantly related to the Grand National winner Lord Gyllene.

== Racing career ==
=== 2020: two-year-old season ===
Teona made her track debut in a one-mile maiden race on the synthetic Tapeta surface at Newcastle Racecourse on 30 October when she started 2/1 favourite and finished second, beaten a length by the winner Sea Empress. On 19 November at the same track she went off the 1/3 favourite for a maiden over ten furlongs and recorded her first success as she took the lead entering the last quarter mile and drew away to win "easily" by nine lengths from the colt Kondo Isami.

=== 2021: three-year-old season ===
For her first appearance as a three-year-old, Teona was stepped up in class to contest the Group 3 Musidora Stakes (a major trial for the Epsom Oaks) over 10 1/2 furlongs at York Racecourse on 12 May when she was ridden by Andrea Atzeni and started the 15/8 second choice in the betting. After becoming agitated in the starting stalls she fought her jockey's attempts to restrain her and made little impression in the closing stages, coming home third behind Snowfall and the favourite Noon Star. In the Oaks on 4 June the filly started at odds of 12/1 but never looked likely to win and finished tenth behind Snowfall, beaten more than twenty-seven lengths by the winner.

After a break of fourteen weeks, Teona returned to the track on 28 August, when she was matched against colts and older horses in the Listed August Stakes over 11 1/2 furlongs at Windsor Racecourse. She started the 3/1 joint-favourite alongside the four-year-old filly Domino Darling in an eight-runner field which also included the Canadian International Stakes winner Desert Encounter. Ridden by Ray Dawson Teona tracked the leaders before taking the lead two furlongs from the finish and kept on well to win by 3 1/4 lengths from Desert Encounter. After the race Roger Varian said "We had big hopes of her in the spring and it didn’t go her way in the Oaks trial or the Oaks, so we’ve given her time. Hopefully this is just the start for her now – it’s nice to get a Listed win and hopefully she can build on that now."

Two weeks after her win at Windsor, Teona returned to Group 1 class when she was sent to France to contest the Prix Vermeille over 2400 metres at Longchamp Racecourse and started a 17.9/1 outsider in a seven-runner field. Snowfall started the 1/5 favourite while the other contenders included Incarville, Joan of Arc and Philomene (Prix Penelope). Ridden by Olivier Peslier, Teona tracked the front-running La Joconde before gaining the advantage 200 metres from the finish and stayed on well to win beat Snowfall by 1 1/2 lengths. Varian commented "I think she's very good, I don't think it's a fluke result. Whether Snowfall ran up to her very best, you could argue that she didn't. But the Oaks was not our race, she couldn't handle the conditions and ours is a very good filly. I've always said that and that's why it's so satisfying that it's come through today."

Teona was expected to run in the Prix de l'Arc de Triomphe but was withdrawn on account of the soft ground.

== Pedigree ==
Pedigree of Teona (GB), bay filly, 2018
Sire Sea the Stars (IRE) 2006	Cape Cross (IRE); 1994	Green Desert (USA)	Danzig
Sire Sea the Stars (IRE) 2006	Cape Cross (IRE); 1994	Green Desert (USA)	Foreign Courier
Sire Sea the Stars (IRE) 2006	Cape Cross (IRE); 1994	Park Appeal	Ahonoora (GB)
Sire Sea the Stars (IRE) 2006	Cape Cross (IRE); 1994	Park Appeal	Balidaress
Sire Sea the Stars (IRE) 2006	Urban Sea (USA); 1989	Miswaki	Mr Prospector
Sire Sea the Stars (IRE) 2006	Urban Sea (USA); 1989	Miswaki	Hopespringseternal
Sire Sea the Stars (IRE) 2006	Urban Sea (USA); 1989	Allegretta (GB)	Lombard (GER)
Sire Sea the Stars (IRE) 2006	Urban Sea (USA); 1989	Allegretta (GB)	Anatevka (GER)
Dam Ambivalent (IRE) 2009	Authorized (IRE); 2004	Montjeu	Sadler's Wells (USA)
Dam Ambivalent (IRE) 2009	Authorized (IRE); 2004	Montjeu	Floripedes (FR)
Dam Ambivalent (IRE) 2009	Authorized (IRE); 2004	Funsie (FR)	Saumarez (GB)
Dam Ambivalent (IRE) 2009	Authorized (IRE); 2004	Funsie (FR)	Vallee Dansante (USA)
Dam Ambivalent (IRE) 2009	Darrery (GB); 1990	Darshaan	Shirley Heights
Dam Ambivalent (IRE) 2009	Darrery (GB); 1990	Darshaan	Delsy (FR)
Dam Ambivalent (IRE) 2009	Darrery (GB); 1990	Flamenco (USA)	Dance Spell
Dam Ambivalent (IRE) 2009	Darrery (GB); 1990	Flamenco (USA)	Santiago Sweetie (Family: 1-j)
