= Prix de la Grotte =

Flat horse race in France

- Class: Group 3
- Location: Longchamp Racecourse; Paris, France
- Inaugurated: 1889
- Race type: Flat / Thoroughbred
- Website: france-galop.com

Race information
- Distance: 1,600 metres (1 mile)
- Surface: Turf
- Track: Right-handed
- Qualification: Three-year-old fillies
- Weight: 57 kg
- Purse: €80,000 (2020); 1st: €40,000

Prix de la Grotte
2025
Zarigana	Shes Perfect	Godspeed

Previous years
2024
Candala	Minoushka	Tulipa Chope
2023
Blue Rose Cen	Lindy	Palerma
2022
Rosacea	Daisy Maisy	Mangoustine
2021
Cirona	Silvestri	King's Harlequin

2020-2011
2020
Tropbeau	Dream And Do	Tickle Me Green
2019
Castle Lady	Imperial Charm	Epistrophy
2018
Musis Amica	Sea Prose	Latita
2017
Senga	La Sardane	Lady Frankel
2016
Qemah	Kenriya	Antonoe
2015
Mexican Gold	Penorka	Vedouma
2014
Lesstalk In Paris	Straight Thinking	Indonesienne
2013
Kenhope	Tasaday	Topaze Blanche
2012
Beauty Parlour	Woven Lace	Miss Carmie
2011
Golden Lilac	Mixed Intention	Whip And Win

2010-2001
2010
Anna Salai	Gotlandia	Rosanara
2009
Tamazirte	Soneva	Proportional
2008
Zarkava	Conference Call	Lessing
2007
Darjina	Missvinski	Chinandega
2006
Daltaya	Quiet Royal	Price Tag
2005
Divine Proportions	Ysoldina	Gorella
2004
Grey Lilas	Petit Calva	Denebola
2003
Maiden Tower	Fidelio's Miracle	Welcome Millenium
2002
Sophisticat	Dublino	Firth Of Lorne
2001
Quarter Note	Amonita	Born Something

2000-1991
2000
Lady Of Chad	Texalina	Gold Round
1999
Venize	Visionnaire	Juvenia
1998
Zalaiyka	Miss Berbere	Country Belle
1997
Always Loyal	Mousse Glacee	Green Lady
1996
Shake The Yoke	Raisonnable	Miss Tahiti
1995
Matiara	Shaanxi	Carling
1994
Flagbird	East Of The Moon	Belle Argentine
1993
Baya	Gold Splash	Hawk Beauty
1992
Absurde	Guislaine	Verveine
1991
Danseuse Du Soir	La Carene	Polemic

1990-1988
1990
Houseproud	Mackla	Sous Entendu
1989
Keniant	Irish Order	Charara
1988
Silver Lane	Sacre Look	Harmless Albatross

The Prix de la Grotte is a Group 3 flat horse race open to three-year-old thoroughbred fillies in France. It is run over a distance of 1,600 metres (about 1 mile) at Longchamp in April.

== History ==
The event was established in 1889 and was initially open to colts and fillies aged three or older. Its format varied during the early part of its history.

The modern version of the Prix de la Grotte was introduced in 1952. From this point, it was restricted to three-year-old fillies and was initially contested over 1,600 metres. It was designed to serve as a trial for the Poule d'Essai des Pouliches.

The race's distance was modified several times during the 1960s. It was run over 1,400 metres (1965), 1,300 metres (1966) and 1,500 metres (1967) before reverting to 1,600 metres in 1968.

Several modern Prix de la Grotte winners have won the Poule d'Essai des Pouliches. The first was Apollonia in 1956; the most recent was Zarigana in 2025.

== Records ==
Leading jockey since 1952 (7 wins):

- Yves Saint-Martin – La Sega (1962), Felicia (1963), Mirna (1964), Tonnera (1966), Pola Bella (1968), Koblenza (1969), Captive Island (1985)

Leading trainer since 1952 (8 wins):

- André Fabre – Houseproud (1990), Baya (1993), Flagbird (1994), Grey Lilas (2004), Anna Silai (2010), Golden Lilac (2011), Mexican Gold (2015), Tropbeau (2020)

Leading owner since 1952 (5 wins):

- Nelson Bunker Hunt – Gazala (1967), Pampered Miss (1970), Dahlia (1973), Nobiliary (1975), Hartebeest (1977)

== Winners since 1980 ==
Year	Winner	Jockey	Trainer	Owner	Time
1980	Aryenne	Maurice Philipperon	John Fellows	D. G. Volkert	1:39.70
1981	Tropicaro	Alain Lequeux	Maurice Zilber	Benjamin Coates
1982	River Lady	Lester Piggott	François Boutin	Robert Sangster
1983	Mysterieuse Etoile	Alfred Gibert	Mitri Saliba	Mahmoud Fustok
1984	Treizieme	Lester Piggott	Maurice Zilber	Thomas Tatham
1985	Captive Island (Note: New Bruce and Silvermine finished first and second in 1985, but the race was awarded to the third-placed horse after a stewards' inquiry)	Yves Saint-Martin	Robert Collet	Robert Sangster
1986	Northern Premier	Cash Asmussen	Georges Mikhalidès	Mahmoud Fustok
1987	Sakura Reiko	Tony Cruz	Patrick Biancone	Enshoku Zen	1:39.60
1988	Silver Lane	Cash Asmussen	Maurice Zilber	Mahmoud Fustok	1:37.90
1989	Keniant	Gary W. Moore	Patrick Biancone	Daniel Wildenstein	1:44.80
1990	Houseproud	Pat Eddery	André Fabre	Khalid Abdullah	1:47.30
1991	Danseuse du Soir	Dominique Boeuf	Élie Lellouche	Daniel Wildenstein	1:46.20
1992	Absurde	Freddy Head	François Boutin	Chryss Goulandris	1:41.90
1993	Baya	Thierry Jarnet	André Fabre	Sheikh Mohammed	1:45.10
1994	Flagbird	Thierry Jarnet	André Fabre	Sheikh Mohammed	1:38.00
1995	Matiara	Freddy Head	Criquette Head	Ecurie Aland	1:48.40
1996	Shake The Yoke	Dominique Boeuf	Élie Lellouche	Serge Brunswick	1:36.70
1997	Always Loyal	Freddy Head	Criquette Head	Maktoum Al Maktoum	1:41.30
1998	Zalaiyka	Gérald Mossé	Alain de Royer-Dupré	HH Aga Khan IV	1:50.90
1999	Venize	Olivier Peslier	Robert Collet	Arne Larsson	1:47.20
2000	Lady of Chad	Gérald Mossé	Richard Gibson	John Martin	1:51.50
2001	Quarter Note	Yutaka Take	Henri-Alex Pantall	Sheikh Mohammed	1:50.30
2002	Sophisticat	Jamie Spencer	Aidan O'Brien	Magnier / Tabor	1:40.40
2003	Maiden Tower	Christophe Lemaire	Henri-Alex Pantall	Sheikh Mohammed	1:48.80
2004	Grey Lilas	Gary Stevens	André Fabre	Gestüt Ammerland	1:38.40
2005	Divine Proportions	Christophe Lemaire	Pascal Bary	Niarchos Family	1:42.10
2006	Daltaya	Christophe Soumillon	Alain de Royer-Dupré	HH Aga Khan IV	1:38.30
2007	Darjina	Christophe Soumillon	Alain de Royer-Dupré	Zahra Aga Khan	1:38.40
2008	Zarkava	Christophe Soumillon	Alain de Royer-Dupré	HH Aga Khan IV	1:44.70
2009	Tamazirte	Christophe Lemaire	Jean-Claude Rouget	Vallée Martigny / Rabineau	1:42.78
2010	Anna Salai	Maxime Guyon	André Fabre	Godolphin	1:38.33
2011	Golden Lilac	Maxime Guyon	André Fabre	Gestüt Ammerland	1:43.62
2012	Beauty Parlour	Christophe Soumillon	Élie Lellouche	Ecurie Wildenstein	1:37.82
2013	Kenhope	Thierry Jarnet	Henri-Alex Pantall	Guy Pariente	1:50.73
2014	Lesstalk In Paris	Christophe Soumillon	Jean-Claude Rouget	SARL	1:50.64
2015	Mexican Gold	Vincent Cheminaud	André Fabre	Khalid Abdullah	1:37.98
2016	Qemah (Note: The 2016 and 2017 races took place at Chantilly while Longchamp was closed for redevelopment)	Gregory Benoist	Jean-Claude Rouget	Al Shaqab Racing	1:38.14
2017	Senga	Stéphane Pasquier	Pascal Bary	Flaxman Stables Ireland	1:40.30
2018	Musis Amica	Mickael Barzalona	André Fabre	Godolphin	1:46.85
2019	Castle Lady	Mickael Barzalona	Henri-Alex Pantall	Godolphin	1:38.39
2020	Tropbeau	Mickael Barzalona	André Fabre	Lady Bamford	1:40.78
2021	Cirona	Maxime Guyon	Christophe Ferland	Ecurie Waldeck	1:43.71
2022	Rosacea	Mickael Barzalona	Stephane Wattel	Haras De La Perelle	1:38.58
2023	Blue Rose Cen	Aurélien Lemaitre	Christopher Head	Yeguada Centurion SL	1:45.07
2024	Candala	Mickael Barzalona	Francis-Henri Graffard	HH Aga Khan IV	1:44.21
2025	Zarigana	Mickael Barzalona	Francis-Henri Graffard	Exors of HH Aga Khan IV	1:40.60
2026	Evolutionist	Shane Foley	Karl Burke	Forz Europe Ltd	1:38.19

== Earlier winners ==
- 1952: Devinette
- 1954: Baghicheh
- 1955: Myriade
- 1956: Apollonia
- 1957: Epine Doree
- 1958: Reluisante
- 1959: Fiorenza
- 1960: Sly Pola
- 1961: Mopsy
- 1962: La Sega
- 1963: Felicia
- 1964: Mirna
- 1965: Clear River
- 1966: Tonnera
- 1967: Gazala
- 1968: Pola Bella
- 1969: Koblenza
- 1970: Pampered Miss
- 1971: Bold Fascinator
- 1972: If
- 1973: Dahlia
- 1974: Paddy's Princess
- 1975: Nobiliary
- 1976: Riverqueen
- 1977: Hartebeest
- 1978: Tayyara
- 1979: Nonoalca

== See also ==
- List of French flat horse races
