= Aurélien Lemaitre =

French jockey (born 1989)

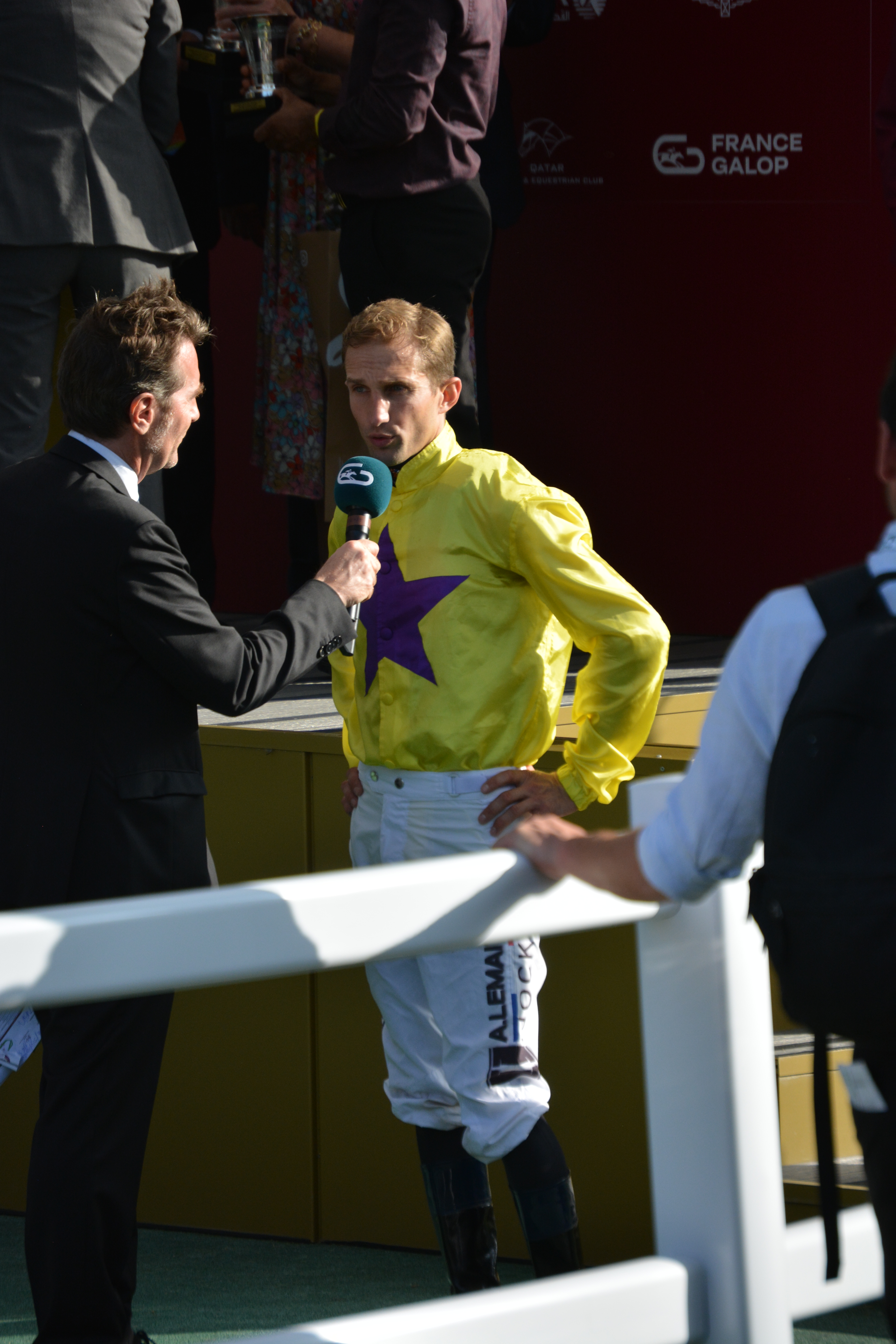
- Lemaitre in 2023

Personal information
- Nationality: French
- Born: July 3, 1989 (age 37) France
- Occupation: Jockey
- Height: 168 cm (5 ft 6 in)
- Weight: 52 kg (115 lb)

Horse racing career
- Sport: Horse racing

Aurélien Lemaitre (born 3 July 1989) is a French flat racing jockey. He joined the horse racing school AFASEC in Gouvieux near Chantilly aged 14, inspired by his father who had horses as his hobby. Lemaitre apprenticed for trainer Freddy Head and made his debut in June 2005, aged 16, and won his first race year later in July 2006. He has since achieved over 700 wins, including more than 35 on the Group level, winning his first Group race in Group 3 Prix du Palais-Royal in 2015. He was Freddy Head's stable jockey until Head's retirement from training at the end of 2022, after which he switched to being a stable jockey for his son Christopher Head. Lemaitre spent several winters in the United States as a work rider for Julio Canani and Bill Mott.

== Major wins ==
France

- Prix Rothschild - (1) - With You (2018)
- Prix du Cadran - (1) - Call The Wind (2018)
- Prix Marcel Boussac - (1) - Blue Rose Cen (2022)
- Poule d'Essai des Pouliches - (1) - Blue Rose Cen (2023)
- Prix de Diane - (1) - Blue Rose Cen (2023)
- Prix de Royallieu - (1) - Sea Silk Road (2023)
- Prix de l'Opera - (1) - Blue Rose Cen (2023)
- Prix de la Forêt - (2) - Ramatuelle (2024), Maranoa Charlie (2025)

United Kingdom

- Queen Elizabeth II Stakes - (1) - Big Rock (2023)
