= Almanzor (horse) =

French Thoroughbred racehorse

- Racing silks of Antonio Caro
- Sire: Wootton Bassett
- Grandsire: Iffraaj
- Dam: Darkova
- Damsire: Maria's Mon
- Sex: Stallion
- Foaled: 11 March 2013
- Country: France
- Colour: Bay
- Breeder: Haras d'Etreham
- Owner: Ecurie Antonio Caro & Gerard Augustin-Normand
- Trainer: Jean-Claude Rouget
- Record: 11: 8-0-1
- Earnings: £2,135,990

Major wins
- Grand Critérium de Bordeaux (2015); Prix de Guiche (2016); Prix du Jockey Club (2016); Prix Guillaume d'Ornano (2016); Irish Champion Stakes (2016); Champion Stakes (2016)

Awards
- Cartier Champion Three-year-old Colt (2016); Top-rated European horse (2016)

Almanzor (foaled 11 March 2013) is a French Thoroughbred racehorse. As a two-year-old he won his first three races on provincial French tracks but was well-beaten when moved up in class for the Critérium International. In the following year he finished third on his debut but later emerged as the best horse of his generation in Europe with five consecutive victories, taking the Prix de Guiche, Prix du Jockey Club, Prix Guillaume d'Ornano, Irish Champion Stakes and Champion Stakes. He stayed in training as a four-year-old but was affected by a virus and subsequent physical setback and was retired after making an unsuccessful return to racing in August 2017.

== Background ==
Almanzor is a bay horse with no white markings bred in Normandy by the Haras d'Etreham. In August 2014 the yearling colt was offered for sale at Deauville and bought for €100,000 by the leading French trainer Jean-Claude Rouget. During his racing career he has been trained by Rouget and owned in partnership by Ecurie Antonio Caro and Gerard Augustin-Normand.

He was from the first crop of foals sired by Wootton Bassett who won the Prix Jean-Luc Lagardère in 2010. Wootton Bassett's other foals have included Wooded and Ausharya. Almanzor's dam Darkova never ran in a race but was a descendant of the French broodmare Darazina, the female-line ancestor of many good winners including Darsi, Darjina and Daryaba (Prix de Diane)

== Racing career ==
=== 2015: two-year-old season ===
Almanzor made his racecourse debut in a 1400-metre contest at La Teste-de-Buch on 28 July 2015. Ridden by Jean-Bernard Eyquem he won by one and a half lengths from Dream Dy. On 21 August he followed up with a three length win in a minor race over 1600 metres at Clairefontaine in which he was ridden by Christophe Soumillon. On 8 October the colt was moved up in class for the Listed Grand Critérium de Bordeaux and started odds-on favourite against five opponents. Ridden by Eyquem he won by three lengths from his stablemate Camp Courage. Almanzor's final appearance of 2015 saw him stepped up to Group One level for the Critérium International over 1400 metres on very soft ground at Saint-Cloud Racecourse on 1 November. He appeared outpaced in the closing stages and finished seventh of the eight runners behind the Aidan O'Brien-trained Johannes Vermeer.

=== 2016: three-year-old season ===
On his three-year-old debut Almanzor was partnered by Eyquem in the Group Three Prix de Fontainebleau over 1600 metres on 29 April and stayed on to finish third behind Dicton and Taareef, beaten three quarters of a length by the winner. The race was run at Chantilly as Longchamp Racecourse was closed for redevelopment and refurbishment throughout 2016. Soumillon took over when the colt started odds-on favourite for the Prix de Guiche (a trial race for the Prix du Jockey Club) over 1800 metres at the same track eleven days later. Almanzor led from the start, went clear of his three opponents in the straight and won "easily" by two lengths from the André Fabre-trained Floodlight.

In the Prix du Jockey Club at Chantilly on 5 June Almanzor was ridden by Eyquem and started a 20/1 outsider in a sixteen-runner field. The British colt Foundation (winner of the Royal Lodge Stakes) started favourite ahead of the Rouget stable's main hope Mekhtaal (Prix Hocquart) with the other fancied runners including Imperial Aviator, Robin of Navan (Critérium de Saint-Cloud), Zarak (beaten favourite in the Poule d'Essai des Poulains) and Dicton. Almanzor raced towards the middle of the field before making progress 400 metres from the finish. He took the lead 200 metres out and won by one and a half lengths from Zarak with Dicton in third. After the race Rouget said "I've always liked him and he was well drawn, but you couldn't say before he was among the favorites. To win races like these is why we all get up every morning".

After a break of over ten weeks Almaznor reappeared in the Prix Guillaume d'Ornano at Deauville Racecourse on 15 August. Ridden by Eyquem he started the 3/1 third favourite behind Ultra (Prix Jean-Luc Lagardère) and Zarak, whilst the other six runners included Taareef, Heshem (Prix Eugène Adam) and Royal Artillery (Rose of Lancaster Stakes). He raced towards the rear of the field before making a strong late challenge, taking the lead 70 metres out and winning by a length from Zarak.

On 10 September Almanzor was sent to Ireland and was matched against older horses for the first time when he contested the Irish Champion Stakes over ten furlongs at Leopardstown Racecourse. Ridden by Soumillon he started 7/1 joint third favourite behind Harzand and Minding in a twelve-runner field which also included Found, New Bay, Highland Reel and Hawkbill. After racing towards the rear of the field he was switched to the outside and began to make rapid progress in the straight. He took second place inside the final furlong and overtook Found 100 yards from the finish to win by three quarters of a length. After the race Soumillon said "It was a great feeling. It was a very high-rated race with a lot of champions. We know how good he is but you never know when you go overseas for the first time. He was very relaxed today and when I asked him to quicken he gave me a great turn of foot and won like a champion".

Almanzor bypassed the Prix de l'Arc de Triomphe to contest the Champion Stakes over ten furlongs at Ascot Racecourse on 14 October. He started favourite ahead of the Arc winner Found, whilst the other runners included Jack Hobbs, The Grey Gatsby, US Army Ranger and My Dream Boat (Prince of Wales's Stakes). After tracking the leaders on the inside rail he was switched to the left to make his challenge in the straight. He overtook The Grey Gatsby approaching the final furlong and went clear of the field to win "decisively" by two lengths from Found.

=== 2017: four-year-old season ===
In 2017 many of the horses in Rouget's stable were affected by illness and Almanzor was unable to race until August. On his reappearance he started odds-on favourite for the Prix Gontaut-Biron at Deauville but finished fifth of the six runners. A week later it was announced that he would not race again. A spokesman for his owner said "It was not an easy decision to take, but everyone was in 100% agreement that it was the right thing to do. The plan was to go to the Arc, but after his performance last week we could not have gone there expecting to win. He was a very good horse and was the best three-year-old in Europe. He has done everything he needs to do on a racecourse".

== Assessment and awards ==
On 8 November 2016 Almanzor was named Champion three-year-old colt at the Cartier Racing Awards. He was also nominated for the Cartier Horse of the Year award but lost out to Minding.

In the 2016 edition of the World's Best Racehorse Rankings Almanzor was given a rating of 129, making him the 4th best racehorse in the world, the second-best three-year-old colt and the top-rated horse trained in Europe.

== Stud career ==
Almanzor commenced service as a stallion at Cambridge Stud, New Zealand in 2018.

=== Notable progeny ===
c = colt, f = filly, g = gelding

Foaled	Name	Sex	Dam	Dam Sire	Major Wins
2019	Manzoice	c	Choice	Mastercraftsman (Ire)	Victoria Derby (2022)
2019	Trav	g	Royal Sav	Savabeel	Auckland Cup (2025)
2020	Circle of Fire	c	Fiery Sunset	Galileo	Sydney Cup (2024)
2020	First Five	g	Payette	Volkraad	Telegraph Handicap (2026)
2020	Manzor Blue	m	Turquoise Coast	Zabeel	Wellington Cup (2026)
2022	Gezora	f	Germance (USA)	Silver Hawk (USA)	Prix de Diane (2025); Breeders' Cup Filly & Mare Turf (2025)

== Pedigree ==
Pedigree of Almanzor (FR), bay colt 2013
Sire Wootton Bassett (GB) 2008	Iffraaj (GB); 2001	Zafonic (USA)	Gone West
Sire Wootton Bassett (GB) 2008	Iffraaj (GB); 2001	Zafonic (USA)	Zaizafon
Sire Wootton Bassett (GB) 2008	Iffraaj (GB); 2001	Pastorale	Nureyev (USA)
Sire Wootton Bassett (GB) 2008	Iffraaj (GB); 2001	Pastorale	Park Appeal (IRE)
Sire Wootton Bassett (GB) 2008	Balladonia (GB); 1996	Primo Dominie	Dominion
Sire Wootton Bassett (GB) 2008	Balladonia (GB); 1996	Primo Dominie	Swan Ann
Sire Wootton Bassett (GB) 2008	Balladonia (GB); 1996	Susquehanna Days (USA)	Chief's Crown
Sire Wootton Bassett (GB) 2008	Balladonia (GB); 1996	Susquehanna Days (USA)	Gliding By
Dam Darkova (USA) 2008	Maria's Mon (USA); 1993	Wavering Monarch	Majestic Light
Dam Darkova (USA) 2008	Maria's Mon (USA); 1993	Wavering Monarch	Uncommitted
Dam Darkova (USA) 2008	Maria's Mon (USA); 1993	Caralotta Maria	Caro (IRE)
Dam Darkova (USA) 2008	Maria's Mon (USA); 1993	Caralotta Maria	Water Malone
Dam Darkova (USA) 2008	Darkara (IRE); 2001	Halling (USA)	Diesis (GB)
Dam Darkova (USA) 2008	Darkara (IRE); 2001	Halling (USA)	Dance Machine (GB)
Dam Darkova (USA) 2008	Darkara (IRE); 2001	Daralbayda	Doyoun
Dam Darkova (USA) 2008	Darkara (IRE); 2001	Daralbayda	Daralinha (USA) (Family: 1-e)
