= Francis-Henri Graffard =

French racehorse trainer (born 1977)

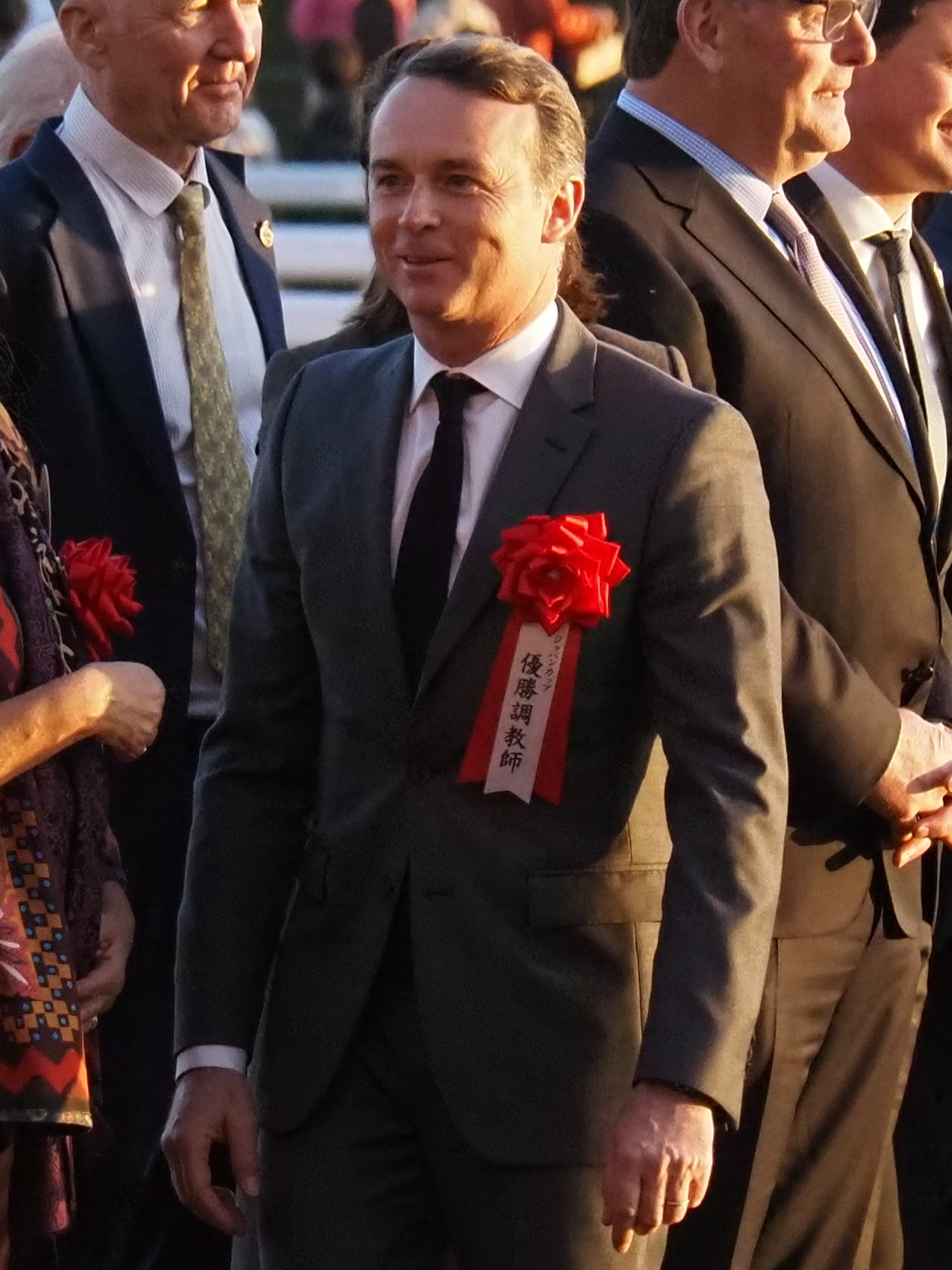
- Graffard at the 2025 Japan Cup

Personal information
- Born: 27 April 1977 (age 49) Le Creusot, France
- Occupation: Racehorse trainer

Horse racing career
- Sport: Horse racing

Significant horses
- Watch Me, The Revenant, Daryz, Gezora, Calandagan

Francis-Henri Graffard (born 27 April 1977) is a French racehorse trainer. Based in Chantilly, he has won multiple Group 1 races, including the Prix de l'Arc de Triomphe and the Japan Cup.

== Background and early career ==
Graffard comes from a racing background. His grandfather, Dr Henri Champliau, was a racehorse breeder who owned the 1955 Prix Vermeille winner, Wild Miss. Graffard graduated in law, before joining the inaugural Godolphin Flying Start programme in 2003. After completing the two-year course, he worked in the racing office of the Darley Stud for four years, and then became assistant to Alain de Royer-Dupré, who trained for the Aga Khan at Chantilly.

== Career as a trainer ==
Graffard took out his trainer's licence in October 2011 and had his first winner in January 2012. Later that year, he saddled his first Group winner, when Pearl Flute won the Group 3 Prix des Chênes. His first Group 1 success was with Erupt in the 2015 Grand Prix de Paris. Further Group 1 wins followed with Bateel, Channel, Watch Me, In Swoop, Wooded, and The Revenant. Watch Me provided Graffard with his first success at Royal Ascot, winning the 2019 Coronation Stakes.

At the beginning of 2022, following the retirement of de Royer-Dupré, Graffard became the main trainer in France for the Aga Khan. His first Group 1 winner for the Aga Khan was Rouhiya, who won the 2024 Poule d'Essai des Pouliches. His most successful season came in 2025, when he finished at the top of the French trainers' table for both wins and prize money. His thirteen Group/Grade 1 victories in the year included his first win in the Prix de l'Arc de Triomphe with Daryz. He achieved his first success in the Breeders' Cup when Gezora won the Filly and Mare Turf, and his first success in the Japan Cup with Calandagan.

== Personal life ==
Graffard met his wife, Lisa-Jane Moeran, on the Godolphin Flying Start programme. Lisa-Jane, who is from Ireland, went on to become Godolphin's representative in France. The couple married in Deauville in 2009, and have two daughters.

== Major wins ==
France

- Grand Prix de Paris - (1) - Erupt (2015)
- Grand Prix de Saint-Cloud - (1) - Calandagan (2025, 2026)
- Poule d'Essai des Poulains - (1) - Rayif (2026)
- Poule d'Essai des Pouliches - (2) - Rouhiya (2024), Zarigana (2025)
- Prix de Diane - (2) - Channel (2019), Gezora (2025)
- Prix Ganay - (1) - Daryz (2026)
- Prix de l'Abbaye de Longchamp - (1) - Wooded (2020)
- Prix de l'Arc de Triomphe - (1) - Daryz (2025, 2026)
- Prix du Moulin de Longchamp - (1) - Sahlan (2025), Erdenali (2026)
- Prix Jacques Le Marois - (1) - Rayif (2026)
- Prix Jean Prat - (1) - Woodshauna (2025)
- Prix Jean Romanet - (1) - Quisisana (2025)
- Prix Marcel Boussac - (1) - Vertical Blue (2024)
- Prix Rothschild - (1) - Watch Me (2020)
- Prix Vermeille - (2) - Bateel (2017), Sweet Lady (2022)
- Prix Vicomtesse Vigier - (1) - Candelari (2025)
- Prix Jean Luc Lagardère - (1) - Amusingly (2026)

Germany

- Deutsches Derby - (1) - In Swoop (2020)
- Grosser Preis von Baden - (1) - Goliath (2025)
- Preis von Europa - (2) - Sibayan (2025), Goliath (2026)

(United Kingdom) Great Britain

- Champion Stakes - (1) - Calandagan (2025)
- Coronation Stakes - (1) - Watch Me (2019)
- King George VI and Queen Elizabeth Stakes - (2) - Goliath (2024), Calandagan (2025)
- Queen Elizabeth II Stakes - (1) - The Revenant (2020)

Canada

- Canadian International Stakes - (1) - Erupt (2016)

United States

- Breeders' Cup Filly & Mare Turf - (1) - Gezora (2025)

Japan

- Japan Cup - (1) - Calandagan (2025)
- Mile Championship - (1) - Erdenali (2026)

United Arab Emirates

- Dubai Sheema Classic - (1) - Calandagan (2026)
