= Prix de l'Opéra =

Flat horse race in France

- Class: Group 1
- Location: Longchamp Racecourse; Paris, France
- Inaugurated: 1974
- Race type: Flat / Thoroughbred
- Sponsor: Longines
- Website: france-galop.com

Race information
- Distance: 2,000 metres (1¼ miles)
- Surface: Turf
- Track: Right-handed
- Qualification: Three-years-old and up fillies and mares
- Weight: 56 kg (3yo); 58 kg (4yo+)
- Purse: €500,000 (2021); 1st: €285,700

Prix de l'Opéra
2026
| Miss Scott | Precise | Pink Panthera |

Previous years
2025
Barnavara | See The Fire | One Look
2024
Friendly Soul | Running Lion | Sparkling Plenty
2023
Blue Rose Cen | Jackie Oh | Lumiere Rock
2022
Place Du Carrousel | Nashwa | Above The Curve
2021
Rougir | Grand Glory | Eudaimonia

2020-2011
2020
Tarnawa | Alpine Star | Audarya
2019
Villa Marina | Fleeting | Watch Me
2018
Wild Illusion | Magic Wand | Homerique
2017
Rhododendron | Hydrangea | Lady Frankel
2016
Speedy Boarding | Pleascach | So Mi Dar
2015
Covert Love | Jazzi Top | We Are
2014
We Are | Ribbons | Hadaatha
2013
Dalkala | Tasaday | Thistle Bird
2012
Ridasiyna | Izzi Top | Giofra
2011
Nahrain | Announce | Banimpire

2010–2001
2010
Lily Of The Valley | Stacelita | Fleur Enchantee
2009
Shalanaya | Board Meeting | Midday
2008
Lady Marian | Lush Lashes | Katiyra
2007
Satwa Queen | Promising Lead | Legerete
2006
Mandesha | Satwa Queen | Alexandrova
2005
Kinnaird | Mona Lisa | Alexander Goldrun
2004
Alexander Goldrun | Grey Lilas | Walkamia
2003
Zee Zee Top | Yesterday | Bright Sky
2002
Bright Sky | Irresistible Jewel | Marotta
2001
Terre A Terre | Mot Juste | Rebelline

2000–1994
2000
Petrushka | Reve D'Oscar | Lady Upstage
1999
Diamond White | Miss Berbere | Juvenia
1998
Insight | Bardonecchia | Miscast
1997
Clodora | Squeak | La Blue
1996
Donna Viola | La Blue | Sangria
1995
Timarida | Angel In My Heart | Balanka
1994
Andromaque | Misbegotten | Her Ladyship

The Prix de l'Opéra is a Group 1 flat horse race in France open to thoroughbred fillies and mares aged three years or older. It is run at Longchamp over a distance of 2,000 metres (about 1¼ miles) each year in early October.

== History ==
The event was established in 1974, and it was initially classed at Group 2 level. It was originally restricted to three and four-year-old fillies and contested over 1,850 metres.

The race was opened to older mares in 1990. It was extended to 2,000 metres and promoted to Group 1 status in 2000.

The Prix de l'Opéra was added to the Breeders' Cup Challenge series in 2011. The winner now earns an automatic invitation to compete in the same year's Breeders' Cup Filly & Mare Turf.

The race is held on the first Sunday in October, the same day as the Prix de l'Arc de Triomphe.

== Records ==
Most successful horse (2 wins):

- Athyka – 1988, 1989

Leading jockey (5 wins):

- Christophe Soumillon – Terre a Terre (2001), Mandesha (2006), Dalkala (2013), Tarnawa (2020), Miss Scott (2026)

Leading trainer (5 wins):

- Criquette Head-Maarek – Reine Mathilde (1984), Mona Stella (1987), Athyka (1988, 1989), Hatoof (1992)

Leading owner (4 wins):

- HH Aga Khan IV – Timarida (1995), Shalanaya (2009), Ridasiyna (2012), Dalkala (2013)

== Winners ==
| Year | Winner | Age | Jockey | Trainer | Owner | Time |
|---|---|---|---|---|---|---|
| 1974 | Cheryl | 3 | Jean-Claude Desaint | Freddie Palmer | T. Kitano | 2:00.50 |
| 1975 | Sea Sands | 3 | Yves Saint-Martin | Miguel Clément | W. J. Salmon Jr. | 1:57.60 |
| 1976 | Dona Barod | 4 | Maurice Philipperon | John Cunnington Jr. | Antonio Blasco | 2:02.20 |
| 1977 | Waya | 3 | Yves Saint-Martin | Angel Penna | Daniel Wildenstein | 1:53.50 |
| 1978 | Cistus | 3 | Willie Carson | Dick Hern | Sir Michael Sobell | 2:03.40 |
| 1979 | Producer | 3 | Lester Piggott | Maurice Zilber | Roy Gottlieb | 1:56.30 |
| 1980 | Hortensia | 3 | Alain Lequeux | Olivier Douieb | Robert Sangster | 1:52.20 |
| 1981 | Kilmona | 3 | Yves Saint-Martin | Gérald Sauque | Mrs Léon Givaudan | 2:01.90 |
| 1982 | Dione | 3 | Willie Carson | John Dunlop | Daniel Prenn | 1:59.70 |
| 1983 | Royal Heroine | 3 | Walter Swinburn | Michael Stoute | Robert Sangster | 1:50.10 |
| 1984 | Reine Mathilde | 3 | Freddy Head | Criquette Head | Ecurie Aland | 2:08.10 |
| 1985 | Bella Colora | 3 | Walter Swinburn | Michael Stoute | Helena Springfield Ltd | 1:53.50 |
| 1986 | Secret Form | 3 | Cash Asmussen | Pascal Bary | Peter Goulandris | 1:53.70 |
| 1987 | Mona Stella | 3 | Gary W. Moore | Criquette Head | Jacques Wertheimer | 1:56.50 |
| 1988 | Athyka | 3 | Guy Guignard | Criquette Head | Jacques Wertheimer | 1:52.00 |
| 1989 | Athyka | 4 | Guy Guignard | Criquette Head | Jacques Wertheimer | 1:56.30 |
| 1990 | Colour Chart | 3 | Cash Asmussen | André Fabre | Sheikh Mohammed | 1:54.60 |
| 1991 | Martessa | 3 | Terence Hellier | Andreas Wöhler | Gestüt Hof Heidendom | 1:56.30 |
| 1992 | Hatoof | 3 | Walter Swinburn | Criquette Head | Maktoum Al Maktoum | 2:02.50 |
| 1993 | Verveine | 4 | Olivier Peslier | Élie Lellouche | Daniel Wildenstein | 1:58.90 |
| 1994 | Andromaque (Note: Erin Bird finished first in 1994, but she was relegated to fifth place following a stewards' inquiry.) | 4 | Pat Eddery | Roger Charlton | Carlos Stelling | 1:53.90 |
| 1995 | Timarida | 3 | Johnny Murtagh | John Oxx | Aga Khan IV | 1:55.70 |
| 1996 | Donna Viola | 4 | John Reid | Chris Wall | Kieran Scott | 1:55.50 |
| 1997 | Clodora | 3 | Thierry Jarnet | André Fabre | Jean-Luc Lagardère | 1:51.10 |
| 1998 | Insight | 3 | Cash Asmussen | John Hammond | Niarchos Family | 1:58.60 |
| 1999 | Diamond White | 4 | Tim Sprake | Mick Ryan | Peter Scott | 2:02.30 |
| 2000 | Petrushka | 3 | Johnny Murtagh | Sir Michael Stoute | Highclere Racing Ltd | 2:02.00 |
| 2001 | Terre a Terre | 4 | Christophe Soumillon | Eric Libaud | Devin / Ashbrooke | 2:19.30 |
| 2002 | Bright Sky | 3 | Dominique Boeuf | Élie Lellouche | Ecurie Wildenstein | 2:02.30 |
| 2003 | Zee Zee Top | 4 | Kieren Fallon | Sir Michael Stoute | Helena Springfield Ltd | 2:08.00 |
| 2004 | Alexander Goldrun | 3 | Kevin Manning | Jim Bolger | Miriam O'Callaghan | 2:02.30 |
| 2005 | Kinnaird | 4 | Kevin Darley | Patrick Haslam | Renata Jacobs | 2:04.60 |
| 2006 | Mandesha | 3 | Christophe Soumillon | Alain de Royer-Dupré | Zahra Aga Khan | 2:00.90 |
| 2007 | Satwa Queen | 5 | Thierry Thulliez | Jean de Roualle | Steven & Gillian Lamprell | 2:03.80 |
| 2008 | Lady Marian | 3 | Dominique Boeuf | Werner Baltromei | R'stall Gestüt Hachtsee | 2:03.80 |
| 2009 | Shalanaya | 3 | Maxime Guyon | Mikel Delzangles | HH Aga Khan IV | 2:01.80 |
| 2010 | Lily of the Valley | 3 | Ioritz Mendizabal | Jean-Claude Rouget | Bernard Barsi | 2:09.80 |
| 2011 | Nahrain | 3 | Frankie Dettori | Roger Varian | Ahmed Al Maktoum | 2:02.74 |
| 2012 | Ridasiyna | 3 | Christophe Lemaire | Mikel Delzangles | HH Aga Khan IV | 2:11.13 |
| 2013 | Dalkala | 4 | Christophe Soumillon | Alain de Royer-Dupré | HH Aga Khan IV | 2:09.03 |
| 2014 | We Are | 3 | Thierry Jarnet | Freddy Head | George Strawbridge Jr. | 2:02.43 |
| 2015 | Covert Love | 3 | Pat Smullen | Hugo Palmer | Fomo Syndicate | 2:04.43 |
| 2016 | Speedy Boarding (Note: The 2016 and 2017 runnings took place at Chantilly while Longchamp was closed for redevelopment.) | 4 | Frederik Tylicki | James Fanshawe | Helena Springfield Ltd | 2:02.03 |
| 2017 | Rhododendron | 3 | Seamie Heffernan | Aidan O'Brien | Magnier / Tabor / Smith | 2:03.60 |
| 2018 | Wild Illusion | 3 | William Buick | Charlie Appleby | Godolphin | 2:04.32 |
| 2019 | Villa Marina | 3 | Olivier Peslier | Carlos Laffon-Parias | SARL Darpat France | 2:09.09 |
| 2020 | Tarnawa | 4 | Christophe Soumillon | Dermot Weld | HH Aga Khan IV | 2:12.87 |
| 2021 | Rougir | 3 | Maxime Guyon | Cedric Rossi | Le Haras De La Gousserie | 2:11.15 |
| 2022 | Place Du Carrousel | 3 | Mickael Barzalona | André Fabre | Al Shaqab Racing & Ballylinch Stud | 2:12.64 |
| 2023 | Blue Rose Cen | 3 | Aurelien Lemaitre | Christopher Head | Yeguada Centurion SL | 2:03.71 |
| 2024 | Friendly Soul | 3 | Kieran Shoemark | John & Thady Gosden | George Strawbridge | 2:07.65 |
| 2025 | Barnavara | 3 | Shane Foley | Jessica Harrington | Alpha Racing | 2:05.52 |
| 2026 | Miss Scott | 3 | Christophe Soumillon | John & Thady Gosden | The Thoroughbred Racing Corp | 2:02.41 |

== See also ==
- List of French flat horse races
