= Gone West (horse) =

American-bred Thoroughbred racehorse

- Sire: Mr. Prospector
- Grandsire: Raise a Native
- Dam: Secrettame
- Damsire: Secretariat
- Sex: Stallion
- Foaled: 1984
- Country: United States
- Colour: Brown
- Breeder: William O. Reed
- Owner: Hickory Tree Stable
- Trainer: Woody Stephens
- Record: 17: 6-4-2
- Earnings: US$682,251

Major wins
- Dwyer Stakes (1987); Gotham Stakes (1987); Withers Stakes (1987)

Gone West (March 10, 1984 – September 7, 2009) was an American Thoroughbred racehorse. Bred by William O. Reed, he was a son of the influential sire Mr. Prospector. His dam, Secrettame, was a daughter of 1973 U.S. Triple Crown winner Secretariat.

Purchased by Alice du Pont Mills and raced under her Hickory Tree Stable banner, Gone West was conditioned for racing by U.S. Racing Hall of Fame trainer Woody Stephens. While Gone West won three important stakes races, he is best known as a sire and a sire of sires. At stud, among the notable horses he sired are:

- West by West (1989–2011) – multiple stakes winner with career earnings of $1,038,123
- Zafonic (1990–2002) – won British Classic 2,000 Guineas Stakes European Champion Two-Year-Old Colt
- Lassigny (b. 1991) – won G1 Rothman's International (1995), career earnings $1,318,371
- Da Hoss (b. 1992) – won Breeders' Cup Mile (1996, 1998), career earnings $1,931,558
- Elusive Quality (1993–2018) – stakes winner, sired Smarty Jones, Raven's Pass, Quality Road
- Commendable (1997–2014) – won Belmont Stakes (2000)
- Speightstown (b. 1998) – won Breeders' Cup Sprint (2004), American Champion Sprint Horse (2004), career earnings $1,258,256
- Came Home (1999–2021) – multiple Grade 1 winner, career earnings $1,835,940
- Johar (1999–2014) – won G1 Hollywood Derby (2002), G1 Breeders' Cup Turf (2003); career earnings $1,494,496
- Marsh Side (b. 2003) – won G1 Canadian International, career earnings $1,519,706

Other sons of Gone West who became good sires were Zamindar, Mr. Greeley, Proud Citizen, Grand Slam, and Western Winter. Gone West is the damsire of 2005 Epsom Derby winner, Motivator.

At maturity, he reached 16 hands (64 inches, 163 cm) high.

Gone West stood at Mill Ridge Farm in Lexington, Kentucky. They announced that the stallion would be pensioned after the 2009 breeding season. However, he was euthanized due to complications from colic.
