= Zafonic =

American-bred Thoroughbred racehorse (1990&ndash2002)

- Sire: Gone West
- Grandsire: Mr. Prospector
- Dam: Zaizafon
- Damsire: The Minstrel
- Sex: Stallion
- Foaled: 1 April 1990
- Country: United States
- Colour: Brown/Black
- Breeder: Juddmonte Farms
- Owner: Khalid Abdullah
- Trainer: André Fabre
- Record: 7: 5-1-0
- Earnings: £374,042

Major wins
- Prix Morny (1992); Prix de la Salamandre (1992); Dewhurst Stakes (1992); 2,000 Guineas (1993)

Awards
- European Champion Two-Yr-Old Colt (1992); Timeform rating: 130
- Last updated on 29 June 2024

Zafonic (1 April 1990 – 7 September 2002) was a European Thoroughbred racehorse bred in Kentucky. He was the 1992 European Champion Two-Year-Old Colt and won the following year's 2,000 Guineas.

== Background ==
Zafonic was sired by the Mr. Prospector stallion Gone West, out of the Seaton Delaval Stakes winner Zaizafon, a daughter of The Minstrel. He was owned and bred by Khalid Abdullah and conditioned by the French trainer André Fabre.

== Racing career ==
Racing at age two, Zafonic went undefeated. After winning a minor race at Deauville in August, he followed up with a win in the Group One Prix Morny at the same course ten days later. Three weeks later in the Prix de la Salamandre at Longchamp, he took the lead in the straight and pulled clear to beat Kingmambo by three lengths. He then was shipped to the Newmarket Racecourse in the United Kingdom where he won the Dewhurst Stakes by four lengths in "very impressive" style. His 1992 performance earned him the Cartier Racing Award as Europe's Champion Two-Year-Old Colt.

At three, Zafonic started at 10-1 ON for his debut in the Prix Djebel but lost his unbeaten record when he was beaten a short head by Kingmambo. Sent back to Newmarket for the British Classic, the 2,000 Guineas, Zafonic won by 3½ lengths from Barathea and breaking a 45-year-old course record. In the Sussex Stakes, the colt burst a blood vessel and finished seventh.

== Stud career ==
His racing career over, Zafonic was sent to his owner's Banstead Manor Stud near the village of Cheveley in East Cambridgeshire. He sired more than two dozen stakes winners including Xaar, the 1997 European 2-Year-Old Champion and winner of the Dewhurst Stakes and Prix de la Salamandre, Count Dubois (Gran Criterium), Zafeen (St James's Palace Stakes), Iffraaj and Trade Fair.

In August 2002, Zafonic's owner leased him for the southern hemisphere covering season to Arrowfield Stud in Scone, New South Wales, Australia. Only a few days after being released from quarantine, Zafonic died on 7 September 2002 as the result of an accident at Arrowfield's paddock.

== Pedigree ==
Pedigree of Zafonic (USA), bay stallion, 1990
Sire Gone West (USA) 1984	Mr. Prospector (USA); 1970	Raise a Native	Native Dancer
Sire Gone West (USA) 1984	Mr. Prospector (USA); 1970	Raise a Native	Raise You
Sire Gone West (USA) 1984	Mr. Prospector (USA); 1970	Gold Digger	Nashua
Sire Gone West (USA) 1984	Mr. Prospector (USA); 1970	Gold Digger	Sequence
Sire Gone West (USA) 1984	Secrettame (USA); 1978	Secretariat	Bold Ruler
Sire Gone West (USA) 1984	Secrettame (USA); 1978	Secretariat	Somethingroyal
Sire Gone West (USA) 1984	Secrettame (USA); 1978	Tamerett	Tim Tam
Sire Gone West (USA) 1984	Secrettame (USA); 1978	Tamerett	Mixed Marriage
Dam Zaizafon (USA) 1982	The Minstrel (CAN); 1974	Northern Dancer	Nearctic
Dam Zaizafon (USA) 1982	The Minstrel (CAN); 1974	Northern Dancer	Natalma
Dam Zaizafon (USA) 1982	The Minstrel (CAN); 1974	Fleur	Victoria Park
Dam Zaizafon (USA) 1982	The Minstrel (CAN); 1974	Fleur	Flaming Page
Dam Zaizafon (USA) 1982	Mofida (GB); 1974	Right Tack	Hard Tack
Dam Zaizafon (USA) 1982	Mofida (GB); 1974	Right Tack	Polly Macaw
Dam Zaizafon (USA) 1982	Mofida (GB); 1974	Wold Lass	Vilmorin
Dam Zaizafon (USA) 1982	Mofida (GB); 1974	Wold Lass	Cheb (Family: 9-e)
