= Pretty Gorgeous =

French-bred Thoroughbred racehorse

- Racing silks of Mr John C Oxley
- Sire: Lawman
- Grandsire: Invincible Spirit
- Dam: Gorgeous
- Damsire: Compton Place
- Sex: Filly
- Foaled: 24 February 2018
- Country: France
- Colour: Bay
- Breeder: Ecurie Haras du Cadran
- Owner: Anne Marie O'Brien and John C Oxley
- Trainer: Joseph Patrick O'Brien
- Record: 5: 3-2-0
- Earnings: £327,645

Major wins
- Debutante Stakes (2020); Fillies' Mile (2020)

Awards
- Cartier Champion Two-year-old Filly (2020); Top-rated European two-year-old filly (2020)

Pretty Gorgeous (foaled 24 February 2018) is a French-bred, Irish-trained Thoroughbred racehorse. She was one of the best two-year-olds in Europe in 2020 when she won three of her five races including the Debutante Stakes and the Fillies' Mile

== Background ==
Pretty Gorgeous is a bay filly with a white blaze and three white socks bred in France by a partnership headed by the Ecurie Haras du Cadran. In December 2018 she was put up for auction at the Arqana sale and bought for €55,000 by the bloodstock agent Margaret O'Toole. As a yearling she was consigned to the Tattersalls sale in October 2019 and was bought for 525,000 guineas by the trainer Joseph Patrick O'Brien. Pretty Gorgeous is owned in partnership by O'Brien's mother Anne-Marie and John Oxley racing in alternating colours. She was taken into training with O'Brien at Owning Hill, County Kilkenny.

She is from the tenth crop of foals sired by Lawman who won the Prix du Jockey Club and the Prix Jean Prat in 2006. His other progeny have included Just The Judge, Most Improved, Marcel and Harbour Law. Pretty Gorgeous's dam Lady Gorgeous showed some racing ability, winning one minor event and running third in the Listed Surrey Stakes from thirteen track appearances. She was descended from the British broodmare Adjournment who was the female-line ancestor of Master Derby.

== Racing career ==
=== 2020: two-year-old season ===
The flat racing season in Great Britain and Ireland was disrupted by the COVID-19 pandemic: most of the major spring races were either cancelled or rescheduled and subsequent events were held behind closed doors. Pretty Gorgeous made her racecourse debut in a maiden race over one mile at Bellewstown on 2 July when she was ridden by Shane Crosse and went off at odds of 2/1 in nine-runner field. She took the lead three furlongs from the finish and went clear of her rivals to win by five lengths despite being eased down in the closing stages. Crosse was again in the saddle when the filly was stepped up in class for the Group 3 Silver Flash Stakes at Leopardstown Racecourse on 6 August. She started favourite but despite making strong progress in the last quarter mile she was beaten into second place by the 14/1 outsider Shale (trained by Joseph O'Brien's brother Donnacha). Sixteen days later Pretty Gorgeous faced Shale again in the Group 2 Debutante Stakes over seven furlongs at the Curragh and started the 3/1 second favourite behind her rival in an eight-runner field which also included Mother Earth (Fillies' Sprint Stakes). Ridden by Crosse, she raced in mid-division before making good progress approaching the last quarter mile. She overtook Shale inside the final furlong and drew away in the final strides to win by two and a half lengths. After the race Joseph O'Brien said "We felt that she’d definitely get closer to Donnacha’s filly after her run in Leopardstown, because we thought the Curragh would be more suitable for us... I thought Shane gave her a lovely, cool ride today... She's a big, strong lady. She cost a good few quid as a yearling, but she was an outstanding physical specimen at the sales. The sky is the limit for her."

Declan McDonagh took the ride when Pretty Gorgeous was stepped up to Group 1 level and started the 11/10 favourite for the Group 1 Moyglare Stud Stakes over seven furlongs at the Curragh on 13 September. Crosse was scheduled to ride but had tested positive for coronavirus and his resulting quarantine meant that he also missed the winning ride on Galileo Chrome in the St Leger. She produced a strong run in the last quarter mile but was unable to overhaul the front-running Shale and finished second, beaten three quarters of a length by her old rival.

On 9 October Pretty Gorgeous was reunited with Crosse when she was sent to England and moved up in distance for the Fillies' Mile at Newmarket Racecourse. The filly had been scheduled to run in the Prix Marcel Boussac a week earlier but the O'Brien contingent was withdrawn en masse when four horses failed drug tests, with the results being attributed to a batch of contaminated feed. She went off the 5/2 favourite ahead of Shale in a ten-runner field which also included Isabella Giles (Rockfel Stakes) and Indigo Girl (May Hill Stakes) as well as Mother Earth and Snowfall, representing the Aidan O'Brien stable. After racing in mid-division she moved up to challenge the front-running Dubai Fountain in the last quarter mile, gained the advantage inside the final furlong and held on to win by half a length from Indigo Girl with the same distance back to "Snowfall" in third. In a bizarre postscript to the race it was revealed that the two Aidan O'Brien runners had carried the wrong number cloths and been ridden by the wrong jockeys, meaning that the filly who finished third was actually Mother Earth. After the race Crosse, who was recording his first Group 1 success said "This is huge. There may be no crowd and no atmosphere, but once you are on the horse's back, it doesn't make a difference... This filly has given me a few great days already, but this is the best of my life. She must be a One Thousand Guineas filly after that as she has loads of speed and she's a miler. Hopefully, all her best days are ahead of her. This takes a lot of edge off what happened in the St. Leger, which you wouldn't want to wish on your worst enemy."

On 19 November Pretty Gorgeous was named Champion Two-year-old Filly at the Cartier Racing Awards. In the official European classification of for 2020 Pretty Gorgeous was given a rating of 113, making her the equal best two-year-old filly of the season alongside Campanelle and Shale.

== Pedigree ==
Pedigree of Pretty Gorgeous (FR), bay filly 2010
| Sire Lawman (FR) 2004 | Invincible Spirit (IRE); 1997 | Green Desert (USA) | Danzig |
| Sire Lawman (FR) 2004 | Invincible Spirit (IRE); 1997 | Green Desert (USA) | Foreign Courier |
| Sire Lawman (FR) 2004 | Invincible Spirit (IRE); 1997 | Rafha (GB) | Kris |
| Sire Lawman (FR) 2004 | Invincible Spirit (IRE); 1997 | Rafha (GB) | Eljazzi (IRE) |
| Sire Lawman (FR) 2004 | Laramie (USA); 1994 | Gulch | Mr Prospector |
| Sire Lawman (FR) 2004 | Laramie (USA); 1994 | Gulch | Jameela |
| Sire Lawman (FR) 2004 | Laramie (USA); 1994 | Light The Lights (FR) | Shirley Heights (GB) |
| Sire Lawman (FR) 2004 | Laramie (USA); 1994 | Light The Lights (FR) | Lighted Glory (USA) |
| Dam Lady Gorgeous (GB) 2009 | Compton Place (GB); 1994 | Indian Ridge (IRE) | Ahonoora (GB) |
| Dam Lady Gorgeous (GB) 2009 | Compton Place (GB); 1994 | Indian Ridge (IRE) | Hillbrow (GB) |
| Dam Lady Gorgeous (GB) 2009 | Compton Place (GB); 1994 | Nosey (IRE) | Nebbiolo (GB) |
| Dam Lady Gorgeous (GB) 2009 | Compton Place (GB); 1994 | Nosey (IRE) | Little Cynthia |
| Dam Lady Gorgeous (GB) 2009 | Cayman Sunset (IRE); 1997 | Night Shift (USA) | Northern Dancer (CAN) |
| Dam Lady Gorgeous (GB) 2009 | Cayman Sunset (IRE); 1997 | Night Shift (USA) | Ciboulette (CAN) |
| Dam Lady Gorgeous (GB) 2009 | Cayman Sunset (IRE); 1997 | Robinia (USA) | Roberto |
| Dam Lady Gorgeous (GB) 2009 | Cayman Sunset (IRE); 1997 | Robinia (USA) | Royal Graustark (Family: 1-l) |
