= 2013 1000 Guineas =

200th 1000 Guineas Stakes
- 1000 Guineas
- Location: Newmarket Racecourse
- Date: 5 May 2013
- Winning horse: Sky Lantern (IRE)
- Jockey: Richard Hughes
- Trainer: Richard Hannon Sr. (GB)
- Owner: Ben Keswick

2013 1000 Guineas Stakes

Sky Lantern

Just The Judge

Moth

The 2013 1000 Guineas Stakes was a horse race held at Newmarket Racecourse on Sunday 5 May 2013. It was the 200th running of the 1000 Guineas.

The winner was Ben Keswick's Sky Lantern, a three-year-old grey filly trained at East Everleigh in Wiltshire by Richard Hannon Sr. and ridden by Richard Hughes. Sky Lantern's victory was the first in the race for her owner, trainer and jockey.

== The contenders ==
The race attracted a field of fifteen runners, ten trained in the United Kingdom, three in Ireland and two in France. The favourite was the Henry Cecil-trained Hot Snap, who had won the Nell Gwyn Stakes by two and a quarter lengths on 17 April. Sky Lantern, the runner-up in the Nell Gwyn Stakes had won the Moyglare Stud Stakes in Ireland in 2012. The French challenge was led by What A Name, who had won the Prix La Rochette and finished second in the Grand Critérium as a two-year-old before winning the Prix Imprudence on her three-year-old debut. The Irish runners were Moth and Snow Queen from Aidan O'Brien's Ballydoyle stable and the Dermot Weld-trained Rasmeyaa. The other contenders included Maureen, who had won the Fred Darling Stakes from Agent Allison, the Prestige Stakes winner Ollie Olga and Winning Express, runner-up in the Cheveley Park Stakes. Hot Snap headed the betting at odds of 5/2 ahead of What A Name (7/2) and Just The Judge (7/1) with Sky Lantern and Moth on 9/1.

== The race ==
The 100/1 outsider Masarah broke quickly and set the pace from Celtic Filly, Winning Express, Rasmeyaa and Just The Judge. Instead of splitting into groups on the wide Newmarket course, the runner clustered and raced down the middle of the track. Winning Express moved to the front approaching the final quarter mile but was soon challenged by Just The Judge as the favourite Hot Snap began to struggle and Sky Lantern began to make rapid progress. Just The Judge took the advantage inside the final furlong and looked likely to win but was caught fifty yards from the finish by Sky Lantern, who won by half a length. Moth, who had been hampered when attempting to make her challenge, finished strongly to take third place by a nose from Winning Express. Of the other fancied runners, Maureen finished sixth, What A Name seventh, and Hot Snap ninth.

== Race details ==
- Sponsor: QIPCO
- First prize: £241,586
- Surface: Turf
- Going: Good to Firm
- Distance: 8 furlongs
- Number of runners: 15
- Winner's time: 1:36.38

== Full result ==
Pos.	Marg.	Horse (bred)	Jockey	Trainer (Country)	Odds
1		Sky Lantern (IRE)	Richard Hughes	Richard Hannon Sr. (GB)	9/1
2	½	Just The Judge (IRE)	Jamie Spencer	Charles Hills (GB)	7/1
3	1½	Moth (IRE)	Joseph O'Brien	Aidan O'Brien (IRE)	9/1
4	nse	Winning Express (IRE)	Franny Norton	Ed McMahon (GB)	33/1
5	nk	Snow Queen (IRE)	Ryan Moore	Aidan O'Brien (IRE)	20/1
6	shd	Maureen (IRE)	Olivier Peslier	Richard Hannon Sr. (GB)	16/1
7	2	What A Name (IRE)	Christophe Lemaire	Mikel Delzangles (FR)	7/2
8	¾	Masarah (IRE)	Frederik Tylicki	Clive Brittain (GB)	100/1
9	½	Hot Snap (GB)	Tom Queally	Henry Cecil (GB)	5/2 fav
10	8	Roz (GB)	Jim Crowley	Harry Dunlop (GB)	33/1
11	2¼	Agent Allison (GB)	William Buick	Peter Chapple-Hyam (GB)	25/1
12	nk	Ollie Olga (USA)	Martin Harley	Mick Channon (GB)	40/1
13	3½	Celtic Filly (IRE)	Mickael Barzalona	Eoghan O'Neill (FR)	100/1
14	29	Rasmeyaa (IRE)	Pat Smullen	Dermot Weld (IRE)	9/1
15	10	Diaminda (IRE)	Paul Hanagan	Alan Jarvis (GB)	50/1

- Abbreviations: nse = nose; nk = neck; shd = head; hd = head; dist = distance; UR = unseated rider

== Winner's details ==
Further details of the winner, Sky Lantern

- Foaled: 27 January 2010
- Country: Ireland
- Sire: Red Clubs; Dam: Shawanni (Shareef Dancer)
- Owner: Ben Keswick
- Breeder: Tally-Ho Stud
