= Sulk (disambiguation) =

Sulk is a 1982 album by the Associates.

Sulk may also refer to:

- Sulk (British band), a London psychedelic rock/shoegaze band
- Sulk (Canadian band), a Canadian pop/rock/dance music group
- Sulk, 1996 album by the Canadian band Sulk
- Sulk, 1993 album by Molly Half Head
- "Sulk", a song by Radiohead from The Bends
- "Sulk", a song by Billy Bragg from Reaching to the Converted
- Sulk (horse), a racehorse

== See also ==
- Sulky, a 2-wheeled horse- or dog-drawn cart
- Le Sulk, nickname for French footballer Nicolas Anelka
