= Just The Judge =

Irish-bred Thoroughbred racehorse

- Racing silks of Sangster Family and Qatar Racing
- Sire: Lawman
- Grandsire: Invincible Spirit
- Dam: Faraday Light
- Damsire: Rainbow Quest
- Sex: Mare
- Foaled: 19 April 2010
- Country: Ireland
- Colour: Bay or brown
- Breeder: Joan Keaney Dempsey
- Owner: Sangster Family; Sangster Family & Qatar Racing; Qatar Racing & China Horse Club
- Trainer: Charles Hills
- Record: 15: 5-1-5
- Earnings: ££762,414

Major wins
- Washington Singer Stakes (2012); Rockfel Stakes (2012); Irish 1000 Guineas (2013); E. P. Taylor Stakes (2014)

Just The Judge (19 April 2010 – April 2019) was an Irish-bred British-trained Thoroughbred racehorse and broodmare who won major races in both Europe and North America. She was unbeaten in three starts as a two-year-old in 2012 including the Listed Washington Singer Stakes and the Group Two Rockfel Stakes. In the following year she finished second in the 1000 Guineas before winning the Irish 1000 Guineas and finishing third in the Coronation Stakes. As a four-year-old she produced her best form in North America where she won the E. P. Taylor Stakes as well as being placed in the Beverly D. Stakes and the Breeders' Cup Filly & Mare Turf. After being sold for a record price of 4.5 million guineas at the end of 2014 she was beaten on her only start as a five-year-old and was retired from racing to become a broodmare.

== Background ==
Just The Judge is a bay or brown mare with a white star and a white sock on her left foreleg bred in Ireland by Joan Keaney Dempsey. As a yearling in September 2011 the filly was offered for sale at the Goffs Orby sale and was bought for €50,000 by the bloodstock agency BBA Ireland and the trainer Charles Hills. She entered the ownership of the Sangster family and Matthew Green and was taken into training by Hills at Lambourn in Berkshire.

She is from the second crop of foals sired by Lawman who won the Prix du Jockey Club and the Prix Jean Prat in 2006. His other progeny have included Most Improved, Marcel and Harbour Law. Just The Judge's dam Faraday Light showed absolutely no racing ability, finishing tailed-off in both of her races. She was, however, a descendant of the influential Irish broodmare Mesopotamia (foaled 1961), who was the ancestor of many major winners including Halling, Mastery, Balla Cove and Cherokee Rose.

== Racing career ==
=== 2012: two-year-old season ===
Just The Judge was ridden in all three of her races by her trainer's brother Michael Hills. On her racecourse debut she started the 11/4 joint-favourite for a maiden race over seven furlongs at Newbury Racecourse on 26 June. After being restrained towards the rear of the nine-runner field she began to make progress in the last quarter mile, took the lead inside the final furlong and won by three quarters of a length from Pompeia. On 18 August the filly was moved up in class and matched against male opposition for the Listed Washington Singer Stakes over the same course and distance. Starting at odds of 3/1 she was held up by Hills in the early stages she made "smooth headway" to join the leaders a furlong out and then accelerated to win by a length from the colt Excess Knowledge. After the race a half-share in the filly was bought by Sheikh Fahad Al Thani's Qatar Racing.

After an eight-week break Just The Judge returned in the Group Two Rockfel Stakes at Newmarket Racecourse on 13 October and started at odds of 6/1 in an eleven-runner field. The Irish-trained Gift From Heaven started favourite started favourite whilst the other runners included Melody of Love (Firth of Clyde Stakes) and Scintillula (runner-up in the Moyglare Stud Stakes). After racing just behind the front-runners she accelerated into the lead approaching the final furlong and kept on well to win by one and three quarter lengths from the Luca Cumani-trained Nargys. Charles Hills commented "She won like a nice filly and Michael said she still had another gear. She has gone away again when she hit the rising ground. She has gone in her coat and had a bad scope following her last run and we had thought of not running today, but I am delighted we decided to give it one more go".

=== 2013: three-year-old season ===
Jamie Spencer took over as Just The Judge's jockey in 2013 and rode her in all but one of her subsequent races. On her three-year-old debut, Just The Judge was one of fifteen fillies to contest the 200th edition of the 1000 Guineas over the Rowley Mile course at Newmarket on 5 May. Starting the 7/1 third favourite she tracked the leaders before taking the lead inside the final furlong but was overtaken in the final strides and beaten half a length into second place by Sky Lantern. Three weeks after her run at Newmarket, the filly was sent to Ireland and started the 2/1 favourite for the Irish 1000 Guineas at the Curragh. Her fourteen opponents included Big Break (Killavullan Stakes), Maureen (Princess Margaret Stakes, Fred Darling Stakes), Harasiya (Silver Flash Stakes), Just Pretending (Derrinstown Stud 1,000 Guineas Trial) and Rehn's Nest (Park Express Stakes). After settling behind the leaders Just The Judge began to make progress in the last quarter mile, overtook Just Pretending 150 yards from the finish and "stayed on well" to win by one and a half lengths from Rehn's Nest. After the race Hills said "I'm feeling relieved at the moment, but I'm sure I'll wake up in the middle of the night and think it's great. Jamie never really had to pick the stick up and he gave her a beautiful ride".

Just The Judge faced a rematch with Sky Lantern in the Coronation Stakes at Royal Ascot on 21 June. She took the lead approaching the final furlong but was no match for Sky Lantern who accelerated past her to win by four lengths, with Just The Judge losing second place to the French-trained Kenhope in the final strides. She was moved up in distance for the ten-furlong Nassau Stakes at Goodwood Racecourse on 3 August but made no impact and finished unplaced behind Winsili. On er final run of the year, in Sun Chariot Stakes at Newmarket on 28 September she led the field for most of the way before fading badly and finishing sixth of the seven runners.

=== 2014: four-year-old season ===
On her debut as a four-year-old Just The Judge was matched against male opposition in the Earl of Sefton Stakes at Newmarket on 17 April and finished fifth behind the eight-year-old gelding Mull of Killough. She returned to female competition and started favourite for the Princess Elizabeth Stakes at Epsom in early but was beaten into third place by the six-year-old Thistle Bird and Odeliz. She faced Thistle Bird again in the Pretty Polly Stakes at the Curragh later that month but again proved no match for the older mare and finished third of the eight runners.

For the remainder of the season Just The Judge was campaigned in North America. IN the Grade I Beverly D. Stakes at Arlington Park on 16 August she had some trouble obtaining a clear run before finishing strongly and taking a close third behind Euro Charline and Stephanie's Kitten. On 19 October at Woodbine Racetrack in Toronto Just The Judge started 1.6/1 favourite for the E. P. Taylor Stakes over one and a quarter miles with the best-fancied of her seven opponents being Deceptive Vision (Canadian Stakes) and Odeliz. After being restrained at the rear of the field she began to make progress three furlongs out before being having to be switched to the right hampering a rival in the process, to make space for her challenge. She took the lea a furlong out and despite hanging left and right in the final strides she stayed on to win by half a length from Odeliz. Spencer commented "the race was very unsatisfactory... it was very, very tight where I was. Then she had to make a little bit of room for herself early in the stretch. I was trying to not give her too hard of a race because obviously this is basically a stepping stone to the Breeders' Cup. So the plan was just to win here and ship on down. She's won but I'd prefer if it had gone a little bit smoother."

Two weeks after her win in Canada, Just The Judge was sent to California to contest the Breeders' Cup Filly & Mare Turf at Santa Anita Park. She stayed on in the straight without being able to reach the lead and finished third behind Dayatthespa and Stephanie's Kitten with the favourite Dank in fourth.

In December Just The Judge was put up for auction at Tattersalls and was bought for 4.5 million guineas by Qatar Racing & China Horse Club. The price was a record for a filly sold at public auction in Britain. As Qatar Racing had previously been partners in the ownership, the sale effectively saw the China Horse Club buying the Sangster Family's share.

=== 2015: five-year-old season ===
On her first and only start for her new owners Just The Judge started a 28/1 outsider for the Sheema Classic over 2400 metres at Meydan Racecourse in Dubai on 28 March. Ridden by Andrea Atzeni she led the field into the straight before fading and finishing sixth of the nine runners behind Dolniya.

After she suffered a tendon injury Just The Judge was retired from racing in July 2015. Hills said "All good things come to an end, but I'm very proud of Just The Judge's achievements. She's been a tremendously sound filly, and with three months' rest could have raced on, but she had nothing else to prove on the racecourse".

== Breeding record ==
Just The Judge produced three foals. She died in April 2019 after undergoing surgery for colic.

== Pedigree ==
Pedigree of Just The Judge (IRE), brown mare 2010
Sire Lawman (FR) 2004	Invincible Spirit (IRE); 1997	Green Desert	Danzig
Sire Lawman (FR) 2004	Invincible Spirit (IRE); 1997	Green Desert	Foreign Courier
Sire Lawman (FR) 2004	Invincible Spirit (IRE); 1997	Rafha	Kris
Sire Lawman (FR) 2004	Invincible Spirit (IRE); 1997	Rafha	Eljazzi
Sire Lawman (FR) 2004	Laramie (USA); 1994	Gulch	Mr. Prospector
Sire Lawman (FR) 2004	Laramie (USA); 1994	Gulch	Jameela
Sire Lawman (FR) 2004	Laramie (USA); 1994	Light The Lights	Shirley Heights
Sire Lawman (FR) 2004	Laramie (USA); 1994	Light The Lights	Lighted Glory
Dam Faraday Light (IRE) 2003	Rainbow Quest (USA); 1981	Blushing Groom	Red God
Dam Faraday Light (IRE) 2003	Rainbow Quest (USA); 1981	Blushing Groom	Runaway Bride
Dam Faraday Light (IRE) 2003	Rainbow Quest (USA); 1981	I Will Follow	Herbager
Dam Faraday Light (IRE) 2003	Rainbow Quest (USA); 1981	I Will Follow	Where You Lead
Dam Faraday Light (IRE) 2003	Uncharted Haven (GB); 1997	Turtle Island	Fairy King
Dam Faraday Light (IRE) 2003	Uncharted Haven (GB); 1997	Turtle Island	Sisania
Dam Faraday Light (IRE) 2003	Uncharted Haven (GB); 1997	Tochar Ban	Assert
Dam Faraday Light (IRE) 2003	Uncharted Haven (GB); 1997	Tochar Ban	Guest Night (Family: 10-c)
