= Harbour Law =

British-bred Thoroughbred racehorse

- Racing silks of Jackie Cornwell
- Sire: Lawman
- Grandsire: Invincible Spirit
- Dam: Abunai
- Damsire: Pivotal
- Sex: Stallion
- Foaled: 30 March 2013
- Country: Ireland
- Colour: Bay
- Breeder: Hascombe and Valiant Studs
- Owner: Jackie Cornwell, Daniel "Danny" Lee
- Trainer: Jo Crowley; Laura Mongan
- Record: 8: 3-2-1
- Earnings: £474,481

Major wins
- St Leger Stakes (2016)

Harbour Law (foaled 30 March 2013) is a British Thoroughbred racehorse. Unraced as a two-year-old he showed steady improvement in 2016, winning two minor races and finishing second in the Queen's Vase before recording a 22/1 upset victory in the St Leger. In the following year he finished third in the Ascot Gold Cup but his racing career was ended by injury shortly afterwards.

== Background ==
Harbour Law is a bay colt with a white star, bred by Anthony Oppenheimer's Hascombe and Valiant Studs. As a yearling in November 2014 the colt was offered for sale at Tattersalls but was not sold as he failed to reach his reserve price of £24,000. As two-year-old, Harbour Law was again put up for auction at Goffs in June 2015 and was bought for £30,000 by Kiltown Bloodstock. The colt entered the ownership of Jackie Cornwell and was sent into training with Jo Crowley at Whitcombe, Dorset.

He is from the fifth crop of foals sired by Lawman who won the Prix du Jockey Club and the Prix Jean Prat in 2006. His other progeny have included Most Improved, Marcel and Just The Judge (Irish 1000 Guineas and E. P. Taylor Stakes). Harbour Law's dam Abunai showed some ability as a racehorse, winning three times as a two-year-old in 2006, and was a granddaughter of the Child Stakes winner Inchmurrin.

== Racing career ==
=== 2016: three-year-old season ===
Harbour Law made his racecourse debut in a maiden race over one and half miles on the synthetic Polytrack surface at Lingfield Park Racecourse on 18 March. Ridden by Sean Levey he started a 20/1 outsider and finished second, one and a half lengths behind Shoofly and twenty lengths clear of the other three finishers. Harbour Law was subsequently moved to the stable of Laura Mongan at Epsom. On 1 May the colt made his first appearance on turf when he started at odds of 4/1 in a maiden over the same distance at Salisbury Racecourse. Ridden by George Baker who became his regular jockey, he took the lead two furlongs out and won by two and three quarter lengths from Forth Bridge. Eighteen days after his win at Salisbury Harbour Law was moved up in distance for a handicap over fourteen furlongs at Sandown Park Racecourse in which he was allotted top weight of 133 pounds. He disputed the lead from the start and drew ahead of his opponents in the closing stages to win by 1 1/2 lengths.

On 17 June, the colt was moved up in class and distance for the Listed Queen's Vase over two miles at Royal Ascot. Starting at odds of 8/1 in an eighteen-runner field he was amongst the leaders from the start and stayed on well in the straight to finish second, three quarters of a length behind the 33/1 outsider Sword Fighter. On 7 July Harbour Law contested the Group 3 Bahrain Trophy over thirteen furlongs at Newmarket Racecourse. After taking the lead approaching the last quarter mile he was overtaken in the closing stages and finished fourth of the nine runners behind the Aidan O'Brien-trained Housesofparliament.

On 10 September Harbour Law, partnered by Baker started a 22/1 outsider in a nine-runner field for the 240th running of the St Leger Stakes over 14 1/2 furlongs at Doncaster Racecourse. Idaho started the odds-on favourite whilst the other runners included Sword Fighter, Housesofparliament, Ventura Storm (Prix de Reux) and the John Gosden-trained Muntahaa. After racing towards the rear of the field Harbour Law began to make steady progress in the straight, by which point Idaho had unseated his jockey. Housesofparliament and Ventura Storm appeared to have the race between them but Harbour Law produced a strong late run to gain the advantage in the final strides and won by three quarters of a length. Ventura Storm took second by a short head from Housesofparliament with a gap of ten lengths back to Muntahaa in fourth. Laura Monagan, who became the first woman to train a St Leger winner said "It was brilliant. I think I screamed a lot. I'm in shock. I'm so glad we came here and he's proved that he can do it. We didn't want to ride him like that, but George knows what he's doing and all credit to him. We knew we could leave it to him. It was a really professional performance by the horse, we knew he'd go somewhere in life. It proves we can do it with the ammunition. It's great to have a horse like this and bring him here for a race like this".

=== 2017: four-year-old season ===
Harbour Law began his second campaign in the Group 3 Sagaro Stakes over two miles at Ascot on 3 May. Ridden by Tom Queally he never looked likely to challenge and came home last of the seven runners behind the five-year-old mare Sweet Sensation. On 22 June 2017 at the same track Harbour Law was partnered by Jim Crowley when he went off a 33/1 outsider for the Group 1 Ascot Gold Cup over two and half miles ran. He was always among the leaders, moved into second place three furlongs from the finish and despite being unable to make further progress he stayed on well to finish third behind Big Orange and Order of St George.

On the day after the Gold Cup Harbour Law was found to have sustained a tendon injury which kept him off the course for the rest of the year. He remained in training the following year but never raced again.

== Stud record ==
Harbour Law was retired from racing in 2018 and began his career as a breeding stallion at the Batsford Stud in Gloucestershire in 2019 at a fee of £4,000.

== Pedigree ==
Pedigree of Harbour Law (GB), bay colt 2013
Sire Lawman (FR) 2004	Invincible Spirit (IRE); 1997	Green Desert	Danzig
Sire Lawman (FR) 2004	Invincible Spirit (IRE); 1997	Green Desert	Foreign Courier
Sire Lawman (FR) 2004	Invincible Spirit (IRE); 1997	Rafha	Kris
Sire Lawman (FR) 2004	Invincible Spirit (IRE); 1997	Rafha	Eljazzi
Sire Lawman (FR) 2004	Laramie (USA); 1994	Gulch	Mr. Prospector
Sire Lawman (FR) 2004	Laramie (USA); 1994	Gulch	Jameela
Sire Lawman (FR) 2004	Laramie (USA); 1994	Light The Lights	Shirley Heights
Sire Lawman (FR) 2004	Laramie (USA); 1994	Light The Lights	Lighted Glory
Dam Abunai (GB) 2004	Pivotal (GB); 1993	Polar Falcon	Nureyev
Dam Abunai (GB) 2004	Pivotal (GB); 1993	Polar Falcon	Marie d'Argonne
Dam Abunai (GB) 2004	Pivotal (GB); 1993	Fearless Revival	Cozzene
Dam Abunai (GB) 2004	Pivotal (GB); 1993	Fearless Revival	Stufida
Dam Abunai (GB) 2004	Ingozi (GB); 1991	Warning	Known Fact
Dam Abunai (GB) 2004	Ingozi (GB); 1991	Warning	Slightly Dangerous
Dam Abunai (GB) 2004	Ingozi (GB); 1991	Inchmurrin	Lomond
Dam Abunai (GB) 2004	Ingozi (GB); 1991	Inchmurrin	On Show (Family: 7-a)
