= Elusive Kate =

American-bred Thoroughbred racehorse

- Racing silks of Teruya Yoshida
- Sire: Elusive Quality
- Grandsire: Gone West
- Dam: Gout de Terroir
- Damsire: Lemon Drop Kid
- Sex: Filly
- Foaled: 10 February 2009
- Died: April 2015 (Aged 6)
- Country: United States
- Colour: Bay
- Breeder: Clovelly Farms
- Owner: Teruya Yoshida
- Trainer: John Gosden
- Record: 16:7-2-2
- Earnings: £846,197

Major wins
- Prix Six Perfections (2011); Prix du Calvados (2011); Prix Marcel Boussac (2011); Prix Rothschild (2012, 2013); Falmouth Stakes (2013)

Elusive Kate (10 February 2009 – April 2015) was an American-bred, British-trained Thoroughbred racehorse. She was one of the leading two-year-old fillies in Europe in 2011 when her wins included the Prix du Calvados and the Prix Marcel Boussac. In 2012 she won the Prix Rothschild and was placed in the Falmouth Stakes, Prix Jacques Le Marois, Sun Chariot Stakes and Queen Elizabeth II Stakes. In 2013 she won the Falmouth Stakes and a second Prix Rothschild.

== Background ==
Elusive Kate was a bay filly with a white stripe and a white sock on her right foreleg, bred in Kentucky by Clovelly Farms. She was sired by the leading American stallion Elusive Quality, whose other progeny have included Smarty Jones, Raven's Pass and Quality Road. Elusive Kate's dam, Gout de Terroir was a half-sister to the Breeders' Cup Classic winner Pleasantly Perfect.

As a yearling, Elusive Kate was sent to the Keeneland sales in September, where she was bought for $70,000 by Blandford Bloodstock. The filly was sent to the United Kingdom to be trained by John Gosden at Newmarket, Suffolk.

== Racing career ==
=== 2011: two-year-old season ===
Elusive Kate made her racecourse debut on 4 June 2011 when she finished fourth of the eleven runners behind Falls of Lora in a maiden race at Doncaster Racecourse. Eleven days later she contested a similar event over seven furlongs at Kempton Park. Ridden by William Buick she started the 5/4 favourite, and won by a head from Kinetica.

For her next three races, Elusive Kate was sent to compete in France, beginning with the Prix Six Perfections at Deauville Racecourse on 30 July. Ridden by Olivier Peslier, she won by one and half lengths from Pestagua. Elusive Kate returned to Deauville three weeks later and was moved up in class to contest the Group Three Prix du Calvados over 1400 metres. She started the 19/10 favourite and led from the start to win "comfortably" by one and a half lengths from Mashoora.

On 2 October Elusive Kate faced a field which included Falls of Lora and the Prix d'Aumale winner Zantenda, and the Anglesey Stakes winner Fire Lily in the Prix Marcel Boussac over 1600 metres at Longchamp Racecourse. Ridden by Buick she led from the start and held off challenges from Zantenda and Fire Lily before drawing clear in the closing stages to win by three lengths. On her final appearance the filly was sent to America to contest the Breeders' Cup Juvenile Fillies Turf at Churchill Downs. She started favourite but finished eighth of the fourteen runners behind Stephanie's Kitten.

=== 2012: three-year-old season ===
Elusive Kate did not contest any of the British, French or Irish classic races in the early part of 2012 and did not reappear until the July meeting at Newmarket Racecourse. In the Falmouth Stakes, she was ridden by Frankie Dettori and took the lead in the last quarter mile before finishing second to Giofra. The beaten fillies included Siyouma, Maybe and Golden Lilac. Two weeks later, she returned to Deauville for the Group One Prix Rothschild. Leading from the start, she was never seriously challenged and won "comfortably" from Golden Lilac. On 12 August, Elusive Kate raced against colts for the first time in the Prix Jacques Le Marois over 1600 metres at Deauville. She led until the last 200 metres and finished third behind Excelebration and Cityscape, beaten one and a quarter lengths and a neck. The beaten horses included Moonlight Cloud, Golden Lilac, Most Improved, Fallen for You and Immortal Verse.

Elusive Kate returned to England for the Sun Chariot Stakes over one mile at Newmarket on 29 September. Her chances were compromised when she stumbled exiting the stalls, but she recovered to finish second to Siyouma. On her final appearance of the season, Elusive Kate finished third to Excelebration and Cityscape in the Queen Elizabeth II Stakes at Ascot Racecourse.

=== 2013: four-year-old season ===
On her first appearance as a four-year-old, Elusive Kate contested the Queen Anne Stakes at Royal Ascot on 18 June, a race for which the 2011 Kentucky Derby winner Animal Kingdom started favourite. The filly took the lead two furlongs from the finish but weakened in the closing stages to finish fourth of the twelve runners behind Declaration of War, with Animal Kingdom in eleventh.

On 12 July at Newmarket's July Course, only four horses lined up in the Falmouth Stakes, including the 2012 winner, Giofra and Sky Lantern who had won the 1,000 Guineas Stakes and Coronation Stakes. Elusive Kate went on to win by one quarter of a length. There was, however, a Stewards Enquiry following an incident where Elusive Kate hung badly to the left and her jockey, William Buick, hit Sky Lantern in the face with his whip. The result remained unaltered but Buick picked up a three-day ban for careless riding. After the enquiry, Buick said, "on the day she was the best horse, and it's just unfortunate that she did hang left as it would have been nice to see her do it in a straight line". The connections of Sky Lantern appealed against the stewards' decision, but the result was upheld by the British Horseracing Authority's disciplinary panel on 18 July. On 28 July Elusive Kate was sent to Deauville to contest her second Prix Rothschild, despite her trainer's concerns about the soft ground. Starting at odds of 19/10 she took the lead 400 metres from the finish and won easily by two and a half lengths from the Irish filly Duntle. On 11 August, Elusive Kate ran for the second time in the Prix Jacques Le Marois. After racing prominently for most of the way but faded in the closing stages to finish seventh behind Moonlight Cloud.

After a seven-week break, Elusive Kate returned to racing on 28 September, when she was again matched against Sky Lantern in the Sun Chariot Stakes over one mile at Newmarket. The field also included Duntle, the Irish 1000 Guineas winner Just The Judge and the Matron Stakes winner La Collina. She raced just behind the leaders, but after briefly taking the lead two furlongs from the finish she again hung badly to the left and finished fourth behind Sky Lantern, Integral and Duntle. On her final racecourse appearance she finished fifth behind Olympic Glory in the Queen Elizabeth II Stakes at Ascot on 19 October.

== Assessment and honours ==
In the 2012 edition of the World Thoroughbred Racehorse Rankings, Elusive Kate was given a rating of 116 making her the 170th best racehorse in the world and the tenth-best three-year-old filly.

== Retirement ==
Elusive Kate was retired from racing at the end of 2013 to begin her career a broodmare. She died when giving birth to her first foal in April 2015.

== Pedigree ==
Pedigree of Elusive Kate (USA), bay filly, 2009
Sire Elusive Quality (USA) 1993	Gone West (USA); 1984	Mr. Prospector	Raise a Native
Sire Elusive Quality (USA) 1993	Gone West (USA); 1984	Mr. Prospector	Gold Digger
Sire Elusive Quality (USA) 1993	Gone West (USA); 1984	Secrettame	Secretariat
Sire Elusive Quality (USA) 1993	Gone West (USA); 1984	Secrettame	Tamerett
Sire Elusive Quality (USA) 1993	Touch of Greatness (USA); 1986	Heros Honor	Northern Dancer
Sire Elusive Quality (USA) 1993	Touch of Greatness (USA); 1986	Heros Honor	Glowing Tribute
Sire Elusive Quality (USA) 1993	Touch of Greatness (USA); 1986	Ivory Wand	Sir Ivor
Sire Elusive Quality (USA) 1993	Touch of Greatness (USA); 1986	Ivory Wand	Natashka
Dam Gout de Terroir (USA) 1994	Lemon Drop Kid (USA); 1996	Kingmambo	Mr. Prospector
Dam Gout de Terroir (USA) 1994	Lemon Drop Kid (USA); 1996	Kingmambo	Miesque
Dam Gout de Terroir (USA) 1994	Lemon Drop Kid (USA); 1996	Charming Lassie	Seattle Slew
Dam Gout de Terroir (USA) 1994	Lemon Drop Kid (USA); 1996	Charming Lassie	Lassie Dear
Dam Gout de Terroir (USA) 1994	Regal State (USA); 1983	Affirmed	Exclusive Native
Dam Gout de Terroir (USA) 1994	Regal State (USA); 1983	Affirmed	Won't Tell You
Dam Gout de Terroir (USA) 1994	Regal State (USA); 1983	La Trinite	Lyphard
Dam Gout de Terroir (USA) 1994	Regal State (USA); 1983	La Trinite	Promessa (Family: 16-a)
