= George Baker (jockey) =

British jockey

Personal information
- Occupation: Jockey

Horse racing career
- Sport: Horse racing

Major racing wins
- Major races British Champions Fillies' and Mares' Stakes (2013); St Leger (2016); Prix du Cadran (2016)

Significant horses
- Harbour Law, Premio Loco, Seal of Approval

George Baker is a retired British Classic-winning jockey.

Baker is the son of a farrier from Lambourn. After leaving school, in July 1999, he joined trainer Mark Usher and had his first winner at Wolverhampton on 4 December on Beauchamp Magic. He finished the year with 2 wins from 38 runs. In 2006, he was second in the Oaks on Rising Cross, but his first significant victory came in the Listed Winter Derby Trial in 2007. Later that season he added his first Group race when winning the Group 3 Oak Tree Stakes at Goodwood. At six feet tall, he was one of the tallest flat jockeys in Britain, which considerably restricted his racing opportunities.

Over the next few years, Baker built a very successful partnership with top miler Premio Loco, trained by Chris Wall. On that horse, he won two British Listed races, and two European Group 2s in 2009. In 2010, he added the Group 2 Summer Mile Stakes; in 2011, another Group 2 at Doncaster; then, in 2012, the Winter Derby, a Swedish Group 3, and the Celebration Mile. Other big victories for Baker during this period included Group races on Bated Breath and Mull of Killough. He reached a century of victories in 2008 and 2010, and was runner-up in the 2010/11 all-weather championship season with 47 victories, six behind the champion Luke Morris.

In a bizarre turn of events at Leicester on 23 August 2011, George Baker (jockey), rode (and won) on George Baker (a horse), trained by George Baker (trainer).

On Champions Day 2013, Baker won his first Group 1 - the British Champions Fillies and Mares Stakes on Seal Of Approval for James Fanshawe, a horse on which he had previously won a Listed race at Newbury. The victory helped him break the £1 million prize money mark for the first time.

Big handicap victories came in 2014 in the Victoria Cup (Gabriel's Lad) and Wolferton Handicap at Royal Ascot (Contributor), before another Listed race victory in the Pretty Polly Stakes on Thistle Bird. Numerically this was his best season with 162 winners.

Baker's most successful season in prize money terms was 2016, when he won his first Classic, the St Leger on Harbour Law, and the Prix du Cadran on Quest For More. In total in 2016 he won over £1.7 million in prize money.

His career was abruptly ended in February 2017 by a serious fall at St Moritz's White Turf meeting, when racing on the snow-covered lake. He suffered bleeding on the brain and spent an extended period in a trauma unit, having to learn to walk again, before being allowed to return home in late April. For five weeks afterwards, he had post-traumatic amnesia, and received support from Alice Plunkett whose husband William Fox-Pitt had also suffered a head injury. The incident came at a time when his reputation had never been higher. He announced his retirement on Friday 3 November 2017 in an At The Races interview with Luke Harvey and Jason Weaver, after being told another fall would have dire consequences. "I have kind of known for some time that I wouldn't race-ride again and the confirmation came a couple of weeks ago. Another bang on the head wouldn't be good and in all honesty I think I would have struggled to pass the medical." He spoke of his intention to stay in racing, possibly as a jockey coach.

His career total was 1,364 winners, including more than 100 in a year on six occasions, from 10,188 rides, for a total of £11,834,440 in prize money. He also rode 2,290 places. The trainer he rode most wins for was Gary Moore (200).

He has a wife Nicola and daughter Isabella.

== Statistics by season ==
| Year | Wins | Runs | Strike rate | Total earnings |
|---|---|---|---|---|
| 1999 | 2 | 38 | 5 | £6,446 |
| 2000 | 55 | 621 | 9 | £321,814 |
| 2001 | 23 | 546 | 4 | £215,869 |
| 2002 | 23 | 276 | 8 | £162,488 |
| 2003 | 26 | 315 | 8 | £167,723 |
| 2004 | 40 | 406 | 10 | £226,934 |
| 2005 | 71 | 614 | 12 | £435,685 |
| 2006 | 70 | 508 | 14 | £563,223 |
| 2007 | 75 | 595 | 13 | £504,434 |
| 2008 | 115 | 684 | 17 | £685,578 |
| 2009 | 71 | 629 | 11 | £694,980 |
| 2010 | 102 | 693 | 15 | £642,171 |
| 2011 | 76 | 584 | 13 | £613,723 |
| 2012 | 85 | 628 | 14 | £718,060 |
| 2013 | 109 | 716 | 15 | £1,060,506 |
| 2014 | 162 | 826 | 20 | £1,645,265 |
| 2015 | 123 | 697 | 18 | £1,339,627 |
| 2016 | 114 | 683 | 17 | £1,703,055 |
| 2017 | 22 | 129 | 17 | £126,859 |

== Major wins ==
(United Kingdom) Great Britain

- British Champions Fillies' and Mares' Stakes - Seal of Approval (2013)
- St Leger Stakes - Harbour Law (2016)

France

- Prix du Cadran - Quest For More (2016)

(Republic of Ireland) Ireland

- Pretty Polly Stakes - Thistle Bird (2014)
