= Odeon Tower =

Skyscraper in Monaco

- Tour Odéon
- Interactive map of the Odeon Tower area

General information
- Status: Completed
- Type: Offices, residential (private and State-owned), commercial
- Location: La Rousse/Saint Roman, Monaco
- Coordinates: 43°44′52.77″N 7°25′50.35″E
- Construction started: 2009
- Opening: 2015
- Owner: SCI Odeon, subsidiary of Groupe Marzocco

Height
- Roof: 558 ft (170 m)
- Top floor: 49

Technical details
- Floor count: 49

Design and construction
- Architect: Alexandre Giraldi
- Developer: Groupe Marzocco
- Structural engineer: SNC Lavalin, Coyne et Bellier, Van Santen & Associé, MZA Structural Engineering
- Other designers: Alberto Pinto (interior)
- Main contractor: Vinci Construction France

The Odeon Tower (French: Tour Odéon; Monégasque: Turre Odeu̍n) is a double-skyscraper in the Principality of Monaco. It was the first high-rise in the city-state to be built since the 1980s (high constructions had been abandoned due to aesthetic concerns and criticism of overdevelopment). At 170 metres high, Tour Odeon on its completion was the second tallest building on Europe's Mediterranean coast, after Gran Hotel Bali (186m) in Benidorm, Spain. Had Tour Odeon been built in neighbouring France, it would have been among that country's 10 highest buildings.

This project from Groupe Marzocco was considered by some to be an important renewal of economic development for the second-smallest country in the world. Its construction was launched in the middle of the economic crisis, in 2009. The building was inaugurated in April 2015.

== Background ==
At the end of the 1980s, Prince Rainier III decided to stop building high rises in Monaco, following the construction of some controversial architectural choices. In 2008 his son, Prince Albert II, decided to abandon a polder project (judged as too expensive and too dangerous for surrounding sealife) and build a new high-rise and reformed polder project instead. Both the complex's design and construction was subject to validation by the Urbanism Department of the Principality, and the Prince of Monaco himself.

The construction of the main high-rise was finally voted by the Monegasque Parliament, the National Council, on February 12, 2009.

== Features ==
- height: 170 metres, 49 floors.
- 259 residences, including 62 for-sale private luxury residences (including 2 Sky Duplex apartments of 1,200 m^{2} each and 1 Sky Penthouse of 3,500 m^{2} over 5 floors). 157 lower floor apartments, entered via a separate entrance, are for social housing.
- 10 subterranean levels with 543 parking spaces.
- restaurant and offices.
- wellness centre including spa, a fitness centre and a swimming pool.

The common entrance hall is decorated with wall sculptures of the French artist Mateo Mornar. The private lobby and all the private communal spaces of the tower have been designed by Alberto Pinto.

The building received the High Quality Environmental standard label.

=== Milestones ===
- July–August 2009: Preparation works - In order to create the necessary space, a neighbouring secondary school, the Collège Charles III de Monaco, was modified. One of the playgrounds, situated behind the building and partly on the construction site, was moved onto the roof. The existing seven storey building was therefore raised by an additional floor.
- 4 November 2009 - A priest blesses the building site, thus marking the official start of the construction works. This was a symbolic step in a Principality, strongly steeped in the Catholic faith (in accordance with its Constitution).
- October 2011 - Start of the structural works, completion of the support works.
- January 2012 - Completion of the ground floor.
- December 2012 - Completion of the 25th floor.
- July 2013 - Completion of the structural works.
- March 2014 - Completion of the coating of the building facades.
- October 2014 - Completion of the finishing touches.
- April 2015 - Delivery.

=== Criticism ===
Both the buildings' architecture and the shadows it casts on the cityscape have been criticised since the beginning of the project. In particular, residents of the adjacent French city of Beausoleil have criticised the building for blocking the views and above all diminishing real estate values. An association was created, and the mayor called for discussions between French and Monegasque authorities. The project continued as planned.
