= Gear Up (horse) =

Irish-bred Thoroughbred racehorse

- Racing silks of Teme Valley 2
- Sire: Teofilo
- Grandsire: Galileo
- Dam: Gearanai
- Damsire: Toccet
- Sex: Colt
- Foaled: 8 March 2018
- Country: Ireland
- Colour: Bay
- Breeder: Jim Bolger
- Owner: Teme Valley 2
- Trainer: Mark Johnston; Joseph O'Brien
- Record: 13: 5-1-0
- Earnings: £188,690

Major wins
- Acomb Stakes (2020); Criterium de Saint-Cloud (2020); Ballyroan Stakes (2022)

Gear Up (foaled 8 March 2018) is an Irish-bred Thoroughbred racehorse. He was one of the leading two-year-old colts in Europe in 2020 when he won three of his four races including the Group 3 Acomb Stakes in England and the Group 1 Criterium de Saint-Cloud in France.

== Background ==
Gear Up is a bay horse with a white star with a white sock on his left hind leg bred in Ireland by Jim Bolger. In October 2019 he was consigned to the Goffs Orby Yearling Sale and was bought for €52,000 by the trainer Mark Johnston. He entered the ownership of the Teme Valley 2 syndicate, and was taken into training by Johnston at Middleham Moor, North Yorkshire.

He was from the tenth crop of foals sired by the Teofilo the undefeated European Champion Two-Year-Old of 2006. Teofilo's other European offspring have included Cross Counter, Trading Leather, Pleascach, Twilight Payment and Parish Hall: he has also had great success in Australia where his major winners have included Happy Clapper, Humidor and Kermadec. Gear Up's dam Gearanai showed no racing ability, failing to win or place in six races, but was a granddaughter of the Kentucky Oaks winner Dispute.

== Racing career ==
=== 2020: two-year-old season ===
The 2020 flat racing season in England was disrupted by the COVID-19 pandemic with racing being abandoned from mid-March until June when it was resumed behind closed doors. On 25 July at York Racecourse Gear Up made his racecourse debut over seven furlongs in a novice race (for two-year-olds with no more than two previous wins) and started at odds of 12/1 in a ten-runner field. Ridden by Silvestre de Sousa he was restrained towards the rear in the early stages before overcoming difficulty in obtaining a clear run and overtook the leader Henrik inside the final furlong to win by one and half lengths. The colt was then stepped up in class for the Group 3 Acomb Stakes over the same course and distance on 19 August when he was partnered by De Sousa and started the 9/1 fourth choice in the betting. He was in contention from the start but looked to be outpaced three furlongs out before staying on strongly to gain the advantage in the final strides and won "gamely" by half a length from Spycatcher. After the race Mark Johnston said: "He got loose before he won on his debut and everyone was thinking of him as quite a difficult horse... He was very different in the prelims today – laid back and relaxed... He's not the most impressive horse at home, but we’ve seen his style again today, he looked the first under pressure then found more and more. He wants a mile now and he’s bred to get a mile."

Franny Norton took the ride when Gear Up moved up in class and distance for the Group 2 Royal Lodge Stakes over one mile at Newmarket Racecourse on 26 September when he raced in second place for most of the way but was unable to make any progress in the last quarter mile and came home fourth of the five runners behind New Mandate, Ontario and Cobh, beaten two and a half lengths by the winner. On 24 October the colt was sent to France for the Group 1 Criterium de Saint-Cloud over 2000 metres on heavy ground at Saint-Cloud Racecourse in which he was ridden by James Doyle. He started the 27/1 outsider of the seven-runner field which also included the favourite Makaloun (winner of the Prix de Conde), the filly Tiger Tanaka and the German challenger Best of Lips (Preis des Winterfavoriten). In a change of tactics Gear Up led from the start and repelled several challengers to win by a short neck from his fellow long-shot Botanik. Johnston stated that the colt would be aimed at the following year's Epsom Derby while Doyle commented "He was still a bit green under pressure when we turned into the straight and he just wanted to hang to his left. It took probably half a furlong to get him fully straightened up but once we did, he powered away nicely."

In the official European classification of for 2020 Gear Up was given a rating of 113, making him the twelfth best two-year-old of the season seven pounds behind the top-rated St Mark's Basilica.

=== 2021: three-year-old season ===
Gear Up's second campaign began on 13 May at York when he started at odds of 6/1 for the Dante Stakes and came home fifth of the ten runners behind Hurricane Lane after looking to be outpaced in the closing stages. On 5 June Gear Up was one of eleven colts to contest the 242nd running of the Derby over one and a half miles at Epsom Racecourse and started a 50/1 outsider. He led for most of the way before being overtaken two furlongs out and then quickly dropped away to finish tenth, beaten more that twenty lengths by the winner Adayar. In the King Edward VII Stakes at Royal Ascot two weeks later he was dropped back to Group 2 class and came home fifth behind Alenquer, fading in the closing stages after disputing the lead for most of the way. He was then moved up in distance for the Group 3 Bahrain Trophy over thirteen furlongs at Newmarket in July and led until the last quarter mile before fading and finishing fourth of the five runners behind Yibir.

== Pedigree ==
Pedigree of Gear Up (IRE), bay colt, 2018
Sire Teofilo (IRE) 2004	Galileo (IRE); 1998	Sadler's Wells (USA)	Northern Dancer (CAN)
Sire Teofilo (IRE) 2004	Galileo (IRE); 1998	Sadler's Wells (USA)	Fairy Bridge
Sire Teofilo (IRE) 2004	Galileo (IRE); 1998	Urban Sea (USA)	Miswaki
Sire Teofilo (IRE) 2004	Galileo (IRE); 1998	Urban Sea (USA)	Allegretta (GB)
Sire Teofilo (IRE) 2004	Speirbhean (IRE); 1998	Danehill (USA)	Danzig
Sire Teofilo (IRE) 2004	Speirbhean (IRE); 1998	Danehill (USA)	Razyana
Sire Teofilo (IRE) 2004	Speirbhean (IRE); 1998	Saviour (USA)	Majestic Light
Sire Teofilo (IRE) 2004	Speirbhean (IRE); 1998	Saviour (USA)	Victorian Queen (CAN)
Dam Gearanai (USA) 2007	Toccet (USA); 2000	Awesome Again (CAN)	Deputy Minister
Dam Gearanai (USA) 2007	Toccet (USA); 2000	Awesome Again (CAN)	Primal Force (USA)
Dam Gearanai (USA) 2007	Toccet (USA); 2000	Cozzene's Angel	Cozzene
Dam Gearanai (USA) 2007	Toccet (USA); 2000	Cozzene's Angel	Charming Pan (FR)
Dam Gearanai (USA) 2007	Plaintiff (USA); 1996	Seeking The Gold	Mr Prospector
Dam Gearanai (USA) 2007	Plaintiff (USA); 1996	Seeking The Gold	Con Game
Dam Gearanai (USA) 2007	Plaintiff (USA); 1996	Dispute	Danzig
Dam Gearanai (USA) 2007	Plaintiff (USA); 1996	Dispute	Resolver (Family: 5-f)

- Gear Up was inbred 4 × 4 to Danzig, meaning that this stallion twice in the fourth generation of his pedigree.
