= Tiger Tanaka (horse) =

Irish-bred Thoroughbred racehorse

- Racing silks of Scea Haras Du Ma & John Dwan; Miguel Castro Megias
- Sire: Clodovil
- Grandsire: Danehill
- Dam: Miss Phillyjinks
- Damsire: Zoffany
- Sex: Filly
- Foaled: 20 January 2018
- Country: Ireland
- Colour: Bay
- Breeder: Kellsgrange Stud
- Owner: Scea Haras Du Ma & John Dwan; Miguel Castro Megias
- Trainer: Marc Pimbonnet; Charley Rossi
- Record: 10: 6-0-1
- Earnings: £186,221

Major wins
- Prix Francois Boutin (2020); Prix Marcel Boussac (2020)

Tiger Tanaka (foaled 20 January 2018) is an Irish-bred, French-trained Thoroughbred racehorse. She was one of the best two-year-old fillies in Europe in 2020 when she won six of her eight races including the Prix Francois Boutin and the Prix Marcel Boussac.

== Background ==
Tiger Tanaka is a bay filly with a small white star bred in Ireland by Kellsgrange Stud. As a yearling in September 2019 she was consigned to the Tattersalls Ireland sale and was bought for €6,500 by Pascale Menard. She entered the ownership of Scea Haras Du Ma & John Dwan and was sent into training with Marc Pimbonnet in France. She was named after a character from the James Bond film You Only Live Twice.

She was one of the best horses sired by Clodovil who won the Poule d'Essai des Poulains in 2003. Tiger Tanaka's dam Miss Phillyjinks showed modest racing ability, winning one minor race from sixteen attempts. She was a female-line descendant of the Park Hill Stakes winner Idle Waters, making her a close relative of Only For Life.

== Racing career ==
=== 2020: two-year-old season ===
Tiger Tanaka began her racing career in a claiming race over 1200 metres on heavy ground on 4 June at Lyon Parilly racecourse. Ridden by Guillaume Mandel she started at odds of 10.4/1 and won by a length from Dia de Muertos. After the race she was claimed by the trainer Charley Rossi on behalf of the owner. Miguel Castro Megias. In her seven subsequent races of 2020 she was ridden by Rossi's partner Jessica Marcialis. Nine days after her win at Lyon, on her first appearance for her new connections, the filly started favourite for a claiming race over 1500 metres on the synthetic Polytrack surface at Marseille Pont-de-Vivaux racecourse and won by four lengths from Third Apple. Two weeks later, over the same course and distance, she started odds on favourite for a similar event and won by five lengths. On 8 July Tiger Tanaka returned to the turf for a claimer over 1600 metres at Marseille Borely and extended her winning run to four as she came home two and a half lengths clear of her rivals.

The filly was then stepped up in class to contest the Group 2 Prix Robert Papin over 1200 metres at Chantilly Racecourse on 19 July and sustained her first defeat as she came home third behind the British-trained colts Ventura Tormenta and The Lir Jet. The Group 3 Prix Francois Boutin over 1400 metres on heavy ground at Deauville Racecourse on 16 August saw Tiger Tanaka go off the 1.7/1 joint favourite alongside Unveil in a five-runner field. After being settled in second place by Marcialis in the early stages she took the lead 400 metres from the finish and drew away in the closing stages to win by two lengths from La Gioiosa. Marcialis commented "She did it so easily. I asked myself what was going on two out as there was no challenge. I decided then it was time to go and she quickened beautifully."

On 4 October, Tiger Tanaka was elevated to the highest class for the Prix Marcel Boussac over 1600 metres at Longchamp Racecourse and started the 8/1 fifth choice in the betting for the Group 1 event. The Prix du Calvados winner Fev Rover went off favourite, while the other ten runners included King's Harlequin (Prix d'Aumale), Thunder Beauty (fifth in the Moyglare Stud Stakes), La Gioiosa and the Listed race winners Bonita Queen and Al Siq. She raced in mid-division as La Jonction set the early pace, before moving up to track the leaders 500 metres from the finish. She gained the advantage approaching the last 200 metres and stayed on well in the closing stages to win by three quarters of a length from Tasmania. Marcialis became the first woman to ride a Group 1 race in France was accompanied by her young son as she received the trophy. She said "It's incredible. I don't have words... She was relaxed throughout the race. It's incredible because in all the races I've ridden her, every time she has been different. I've made history. I want to say to all the mums that we can do it. Be strong."

For her final run of the season Tiger Tanaka was moved up again in distance for the 2000 metre Criterium de Saint-Cloud on 24 October and came home fourth behind the colts Gear Up, Botanik and Makaloun, beaten two lengths by the winner.

In the official European classification for 2020 Tiger Tanaka was given a rating of 110, making her the seventh best two-year-old filly of the season.

=== 2021: three-year-old season ===
On 21 March Tiger Tanaka began her second campaign in the Listed Prix le Camargo over 1600 metres at Saint-Cloud when she started favourite but was beaten six lengths into second place by Sweet Lady. In the 1800 metre Prix Vanteaux at Longchamp three weeks later she came home sixth of the ten runners behind Rumi after struggling to obtain a clear run in the straight.

== Pedigree ==
Pedigree of Tiger Tanaka (IRE), bay mare, 2018
Sire Clodovil (IRE) 2000	Danehill (USA); 1986	Danzig	Northern Dancer
Sire Clodovil (IRE) 2000	Danehill (USA); 1986	Danzig	Pas de Nom
Sire Clodovil (IRE) 2000	Danehill (USA); 1986	Razyana	His Majesty
Sire Clodovil (IRE) 2000	Danehill (USA); 1986	Razyana	Spring Adieu
Sire Clodovil (IRE) 2000	Clodora (FR); 1994	Linamix	Mendez
Sire Clodovil (IRE) 2000	Clodora (FR); 1994	Linamix	Lunadix
Sire Clodovil (IRE) 2000	Clodora (FR); 1994	Cloche d'Or	Good Times
Sire Clodovil (IRE) 2000	Clodora (FR); 1994	Cloche d'Or	Chrysicabana
Dam Miss Phillyjinks (IRE) 2013	Zoffany (IRE); 2008	Dansili (GB)	Danehill (USA)
Dam Miss Phillyjinks (IRE) 2013	Zoffany (IRE); 2008	Dansili (GB)	Hasili (IRE)
Dam Miss Phillyjinks (IRE) 2013	Zoffany (IRE); 2008	Tyranny (GB)	Machiavellian (USA)
Dam Miss Phillyjinks (IRE) 2013	Zoffany (IRE); 2008	Tyranny (GB)	Dust Dancer
Dam Miss Phillyjinks (IRE) 2013	Smoken Rosa (USA); 12003	Smoke Glacken	Two Punch
Dam Miss Phillyjinks (IRE) 2013	Smoken Rosa (USA); 12003	Smoke Glacken	Majesty's Crown
Dam Miss Phillyjinks (IRE) 2013	Smoken Rosa (USA); 12003	Roses in the Snow (IRE)	Be My Guest (USA)
Dam Miss Phillyjinks (IRE) 2013	Smoken Rosa (USA); 12003	Roses in the Snow (IRE)	Desert Bluebell (GB) (Family 14-c)

- Tiger Tanaka is inbred 2 × 4 to Danehill, meaning that this stallion appears in both the second and fourth generations of her pedigree.
