= Jessica Marcialis =

Italian jockey

Jessica Marcialis (born 1989 or 1990) is an Italian jockey who competes in Flat racing. Marcialis is based in France and has also ridden in races in Mauritius, Switzerland, the United States and Ireland. In October she became the first female jockey to win a Group One race when taking the Prix Marcel Boussac on Tiger Tanaka, trained by her partner Charley Rossi.

== Major wins ==
France

- Prix Marcel Boussac - (1) - Tiger Tanaka (2020)
