= Claudio Marzocco =

Italian engineer and businessman (born 1959)

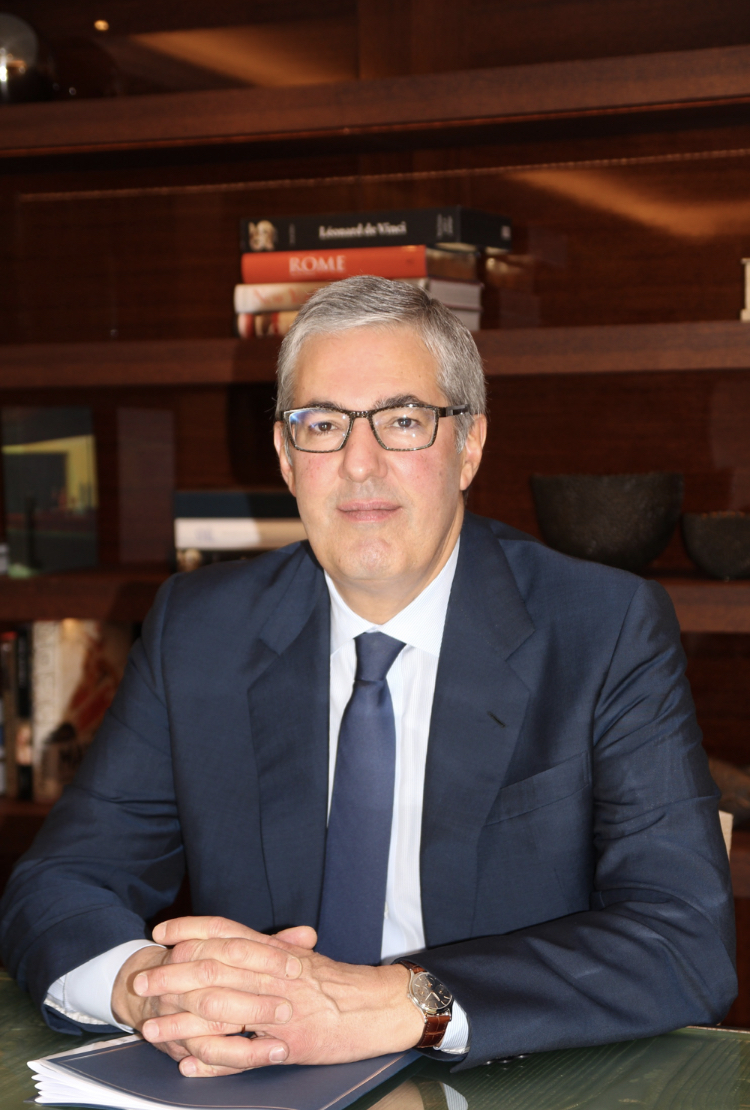
- Born: 21 February 1959 (age 67); Andora, Italy
- Education: University of Padova
- Occupations: CEO, Groupe Marzocco

Claudio Marzocco (born 21 February 1959) is an Italian engineer and businessman. He is the chief executive officer (CEO) of Groupe Marzocco, one of the leading real estate development companies in Monaco.

== Education and early career ==
In 1983, Marzocco graduated from the University of Padova with a civil engineering diploma and started working as an engineer in the construction sector in Italy. In 1988, he was kidnapped for two weeks by the Calabria-based mafia 'Ndrangheta. Claudio Marzocco managed to escape the kidnappers after 15 days of abduction. “A week later, my whole family moved to Monaco where we found security for both ourselves and our business”, he said during an interview with French magazine L’Express.

== Groupe Marzocco ==
Groupe Marzocco was founded in the 1960s by Domenico Marzocco, father of Claudio Marzocco. The same year Claudio Marzocco was kidnapped, after moving to Monaco, he established Groupe Marzocco in Monaco, which was soon oriented as a real estate development company specializing in luxury buildings. Groupe Marzocco, which is fully owned and managed by members of the Marzocco family, is now considered one of Monaco's leading real-estate development companies.

Claudio Marzocco describes his mission as "implementing the technological, environmental and esthetically pleasing formulas that will contribute to the ever growing influence of Monaco". He has been the company's Chief Executive Officer since 2007. His brothers Luca Marzocco, Claudio’s sons Daniele and Niccolò, as well as his nephew Domenico Della Bella are also board members.

== Projects ==
=== Testimonio II ===
The Groupe Marzocco has been chosen, with Vinci and in collaboration with the architects Alexandre Giraldi, Laura Sessa and Arquitectonica, to build the 150 000 m² ensemble with two towers. The first tower; which will include the international school of Monaco, 348 state-owned flats (apart from private flats), a day-nursery, 59 luxury residences amongst which 5 villas; is set to be delivered in 2022.

The luxury part, named Bay House, is due to be finished in 2024.

=== Tour Odéon (2014) ===
The Tour Odéon (Odeon Tower) is the tallest building in Monaco and one of the tallest ever built in Europe. It is a 170-meter high double skyscraper located in the neighborhood of La Rousse-Saint-Roman in Monte Carlo. It includes private apartments, business quarters and offices of the Principality public services.

The Tour Odéon project, a 49-storey building, was launched in 2009 and has been conceived as a full-service luxury building.

=== Ilôt Rainier III (2012) ===
Ilôt Rainier III is the largest real estate development project of the 21st century in Monaco. The 4 building project gathers 243 apartments as well as a parking space.

It was the first building in Monaco to receive the High Environmental Quality Certification. It also received the THPE 2005 Label for very high energy performance, delivered to Prince Albert on 2 May 2013.

=== Les Gaumates (2010) ===
Les Gaumates is a luxury residential building located at 1, Boulevard Princesse Charlotte in Monaco.

The building is an 8-storey villa in the Belle Epoque architectural style, with a view of the Monte Carlo bay.

=== Other projects ===
Among other projects:

- Le Saint-André
- Le Suffren
- Le Cirius
- Le Roc-Azur
- Le Sea Club
- Villa De Rome
- Villa Hermosa
- Villa Montjoie
- Villa Bromar
- Ilôt Canton (in progress)
- Le Tamaris (in progress)

== Horse racing ==
Claudio Marzocco owns a professional racing stable with more than forty horses. His most successful horse is Lawman. Lawman won the Prix du Jockey Club and the Prix Jean Prat in 2007. Since being retired to stud he has made a good start as a stallion: siring Group 1 winners Most Improved, Just the Judge and Law Enforcement. Lawman was trained by Jean-Marie Béguigné. Lawman was awarded an official rating of 120 for his win in the Prix Jean Prat, ranking him as the joint 34th best racehorse in the world in 2007.

== Social activities ==
Claudio Marzocco is an active member of several prestigious social organizations in Monaco such as the Monte Carlo Yacht Club, the Monte-Carlo Country Club, the Automobile Club of Monaco, the Monte Carlo Golf Club or the Monaco Ambassadors Club.

== Decorations ==
- Chevalier de l’Ordre de Saint-Charles (Monaco) in 2006
- Officier de l’Ordre de Saint-Charles (Monaco) in 2014
- Premio “Foglio d’Oro 2008”
- Cavaliere dell’Ordine della “Stella d’Italia” (Italy) in 2013
- Commandeur de Mérite avec Plaque de l’Ordre Sacré et Militaire Constantinien de Saint-Georges (Monaco) in 2013
- Ufficiale dell’Ordine della "Stella d’Italia" in 2020.
- Commander of the Order of Merit of the Italian Republic.

== Controversy ==
On 14 February 2012, Claudio Marzocco was indicted in France, along with his brother Paolo, in an alleged corruption scandal involving a local politician from Beausoleil (France).

The Regional Court of Marseille, by its judgement of 27 January 2017, acquitted Claudio Marzocco and Paolo Marzocco.
