= Six Perfections (horse) =

French-bred Thoroughbred racehorse

- Sire: Celtic Swing
- Grandsire: Damister
- Dam: Yogya
- Damsire: Riverman
- Sex: Filly
- Foaled: 2000
- Country: France
- Colour: Black
- Breeder: Niarchos family
- Owner: Flaxman Holdings
- Trainer: Pascal Bary
- Record: 14: 6-6-1
- Earnings: £1,171,422

Major wins
- Prix Marcel Boussac (2002); Prix du Calvados (2002); Prix Imprudence (2003); Prix Jacques Le Marois (2003); Breeders' Cup Mile (2003)

Awards
- European Champion Two-Year-Old Filly (2002)

Honours
- Prix Six Perfections named in her honour
- Last updated on 24 September 2023

Six Perfections (foaled 2000 in France) is a champion Thoroughbred race horse, bred by the Niarchos family. She is best known for her 2003 win in the Breeders' Cup Mile.

== Background ==
Yogya, Six Perfections' dam, is a half sister of to two-time Breeders Cup Mile winner Miesque. Celtic Swing, Six Perfections' sire, had many group one wins, including a first in the Prix du Jockey Club (French Derby).

== Racing career ==
Six Perfections was trained by Pascal Bary and finished in third or better in thirteen of her fourteen starts, including a 2nd in the 1,000 Guineas.

For her performance in the 2002 racing season Six Perfections earned the Cartier Award for Two-Year-Old European Champion Filly.

Six Perfections ran in her second Breeders Cup mile in October 2004, where she finished 3rd. Following this race, the horse was retired to broodmare duties, was mated to Storm Cat and subsequently produced a bay colt. The colt was named Planet Five and won the Prix du Gros Chêne in 2010.

In the Eclipse Awards for 2003, Six Perfections finished runner-up in the poll for American Champion Three-Year-Old Filly beaten two votes by the Kentucky Oaks winner Bird Town.

== Legacy ==
She was dam of four winners - Planet Five (2006), a bay colt by Storm Cat who won three races including the Group 2 Prix du Gros Chêne at Chantilly, Faufiler (2011), a bay filly by Galileo, who won five races including the Grade 3 Modesty Handicap at Arlington Park and Mount Everest (2016), also by Galileo, who won the Listed Trigo Stakes at Leopardstown. Her top rated offspring was Yucatan (2014), another Galileo colt, who won the Group 2 Herbert Power Stakes at Caulfield in Australia.

The Group 3 Prix Six Perfections at Deauville is named in her honour. She died in 2019 at the age of 19.

== Pedigree ==
Pedigree of Six Perfections
Sire Celtic Swing	Damister	Mr Prospector	Raise a Native
Sire Celtic Swing	Damister	Mr Prospector	Gold Digger
Sire Celtic Swing	Damister	Batucada	Roman Line
Sire Celtic Swing	Damister	Batucada	Whistle a Tune
Sire Celtic Swing	Celtic Ring	Welsh Pageant	Tudor Melody
Sire Celtic Swing	Celtic Ring	Welsh Pageant	Picture Light
Sire Celtic Swing	Celtic Ring	Pencuia Jewel	Petingo
Sire Celtic Swing	Celtic Ring	Pencuia Jewel	Fotheringay
Dam Yogya	Riverman	Never Bend	Nasrullah
Dam Yogya	Riverman	Never Bend	Lalun
Dam Yogya	Riverman	River Lady	Prince John
Dam Yogya	Riverman	River Lady	Nile Lily
Dam Yogya	Pasadoble	Prove Out	Graustark
Dam Yogya	Pasadoble	Prove Out	Equal Venture
Dam Yogya	Pasadoble	Santa Quilla	Sanctus
Dam Yogya	Pasadoble	Santa Quilla	Neriad
