= Marcel (horse) =

Irish-bred Thoroughbred racehorse

- Racing silks of Paul Hancock
- Sire: Lawman
- Grandsire: Invincible Spirit
- Dam: Mauresmo
- Damsire: Marju
- Sex: Colt
- Foaled: 25 March 2013
- Country: Ireland
- Colour: Bay
- Breeder: David Hyland
- Owner: Paul Hancock
- Trainer: Peter Chapple-Hyam
- Record: 4: 2-0-0
- Earnings: £117,495

Major wins
- Racing Post Trophy (2015)

Marcel (foaled 25 March 2013) is an Irish-bred, British-trained Thoroughbred racehorse. He won two of his three starts as a juvenile in 2015 including the Racing Post Trophy. After failing in the 2000 Guineas on his only run of 2016 he was retired from racing.

== Background ==
Marcel is a dark bay colt with a white sock on his left hind leg, bred by David Hyland at the Oghill House Stud in County Kildare. He is from the fifth crop of foals sired by Lawman who won the Prix du Jockey Club and the Prix Jean Prat in 2006. His other progeny have included Most Improved and Just The Judge (Irish 1000 Guineas and E. P. Taylor Stakes). His dam Mauresmo was unraced daughter of Absaar, a half-sister to At Talaq.

Marcel was offered for sale as a foal at Goffs in November 2003 and was bought for €50,000 by the bloodstock agent Mick Flanagan. In October 2014 the yearling returned to the sales ring at Tattersalls and was sold for 26,000 guineas to Troy Steve Bloodstock. The colt entered the ownership of Paul Hancock and was sent into training with Peter Chapple-Hyam at Newmarket, Suffolk.

== Racing career ==
=== 2015: two-year-old season ===
Marcel made his first appearance in a seven furlong maiden race at Ascot Racecourse on 11 July in which he started a 16/1 outsider and finished fifth behind Ray's The Bar. The colt reappeared on 31 August in a similar event at Newcastle Racecourse and started the 7/4 joint-favourite against seven opponents. Ridden by James Doyle he took the lead approaching the final furlong and went clear of the field to win by three and three quarter lengths.

For his third and final start as a juvenile, Marcel was stepped up sharply in class for the Racing Post Trophy over one mile at Doncaster Racecourse on 24 October. The Royal Lodge Stakes winner Foundation started favourite whilst Marcel was the 33/1 outsider in the seven runner field. The other runners included Deauville (Tyros Stakes), Johannes Vermeer (Juvenile Turf Stakes) and the highly regarded maiden winner Mengli Khan. After being restrained by Andrea Atzeni in the early stages, Marcel made rapid progress and overtook Deauville to take the lead a furlong and a half from the finish. He stayed on well in the closing stages to win by one and a half lengths from Johannes Vermeer with Foundation two and a half lengths back in third place. After the race Chapple-Hyam commented "I thought we would be placed but I didn't really see us beating John Gosden's horse (Foundation). He is a big horse and he has taken time to come together. His work had been really good coming into the race".

=== 2016: three-year-old season ===
On his first appearance as a three-year-old, Marcel contested the 2000 Guineas over the Rowley mile at Newmarket on 30 April. After encouraging reports of his training performances he started the 8/1 third favourite but after being in contention for most of the way he faded badly in the final quarter mile and finished last of the thirteen runners behind Galileo Gold. He never raced again and was retired from racing at the end of the year.

== Stud record ==
Marcel began his career as a breeding stallion at the National Stud before moving to the Anngrove Stud at Mountmellick, County Laois in 2019.

== Pedigree ==
Pedigree of Marcel (IRE), bay colt 2013
Sire Lawman (FR) 2004	Invincible Spirit (IRE); 1997	Green Desert	Danzig
Sire Lawman (FR) 2004	Invincible Spirit (IRE); 1997	Green Desert	Foreign Courier
Sire Lawman (FR) 2004	Invincible Spirit (IRE); 1997	Rafha	Kris
Sire Lawman (FR) 2004	Invincible Spirit (IRE); 1997	Rafha	Eljazzi
Sire Lawman (FR) 2004	Laramie (USA); 1994	Gulch	Mr. Prospector
Sire Lawman (FR) 2004	Laramie (USA); 1994	Gulch	Jameela
Sire Lawman (FR) 2004	Laramie (USA); 1994	Light The Lights	Shirley Heights
Sire Lawman (FR) 2004	Laramie (USA); 1994	Light The Lights	Lighted Glory
Dam Mauresmo (IRE) 2004	Marju (IRE); 1988	Last Tycoon	Try My Best
Dam Mauresmo (IRE) 2004	Marju (IRE); 1988	Last Tycoon	Mill Princess
Dam Mauresmo (IRE) 2004	Marju (IRE); 1988	Flame of Tara	Artaius
Dam Mauresmo (IRE) 2004	Marju (IRE); 1988	Flame of Tara	Welsh Flame
Dam Mauresmo (IRE) 2004	Absaar (USA); 1987	Alleged	Hoist the Flag
Dam Mauresmo (IRE) 2004	Absaar (USA); 1987	Alleged	Princess Pout
Dam Mauresmo (IRE) 2004	Absaar (USA); 1987	My Nord	Vent du Nord
Dam Mauresmo (IRE) 2004	Absaar (USA); 1987	My Nord	My Alison (Family: 1-c)
