= Matéo Mornar =

French sculptor of contemporary art (born 1946)

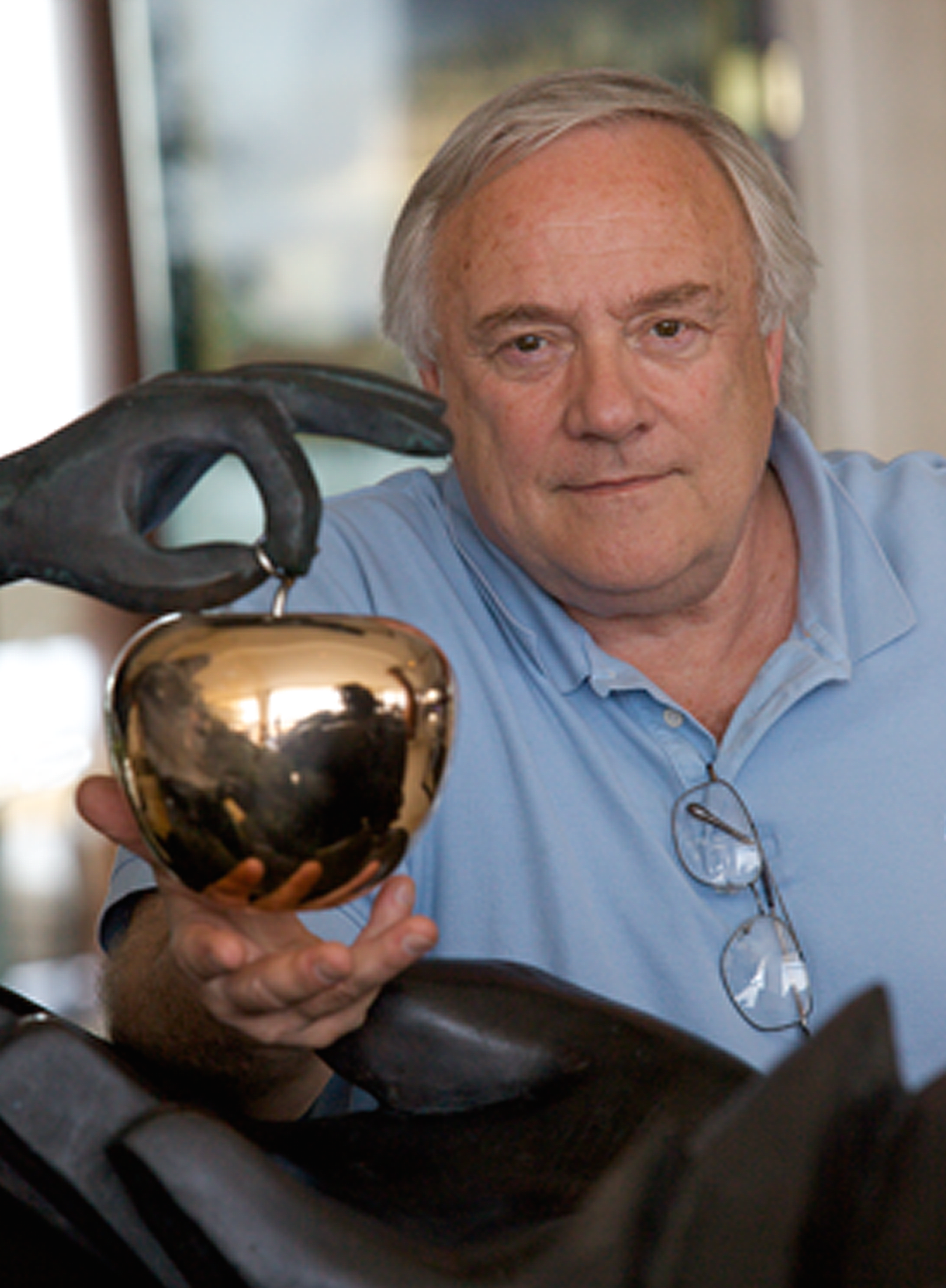
- Photographic portrait of Matéo Mornar (2010)
- Born: Matéo Mornar; 20 December 1946 (age 79); Split, Croatia
- Education: École supérieure des arts modernes, ESAM Paris
- Known for: Sculpture, architecture, design, jewellery
- Notable work: Hymne à la vie Poisson fontaine Récréation; Hippopotame; Pégase

Matéo Mornar (born 20 December 1946) is a French sculptor of contemporary art. He lives and works in the Principality of Monaco.

== Biography ==
Born in Croatia in 1946, Matéo Mornar emigrated to France with his family at the age of ten. They settled in Paris. The young boy liked to spend time in the Louvre, especially in the sections dedicated to sculpture. At 18 he entered the École supérieure des arts modernes (ESAM Paris) school of modern art, where he studied design, graphic design, interior decoration and sculpture techniques. He graduated amongst the top of his class and joined a branch of the Publicis group. He worked for 3 years dedicated to developing scale model which are displayed at trade fair and the moved on to work as a freelancer. For many years, he worked in the area of publishing, graphic creation and interior decoration. An assignment took him to the French Riviera in 1977 where he decided to settle.

At the end of the eighties, he envisioned and conceptualized his first sculptures after a meeting with the artist Antoniucci Volti at Villefranche-sur-Mer.

In 1995, Mornar decided to devote himself entirely to sculpture and began to exhibit in the French Riviera (Cannes, Nice, Monaco...) his early works of bronze women.

In 1997, he opened a school of sculpture in Nice wishing to introduce to people the difficult art of sculpture and to inspire them.

== Association ==
Mornar met the Grimaldi at the end of the 1980s in Monaco. Prince Rainier III much appreciate the artist and regularly visited his exhibitions. He affectionately called him "mon petit Croate !". The Prince Rainier lll; art lover and discerning collector purchased several of his works for his private collection.

In 2005, his son Prince Albert II succeeded him as the head of the Principality of Monaco. He created in 2006 the Foundation Prince Albert ll of Monaco dedicated to environmental protection and sustainable development.

Since 2009, Mornar has collaborated with the Prince Albert II of Monaco Foundation to whom he donates a part of the benefices of his sales. The two men maintain a close relationship driven by a common aim to preserve the environment and particularly the endangered species.

Many sculptures of the artist ornate the gardens of the Principality. On a more personal basis, Matéo Mornar for the occasion of the princely wedding in 2011, created a silver sculpture representing the Prince Albert II and Charlene of Monaco, as well as bronze replicas to decorate the wedding's cakes.

== Exhibitions ==
=== 2014 ===
- Out of Time - Host Art Residence, Bruges – from 24 January till 16 April 2014.

=== 2013 ===
- Sculpture; Life; Passion, 5th Moscow Biennale of Contemporary Art, Zurab Tsereteli Gallery, Moscow - October 2013.

2012

- Journée de l'Art-bre unveiling and exhibition of the Bear - Parc des Oliviers, Roquebrune-Cap-Martin - from 8th till 30 September 2012.

2011

- L'espace Expositions - Gallerie du service Culturel - Beausoleil - Season 2011/2012.
- Exhibition Matéo Mornar - Hotel Splendide Royal Lugano, Switzerland - March 2011.

2010

- Monegasque Exhibition Hall - World Expo 2010, Shanghai - from 1 May till 31 October 2010.

2007

- Exhibition Matéo Mornar - Fairmont Monte-Carlo and Café de Paris Monte-Carlo, Monaco.

2005

- International Contemporary Art Fair - Europ'Art (renamed Art Genève) - Palexpo, Geneva.

2004

- International Contemporary Art Fair - Europ'Art (renamed Art Genève) - Palexpo, Geneva.
- International Artexpo - New York City

== Events and associate artworks ==
2015

A tribute to the Catholic baptism of Prince Albert II of Monaco and Princess Charlene's twins; Prince Jacques and Princess Gabriella of Monaco, Mornar created a bronze sculpture representing the letters "J" and "G" and a dove carrying an olive branch, symbol of peace. The sculpture was presented on the steps of the Saint Nicholas Cathedral of Monaco at the end of the religious ceremony.

Mornar created three large wall sculptures "the Poet, the Lyra and the Flute" in reference to poetry, singing and music of ancient Greece. They are on permanent display in the lobby of the Odeon Tower, double skyscraper located in Monaco.

2014

For the 66th edition of the Gala of the Monegasque Red Cross, Mornar created "Gaia", a painted wood and plastic sculpture. Gaia is the goddess of the hearth, nature and harvests in Greek mythology. Her open arms symbolize hospitality and generosity.

2013

Mornar created the trophy of the '"Award Monte-Carlo Woman of the year" which aim to distinguish women from around the world for their personal of professional action. He produced two sculptures in bronze with a green and blue patina.

An auction sales was organised during the Monaco Classic Week; a prestigious nautical gathering of classic ship. The Poisson Fontaine (Fish Fountain) in bronze of Matéo Mornar won the top prize estimated at 250.000 to 300.000 euros.

2012

Alberti ARTS organized a tribute to the Minitel on Saturday 30th of juin 2012; day which the Minitel's network stopped transmission. For this Minitel Revival, thirty artists including Matéo Mornar, Patrick Moya, Zivo as well as Sacha Sosno immortalised this mythical object into an artwork. Those artworks were put up for auction and the benefices of this event were donated to Fight Aids Monaco, association for the fight against Aids, chaired by Princess Stéphanie of Monaco.

2011

A tribute to the marriage of Prince Albert II and Princess Charlene, Mornar created an unprecedented sculpture, a copy made in silver was offered to them. Twenty other pieces were published in bronze and placed on the wedding's cakes.

In collaboration with the jeweler Ciribelli Monte-Carlo, Mornar decided to turn some of his sculptures into jewellery. One of which was the prize of the prestigious Grand Golden Jackpot Contest of Monte Carlo Casino.

2009

Mornar was the artist of the Palmes de la Com' 2009. He created a trophy in bronze who reward the best advertising campaign of the year.

2006

Madame Augier, Director of the Hotel Negresco in Nice, bought him one of his larger pieces for display in the sumptuous royal hotel lounge alongside other pieces of contemporaries artists such as Niki de Saint Phalle or Raymond Moretti.

1998

Mornar created for the town of Nice, the Stèle du souvenir in memory of the victims of the crash of Air France Flight 1611 - Caravelle Ajaccio - Nice in 1968.

== Philosophy ==
Mornar is an artist passionate about his work, he is into perpetual creation, transformation and looking for novelty. The women's body which he cherishes and respects infinitely, blooms in his originals creations with their graceful plumpness curves, full of tenderness and love. They are an absolute tribute to the Woman who is an inexhaustible source of inspiration for him.

The sculptor also illustrates himself through a unique bestiary make of predators, one hippopotamus 4 meters long and weighing more than 1 tonne (the biggest one ever made in bronze), one turtle, one rhinoceros... Endangered animals on a murky planet which Matéo Mornar genuine desire to protect and preserve (see also association with the Prince Albert II of Monaco Foundation). After an artistic period dedicated to voluptuous curves, Matéo Mornar's style has evolved to cubic shapes, rough edges, harshness, incisive lines. An art nearly aggressive whose the Tiger, the Bear and the Taurus are the first icons.

Mornar is also, thanks to his formation, a creator in the space. For a couple of years he launched into projects of monumental realisations where art is a force for peace in the world. He imagines and designs the buildings of the future.

== Charity ==
- Art for Philippines, auction sales for the benefit of Philippines to help rebuilding the country after Typhoon Haiyan, with the support of the AMADE Mondiale, 3 February 2014.
- The house of Life, during the world day of fight against Aids; private sales intended to raise money to build quality places to live for the patients. Organized by the non-profit association Fight Aids Monaco chaired by Princesses Caroline of Hanover. 1 December 2012.
- Foundation Prince Albert ll of Monaco; dedicated to the environment protection and sustainable development. Collaboration since 2009.
