= Prix Six Perfections =

Flat horse race in France

- Class: Group 3
- Location: Deauville Racecourse; Deauville, France
- Inaugurated: 2010
- Race type: Flat / Thoroughbred
- Website: france-galop.com

Race information
- Distance: 1,400 metres (7f)
- Surface: Turf
- Track: Right-handed
- Qualification: Two-year-old fillies excluding Group 2 winners
- Weight: 56 kg Penalties; 2 kg for Group 3 winners
- Purse: €56,000 (2020); 1st: €28,000

Prix Six Perfections
2024
Angeal	Royalty Bay	Relaxx

Previous years
2023
Laulne	Classic Flower	Geologist
2022
Sydneyarms Chelsea	Terrestrial	Ipanema Princess
2021
Oscula	Zellie	Daneh

2020-2010
2020
See The Rose	Wedding Dance	Coeursamba
2019
Tropbeau	Alocasia	Kenlova
2018
Beyond Reason	Devant	Spirit Of Brittany
2017
Izzy Bizu	Model	Hergame
2016
Asidious Alexander	Calare	Obedient
2015
Aktoria	Llanita	Manhattan Skyline
2014
Tigrilla	My Year Is A Day	Malicieuse
2013
Lacarolina	So In Love	Stormyra
2012
Discernable	Khadima	Sheistheboss
2011
Elusive Kate	Pestagua	Dear Lavinia
2010
Helleborine	Zabeel Park	Militante

The Prix Six Perfections is a Group 3 flat horse race in France open to two-year-old thoroughbred fillies. It is run at Deauville over a distance of 1,400 metres (about 7 furlongs) each year in late July or early August.

== History ==
The event is named after Six Perfections, a successful filly whose victories included Deauville's Prix Jacques Le Marois in 2003. It was established in 2010, and initially held Listed status.

The Prix Six Perfections was promoted to Group 3 level in 2018.

== Records ==
Leading jockey (2 wins):

- Olivier Peslier – Elusive Kate (2011), Tigrilla (2014)
- Ioritz Mendizabal – Discernable (2012), Izzy Bizu (2017)
- Ryan Moore - Oscula (2021), Sydneyarms Chelsea (2022)

Leading trainer (2 wins):

- Mark Johnston – Discernable (2012), Izzy Bizu (2017)
- André Fabre - Tropbeau (2019), See The Rose (2020)

Leading owner:

- no owner has won this race more than once

== Winners ==
Year	Winner	Jockey	Trainer	Owner	Time
2010	Helleborine	Stéphane Pasquier	Criquette Head-Maarek	Khalid Abdullah	1:27.60
2011	Elusive Kate	Olivier Peslier	John Gosden	Magnolia Racing / Hood	1:25.50
2012	Discernable	Ioritz Mendizabal	Mark Johnston	Hamdan bin M. Al Maktoum	1:27.61
2013	Lacarolina	Grégory Benoist	Jean-Claude Rouget	Carli / Augustin-Normand	1:25.27
2014	Tigrilla	Olivier Peslier	Roger Varian	Cheveley Park Stud	1:27.17
2015	Aktoria	Christophe Soumillon	Carlos Laffon-Parias	Leonidas Marinopoulos	1:27.09
2016	Asidious Alexander	Maxime Guyon	Simon Crisford	Noel O'Callaghan	1:27.94
2017	Izzy Bizu	Ioritz Mendizabal	Mark Johnston	Lowther Racing / Savill	1:27.55
2018	Beyond Reason	Tony Piccone	Charlie Appleby	Godolphin	1:25.73
2019	Tropbeau	Mickael Barzalona	André Fabre	Lady Bamford	1:29.43
2020	See The Rose	Pierre-Charles Boudot	André Fabre	Mulryan / Shanahan / Magnier	1:24.20
2021	Oscula	Ryan Moore	George Boughey	Nick Bradley Racing 20	1:26.47
2022	Sydneyarms Chelsea	Ryan Moore	Charlie Hills	Cornthrop Bs & Sydney Arms Chelsea	1:24.07

== See also ==
- List of French flat horse races
