= Sulk (Canadian band) =

- Origin: Toronto, Ontario, Canada
- Genres: Pop rock, dance-pop
- Years active: 1995–2001
- Labels: SMP Music Productions; Hibias Records; Attic; Fabs Music; Robbins Entertainment; BMG
- Website: smpmusicproductions.com

Sulk was a Canadian pop/rock/dance music group featuring vocalist Sherrie Lea (Laird) and producer/songwriter Blair O'Halloran.

== History ==
Sulk was formed in 1996 in Toronto, Ontario. Soon after, the pair independently released a self-titled album.

The group recorded two full-length CDs and one EP. The group created videos which aired on Much Music and Much More Music. Sulk's song "Don't Tell Me", which won songwriting awards in Canada. Sulk's best-known single was the dance track "Only You", which was regularly played in dance clubs internationally in 2001.

After the release of their final CD, Sherrie Lea continued releasing dance tracks for Hi-Bias Records. Later, Sherrie Lea became the vocalist of the rock group Pandamonia. .

Blair O’Halloran has released 3 albums and 1 Ep under the moniker of Blare Dare starting in 2022. The latest album “Keep Breathing” was released November 1st, 2024.

== Discography ==
=== Albums ===
- Sulk (1996)
- Don't Tell Me (1998)
- Only You (2000)

=== Singles ===
- "Don't Tell Me" (1998)
- "Only You" (2000 in Canada/2001 in U.S. and internationally)
