= Prix Marcel Boussac =

Flat horse race in France

Prix Marcel Boussac Critérium des Pouliches
- Class: Group 1
- Location: Longchamp Racecourse; Paris, France
- Inaugurated: 1969
- Race type: Flat / Thoroughbred
- Sponsor: Qatar
- Website: france-galop.com

Race information
- Distance: 1,600 metres (1 mile)
- Surface: Turf
- Track: Right-handed
- Qualification: Two-year-old fillies
- Weight: 56 kg
- Purse: €400,000 (2021); 1st: €228,560

Prix Marcel Boussac
2026
| Green Empress | Data | Queen Of The Day |

Previous years
2025
Diamond Necklace | Green Spirit | Narissa
2024
Vertical Blue | Zarigana | Exactly
2023
Opera Singer | Rose Bloom | Les Pavots
2022
Blue Rose Cen | Gan Teorainn | Never Ending Story
2021
Zellie | Times Square | Oscula

2020-2011
2020
Tiger Tanaka | Tasmania | Rougir
2019
Albigna | Marieta | Flighty Lady
2018
Lily's Candle | Matematica | Star Terms
2017
Wild Illusion | Polydream | Mission Impassible
2016
Wuheida | Promise To Be True | Dabyah
2015
Ballydoyle | Turret Rocks | Qemah
2014
Found | Ervedya | Jack Naylor
2013
Indonesienne | Lesstalk In Paris | Queen Catrine
2012
Silasol | Topaze Blanche | Alterite
2011
Elusive Kate | Fire Lily | Zantenda

2010-2001
2010
Misty For Me | Helleborine | Rainbow Springs
2009
Rosanara | On Verra | Joanna
2008
Proportional | Elusive Wave | Copperbeech
2007
Zarkava | Conference Call | Mad About You
2006
Finsceal Beo | Darrfonah | Legerete
2005
Rumplestiltskin | Quiet Royal | Deveron
2004
Divine Proportions | Titian Time | Fraloga
2003
Denebola | Green Noon | Tulipe Royale
2002
Six Perfections | Etoile Montante | Luminata
2001
Sulk | Danseuse D'Etoile | Kournakova

2000-1991
2000
Amonita | Karasta | Choc Ice
1999
Lady Of Chad | New Story | Lady Vettori
1998
Juvenia | Crystal Downs | Blue Cloud
1997
Loving Claim | Isle De France | Plaisir Des Yeux
1996
Miss Tahiti | Shake The Yoke | Solar Crystal
1996
Ryafan | Yashmak | Family Tradition
1995
Miss Tahiti | Shake The Yoke | Solar Crystal
1994
Macoumba | Piquetnol | Chrysalu
1993
Sierra Madre | Flagbird | Mehthaaf
1992
Gold Splash | Kindergarten | Love Of Silver
1991
Culture Vulture | Hatoof | Verveine

1990-1982
1990
Shadayid | Caerlina | Sha Tha Ex Sabana
1989
Salsabil | Houseproud | Alchi
1988
Mary Linoa | Rose De Crystal | Reine Du Ciel
1987
Ashayer | Riviere d'Or | Harmless Albatross
1986
Miesque | Milligram | Sakura Reiko
1985
Midway Lady | Fieldy | Riverbride
1984
Triptych | Silvermine | Coup de Folie
1983
Almeira | Masarika | Feerie Boreale
1982
Goodbye Shelley | Mysterieuse Etoile | L'Attrayante

The Prix Marcel Boussac is a Group 1 flat horse race in France open to two-year-old thoroughbred fillies. It is run at Longchamp over a distance of 1,600 metres (about 1 mile), and it is scheduled to take place each year in early October.

It is France's only Group 1 event exclusively for juvenile fillies. The leading participants usually become major contenders for the following year's fillies' Classics.

== History ==
The event was established in 1969, and it was originally called the Critérium des Pouliches. The best two-year-old fillies had previously competed against male horses in the Grand Critérium.

The race was given its present title in 1980, in memory of Marcel Boussac (1889–1980). Boussac was a highly successful owner/breeder, and he served as chairman of the sport's former governing body in France, the Société d'Encouragement.

The Prix Marcel Boussac took place on Longchamp's middle course (moyenne piste) until 1986. It was switched to the main course (grande piste) in 1987.

The race is held on the same day as the Prix de l'Arc de Triomphe. The fixture is usually staged on the first Sunday in October.

== Records ==
Leading jockey (3 wins):

- Lester Piggott – Vela (1969), Play It Safe (1981), Midway Lady (1985)
- Yves Saint-Martin – Allez France (1972), Theia (1975), Aryenne (1979)
- Alain Lequeux – Tropicaro (1980), Triptych (1984), Mary Linoa (1988)
- Willie Carson – Ashayer (1987), Salsabil (1989), Shadayid (1990)
- Olivier Peslier – Miss Tahiti (1995), Lady Of Chad (1999), Silasol (2012)

Leading trainer (6 wins):

- Aidan O'Brien – Rumplestiltskin (2005), Misty for Me (2010), Found (2014), Ballydoyle (2015), Opera Singer (2023), Diamond Necklace (2025)

Leading owner (5 wins): (includes part ownership)

- Michael Tabor - Rumplestiltskin (2005), Misty For Me (2010), Found (2014), Ballydoyle (2015), Diamond Necklace (2025)
- Susan Magnier – Rumplestiltskin (2005), Misty For Me (2010), Found (2014), Ballydoyle (2015), Diamond Necklace (2025)

== Winners ==
| Year | Winner | Jockey | Trainer | Owner | Time |
|---|---|---|---|---|---|
| 1969 | Vela | Lester Piggott | Richard Carver, Jr. | S. Sokolov | 1:40.30 |
| 1970 | Two to Paris | Jean-Claude Desaint | John Cunnington, Jr. | L. P. Doherty | 1:42.10 |
| 1971 | Dark Baby | Georges Doleuze | Jean Laumain | Maurice Fournier | 1:39.50 |
| 1972 | Allez France | Yves Saint-Martin | Albert Klimscha | Daniel Wildenstein | 1:38.00 |
| 1973 | Hippodamia | Bill Pyers | Maurice Zilber | Nelson Bunker Hunt | 1:43.00 |
| 1974 | Oak Hill | Y. Josse | Georges Bridgland | Mrs Serge Houyvet | 1:47.80 |
| 1975 | Theia | Yves Saint-Martin | Raymond Touflan | S. de Lopez-Tarragoya | 1:44.30 |
| 1976 | Kamicia | F. Flachi | Jean Laumain | Mrs Henri Rabatel | 1:49.70 |
| 1977 | Tarona | Philippe Paquet | François Boutin | Gerry Oldham | 1:41.90 |
| 1978 | Pitasia | Alfred Gibert | Aage Paus | Sir Douglas Clague | 1:48.30 |
| 1979 | Aryenne | Yves Saint-Martin | John Fellows | D. G. Volkert | 1:41.30 |
| 1980 | Tropicaro | Alain Lequeux | Maurice Zilber | Benjamin Coates | 1:43.40 |
| 1981 | Play It Safe | Lester Piggott | François Boutin | Diana Firestone | 1:46.90 |
| 1982 | Goodbye Shelley | John Lowe | Steve Norton | Mrs S. R. Brook | 1:47.40 |
| 1983 | Almeira | Dominique Vincent | J. C. Cunnington | Countess Batthyany | 1:38.80 |
| 1984 | Triptych | Alain Lequeux | David Smaga | Alan Clore | 1:46.70 |
| 1985 | Midway Lady | Lester Piggott | Ben Hanbury | Harry Ranier | 1:37.90 |
| 1986 | Miesque | Freddy Head | François Boutin | Stavros Niarchos | 1:37.50 |
| 1987 | Ashayer | Willie Carson | John Dunlop | Hamdan Al Maktoum | 1:37.40 |
| 1988 | Mary Linoa | Alain Lequeux | David Smaga | David Smaga | 1:41.20 |
| 1989 | Salsabil | Willie Carson | John Dunlop | Hamdan Al Maktoum | 1:40.30 |
| 1990 | Shadayid | Willie Carson | John Dunlop | Hamdan Al Maktoum | 1:40.70 |
| 1991 | Culture Vulture | Richard Quinn | Paul Cole | Chris Wright | 1:40.60 |
| 1992 | Gold Splash | Gérald Mossé | Criquette Head | Jacques Wertheimer | 1:44.90 |
| 1993 | Sierra Madre | Gérald Mossé | Pascal Bary | Jean-Louis Bouchard | 1:45.40 |
| 1994 | Macoumba | Freddy Head | Criquette Head | Haras d'Etreham | 1:43.80 |
| 1995 | Miss Tahiti | Olivier Peslier | André Fabre | Daniel Wildenstein | 1:40.20 |
| 1996 | Ryafan | Frankie Dettori | John Gosden | Khalid Abdullah | 1:39.80 |
| 1997 | Loving Claim | Olivier Doleuze | Criquette Head | Maktoum Al Maktoum | 1:37.60 |
| 1998 | Juvenia | Olivier Doleuze | Criquette Head | Wertheimer et Frère | 1:43.00 |
| 1999 | Lady of Chad | Olivier Peslier | Richard Gibson | John Martin | 1:44.90 |
| 2000 | Amonita | Thierry Jarnet | Pascal Bary | Mrs Paul de Moussac | 1:36.30 |
| 2001 | Sulk | Frankie Dettori | John Gosden | James Wigan | 1:43.00 |
| 2002 | Six Perfections | Thierry Thulliez | Pascal Bary | Niarchos Family | 1:37.90 |
| 2003 | Denebola | Christophe Lemaire | Pascal Bary | Niarchos Family | 1:40.90 |
| 2004 | Divine Proportions | Christophe Lemaire | Pascal Bary | Niarchos Family | 1:36.70 |
| 2005 | Rumplestiltskin | Kieren Fallon | Aidan O'Brien | Magnier / Tabor et al. | 1:37.30 |
| 2006 | Finsceal Beo | Kevin Manning | Jim Bolger | Michael Ryan | 1:34.90 |
| 2007 | Zarkava | Christophe Soumillon | Alain de Royer-Dupré | HH Aga Khan IV | 1:37.00 |
| 2008 | Proportional | Stéphane Pasquier | Criquette Head-Maarek | Khalid Abdullah | 1:36.00 |
| 2009 | Rosanara | Christophe Soumillon | Alain de Royer-Dupré | HH Aga Khan IV | 1:37.20 |
| 2010 | Misty for Me | Johnny Murtagh | Aidan O'Brien | Tabor / Smith / Magnier | 1:42.50 |
| 2011 | Elusive Kate | William Buick | John Gosden | Magnolia Racing / Hood | 1:38.10 |
| 2012 | Silasol | Olivier Peslier | Carlos Laffon-Parias | Wertheimer et Frère | 1:44.62 |
| 2013 | Indonesienne | Flavien Prat | Christophe Ferland | Wertheimer et Frère | 1:38.74 |
| 2014 | Found | Ryan Moore | Aidan O'Brien | Tabor / Smith / Magnier | 1:37.45 |
| 2015 | Ballydoyle | Ryan Moore | Aidan O'Brien | Tabor / Smith / Magnier | 1:35.44 |
| 2016 | Wuheida (Note: The 2016 & 2017 runnings took place at Chantilly while Longchamp was closed for redevelopment) | William Buick | Charlie Appleby | Godolphin | 1:35.85 |
| 2017 | Wild Illusion | James Doyle | Charlie Appleby | Godolphin | 1:37.47 |
| 2018 | Lily's Candle | Pierre-Charles Boudot | Fabrice Vermeulen | Martin S Schwartz Racing | 1:38.98 |
| 2019 | Albigna | Shane Foley | Jessica Harrington | Niarchos family | 1:41.26 |
| 2020 | Tiger Tanaka | Jessica Marcialis | Charley Rossi | Miguel Castro Megias | 1:43.13 |
| 2021 | Zellie | Oisin Murphy | André Fabre | Al Wasmiyah Farm | 1:42.67 |
| 2022 | Blue Rose Cen | Aurelien Lemaitre | Christopher Head | Yeguada Centurion SL | 1:40.45 |
| 2023 | Opera Singer | Ryan Moore | Aidan O'Brien | Tabor / Smith / Magnier / Westerberg | 1:36.40 |
| 2024 | Vertical Blue | Alexis Pouchin | Francis Henri Graffard | Gemini Stud & Argella Racing | 1:38.60 |
| 2025 | Diamond Necklace | Christophe Soumillon | Aidan O'Brien | Tabor / Smith / Magnier / Westerberg | 1:41.31 |
| 2026 | Green Empress | Christophe Soumillon | Joseph O'Brien | The Thoroughbred Racing Corp | 1:37.02 |

== See also ==
- List of French flat horse races
- Recurring sporting events established in 1969 – this race is included under its original title, Critérium des Pouliches.
