= Sulk (horse) =

Irish-bred Thoroughbred racehorse

- Sire: Selkirk
- Grandsire: Sharpen Up
- Dam: Masskana
- Damsire: Darshaan
- Sex: Mare
- Foaled: 1999
- Country: Ireland
- Colour: Chestnut
- Breeder: James Wigan
- Owner: James Wigan
- Trainer: John Gosden
- Record: 11-2-2-1

Major wins
- Prix Marcel Boussac (2001)

Sulk was a thoroughbred racehorse. She was born in 1999 and won two races in 2001, including France's prestigious Prix Marcel Boussac, and placed as a three-year-old in the Nassau Stakes, Yorkshire Oaks, and the Prix Royal-Oak. She was trained by John Gosden, and after finishing her racing career was a broodmare until she died in 2009 of colic.
