= Hot Snap =

British-bred Thoroughbred racehorse

- Racing colours of Khalid Abdullah
- Sire: Pivotal
- Grandsire: Polar Falcon
- Dam: Midsummer
- Damsire: Kingmambo
- Sex: Mare
- Foaled: 29 March 2010
- Country: United Kingdom
- Colour: Chestnut
- Breeder: Juddmonte Farms
- Owner: Khalid Abdulla
- Trainer: Henry Cecil; Lady Cecil
- Record: 6: 2-1-1
- Earnings: £88,485

Major wins
- Nell Gwyn Stakes (2013)

Hot Snap (foaled 29 March 2010) is a British Thoroughbred racehorse who won the Nell Gwyn Stakes in 2013.

== Background ==
Hot Snap is a chestnut filly with a narrow white blaze bred by her owner Khalid Abdulla's Juddmonte Farms Inc. As a daughter of the broodmare Midsummer, she is a half sister to the Breeders' Cup Filly & Mare Turf winner Midday.

== Racing career ==
=== 2012: two-year-old season ===
Hot Snap made her first appearance in a one-mile maiden race at Kempton Park Racecourse on 19 September. Ridden by Eddie Ahern, she started at odds of 7/1 and won by half a length from Mango Diva.

=== 2013: three-year-old season ===
On her three-year-old debut, Hot Snap contested the Group Three Nell Gwyn Stakes at Newmarket Racecourse in which she was ridden by Tom Queally. She took the lead approaching the final furlong and won by two and a quarter lengths from the Moyglare Stud Stakes winner Sky Lantern. On 5 May Hot Snap started favourite for the 1000 Guineas at Newmarket's Rowley Mile course but finished ninth of the fifteen runners behind Sky Lantern.

Hot Snap did not run again until the Nassau Stakes at Goodwood Racecourse on 3 August in which she finished third behind the 20/1 outsider Winsili. On 14 September Hot Snap was sent to Ireland for the Group Two Blandford Stakes at the Curragh. She started the 5/4 favourite and finished strongly to take second place, one and three quarter lengths behind the four-year-old Belle de Crecy. On her final appearance of the season, Hot Snap ran in the British Champions Fillies' and Mares' Stakes for which she started the 7/2 co-favourite alongside Talent and Dalkala. She was never in contention and finished fifth behind Seal of Approval.

== Pedigree ==
Pedigree of Hot Snap (GB), chestnut filly, 2010
Sire Pivotal (GB) 1993	Polar Falcon; 1987	Nureyev	Northern Dancer*
Sire Pivotal (GB) 1993	Polar Falcon; 1987	Nureyev	Special
Sire Pivotal (GB) 1993	Polar Falcon; 1987	Marie d'Argonne	Jefferson
Sire Pivotal (GB) 1993	Polar Falcon; 1987	Marie d'Argonne	Mohair
Sire Pivotal (GB) 1993	Fearless Revival; 1987	Cozzene	Caro
Sire Pivotal (GB) 1993	Fearless Revival; 1987	Cozzene	Ride The Trails
Sire Pivotal (GB) 1993	Fearless Revival; 1987	Stufida	Bustino
Sire Pivotal (GB) 1993	Fearless Revival; 1987	Stufida	Zerbinetta
Dam Midsummer (GB) 2000	Kingmambo; 1990	Mr. Prospector	Raise a Native
Dam Midsummer (GB) 2000	Kingmambo; 1990	Mr. Prospector	Gold Digger
Dam Midsummer (GB) 2000	Kingmambo; 1990	Miesque	Nureyev
Dam Midsummer (GB) 2000	Kingmambo; 1990	Miesque	Pasadoble
Dam Midsummer (GB) 2000	Modena; 1983	Roberto	Hail to Reason
Dam Midsummer (GB) 2000	Modena; 1983	Roberto	Bramalea
Dam Midsummer (GB) 2000	Modena; 1983	Mofida	Right Tack
Dam Midsummer (GB) 2000	Modena; 1983	Mofida	Wold Lass (Family: 9-e)
