= Lawman (horse) =

French-bred Thoroughbred racehorse

- Sire: Invincible Spirit
- Grandsire: Green Desert
- Dam: Laramie
- Damsire: Gulch
- Sex: Stallion
- Foaled: 9 May 2004
- Country: France
- Colour: Bay
- Breeder: Petra Bloodstock Agency
- Owner: Claudio Marzocco; Enrico Ciampi; Ballylinch Stud
- Trainer: Jean-Marie Béguigné
- Jockey: Kieren Fallon; Olivier Peslier; Frankie Dettori
- Record: 7: 4–1–0

Major wins
- Prix de Guiche (2007); Prix du Jockey Club (2007); Prix Jean Prat (2007)

Lawman (foaled 9 May 2004) is a French Thoroughbred racehorse. As a three-year-old in 2007 he won the Prix du Jockey Club and Prix Jean Prat. Since being retired to stud he has made a good start as a stallion, siring Group 1 winners Most Improved, Just The Judge and Law Enforcement. Lawman was trained by Jean-Marie Béguigné and owned by Claudio Marzocco and Enrico Ciampi.

== Background ==
Lawman is a bay horse bred by Petra Bloodstock Agency and foaled on 9 May 2004. He was sired by Invincible Spirit, a sprinter who won the Duke of York Stakes and Haydock Sprint Cup in 2002. Since retiring from racing he has become one of Ireland's leading stallions, siring Fleeting Spirit, Kingman, Mayson, Moonlight Cloud and Vale of York. Lawman's dam is Laramie, a daughter of Gulch who raced in two maiden races, finishing seventh and fourth. Lawman was purchased as a yearling for €75,000 and was trained in France by Jean-Marie Béguigné.

== Racing career ==
Lawman made his racecourse debut on 12 November 2006 in 1600-metre contest for unraced two-year-olds at Saint-Cloud. He won the race, which was his only start as a two-year-old, beating Vespucci by two lengths. Lawman's first race as a three-year-old was the Prix Machado, a 1600-metre race run at Longchamp on 29 March 2007. He finished the race in third place, two and a half lengths behind winner Chichi Creasy and one length behind runner up Brooklyn Boy. However the second and third placing were reversed, moving Lawman up to second place. In the Prix de Fontainebleau, Lawman was held up at the rear of the field by jockey Olivier Peslier. He ran on in the final 300 metres and took fourth place near the finish, with the race being won by Chichi Creasy. In the Prix de Guiche on 9 May 2007, Lawman set the pace and quickened clear in the finishing straight to win easily by two and a half lengths from Holocene, who just beat Chinese Whisper and Hurricane Fly to finish second.

Lawman's easy win in the Prix de Guiche made him one of the favourites for the Prix du Jockey Club on 3 June 2007, when he was ridden for the only time by Frankie Dettori. As in his previous he led from the start and was driven along by Dettori 300 metres from the finish. He ran on well to win the race by one and a half lengths from second placed Literato. Shamdinan and Zambezi Sun finished just behind the runner-up in third and fourth place respectively. Lawman was ridden by Olivier Peslier again when he stepped back down in distance for the Prix Jean Prat on 8 July. As in his previous two races, Lawman was sent into an early lead by Peslier. He quickened clear 300 metres out and won easily by three lengths from Stoneside. Golden Titus was one and a half lengths behind Stoneside in third place, with pre-race favourite Astronomer Royal finishing fourth. In the Prix Jacques Le Marois about one month later, Lawman was near the front of the field for much of the race, but was out of contention with about 300 metres still to run. He eventually finish last of the six runners, approximately 13 lengths behind winner Manduro. Lawman was then being aimed at the Irish Champion Stakes and Prix de l'Arc de Triomphe, but got an infection, causing his liver enzymes to rise, and was retired.

== Assessment ==
Lawman was awarded an official rating of 120 for his win in the Prix Jean Prat, ranking him as the joint 34th best racehorse in the world in 2007.

== Stud career ==
Upon retirement, Lawman was purchased by Ballylinch Stud and syndicated into 45 shares, with Ciampi and Marzocco retaining part ownership. He now stands as a stallion at Ballylinch Stud in Thomastown, County Kilkenny, Ireland for a stud fee of €25,000. His most notable progeny to date are:

- Forces Of Darkness – a bay mare foaled in 2009. In 2012 she finished third in the Prix Saint-Alary and fourth in the Prix de Diane, before winning the Prix Minerve.
- Most Improved – a bay horse foaled in 2009 who, after finishing third in the Dewhurst Stakes as a two-year-old, went on to win the St James's Palace Stakes as a three-year-old. He now stands as a stallion at Coolmore Stud for a stud fee of €6,000.
- Just The Judge – a brown filly foaled in 2010. She was undefeated as a two-year-old in 2012, including a win in the Rockfel Stakes. She started 2013 by finishing second in the 1000 Guineas and then winning the Irish 1,000 Guineas. At Royal Ascot that year she finished third in the Coronation Stakes. She stayed in training as a four-year-old, finishing third in the Pretty Polly Stakes.
- Law Enforcement – a bay gelding foaled in 2010 who won the 2012 Gran Criterium.
- Us Law – a grey gelding who won the Prix Thomas Bryon and finished third in the Critérium International as a two-year-old.
- Marcel, a bay colt who won the Racing Post Trophy.
- Harbour Law, a bay colt who won the St Leger.

== Pedigree ==
Pedigree of Lawman, bay stallion, 2004
Sire Invincible Spirit (IRE) b. 1997	Green Desert (USA) b. 1983	Danzig b. 1977	Northern Dancer
Sire Invincible Spirit (IRE) b. 1997	Green Desert (USA) b. 1983	Danzig b. 1977	Pas de Nom
Sire Invincible Spirit (IRE) b. 1997	Green Desert (USA) b. 1983	Foreign Courier b. 1979	Sir Ivor
Sire Invincible Spirit (IRE) b. 1997	Green Desert (USA) b. 1983	Foreign Courier b. 1979	Courtly Dee
Sire Invincible Spirit (IRE) b. 1997	Rafha (GB) b. 1987	Kris ch. 1976	Sharpen Up
Sire Invincible Spirit (IRE) b. 1997	Rafha (GB) b. 1987	Kris ch. 1976	Doubly Sure
Sire Invincible Spirit (IRE) b. 1997	Rafha (GB) b. 1987	Eljazzi b. 1981	Artaius
Sire Invincible Spirit (IRE) b. 1997	Rafha (GB) b. 1987	Eljazzi b. 1981	Border Bounty
Dam Laramie (USA) b. 1994	Gulch (USA) b. 1984	Mr. Prospector b. 1970	Raise a Native
Dam Laramie (USA) b. 1994	Gulch (USA) b. 1984	Mr. Prospector b. 1970	Gold Digger
Dam Laramie (USA) b. 1994	Gulch (USA) b. 1984	Jameela b. 1976	Rambunctious
Dam Laramie (USA) b. 1994	Gulch (USA) b. 1984	Jameela b. 1976	Asbury Mary
Dam Laramie (USA) b. 1994	Light the Lights (FR) b. 1985	Shirley Heights b. 1975	Mill Reef
Dam Laramie (USA) b. 1994	Light the Lights (FR) b. 1985	Shirley Heights b. 1975	Hardiemma
Dam Laramie (USA) b. 1994	Light the Lights (FR) b. 1985	Lighted Glory b. 1972	Nijinsky
Dam Laramie (USA) b. 1994	Light the Lights (FR) b. 1985	Lighted Glory b. 1972	Lighted Lamp

Note: b. = Bay, ch. = Chestnut
