= Sky Lantern (horse) =

Irish-bred Thoroughbred racehorse

- Racing silks of Simon Keswick
- Sire: Red Clubs
- Grandsire: Red Ransom
- Dam: Shawanni
- Damsire: Shareef Dancer
- Sex: Mare
- Foaled: 27 January 2010
- Country: United Kingdom
- Colour: Grey
- Breeder: Tally-Ho Stud
- Owner: Ben Keswick
- Trainer: Richard Hannon Sr.
- Record: 16: 6-4-0
- Earnings: £801,178

Major wins
- Fillies' Sprint Stakes (2012); Moyglare Stud Stakes (2012); 1000 Guineas (2013); Coronation Stakes (2013); Sun Chariot Stakes (2013)

Sky Lantern is an Irish-bred, British-trained Thoroughbred racehorse. She was one of the leading European two-year-old fillies of 2012 when she won the Moyglare Stud Stakes in Ireland. In May 2013 she won the 200th running of the 1000 Guineas. She followed up with a win in the Coronation Stakes, and recovered from a controversial defeat by Elusive Kate in the Falmouth Stakes to record a fourth Group One win in the Sun Chariot Stakes. She remained in training as a four-year-old but failed to reproduce her best form, finishing unplaced in three races.

== Background ==
Sky Lantern is a grey mare bred in Ireland by the Tally-Ho Stud. She was sired by the Cartier Champion Sprinter Red Clubs who died in 2011. As a yearling in September 2011 the filly was sent to the Goffs Sales where she was bought for €75,000 by the bloodstock agent Ed Sackville of SackvilleDonald. The filly was sent into training with Richard Hannon Sr. at East Everleigh in Wiltshire. She was ridden in all of her races by Richard Hughes.

== Racing career ==
=== 2012: two-year-old season ===
Sky Lantern began her racing career in a six furlong maiden race at Goodwood Racecourse on 24 May 2012. She started evens favourite and won by three and a half lengths from Cruck Realta. Two weeks later she was sent to Ireland where she won the Listed Coolmore Stud EBF Sprint Stakes by half a length from True Verdict. Sky Lantern returned to England in August when she contested the Sweet Solera Stakes over seven furlongs at Newmarket and finished second, a length behind the European Champion filly Certify. Two weeks later Sky Lantern started odds-on favourite for the Prestige Stakes at Goodwood, but was beaten half a length by the Mick Channon-trained Ollie Olga.

On 19 September, Sky Lantern raced in Ireland for the second time when she was one of thirteen fillies to contest the Group One Moyglare Stud Stakes at the Curragh Racecourse. She was held up by Hughes in the early stages before moving up to take the lead before taking the lead a furlong from the finish and drawing clear to win easily by two and a half lengths. After the race Hughes said that she "absolutely flew away" whilst her trainer's son Richard Hannon Jr. said that ahe would be "a Guineas filly next year". For her final start of the year, Sky Lantern was sent to the United States for the Breeders' Cup Juvenile Fillies Turf at Santa Anita Park on 2 November. She started the 5/2 favourite but finished eighth of the fourteen runners after failing to obtain a clear run in the closing stages. The Racing Post considered her an "unlucky" loser. Sky Lantern finished the year as the equal top-rated Two-Year-Old Filly in Ireland, alongside Viztoria. At the end of her two-year-old racing career Sky Lantern went to Highclere Stud in Berkshire for a holiday.

=== 2013: three-year-old season ===
On her three-year-old debut, Sky Lantern finished second to the Henry Cecil-trained Hot Snap in the Nell Gwyn Stakes over seven furlongs at Newmarket. On 5 May Sky Lantern started at odds of 9/1 for the 200th running of the 1000 Guineas over Newmarket's Rowley Mile course. Hughes settled the filly in the middle of the fifteen runner field before moving up to challenge inside the final furlong. She took the lead 50 yards from the finish and won by half a length from Just The Judge, to give Hughes his first British classic winner.

After a break of seven weeks, Sky Lantern returned for the Coronation Stakes at Royal Ascot in which she was reopposed by Just the Judge, who had won the Irish 1,000 Guineas. The filly was drawn on the wide outside of the seventeen runner field and started at odds of 9/2, being made joint-favourite with Big Break. Hughes settled the filly towards the back of the field and was still in last place turning into the straight, before switching to the outside. Sky Lantern made rapid progress to overtake the entire field and took the lead a furlong from the finish before drawing clear to win by four lengths. Hughes was able to spend the closing stages patting the filly's neck and pulling on her ear. On 12 July Sky Lantern was matched against older fillies for the first time in the Falmouth Stakes at Newmarket's July course. She started favourite at odds of 4/7 but was beaten in a controversial race by the four-year-old Elusive Kate. When Sky Lantern moved up to challenge Elusive Kate in the final quarter mile, the older filly hung to the left, carrying Sky Lantern across the width of the straight, before prevailing by a neck. The result was allowed to stand after a stewards' enquiry, although the winner's jockey William Buick, who appeared to have struck Sky Lantern across the face with his whip, received a three-day ban for careless riding. The connections of Sky Lantern appealed against the stewards' decision, but the result was upheld by the British Horseracing Authority's disciplinary panel on 18 July. Sky Lantern' next race was the Nassau Stakes at Goodwood Racecourse on 3 August. She started favourite but finished unplaced in a rough race in which Hughes failed to obtain a clear run in the straight.

After an eight-week break, Sky Lantern returned to racing on 28 September, when she was again matched against Elusive Kate in the Sun Chariot Stakes over one mile at Newmarket. She started the 7/4 favourite in a field also included Just The Judge, Duntle and La Collina, the winner of the Matron Stakes. Hughes held the filly up at the back of the field before taking the lead in the last furlong and winning comfortably by a length from Integral, with Duntle third and Elusive Kate in fourth. On her final appearance of the season, Sky Lantern was sent to Hong Kong to contest the Hong Kong Mile at Sha Tin Racecourse. She started the 5/1 third favourite but never looked likely to win and was eased down in the closing stages, finishing last of the fourteen runners.

In November, Sky Lantern finished runner-up to Treve in the voting for both Champion Three-year-old Filly and Horse of the Year at the Cartier Racing Awards. Once again Sky Lantern went to Highclere Stud for a winter holiday, before returning to Richard Hannon's Herridge Stables in January 2014.

=== 2014: four-year-old season ===
Sky Lantern did not reappear as a four-year-old until Royal Ascot, where she carried top weight of 131 pounds in the Duke of Cambridge Stakes on 18 June. She made some progress in the straight but was never able to reach the leaders, finishing fifth of the fourteen runners behind Integral. Sky Lantern failed to recover her best form, finishing unplaced behind Integral in both the Falmouth Stakes at Newmarket in July and the Sun Chariot Stakes in October.

== Breeding record ==
At the end of her four-year-olds season Sky Lantern was retired from racing to become a broodmare at Rockcliffe Stud.

- Gentile Bellini, a bay colt, foaled in 2016, sired by Dubawi. Winner.
- Noonday Gun, grey colt (later gelded), 2017, by Dubawi. Winner.
- Snow Lantern, grey filly, 2018, by Frankel. Winner, including the Falmouth Stakes.
- First Emperor, bay colt 2019, by Galileo
- Apolo grey gelding 2020, by Kingman
- Midnight Gun grey colt 2021, by Kingman

== Pedigree ==
Pedigree of Sky Lantern (IRE), grey filly, 2010
Sire Red Clubs (IRE) 2003	Red Ransom (USA); 1987	Roberto	Hail to Reason
Sire Red Clubs (IRE) 2003	Red Ransom (USA); 1987	Roberto	Bramalea
Sire Red Clubs (IRE) 2003	Red Ransom (USA); 1987	Arabia	Damascus
Sire Red Clubs (IRE) 2003	Red Ransom (USA); 1987	Arabia	Christmas Wind (CAN)
Sire Red Clubs (IRE) 2003	Two Clubs (GB); 1996	First Trump	Primo Dominie
Sire Red Clubs (IRE) 2003	Two Clubs (GB); 1996	First Trump	Valika
Sire Red Clubs (IRE) 2003	Two Clubs (GB); 1996	Miss Cindy	Mansingh (USA)
Sire Red Clubs (IRE) 2003	Two Clubs (GB); 1996	Miss Cindy	Iridium
Dam Shawanni (GB) 1993	Shareef Dancer (USA); 1980	Northern Dancer (CAN)	Nearctic
Dam Shawanni (GB) 1993	Shareef Dancer (USA); 1980	Northern Dancer (CAN)	Natalma (USA)
Dam Shawanni (GB) 1993	Shareef Dancer (USA); 1980	Sweet Alliance	Sir Ivor
Dam Shawanni (GB) 1993	Shareef Dancer (USA); 1980	Sweet Alliance	Mrs Peterkin
Dam Shawanni (GB) 1993	Negligent (IRE); 1987	Ahonoora (GB)	Lorenzaccio
Dam Shawanni (GB) 1993	Negligent (IRE); 1987	Ahonoora (GB)	Helen Nichols
Dam Shawanni (GB) 1993	Negligent (IRE); 1987	Negligence (GB)	Roan Rocket
Dam Shawanni (GB) 1993	Negligent (IRE); 1987	Negligence (GB)	Malpractice (Family: 5-h)
