= Prix Jean Prat =

Flat horse race in France

- Class: Group 1
- Location: Deauville Racecourse; Calvados, Normandy, France
- Inaugurated: 1858
- Race type: Flat / Thoroughbred
- Website: france-galop.com

Race information
- Distance: 1,400 metres (7 furlongs)
- Surface: Turf
- Track: Right-handed
- Qualification: Three-year-olds excluding geldings
- Weight: 58 kg Allowances; 1½ kg for fillies
- Purse: €400,000 (2022); 1st: €228,560

Prix Jean Prat
2026
Thesecretadversary	True Love	Nighttime

Previous years
2025
Woodshauna	Maranoa Charlie	The Lion In Winter
2024
Puchkine	Havana Cigar	Beauvatier
2023
Good Guess	Sauterne	Breizh Sky
2022
Tenebrism	Light Infantry	Lusail
2021
Laws Of Indices	Thunder Moon	Midtown

2020-2011
2020
Pinatubo	Lope Y Fernandez	Malotru
2019
Too Darn Hot	Space Blues	Fox Champion
2018
Intellogent	Cascadian	Gustav Klimt
2017
Thunder Snow	Trais Fluors	Gold Luck
2016
Zelzal	Stormy Antarctic	Spectre
2015
Territories	Dutch Connection	Helene Paragon
2014
Charm Spirit	Shifting Power	La Hoguette
2013
Havana Gold	Silverfield	Mondialiste
2012
Aesop's Fables	Gregorian	Coup De Theatre
2011
Mutual Trust	Zoffany	Strong Suit

2010-2001
2010
Dick Turpin	Siyouni	Xtension
2009
Lord Shanakill	Oiseau De Feu	Irian
2008
Tamayuz	Raven's Pass	Rio De La Plata
2007
Lawman	Stoneside	Golden Titus
2006
Stormy River	Kentucky Dynamite	Viva Macau
2005
Turtle Bowl	Starpix	Rocamadour
2004
Bago	Cacique	Ershaad
2003
Vespone	Prince Kirk	Tashkandi
2002
Rouvres	Imtiyaz	Shaanmer
2001
Olden Times	King Of Tara	Denon

2000-1990
2000
Suances	Bach	Pacino
1999
Golden Snake	Slip Stream	Indian Danehill
1998
Almutawakel	Gold Away	Dr Fong
1997
Starborough	Mamalik	Kirkwall
1996
Le Triton	Martiniquais	Blackwater
1995
Torrential	Annus Mirabilis	Labeeb
1994
Millkom	Darnay	Lassigny
1993
Le Balafre	Bigstone	Semillon
1992
Kitwood	Lucky Lindy	Shanghai
1991
Sillery	Balleroy	Nine Carat
1990
Priolo	Satin Wood	Septieme Ciel

The Prix Jean Prat is a Group 1 flat horse race in France open to three-year-old thoroughbred colts and fillies. It is run at Deauville over a distance of 1,400 metres (about 7 furlongs), and it is scheduled to take place each year in early July.

== History ==
The event was established in 1858. It was originally the opening leg of a two-part series called the Prix Biennal. The second leg, for horses aged four or older, was first run in 1859. Both races were staged at Longchamp.

The three-year-olds' division of the Prix Biennal was run over 2,000 metres. For a period it was held in April, and it served as a trial for the Prix du Jockey Club.

Both Prix Biennal races were renamed the Prix Jean Prat in 1940. This was in memory of Jean Prat (1847–1940), a successful racehorse owner and breeder.

The version for three-year-olds was switched to late May or early June in 1961. It was shortened to 1,850 metres in 1962. It was transferred to Chantilly and cut to 1,800 metres in 1967. The present system of race grading was introduced in 1971, and for several years the event held Group 2 status.

The race was promoted to Group 1 level in 1985. From this point the version for older horses was known as the Prix Vicomtesse Vigier. The Prix Jean Prat returned to Longchamp in 1986.

The event returned to Chantilly in 1995, and was cut to 1,600 metres and moved to early July in 2005. The distance was further reduced to 1,400 metres in 2019 and the event was moved to a new home at Deauville.

== Records ==
Leading jockey since 1940 (6 wins):

- Yves Saint-Martin – Jour et Nuit (1964), Silver Shark (1966), Antipode (1974), Earth Spirit (1976), Melyno (1982), Ginger Brink (1983)

Leading trainer since 1940 (5 wins):

- François Mathet – Jour et Nuit (1964), Silver Shark (1966), Maroun (1971), Lightning (1977), Melyno (1982)
- François Boutin – Speedy Dakota (1975), Cresta Rider (1981), Mendez (1984), Baillamont (1985), Priolo (1990)
- André Fabre - Local Talent (1989), Kitwood (1992), Mutual Trust (2011), Aesop's Fables (2012), Territories (2015)

Leading owner since 1940 (5 wins):

- Godolphin – Almutawakel (1998), Aesop's Fables (2012), Territories (2015), Thunder Snow (2017), Pinatubo (2020)

== Winners since 1977 ==
Year	Winner	Jockey	Trainer	Owner	Time
1977	Lightning	Gérard Dubroeucq	François Mathet	Guy de Rothschild	1:49.90
1978	Dom Racine	Lester Piggott	Olivier Douieb	Robert Sangster	1:48.80
1979	Young Generation	Greville Starkey	Guy Harwood	Tony Ward	1:51.10
1980	Night Alert	Lester Piggott	Vincent O'Brien	Robert Sangster	1:48.20
1981	Cresta Rider	Philippe Paquet	François Boutin	Stavros Niarchos	1:50.40
1982	Melyno	Yves Saint-Martin	François Mathet	Stavros Niarchos	1:46.10
1983	Ginger Brink	Yves Saint-Martin	Robert Collet	Albert Yank	1:50.90
1984	Mendez	Cash Asmussen	François Boutin	Philip Niarchos	1:52.80
1985	Baillamont	Cash Asmussen	François Boutin	Stavros Niarchos	1:54.60
1986	Magical Wonder	Cash Asmussen	Georges Mikhalidès	Mahmoud Fustok	1:51.80
1987	Risk Me	Tony Cruz	Paul Kelleway	Lewis Norris	1:56.40
1988	Lapierre	Steve Cauthen	Clive Brittain	Mrs J. M. Khan	1:54.00
1989	Local Talent	Cash Asmussen	André Fabre	Sheikh Mohammed	1:59.50
1990	Priolo	Gérald Mossé	François Boutin	Ecurie Skymarc Farm	1:53.70
1991	Sillery	Dominique Boeuf	Criquette Head	Ghislaine Head	1:51.30
1992	Kitwood	Steve Cauthen	André Fabre	Sheikh Mohammed	1:58.00
1993	Le Balafre	Olivier Peslier	Nicolas Clément	Joseph de Lastours	1:53.10
1994	Millkom	Jean-René Dubosc	Jean-Claude Rouget	Jean-Claude Gour	1:56.00
1995	Torrential	Frankie Dettori	John Gosden	Sheikh Mohammed	1:55.90
1996	Le Triton	Freddy Head	Criquette Head	Maktoum Al Maktoum	1:48.60
1997	Starborough	Frankie Dettori	David Loder	Sheikh Mohammed	1:51.70
1998	Almutawakel	Frankie Dettori	Saeed bin Suroor	Godolphin	1:51.90
1999	Golden Snake	Michael Hills	Barry Hills	Mohamed Obaida	1:54.50
2000	Suances	Gérald Mossé	M. Delcher Sánchez	Jed Cohen	1:53.40
2001	Olden Times	Pat Eddery	John Dunlop	Prince A. A. Faisal	1:48.10
2002	Rouvres	Olivier Doleuze	Criquette Head-Maarek	Alec Head	1:46.50
2003	Vespone	Christophe Lemaire	Nicolas Clément	Ecurie Mister Ess A S	1:47.10
2004	Bago	Thierry Gillet	Jonathan Pease	Niarchos Family	1:46.60
2005	Turtle Bowl	Olivier Peslier	François Rohaut	Berend van Dalfsen	1:36.10
2006	Stormy River	Thierry Thulliez	Nicolas Clément	Ecurie Mister Ess A S	1:37.80
2007	Lawman	Olivier Peslier	Jean-Marie Béguigné	Marzocco / Ciampi	1:41.20
2008	Tamayuz	Davy Bonilla	Freddy Head	Hamdan Al Maktoum	1:37.60
2009	Lord Shanakill	Jim Crowley	Karl Burke	Mogeely Stud / Gittins	1:38.90
2010	Dick Turpin	Richard Hughes	Richard Hannon Sr.	John Manley	1:36.30
2011	Mutual Trust	Maxime Guyon	André Fabre	Khalid Abdullah	1:40.45
2012	Aesop's Fables	Maxime Guyon	André Fabre	Godolphin	1:37.59
2013	Havana Gold	Mickael Barzalona	Richard Hannon Sr.	Qatar Racing Ltd & CSH	1:37.01
2014	Charm Spirit	Olivier Peslier	Freddy Head	Abdullah bin Khalifa Al Thani	1:41.01
2015	Territories	Mickael Barzalona	André Fabre	Godolphin	1:36.12
2016	Zelzal	Grégory Benoist	Jean-Claude Rouget	Al Shaqab Racing	1:34.48
2017	Thunder Snow	Christophe Soumillon	Saeed bin Suroor	Godolphin	1:38.78
2018	Intellogent	Pierre-Charles Boudot	Fabrice Chappet	Fiona Carmichael	1:35.83
2019	Too Darn Hot	Frankie Dettori	John Gosden	Andrew Lloyd Webber	1:21.29
2020	Pinatubo	William Buick	Charlie Appleby	Godolphin	1:23.03
2021	Laws of Indices	Olivier Peslier	Ken Condon	Miss C R Holmes	1:24.09
2022	Tenebrism	Ryan Moore	Aidan O'Brien	Westerberg/Coolmore/Merribelle Stables	1:22.91
2023	Good Guess	Stéphane Pasquier	Fabrice Chappet	Hisaaki Saito	1:23.36
2024	Puchkine	Ioritz Mendizabal	Jean-Claude Rouget	Alain Jathiere	1:21.49
2025	Woodshauna	Christophe Soumillon	Francis-Henri Graffard	Resolute Bloodstock	1:24.46
2026	Thesecretadversary	Christophe Soumillon	James Stack	Cayton Park Stud & Mrs John Magnier	1:22.17

== Earlier winners ==
- 1867: Nemea
- 1868: Mortemer
- 1870: Sornette
- 1872: Revigny
- 1874: Bieville
- 1875: My Emmy
- 1876: Le Drole
- 1877: Boiador
- 1878: Clocher
- 1879: Fido
- 1880: Beauminet
- 1881: Vizir
- 1883: Satory
- 1884: Little Duck
- 1885: Reluisant
- 1886: Alger
- 1887: Cherie
- 1888: St. Gall
- 1889: Tire-Larigot
- 1890: Yellow
- 1892: Diarbek
- 1893: Preux
- 1894: Polygone
- 1895: Launay
- 1896: Arreau
- 1897: Valparaiso
- 1898: Madrid
- 1899: Holocauste
- 1900: Codoman
- 1901: Grand Pont
- 1902: Bahr Yousouf
- 1903: Caius
- 1904: Fifre
- 1905: Genial
- 1906: Prestige
- 1907: Calomel
- 1908: Sea Sick
- 1909: Verdun
- 1911: Rubinat
- 1914: Durbar
- 1920: Odol
- 1921: Grazing
- 1922: Mazeppa
- 1923: São Paulo
- 1924: Le Gros Morne
- 1925: Coram
- 1926: Diplomate
- 1927: Flamant
- 1928: Kantar
- 1929: Arbaletrier
- 1930: Le Tourbillon
- 1931: Roi de Trefle
- 1932: Macaroni
- 1933: Le Cacique
- 1934: Duplex
- 1935: Le Gazon
- 1936: Vatellor
- 1937: Galloway
- 1938: Cannot
- 1939: Galerien
- 1940: Corviglia
- 1941: La Barca
- 1942: Puymirol
- 1943: Dogat
- 1944: Laborde
- 1945: Obelisque
- 1946: Souverain
- 1947: L'Imperial
- 1948: Jocker
- 1949: Marveil
- 1950: Janus
- 1951: Le Tyrol
- 1952: La Varende
- 1954: Peppermint
- 1955: Fauchelevent
- 1956: Incitatus
- 1957: Le Haar
- 1958: Launay
- 1959: Memorandum
- 1960: Angers
- 1961: Bobar
- 1962: Tang
- 1963: Spy Well
- 1964: Jour et Nuit
- 1965: Esso
- 1966: Silver Shark
- 1967: Locris
- 1968: Lorenzaccio
- 1969: Hill Run
- 1970: Master Guy
- 1971: Maroun
- 1972: Riverman
- 1973: Sharp Edge
- 1974: Antipode
- 1975: Speedy Dakota
- 1976: Earth Spirit

== See also ==
- List of French flat horse races
- Recurring sporting events established in 1858 – this race is included under its original title, Prix Biennal.
