= Most Improved =

Irish-bred Thoroughbred racehorse

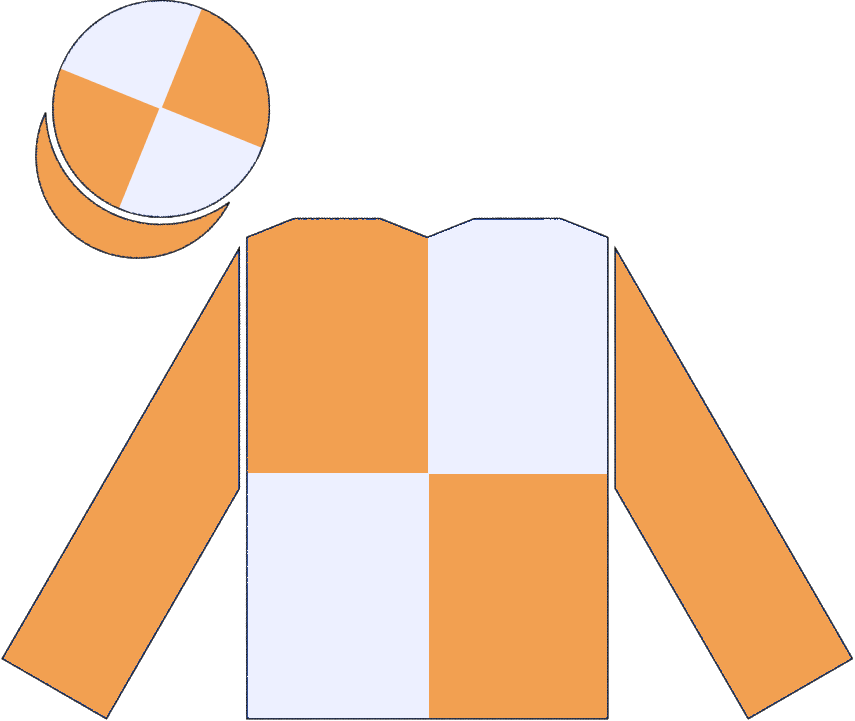
- Racing silks of Iraj Parvizi
- Sire: Lawman
- Grandsire: Invincible Spirit
- Dam: Tonnara
- Damsire: Linamix
- Sex: Stallion
- Foaled: 3 May 2009
- Country: Ireland
- Colour: Bay
- Breeder: Skymarc Farm Inc
- Owner: Iraj Parvizi; Derrick Smith; Sue Magnier; Michael Tabor
- Trainer: Brian J. Meehan; Aidan O'Brien
- Record: 9: 2-1-2
- Earnings: £211,285

Major wins
- St James's Palace Stakes (2012)

Most Improved (foaled 3 May 2009) is an Irish Thoroughbred racehorse who won the 2012 St James's Palace Stakes at Royal Ascot. He was owned by Iraj Parvizi and trained by Brian Meehan, before being purchased by Derrick Smith, Sue Magnier and Michael Tabor and transferred to Aidan O'Brien.

== Background ==
Most Improved is a bay horse bred by Skymarc Farm Inc and foaled on 3 May 2009. He was sired by Prix du Jockey Club winner Lawman. Most Improved's dam is Tonnara, a daughter of Poule d'Essai des Poulains winner Linamix.

== Racing career ==
=== 2011: Two-year-old season ===
In early August 2011 Most Improved made his first racecourse appearance and finished second in a Newmarket maiden, failing to win by a short head. Three weeks later he raced in another Newmarket maiden, this time winning by five lengths. He then started in one of the top two-year-old races, the Dewhurst Stakes. He finished third in the race, which ended in a bunch finish with only 1½ lengths separating first from fifth. Most Improved was ¾ length behind winner Parish Hall.

=== 2012: Three-year-old season ===
During the early spring of 2012 Most Improved was backed into second favourite for the 2000 Guineas. However he did not make it to the start of the Guineas, due to an injury sustained shortly before his intended prep run in the Craven Stakes. He made his first appearance as a three-year-old in the Prix du Jockey Club. In a race with a lot of interference he could not get a clear run and ended up finishing a distant fourteenth. He then went to Royal Ascot for the St James's Palace Stakes. He was ridden near the front of the field by jockey Kieren Fallon and took the lead with two furlongs left to run. He stayed at the front and went on to win by ¾ length from Hermival, in a field that also included Irish 2,000 Guineas winner Power and Breeders' Cup Juvenile Turf winner Wrote. On his next appearance, Most Improved ran poorly in the Prix Jacques Le Marois, being virtually pulled up in the closing stages by Fallon, as he finished last of the eleven runners behind Excelebration. In the Joel Stakes at Newmarket he finished in seventh place, over 7 lengths behind winner Penitent.

=== 2013: Four-year-old season ===
In his first race for Aidan O'Brien, Most Improved finished third of four runners in the International Stakes at The Curragh, about ten lengths behind winner Flying the Flag. In Most Improved's final race, he finished last of the ten runners in the Concorde Stakes, which was won by Sruthan.

== Stud career ==
Most Improved was retired to Coolmore Stud, where he now stands for a stud fee of €6,000.
