= Zee Zee Top =

British-bred racehorse (1999–2026)

- Sire: Zafonic
- Grandsire: Gone West
- Dam: Colorspin
- Damsire: High Top
- Sex: Mare
- Foaled: 21 April 1999
- Died: 12 November 2026 (aged 27)
- Country: United Kingdom
- Colour: Bay
- Breeder: Meon Valley Stud
- Owner: Helena Springfield Ltd
- Trainer: Michael Stoute
- Record: 7: 3-1-2
- Earnings: £157,717

Major wins
- Middleton Stakes (2003); Prix de l'Opéra (2003)

Zee Zee Top (21 April 1999 – 12 November 2026) was a British Thoroughbred racehorse and broodmare. She did not race until the autumn of her three-year-old season when she won a minor race on her debut and then finished second in the Severals Stakes. In the following year she showed top-class form to win the Middleton Stakes and Prix de l'Opéra as well as being placed in the Pretty Polly Stakes and Nassau Stakes. As a broodmare she produced Izzi Top and Jazzi Top (winner of the Prix de la Nonette).

== Background ==
Zee Zee Top was foaled on 21 April 1999, a dark bay mare with no white markings bred in England by the Hampshire-based Meon Valley Stud. She was sent into training with Michael Stoute at Newmarket, Suffolk.

She was sired by Zafonic, the best European two-year-old of 1992 who went on to win the 2000 Guineas in the following year. The best of Zafonic's other offspring included Xaar, and Zafeen. Her dam Colorspin won the Irish Oaks in 1986 and went on to become an outstanding broodmare whose other foals included Opera House and Kayf Tara.

== Racing career ==
=== 2002: three-year-old season ===
On 7 October 2002 at Pontefract Racecourse, Zee Zee Top made her track debut in a maiden race over one mile on firm ground and started the 4/6 favourite in a six-runner field. Ridden by Kieren Fallon she took the lead approaching the final furlong and quickly drew away from her opponents to win by seven lengths. Fallon was again in the saddle ten days later when the filly was stepped up in class for the Listed Severals Stakes on softer ground at Newmarket Racecourse and was matched against older fillies and mares. Starting at 12/1 she was restrained in the early stages before making steady progress to take second place, two lengths behind the four-year-old Salim Toto.

=== 2003: four-year-old season ===
Zee Zee Top began her second campaign in the Listed Middleton Stakes over ten furlongs at York Racecourse on 14 May and started the 11/10 favourite against five opponents including Chorist and Golden Silca (second in the Irish 1,000 Guineas and Coronation Stakes). After settling behind the leaders she was sent into the lead by Fallon at half way and kept on well to win by a length from Chorist, from whom she was receiving three pounds in weight.

Brett Doyle took the ride when Zee Zee Top was sent to Ireland and started favourite for the Group 2 Pretty Polly Stakes at the Curragh on 28 June. She was beaten a neck into second place by the three-year-old Hanami but was relegated one place for hampering the third-placed finisher Snippets as she switched left to obtain a clear run inside the last quarter mile. She was then stepped up to the highest class for the Group 1 Nassau Stakes at Goodwood Racecourse on 2 August in which she was ridden by Johnny Murtagh and came home third behind Russian Rhythm and the French filly Ana Marie. Later that month she was tried over one and a half miles in the Yorkshire Oaks but never looked likely to win and finished sixth of the eight runners behind Islington, beaten six and a half lengths by the winner.

Fallon and Zee Zee Top were reunited when the filly was sent to France and went off a 14/1 outsider for the Prix de l'Opéra over 2000 metres on holding ground at Longchamp Racecourse on 5 October. Bright Sky started favourite, while the other nine runners included Yesterday, Ana Marie, Next Gina (Preis der Diana), Trumbaka (Prix Corrida), Sweet Folly (Prix Cléopâtre) and Comercante (Prix de Psyché). Zee Zee Top raced towards the rear and turned into the straight in tenth place before launching a strong late run in the last 300 metres. She took the lead in the final strides and prevailed in a "blanket finish", beating Yesterday by a head, with Bright Sky and Trumbaka a neck and a head away in third and fourth.

== Death ==
Zee Zee Top died on 12 November 2026, at the age of 27.

== Breeding record ==
At the end of her racing career Zee Zee Top was retired to become a broodmare for the Meon Valley Sud. She produced at least eleven foals and four winners:

- Zee Zee Gee, a bay filly, foaled in 2005, sired by Galileo. Unraced.
- Green Top, bay filly, 2006, by Green Desert. Unraced.
- Rock N Roll Ransom, bay colt (later gelded), 2007, by Red Ransom. Won four races.
- Izzi Top, bay filly, 2008, by Pivotal. Won six races including Pretty Polly Stakes and Prix Jean Romanet.
- Monzza, bay filly, 2010, by Montjeu. Unraced.
- Jazzi Top, bay filly, 2012, by Danehill Dancer. Won three races including the Prix de la Nonette.
- Dance Rock, bay colt (later gelded), 2013, by Oasis Dream. Failed to win in nine races.
- Fizzi Top, bay filly, 2014, by Frankel. Unraced.
- Emaraaty, bay colt, 2015, by Dubawi. Won three races.
- Snazzi Top, bay filly, 2016, by Invincible Spirit.
- Flyin High, bay colt, 2018, by Siyouni.

== Pedigree ==
Pedigree of Zee Zee Top (GB), bay mare, 1999
Sire Zafonic (USA) 1990	Gone West (USA); 1984	Mr. Prospector	Raise a Native
Sire Zafonic (USA) 1990	Gone West (USA); 1984	Mr. Prospector	Gold Digger
Sire Zafonic (USA) 1990	Gone West (USA); 1984	Secrettame	Secretariat
Sire Zafonic (USA) 1990	Gone West (USA); 1984	Secrettame	Tamerett
Sire Zafonic (USA) 1990	Zaizafon (USA); 1982	The Minstrel (CAN)	Northern Dancer
Sire Zafonic (USA) 1990	Zaizafon (USA); 1982	The Minstrel (CAN)	Fleur
Sire Zafonic (USA) 1990	Zaizafon (USA); 1982	Mofida (GB)	Right Tack
Sire Zafonic (USA) 1990	Zaizafon (USA); 1982	Mofida (GB)	Wold Lass
Dam Colorspin (FR) 1983	High Top (IRE); 1969	Derring-Do (GB)	Darius
Dam Colorspin (FR) 1983	High Top (IRE); 1969	Derring-Do (GB)	Sipsey Bridge
Dam Colorspin (FR) 1983	High Top (IRE); 1969	Camenae (GB)	Vimy (FR)
Dam Colorspin (FR) 1983	High Top (IRE); 1969	Camenae (GB)	Madrilene
Dam Colorspin (FR) 1983	Reprocolor (GB); 1976	Jimmy Reppin	Midsummer Night (USA)
Dam Colorspin (FR) 1983	Reprocolor (GB); 1976	Jimmy Reppin	Sweet Molly (IRE)
Dam Colorspin (FR) 1983	Reprocolor (GB); 1976	Blue Queen	Majority Blue (IRE)
Dam Colorspin (FR) 1983	Reprocolor (GB); 1976	Blue Queen	Hill Queen (Family: 13-e)
