= Cezanne (horse) =

British-bred Thoroughbred racehorse

- Sire: Ajdal
- Grandsire: Northern Dancer
- Dam: Reprocolor
- Damsire: Jimmy Reppin
- Sex: Stallion
- Foaled: 26 April 1989
- Country: United Kingdom
- Colour: Bay
- Breeder: Meon Valley Stud
- Owner: Sheikh Mohammed; Saeed Manana; Godolphin; Mike Roberts
- Trainer: Michael Stoute; Hilal Ibrahim; Saeed bin Suroor; Michael Roberts
- Record: 38: 11-7-1
- Earnings: £287,226

Major wins
- Al Maktoum Challenge, Round 2 (1994); Al Maktoum Challenge, Round 3 (1994); Magnet Cup (1994); Spreti-Rennen (1994); Irish Champion Stakes (1994)

Cezanne (26 April 1989 – after 2001) was a British-bred Thoroughbred racehorse. Unraced as a two-year-old he showed modest form in 1992 and 1993, winning two minor races in England. After being transferred to race in Dubai he emerged as a top-class middle-distance performer as a five-year-old, taking the second and third rounds of the Al Maktoum Challenge before returning to Europe to win the Magnet Cup, Spreti-Rennen and Irish Champion Stakes. Following an unsuccessful campaign in 1996 he was retired to stud but proved to be infertile. After being gelded he competed in National Hunt races and won one minor race before being retired in 2001.

== Background ==
Cezzanne was a bay horse bred in England by the Hampshire-based Meon Valley Stud. As a yearling he was acquired by Sheikh Mohammed and was sent into training with Michael Stoute at Freemason Lodge in Newmarket, Suffolk.

Cezanne was one of only 35 foals sired by Ajdal, an outstanding sprinter who died at the age of four in 1988 after his first season at stud. His dam Reprocolor won the Lancashire Oaks and became one of Meon Valley's foundation mares: her other descendants have included Colorspin, Izzi Top, Kayf Tara and Opera House.

== Racing career ==
=== 1992: three-year-old season ===
On his racecourse debut, Cezanne finished fourth in a maiden race over ten furlongs at Windsor Racecourse on 11 May. Fifteen days later, in a similar event at Sandown Park he recorded his first success, winning by half a length from Scrutineer. In his two subsequent races that season he finished second in a minor race at Leicester in June and then ran unplaced in a handicap race at York in August.

=== 1993: four-year-old season ===
Cezanne began his second season finishing ninth in a handicap at Newbury in May and was then off the course until the autumn. In September he returned to finish sixth at Doncaster and then won a handicap at Pontefract Racecourse, beating the favourite Bold Stroke by one and a half lengths. Five days later he finished second in a similar event at Haydock Park.

At the end of the year he was sent to join Sheikh Mohammed's newly established Godolphin racing stable in Dubai where he was trained by Hilal Ibrahim. He made a successful start to his career in Dubai, winning a minor handicap at Nad Al Sheba Racecourse on 26 December.

=== 1994: five-year-old season ===
In January 1994 continued his good form in Dubai, winning races over 2400 metres and 1800 metres. On 13 February he contested the inaugural running of the second round of the Al Maktoum Challenge over 2000 metres at Nad Al Sheba. Ridden by Gary Hind he won by a short head from his stablemate Red Bishop. In the third round of the challenge over 2400 metres twelve days later, with Hind again in the saddle, he recorded another narrow victory with Red Bishop again taking second place.

On his returen to Europe Cezanne finished fourth in a handicap at Sandown on 1 July. Eight days later at York he was assigned top weight of 138 pounds and started at odds of 9/2 for the John Smith's Magnet Cup. After being restrained by Hind in the early stages he took the lead in the final furlong and won "readily" by a neck from the three-year-old Midnight Legend (winner of the King George V Stakes). In August the horse finished second to Urgent Request when favourite for the Rose of Lancaster Stakes and was then sent to Germany to contest the Group 3 Spreti-Rennen over 2000 metres at Baden-Baden. After turning into the straight in sith place he took the lead in the closing stages and won by two lengths from Vincenzo.

Mick Kinane took over from Hind when Cezanne was stepped up in class for the Group 1 Irish Champion Stakes over ten furlongs at Leopardstown Racecourse on 10 September. He was made the 7/2 third choice in the betting behind the joint-favourites Muhtarram and Del Deya (Pretty Polly Stakes) whilst the other five runners were Grand Lodge, Environment Friend, Scribe (Gordon Richards Stakes), Garden of Heaven (Prix du Conseil de Paris) and Perfect Imposter (Tattersalls Gold Cup). Cezanne raced close behind the leaders and moved into second place behind Del Deya half a mile from the finish. He took the lead inside the final furlong and prevailed in a "blanket finish", winning by a neck, a short head and a neck from Del Deya, Grand Lodge and Muhtarram.

For his final run of the season Cezanne was sent to the United States for the Breeders' Cup Classic on the dirt track at Churchill Downs on 5 November and finished ninth of the fourteen runners behind Concern.

=== 1996: seven-year-old season ===
After missing the whole of the 1995 season Ceanne returned as a seven-year-old in 1996 when he was trained by Saeed bin Suroor. Racing in Dubai he contested the Al Maktoum Challenge, finishing fourth to Tamayaz in the first round on 11 February and second to the same horse in the third round on 10 March. In the Dubai Duty Free (then run on dirt) seventeen days later he proved no match for the American challenger Key of Luck but came home second of the fourteen runners. On returning to Europe he ran consistently without ever looking likely to recover his 1994 form. He finished sixth in the Premio Presidente della Repubblica at Milan in May, fifth in the Prince of Wales's Stakes at Royal Ascot in June and fourth in the September Stakes at Kempton in September.

=== 1998 –2001: National Hunt career ===
Cezanne was retired from racing and the end of the 1996 season and became a breeding stallion in Ireland. Standing at the Coolagown Stud in County Cork he proved to be infertile and produced no recorded foals. He was gelded in September 1998.

In the late autumn of 1998 Cezanne joined the stable of Michael Roberts in Sussex and embarked on a new career as a National Hunt horse. After being beaten in his first two starts over obstacles he won a Novice hurdle race at Huntingdon Racecourse on 12 May 1999. He continued to compete in hurdle races for the next three seasons but never won again and ended his career by finishing unplaced in a handicap hurdle at Wincanton in November 2001.

== Pedigree ==
Pedigree of Cezanne (GB), bay gelding, 1989
Sire Ajdal (USA) 1984	Northern Dancer (CAN); 1961	Nearctic	Nearco
Sire Ajdal (USA) 1984	Northern Dancer (CAN); 1961	Nearctic	Lady Angela
Sire Ajdal (USA) 1984	Northern Dancer (CAN); 1961	Natalma	Native Dancer
Sire Ajdal (USA) 1984	Northern Dancer (CAN); 1961	Natalma	Almahmoud
Sire Ajdal (USA) 1984	Native Partner (USA); 1966	Raise A Native	Native Dancer
Sire Ajdal (USA) 1984	Native Partner (USA); 1966	Raise A Native	Raise You
Sire Ajdal (USA) 1984	Native Partner (USA); 1966	Dinner Partner	Tom Fool
Sire Ajdal (USA) 1984	Native Partner (USA); 1966	Dinner Partner	Bluehaze
Dam Reprocolor (GB) 1976	Jimmy Reppin (GB); 1965	Midsummer Night	Djeddah
Dam Reprocolor (GB) 1976	Jimmy Reppin (GB); 1965	Midsummer Night	Night Sound
Dam Reprocolor (GB) 1976	Jimmy Reppin (GB); 1965	Sweet Molly	Chamier
Dam Reprocolor (GB) 1976	Jimmy Reppin (GB); 1965	Sweet Molly	Cockles and Mussels
Dam Reprocolor (GB) 1976	Blue Queen (GB); 1967	Majority Blue	Major Portion
Dam Reprocolor (GB) 1976	Blue Queen (GB); 1967	Majority Blue	Gorm Abu
Dam Reprocolor (GB) 1976	Blue Queen (GB); 1967	Hill Queen	Bjebe
Dam Reprocolor (GB) 1976	Blue Queen (GB); 1967	Hill Queen	Home Rule (Family: 13-e)

- Through his sire Ajdal, Cezanne was inbred 4 × 4 to Native Dancer, mening that this stallion appears twice i the fourth generation of his pedigree.
