= Lamprell =

Oil rig construction company

Lamprell plc
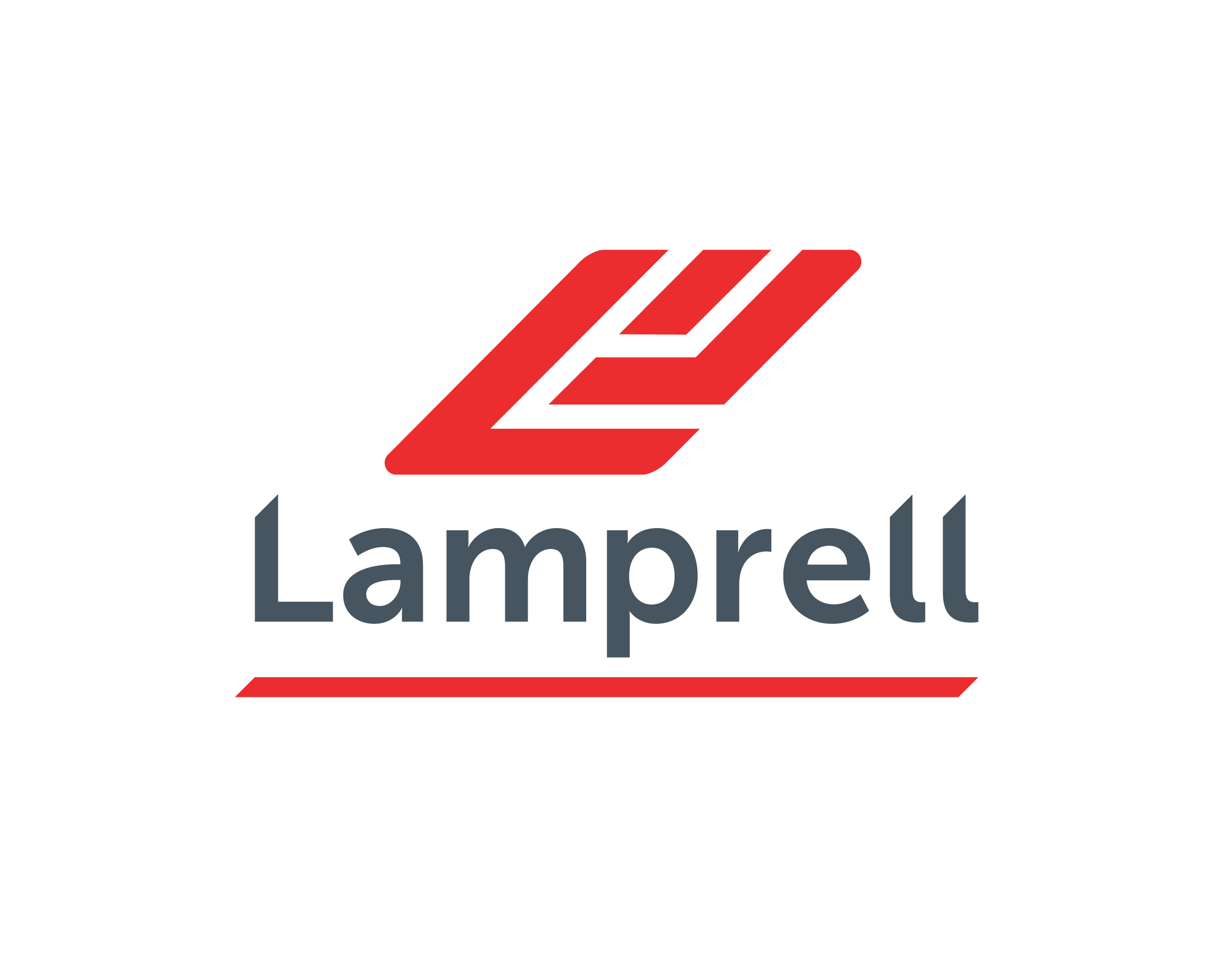
- Type: Private
- Industry: Energy
- Founded: 1976
- Headquarters: Hamriyah, United Arab Emirates
- Key people: Ian Prescott, CEO; Neil Millar, COO
- Products: Oil & Gas; Renewables
- Revenue: ▲US$338.6 million (2020)
- Operating income: ▲US$(32.0) million (2020)
- Net income: ▲US$(53.4) million (2020)
- Number of employees: 5,000 (2021)
- Website: www.lamprell.com

Lamprell plc, based in the United Arab Emirates, specialises in construction and fabrication, servicing both the Renewables and Oil & Gas industries. It builds wind turbine foundations as well as shallow-water drilling jackup rigs, liftboats and land rigs, and it also carries out rig refurbishment. In 2021 the company added a Digital business unit. It was listed on the London Stock Exchange until it was taken private in 2022.

== History ==
The company was established by Steven Lamprell in 1976 in Dubai. The company established three sites in the United Arab Emirates and one in Thailand before starting jackup rig conversions in the late 1980s. In the late 1990s, the company started to diversify into oil rig construction. In 2006 the company launched an initial public offering on the Alternative Investment Market and in 2008 it secured a full listing on the London Stock Exchange.

Lamprell diversified its offering further, from predominantly servicing the oil & gas market to entering the renewables' arena in the early 2000s. It delivered four self-propelled jackup vessels for offshore oil & gas and offshore wind turbine installation to Seajacks, and two wind turbine installation vessels to Fred Olsen.

The company acquired Maritime Industrial Services, another maritime services business, for $336 million in July 2011 but was hit by a series of profit warnings in 2012 following a string of losses, delays and deferrals in individual projects. In March 2013, the company was fined £2.4 million by the Financial Services Authority in connection with the profit warnings and for its failure to keep the market properly informed.

The company entered the Guinness World Records book in 2014 for the "heaviest load moved by self-propelled modular trailers" for moving a 13,191.98 metric tonne Production, Utilities and Quarters (PUQ) deck for its client Nexen Petroleum UK.

In 2016, Lamprell won its first contract to construct 60 wind turbine foundation structures following an award from ScottishPower Renewables for the East Anglia One project.

In 2017, Lamprell, via subsidiary Maritime Offshore Limited, joined a partnership developing the King Salman Global Maritime Industries Complex in Saudi Arabia.

In 2022, the company announced that Thunderball Investments, a company owned by Blofeld Investment Management and AlGihaz, had made an offer for the company worth £38.8m ($46.5m) which the board of Lamprell had accepted. Lamprell was taken private through the deal later that year.

In May 2023 Ian Prescott, formerly a senior vice president of McDermott International, succeeded Christopher McDonald as chief executive. In September 2024 RWE awarded Lamprell two contracts to supply 184 transition pieces for its Norfolk Vanguard West and Norfolk Vanguard East offshore wind farms off the east coast of the United Kingdom.

== Operations ==
Lamprell has three main business units: renewables, oil & gas, and digital. Its main operations centres and yards are in the UAE and Saudi Arabia. In the UAE its main facility is located in Hamriyah, and it has a second facility in Jebel Ali and a third in Dubai Investments park.

Lamprell also has a joint partnership with Saudi Aramco, Bahri and HHI in the Industrial Maritime Yard in Saudi Arabia.
