= Colorspin =

French-bred Thoroughbred racehorse

- Sire: High Top
- Grandsire: Derring-Do
- Dam: Reprocolor
- Damsire: Jimmy Reppin
- Sex: Mare
- Foaled: 16 March 1983
- Country: France
- Colour: Bay
- Breeder: Meon Valley Stud
- Owner: Helena Springfield Ltd
- Trainer: Michael Stoute
- Record: 10: 3-1-2

Major wins
- Irish Oaks (1986)

Awards
- British Broodmare of the Year (2003); Timeform rating: 117 p (1985), 118 (1986)

Colorspin (16 March 1983 – 14 August 2012) was a French-bred, British-trained Thoroughbred racehorse and broodmare. She showed great promise as a two-year-old in 1985 when she won both of her races in convincing fashion. In the following year she finished third in the Musidora Stakes and fourth in The Oaks before recording her biggest success with an easy win in the Irish Oaks. She was beaten in her two remaining starts and was retired racing at the end of the year.

She became an outstanding broodmare, producing the King George VI and Queen Elizabeth Stakes winner Opera House, the dual Ascot Gold Cup winner Kayf Tara and the Prix de l'Opéra winner Zee Zee Top.

== Background ==
Colorspin was a "tall, lengthy" bay mare bred in France by Egon Weinfeld's Hampshire-based Meon Valley Stud. Like the other horses raced by the Meon Valley Stud, Colorspin competed in the black and white colours of Helena Springfield Ltd a company owned by Weinfeld. She was trained by Michael Stoute at his Beech Hurst stables in Newmarket, Suffolk, where she was one of an outstanding group of fillies which also included Sonic Lady and Untold.

She was sired by High Top, who won the 2000 Guineas in 1972 and later became a successful breeding stallion whose other progeny included Top Ville, Circus Plume and Cut Above. Her dam Reprocolor won the Lancashire Oaks in 1979 and went on to become one of Meon Valley's three foundation mares alongside One in a Million and Odeon. Apart from Colorspin she produced Cezanne and the Prix de l'Opéra winner Bella Colora and she was also the female-line ancestor of Lyric of Light.

== Racing career ==
=== 1985: two-year-old season ===
On her racecourse debut Colorspin contested a nineteen-runner maiden race over six furlongs at Nottingham Racecourse and won by a length from the Henry Cecil-trained Thousand Sails. In October she was moved up in distance for the Listed Rochford Thompson Newbury Stakes over seven and a half furlongs at Newbury Racecourse. She raced in second place before going to the front three furlongs out and won by a length from Salchow with a gap of five lengths back to Chernicherva in third place.

=== 1986: three-year-old season ===
Colorspin began her second season in the Musidora Stakes (a trial for The Oaks) over ten furlongs at York Racecourse in May and finished third behind Rejuvenate and Ala Mahlik. In the Oaks at Epsom Racecourse on 7 June she was the least fancied of her trainer's three runners and started a 25/1 outsider in a fifteen-runner field. Ridden by Brian Rouse she exceeded expectations as she came home fourth behind Midway Lady, Untold and Maysoon. Pat Eddery took the ride when the filly was sent to Ireland to contest the Irish Oaks on softer ground at the Curragh on 12 July. Untold (the choice of Stoute's stable jockey Walter Swinburn) was made the odds-on favourite ahead of the Pretty Polly Stakes winner Fleur Royale with Colorspin the 6/1 third choice in a field of eight fillies. Ridden with great confidence by Eddery, Colorspin tracked the front-running Fleur Royale before taking the lead a furlong out and won "very easily" by three lengths with a gap of twelve lengths back to Untold in third place.

On 19 August Colorspin, ridden by Swinburn, started 9/4 favourite in a strong renewal of the Yorkshire Oaks which included Gull Nook (Ribblesdale Stakes), Park Express, Untold, Fleur Royale and Ivor's Image (Oaks d'Italia). Racing on much firmer ground she finished fourth of the eleven runners behind Untold, Park Express and Ivor's Image. On her final appearance Colorspin was matched against male opposition and older horses in the Irish Champion Stakes at Phoenix Park Racecourse on 7 September. She never looked likely to win and was outpaced in the straight, coming home eleventh of the thirteen runners, some sixteen lengths behind the winner Park Express.

== Assessment ==
In 1985, the independent Timeform organisation gave Colorspin a rating of 117 p (the "p" indicating that she was expected to make more than usual improvement), making her seven pounds inferior to their best two-year-old filly Femme Elite. In the official International Classification she was rated twelve pounds behind the top-rated Bakharoff and nine pounds behind the leading filly Baiser Vole. In the following year Colorspin was rated 118 by Timeform, eleven pound behind their best three-year-old fillies Sonic Lady and Darara. She was rated nine pounds behind the top-rated Sonic Lady in the International Classififcation and was the sixth-best three-year-old filly in the 11 furlong plus division.

== Breeding record ==
Colorspin was retired from racing to become a broodmare at the Meon Valley Stud. She produced at least sixteen foals between 1988 and 2008:

- Opera House, a bay colt, foaled in 1988, sired by Sadler's Wells. Won eight races including Tattersalls Rogers Gold Cup, Coronation Cup, Eclipse Stakes, King George VI and Queen Elizabeth Stakes.
- Highland Dress, bay colt, 1989, by Lomond. Won four races.
- Polanski, bay colt, 1991, by Polish Precedent. Failed to win in two races.
- Stencil, chestnut colt (later gelded), 1992, by Nashwan
- Color Precedent, bay filly, 1993, by Polish Precedent
- Kayf Tara, bay colt, 1994, by Sadler's Wells. Won ten races including Ascot Gold Cup, Irish St Leger, Goodwood Cup.
- Spinning the Yarn, bay filly, 1996, by Barathea. Unplaced on only start. Dam of Necklace (Moyglare Stud Stakes).
- Mafnood, bay colt, 1997, by Rainbow Quest. Unraced.
- Turn of a Century, bay filly, 1998, by Halling. Won one race.
- Zee Zee Top, bay filly, 1999, by Zafonic. Won three races including Middleton Stakes and Prix de l'Opéra. Dam of Izzi Top (Pretty Polly Stakes, Prix Jean Romanet) and Jazzi Top (Prix de la Nonette).
- Feel Good Factor, bay colt (gelded), 2000, by Singspiel. Won two races under National Hunt rules.
- Team Player, bay colt, 2001, by Mark of Esteem.Failed to win in two races.
- Galaxy Highflyer, bay filly, 2004, by Galileo. Unraced. Dam of Oklahoma City (Tattersalls Millions 2-y-o Trophy)
- Chioroscuro, grey colt (gelded), 2005, by Act One. Failed to win in three races.
- Colorado Dawn, chestnut filly, 2006, by Fantastic Light. Unraced.
- Justification, dark bay or brown colt (gelded), 2008, by Montjeu. on one flat race and two races over hurdles.

In 2003 Colorspin was named British Broodmare of the Year by the Thoroughbred Breeders' Association.

Colorspin was retired from breeding in 2008 and died at the Meon Valley Stud from a suspected heart attack on 14 August 2012 at the age of 29.

== Pedigree ==
Pedigree of Colorspin (GB), bay mare, 1983
Sire High Top (IRE) 1969	Derring-Do (GB); 1961	Darius	Dante
Sire High Top (IRE) 1969	Derring-Do (GB); 1961	Darius	Yasna
Sire High Top (IRE) 1969	Derring-Do (GB); 1961	Sipsey Bridge	Abernant
Sire High Top (IRE) 1969	Derring-Do (GB); 1961	Sipsey Bridge	Claudette
Sire High Top (IRE) 1969	Camenae (GB); 1961	Vimy	Wild Risk
Sire High Top (IRE) 1969	Camenae (GB); 1961	Vimy	Mimi
Sire High Top (IRE) 1969	Camenae (GB); 1961	Madrilene	Court Martial
Sire High Top (IRE) 1969	Camenae (GB); 1961	Madrilene	Marmite
Dam Reprocolor (GB) 1976	Jimmy Reppin (GB); 1965	Midsummer Night	Djeddah
Dam Reprocolor (GB) 1976	Jimmy Reppin (GB); 1965	Midsummer Night	Night Sound
Dam Reprocolor (GB) 1976	Jimmy Reppin (GB); 1965	Sweet Molly	Chamier
Dam Reprocolor (GB) 1976	Jimmy Reppin (GB); 1965	Sweet Molly	Cockles and Mussels
Dam Reprocolor (GB) 1976	Blue Queen (GB); 1967	Majority Blue	Major Portion
Dam Reprocolor (GB) 1976	Blue Queen (GB); 1967	Majority Blue	Gorm Abu
Dam Reprocolor (GB) 1976	Blue Queen (GB); 1967	Hill Queen	Bjebe
Dam Reprocolor (GB) 1976	Blue Queen (GB); 1967	Hill Queen	Home Rule (Family: 13-e)
