= King Salman Global Maritime Industries Complex =

Shipyard in Ras Al-Khair, Saudi Arabia

The King Salman Global Maritime Industries Complex is a shipyard in Ras Al-Khair, Saudi Arabia that is under construction and planned to open in late 2018. Upon completion, it will be the largest shipyard in the world. Development of the facility began in November 2015, when Saudi Arabian oil and gas company Saudi Aramco and South Korean shipbuilder Hyundai Heavy Industries (HHI) signed a memorandum of understanding (MoU) regarding development of marine industry in Saudi Arabia, including a large shipyard. In January 2016, it was announced that the partnership to construct the shipyard had expanded with the signing of an MoU between the National Shipping Company of Saudi Arabia, Maritime Offshore Limited (a Lamprell subsidiary), Saudi Aramco, and HHI. The consortium subsequently signed a joint development agreement in June to undertake feasibility analysis of the shipyard, which had by then been confirmed to be sited in Ras Al-Khair.

Royal HaskoningDHV and Hyundai Engineering & Construction were awarded a design contract for the facility in October 2016, and the ceremonial groundbreaking took place on 29 November 2016, although the first major construction contract, for dredging on site preparation, was not signed until May 2017. In November 2017, Saudi Aramco awarded China Power Construction Group a $3 billion contract to build the shipyard facilities. Total construction costs are estimated to be about US$4.3 billion. The complex is scheduled to open in stages from late 2018 through 2022, when it will reach full capacity. When complete, the facility is estimated to increase the gross domestic product of Saudi Arabia by $17 billion, while decreasing the country's imports by $12 billion and supporting 80,000 jobs nationally.

The facility will be about 4.96 square kilometres (1,230 acres) in area, with several dry docks and at least 15 separate piers. It will have four major areas of operation—shipbuilding, ship repair, oil rig construction, and oil rig support. In July 2017, Hyundai Heavy Industries signed a memorandum of understanding to jointly develop with Saudi Aramco and investment company Dussur a $400 million factory to build medium speed marine diesel engines at the complex. In January 2018, the anchor facility at the complex, a shipyard named International Maritime Industries, was incorporated with orders for at least 20 oil rigs and 50 ships.

== See also ==
- List of things named after Saudi kings
