= Grand Glory =

British racehorse

- Sire: Olympic Glory
- Grandsire: Choisir
- Dam: Madonna Lily
- Damsire: Daylami
- Sex: Mare
- Foaled: 19 April 2016
- Country: United Kingdom
- Color: Bay
- Breeder: Haras De Bourgeauville
- Owner: Bartolo Faraci; Albert Frassetto, John D'Amato & Mike Pietrangelo; Haras de Hus
- Trainer: Gianluca Bietolini
- Record: 21: 8-4-4
- Earnings: £878,660

Major wins
- Prix Zarkava (2020, 2022); Prix de Flore (2020); Grand Prix de Vichy (2021); Prix Jean Romanet (2021); Prix Allez France (2022)

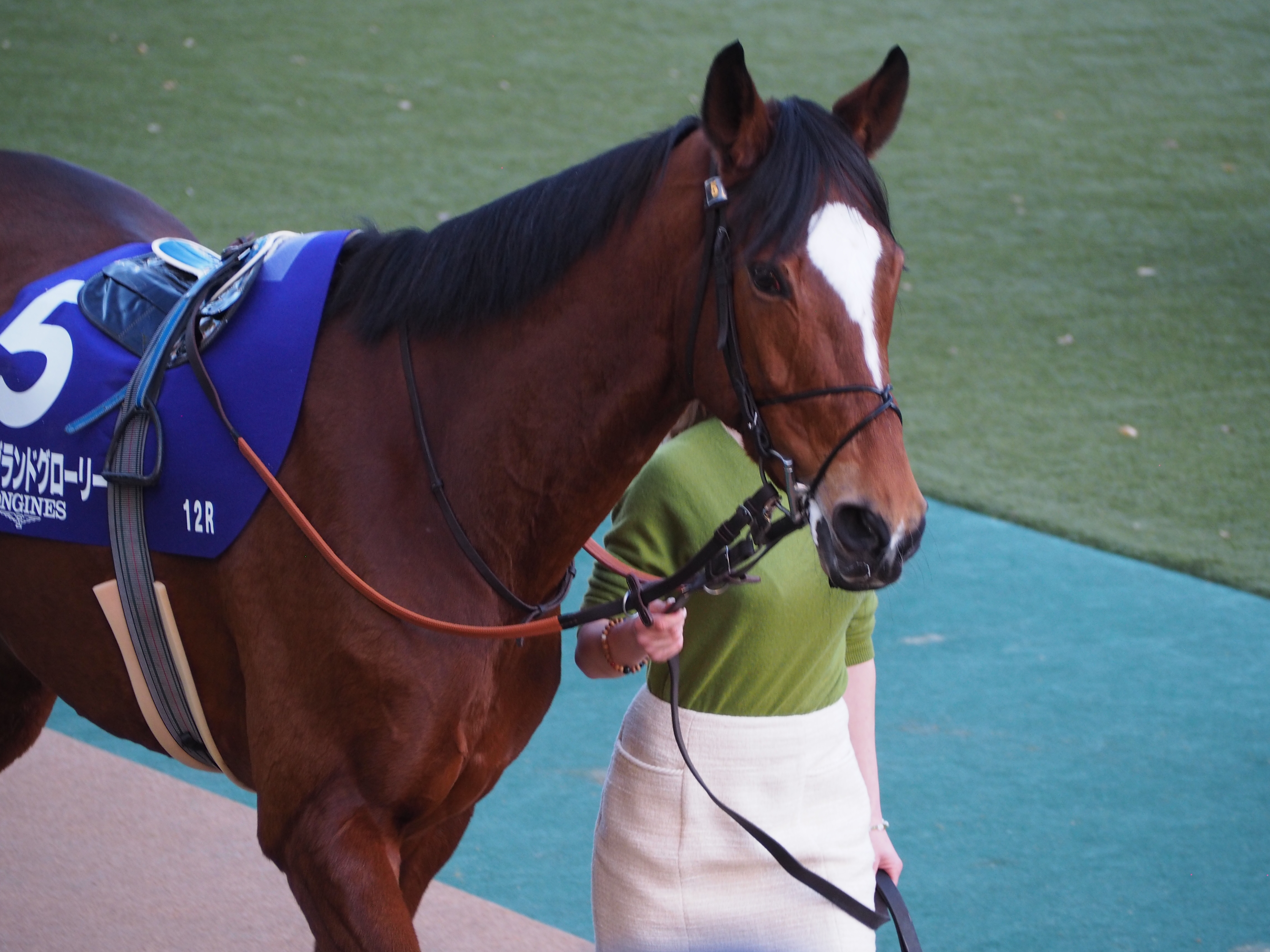
A picture of Grand Glory in 2022

Grand Glory (foaled 19 April 2016) is a British-bred, French-trained Thoroughbred racehorse. In her early career she was lightly-campaigned but showed good racing ability, winning her only race as a juvenile and finishing third in the Prix de Diane in 2019. As a four-year-old in 2020 she won the Listed Prix Zarkava and the Group 3 Prix de Flore. Grand Glory was even better as a five-year-old in 2021 when she took the Grand Prix de Vichy and the Prix Jean Romanet as well as running second in the Prix de l'Opera and fifth in the Japan Cup. In 2022 she won a second Prix Zarkava before taking the Prix Allez France and finishing third in the Prince of Wales's Stakes.

== Background ==
Grand Glory is a bay mare with a white blaze and white socks on her hind legs bred by the Normandy-based Haras De Bourgeauville. In October the yearling was consigned to the Arqana sale and was bought for €18,000 by Marco Bozzi Bloodstock. She entered the ownership of Bartolo Faraci and was sent into training with Gianluca Bietolini at Maisons Laffitte.

She was from the first crop of foals sired by Olympic Glory, whose wins included the Prix Jean-Luc Lagardère, Queen Elizabeth II Stakes, Lockinge Stakes and Prix de la Forêt. Grand Glory's dam Madonna Lily showed no racing ability, failing to win in five starts. Her grand-dam Light of Hope was a full sister to Alzao and a close relative of Tom Rolfe.

== Racing career ==
=== 2018: two-year-old season ===
Grand Glory began her track career in a 1900 metre maiden race on the polytrack surface at Deauville Racecourse on 14 December when she was ridden by Stephane Pasquier. Starting a 25/1 outsider she made a successful debut as she won by three quarter lengths from Lady Hippolyta.

=== 2019: three-year-old season ===
Before the start of the 2019 season Grand Glory was transferred to the ownership of Albert Frassetto, John D'Amato & Mike Pietrangelo. On her first appearance of the year the filly was stepped up to Listed Prix Rose de Mai over 2000 metres at Saint-Cloud Racecourse on March and finished second of the nine runners behind Phoceene, beaten one and a half lengths by the winner. Over the same course and distance in April she started 2.5/1 second favourite for the Prix la Troienne and won by a length and a quarter from the Andre Fabre-trained Tilda. In the Group 1 Prix de Diane over 2100 metres at Chantilly Racecourse a month later, Grand Glory started a 28/1 outsider but exceeded expectations as she produced a strong late run to take third place behind Channel and Commes, beaten half a length and a head.

=== 2020: four-year-old season ===
After an absence of almost eleven months, Grand Glory returned to the track in the Listed Prix Zarkava over 2100 metres at Longchamp Racecourse on 14 May. Ridden by Pierre-Charles Boudot she went off the 3.3/1 second favourite and won by one and three quarter lengths from Romanciere.

In the following month Grand Glory started odd-on favourite for the Group 3 Prix Corrida but was beaten a neck into second place by Ambition. She was the beaten favourite again in her next race, finishing third to Ebaiyra and Spirit of Appin in the Prix de Pomone over 2500 metres at Deauville in August. The filly was then stepped up to Group 1 class for her next two races but made little impact, finishing ninth to Tarnawa in the Prix Vermeille at Longchamp in September and seventh behind the same horse in the Prix de l'Opera at the same track on 4 October. Three weeks later, with Boudot in the saddle, Grand Glory was dropped in class for the Group 3 Prix de Flore over 2100 metres on heavy ground at Saint-Cloud and started the 5.9/1 fourth choice in a seven-runner field. She started slowly and raced towards the rear of the field but then made steady progress on the inside to take the lead 300 metres from the finish. She stayed on well under pressure in the closing stages and won by a neck from the three-year-old Solsticia.

For her final run of the year Grand Glory was sent to Italy to contest the Group 2 Premio Lydia Tesio over 2000 metres at Capannelle Racecourse on 8 November. She stayed on well after racing at the rear of the field for most of the way but never looked likely to win and came home sixth behind the British-trained Angel Power, beaten two and three quarter lengths by the winner.

=== 2021: five-year-old season ===
On her first run as a five-year-old Grand Glory was matched against male opposition in the Prix Exbury over 2000 metres at Saint-Cloud on 21 March and finished second to the six-year-old gelding Skalleti. On 2 May she ran poorly in the Prix Allez France over the same distance at Longchamp coming home last of the six runners. She produced a better effort in La Coupe over the same course and distance on 13 June as she finished a close third behind the geldings Iresine and Magny Cours. At Vichy Racecourse on 21 July, with Cristan Demuro in the saddle, Grand Glory went off at odds of 8.5/1 for the Group 3 Grand Prix de Vichy, a race which saw Iresine start the 0.2/1 favourite. After being restrained at the rear of the field in the early stages, the mare moved up to take the lead from the front-running Diamond Vendome 200 metres from the finish, opened up a clear advantage, and won by two lengths despite being eased down in the final strides.

Grand Glory returned to all-female competition for the Group 1 Prix Jean Romanet over 2000 metres at Deauville on 22 August when she was ridden by Demuro and went off the 23.2/1 seventh choice in an eight-runner field. Lady Bowthorpe started favourite while the other contenders included Audarya, Ebaiyra, Ambition and Thundering Nights. She raced towards the rear as usual as Ebaiyra set the pace before making progress in the last 400 metres. Audarya gained the advantage approaching the last 200 metres but Grand Glory maintained her run, caught up with the leader on the line and won by a short head. After the race Gianluca Bietolini said "I really wanted a good pace to run at and she got a lovely clean split and then she had to accelerate twice...She was really extraordinary there because she had to really pick up just to get to the leader and then there was a moment when I wondered if she could go past. But she was so courageous and Cristian gave her a brilliant ride. It's a dream to win a race like this and especially with this mare. She really deserved it and I'm still pinching myself, I can't believe it."

On 3 October Grand Glory started the 6.2/1 third favourite in her second attempt to win the Prix de l'Opera. Ridden by Frankie Dettori she raced in mid-division before unleashing a strong late run but after taking the lead 100 metres from the finish she was caught on the line and beaten a nose into second place by the three-year-old Rougir. Bietolini commented "I'm disappointed for the mare who is so brave and who has run a spectacular race. Dettori rode her magnificently. We won a Prix Jean Romanet by a nose and have lost here by the same. That's racing." For what was intended to be her final race, Grand Glory was sent to Japan to contest the Japan Cup over 2400 metres at Tokyo Racecourse on 28 November. Ridden by Demuro, and starting a 56/1 outsider, she never looked likely to win but stayed on well in the straight to come home fifth of the eighteen runners behind Contrail, beaten five lengths by the winner.

In December 2021 Grand Glory was consigned to the Arqana Breeding Stock Sale and was bought for €2,500,000 by YOHEA (Anne-Sophie Yoh) on behalf of an unnamed client.

=== 2021: six-year-old season ===
Despite expectations that she would be retired from racing, Grand Glory returned to the track in 2022 in the ownership of the Haras de Hus. She began her campaign by attempting to repeat her 2020 success in the Prix Zarkava on 10 April at Longchamp and started at odds of 2/1 in an eight-runner field. Ridden by Denuro she was restrained towards the rear in the early stages before producing her customary strong finish and won by one and three quarter lengths and half a length from Burgarita and Ebaiyra after taking the lead 150 metres from the finish. Bietolini commented "Obviously I'm very happy for her new owners... But mostly I'm really pleased for the mare. She accelerated just as well as ever, and Cristian knows her by heart." In the Prix Allez France over 2000 metres at Longchamp on 1 May she started the odds-on favourite in a seven-runner field and won by three and a half lengths from Burgarita after taking the lead 300 metres from the finish. After the race Bietolini said "That was just perfect... She did everything right and she didn't have a hard race... she extended herself beautifully... she is heavier than she was at the same time last year and she is still maturing and getting stronger."

For her next race Grand Glory was sent to England to contest the Group 1 Prince of Wales's Stakes over ten furlongs at Royal Ascot on 15 June when she was partnered by Mickael Barzalona and started the 16/1 outsider in a five-runner field. After racing towards the rear of the field she appeared to be outpaced in the straight but stayed on well in the closing stages to finish third behind State Of Rest and Bay Bridge.

== Pedigree ==
Pedigree of Grand Glory (GB), bay mare, 2016
Sire Olympic Glory (IRE) 2010	Choisir (AUS); 1999	Danehill Dancer (IRE)	Danehill (USA)
Sire Olympic Glory (IRE) 2010	Choisir (AUS); 1999	Danehill Dancer (IRE)	Mira Adonde (USA)
Sire Olympic Glory (IRE) 2010	Choisir (AUS); 1999	Great Selection	Lunchtime (GB)
Sire Olympic Glory (IRE) 2010	Choisir (AUS); 1999	Great Selection	Pensive Mood
Sire Olympic Glory (IRE) 2010	Acidanthera (GB); 1995	Alzao (USA)	Lyphard
Sire Olympic Glory (IRE) 2010	Acidanthera (GB); 1995	Alzao (USA)	Lady Rebecca (GB)
Sire Olympic Glory (IRE) 2010	Acidanthera (GB); 1995	Amaranthus	Shirley Heights
Sire Olympic Glory (IRE) 2010	Acidanthera (GB); 1995	Amaranthus	Amaranda (USA)
Dam Madonna Lily (IRE) 2005	Daylami (IRE); 1994	Doyoun	Mill Reef (USA)
Dam Madonna Lily (IRE) 2005	Daylami (IRE); 1994	Doyoun	Dumka (FR)
Dam Madonna Lily (IRE) 2005	Daylami (IRE); 1994	Daltawa	Miswaki (USA)
Dam Madonna Lily (IRE) 2005	Daylami (IRE); 1994	Daltawa	Damana (FR)
Dam Madonna Lily (IRE) 2005	Maria De La Luz (GB); 1996	Machiavellian (USA)	Mr Prospector
Dam Madonna Lily (IRE) 2005	Maria De La Luz (GB); 1996	Machiavellian (USA)	Coup de Folie
Dam Madonna Lily (IRE) 2005	Maria De La Luz (GB); 1996	Light of Hope (USA)	Lyphard
Dam Madonna Lily (IRE) 2005	Maria De La Luz (GB); 1996	Light of Hope (USA)	Lady Rebecca (GB) (Family: 9-h)

- Grand Glory's great-grandparents Alzao and Light of Hope were full siblings, meaning that she was inbred 4 × 4 to both Lyphard and Lady Rebecca
