= Maritime Industrial Services =

Saudi Arabian engineering and contracting group

Maritime Industrial Services Co. Ltd. Inc.
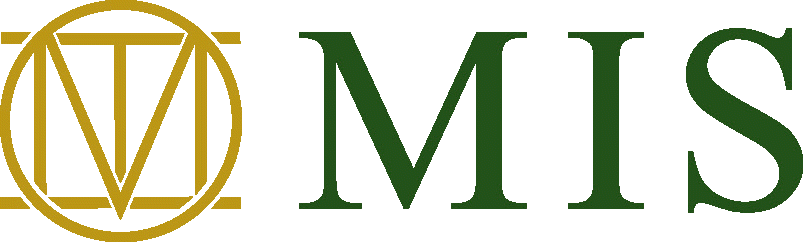
- Type: Public limited company
- Traded as: OSE: MIS
- Founded: 1979
- Headquarters: Dubai, United Arab Emirates
- Area served: Worldwide
- Key people: Mazen Shaat (CEO); Kamal Zaki ALLaithi(CFO)
- Revenue: FY 2010 US $385.4 million
- Net income: FY 2010 US $35.7 million
- Number of employees: +4,500
- Website: Official website

Maritime Industrial Services Co. Ltd. Inc. is a Saudi Arabian engineering and contracting group providing a broad range of products and services to the energy sector. It is a subsidiary of Lamprell PLC.

MIS' business scope covers EPC, Fabrication, New Build, Rig Refurb, Tech Services (Operations & Maintenance) and Safety Services.

MIS' operational scope of work covers engineering, procurement, fabrication, construction, safety, operating and maintenance services to the oil, gas, petrochemical, energy, power generation and marine industries.

== History ==
The company was founded in 1979. In 1985, the company moved its operations from Dubai to a yard in Sharjah, where it began manufacturing pressure vessels. That year also saw the acquisition of the Sunbelt Safety division.

By 1990, MIS had expanded into Engineering, Procurement, and Construction (EPC) services. In 2001, the company entered into a joint venture to establish MIS Arabia. The company continued to grow, securing its first New Build contract in 2006.

In 2007, MIS was listed on the Oslo Børs stock exchange, and in 2008, it acquired Rig Metals, which focused on onshore rig components. This expansion led to the delivery of its first rig in the Middle East in 2009 and the launch of EPI.

Further developments in 2010 included the start of Production Services, the acquisition of Litwin PEL, and a Memorandum of Understanding with Kavin Engineering. In 2012, MIS was acquired by Lamprell PLC, marking a new phase in its history.

== Business Activities ==
MIS' business is based around six main value streams (business activities) but since 2008 has gained 4 more as acquisitions and start-ups.

=== Main Value Streams ===
- Fabrication
- EPC
- New Build
- Refurb
- Tech Services
- Sunbelt Safety

=== Acquisitions and Start-ups ===
- Rig Metals: Rig Metals LLC was acquired by MIS in 2008. It has ten years' experience in the region providing oilfield related engineering and steel fabrication contracting services to the offshore and onshore rig industry.
- EPI: was launched in 2010 and focuses on EPC and EPCM projects in markets such as Abu Dhabi, Saudi Arabia, Qatar, and Oman
- Production Services: was established in 2010. It will be focusing on the provision of oil & gas production equipment and services for both onshore and offshore developments
- Litwin PEL: was acquired by MIS in September 2010. It is an Abu Dhabi-based EPC and Engineering Services company catering to the Middle East and Africa Oil and Gas sector.

== Operations ==
The company's operations span several markets: Sharjah UAE where the company has 200,000 m^{2} quayside facilities in Port Khalid; Kuwait, Qatar and Saudi Arabia under the name MIS Arabia (a joint venture). MIS' geographical footprint also covers Egypt, Kazakhstan and Iraq.
