= Zafeen =

French-bred Thoroughbred racehorse

- Sire: Zafonic
- Grandsire: Gone West
- Dam: Shy Lady
- Damsire: Kaldoun
- Sex: Stallion
- Foaled: 25 April 2000
- Country: France
- Colour: Bay
- Breeder: Gainsborough Stud
- Owner: Jaber Abdullah
- Trainer: Mick Channon
- Record: 11: 3-4-0
- Earnings: £342,967

Major wins
- Mill Reef Stakes (2002); St James's Palace Stakes (2003)

Zafeen (25 April 2000) was a French-bred Thoroughbred racehorse and sire. Trained in the United Kingdom, he showed good form as a two-year-old in 2002, winning two of his six races including the Mill Reef Stakes and finishing second in the Prix Morny. In the following year he finished second in the 2000 Guineas, won the St James's Palace Stakes at Royal Ascot and was rated the best three-year-old over one mile in Europe and North America. He was retired to stud at the end of the year and had moderate success as a sire of winners.

== Background ==
Zafeen is a "huge" bay horse standing more than 16.2 hands high, with a white coronet on his right hind foot, bred in France by Maktoum bin Rashid Al Maktoum's Gainsborough Stud. He was sired by Zafonic, the best European two-year-old of 1992 who went on to win the 2000 Guineas in the following year. The best of Zafonic's other offspring included Xaar, and Zee Zee Top. His dam Shy Lady was a Listed race winner in Germany and was descended from Shy Dawn, the dam of Opening Verse. Zafeen began his racing career in the ownership of Jaber Abdullah and was trained at West Ilsley in Berkshire by Mick Channon.

== Racing career ==
=== 2002: two-year-old season ===
Zafeen began his racing career in a six furlong maiden race at Salisbury Racecourse on 5 July. He started the 5/6 favourite but was beaten half a length by Big Smoke after hanging badly to the left in the final furlong. Three weeks later over the same course and distance he started odds-on favourite for a similar event and recorded his first success, taking the lead a furlong out and winning by three and a half lengths. In this race he was ridden by Steve Drowne who partnered him in his next seven races. Jaber Abullah's racing manager Joe Mercer described the winner as a "big, immature horse" who might need time to develop.

Despite Mercer's comments, Zafeen was then sent to France and moved up sharply in class to contest the Group One Prix Morny at Deauville Racecourse on 25 August. Starting an 11/1 outsider in a six-runner field, he took the lead in the straight before being overtaken 200 metres from the finish and beaten three quarters of a length by Elusive City. On his return to England, Zafeen started 8/11 favourite for the Group Two Mill Reef Stakes at Newbury Racecourse on 20 September. His opponents included the Norfolk Stakes winner Baron's Pit and the Cherry Hinton Stakes runner-up Cassis. Before the race, Channon commented that the colt had "really thrived" since returning from France. Zafeen raced in second place before taking the lead a quarter of a mile from the finish and won "readily" by three quarters of a length from Monsieur Bond with Cassis in third.

On his last two starts of 2002, Zafeen ran in two of Britain's most prestigious races for juveniles. In the Middle Park Stakes over six furlongs at Newmarket Racecourse he finished fifth of the ten runners behind Oasis Dream, after appearing to be outpaced in the closing stages. He was moved up to seven furlongs for the Dewhurst Stakes at the same track sixteen days later and ran fourth behind the 25/1 outsider Tout Seul.

=== 2003: three-year-old season ===
Zafeen's three-year-old debut came in the Greenham Stakes (a trial race for the 2000 Guineas) over seven furlongs at Newbury. He took the lead a quarter of a mile from the finish before being overtaken by Muqbil in the final furlong and finishing second, one and a quarter lengths behind the winner. On 3 May the colt started a 33/1 outsider behind the favourite Hold That Tiger in a twenty-runner field for the 2000 Guineas over the Rowley Mile at Newmarket, with the other contenders including his previous rivals Muqbil, Tout Seul and Monsieur Bond. The colt briefly struggled to obtain a clear run a furlong out but finished strongly to take second place, three-quarters of a length behind the winner Refuse To Bend. Three weeks later Zafeen was sent to Ireland for the Irish 2,000 Guineas on soft ground at the Curragh and started the 11/2 third favourite. He raced just behind the leaders until the last three furlongs but then dropped away and finished fifteenth of the sixteen runners behind Indian Haven, who won by a length from the Aidan O'Brien-trained France.

Darryll Holland took over from Drowne when Zafeen was one of eleven colts to contest the 158th running of the St James's Palace Stakes at Royal Ascot on 17 June. The lightly-raced Heron Stakes winner Kalaman (later renamed Oriental Magic) started 5/2 favourite ahead of Clodovil (Poule d'Essai des Poulains), and Indian Haven with Zafeen Next in the betting on 8/1. The other runners included Hold That Tiger, Tout Seul, France, Martillo (Mehl-Mülhens-Rennen) and Statue of Liberty (Coventry Stakes). Holland positioned the colt behind the leaders as France led the field until the straight. Zafeen hung to the right a he began hi challenge a quarter of a mile out but recovered to overtake France approaching the final furlong and then held off the late run of Kalaman to win by a length. There was a gap of three lengths back to Martillo who took third ahead of Hold That Tiger and Clodovil. The closing stages of the race where extremely rough, with several horses being badly hampered, but Zafeen avoided most of the trouble. The Independent's Richard Edmondson likened Zafeen to a man who had emerged from the toilet in the aftermath of a bar-room brawl and picked his way through the wreckage. A "hyperventilating" Channon said "When he kicked I knew it would take a bloody good horse to beat him. I love winning anywhere but this is a bit special". Channon also explained that the change in jockey had been on the insistence of Jaber Abdullah, saying "I feel sorry for Steve (Drowne). He did nothing wrong in Ireland, but that is the way it goes sometimes" and admitted that the colt's performance at the Curragh had left him and the stable team "scratching our heads" for an explanation.

A week later, Channon said that the colt would be given a short break from racing, saying "He's been asked to go for everything up to now and deserves a rest".

On his final appearance of the season, Zafeen was matched against older horses in the Sussex Stakes at Goodwood on 30 July. The race produced a five-way blanket finish, with Zafeen, having briefly led the field in the straight finishing fourth, beaten a head, a short head and a neck by Reel Buddy, Statue of Liberty and Norse Dancer, and a neck in front of Moon Ballad. He was subsequently transferred to the ownership of Godolphin but did not race again.

== Assessment ==
In the International Classification for 2003 (which rated horses racing in Europe, North America and Japan), Zafeen was rated the best three-year-old over one mile and the equal twenty-eighth best racehorse of any age or sex.

== Stud record ==
Zafeen was retired from racing to become a breeding stallion for the Darley Stud. After being based at the Overbury Stud in Gloucestershire until October 2009 when he was sold privately to the Haras du Petit Tellier in Normandy. His stud fee for 2015 was €7000.

He has not been particularly successful but has sired the Prix d'Arenberg winner This Time as well as the Listed winners Aventador (Prix Ridgway) and Son Cesio (Prix Hampton).

== Pedigree ==
Pedigree of Zafeen (FR), bay stallion, 2000
Sire Zafonic (USA) 1990	Gone West (USA); 1984	Mr. Prospector	Raise a Native
Sire Zafonic (USA) 1990	Gone West (USA); 1984	Mr. Prospector	Gold Digger
Sire Zafonic (USA) 1990	Gone West (USA); 1984	Secrettame	Secretariat
Sire Zafonic (USA) 1990	Gone West (USA); 1984	Secrettame	Tamerett
Sire Zafonic (USA) 1990	Zaizafon (USA); 1982	The Minstrel (CAN)	Northern Dancer
Sire Zafonic (USA) 1990	Zaizafon (USA); 1982	The Minstrel (CAN)	Fleur
Sire Zafonic (USA) 1990	Zaizafon (USA); 1982	Mofida (GB)	Right Tack
Sire Zafonic (USA) 1990	Zaizafon (USA); 1982	Mofida (GB)	Wold Lass
Dam Shy Lady (FR) 1994	Kaldoun (FR); 1975	Caro (IRE)	Fortino(FR)
Dam Shy Lady (FR) 1994	Kaldoun (FR); 1975	Caro (IRE)	Chambord (GB)
Dam Shy Lady (FR) 1994	Kaldoun (FR); 1975	Katana	Le Haar
Dam Shy Lady (FR) 1994	Kaldoun (FR); 1975	Katana	Embellie
Dam Shy Lady (FR) 1994	Shy Danceuse [sic] (FR); 1989	Groom Dancer (USA)	Blushing Groom (FR)
Dam Shy Lady (FR) 1994	Shy Danceuse [sic] (FR); 1989	Groom Dancer (USA)	Featherhill (FR)
Dam Shy Lady (FR) 1994	Shy Danceuse [sic] (FR); 1989	Shy Princess (USA)	Irish River (FR)
Dam Shy Lady (FR) 1994	Shy Danceuse [sic] (FR); 1989	Shy Princess (USA)	Shy Dawn (Family: 21-a)
