= Prix de Flore (horse race) =

Flat horse race in France

- Class: Group 3
- Location: Saint-Cloud Racecourse; Saint-Cloud, France
- Inaugurated: 1893; 133 years ago
- Race type: Flat / Thoroughbred
- Website: france-galop.com

Race information
- Distance: 2,100 metres (1m 2½f)
- Surface: Turf
- Track: Left-handed
- Qualification: Three-years-old and up fillies and mares exc. G1 winners this year
- Weight: 54 kg (3yo); 56 kg (4yo+); Penalties; 3 kg for Group 2 winners * 3 kg if two Group 3 wins * 1½ kg if one Group 3 win * * since January 1
- Purse: €80,000 (2014); 1st: €40,000

Prix de Flore
2025
| Light The Ghost | Ginalyah | Zia Agnese |

Previous years
2024
Legend | Iznik | Understated
2023
Village Voice | Manisha | Tygress
2022
Tranquil Lady | Rumi | Manisha
2021
Sweet Lady | Jupyra | Anasia

2020-2011
2020
Grand Glory | Solsticia | Samasthiti
2019
Spirit Of Nelson | Mashael | Tosen Gift
2018
Ligne D'Or | Shahnaza | Queen Of Time
2017
Intimation | Son Macia | Listen In
2016
Loving Things | Switching | Furia Cruzada
2015
Si Luna | Bourree | Persona Grata
2014
Fate | Bocaiuva | Sparkling Beam
2013
Narniyn | Gaga | Vally Jem
2012
Lil'Wing | La Peinture | Omana
2011
Izzi Top | Albaraah | Andromeda Galaxy

2010-2001
2010
Board Meeting | La Boum | Rosanara
2009
Celimene | Shemiyla | Rainbow Dancing
2008
Albisola | Light Green | Tres Rapide
2007
La Boum | Concentric | Noble Ginger
2006
Miss Salvador | Wingspan | Bastet
2005
In Clover | Maredsous | Lake Toya
2004
Australie | Elopa | Dream Play
2003
Visorama | Commercante | Actrice
2002
Trumbaka | Carib Lady | Arlesienne
2001
Miliana | Kentucky Rose | Five Fishes

2000-1990
2000
Audacieuse | Beyond The Waves | La Juriste
1999
Louve | Marie De Bayeux | Histoire Sainte
1998
Moteck | Borgia | Gazelle Royale
1997
Palme D'Or | Lomita | La Nana
1996
Dance Treat | Dapprima | Blue Water
1995
Tamise | Suivez La | Loretta Gianni
1994
Allez Les Trois | Lafille de General | Sunrise Song
1993
Oxava | Chesa Plana | Royale Chantou
1992
Sporades | Fabulous Hostess | La Tirana
1991
La Tritona | La Tirana | Fleur Du Manoir
1990
Fleur Du Manoir | Leariva | Silk Petal

The Prix de Flore is a Group 3 flat horse race in France open to thoroughbred fillies and mares aged three years or older. It is run at Saint-Cloud over a distance of 2,100 metres (about 1 mile and 2½ furlongs), and it is scheduled to take place each year in late October.

== History ==
Despite being scheduled for the autumn, the event is named after Flora, a Roman goddess associated with spring. It was established in 1893, and was originally held at Maisons-Laffitte. It was initially restricted to three-year-olds and contested over 2,000 metres. It was extended to 2,100 metres in 1898.

The race reverted to 2,000 metres in 1913. It was abandoned throughout World War I, with no running from 1914 to 1918.

The event was switched to Saint-Cloud and increased to 2,100 metres in 1925. It was restored to 2,000 metres in 1935. A longer spell over 2,100 metres began in 1938.

The Prix de Flore was cancelled twice during World War II, in 1939 and 1940. It was staged at Longchamp in 1941 and 1942, Maisons-Laffitte in 1943, and Le Tremblay in 1944. It took place at Longchamp again in 1945 and 1954.

The present system of race grading was introduced in 1971, and the Prix de Flore was classed at Group 3 level. It was opened to older fillies and mares in 1981.

== Records ==
Most successful horse:

- no horse has won this race more than once

Leading jockey (5 wins):

- Olivier Peslier – Oxava (1993), Tamise (1995), Palme d'Or (1997), Louve (1999), Audacieuse (2000)
- Christophe Soumillon – Miliana (2001), Visorama (2003), Si Luna (2015), Loving Things (2016)

Leading trainer (6 wins):

- André Fabre – Fly Me (1983), Sporades (1992), Tamise (1995), Palme d'Or (1997), Louve (1999), Visorama (2003)

Leading owner (8 wins):

- Marcel Boussac – Lasarte (1920), Durzetta (1921), Caravelle (1943), Damaka (1951), Airelle (1953), Phigalia (1959), Ydra (1964), Demia (1977)

== Winners since 1979 ==
| Year | Winner | Age | Jockey | Trainer | Owner | Time |
|---|---|---|---|---|---|---|
| 1979 | Indoor | 3 | Michel Jerome | Gilles Delloye | Ludovic Cattan |
| 1980 | Benicia | 3 | Freddy Head | Criquette Head | Ghislaine Head |
| 1981 | Votre Altesse | 3 | Alfred Gibert | Mitri Saliba | Mahmoud Fustok |
| 1982 | Buchanette | 3 | Gérard Dubroeucq | Maurice Zilber | Naji Nahas | 2:27.90 |
| 1983 | Fly Me | 3 | Alain Lequeux | André Fabre | Moufid Dabaghi |
| 1984 | Prattle On | 3 | Cash Asmussen | Robert Collet | Jim Mullion |
| 1985 | Gay Hellene | 3 | Alfred Gibert | Dick Hern | Sir Michael Sobell |
| 1986 | Gesedeh | 3 | John Reid | Michael Jarvis | Ahmed Al Maktoum |
| 1987 | Only a Rumour | 4 | Gérard Dubroeucq | David Smaga | Carlos Stelling |
| 1988 | Masmouda | 4 | Eric Saint-Martin | Alain de Royer-Dupré | HH Aga Khan IV | 2:16.70 |
| 1989 | Bex | 3 | Willie Carson | Robert Armstrong | Oceanic Ltd | 2:19.60 |
| 1990 | Fleur du Manoir | 4 | Cash Asmussen | Guy Cherel | Jean-Claude Evain | 2:26.40 |
| 1991 | La Tritona (Note: La Tirana finished first in 1991, but she was relegated to second place following a stewards' inquiry) | 4 | Dominique Boeuf | Pascal Bary | Lady O'Reilly | 2:20.80 |
| 1992 | Sporades | 3 | Sylvain Guillot | André Fabre | Paul de Moussac | 2:21.20 |
| 1993 | Oxava | 3 | Olivier Peslier | Élie Lellouche | Charles Maarek | 2:17.90 |
| 1994 | Allez les Trois | 3 | Freddy Head | Criquette Head | Haras d'Etreham | 2:21.80 |
| 1995 | Tamise | 3 | Olivier Peslier | André Fabre | Daniel Wildenstein | 2:15.10 |
| 1996 | Dance Treat | 4 | Cash Asmussen | Dominique Sépulchre | Peter Pritchard | 2:18.20 |
| 1997 | Palme d'Or | 3 | Olivier Peslier | André Fabre | Daniel Wildenstein | 2:16.90 |
| 1998 | Moteck | 3 | Davy Bonilla | Élie Lellouche | Claude Cohen | 2:21.70 |
| 1999 | Louve | 3 | Olivier Peslier | André Fabre | Daniel Wildenstein | 2:19.70 |
| 2000 | Audacieuse | 3 | Olivier Peslier | Élie Lellouche | Woodcote Stud | 2:22.20 |
| 2001 | Miliana | 4 | Christophe Soumillon | Alain de Royer-Dupré | HH Aga Khan IV | 2:23.60 |
| 2002 | Trumbaka | 3 | Ronan Thomas | Criquette Head-Maarek | Wertheimer et Frère | 2:26.00 |
| 2003 | Visorama | 3 | Christophe Soumillon | André Fabre | Lagardère Family | 2:18.70 |
| 2004 | Australie | 3 | Thierry Jarnet | Richard Gibson | Hubie de Burgh | 2:16.40 |
| 2005 | In Clover | 3 | Davy Bonilla | Freddy Head | George Strawbridge | 2:20.30 |
| 2006 | Miss Salvador | 3 | Thierry Jarnet | Stéphane Wattel | Jean-Louis Pariente | 2:19.70 |
| 2007 | La Boum | 4 | Christophe Soumillon | Robert Collet | Emmanuel Trussardi | 2:15.80 |
| 2008 | Albisola | 3 | Johan Victoire | Robert Collet | Gerry Oldham | 2:18.60 |
| 2009 | Celimene | 3 | Yann Lerner | Carlos Lerner | Gérard Laboureau | 2:19.40 |
| 2010 | Board Meeting (Note: Valasyra was first in 2010, but she was subsequently disqualified after testing positive for a banned substance) | 4 | Anthony Crastus | Élie Lellouche | Ecurie Wildenstein | 2:19.60 |
| 2011 | Izzi Top | 3 | William Buick | John Gosden | Helena Springfield Ltd | 2:16.70 |
| 2012 | Lil'Wing | 3 | Christophe Lemaire | Alain de Royer-Dupré | Ecurie Wildenstein | 2:24.30 |
| 2013 | Narniyn | 3 | Christophe Lemaire | Alain de Royer-Dupré | HH Aga Khan | 2:21.34 |
| 2014 | Fate | 5 | Stéphane Pasquier | Alain de Royer-Dupré | Fair Salinia Ltd | 2:15.37 |
| 2015 | Si Luna | 6 | Christophe Soumillon | William Mongil | Gestut Hof Iserneichen | 2:19.11 |
| 2016 | Loving Things | 4 | Christophe Soumillon | Luca Cumani | Normandie Stud | 2:15.58 |
| 2017 | Intimation | 5 | Mickael Barzalona | Michael Stoute | Cheveley Park Stud | 2:17.69 |
| 2018 | Ligne d'Or | 3 | Vincent Cheminaud | André Fabre | Ballymore Thoroughbred Ltd | 2:17.48 |
| 2019 | Spirit Of Nelson | 4 | Maxime Guyon | Jerome Reynier | Jean-Claude Seroul | 2:25.69 |
| 2020 | Grand Glory | 4 | Pierre-Charles Boudot | Gianluca Bietolini | Frassetto, D'Amato & Pietrangelo | 2:24.92 |
| 2021 | Sweet Lady | 3 | Ioritz Mendizabal | Francis-Henri Graffard | Gemini Stud | 2:18.38 |
| 2022 | Tranquil Lady | 3 | Dylan McMonagle | Joseph O'Brien | Teme Valley Racing | 2:25.64 |
| 2023 | Village Voice | 3 | Cristian Demuro | Jessica Harrington | P K Cooper | 2:23.52 |

== Earlier winners ==
- 1893: Mistress Gilly
- 1894: Frida
- 1895: Kasbah
- 1896: Hero
- 1897: Quilda
- 1898: Melina
- 1899: Sesara
- 1900: Semendria
- 1901: Lena
- 1902: La Loreley
- 1903: Rose de Mai
- 1904: Profane
- 1905: Luzerne
- 1906: Arabie / Sais *
- 1907: All Mine
- 1908: Sauge Pourpree
- 1909: Ronde de Nuit
- 1910: La Francaise
- 1911: La Boheme
- 1912: Wagram
- 1913: Trinqueuse
- 1914–18: no race
- 1919: Fausta
- 1920: Lasarte
- 1921: Durzetta
- 1922: Lady Elinor
- 1923: Concorde
- 1924: Sweet Auburn
- 1925: La Habanera
- 1926: La Caporale
- 1927: Lithography
- 1928: Lilybee
- 1929: Rollybuchy
- 1930: Kill Lady
- 1931: Campaspe
- 1932: La Bourrasque
- 1933: Revery
- 1934: Rarity
- 1935: Medea
- 1936: La Pallarea
- 1937: Solace
- 1938: Feerie
- 1939–40: no race
- 1941: Dauphine
- 1942: Guirlande
- 1943: Caravelle
- 1944: Oalgabla
- 1945: Raita
- 1946: Melibob
- 1947: Folina
- 1948: Phydile
- 1949: La Belle Aventure
- 1950: Polaire
- 1951: Damaka
- 1952: La Mirambule
- 1953: Airelle
- 1954: Toundra
- 1955: Double Luck
- 1956: Belle
- 1957: Kalitka
- 1958: La Touques
- 1959: Phigalia
- 1960: Free Moon
- 1961: Grande Ligne
- 1962:
- 1963: Chicane
- 1964: Ydra
- 1965:
- 1966: Solitude
- 1967: Percale
- 1968:
- 1969: Friedensbotschaft
- 1970: Chamade
- 1971: Sega Ville
- 1972: Siliciana
- 1973: My Great Aunt
- 1974: Ninfae
- 1975: Lighted Glory
- 1976: No No Nanette
- 1977: Demia
- 1978: North Sea

* The 1906 race was a dead-heat and has joint winners.

== See also ==
- List of French flat horse races
