= Great Warsaw Race =

Polish horse race

- Location: Służewiec Racecourse
- Date: the last Sunday of September
- Distance: 2600m
- Surface: Turf

The Great Warsaw Race (Polish: Wielka Warszawska) is the largest horse race in Poland, held annually at the Służewiec Racecourse in Warsaw, Poland.

== History ==
Nagroda Wielka Warszawska was held for the first time in 1895, modeled on the French Grand Prix de Paris race.

Until 1904, it had a distance of about 3,200 m. For political reasons, in the years 1905-1912, 1915–1916 and 1919, there were breaks in its play. In 1913 and in 1917 and 1918 (in Odessa) it was held over a distance of 2,667 m. From 1920, its distance was 2,800 m, and from 1933 - 2,400 m, the same as after World War II in 1946-48 . The current distance (2600 m) has remained unchanged since 1949.

In 2023, the European Pattern Committee upgraded the race to Listed status.

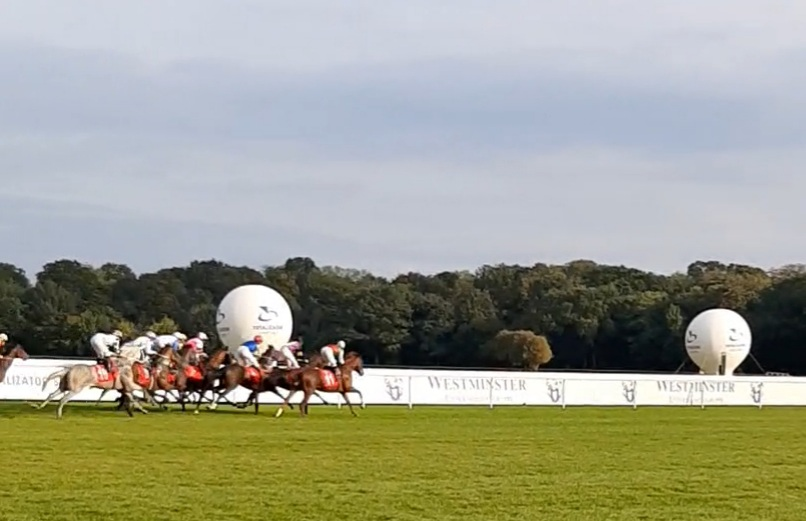
Wielka Warszawska 2022

== Records ==
=== Speed record ===
- 2:40,3 - Intens (2011)

=== Most wins ===
- 2 - Madame Ferrari (1901, 1902)
- 2 - Jawor II (1933, 1934)
- 2 - Turysta (1947, 1948)
- 2 - Demona (1964, 1965)
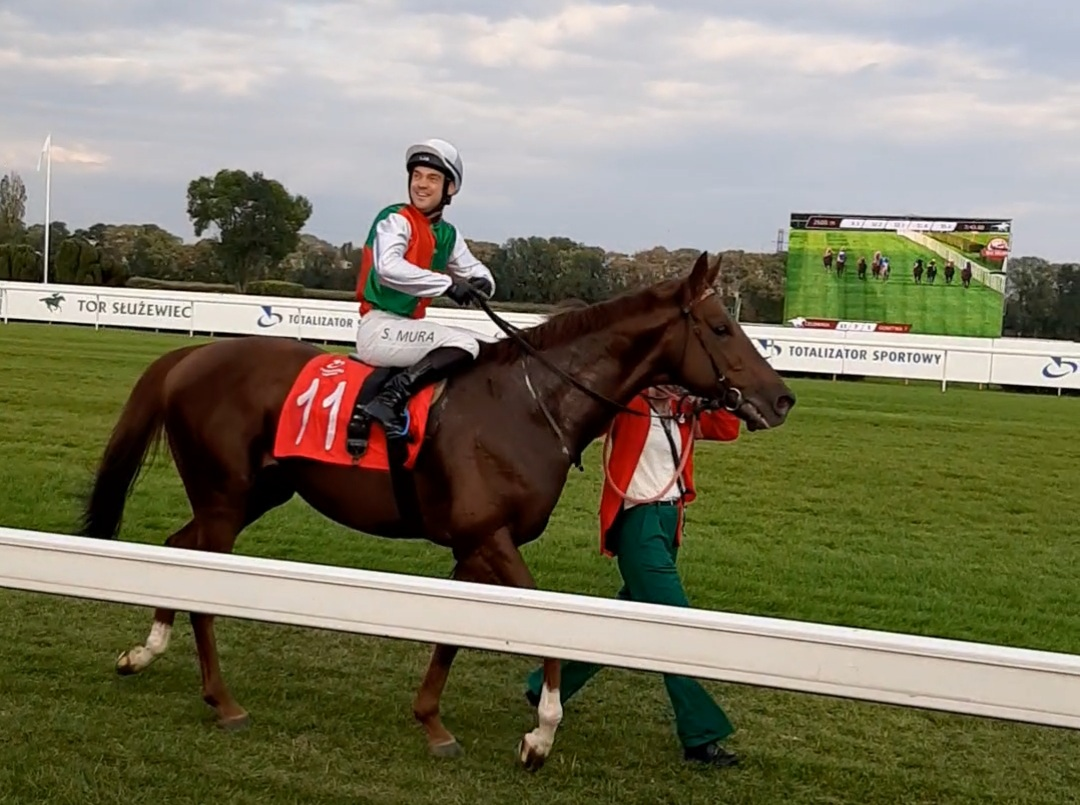
- Night Tornado
  2 - Erotyk (1968, 1969)
- 2 - Kliwia (1991, 1992)
- 2 - San Luis (2004, 2005)
- 2 - Night Tornado (2021, 2022)

=== Most wins by a jockey ===
- 8 - Jerzy Jednaszewski (1957, 1959, 1960, 1962, 1967, 1970, 1973, 1977)
- 4 - Mieczysław Mełnicki (1964, 1965, 1981, 1986)
- 4 - Jerzy Ochocki (1985, 1987, 1988, 2006)
- 4 - Janusz Kozłowski (1983, 1989, 1991, 1992)

=== Most wins by a trainer ===
- 10 - Andrzej Walicki (1971, 1974, 1986, 1989, 1991, 1992, 2004, 2005, 2013, 2014)
- 7 - Stanisław Molenda (1967, 1968, 1969, 1970, 1973, 1975, 1977)

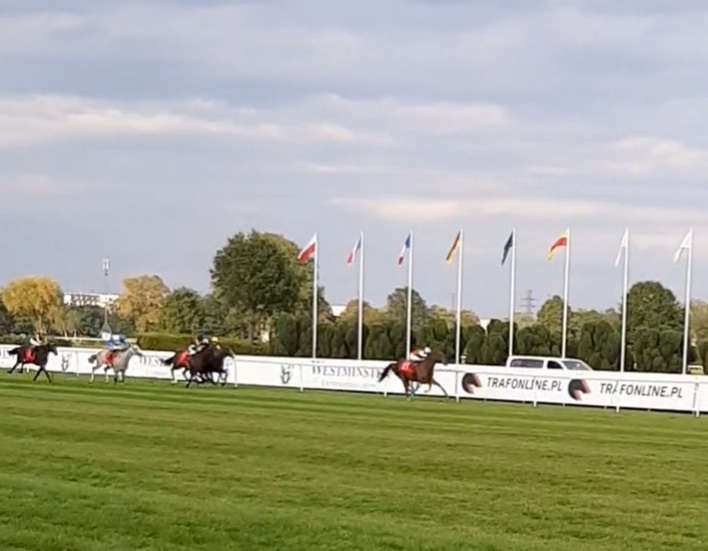
WIelka Warszawska 2022

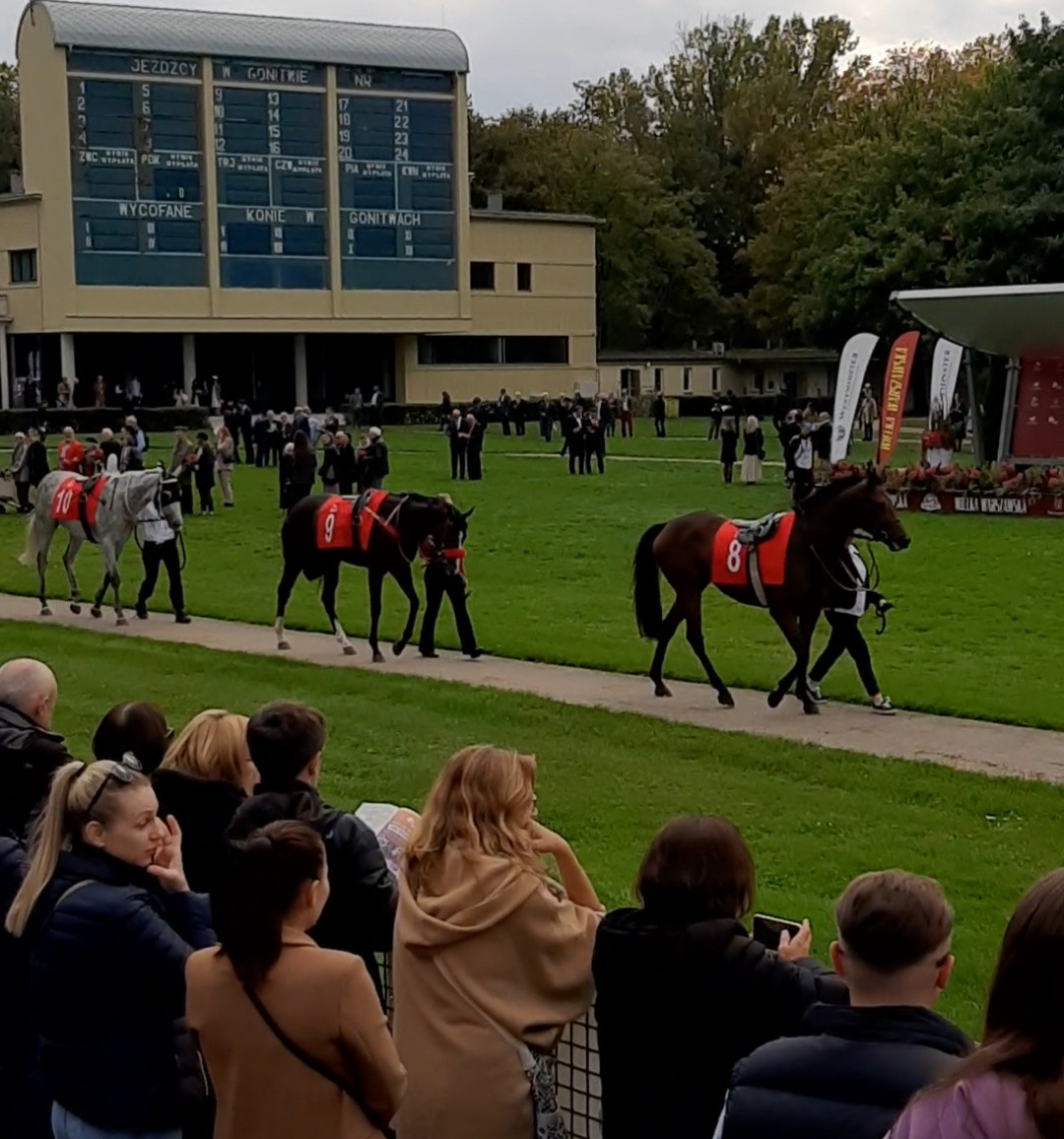
Wielka Warszawska 2022

== Winners ==
Year	Name	Jockey	Trainer	Time
1895	Aschabad			
1901	Madame Ferrari			
1902	Madame Ferrari			
1926	Forward			
1933	Jawor II			
1934	Jawor II			
1946	Izan			
1947	Turysta	Kazimierz Jagodziński	Aleksander Pacurko	2'32,5"
1948	Turysta	Walenty Stasiak	Aleksander Pacurko	2'36,0"
1949	Ruch	Józef Dorosz	Marian Jednaszewski	2'48,0"
1950	Turf	Walenty Stasiak	Stanisław Kowalski	2'50,0"
1951	Skarbnik	J. Szczepaniak	M. Molenda	2'45,0"
1952	Wizjer	Marian Krysiak	Stanisław Pasternak	3'03,0"
1953	Dewiza	Michał Lipowicz	Jan Paszkiewicz	2'46,0"
1954	De Corte	Władysław Biesiadziński	Konstanty Chatizow	2'46,0"
1955	Sombrero	Michał Lipowicz	Jan Paszkiewicz	2'45,0"
1956	Narraganset	Władysław Biesiadziński	Leon Chatizow	2'55,0"
1957	Peary	Jerzy Jednaszewski	M. Molenda	2'50,0"
1958	Issos	Michał Lipowicz	Adam Tuchołka	2'52,0"
1959	Surmak	Jerzy Jednaszewski	Stanisław Pasternak	2'47,0"
1960	Donna Aqui	Jerzy Jednaszewski	Aleksander Falewicz	2'55,0"
1961	Mister Tory	L. Bujdens	Jan Paszkiewicz	2'52,0"
1962	Jurysdykcja	Jerzy Jednaszewski	H. Szymański	2'50,0"
1963	San Remo	Kazimierz Jagodziński	Bogdan Ziemiański	2'58,0"
1964	Demona	Mieczysław Mełnicki	Stefan Michalczyk	2'54,0"
1965	Demona	Mieczysław Mełnicki	Stefan Michalczyk	2'45,0"
1966	Cross	Józef Paliński	Leon Chatizow	2'49,0"
1967	Dolores	Jerzy Jednaszewski	Stanisław Molenda	2'47,0"
1968	Erotyk	Vasile Hutuleac	Stanisław Molenda	2'49,0"
1969	Erotyk	Vasile Hutuleac	Stanisław Molenda	2'46,0"
1970	Driada	Jerzy Jednaszewski	Stanisław Molenda	2'47,0"
1971	Daglezja	Vasile Hutuleac	Andrzej Walicki	2'50,0"
1972	Dipol	Stanisław Dzięcina	Józef Paliński	2'53,0"
1973	Dargin	Jerzy Jednaszewski	Stanisław Molenda	2'44,0"
1974	Kasjan	Stanisław Dzięcina	Andrzej Walicki	2'51,0"
1975	Dej	Bolesław Mazurek	Stanisław Molenda	2'54,0"
1976	Iranda	Wojciech Ryniak	Stanisław Dzięcina	2'56,0"
1977	Dersław	Jerzy Jednaszewski	Stanisław Molenda	2'51,0"
1978	Pawiment	Andrzej Tylicki	Jerzy Jednaszewski	2'54,0"
1979	Diakowa	Wojciech Ryniak	Mieczysław Żuber	2'56,0"
1980	Dixieland	Roman Maciejak	Józef Paliński	2'48,0"
1981	Jarabub	Mieczysław Mełnicki	Stanisław Dzięcina	2'53,0"
1982	Sonora	Albin Rejek	Józef Paliński	2'46,0"
1983	Cisów	Janusz Kozłowski	Dorota Kałuba	2'53,0"
1984	Cardiff	Józef Gęborys	Łukasz Abgarowicz	2'52,0"
1985	Dżet	Jerzy Ochocki	R. Bodnar	2'52,0"
1986	Księżyc	Mieczysław Mełnicki	Andrzej Walicki	2'46,0"
1987	Omen	Jerzy Ochocki	Stanisław Sałagaj	2'44,0"
1988	Dietmar	Jerzy Ochocki	Stanisław Sałagaj	2'49,0"
1989	Kesar	Janusz Kozłowski	Andrzej Walicki	2'51,0"
1990	Novara	Tomasz Dul	Mirosław Stawski	2'48,5"
1991	Kliwia	Janusz Kozłowski	Andrzej Walicki	2'45,0"
1992	Kliwia	Janusz Kozłowski	Andrzej Walicki	2'47,0"
1993	Upsala	Rumen Ganczew-Panczew	Stanisław Sałagaj	2'43,0"
1994	Montauciel	Pal Kallai	Ferenc Farkas	2'45,5"
1995	Wolarz	Katarzyna Szymczuk	W. Sikorski	2'49,0"
1996	Bella Donna	Bolesław Mazurek	Grzegorz Kaczmarek	2'47,2"
1997	Zagara	Józef Gęborys	Maciej Janikowski	2'51,0"
1998	Arctic	Tomasz Dul	Dorota Kałuba	2'56,4"
1999	Vishnu	P.A. Johnson	Chr. Fhr von der Recke	2'44,7"
2000	Dżamajka	Tomasz Dul	Bogdan Strójwąs	2'44,7"
2001	Kombinacja	Bolesław Mazurek	Emil Zahariev	2'48,0"
2002	Caitano	William Mongil	Andreas Schutz	2'45,0"
2003	Tulipa	Sergey Vasyutov	Dorota Kałuba	2'48,7"
2004	San Luis	Piotr Piątkowski	Andrzej Walicki	2'44,2"
2005	San Luis	Piotr Piątkowski	Andrzej Walicki	2'41,5"
2006	Night Express	Jerzy Ochocki	Józef Siwonia	2'52,0"
2007	Equip Hill	Per Anders Graberg	B. Bo	2'41,7"
2008	Merlini	Per Anders Graberg	Maciej Janikowski	2'46,8"
2009	Hipoliner	Anton Turgaev	Józef Siwonia	2'42,0"
2010	Dancing Moon	Victor Popov	Wojciech Olkowski	2'42,6"
2011	Intens	Tomas Lukasek	Krzysztof Ziemiański	2'40,3''
2012	Camerun	Piotr Piątkowski	Marek Nowakowski	2'45,4"
2013	Patronus	Szczepan Mazur	Andrzej Walicki	2'47,8"
2014	Greek Sphere	Antonio Fresu	Andrzej Walicki	2'43,1"
2015	Va Bank	Per Anders Graberg	Maciej Janikowski	2'51,2"
2016	Caccini	Tomas Lukasek	Adam Wyżyk	2'51,5"
2017	Bush Brave	Tomas Lukasek	Wojciech Olkowski	2'54,0"
2018	Rain and Sun	Anton Turgaev	Janusz Kozłowski	2'44,5"
2019	Pride of Nelson	Michal Abik	Piotr Piątkowski	2’44,97”
2020	Nagano Gold	Vincent Cheminaud	Vaclav Luka	2’43,7”
2021	Night Tornado	Stefano Mura	Krzysztof Ziemiański	2’44,3”
2022	Night Tornado	Stefano Mura	Krzysztof Ziemiański	2'43,6"
2023	Le Destrier	Szczepan Mazur	Marlena Stanisławska	2'41,1''
2024	Kaneshya	Adrie de Vries	Henri Alex Pantall	2'47,4''
2025	Bremen	Kieran Shoemark	Krzysztof Ziemiański	2'43,3''
2026	Tardar	Marvin Grandin	Alicja Karkosa	2'44,6''
