= Prix Allez France =

Flat horse race in France

- Class: Group 3
- Location: Chantilly Racecourse; Chantilly, France
- Inaugurated: 2004
- Race type: Flat / Thoroughbred
- Website: france-galop.com

Race information
- Distance: 2,000 metres (1¼ miles)
- Surface: Turf
- Track: Right-handed
- Qualification: Four-years-old and up fillies and mares excluding Group 1 winners *
- Weight: 55½ kg Allowances; 1 kg if not Group placed * Penalties; 3 kg for Group 2 winners * 2 kg for Group 3 winners * *since 1 June last year
- Purse: €80,000 (2019); 1st: €40,000

Prix Allez France
2025
Aventure	Mme Jourdain	Euboa

Previous years
2024
American Sonja	Pensee Du Jour	Sea The Lady
2023
India	Mqse De Sevigne	Rogue Millennium
2022
Grand Glory	Burgarita	Amazing Grace
2021
Ebaiyra	Raabihah	All Rumours

2020-2011
2019
Morgan Le Faye	Tosen Gift	Shahnaza
2018
Kitesurf	Listen In	Son Macia
2017
The Black Princess	Armande	Happy Approach
2016
Marypop	Nymeria	Contribution
2015
Mayhem	Sparkling Beam	Mambomiss
2014
Daksha	Entree	Siljan's Saga
2013
Romantica	Harem Lady	Victorinna
2012
Aquamarine	Haya Landa	Shareta
2011
Announce	Shamanova	Rock My Soul

2010-2004
2010
Shemiyla	Superstition	La Boum
2009
Shemima	Tres Rapide	Albisola
2008
Fair Breeze	Claire Et Bleu	Believe Me
2007
Macleya	Satwa Queen	Nickelle
2006
Paita	Bastet	Ysoldina
2005
Elopa	Diamond Tango	Miss Wind
2004
Pride	Russian Hill	Samando

The Prix Allez France is a Group 3 flat horse race in France open to thoroughbred fillies and mares aged four years or older. It is run over a distance of 2,000 metres (about 1¼ miles) at Chantilly in late April or early May.

== History ==
The event is named after Allez France, a successful mare trained at Chantilly during the 1970s. Her victories included the Prix de l'Arc de Triomphe in 1974.

The Prix Allez France was established in 2004, and the first running was won by Pride. It was one of several races for older fillies introduced that year across Europe. The races were designed as incentives to keep more fillies and mares from being exported or prematurely retired to stud.

== Records ==
Most successful horse:

- no horse has won this race more than once

Leading jockey (4 wins):

- Maxime Guyon – Announce (2011), Romantica (2013), Marypop (2016), Aventure (2025)

Leading trainer (5 wins):

- André Fabre – Macleya (2007), Announce (2011), Romantica (2013), Kitesurf (2018), Morgan Le Faye (2019)

Leading owner (2 wins):

- HH Aga Khan IV – Shemima (2009), Shemiyla (2010)

== Winners ==
Year	Winner	Age	Jockey	Trainer	Owner	Time
2004	Pride	4	Davy Bonilla	Alain de Royer-Dupré	NP Bloodstock Ltd	2:06.90
2005	Elopa	4	Andrasch Starke	Andreas Schütz	Stall Gamshof	2:01.60
2006	Paita	4	Olivier Peslier	Élie Lellouche	Teruya Yoshida	2:04.80
2007	Macleya	5	Stéphane Pasquier	André Fabre	Richard Thompson	2:01.60
2008	Fair Breeze	5	Andreas Helfenbein	Mario Hofer	Stall Margarethe	2:09.00
2009	Shemima	4	Christophe Soumillon	Alain de Royer-Dupré	HH Aga Khan IV	2:06.20
2010	Shemiyla	4	Christophe Lemaire	Alain de Royer-Dupré	HH Aga Khan IV	2:07.50
2011	Announce	4	Maxime Guyon	André Fabre	Khalid Abdullah	2:00.50
2012	Aquamarine	4	Thomas Huet	Mikel Delzangles	Ecurie Wildenstein	2:10.10
2013	Romantica	4	Maxime Guyon	André Fabre	Khalid Abdullah	2:04.30
2014	Daksha	4	Thierry Thulliez	Waldemar Hickst	Gestut Ittlingen	2:03.90
2015	Mayhem	4	Stéphane Pasquier	Philippe Sogorb	Anne-Marie Hayes	2:05.94
2016	Marypop	4	Maxime Guyon	Pia Brandt	Wood Hall Stud Ltd	2:04.27
2017	The Black Princess	4	Frankie Dettori	John Gosden	Robin Geffen	2:03.26
2018	Kitesurf (Note: The 2018 and 2019 runnings took place at Longchamp)	4	Mickael Barzalona	André Fabre	Godolphin	2:04.94
2019	Morgan Le Faye	5	Mickael Barzalona	André Fabre	Godolphin	2:04.43
2020	no race
2021	Ebaiyra	4	Christophe Soumillon	Alain de Royer-Dupré	HH Aga Khan IV	2:10.43
2022	Grand Glory	6	Cristian Demuro	Gianluca Bietolini	Haras De Hus	2:03.51
2023	India	5	René Piechulek	Waldemar Hickst	Gestüt Ittlingen	2:10.31
2024	American Sonja	4	Dylan Browne McMonagle	Joseph O'Brien	Mark Dobbin	2:08.30
2025	Aventure	4	Maxime Guyon	Christophe Ferland	Wertheimer et Frère	2:06.11
2026	Sunly	4	Christophe Soumillon	Francis-Henri Graffard	Juddmonte	2:04.44

== See also ==
- List of French flat horse races
