= Preis der Sparkassen-Finanzgruppe =

Preis der Sparkassen-Finanzgruppe (Spreti-Rennen)
- Class: Group 3
- Location: Iffezheim Racecourse; Baden-Baden, Germany
- Inaugurated: 1956
- Race type: Flat / Thoroughbred
- Sponsor: Sparkassen-Finanzgruppe
- Website: Baden-Baden

Race information
- Distance: 2,000 metres (1¼ miles)
- Surface: Turf
- Track: Left-handed
- Qualification: Four-years-old and up
- Weight: 57 kg Allowances; 1½ kg for fillies and mares 1 kg if not won €12,000 * Penalties; 3 kg for Group 1 winners * 2 kg for Group 2 winners * 1 kg for Group 3 winners * * since August 1 last year
- Purse: €55,000 (2011); 1st: €32,000

The Preis der Sparkassen-Finanzgruppe is a Group 3 flat horse race in Germany open to thoroughbreds aged four years or older. It is run at Baden-Baden over a distance of 2,000 metres (about 1¼ miles), and it is scheduled to take place each year in late August.

== History ==
The event was established in 1956, and it was originally called the Spreti-Rennen. It was initially contested over 2,400 metres.

The present system of race grading was introduced in Germany in 1972, and the Spreti-Rennen was classed at Group 3 level. It was cut to 2,200 metres in 1987, and to 2,000 metres in 1990.

The race became known as the Preis der Badischen Sparkassen in 1998, and it was renamed the Preis der Sparkassen-Finanzgruppe in 2001.

== Records ==
Most successful horse (2 wins):

- Turkrano – 1959, 1960
- Anatas – 1985, 1986
- Karinga Bay – 1992, 1993
- Elle Danzig – 1999, 2000
- Diamante – 2001, 2003
- Wiesenpfad – 2007, 2009

Leading jockey (6 wins):

- Georg Bocskai – Prairie Snoopy (1978), Tombos (1984), Anatas (1985, 1986), El Salto (1987), Turfkönig (1991)

Leading trainer (7 wins):

- Heinz Jentzsch – Lombard (1972), Schiwago (1973), Ebano (1977), Tombos (1984), Anatas (1985, 1986), El Salto (1987)

== Winners since 1971 ==
Year	Winner	Age	Jockey	Trainer	Time
1971	Segnes	4	Harald Ziese	W. Hessler	2:33.20
1972	Lombard	5	Fritz Drechsler	Heinz Jentzsch	2:31.90
1973	Schiwago	4	Fritz Drechsler	Heinz Jentzsch	2:33.60
1974	Rubens	5	Raimund Prinzinger	Oskar Langner	2:29.60
1975	Marduk	4	Peter Remmert	Hein Bollow	2:29.80
1976	Babant	4	Bruce Raymond	Oskar Langner	2:29.00
1977	Ebano	4	Ralf Suerland	Heinz Jentzsch	2:35.40
1978	Prairie Snoopy	4	Georg Bocskai	Bruno Schütz	2:29.20
1979	Lorimer	4	Peter Alafi	Sven von Mitzlaff	2:38.80
1980	Hohritt	6	David Wildman	Erich Pils	2:35.60
1981	Wauthi	4	Peter Remmert	Theo Grieper	2:27.90
1982	Ludovico	5	Peter Remmert	Harro Remmert	2:28.90
1983	Belesprit	5	Peter Schade	Sven von Mitzlaff	2:30.70
1984	Tombos	5	Georg Bocskai	Heinz Jentzsch	2:29.20
1985	Anatas	5	Georg Bocskai	Heinz Jentzsch	2:30.20
1986	Anatas	6	Georg Bocskai	Heinz Jentzsch	2:29.60
1987	El Salto	4	Georg Bocskai	Heinz Jentzsch	2:27.30
1988	Medicus	4	Lutz Mäder	Bruno Schütz	2:20.20
1989	Twist King	4	Dragan Ilic	Peter Lautner	2:17.10
1990	Bin Shaddad	6	Lutz Mäder	Erika Mäder	2:03.47
1991	Turfkönig	5	Georg Bocskai	Uwe Ostmann	2:02.70
1992	Karinga Bay	5	Brian Rouse	Geoff Lewis	2:03.06
1993	Karinga Bay	6	Brian Rouse	Gary L. Moore	2:04.45
1994	Cezanne	5	Gary Hind	Michael Stoute	2:05.71
1995	Hondero	5	Dominique Regnard	Börje Olsson	2:05.94
1996	Artan	4	Peter Schiergen	Martin Rölke	2:01.53
1997	Devil River Peek	5	Stephen Davies	Bruno Schütz	2:04.98
1998	Happy Change	4	Andreas Boschert	Andreas Wöhler	2:02.94
1999	Elle Danzig	4	Andrasch Starke	Andreas Schütz	2:02.47
2000	Elle Danzig	5	Andrasch Starke	Andreas Schütz	2:03.50
2001	Diamante	4	Andreas Suborics	Andreas Wöhler	2:03.02
2002	Tareno	4	Filip Minarik	Peter Schiergen	2:02.19
2003	Diamante	6	Eduardo Pedroza	Andreas Wöhler	2:05.85
2004	Soldier Hollow	4	William Mongil	Peter Schiergen	2:04.25
2005	Dalicia	4	Torsten Mundry	Peter Rau	2:02.06
2006	White Lightning	4	Rastislav Juracek	Uwe Stech	2:05.35
2007	Wiesenpfad	4	Adrie de Vries	Waldemar Hickst	2:00.83
2008	Prince Flori	5	Andrasch Starke	Sascha Smrczek	2:01.46
2009	Wiesenpfad	6	Andreas Suborics	Waldemar Hickst	2:04.00
2010	Budai	4	Alexander Pietsch	Waldemar Hickst	2:07.05
2011	Zazou	4	Andreas Suborics	Waldemar Hickst	2:09.19
2012	Mikhail Glinka	5	Mirco Demuro	A Savujev	2:06.37
2013	Polish Vulcano	5	Wladimir Panov	H-J Groschel	2:03.75
2014	Nausica Time	4	Andreas Helfenbein	S Smrczek	2:07.06
2015	Pas De Deux	5	Ian Ferguson	Yasmin Almenrader	2:07.04
2016	Va Bank	4	Martin Seidl	M Janikowski	2:04.89
2017	Palace Prince	5	Filip Minarik	Jean-Pierre Carvalho	2:01.77
2018	Wai Key Star	5	Bertrand Flandrin	Frau S Steinberg	2:03.80
2019	Alounak	4	Clement Lecoeuvre	Waldemar Hickst	2:01.67
2020	Wai Key Star	7	Sibylle Vogt	Frau S Steinberg	2:02.97
2021	Tabera	4	Maxim Pecheur	Miltcho G Mintchev	2:09.12
2022	Alaskasonne	4	Andreas Helfenbein	Markus Klug	2:07.83
2023	Mansour	6	Sibylle Vogt	Pavel Vovcenko	2:08.66
2024	Downtown	4	Thore Hammer Hansen	Henk Grewe	2:01.74
2025	Quest The Moon	9	Rene Piechulek	Frau S Steinberg	2:03.74
2026	Stingray	5	Leon Wolff	Marcel Weiß	2:06.95

== Earlier winners ==
- 1956: Nizam
- 1957: Franc Tireur
- 1958: Obermaat
- 1959: Turkrano
- 1960: Turkrano
- 1961: Alpsee
- 1962: Veni
- 1963: Novum
- 1964: Cher
- 1965: Wiesenklee
- 1966: Fontanus / Goldbube *
- 1967: Birgitz
- 1968: Norfolk
- 1969: Fant
- 1970: Tajo

* The 1966 race was a dead-heat and has joint winners.

== See also ==
- List of German flat horse races
