= Va Bank (horse) =

Polish racehorse

- Breed: Thoroughbred
- Sire: Archipenko
- Dam: Vinales
- Damsire: Dilshaan
- Sex: Male
- Country: Poland
- Color: Bay
- Owner: Team Valor International
- Trainer: Maciej Janikowski, Andreas Wohler

Awards
- 2015 Polish Triple Crown

Va Bank (foaled March 10, 2012) is a thoroughbred racing horse who won the 2015 Polish "triple crown". At the end of 2016, 50% of the shares were bought by Team Valor International. After that, he was transferred to trainer Andreas Wohler. Va Bank's last race was in 2019.

== Background ==
He was bred at Airlie Stud. He belonged to the first offspring of Archipenko and was the first foal of Vinales. In 2013 it was sold at the Tattersalls Ireland Yearling Sale auction. It was bought by Janusz Piotr Zienkiewicz and Barathbek Abdrakhmanov for 4,500 euros. Maciej Janikowski started training him. Before the debut of Va Bank, jockey Wiaczesław Szymczuk in an interview after his 1,000th victory, when asked on which horse he would win his 1001th win, replied that it would be Va Bank. However, the colt was withdrawn because he suffered a minor injury.

== Racing career ==
=== 2014: two-year-old season ===
Va Bank made his debut on August 23 in the maiden race under Marek Brezina. He won by 2 1/4 lengths. Then he took part in Nagroda Ministra Rolnictwa i Rozwoju Wsi. He won under Wiaczesław Szymczuk, gaining an advantage of 1 1/2 lengths over the favorite Zabava. In 2014, he started only once. He won Nagroda Mokotowska by 2 1/4 lengths and thus won the title of the winter favorite for the Derby.

=== 2015: three-year-old season ===
Va Bank started the season with a 2 1/4 length win in Nagroda Strzegomia under the leadership of Marek Brezina. On May 17, he won his first crown. He won the Nagroda Rulera by 3 lengths in 1'37.20 under Marek Brezina. He was supposed to take part in Nagroda Iwna, but suffered a minor injury and was withdrawn. He started the Derby as the favourite. Per Anders Graberg rode it. Va Bank won for the sixth time in a row by 4 1/4 lengths with a time of 2'30.90. On August 30, he won his third crown. Won the Nagroda St. Leger again with an advantage of 4 1/4 lengths. The second was the track record holder at 2200 meters Tantal. His last start in 2015 was Nagroda Wielka Warszawska. He was ridden again by Per Anders Graberg. He defeated Tantal again, this time by 6 1/4 lengths in 2'51.20. In the 2015 Icon of Sport plebiscite, he took second place behind Robert Lewandowski.

=== 2016: four-year-old season ===
He started the season with Nagroda Golejewka. He won by a neck in 2'01.60, thus setting a track record. The second was Masterpower. In July he won Nagroda Prezesa Totalizatora Sportowego with a time of 2'44.70. On July 30, he won Nagroda Kozienic with a 4 1/2 length advantage over Newerly. On August 27, he started abroad for the first time. He was enrolled in the Preis der Sparkassen Finanzgruppe G3 at the Baden Baden racetrack in Germany. It was ridden by Martin Siedl. The favorite was Potemkin, the highest ranked horse in the German handicap. Va Bank beat him by 1 1/2 lengths. It was his 12th consecutive victory, which is a Polish record. After the race, Martin Siedl said: "Thank you for the trust and the opportunity to ride. I will gladly accept more offers! He is a great horse, very easy to ride. You give him a signal and he responds. In my sights I had the impression that he still had reserves. I was able to show him the way to victory and he just did it." Soon after, it was announced that Team Valor International had purchased a 50% stake. He took part in Nagroda Wielka Warszawska for the second time. His biggest rival was Caccini, the winner of Derby 2016. Va Bank was ridden by Marek Brezina. Caccini won in style from wire to wire. Va Bank was second 1/2 length behind him. Experts blamed the stallion's failure on too short a period between the victory in Germany and the start in Nagroda Wielka Warszawska, and the tactically bad driving of Marek Brezina. Maciej Janikowski commented: "The course of the competition itself, from my perspective, left much to be desired, but after the race everyone is smart. In my opinion, Va Bank was not the same horse as in previous starts, because if he was, he would have managed, even though the race was not the best for him. Perhaps his body did not have time to fully regenerate after the effort associated with the victorious race in Baden-Baden and the several-hour return journey. When I saw him for the first time after arriving, it struck me that that he clearly "went out of his body". After several days he returned to normal condition and training work, but it is possible that the last three weeks were not enough for him to fully recover mentally and physically".

=== 2017: five-year-old season ===
Va Bank started training with Andreas Wohler in Germany. The stallion finished fourth in the Preis von Dahlwitz Listed before finishing last in the Grosser Preis der Badischen Wirtschaft G2. After the race, Va Bank was diagnosed with microcracks in the articular cartilage.

=== 2018: six-year-old season ===
After recovering, he returned to the track finishing second in the Badener Meile G2 under B. Murzabayev, 1 1/2 lengths behind Stormy Antarctic. In the Grosser Preis Von LOTTO Hamburg G3 under E. Pedroza. he again finished second by a headlong defeat to Devastar. Then he competed in the Grosser Dallmayr Preis - Bayerisches Zuchtrennen G1. E. Pedroza rode it again. He finished third, losing to Benbatl and Stormy Antarctic, and beating Iquitos. In all subsequent starts he was ridden by E. Pedroza. He took part in the Preis der Sparkassen Finanzgruppe G3 for the second time. After the fight, he placed second, a short head behind Wai Key Star. On October 3, he won the Preis der Deutschen by 5 lengths beating Iquitos. In his last race, he had the greatest success of his career. He won the Premio Roma G2 by a head-on defeating Presley.
