= Izzi Top =

British-bred Thoroughbred racehorse

- Racing silks of Helena Springfield Ltd
- Sire: Pivotal
- Grandsire: Polar Falcon
- Dam: Zee Zee Top
- Damsire: Zafonic
- Sex: Mare
- Foaled: 21 April 2008
- Country: United Kingdom
- Colour: Bay
- Breeder: Meon Valley Stud
- Owner: Helena Springfield Ltd
- Trainer: John Gosden
- Record: 12: 6-2-2
- Earnings: £472,668

Major wins
- Prix de Flore (2011); Dahlia Stakes (2012); Middleton Stakes (2012); Pretty Polly Stakes (2012); Prix Jean Romanet (2012)

Izzi Top is a British Thoroughbred racehorse. In a career which lasted from October 2010 until October 2012 she ran twelve times and won six races. As four-year-old in 2012 she won two Group One races- the Pretty Polly Stakes in Ireland and the Prix Jean Romanet in France.

== Background ==
Izzi Top is a bay mare bred by the Meon Valley Stud in Hampshire. Her dam, Zee Zee Top was another product of the Meon Valley Stud who won the Group One Prix de l'Opéra in 2003. Like many horses bred at the stud, she raced in the black and white colours of Helena Springfield Ltd. She was sired by the Nunthorpe Stakes winner Pivotal, who has sired the winners of 24 Group One races including Somnus, Sariska, Farhh, Excellent Art and Immortal Verse.

== Racing career ==
Izzi Top made her debut in a maiden race for two-year-old fillies at Doncaster Racecourse. She started a 33/1 outsider and finished second.

In April 2011 Izzi Top won a maiden race at Windsor Racecourse but was later disqualified when a prohibited substance was detected in a post-race sample. In May she finished third in a ten furlong race at Newmarket and then won a Listed race over the same distance at Newbury Racecourse. In June she started a 25/1 outsider for The Oaks but exceeded expectations by finishing third to Dancing Rain. Izzi Top's only other appearance of the season came more than four months later in the Group Three Prix de Flore at Saint-Cloud Racecourse. She started the 3.1/1 favourite and won by a head from Albaraah.

In May 2012, Izzi Top won the Dahlia Stakes at Newmarket and the Middleton Stakes at York in May. In July she was sent to Ireland to contest the Group One Pretty Polly Stakes at the Curragh. She won her fourth consecutive Group Race comfortably by one and a quarter lengths from the odds-on favourite Sapphire. On 4 August at Goodwood Racecourse, Izzi Top started favourite for the Group One Nassau Stakes but was badly hampered in the final furlong and finished sixth of the eight runners behind her three-year-old stable companion The Fugue. Two weeks after her run at Goodwood, Izzi Top finished second to Snow Fairy in the Prix Jean Romanet at Deauville Racecourse, but was later awarded first place when the winner failed a post-race test. On her final appearance, Izzi Top finished second to Ridasiyna when favourite for the Prix de l'Opéra.

== Breeding career ==
In October 2015, Izzi Top's first foal – a colt by the 2003 Champion Sprinter Oasis Dream – sold for 1,100,000gns at Tattersalls October Yearling Sale. The winning bid was placed by John Ferguson on behalf of Godolphin. Named Dreamfield he won both his starts as a 2yo. He has yet to race as a 3yo.

Her second foal by Dansili – sold for 325,000gns at Tattersalls October Yearling Sale in 2016. Named Willie John he won his debut at Yarmouth on 16 October 2017 for William Haggas.

Her third foal by Dubawi – sold for 2,600,000gns at Tattersalls October Yearling Sale in 2017.

Her fourth foal by Muhaarar is a filly and so will be retained by her breeders.
