= Steven Lamprell =

British businessman (born 1950)

Steven Lamprell (born 1950) is the president, the largest shareholder and founder of Lamprell Plc., a company specializing in the construction and maintenance of Oil and Gasrig.

== Biography ==
He was born in 1950 in Great Britain. He started the company in 1970 after moving to the United Arab Emirates with his family and has gradually built it up to become an influential company, that repairs and maintains offshore oil rigs for companies in the Persian Gulf region, where it has a dominant market position. Lamprell began its first accommodation jackup rig conversion in 1989 and the refurbishment of its first jackup drilling rig in 1992. The company continued to deal with this business activity until the late 1990s. Then it began to diversify into the new construction market for the offshore oil and gas sector. Lamprell successfully took on increasingly complex fabrication projects, including the construction of FPSO process modules and major external FPSO mooring turrets. In 2005 Lamprell completed his Oilfield Engineering Facility at Jebel Ali, with the capacity to undertake five major land rig upgrade and refurbishment projects at any one time. In 2006 Steven sold the majority stake in his company making £265 million. He has not been directly involved in running the company for some time but continues to front the company's connections with the Royal Family in the UAE. Lamprell became a public company and was admitted to the London AIM market on 16 October 2006.

In 2009 Lamprell was 178 on the Sunday Times UK Rich list with an estimated £300 Million. He is now one of the wealthiest ex-pats in the UAE. The fall in oil prices has lowered the value of rig contractor Lamprell Energy, which was nearly £1.2 billion in mid-2008 but is now down to about £193m.

In the 2020 edition of the Sunday Times Rich List, Lamprell's net worth was estimated at £248 million, a decrease of £54 million from the previous year.

Lamprell is a keen polo player and racehorse owner.
