= Prix Jean et Louis Romanet =

- Class: Group 1
- Location: Deauville Racecourse; Deauville, France
- Inaugurated: 2004
- Race type: Flat / Thoroughbred
- Sponsor: Darley
- Website: france-galop.com

Race information
- Distance: 2,000 metres (1¼ miles)
- Surface: Turf
- Track: Right-handed
- Qualification: Four-years-old and up fillies and mares
- Weight: 57 kg
- Purse: €250,000 (2022); 1st: €142,850

Prix Jean et Louis Romanet
2026
Aventure	Diamond Necklace	Timeforshowcasing

Previous years
2025
Quisisana	Survie	Grand Stars
2024
Mqse De Sevigne	American Sonja	Maxux
2023
Mqse De Sevigne	Via Sistina	Above The Curve
2022
Aristia	Rosscarbery	Ebaiyra
2021
Grand Glory	Audarya	Thundering Nights

2020-2011
2020
Audarya	Ambition	Romanciere
2019
Coronet	With You	Red Tea
2018
Nonza	Urban Fox	Navaro Girl
2017
Ajman Princess	Siyoushake	Left Hand
2016
Speedy Boarding	Ame Bleue	Steip Amach
2015
Odeliz	Avenir Certain	We Are
2014
Ribbons	Princess Loulou	Secret Gesture
2013
Romantica	Sarkiyla	Dalkala
2012
Izzi Top	Galikova	Timepiece
2011
Announce	Timepiece	Lily Of The Valley

2010-2004
2010
Stacelita	Antara	Board Meeting
2009
Alpine Rose	Lady Marian	La Boum
2008
Folk Opera	Fair Breeze	Hapsburg
2007
Satwa Queen	Bahia Breeze	Dynaforce
2006
Satwa Queen	Sweet Stream	Red Bloom
2005
Pride	Red Bloom	Whortleberry
2004
Whortleberry	Pride	Chorist

The Prix Jean et Louis Romanet (previously known as "Prix Jean Romanet") is a Group 1 flat horse race in France open to thoroughbred fillies and mares aged four years or older. It is run over a distance of 2,000 metres (about 1¼ miles) at Deauville in August.

== History ==
The event is named in memory of Jean Romanet (1914–2003), a prominent figure in French racing. He devoted much of his life to the Société d'Encouragement, and served as general manager of the organisation from 1961 to 1986.

The Prix Jean Romanet was established in 2004, and it initially held Group 2 status. It was one of several new races designed to keep more fillies from being exported or prematurely retired to stud.

The race was promoted to Group 1 level in 2009.

The race was renamed the Prix Jean et Louis Romanet in memory of Louis Romanet.

== Records ==
Most successful horse (2 wins):

- Satwa Queen – 2006, 2007
- Mqse De Sevigne - 2023, 2024

Leading jockey (3 wins):

- Frankie Dettori – Folk Opera (2008), Ribbons (2014), Coronet (2019)

Leading trainer (4 wins):

- André Fabre – Announce (2011), Romantica (2013), Mqse De Sevigne (2023, 2024)

Leading owner (2 wins):

- Steven & Gillian Lamprell – Satwa Queen (2006, 2007)
- Khalid Abdullah – Announce (2011), Romantica (2013)
- Helena Springfield Ltd – Izzi Top (2012), Speedy Boarding (2016)
- Baron Édouard de Rothschild - Mqse De Sevigne (2023, 2024)

== Winners ==
Year	Winner	Age	Jockey	Trainer	Owner	Time
2004	Whortleberry	4	Thierry Gillet	François Rohaut	Jacques Berès	2:12.90
2005	Pride	5	Christophe Lemaire	Alain de Royer-Dupré	NP Bloodstock Ltd	2:08.80
2006	Satwa Queen	4	Thierry Thulliez	Jean de Roualle	Steven & Gillian Lamprell	2:11.90
2007	Satwa Queen	5	Thierry Thulliez	Jean de Roualle	Steven & Gillian Lamprell	2:11.10
2008	Folk Opera	4	Frankie Dettori	Saeed bin Suroor	Godolphin	2:10.70
2009	Alpine Rose	4	Gérald Mossé	Alain de Royer-Dupré	Ecurie des Monceaux et al.	2:05.50
2010	Stacelita	4	Christophe Soumillon	Jean-Claude Rouget	Martin Schwartz	2:09.30
2011	Announce	4	Maxime Guyon	André Fabre	Khalid Abdullah	2:10.90
2012	Izzi Top ^{[a]}	4	William Buick	John Gosden	Helena Springfield Ltd	2:06.30
2013	Romantica	4	Maxime Guyon	André Fabre	Khalid Abdullah	2:10.72
2014	Ribbons	4	Frankie Dettori	James Fanshawe	Elite Racing Club	2:09.98
2015	Odeliz	5	Adrie de Vries	Karl Burke	Barbara M. Keller	2:14.27
2016	Speedy Boarding	4	Frederik Tylicki	James Fanshawe	Helena Springfield Ltd	2:07:10
2017	Ajman Princess	4	Andrea Atzeni	Roger Varian	Mohammed Obaid Al Maktoum	2:04.13
2018	Nonza	4	Alexis Badel	Henri-Francois Devin	Mme Henri Devin	2:06.46
2019	Coronet	5	Frankie Dettori	John Gosden	Denford Stud	2:09.95
2020	Audarya	4	Ioritz Mendizabal	James Fanshawe	Alison Swinburn	2:08.23
2021	Grand Glory	5	Cristian Demuro	Gianluca Bietolini	Albert Frassetto, John D'Amato & Mike Pietrangelo	2:06.99
2022	Aristia	4	Sean Levey	Richard Hannon Jr.	Mrs Elizabeth Roberts	2:08.03
2023	Mqse De Sevigne	4	Alexis Pouchin	André Fabre	Baron Édouard de Rothschild	2:06.77
2024	Mqse De Sevigne	5	Alexis Pouchin	André Fabre	Baron Édouard de Rothschild	2:08.86
2025	Quisisana	5	Christophe Soumillon	Francis-Henri Graffard	Haras De La Perelle	2:05.73
2026	Aventure	5	Maxime Guyon	Christophe Ferland	Wertheimer et Frère	2:09.06

^{a} Snow Fairy finished first in 2012, but she was later disqualified after testing positive for a banned substance.

== See also ==
- List of French flat horse races
