= Hamriyah =

- Village
- Location in Oman
- Coordinates: 23°35′N 58°33′E
- Country: Oman
- Governorate: Muscat Governorate
- Time zone: UTC+4 (Oman Standard Time)

Hamriyah is a village in Muscat, in northeastern Oman.

This should not be confused with Hamriyah Port, Sharjah or Al Hamriya Port, Dubai.
