= Pride Stakes (Newmarket) =

Flat horse race in Britain

- Class: Group 3
- Location: Rowley Mile; Newmarket, England
- Race type: Flat / Thoroughbred
- Sponsor: Newmarket Pony Academy
- Website: Newmarket

Race information
- Distance: 1m 2f (2,012 metres)
- Surface: Turf
- Track: Straight
- Qualification: Three-years-old and up fillies and mares
- Weight: 9 st 1 lb (3yo); 9 st 5 lb (4yo+); Penalties; 7 lb for Group 1 winners * 5 lb for Group 2 winners * 3 lb for Group 3 winners * * since 31 March
- Purse: £85,000 (2025); 1st: £45,368

Pride Stakes
2026
Song Of The Clouds	Silver Lake	Pacific Mission

Previous years
2025
Karmology	Miss Justice	Ambiente Amigo
2024
Lady Boba	Sound Angela	Higher Leaves
2023
Novus	Veil Of Shadows	Rousay
2022
Creative Flair	Via Sistina	Ville De Grace
2021
Ville De Grace	Lilac Road	Ocean Road

2020-2011
2020
Angel Power	Anna Nerium	Virgin Snow
2019
Fanny Logan	Queen	Simply Beautiful
2018
Scottish Jig	Maid To Remember	Queen of Time
2017
Chain Of Daisies	Permission	Architecture
2016
Laganore	Lady Of Camelot	Pure Art
2015
Chain Of Daisies	Crystal Zvezda	Brandybend
2014
Albasharah	Talmada	Wahgah
2013
Sound Hearts	Cushion	Reyaadah
2012
Polygon	Dorcas Lane	Sound Hearts
2011
Principal Role	Poplin	Bea Remembered

2010-2001
2010
Modeyra	Timepiece	Middle Club
2009
Enticement	Pachattack	Splashdown
2008
Barshiba	Fragrancy	In The Light
2007
Short Skirt	Ronaldsay	Sweet Lilly
2006
Innocent Air	Anna Pavlova	Summer's Eve
2005
Portrayal	Royal Alchemist	Asawer
2004
Sundrop	I Had A Dream	La Sylphide
2003
Al Ihtithar	Tadris	Miss Corniche
2002
Salim Toto	Zee Zee Top	Mythic
2001
Esyoueffcee	Villa Carlotta	Goncharova

2000-1998
2000
Katy Nowaitee	Salee	Zibilene
1999
Khibrah	Horatia	Badaayer
1998
Lady In Waiting	Shfoug	Diamond White

The Pride Stakes is a Group 3 flat horse race in Great Britain open to mares and fillies aged three years or older. It is run at Newmarket over a distance of 1 mile 2 furlongs (2,012 metres), and it is scheduled to take place each year in October.

Prior to 2013 the race was known as the Severals Stakes and was first run in 1998. It was previously contested at Listed level before being upgraded to Group 3 level from the 2019 running. The name Pride Stakes has also been used for a fillies' and mares' race originally run at Ascot as the Princess Royal Stakes. This race was later moved to Newmarket and renamed the Pride Stakes, before returning to Ascot as the British Champions Fillies and Mares Stakes.

== Records ==
Most successful horse (2 wins):

- Chain Of Daisies – 2015, 2017

Leading jockey (6 wins):

- Frankie Dettori – Sundrop (2004), Portrayal (2005), Short Skirt (2007), Modeyra (2010), Scottish Jig (2018), Fanny Logan (2019)

Leading trainer (5 wins):

- Barry Hills – Sundrop (2004), Portrayal (2005), Short Skirt (2007), Modeyra (2010), Albasharah (2014)

== Winners ==
Year	Winner	Age	Jockey	Trainer	Time
1998	Lady In Waiting	3	Richard Quinn	Paul Cole	2:01.94
1999	Khibrah	3	Michael Hills	Ed Dunlop	2:07.10
2000	Katy Nowaitee	4	John Reid	Peter Harris	2:06.02
2001	Esyoueffcee	3	Jimmy Fortune	Mick Easterby	2:07.37
2002	Salim Toto	4	Jimmy Fortune	Hughie Morrison	2:01.89
2003	Al Ihtithar	3	Willie Supple	Barry Hills	2:05.80
2004	Sundrop	3	Frankie Dettori	Saeed bin Suroor	2:07.92
2005	Portrayal	3	Frankie Dettori	Saeed bin Suroor	2:05.72
2006	Innocent Air	3	Martin Dwyer	John Gosden	2:05.48
2007	Short Skirt	4	Frankie Dettori	Saeed bin Suroor	2:07.35
2008	Barshiba	4	Richard Quinn	David Elsworth	2:01.65
2009	Enticement	3	Jimmy Fortune	Sir Michael Stoute	2:03.92
2010	Modeyra	3	Frankie Dettori	Saeed bin Suroor	2:04.19
2011	Principal Role	4	Tom Queally	Sir Henry Cecil	2:03.77
2012	Polygon	4	Michael Hills	John Gosden	2:05.27
2013	Sound Hearts	4	Andrea Atzeni	Roger Varian	2:02.33
2014	Albasharah	5	Frederik Tylicki	Saeed bin Suroor	2:01.62
2015	Chain Of Daisies	3	Dane O'Neill	Henry Candy	2:05.13
2016	Laganore	4	Jim Crowley	Tony Martin	2:04.46
2017	Chain Of Daisies	5	Harry Bentley	Henry Candy	2:02.02
2018	Scottish Jig	3	Frankie Dettori	John Gosden	2:05.36
2019	Fanny Logan	3	Frankie Dettori	John Gosden	2:03.68
2020	Angel Power	3	Silvestre de Sousa	Roger Varian	2:08.56
2021	Ville De Grace	3	Richard Kingscote	Sir Michael Stoute	2:04.49
2022	Creative Flair	4	William Buick	Charlie Appleby	2:02.76
2023	Novus	3	Tom Queally	Gary Moore	2:09.57
2024	Lady Boba	4	Rossa Ryan	Ralph Beckett	2:05.27
2025	Karmology	5	Clifford Lee	Karl Burke	2:02.03
2026	Song Of The Clouds	3	Cieren Fallon	William Haggas	2:03.59

== See also ==
- Horse racing in Great Britain
- List of British flat horse races
