= Kayf Tara =

British-bred Thoroughbred racehorse (1994–2022)

- Sire: Sadler's Wells
- Grandsire: Northern Dancer
- Dam: Colorspin
- Damsire: High Top
- Sex: Stallion
- Foaled: 18 March 1994
- Died: 8 December 2022 (aged 28)
- Country: Great Britain
- Colour: Dark Bay/Brown
- Breeder: Meon Valley Stud
- Owner: Sheikh Ahmed Al Maktoum; Godolphin Stables (1998-)
- Trainer: Michael Stoute; Saeed bin Suroor (1998-)
- Record: 15: 10-1-2
- Earnings: £644,235

Major wins
- Ascot Gold Cup (1998, 2000); Irish St. Leger (1998, 1999); Prix Kergorlay (1999); Goodwood Cup (1999); Prix Vicomtesse Vigier (1999); Yorkshire Cup (2000)

Awards
- European Champion Stayer (1998, 1999, 2000)
- Last updated on 7 September 2007

Kayf Tara (18 March 1994 – 8 December 2022) was a British Thoroughbred racehorse and sire.

== Background ==
Kayf Tara was bred in England by the Meon Valley Stud. His dam Colorspin won the Irish Oaks and had previously produced the multiple Group One winner Opera House. He was owned by Ahmed Al Maktoum before being transferred to the ownership of Godolphin Racing.

Kayf Tara died on 8 December 2022, at the age of 28.

== Racing career ==
Kayf Tara won the Ascot Gold Cup and the Irish St. Leger in 1998. In the following year he won the Prix Kergorlay, Goodwood Cup and Prix Vicomtesse Vigier before taking a second Irish St. Leger. In 2000 he won the Yorkshire Cup and a second Ascot Gold Cup.

The recurrence of an old injury brought Kayf Tara's racing career to an end.

== Honours ==
Kayf Tara won the Cartier European Top Stayer three years in a row from 1998 to 2000.

== Stud record ==
Kayf Tara stood as stud stallion at Overbury Stud in Overbury, Worcestershire. He has had considerable success as a National Hunt stallion. His most successful offspring have included Planet of Sound (Punchestown Gold Cup), Blaklion (RSA Chase), Thistlecrack, Special Tiara, Tea For Two (Feltham Novices' Chase), Ballyandy (Champion Bumper), Identity Thief (Liverpool Hurdle, Fighting Fifth Hurdle) and Carruthers (Hennessy Gold Cup).

== Pedigree ==
Pedigree of Kayf Tara, bay stallion 1994
Sire Sadler's Wells	Northern Dancer	Nearctic	Nearco
Sire Sadler's Wells	Northern Dancer	Nearctic	Lady Angela
Sire Sadler's Wells	Northern Dancer	Natalma	Native Dancer
Sire Sadler's Wells	Northern Dancer	Natalma	Almahmoud
Sire Sadler's Wells	Fairy Bridge	Bold Reason	Hail to Reason
Sire Sadler's Wells	Fairy Bridge	Bold Reason	Lalun
Sire Sadler's Wells	Fairy Bridge	Special	Forli
Sire Sadler's Wells	Fairy Bridge	Special	Thong
Dam Colorspin	High Top	Derring-Do	Darius
Dam Colorspin	High Top	Derring-Do	Sipsey Bridge
Dam Colorspin	High Top	Camenae	Vimy
Dam Colorspin	High Top	Camenae	Madrilene
Dam Colorspin	Reprocolor	Jimmy Reppin	Midsummer Night
Dam Colorspin	Reprocolor	Jimmy Reppin	Sweet Molly
Dam Colorspin	Reprocolor	Blue Queen	Majority Blue
Dam Colorspin	Reprocolor	Blue Queen	Hill Queen (family 13-e)
