= Lake Coniston =

Irish-bred Thoroughbred racehorse

- Sire: Bluebird
- Grandsire: Storm Bird
- Dam: Persian Polly
- Damsire: Persian Bold
- Sex: Stallion
- Foaled: 21 February 1991
- Country: Ireland
- Colour: Bay
- Breeder: J P McManus
- Owner: Highclere Thoroughbred Racing Ltd
- Trainer: Geoff Lewis
- Record: 16: 7-3-0
- Earnings: £225,161

Major wins
- Hackwood Stakes (1994); Prix de Meautry (1994); Diadem Stakes (1994); Abernant Stakes (1995); Duke of York Stakes (1995); July Cup (1995)

Awards
- Timeform rating=131

Lake Coniston (21 February 1991 – 29 May 2014) was an Irish-bred, British-trained Thoroughbred racehorse and sire. After being sold as a yearling for 22,000 guineas he was sent to be trained in England by Geoff Lewis. Unraced as a juvenile, he established himself as a top-class sprinter as a three-year-old with wins in the Hackwood Stakes, Prix de Meautry and Diadem Stakes. He was even better at four, winning the Abernant Stakes, Duke of York Stakes and July Cup. His performance in the last-named race saw him regarded as one of the best British sprinters of modern times. He stood as a breeding stallion in Ireland, England, Australia, New Zealand, Italy and South Africa with limited success. He died in South Africa in 2014 at the age of 23.

== Background ==
Lake Coniston was a bay horse with a small white star bred in Ireland by J. P. McManus. He was sired by Bluebird, a Kentucky-bred, Irish-trained sprinter who won the King's Stand Stakes in 1987. The best of his other progeny included Fly to the Stars, Swallow Flight (Sandown Mile), Dolphin Street (Prix de la Forêt), Twilight Blues (Duke of York Stakes), Bluegrass Prince (Diomed Stakes), Macaw (Elkhorn Stakes), Aube Indienne (Yellow Ribbon Stakes) and Delilah (Park Hill Stakes). Lake Coniston's dam Persian Polly showed some racing ability and was placed at Group Three level as a two-year-old.

As a yearling Lake Coniston was consigned from the Tullamaine Castle Stud to the Tattersalls sales in October and was bought for 22,000 guineas by the bloodstock agent John Warren. During his racing career, the colt raced in the ownership of Highclere Thoroughbred Racing Ltd, a group of syndicates formed in 1992 with Warren as a director. Lake Coniston was sent into training with Geoff Lewis at his Thirty Acre Barn stable near Epsom in Surrey. The colt's name was apparently a reference to Donald Campbell.

== Racing career ==
=== 1994: three-year-old season ===
Lake Coniston was highly regarded by Lewis but did not race as a two-year-old as he underwent surgery to remove a bone spur on his knee. He made his debut in the Wood Ditton Stakes for previously unraced horses at Newmarket Racecourse in April 1994 when he finished fifth of the nineteen runners behind the John Gosden-trained Airport. On 5 May he started 2/1 favourite for a six furlong maiden race at Salisbury Racecourse but was beaten half a length into second by Monaassib. In a maiden at Haydock Park later that month he was tried over seven furlongs and finished sixth of the eight runners. Eleven days after his poor run at Haydock, recorded his first victory in a minor race over six furlongs at Great Yarmouth Racecourse: ridden by Pat Eddery, he led from the start, went clear of his four opponents in the last quarter mile and won by two and half lengths.

On 16 June Lake Coniston was moved up sharply in class for the Cork and Orrery Stakes at Royal Ascot in which he started a 20/1 outsider and finished unplaced behind Owington. He was dropped back to five furlongs for the Listed Sprint Stakes at Sandown Park Racecourse on 2 July and led for most of the way before being caught in the final strides and beaten a short head by the four-year-old Up and At 'Em. Two weeks later, the colt made his seventh appearance of the year in the Hackwood Stakes at Newbury Racecourse and started third favourite behind the Gosden-trained pair Nimphidia and Storm Canyon. Eddery sent the colt into the lead from the start and he won by a length and a half from Nimphidia, with the pair finishing seven lengths clear of the other nine runners. Eleven days after his win at Newbury, the colt was dropped back in distance for the King George Stakes over five furlongs at Goodwood Racecourse and finished fourth, two and a quarter lengths behind the six-year-old mare Lochsong. In August he was sent to France to contest the Group Three Prix de Meautry over 1200 metres at Deauville Racecourse in which he was ridden by Pat Eddery's younger brother Paul Eddery. The betting was headed by the Middle Park Stakes winner First Trump, with Lake Coniston starting a 14.4/1 outsider in an eight-runner field. Lake Coniston disputed the early lead before gaining a clear advantage at half way and won easily by two and a half lengths from First Trump.

On his return to England, Lake Coniston, ridden by Pat Eddery, started favourite ahead of First Trump in the Diadem Stakes over six furlongs at Ascot on 24 September when the other runners included Bin Ajwaad (third in the 2000 Guineas) and Hard To Figure (Ayr Gold Cup). Lake Coniston led from the start and held of the sustained challenge of First Trump to win by a length, with a gap of three and a half lengths back to Thousla Rock in third.

=== 1995: four-year-old season ===
Lake Coniston began his second season in the Listed Abernant Stakes at Newmarket in April. After the Swedish sprinter Windmachine took him on for the lead he established an advantage two furlongs out and won by three and half lengths from the filly Triple Joy. A month later the colt started 8/11 favourite for the Group Three Duke of York Stakes at York Racecourse. His opponents included the Godolphin runner So Factual, Chilly Billy (Gimcrack Stakes) and Raah Algharb (Flying Childers Stakes). He led from the start and won by three lengths from So Factual with the filly Branston Abby a further three and a half lengths back in third.

At Royal Ascot Lake Coniston started odds-on favourite for the Cork and Orrery Stakes in which the field split into two groups on either side of the straight. He led the group on the stands side (the left side from the jockeys' viewpoint) throughout the race but was overtaken in the closing stages and beaten a head by So Factual, who raced up the opposite side of the track. Lake Coniston started 13/8 favourite when he met So Factual for the third time in the July Cup at Newmarket on 13 July. The other seven runners were Owington (attempting to repeat his 1994 success), Sergeyev (Jersey Stakes), Piccolo (Nunthorpe Stakes), Heart Lake (Yasuda Kinen), Fard (Middle Park Stakes), Hoh Magic (Prix Morny) and Millstream (Ballyogan Stakes). Eddery sent the favourite into the lead from the start as usual and the colt was never seriously challenged. Lake Coniston accelerated clear approaching the final furlong and won in "very impressive" style by four lengths from Piccolo. Eddery commented "He's so quick early that he burns them off... from a furlong and a half out he just quickened away from them off a good pace. He's as good a sprinter as I've ever ridden and today he was unbeatable". The official handicapper said "You wouldn't be afraid to put him up against any other sprinter of the last 25 years and that includes Dayjur. That was an exceptional performance".

In September, Lake Coniston started at odds of 1/3 for the Haydock Sprint Cup. After disputing the lead for most of the way he was unable to quicken in the final furlong and finished fourth of the six runners behind Cherokee Rose, Branston Abby and Owington. For his final appearance, Lake Coniston was sent to the United States to contest the Breeders' Cup Sprint on dirt at Belmont Park on 28 October. He reached fourth place on the final turn before fading badly in the straight and finishing eleventh. According to his trainer he failed to cope with the kickback (dirt kicked up from the racing surface): he said "When he returned he was covered in so much muck that I didn't even recognise him. It took a vet more than an hour to get all the stuff out of his eyes".

== Stud record ==
Lake Coniston was retired from racing to become a breeding stallion after being sold for £2.4 million to the Coolmore Stud. He stood at Coolmore's base in Ireland and was also shuttled to Australia and New Zealand for the southern hemisphere breeding season. He moved to the Collin Stud at Newmarket in 2001 and stood for a season in Italy in 2004. Later that year he was exported to South Africa where he was based at the Odessa Stud before moving to Kimberley, Northern Cape where he died on 29 May 2014.

The best of his offspring was Continent who won the Ayr Gold Cup, July Cup and Prix de l'Abbaye and was voted Cartier Champion Sprinter in 2002. His other foals included the Wokingham Stakes winner Capricho.

== Pedigree ==
Pedigree of Lake Coniston (IRE), bay stallion, 1991
| Sire Bluebird (USA) 1984 | Storm Bird (CAN); 1978 | Northern Dancer | Nearctic |
| Sire Bluebird (USA) 1984 | Storm Bird (CAN); 1978 | Northern Dancer | Natalma |
| Sire Bluebird (USA) 1984 | Storm Bird (CAN); 1978 | South Ocean | New Providence |
| Sire Bluebird (USA) 1984 | Storm Bird (CAN); 1978 | South Ocean | Shining Sun |
| Sire Bluebird (USA) 1984 | Ivory Dawn (USA); 1978 | Sir Ivor | Sir Gaylord |
| Sire Bluebird (USA) 1984 | Ivory Dawn (USA); 1978 | Sir Ivor | Attica |
| Sire Bluebird (USA) 1984 | Ivory Dawn (USA); 1978 | Dusky Evening | Tim Tam |
| Sire Bluebird (USA) 1984 | Ivory Dawn (USA); 1978 | Dusky Evening | Home By Dark |
| Dam Persian Polly (IRE) 1980 | Persian Bold (IRE); 1975 | Bold Lad (IRE) | Bold Ruler |
| Dam Persian Polly (IRE) 1980 | Persian Bold (IRE); 1975 | Bold Lad (IRE) | Barn Pride |
| Dam Persian Polly (IRE) 1980 | Persian Bold (IRE); 1975 | Relkarunner | Relko |
| Dam Persian Polly (IRE) 1980 | Persian Bold (IRE); 1975 | Relkarunner | Running Blue |
| Dam Persian Polly (IRE) 1980 | Polyester Girl (IRE); 1974 | Ridan | Nantallah |
| Dam Persian Polly (IRE) 1980 | Polyester Girl (IRE); 1974 | Ridan | Rough Shod |
| Dam Persian Polly (IRE) 1980 | Polyester Girl (IRE); 1974 | Garrucha | Prince Taj |
| Dam Persian Polly (IRE) 1980 | Polyester Girl (IRE); 1974 | Garrucha | Gibellina (Family: 5-d) |
