= Never So Bold =

Irish-bred Thoroughbred racehorse (1980–2000)

- Sire: Bold Lad (IRE)
- Grandsire: Bold Ruler
- Dam: Never Never Land
- Damsire: Habitat
- Sex: Stallion
- Foaled: 26 April 1980
- Country: Ireland
- Colour: Bay
- Breeder: Mount Rosa Stud
- Owner: George Tong Kwo Kiun, Edward Kessly
- Trainer: Robert Armstrong
- Record: 23:10-4-3

Major wins
- Great St. Wilfrid Stakes (1983); Prix de la Porte Maillot (1984); Prix Maurice de Gheest (1984); Diadem Stakes (1984); Temple Stakes (1985); King's Stand Stakes (1985); July Cup (1985); William Hill Sprint Championship (1985)

Awards
- Timeform top-rated older male horse (1985); Timeform champion sprinter (1985); Timeform rating: 135

Never So Bold (26 April 1980 – 8 February 2000) was a British Thoroughbred racehorse and sire. He was a specialist sprinter who recorded all his important wins at distances between five and six and a half furlongs. After finishing unplaced in his only start as a two-year-old he showed good, but unexceptional form in handicaps the following season. In 1984 he improved to become a top-class performer, winning the Prix de la Porte Maillot and the Prix Maurice de Gheest in France and the Diadem Stakes in England. He made further improvement to become recognised as the best sprinter in Europe in 1985, winning the Temple Stakes, King's Stand Stakes, July Cup and William Hill Sprint Championship. After a poor run in the Breeders' Cup Mile he was retired to stud where he had limited success as a sire of winners.

== Background ==
Never So Bold was a "big, rangy, good-looking" bay horse with a small white star bred by the Mount Rosa Stud. During his racing career he carried the red and white colours of Edward Kessly. He was trained at Newmarket, Suffolk by Robert Armstrong, who had trained another outstanding sprinter in Moorestyle, and was ridden by American jockey Steve Cauthen and Lester Piggott.

Never So Bold was sired by Bold Lad, the leading British and Irish two-year-old of 1966, whose other offspring included the 1000 Guineas winner Waterloo. His dam Never Never Land was an unraced sister of Bombazine, who produced the St Leger winner Bruni.

== Racing career ==
=== 1982–1983: early career ===
Never So Bold's only race as a two-year-old came on 29 October at Newmarket Racecourse when he finished eighth of the twenty runners in a maiden race. In the following season he lost his first three races but then developed into what the independent Timeform organisation described as "quite a useful handicapper". He won three races including the Great St. Wilfrid Stakes over six furlongs at Ripon and the Pearce Duff Stakes over seven furlongs at Ascot. He ended the year with a Timeform rating of 100.

=== 1984: four-year-old season ===
On his first two starts as a four-year-old Never So Bold was beaten in a handicap race at Newmarket at was then tried at Listed class in the John of Gaunt Stakes at Haydock Park Racecourse, where he finished second to Mr Meeka. The colt's rise to the top of the sprint division came in June when he won the Prix de la Porte Maillot, a weak-looking Group Three event over 1400 metres at Longchamp Racecourse. In the Group One July Cup at Newmarket he started a 33/1 outsider but exceeded expectations by finishing second to the three-year-old Chief Singer, and ahead of the leading sprinters Committed and Habibti.

In August, Never So Bold made a second visit to France and recorded his most important success up to that time when he won the Prix Maurice de Gheest (then Group Two, now Group One) over 1300 metres at Deauville. Later that month he was beaten a neck by Prego in the Group Three Hungerford Stakes over seven furlongs when he appeared to tire in the closing stages. On his next appearance he was ridden by Tony Murray in the Vernons Sprint Cup at Haydock and finished third, beaten a short head and half a length by Petong and Habibti. On his final appearance he won his first British Group race when he beat Fortysecond Street by 1 1/2 lengths in the Diadem Stakes at Ascot. By the end of the year, he was rated 128 by Timeform, representing an improvement of 28 pounds on his 1983 rating.

It had been intended that the colt would be retired to stud at the end of the year, but when an injury prevented him from taking the required medical checks the decision was taken to keep him in training for one more season.

=== 1985: five-year-old season ===
Never So Bold began his final season in the Temple Stakes at Sandown Park Racecourse in May. Racing over the minimum distance of five furlongs for the first time he took the lead two furlongs from the finish and won by half a length from the three-year-old Primo Dominie. On 21 June Never So Bold started 4/1 second favourite for the Group One King's Stand Stakes over five furlongs at Royal Ascot. Ridden by his trainer's brother-in-law Piggott, Never So Bold took the lead two furlongs from the finish and quickly went clear of his opponents. He won by three lengths despite being eased down by Piggott in the closing stages: according to Timeform he "slaughtered" the opposition. There was some concern after the race when the winner appeared to be lame, the result of a condition which caused internal bleeding in his left foreleg after exercise. The condition recurred after the July Cup at Newmarket, but did not affect Never So Bold in the race, as he accelerated from off the pace to win by 2 1/2 lengths from Committed. At York Racecourse on 22 August, Never So Bold won his third consecutive Group One race as he beat Primo Dominie by two lengths in the William Hill Sprint Championship (now the Nunthorpe Stakes).

In his two remaining races, Never So Bold failed to reproduce his best form. In October he was made odds-on favourite for the Prix de l'Abbaye but did not produce his usual acceleration and finished fourth to Committed. He was then sent to the United States for the Breeders' Cup Mile at Aqueduct Racetrack in November. Racing over the distance for the first time in 2 1/2 years he was never in contention and finished tenth behind Cozzene. He was then retired to stud with a syndicated value of £1.8 million.

== Assessment ==
In 1985 Never So Bold was officially Europe's fourth best older horse, with a rating of 130 placing him behind Sagace, Rainbow Quest and Pebbles. Following a "recalibration" of historic ratings in 2013, the ratings of all horses in the 1985 classification were moved down by three pounds, giving him a new official rating of 127. The independent Timeform organisation disagreed, assigning Never So Bold a rating of 135 (level with the filly Pebbles), making him the highest-rated older male horse of the year as well as their champion sprinter.

In their book A Century of Champions, based on a modified version of the Timeform system, John Randall and Tony Morris rated Never So Bold the twenty-fifth best British or Irish trained sprinter of the 20th century.

== Stud record ==
Never So Bold was initially based at the Brook Stud at Newmarket, later moving to the Cheveley Park Stud and then the Britton House Stud in Somerset before arriving at the Wood Farm Stud in Shropshire in 1995. He was not a successful sire, the best of his offspring being the Diomed Stakes winner Eton Lad and the Wokingham Stakes winner Venture Capitalist. He was, however, the damsire of Presvis, a gelding who earned prize money of more than £4 million, winning races including the Queen Elizabeth II Cup and the Dubai Duty Free Stakes. Never So Bold died of heart failure at Wood Farm on 8 February 2000.

== Pedigree ==
Pedigree of Never So Bold (IRE), bay stallion, 1980
Sire Bold Lad (IRE)	Bold Ruler (USA)	Nasrullah	Nearco
Sire Bold Lad (IRE)	Bold Ruler (USA)	Nasrullah	Mumtaz Begum
Sire Bold Lad (IRE)	Bold Ruler (USA)	Miss Disco	Discovery
Sire Bold Lad (IRE)	Bold Ruler (USA)	Miss Disco	Outdone
Sire Bold Lad (IRE)	Barn Pride (GB)	Democratic	Denturius
Sire Bold Lad (IRE)	Barn Pride (GB)	Democratic	Light Fantasy
Sire Bold Lad (IRE)	Barn Pride (GB)	Fair Alycia	Alycidon
Sire Bold Lad (IRE)	Barn Pride (GB)	Fair Alycia	Fair Edwine
Dam Never Never Land (GB)	Habitat (USA)	Sir Gaylord	Turn-To
Dam Never Never Land (GB)	Habitat (USA)	Sir Gaylord	Somethingroyal
Dam Never Never Land (GB)	Habitat (USA)	Little Hut	Occupy
Dam Never Never Land (GB)	Habitat (USA)	Little Hut	Savage Beauty
Dam Never Never Land (GB)	Whimsical (GB)	Nearula	Nasrullah
Dam Never Never Land (GB)	Whimsical (GB)	Nearula	Respite
Dam Never Never Land (GB)	Whimsical (GB)	Whimbrel	The Phoenix
Dam Never Never Land (GB)	Whimsical (GB)	Whimbrel	Lindus (Family: 22-a)

- Never So Bold was inbred 3 x 4 to Nasrullah, meaning that this stallion appears in both the third and fourth generations of his pedigree.
