= Arch (horse) =

American-bred Thoroughbred racehorse

- Arch's grave at Claiborne Farm
- Sire: Kris S.
- Grandsire: Roberto
- Dam: Aurora
- Damsire: Danzig
- Sex: Stallion
- Foaled: 1995
- Country: USA
- Colour: Brown
- Breeder: Helen Alexander & Helen Groves
- Owner: Claiborne Farm
- Trainer: Frank L. Brothers
- Record: 7: 5-1-0
- Earnings: $480,990

Major wins
- Super Derby (1998); Fayette Breeder’s Cup (1998)
- Last updated on 5/9/12

Arch (January 31, 1995 – January 20, 2016) was a Kentucky-bred race horse and sire. He was a son of Kris S. and Aurora (by Danzig). Arch won the Grade 1 Super Derby and sired many notable stakes winners.

== Race career ==
Arch had a short but productive racing career. On his first outing during his two-year-old season, he broke his maiden by a length and a half.

Frank Brothers brought Arch back as a three-year-old in April to win an allowance race. He was then put on a four-month break to prepare for his stakes debut.

After two more allowance races (in which he came in second and first), he was entered in the Super Derby at Louisiana Downs. Arch broke well and stalked the pace. On the second turn, he made his move and battled down the stretch with eventual Gr.2 millionaire Classic Cat. Arch won by three lengths.

He was then entered the Fayette Breeders' Cup (now the Fayette Stakes) against three opponents. Arch beat Touch Gold (the previous year's Belmont Stakes winner) by a neck in a record time of 1:53.87.

In the 1998 Breeders' Cup Classic at Churchill Downs, Arch placed ninth in a 10-horse field that included Skip Away, Swain, Silver Charm and Victory Gallop. With Shane Sellers aboard, Arch was either second or third in each of the first four splits, but faded down the stretch. After this race, Arch was retired to stand stud.

== Stud career ==
Arch retired to stand at Claiborne Farm. His stud fee steadily rose with the success of his progeny, and he was set to stand for a fee of $40,000 the year he died.

As of 2018, he has sired 59 stakes winners, with 35 of them being graded winners. Twelve are Gr.I winners, and four are champions.

=== Progeny ===
Arch's top progeny includes:

- Blame – Winner of the 2010 Breeders' Cup Classic, Stephen Foster Handicap, Whitney Handicap, etc. 2010 American Champion Older Dirt Male Horse.
- Arravale – Winner of the Del Mar Oaks, E. P. Taylor Stakes, Natalma Stakes, etc. 2006 Canadian Horse of the Year and Champion Turf Female.
- Les Arcs – Winner of the Golden Jubilee Stakes, July Cup. 2006 Maryland Horse of the Year.
- Overarching – Winner of the Horse Chestnut Stakes (SAF-G1). 2005 South Africa Horse of the Year.
- Pine Island – Winner of the Alabama Stakes, Gazelle Stakes.
- Newsdad – Winner of the Pan American Stakes (twice), Fayette Stakes.
- Hymn Book – Winner of the Donn Handicap.
- It Tiz Well – Winner of the Cotillion Stakes, Honeybee Stakes, Delaware Oaks.
- Grand Arch – Winner of the Shadwell Turf Mile, King Edward Stakes.
- Love Theway Youare – Winner of the Vanity Handicap.
- Archarcharch – Winner of the Arkansas Derby and Southwest Stakes.
- Nyaleti – Winner of the German 1,000 Guineas.
- Preservationist – Winner of the 2019 Woodward Stakes

Arch is also the sire of graded stakes winners Instilled Regard, Tax, Arklow, Nonna Mela, Art Trader, and others.

Arch is the broodmare sire of:

- Uncle Mo: The 2010 American Champion Two-Year-Old Male and successful sire, who has sired:
  - Nyquist – 2016 Kentucky Derby winner and 2015 American Champion Two-year-Old Male.
  - Unbridled Mo – Apple Blossom Handicap.
  - Mo Town – Hollywood Derby.
  - Outwork – Wood Memorial Stakes.
  - Dream Tree – Starlet Stakes.
  - Mo Dont No – 2016 Ohio Horse of the Year, Champion Three-Year-Old Male.
- I'll Have Another: Winner of the 2012 Kentucky Derby, Preakness Stakes, etc. 2012 American Champion Three-Year-Old Male and sire of:
  - Another Truth (JPN) – Multiple stakes winner in Japan.
  - Win Gerbera (JPN) – Graded stakes-placed in Japan.
- Uncaptured: 2012 Canadian Horse of the Year and Champion Two-Year-Old Male who has sired:
  - Catherinethegreat – Schuylerville Stakes.
- Helene Super Star (Lines of Battle): Hong Kong Champions & Chater Cup, UAE Derby.

=== Sire line ===
Arch is an emerging sire of sires. He has numerous sons standing at stud, with several of them siring graded winners of their own.

Blame is the sire of:

- Senga – Prix de Diane, Prix de la Grotte.
- Marley's Freedom – Ballerina Stakes, Great Lady M. Stakes.
- March – Woody Stephens Stakes.
- Fault – Santa Margarita Stakes, Buena Vista Stakes.
- Maraud – American Turf Stakes.

Archarcharch is the sire of:

- Next Shares – Shadwell Turf Mile Stakes, San Gabriel Stakes.
- Mr. Misunderstood – Wise Dan Stakes, Commonwealth Turf Cup, River City Handicap.
- Toews On Ice – Bob Hope Stakes.

== Death ==
Arch died on January 20, 2016, of an apparent heart attack at Claiborne Farm, where the 21-year-old stood at stud.
