= Owington =

British-bred Thoroughbred racehorse

- Racing silks of Baron Georg Von Ullmann
- Sire: Green Desert
- Grandsire: Danzig
- Dam: Old Domesday Book
- Damsire: High Top
- Sex: Stallion
- Foaled: 6 February 1991
- Country: United Kingdom
- Colour: Bay
- Breeder: Stanley Estate and Stud Co
- Owner: Baron Georg Von Ullmann
- Trainer: Geoff Wragg
- Record: 15: 5-1-5
- Earnings: £268,477

Major wins
- Moët & Chandon Rennen (1993); Duke of York Stakes (1994); Cork and Orrery Stakes (1994); July Cup (1994)

Awards
- Top-rated two-year-old in Germany (1993); Top-rated three-year-old sprinter in Britain (1994)

Owington (6 February 1991 – 12 August 1996) was a British Thoroughbred racehorse and sire. He showed very good form as a juvenile, winning the Moët & Chandon Rennen in Germany and finishing a close second in the Middle Park Stakes. In the following season he was one of the leading sprinters in Europe, recording victories in the Duke of York Stakes, Cork and Orrery Stakes and July Cup. He remained in training in 1995 and ran well without winning. He was retired to stud in 1996 but died later that year.

== Background ==
Owington was a bay horse with no white markings bred by the 18th Earl of Derby's Stanley Estate. He was sired by Green Desert who finished second to Dancing Brave in the 2000 Guineas and won the July Cup in 1986. He sired the winners of over 1,000 races, including Oasis Dream, Desert Prince, Sheikh Albadou and Cape Cross. Owington's dam, Old Domesday Book won one race at Chester Racecourse from eight starts and was rated 93 by Timeform in 1986. She was a great-granddaughter of Samanda, an influential broodmare whose descendants have included Ouija Board, Teleprompter and Ibn Bey.

Owington was acquired by the German financier Baron Georg Von Ullmann and sent into training with Geoff Wragg at his Abington Place stable in Newmarket, Suffolk. Like many of Wragg's horses, he usually raced in a sheepskin noseband.

== Racing career ==
=== 1993: two-year-old season ===
Owington began his racing career by finishing third in a six furlong maiden race at Newmarket Racecourse on 31 July 1993. Nineteen days later he started 5/4 favourite for the Convivial Maiden Stakes at York Racecourse and recorded his first victory, accelerating away from his opponents in the closing stages to win in "impressive" style by three and a half lengths from Pinkerton's Pal. The colt was then sent to Germany and moved up in class for the Group Two Moët & Chandon Rennen at Baden-Baden on 3 September. Ridden as in his two previous races by Michael Hills he prevailed by a short head from his fellow British challenger Fumo di Londra. Pat Eddery took over from Hills when Owingtom contested the Group One Middle Park Stakes at Newmarket and started second favourite behind Turtle Island (Phoenix Stakes, Gimcrack Stakes). Owington took the lead approaching the last quarter mile but was caught in the final strides and beaten a head by his stablemate First Trump.

=== 1994: three-year-old season ===
On his first appearance as a three-year-old, Owington ran in the Greenham Stakes (a trial race for the 2000 Guineas) over seven furlongs on soft ground at Newbury Racecourse. He took the lead three furlongs out but faded in the closing stages and finished fifth of the eight runners behind Turtle Island. On 12 May, the colt reverted to sprint distances and was matched against older horses in the Duke of York Stakes at York and started 4/1 third favourite behind Tropical (Phoenix Sprint Stakes) and Marina Park (Princess Margaret Stakes). The colt was always among the leaders, went to the front a furlong out, and won "comfortably" by three lengths from Bid For Blue.

In June Owington was sent to Royal Ascot and was made favourite for the Cork and Orrery Stakes (then a Group Three race). His sixteen opponents included Catrail (Challenge Stakes), Redoubtable (National Stakes), So Factual (European Free Handicap), College Chapel (winner of the race in 1993), Keen Hunter, Piccolo and Lake Coniston. The favourite was restrained by Hills in the early stages before making progress and taking the lead approaching the final furlong. He held off the challenge of So Factual by half a length, with two lengths back to Catrail in third. On 7 July Owington was partnered by Paul Eddery when he started 3/1 second favourite behind the six-year-old mare Lochsong in the July Cup. Catrail, Piccolo and Redoubtable were again in opposition with the four other runners being Barathea, Dolphin Street (Prix de la Forêt), Lavinia Fontana (Prix du Petit Couvert) and Splice (Abernant Stakes). After tracking the leaders, Owington began to make progress in the last quarter mile and overtook the leader Barathea inside the final furlong. He held off a strong late challenge from Dolphin Street to win by a head with Catrail taking third just ahead of Barathea. Cash Asmussen, who rode the runner-up said "I got there to do him, but the bastard [Owington] was just idling and he pulled out a bit more".

Owington was sent to France in August for the Prix Maurice de Gheest over 1300 metres at Deauville Racecourse. He started second favourite but finished fifth behind Dolphin Street, Catrail, Lavinia Fontana and Unblest, beaten less than two lengths by the winner. In the Haydock Sprint Cup on 3 September, he started 15/8 favourite but appeared outpaced in the closing stages and finished third behind Lavinia Fontana and Piccolo.

=== 1995: four-year-old season ===
Owington remained in training as a four-year-old in 1995. He failed to win in five races but ran consistently against top-class opposition. In the spring he finished third to the three-year-old Mind Games in both the Palace House Stakes and the Temple Stakes carrying weights of 132 pounds and 136 pounds respectively. In July he attempted to repeat his 1994 success in the July Cup and finished fourth behind Lake Coniston, Piccolo and Hoh Magic. At Haydock Park in September he finished third to the French-trained Cherokee Rose in the Sprint Cup, ahead of Lake Coniston, Mind Games and Lavinia Fontana. On his final appearance he was sent to the United States to contest the Breeders' Cup Sprint at Belmont Park on 28 October. Ridden by Frankie Dettori he finished seventh behind Desert Stormer, ahead of the other British challengers Hever Golf Rose and Lake Coniston.

== Stud record ==
Owington was retired from racing to become a breeding stallion in 1996 but died on 12 August 1996 after one season at stud. The best of his only crop of foals were Gateman who won eleven races including the Diomed Stakes and the Earl of Sefton Stakes and Jemima who won the Lowther Stakes. The Racing Post observed that the stallion's early demise "could have robbed the breeding industry of a fine stallion".

== Pedigree ==
Pedigree of Owington (GB), bay stallion, 1991
Sire Green Desert (USA) 1983	Danzig (USA); 1977	Northern Dancer	Nearctic
Sire Green Desert (USA) 1983	Danzig (USA); 1977	Northern Dancer	Natalma
Sire Green Desert (USA) 1983	Danzig (USA); 1977	Pas de Nom	Admiral's Voyage
Sire Green Desert (USA) 1983	Danzig (USA); 1977	Pas de Nom	Petitioner
Sire Green Desert (USA) 1983	Foreign Courier (USA); 1979	Sir Ivor	Sir Gaylord
Sire Green Desert (USA) 1983	Foreign Courier (USA); 1979	Sir Ivor	Attica
Sire Green Desert (USA) 1983	Foreign Courier (USA); 1979	Courtly Dee	Never Bend
Sire Green Desert (USA) 1983	Foreign Courier (USA); 1979	Courtly Dee	Tulle
Dam Old Domesday Book (GB) 1983	High Top (IRE); 1969	Derring-Do	Darius
Dam Old Domesday Book (GB) 1983	High Top (IRE); 1969	Derring-Do	Sipsey Bridge
Dam Old Domesday Book (GB) 1983	High Top (IRE); 1969	Camenae	Vimy
Dam Old Domesday Book (GB) 1983	High Top (IRE); 1969	Camenae	Madrilene
Dam Old Domesday Book (GB) 1983	Broken Record (GB); 1973	Busted	Crepello
Dam Old Domesday Book (GB) 1983	Broken Record (GB); 1973	Busted	Sans Le Sou
Dam Old Domesday Book (GB) 1983	Broken Record (GB); 1973	Sam's Song	Narrator
Dam Old Domesday Book (GB) 1983	Broken Record (GB); 1973	Sam's Song	Samanda (Family: 12-b)
