= Mr Brooks (horse) =

British-bred Thoroughbred racehorse

- Sire: Blazing Saddles
- Grandsire: Todman
- Dam: Double Finesse
- Damsire: Double Jump
- Sex: Colt
- Foaled: 1987
- Country: United Kingdom
- Colour: Bay
- Breeder: Mrs J R Rossdale
- Owner: Kevin Connolly; Paul Green
- Trainer: Kevin Connolly; Jim Bolger; Richard Hannon, Sr.
- Record: 22: 8-9-1
- Earnings: £423,435

Major wins
- Gladness Stakes (1991); Ballyogan Stakes (1991); Concorde Stakes (1991); July Cup (1992); Grosser Preis von Berlin^{1} (1992); Prix de l'Abbaye de Longchamp (1992)

Awards
- European Champion Sprinter (1992); European Champion Older Horse (1992)
- Last updated on 27 December 2006

Mr Brooks (7 April 1987 – 31 October 1992) was a Thoroughbred racehorse who was bred in the United Kingdom and trained in both Ireland and England in a career that lasted from 1989 to 1992. A specialist sprinter, he was posthumously awarded the titles of European Champion Sprinter and European Champion Older Horse at the Cartier Racing Awards.

== Background ==
Mr Brooks was bred in the United Kingdom by Mrs J R Rossdale. He was by some way the best son of his sire, the Australian-bred Blazing Saddles, and the only racehorse of any consequence produced by his dam Double Finesse. His only notable relative was the Champion Two-Year-Old First Trump, a son of his half-sister Valika. He was named after Mel Brooks, who wrote and directed the film Blazing Saddles after which Mr Brooks' sire was named. He was first trained in Ireland by his original owner Kevin Connolly, and then by Jim Bolger, for whose stable he won several important Irish sprint races. His greatest success came after he was transferred to the Wiltshire stable of Richard Hannon Sr. in early 1992.

== Racing career ==
=== 1989–1990: early career ===
Mr Brooks won his only start as a two-year-old, taking a maiden race at Leopardstown by six lengths.

As a three-year-old he was campaigned at the highest level, over distances ranging from five furlongs to one and a half miles. He failed to win in five starts, including the 2,000 Guineas in which he finished fifth, and the Derby in which he came last of the eighteen starters behind Quest For Fame.

=== 1991: four-year-old season ===
From the age of four, Mr Brooks was aimed at sprint distances, and proved more successful, finishing either first or second in fourteen of his remaining sixteen races. In 1991, racing exclusively in Ireland, he won three Group races, starting with a win over the English filly Aldbourne in the Group III Gladness Stakes in April. In June he won the Group III Ballyogan Stakes at Leopardstown and the Group III Concorde Stakes at Tipperary. In all his races in 1990 and 1991, he was ridden by Pat Shanahan.

=== 1992: five-year-old season ===
His championship year of 1992 began with a win in a Listed race at Tipperary, before he was sent to pursue his career in England where Lester Piggott became his new regular jockey. He established himself among the British sprinters with a second place behind Shalfoed in the Duke of York Stakes and was then sent to Royal Ascot for the King's Stand Stakes (then a Group Two race). The race proved highly competitive, with seven horse finishing within one and a half lengths, but Mr Brooks ran on strongly under pressure to take second place behind the Breeders' Cup Sprint winner and reigning Champion Sprinter Sheikh Albadou.

He was then sent for the Group One July Cup at Newmarket, which was expected to be dominated by Shalford and Sheikh Albadou. Starting at 16-1 he was held up in the early stages before being moved up to contest the lead close home and win by a head from Pursuit of Love, with Sheikh Albadou a neck away in third. Although he had appeared to be struggling at one stage, Piggott explained that he had always been confident."He was hanging a bit on the ground... but I was always on their heels and knew he would pick up when I asked." It was Piggott's tenth win in the race, achieved at the age of 56.

For his next start, Mr Brooks traveled to Germany to win the Grosser Preis von Berlin^{1} at Hoppegarten from the French colt Monde Bleu. Returning to England, he finished second to his stablemate, the European Champion Two-Year-Old Filly Lyric Fantasy in the Nunthorpe Stakes, again beating Sheikh Albadou and Shalford. By this time he was regarded as one of Europe's "top sprinters", particularly over six furlongs and a bid for the Breeders' Cup was being considered. On his next start he was matched with Sheikh Albadou for the fourth time in five races in the Haydock Sprint Cup and this time finished second to his rival, beaten by two and a half lengths. Sent to Paris for the Prix de l'Abbaye de Longchamp, he returned to his very best form, taking the lead two furlongs out and pulling away to beat Keen Hunter "easily".

His next start proved to be his final one. Sent to Gulfstream Park for the Breeders' Cup Sprint, he was expected to do well by his trainer, especially after receiving a good draw, and confidence was generally high for the British sprinters after the win of Sheikh Albadou in 1991 and the narrow defeat of Dayjur a year earlier. On the day, Piggott was unhappy with Mr Brooks, who moved poorly in the warm-up, and was reluctant to enter the starting-stalls. In the race itself, Mr Brooks, who was always struggling on the unfamiliar dirt surface, fractured his right foreleg on the approach to the final turn. Piggott reported that his horse tried to keep galloping for several strides before falling heavily. Mr Brooks suffered severe injuries and had to be euthanized by injection on the track. Piggott was knocked unconscious and trapped under the fallen horse, suffering several broken bones and a collapsed lung which forced him to miss the next three months.

Partly as a result of Mr Brooks's fatal accident, the Breeders' Cup organisers introduced a more stringent regime of checks to ensure the safety and welfare of horses in subsequent events.

== Assessment ==
In January 1993 he was named European Champion Sprinter and European Champion Older Horse at the Cartier Racing Awards.

At the time of his death he was officially rated 122 by the British handicapper.

== Pedigree ==
Pedigree of Mr Brooks (GB), dark bay or brown horse, 1987
Sire Blazing Saddles (AUS) 1974	Todman; 1954	Star Kingdom	Stardust
Sire Blazing Saddles (AUS) 1974	Todman; 1954	Star Kingdom	Impromptu
Sire Blazing Saddles (AUS) 1974	Todman; 1954	Oceana	Colombo
Sire Blazing Saddles (AUS) 1974	Todman; 1954	Oceana	Orama
Sire Blazing Saddles (AUS) 1974	Lady Simone; 1969	Wilkes	Court Martial
Sire Blazing Saddles (AUS) 1974	Lady Simone; 1969	Wilkes	San Tares
Sire Blazing Saddles (AUS) 1974	Lady Simone; 1969	Day Tripper	Bourbon Prince
Sire Blazing Saddles (AUS) 1974	Lady Simone; 1969	Day Tripper	Sway
Dam Double Finesse (IRE) 1975	Double Jump; 1962	Rustam	Persian Gulf*
Dam Double Finesse (IRE) 1975	Double Jump; 1962	Rustam	Samovar
Dam Double Finesse (IRE) 1975	Double Jump; 1962	Fair Bid	My Babu
Dam Double Finesse (IRE) 1975	Double Jump; 1962	Fair Bid	Market Fair
Dam Double Finesse (IRE) 1975	Horus Blue; 1970	Golden Horus	Tudor Melody
Dam Double Finesse (IRE) 1975	Horus Blue; 1970	Golden Horus	Persian Union*
Dam Double Finesse (IRE) 1975	Horus Blue; 1970	Real Blue	Borealis
Dam Double Finesse (IRE) 1975	Horus Blue; 1970	Real Blue	Blue Mark (Family: 8-k)

* Mr Brooks is inbred 4D x 5D to the stallion Persian Gulf, meaning that he appears fourth generation and fifth generation (via Persian Union) on the dam side of his pedigree.

== Note ==
^{1} Grosser Preis von Berlin. This was a Group III race over 1300m which was run under various names before being discontinued in 2006, not to be confused with the Group I Deutschland-Preis, which was formerly known as the Grosser Preis von Berlin.
