= Committed (horse) =

American-bred, Irish-trained racehorse

- Sire: Hagley
- Grandsire: Olden Times
- Dam: Minstinguette
- Damsire: Boldnesian
- Sex: Mare
- Foaled: 26 February 1980
- Country: United States
- Colour: Bay
- Breeder: Hickory Tree Farm
- Owner: Robert Sangster; Allen Paulson
- Trainer: Dermot Weld; Ron McAnally
- Record: 30: 17-4-3

Major wins
- Cork and Orrery Stakes (1984); Nunthorpe Stakes (1984); Prix de l'Abbaye (1984, 1985); Ballyogan Stakes (1985); Flying Five Stakes (1985)

Awards
- Top-rated older sprinter in Europe (1984); Gilbey Racing Champion Sprinter (1984); Timeform rating: 97 (1982), 116 (1983), 128 (1984), 126 (1985)
- Last updated on 28 July 2022

Committed (26 February 1980 – 3 May 2009) was an American-bred, Irish-trained Thoroughbred racehorse and broodmare. A specialist sprinter, she competed in four countries and won seventeen of her thirty races between 1982 and 1986. She showed promise as a two-year-old in 1982 and won six consecutive races in the following season, when she was campaigned exclusively in Ireland. As a four-year-old, she emerged as one of the leading sprinters in Europe, winning the Cork and Orrery Stakes and Nunthorpe Stakes in England and the Prix de l'Abbaye in France. In the following year she won the Ballyogan Stakes and Flying Five Stakes before becoming the third horse to win the Prix de l'Abbaye for a second time. She was retired from racing to become a broodmare in the United States and had considerable success as a dam of winners. She died in 2009 at the age of twenty-nine.

== Background ==
Committed was a powerfully built bay mare with a white star and white socks on her hind legs bred by the Hickory Tree Farm in Virginia. She was sired by Hagley, a top-class racehorse who won the Withers Stakes in 1970 but whose record has a breeding stallion had been relatively mediocre. Her dam Minstinguette produced several minor winners and was a granddaughter of Leading Home, a half-sister of the Belmont Stakes winner Bounding Home.

Committed was sent to the sales as a yearling but attracted little interest and was sold for $52,000 to representatives of the British businessman Robert Sangster. The filly was sent to Ireland and was trained by Dermot Weld at the Curragh, County Kildare.

== Racing career ==
=== 1982 & 1983 seasons: early career ===
In 1982, Committed finished unplaced on her debut, and then recorded her first win in a seven furlong maiden race at Galway Racecourse in July. She won a minor event at Leopardstown Racecourse in August and was then moved up sharply in class for the Group One Moyglare Stud Stakes at the Curragh in the following month. Starting a 20/1 outsider for the six furlong race she finished third behind the British-trained Habibti.

Committed improved throughout her three-year-old season in 1983. After being beaten in her first two races she won minor races at Phoenix Park Racecourse and Dundalk Racecourse and then took the July Scurry Handicap at the Curragh. She then returned to Phoenix Park for three weight-for-age wins of increasing importance. She won the Hardwicke Cup over seven furlongs, the Orchardstown Stud Stakes over six and ended her season by winning the Swordlestown Stud Stakes over six in October.

=== 1984: four-year-old season ===
On her four-year-old debut in May, Committed finished second to the British-trained three-year-old Reesh in the Group Three Greenlands Stakes at the Curragh, beaten half a length after making up a great deal of ground in the final furlong. She was then tried over a mile and finished second by half a length to the Vincent O'Brien-trained Argosy in the Kilfrush/What a Guest Stakes at Phoenix Park.

In June Committed was raced outside Ireland for the first time when she was sent to Royal Ascot to contest the Cork and Orrery Stakes in which she was ridden by the Australian Brent Thomson and started the 3/1 favourite against fourteen opponents. She took the lead two furlongs from the finish and won by two and a half lengths from Celestial Dancer, with the Duke of York Stakes winner Gabitat, four lengths back in third. Committed was then moved up to Group One class for the first time since 1982 when she faced an exceptional field which included Habibti (the champion sprinter of 1983), Never So Bold (the champion sprinter of 1985) and Chief Singer in the July Cup at Newmarket Racecourse. She disputed the lead until the final furlong and eventually finished third of the nine runners behind Chief Singer and Never So Bold. The filly then returned to Ireland and won a second Hardwicke Cup, this time as odds-on favourite. In August, Committed ran over the minimum distance of five furlongs for the first time in her career when he ran in the Group One William Hill Sprint Championship at York Racecourse. Ridden again by Thomson, she started at 5/1 against a field which included Habibti, Reesh, Anita' Prince (King George Stakes) and Sayf El Arab (King's Stand Stakes). Committed took the lead approaching the final furlong and drew away from her opponents to win by four lengths in what Timeform described as "a devastating performance".

In September, Committed moved back up to six furlongs for the Vernons Sprint Cup at Haydock Park Racecourse. She had little luck in the race, failing to obtain a clear run until the closing stages and finishing fourth behind Petong, Never So Bold and Habibti. Committed's last race of 1984 was the Group One Prix de l'Abbaye over 1000 metres at Longchamp Racecourse in October in which she was ridden by the American jockey Steve Cauthen. Committed took the lead at half way, accelerated clear of the field, and won by two and a half lengths from Habibti and Anita's Prince. Plans to run her on dirt in the Breeders' Cup Sprint did not materialise and she was retired for the season.

=== 1985: five-year-old season ===
Committed did not appear as a five-year-old until June, when she won the Group Three Ballyogan Stakes over five furlongs at Leopardstown. Two weeks later she started 7/4 favourite for the King's Stand Stakes but finished third behind Never So Bold and Primo Dominie. Following this race she was purchased from Robert Sangster in a private deal by the American businessman Allen Paulson. She was beaten again by Never So Bold in her next race, finishing second to the British five-year-old in the July Cup. At Deauville Racecourse in August she sustained a third consecutive defeat when caught in the last strides and beaten a neck by Spectacular Joke in the Prix Maurice de Gheest over 1300m. The mare returned to winning form in the Swordlestown Stud Stakes at the Phoenix Park but raced lazily and was unimpressive in beating three moderate opponents. In her remaining races she was equipped with a visor.

Rather than travel to England for the Sprint Cup (won by Sangster's colt Orojoya), Committed remained in Ireland and was an easy winner of the inaugural running of the Flying Five Stakes at Phoenix Park. In October the mare was ridden by Mick Kinane as she attempted to win a second Prix de l'Abbaye. Never So Bold was made the 2/5 favourite in a field of twelve, with Committed second in the betting on 8.4/1. Racing on fast ground, Committed took the lead 200m from the finish and held off several challenges to win by a head from Robert Sangter's French-trained filly Vilikaia, with Never So Bold in fourth. She was the third horse to win the race for a second time after Texanita (1963, 1964) and Gentilhombre (1976 (dead heat), 1977). The Abbaye was Committed's last race in Europe: in November she was sent to the United States for the second running of the Breeders' Cup Sprint on dirt at Aqueduct Racetrack. Ridden by Steve Cauthen, she reached fourth place in the straight, but faded in the closing stages and finished seventh behind Precisionist. She was then sent to California and entered the stable of Ron McAnally. She recorded her first North American win in December when she won the Matching Handicap over six furlongs on turf at Hollywood Park Racetrack.

On 15 January 1986, Committed ran for the last time in the Santa Monica Handicap over seven furlongs at Santa Anita Park. She finished eighth behind Her Royalty and was immediately retired to stud.

== Assessment ==
In 1982, Committed was given a rating of 97 by the independent Timeform organisation, while in the Irish Free Handicap (a rating of the best two-year-olds to race in Ireland) she was allotted 111 pounds, 21 pound below the top-rated Danzatore. In the following year, she was rated 116 by Timeform, but did not feature in the official International Classification. Committed was given a peak Timeform rating of 128 in 1984. She was the highest-rated older sprinter in the International Classification and the third highest-rated older female racehorse in Europe, behind Cormorant Wood and Time Charter. In the Gilbey Champion Racehorses awards, based on points awarded for performances in major races, Committed was named Champion Sprinter of 1984. In the International Classification for 1985, Committed was rated the second-best sprinter in Europe behind Never So Bold. Timeform gave her a rating of 126, and commented that despite her unfashionable pedigree "in performance, Committed is an aristocrat".

== Stud record ==
Committed was retired from racing to become a broodmare for her owner's breeding organisation. She was very successful producer: her first seven foals were all winners, two of them at Graded level in the United States. Following Paulson's death in 2000, Committed was sent to the sales at Keeneland and was bought for $300,000 by the Kentucky-based Diamond A Farm.

- Committed Dancer (bay colt, foaled in 1987, sired by Nijinsky) won six races in Ireland
- Dobie (bay colt, foaled in 1988, sired by Lyphard) won three races in Ireland
- Young Freeman (bay colt, foaled in 1989, sired by Nijinsky) won four races in the United Kingdom
- Viage (bay colt, foaled in 1990, sired by Alydar) won two races in the United States
- Pharma (bay mare, foaled in 1991, sired by Theatrical) won seven races in the United States including the Santa Ana Handicap and the Wilshire Handicap
- Nicklaus (bay colt, foaled in 1992, sired by Theatrical) won two races in the United States
- Hap (bay colt, foaled in 1996, sired by Theatrical) won ten races in the United States including the Bernard Baruch Handicap (twice), Shadwell Turf Mile Stakes, Fourstardave Handicap, Dixie Stakes
- Olivia M (bay mare, foaled in 1997, sired by Theatrical) unraced
- Belva (bay mare, foaled in 1998, sired by Theatrical) unraced, dam of English Channel
- Committed Actress (bay mare, foaled in 2001, sired by Theatrical) failed to win in two starts

Committed was euthanised at the Diamond A on 3 May 2009 "due to the infirmities of old age".

== Pedigree ==
Pedigree of Committed (USA), bay mare, 1980
Sire Hagley (USA) 1967	Olden Times (USA); 1958	Relic	War Relic
Sire Hagley (USA) 1967	Olden Times (USA); 1958	Relic	Bridal Colors
Sire Hagley (USA) 1967	Olden Times (USA); 1958	Djenn	Djebel
Sire Hagley (USA) 1967	Olden Times (USA); 1958	Djenn	Teza
Sire Hagley (USA) 1967	Teo Pepi (USA); 1961	Jet Action	Jet Pilot
Sire Hagley (USA) 1967	Teo Pepi (USA); 1961	Jet Action	Busher
Sire Hagley (USA) 1967	Teo Pepi (USA); 1961	Sherry L	Occupation
Sire Hagley (USA) 1967	Teo Pepi (USA); 1961	Sherry L	Unmask
Dam Minstinguette (USA) 1975	Boldnesian (USA); 1963	Bold Ruler	Nasrullah
Dam Minstinguette (USA) 1975	Boldnesian (USA); 1963	Bold Ruler	Miss Disco
Dam Minstinguette (USA) 1975	Boldnesian (USA); 1963	Alanesian	Polynesian
Dam Minstinguette (USA) 1975	Boldnesian (USA); 1963	Alanesian	Anablue
Dam Minstinguette (USA) 1975	Royal Warrant (USA); 1955	Hill Prince	Princequillo
Dam Minstinguette (USA) 1975	Royal Warrant (USA); 1955	Hill Prince	Hildene
Dam Minstinguette (USA) 1975	Royal Warrant (USA); 1955	Leading Home	Bull Lea
Dam Minstinguette (USA) 1975	Royal Warrant (USA); 1955	Leading Home	Marching Home (Family:1-k)
