= Neil Adam (racehorse trainer) =

British racehorse trainer (1932–2003)

Neil Marshall Adam (1932 – 2003) was a British racehorse trainer. He started training with a string of 14 horses at Racecourse Farm, Bescaby, near Melton Mowbray in 1975. In 1976, his horses won two races at Royal Ascot - Cawston Clown won the Coventry Stakes and Gentilhombre won the Cork and Orrery Stakes. The latter won the Prix de l'Abbaye for two consecutive years in 1976 and 1977, as well as the 1977 July Cup and Diadem Stakes. Adam also win the 1977 Nunthorpe Stakes with Haveroid. In that year, he won 27 races worth £64,894 with a string of 61 horses.

He died in 2003 from multiple sclerosis, leaving a £1.2 million stud farm, the 77 acre Collin Stud, near Newmarket, Suffolk. After a court battle, this was inherited by his daughters Grace and Emma. It was ruled that a will he made when paralysed, leaving the stud to Robin Sharp, manager, and Malcolm Bryson, head groom, was invalid.

== Bibliography ==
Mortimer, Roger; Onslow, Richard; Willett, Peter (1978). Biographical Encyclopedia of British Flat Racing. Macdonald and Jane's. ISBN 0-354-08536-0.
