= It Tiz Well =

American thoroughbred racehorse

- Sire: Arch
- Grandsire: Kris S
- Dam: It Tiz
- Damsire: Tiznow
- Sex: Mare
- Foaled: April 30th, 2014
- Country: USA
- Breeder: Allen Branch & Susan Branch
- Owner: Tommy Town Thoroughbreds LLC
- Trainer: Jerry Hollendorfer
- Jockey: Drayden Van Dyke
- Record: 10:5-2-2
- Earnings: $1,130,840

Major wins
- Cotillion Handicap (2017)

It Tiz Well (foaled April 30, 2014 ) is an American Thoroughbred racehorse and the winner of the 2017 Cotillion Handicap.

== Career ==
It Tiz Well's first race was on October 28, 2016, at Santa Anita, where she came in third. She picked up her first win on December 18, 2016, in her second race.

She competed in her first graded race, the Grade-2 Santa Ynez Stakes, on January 8, 2017, where he came in second place. He picked up a victory the next month in a claiming race at Santa Anita on February 3, 2017.

On March 11, 2017, she picked up her first stakes win when he won the 2017 Honeybee Stakes.

She placed in third at the April 8, 2017 Santa Anita Oaks and in fourth at the June 17, 2017 Summertime Oaks.

On July 8, 2017, she picked up a win at the Grade-3 Delaware Oaks, and followed it up with a second-place finish at the August 19, 2017 Alabama Stakes.

His final race was on September 23, 2017, when she captured the 2017 Cotillion Handicap. She had an ankle bone chip injury during training on December 30, 2017, and was retired.

== Pedigree ==
Pedigree of It Tiz Well (USA), 2014
Sire Arch (USA) 1995	Kris S (USA); 1977	Roberto	Hail to Reason
Sire Arch (USA) 1995	Kris S (USA); 1977	Roberto	Bramalea
Sire Arch (USA) 1995	Kris S (USA); 1977	Sharp Queen	Princequillo
Sire Arch (USA) 1995	Kris S (USA); 1977	Sharp Queen	Bridgework
Sire Arch (USA) 1995	Aurora (USA)	Danzig	Northern Dancer
Sire Arch (USA) 1995	Aurora (USA)	Danzig	Pas De Nom
Sire Arch (USA) 1995	Aurora (USA)	Althea	Alydar
Sire Arch (USA) 1995	Aurora (USA)	Althea	Courtly Dee
Dam It Tiz (USA) 2007	Tiznow (USA); 1997	Cees Tizzy	Relaunch
Dam It Tiz (USA) 2007	Tiznow (USA); 1997	Cees Tizzy	Tizly
Dam It Tiz (USA) 2007	Tiznow (USA); 1997	Cee's Song	Seattle Song
Dam It Tiz (USA) 2007	Tiznow (USA); 1997	Cee's Song	Lovely Dancer
Dam It Tiz (USA) 2007	Star of the Woods (USA); 1998	Woodman	Mr. Prospector
Dam It Tiz (USA) 2007	Star of the Woods (USA); 1998	Woodman	Playmate
Dam It Tiz (USA) 2007	Star of the Woods (USA); 1998	Star of the River	Soviet Star
Dam It Tiz (USA) 2007	Star of the Woods (USA); 1998	Star of the River	Beautiful River
