= Gentilhombre (horse) =

British-bred Thoroughbred racehorse

- Sire: No Mercy
- Grandsire: Fortino
- Dam: Kirisana
- Damsire: Kribi
- Sex: Stallion
- Foaled: 2 April 1973
- Country: United Kingdom
- Colour: Chestnut
- Breeder: M Simpson
- Owner: T Robson; J Murrell
- Trainer: Neil Adam; Neville Callaghan
- Record: 24:9-0-3

Major wins
- Cork and Orrery Stakes (1976); Prix de l'Abbaye (1976, 1977); July Cup (1977); Diadem Stakes (1977)

Awards
- Timeform best sprinter (1977); Timeform rating 122 (1975), 125 (1976), 131 (1977), 117 (1978)

Gentilhombre (2 April 1973 – 1 January 1992) was a British Thoroughbred racehorse and sire. As a two-year-old he won four races and finished third in the Group Two Laurent Perrier Champagne Stakes. In the following year he was mainly campaigned at sprint distances and established himself as one of the fastest three-year-olds in Europe with wins in the Cork and Orrery Stakes and Prix de l'Abbaye. He was even better as a four-year-old, when he was rated the best sprinter in Europe after winning the July Cup (on the disqualification of Marinsky), the Diadem Stakes and a second Prix de l'Abbaye (in course record time). After two unsuccessful runs in 1978 he was retired from racing having won nine of his twenty-four races. He stood as a breeding stallion in Europe and Japan but had limited success as a sire of winners.

== Background ==
Gentilhombre was a chestnut horse with a narrow white blaze and a white sock on his left hind leg bred in the United Kingdom by Mrs M Simpson. He was probably the best horse sired by No Mercy, a sprinter whose best win came in the Prix de Meautry. His dam, Kirisana won one minor race over thirteen furlongs from six starts. Kirisana's breeding was somewhat unusual: her dam Tolosana was very difficult to get in foal and was covered without result by Darius in 1965. She was then allowed to run loose in a field with an obscure stallion named Kribi (runner-up in the Cesarewitch Handicap) and successfully conceived. As Tolosana had already been mated with Darius, Kirisana was officially described as being by "Darius or Kribi" but there was no doubt that the mare (foaled on 24 July 1966) was sired by Kribi.

Gentilhombre was sold for 2,000 guineas as a foal, but made only 1,000 guineas when offered for sale as a yearling. The colt was sent into training with Neil Adam a Veterinary physician who had just begun his second career as a trainer at Racecourse Farm near Melton Mowbray in Leicestershire. Adam went on to establish himself as an expert trainer of speed horses, becoming known as the "King of the Sprinters" before being forced to retire due to the effects multiple sclerosis in the early 1980s.

== Racing career ==
=== 1975: two-year-old season ===
After finishing unplaced over five furlongs on his racecourse debut, won the Fitzwilliam Stakes over the same distance at Doncaster Racecourse in May, beating Sovereign Light by half a length. After a break of three months he appeared in the Tyldesley Nursery, a handicap race for two-year-olds at Haydock Park Racecourse and won by one and a half lengths under a light weight. In September he was moved up sharply in class for the Laurent Perrier Champagne Stakes over seven furlongs at Doncaster in which he was matched against a field which included the season's leading British-trained two-year-old Wollow. Gentilhombre led from the start and looked likely to cause an upset before tiring in the closing stages and finishing third behind Wollow and Solitary Hail. He then dropped back to handicap company for the Barleythorpe Nursery over six furlongs at Leicester Racecourse and won "in a canter" after taking the lead at half-way. In his last two races, Gentilhombre was matched against older horses. He won the Vernons Sprint Trial Stakes at Haydock, beating the three-year-old filly Nagin by one and a half lengths and then finished third behind the three-year-old Be Tuneful and the four-year-old Roman Warrior in the Challenge Stakes at Newmarket.

=== 1976: three-year-old season ===
In the early part of his three-year-old season, Gentilhombre was tried over longer distances, finishing third to Wollow in the Greenham Stakes at Newbury Racecourse and unplaced behind the same colt in the 2000 Guineas over a mile at Newmarket on 28 April. The colt was then brought back to sprint distances, beginning with the Cork and Orrery Stakes over six furlongs at Royal Ascot in June. Ridden by Paul Cook, he started at odds of 17/2 which included the Duke of York Stakes winner Three Legs (who started favourite), Be Tuneful, Petipa (Moyglare Stud Stakes) and Honeyblest. Cook sent Gentilhombre to the front and was never headed, overcoming the challenge of Be Tuneful and drawing away in the closing stages to win by three lengths.

Gentilhombre was beaten in his next three races. He finished sixth behind the year's leading sprinter Lochnager in the July Cup, fifth behind the same horse in the William Hill Sprint Championship at York and fifth behind Honeyblest in the Diadem Stakes. On 3 October, the colt was sent to France to contest the Prix de l'Abbaye over 1000 metres at Longchamp Racecourse. He started a 38/1 outsider in a ten-runner field headed by the Norfolk Stakes winner Faliraki who had finished second to Lochnager at York. The other runners included Kala Shikari (Prix du Gros Chêne, Prix de Seine et Oise), the two-year-old King of Macedon, the Italian-trained Raga Navarro and Girl Friend (Prix Maurice de Gheest, Prix de Meautry, Prix de Saint-Georges, Prix du Petit Couvert). Ridden by Terry McKeown, Gentilhombre led from the start and maintained his advantage into the last 100 metres when several challengers emerged. In a very close finish the English colt was adjudged to have dead-heated with the French-trained four-year-old Mendip Man with Raga Navarro a head and a neck away in third and fourth. In their annual Racehorses of 1975 the independent Timeform organisation claimed that a viewing of the photo finish print indicated that Gentilhombre had narrowly but clearly won the race. The colt returned to England for the Vernons Sprint Cup in which he finished sixth behind Record Token. At the end of the season, Gentilhombre was sold for an undisclosed sum to J Murrell.

=== 1977: four-year-old season ===
Gentilhombre's form in the early part of the 1977 season was unimpressive as he finished sixth in the Palace House Stakes behind Raga Navarro, unplaced in the Duke of York Stakes behind Boldboy and seventh in the King's Stand Stakes behind Godswalk. In July, Gentilhombre, ridden by Cook, started at odds of 10/1 for the July Cup at Newmarket in which he was matched against Marinsky a highly talented but temperamental three-year-old trained in Ireland by Vincent O'Brien. Gentilhombre led from the start but Marinsky overtook him in the closing stages, bumping him in the process and won by a length and a half, with Mandrake Major finishing third. Following an inquiry by the racecourse stewards, the positions of the first two finishers were reversed and the race was awarded to Gentilhombre. Timeform expressed the view that the stewards may have influenced by Marinsky's previous bad behaviour. Gentilhombre was scheduled to make his next appearance in the William Hill Sprint Championship, but missed the race after a training setback.

Gentilhombre returned in September for the Diadem Stakes at Ascot. Starting at odds of 7/4, he took the lead soon after the start and drew away in the closing stages to win by three lengths from the three-year-olds Scarcely Blessed and Mandrake Major. On 2 October, Gentilhombre attempted to become the second horse to win back-to-back renewals of the Prix de l'Abbaye. Ridden as usual by Paul Cook, he started joint second-favourite behind Girl Friend at odds of 3/1 on good to firm ground. The other runners included Madang (Premio Melton, Prix du Gros Chêne), Karosa, Haveroid (William Hill Sprint Championship), Raga Navarro and King of Macedon. Gentilhombre produced what Timeform described as "a tremendous display", taking the lead at half way and accelerating clear of his opponents to win by four lengths from Madang. Haveroid was two lengths back in third, a short head in front of Girl Friend. The winning time of 56.00 was a new course record. Three weeks later, Gentilhombre returned to Longchamp and was moved up in distance for the Prix de la Forêt over 1400 metres. He started the 7/2 second favourite behind Pharly, but appeared not to stay the distance on soft ground and finished eighth of the ten runners behind Sanedtki.

=== 1978: five-year-old season ===
In 1978, Gentilhombre was transferred to the stable of Neville Callaghan. After running poorly on his debut he showed some signs of his previous ability when finishing a close fifth in the Duke of York Stakes, despite looking less than fully fit. He did not race again and was retired at the end of the season.

== Assessment ==
There was no International Classification of European two-year-olds in 1975: the official handicappers of Britain, Ireland and France compiled separate rankings for horses which competed in those countries. In the British Free Handicap, Gentilhombre was allotted a weight of 124 pounds, making him the eighth best juvenile colt, nine pounds below the top-rated Wollow. The independent Timeform organisation rated him on 122, five pounds below Wollow and eight behind the French-trained Manado. In 1976 Timeform gave Gentilhombre a rating of 125, seven pounds behind their best sprinter Lochnager. In the British three-year-old ratings he was rated ten pounds below the top-rated Vitiges. Gentilhombre was Timeform's best sprinter of 1977, when he was rated on 131. In the inaugural International Classification, he was rated equal with Buckskin as the third best older horse, behind Balmerino and Orange Bay.

== Stud career ==
After his retirement from racing, Gentilhombre became a breeding stallion, beginning his stud career at Dobsons Stud at Fawley in Buckinghamshire at a fee of $1,500. He was later exported to Japan. The most successful of his offspring was probably Kitayama Zakura, a filly who won two Grade Three races, the Shinzan Kinen and Kyoto Yonsai Tokubetsu, in 1984. Gentilhombre died on 1 January 1992 in Japan.

== Pedigree ==
Pedigree of Gentilhombre, chestnut stallion, 1973
Sire No Mercy (GB) 1968	Fortino (FR); 1959	Grey Sovereign	Nasrullah
Sire No Mercy (GB) 1968	Fortino (FR); 1959	Grey Sovereign	Kong
Sire No Mercy (GB) 1968	Fortino (FR); 1959	Ranavalo	Relic
Sire No Mercy (GB) 1968	Fortino (FR); 1959	Ranavalo	Navarra
Sire No Mercy (GB) 1968	Crowning Mercy (GB); 1960	Supreme Court	Precipitation
Sire No Mercy (GB) 1968	Crowning Mercy (GB); 1960	Supreme Court	Forecourt
Sire No Mercy (GB) 1968	Crowning Mercy (GB); 1960	Mistress Grace	Prince Chevalier
Sire No Mercy (GB) 1968	Crowning Mercy (GB); 1960	Mistress Grace	Seraglio
Dam Kirisana (GB) 1966	Kribi (GB); 1953	Alycidon	Donatello
Dam Kirisana (GB) 1966	Kribi (GB); 1953	Alycidon	Aurora
Dam Kirisana (GB) 1966	Kribi (GB); 1953	Sweet Marie	Brumeux
Dam Kirisana (GB) 1966	Kribi (GB); 1953	Sweet Marie	Sweet Ceylonese
Dam Kirisana (GB) 1966	Tolosana (ITY); 1959	Botticelli	Blue Peter
Dam Kirisana (GB) 1966	Tolosana (ITY); 1959	Botticelli	Buonamica
Dam Kirisana (GB) 1966	Tolosana (ITY); 1959	Tokamura	Navarro
Dam Kirisana (GB) 1966	Tolosana (ITY); 1959	Tokamura	Tofanella (Family 6-d)
