= July Cup =

Flat horse race in Britain

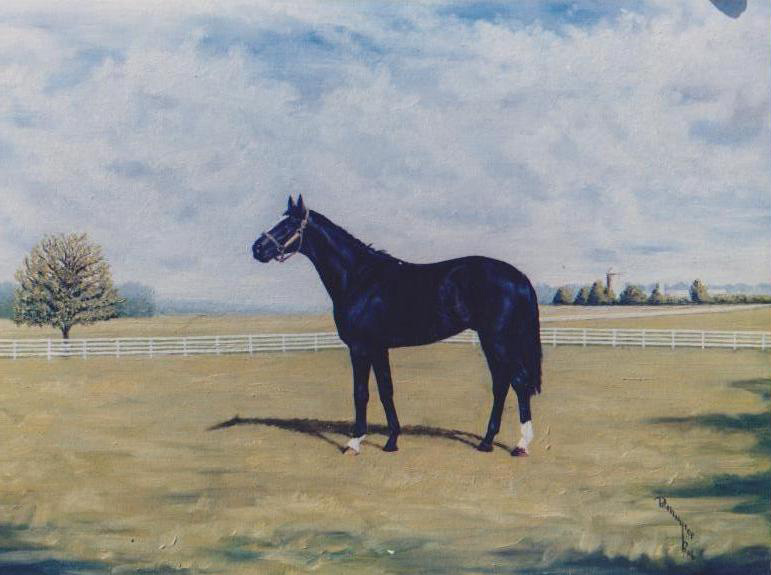
- Chief Singer, painted by Bob Demuyser oil on canvas
- Class: Group 1
- Location: July Course; Newmarket, England
- Inaugurated: 1876
- Race type: Flat / Thoroughbred
- Sponsor: Al Basti Equiworld
- Website: Newmarket

Race information
- Distance: 6f (1,207 metres)
- Surface: Turf
- Track: Straight
- Qualification: Three-years-old and up
- Weight: 9 st 2 lb (3yo); 9 st 8 lb (4yo+); Allowances; 3 lb for fillies and mares
- Purse: £657,000 (2025); 1st: £372,585

July Cup
2026
Comanche Brave	Venetian Sun	Satono Reve

Previous years
2025
No Half Measures	Big Mojo	Run To Freedom
2024
Mill Stream	Swingalong	Vandeek
2023
Shaquille	Run To Freedom	Kinross
2022
Alcohol Free	Naval Crown	Artorius
2021
Starman	Dragon Symbol	Oxted

2020-2011
2020
Oxted	Sceptical	Golden Horde
2019
Ten Sovereigns	Advertise	Fairyland
2018
U S Navy Flag	Brando	Fleet Review
2017
Harry Angel	Limato	Brando
2016
Limato	Suedois	Quiet Reflection
2015
Muhaarar	Tropics	Eastern Impact
2014
Slade Power	Tropics	Gregorian
2013
Lethal Force	Society Rock	Slade Power
2012
Mayson	The Cheka	Society Rock
2011
Dream Ahead	Bated Breath	Hitchens

2010-2001
2010
Starspangledbanner	Equiano	Alverta
2009
Fleeting Spirit	Main Aim	J J The Jet Plane
2008
Marchand D'or	US Ranger	War Artist
2007
Sakhee's Secret	Dutch Art	Red Clubs
2006
Les Arcs	Iffraaj	Ashdown Express
2005
Pastoral Pursuits	Avonbridge	Etlaala
2004
Frizzante	Ashdown Express	Balmont
2003
Oasis Dream	Choisir	Airwave
2002
Continent	Bahamian Pirate	Danehurst
2001
Mozart	Cassandra Go	Misraah

2000-1991
2000
Agnes World	Lincoln Dancer	Pipalong
1999
Stravinsky	Bold Edge	Bertolini
1998
Elnadim	Tamarisk	Danetime
1997
Compton Place	Royal Applause	Indian Rocket
1996
Anabaa	Lucayan Prince	Hever Golf Rose
1995
Lake Coniston	Piccolo	Hoh Magic
1994
Owington	Dolphin Street	Catrail
1993
Hamas	College Chapel	Zieten
1992
Mr Brooks	Pursuit Of Love	Sheikh Albadou
1991
Polish Patriot	Lycius	Elbio

1990-1981
1990
Royal Academy	Great Commotion	Rock City
1989
Cadeaux Genereux	Golden Opinion	Danehill
1988
Soviet Star	Big Shuffle	Handsome Sailor
1987
Ajdal	Gayane	Bluebird
1986
Green Desert	Grey Desire	Gwydion
1985
Never So Bold	Committed	Dafayna
1984
Chief Singer	Never So Bold	Committed
1983
Habibti	Soba	On Stage
1982
Sharpo	Vaigly Star	Indian King
1981
Marwell	Moorestyle	Sonoma

1980-1979
1980
Moorestyle	Vaigly Great	Sharpo
1979
Thatching	Vaigly Great	Greenland Park

The July Cup is a Group 1 flat horse race in Great Britain open to horses aged three years or older. It is run on the July Course at Newmarket over a distance of 6 furlongs (1,207 metres), and it is scheduled to take place each year in July.

It is recognized as one of Britain's most valuable and prestigious sprint races, and many of its winners have been acknowledged as the champion sprinter in Europe.

== History ==
The event was established in 1876, and the first two runnings were won by Springfield, a colt bred by Queen Victoria at the Hampton Court Stud.

The present system of race grading was introduced in 1971, and the July Cup was initially classed at Group 2 level. It was promoted to Group 1 status in 1978.

The July Cup was part of the Global Sprint Challenge from 2008 to 2017. It was the sixth leg of the series, preceded by the Diamond Jubilee Stakes and followed by the Sprinters Stakes.

The race is currently held on the final day of Newmarket's three-day July Festival meeting.

== Records ==
Most successful horse (3 wins):

- Sundridge – 1902, 1903, 1904

Leading jockey (10 wins):

- Lester Piggott – Vigo (1957), Right Boy (1958, 1959), Tin Whistle (1960), Thatch (1973), Saritamer (1974), Solinus (1978), Thatching (1979), Moorestyle (1980), Mr Brooks (1992)

Leading trainer (5 wins):

- Charles Morton – Sundridge (1903, 1904), Spanish Prince (1912, 1913), Golden Sun (1914)
- Aidan O'Brien – Stravinsky (1999), Mozart (2001), Starspangledbanner (2010), U S Navy Flag (2018), Ten Sovereigns (2019)
- Vincent O'Brien – Thatch (1973), Saritamer (1974), Solinus (1978), Thatching (1979), Royal Academy (1990)

Leading owner (5 wins):

- Jack Joel – Sundridge (1903, 1904), Spanish Prince (1912, 1913), Golden Sun (1914)

== Winners since 1900 ==
Year	Winner	Age	Jockey	Trainer	Owner	Time
1900	Running Stream	2	Johnny Reiff	Sam Darling
1901	Lord Bobs	3	Sam Loates	Willie Waugh		1:15.40
1902	Sundridge	4	Mornington Cannon	Joe Cannon
1903	Sundridge	5
1904	Sundridge	6	Mornington Cannon	Charles Morton
1905	Delaunay	4	Otto Madden	Peter Gilpin
1906	Thrush	4	Herbert Randall	Edward Robson	Captain J Orr-Ewing
1907	Dinneford	5	Danny Maher	Alec Taylor Jr.
1908	Lesbia	3	Danny Maher	George Blackwell
1909	Jack Snipe	4	Billy Higgs	Sam Darling
1910	Amore	3	Billy Higgs	Colledge Leader
1911	Sunder	4	Danny Maher	Charles Peck
1912	Spanish Prince	5	Frank Wootton	Charles Morton
1913	Spanish Prince	6	Frank Wootton	Charles Morton
1914	Golden Sun	4	William Huxley	Charles Morton	Jack Joel
1915	Volta	3	Steve Donoghue	Richard Dawson
1916	Torloisk	4	Joe Childs	Richard Dawson
1917	No race
1918	Irish Elegance	3	Freddie Fox	Harry Cottrill	James White
1919	Diadem	5	Steve Donoghue	George Lambton	1st Baron d'Abernon
1920	Diadem	6	George Colling	George Lambton	1st Baron d'Abernon	Walkover
1921	Tetratema	4	Brownie Carslake	Atty Persse	Dermot McCalmont	1:13.40
1922	Pharmacie	4	Steve Donoghue	Harry Cottrill	James White	1:13.20
1923	Golden Corn	4	Joe Childs	Cecil Boyd-Rochfort	Marshall Field III	1:14.80
1924	Drake	4	Michael Beary	Harry Cottrill	Mrs S Whitburn	1:14.00
1925	Diomedes	3	John Leach	Harvey Leader	S W Beer	Walkover
1926 (dh)	Diomedes; Phalaros	4; 4	John Leach; Tommy Weston	Harvey Leader; George Lambton	S W Beer; Mrs A James	1:15.20
1927	Highborn	4	Harry Beasley	Ossie Bell	Hugo Cunliffe-Owen	1:17.00
1928	Golden Oracle	3	Joe Childs	Harry Ussher	H Whitworth	1:13.80
1929	Tiffin	4	Freddie Fox	Fred Darling	4th Earl of Ellesmere	1:12.20
1930	Sir Cosmo	4	George Swann	William Walters	Richard Garton	1:12.80
1931	Xandover	4	Charlie Elliott	F Holt	J Schwod	1:12.40
1932	Concerto	4	Harry Wragg	Ossie Bell	Hugo Cunliffe-Owen	1:14.80
1933	Myrobella	3	Gordon Richards	Fred Darling	5th Earl of Lonsdale	1:13.20
1934	Coroado	4	Herbert Gunn	William Easterby	F J Lundgren	1:14.20
1935	Bellacose	3	Patrick Beasley	Robert Colling	P Dunne	1:09.80
1936	Bellacose	4	Patrick Beasley	Robert Colling	P Dunne	1:14.80
1937	Micky The Greek	3	Harry Wragg	Henry Leach	N Frieze	1:12.80
1938	Shalfleet	7	Richard Perryman	Harvey Leader	J Walker	1:14.80
1939	Portobello	3	Tommy Lowrey	Robert Colling	P Dunne	1:11.40
1940	No race
1941	Comatas	4	Billy Nevett	Ossie Bell	Miss K Farrar	1:13.20
1942-44	No race
1945	Honeyway	4	Eph Smith	Jack Jarvis	Lord Milford	1:12.00
1946	The Bug	3	Charlie Smirke	Gerald Wellesley	Norman Wachmann	1:12.40
1947	Falls of Clyde	3	Sam Wragg	Evan Williams	Miss P Vaughan	1:12.60
1948	Palm Vista	3	Eph Smith	Rufus Beasley	E Broadbelt	1:11.80
1949	Abernant	3	Gordon Richards	Noel Murless	Reginald Macdonald-Buchanan	1:11.80
1950	Abernant	4	Gordon Richards	Noel Murless	Reginald Macdonald-Buchanan	1:12.20
1951	Hard Sauce	3	Gordon Richards	Norman Bertie	Victor Sassoon	1:12.60
1952	Set Fair	3	Eph Smith	Walter Nightingall	C Bell	1:12.40
1953	Devon Vintage	3	Gordon Richards	Robert Colling	Robert Boucher	1:15.80
1954	Vilmoray	4	William Snaith	Bertie Bullock	A Green	1:12.35
1955	Pappa Fourway	3	Harry Carr	Bill Dutton	Elaine Goldson	1:13.18
1956	Matador	3	Bill Rickaby	Jack Waugh	Mrs J Ferguson	1:11.77
1957	Vigo	4	Lester Piggott	Bill Dutton	T Farr	1:15.05
1958	Right Boy	4	Lester Piggott	Bill Dutton	G Gilbert	1:15.66
1959	Right Boy	5	Lester Piggott	Pat Rohan	G Gilbert	1:12.50
1960	Tin Whistle	3	Lester Piggott	Pat Rohan	B Grainger	Walk over
1961	Galivanter	5	Harry Carr	Dick Hern	Lionel Brook Holliday	1:11.48
1962	Marsolve	4	Bill Rickaby	Reg Day	Malcolm McAlpine	1:11.58
1963	Secret Step	4	Geoff Lewis	Peter Hastings-Bass	Paul Mellon	1:12.74
1964	Daylight Robbery	3	Scobie Breasley	Arthur Budgett	R Budgett	1:12.18
1965	Merry Madcap	3	Ron Hutchinson	Freddie Maxwell	Mrs H Frelinghuysen	1:12.04
1966	Lucasland	4	Eric Eldin	Jack Waugh	J Baillie	1:11.33
1967	Forlorn River	5	Bruce Raymond	Arthur Stephenson	Mrs W A Richardson	1:14.21
1968	So Blessed	3	Frankie Durr	Michael Jarvis	David Robinson	1:13.60
1969	Tudor Music	3	Frankie Durr	Michael Jarvis	David Robinson	1:15.89
1970	Huntercombe	3	Sandy Barclay	Arthur Budgett	Horace Renshaw	1:14.42
1971	Realm	4	Brian Taylor	John Winter	Bob Boucher	1:13.60
1972	Parsimony	3	Ron Hutchinson	Fulke Johnson Houghton	Ruby Holland-Martin	1:14.07
1973	Thatch	3	Lester Piggott	Vincent O'Brien	Jack Mulcahy	1:13.10
1974	Saritamer	3	Lester Piggott	Vincent O'Brien	Charles St George	1:11.80
1975	Lianga	4	Yves Saint-Martin	Angel Penna, Sr.	Daniel Wildenstein	1:11.80
1976	Lochnager	4	Edward Hide	Mick Easterby	Charles Spence	1:12.30
1977	Gentilhombre (Note: Marinsky finished first in 1977, but was relegated to second place following a stewards' inquiry)	4	Paul Cook	Neil Adam	J. Murrell	1:11.40
1978	Solinus	3	Lester Piggott	Vincent O'Brien	Danny Schwartz	1:11.90
1979	Thatching	4	Lester Piggott	Vincent O'Brien	Robert Sangster	1:13.20
1980	Moorestyle	3	Lester Piggott	Robert Armstrong	Moores Furnishings Ltd	1:12.89
1981	Marwell	3	Walter Swinburn	Michael Stoute	Sir Edmund Loder	1:14.10
1982	Sharpo	5	Pat Eddery	Jeremy Tree	Monica Sheriffe	1:11.74
1983	Habibti	3	Willie Carson	John Dunlop	Mohamed Mutawa	1:12.11
1984	Chief Singer	3	Ray Cochrane	Ron Sheather	Jeff Smith	1:11.75
1985	Never So Bold	5	Steve Cauthen	Robert Armstrong	Edward Kessly	1:11.86
1986	Green Desert	3	Walter Swinburn	Michael Stoute	Maktoum Al Maktoum	1:12.25
1987	Ajdal	3	Walter Swinburn	Michael Stoute	Sheikh Mohammed	1:11.02
1988	Soviet Star	4	Cash Asmussen	André Fabre	Sheikh Mohammed	1:12.55
1989	Cadeaux Genereux	4	Paul Eddery	Alex Scott	Maktoum Al Maktoum	1:09.82
1990	Royal Academy	3	John Reid	Vincent O'Brien	Classic Thoroughbred plc	1:11.46
1991	Polish Patriot	3	Ray Cochrane	Guy Harwood	Dick Kirstein	1:12.98
1992	Mr Brooks	5	Lester Piggott	Richard Hannon Sr.	Paul Green	1:11.80
1993	Hamas	4	Willie Carson	Peter Walwyn	Hamdan Al Maktoum	1:13.08
1994	Owington	3	Paul Eddery	Geoff Wragg	Baron G. von Ullmann	1:10.96
1995	Lake Coniston	4	Pat Eddery	Geoff Lewis	Highclere Racing Ltd	1:12.42
1996	Anabaa	4	Freddy Head	Criquette Head	Ghislaine Head	1:10.63
1997	Compton Place	3	Seb Sanders	James Toller	11th Duke of Devonshire	1:12.10
1998	Elnadim	4	Richard Hills	John Dunlop	Hamdan Al Maktoum	1:09.72
1999	Stravinsky	3	Michael Kinane	Aidan O'Brien	Magnier / Tabor	1:09.51
2000	Agnes World	5	Yutaka Take	Hideyuki Mori	Takao Watanabe	1:13.18
2001	Mozart	3	Michael Kinane	Aidan O'Brien	Tabor / Magnier	1:09.86
2002	Continent	5	Darryll Holland	David Nicholls	Lucayan Stud	1:13.00
2003	Oasis Dream	3	Richard Hughes	John Gosden	Khalid Abdullah	1:09.94
2004	Frizzante	5	Johnny Murtagh	James Fanshawe	Hopper / Grundy	1:11.51
2005	Pastoral Pursuits	4	John Egan	Hughie Morrison	Pursuits / National Stud	1:11.86
2006	Les Arcs	6	John Egan	Tim Pitt	Willie McKay	1:11.16
2007	Sakhee's Secret	3	Steve Drowne	Hughie Morrison	Bridget Swire	1:10.77
2008	Marchand d'Or	5	Davy Bonilla	Freddy Head	Carla Giral	1:11.01
2009	Fleeting Spirit	4	Tom Queally	Jeremy Noseda	The Searchers	1:09.58
2010	Starspangledbanner	4	Johnny Murtagh	Aidan O'Brien	Michael Tabor et al.	1:09.81
2011	Dream Ahead	3	Hayley Turner	David Simcock	Khalifa Dasmal	1:10.66
2012	Mayson	4	Paul Hanagan	Richard Fahey	David W. Armstrong	1:15.90
2013	Lethal Force	4	Adam Kirby	Clive Cox	Alan G. Craddock	1:09.11
2014	Slade Power	5	Wayne Lordan	Edward Lynam	Sabena Power	1:12.40
2015	Muhaarar	3	Paul Hanagan	Charlie Hills	Hamdan Al Maktoum	1:09.34
2016	Limato	4	Harry Bentley	Henry Candy	Paul G. Jacobs	1:09.97
2017	Harry Angel	3	Adam Kirby	Clive Cox	Godolphin	1:11:25
2018	U S Navy Flag	3	Ryan Moore	Aidan O'Brien	Tabor / Smith / Magnier	1:11:32
2019	Ten Sovereigns	3	Ryan Moore	Aidan O'Brien	Tabor / Smith / Magnier	1:09.31
2020	Oxted	4	Cieren Fallon	Roger Teal	S Piper, T Hirschfeld & D Fish	1:09.59
2021	Starman	4	Tom Marquand	Ed Walker	David Ward	1:10.11
2022	Alcohol Free	4	Rob Hornby	Andrew Balding	Jeff Smith	1:09.47
2023	Shaquille	3	Rossa Ryan	Julie Camacho	Hughes, Rawlings, O'Shaughnessy	1:11.68
2024	Mill Stream	4	William Buick	Jane Chapple-Hyam	Peter Harris	1:10.90
2025	No Half Measures	4	Neil Callan	Richard Hughes	Richard Gallagher	1:11.18
2026	Comanche Brave	4	Billy Loughnane	Donnacha O'Brien	Muhaideb A Almuhaideb	1:09.99

== Earlier winners ==
- 1876: Springfield
- 1877: Springfield
- 1878: Trappist
- 1879: Phenix
- 1880: Charibert
- 1881: Charibert
- 1882: Tristan
- 1883: Clairvaux
- 1884: Geheimniss
- 1885: Energy
- 1886: Melton
- 1887: Ormonde
- 1888: Fullerton
- 1889: Mephisto
- 1890: Queen of the Fairies
- 1891: Memoir
- 1892: Workington
- 1893: Prince Hampton
- 1894: Best Man
- 1895: Woolsthorpe
- 1896: Worcester
- 1897: Kilcock
- 1898: Ugly
- 1899: Eager

== See also ==
- Horse racing in Great Britain
- List of British flat horse races
