= Prix de l'Abbaye de Longchamp =

- Class: Group 1
- Location: Longchamp Racecourse; Paris, France
- Inaugurated: 1957
- Race type: Flat / Thoroughbred
- Sponsor: Qatar
- Website: france-galop.com

Race information
- Distance: 1,000 metres (5f)
- Surface: Turf
- Track: Straight
- Qualification: Two-years-old and up
- Weight: 54 kg (2yo); 62 kg (3yo+); Allowances; 1½ kg for fillies and mares
- Purse: €350,000 (2021); 1st: €199,990

Prix de l'Abbaye de Longchamp
2026
Miss Yechance	Shiri	Mission Central

Previous years
2025
Asfoora	Jawwal	She's Quality
2024
Makarova	Bradsell	Believing
2023
Highfield Princess	Perdika	Aesop's Fables
2022
The Platinum Queen	White Lavender	Coeur De Pierre
2021
A Case Of You	Air De Valse	Glass Slippers

2020-2011
2020
Wooded	Glass Slippers	Liberty Beach
2019
Glass Slippers	So Perfect	El Astronaute
2018
Mabs Cross	Gold Vibe	Soldier's Call
2017
Battaash	Marsha	Profitable
2016
Marsha	Washington	Mecca's Angel
2015
Goldream	Rangali	Muthmir
2014
Move In Time	Rangali	Moviesta
2013
Maarek	Catcall	Hamza
2012
Wizz Kid	Mayson	Hamish McGonagall
2011
Tangerine Trees	Secret Asset	Sole Power

2010-2001
2010
Gilt Edge Girl	Lady Of The Desert	Mar Adentro
2009
Total Gallery	Fleeting Spirit	War Artist
2008
Marchand D'or	Moorhouse Lad	Borderlescott
2007
Benbaun	Kingsgate Native	Desert Lord
2006
Desert Lord	Reverence	Moss Vale
2005
Avonbridge	Striking Ambition	Fire Up The Band
2004
Var	The Tatling	Royal Millennium
2003
Patavellian	The Trader	The Tatling
2002
Continent	Slap Shot	Zipping
2001
Imperial Beauty	Bahamian Pirate	Pipalong

2000-1991
2000
Namid	Superstar Leo	Pipalong
1999
Agnes World	Imperial Beauty	Keos
1998
My Best Valentine	Averti	Sainte Marine
1997
Carmine Lake	Pas De Reponse	Royal Applause
1996
Kistena	Anabaa	Hever Golf Rose
1995
Hever Golf Rose	Cherokee Rose	Eveningperformance
1994
Lochsong	Mistertopogigo	Spain Lane
1993
Lochsong	Stack Rock	Monde Bleu
1992
Mr Brooks	Keen Hunter	Elbio
1991
Keen Hunter	Sheikh Albadou	Magic Ring

1990-1983
1990
Dayjur	Lugana Beach	Pharaoh's Delight
1989
Silver Fling	Zadracarta	Nabeel Dancer
1988
Handsome Sailor	Caerwent	Silver Fling
1987
Polonia	La Grande Epoque	Tenue de Soiree
1986
Double Schwartz	Parioli	Hallgate
1985
Committed	Vilikaia	Parioli
1984
Committed	Habibti	Anita's Prince
1983
Habibti	Soba	Sicyos

The Prix de l'Abbaye de Longchamp is a Group 1 flat horse race in France open to thoroughbreds aged two years or older. It is run at Longchamp over a distance of 1,000 metres (about 5 furlongs), and it is scheduled to take place each year in early October.

== History ==
The event is named after the Abbaye de Longchamp, an abbey founded in the 13th century by Isabelle, the sister of Saint Louis. The abbey was located on what became the northern edge of the racecourse. It was destroyed during the French Revolution, and its site is now partly occupied by the Château de Longchamp.

The Prix de l'Abbaye was one of two major races introduced to celebrate Longchamp's centenary in 1957. Both were added to the Prix de l'Arc de Triomphe fixture, which is usually on the first Sunday in October. The other event, the Prix du Moulin, was subsequently moved to September.

The present system of race grading was introduced in 1971, and the Prix de l'Abbaye was initially given Group 2 status. It was promoted to Group 1 level in 1976. It originally excluded geldings, but the restriction was lifted in 2001.

The Prix de l'Abbaye became part of the Breeders' Cup Challenge series in 2009. From this point the winner earned an automatic invitation to compete in the Breeders' Cup Turf Sprint. It was removed from the series in 2011.

== Records ==
Most successful horse (2 wins):

- Texanita – 1963, 1964
- Gentilhombre – 1976 (dead-heat), 1977
- Committed – 1984, 1985
- Lochsong – 1993, 1994

Leading jockey (5 wins):

- Yves Saint-Martin – Fortino (1962), Texanita (1963), Silver Shark (1965), Farhana (1966), Lianga (1975)

Leading trainer (8 wins):

- François Mathet – Texana (1957), Edellic (1958), Fortino (1962), Texanita (1963, 1964), Silver Shark (1965), Farhana (1966), Moubariz (1974)

Leading owner (4 wins):

- François Dupré – Texana (1957), Fortino (1962), Texanita (1963, 1964)
- Robert Sangster – Committed (1984), Double Schwartz (1986), Handsome Sailor (1988), Carmine Lake (1997)

== Winners since 1972 ==
Year	Winner	Age	Jockey	Trainer	Owner	Time
1972	Deep Diver	3	Bill Williamson	Paul Davey	David Robinson	0:57.00
1973	Sandford Lad	3	Tony Murray	Ryan Price	C. T. Olley	0:59.20
1974	Moubariz	3	Henri Samani	François Mathet	HH Aga Khan IV	0:59.70
1975	Lianga	4	Yves Saint-Martin	Angel Penna	Daniel Wildenstein	0:59.20
1976 (dh)	Gentilhombre; Mendip Man	3; 4	Terry McKeown; Alfred Gibert	Neil Adam; Aage Paus	J. Murrell; Mrs Jack Davis	1:00.30
1977	Gentilhombre	4	Paul Cook	Neil Adam	J. Murrell	0:58.00
1978	Sigy	2	Freddy Head	Criquette Head	Ghislaine Head	0:59.00
1979	Double Form	4	John Reid	Fulke Johnson Houghton	Baroness Thyssen	0:56.70
1980	Moorestyle	3	Lester Piggott	Robert Armstrong	Moores Furnishings Ltd	0:56.30
1981	Marwell	3	Walter Swinburn	Michael Stoute	Sir Edmund Loder	0:59.70
1982	Sharpo	5	Pat Eddery	Jeremy Tree	Monica Sheriffe	1:01.20
1983	Habibti	3	Willie Carson	John Dunlop	Mohamed Mutawa	0:54.30
1984	Committed	4	Steve Cauthen	Dermot Weld	Robert Sangster	0:59.80
1985	Committed	5	Michael Kinane	Dermot Weld	Allen Paulson	0:55.20
1986	Double Schwartz	5	Pat Eddery	Charlie Nelson	Robert Sangster	0:56.80
1987	Polonia	3	Christy Roche	Jim Bolger	Henryk de Kwiatkowski	0:56.70
1988	Handsome Sailor (Note: Cadeaux Genereux finished first in 1988, but he was disqualified following a stewards' inquiry.)	5	Michael Hills	Barry Hills	Robert Sangster	0:57.00
1989	Silver Fling	4	John Matthias	Ian Balding	George Strawbridge	0:59.90
1990	Dayjur	3	Willie Carson	Dick Hern	Hamdan Al Maktoum	0:58.70
1991	Keen Hunter	4	Steve Cauthen	John Gosden	Sheikh Mohammed	0:59.40
1992	Mr Brooks	5	Lester Piggott	Richard Hannon Sr.	Paul Green	1:02.30
1993	Lochsong	5	Frankie Dettori	Ian Balding	Jeff Smith	0:59.70
1994	Lochsong	6	Frankie Dettori	Ian Balding	Jeff Smith	0:57.20
1995	Hever Golf Rose	4	Jason Weaver	Joe Naughton	Michael Hanson	0:57.70
1996	Kistena	3	Olivier Doleuze	Criquette Head	Wertheimer et Frère	0:59.30
1997	Carmine Lake	3	John Reid	Peter Chapple-Hyam	Robert Sangster	0:56.90
1998	My Best Valentine	8	Ray Cochrane	Vic Soane	The Valentines	0:58.90
1999	Agnes World	4	Yutaka Take	Hideyuki Mori	Takao Watanabe	1:01.40
2000	Namid	4	Johnny Murtagh	John Oxx	Lady Clague	0:55.10
2001	Imperial Beauty	5	Yutaka Take	John Hammond	Magnier / Tabor	1:00.30
2002	Continent	5	Darryll Holland	David Nicholls	Lucayan Stud	0:57.20
2003	Patavellian	5	Steve Drowne	Roger Charlton	Daniel Deer	0:59.30
2004	Var	5	Frankie Dettori	Clive Brittain	Mohammed Rashid	0:55.00
2005	Avonbridge	5	Steve Drowne	Roger Charlton	Daniel Deer	0:56.90
2006	Desert Lord	6	Jamie Spencer	Kevin Ryan	Bull & Bell Partnership	0:54.80
2007	Benbaun	6	Pat Smullen	Mark Wallace	Ransley / Birks / Hillen	0:56.70
2008	Marchand d'Or (Note: The scheduled running in 2008 was "won" by Overdose, but it had a false start and was declared void. Marchand d'Or won the re-run.)	5	Davy Bonilla	Freddy Head	Carla Giral	0:54.40
2009	Total Gallery	3	Johnny Murtagh	Stan Moore	Coleman Bloodstock Ltd	0:55.10
2010	Gilt Edge Girl	4	Luke Morris	Clive Cox	Wood Street V / Harper	0:57.00
2011	Tangerine Trees	6	Tom Eaves	Bryan Smart	Tangerine Trees P'ship	0:55.53
2012	Wizz Kid	4	Gérald Mossé	Robert Collet	Maeve Mahony	1:01.17
2013	Maarek	6	Declan McDonogh	Barry Lalor	Lisbunny Syndicate	0:57.50
2014	Move In Time	6	Daniel Tudhope	David O'Meara	A Turton, J Blackburn & R Bond	0:56.42
2015	Goldream	6	Martin Harley	Robert Cowell	J Sargeant & Mrs J Morley	0:54.79
2016	Marsha (Note: The 2016 and 2017 runnings took place at Chantilly while Longchamp was closed for redevelopment.)	3	Luke Morris	Mark Prescott	Elite Racing Club	0:57.27
2017	Battaash	3	Jim Crowley	Charles Hills	Hamdan Al Maktoum	0:57.59
2018	Mabs Cross	4	Gérald Mossé	Michael Dods	David W Armstrong	0:57.11
2019	Glass Slippers	3	Tom Eaves	Kevin Ryan	Bearstone Stud	0:58.04
2020	Wooded	3	Pierre-Charles Boudot	Francis-Henri Graffard	Al Shaqab Racing	0:58.52
2021	A Case of You	3	Ronan Whelan	Adrian McGuinness	Gary Devlin	0:58.02
2022	The Platinum Queen	2	Hollie Doyle	Richard Fahey	Middleham Park Racing XV	0:58.65
2023	Highfield Princess	6	Jason Hart	John Quinn	Trainers House Enterprises	0:55.07
2024	Makarova	5	Tom Marquand	Ed Walker	Brightwalton Bloodstock Ltd	0:56.33
2025	Asfoora	7	Oisin Murphy	Henry Dwyer	Noor Elaine Farm Pty Ltd	0:56.39
2025	Miss Yechance	3	Jack Nicholls	Karl Burke	Al Leith Racing Club	0:55.08

== Earlier winners ==
- 1957: Texana
- 1958: Edellic
- 1959: Sly Pola
- 1960: High Bulk
- 1961: L'Epinay
- 1962: Fortino
- 1963: Texanita
- 1964: Texanita
- 1965: Silver Shark
- 1966: Farhana
- 1967: Pentathlon
- 1968: Be Friendly
- 1969: Tower Walk
- 1970: Balidar
- 1971: Sweet Revenge

== See also ==
- List of French flat horse races
