= Ballyogan Stakes =

Flat horse race in Ireland

- Class: Group 3
- Location: Curragh; County Kildare, Ireland
- Race type: Flat / Thoroughbred
- Sponsor: Qatar Racing and Equestrian Club
- Website: Curragh

Race information
- Distance: 6f (1,207 metres)
- Surface: Turf
- Track: Straight
- Qualification: Three-years-old and up fillies and mares
- Weight: 9 st 0 lb (3yo); 9 st 8 lb (4yo+); Penalties; 5 lb for Group 1 or Group 2 winners * 3 lb for Group 3 winners * * since 1 July last year
- Purse: €50,000 (2021); 1st: €29,500

Ballyogan Stakes
2026
Chantez	Soul Love	Dancing Saxon

Previous years
2025
Sky Majesty	Vespertilio	Carla Ridge
2024
Shandy	Firebird	Pandora's Gift
2023
Ocean Quest	Aussie Girl	Secret Angel
2022
Perfect News	Benefit	Teresa Mendoza
2021
Sonaiyla	Romantic Proposal	Teresa Mendoza
2020
Millisle	Pronouncement	Lady Penelope
2019
Soffia	Dan's Dream	Queen Jo Jo
2018
Actress	Gorane	One Master
2017
Penny Pepper	Only Mine	Alphabet
2016
Divine	Fort Del Oro	Only Mine
2015
Ainippe	Newsletter	Steip Amach
2014
Majestic Queen	Joyeuse	Sparrow
2013
Fiesolana	Boston Rocker	Hanky Panky
2012
Fire Lily	After	Gossamer Seed
2011
Radharcnafarraige	Peahen	Knock Stars

2010-2001
2010
Gilt Edge Girl	Beyond Desire	Distinctive
2009
Lesson In Humility	San Sicharia	Maoineach
2008
Age Of Chivalry	Eastern Romance	Cartimandua
2007
Liscanna	That's Hot	Absolutelyfabulous
2006
Yomalo	Noelani	Mecca's Mate
2005
La Cucaracha	Alexander Icequeen	Kind
2004
Golden Nun	Simianna	Topkamp
2003
Miss Anabaa	Belle Du Jour	Marino Marini
2002
Jessica's Dream	Miss Beabea	Newpark Lady
2001
Dietrich	Final Exam	Miracle Ridge

2000-1991
2000
Rudi's Pet	Cassandra Go	Monkston Point
1999
Proud Native	Carhue Lass	Sharp Catch
1998
Lidanna	Strike Hard	Almaty
1997
Catch The Blues	Ailleacht	Bolshoi
1996
Anzio	Ailleacht	Sunset Reigns
1995
Millstream	Mistertopogigo	Petite Fantasy
1994
Great Deeds	Sabre Rattler	Palacegate Episode
1993
Sea Gazer	Bradawn Breever	Palacegate Episode
1992
Freddie Lloyd	Maledetto	Flowing
1991
Mr Brooks	Sandhurst Goddess	Clean Cut

1990-1988
1990
Wicked Folly	Shuttlecock Corner	Paley Prince
1989
Gallic League	Shuttlecock Corner	Eloquent Minister
1988
Knesset	Totem	Polykratis

The Ballyogan Stakes is a Group 3 flat horse race in Ireland open to thoroughbred fillies and mares aged three years or older. It is run at The Curragh over a distance of 6 furlongs (1,207 metres), and it is scheduled to take place each year in June.

The event was formerly contested at Leopardstown over 5 furlongs and open to horses of either gender. It was held at Cork from 2002 to 2004, and on the last occasion it became a 6-furlong race for fillies and mares. It returned to Leopardstown from 2005 to 2014 before moving to The Curragh from 2015.

== Records ==
Most successful horse:

- no horse has won this race more than once since 1975

Leading jockey since 1975 (4 wins):

- Tommy Murphy – Boone's Cabin (1975), Godswalk (1977), Solinus (1978), Monroe (1980)
- Michael Kinane – Reelin Jig (1976), Committed (1985), Lidanna (1998), Dietrich (2001)

Leading trainer since 1975 (7 wins):

- Vincent O'Brien – Boone's Cabin (1975), Godswalk (1977), Solinus (1978), Golden Thatch (1979), Monroe (1980), Longleat (1982), Bluebird (1987)

== Winners since 1975 ==
Year	Winner	Age	Jockey	Trainer	Time
1975	Boone's Cabin	5	Tommy Murphy	Vincent O'Brien	1:00.00
1976	Reelin Jig	3	Michael Kinane	Liam Browne	0:58.60
1977	Godswalk	3	Tommy Murphy	Vincent O'Brien
1978	Solinus	3	Tommy Murphy	Vincent O'Brien
1979	Golden Thatch	3	Lester Piggott	Vincent O'Brien	0:59.60
1980	Monroe	3	Tommy Murphy	Vincent O'Brien
1981	Cooleen Jack (Note: Prince Echo and Jasmine Star finished first and second in 1981, but the race was awarded to the third-placed horse)	3	Pat Gilson	Edward O'Grady
1982	Longleat	3	Pat Eddery	Vincent O'Brien
1983	Bri-Eden	9	Stephen Craine	Jack Berry	1:01.00
1984	Princess Tracy	3	Raymond Carroll	Michael Cunningham
1985	Committed	5	Michael Kinane	Dermot Weld	0:58.90
1986	Wolverstar	4	Stephen Craine	P. Norris	0:59.60
1987	Bluebird	3	Cash Asmussen	Vincent O'Brien	0:58.60
1988	Knesset	5	Pat Shanahan	John Costelloe	0:58.30
1989	Gallic League	4	Michael Hills	Barry Hills	0:59.10
1990	Wicked Folly	3	Wayne Harris	Kevin Prendergast	0:58.20
1991	Mr Brooks	4	Pat Shanahan	Kevin Connolly	0:59.40
1992	Freddie Lloyd	3	John Reid	Neville Callaghan	0:58.00
1993	Sea Gazer	3	Kevin Darley	David Barron	1:00.00
1994	Great Deeds	3	Paul Eddery	Mick Channon	0:59.50
1995	Millstream	3	Darryll Holland	Mark Johnston	0:58.00
1996	Anzio	5	Ray Cochrane	Gay Kelleway	0:58.90
1997	Catch the Blues	5	Christy Roche	Aidan O'Brien	1:00.90
1998	Lidanna	5	Michael Kinane	David Hanley	0:58.00
1999	Proud Native	5	Alex Greaves	David Nicholls	1:00.40
2000	Rudi's Pet	6	Seb Sanders	David Nicholls	1:00.40
2001	Dietrich	3	Michael Kinane	Aidan O'Brien	1:01.80
2002	Jessica's Dream	4	Micky Fenton	James Given	1:00.50
2003	Miss Anabaa	4	Fran Berry	Rae Guest	0:58.80
2004	Golden Nun	4	Robert Winston	Tim Easterby	1:07.50
2005	La Cucaracha	4	Michael Hills	Barry Hills	1:13.50
2006	Yomalo	6	Pat Smullen	Rae Guest	1:14.30
2007	Liscanna	3	Wayne Lordan	David Wachman	1:12.80
2008	Age of Chivalry	3	Fran Berry	John Oxx	1:14.64
2009	Lesson in Humility	4	Andrew Elliott	Karl Burke	1:12.85
2010	Gilt Edge Girl	4	Luke Morris	Clive Cox	1:13.13
2011	Radharcnafarraige	3	Kevin Manning	Jim Bolger	1:13.59
2012	Fire Lily	3	Wayne Lordan	David Wachman	1:15.30
2013	Fiesolana	4	Colm O'Donoghue	Willie McCreery	1:13.93
2014	Majestic Queen	4	Pat Smullen	Tracey Collins	1:15.81
2015	Ainippe	3	Colin Keane	Ger Lyons	1:11.92
2016	Divine	5	Ronan Whelan	Mick Channon	1:12.21
2017	Penny Pepper	5	Chris Hayes	Kevin Prendergast	1:16.34
2018	Actress	3	Seamie Heffernan	Aidan O'Brien	1:11.30
2019	Soffia	4	Declan McDonogh	Edward Lynam	1:13.86
2020	Millisle (Note: The 2020 race was run at Naas in July due to the COVID-19 pandemic in the Republic of Ireland)	3	Shane Foley	Jessica Harrington	1:10.85
2021	Sonaiyla	5	Ronan Whelan	Paddy Twomey	1:14.23
2022	Perfect News	3	Chris Hayes	William Haggas	1:11.43
2023	Ocean Quest	3	Shane Foley	Jessica Harrington	1:10.21
2024	Shandy	3	Andrew Slattery	Fozzy Stack	1:12.20
2025	Sky Majesty	3	Tom Marquand	William Haggas	1:11.06
2026	Chantez	4	Gary Carroll	Ger Lyons	1:09.30

== See also ==
- Horse racing in Ireland
- List of Irish flat horse races
