= Diomed Stakes =

Flat horse race in Britain

- Class: Group 3
- Location: Epsom Downs; Epsom, England
- Inaugurated: 1971
- Race type: Flat / Thoroughbred
- Sponsor: Betfred
- Website: Epsom Downs

Race information
- Distance: 1m 113y (1,713 metres)
- Surface: Turf
- Track: Left-handed
- Qualification: Three-years-old and up
- Weight: 8 st 10 lb (3yo); 9 st 8 lb (4yo+); Allowances; 3 lb for fillies and mares Penalties; 7 lb for Group 1 winners * 5 lb for Group 2 winners * 3 lb for Group 3 winners * * since August 31 last year
- Purse: £100,000 (2025); 1st: £56,710

Diomed Stakes
2026
Seagulls Eleven	Persica	Boiling Point

Previous years
2025
Persica	Ice Max	Docklands
2024
Royal Scotsman	Royal Dubai	Highland Avenue
2023
Regal Reality	Highland Avenue	Kolsai
2022
Megallan	Modern News	Mutasaabeq
2021
Oh This Is Us	Century Dream	Bell Rock

2020-2011
2020
Century Dream	King Of Comedy	Zaaki
2019
Zaaki	Oh This Is Us	Chief Ironside
2018
Century Dream	Gabrial	True Valour
2017
Sovereign Debt	Gabrial	Oh This Is Us
2016
Tullius	Decorated Knight	Custom Cut
2015
Arod	Custom Cut	Complicit
2014
French Navy	Graphic	Windhoek
2013
Gregorian	Penitent	Gabrial
2012
Side Glance	Dance And Dance	Mac Love
2011
Fanunalter	St Moritz	Rio De La Plata

2010-2001
2010
Bushman	Alexandros	Mabait
2009
Mac Love	Confront	Deposer
2008
Blythe Knight	Alexandros	Young Pretender
2007
Blythe Knight	Blue Ksar	Welsh Emperor
2006
Nayyir	Boule d'Or	Home Affairs
2005
Hazyview	Brunel	Grand Emporium
2004
Passing Glance	Dutch Gold	Gateman
2003
Gateman	Reel Buddy	King of Happiness
2002
Nayyir	Highdown	Wannabe Around
2001
Pulau Tioman	Cauvery	Soviet Flash

2000-1991
2000
Trans Island	Duck Row	Ramooz
1999
Lear Spear	Yakareem	Wallace
1998
Intikhab	Hidden Meadow	Almushtarak
1997
Polar Prince	Faithful Son	Cap Juluca
1996
Blomberg	Behaviour	Mr Martini
1995
Mr Martini	Be Mindful	Chato
1994
Bluegrass Prince	Pinkerton's Pal	Cotteir Chief
1993
Enharmonic	Thourios	Zaahi
1992
Zaahi	Misterioso	Pfalz
1991
Sylva Honda	Fair Average	Regal Sabre

1990-1988
1990
Eton Lad	Landyap	Filia Ardross
1989
Shining Steel	Beau Sher	Greensmith
1988
Waajib	Luzum	Bold Citadel

The Diomed Stakes is a Group 3 flat horse race in Great Britain open to horses aged three years or older. It is run at Epsom Downs over a distance of 1 mile and 113 yards (1,713 metres), and it is scheduled to take place each year in late May or early June.

The event is named after Diomed, the inaugural winner of Epsom's most famous race, the Epsom Derby. It was established in 1971, although it could be regarded as a continuation of a previous event, the St James Stakes.

The Diomed Stakes is now held on the first day of Epsom's two-day Derby Festival meeting, the same day as the Epsom Oaks.

== Records ==
Most successful horse (2 wins):

- All Friends – 1975, 1976
- Nayyir – 2002, 2006
- Blythe Knight – 2007, 2008
- Century Deam - 2018, 2020

Leading jockey (4 wins):

- Lester Piggott – Sparkler (1971), Averof (1974), Hardgreen (1980), Adonijah (1984)

Leading trainer (3 wins):

- Clive Brittain – Averof (1974), Sylva Honda (1991), Mr Martini (1995)
- Sir Henry Cecil – Ovac (1978), Adonijah (1984), Shining Steel (1989)
- Andrew Balding - Passing Glance (2004), Side Glance (2012), Tullius (2016)
- Sir Michael Stoute - Scottish Reel (1985), Zaaki (2019), Regal Reality (2023)

== Winners ==
Year	Winner	Age	Jockey	Trainer	Time
1971	Sparkler	3	Lester Piggott	Sam Armstrong	1:45.76
1972	Sallust	3	Joe Mercer	Dick Hern	1:42.25
1973	Owen Dudley	3	Geoff Lewis	Noel Murless	1:44.25
1974	Averof	3	Lester Piggott	Clive Brittain	1:41.48
1975	All Friends	3	Paul Cook	Nick Vigors	1:44.50
1976	All Friends	4	Paul Cook	Nick Vigors	1:41.89
1977	Gunner B	4	Joe Mercer	Geoff Toft	1:44.52
1978	Ovac	5	Joe Mercer	Henry Cecil	1:43.49
1979	Spring in Deepsea	4	Greville Starkey	Luca Cumani	1:44.40
1980	Hardgreen	4	Lester Piggott	Michael Stoute	1:41.31
1981	Saher	5	Ray Cochrane	Ron Sheather	1:48.24
1982	Prima Voce	3	Bruce Raymond	Robert Armstrong	1:43.32
1983	Lofty	3	Paul Cook	Harry Thomson Jones	1:49.09
1984	Adonijah	4	Lester Piggott	Henry Cecil	1:43.94
1985	Scottish Reel	3	Walter Swinburn	Michael Stoute	1:47.97
1986	Pennine Walk	4	Pat Eddery	Jeremy Tree	1:43.28
1987	Lauries Warrior	3	Michael Roberts	Ron Boss	1:41.00
1988	Waajib	5	Michael Roberts	Alec Stewart	1:42.38
1989	Shining Steel	3	Steve Cauthen	Henry Cecil	1:42.99
1990	Eton Lad	3	Cash Asmussen	Neville Callaghan	1:43.37
1991	Sylva Honda	3	Alan Munro	Clive Brittain	1:40.75
1992	Zaahi	3	Richard Hills	Harry Thomson Jones	1:43.50
1993	Enharmonic	6	Frankie Dettori	Lord Huntingdon	1:44.04
1994	Bluegrass Prince	3	Brent Thomson	Richard Hannon Sr.	1:41.51
1995	Mr Martini	5	Michael Roberts	Clive Brittain	1:42.51
1996	Blomberg	4	David Harrison	James Fanshawe	1:43.59
1997	Polar Prince	4	Ray Cochrane	Michael Jarvis	1:42.26
1998	Intikhab	4	Frankie Dettori	Saeed bin Suroor	1:41.42
1999	Lear Spear	4	Richard Quinn	David Elsworth	1:43.73
2000	Trans Island	5	Kieren Fallon	Ian Balding	1:44.15
2001	Pulau Tioman	5	Philip Robinson	Michael Jarvis	1:42.70
2002	Nayyir	4	Eddie Ahern	Gerard Butler	1:45.78
2003	Gateman	6	Keith Dalgleish	Mark Johnston	1:41.37
2004	Passing Glance	5	Martin Dwyer	Andrew Balding	1:42.40
2005	Hazyview	4	Darryll Holland	Neville Callaghan	1:44.73
2006	Nayyir	8	Frankie Dettori	Gerard Butler	1:43.48
2007	Blythe Knight	7	Graham Gibbons	John Quinn	1:43.36
2008	Blythe Knight	8	Graham Gibbons	John Quinn	1:45.50
2009	Mac Love	8	Micky Fenton	Stef Liddiard	1:43.61
2010	Bushman	6	William Buick	David Simcock	1:43.03
2011	Fanunalter	5	Adam Kirby	Marco Botti	1:45.12
2012	Side Glance	5	Jimmy Fortune	Andrew Balding	1:43.37
2013	Gregorian	4	William Buick	John Gosden	1:48.68
2014	French Navy	6	Adam Kirby	Charlie Appleby	1:41.71
2015	Arod	4	Andrea Atzeni	Peter Chapple-Hyam	1:43.09
2016	Tullius	8	Jimmy Fortune	Andrew Balding	1:47.90
2017	Sovereign Debt	8	James Sullivan	Ruth Carr	1:42.61
2018	Century Dream	4	William Buick	Simon Crisford	1:43.57
2019	Zaaki	4	Ryan Moore	Sir Michael Stoute	1:40.46
2020 (Note: The 2020 race was run at Newbury due to the COVID-19 pandemic in the United Kingdom)	Century Dream	6	James Doyle	Simon & Ed Crisford	1:37.25
2021	Oh This Is Us	8	Tom Marquand	Richard Hannon Jr.	1:47.31
2022	Megallan	4	Frankie Dettori	John and Thady Gosden	1:43.41
2023	Regal Reality	8	Ryan Moore	Sir Michael Stoute	1:43.56
2024	Royal Scotsman	4	Jamie Spencer	Paul & Oliver Cole	1:45.31
2025	Persica	4	Ryan Moore	Richard Hannon Jr.	1:44.57
2026	Seagulls Eleven	4	Oisin Murphy	Hugo Palmer	1:46.74

== See also ==
- Horse racing in Great Britain
- List of British flat horse races
