= Marinsky =

Marinsky Маринский
- Khutor
- Location within Volgograd Oblast Location within Russia
- Coordinates: 50°38′N 43°43′E
- Country: Russia
- Region: Volgograd Oblast
- District: Yelansky District
- Time zone: UTC+4:00

Marinsky (Russian: Маринский) is a rural locality (a khutor) in Bolshevistskoye Rural Settlement, Yelansky District, Volgograd Oblast, Russia. As of 2010, the population was 342. There are 3 streets.

== Geography ==
Marinsky is located on Khopyorsko-Buzulukskaya Plain, on the left bank of the Buzuluk River, 56 km south of Yelan (the district's administrative centre) by road. Bolshevik is the nearest rural locality.
