= Robert Armstrong (racehorse trainer) =

British racehorse trainer (1944–2021)

Robert Walter Armstrong (15 January 1944 – 5 February 2021) was a British horse trainer who trained horses competing in flat racing. In a career lasting from 1973 until 2000 he trained the winners of 737 races in Great Britain, including 13 at Group One level. He was the son of Sam Armstrong (1904–1982) and grandson of Bob Armstrong, who were both also racehorse trainers. Robert Armstong's sister, Susan, married the champion jockey Lester Piggott. The best horses he trained were Moorestyle and Never So Bold, both European champion sprinters.

== Major wins ==
- Coronation Cup - (1) - Be My Native (1983)
- International Stakes - (1) - Shady Heights (1988)
- July Cup - (2) - Moorestyle (1980), Never So Bold (1985)
- King's Stand Stakes - (1) - Never So Bold (1985)
- Middle Park Stakes - (1) - Mattaboy (1980)
- Nunthorpe Stakes - (1) - Never So Bold (1985)
- Prix de la Forêt - (2) - Moorestyle (1980, 1981)
- Prix du Moulin de Longchamp - (1) - Sparkler (1973)
- Queen Elizabeth II Stakes - (1) - Maroof (1994)
