= Keen Hunter =

American-bred Thoroughbred racehorse

Keen Hunter was a thoroughbred racehorse sired by Diesis. In 1991, he won the Prix de l'Abbaye de Longchamp at Longchamp Racecourse in Paris at age 4. The next year, he placed second in the race. After his Longchamp victory, Keen Hunter continued to race, ultimately winning six races.
