= Minster Stakes =

Flat horse race in Britain

- Class: Group 2
- Location: York Racecourse; York, England
- Inaugurated: 1968
- Race type: Flat / Thoroughbred
- Sponsor: Clipper Logistics
- Website: York

Race information
- Distance: 6f (1,207 metres)
- Surface: Turf
- Track: Straight
- Qualification: Three-years-old and up
- Weight: 9 st 0 lb (3yo); 9 st 10 lb (4yo+); Allowances; 3 lb for fillies and mares Penalties; 5 lb for Group 1 winners * 3 lb for Group 2 winners * * since 31 August last year
- Purse: £150,000 (2025); 1st: £85,065

1895 Duke of York Stakes
2026
Elmonjed	Kind Of Blue	Regional

Previous years
2025
Inisherin	Flora Of Bermuda	Night Raider
2024
Mill Stream	Shouldvebeenaring	Diligent Harry
2023
Azure Blue	Highfield Princess	Commanche Falls
2022
Highfield Princess	Spycatcher	Minzaal
2021
Starman	Nahaarr	Oxted

2020-2011
2019
Invincible Army	Major Jumbo	Yafta
2018
Harry Angel	Brando	Sir Dancealot
2017
Tasleet	Magical Memory	Comicas
2016
Magical Memory	Suedois	Danzeno
2015
Glass Office	Mattmu	Jack Dexter
2014
Maarek	Astaire	Es Que Love
2013
Society Rock	Lethal Force	Gordon Lord Byron
2012
Tiddliwinks	The Cheka	Society Rock
2011
Delegator	Regal Parade	Tiddliwinks

2010-2001
2010
Prime Defender	Showcasing	Main Aim
2009
Utmost Respect	King's Apostle	Tax Free
2008
Assertive	War Artist	Beckermet
2007
Amadeus Wolf	Red Clubs	Soldier's Tale
2006
Steenberg	Quito	Somnus
2005
The Kiddykid	Steenberg	Welsh Emperor
2004
Monsieur Bond	Steenberg	Arakan
2003
Twilight Blues	Just James	Polar Way
2002
Invincible Spirit	Mugharreb	Lady Dominatrix
2001
Pipalong	Tedburrow	Astonished

2000-1991
2000
Lend A Hand	Pipalong	Bold Edge
1999
Sampower Star	Warningford	Yorkies Boy
1998
Bollin Joanne	Elnadim	Danetime
1997
Royal Applause	Farhana	Blue Duster
1996
Venture Capitalist	Branston Abby	Royale Figurine
1995
Lake Coniston	So Factual	Branston Abby
1994
Owington	Bid For Blue	Master Planner
1993
Hamas	Garah	Montendre
1992
Shalford	Mr Brooks	Amigo Menor
1991
Green Line Express	Nicholas	La Grange Music

1990-1983
1990
Lugana Beach	Great Commotion	Mademoiselle Chloe
1989
Indian Ridge	Gallic League	Nabeel Dancer
1988
Handsome Sailor	Governor General	Wantage Park
1987
Handsome Sailor	Hallgate	Governor General
1986
Grey Desire	Si Signor	Our Dynasty
1985
Chapel Cottage	Grey Desire	Polly Daniels
1984
Gabitat	Vorvados	Keep Tapping
1983
Vorvados	Vaigly Star	Prince Spy

The Minster Stakes (formerly the Duke of York Stakes and 1895 Duke of York Stakes) is a Group 2 flat horse race in Great Britain open to horses aged three years or older. It is run over a distance of 6 furlongs (1,207 metres) at York in May.

== History ==
An event called the Duke of York Stakes was introduced at York's August meeting in 1895. It was named after Prince George, Duke of York (later King George V) A middle-distance race for three-year-olds, its winners included Polymelus (1905), Papyrus (1923) and Firdaussi (1932).

A six-furlong handicap sprint titled the Duke of York Handicap Stakes was established at York's May meeting in 1950. It continued until the mid-1960s.

The current race, a six-furlong conditions race, was created in 1968 as the Duke of York Stakes. The first running was won by Hard Water. It was given Group 3 status in 1971, and promoted to Group 2 level in 2003.

The race was renamed in 2022 to distance it from Prince Andrew, Duke of York, later Andrew Mountbatten-Windsor, who faces allegations of sexual abuse, with the year 1895 added, referencing George V, a former Duke of York and the date the original race was first run. It was renamed again in 2026, taking its present title as an acknowledgment to York Minster.

The Minster Stakes is now held on the opening day of York's three-day Dante Festival meeting. It is run the day before the Dante Stakes.

== Records ==
Most successful horse (2 wins):

- Handsome Sailor – 1987, 1988

Leading jockey (4 wins):

- Lester Piggott – The Brianstan (1971), Steel Heart (1975), Thatching (1979), Vorvados (1983)
- Steve Cauthen – Flash n' Thunder (1980), Jester (1982), Indian Ridge (1989), Lugana Beach (1990)
- Michael Hills – Handsome Sailor (1988), Owington (1994), Royal Applause (1997), Steenberg (2006)

Leading trainer (7 wins):

- Barry Hills – Noble Mark (1974), Flash n' Thunder (1980), Jester (1982), Handsome Sailor (1987, 1988), Royal Applause (1997), Prime Defender (2010)

Leading owner (6 wins):

- Robert Sangster – Noble Mark (1974), Thatching (1979), Flash n' Thunder (1980), Jester (1982), Handsome Sailor (1987, 1988)

== Winners ==
Year	Winner	Age	Jockey	Trainer	Owner	Time
1968	Hard Water	5	Joe Mercer	John Sutcliffe, Jr.	J R Brown	1:21.20
1969	Great Bear	5	Ron Hutchinson	John Dunlop	Lady S Fitzalan-Howard	1:27.00
1970	Fluke	3	George Duffield	John Oxley	Dick Hollingsworth	1:10.80
1971	The Brianstan	4	Lester Piggott	John Sutcliffe, Jr.	S Powell	1:11.80
1972	Stilvi	3	John Gorton	Bruce Hobbs	G Cambanis	1:10.40
1973	Abwah	4	Geoff Lewis	Noel Murless	Louis Freedman	1:10.80
1974	Noble Mark	3	Willie Carson	Barry Hills	Robert Sangster	1:11.33
1975	Steel Heart	3	Lester Piggott	Dermot Weld	Ravi Tikkoo	1:16.01
1976	Three Legs	4	Gianfranco Dettori	Luca Cumani	M Boffa	1:16.18
1977	Boldboy	7	Willie Carson	Dick Hern	Lady Beaverbrook	1:13.84
1978	Private Line	3	Edward Hide	Clive Brittain	G Greenwood	1:13.85
1979	Thatching	4	Lester Piggott	Vincent O'Brien	Robert Sangster	1:13.10
1980	Flash n' Thunder	3	Steve Cauthen	Barry Hills	Robert Sangster	1:10.40
1981	King of Spain	5	Paul Cook	Peter Cundell	Avon Industries Ltd	1:14.65
1982	Jester	3	Steve Cauthen	Barry Hills	Robert Sangster	1:10.61
1983	Vorvados	6	Lester Piggott	Michael Haynes	Miss F Gallichan	1:19.91
1984	Gabitat	6	Bob Curant	Brian Gubby	Brian Gubby Ltd	1:11.76
1985	Chapel Cottage	4	Philip Robinson	Mick Ryan	Terry Ramsden	1:13.65
1986	Grey Desire	6	Kevin Darley	Mel Brittain	Mel Brittain	1:18.23
1987	Handsome Sailor	4	Cash Asmussen	Barry Hills	Robert Sangster	1:12.58
1988	Handsome Sailor	5	Michael Hills	Barry Hills	Robert Sangster	1:12.73
1989	Indian Ridge	4	Steve Cauthen	David Elsworth	Mrs A Coughlan	1:10.17
1990	Lugana Beach	4	Steve Cauthen	David Elsworth	Ray Richards	1:11.74
1991	Green Line Express	5	Tony Cruz	Mohammed Moubarak	Ecurie Fustok	1:11.33
1992	Shalford	4	Michael Roberts	Richard Hannon Sr.	D F Cock	1:08.82
1993	Hamas	4	Willie Carson	Peter Walwyn	Hamdan Al Maktoum	1:12.22
1994	Owington	3	Michael Hills	Geoff Wragg	Baron Georg von Ullman	1:10.23
1995	Lake Coniston	4	Pat Eddery	Geoff Lewis	Highclere Thoroughbred Racing	1:11.52
1996	Venture Capitalist	7	Ray Cochrane	David Nicholls	W G Swiers	1:11.72
1997	Royal Applause	4	Michael Hills	Barry Hills	Maktoum Al Maktoum	1:12.13
1998	Bollin Joanne	5	Kieren Fallon	Tim Easterby	Late Lady Westbrook	1:10.91
1999	Sampower Star	3	Richard Hughes	Richard Hannon Sr.	Sampower Racing Club	1:12.59
2000	Lend a Hand	5	Frankie Dettori	Saeed bin Suroor	Godolphin	1:10.77
2001	Pipalong	5	Kevin Darley	Tim Easterby	T H Bennett	1:11.20
2002	Invincible Spirit	5	Michael Kinane	John Dunlop	Prince A A Faisal	1:09.55
2003	Twilight Blues	4	Pat Smullen	Brian Meehan	Susan Roy	1:10.79
2004	Monsieur Bond	4	Fergal Lynch	Bryan Smart	R C Bond	1:16.39
2005	The Kiddykid	5	Jamie Spencer	David Evans	Claire Massey	1:15.93
2006	Steenberg	7	Michael Hills	Mark Tompkins	Kenneth Macpherson	1:12.54
2007	Amadeus Wolf	4	Neil Callan	Kevin Ryan	Duddy / McDonald / Heeney / INS	1:10.20
2008	Assertive	5	Ryan Moore	Richard Hannon Sr.	Lady Whent	1:10.71
2009	Utmost Respect	5	Paul Hanagan	Richard Fahey	Rumpole Partnership	1:10.70
2010	Prime Defender	6	Robert Winston	Barry Hills	Falle / Franklin / Sumsion	1:11.19
2011	Delegator	5	Frankie Dettori	Saeed bin Suroor	Godolphin	1:10.18
2012	Tiddliwinks	6	Jamie Spencer	Kevin Ryan	Exors of Guy Reed	1:12.96
2013	Society Rock	6	Kieren Fallon	James Fanshawe	Simon Gibson	1:11.44
2014	Maarek	7	Declan McDonogh	Evanna McCutcheon	Lisbunny Synd	1:13.53
2015	Glass Office	5	Jim Crowley	David Simcock	Fitri Hay	1:10.65
2016	Magical Memory	4	Frankie Dettori	Charlie Hills	Kennet Valley Tbreds	1:10.52
2017	Tasleet	4	Jim Crowley	William Haggas	Hamdan Al Maktoum	1:12.74
2018	Harry Angel	4	Adam Kirby	Clive Cox	Godolphin	1:10.87
2019	Invincible Army	4	P. J. McDonald	James Tate	Saeed Manana	1:09.90
	no race 2020 (Note: The 2020 running was cancelled because of the COVID-19 pandemic in the United Kingdom)
2021	Starman	4	Oisin Murphy	Ed Walker	David Ward	1:11.24
2022	Highfield Princess	5	Jason Hart	John Quinn	Trainers House Enterprises Ltd	1:10.62
2023	Azure Blue	4	Paul Mulrennan	Michael Dods	P Appleton & Mrs Anne Elliott	1:09.11
2024	Mill Stream	4	William Buick	Jane Chapple-Hyam	Peter Harris	1:10.91
2025	Inisherin	4	Ryan Moore	Kevin Ryan	Sheikh Mohammed Obaid Al Maktoum	1:10.67
2026	Elmonjed	5	William Buick	William Haggas	Shadwell	1:11.88

== See also ==
- Horse racing in Great Britain
- List of British flat horse races
