= Paul Cook (jockey) =

English jockey (born 1946)

Personal information
- Born: 12 April 1946 (age 80) Cheltenham, England
- Occupation: Jockey
- Height: 5 ft 5 in (165 cm)

Horse racing career
- Sport: Horse racing

Major racing wins
- British Classic Races: St Leger Stakes (1982); 1000 Guineas Stakes (1966); Other major races: Irish St. Leger (1982); Preis der Diana (1978); Prix de l'Abbaye de Longchamp (1977); Queen Elizabeth II Jubilee Stakes (1976); July Cup (1977)

Racing awards
- British flat racing Champion Apprentice (1964, 1965)

Significant horses
- Gentilhombre, Glad Rags, Touching Wood, Trient
- Updated on 21 October 2023

Paul Cook is a retired Classic-winning jockey, who won two British Classics and was twice British flat racing Champion Apprentice.

== Career ==
Paul Allan Cook was born in Cheltenham on 12 April 1946. Aged 14, on the advice of his local butcher, he wrote to trainer Frenchie Nicholson asking for a job at his stable. There was no vacancy at the time, but he was allowed to help out in the school holidays, even though he was too young and small to ride. He cycled to the stables and was given a few shillings a week as pocket money by Nicholson. After a year of work in the yard, he was allowed to ride the stable pony and an old steeplechaser called Desert Fort, and shortly after turning 15 he signed on as an apprentice. The trainer's son, David Nicholson trained him to ride.

Nicholson senior bought two horses, Tenor and Balle d'Or, for Cook to ride in races and he made his racing debut on the latter in July 1962. His first win was awarded in the stewards' room after an objection at Warwick on 9 September 1963. On 6 May 1964, while still an apprentice, he finished fast on the Paddy Prendergast trained Credo to win the Chester Cup, just ahead of Scobie Breasley on Utrillo. Prendergast called him "the best apprentice I have ever seen" and used him in the Irish Classics of 1965. He went on to become British flat racing Champion Apprentice in both 1964 and 1965 and even two decades later he was referred to as "one of the outstanding apprentices since the Second World War".

On completing his apprenticeship, he became first jockey to Jack Jarvis in Newmarket. He also regularly rode for Bruce Hobbs. During this period, he won the first of two British Classics - the 1966 1,000 Guineas on Vincent O'Brien's Glad Rags. He also came close to winning the Derby on 9/2 joint favourite, Pretendre, for Jarvis, losing out narrowly to Scobie Breasley on Charlottown. In 1966, he had 93 winners.

The partnership with Jarvis only lasted two seasons, and in 1968, his career deteriorated after going freelance. He did ride a winner for the Queen in 1969 but in 1970, he only rode nine winners.

He still had big wins throughout the 1970s - he won the 1972 Stewards' Cup on Touch Paper, the 1973 edition on Alphadamus, the 1973 Ascot Stakes on Full Of Beans, the 1975 July Stakes on Super Cavalier, the 1975 Newbury Autumn Cup on Coed Cochion and, with sprinter Gentilhombre he won the 1977 July Cup, Diadem Stakes and Prix de l'Abbaye de Longchamp.

On 4 July 1981, he had the rare distinction of winning at three different courses in less than six hours - the 2:15 at Sandown, the 5:00 at Bath and Nottingham.

His final major success came with Touching Wood in 1982, on whom he came second in the Derby and went on to win both the English and Irish St Legers. That same year, he was runner-up in the Oaks on Slightly Dangerous.

Western Dancer was another late career success - winning the 1985 Ebor Handicap and 1986 Chester Cup. He also won several important races abroad during his career, including the Calcutta Derby and the German and Norwegian Oaks.

Retirement was forced on him by an accident in Doncaster's Portland Handicap in 1989. He was riding Madraco, when the horse fell, bringing down two others - Pendor Dancer, ridden by Ian Johnson, and Tolo, ridden by Ray Cochrane. Cochrane broke his collarbone, but Cook and Johnson suffered career-ending injuries. Cook broke ribs and fractured his collarbone, thumb and foot and he lost his nerve for race-riding. In 1993, he was awarded £352,000 in compensation for the incident. It was adjudged that Madraco put his foot in a hole left by unsatisfactorily completed drainage work and the riders had effectively playing "Russian roulette" by running over it. He had always intended to ride to the age of 50 like Joe Mercer, but was retiring aged 44. In total, he had ridden over 1,500 winners worldwide.

On retirement, he became a part-time race-reader for the Press Association, ran a small stud with his wife and supported his daughter Aimee's riding career. He was also president of the Jockeys' Association.

== Personal life ==
He married Carol Anne on 4 February 1969 and lives in Newbury. His hobbies include hunting, golf and fishing.

== Style ==
He was not a natural jockey and took a long time to learn the basics. Frenchie Nicholson's wife, Diana, said that he was "like a frog" and would get cramp from riding with his stirrups too short. "His hands would get further and further forward and his legs would slip further and further backwards!" Cook himself admitted to a lack of strength.

== Major wins ==
(United Kingdom) Great Britain

- St Leger Stakes - Touching Wood (1982)
- Queen Elizabeth II Jubilee Stakes - Gentilhombre (1976)
- July Cup - Gentilhombre (1977)
- 1000 Guineas Stakes - Glad Rags (1966)

(Republic of Ireland) Ireland

- Irish St. Leger - Touching Wood (1982)

France

- Prix de l'Abbaye de Longchamp - Gentilhombre (1977)

Germany

- Preis der Diana - Trient (1978)

== See also ==
- List of jockeys

== Bibliography ==
- Wright, Howard (1986). The Encyclopaedia of British Racing. London: Robert Hale Ltd. ISBN 0-7090-2639-0.
- Tanner, Michael; Cranham, Gerry (1992). Great Jockeys of the Flat. Enfield, Middlesex: Guinness Publishing. ISBN 0-85112-989-7.
