= Queen Elizabeth II Jubilee Stakes =

Flat horse race in Great Britain

- Class: Group 1
- Location: Ascot Racecourse; Ascot, England
- Inaugurated: 1868
- Race type: Flat / Thoroughbred
- Website: Ascot

Race information
- Distance: 6f (1,207 metres)
- Surface: Turf
- Track: Straight
- Qualification: Four-years-old and up (Southern Hemisphere 3yo allowed)
- Weight: 9 stone 5 lb Allowances; 3 lb for fillies and mares
- Purse: £1,000,000 (2025); 1st: £567,100
- Bonuses: see Global Sprint Challenge

Diamond Jubilee Stakes
2026
Almeraq	Satono Reve	Joliestar

Previous years
2025
Lazzat	Satono Reve	Flora Of Bermuda
2024
Khaadem	Swingalong	Mill Stream
2023
Khaadem	Sacred	Highfield Princess
2022
Naval Crown	Creative Force	Campanelle
2021
Dream Of Dreams	Glen Shiel	Art Power

2020-2011
2020
Hello Youmzain	Dream Of Dreams	Sceptical
2019
Blue Point	Dream Of Dreams	Kachy
2018
Merchant Navy	City Light	Bound For Nowhere
2017
The Tin Man	Tasleet	Limato
2016
Twilight Son	Gold-Fun	Signs Of Blessing
2015
Undrafted	Brazen Beau	Astaire
2014
Slade Power	Due Diligence	Aljamaaheer
2013
Lethal Force	Society Rock	Krypton Factor
2012
Black Caviar	Moonlight Cloud	Restiadargent
2011
Society Rock	Monsieur Chevalier	Star Witness

2010-2001
2010
Starspangledbanner	Society Rock	Kinsale King
2009
Art Connoisseur	Cannonball	Lesson In Humility
2008
Kingsgate Native	War Artist	Sir Gerry
2007
Soldier's Tale	Takeover Target	Asset
2006
Les Arcs	Balthazaar's Gift	Takeover Target
2005
Cape Of Good Hope	Galeota	Balmont
2004
Fayr Jag	Crystal Castle	Cape Of Good Hope
2003
Choisir	Airwave	Baron's Pit
2002
Malhub	Danehurst	Three Points
2001
Harmonic Way	Three Points	Freud

2000-1991
2000
Superior Premium	Sampower Star	Lend A Hand
1999
Bold Edge	Russian Revival	Vision of Night
1998
Tomba	Dyhim Diamond	Andreyev
1997
Royal Applause	Blue Goblin	Catch The Blues
1996
Atraf	Catch The Blues	Watch Me
1995
So Factual	Lake Coniston	Nuriva
1994
Owington	So Factual	Catrail
1993
College Chapel	Keen Hunter	Dolphin Street
1992
Shalford	Amigo Menor	Spanish Storm
1991
Polish Patriot	Chicarica	Montendre

1990-1988
1990
Great Commotion	Dead Certain	La Grange Music
1989
Danehill	Nabeel Dancer	Savahra Sound
1988
Posada	Wing Park	Point Of Light

The Queen Elizabeth II Jubilee Stakes is a Group 1 flat horse race in Great Britain open to horses aged four years or older. Three-year-olds foaled in the Southern Hemisphere are also eligible. It is run at Ascot over a distance of 6 furlongs (1,207 metres), and it is scheduled to take place each year in June.

== History ==
The event was established in 1868, and it was originally called the All-Aged Stakes. It was renamed the Cork and Orrery Stakes in 1926, in honour of the 9th Earl of Cork, who served as the Master of the Buckhounds in the 19th century.

The present system of race grading was introduced in 1971, and the Cork and Orrery Stakes was initially classed at Group 3 level. It was promoted to Group 2 status in 1998.

The race was renamed to commemorate the Golden Jubilee of Queen Elizabeth II in 2002. From this point it held Group 1 status. In 2012 the race was named the Diamond Jubilee Stakes, to commemorate the Queen's Diamond Jubilee and in 2022 it was again renamed to the Platinum Jubilee Stakes, to commemorate the Queen's Platinum Jubilee. In 2023 the race was given its present title, to honour the memory of the Queen and retain the connection with the three jubilees celebrated since 2002.

The Platinum Jubilee Stakes became part of a new international race series, the Global Sprint Challenge, in 2005.

The race is now contested on the final day of the five-day Royal Ascot meeting. Prior to 2015 the race was also open to three-year-olds. It was restricted to four-year-olds and up when a new six furlong Group One race, the Commonwealth Cup, was created at the meeting for three-year-olds only in 2015.

== Records ==
Most successful horse (3 wins):

- Prince Charlie – 1872, 1873, 1874

Leading jockey (9 wins):

- Lester Piggott – Right Boy (1958, 1959), Tin Whistle (1960), El Gallo (1963), Mountain Call (1968), Welsh Saint (1970), Saritamer (1974), Thatching (1979), College Chapel (1993)

Leading trainer (5 wins):

- Vincent O'Brien – Welsh Saint (1970), Saritamer (1974), Swingtime (1975), Thatching (1979), College Chapel (1993)

Leading owner (3 wins):

- Joseph Dawson – Prince Charlie (1872, 1873, 1874)
- Jack Joel – Sunflower II (1912), Hamlet (1923, 1924)

== Winners since 1900 ==
Year	Winner	Age	Jockey	Trainer	Owner	Time
1900	Nattie	3	Otto Madden	James Waugh	Mr Russel
1901	Bridge	5	Kempton Cannon	Davies	Mr A M Singer
1902	Reine des Fleurs	4	Johnny Reiff	M Maurice Caillault	M Maurice Caillault	1:20.40
1903	Lord Bobs	5	William Lane	William Waugh	Sir J Blundell Maple
1904	Cossack	6	Danny Maher	George Blackwell	Sir J Miller
1905	Delaunay	4	Otto Madden	Peter Gilpin	Peter Gilpin
1906	Queen's Holiday (Note: The 1906 race was a walkover.)	5	Bernard Dillon	Fallon	Captain F Forester
1907	Rocketter	4	Billy Higgs	Sam Darling	Captain Greer
1908	Llangwm	3	Danny Maher	Frank Hartigan	Mr A B Walker
1909	Hillside III	3	Skeets Martin	Jack Joyner	Mr Whitney
1910	New Castle II	3	Skeets Martin	Jack Joyner	Mr Whitney
1911	Golden Rod	5	Danny Maher	Samuel Pickering	Mr P Nelke
1912	Sunflower II	6	Frank Wootton	Charles Morton	Mr J B Joel
1913	Hornet's Beauty	5	Skeets Martin	Felix Leach	Sir W Cooke	1:20.40
1914	Hornet's Beauty	6	Freddie Fox	Charles Elsey	Sir W Cooke
1915–18	No Race
1919	Freesia	4	Fred Templeman	Alf Sadler Sr.	Lord Jersey
1920	Diadem	6	Steve Donoghue	George Lambton	Lord D'Abernon
1921	Tete-a-Tete	4	Izaak Strydom	Robert Sherwood Jr.	Lord Furness	1:15.60
1922	Pharmacie	4	Steve Donoghue	Harry Cottrill	Mr J White
1923	Hamlet	5	Steve Donoghue	Charles Morton	Mr J B Joel
1924	Hamlet	6	Steve Donoghue	Charles Morton	Mr J B Joel	1:20.80
1925	Drake	5	Bobby Dick	Harry Cottrill	Mrs S Whitburn	1:16.80
1926	Diomedes	4	Jack Leach	Harvey Leader	Mr S W Beer	1:20.00
1927	Highborn II	3	Harry Beasley Jr.	Ossie Bell	Sir H Cunliffe-Owen	1:18.80
1928	Zaretta	3	Harry Wragg	Major Vanda Beatty	Major Beatty	1:18.60
1929	Royal Minstrel	4	Joe Childs	Cecil Boyd-Rochfort	Mr J H Whitney
1930	Costaki Pasha	4	Michael Beary	Richard Dawson	Aga Khan III	1:17.80
1931	Grindleton	3	Harry Beasley Jr.	Len Cundell	Mr J W Sharples	1:18.80
1932	Slipper	6	Richard Perryman	Frank Butters	Sir A Butt	1:15.40
1933	The Divot	4	Bobby Dick	Alfred Stedall	Major C Blundell	1:17.00
1934	Solenoid	5	Joseph Caldwell	Harry Cottrill	Mrs J V Rank	1:16.60
1935	Winandermere	3	Steve Donoghue	Len Cundell	Mrs G Glorney	1:21.20
1936	Bellacose	4	Rufus Beasley	Jack Colling	P Dunne	1:16.60
1937	Pherozshah	3	Doug Smith	Frank Butters	Aga Khan III	1:16.80
1938	Ipsden	5	Sam Wragg	Ossie Bell	Lady Ludlow	1:16.40
1939	Old Reliance	4	Eph Smith	Jack Jarvis	Jack Jarvis	1:16.20
1940–45	No Race
1946	Honeyway	5	Eph Smith	Jack Jarvis	Lord Milford	1:18.60
1947	The Bug	4	Charlie Smirke	Marcus Marsh	N H Wachman	1:18.40
1948	Delerium	3	Charlie Smirke	Jack Leach	J T Coltman	1:19.00
1949	Solonaway	3	Sir Gordon Richards	Michael Collins	R A Duggan	1:16.40
1950	Abadan	3	Sir Gordon Richards	Hubert Hartigan	Lieutenant Colonel Giles Loder	1:20.00
1951	Bob Cherry	4	Neville Sellwood	Atty Persse	Lord Sefton	1:17.80
1952	Royal Serenade	4	Manny Mercer	Harry Wragg	G M Bell	1:17.80
1953	Blood Test	3	Sir Gordon Richards	Noel Murless	Lieutenant Colonel Giles Loder	1:18.80
1954	Key	3	Sir Gordon Richards	Noel Murless	Mrs D M FitzPatrick	1:20.40
1955	Trouville	3	Bill Rickaby	William Smyth	Lady Waterford	1:16.94
1956	Grass Court	4	Bill Elliott	Ken Cundell	Mrs C Evans	1:17.75
1957	Matador	4	Eph Smith	John Waugh	Stanhope Joel	1:14.35
1958	Right Boy	4	Lester Piggott	Bill Dutton	Geoffrey Gilbert	1:16.11
1959	Right Boy	5	Lester Piggott	Pat Rohan	Geoffrey Gilbert	1:14.52
1960	Tin Whistle	3	Lester Piggott	Pat Rohan	B W Grainger	1:17.66
1961	Bun Penny	3	Doug Smith	Brud Fetherstonhaugh	Stanhope Joel	1:16.32
1962	Compensation	3	Jimmy Lindley	Ted Lambton	Mrs G Lambton	1:15.72
1963	El Gallo	4	Lester Piggott	Noel Murless	Charles St George	1:21.73
1964	Abandoned due to waterlogging
1965	Majority Blue	4	Bill Williamson	John Oxx	Mrs B Aitken	1:18.11
1966	Current Coin	3	Johnny Roe	John Oxx	Hugh Leggot	1:17.06
1967	Siliconn	5	George Moore	Atty Corbett	Conn Pollock	1:15.55
1968	Mountain Call	3	Lester Piggott	Bernard van Cutsem	I E Kornberg	1:15.97
1969	Tudor Music	3	Frankie Durr	Michael Jarvis	David Robinson	1:17.44
1970	Welsh Saint	4	Lester Piggott	Vincent O'Brien	J P Philipps	1:15.40
1971	King's Company	3	Freddy Head	Willie Robinson	B. Firestone	1:21.70
1972	Parsimony	3	Willie Carson	Fulke Johnson Houghton	E. Holland-Martin	1:18.16
1973	Balliol	4	Brian Taylor	John Winter	Daniel Prenn	1:18.56
1974	Saritamer	3	Lester Piggott	Vincent O'Brien	Charles St George	1:13.94
1975	Swingtime	3	Willie Carson	Vincent O'Brien	John A. Mulcahy	1:15.42
1976	Gentilhombre	3	Paul Cook	Neil Adam	T. Robson	1:14.75
1977	He Loves Me	3	Joe Mercer	Jeremy Hindley	J. Allbritton	1:16.70
1978	Sweet Mint	4	Wally Swinburn	Noel Meade	M. Wright	1:16.66
1979	Thatching	4	Lester Piggott	Vincent O'Brien	Robert Sangster	1:15.39
1980	Kearney	3	Walter Swinburn	Willie Robinson	Mrs Dermot McGillycuddy	1:16.36
1981	The Quiet Bidder	3	Walter Swinburn	Reg Hollinshead	Heathavon Stables	1:14.64
1982	Indian King	4	Greville Starkey	Guy Harwood	J. Levy	1:13.29
1983	Sylvan Barbarosa	4	Brian Rouse	Philip Mitchell	Johnson / Wade	1:14.16
1984	Committed	4	Brent Thomson	Dermot Weld	Robert Sangster	1:14.12
1985	Dafayna	3	Willie Carson	Michael Stoute	HH Aga Khan IV	1:13.55
1986	Sperry	3	Paul Eddery	Peter Walwyn	Yahya Nasib	1:13.21
1987	Big Shuffle	3	Michael Kinane	Dermot Weld	Moyglare Stud Farm	1:18.57
1988	Posada	3	Michael Roberts	Fulke Johnson Houghton	Tim Holland-Martin	1:13.20
1989	Danehill	3	Willie Carson	Jeremy Tree	Khalid Abdullah	1:12.95
1990	Great Commotion	4	Pat Eddery	Alex Scott	Maktoum Al Maktoum	1:14.42
1991	Polish Patriot	3	Ray Cochrane	Guy Harwood	Dick Kirstein	1:13.73
1992	Shalford	4	Michael Roberts	Richard Hannon Sr.	D. F. Cock	1:12.53
1993	College Chapel	3	Lester Piggott	Vincent O'Brien	Jacqueline O'Brien	1:19.15
1994	Owington	3	Michael Hills	Geoff Wragg	Baron G. von Ullmann	1:13.18
1995	So Factual	5	Frankie Dettori	Saeed bin Suroor	Godolphin	1:12.99
1996	Atraf	3	Willie Carson	David Morley	Hamdan Al Maktoum	1:14.07
1997	Royal Applause	4	Michael Hills	Barry Hills	Maktoum Al Maktoum	1:15.33
1998	Tomba	4	Michael Tebbutt	Brian Meehan	John Good	1:16.99
1999	Bold Edge	4	Dane O'Neill	Richard Hannon Sr.	Lady Whent & Friends	1:13.80
2000	Superior Premium	6	Johnny Murtagh	Richard Fahey	Jim Parsons	1:14.83
2001	Harmonic Way	6	Steve Drowne	Roger Charlton	Alexandra Chandris	1:13.45
2002	Malhub	4	Kevin Darley	John Gosden	Hamdan Al Maktoum	1:14.34
2003	Choisir	4	Johnny Murtagh	Paul Perry	Terry Wallace & Partners	1:12.23
2004	Fayr Jag	5	Willie Supple	Tim Easterby	Jonathan Gill	1:13.35
2005 (Note: The 2005 running took place at York)	Cape of Good Hope	7	Michael Kinane	David Oughton	Exors of Ron Carstairs	1:08.58
2006	Les Arcs	6	John Egan	Tim Pitt	Willie McKay	1:13.12
2007	Soldier's Tale	6	Johnny Murtagh	Jeremy Noseda	Budget Stable	1:14.51
2008	Kingsgate Native	3	Seb Sanders	John Best	John Mayne	1:13.33
2009	Art Connoisseur	3	Tom Queally	Michael Bell	Richard Green	1:14.90
2010	Starspangledbanner	4	Johnny Murtagh	Aidan O'Brien	Michael Tabor et al.	1:12.57
2011	Society Rock	4	Pat Cosgrave	James Fanshawe	Simon Gibson	1:17.22
2012	Black Caviar	5	Luke Nolen	Peter Moody	G. J. Wilkie, K. J. Wilkie et al	1:14.10
2013	Lethal Force	4	Adam Kirby	Clive Cox	Alan G. Craddock	1:13.36
2014	Slade Power	5	Wayne Lordan	Edward Lynam	Sabena Power	1:12.40
2015	Undrafted	5	Frankie Dettori	Wesley Ward	Wes Welker & Sol Kumin	1:12.69
2016	Twilight Son	4	Ryan Moore	Henry Candy	Godfrey Wilson & Cheveley Park Stud	1:13.84
2017	The Tin Man	5	Tom Queally	James Fanshawe	Fred Archer Racing - Ormonde	1:12.02
2018	Merchant Navy	3	Ryan Moore	Aidan O'Brien	Merchant Navy Synd, Tabor, Smith, Magnier	1:12.09
2019	Blue Point	5	James Doyle	Charlie Appleby	Godolphin	1:11.42
2020	Hello Youmzain	4	Kevin Stott	Kevin Ryan	Haras d'Etreham and Cambridge Stud	1:13.42
2021	Dream of Dreams	7	Ryan Moore	Sir Michael Stoute	Saeed Suhail	1:14.87
2022	Naval Crown	4	James Doyle	Charlie Appleby	Godolphin	1:12.17
2023	Khaadem	7	Jamie Spencer	Charles Hills	Mrs Fitri Hay	1:12.42
2024	Khaadem	8	Oisin Murphy	Charles Hills	Mrs Fitri Hay	1:12.25
2025	Lazzat	4	James Doyle	Jerome Reynier	Wathnan Racing	1:11.30
2026	Almeraq	4	Tom Marquand	William Haggas	Shadwell Estate	1:11.82

== Earlier winners ==
=== As the All-Aged Stakes ===
- 1868: Laneret
- 1869: no race
- 1870: Normanby
- 1871: Cymbal
- 1872: Prince Charlie
- 1873: Prince Charlie
- 1874: Prince Charlie
- 1875: Lowlander
- 1876: Lowlander
- 1877: Ecossais
- 1878: Trappist
- 1879: Hackthorpe
- 1880: Valentino
- 1881: Charibert
- 1882: Marden
- 1883: Despair
- 1884: Geheimniss
- 1885: Energy
- 1886: Whitefriar
- 1887: Whitefriar
- 1888: Deuce of Clubs
- 1889: Napoleon
- 1890: Mephisto
- 1891: Bel Demonio
- 1892: Peter Flower
- 1893: Schemer
- 1894: Northshampton
- 1895: Grey Leg
- 1896: Speed
- 1897: Red Heart
- 1898: St Lucia
- 1899: Oria

== See also ==
- Horse racing in Great Britain
- List of British flat horse races
- Recurring sporting events established in 1868 – this race is included under its original title, All-Aged Stakes.
