= Handsome Sailor =

British-bred Thoroughbred racehorse

- Sire: Some Hand
- Grandsire: Will Somers
- Dam: Found At Sea
- Damsire: Pieces of Eight
- Sex: Stallion
- Foaled: 30 April 1983
- Country: United Kingdom
- Colour: Chestnut
- Breeder: Hugh Craig Harvey
- Owner: Robert Sangster
- Trainer: R Thompson; Michael W. Dickinson; Barry Hills
- Record: 34:12-1-7

Major wins
- Duke of York Stakes (1987, 1988); Prix de Ris-Orangis (1987); Temple Stakes (1988); William Hill Sprint Championship (1988); Prix de l'Abbaye (1988); Flying Five (1989)

Handsome Sailor (30 April 1983 – 1997) was a British Thoroughbred racehorse and sire. A specialist sprinter, he showed useful, but unremarkable form in his first two seasons, winning three of his nine starts as a juvenile and two from four in an abbreviated three-year-old campaign. He emerged as a top-class performer in 1987, winning the Duke of York Stakes in England and the Prix de Ris-Orangis in France. He was even better as a five-year-old, winning a second Duke of York Stakes and adding victories in the Temple Stakes, William Hill Sprint Championship and Prix de l'Abbaye. His form was less impressive in 1989 but ended his racing career with a victory in the Flying Five. He was not a success as a breeding stallion and died in 1997 at the age of fourteen.

== Background ==
Handsome Sailor was a "big, lengthy" chestnut horse with a small white star and white socks on his front feet bred in England by Hugh Craig Harvey. He was the best horse sired by Some Hand, a sprinter who won five races included the 1972 edition of the Prix de Meautry. Handsome Sailor's dam Found At Sea won two minor races in North America. She was descended from the broodmare Flota, who produced Sailor II and was a full-sister to the CCA Oaks winner High Fleet.

== Racing career ==
=== 1985: two-year-old season ===
Early in 1985 the colt was sent to the Doncaster sale where he was sold for 3,600 guineas and joined the stable of R. Thompson.

Handsome Sailor began his racing career by finishing unplaced in a five furlong selling race but then made steady improvement throughout the year. After winning a maiden race at Windsor Racecourse on his fourth appearance he began to compete in nurseries (handicap races for two-year-olds). He won at Newcastle Racecourse in August and Haydock Park in October. On his final appearance of the year he was narrowly beaten by the filly Catherine's Well when carrying 130 pounds at Doncaster Racecourse in November. He ended the year with a record of three wins, one second and one third place from nine starts. The independent Timeform organisation gave him a rating of 111, twenty-one pounds behind their top-rated juvenile Huntingdale and described him as a "genuine" colt who was very well suited by soft ground.

At the end of the year the colt was bought privately by Robert Sangster and was sent to Michael W. Dickinson's stable at Manton, Wiltshire. Sangster reportedly intended that Handsome Sailor would act as a lead horse in training gallops for the yard's more highly regarded horses.

=== 1986: three-year-old season ===
Handsome Sailor took a long time to reach peak fitness in 1986 and did not appear on the racecourse until August. After being beaten on his first two starts he won a weight-for-age race over five furlongs at Beverley Racecourse in September. On his fourth and final run as a three-year-old he won a handicap over six furlongs at York Racecourse in October. He sustained a pastern injury in the race which ruled him out for the rest of the season. Timeform felt that he had not lived up to his juvenile form and rated him at 102.

At the end of the year Dickinson ceased to train for Sangster, with Barry Hills moving from Lambourn to take over the Manton stable.

=== 1987: four-year-old season ===
On his first appearance as a four-year-old Handsome Sailor finished third to the David Elsworth-trained Governor General in the Abernant Stakes over six furlongs at Newmarket in April. In May he was ridden by Cash Asmussen when he started a 14/1 outsider for the Group Three Duke of York Stakes. Governor General was again in opposition as well as Hallgate, who started favourite after winning the Palace House Stakes. In a change of tactics, Handsome Sailor was sent to the front soon after the start and stayed on well to win by two lengths and a neck from Hallgate and Governor General.

At Royal Ascot in June Handsome Sailor contested the Cork and Orrery Stakes and finished third behind Big Shuffle and Ongoing Situation. In July the colt was sent to France Prix de Ris-Orangis over 1200 metres at Évry Racecourse and started second favourite behind the French filly Tenue de Soiree. Ridden by the Australian jockey Ron Quinton, Handsome Sailor lead for most of the way and rallied after being headed in the closing stages to win by three quarters of a length from Tenue de Soiree. He returned to France for the Prix Maurice de Gheest at Deauville Racecourse in August but after leading with 400 metres left to run he finished fourth behind the British-trained filly Interval.

Handsome Sailor ran twice in the autumn and was well-beaten on both occasions. In the Haydock Sprint Cup on 5 September he was ridden by his trainer's son Michael Hills and finished third behind Ajdal and Sharp Romance, with Interval in fifth. On his final appearance of the season he ran disappointingly when unplaced behind Dowsing in the Diadem Stakes. Timeform gave him an end-of-year rating of 117, thirteen pounds behind their top-sprinter Ajdal. In the official International Classification he was rated the second best older sprinter in Europe two pounds behind Hallgate.

=== 1988: five-year-old season ===
In 1998 Handsome Sailor was ridden in all of his races by Michael Hills. He began his campaign by finishing third to Dawn's Delight and Cragside in the Cammidge Trophy at Doncaster on 26 March before attempting to repeat his 1987 success in the Duke of York Stakes. He started the 5/1 third favourite behind Governor General and Dowsing in a field which also included Dawn's Delight and Cragside. After being restrained by Hills in the early stages Handsome Sailor finished strongly to overtake Governor General in the final furlong to win by half a length with a gap of five lengths back to the filly Wantage Park in third. Eighteen days later he was brought back in distance for the Temple Stakes over five furlongs at Sandown Park Racecourse and started 7/2 second favourite behind the Palace House Stakes winner Perion. He took the lead two furlongs out and drew away in the closing stages to win by three lengths from Perion.

For the second year in succession, Handsome Sailor was beaten in the Cork & Orrery Stakes at Ascot in June, finishing sixth behind the three-year-old filly Posada. In the following month he contested the Group One July Cup at Newmarket and finished third behind Soviet Star and Big Shuffle. On 18 August at York Handsome Sailor was one of twelve horses to contest the Group One William Hill Sprint Championship and started the 5/2 favourite ahead of Perion and the three-year-old filly Silver Fling (winner of the King George Stakes). The other runners included Cadeaux Genereux, Gallic League, Colmore Row (Norfolk Stakes) and Rotherfield Greys (Stewards' Cup). Handsome Sailor was amongst the leaders from the start, went to the front a furlong and a half from the finish and stayed on to win by one and a half lengths from Silver Fling with Perion a head away in third.

Handsome Sailor's next race was the Sprint Cup at Haydock Park on 3 September. Racing over six furlongs on heavy ground he led till half way before fading to finish fifth of the ten runners behind Dowsing. For his final European start of the season, the horse was sent to France for the Group One Prix de l'Abbaye over 1000 metres at Longchamp Racecourse on 2 October. His eight opponents included Big Shuffle, Cadeaux Genereux, Silver Fling, Sharp Romance, Caerwent (International Stakes), Bluebook (Prix de Seine-et-Oise) and La Grande Epoque (runner-up in the race in 1987). Handsome Sailor took the lead from the start but was overtaken 200 metres from the finish and beaten into second place by Cadeaux Genereux. The local stewards however, found that the "winner" had caused interference in the early stages: Cadeaux Genereux was disqualified and the race awarded to Handsome Sailor. Three weeks later the horse was sent to the United States for the Laurel Dash over six furlongs at Laurel Park Racecourse but made little impact, finishing fifth behind Steinlen.

=== 1989: six-year-old season ===
Handsome Sailor remained in training as a six-year-old and began his fifth campaign by finishing fourth to Silver Fling in the Cammidge Trophy. His form then appeared to deteriorate: he finished ninth behind Indian Ridge when attempting to win a third Duke of York Stakes, tenth behind the same horse in the King's Stand Stakes and tenth behind Cadeaux Genereux in the July Cup. In September he was sent to Ireland and dropped slightly in class for the Group Three Flying Five at Phoenix Park Racecourse. Starting at odds of 5/1 he got the better of a prolonged struggle with the Mark Prescott-trained filly Teeming Shore to win by a head, with a gap of three lengths back to Regal Peace. Having completed his racing career with a victory, Handsome Sailor was retired at the end of the year.

== Stud record ==
Handsome Sailor was retired from racing to become a breeding stallion but struggled to attract high-quality mares. He sired some minor winners but made little impact before dying in 1997 at the age of fourteen.

== Pedigree ==
Pedigree of Handsome Sailor (GB), chestnut stallion, 1983
Sire Some Hand (GB) 1969	Will Somers (GB); 1955	Tudor Minstrel	Owen Tudor
Sire Some Hand (GB) 1969	Will Somers (GB); 1955	Tudor Minstrel	Sansonnet
Sire Some Hand (GB) 1969	Will Somers (GB); 1955	Queen's Jest	Nearco
Sire Some Hand (GB) 1969	Will Somers (GB); 1955	Queen's Jest	Mirth
Sire Some Hand (GB) 1969	Three Fours (GB); 1956	The Phoenix	Chateau Bouscaut
Sire Some Hand (GB) 1969	Three Fours (GB); 1956	The Phoenix	Fille de Poete
Sire Some Hand (GB) 1969	Three Fours (GB); 1956	Bonnibel	Felicitation
Sire Some Hand (GB) 1969	Three Fours (GB); 1956	Bonnibel	Beauty of England
Dam Found At Sea (USA) 1970	Pieces of Eight (IRE); 1963	Relic	War Relic
Dam Found At Sea (USA) 1970	Pieces of Eight (IRE); 1963	Relic	Bridal Colors
Dam Found At Sea (USA) 1970	Pieces of Eight (IRE); 1963	Baby Doll	Dante
Dam Found At Sea (USA) 1970	Pieces of Eight (IRE); 1963	Baby Doll	Bebe Grande
Dam Found At Sea (USA) 1970	Sea To Shore (USA); 1962	First Landing	Turn-To
Dam Found At Sea (USA) 1970	Sea To Shore (USA); 1962	First Landing	Hildene
Dam Found At Sea (USA) 1970	Sea To Shore (USA); 1962	Maiden Voyage	Ardan
Dam Found At Sea (USA) 1970	Sea To Shore (USA); 1962	Maiden Voyage	Flota (Family: 22-b)
