= Prix de la Porte Maillot =

- Class: Group 3
- Location: Longchamp Racecourse; Paris, France
- Inaugurated: 1867
- Race type: Flat / Thoroughbred
- Website: france-galop.com

Race information
- Distance: 1,400 metres (7f)
- Surface: Turf
- Track: Right-handed
- Qualification: Three-years-old and up
- Weight: 54 kg (3yo); 58 kg (4yo+); Allowances; 1½ kg for fillies and mares Penalties; 3½ kg for Group 1 winners * 3½ kg if two Group 2 wins * 2½ kg if one Group 2 win * 2½ kg if two Group 3 wins * 1½ kg if one Group 3 win * * since October 1 last year
- Purse: €56,000 (2020); 1st: €28,000

Prix de la Porte Maillot
2023
King Gold	Garrus	National Service

Previous years
2022
Amilcar	Marianafoot	Namos
2021
Marianafoot	Duhail	Go Athletico

2020-2011
2020
Space Blues	D'bai	Stunning Spirit
2019
Polydream	Marianafoot	Spinning Memories
2018
Efaadah	Inns Of Court	Jimmy Two Times
2017
Inns Of Court	African Ride	Aladdine
2016
Jimmy Two Times	Jallota	Caointiorn
2015
Joyful Trinity	De Treville	Noozhoh Canarias
2014
Sommerabend	American Devil	So Long Malpic
2013
Moonlight Cloud	Amarillo	So Long Malpic
2012
Mashoora	Shamalgan	Kendam
2011
Moonlight Cloud	African Story	Evaporation

2010-2001
2010
Joanna	Salut L'Africain	Lovelace
2009
Smooth Operator	Varenar	Dunkerque
2008
Vertigineux	Chantra	Snow Key
2007
Marchand D'Or	Bertranicus	Ridaar
2006
Marchand D'Or	Ridaar	Together
2005
Brunel	Coupe De Champe	My Man
2004
Charming Groom	Millennium Force	Sunday Doubt
2003
Lucky Strike	Millennium Force	Saratan
2002
War Zone	Cayoke	Kiddyland
2001
Tertullian	Silver Desert	Si Symphonie

2000-1990
2000
Josr Algarhoud	Cap Coz	Tumbleweed Ridge
1999
Tumbleweed Ridge	Warningford	Sand Falcon
1998
Donkey Engine	Alamo Bay	Hayil
1997
Occupandiste	Vernoy	Whenby
1996
A Magicman	Bashaayeash	Gothenberg
1995
Cherokee Rose	Bashaayeash	Poplar Bluff
1994
Unblest	Young Ern	Firm Friend
1993
Borodislew	Nidd	Shanghai
1992
Dilum	Lion Cavern	Bog Trotter
1991
Tiangar	Time Gentlemen	Safawan
1990
Funambule	Philippi	Dictator's Song

The Prix de la Porte Maillot is a Group 3 flat horse race in France open to thoroughbreds aged three years or older. It is run at Longchamp over a distance of 1,400 metres (about 7 furlongs), and it is scheduled to take place each year in late June or early July.

== History ==
The event is named after the Porte Maillot, a gateway to the Bois de Boulogne. It has been staged since 1867, although in its earlier years it was a minor race.

The profile of the Prix de la Porte Maillot was raised when it became part of the prestigious Grand Prix de Paris meeting in 1952. From this point it was contested over 1,600 metres, and it was shortened to 1,400 metres in 1955.

The race has continued to be held at Longchamp without exception^{[a]}, but it is no longer run on the same day as the Grand Prix de Paris.

== Records ==
Most successful horse (2 wins):

- Marchand d'Or – 2006, 2007
- Moonlight Cloud – 2011, 2013

Leading jockey (4 wins):

- Freddy Head – Dedini (1967), African Joy (1983), Vilikaia (1985), Funambule (1990)

Leading trainer (7 wins):

- Freddy Head – Charming Groom (2004), Marchand d'Or (2006), Marchand d'Or (2007), Moonlight Cloud (2011), Moonlight Cloud (2013), Efaadah (2018), Polydream (2019)

Leading owner (3 wins):

- Guy de Rothschild – Guersant (1952), Cobalt (1953), Soleil (1966)
- Hamdan Al Maktoum – Joanna (2010), Mashoora (2012), Efaadah (2018)
- Godolphin – Josr Algarhoud (2000), Inns of Court (2017), Space Blues (2020)

== Winners since 1979 ==
Year	Winner	Age	Jockey	Trainer	Owner	Time
1979	El Muleta	4	Philippe Paquet	François Boutin	Antonio Boesso
1980	Luck of the Draw	3	Willie Carson	Dick Hern	Sir Michael Sobell
1981	Gosport	5	Jean-Claude Desaint	J. C. Cunnington	Jean Laborde
1982	Exclusive Order	3	Maurice Philipperon	John Cunnington Jr.	Paul de Moussac
1983	African Joy	4	Freddy Head	David Smaga	Hubert Mamo
1984	Never So Bold	4	Steve Cauthen	Robert Armstrong	Edward Kessly	1:20.20
1985	Vilikaia	3	Freddy Head	Criquette Head	Robert Sangster
1986	Northern Premier	3	Cash Asmussen	Georges Mikhalidès	Mahmoud Fustok
1987	Balbonella	3	Gary W. Moore	Criquette Head	Maktoum Al Maktoum
1988	Blue Note	3	Gary W. Moore	Criquette Head	Ghislaine Head	1:22.10
1989	Gabina	4	Éric Legrix	J. C. Cunnington	Jürgen Schiefelbein	1:22.00
1990	Funambule	3	Freddy Head	Criquette Head	Etti Plesch	1:25.00
1991	Tiangar	3	William Mongil	Alain de Royer-Dupré	Aga Khan IV	1:21.30
1992	Dilum	3	Alan Munro	Paul Cole	Fahd Salman	1:20.40
1993 (dh)	Borodislew; Nidd	3; 3	Olivier Doleuze; Thierry Jarnet	Criquette Head; André Fabre	Johnny Jones; Khalid Abdullah	1:19.70
1994	Unblest	3	Cash Asmussen	James Fanshawe	3rd Baron Vestey	1:19.90
1995	Cherokee Rose	4	Cash Asmussen	John Hammond	Sheikh Mohammed	1:22.30
1996	A Magicman	4	Neil Grant	Hartmut Steguweit	Stall Dagobert	1:20.30
1997	Occupandiste	4	Olivier Doleuze	Criquette Head	Wertheimer et Frère	1:21.20
1998	Donkey Engine	4	Gérald Mossé	Alain de Royer-Dupré	Marquesa de Moratalla	1:18.80
1999	Tumbleweed Ridge	6	Michael Tebbutt	Brian Meehan	Tumbleweed P'ship	1:20.00
2000	Josr Algarhoud	4	Sylvain Guillot	Saeed bin Suroor	Godolphin	1:19.40
2001	Tertullian	6	Filip Minarik	Peter Schiergen	Gestüt Schlenderhan	1:19.20
2002	War Zone	3	Olivier Peslier	André Fabre	Khalid Abdullah	1:20.30
2003	Lucky Strike	5	Adrie de Vries	Jan Pubben	Lucky Stables	1:18.30
2004	Charming Groom	5	Davy Bonilla	Freddy Head	Wertheimer et Frère	1:20.70
2005 (dh)	Brunel; Coupe de Champe	4; 4	Darryll Holland; Christophe Lemaire	William Haggas; Patrick Tual	Highclere X Jacques Seror	1:19.80
2006	Marchand d'Or	3	Davy Bonilla	Freddy Head	Carla Giral	1:22.00
2007	Marchand d'Or	4	Davy Bonilla	Freddy Head	Carla Giral	1:19.90
2008	Vertigineux	4	Philippe Sogorb	Carole Dufrèche	C. & P. Dufrèche	1:19.90
2009	Smooth Operator	3	Maxime Guyon	Mario Hofer	Stall Jenny	1:20.00
2010	Joanna	3	Christophe Soumillon	Jean-Claude Rouget	Hamdan Al Maktoum	1:24.23
2011	Moonlight Cloud	3	Thierry Jarnet	Freddy Head	George Strawbridge	1:20.23
2012	Mashoora	3	Christophe Soumillon	Jean-Claude Rouget	Hamdan Al Maktoum	1:20.19
2013	Moonlight Cloud	5	Thierry Jarnet	Freddy Head	George Strawbridge	1:20.43
2014	Sommerabend	7	Theo Bachelot	Mirek Rulec	Stall Am Alten Flies	1:20.56
2015	Baghadur	3	Mickael Barzalona	André Fabre	Mme André Fabre	1:18.61
2016	Jimmy Two Times^{[a]}	3	Vincent Cheminaud	André Fabre	Scea Haras De Saint Pair	1:23.19
2017	Inns of Court^{[a]}	3	Mickael Barzalona	André Fabre	Godolphin	1:24.26
2018	Efaadah	3	Aurelien Lemaitre	Freddy Head	Hamdan Al Maktoum	1:20.29
2019	Polydream	4	Maxime Guyon	Freddy Head	Wertheimer et Frère	1:19.35
2020	Space Blues	4	Mickael Barzalona	Charlie Appleby	Godolphin	1:19.91
2021	Marianafoot	6	Mickael Barzalona	Jerome Reynier	Jean-Claude Seroul	1:21.25
2022	Amilcar	6	Theo Bachelot	A & G Botti	Emadadein Alhtoushi	1:21.07
2026	Khovikhov	3	Alexis Pouchin	Mauricio Delcher Sanchez	Alain Jathiere & Gerard Augustin-Normand	1:20:55

^{a} The 2016 & 2017 races took place at Deauville while Longchamp was closed for redevelopment.

== Earlier winners ==
- 1952: Guersant
- 1953: Cobalt
- 1954: Falstaff
- 1955: Americ
- 1956: Verrieres
- 1957: Balbo
- 1958: Shut Up
- 1959: Radjah
- 1960: Debut
- 1961: Tertullien
- 1962: Prince Altana
- 1963: Linacre
- 1964: Kirkland Lake
- 1965: The Marshal
- 1966: Soleil
- 1967: Dedini
- 1968: Rosetta
- 1969: Democratie
- 1970: Great Heron
- 1971: Faraway Son
- 1972: Sallust
- 1973: Boldboy
- 1974: El Rastro
- 1975: Hamada
- 1976: Son of Silver
- 1977: Polyponder
- 1978: Faraway Times

== See also ==
- List of French flat horse races
