= Dowsing (horse) =

American-bred Thoroughbred racehorse

- Sire: Riverman
- Grandsire: Never Bend
- Dam: Prospector's Fire
- Damsire: Mr. Prospector
- Sex: Stallion
- Foaled: 21 April 1984
- Country: United States
- Colour: Brown
- Breeder: Edward A Seltzer
- Owner: Khalid Abdullah
- Trainer: Jeremy Tree
- Record: 14: 4-1-1

Major wins
- Diadem Stakes (1987); Vernons Sprint Cup (1988)

Dowsing (21 April 1984 – 1 January 1993) was an American-bred British-trained Thoroughbred racehorse and sire. A specialist sprinter, he excelled over six furlongs and won four of his fourteen races between 1986 and 1988. After failing to win in two starts as juvenile, Dowsing showed improved form is 1987 when he won three races including a valuable handicap at Doncaster Racecourse and the Diadem Stakes on his final appearance. In the following year he took time to reach his best form but again ended his season triumphantly as he recorded his biggest win in the Group One Vernons Sprint Cup.

== Background ==
Dowsing was a "tall, close-coupled, attractive" brown horse with a small white star bred in Kentucky by Edward A Seltzer. He was sired by Riverman an American-bred, French-trained who won the Poule d'Essai des Poulains and the Prix Jean Prat in 1972. Riverman went on to become a highly successful stallion, whose offspring included Triptych, Irish River, Gold River and Bahri. Dowsing's dam Prospector's Fire failed to win in two races but became a successful broodmare who also produced the Beverly D. Stakes winner Fire the Groom who was in turn the dam of Stravinsky. Prospector's Fire was a daughter of the Kentucky Oaks winner Native Street.

In July 1985 the yearling was entered in the Keeneland July Select Yearling Sale and was bought for $400,000 by the bloodstock agent James Delahooke on behalf of the Saudi prince Khalid Abdullah. He was sent to Europe and was trained throughout his racing career by Jeremy Tree at Beckhampton.

== Racing career ==
=== 1986: two-year-old season ===
Dowsing made his racecourse debut in the Houghton Stakes at Newmarket Racecourse in October when he finished tenth of the twelve runners after struggling against his jockey's attempts to restrain him. In November he started second favourite for a maiden race over six furlongs at Doncaster Racecourse but finished sixth of the twenty-two runners.

=== 1987: three-year-old season ===
Dowsing began his second season by winning a minor race over six furlongs at Warwick Racecourse and finished second when moved up to seven furlongs on his next appearance. At York Racecourse he recorded his first important success when he won the William Hill Golden Spurs Trophy Handicap. In late July he was assigned top weight of 136 pounds for the Stewards' Cup and finished fourth behind the lightly weighted outsider Madraco. The colt ran poorly in a Listed race at Newmarket and then finished fourth to Guest Performer in the Park Stakes over seven furlongs at Doncaster in September, appearing to run out of stamina in the closing stages. In the Group Three Diadem Stakes at Ascot Racecourse Dowsing started the 8/1 third favourite behind Hallgate (winner of the race in 1986) and Print PHopeful Stakes. Ridden as in most of his previous races by Pat Eddery, he tracked the leaders before moving up to challenge the pace-setter Governor General a furlong out. After a protracted struggle, Dowsing got the better of Governor General and won by a length despite flashing his tail in the closing stages.

=== 1988: four-year-old season ===
Dowsing began his third season in the Duke of York Stakes at York on 12 May and finished fifth of the thirteen runners behind Handsome Sailor. At Royal Ascot in June he started the 9/2 second favourite for the Cork and Orrery Stakes and finished fifth behind Posada. On 26 July Dowsing ran for the second time in the Stewards' Cup and carried top weight of 140 pounds. He finished third of the twenty-eight runners behind Rotherfield Greys and Glencroft.

In August Dowsing was sent to France to contest the Prix de Meautry at Deauville Racecourse and finished fourth behind Cricket Ball. On 12 September, Dowsing was one of ten horses to contest the Group One Vernons Sprint Cup over six furlongs at Haydock Park. The Irish colt Big Shuffle started favourite ahead of Handsome Sailor, Caerwent (National Stakes) and Silver Fling with Dowsing next in betting at odds of 15/2. The other five runners were Ghariba (Nell Gwyn Stakes), Print, Umbelata, Sharp Romance and Polykratis. After being "driven along" by Eddery in the last quarter mile, Dowsing gained the advantage in the final strides and won by a head from Silver Fling with a gap of four lengths back to Caerwent in third place.

== Stud record ==
Dowsing was retired from racing to become a breeding stallion. The best off his offspring was probably Tedburrow, who won twenty-one races including the Flying Five and the Chipchase Stakes. Dowsing died in Japan on 1 January 1993.

== Pedigree ==
Pedigree of Dowsing (USA), brown stallion, 1984
Sire Riverman (USA) 1969	Never Bend (USA); 1960	Nasrullah	Nearco
Sire Riverman (USA) 1969	Never Bend (USA); 1960	Nasrullah	Mumtaz Begum
Sire Riverman (USA) 1969	Never Bend (USA); 1960	Lalun	Djeddah
Sire Riverman (USA) 1969	Never Bend (USA); 1960	Lalun	Be Faithful
Sire Riverman (USA) 1969	River Lady (USA); 1963	Prince John	Princequillo
Sire Riverman (USA) 1969	River Lady (USA); 1963	Prince John	Not Afraid
Sire Riverman (USA) 1969	River Lady (USA); 1963	Nile Lily	Roman
Sire Riverman (USA) 1969	River Lady (USA); 1963	Nile Lily	Azalea
Dam Prospector's Fire (USA) 1976	Mr. Prospector (USA); 1970	Raise a Native	Native Dancer
Dam Prospector's Fire (USA) 1976	Mr. Prospector (USA); 1970	Raise a Native	Raise You
Dam Prospector's Fire (USA) 1976	Mr. Prospector (USA); 1970	Gold Digger	Nashua
Dam Prospector's Fire (USA) 1976	Mr. Prospector (USA); 1970	Gold Digger	Sequence
Dam Prospector's Fire (USA) 1976	Native Street (USA); 1963	Native Dancer	Polynesian
Dam Prospector's Fire (USA) 1976	Native Street (USA); 1963	Native Dancer	Geisha
Dam Prospector's Fire (USA) 1976	Native Street (USA); 1963	Beaver Street	My Babu
Dam Prospector's Fire (USA) 1976	Native Street (USA); 1963	Beaver Street	Wood Fire (Family 3-d)

- Through his dam, Dowsing was inbred 3 × 4 to Native Dancer, meaning that this stallion appears in both the third and fourth generations of his pedigree.
