= Prix de Ris-Orangis =

- Class: Group 3
- Location: Maisons-Laffitte; France
- Inaugurated: 1970
- Race type: Flat / Thoroughbred
- Website: france-galop.com

Race information
- Distance: 1,200 metres (6f)
- Surface: Turf
- Track: Straight
- Qualification: Three-years-old and up
- Weight: 54½ kg (3yo); 57 kg (4yo+); Allowances; 1½ kg for fillies and mares Penalties; 4 kg for Group 1 winners * 3 kg for Group 2 winners * 2 kg for Group 3 winners * * since August 1 last year
- Purse: €56,000 (2020); 1st: €28,000

Prix de Ris-Orangis
2025
Beauvatier	Spycatcher	Tribalist

Previous years
2024
Shouldvebeenaring	Electric Storm	Shartash
2023
Spycatcher	Batwan	Monarchic
2022
Garrus	Batwan	Wings Of War
2021
Ocean	Coeur De Pierre	Sestilio Jet

2020-2011
2020
Royal Crusade	Glen Shiel	Dubai Station
2019
King Malpic	Inns Of Court	Gold Vibe
2018
Inns Of Court	King Malpic	Abrantes
2017
Rosa Imperial	Son Cesio	Attendu
2016
Damila	Love Spirit	Pupa Di Saronno
2015
Son Cesio	Suedois	Gammarth
2014
Thawaany	Zejel	Signs Of Blessing
2013
Abu Sidra	Princedargent	Morache Music
2012
Lockwood	Gammarth	Marchand D'Or
2011
Time Prisoner	Fred Lalloupet	Smooth Operator

2010–2001
2010
War Artist	Tiza	Dam D'Augy
2009
Tiza	Delvita	Aiboa
2008
Mariol	Stern Opinion	Only Answer
2007
Tiza	Garnica	Val Jaro
2006
Presto Shinko	Satri	Tycoon's Hill
2005
Striking Ambition	Nipping	Steenberg
2004
The Trader	Swedish Shave	The Wise Lady
2003
Swedish Shave	Vasywait	Blanche
2002
Zipping	May Ball	Danger Over
2001
Sartorial	Danger Over	Misty Eyed

2000–1994
2000
Gorse	Danger Over	Tomba
1999
Keos	Andreyev	Rangoon Ruby
1998
Keos	Dyhim Diamond	Andreyev
1997
Monaassib	Zamindar	Nombre Premier
1996
Miesque's Son	Kistena	Don't Worry Me
1995
Diffident	Linoise	Wessam Prince
1994
West Man	Way West	Brave Note

The Prix de Ris-Orangis is a Group 3 flat horse race in France open to thoroughbreds aged three years or older. It is run at Maisons-Laffitte over a distance of 1,200 metres (about 6 furlongs), and it is scheduled to take place each year in July.

== History ==
The event was established in 1970, and it was initially called the Prix d'Évry. It was named after a new racecourse under construction at Évry. The first running was held at Saint-Cloud. It was originally a 1,600-metre race for horses aged four or older, and it took place in early spring.

The Prix d'Évry was transferred to Maisons-Laffitte and given Group 3 status in 1971.

The race moved to Évry when the venue opened in 1973. At this point it was renamed after Ris-Orangis, a commune in which part of the racecourse was situated.

The Prix de Ris-Orangis was cut to 1,200 metres, switched to July and opened to three-year-olds in 1987. It was transferred to Deauville in 1997.

The race was staged at Maisons-Laffitte in 2006. It returned to Deauville in 2007, moved back to Maisons-Laffitte in 2009 and was run at Deauville again in 2013 and 2014 before returning to Maisons-Laffitte in 2015.

== Records ==
Most successful horse (3 wins):

- El Rastro – 1974, 1975, 1976

Leading jockey (4 wins):

- Yves Saint-Martin – El Rastro (1974, 1975), Nadjar (1980), Naishakar (1984)

Leading trainer (4 wins):

- Angel Penna – Gift Card (1973), El Rastro (1974, 1975, 1976)
- Alain de Royer-Dupré – Naishakar (1984), Tiza (2007, 2009), War Artist (2010)
- André Fabre – Wedding of the Sea (1992), Diffident (1995), Time Prisoner (2011), Lockwood (2012)

Leading owner (5 wins):

- Godolphin – Time Prisoner (2011), Lockwood (2012), Rosa Imperial (2017), Inns of Court (2018), Royal Crusade (2020)

== Winners since 1978 ==
Year	Winner	Age	Jockey	Trainer	Owner	Time
1978	Sanedtki	4	Alain Lequeux	Olivier Douieb	B. Zimmerman	1:48.50
1979	El Muleta	4	Freddy Head	François Boutin	Antonio Boesso	1:46.10
1980	Nadjar	4	Yves Saint-Martin	Aage Paus	Gunnar Schjelderup
1981	Hilal	5	Alfred Gibert	Mitri Saliba	Mahmoud Fustok	1:39.30
1982	Big John	4	Alain Lequeux	E. Chevalier du Fau	John Michael	1:39.50
1983	Princes Gate	6	Trevor Rogers	Harry Thomson Jones	Hamdan Al Maktoum	1:51.80
1984	Naishakar	5	Yves Saint-Martin	Alain de Royer-Dupré	HH Aga Khan IV	1:43.20
1985	Truculent	4	Freddy Head	Criquette Head	Jacques Wertheimer	1:39.60
1986	Vertige	4	Éric Legrix	Patrick Biancone	Daniel Wildenstein	1:52.70
1987	Handsome Sailor	4	Ron Quinton	Barry Hills	Robert Sangster	1:08.55
1988	Export Price	4	Freddy Head	Pascal Bary	Ecurie I. M. Fares	1:12.77
1989	Cricket Ball	6	Gérald Mossé	John Fellows	Robin Scully	1:10.87
1990	Ron's Victory	3	Tony Cruz	Alain Falourd	Jerry Moss	1:08.73
1991	Divine Danse	3	Guy Guignard	Criquette Head	Ecurie Åland	1:10.43
1992	Wedding of the Sea	3	Thierry Jarnet	André Fabre	Sheikh Mohammed	1:10.69
1993	Three for Fantasy	3	Olivier Peslier	Nicolas Clément	Anne de Contades	1:11.19
1994	West Man	3	Sylvain Guillot	Robert Collet	Henri Chalhoub	1:09.87
1995	Diffident	3	Thierry Jarnet	André Fabre	Sheikh Mohammed	1:13.79
1996	Miesque's Son	4	Cash Asmussen	John Hammond	Niarchos Family	1:09.23
1997	Monaassib	6	Daragh O'Donohoe	Ed Dunlop	Maktoum Al Maktoum	1:09.80
1998	Keos	4	Cash Asmussen	John Hammond	Niarchos Family	1:10.60
1999	Keos	5	Cash Asmussen	John Hammond	Niarchos Family	1:11.10
2000	Gorse	5	Gérald Mossé	Henry Candy	Girsonfield Ltd	1:12.60
2001	Sartorial	5	Seb Sanders	Peter Makin	Gretta Sarfaty Marchant	1:10.60
2002	Zipping	3	Davy Bonilla	Robert Collet	Richard Strauss	1:09.40
2003	Swedish Shave	5	Thierry Jarnet	Richard Gibson	Sten Thynell	1:08.90
2004	The Trader	6	Fergus Sweeney	Michael Blanshard	Caroline Ward	1:10.70
2005	Striking Ambition	5	Thierry Thulliez	Roger Charlton	Peter Webb	1:09.30
2006	Presto Shinko	5	Thierry Thulliez	Richard Hannon Sr.	Tony Everett	1:11.70
2007	Tiza	5	Christophe Soumillon	Alain de Royer-Dupré	James Atkinson	1:11.20
2008	Mariol	5	Sébastien Maillot	Robert Collet	Vidal Family	1:10.60
2009	Tiza	7	Dominique Boeuf	Alain de Royer-Dupré	Jean-Claude Seroul	1:11.20
2010	War Artist	7	Olivier Peslier	Alain de Royer-Dupré	Rupert Plersch	1:11.60
2011	Time Prisoner	4	Maxime Guyon	André Fabre	Godolphin	1:10.40
2012	Lockwood	3	Pierre-Charles Boudot	André Fabre	Godolphin	1:11.21
2013	Abu Sidra	4	Christophe Soumillon	Jean-François Bernard	Mubarak Al Naemi	1:10.69
2014	Thawaany	4	Olivier Peslier	Freddy Head	Hamdan Al Maktoum	1:09.65
2015	Son Cesio	4	Fabrice Veron	Henri-Alex Pantall	Yves Borotra	1:10.80
2016	Damila	3	Cristian Demuro	Henri-Alex Pantall	Pierre Pasquiou	1:10.50
2017	Rosa Imperial	4	Mickael Barzalona	André Fabre	Godolphin	1:09.72
2018	Inns of Court	4	Mickael Barzalona	André Fabre	Godolphin	1:10.55
2019	King Malpic	6	Olivier Peslier	Thierry Lemer	Emilie Lafeu	1:11.10
2020	Royal Crusade (Note: The 2020 race was run at Deauville due to the COVID-19 pandemic in France)	3	William Buick	Charlie Appleby	Godolphin	1:10.32
2021	Ocean (Note: The 2021 race was run at Deauville due to closure at Maisons-Laffitte)	3	Theo Bachelot	Stephan Cerulis	Trois Mille	1:09.96
2022	Garrus (Note: The 2022 race was run at Deauville due to closure at Maisons-Laffitte)	6	Ryan Moore	Charles Hills	Mrs Susan Roy	1:08.98
2023	Spycatcher	5	Clifford Lee	Karl Burke	Highclere T'Bredracing-Adriana Zaefferer	1:10.77
2026	Mise En Boite	4	Anthony Crastus	Xavier Blanchet	Haras De Saint-Voir	1:08:78

== Earlier winners ==
- 1970: Prince Regent
- 1971: Dictus
- 1972: Etoile Lointaine
- 1973: Gift Card
- 1974: El Rastro
- 1975: El Rastro
- 1976: El Rastro
- 1977: Mittainvilliers

== See also ==
- List of French flat horse races
- Recurring sporting events established in 1970 – this race is included under its original title, Prix d'Évry.
