= Fard (horse) =

Irish-bred Thoroughbred racehorse

- Sire: Reprimand
- Grandsire: Mummy's Pet
- Dam: Anneli Rose
- Damsire: Superlative
- Sex: Stallion
- Foaled: 17 February 1992
- Country: Ireland
- Colour: Grey
- Breeder: N Abbott
- Owner: Hamdan Al Maktoum
- Trainer: David Morley
- Record: 12: 4-2-1
- Earnings: £122,911

Major wins
- Middle Park Stakes (1994)

Fard (February 1992 – 2003) was an Irish-bred, British-trained Thoroughbred racehorse and sire best known for his upset win in the 1994 Middle Park Stakes. As a two-year-old in 1994 the colt showed promise by winning three of his first six races, but also showed a marked tendency to veer left or right under pressure. In the Middle Park Stakes the application of blinkers appeared to solve his problems and he recorded a decisive victory at odds of 33/1. In the following year he was campaigned over sprint distances and failed to win in four starts. He then became a breeding stallion in South Africa where he had some success as a sire of winners.

== Background ==
Fard was a grey horse bred in Ireland by N Abbott. On 30 September 1993, the yearling colt was offered for sale at Tattersalls and was bought for 52,000 guineas by Hamdan Al Maktoum's Shadwell Estate Company. He was sent into training with David Morley at his High Haven stable in Newmarket, Suffolk.

Fard was sired by Reprimand, a top-class racehorse whose wins included the Gimcrack Stakes, Earl of Sefton Stakes and Sandown Mile. The best of his other progeny was probably Suggestive who won the Criterion Stakes in 2006. Fard's dam Anneli Rose showed very modest racing ability, winning one small race at Lingfield Park Racecourse in 1990 from seven lifetime starts. She was descended from Gallissa, who was a half-sister of Lorenzaccio and a distant relative of Thatching.

== Racing career ==
=== 1994: two-year-old season ===
Fard began his racing career in a six furlong maiden race at Doncaster Racecourse on 28 May in which he started a 20/1 outsider and finished third behind his owner's more fancied runner Al Nufooth. By the end of September the race appeared a very strong maiden as the runner-up Raah Alghaarb won the Flying Childers Stakes and the fourth-placed Chilly Billy won the Gimcrack Stakes. Willie Carson, who became the colt's regular jockey, took the ride when Fard started favourite for a five-runner maiden over the same distance at York Racecourse two weeks later. The grey recorded his first success as he won by one and a half lengths despite hanging badly left approaching the last quarter mile.

On 1 July Fard was dropped in distance but moved up in class for a minor stakes race over five furlongs at Beverley Racecourse. His task was made easier when the favourite Tanami slipped and fell exiting the stalls and he won by one and a half lengths from Sound The Trumpet although he hung to the right in the closing stages. At the end of the month Fard was assigned a weight of 127 pounds for a nursery (a handicap race for two-year-olds) over six furlongs at Newmarket Racecourse in which he was ridden by Richard Hills and started at odds of 7/1 in field of thirteen juveniles. He tracked the leaders before going to the front approaching the final furlongs and winning by one and a half lengths from the Richard Hannon Sr.-trained Dimes. As in his two previous wins he failed to keep a straight course, edging to the right near the finish.

The Gimcrack Stakes at York on 17 August saw Fard moved up to Group Two class and starting at odds of 10/1 in an eleven-runner field. With Carson opting to ride Al Nufooth, the colt was ridden by Mick Kinane. After hanging left a furlong from the finish he finished fourth behind Chilly Billy, the July Stakes winner Fallow and Moon King, with Al Nufooth in fifth, and Mind Games (Norfolk Stakes) in seventh. Twelve days later Fard started favourite for the Two-Year-Old Trophy at Ripon Racecourse but was beaten two lengths into second by the filly Limerick Belle.

Fard was equipped with blinkers for the first time (on Morley's recommendation) when he started a 33/1 outsider for the Group One Middle Park Stakes over six furlongs at Newmarket on 29 September in which Fallow, Raah Alghaarb, Mind Games and Moon King were again in opposition. The Sirenia Stakes winner Art of War started favourite ahead of Bin Nashwan (third in the Prix de la Salamandre) whilst the other three runners were Green Perfume (Moët & Chandon Rennen), Alami (third in the Champagne Stakes) and the outsider Che Sera Sera. Fard raced up the stands-side of the wide straight (the left-hand side from the jockey's viewpoint) and tracked the leaders before accelerating past his rivals in the final furlong. He quickly established a clear advantage and won in "impressive" style by three and a half lengths and a neck from Green Perfume and Fallow. At the next Newmarket meeting, Fard was moved up to seven furlongs for the Dewhurst Stakes and started 7/2 third favourite. He pulled hard against Carson's early attempts to restrain him and never looked likely to win, eventually finishing sixth of the seven runners behind Pennekamp.

=== 1995: three-year-old season ===
In all of his starts as a three-year-old, Fard was matched against older horses in major sprint races and was ridden throughout the year by Carson. On his seasonal debut in the Leisure Stakes at Lingfield on 3 June he finished second to the five-year-old Roger the Butler when attempting to concede weight to his older rival. Less than three weeks later he was sent to Royal Ascot for the King's Stand Stakes (then a Group Two race) over five furlongs and finished fifth of the ten runners behind Piccolo. In the July Cup at Newmarket he finished fifth again, beaten more than seven lengths by the winner Lake Coniston. In August he was sent to France for the Prix Maurice de Gheest over 1300 metres at Deauville Racecourse. He was never in contention and finished eighth of the ten runners behind Cherokee Rose.

== Stud record ==
At the end of his racing career, Fard was exported to become a breeding stallion at the Summerhill Stud in KwaZulu-Natal, South Africa. The best of his offspring was probably Far De Vie who won the Grade 1 South African Fillies Sprint in 2005.

== Pedigree ==
Pedigree of Fard (IRE), grey stallion, 1992
Sire Reprimand (GB) 1985	Mummy's Pet (GB); 1968	Sing Sing	Tudor Minstrel
Sire Reprimand (GB) 1985	Mummy's Pet (GB); 1968	Sing Sing	Agin the Law
Sire Reprimand (GB) 1985	Mummy's Pet (GB); 1968	Money For Nothing	Grey Sovereign
Sire Reprimand (GB) 1985	Mummy's Pet (GB); 1968	Money For Nothing	Sweet Nothings
Sire Reprimand (GB) 1985	Just You Wait (GB); 1980	Nonoalco	Nearctic
Sire Reprimand (GB) 1985	Just You Wait (GB); 1980	Nonoalco	Seximee
Sire Reprimand (GB) 1985	Just You Wait (GB); 1980	Sleat	Santa Claus
Sire Reprimand (GB) 1985	Just You Wait (GB); 1980	Sleat	Belle of Athens
Dam Anneli Rose (GB) 1987	Superlative (IRE); 1981	Nebbiolo	Yellow God
Dam Anneli Rose (GB) 1987	Superlative (IRE); 1981	Nebbiolo	Novara
Dam Anneli Rose (GB) 1987	Superlative (IRE); 1981	Clariden	Hook Money
Dam Anneli Rose (GB) 1987	Superlative (IRE); 1981	Clariden	Matterhorn
Dam Anneli Rose (GB) 1987	Red Rose Bowl (IRE); 1980	Dragonara Palace	Young Emperor
Dam Anneli Rose (GB) 1987	Red Rose Bowl (IRE); 1980	Dragonara Palace	Ruby's Princess
Dam Anneli Rose (GB) 1987	Red Rose Bowl (IRE); 1980	Loren	Crocket
Dam Anneli Rose (GB) 1987	Red Rose Bowl (IRE); 1980	Loren	Gallissa (Family: 5-h)
