= Mastery (horse) =

British-bred Thoroughbred racehorse

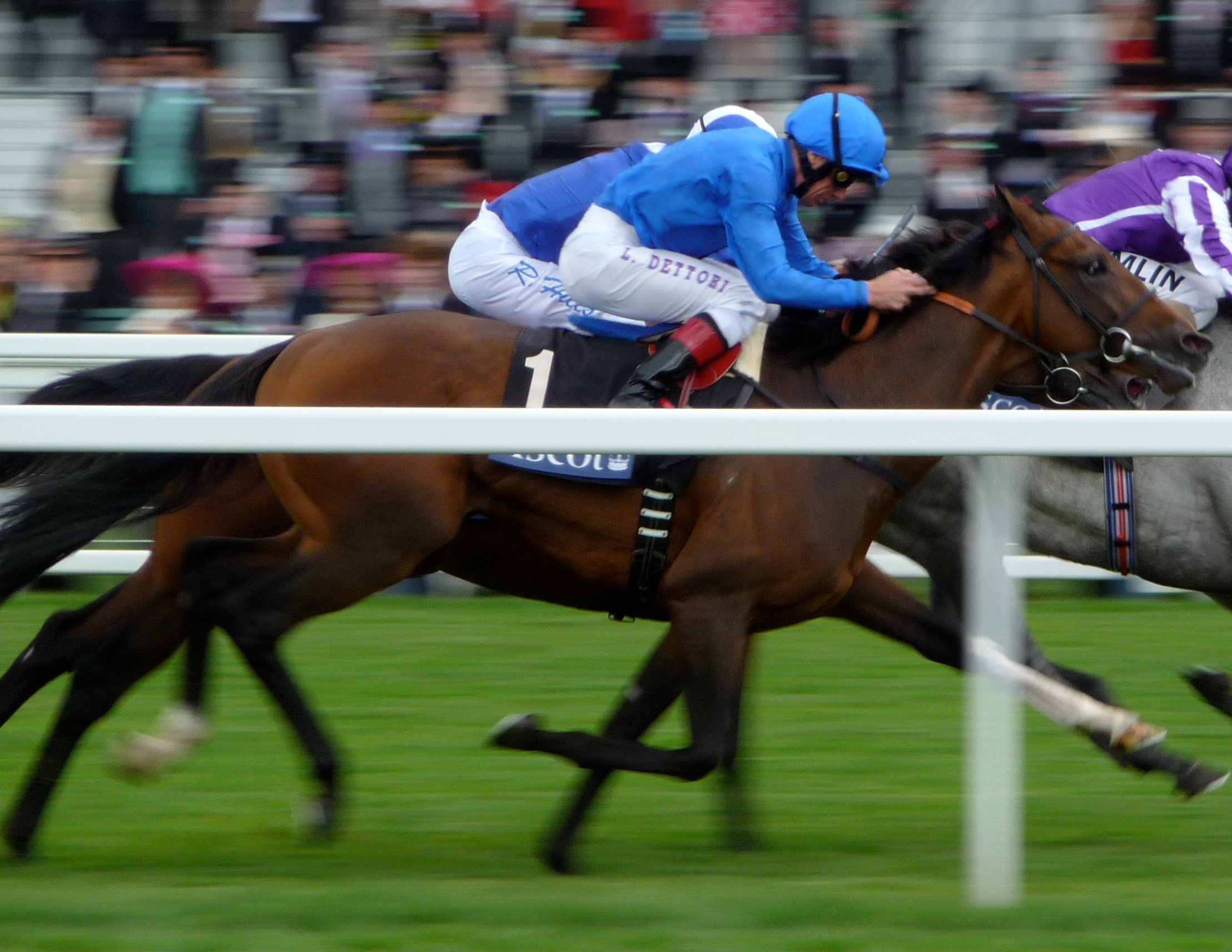
- Mastery at 2009 Queen's Vase.
- Sire: Sulamani
- Grandsire: Hernando
- Dam: Moyesii
- Damsire: Diesis
- Sex: Stallion
- Foaled: 25 February 2006
- Country: United Kingdom
- Colour: Bay
- Breeder: Darley Stud
- Owner: Hamdan Bin Mohammed Al Maktoum; Godolphin Racing
- Trainer: Mark Johnston; Saeed Bin Suroor
- Record: 13: 5-1-5
- Earnings: £1,654,848

Major wins
- Derby Italiano (2009); St. Leger Stakes (2009); Hong Kong Vase (2010)

Mastery (foaled 25 February 2006) is a British Thoroughbred racehorse. In a racing career which lasted from October 2008 until 2010 he ran thirteen times and won five races. As a three-year-old in 2009 he won the Derby Italiano and the St Leger. In 2010 he won the Hong Kong Vase.

== Background ==
Mastery is a bay horse sired by Sulamani the winner of several major races including the Prix du Jockey Club and the International Stakes. His dam Moyesii won only one minor race but was a daughter of the Haydock Sprint Cup and Prix Maurice de Gheest winner Cherokee Rose.

== Racing career ==
=== 2008: two-year-old season ===
Mastery made his debut in a maiden race at Nottingham in October 2008. Starting at odds of 15/2 he led from the start and won by four and a half lengths despite being eased in the closing stages. Nine days later he finished third to Chater Way in a minor stakes race at Newmarket. At the end of the season, Mastery was transferred to the ownership of Godolphin Racing and moved to the stable of Saeed Bin Suroor.

=== 2009: three-year-old season ===
Mastery began his three-year-old season by finishing fourth to Mafaaz in a race on the all-weather surface at Kempton in March. He was then moved up in class to contest the Group Two Derby Italiano at Rome's Capannelle Racecourse in May. Ridden for the first time by Frankie Dettori he raced just behind the leaders before taking the lead 100m from the finish and winning by one and a half lengths from Turati and Jakkalberry. In summer, Mastery was placed in his next three races. He finished third to Holberg in the Queen's Vase at Royal Ascot, third to Cavalryman in the Grand Prix de Paris and second to the Irish-trained Monitor Closely in the Great Voltigeur Stakes.

In September, Mastery was sent to Doncaster for the St Leger in which he was ridden by Ted Durcan, Dettori having chosen to ride the favourite Kite Wood. Mastery started a 14/1 outsider in a field of eight runners. Mastery tracked the leaders before challenging in the straight. He stayed on "gamely" to take the lead close to the finish and won by three quarters of a length from Kite Wood and Monitor Closely. On his final start of the season, Mastery was sent to Santa Anita Park where he started favourite for the Breeders' Cup Marathon in which he finished third to Man of Iron and Cloudy's Knight.

=== 2010: four-year-old season ===
Mastery made his first appearance of 2010 in the Dubai World Cup at Meydan Racecourse on 27 March. He finished fifth, beaten one and a half lengths by the Brazilian-bred Gloria De Campeao. He was then off the racecourse for more than six months before finishing third to Tazee in the Darley Stakes at Newmarket in October. Three weeks later he recorded his first win in over a year when he dead-heated with Dansili Dancer in a Listed race at Kempton.

On his final start of 2010, Mastery was sent to Hong Kong to contest the Hong Kong Vase at Sha Tin Racecourse on 12 December. He started at odds of 19/5 in a field which included the Melbourne Cup winner Americain, the Tenno Sho winner Jaguar Mail and the local champion Viva Pataca. Dettori settled the colt in third place before taking the lead in the straight. Mastery went clear of his rivals and "kept on strongly" to win by two and a half lengths from Redwood, with Americain third.

Mastery was transferred by Godolphin to Darley and sold to Russia.

== Pedigree ==
Pedigree of Mastery (GB), bay or brown stallion, 2006
Sire Sulamani (IRE) 1999	Hernando; 1990	Niniski	Nijinsky
Sire Sulamani (IRE) 1999	Hernando; 1990	Niniski	Virginia Hills
Sire Sulamani (IRE) 1999	Hernando; 1990	Whakilyric	Miswaki
Sire Sulamani (IRE) 1999	Hernando; 1990	Whakilyric	Lyrism
Sire Sulamani (IRE) 1999	Soul Dream; 1990	Alleged	Hoist the Flag
Sire Sulamani (IRE) 1999	Soul Dream; 1990	Alleged	Princess Pout
Sire Sulamani (IRE) 1999	Soul Dream; 1990	Normia	Northfields
Sire Sulamani (IRE) 1999	Soul Dream; 1990	Normia	Mia Pola
Dam Moyesii (USA) 1997	Diesis; 1980	Sharpen Up	Atan
Dam Moyesii (USA) 1997	Diesis; 1980	Sharpen Up	Rocchetta
Dam Moyesii (USA) 1997	Diesis; 1980	Doubly Sure	Reliance
Dam Moyesii (USA) 1997	Diesis; 1980	Doubly Sure	Soft Angels
Dam Moyesii (USA) 1997	Cherokee Rose; 1991	Dancing Brave	Lyphard
Dam Moyesii (USA) 1997	Cherokee Rose; 1991	Dancing Brave	Navajo Princess
Dam Moyesii (USA) 1997	Cherokee Rose; 1991	Celtic Assembly	Secretariat
Dam Moyesii (USA) 1997	Cherokee Rose; 1991	Celtic Assembly	Welsh Garden (Family 10-c)
