= Prix du Palais-Royal =

Flat horse race in France

- Class: Group 3
- Location: Longchamp Racecourse; Paris, France
- Inaugurated: 1968
- Race type: Flat / Thoroughbred
- Website: france-galop.com

Race information
- Distance: 1,400 metres (7f)
- Surface: Turf
- Track: Right-handed
- Qualification: Three-years-old and up
- Weight: 54 kg (3yo); 58½ kg (4yo+); Allowances; 1½ kg for fillies and mares Penalties; 3 kg for Group 1 winners * 3 kg if two Group 2 wins * 2 kg if one Group 2 win * 2 kg if two Group 3 wins * 1 kg if one Group 3 win * * since July 1 last year
- Purse: €80,000 (2014); 1st: €40,000

Prix du Palais-Royal
2024
Exxtra	Breizh Sky	Yosemite Valley

Previous years
2023
Fort Payne	National Service	King Gold
2022
Egot	Marianafoot	Accakaba
2021
Marianafoot	Duhail	Namos

2020-2011
2020
Spinning Memories	Azano	Stunning Spirit
2019
Hey Gaman	King Malpic	Polydream
2018
Polydream	Inns Of Court	Jimmy Two Times
2017
Inns Of Court	Attendu	Karar
2016
Attendu	Esoterique	Territories
2015
Rosso Corsa	Robert Le Diable	Complimentor
2014
American Devil	Sommerabend	Bamiyan
2013
Pearl Flute	Tulips	Pollyana
2012
Moonlight Cloud	So Long Malpic	Aesop's Fables
2011
Sahpresa	Moonlight Cloud	Evaporation

2010-2001
2010
Dalghar	Colonial	Salut L'Africain
2009
Dunkerque	As De Trebol	Mariol
2008
Garnica	Belliflore	Tiza
2007
Garnica	Ridaar	Donatello
2006
Satri	Helios Quercus	Nid D'Abeilles
2005
Art Master	Byron	Star Valley
2004
Puppeteer	Saratan	Blanche
2003
Saratan	Meshaheer	Mount Abu
2002
Frenchmans Bay	Tempting Fate	Cayoke
2001
Lunasalt	Three Points	Jentzen

2000-1990
2000
Blu Air Force	Warningford	Tumbleweed Ridge
1999
Russian Revival	Tycoon's Dolce	Massimo
1998
Hidden Meadow	Pas De Reponse	Russian Revival
1997
Nombre Premier	Earl Of March	Wizard King
1996
Mistle Cat	Myself	Young Ern
1995
Cherokee Rose	Sayyedati	Poplar Bluff
1994
Young Ern	First Trump	Foxhound
1993
Voleris	Acteur Francais	Crack Regiment
1992
Robin Des Pins	Zanadiyka	Tertian
1991
Polski Boy	Murmure	Ski Chief
1990
Funambule	Rock City	Dictator's Song

The Prix du Palais-Royal is a Group 3 flat horse race in France open to thoroughbreds aged three years or older. It is run at Longchamp over a distance of 1,400 metres (about 7 furlongs), and it is scheduled to take place each year in late May or early June.

The event is named after the Palais-Royal, a palace and an associated garden located in Paris. The race was established in 1968, and with four exceptions — the 1996 and 2016 runnings at Deauville, the 2017 running at Maisons-Laffitte and the 2020 running at Clairefontaine — it has always taken place at Longchamp. Its distance has remained at 1,400 metres since its creation.

For several years before its launch there was an event titled the Prix Palais Royal at Saint-Cloud. This was named after a racehorse called Palais Royal, the winner of the Cambridgeshire Handicap and runner-up in the St Leger in 1928.

== Records ==
Most successful horse (2 wins):

- Garnica – 2007, 2008

Leading jockey (5 wins):

- Freddy Head – Regent Street (1969), Prince Mab (1981), Honeyland (1983), Funambule (1990), Robin des Pins (1992)
- Cash Asmussen – Bon Vent (1988), Polish Precedent (1989), Polski Boy (1991), Voleris (1993), Cherokee Rose (1995)

Leading trainer (6 wins):

- André Fabre – Bon Vent (1988), Polish Precedent (1989), Lunasalt (2001), Art Master (2005), Inns of Court (2017), Egot (2022)

Leading owner (4 wins):

- Daniel Wildenstein – African Sky (1973), Gravelines (1976), Bon Vent (1988), Blu Air Force (2000)

== Winners since 1980 ==
Year	Winner	Age	Jockey	Trainer	Owner	Time
1980	Baptism	4	Pat Eddery	Jeremy Tree	John Hay Whitney	1:25.6
1981	Prince Mab	3	Freddy Head	Alec Head	Jacques Wertheimer
1982	Indian King	4	Greville Starkey	Guy Harwood	J. Levy
1983	Honeyland	4	Freddy Head	Alec Head	Jacques Wertheimer
1984	Harlow	4	George Duffield	Sir Mark Prescott	John E. Anthony
1985	Spectacular Joke	3	Maurice Philipperon	John Cunnington Jr.	Paul de Moussac
1986	Comrade in Arms	4	Gérard Dubroeucq	Philippe Lallié	D. W. Molins
1987	Turkish Ruler	4	Jorge Velásquez	Georges Mikhalidès	Mahmoud Fustok
1988	Bon Vent	3	Cash Asmussen	André Fabre	Daniel Wildenstein	1:22.0
1989	Polish Precedent	3	Cash Asmussen	André Fabre	Sheikh Mohammed	1:22.3
1990	Funambule	3	Freddy Head	Criquette Head	Etti Plesch	1:23.2
1991	Polski Boy	3	Cash Asmussen	Robert Collet	René Aubert	1:22.7
1992	Robin des Pins	4	Freddy Head	François Boutin	Stavros Niarchos	1:22.7
1993	Voleris	4	Cash Asmussen	John Hammond	David Thompson	1:21.4
1994	Young Ern	4	Richard Quinn	Simon Dow	Mike Kentish	1:23.9
1995	Cherokee Rose	4	Cash Asmussen	John Hammond	Sheikh Mohammed	1:25.9
1996	Mistle Cat	6	Wendyll Woods	Sean Woods	Peter Chu	1:27.5
1997	Nombre Premier	3	Gérald Mossé	Alain de Royer-Dupré	Marquesa de Moratalla	1:19.3
1998	Hidden Meadow	4	Olivier Peslier	Ian Balding	George Strawbridge	1:20.2
1999	Russian Revival	6	Ray Cochrane	John Gosden	Maktoum Al Maktoum	1:17.9
2000	Blu Air Force	3	Olivier Peslier	Bruno Grizzetti	Daniel Wildenstein	1:20.4
2001	Lunasalt	3	Olivier Peslier	André Fabre	Jean-Luc Lagardère	1:20.2
2002	Frenchmans Bay	4	Steve Drowne	Roger Charlton	Michael Pescod	1:21.7
2003	Saratan	6	Stéphane Pasquier	Mikel Delzangles	Marquesa de Moratalla	1:21.6
2004	Puppeteer	4	Christophe Soumillon	Alain de Royer-Dupré	6C Racing Ltd	1:19.8
2005	Art Master	4	Christophe Soumillon	André Fabre	Khalid Abdullah	1:18.6
2006	Satri	4	Olivier Peslier	Jean-Marie Béguigné	Enrico Ciampi	1:20.1
2007	Garnica	4	Christophe Lemaire	Jean-Claude Rouget	Edmund A. Gann	1:25.6
2008	Garnica	5	Stéphane Pasquier	David Nicholls	O'Reilly / Maher	1:21.0
2009	Dunkerque (Note: As de Trebol finished first in 2009, but he was relegated to second place following a stewards' inquiry)	4	Dominique Boeuf	Criquette Head-Maarek	Alec Head	1:19.4
2010	Dalghar	4	Christophe Lemaire	Alain de Royer-Dupré	HH Aga Khan IV	1:17.4
2011	Sahpresa	6	Grégory Benoist	Rod Collet	Teruya Yoshida	1:19.2
2012	Moonlight Cloud	4	Thierry Jarnet	Freddy Head	George Strawbridge	1:19.31
2013	Pearl Flute	3	Umberto Rispoli	Francis-Henri Graffard	Qatar Racing Ltd	1:24.36
2014	American Devil	5	Pierre-Charles Boudot	Eric Libaud	Ecurie Haras de Quetieville	1:22.53
2015	Rosso Corsa	4	Aurelien Lemaitre	Georges Mikhalidès	Mubarak Al Naemi	1:19.18
2016	Attendu (Note: The 2016 running took place at Deauville while Longchamp was closed for redevelopment)	3	Maxime Guyon	Carlos Laffon-Parias	Wertheimer et Frère	1:26.65
2017	Inns of Court (Note: The 2017 running took place at Maisons-Laffitte while Longchamp was closed for redevelopment)	3	Mickael Barzalona	André Fabre	Godolphin	1:25.43
2018	Polydream	3	Maxime Guyon	Freddy Head	Wertheimer et Frère	1:21.85
2019	Hey Gaman	4	P. J. McDonald	James Tate	Sultan Ali	1:18.60
2020	Spinning Memories (Note: The 2020 running took place at Clairefontaine due to the COVID-19 pandemic in France)	5	Christophe Soumillon	Pascal Bary	Sutong Pan Racing Bloodst	1:22.70
2021	Marianafoot	6	Mickael Barzalona	Jerome Reynier	Jean-Claude Seroul	1:19.06
2022	Egot	4	Mickael Barzalona	André Fabre	Godolphin	1:19.72
2023	Fort Payne	5	Maxime Guyon	Nicolas Caullery	Alain Jathiere, Mme Philippe Demercastel & Nicolas Caullery	1:19.17
2024	Exxtra	4	Alexis Pouchin	Carlos and Yann Lerner	Mme Anja Wilde	1:20.66
2025	Topgear	6	Stéphane Pasquier	Christopher Head	Hisaaki Saito	1:19.31
2026	Lazzat	5	Mickael Barzalona	Jerome Reynier	Wathnan Racing	1:19:12

== Earlier winners ==
- 1968: Holy Smoke
- 1969: Regent Street
- 1970: Yellow God
- 1971: Assouan
- 1972: Hadrianus
- 1973: African Sky
- 1974: Sincerely
- 1975: Dandy Lute
- 1976: Gravelines
- 1977: Diligo
- 1978: Pas de Deux
- 1979: By the Sea

== See also ==
- List of French flat horse races
