= Cherokee Rose (horse) =

Irish-bred Thoroughbred racehorse

- Sire: Dancing Brave
- Grandsire: Lyphard
- Dam: Celtic Assembly
- Damsire: Secretariat
- Sex: Mare
- Foaled: 1 March 1991
- Country: Ireland
- Colour: Bay
- Breeder: Sheikh Mohammed
- Owner: Sheikh Mohammed
- Trainer: John Hammond
- Record: 14: 5-2-2
- Earnings: £225,956

Major wins
- Prix du Palais-Royal (1995); Prix de la Porte Maillot (1995); Prix Maurice de Gheest (1995); Haydock Sprint Cup (1995)

Cherokee Rose (1 March 1991 – ca. 2012) was an Irish-bred, French-trained Thoroughbred racehorse and broodmare. She showed promise as a two-year-old in 1993 when she won one of her three races and finished a very close second in the Group Three Prix du Calvados. She failed to win in an interrupted three-year-old season. She emerged as a top class performer in 1995 when she won the Prix du Palais-Royal, Prix de la Porte Maillot, Prix Maurice de Gheest, and the Haydock Sprint Cup. After her retirement from racing she has considerable success as a dam of winners.

== Background ==
Cherokee Rose is a bay mare bred in Ireland by her owner Sheikh Mohammed. Her sire Dancing Brave was the most highly rated British racehorse of the 1980s winning a series of major races culminating in the Prix de l'Arc de Triomphe. At stud, he was a modest success, siring the Group One winners Commander in Chief, White Muzzle, Wemyss Bight and Ivanka before being sold and exported to Japan in 1991.

Cherokee Rose's dam Celtic Assembly won one minor race and finished second in the Lupe Stakes in 1984. As a broodmare she also produced Volksraad who became a leading sire in New Zealand. She was a great-granddaughter of Mesopotamia an Irish broodmare whose other female-line descendants have included Halling, Galaxy Libra (Man o' War Stakes), Balla Cove, and Just The Judge.

Sheikh Mohammed sent the filly to race in France where she was trained by John Hammond.

== Racing career ==
=== 1993: two-year-old season ===
Cherokee Rose began her racing career by finishing fourth at Compiègne on 12 July 1993 and then recorded her first success in a minor race at Vichy eighteen days later. On 29 August the filly was stepped up in class for the Group Three Prix du Calvados over 1400 metres at Deauville Racecourse and finished second, beaten a short head by Far Mist.

=== 1994: three-year-old season ===
In 1994, Cherokee Rose failed to win in four starts. She finished ninth in the Prix Amandine at Saint-Cloud Racecourse in March and sixth in the Prix de la Calonne at Deauville in April. The filly was then off the course until November when she finished third to Light Fresh Air in the Listed Prix Solitude over 1600 metres at Saint-Cloud. Later in the month over the same distance at Evry Racecourse she contested the Listed Prix Isola Bella and finished fourth, beaten two and a quarter lengths by the André Fabre-trained winner Mrs Arkada.

=== 1995: four-year-old season ===
The American jockey Cash Asmussen took over the ride on Cherokee Rose in 1995 and rode her in all seven of her races. On her debut as a four-year-old she finished third to Neverneyev and Nec Plus Ultra in the Listed Prix de Montretout over 1400 metres at Longchamp Racecourse on 7 May. Eighteen days later she contested the Group Three Prix du Palais-Royal over the same course and distance and started at odds of 5.8/1. The British filly Sayyedati started favourite ahead of Neverneyev and Poplar Bluff with Nec Plus Ultra completing the five-runner field. She turned into the straight in fourth place and made steady progress, catching Sayyedati in the final strides and winning by a head.

On 22 June, Cherokee Rose ran for the third consecutive times over Longchamp's 1400 metre course and started joint favourite with Neverneyev in the Group Three Prix de la Porte Maillot. The other three runners were Poplar Bluff, Bashaayeash (runner-up in the Prix de La Jonchere) and Sixieme Sens. The filly took the lead 200 metres out accelerated clear of her rivals to win by two and a half lengths from Bashaayeash. On 6 August at Deauville Cherokee Rose was moved up to Group One class for the first time and started the 1.7/1 favourite for the Prix Maurice de Gheest over 1300 metres. Her nine opponents were Diffident (Prix de Ris-Orangis), General Monash (Prix Robert Papin), Atticus (Prix de Fontainebleau), Nec Plus Ultra, Fard (Middle Park Stakes), Young Ern (Hungerford Stakes), Hoh Magic (Prix Morny), Wessam Prince (Benazet-Rennen) and Lavinia Fontana (Haydock Sprint Cup). Cherokee Rose raced in fourth as Lavinia Fontana set the pace before moving up into third on the turn into the straight. She overtook Lavina Fontana inside the last 200 metres and stayed on "gamely" under pressure to hold off the late challenge of Young Ern to win by a short head. After the race Hammond commented "she seems to be getting faster as she gets older".

Cherokee Rose was sent overseas for the first time when she contested the Group One Sprint Cup over six furlongs at Haydock Park in England on 2 September. The British-trained colt Lake Coniston was made 1/3 favourite after a four-length win in the July Cup with Cherokee Rose second choice in the betting on 5/1. The other four runners were the 1994 winner Lavinia Fotana, Owington, Branston Abby (Chipchase Stakes) and Mind Games (Temple Stakes). Cherokee Rose tracked the leaders Mind Games and Lake Coniston before being switched left by Asmussen to obtain a clear run approaching the final furlong. She accelerated psst her rivals in the closing stages and won "comfortably" by one and half lengths from Branston Abby.

On 1 October, Cherokee Rose was dropped in distance and started odds on favourite for the Prix de l'Abbaye over 1000 metres at Longchamp and started odds-on favourite. She struggled to match the pace of the early leaders and although she stayed on strongly in the closing stages she never looked likely to win and was beaten two and a half lengths into second by the British filly Hever Golf Rose. For her final appearance the filly was sent to the United States and moved back up in distance for the Breeders' Cup Mile at Belmont Park on 28 October. She never looked likely to win and finished eighth of the thirteen runners behind the Irish filly Ridgewood Pearl.

== Breeding record ==
Cherokee Rose was retired from racing to become a broodmare for Sheikh Mohammed's Darley Stud. She produced twelve foals and six winners between 1997 and 2012.

- Moyesii, a bay filly, foaled in 1997, sired by Diesis. Won one race, dam of Mastery and Kirklees (Gran Criterium).
- Bowman, bay colt, 1999, by Irish River. Won four races including the Prix de Fontainebleau.
- Meilland, bay colt, 2000 by Carson City. Failed to win in two races.
- Cara Bella, chestnut filly, 2001, by Seeking The Gold. Failed to win in five races. Dam of Bello (Newmarket Handicap).
- Rose Rush, chestnut colt, 2002, by King's Best
- Hint of Spring, bay filly, 2004, by Seeking The Gold. Won one race.
- Rose de France, bay filly, 2005, by Diktat. Failed to win in five races. Dam of Cable Bay (Challenge Stakes).
- Game Hunter, bay colt, 2006, by Cape Cross
- Ahtoug, bay colt, 2008, by Byron. Won six races.
- Trail of Tears, bay filly, 2009, by Exceed and Excel. Failed to win in six races.
- Gilmer, bay colt (later gelded), 2011, by Exceed and Excel. Won four races.
- Seven Clans, bay colt, 2012, by Cape Cross. Won one race. He was Cherokee Rose's last foal.

== Pedigree ==
Pedigree of Cherokee Rose (IRE) bay mare 1991
| Sire Dancing Brave (USA) 1983 | Lyphard (USA); 1969 | Northern Dancer | Nearctic |
| Sire Dancing Brave (USA) 1983 | Lyphard (USA); 1969 | Northern Dancer | Natalma |
| Sire Dancing Brave (USA) 1983 | Lyphard (USA); 1969 | Goofed | Court Martial |
| Sire Dancing Brave (USA) 1983 | Lyphard (USA); 1969 | Goofed | Barra |
| Sire Dancing Brave (USA) 1983 | Navajo Princess (USA); 1974 | Drone | Sir Gaylord |
| Sire Dancing Brave (USA) 1983 | Navajo Princess (USA); 1974 | Drone | Cap and Bells |
| Sire Dancing Brave (USA) 1983 | Navajo Princess (USA); 1974 | Olmec | Pago Pago |
| Sire Dancing Brave (USA) 1983 | Navajo Princess (USA); 1974 | Olmec | Chocolate Beau |
| Dam Celtic Assembly (USA) 1981 | Secretariat (USA); 1970 | Bold Ruler | Nasrullah |
| Dam Celtic Assembly (USA) 1981 | Secretariat (USA); 1970 | Bold Ruler | Miss Disco |
| Dam Celtic Assembly (USA) 1981 | Secretariat (USA); 1970 | Somethingroyal | Princequillo |
| Dam Celtic Assembly (USA) 1981 | Secretariat (USA); 1970 | Somethingroyal | Imperatrice |
| Dam Celtic Assembly (USA) 1981 | Welsh Garden (IRE); 1973 | Welsh Saint | St Paddy |
| Dam Celtic Assembly (USA) 1981 | Welsh Garden (IRE); 1973 | Welsh Saint | Welsh Way |
| Dam Celtic Assembly (USA) 1981 | Welsh Garden (IRE); 1973 | Garden of Eden | Exbury |
| Dam Celtic Assembly (USA) 1981 | Welsh Garden (IRE); 1973 | Garden of Eden | Mesopotamia (Family 10-c) |
