= Marianafoot =

French Thoroughbred racehorse

- Sire: Footstepsinthesand
- Grandsire: Giant's Causeway
- Dam: Marianabaa
- Damsire: Anabaa
- Sex: Stallion
- Foaled: 25 March 2015
- Country: France
- Colour: Chestnut
- Breeder: Jean-Claude Seroul
- Owner: Jean-Claude Seroul
- Trainer: Patrick Khozian; Jerome Reynier
- Record: 26: 15-3-2
- Earnings: £594,944

Major wins
- Prix Luthier (2018, 2019); Irish Thoroughbred Marketing Cup (2019); Prix Servanne (2021); Prix du Palais-Royal (2021); Prix de la Porte Maillot (2021); Prix Maurice de Gheest (2021)

Marianafoot (foaled 25 March 2015) is a retired French Thoroughbred racehorse and current breeding stallion. He won two minor races as a two-year-old in 2017 and two more races including the Listed Prix Luthier in the following year. In 2019 he won a valuable race in Qatar and a second Prix Luthier but appeared to be just below top-class as he was well-beaten when competing in Group races in Europe. After an injury disrupted 2020 campaign he emerged as a leading sprinter in the following year when he was unbeaten in seven races including the Prix Servanne, Prix du Palais-Royal, Prix de la Porte Maillot and Prix Maurice de Gheest.

== Background ==
Marianafoot is a chestnut horse with a white sock on his left hind leg bred in France by his owner Jean-Claude Seroul. The colt was initially sent into training with Patrick Khozian.

He was one of the best horses sired by Footstepsinthesand who was undefeated in a brief racing career which included the 2000 Guineas in 2005. Marianafoot's dam Marianabaa showed modest racing ability in France but did better as a broodmare, producing the Listed winner Padron. She was a distant female-line descendant of Rare Treat, an American broodmare who was the ancestor of Golden Fleece, Earthlight. Lightning Spear and Be My Guest.

== Racing career ==
=== 2017: two-year-old season ===
Marianafoot was ridden in both of his races as a two-year-old by Nicolas Perret. On his racecourse debut in the Prix de la Minadriere over 1400 metres on good to soft ground at Vichy Racecourse on 18 July he started at odds of 10.6/1 and won by half a length from Dark Side. On 2 September the colt started 11/10 favourite when he was stepped up in distance for the 1600 metres Prix des Cadets on the synthetic Polytrack surface at Cagnes-sur-Mer Racecourse and won again, beating the filly Ballet de la Reine by one and a half lengths.

=== 2018: three-year-old season ===
Marianafoot began his second campaign by finishing fifth over 1600 metres at Lyon-Parilly and then, with Perret in the saddle, won over 1400 metres on very soft ground at Toulouse on 1 June. In the summer he ran twice over 1200 metres at Deauville Racecourse running third in the Listed Prix Kistena in July and fourth when odds-on favourite for the Prix de la Huderie in August. Before his next start the horse was transferred to the training stable of Jerome Reynier. On his first run for his new trainer Marianafoot started 1.6/1 favourite for the Prix Jean de Tauriac over 1400 metres at Toulouse on 3 October and won by four and a half lengths from Diamond City. On the polytrack at Deauville on 16 December the colt started 3.8/1 second favourite for the Listed Prix Luthier over 1500 metres. Ridden by Pierre-Charles Boudot he recorded his first major win as he produced a strong late run and won by a head from Indyco.

=== 2019: four-year-old season ===
In early 2019 Marianafoot was sent to race in Qatar and on 22 February he was ridden by Boudot to a neck victory in the Irish Thoroughbred Marketing Cup over 1600 metres at Doha Racecourse. On his return to Europe the colt ran four times in high-class races over 1400 metres at Longchamp. He finished fifth to Hey Gaman in the Prix du Palais Royal in May, second to Polydream in the Prix de la Porte Maillot in July, fourth to City Light in the Prix du Pin in September and eleventh behind One Master in the Prix de la Foret in October. On his final run of the season he went off the 2.1/1 favourite as he attempted to repeat his 2018 success in the Prix Luthier at Deauville on 14 December. With Barzalona in the saddle he prevailed by one and three quarter lengths from Stunning Spirit with Indyco a further two and a half lengths back in third.

=== 2020: five-year-old season ===
In February 2020 Marianafoot returned to Qatar for a second run in the Irish Thoroughbred Marketing Cup but was beaten a short head into second place by Stunning Spirit, sustaining a joint injury in the process. He was off the track for more than nine months before returning to action in the Prix Flying Water over 1300 metres at Deauville in December. Ridden by Antonio Orani, he started the 1.2/1 favourite and won by half a length from Buridan.

=== 2021: six-year-old season ===
Marianafoot began his 2021 campaign with three races on polytrack. He made his first appearance as a six-year-old on 15 January when started odds on favourite for a minor race over 1500 metres at Marseille Pont-de-Vivaux Racecourse where he was ridden by Orani and won by two and a half lengths from J'Aurais Du. He went on to win the 1300 metre Prix Cirrus Des Aigles by three and a half lengths at Cagnes-sur-Mer in February and the Prix du Bat l'Eau over the same distance at Chantilly Racecourse in March. On 26 April Marianafoot was stepped back up to Listed class and returned to the turf for the Prix Servanne over 1200 metres at Chantilly and started the 2.5/1 second favourite in a nine-runner field. Ridden by Barzalona he recorded his fifth win in a row as he came home two and a half lengths clear of the favourite Queen of Love.

On 30 May at Longchamp Marianafoot made his second attempt to win the Prix du Palais-Royal, and went off the 1.9/1 second favourite behind the Prix du Muguet winner Duhail. Barzalona sent Marianfoot into the lead after 400 metres and the horse stayed on well to beat Duhail by a length. After the race Jerome Reynier said "Marianafoot is a lovely horse, but... he had to take it easy for nearly all of last year. But he came back maybe better than ever and we are very happy to win... He can stretch to a mile if there is enough pace, but his ideal trip could be the Prix Maurice de Gheest, six and a half furlongs on a straight course and that is why we tried him last time over the straight course at Chantilly. He has done it well so he is in great shape and we need to keep him like that to try to win a Group 1 with him.” On 1 July, over the same course and distance, Marianafoot started 1.5/1 favourite ahead of Duhail in the Prix de la Porte Maillot on very soft ground. He led from the start, went clear of his opponents 200 metres from the finish and won by one and a half lengths from Duhail despite being eased down by Barzalona in the final strides.

In the Group 1 Prix Maurice de Gheest over 1300 metres on soft ground at Deauville on 8 August, Marianafoot was partnered by Barzalona and went off the 8.9/1 third choice in the betting behind the joint-favourites Campanelle and Starman. The other nine contenders included Brando (winner of the race in 2017), Glen Shiel, Laws of Indices and Thunder Moon. After being restrained towards the rear of the field in the early stages Marianafoot began to make rapid progress entering the last 400 metres, overhauled Starman 150 metres from the finish and won by one and three quarter lengths. After the race Reynier said: "The plan really worked beautifully. Over this distance we wanted to attack in the final 100 metres because we know he stays further and some of the others are pure sprinters. We won't rush to decide [on his next race], but he'll stay up here and he could run in the Prix Jacques le Marois, depending on how he comes out of this and how the race shapes up."

Reynier opted to give Marianafoot a break before bringing him back in autumn for the Prix de la Foret but the horse was withdrawn from the race owing to the unsuitable ground conditions.

=== 2022: seven-year-old season ===
Marianafoot began his 2022 campaign by attempting to reproduce his success of the previous year in the Prix Cirrus des Aigles at Cagnes on 11 February but although he started favourite he sustained his first defeat in almost two years as he came home third behind King Gold and Elusive Foot. He failed to reproduce his six-year-old form in his next two starts as he finished sixth behind Prince Lancelot in the Prix Servanne and then ran second to Egot in the Prix du Palais-Royal.

== Breeding career ==
Following his retirement, Marianafoot stood at Haras De Saint-Vincent, starting 2023. For the 2024 breeding season, Marianafoot move from Haras de Saint-Vincent to Haras des Faunes was announced in September 2023.

== Pedigree ==
Pedigree of Marianafoot (FR), chestnut stallion, 2015
Sire Footstepsinthesand (GB) 2002	Giant's Causeway (USA); 1997	Storm Cat	Storm Bird (CAN)
Sire Footstepsinthesand (GB) 2002	Giant's Causeway (USA); 1997	Storm Cat	Terlingua
Sire Footstepsinthesand (GB) 2002	Giant's Causeway (USA); 1997	Mariah's Storm	Rahy
Sire Footstepsinthesand (GB) 2002	Giant's Causeway (USA); 1997	Mariah's Storm	Immense
Sire Footstepsinthesand (GB) 2002	Glatisant (GB); 1991	Rainbow Quest (USA)	Blushing Groom (FR)
Sire Footstepsinthesand (GB) 2002	Glatisant (GB); 1991	Rainbow Quest (USA)	I Will Follow
Sire Footstepsinthesand (GB) 2002	Glatisant (GB); 1991	Dancing Rocks	Green Dancer
Sire Footstepsinthesand (GB) 2002	Glatisant (GB); 1991	Dancing Rocks	Croda Rossa (ITY)
Dam Marianabaa (FR) 2009	Anabaa (USA); 1992	Danzig	Northern Dancer (CAN)
Dam Marianabaa (FR) 2009	Anabaa (USA); 1992	Danzig	Pas de Nom
Dam Marianabaa (FR) 2009	Anabaa (USA); 1992	Balbonella (FR)	Gay Mecene (USA)
Dam Marianabaa (FR) 2009	Anabaa (USA); 1992	Balbonella (FR)	Bamieres
Dam Marianabaa (FR) 2009	Maria Gabriella (IRE); 2004	Rock of Gibraltar	Danehill (USA)
Dam Marianabaa (FR) 2009	Maria Gabriella (IRE); 2004	Rock of Gibraltar	Offshore Boom
Dam Marianabaa (FR) 2009	Maria Gabriella (IRE); 2004	Celestial Lagoon (JPN)	Sunday Silence (USA)
Dam Marianabaa (FR) 2009	Maria Gabriella (IRE); 2004	Celestial Lagoon (JPN)	Metaphor (USA) (Family: 8-c)
