= Footstepsinthesand =

British-bred Thoroughbred racehorse

- Racing colours of Michael Tabor
- Sire: Giant's Causeway
- Dam: Glatisant
- Sex: Stallion
- Foaled: 15 February 2002
- Country: Great Britain
- Colour: Bay
- Breeder: Hascombe and Valiant Stud
- Owner: Michael Tabor & Sue Magnier
- Trainer: Aidan O'Brien
- Record: 3: 3-0-0
- Earnings: £226,451

Major wins
- Killavullan Stakes (2004); 2000 Guineas Stakes (2005)
- Last updated on 21 June 2007

Footstepsinthesand (foaled 15 February 2002) is a retired, undefeated Thoroughbred racehorse and active sire who was bred in the United Kingdom but trained during his racing career in Ireland. He won both his races as a two-year-old in 2004 and won the 2000 Guineas Stakes at Newmarket on his three-year-old debut in 2005. Footstepsinthesand sustained an injury during the race and never ran again, retiring to stud undefeated after a career of only three races.

== Background ==
Footstepsinthesand is a bay horse standing 16.1 hands high, bred at Cheveley, near Newmarket, Suffolk by Anthony Oppenheimer's Hascombe and Valiant Stud. He was one of the first foals sired by the European Horse of the Year Giant's Causeway out of the mare Glatisant.

Giant's Causeway has sired the winners of over 300 races, including the winners of 26 Group One/Grade I races. His most successful progeny include Aragorn, Shamardal and Eskendereya. Glatisant, who was bred and raced by Philip Oppenheimer was a successful racehorse who won the Prestige Stakes at Goodwood in 1993. Footstepsinthesand is inbred 3x4 to the stallion Blushing Groom. This means that Blushing Groom appears in both the third and fourth generations of his pedigree, see below

As a yearling Footstepsinthesand was sent to the Tattersalls October sales where he was bought for 170,000gns by the bloodstock agent Dermot "Demi" O'Byrne acting on behalf of Michael Tabor. The colt was sent into training with Aidan O'Brien at Ballydoyle.

== Racing career ==
=== 2004: two-year-old season ===
Footstepsinthesand's two-year-old career consisted of two races, run eight days apart in October 2004. He made his debut in a twenty-runner maiden race at Naas in which he started favourite at 3/1, just ahead of his stable companion Olympic. Ridden by Colm O'Donoghue Footstepsinthesand led from the start and pulled away in the last two furlongs to record an "impressive" four and a half length win, despite being eased down in the closing stages.

He was then immediately moved up to Group Three standard for the Killavullan Stakes at Leopardstown. Despite the race attracting representatives from the leading Irish stables of John Oxx, Dermot Weld and Jim Bolger, O'Brien's colt was sent off the odds-on favourite. Footstepsinthesand was positioned in second place by Jamie Spencer before being sent to the lead entering the straight. He soon went clear and ran on to win "comfortably" by two lengths from Gaff, with the rest of the field a further seven lengths back. Immediately after the race, bookmakers offered a price of 25/1 for the following year's 2000 Guineas.

=== 2005: three-year-old season ===
In 2005 Footstepsinthesand was sent straight for the 2000 Guineas Stakes without a prep race. He did however, attract attention in the buildup to the race: he was the selected mount of O'Brien's new stable jockey Kieren Fallon in exercise, and later reports from Ballydoyle claimed that he was "burning up" the gallops in training.

Footstepsinthesand was made 13/2 third favourite behind two other unbeaten colts; Dubawi representing the Godolphin team and the Michael Stoute-trained Rob Roy. Ridden by Kieren Fallon Footstepsinthesand raced keenly down the centre of the Rowley Mile course before taking the lead a furlong and a half from the finish. Although he drifted to the left in the closing stages he was not seriously challenged and won by one and three quarter lengths from Rebel Rebel, with Kandidate third.

Commenting on the race, the Independent called the winner "an outstanding individual, full of quality and vitality", while pointing out that the placed horses were unknown outsiders, making the value of the form questionable. The bookmakers responded by making Footstepsinthesand 6-1 joint-favourite for The Derby.

Footstepsinthesand returned from the race with a foot injury, later described as a "stone bruise". The injury did not respond to treatment and his retirement was announced in June. Announcing his retirement, Footstepsinthesand's owners said in a statement: "A niggling problem with the foot he bruised on the very fast ground at Newmarket has forced Footstepsinthesand's premature retirement. Although nothing major, the injury requires rest, which would rule him out of the summer's major mile events."

== Assessment ==
In the 2005 World Thoroughbred Racehorse Rankings Footstepsinthesand was given a rating of 116, fourteen pounds below the topweight Hurricane Run.

== Stud career ==
Footstepsinthesand retired to stand for his owners' Coolmore Stud. His early retirement meant that he was able to begin his stud career at Coolmore's Australian base in the Hunter Region, New South Wales in 2005 before being shuttled back to their Irish base at Fethard, County Tipperary for the Northern Hemisphere breeding season. He was also shuttled to stand at Haras La Mission in Argentina in 2007.

His stud fee for 2011 was €10,000.

He has produced eight Group winners from his first two crops including the Group One winners Shamalgan (Premio Vittorio di Capua) and Chachamaidee (Matron Stakes).

=== Notable progeny ===
c = colt, f = filly, g = gelding

Foaled	Name	Sex	Major wins
2007	Chachamaidee	f	Matron Stakes
2007	Shamalgan	c	Premio Vittorio di Capua
2007	Pure Champion	c	Windsor Park Plate
2015	Marianafoot	c	Prix Maurice de Gheest

== Pedigree ==
Pedigree of Footstepsinthesand (GB), bay stallion, 2002
Sire Giant's Causeway (USA) 1997	Storm Cat (USA); 1983	Storm Bird	Northern Dancer
Sire Giant's Causeway (USA) 1997	Storm Cat (USA); 1983	Storm Bird	South Ocean
Sire Giant's Causeway (USA) 1997	Storm Cat (USA); 1983	Terlingua	Secretariat
Sire Giant's Causeway (USA) 1997	Storm Cat (USA); 1983	Terlingua	Crimson Saint
Sire Giant's Causeway (USA) 1997	Mariah's Storm (USA); 1991	Rahy	Blushing Groom*
Sire Giant's Causeway (USA) 1997	Mariah's Storm (USA); 1991	Rahy	Glorious Song
Sire Giant's Causeway (USA) 1997	Mariah's Storm (USA); 1991	Immense	Roberto
Sire Giant's Causeway (USA) 1997	Mariah's Storm (USA); 1991	Immense	Imsodear
Dam Glatisant (GB) 1991	Rainbow Quest (USA); 1981	Blushing Groom*	Red God
Dam Glatisant (GB) 1991	Rainbow Quest (USA); 1981	Blushing Groom*	Runaway Bride
Dam Glatisant (GB) 1991	Rainbow Quest (USA); 1981	I Will Follow	Herbager
Dam Glatisant (GB) 1991	Rainbow Quest (USA); 1981	I Will Follow	Where You Lead
Dam Glatisant (GB) 1991	Dancing Rocks (GB); 1979	Green Dancer	Nijinsky
Dam Glatisant (GB) 1991	Dancing Rocks (GB); 1979	Green Dancer	Green Valley
Dam Glatisant (GB) 1991	Dancing Rocks (GB); 1979	Croda Rossa	Grey Sovereign
Dam Glatisant (GB) 1991	Dancing Rocks (GB); 1979	Croda Rossa	Crenelle (Family: 1-e)

- Footstepsinthesand is inbred 3x4 to the stallion Blushing Groom.
