= Sahpresa =

American-bred Thoroughbred racehorse

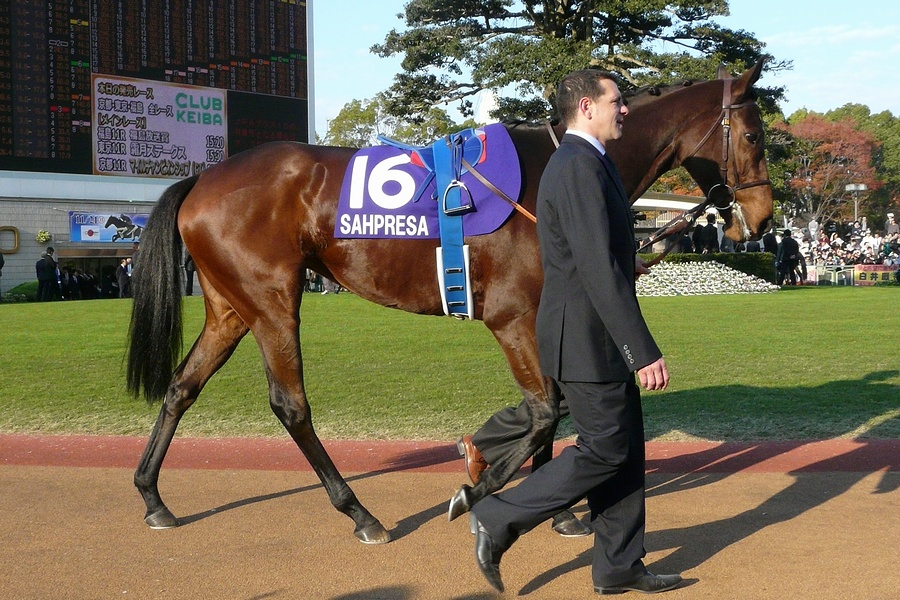
- Sahpresa in 2010
- Sire: Sahm
- Grandsire: Mr. Prospector
- Dam: Sorpresa
- Damsire: Pleasant Tap
- Sex: Mare
- Foaled: 11 February 2005
- Died: 23 March 2020 (aged 15)
- Country: United States
- Colour: Bay
- Breeder: Douglas McIntyre
- Owner: Douglas McIntyre; Teruya Yoshida
- Trainer: Rod Collet
- Record: 22:8-4-5
- Earnings: £1,267,556

Major wins
- Sun Chariot Stakes (2009, 2010, 2011); Prix du Pin (2010); Prix du Palais-Royal (2011)

Sahpresa (11 February 2005-23 March 2020) is an American-bred, French-trained Thoroughbred racehorse and broodmare best known for winning three consecutive runnings of the Group One Sun Chariot Stakes at Newmarket Racecourse. Sahpresa was unraced as a two-year-old, but raced until the age of six, winning eight of her twenty-two races. Apart from the Sun Chariot Stakes she won the Prix du Pin in 2010 and the Prix du Palais-Royal in 2011. She also competed in Asia, where she picked up large sums in place money when finishing third in Mile Championship (twice) and the Hong Kong Mile. She was retired from racing at the end of the 2011 season.

== Background ==
Sahpresa is a bay mare with a white star bred in Pennsylvania by her owner Douglas McIntyre. Her sire Sahm, was a useful but unexceptional racehorse horse whose most notable effort came when he was disqualified after finishing second in the Vintage Stakes at Goodwood Racecourse in 1996. He did, however, have an exceptional pedigree, being a son of the influential American stallion Mr. Prospector out of Salsabil an Irish-bred racemare whose wins included the 1000 Guineas, Epsom Oaks and Irish Derby in 1990. Sahpresa's dam Sorpresa, was an unraced daughter of the American Champion Older Male Horse Pleasant Tap.

McIntyre sent his filly to France to be trained by Rodolphe "Rod" Collet at Lamorlaye.

== Racing career ==
=== 2008: three-year-old season ===
Sahpresa did not race as a two-year-old, and made her racecourse debut on 29 July when she won the Prix Faucheur over 1,600 metres at Maisons-Laffitte Racecourse by eight lengths. In September she finished third in a race at Longchamp Racecourse and then moved up in class and won the Listed Prix Coronation at Saint-Cloud by six lengths. On her final start of the season she was sent to England to take on colts and older horses in the Darley Stakes at Newmarket. Ridden by Kevin Manning, she started slowly but made progress in the closing stages to finish fourth behind the 50/1 outsider Charlie Farnsbarns.

=== 2009: four-year-old season ===
Sahpresa began her four-year-old season by winning the Listed Prix de Montretout at Longchamp in May and then finished second to the British-trained gelding Beacon Lodge in the Prix du Chemin de Fer du Nord at Chantilly in June. In August she was moved up to Group One class for the first time and finished fourth to Goldikova in the Prix Rothschild at Deauville Racecourse. Later that month she finished second, beaten three-quarters of a length by Racinger in the Prix Quincey over the same course and distance.

On 3 October, Sahpresa ran in England for the second time when she was one of eight fillies to contest the Sun Chariot Stakes over the Rowley Mile at Newmarket. She was given little chance in the betting, starting at odds of 16/1, with the 1000 Guineas winner Ghanaati being made the 6/5 favourite. Ridden by the Irish jockey Ted Durcan, Sahpresa was always among the leaders, took the lead inside the final furlong, and won by one and a half lengths from Ghanaati, with Spacious in third. Sahpresa was then sent to Japan for the Mile Championship at Kyoto Racecourse on 22 November. She finished strongly to finish third of the eighteen runners, one and a half lengths behind the locally trained winner Company.

=== 2010: five-year-old season ===
Sahpresa did not appear as a five-year-old until June, when she finished eighth of the ten runners behind Strawberrydaiquiri in the Windsor Forest Stakes at Royal Ascot. She did not race again until September, when she contested the Group Three Prix du Pin over 1,400 metres at Longchamp. Ridden by Christophe Soumillon she was positioned behind the leaders before being switched to the outside in the straight. She took the lead 100 metres from the finish and won comfortably by one and a half lengths from Dalghar. Soumillon was again in the saddle when Sahpresa ran in her second Sun Chariot Stakes on 2 October. Racing on soft ground and starting at odds of 9/2 she was restrained at the back of the eleven runners before moving up to take the lead inside the final furlong. She won "readily" by one and three-quarter lengths from Strawberrydaiquiri and Rainfall. Collet called her performance "very impressive, maybe even more than last year I think."

After her win at Newmarket the mare was sold privately and entered the ownership of Teruya Yoshida. In November she again contested the Mile Championship and finished fourth in a four-way photo-finish with A Shin Forward, Danon Yoyo and Gorski. In December at Sha Tin Racecourse she finished third to Beauty Flash in the Hong Kong Mile, with the beaten horses including A Shin Forward, Good Ba Ba and Paco Boy.

=== 2011: six-year-old season ===
On her first appearance of 2011, Sahpresa was matched against the leading three-year-old filly Moonlight Cloud in the Prix du Palais-Royal at Longchamp in June. Ridden by Gregory Benoist, Sahpresa was held up at the back of the field before making rapid progress in the straight. She overtook Moonlicght Cloud in the closing strides and won "easily" by one and a half lengths. In July, Sahpresa finished second to Timepiece in the Falmouth Stakes at Newmarket and then returned to France for the Prix Rothschild in which she faced Goldikova for the first time in two years. Held up as usual, Sahpresa finished strongly but was unable to catch Goldikova, finishing second by a short neck with Timepiece in third. In the Prix Jacques Le Marois Sahpresa was only a nose behind Goldikova, as the two finished second and third behind Immortal Verse, a three-year-old filly trained by Rod Collet's father Robert Collet.

Christophe-Patrice Lemaire took the ride when Sahpresa attempted to win her third Sun Chariot Stakes on 24 September. She started 13/8 favourite in a field which included her old rivals Strawberrydaiquiri and Timepiece. The mare took the lead in the final quarter mile and ran on well in the closing stages to win by a length from the four-year-old Chachamaidee. Collet explained that he had asked for the filly to be ridden more aggressively after she had been unsuited by the slow pace in the Falmouth Stakes. For the third time, Sahpresa followed up her win at Newmarket by traveling to Japan for the Mile Championship: on this occasion she finished third, beaten a neck and one and a half lengths by Eishin Apollon and Fifth Petal. She ended her career in the Hong Kong Mile in December, when she failed to reproduce her best form and finished eighth behind Able One.

== Assessment and honours ==
In the 2009 edition of the World Thoroughbred Racehorse Rankings, Sahpresa was given a rating of 118, making her the 87th best racehorse in the world and the third best older female on turf in the Mile division, behind Goldikova and Vodka. Sahpresa retained her 118 rating in 2010, placing her 95th in the world and second to Goldikova in her division. In the 2011 rankings, Sahpresa again received a mark of 118, placing her 99th in the world and third to Goldikova and More Joyous among older females in the turf Mile division.

== Stud record ==
At the end of the 2011 season, Sahpresa was retired from racing to become a broodmare at Yoshida's Shadai Farm in Hokkaido. She produced two fillies by Victoire Pisa and Deep Impact in 2013 and 2014. Her 2017 colt Satono Impresa won the Mainichi Hai in 2020.

The Japanese Studbook Database listed Sahpresa as having died on 23 March, 2020.

== Pedigree ==
Pedigree of Sahpresa (USA), bay mare, 2005
| Sire Sahm (USA) 1994 | Mr. Prospector (USA); 1970 | Raise a Native | Native Dancer |
| Sire Sahm (USA) 1994 | Mr. Prospector (USA); 1970 | Raise a Native | Raise You |
| Sire Sahm (USA) 1994 | Mr. Prospector (USA); 1970 | Gold Digger | Nashua |
| Sire Sahm (USA) 1994 | Mr. Prospector (USA); 1970 | Gold Digger | Sequence |
| Sire Sahm (USA) 1994 | Salsabil (IRE); 1987 | Sadler's Wells | Northern Dancer |
| Sire Sahm (USA) 1994 | Salsabil (IRE); 1987 | Sadler's Wells | Fairy Bridge |
| Sire Sahm (USA) 1994 | Salsabil (IRE); 1987 | Flame of Tara | Artaius |
| Sire Sahm (USA) 1994 | Salsabil (IRE); 1987 | Flame of Tara | Welsh Flame |
| Dam Sorpresa (USA) 1996 | Pleasant Tap (USA); 1987 | Pleasant Colony | His Majesty |
| Dam Sorpresa (USA) 1996 | Pleasant Tap (USA); 1987 | Pleasant Colony | Sun Colony |
| Dam Sorpresa (USA) 1996 | Pleasant Tap (USA); 1987 | Never Knock | Stage Door Johnny |
| Dam Sorpresa (USA) 1996 | Pleasant Tap (USA); 1987 | Never Knock | Never Hula |
| Dam Sorpresa (USA) 1996 | Dubiously (USA); 1985 | Jolie Jo | Round Table |
| Dam Sorpresa (USA) 1996 | Dubiously (USA); 1985 | Jolie Jo | Jolie Deja |
| Dam Sorpresa (USA) 1996 | Dubiously (USA); 1985 | Skeptic Lady | Olden Times |
| Dam Sorpresa (USA) 1996 | Dubiously (USA); 1985 | Skeptic Lady | Mysterious Lady (Family: 11-a) |
