= Prix de Meautry =

Flat horse race in France

- Class: Group 3
- Location: Deauville Racecourse; Deauville, France
- Inaugurated: 1877
- Race type: Flat / Thoroughbred
- Sponsor: Lucien Barrière
- Website: france-galop.com

Race information
- Distance: 1,200 metres (6f)
- Surface: Turf
- Track: Straight
- Qualification: Three-years-old and up
- Weight: 56½ kg (3yo); 58 kg (4yo+); Allowances; 1½ kg for fillies and mares Penalties; 3 kg for Group 1 winners * 2 kg for Group 2 winners * 3 kg if two Group 3 wins * 1 kg if one Group 3 win * * since January 1
- Purse: €80,000 (2021); 1st: €40,000

Prix de Meautry
2024
| Spycatcher | James's Delight | Beauvatier |

Previous years
2023
Mill Stream | Garrus | Batwan
2022
Bouttemont | Loubeisien | Le Cadeau
2021
Garrus | Duhail | Coeur De Pierre

2020-2011
2020
Breathtaking Look | Air De Valse | Marieta
2019
Spinning Memories | Stake Acclaim | Tertius
2018
Tantheem | Laugh A Minute | Coeur De Beaute
2017
Signs Of Blessing | Finsbury Square | Spiritfix
2016
Finsbury Square | Walec | Lord Of The Land
2015
Suedois | The Right Man | Queen Bee
2014
Coulsty | Gammarth | Robert Le Diable
2013
Myasun | Tulips | Dibajj
2012
Jimmy Styles | Gammarth | Mariol
2011
Marchand D'Or | Definightly | Le Valentin

2010-2001
2010
Swiss Diva | Kachgai | Tiza
2009
Mariol | Contest | Tayseer
2008
Tiza | Inxile | Mariol
2007
Garnica | Le Cadre Noir | Tiza
2006
Indian Maiden | Eisteddfod | Ratio
2005
Eisteddfod | Andronikos | Ratio
2004
Star Valley | Swedish Shave | Striking Ambition
2003
Blanche | Zinziberine | Crystal Castle
2002
Crystal Castle | Swedish Shave | Danger Over
2001
Do The Honours | Invincible Spirit | Hot Tin Roof

2000-1990
2000
Three Points | Danger Over | Mount Abu
1999
Vision Of Night | Sampower Star | Nuclear Debate
1998
Andreyev | My Best Valentine | Fairly Grey
1997
Pas De Reponse | Linoise | Hever Golf Rose
1996
Kistena | Titus Livius | Bashaayeash
1995
Missed Flight | Warning Star | Alzianah
1994
Lake Coniston | First Trump | Spain Lane
1993
Monde Bleu | Crack Regiment | Three For Fantasy
1992
Twafeaj | Thourios | Amigo Menor
1991
Feenpark | Ganges | Danzante
1990
Pole Position | Pharaoh's Delight | Tod

The Prix de Meautry is a Group 3 flat horse race in France open to thoroughbreds aged three years or older. It is run at Deauville over a distance of 1,200 metres (about 6 furlongs), and it is scheduled to take place each year in August.

== History ==
The event is named after Haras de Meautry, a successful stud farm located near Deauville. It was established in 1877, and was initially contested over 900 metres. It was extended to 1,000 metres in 1887.

The race was abandoned throughout World War I, with no running from 1914 to 1918. A new distance of 1,200 metres was introduced in 1922.

Deauville Racecourse was closed during World War II, and the Prix de Meautry was cancelled in 1940. For the remainder of this period it was switched between Maisons-Laffitte (1941–43, 1945) and Longchamp (1944). The Longchamp edition was run over a length of 1,300 metres.

== Records ==
Most successful horse (4 wins):

- Cricket Ball – 1986, 1987, 1988, 1989

Leading jockey (10 wins):

- Roger Poincelet – Fine Art (1946), Djama (1947), Damnos (1948), Abis (1949), Djebe (1950), Sanguine (1951), Bibi Toori (1952), Anne d'Anjou (1958), L'Epinay (1961), First Date (1967)

Leading trainer (5 wins):

- James C. Watson – Ferrieres (1897), Girasol (1903), Volte Face (1905), Syphon (1906, 1907)

Leading owner (4 wins):

- Daniel Wildenstein – Mismaloya (1969), El Rastro (1973), Pole Position (1990), Monde Bleu (1993)
- Robin Scully – Cricket Ball (1986, 1987, 1988, 1989)

== Winners since 1980 ==
| Year | Winner | Age | Jockey | Trainer | Owner | Time |
|---|---|---|---|---|---|---|
| 1980 | Kilijaro | 4 | Alain Lequeux | Olivier Douieb | Serge Fradkoff |
| 1981 | Rabdan | 4 | Gary W. Moore | Robert Armstrong | Robert Sangster |
| 1982 | Great Eastern | 5 | Gary W. Moore | John Dunlop | Mrs A. J. Struthers |
| 1983 | Maximova | 3 | Freddy Head | Criquette Head | Haras d'Etreham | 1:09.00 |
| 1984 | Celestial Dancer | 5 | Edward Hide | Tony Hide | R. K. Gunn | 1:09.90 |
| 1985 | Breath Taking | 3 | Freddy Head | Criquette Head | Robert Sangster | 1:11.70 |
| 1986 | Cricket Ball | 3 | Gary W. Moore | John Fellows | Robin Scully | 1:11.50 |
| 1987 | Cricket Ball | 4 | Guy Guignard | John Fellows | Robin Scully | 1:11.60 |
| 1988 | Cricket Ball | 5 | Gérald Mossé | John Fellows | Robin Scully | 1:10.60 |
| 1989 | Cricket Ball | 6 | Gérald Mossé | John Fellows | Robin Scully | 1:12.20 |
| 1990 | Pole Position | 3 | Dominique Boeuf | André Fabre | Daniel Wildenstein | 1:15.60 |
| 1991 | Feenpark | 6 | Ralf Malinowski | Herbert Cohn | Gestüt Olympia | 1:10.90 |
| 1992 | Twafeaj | 3 | Walter Swinburn | Ben Hanbury | Abdulla Buhaleeba | 1:14.00 |
| 1993 | Monde Bleu | 5 | Dominique Boeuf | André Fabre | Daniel Wildenstein | 1:12.50 |
| 1994 | Lake Coniston | 3 | Paul Eddery | Geoff Lewis | Highclere Racing Ltd | 1:12.80 |
| 1995 | Missed Flight | 5 | George Duffield | Chris Wall | Walter Grubmuller | 1:12.90 |
| 1996 | Kistena | 3 | Romuald Libert | Criquette Head | Wertheimer et Frère | 1:10.50 |
| 1997 | Pas de Reponse | 3 | Olivier Doleuze | Criquette Head | Wertheimer et Frère | 1:13.10 |
| 1998 | Andreyev | 4 | Darryll Holland | Richard Hannon Sr. | Jonathan Palmer-Brown | 1:09.80 |
| 1999 | Vision of Night | 3 | Pat Eddery | John Dunlop | Hesmonds Stud |
| 2000 | Three Points | 3 | Pat Eddery | John Dunlop | Hesmonds Stud | 1:10.10 |
| 2001 | Do the Honours | 3 | Frankie Dettori | Henri-Alex Pantall | Sheikh Mohammed | 1:09.50 |
| 2002 | Crystal Castle | 4 | Yutaka Take | John Hammond | John Raw | 1:12.40 |
| 2003 | Blanche | 4 | Christophe Lemaire | Jacques Rossi | Ecurie du Sud | 1:13.60 |
| 2004 | Star Valley | 4 | Ioritz Mendizabal | Jean-Claude Rouget | Antonio Caro | 1:13.00 |
| 2005 | Eisteddfod | 4 | Christophe Soumillon | Paul Cole | Elite Racing Club | 1:12.50 |
| 2006 | Indian Maiden | 6 | Thierry Thulliez | Malcolm Saunders | Scott / Hall | 1:13.80 |
| 2007 | Garnica | 4 | Christophe Lemaire | Jean-Claude Rouget | Edmund Gann | 1:12.20 |
| 2008 | Tiza | 6 | Christophe Soumillon | Alain de Royer-Dupré | Seroul / Plersch | 1:09.90 |
| 2009 | Mariol | 6 | Christophe Lemaire | Robert Collet | Vidal Family | 1:08.40 |
| 2010 | Swiss Diva | 4 | Ioritz Mendizabal | David Elsworth | Lordship Stud | 1:11.90 |
| 2011 | Marchand d'Or | 8 | Davy Bonilla | Mikel Delzangles | Carla Giral | 1:12.10 |
| 2012 | Jimmy Styles | 8 | Gérald Mossé | Clive Cox | Powell / Ridgers | 1:10.40 |
| 2013 | Myasun | 6 | Olivier Peslier | Christian Baillet | Ecurie Jarlan | 1:10.14 |
| 2014 | Coulsty | 3 | Olivier Peslier | Richard Hannon Jr. | Lord Vestey | 1:13.86 |
| 2015 | Suedois | 4 | Gregory Benoist | Christian Baillet | Elisabeth Vidal | 1:12.56 |
| 2016 | Finsbury Square | 4 | Christophe Soumillon | Fabrice Chappet | Berend Van Dalfsen | 1:09.71 |
| 2017 | Signs of Blessing | 6 | Stéphane Pasquier | François Rohaut | Mme Isabelle Corbani | 1:08.96 |
| 2018 | Tantheem | 3 | Aurelien Lemaitre | Freddy Head | Hamdan Al Maktoum | 1:09.49 |
| 2019 | Spinning Memories | 4 | Christophe Soumillon | Pascal Bary | Pan Sutong | 1:08.92 |
| 2020 | Breathtaking Look | 5 | Pierre-Charles Boudot | Stuart Williams | J W Parry | 1:14.63 |
| 2021 | Garrus | 5 | Ioritz Mendizabal | Charles Hills | Mrs Susan Roy | 1:09.23 |
| 2022 | Bouttemont | 4 | Grégory Benoist | Yann Barberot | Philippe Allaire | 1:08.90 |
| 2023 | Mill Stream | 3 | Marco Ghiani | Jane Chapple-Hyam | P W Harris | 1:11.53 |
| 2024 | Spycatcher | 6 | Clifford Lee | Karl Burke | Highclere T'Bredracing-Adriana Zaefferer | 1:12.30 |
| 2025 | Rosy Affair | 4 | Billy Loughnane | George Boughey | Shapoor Mistry | 1:9.84 |

== Earlier winners ==
- 1877: Pensacola
- 1878: Porcelaine
- 1879: Telegramme
- 1880: Sorbe
- 1881: Bienveillante
- 1882: Comte Alfred
- 1883: Conquerant
- 1884: Conquerant
- 1885: Bonbon
- 1886: Prudence
- 1887: Frapotel
- 1888:
- 1889: Lugano
- 1890: War Dance
- 1891: Reveille
- 1892: C'est Sa Soeur
- 1893: Hoche
- 1894: Arnica
- 1895: Beatrix
- 1896: Sheridan
- 1897: Ferrieres
- 1898: Railleur
- 1899: Railleur
- 1900: Listo
- 1901:
- 1902: Alatri
- 1903: Girasol
- 1904:
- 1905: Volte Face
- 1906: Syphon
- 1907: Syphon
- 1908: Gourbi
- 1909: Syphon
- 1910: Lorlette
- 1911: Jarretiere
- 1912: Jarretiere
- 1913: Pantagruel
- 1914–18: no race
- 1919: Assyrienne
- 1920: Glorious
- 1921: Dolphin
- 1922: Zapanie
- 1923: Niceas
- 1924: Sainte Hermine
- 1925: Millet
- 1926: Pacific
- 1927: Madeline
- 1928: Panuco
- 1929: Sediranda
- 1930: Slipper
- 1931: Alluvial
- 1932: Cake Walk
- 1933: Mlle d'Argagnan
- 1934: Makila
- 1935: Hajiri
- 1936: Limac
- 1937: Mandoline
- 1938: Miraculeux
- 1939: Antineus
- 1940: no race
- 1941: Boga
- 1942: Branka
- 1943: Dogat
- 1944: Fanatique
- 1945: Vagabond
- 1946: Fine Art
- 1947: Djama
- 1948: Damnos
- 1949: Abis
- 1950: Djebe
- 1951: Sanguine
- 1952: Bibi Toori
- 1953: Alypat
- 1954: Vamarie
- 1955:
- 1956: Verrieres
- 1957: Midget
- 1958: Anne d'Anjou
- 1959: Edellic
- 1960: Tanata
- 1961: L'Épinay
- 1962: Fortino
- 1963: Ligonier
- 1964: Takawalk
- 1965: Takawalk
- 1966:
- 1967: First Date
- 1968:
- 1969: Mismaloya
- 1970: Balidar
- 1971: No Mercy
- 1972: Some Hand
- 1973: El Rastro
- 1974: Flirting Around
- 1975: Street Light
- 1976: Girl Friend
- 1977: Girl Friend
- 1978: King of Macedon
- 1979: King of Macedon

== See also ==
- List of French flat horse races
