= Prix du Pin =

Flat horse race in France

- Class: Group 3
- Location: Longchamp Racecourse; Paris, France
- Inaugurated: 1883
- Race type: Flat / Thoroughbred
- Website: france-galop.com

Race information
- Distance: 1,400 metres (7f)
- Surface: Turf
- Track: Right-handed
- Qualification: Three-years-old and up exc. G2 winners this year
- Weight: 56 kg (3yo); 57 kg (4yo+); Allowances; 1½ kg for fillies and mares Penalties; 2 kg for G3 winners this year
- Purse: €80,000 (2021); 1st: €40,000

Prix du Pin
2025
Roshvar	Poet Master	Siam Paragon

Previous years
2024
Topgear	Ten Bob Tony	Dark Trooper
2023
Fang	Dabawa	National Service
2022
Fang	Ever Given	Go Athletico
2021
Sagamiyra	Axdavali	Speak Of The Devil

2020-2011
2020
Earthlight	Tropbeau	Manjeer
2019
City Light	Graignes	Larchmont Lad
2018
Tornibush	Spaday	Inns Of Court
2017
Karar	Empire Of The Star	Dame Du Roi
2016
Jallota	Attendu	Karar
2015
Taniyar	La Berma	Ride Like The Wind
2014
Bamiyan	Another Party	American Devil
2013
Desert Blanc	Mayyadah	Sommerabend
2012
Blue Soave	So Long Malpic	Kendam
2011
Best Dating	Evaporation	Sommerabend

2010-2001
2010
Sahpresa	Dalghar	Evaporation
2009
Proviso	Varenar	Emergency
2008
Captain's Lover	Spirito Del Vento	Alnadana
2007
Sabana Perdida	King Jock	Bertranicus
2006
Price Tag	Gwenseb	Helios Quercus
2005
Coupe De Champe	Mirabilis	Silent Name
2004
Comete	Puppeteer	Keltos
2003
Etoile Montante	Star Valley	Bezrin
2002
Cayoke	Sforza	Avranches
2001
Amonita	Dionello	Greengroom

2000-1991
2000
Touch Of The Blues	Silver Desert	Acerbic
1999
Midnight Foxtrot	King Country	Berkoutchi
1998
Alamo Bay	Anntari	Yulara
1997
Vert Val	Alamo Bay	Keos
1996
Zarannda	Winning Smile	Naninja
1995
Poplar Bluff	Young Ern	Nec Plus Ultra
1994
Neverneyev	Nec Plus Ultra	Firm Friend
1993
Sharp Prod	Acteur Francais	Neverneyev
1992
Kenbu	Voleris	Celtic River
1991
Hello Pink	Monde Bleu	Pro Sugar

The Prix du Pin is a Group 3 flat horse race in France open to thoroughbreds aged three years or older. It is run at Longchamp over a distance of 1,400 metres (about 7 furlongs), and it is scheduled to take place each year in September.

== History ==
The event takes its name from France's oldest horse breeding establishment, located at Le Pin-au-Haras in Orne. The stud farm's construction was authorised by Louis XIV in 1715, and the first horses it accommodated were transferred from the previous Royal Stud at Saint-Léger-en-Yvelines in 1717.

The Prix du Pin was introduced at Chantilly in 1883. It was run over 3,000 metres in late October, and was initially designed to test the aptitudes of horses for carrying unusually high weights. The burden for four-year-olds was 78½ kg (173 lb), while that for older horses was 80 kg (176 lb). It was cut to 2,000 metres in 1904.

The event was cancelled in 1906 as an indirect result of public disorder at Longchamp. Three meetings were switched to Chantilly, and to make way for the extra races the Prix du Pin was dropped. It was moved to Longchamp and restored to 3,000 metres the following year. It was abandoned throughout World War I, with no running from 1914 to 1918.

The original conditions were maintained until 1928. From this point the basic weight for horses aged four or older was 60 kg (132 lb). The race was cancelled twice during World War II, in 1939 and 1940. It was held at Maisons-Laffitte in 1943 and Le Tremblay in 1944.

The distance of the Prix du Pin remained at 3,000 metres until 1949. It was subsequently contested over 2,500 metres (1950–51), 1,850 metres (1952–55), 2,600 metres (1956) and 2,000 metres (1957–59). In the 1960s, it was run over 1,850 metres (1960–61), 2,100 metres (1962–63), 2,000 metres (1964) and 1,800 metres (1965–69). It was shortened to 1,400 metres in 1970.

For a period the Prix du Pin held Listed status. It was promoted to Group 3 level in 2004.

== Records ==
Most successful horse (2 wins):

- Mamiano – 1895, 1896
- Porthos – 1935, 1937
- Kaldoun – 1978, 1979

Leading jockey (5 wins):

- Christophe Soumillon – Sahpresa (2010), Taniyar (2015), Jallota (2016), City Light (2019), Sagamiyra (2021)

Leading trainer (7 wins):

- Criquette Head-Maarek – Made of Pearl (1986), Bitooh (1988), Malaspina (1989), Neverneyev (1994), Vert Val (1997), Midnight Foxtrot (1999), Etoile Montante (2003)

Leading owner (5 wins):

- Daniel Wildenstein – Perpetual (1969), Johannesburg (1974), Nurabad (1976), Poplar Bluff (1995), Alamo Bay (1998)
- Aga Khan IV – Kaldoun (1978, 1979), Zarannda (1996), Taniyar (2015), Sagamiyra (2021)

== Winners since 1978 ==
Year	Winner	Age	Jockey	Trainer	Owner	Time
1978	Kaldoun	3	Jacques Heloury	François Mathet	Aga Khan IV	1:23.10
1979	Kaldoun	4	Yves Saint-Martin	François Mathet	Aga Khan IV
1980	Princesse Lida	3	Freddy Head	Alec Head	Jacques Wertheimer
1981	Princely Ruler	3	Maurice Philipperon	John Cunnington, Jr.	Ralph Wilson
1982	Prospero	5	Claude Ramonet	C. Hervé	Mrs Sylvain Aknin
1983	Ice Hot	3	Gérard Dubroeucq	Claude Beniada	Richard Winn
1984	Nikos	3	Alain Badel	J. C. Cunnington	Countess Batthyany
1985	River Drummer	3	Alain Lequeux	François Boutin	Stavros Niarchos
1986	Made of Pearl	3	Gérald Mossé	Criquette Head	Ecurie Aland
1987	Allius	4	Yves Saint-Martin	Alain de Royer-Dupré	Etti Plesch
1988	Bitooh	3	Guy Guignard	Criquette Head	Maktoum Al Maktoum
1989	Malaspina	5	Guy Guignard	Criquette Head	Ghislaine Head
1990	Philippi	4	Gérald Mossé	Nicolas Clément	Jean-Louis Beuzelin
1991	Hello Pink	3	Alain Badel	Henri van de Poele	Leseleuc de Kerouara	1:24.00
1992	Kenbu	3	Freddy Head	François Boutin	Tomohiro Wada	1:23.50
1993	Sharp Prod	3	Lester Piggott	Lord Huntingdon	Elizabeth II	1:24.70
1994	Neverneyev	4	Olivier Doleuze	Criquette Head	Jacques Wertheimer	1:25.50
1995	Poplar Bluff	3	Olivier Peslier	André Fabre	Daniel Wildenstein	1:28.20
1996	Zarannda	3	Gérald Mossé	Alain de Royer-Dupré	Aga Khan IV	1:25.70
1997	Vert Val ^{[a]}	3	Olivier Doleuze	Criquette Head	Wertheimer et Frère	1:22.80
1998	Alamo Bay	5	Olivier Peslier	André Fabre	Daniel Wildenstein	1:24.40
1999	Midnight Foxtrot	3	Olivier Doleuze	Criquette Head	Maktoum Al Maktoum	1:22.70
2000	Touch of the Blues	3	Dominique Boeuf	Carlos Laffon-Parias	Maktoum Al Maktoum	1:21.80
2001	Amonita	3	Thierry Jarnet	Pascal Bary	Mrs Paul de Moussac	1:23.90
2002	Cayoke	5	Thierry Gillet	Sylvain Guillot	Patricia Beck	1:23.30
2003	Etoile Montante	3	Olivier Peslier	Criquette Head-Maarek	Khalid Abdullah	1:20.00
2004	Comete	5	Davy Bonilla	Maxime Cesandri	Mrs Jean-Claude Bouret	1:20.10
2005	Coupe de Champe	4	Stéphane Pasquier	Patrick Tual	Jacques Seror	1:19.90
2006	Price Tag	3	Thierry Thulliez	Pascal Bary	Khalid Abdullah	1:22.70
2007	Sabana Perdida	4	Christophe Lemaire	Alain de Royer-Dupré	Scuderia Zaro	1:19.80
2008	Captain's Lover	4	Stéphane Pasquier	André Fabre	Team Valor	1:20.30
2009	Proviso	4	Stéphane Pasquier	André Fabre	Khalid Abdullah	1:22.13
2010	Sahpresa	5	Christophe Soumillon	Rod Collet	Douglas McIntyre	1:19.67
2011	Best Dating	4	Gregory Benoist	Stéphane Wattel	Jean-Jacques Rabineau	1:24.02
2012	Blue Soave	4	Thierry Thulliez	Fabrice Chappet	Belluteau / Gustave	1:20.13
2013	Desert Blanc	5	Gregory Benoist	Christian Baillet	Ecurie Jarlan	1:20.31
2014	Bamiyan	4	Thierry Jarnet	Thierry Lemer	Henri de la Chauvelais	1:20.09
2015	Taniyar	3	Christophe Soumillon	Alain de Royer-Dupré	HH Aga Khan IV	1:19.63
2016	Jallota^{[b]}	5	Christophe Soumillon	Charlie Hills	Fitri Hay	1:24.16
2017	Karar^{[b]}	5	Gregory Benoist	Francis-Henri Graffard	Al Shaqab Racing	1:24.05
2018	Tornibush	4	Olivier Peslier	Philippe Decouz	Antoine Griezmann & Ecurie Seyssel	1:18.93
2019	City Light	5	Christophe Soumillon	Stephane Wattel	Ecurie Jean-Louis Bouchard	1:18.37
2020	Earthlight	3	Mickael Barzalona	André Fabre	Godolphin	1:18.42
2021	Sagamiyra	4	Christophe Soumillon	Mikel Delzangles	HH Aga Khan IV	1:20.40
2022	Fang	4	Cristian Demuro	Jean-Claude Rouget	Ecurie B Weill, Laurent Dassault Et Al.	1:21.30
2023	Fang	5	Cristian Demuro	Jean-Claude Rouget	Ecurie B Weill, Laurent Dassault Et Al.	1:19.66
2024	Topgear	5	Stephane Pasquier	Christopher Head	Hisaaki Saito	1:21.27

^{a} Keos finished first in 1997, but he was relegated to third place following a stewards' inquiry.
^{b} The 2016 & 2017 runnings took place at Chantilly while Longchamp was closed for redevelopment.

== Earlier winners ==
- 1883: Athala
- 1884: Louis d'Or
- 1885: Fra Diavolo
- 1886: Barberine
- 1887: Presta
- 1888: Bavarde
- 1889: Bocage
- 1890: Barberousse
- 1891: Le Glorieux
- 1892: Fitz Roya
- 1893: Avoir
- 1894: Boissiere
- 1895: Mamiano
- 1896: Mamiano
- 1897: Champaubert
- 1898: General Albert
- 1899: Cazabat
- 1900:
- 1901: Ivoire
- 1902: La Camargo
- 1903: Exema
- 1904: Hebron
- 1905: Presto
- 1906:
- 1907: Moulins la Marche
- 1908:
- 1909:
- 1910: Ronde de Nuit
- 1911: Cadet Roussel
- 1912:
- 1913: Afgar
- 1914:
- 1919: Marmouset
- 1920: Simpri
- 1921: As des As
- 1922: Bassan
- 1923:
- 1924: Quinze Mille
- 1925: Catalin
- 1926: Winner
- 1927: Wonderful
- 1928: Philemon
- 1929: Mondovi / Suzerain *
- 1930: Nil
- 1931: Burlington Arcade
- 1932: Rhone
- 1933: Barneveldt
- 1934: Gracchus
- 1935: Porthos
- 1936: Son in Love
- 1937: Porthos
- 1938: Vent du Nord
- 1939–40: no race
- 1941: Chambord
- 1942: Threw
- 1943: Kilbiri
- 1944: Garde a Vous
- 1945:
- 1946:
- 1947:
- 1948: Diable Gris
- 1949: Finaud
- 1950: Petite Main
- 1951: Templier
- 1952: Minoutchehr
- 1953:
- 1954: Damelot
- 1955: Hathor
- 1956: Valcares
- 1957: Chippendale
- 1958:
- 1959: Theodebert
- 1960:
- 1961:
- 1962: Esmar
- 1963:
- 1964: Aravios
- 1965: Le Fabuleux
- 1966:
- 1967: Adjar
- 1968: Iranovo
- 1969: Perpetual
- 1970: Moi Meme
- 1971:
- 1972:
- 1973:
- 1974: Johannesburg
- 1975: Northern Taste
- 1976: Nurabad
- 1977:

* The 1929 and 1945 races were dead-heats and have joint winners.

== See also ==
- List of French flat horse races
