= Marchand d'Or =

French-bred Thoroughbred racehorse

- Sire: Marchand de Sable
- Grandsire: Theatrical
- Dam: Fedora
- Damsire: Kendor
- Sex: Gelding
- Foaled: 2003
- Country: France
- Colour: Grey
- Breeder: Mme. Carla Giral
- Owner: Mme. Carla Giral
- Trainer: Freddy Head; Mikel Delzangles
- Record: 40: 12-2-4
- Earnings: €1.233.538

Major wins
- Prix de la Porte Maillot (2006, 2007); Prix Maurice de Gheest (2006, 2007, 2008); Prix du Gros Chêne (2008); July Cup (2008); Prix de l'Abbaye de Longchamp (2008); Prix de Saint-Georges (2010); Prix de Meautry (2011)

Awards
- European Champion Sprinter (2008)

Marchand d'Or (foaled February 21, 2003 in Calvados, France) is a Thoroughbred racehorse. In 2008, he won his third straight Prix Maurice de Gheest at Deauville Racecourse, thus becoming the first to ever win three consecutive runnings of any French Group 1 race.

In 2010, the horse switched trainer to Mikel Delzangles and had six starts during the season with the Group 3 Prix de Saint-Georges his only win. In the 2011 season Merchand d'Or also won one of his six starts, the Group 3 Prix de Meautry. So far during the 2012 campaign the horse has yet to finish better than third in three races.

In 2008, he became the first horse to win three consecutive editions of any French Group 1 race.
