= Davy Bonilla =

French jockey

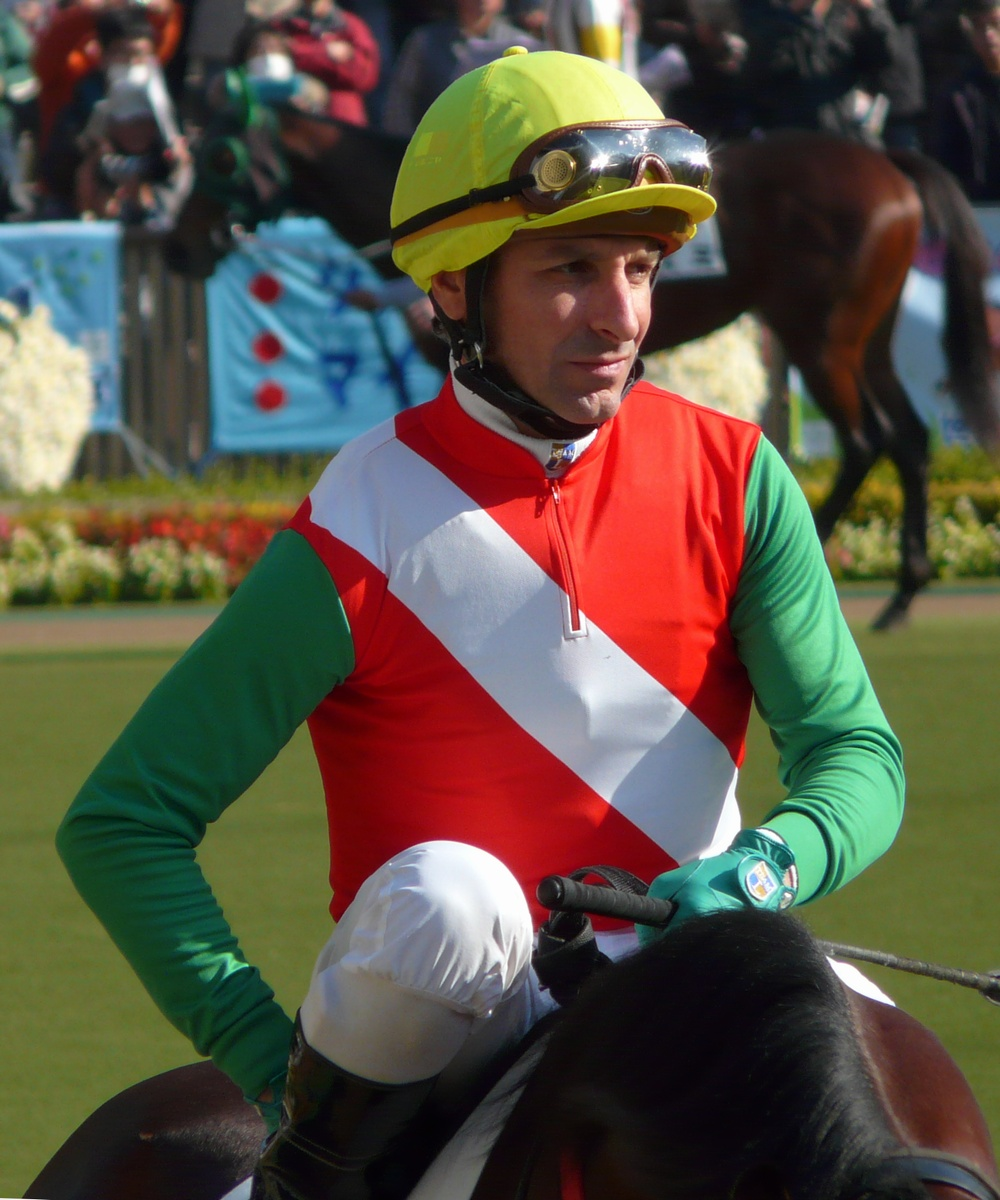
Davy-Bonilla20101128

Davy Bonilla (born 29 September 1973) is a horse racing jockey based in France.

== Major wins ==
France

- Prix de l'Abbaye de Longchamp - (1) - Marchand d'Or (2008)
- Prix du Cadran - (1) - San Sebastian (2000)
- Prix d'Ispahan - (1) - Laverock (2006)
- Prix Jacques Le Marois - (1) - Tamayuz (2008)
- Prix Jean-Luc Lagardère - (1) - Naaqoos (2008)
- Prix Jean Prat - (1) - Tamayuz (2008)
- Prix Maurice de Gheest - (3) - Marchand d'Or (2006, 2007, 2008)

Germany

- Deutsches Derby - (1) - Nicaron (2005)
- Preis von Europa - (1) - Golden Snake (2000)

(United Kingdom) Great Britain

- July Cup - (1) - Marchand d'Or (2008)

Italy

- Gran Premio del Jockey Club - (1) - Laverock (2006)
