= Prix Maurice de Gheest =

- Class: Group 1
- Location: Deauville Racecourse; Deauville, France
- Inaugurated: 1922
- Race type: Flat / Thoroughbred
- Sponsor: Larc
- Website: france-galop.com

Race information
- Distance: 1,300 metres (6½f)
- Surface: Turf
- Track: Straight
- Qualification: Three-years-old and up
- Weight: 56 kg (3yo); 58 kg (4yo+); Allowances; 1½ kg for fillies and mares
- Purse: €380,000 (2022); 1st: €217,132

Prix Maurice de Gheest
2026
| Samangan | Division | Stolen Kiss |

Previous years
2025
Sajir | Lazzat | Woodshauna
2024
Lazzat | Exxtra | Beauvatier
2023
King Gold | Spycatcher | Saint Lawrence
2021
Marianafoot | Tropbeau | Starman
2020
Space Blues | Hello Youmzain | Lope Y Fernandez
2019
Advertise | Brando | Space Blues
2018
Polydream | James Garfield | The Tin Man
2017
Brando | Aclaim | Tupi
2016
Signs Of Blessing | Donjuan Triumphant | Jimmy Two Times
2015
Muhaarar | Esoterique | Gordon Lord Byron
2014
Garswood | Thawaany | Fiesolana
2013
Moonlight Cloud | Lethal Force | Gordon Lord Byron
2012
Moonlight Cloud | Wizz Kid | The Cheka
2011
Moonlight Cloud | Society Rock | Marchand D'Or

2010-2001
2010
Regal Parade | Joanna | High Standing
2009
King's Apostle | Mariol | Lesson In Humility
2008
Marchand D'Or | African Rose | Belliflore
2007
Marchand D'Or | Dutch Art | Silver Touch
2006
Marchand D'Or | Satri | Amadeus Wolf
2005
Whipper | Goodricke | Patavellian
2004
Somnus | Whipper | Dolma
2003
Porlezza | Etoile Montante | Avonbridge
2002
May Ball | Air Thule | Nayyir
2001
King Charlemagne | Three Points | Kier Park

2000-1990
2000
Bold Edge | Lend A Hand | Gorse
1999
Diktat | Gold Away | Bertolini
1998
Seeking The Pearl | Jim And Tonic | Muchea
1997
Occupandiste | Monaassib | Titus Livius
1996
Anabaa | Miesque's Son | Danehill Dancer
1995
Cherokee Rose | Young Ern | Wessam Prince
1994
Dolphin Street | Catrail | Lavinia Fontana
1993
College Chapel | Danakal | Matelot
1992
Pursuit Of Love | Cardoun | Twafeaj
1991
Roman Prose | Masterclass | Exit To Nowhere
1990
Dead Certain | Rock City | Pole Position

The Prix Maurice de Gheest is a Group 1 flat horse race in France open to thoroughbreds aged three years or older. It is run at Deauville over a distance of 1,300 metres (about 6½ furlongs), and it is scheduled to take place each year in August.

== History ==
The event was established in 1922, and it was originally contested over 1,400 metres. It was named in memory of Maurice de Gheest (1850–1920), a member of the Société des Courses de Deauville, a former governing body at the venue.

Deauville Racecourse was closed during World War II, and the Prix Maurice de Gheest was cancelled in 1940. For the remainder of this period it was switched between Maisons-Laffitte (1941–43, 1945) and Auteuil (1944). It returned to Deauville in 1946, and it was cut to 1,300 metres in 1966.

The present system of race grading was introduced in 1971, and the Prix Maurice de Gheest was initially classed at Group 3 level. It was promoted to Group 2 status in 1980, and to the highest level, Group 1, in 1995.

The Prix Maurice de Gheest was included in the Turf Sprint division of the Breeders' Cup Challenge series in 2009, but it was removed from the series the following year.

The race was sponsored by Wertheimer et Frère in 2011, and its title featured the name of Goldikova, a successful mare owned and bred by the Wertheimers.

The race has been sponsored since 2013 by LARC, Latin American Racing Channel broadcasting South American races to Europe, United States, Australia and Turkey, since 2006.

== Records ==
Most successful horse (3 wins):

- Marchand d'Or – 2006, 2007, 2008
- Moonlight Cloud - 2011, 2012, 2013

Leading jockey (4 wins):

- Lester Piggott – Mountain Call (1968), Abergwaun (1972), Moorestyle (1981), College Chapel (1993)
- Gérald Mossé - Cricket Ball (1989), Dolphin Street (1994), May Ball (2002), Garswood (2014)

Leading trainer (7 wins):

- Freddy Head – Marchand d'Or (2006, 2007, 2008), Moonlight Cloud (2011, 2012, 2013), Polydream (2018)

Leading owner (4 wins):

- Marcel Boussac – Zariba (1922), Grillemont (1923), Theano (1943), Windorah (1947)
- Pierre Wertheimer – Sonny Boy (1933), Djanet (1956), Midget (1957), Tomahawk (1959)

== Winners since 1979 ==
| Year | Winner | Age | Jockey | Trainer | Owner | Time |
|---|---|---|---|---|---|---|
| 1974 | Lianga | 3 | Peter Cook | Daniel Wildenstein | Angel Penna, Sr. | 1:15.60 |
| 1975 | Sky Commander | 3 | Bill Pyers | Charles Milbank | E V Benjamin | 1:16.70 |
| 1976 | Girl Friend | 4 | Gérard Dubroeucq | Philippe Lallié | D W Molins | 1:23.2 |
| 1977 | Flying Water | 4 | Yves Saint-Martin | François Boutin | Angel Penna, Sr. | 1:17.3 |
| 1978 | King of Macedon | 4 | Maurice Philipperon | John Cunnington | Michael Sobell | 1:21.4 |
| 1979 | Boitron | 3 | Philippe Paquet | François Boutin | Stavros Niarchos | 1:19.7 |
| 1980 | Boitron | 4 | Philippe Paquet | François Boutin | Stavros Niarchos | 1:20.2 |
| 1981 | Moorestyle | 4 | Lester Piggott | Robert Armstrong | Moores Furnishings Ltd | 1:15.2 |
| 1982 | Exclusive Order | 3 | Maurice Philipperon | John Cunnington, Jr. | Paul de Moussac |
| 1983 | Beaudelaire | 3 | Pat Eddery | Vincent O'Brien | Robert Sangster | 1:16.3 |
| 1984 | Never So Bold | 4 | Steve Cauthen | Robert Armstrong | Edward Kessly | 1:16.5 |
| 1985 | Spectacular Joke | 3 | Maurice Philipperon | John Cunnington, Jr. | Paul de Moussac | 1:16.6 |
| 1986 | Lead on Time | 3 | Pat Eddery | Olivier Douieb | Maktoum Al Maktoum | 1:17.4 |
| 1987 | Interval | 3 | Pat Eddery | Jeremy Tree | Khalid Abdullah | 1:16.9 |
| 1988 | Blue Note | 3 | Gary W. Moore | Criquette Head | Ghislaine Head | 1:17.8 |
| 1989 | Cricket Ball | 6 | Gérald Mossé | John Fellows | Robin Scully | 1:20.2 |
| 1990 | Dead Certain | 3 | Cash Asmussen | David Elsworth | Toby Marten | 1:19.6 |
| 1991 | Roman Prose | 6 | Marc de Smyter | Jonathan Pease | Henry Seymour | 1:16.3 |
| 1992 | Pursuit of Love | 3 | Michael Kinane | Henry Cecil | Lord Howard de Walden | 1:16.3 |
| 1993 | College Chapel | 3 | Lester Piggott | Vincent O'Brien | Red Nab Racing Ltd | 1:18.3 |
| 1994 | Dolphin Street | 4 | Gérald Mossé | John Hammond | Stavros Niarchos | 1:18.7 |
| 1995 | Cherokee Rose | 4 | Cash Asmussen | John Hammond | Sheikh Mohammed | 1:16.5 |
| 1996 | Anabaa | 4 | Freddy Head | Criquette Head | Ghislaine Head | 1:19.0 |
| 1997 | Occupandiste | 4 | Olivier Doleuze | Criquette Head | Wertheimer et Frère | 1:16.7 |
| 1998 | Seeking the Pearl | 4 | Yutaka Take | Hideyuki Mori | Tomoko Uenaka | 1:14.7 |
| 1999 | Diktat | 4 | Frankie Dettori | Saeed bin Suroor | Godolphin | 1:18.2 |
| 2000 | Bold Edge | 5 | Dane O'Neill | Richard Hannon Sr. | Lady Whent & Friends | 1:16.0 |
| 2001 | King Charlemagne | 3 | Jamie Spencer | Aidan O'Brien | Tabor / Magnier | 1:19.3 |
| 2002 | May Ball | 5 | Gérald Mossé | John Gosden | Lord Hartington | 1:17.7 |
| 2003 | Porlezza | 4 | Christophe Soumillon | Yves de Nicolay | Erika Hilger | 1:17.9 |
| 2004 | Somnus | 4 | Gary Stevens | Tim Easterby | Legard / Sidebottom / Sykes | 1:16.0 |
| 2005 | Whipper | 4 | Christophe Soumillon | Robert Collet | Richard C. Strauss | 1:17.1 |
| 2006 | Marchand d'Or | 3 | Davy Bonilla | Freddy Head | Carla Giral | 1:15.9 |
| 2007 | Marchand d'Or | 4 | Davy Bonilla | Freddy Head | Carla Giral | 1:14.9 |
| 2008 | Marchand d'Or | 5 | Davy Bonilla | Freddy Head | Carla Giral | 1:18.4 |
| 2009 | King's Apostle | 5 | Ryan Moore | William Haggas | Bernard Kantor | 1:15.7 |
| 2010 | Regal Parade | 6 | Adrian Nicholls | David Nicholls | Dab Hand Racing | 1:16.8 |
| 2011 | Moonlight Cloud | 3 | Thierry Jarnet | Freddy Head | George Strawbridge | 1:16.4 |
| 2012 | Moonlight Cloud | 4 | Thierry Jarnet | Freddy Head | George Strawbridge | 1:15.5 |
| 2013 | Moonlight Cloud | 5 | Thierry Jarnet | Freddy Head | George Strawbridge | 1:14.3 |
| 2014 | Garswood | 4 | Gérald Mossé | Richard Fahey | David Armstrong & Cheveley Park Stud | 1:19.71 |
| 2015 | Muhaarar | 3 | Paul Hanagan | Charlie Hills | Hamdan Al Maktoum | 1:15.33 |
| 2016 | Signs of Blessing | 5 | Stéphane Pasquier | Francois Rohaut | Isabelle Corbani | 1:16.74 |
| 2017 | Brando | 5 | Tom Eaves | Kevin Ryan | Angie Bailey | 1:15.61 |
| 2018 | Polydream | 3 | Maxime Guyon | Freddy Head | Wertheimer et Frère | 1:16.00 |
| 2019 | Advertise | 3 | Frankie Dettori | Martyn Meade | Phoenix Thoroughbreds | 1:15.35 |
| 2020 | Space Blues | 4 | William Buick | Charlie Appleby | Godolphin | 1:15.76 |
| 2021 | Marianafoot | 6 | Mickael Barzalona | Jerome Reynier | Jean-Claude Seroul | 1:17.04 |
| 2022 | Highfield Princess | 5 | Jason Hart | John Quinn | Trainers House Enterprises Ltd | 1:15.30 |
| 2023 | King Gold | 6 | Stéphane Pasquier | Nicolas Caullery | Mme Christian Wingtans & Nicolas Caullery | 1:19.71 |
| 2024 | Lazzat | 3 | Antonio Orani | Jerome Reynier | Nurlan Bizakov | 1:15.82 |
| 2025 | Sajir | 4 | Oisin Murphy | André Fabre | Prince A.A. Faisal | 1:15.09 |
| 2026 | Samangan | 3 | Mickael Barzalona | Francis-Henri Graffard | Aga Khan Studs SC | 1:16.40 |

== Earlier winners ==
- 1922: Zariba
- 1923: Grillemont
- 1924: Persephone
- 1925: Lezignan
- 1926: Nyo
- 1927: Mordicus
- 1928: Galopin
- 1929: Tivoli
- 1930: Advertencia
- 1931: Masked Jester
- 1932: Ziani
- 1933: Sonny Boy
- 1934: Jocrisse
- 1935: Master Vere
- 1936: Aziyade
- 1937: Aziyade
- 1938: Sweet Dream
- 1939: Le Koh-i-Noor
- 1940: no race
- 1941: Becassin
- 1942: Galene
- 1943: Theano
- 1944: Le Volcan
- 1945:
- 1946: Tango
- 1947: Windorah
- 1948: Drakkar
- 1949: Djebe
- 1950: Skylarking
- 1951:
- 1952: Guam
- 1953: Vamarie
- 1954: Vamarie
- 1955:
- 1956: Djanet
- 1957: Midget
- 1958: Val d'Oisans
- 1959: Tomahawk
- 1960: Rina
- 1961: Nice Guy
- 1962: Nice Guy
- 1963: Tryptic
- 1964: Spy Well
- 1965: Yours
- 1966: Han d'Island
- 1967: Radames
- 1968: Mountain Call
- 1969: Quebracho
- 1970: Irish Minstrel
- 1971: Sweet Revenge
- 1972: Abergwaun
- 1973: Pepenador

== See also ==
- List of French flat horse races
