= John Hammond (racehorse trainer) =

British-French Thoroughbred horse trainer (born 1960)

John E. Hammond (born 27 June 1960) is a retired Thoroughbred horse trainer based in Chantilly, Oise, France.

Throughout his training career, which began in 1987, Hammond trained numerous Group One winners, including Montjeu and Suave Dancer, both of whom won the Prix de l'Arc de Triomphe, France's most prestigious horse race. Hammond's horses also won important races in Ireland, Great Britain, and the United States.

Hammond also trained useful European and latterly American-based sprinter, Nuclear Debate. Hammond retired from training at the end of the 2019 season.

== Major wins ==
France

- Grand Prix de Saint-Cloud - (1) - Montjeu (2000)
- Prix de l'Abbaye de Longchamp - (1) - Imperial Beauty (2001)
- Prix de l'Arc de Triomphe - (2) - Suave Dancer (1991), Montjeu (1999)
- Prix du Cadran - (1) - Sought Out (1992)
- Prix de la Forêt - (1) - Dolphin Street (1993)
- Prix Ganay - (1) - Execute (2004)
- Prix du Jockey Club - (2) - Suave Dancer (1991), Montjeu (1999)
- Prix Maurice de Gheest - (2) - Dolphin Street (1994), Cherokee Rose (1995)
- Prix de l'Opéra - (1) - Insight (1998)
- Prix Vermeille - (1) - Sweet Stream (2004)

Canada

- Canadian International - (1) - Sarah Lynx (2011)
- E. P. Taylor Stakes - (1) - Insight (1999)

(United Kingdom) Great Britain

- Haydock Sprint Cup - (3) - Polar Falcon (1991), Cherokee Rose (1995), Nuclear Debate (2001)
- King George VI and Queen Elizabeth Stakes - (1) - Montjeu (2000)
- King's Stand Stakes - (1) - Nuclear Debate (2000)
- Lockinge Stakes - (1) - Polar Falcon (1991)
- Nunthorpe Stakes - (1) - Nuclear Debate (2000)

Hong Kong

- Hong Kong Vase - (1) - Red Bishop (1994)

(Republic of Ireland) Ireland

- Irish Champion Stakes - (1) - Suave Dancer (1991)
- Irish Derby - (1) - Montjeu (1999)
- Tattersalls Gold Cup - (1) - Montjeu (2000)

United States

- Arlington Million - (1) - Dear Doctor (1992)
- Laurel Futurity - (1) - River Traffic (1990)
