= State Of Rest =

Irish-bred Thoroughbred racehorse

- Racing silks of Long Wait Two Partnership, Teme Valley Racing and State of Rest Partnership
- Sire: Starspangledbanner
- Grandsire: Choisir
- Dam: Repose
- Damsire: Quiet American
- Sex: Colt
- Foaled: 11 April 2018
- Country: Ireland
- Colour: bay
- Breeder: Tinnakill Bloodstock
- Owner: 1. Long Wait Two Partnership; 2. Teme Valley Racing; 3. State Of Rest Partnership
- Trainer: Joseph Patrick O'Brien
- Record: 12: 5-1-3
- Earnings: £2,920,966

Major wins
- Saratoga Derby (2021); W. S. Cox Plate (2021); Prix Ganay (2022); Prince of Wales's Stakes (2022)
- Last updated on 16 June 2022

State Of Rest (foaled 11 April 2018) is a retired Irish-bred and trained Thoroughbred racehorse. He was one of leading three-year-olds of 2021 winning Australia's premier G1 W. S. Cox Plate and Grade I Saratoga Derby Invitational Stakes in the United States. In 2022 he added further Group 1 wins, taking the Prix Ganay in France and the Prince of Wales's Stakes in England.

== Background ==
State Of Rest is a bay colt, out of the Quiet American unraced mare Repose, was bred in Ireland by Tinnakill Bloodstock. He was sired by Starpangledbanner who was a champion sprinter in Australia before relocating to Europe where he won the Golden Jubilee Stakes and July Cup in 2010 and took the Cartier Champion Sprinter award. As a breeding stallion he had fertility problems, but sired other good horses including The Wow Signal, Millisle, Home of the Brave (John of Gaunt Stakes) and Anthem Alexander (Queen Mary Stakes).

In 2018 the colt was initially bought for 45,000 guineas by Diamond Bloodstock from Tinnakill House's consignment at the Tattersalls December Foal Sale. In 2019 Joseph O'Brien and Aidan O'Ryan purchased him for 60,000 guineas from Whatton Manor Stud's consignment to the Tattersalls October Yearling Sale.

Currently he is owned by Teme Valley.

== Racing career ==
=== 2020: two-year-old season ===
State Of Rest began his career with a win on 15 June 2020 in a Maiden event at Fairyhouse Racecourse over six furlongs running against 13 other runners, starting at 6/1 and defeating the favourite Giorgio Vasari by 1/2 length in a time of 1:13.75. The victory would be the only win during his juvenile season.

In his five other starts during the season his best effort was a second as the 7/4 favourite at his next start at Leopardstown. State Of Rest ran in three group events finishing third in the Group 2 Champagne Stakes at Doncaster and was fifth in the Group 1 Vertem Futurity Trophy in his last race of the year.

=== 2021: three-year-old season ===
After a spell of eight months, State Of Rest first competitive race was at The Curragh on 26 June 2021 finished third at odds of 13/2 in the Listed Celebration Stakes over one mile finishing well to be beaten only about a 1/2 length on a good to firm track.

State Of Rest was sent to the United States and in his next start to run in the second leg of the rich NYRA Turf Trinity, the Grade I US$1 million Saratoga Derby Invitational Stakes over the 1 3/16 miles distance at Saratoga Race Course held 7 August 2021. Starting at the odds of 21/1 State of Rest was shuffled back to mid-pace, but US Hall of Fame jockey John Velazquez got him settled and saved ground down the backstretch. Entering the stretch with the leaders starting to tire out, Velazquez positioned State of Rest out toward the center of the track. After racing together briefly with Soldier Rising who was making a quick move up the rail, State of Rest managed to push clear, winning on the firm turf in 1:53.35 by one length. Trainer O'Brien was pleased commenting, "It's a pleasure to be here (in the US) and to have a horse that runs well here".

In September, State Of Rest was airlifted to Australia and was entered in the country's premier Weight for Age, the AU$5,000,000 Group I MVRC Ladbrokes Cox Plate. State Of Rest prepared for the event while on quarantine at Werribee Racetrack at Werribee. Prior to the start of the event, one of the favourites, Zaaki (GB) was scratched. The event was held 23 October 2021. In the running of the event jockey John Allen positioned State Of Rest unhurriedly near the rear of the field early. While approaching the straight Allen managed to guide State Of Rest near the rails and in the straight was able to hold off Caulfield Guineas winner Anamoe at the finishing line by a short head. However, the decision was not clear as Anamoe's jockey Craig Williams lodged a protest for interference in the straight. The protest was dismissed after a lengthy review by the stewards. The trainer Joseph O'Brien follows in his father's footsteps after his training victory in this event in 2014 with Adelaide (IRE). The trainer praised the owners, the manager Richard Ryan and Jim Coburn and also Mark Power and MJ Doran who travelled with horse and looked after State Of Rest for several weeks in preparation for the event. State Of Rest was to be nominated for the Group I VRC LKS MacKinnon Stakes but trainer Joseph O'Brien withdrew the horse opting to send him back to Ireland and the paddock for a spell.

=== 2022: four-year-old season ===
State Of Rest began his third campaign with a trip to France to contest the Group 1 Prix Ganay over 2100 metres at Longchamp Racecourse on 1 May when he was ridden by Shane Crosse and went off the fourth choice in the betting behind Skalleti, Sealiway and Mare Australis. He raced fourth of the six runners before making steady progress in the straight, taking the lead 200 metres from the finish and winning by three quarters of a length from the outsider Pretty Tiger. O'Brien commented "The race didn’t set up perfectly for him and he managed it very well... He has a very good constitution, it’s not every horse you could campaign the way this lad has been campaigned. I think it’s a testament to the horse’s mind, his versatility and his constitution to travel as much as he has and keep performing.”

Three weeks after his win in France, State Of Rest started 2/1 joint favourite for the Tattersalls Gold Cup at the Curragh. He raced in mid division before finishing strongly to take third place behind Alenquer and High Definition beaten a neck and the same by the first two. The Racing Post commented that Crosse had given the colt "too much to do".

The Group 1 Prince of Wales's Stakes over ten furlongs on good to firm ground on 15 June attracted a small but select field with the five contenders being State Of Rest, Bay Bridge, Shahryar, Lord North and Grand Glory. Starting the 5/1 third choice in the betting, State Of Rest took the lead from the start and set a steady pace before accelerating approaching the last quarter mile and kept on well in the closing stages to win by a length from Bay Bridge. After the race Joseph O'Brien said “He’s a very tough horse and he’s a very hard horse to go past. We knew he’d be fighting hard at the line. Shane executed it perfectly... I was quite relaxed watching the race because it was going how I hoped it would. It’s not very often that happens in racing. I think it was probably a career best but he had been training very well."

On 14 August connections of State Of Rest entered him in the Group 1 Prix du Haras de Fresnay-le-Buffard Jacques le Marois at Deauville over the 1600-metre distance. Starting at odds slightly over 13/2 State Of Rest was up close in the early stages of the event but with 600 meters to run he had dropped out to the tail of the field.

In late August 2022, State Of Rest was retired from racing after an MRI scan conducted by Racing Victoria found an issue. State Of Rest was being aimed to return to Australia to defend his Cox Plate crown at the Moonee Valley in October.

== Statistics ==
Date	Distance	Race	Group Grade	Track	Odds	Field	Finish	Time	Winning (Losing) Margin	Jockey	Ref
2020 – Two-year-old season
15 Jun 2020	6 furlongs	Maiden		Fairyhouse	6/1	14	1	1:13.75	1/2 length	Declan McDonogh	
16 Jul 2020	7 furlongs	Auction		Leopardstown	7/4*	8	2	1:30.11	(1 length)	Declan McDonogh	
6 Aug 2020	7 furlongs	Tyros Stakes	III	Leopardstown	6/1	10	5	1:28.07	(1 1/2 lengths)	Declan McDonogh	
23 Aug 2020	6 furlongs	Irish EBF Ballyhane Stakes		Naas	8/1	19	4	1:13.95	(3 lengths)	Declan McDonogh	
12 Sep 2020	7 furlongs 6 yards	Champagne Stakes	II	Doncaster	13/2	7	3	1:24.21	(1 1/4 lengths)	Tom Marquand	
24 Oct 2020	1 mile	Vertem Futurity Trophy	I	Doncaster	11/2	8	5	1:41.98	(4 3/4 lengths)	Tom Marquand	
2021 – Three-year-old season
26 Jun 2021	1 mile	Celebration Stakes	Listed	The Curragh	13/2	11	3	1:41.18	(1/2 length)	Shane Crosse	
7 Aug 2021	1 3/16 miles	Saratoga Derby	I	Saratoga	21.10	11	1	1:53.35	1 length	John Velazquez	
23 Oct 2021	2040 metres	W. S. Cox Plate	I	Moonee Valley	7.30	11	1	2:06.97	short head	John Allen	
2022 – Four-year-old season
1 May 2022	2100 metres	Prix Ganay	I	Longchamp	11/2	6	1	2:08.46	3/4 length	Shane Crosse	
22 May 2022	1 5/16 miles	Tattersalls Gold Cup	I	The Curragh	2/1	8	3	2:11.44	(1/2 length)	Shane Crosse	
15 Jun 2022	1m 1f 212y	Prince of Wales's Stakes	I	Royal Ascot	5/1	5	1	2:07.79	1 length	Shane Crosse	
14 Aug 2022	1600 metres	Prix Jacques Le Marois	I	Deauville	6/1	9	8	1:34.07	(9 1/2 lengths)	Shane Crosse	

Legend:
Turf
Notes:
An (*) asterisk after the odds means State Of Rest was the post-time favourite.

== Pedigree ==
Pedigree of State Of Rest (IRE), bay colt, 2018
Sire Starspangledbanner (AUS) 2006	Choisir (AUS); 1999	Danehill Dancer (IRE); 1993	Danehill (USA)
Sire Starspangledbanner (AUS) 2006	Choisir (AUS); 1999	Danehill Dancer (IRE); 1993	Mira Adonde (USA)
Sire Starspangledbanner (AUS) 2006	Choisir (AUS); 1999	Great Selection (AUS); 1990	Lunchtime (GB)
Sire Starspangledbanner (AUS) 2006	Choisir (AUS); 1999	Great Selection (AUS); 1990	Pensive Mood (AUS)
Sire Starspangledbanner (AUS) 2006	Gold Anthem (AUS); 1999	Made Of Gold (USA); 1989	Green Forest (USA)
Sire Starspangledbanner (AUS) 2006	Gold Anthem (AUS); 1999	Made Of Gold (USA); 1989	Vindaria (USA)
Sire Starspangledbanner (AUS) 2006	Gold Anthem (AUS); 1999	National Song (AUS); 1992	Vain (AUS)
Sire Starspangledbanner (AUS) 2006	Gold Anthem (AUS); 1999	National Song (AUS); 1992	Olympic Aim (NZ)
Dam Repose (USA) 2012	Quiet American (USA); 1986	Fappiano (USA); 1977	Mr. Prospector (USA)
Dam Repose (USA) 2012	Quiet American (USA); 1986	Fappiano (USA); 1977	Killaloe (USA)
Dam Repose (USA) 2012	Quiet American (USA); 1986	Demure (USA); 1977	Dr. Fager (USA)
Dam Repose (USA) 2012	Quiet American (USA); 1986	Demure (USA); 1977	Quiet Charm (USA)
Dam Repose (USA) 2012	Monaassabaat (USA); 1991	Zilzal (USA); 1986	Nureyev (USA)
Dam Repose (USA) 2012	Monaassabaat (USA); 1991	Zilzal (USA); 1986	French Charmer (USA)
Dam Repose (USA) 2012	Monaassabaat (USA); 1991	It's In The Air (USA); 1976	Mr. Prospector (USA)
Dam Repose (USA) 2012	Monaassabaat (USA); 1991	It's In The Air (USA); 1976	A Wind Is Rising (USA) (Family: 4-k)
