= Rivet (horse) =

Irish-bred Thoroughbred racehorse

- Racing silks of The Starship Partnership while raced at Great Britain and Europe
- Sire: Fastnet Rock
- Grandsire: Danehill
- Dam: Starship
- Damsire: Galileo
- Sex: Colt
- Foaled: 3 April 2014
- Country: Ireland
- Colour: Bay
- Breeder: Des Scott
- Owner: Somerville Lodge Ltd; The Starship Partnership; Peter Law Kin Sang
- Trainer: William Haggas; John Moore; Caspar Fownes
- Record: 31: 3-4-2
- Earnings: £487,260

Major wins
- Champagne Stakes (2016); Racing Post Trophy (2016)

Rivet (AKA Rivet Delight, foaled 3 April 2014, Chinese: 喜裝寶) is an Irish-bred, British-trained Thoroughbred racehorse. He was one of the leading European two-year-old colts of 2016 when he won three of his five races including the Champagne Stakes and the Racing Post Trophy. He failed to train on and was exported to Hong Kong where he had little success.

== Background ==
Rivet is a bay colt with a small white star and three white socks bred in Ireland by Des Scott. During his racing career he has been owned by The Starship Partnership whose members include Lester Piggott. He was sent into training with Piggott's son-in-law William Haggas at his Somerville Lodge Stable at Newmarket, Suffolk.

His sire, the Australian stallion Fastnet Rock, was a sprinter whose victories included the Lightning Stakes and the Oakleigh Plate. He sired many leading horses including Shoals and Atlantic Jewel in the Southern hemisphere before moving to the Coolmore Stud in Ireland. His European progeny have included Fascinating Rock and Qualify. Rivet's dam Starship showed good racing ability, winning three of her seven races including a handicap race over one mile at Newmarket Racecourse in 2006. As a broodmare she has also produced the Gallinule Stakes winner Alexander Pope. She was a granddaughter of Dancing Rocks who was also the female-line ancestor of Footstepsinthesand and Power.

== Racing career ==
=== 2016: two-year-old season ===
Rivet made his racecourse debut in the Crocker Bulteel Maiden Stakes over six furlongs at Ascot Racecourse on 22 July in which he started 100/30 second favourite in a six-runner field. Ridden by Ryan Moore he started slowly but stayed on well in the last quarter mile to take second place, one and three quarter lengths behind the favourite Eqtiraan. On 19 August he was partnered by Frankie Dettori when he started the 15/8 favourite against twelve opponents for the Convivial Maiden Stakes over seven furlongs at York Racecourse. He took the lead approaching the final furlong despite veering sharply to the left and stayed on well to win by three and a quarter lengths from the outsider Contrapposto.

Andrea Atzeni took the ride when Rivet was stepped up in class and started 5/4 favourite for the Group Two Champagne Stakes over seven furlongs at Doncaster Racecourse on 10 September. The best fancied of his five opponents were Thunder Snow (second in the Vintage Stakes) and the maiden winners Majeste and D'bai. After racing in third place in the early stages he produced a sustained run in the last quarter mile, overtook Thunder Snow 75 yards from the finish and won by a head. After the race Haggas commented "He only just won but he won. He looks like he wants a bit further to me. He was a bit laboured and took a long time to get past but it's only his third run. This is a big horse and he can only get better in time."

On 8 October Rivet started at odds of 11/1 in a seven-runner field for the Dewhurst Stakes, Britain's most prestigious race for two-year-olds. After racing towards the rear of the field he made some progress in the last quarter mile without ever looking likely to win and finished fifth behind Churchill, Lancaster Bomber, Blue Point and Thunder Snow. Maureen Haggas later commented "Some horses don’t handle Newmarket and it just all went pear-shaped, I don’t know why. He was never really settled from the word go".

On his final run of the year, Rivet was moved up in distance for the Group One Racing Post Trophy over one mile at Doncaster on 22 October and started the 11/4 second favourite behind the Aidan O'Brien-trained Yucatán (runner-up in the Beresford Stakes). The other eight runners included Sir Dancealot (Rockingham Stakes), The Anvil (runner-up in the Royal Lodge Stakes), Salouen (runner-up in the Prix Jean-Luc Lagardère) and Contrapposto. Atzeni sent Rivet into the lead from the start and set a steady pace before accelerating two furlongs from the finish. He stayed on well in the closing stages and won by one and three quarter lengths from Yucatán with Salouen and Raheen House close behind in third and fourth. Atzeni, who was winning the race for the fourth time said I just let him stride on and enjoy it – it would have taken a good one to get by him. He's very genuine and he stays well. He's a lovely, big horse. He'll definitely go on".

In the official European Classification of two-year-olds for 2016, Rivet was given a rating of 115, making him the eighth best juvenile colt of the season, seven pounds behind the top-rated Churchill.

=== 2017: three-year-old season ===
Rivet began his second season in the Craven Stakes (a trial race for the 2000 Guineas) over one mile at Newmarket on 20 April. He led for most of the way but was overtaken in the final furlong and beaten into second by Eminent. The colt was then sent to France for the Poule d'Essai des Poulains which was run that year at Deauville Racecourse as Longchamp was closed for redevelopment. Ridden by Dettori he disputed the lead from the start before being outpaced in the closing stages and finished third behind the French-trained colts Brametot and Le Brivido. He was back in France on 4 June for the Prix du Jockey Club over 2100 metres at Chantilly Racecourse but finished unplaced behind Brametot. In the St James's Palace Stakes at Royal Ascot sixteen days later he started a 16/1 outsider and finished sixth of the eight runners behind Barney Roy.

=== Later career ===
After his defeat at Ascot in June 2017 Rivet was sold to Peter Law Kin Sang, gelded and exported to Hong Kong. Although he was conditioned by the leading trainers John Moore and Caspar Fownes, his record in Hong Kong was disappointing. He earned some good place money but failed to win in 18 races, making his last track appearance in Hong Kong on 3 July 2019. After being renamed Rivet Delight, he was sent to race in Australia where he failed to win in four starts.

== Pedigree ==
Pedigree of Rivet (IRE), bay colt, 2014
| Sire Fastnet Rock (AUS) 2001 | Danehill (USA); 1986 | Danzig | Northern Dancer (CAN) |
| Sire Fastnet Rock (AUS) 2001 | Danehill (USA); 1986 | Danzig | Pas de Nom |
| Sire Fastnet Rock (AUS) 2001 | Danehill (USA); 1986 | Razyana | His Majesty |
| Sire Fastnet Rock (AUS) 2001 | Danehill (USA); 1986 | Razyana | Spring Adieu (CAN) |
| Sire Fastnet Rock (AUS) 2001 | Piccadilly Circus (AUS); 1995 | Royal Academy (USA) | Nijinsky (CAN) |
| Sire Fastnet Rock (AUS) 2001 | Piccadilly Circus (AUS); 1995 | Royal Academy (USA) | Crimson Saint |
| Sire Fastnet Rock (AUS) 2001 | Piccadilly Circus (AUS); 1995 | Gatana | Marauding (NZ) |
| Sire Fastnet Rock (AUS) 2001 | Piccadilly Circus (AUS); 1995 | Gatana | Twigalae |
| Dam Starship (IRE) 2003 | Galileo (IRE); 1998 | Sadler's Wells (USA) | Northern Dancer (CAN) |
| Dam Starship (IRE) 2003 | Galileo (IRE); 1998 | Sadler's Wells (USA) | Fairy Bridge |
| Dam Starship (IRE) 2003 | Galileo (IRE); 1998 | Urban Sea (USA) | Miswaki |
| Dam Starship (IRE) 2003 | Galileo (IRE); 1998 | Urban Sea (USA) | Allegretta (GB) |
| Dam Starship (IRE) 2003 | Council Rock (GB); 1985 | General Assembly (USA) | Secretariat |
| Dam Starship (IRE) 2003 | Council Rock (GB); 1985 | General Assembly (USA) | Eclusive Dancer |
| Dam Starship (IRE) 2003 | Council Rock (GB); 1985 | Dancing Rocks | Green Dancer (USA) |
| Dam Starship (IRE) 2003 | Council Rock (GB); 1985 | Dancing Rocks | Croda Rossa (ITY) (Family 1-e) |

- Rivet was inbred 4 * 4 to Northern Dancer, meaning that this stallion appears twice in the fourth generation of his pedigree.
