= Merchant Navy (horse) =

Australian Thoroughbred racehorse

- Sire: Fastnet Rock
- Grandsire: Danehill
- Dam: Legally Bay
- Damsire: Snippets
- Sex: Stallion
- Foaled: 14 November 2014
- Country: Australia
- Colour: Bay
- Breeder: Chris Barham
- Owner: Seymour Bloodstock, Halo Racing Services et al Merchant Navy Syndicate; Tabor, Smith , Magnier
- Trainer: Ciaron Maher; Aaron Purcell; Aidan O'Brien
- Record: 10: 7-0-2
- Earnings: £951,009

Major wins
- ANZAC Day Stakes (2017); HDF McNeil Stakes (2017); Coolmore Stud Stakes (2017); Greenlands Stakes (2018); Diamond Jubilee Stakes (2018)

Merchant Navy (foaled 14 November 2014) is an Australian-bred Thoroughbred racehorse and sire. He showed considerable promise as a juvenile when he was undefeated in three start including the Listed ANZAC Day Stakes. As a three-year-old he proved himself one of the best horses of his generation in Australia over sprint distances, taking the HDF McNeil Stakes and the Coolmore Stud Stakes as well as being placed in both the Rubiton Stakes and the Newmarket Handicap. In the summer of 2018 he was relocated to Europe where he won both his races, the Greenlands Stakes in Ireland and the Diamond Jubilee Stakes at Royal Ascot.

== Background ==
Merchant Navy is a bay horse foaled at the Segenhoe Stud in New South Wales by Chris Barham, a chiropractor from Toowoomba. As a yearling he was consigned to the Inglis 2016 Easter Yearling Sale and was bought for A$350,000 by the trainer Ciaron Maher. The colt entered the ownership of a group headed by Seymour Bloodstock and was taken into training by Maher. He was ridden in most of his Australian races by Mark Zahra.

His sire, the Australian stallion Fastnet Rock, was a sprinter whose victories included the Lightning Stakes and the Oakleigh Plate. He sired many leading horses including Shoals and Atlantic Jewel in the Southern hemisphere before moving to the Coolmore Stud in Ireland. His European progeny have included Fascinating Rock and Qualify. Merchant Navy's dam, Legally Bay, showed good racing ability, winning the Group 3 Sweet Embrace Stakes in 2003. She was descended from Pirouette, a half-sister to the AJC Derby winner Innocent King.

== Racing career ==
=== 2016/17: two-year-old season ===
Merchant Navy began his racing career in a maiden race over 1200 metres at Pakenham Park on 2 March in which he started at odds of 5/2 and won by one and three quarter lengths. A month later at Sandown Racecourse the colt started odds on favourite for a handicap race over 1400 metres and won again, beating the Godolphin runner Platinum by a length. Luke Nolen took the ride when the colt was stepped up in class for the ANZAC Day Stakes at Flemington Racecourse on 25 April. Carrying top weight of 57.5 kg he completed an unbeaten first season as he came home a length in front of the favourite Casino Fourteen.

=== 2017/18: three-year-old season ===
On his three-year-old debut Merchant Navy started 5/2 favourite for the Group 3 HDF McNeil Stakes over 1200 metres at Caulfield Racecourse on 2 September. He came from the rear of the field to take the lead in the closing stages to win by a head from Booker. After the race Maher said "He’s a very exciting colt... He put the writing on the wall with his trials and the way he’s furnished during his spell and he’s now a well-rounded racehorse". Three weeks later he was strongly fancied for the Group 1 Golden Rose Stakes at Rosehill Racecourse but never looked likely to win and came home tenth of the fourteen runners behind Trapeze Artist. Two days after the race Ciaron Maher received a six-month suspension after it was revealed that several of his trainees were owned by the "convicted conman" Peter Foster, and his training duties were given over to Aaron Purcell.

On his first start for his new trainer Merchant Navy, wearing blinkers for the first time, was made an 18/1 outsider for the Coolmore Stud Stakes, a Group 1 race for three-year-olds over 1200 metres at Flemington on 4 November. The more fancied runners included Trapeze Artist, Invincible Star (Thoroughbred Club Stakes), Catchy (Blue Diamond Stakes), Viridine (Roman Consul Stakes), Houtzen (Scarborough Stakes) and Kementari. After racing towards the rear of the 20-runner field Merchant Navy was switched to the inside, produced a strong late run and won by a head and a short head from Invincible Star and Formality. Zahra commented "I always felt he was going to be in the finish, I just need to find him some clear air. I could see a lot of room back to the inside and went there and he started to picked up. Once I got past the Godolphin horse (Viridine) and back to the inside of the leader, he just took off".

In the 2017 World's Best Racehorse Rankings Merchant Navy was given a rating of 117, making him the 129th best racehorse in the world and the second best three-year-old in Australia.

After a break of over three months Merchant Navy returned on 10 February at Caulfield when he was matched against older horses for the first time in the Rubiton Stakes. He started favourite but despite producing a strong finish he came home third behind Super Cash and Flamberge. On 10 March the colt headed the betting for the Newmarket Handicap at Flemington when he was ridden by Chad Schofield. He was restrained towards the rear before producing his customary late charge but he was beaten a short head and a head by his older rivals Redkirk Warrior and Brave Smash in a three-way photo finish.

=== 2018: four-year-old season ===
In the spring of 2018, Merchant Navy moved to the northern hemisphere and joined the stable of Aidan O'Brien at Ballydoyle in Ireland. His relocation followed his partial acquisition by John Magnier's Coolmore Stud and he henceforth raced for a partnership including Susan Magnier, Derrick Smith and Michael Tabor as well as the "Merchant Navy Syndicate". His first run in Europe came in the Group 3 Greenlands Stakes over six furlongs at the Curragh on 26 May in which he was ridden by Ryan Moore and started the 9/2 third choice in the betting behind Brando (Prix Maurice de Gheest) and Tasleet (Duke of York Stakes). He started slowly but moved up into third place entering the final furlong before staying on strongly to take the lead in the closing stages and win by a length from Spirit of Valor.

At Royal Ascot on 23 June Merchant Navy contested the Diamond Jubilee Stakes and started at odds of 4/1 in a twelve-runner field. Harry Angel started favourite, while the other runners included Redkirk Warrior, The Tin Man, Librisa Breeze (British Champions Sprint Stakes), City Light (Prix de Saint-Georges), Bound For Nowhere (Shakertown Stakes), D'Bai (John of Gaunt Stakes) and Spirit of Valor. Partnered by Moore, Merchant Navy tracked the leaders before making a forward move approaching the final furlong but was hampered when the early leader Bound For Nowhere hung to the left. He gained the advantage in the final strides but was strongly challenged by the French horse City Light and the pair crossed the line together. Although City Light appeared to have won the race the photo finish revealed that Merchant Navy had hung on to prevail by a short head. After the race O'Brien said "We thought it was kind of an impossible task for him... I can’t tell you how happy we are. He is relaxed, genuine, a good mover and has a good mind. He is very docile. He has no problem in any way. He is really a joy to do anything with".

Less than a week after his win at Ascot it was announced that Merchant Navy had been retired from racing to become a breeding stallion for the Coolmore Stud.

In the 2018 World's Best Racehorse Rankings Merchant Navy was given a rating of 118, making him the 78th best racehorse in the world and the fifth best sprinter in Europe.

== Stud career ==
After initially standing as a sire at Coolmore Stud, Merchant Navy was sold to Kooringal Stud, where as of 2023 has a service fee of $23,200.

=== Notable progeny ===
c = colt, f = filly, g = gelding

Foaled	Name	Sex	Major wins
2019	Royal Merchant	f	The Goodwood

== Pedigree ==
Pedigree of Merchant Navy (AUS), bay stallion, 2014
Sire Fastnet Rock (AUS) 2001	Danehill (USA); 1986	Danzig	Northern Dancer (CAN)
Sire Fastnet Rock (AUS) 2001	Danehill (USA); 1986	Danzig	Pas de Nom
Sire Fastnet Rock (AUS) 2001	Danehill (USA); 1986	Razyana	His Majesty
Sire Fastnet Rock (AUS) 2001	Danehill (USA); 1986	Razyana	Spring Adieu (CAN)
Sire Fastnet Rock (AUS) 2001	Piccadilly Circus; 1995	Royal Academy (USA)	Nijinsky (CAN)
Sire Fastnet Rock (AUS) 2001	Piccadilly Circus; 1995	Royal Academy (USA)	Crimson Saint
Sire Fastnet Rock (AUS) 2001	Piccadilly Circus; 1995	Gatana	Marauding (NZ)
Sire Fastnet Rock (AUS) 2001	Piccadilly Circus; 1995	Gatana	Twigalae
Dam Legally Bay (AUS) 2000	Snippets; 1984	Lunchtime (GB)	Silly Season (USA)
Dam Legally Bay (AUS) 2000	Snippets; 1984	Lunchtime (GB)	Great Occasion
Dam Legally Bay (AUS) 2000	Snippets; 1984	Easy Date	Grand Chaudiere (GB)
Dam Legally Bay (AUS) 2000	Snippets; 1984	Easy Date	Scampering
Dam Legally Bay (AUS) 2000	Decidity; 1993	Last Tycoon (IRE)	Try My Best (USA)
Dam Legally Bay (AUS) 2000	Decidity; 1993	Last Tycoon (IRE)	Mill Princess
Dam Legally Bay (AUS) 2000	Decidity; 1993	Class	Twig Moss (FR)
Dam Legally Bay (AUS) 2000	Decidity; 1993	Class	Pirouette (Family: 1-n)
