= Coeursamba =

French-bred Thoroughbred racehorse

- Sire: The Wow Signal
- Grandsire: Starspangledbanner
- Dam: Marechale
- Damsire: Anabaa
- Sex: Mare
- Foaled: 26 March 2018
- Country: France
- Colour: Bay
- Breeder: Julie Mestrallet, Francine Mestrallet Mercier & Agathe Cousin
- Owner: Ecurie J L Tepper; Abdullah bin Fahad Al Attiyah
- Trainer: Jean-Claude Rouget
- Record: 11: 2-0-4
- Earnings: £301,020

Major wins
- Poule d'Essai des Pouliches (2021)

Coeursamba (foaled 26 March 2018) is a French Thoroughbred racehorse. She showed high-class form as a juvenile in 2020 when she won one race and was placed in both the Prix Six Perfections and the Prix d'Aumale. In the following spring she took the Group 1 Poule d'Essai des Pouliches.

== Background ==
Coeursamba is a bay filly with a white star and two white socks bred in France by Julie Mestrallet, Francine Mestrallet Mercier & Agathe Cousin. As a foal in December 2018 she was consigned to the Arqana Breeding Stock Sale at Deauville and bought for €24,000 by MAB Agency. She returned to the Deauville sales ring in August 2019 when she was sold for €40,000 to the trainer Jean-Claude Rouget. The filly was taken into training by Rouget and initially raced in the colours of Ecurie J L Tepper. Coeursamba has been ridden in all of her races by Cristian Demuro.

She was from the first crop of foals sired by The Wow Signal, an Irish-bred stallion who won the Prix Morny in 2014. Coeursamba's dam Marechale showed no racing ability, failing to win in eight starts. She was a female-line descendant of the Prix de l'Arc de Triomphe winner Pearl Cap, making her a distant relative of Pearl Diver, Belmez, Molvedo and Sleeping Partner.

== Racing career ==
=== 2020: two-year-old season ===
Coeursamba began her racing career on 25 May when she finished second to Madouss in a contest for previously unraced fillies over 1200 metres at Lyon Parilly Racecourse. Over the same distance at Saint-Cloud Racecourse on 30 June she started at odds of 6.2/1 for a maiden race on good to soft ground and recorded her first success as she won by one and a quarter lengths from Jubilation. The filly was then stepped up in class and distance for the Group 3 Prix Six Perfections over 1400 metres at Deauville Racecourse on 1 August and came home third behind See The Rose and Wedding Dance, finishing a length behind the winner. On 10 September at Longchamp Racecourse she started favourite for the Group 3 Prix d'Aumale but finished third again, beaten one and a half lengths and half a length by King's Harlequin and Harajuku.

On 3 October as Saint-Cloud, Coeursamba was put up for auction at Saint-Cloud and was bought for €400,000 by Haras du Saubouas on behalf of Abdullah bin Fahad Al Attiyah. On the following afternoon at Longchamp the filly ran in her new colours for the first time and finished fifth of the twelve runners behind Tiger Tanaka in the Group 1 Prix Marcel Boussac, staying on well in the closing stages. On her final run of the year Coeursamba came home fourth behind the British-trained favourite Lullaby Moon in the Group 3 Prix Miesque at Chantilly Racecourse on 31 October.

=== 2021: three-year-old season ===
On her first appearance of 2021 Coeursamba finished third behind Tahlie and Alula Borealis in the Prix du Louvre over 1600 metres at Longchamp on 22 April. On 16 May the filly went off a 38/1 outsider for the Poule d'Essai des Pouliches over 1600 metres on very soft ground at Longchamp. Mother Earth started favourite, while the other eleven contenders included Tiger Tanaka, Lullaby Moon, King's Harlequin, See The Rose, Philomene (Prix Penelope), Rougir (Prix des Reservoirs) and Reina Madre (Prix Imprudence). Demuro positioned Coeursamba in mid-division on the inside rail as the outsider Stardevote set the pace before driving her way between rivals to join the leaders in the straight. She got the better of Mother Earth inside the last 100 metres and prevailed by a length. After the race Jean-Claude Rouget said: "It's a very pleasant surprise and what I loved was that she showed that double acceleration you associate with the good horses; that makes it very interesting for the rest of the season. She went back to her owners' farm over the winter and we were in no rush to have her out this spring as she had plenty of experience at two. I decided to give her a quiet comeback and make sure she didn't have a hard race. After that, everything worked out because she had a good draw and she is streetwise."

Coeursamba was moved up in distance for the Prix de Diane over 2100 metres at Chantilly on 20 June. She never looked likely to win after being denied a clear run in the straight and came home eleventh of the seventeen runners, four lengths behind the Irish-trained winner Joan of Arc. On 24 June it was announced that Coeursamba had been bought by Katsumi Yoshida of Northern Farm. At Deauville in August Coeursamba was matched against older fillies and mares in the Prix Rothschild over 1600 metres. She raced in mid-division before staying on well in the closing stages to come home sixth of the fourteen runners behind Mother Earth. In the Prix Daniel Wildenstein at Longchamp in October she finished eighth behind Real World, beaten almost fifteen lengths by the winner.

== Pedigree ==
Pedigree of Coeursamba, bay filly, 2018
| Sire The Wow Signal (IRE) 2012 | Starspangledbanner (AUS); 2006 | Choisir | Danehill Dancer (IRE) |
| Sire The Wow Signal (IRE) 2012 | Starspangledbanner (AUS); 2006 | Choisir | Great Selection |
| Sire The Wow Signal (IRE) 2012 | Starspangledbanner (AUS); 2006 | Gold Anthem | Made of Gold (USA) |
| Sire The Wow Signal (IRE) 2012 | Starspangledbanner (AUS); 2006 | Gold Anthem | National Song |
| Sire The Wow Signal (IRE) 2012 | Muravka (IRE); 2008 | High Chaparral | Sadler's Wells |
| Sire The Wow Signal (IRE) 2012 | Muravka (IRE); 2008 | High Chaparral | Kasora |
| Sire The Wow Signal (IRE) 2012 | Muravka (IRE); 2008 | Tabdea (USA) | Topsider |
| Sire The Wow Signal (IRE) 2012 | Muravka (IRE); 2008 | Tabdea (USA) | Madame Secretary |
| Dam Marechale (FR) 2006 | Anabaa (USA); 1992 | Danzig | Northern Dancer (CAN) |
| Dam Marechale (FR) 2006 | Anabaa (USA); 1992 | Danzig | Pas de Nom |
| Dam Marechale (FR) 2006 | Anabaa (USA); 1992 | Balbonella (FR) | Gay Mecene (USA) |
| Dam Marechale (FR) 2006 | Anabaa (USA); 1992 | Balbonella (FR) | Bamieres |
| Dam Marechale (FR) 2006 | Malaisie (USA); 1993 | Bering (GB) | Arctic Tern (USA) |
| Dam Marechale (FR) 2006 | Malaisie (USA); 1993 | Bering (GB) | Beaune (FR) |
| Dam Marechale (FR) 2006 | Malaisie (USA); 1993 | Mother of Pearl (FR) | Sir Gaylord (USA) |
| Dam Marechale (FR) 2006 | Malaisie (USA); 1993 | Mother of Pearl (FR) | Pink Pearl (Family: 16-b) |
