= Gstaad (horse) =

British-bred, Irish-trained Thoroughbred racehorse

- Racing silks of Mr Derrick Smith
- Breed: Thoroughbred
- Sire: Starspangledbanner
- Grandsire: Choisir
- Dam: Mosa Mine
- Damsire: Exceed and Excel
- Sex: Colt
- Foaled: 22 March 2023 (age 3)
- Country: Great Britain
- Breeder: Maywood Stud
- Owner: Derrick Smith, Susan Magnier, & Michael Tabor
- Trainer: Aidan O'Brien
- Record: 12: 4-6-1
- Earnings: £1,692,443

Major wins
- Coventry Stakes (2025); Irish 2000 Guineas (2026); Breeders' Cup wins: Breeders' Cup Juvenile Turf (2025)

Awards
- Cartier Champion Two-year-old Colt (2025); Timeform rating: 126

Gstaad (foaled 22 March 2023) is a British-bred, Irish-trained Thoroughbred racehorse who was rated as the best two-year-old colt in Europe in 2025. He won the Coventry Stakes and finished as a runner up in 3 juvenile Group 1 races before winning the Grade 1 Breeders' Cup Juvenile Turf. As a three-year-old, he won the Irish 2000 Guineas and added further Group 1 placings, including runner-up efforts in the 2000 Guineas, St James's Palace Stakes, and Sussex Stakes.

== Background ==
Gstaad is a dark bay colt bred by Marywood Stud. He was sent into training with Aidan O'Brien at Ballydoyle and raced for the Coolmore partnership of Derrick Smith, Michael Tabor and Susan Magnier. He is sired by the 2009 Australian Champion Sprinter and 2010 Cartier Champion Sprinter Starspangledbanner out of a Exceed and Excel mare named Mosa Mine. His second dam Baldemosa, by Lead On Time, was a winning mare out of Bamieres and comes from the French family of Group 1 winner and leading sire Anabaa as well as Always Loyal.

His name came from a town named Gstaad in Saanen, a municipality of Bern in Switzerland, known a major ski resort and a popular destination amongst high society and the international jet set.

== Racing Statistics ==
Date	Distance (Condition)	Race	Class	Course	Field	HN	Odds	Finish	Time	Winning Margin	Jockey	(Runner-up)	Ref
2025 – Two-year-old season
17 May	5f 180y (Good)	Maiden		Navan	10	2	7/1	1st	1:12.35	3/4 length	Chris Hayes	(True Love)	
17 Jun	6f (Good to firm)	Coventry Stakes	G2	Ascot	20	9	7/2F	1st	1:13.43	3 lengths	Ryan Moore	(Do Or Do Not)	
24 Aug	1,200 m (Good)	Prix Morny	G1	Deauville	6	3	5/6	2nd	1:08.39	(short neck)	Ryan Moore	Venetian Sun	
14 Sep	7f (Yielding)	Vincent O'Brien National Stakes	G1	Curragh	6	2	10/11	2nd	1:26.73	(head)	Christophe Soumillon	Zavateri	
11 Oct	7f (Good to firm)	Dewhurst Stakes	G1	Newmarket	9	4	7/4F	2nd	1:23.39	(3/4 length)	Christophe Soumillon	Gewan	
31 Oct	1m (Firm)	Breeders' Cup Juvenile Turf	G1	Del Mar	14	14	1.20F	1st	1:34.93	3/4 length	Christophe Soumillon	(Stark Contrast)	
2026 – Three-year-old season
2 May	1m (Good to firm)	2000 Guineas	G1	Newmarket	14	6	3/1	2nd	1:35.59	(2 3/4 lengths)	Ryan Moore	Bow Echo	
23 May	1m (Good)	Irish 2,000 Guineas	G1	Curragh	9	5	4/11F	1st	1:35.69	3 lengths	Ryan Moore	(Distant Storm)	
16 Jun	7f 213y (Good to firm)	St James's Palace Stakes	G1	Ascot	6	2	2/1	2nd	1:38.48	(short head)	Ryan Moore	Bow Echo	
29 Jul	1m (Good to firm)	Sussex Stakes	G1	Goodwood	12	10	4/1	2nd	1:36.03	(1/2 length)	Ryan Moore	Bow Echo	
6 Sep	1,600 m (Good to Soft)	Prix du Moulin de Longchamp	G1	Longchamp	7	5	8/11	3rd	1:33.01	(4 1/4 lengths)	Ryan Moore	Erdenali	
17 Oct	1m (Good)	Queen Elizabeth II Stakes	G1	Ascot	11	6	7/4F	8th	1:39.83	(8 1/2 lengths)	Ryan Moore	Talk of New York	

Legend:

- Official time of winning horse. The time written in grey doesn't belong to Gstaad.
