= Shake The Yoke =

British-bred Thoroughbred racehorse

- Sire: Caerleon
- Grandsire: Nijinsky
- Dam: Bermuda Classic
- Damsire: Double Form
- Sex: Mare
- Foaled: 1 April 1993
- Country: United Kingdom
- Colour: Dark Bay
- Breeder: The Sussex Stud & Calogo Bloodstock Agency
- Owner: Serge Brunswick; B. Wayne Hughes
- Trainer: Élie Lellouche; Ronald W. Ellis
- Record: 15: 5-5-1
- Earnings: $702,324

Major wins
- Prix d'Aumale (1995); Prix de la Grotte (1996); Coronation Stakes (1996); Wilshire Handicap (1998)

Shake The Yoke (foaled 1 April 1993) was a British-bred Thoroughbred racehorse and broodmare. Originally trained in France, she showed good form as a two-year-old, winning the Prix d'Aumale and finishing second in the Prix Marcel Boussac. In the following year she won the Prix de la Grotte by ten lengths and recorded her biggest success when taking the Coronation Stakes at Royal Ascot. In the same year she finished second in both the Poule d'Essai des Pouliches and the Queen Elizabeth II Challenge Cup Stakes and third in the Prix du Moulin. She was then exported to the United States where she took time to adapt to her new conditions, but won the Wilshire Handicap as a five-year-old in 1998. She later had some success as a broodmare, producing several winners.

== Background ==
Shake The Yoke was a dark bay mare bred in the United Kingdom by The Sussex Stud & Calogo Bloodstock Agency. She was sired by Caerleon, an American-bred colt who won the Prix du Jockey Club and the Benson and Hedges Gold Cup in 1983 when trained in Ireland by Vincent O'Brien. Caerleon sired many other good winners including Generous, Marienbard, Lady Carla, Cape Verdi and Warrsan. Her dam Bermuda Classic showed good form as a two-year-old in 1985, winning the Railway Stakes and the Curragh Stakes. She was a distant descendant of Caerlissa, an influential broodmare whose other descendants included St. Paddy and Flying Water.

The filly entered the ownership of Serge Brunswick and was sent into training with Élie Lellouche in France. The phrase "shake the yoke" is a quotation from Romeo and Juliet.

== Racing career ==
=== 1995: two-year-old season ===
As a two-year-old, Shake The Yoke was ridden in all four of her races by Dominique Boeuf. On her racecourse debut, the filly finished last of the four runners in the Prix des Roches over 1400 metres at Deauville Racecourse on 6 August. Three weeks later at the same course she finished eighth of the nine runners in a Listed race over 1300 metres. Despite her modest form, the filly was then moved up in class to contest the Group Three Prix d'Aumale over 1600 metres on very soft ground at Longchamp Racecourse in September. Starting at odds of 10.1/1 she took the lead approaching the last 200 metres and won by two lengths from Miss Tahiti. On 1 October, over the same course and distance, Shake The Yoke started the 2.9/1 favourite for the Group One Prix Marcel Boussac. She took the lead in the straight but was overtaken and beaten two lengths into second by Miss Tahiti.

=== 1996: three-year-old season ===
On her three-year-old debut, Shake The Yoke met Miss Tahiti yet again in the Prix La Grotte on good to firm ground at Longchamp on 21 April. She took the lead approaching the final 200 metres and sprinted clear of the field to win by ten lengths from Raisonnable in "very impressive" style. On 1 May Shake The Yoke started the 3/5 favourite against eight opponents in the Poule d'Essai des Pouliches. After turning into the straight in sixth place she made steady progress in the straight but was unable to catch the British-trained filly Ta Rib and finished second, beaten three quarters of a length.

In June, Shake The Yoke was sent to England to contest the Group One Coronation Stakes over one mile at Royal Ascot, with Olivier Peslier taking over from Boeuf. She started favourite ahead of Ta Rib, with the other contenders including Dance Design (runner-up in the Irish 1,000 Guineas), Last Second (C L Weld Park Stakes), Priory Belle (Moyglare Stud Stakes) and Thrilling Day (Nell Gwyn Stakes). After being restrained in the early stages, STY moved forward approaching the straight, took the lead from Dance Design inside the final furlong and won by a neck from the fast-finishing Last Second. After the race, Lellouche explained that Bouef had been replaced after criticism of his performance on the filly at Longchamp, describing the decision as a "rap on the knuckles" for the jockey.

The filly was then bought privately by the American businessman B. Wayne Hughes. In the Prix du Moulin at Longchamp in September, Shake The Yoke was matched against colts and older horses for the first time. Ridden by Sylvain Guillot she finished strongly to take third behind the colts Ashkalani and Spinning World. On her final appearance of the year, the filly was sent to the United States for the Grade I Queen Elizabeth II Challenge Cup Stakes at Keeneland Racecourse on 5 October in which she was partnered by Eddie Delahoussaye and finished second to Memories of Silver.

=== 1997 & 1998: later career ===
For the 1997 season Shake The Yoke was transferred to race permanently in the United States where she was trained by Ronald W. Ellis. On her only appearance of that year she finished in distress when last of six in an allowance race at Santa Anita Park in January.

After of a break of more than a year, the mare returned to finished sixth in an allowance over six and a half furlongs at Santa Anita in February 1998. Later that month at the same course she showed a return to form when she finished second to Dance Parade in the Grade II Buena Vista Handicap and in March she was second again, behind Fiji in the Santa Ana Handicap. In April Shake The Yoke recorded her first win in twenty one months when she was four length winner of a one-mile allowance race at Santa Anita. On 9 May, ridden by Delahoussaye, the mare started the 1.4/1 favourite for the Wilshire Handicap over one mile at Hollywood Park Racetrack. She accelerated through a gap to take the lead in the straight and drew away to win by three lengths from Traces of Gold. After the race Ellis said "She's really starting to learn what it's all about here in America... I was worried about her getting through, but I've found out that when you've got the best horse, they usually find a way to get through those little holes. I just don't think they have any bigger heart than she does".

== Breeding record ==
Shake The Yoke was retired from racing to become a broodmare for her owner's stud. She produced at least nine foals and seven winners between 2000 and 2008:

- Thirteen Colonies, a bay colt (later gelded), foaled in 2000, sired by Pleasant Colony. Won eight races.
- Shake Off, brown filly, 2001, by AP Indy. Won three races including the Grade II El Encino Stakes.
- I Can't Know, brown colt (later gelded), 2002, by Unbridled. Won two races.
- Shakenbythestorm, brown filly, 2003, by Storm Cat. Third on only start.
- Entourage, chestnut colt, 2004, by AP Indy. Won two races.
- Seek Peace, brown colt, 2005, by Seeking The Gold. Failed to win in five races.
- Serva Jugum, brown colt, 2006, by Fusaichi Pegasus. Won one race.
- USC Fight Song, brown colt, 2007, by Unbridled's Song. Won two races.
- Auspicious Star, bay colt (later gelded), 2008, by Malibu Moon. Won two races.
- Golden Gunners, bay colt (later gelded), 2009, by Malibu Moon. Exported to Hong Kong.

== Pedigree ==
Pedigree of Shake The Yoke (GB), dark bay mare, 1993
Sire Caerleon (USA) 1980	Nijinsky (CAN); 1967	Northern Dancer	Nearctic
Sire Caerleon (USA) 1980	Nijinsky (CAN); 1967	Northern Dancer	Natalma
Sire Caerleon (USA) 1980	Nijinsky (CAN); 1967	Flaming Page	Bull Page
Sire Caerleon (USA) 1980	Nijinsky (CAN); 1967	Flaming Page	Flaring Top
Sire Caerleon (USA) 1980	Foreseer (USA); 1969	Round Table	Princequillo
Sire Caerleon (USA) 1980	Foreseer (USA); 1969	Round Table	Knight's Daughter
Sire Caerleon (USA) 1980	Foreseer (USA); 1969	Regal Gleam	Hail To Reason
Sire Caerleon (USA) 1980	Foreseer (USA); 1969	Regal Gleam	Miz Carol
Dam Bermuda Classic (IRE) 1983	Double Form (IRE); 1975	Habitat	Sir Gaylord
Dam Bermuda Classic (IRE) 1983	Double Form (IRE); 1975	Habitat	Little Hut
Dam Bermuda Classic (IRE) 1983	Double Form (IRE); 1975	Fanghorn	Crocket
Dam Bermuda Classic (IRE) 1983	Double Form (IRE); 1975	Fanghorn	Honeymoon House
Dam Bermuda Classic (IRE) 1983	Minnie Tudor (IRE); 1976	Tudor Melody	Tudor Minstrel
Dam Bermuda Classic (IRE) 1983	Minnie Tudor (IRE); 1976	Tudor Melody	Matelda
Dam Bermuda Classic (IRE) 1983	Minnie Tudor (IRE); 1976	Tiny Toque	High Hat
Dam Bermuda Classic (IRE) 1983	Minnie Tudor (IRE); 1976	Tiny Toque	Tena Mariata (Family:14-c)
