= Millisle (horse) =

Irish-bred Thoroughbred racehorse

- Racing silks of Stonethorn Stud Farms
- Sire: Starspangledbanner
- Grandsire: Choisir
- Dam: Green Castle
- Damsire: Indian Ridge
- Sex: Mare
- Foaled: 11 May 2017
- Country: Ireland
- Colour: Chestnut
- Breeder: Stonethorn Stud Farms
- Owner: Stonethorn Stud Farms
- Trainer: Jessica Harrington
- Record: 11: 4-3-0
- Earnings: £245,130

Major wins
- Curragh Stakes (2019); Cheveley Park Stakes (2019); Ballyogan Stakes (2020)

Millisle (foaled 11 May 2017) is an Irish Thoroughbred racehorse. As a two-year-old in 2019 she was the best filly of her age in Europe, winning three races including the Curragh Stakes and the Cheveley Park Stakes as well as finishing second in the Dick Poole Fillies' Stakes and ending the season with a rating of 115. She was less successful as a three-year-old but added another major win when taking the Ballyogan Stakes.

== Background ==
Millisle is a chestnut mare with a white blaze and two white socks bred and owned by the Newtownards-based Stonethorn Stud Farms. She was sent into training with Jessica Harrington at Moone, County Kildare. The mare is named after Millisle, a village in County Down.

She was sired by Starpangledbanner who was a champion sprinter in Australia before relocating to Europe where he won the Golden Jubilee Stakes and July Cup in 2010 and took the Cartier Champion Sprinter award. As a breeding stallion he had serious fertility problems, but sired a few other good horses including The Wow Signal, Home of the Brave (John of Gaunt Stakes) and Anthem Alexander (Queen Mary Stakes). Millisle's dam Green Castle showed little racing ability, failing to win in two starts as a four-year-old in 2003. Her dam Green Lucia, who finished second in the Yorkshire Oaks, was a half-sister to Old Vic and closely related to High Top.

== Racing career ==
=== 2019: two-year-old season ===
On her racecourse debut Millisle started the 5/2 second favourite for a five furlong maiden race at Bellewstown on 4 July. Ridden by the apprentice jockey Tom Madden she raced in second place before going to the front and drew away in the final furlong to win "comfortably" by four and three quarter lengths. The filly was ridden in her races for the rest of the year by Shane Foley. On 26 July she started odds-on favourite for a minor event at Down Royal but after briefly taking the lead in the last quarter mile she was overtaken and beaten into second place by Think Big. At the Curragh Racecourse on 16 August Millisle was stepped up to Listed class and went off the 11/2 fourth choice in a six-runner field for the Curragh Stakes. Racing on soft ground she tracked the leaders for most of the way before staying on strongly in the closing stages to win by half a length from Isabeau.

For her next race Millisle was sent to England and moved up in class and distance to contest the Group 3 Dick Poole Fillies' Stakes over six furlongs at Salisbury Racecourse on 5 September. She led for most of the way but despite running "very gamely" she was overtaken in the closing stages and beaten a short head by Dark Lady. Thirty-five minutes before the start of the race a British Horseracing Authority vet had taken a blood sample from the filly and Harrington felt that this may have affected her performance. She commented "I do not want this to come across as sour grapes but she was beaten a short-head and small margins make the difference".

Thirteen days after her defeat at Salisbury, Millisle made a second trip to England and started a 16/1 outsider for the Group 1 Cheveley Park Stakes over six furlongs at Newmarket Racecourse. Raffle Prize, who had won the Queen Mary Stakes and the Duchess of Cambridge Stakes before finishing second to Earthlight in the Prix Morny started odds-on favourite, while the other nine runners included Dark Lady, Tropbeau (Prix du Calvados), Etoile (Fillies' Sprint Stakes) and Living In The Past (Lowther Stakes). Millisle started quickly but then dropped back in the field as Tango set the pace before giving way to Raffle Prize at half way. Millisle began to make progress approaching the final furlong, and sustained her run to overtake Raffle Prize in the closing stages and win by one and three quarter lengths. Foley, who was winning his first Group 1 race in England commented "She's an amazing little filly. I've loved her from day one. She was outpaced throughout but I knew when she hit the rising ground she'd stay home, and she enjoyed that nice ground."

=== 2020: three-year-old season ===
The flat racing season in Britain and Ireland was disrupted by the COVID-19 pandemic and the 1000 Guineas was run a month later than usual on 7 June over the Rowley mile at Newmarket. Millisle started the 4/1 joint second favourite but after being in contention in the early stages she dropped away and came home seventh of the fifteen runners, ten lengths behind the winner Love. At Royal Ascot in June she was brought back to sprint distances for the Commonwealth Cup over six furlongs and finished fifth behind Golden Horde. At Naas Racecourse on 4 July she was dropped to Group 3 class and ran second to the British-trained colt Art Power in the Lacken Stakes over six furlongs.

Eighteen days after her defeat in the Lacken Stakes Millisle contested the Group 3 Ballyogan Stakes over the same course and distance and went off the 9/4 second favourite behind the four-year-old filly Forever In Dreams. Ridden by Foley, Millisle raced in second place behind the favourite before taking the lead two furlongs out and quickly drew clear to win "readily" by four lengths from Pronouncement despite being eased down in the final strides. Foley commented "She's a very good filly and was beaten by a very good horse last time. In fairness to her, we were training her all Spring to see if she would get a mile and trying to settle and relax her and get her to switch off. The Guineas was a non-event, but she showed today that she is a comfortable high cruiser back to what she is best at."

Millisle failed to reproduce her best form in two subsequent races, finishing sixth to Glen Shiel when favourite for the Phoenix Sprint Stakes at the Curragh on 9 August and then running fifth behind Jouska in the Listed Boadicea Stakes on 10 October at Newmarket.

== Pedigree ==
Pedigree of Millisle (IRE), chestnut filly, 2017
Sire Starspangledbanner (AUS) 2006	Choisir (AUS); 1999	Danehill Dancer (IRE)	Danehill (USA)
Sire Starspangledbanner (AUS) 2006	Choisir (AUS); 1999	Danehill Dancer (IRE)	Mira Adonde (USA)
Sire Starspangledbanner (AUS) 2006	Choisir (AUS); 1999	Great Selection	Lunchtime (GB)
Sire Starspangledbanner (AUS) 2006	Choisir (AUS); 1999	Great Selection	Pensive Mood
Sire Starspangledbanner (AUS) 2006	Gold Anthem (AUS); 1999	Made of Gold (USA)	Green Forest
Sire Starspangledbanner (AUS) 2006	Gold Anthem (AUS); 1999	Made of Gold (USA)	Vindaria
Sire Starspangledbanner (AUS) 2006	Gold Anthem (AUS); 1999	National Song	Vain
Sire Starspangledbanner (AUS) 2006	Gold Anthem (AUS); 1999	National Song	Olympic Aim (NZ)
Dam Green Castle (IRE) 1999	Indian Ridge (IRE); 1985	Ahonoora (GB)	Lorenzaccio
Dam Green Castle (IRE) 1999	Indian Ridge (IRE); 1985	Ahonoora (GB)	Helen Nichols
Dam Green Castle (IRE) 1999	Indian Ridge (IRE); 1985	Hillbrow (GB)	Swing Easy (USA)
Dam Green Castle (IRE) 1999	Indian Ridge (IRE); 1985	Hillbrow (GB)	Golden City
Dam Green Castle (IRE) 1999	Green Lucia (GB); 1980	Green Dancer (USA)	Nijinsky (CAN)
Dam Green Castle (IRE) 1999	Green Lucia (GB); 1980	Green Dancer (USA)	Green Valley (FR)
Dam Green Castle (IRE) 1999	Green Lucia (GB); 1980	Cockade	Derring-Do
Dam Green Castle (IRE) 1999	Green Lucia (GB); 1980	Cockade	Camenae (Family: 11-a)
