= The Wow Signal =

Irish-bred Thoroughbred racehorse

- Sire: Starspangledbanner
- Grandsire: Choisir
- Dam: Muravka
- Damsire: High Chaparral
- Sex: Stallion
- Foaled: 27 February 2012
- Country: Ireland
- Colour: Bay
- Breeder: Mr T Stack
- Owner: Ross Harmon; Al Shaqab Racing
- Trainer: John Quinn
- Record: 4: 3-0-0
- Earnings: £238,915

Major wins
- Coventry Stakes (2014); Prix Morny (2014)

Awards
- Top-rated 2-y-o colt in France (2014)

The Wow Signal (27 February 2012 – March 2018) was an Irish-bred, British-trained Thoroughbred racehorse and sire. He raced only as a juvenile in 2014 when he won his first three races including the Coventry Stakes and the Prix Morny. He ran poorly on his only subsequent start and was retired to stud duty. He had fertility problems and sired relatively few foals before dying at the age of six.

== Background ==
The Wow Signal was a bay horse with a small white star and three white socks bred in Ireland by Tommy Stack. At the Tattersalls Ireland sale in September 2013 the yearling was put up for auction and sold for €13,000 to the Lynn Lodge Stud. In April 2014 the two-year-old colt was entered in the Ascot Select Sale, a "breeze-up" event in which the entrants are required to be ridden in a public gallop before entering the auction ring. He was bought for £50,000 by Sean Quinn on behalf of his father John Quinn. The colt entered the ownership of Ross Harmon and was taken into training with John Quinn at the Bellwood Cottage Stables at Settrington, North Yorkshire.

He was sired by Starspangledbanner who was a champion sprinter in Australia before relocating to Europe where he won the Golden Jubilee Stakes and July Cup in 2010 and won the Cartier Champion Sprinter award. As a breeding stallion he had serious fertility problems, but sired a few other good horses including Home of the Brave (John of Gaunt Stakes) and Anthem Alexander (Queen Mary Stakes). The Wow Signal's dam Muravka never raced but did better as a broodmare, also producing the Listed winner Miss Infinity. Her dam Tabdea was a half-sister to Ta Rib and a descendant of the American broodmare Dust Whirl (foaled 1928), making her a distant relative of Whirlaway and Conquistador Cielo.

The colt was named after the Wow! signal, a strong narrowband radio signal which has been suggested to be of extraterrestrial origin.

== Racing career ==
=== 2014: two-year-old season ===
On his racecourse debut, The Wow Signal contested a maiden race over six furlongs at Ayr Racecourse on 21 May in which he was ridden by Phillip Makin and won by nine lengths. Following his success the colt was acquired privately by the Joaan Al Thani's Al Shaqab Racing organisation. John Quinn explained that while he had received many offers, the Al Shaqab's bid was the only one which promised that he could continue training the horse.

Frankie Dettori took the ride when the colt was moved up sharply in class for the Group 2 Coventry Stakes over the same distance at Royal Ascot on 17 June. He was made the 5/1 joint-favourite alongside Adaay, while the other thirteen runners were headed by War Envoy, Kool Kompany and Cappella Sansevero (Marble Hill Stakes). After racing in second place, The Wow Signal took the lead a furlong out and won by one and three quarter lengths from Cappella Sansevero. After the race Dettori said "I was worried about the ground being a bit quick but he showed tremendous courage, he's a real good two-year-old".

After a two-month break, The Wow Signal was sent to France and stepped up to Group 1 class and sent to France for the Prix Morny over 1200 metres at Deauville Racecourse on 24 August. He had been originally aimed at the Phoenix Stakes earlier that month but was withdrawn after he was found to be suffering from a minor respiratory infection. He started joint-favourite with Ervedya in a nine-runner field for the Morny which also included the American-trained colt Hootenanny (Windsor Castle Stakes) and Goken (Prix du Bois). After being positioned in mid-division by Dettori, he moved up to join Hootenanny in the last 200 metres and got the better of the American challenger in the final strides to win by half a length. Following the colt's victory, John Quinn said "It's a great day... these are the days you dream of. Everyone works hard and you hope you might come across a horse like him". Al Shaqab's racing manager Harry Herbert commented "It was a really superb performance over a trip that is probably getting too short for him...It became a real slog but he's such a tough horse, he battled it out and it's a terrific training performance".

For his final run of the season The Wow Signal was sent to France again and started 7/4 favourite for the Group 1 Prix Jean-Luc Lagardère over 1400 metres at Longchamp Racecourse. He led for most of the way but weakened abruptly in the last 400 metres and came home last of the nine runners behind the subsequently disqualified Gleneagles. Quinn commented "I suppose it's been a long year for him, unlike some he's been to all the big gigs, and he's off on a long holiday now, but his form is rock solid and he'll be back."

In the official European two-year-old classification for 2014 The Wow Signal was given a rating of 116 (level with Gleneagles and Richard Pankhurst), making him the fifth-best colt of the year behind Belardo, Charming Thought, Elm Park and Ivawood. He tied with Gleneagles as the best two-year-old colt to race in France.

=== 2015: three-year-old season ===
The Wow Signal was being prepared for a run in the 2000 Guineas when he sustained an injury in May and was retired from racing. John Quinn described him as "a very tough horse with a great constitution and tremendous acceleration who ran well on all types of ground".

== Stud record ==
The Wow Signal began his career as a breeding stallion in Australia in late 2015 before returning to stand at Al Shaqab's Haras de Bouquetot at Clarbec in Normandy. Like his sire he was sub-fertile and sired relatively few foals in either location. He died in March 2018 after suffering from laminitis.

=== Notable progeny ===
c = colt, f = filly, g = gelding

Foaled	Name	Dam	Sex	Major wins
2018	Coeursamba	Marechale	f	Poule d'Essai des Pouliches

== Pedigree ==
Pedigree of The Wow Signal (IRE), bay stallion, 2012
Sire Starspangledbanner (AUS) 2006	Choisir (AUS); 1999	Danehill Dancer (IRE)	Danehill (USA)
Sire Starspangledbanner (AUS) 2006	Choisir (AUS); 1999	Danehill Dancer (IRE)	Mira Adonde (USA)
Sire Starspangledbanner (AUS) 2006	Choisir (AUS); 1999	Great Selection	Lunchtime (GB)
Sire Starspangledbanner (AUS) 2006	Choisir (AUS); 1999	Great Selection	Pensive Mood
Sire Starspangledbanner (AUS) 2006	Gold Anthem (AUS); 1999	Made of Gold (USA)	Green Forest
Sire Starspangledbanner (AUS) 2006	Gold Anthem (AUS); 1999	Made of Gold (USA)	Vindaria
Sire Starspangledbanner (AUS) 2006	Gold Anthem (AUS); 1999	National Song	Vain
Sire Starspangledbanner (AUS) 2006	Gold Anthem (AUS); 1999	National Song	Olympic Aim (NZ)
Dam Muravka (IRE) 2008	High Chaparral (IRE); 1999	Sadler's Wells (USA)	Northern Dancer (CAN)
Dam Muravka (IRE) 2008	High Chaparral (IRE); 1999	Sadler's Wells (USA)	Fairy Bridge
Dam Muravka (IRE) 2008	High Chaparral (IRE); 1999	Kasora	Darshaan (GB)
Dam Muravka (IRE) 2008	High Chaparral (IRE); 1999	Kasora	Kozana (GB)
Dam Muravka (IRE) 2008	Tabdea (USA); 1987	Topsider	Northern Dancer (CAN)
Dam Muravka (IRE) 2008	Tabdea (USA); 1987	Topsider	Drumtop
Dam Muravka (IRE) 2008	Tabdea (USA); 1987	Madame Secretary	Secretariat
Dam Muravka (IRE) 2008	Tabdea (USA); 1987	Madame Secretary	Ruby Tuesday (Family: 8-h)

- The Wow Signal was inbred 4 × 4 to Northern Dancer, meaning that this stallion appears twice in the fourth generation of his pedigree.
