= Heritage Stakes =

Annual flat horse race in Ireland

Heritage Stakes
2026
The Lion In Winter	Expanded	Norwalk Havoc

Previous years
2025
Lord Massusus	Mutasarref	Thalara
2024
Goldana	Power Under Me	Lord Massusus
2023
Buckaroo	Homeless Songs	Mea Domina
2022
Pearls Galore	Pretreville	Cadillac
2021
Lope Y Fernandez	Saltonstall	Koolasice

2020-2011
2020
Ancient Spirit	Buckhurst	Trais Fluors
2019
Imaging	Zihba	Surrounding
2018
On The Go Again	Onenightidreamed	Brendan Brackan
2017
Rose De Pierre	Marshall Jennings	Onenightidreamed
2016
Lily's Rainbow	Brendan Brackan	Flight Risk
2015
Fascinating Rock	Alive Alive Oh	Euphrasia
2014
Qewy	Pop Art	Kingsbarns
2013
Declaration Of War	Bold Thady Quill	Windsor Palace
2012
Famous Name	Sharestan	Northgate
2011
Famous Name	Finicius	Barack

2010-2004
2010
Famous Name	Recharge	Finicius
2009
Kargali	Three Rocks	Celtic Dane
2008
Tian Shan	Alarazi	Followmyfootsteps
2007
Danak	Heliostatic	Decado
2006
Mustameet	Hard Rock City	Democratic Deficit
2005
Solskjaer	Multazem	Zarad
2004
Tolpuddle	Eklim	Tipperary All Star

The Heritage Stakes is a Listed flat horse race in Ireland open to horses aged four years or older. It is run at Leopardstown over a distance of 1 mile (1,609 metres), and it is scheduled to take place each year in April.

The race was first run in 2004.

== Records ==
Most successful horse (3 wins):

- Famous Name – 2010,2011,2012

Leading jockey (6 wins):

- Pat Smullen - Tian Shan (2008), Famous Name (2010,2011,2012), Fascinating Rock (2015), Rose De Pierre (2017)

Leading trainer (7 wins):

- Dermot Weld – Tian Shan (2008), Famous Name (2010,2011,2012), Fascinating Rock (2015), Rose De Pierre (2017), Imaging (2019)

== Winners ==
Year	Winner	Age	Jockey	Trainer	Time
2004	Tolpuddle	4	Wayne Lordan	Tommy Stack	1:45.00
2005	Solskjaer	5	Seamie Heffernan	Aidan O'Brien	1:52.20
2006	Mustameet	5	Declan McDonogh	Kevin Prendergast	1:39.10
2007	Danak	4	Michael Kinane	John Oxx	1:39.40
2008	Tian Shan	4	Pat Smullen	Dermot Weld	1:43.53
2009	Kargali	4	Michael Kinane	John Oxx	1:40.83
2010	Famous Name	5	Pat Smullen	Dermot Weld	1:40.23
2011	Famous Name	6	Pat Smullen	Dermot Weld	1:40.17
2012	Famous Name	7	Pat Smullen	Dermot Weld	1:40.82
2013	Declaration of War	4	Joseph O'Brien	Aidan O'Brien	1:51.35
2014	Qewy	4	Declan McDonogh	John Oxx	1:49.46
2015	Fascinating Rock	4	Pat Smullen	Dermot Weld	1:46.17
2016	Lily's Rainbow	4	Billy Lee	Denise Foster	1:49.01
2017	Rose De Pierre	4	Pat Smullen	Dermot Weld	1:45.01
2018	On The Go Again	5	Gary Carroll	Michael Mulvany	1:55.99
2019	Imaging	4	Oisin Orr	Dermot Weld	1:44.99
2020	Ancient Spirit (Note: The 2020 race was run at Navan in June due to the COVID-19 pandemic in the Republic of Ireland)	5	Shane Foley	Jessica Harrington	1:41.08
2021	Lope Y Fernandez	4	Seamie Heffernan	Aidan O'Brien	1:41.27
2022	Pearls Galore	5	Billy Lee	Paddy Twomey	1:42.63
2023	Buckaroo	4	Oisin Murphy	Joseph O'Brien	1:50.91
2024	Goldana	5	Dylan Browne McMonagle	Joseph O'Brien	1:53.95
2025	Lord Massusus	5	Gary Carroll	Joseph Murphy	1:41.21
2026	The Lion In Winter	4	Wayne Lordan	Aidan O'Brien	1:46.62

== See also ==
- Horse racing in Ireland
- List of Irish flat horse races
