= Fastnet Rock (horse) =

Australian-bred Thoroughbred racehorse (2001–2025)

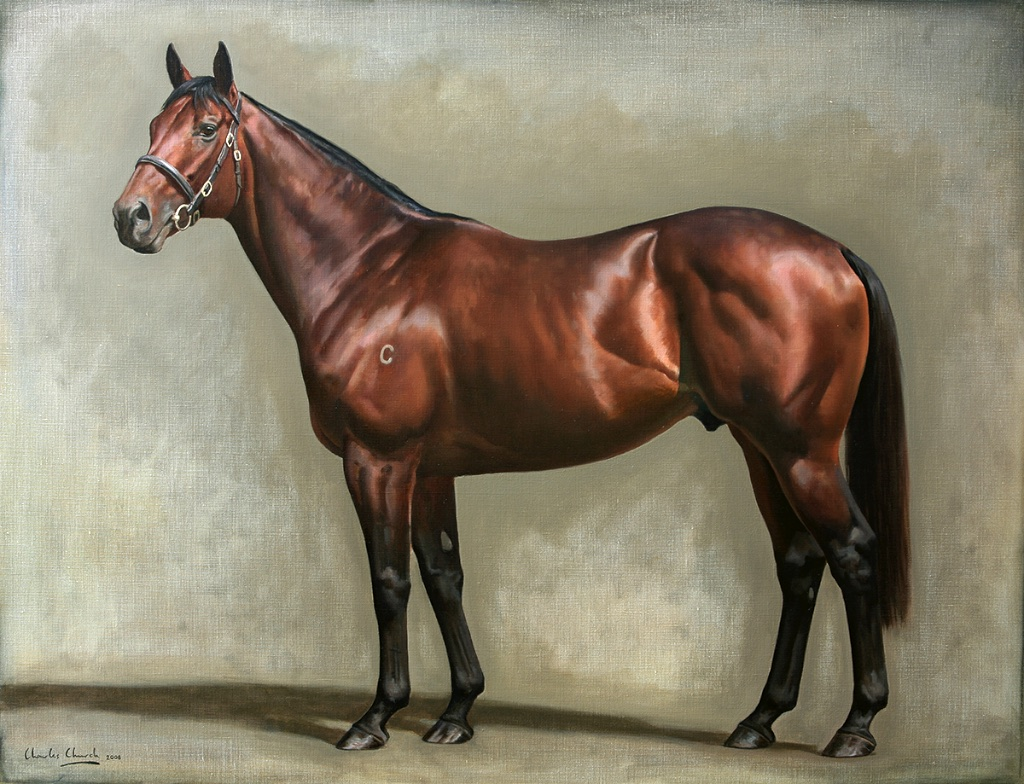
- Fastnet Rock: Winner of the 2005 Lightning Stakes and Oakleigh Plate, by Charles Church
- Sire: Danehill (US)
- Grandsire: Danzig
- Dam: Piccadilly Circus
- Damsire: Royal Academy (US)
- Sex: Stallion
- Foaled: 22 September 2001
- Died: 8 September 2025 (aged 23)
- Country: Australia
- Colour: Bay
- Breeder: Linley Investments, Austramore Pty Ltd, Hamilton Stud a.o.
- Owner: S Magnier a.o.
- Trainer: Paul Perry
- Record: 19: 6 – 7 – 2
- Earnings: A$1,654,100

Major wins
- Up and Coming Stakes (2004); Roman Consul Stakes (2004); L'Oréal Plate (2004); Lexus Classic (2004); Lightning Stakes (2005); Oakleigh Plate (2005)

Awards
- Australian Champion Sprinter (2004/05); Australian Champion Three Year Old Colt/Gelding (2004/05); Australian Champion Stallion (2011/12), (2014/15)
- Last updated on 20 May 2009

Fastnet Rock (22 September 2001 – 8 September 2025) was an Australian Thoroughbred racehorse stallion.

Sired by Danehill to dam Piccadilly Circus, he started his racing career in 2004. Though he did not win any races as a two-year-old, he ran third in the Group One AJC Sires Produce Stakes. He found great success after turning three years old. After being unplaced in the Caulfield Guineas, he proved himself as one of the top Australian sprinters by winning the Group 1 Lightning Stakes and Oakleigh Plate in February 2005.

Trainer Paul Perry wished Fastnet Rock to repeat the successful English campaign by Choisir, who was trained by Perry, in 2003. After he ran second in the T J Smith Stakes in March 2005, Fastnet Rock was sent to the United Kingdom to prepare for the Group 1 Golden Jubilee Stakes and July Cup. He suffered from travel sickness and was unable to run in any race in the UK and was retired to stud. Fastnet Rock was euthanised on 8 September 2025, aged 23.

== Race record ==
2003–04 season as a two-year-old
| Result | Date | Race | Venue | Group | Distance | Weight (kg) | Jockey | Winner/2nd |
|---|---|---|---|---|---|---|---|---|
| 5th | 24 Jan 2004 | 2yo Hcp | Rosehill | NA | 1100 m | 55.5 | C. Brown | 1st – Wager |
| 2nd | 07 Feb 2004 | 2yo Hcp | Rosehill | NA | 1100 m | 55 | C. Brown | 1st – Wager |
| 4th | 21 Feb 2004 | Silver Slipper Stakes | Rosehill | G2 | 1100 m | 56.5 | L. Beasley | 1st – Ballybleue |
| 2nd | 13 Mar 2004 | Skyline Stakes | Canterbury | G3 | 1200 m | 55.5 | D. Beadman | 1st – Dance Hero |
| 2nd | 27 Mar 2004 | Pago Pago Stakes | Rosehill | G2 | 1200 m | 55.5 | G. Boss | 1st – Genius And Evil |
| 4th | 03 Apr 2004 | Golden Slipper | Rosehill | G1 | 1200 m | 56.5 | G. Boss | 1st – Dance Hero |
| 3rd | 10 Apr 2004 | Sires Produce Stakes | Randwick | G1 | 1400 m | 56.5 | J. Cassidy | 1st – Dance Hero |

2004–05 season as a three-year-old
| Result | Date | Race | Venue | Group | Distance | Weight (kg) | Jockey | Winner/2nd |
|---|---|---|---|---|---|---|---|---|
| 2nd | 07 Aug 2004 | San Domenico Stakes | Randwick | G2 | 1000 m | 56.5 | G. Boss | 1st – Charge Forward |
| Won | 21 Aug 2004 | Up and Coming Stakes | Warwick Farm | G2 | 1200 m | 56 | G. Boss | 2nd – Dane Shadow |
| Won | 04 Sep 2004 | Roman Consul Stakes | Warwick Farm | G3 | 1200 m | 56.5 | G. Boss | 2nd – Charge Forward |
| 2nd | 19 Sep 2004 | Guineas Prelude | Caulfield | G3 | 1400 m | 57.5 | G. Boss | 1st – Tirade |
| 3rd | 02 Oct 2004 | Concept Sports Stakes | Flemington | LR | 1410 m | 57.5 | N. Rawiller | 1st – Classiconi |
| 8th | 09 Oct 2004 | Caulfield Guineas | Caulfield | G1 | 1600 m | 55.5 | G. Boss | 1st – Econsul |
| Won | 30 Oct 2004 | L'Oréal Plate | Flemington | G3 | 1200 m | 59 | G. Boss | 2nd – Brannigan |
| Won | 04 Nov 2004 | Lexus Classic | Flemington | G2 | 1200 m | 52.5 | G. Boss | 2nd – Super Impressive |
| Won | 05 Feb 2005 | Lightning Stakes | Flemington | G1 | 1000 m | 54.5 | G. Boss | 2nd – Alinghi |
| Won | 26 Feb 2005 | Oakleigh Plate | Caulfield | G1 | 1100 m | 57 | G. Boss | 2nd – Segments |
| 2nd | 12 Mar 2005 | Newmarket Handicap | Flemington | G1 | 1200 m | 57 | G. Boss | 1st – Alinghi |
| 2nd | 26 Mar 2005 | T J Smith Stakes | Randwick | G1 | 1200 m | 55 | G. Boss | 1st – Shamekha |

== Stud record ==
Fastnet Rock began his career at stud in 2005 standing at Coolmore Stud Australia in the Hunter Valley of New South Wales shuttled to Ireland 2010-21. In 2007 he covered 257 mares, second only behind Bel Esprit (266). In 2008 Fastnet Rock covered 248 mares at a fee of $82,500. In 2012 his fee was increased to $220,000 making him the most expensive stallion standing at stud in Australia. In 2013 Fastnet Rock's fee rose again to $275,000 which made him $100,000 dearer than the second most expensive stallion in Australia, Redoute's Choice. Fastnet Rock has sired 17 individual Group 1 winning horses including multiple Group 1 winners Mosheen, Sea Siren and Atlantic Jewel. Other notable Stakes winners include Smart Missile, Driefontein, Cluster, Bull Point, Albany Reunion and Hvasstan. It has 115th stakes winner as at 14 May 2017.

In 2024 Fastnet Rock was retired from stud duties.

Fastnet Rock's service fee:

| Year | Service fee (AUD) |
|---|---|
| 2005 | $55,000 |
| 2006 | $55,000 |
| 2007 | $55,000 |
| 2008 | $82,500 |
| 2009 | $60,500 |
| 2010 | $137,500 |
| 2011 | $132,000 |
| 2012 | $220,000 |
| 2013 | $275,000 |
| 2014 | Private |
| 2015 | Private |
| 2016 | Private |
| 2017 | Private |
| 2018 | Private |
| 2019 | $165,000 |
| 2020 | $165,000 |
| 2021 | $165,000 |
| 2022 | $165,000 |
| 2023 | $110,000 |

== Progeny ==
Fastnet Rock has currently sired 44 individual Group 1 winners:

=== Notable progeny ===
c = colt, f = filly, g = gelding

| Foaled | Name | Sex | Major wins |
| 2006 | Irish Lights | f | The Thousand Guineas |
| 2006 | Rock Classic | g | Australian Guineas |
| 2006 | Wanted | c | Newmarket Handicap |
| 2007 | Lone Rock | f | Goodwood Handicap |
| 2008 | Atlantic Jewel | f | The Thousand Guineas, All Aged Stakes, Memsie Stakes, Caulfield Stakes |
| 2008 | Foxwedge | c | William Reid Stakes |
| 2008 | Mosheen | f | VRC Oaks, Australian Guineas, Randwick Guineas, Vinery Stud Stakes |
| 2008 | Planet Rock | f | New Zealand 1000 Guineas |
| 2008 | Rock 'N' Pop | c | New Zealand 2000 Guineas |
| 2008 | Sea Siren | f | BTC Cup, Doomben 10,000, Manikato Stakes |
| 2009 | Albany Reunion | g | Easter Handicap |
| 2009 | Driefontein | f | Robert Sangster Stakes |
| 2009 | Nechita | f | Coolmore Stud Stakes |
| 2009 | Super Cool | g | Australian Cup |
| 2009 | Your Song | c | BTC Cup |
| 2010 | Atlante | c | New Zealand 2000 Guineas |
| 2011 | Amicus | f | The Thousand Guineas |
| 2011 | Awesome Rock | c | Emirates Stakes |
| 2011 | Fascinating Rock | c | Champion Stakes, Tattersalls Gold Cup |
| 2011 | First Seal | f | Flight Stakes |
| 2011 | Magicool | g | Queensland Derby |
| 2012 | Diamondsandrubies | f | Pretty Polly Stakes |
| 2012 | Dreamforce | g | George Ryder Stakes |
| 2012 | Laganore | f | Premio Lydia Tesio |
| 2012 | Qualify | f | Epsom Oaks |
| 2012 | Zhukova | f | Man o' War Stakes |
| 2013 | Comin' Through | g | Doomben Cup |
| 2013 | Heroic Valour | c | Diamond Stakes (NZ) |
| 2014 | Age Of Fire | c | Levin Classic |
| 2014 | Catchy | f | Blue Diamond Stakes |
| 2014 | Intricately | f | Moyglare Stud Stakes |
| 2014 | Merchant Navy | c | Coolmore Stud Stakes, Diamond Jubilee Stakes |
| 2014 | One Master | f | Prix de la Forêt (three times) |
| 2014 | Rivet | g | Racing Post Trophy |
| 2014 | Shoals | f | Myer Classic, Surround Stakes, Robert Sangster Stakes |
| 2014 | Unforgotten | f | Australian Oaks |
| 2015 | Avantage | f | Manawatu Sires Produce Stakes, Telegraph Handicap (twice), Haunui Farm Classic (twice), Bonecrusher New Zealand Stakes, Railway Stakes, BCD Group Sprint, New Zealand Thoroughbred Breeders Stakes |
| 2016 | Prince Fawaz | c | The J. J. Atkins |
| 2016 | Sherwood Forest | g | New Zealand Derby |
| 2017 | Personal | f | VRC Oaks |
| 2017 | Rocket Spade | c | New Zealand Derby |
| 2018 | Via Sistina | f | Pretty Polly Stakes, Ranvet Stakes (twice), Winx Stakes (twice), Turnbull Stakes, Cox Plate (twice), Champions Stakes (twice), Queen Elizabeth Stakes |
| 2019 | Buckaroo | g | Underwood Stakes |
| 2019 | Pizza Bianca | f | Breeders' Cup Juvenile Fillies Turf |

== Pedigree ==
Pedigree of Fastnet Rock (AUS)
| Sire Danehill (US) 1986 | Danzig (US); 1977 | Northern Dancer (Can); 1961 | Nearctic (Can) |
| Sire Danehill (US) 1986 | Danzig (US); 1977 | Northern Dancer (Can); 1961 | Natalma (US) |
| Sire Danehill (US) 1986 | Danzig (US); 1977 | Pas de Nom (US); 1968 | Admiral's Voyage (US) |
| Sire Danehill (US) 1986 | Danzig (US); 1977 | Pas de Nom (US); 1968 | Petitioner (GB) |
| Sire Danehill (US) 1986 | Razyana (US); 1981 | His Majesty (US); 1968 | Ribot (GB) |
| Sire Danehill (US) 1986 | Razyana (US); 1981 | His Majesty (US); 1968 | Flower Bowl (US) |
| Sire Danehill (US) 1986 | Razyana (US); 1981 | Spring Adieu (Can); 1974 | Buckpasser (US) |
| Sire Danehill (US) 1986 | Razyana (US); 1981 | Spring Adieu (Can); 1974 | Natalma (US) |
| Dam Piccadilly Circus (Aus) 1995 | Royal Academy (US); 1987 | Nijinsky (Can); 1967 | Northern Dancer (Can) |
| Dam Piccadilly Circus (Aus) 1995 | Royal Academy (US); 1987 | Nijinsky (Can); 1967 | Flaming Page (Can) |
| Dam Piccadilly Circus (Aus) 1995 | Royal Academy (US); 1987 | Crimson Saint (US); 1969 | Crimson Satan (US) |
| Dam Piccadilly Circus (Aus) 1995 | Royal Academy (US); 1987 | Crimson Saint (US); 1969 | Bolero Rose (US) |
| Dam Piccadilly Circus (Aus) 1995 | Gatana (Aus); 1989 | Marauding (NZ); 1984 | Sir Tristram (Ire) |
| Dam Piccadilly Circus (Aus) 1995 | Gatana (Aus); 1989 | Marauding (NZ); 1984 | Biscalowe (Aus) |
| Dam Piccadilly Circus (Aus) 1995 | Gatana (Aus); 1989 | Twigalae (Aus); 1979 | Twig Moss (Fr) |
| Dam Piccadilly Circus (Aus) 1995 | Gatana (Aus); 1989 | Twigalae (Aus); 1979 | Hondalae (NZ) |

- Fastnet Rock is inbred 3 × 4 to Northern Dancer

== See also ==
- Leading sire in Australia
