= HDF McNeil Stakes =

- Class: Group 3
- Location: Caulfield Racecourse, Melbourne, Australia
- Inaugurated: 1989
- Race type: Thoroughbred
- Sponsor: ive > (2024-2026)

Race information
- Distance: 1,200 metres
- Surface: Turf
- Track: Left-handed
- Qualification: Three-year-olds
- Weight: Set weights with penalties
- Purse: $200,000 (2026)

The HDF McNeil Stakes is a Melbourne Racing Club Group 3 Thoroughbred horse race for three-year-olds, at set weights with penalties, over a distance of 1200 metres at Caulfield Racecourse, Melbourne, Australia in late August or early September.

== History ==
=== Name ===
- 1989–1994 - HDF McNeil Quality

=== Distance ===
- 1989–2005 – 1100 metres
- 2006 onwards - 1200 metres

=== Grade ===
- prior 1991 - Handicap (unlisted)
- 1991–1998 - Listed race
- 1999 onwards - Group 3

== Winners ==
Winners of the race are as follows.

- 2026 - American Eagle
- 2025 - Tycoon Star
- 2024 - Growing Empire
- 2023 - Veight
- 2022 - Jacquinot
- 2021 - Bruckner
- 2020 - Immortal Love
- 2019 - Super Seth
- 2018 - Native Soldier
- 2017 - Merchant Navy
- 2016 - Defcon
- 2015 - Gold Symphony
- 2014 - Chivalry
- 2013 - Fast 'N' Rocking
- 2012 - Lady Of Harrods
- 2011 - Golden Archer
- 2010 - Sistine Angel
- 2009 - Starspangledbanner
- 2008 - Sugar Babe
- 2007 - Scenic Blast
- 2006 - Miss Finland
- 2005 - Danerich
- 2004 - Tahni Girl
- 2003 - Cahuita
- 2002 - Bel Esprit
- 2001 - Tully Dane
- 2000 - Rapid Man
- 1999 - Honour The Name
- 1998 - Theatre
- 1997 - La Baraka
- 1996 - Valourina
- 1995 - Gold Ace
- 1994 - Danzero
- 1993 - Sequalo
- 1992 - Snippet's Girl
- 1991 - Tierce
- 1990 - Manitor
- 1989 - Good Old Ted

== See also ==
- Memsie Stakes
- The Heath 1100
- Courtza Stakes
- List of Australian Group races
- Group races
