= Danny Nikolic =

Danny Nikolic (born 19 November 1974), is a jockey of Macedonian descent in Australian Thoroughbred horse racing.

On 15 May 2010, following a five-month investigation, Racing Victoria stewards laid nine charges against Danny Nikolic which included the serious allegations of improper practices and conduct prejudicial to the image of racing.

The Racing Appeals and Disciplinary Board, on 29 May 2010, cleared Nikolic of the charges of improper practices and conduct prejudicial to the image of racing, but fined him a total of $3,000 on five lesser charges to which he had pleaded guilty.

His wins have included:

- Blue Diamond Stakes on Paint (1996)
- Caulfield Cup on Mummify (2003)
- Caulfield Guineas on Starspangledbanner (2009)
- Caulfield Stakes (2004)
- Crown Oaks on Mosheen (2011)
- Oakleigh Plate on Starspangledbanner (2010)
- Queen Mother Memorial Cup, Sha Tin on Ever bright (2007)
- Randwick Guineas on Metal Bender (2009) and Mosheen (2012)
- Rosehill Guineas (2009)
- Singapore Airlines International Cup at Kranji on Mummify (2005)
- Sires' Produce Stakes (VRC) on My Duke (1996)
- Turnbull Stakes (2006)
