= Paul Perry (horse trainer) =

Australian horse trainer

Personal information
- Born: 15 July 1949 Newcastle, New South Wales
- Occupation: Horse trainer

Horse racing career
- Sport: Horse racing
- Career wins: Over 3,000

Major racing wins
- Epsom Handicap (1994); Salinger Stakes (1997); Emirates Stakes (1998); Oakleigh Plate (1999, 2005); Lightning Stakes (2003, 2005); Golden Jubilee Stakes (2003); King's Stand Stakes (2003); Golden Slipper (2005)

Significant horses
- Choisir; Fastnet Rock

Paul Perry is an Australian racehorse trainer based at Broadmeadow Racecourse. He is famous for winning the King's Stand Stakes and the Group One Golden Jubilee Stakes in the United Kingdom with Choisir. He has trained over 3,000 race winning horses since 1973.
