= Curragh Stakes =

Flat horse race in Ireland

- Class: Listed
- Location: Curragh Racecourse; County Kildare, Ireland
- Race type: Flat / Thoroughbred
- Sponsor: Qatar Racing and Equestrian Club
- Website: Curragh

Race information
- Distance: 5f (1,006 metres)
- Surface: Turf
- Track: Straight
- Qualification: Two-year-olds
- Weight: 9 st 3 lb Allowances; 5 lb for fillies Penalties; 7 lb for G1 / G2 winners 5 lb for G3 winners
- Purse: €35,250 (2022); 1st: €22,125

Curragh Stakes
2026
Armor Supreme	Grayrobin	New Bond Street

Previous years
2025
Ipanema Queen	Kansas	Namiid
2024
Treasure Isle	Saratoga Special	Lunigiana
2023
Asean	Alabama	Rush Queen
2022
Mauiewowie	Treasure Trove	Funny Money Honey
2021
Head Mistress	Loveday	Orinoco River

2020-2011
2020
Frenetic	Chief Little Hawk	Blue Cabochon
2019
Millisle	Isabeau	Lil Grey
2018
Indigo Balance	Gossamer Wings	Fantasy
2017
Treasuring	Goodthingstaketime	Sirici
2016
Hit The Bid	Mur Hiba	Yulong Baobei
2015
Bear Cheek	Independence Day	Blood Moon
2014
Ainippe	The Great War	Simply A Star
2013
Come To Heel	Hurryupharriet	Boom The Groom
2012
Three Sea Captains	Boston Rocker	Leitir Mor
2011
An Ghalanta	Boris Grigoriev	Bible Black

2010-2008
2010
Meow	Ladie's Choice	Moonlit Garden
2009
Arctic	Sole Power	Velvet Flicker
2008
Pasar Silbano	Call Me Alice	Silver Shoon

The Curragh Stakes is a Listed flat horse race in Ireland open to two-year-old thoroughbreds. It is run at the Curragh over a distance of 5 furlongs (1,006 metres), and it is scheduled to take place each year in August.

== History ==
The event was first run in 1932, run as The Curragh Foal Plate until 1956 and The Curragh Foal Stakes in 1957 and 1958. It was classed at Group 3 level in 1971. For a period it was usually staged in July. It was discontinued after 1996.

The Curragh Stakes was revived in 2008, and from this point it held Listed status. It became known as the Grangecon Stud Stakes in 2009. It was switched to August in 2010, and reverted to its former title in 2011. The race was upgraded to Group 3 in 2015 and downgraded back to Listed status in 2018.

== Records ==
Leading jockey since 1985 (6 wins):

- Colin Keane - Ainippe (2014), Bear Cheek (2015), Treasuring (2017), Frenetic (2020), Head Mistress (2021), Mauiewowie (2022)

Leading trainer since 1985 (8 wins):

- Ger Lyons - Pasar Silbano (2008), Ainippe (2014), Bear Cheek (2015), Treasuring (2017), Frenetic (2020), Head Mistress (2021), Mauiewowie (2022)

== Winners since 1985 ==
Year	Winner	Jockey	Trainer	Time
1985	Bermuda Classic	Willie Carson	Paddy Mullins
1986	Dominion Royale	Ray Cochrane	Robert Williams
1987	Peace Girl	Pat Eddery	John McLoughlin
1988	Heather Seeker	Stephen Craine	Liam Browne	1:00.80
1989	Aminata	Christy Roche	Jim Bolger	0:58.40
1990	Malvernico	Christy Roche	Jim Bolger	1:00.40
1991	Leading Time	Christy Roche	Jim Bolger	0:58.20
1992	Tropical	Michael Kinane	Dermot Weld	1:00.80
1993	Eichtercua	John Egan	K. O'Sullivan	1:00.70
1994	Millstream	Frankie Dettori	Mark Johnston	1:04.40
1995	Almaty	Pat Gilson	Con Collins	1:01.80
1996	Raphane	Kevin Darley	Con Collins	0:58.70
	no race 1997–2007
2008	Pasar Silbano	Keagan Latham	Ger Lyons	1:00.84
2009	Arctic	Pat Shanahan	Tracey Collins	1:05.09
2010	Meow	Johnny Murtagh	David Wachman	0:58.36
2011	An Ghalanta	Kevin Manning	Jim Bolger	1:00.20
2012	Three Sea Captains	Wayne Lordan	David Wachman	1:04.07
2013	Come to Heel	Wayne Lordan	David Wachman	0:58.87
2014	Ainippe	Colin Keane	Ger Lyons	0:58.49
2015	Bear Cheek	Colin Keane	Ger Lyons	0:59.96
2016	Hit The Bid	Leigh Roche	Darren Bunyan	1:00.04
2017	Treasuring	Colin Keane	Ger Lyons	1:02.35
2018	Indigo Balance	Colm O'Donoghue	Jessica Harrington	0:59.64
2019	Millisle	Shane Foley	Jessica Harrington	1:01.20
2020	Frenetic	Colin Keane	Ger Lyons	1:00.47
2021	Head Mistress	Colin Keane	Ger Lyons	0:59.62
2022	Mauiewowie	Colin Keane	Ger Lyons	1:00.48
2023	Asean	Gavin Ryan	Donnacha O'Brien	1:00.77
2024	Treasure Isle	Ryan Moore	Aidan O'Brien	0:57.85
2025	Ipanema Queen	Dylan Browne McMonagle	Adrian Murray	0:58.36
2026	Armour Supreme	Rossa Ryan	Diego Dias	0:59.04

== Earlier winners ==
- 1932: Smart Alec
- 1933: Moonstone
- 1934: Blanco
- 1935: Solo Whist
- 1936: Appointment
- 1937: My Jewel
- 1938: Red Ruffian
- 1939: Poker Chip
- 1940: Dunserverick
- 1941: King Kling
- 1942: The Phoenix
- 1943: Upper Set
- 1944: Mafosta
- 1945: Campaigner
- 1946: Precious Rose
- 1947: Morning Wings
- 1948: Ballywillwill
- 1949: Mighty Ocean
- 1950: Sheilas Cabin
- 1951: Stella Aurata
- 1952: Banri Calma
- 1953: Gorm Anna
- 1954: Trouville
- 1955: Bellette
- 1956: Silken Glider
- 1957: Golden Game
- 1958: His Legend
- 1959: Hobson
- 1960: Dorney Common
- 1961: Golden Sovereign
- 1962: Majority Rule
- 1963: Blue Marine
- 1964: Adriatic Star
- 1965: Lady Matador
- 1966: Jadeite
- 1967: Sorrentina
- 1968: Soho Lad
- 1969: Cinerama Two
- 1970: Supernatural
- 1971: Mirraglo *
- 1972: Chamozzle
- 1973: Noble Mark
- 1974: Mini Gift
- 1975: National Wish
- 1976: Nebbiolo
- 1977: Perla
- 1978: Phil's Fancy
- 1979: Jay Bird
- 1980: Crimson Heather
- 1981: Peterhof
- 1982: Virginia Deer
- 1983: Safe Home
- 1984: Zaius

* Wind Drift finished first in 1971, but he was disqualified for carrying an incorrect weight.

== See also ==
- Horse racing in Ireland
- List of Irish flat horse races
