= Ta Rib =

American-bred Thoroughbred racehorse

- Sire: Mr. Prospector
- Grandsire: Raise a Native
- Dam: Madame Secretary
- Damsire: Secretariat
- Sex: Mare
- Foaled: 23 April 1993
- Country: United States
- Colour: Chestnut
- Breeder: Shadwell Farm
- Owner: Hamdan Al Maktoum
- Trainer: Ed Dunlop
- Record: 7: 2-2-1
- Earnings: £164,427

Major wins
- Poule d'Essai des Pouliches (1996)

Ta Rib (foaled 23 April 1993 – after 2008) was an American-bred, British-trained Thoroughbred racehorse and broodmare. Despite failing to win as a juvenile in 1995 she showed promise as he was placed in both her races. In the following spring she won a maiden race and then recorded her biggest success when recording an upset victory in the Poule d'Essai des Pouliches. She failed to win again but ran well in defeat in three subsequent races. As a broodmare she produced several minor winners but no top-class performers.

== Background ==
Ta Rib was a chestnut mare with a small white star bred in Kentucky by Shadwell Farms, the breeding operation of her owner Hamdan Al Maktoum. The filly was sent to race in England and entered training with Ed Dunlop at the Gainsborough Stables in Newmarket, Suffolk.

She was sired by the hugely influential American stallion Mr. Prospector. Although he was best known for his success in the United States, Mr. Prospector was also the sire of numerous major winners in Europe including Kingmambo, Machiavellian, Lycius, Distant View and Ravinella. Ta Rib's dam Madame Secretary won two races and was a half-sister to two horses with very different aptitudes, namely Green Ruby, a sprinter who won the Stewards' Cup and Zero Watt, an out-and-out stayer who won the Ascot Stakes. She was a descendant of the American broodmare Dust Whirl (foaled 1928), making her a distant relative of Whirlaway and Conquistador Cielo.

== Racing career ==
=== 1995: two-year-old season ===
On her racecourse debut, Ta Rib started at odds of 12/1 in an eighteen-runner maiden race over seven furlongs at Newmarket Racecourse on 25 August and stayed on strongly to finish second, beaten a length by Hamdan Al Maktoum's other runner Ruznama. A month later at Ascot Racecourse she started the 3/1 second favourite for a minor event and ran third behind Story Line and Double Leaf. In this race she was ridden by Willie Carson, who partnered her in all her subsequent starts.

=== 1996: three-year-old season ===
Ta Rib began her second season in a maiden over seven furlongs at Newmarket on 3 May in which she started at odds of 11/4 and recorded her first victory as she won by five lengths from the favourite Fatefully after taking the lead three furlongs out. Nine days after her win at Newmarket the filly was sent to France and stepped up in class and distance for the Group 1 Poule d'Essai des Pouliches over 1600 metres at Longchamp Racecourse. She started at 14.1/1 in a nine-runner field headed by Shake The Yoke, with the other runners being True Flare (Prix de Pont Neuf), A Votre Sante (Prix La Camrgo), Housa Dancer (Prix Finlande) and Shawanni (fifth in the 1000 Guineas). Ta Rib raced close behind the leaders and turned into the straight in second place behind Shawanni. She went to the front 300 metres from the finish and kept on well under pressure to win by three quarters of a length from Shake The Yoke with the Irish-trained outsider Sagar Pride taking third. Ed Dunlop, who was winning a classic race at his first attempt said "I must pay credit to Ta Rib's owner, Sheikh Hamdan. He made the decision to come here today and he's been proved right again. Willie Carson rode a brilliant race".

At Royal Ascot on 19 June Ta Rib started second favourite for the Coronation Stakes but after racing in second for most of the way she faded in the closing stages and came home fourth behind Shake The Yoke, Last Second and Dance Design. In the Falmouth Stakes she finished second of the nine runners, beaten one and three quarter lengths by the French-trained filly Sensation. Ta Rib was matched against male opposition at Newbury Racecourse on 16 August in the seven furlong Hungerford Stakes, a race in which she carried an eight-pound weight penalty for her Group 1 success, and finished fourth behind the four-year-old colt Bin Rosie.

== Breeding record ==
At the end of her racing career, Ta Rib was retired to become a broodmare for Shadwell. She produced at least seven foals and five winners between 1998 and 2008:

- Kabeer, a chestnut colt (later gelded), foaled in 1998, sired by Unfuwain. Won six races.
- Mawaheb, chestnut filly, 1999, by Nashwan. Won one race.
- Khaizarana, bay filly, 2000, by Alhaarth. Won one race.
- Estihlal, bay filly, 2001, by Green Desert. Won two races.
- Fajr, bay colt (gelded), 2002, by Green Desert. Won eight races.
- Ghallab, bay colt, 2003, by Alhaarth. Failed to win in eight races.
- Eraadaat, chestnut mare, 2008, by Intikhab. Failed to win in one race.

== Pedigree ==
Pedigree of Ta Rib (USA), chestnut mare, 1993
Sire Mr. Prospector (USA) 1970	Raise a Native (USA); 1961	Native Dancer	Polynesian
Sire Mr. Prospector (USA) 1970	Raise a Native (USA); 1961	Native Dancer	Geisha
Sire Mr. Prospector (USA) 1970	Raise a Native (USA); 1961	Raise You	Case Ace
Sire Mr. Prospector (USA) 1970	Raise a Native (USA); 1961	Raise You	Lady Glory
Sire Mr. Prospector (USA) 1970	Gold Digger (USA); 1962	Nashua	Nasrullah
Sire Mr. Prospector (USA) 1970	Gold Digger (USA); 1962	Nashua	Segula
Sire Mr. Prospector (USA) 1970	Gold Digger (USA); 1962	Sequence	Count Fleet
Sire Mr. Prospector (USA) 1970	Gold Digger (USA); 1962	Sequence	Miss Dogwood
Dam Madame Secretary (USA) 1982	Secretariat (USA); 1970	Bold Ruler	Nasrullah
Dam Madame Secretary (USA) 1982	Secretariat (USA); 1970	Bold Ruler	Miss Disco
Dam Madame Secretary (USA) 1982	Secretariat (USA); 1970	Somethingroyal	Princequillo
Dam Madame Secretary (USA) 1982	Secretariat (USA); 1970	Somethingroyal	Imperatrice
Dam Madame Secretary (USA) 1982	Ruby Tuesday (USA); 1974	T.V. Lark	Indian Hemp
Dam Madame Secretary (USA) 1982	Ruby Tuesday (USA); 1974	T.V. Lark	Miss Larksfly
Dam Madame Secretary (USA) 1982	Ruby Tuesday (USA); 1974	Thoroly Blue	Blue Prince
Dam Madame Secretary (USA) 1982	Ruby Tuesday (USA); 1974	Thoroly Blue	Ambwithor (Family: 8-h)

- Ta Rib was inbred 4 × 4 to Nasrullah, meaning that this stallion appears twice in the fourth generation of his pedigree.
