= Fascinating Rock =

Irish-bred Thoroughbred racehorse

- Racing silks of Newtown Anner Stud
- Sire: Fastnet Rock
- Grandsire: Danehill
- Dam: Miss Polaris
- Damsire: Polar Falcon
- Sex: Colt
- Foaled: 28 March 2011
- Country: Ireland
- Colour: Bay
- Breeder: Newtown Anner Stud
- Owner: Newtown Anner Stud
- Trainer: Dermot Weld
- Record: 14: 8-1-1
- Earnings: £1,143,488

Major wins
- Ballysax Stakes (2014); Derrinstown Stud Derby Trial (2014); Heritage Stakes (2015); Mooresbridge Stakes (2015); Enterprise Stakes (2015); Champion Stakes (2015); Tattersalls Gold Cup (2016)

Fascinating Rock (foaled 28 March 2011) is an Irish Thoroughbred racehorse. After finishing unplaced on his only appearance as a juvenile he emerged as a high-class middle distance colt in the spring of 2014 with wins in the Ballysax Stakes and the Derrinstown Stud Derby Trial but was well-beaten in both The Derby and the Irish Derby. In 2015 he won the Mooresbridge Stakes and the Enterprise Stakes before recording his biggest win in the Champion Stakes. In 2016 he won the Tattersalls Gold Cup.

== Background ==
Fascinating Rock is a bay horse with two white socks bred by his owners, the Newton Anner Stud. He was sired by the Australian stallion Fastnet Rock who sired many leading horses including Foxwedge and Atlantic Jewel in the Southern hemisphere before moving to the Coolmore Stud in Ireland. Fascinating Rock's dam Miss Polaris won two minor races and is also the dam of the Galway Hurdle winner Quick Jack. Miss Polaris was descended from Chief Singer's half-sister Querida whose other descendants have included Epiphaneia.

The colt was sent into training with Dermot Weld and has been ridden in all of his races by Pat Smullen.

== Racing career ==
=== 2013: two-year-old season ===
Fascinating Rock made his racecourse debut in a maiden race over one mile on very soft ground at Leopardstown Racecourse on 26 October. He finished fifth of the ten runners, ten and a half lengths behind the winner Adelaide.

=== 2014: three-year-old season ===
On his three-year-old debut, Fascinating Rock started at odds of 9/1 in an eight-runner maiden over ten furlongs at Leopardstown on 30 March and won by a length from the Aidan O'Brien-trained Adjusted. At Navan Racecourse two weeks later the colt was moved up in class for the Group Three Ballysax Stakes and started 5/2 second favourite behind the Jim Bolger-trained Answered. He produced a strong run on the outside in the straight to take the lead a furlong out and won by two and a half lengths from Answered. The colt's next race was the Derrinstown Stud Derby Trial over ten furlongs at Leopardstown on 11 May, for which he started favourite against five opponents headed by the Beresford Stakes winner Geoffrey Chaucer. After being held up at the rear of the six runner field he finished strongly but failed by a head to overhaul the John Oxx-trained Ebanoran. He had been bumped by the "winner" in the closing stages and after a stewards' enquiry the placings of the first two finishers were reversed and the race awarded to Fascinating Rock.

On 7 June, Fascinating Rock was sent to England to run in The Derby and started at odds of 12/1 in a field of sixteen runners. After being badly hampered approaching the straight he never looked likely to mount a challenge and finished eighth, more than eleven lengths behind the winner Australia. Fascinating Rock faced Australia again in the Irish Derby at the Curragh Racecourse three weeks later but made no impact and finished last of the five runners.

=== 2015: four-year-old season ===
Fascinating Rock began his third season in the Listed Heritage Stakes over one mile at Leopardstown on 15 April. Starting the odds-on favourite on his first start for almost nine months, he recovered from a poor start to win by one and three quarter lengths from the five-year-old mare Alive Alive Oh. On 4 May the colt started 2/5 favourite for the Group Three Mooresbridge Stakes at the Curragh against three opponents headed by the 2011 Dewhurst Stakes winner Parish Hall. He raced in second before taking the lead approaching the final furlong and won by one and three quarter lengths from Parish Hall. In a strongly-contested Tattersalls Gold Cup at the same course three weeks later he was beaten a neck by Al Kazeem, with Postponed third, The Grey Gatsby fourth and Parish Hall fifth.

After a three-month break, Fascinating Rock returned for the Winter Hill Stakes at Windsor Racecourse in England on 29 August. He started the 6/5 favourite but finished fifth of the eight runners behind the Godolphin three-year-old Racing History. In the Enterprise Stakes over one and a half miles at Leopardstown on 12 September the colt started second favourite behind Answered in a field which also included the one time Derby favourite John F Kennedy. After racing in third place, he took the lead in the last quarter mile and drew away from his rivals to win by six lengths from the gelding Panama Hat.

On 17 October Fascinating Rock was sent to England for the third time and started at odds of 10/1 for the Group One Champion Stakes over ten furlongs at Ascot Racecourse. The Irish Derby winner Jack Hobbs started favourite ahead of Found, whilst the other runners included Vadamos (Prix Niel, Oettingen-Rennen), The Corsican (Arc Trial), Ribbons (Prix Jean Romanet), Racing History, Sumbal (Prix Greffulhe), Air Pilot (International Stakes) and Tullius (Sandown Mile, York Stakes). Smullen restrained the colt towards the middle of the thirteen runner field as the pacemaker Maverick Wave made the running from Jack Hobbs. He began to make progress in the straight, overtook Jack Hobbs inside the final furlong and held off the late challenge of Found to win by one and a quarter lengths. Jack Hobbs finished third ahead of Racing History and Air Pilot. After the race, Weld said "He likes this ground and I've thought this race would suit him for a while. I was very impressed with the way he won at Leopardstown and after that we stuck with the original plan, which was always today. The way he was ridden today was also always the plan, from off the pace. I had a fair idea they would go a pretty good gallop so I told Pat to take him time and hunt away as I knew the horse would come home for him. He'll be a better five-year-old as well."

=== 2016: five-year-old season ===
Fascinating Rock began his third season in the Mooresbridge Stakes at the Curragh on 2 May. He was made the 11/10 favourite, but was unable to quicken in the closing stages and finished third behind Found and Success Days. Three weeks later he faced Found and Success Days again as he made his second attempt to win the Tattersalls Gold Cup. Starting the 9/4 second favourite he tracked the leader Success Days before taking the lead two furlongs out. He drew away in the closing stages to win by three and three quarter lengths from Found.

== Stud career ==
Fascinating Rock was retired from racing at the end of 2016 and began his career as a breeding stallion in 2017 at the Ballylinch Stud.

== Pedigree ==
Pedigree of Fascinating Rock (IRE), bay colt, 2011
Sire Fastnet Rock (AUS) 2001	Danehill (USA); 1986	Danzig	Northern Dancer
Sire Fastnet Rock (AUS) 2001	Danehill (USA); 1986	Danzig	Pas de Nom
Sire Fastnet Rock (AUS) 2001	Danehill (USA); 1986	Razvana	His Majesty
Sire Fastnet Rock (AUS) 2001	Danehill (USA); 1986	Razvana	Spring Adieu
Sire Fastnet Rock (AUS) 2001	Piccadilly Circus (AUS); 1995	Royal Academy	Nijinsky
Sire Fastnet Rock (AUS) 2001	Piccadilly Circus (AUS); 1995	Royal Academy	Crimson Saint
Sire Fastnet Rock (AUS) 2001	Piccadilly Circus (AUS); 1995	Gatana	Marauding
Sire Fastnet Rock (AUS) 2001	Piccadilly Circus (AUS); 1995	Gatana	Twigalae
Dam Miss Polaris (GB) 2001	Polar Falcon (USA); 1987	Nureyev	Northern Dancer
Dam Miss Polaris (GB) 2001	Polar Falcon (USA); 1987	Nureyev	Special
Dam Miss Polaris (GB) 2001	Polar Falcon (USA); 1987	Marie d'Argonne	Jefferson
Dam Miss Polaris (GB) 2001	Polar Falcon (USA); 1987	Marie d'Argonne	Mohair
Dam Miss Polaris (GB) 2001	Sarabah (IRE); 1988	Ela-Mana-Mou	Pitcairn
Dam Miss Polaris (GB) 2001	Sarabah (IRE); 1988	Ela-Mana-Mou	Rose Bertin
Dam Miss Polaris (GB) 2001	Sarabah (IRE); 1988	Be Discreet	Junius
Dam Miss Polaris (GB) 2001	Sarabah (IRE); 1988	Be Discreet	Querida (Family 16-a)
