= Celebration Stakes =

Irish horse race

Celebration Stakes
2026
Zodiac Bear	Alcantor	Cowardofthecounty

Previous years
2025
Skukuza	Alakazi	Currawood
2024
Lord Massusus	Atlantic Coast	Azada
2023
Bold Discovery	Tarawa	Carrytheone
2022
Wexford Native	The Acropolis	Emphatic Answer
2021
Fourhometwo	Khartoum	State Of Rest

2020-2011
2020
Ancient Spirit	Bowerman	Could Be King
2019
Insignia Of Rank	Old Glory	Pincheck
2018
I'm So Fancy	Allegio	St Patrick's Day
2017
True Valour	Sea Wolf	Alexios Komnenos
2016
Sruthan	Sovereign Debt	Hint of A Tint
2015
Sovereign Debt	Flight Risk	Fastnet Mist
2014
Giovanni Boldini	Paene Magnus	Einsteins Folly
2013
Count Of Limonade	Scintillula	Captain Joy
2012
Sharestan	Mizani	Learn
2011
Pirateer	Ezalli	One Spirit

2010-2001
2010
Emperor Claudius	Gold Bubbles	Barring Decree
2009
Famous Name	Jumbajukiba	Indiana Gal
2008
Lisvale	Jumbajukiba	Capt Chaos
2007
Danehill Music	Hard Rock City	Cougar Bay
2006
Mustameet	Arch Rebel	Albertinelli
2005
Caradak	Kings Point	Merger
2004
Grand Passion	Solskjaer	Latino Magic
2003
Mingun	Hanabad	Plume Rouge
2002
Duck Row	Phariseek	Prize Time
2001
Bach	Maumee	Mastermind

2000-1995
2000
Citizen Edward	Larifaari	Willyever
1999
Union Project	Moiseyev	Power And Panache
1998
Royal House	Free To Speak	Miss Emer
1997
Via Verbano	Free To Speak	Slightly Speedy
1996
Peace Prize	Raiyoun	Try For Ever
1995
Kayaara	Caraiyma	Wood Leopard

The Celebration Stakes is a Listed flat horse race in Ireland open to thoroughbreds aged three years or older. It is run at the Curragh over a distance of 1 mile (1,609 metres), and it is scheduled to take place each year in late June or early July.

The race was first run in 1995. It was run as a seven furlong handicap in 2000, and was awarded Listed status in 2001. It is currently sponsored by Dubai Duty Free.

== Records ==
Leading jockey (4 wins):

- Kevin Manning – Via Verbano (1997), Union Project (1999), Citizen Edward (2000), Wexford Native (2022)

Leading trainer (6 wins):

- Aidan O'Brien – Bach (2001), Mingun (2003), Emperor Claudius (2010), Pirateer (2011), Count Of Limonade (2013), Giovanni Boldini (2014)

== Winners ==
Year	Winner	Age	Jockey	Trainer	Time
1995	Kayaara	3	Pat Shanahan	Noel Furlong	1:43.10
1996	Peace Prize	3	Michael Kinane	Dermot Weld	1:39.30
1997	Via Verbano	3	Kevin Manning	Jim Bolger	1:44.00
1998	Royal House	3	Johnny Murtagh	John Oxx	1:44.70
1999	Union Project	3	Kevin Manning	Jim Bolger	1:40.40
2000	Citizen Edward	3	Kevin Manning	Jim Bolger	1:28.30
2001	Bach	4	Michael Kinane	Aidan O'Brien	1:36.60
2002	Duck Row	7	Richard Hughes	James Toller	1:38.40
2003	Mingun	3	Michael Kinane	Aidan O'Brien	1:39.20
2004	Grand Passion	4	John Egan	Geoff Wragg	1:35.60
2005	Caradak	4	Fran Berry	John Oxx	1:35.80
2006	Mustameet	5	Declan McDonogh	Kevin Prendergast	1:36.20
2007	Danehill Music	4	D M Grant	David Wachman	1:43.93
2008	Lisvale	3	Wayne Lordan	David Wachman	1:36.95
2009	Famous Name	4	Pat Smullen	Dermot Weld	1:36.70
2010	Emperor Claudius	3	Johnny Murtagh	Aidan O'Brien	1:35.10
2011	Pirateer	3	Ryan Moore	Aidan O'Brien	1:38.70
2012	Sharestan	4	Johnny Murtagh	John Oxx	1:44.79
2013	Count Of Limonade	3	Joseph O'Brien	Aidan O'Brien	1:35.65
2014	Giovanni Boldini	3	Joseph O'Brien	Aidan O'Brien	1:38.74
2015	Sovereign Debt	6	Chris Hayes	David Nicholls	1:41.43
2016	Sruthan	6	Colm O'Donoghue	Paul Deegan	1:40.30
2017	True Valour	3	Shane Foley	Johnny Murtagh	1:38.21
2018	I'm So Fancy	4	Colm O'Donoghue	Jessica Harrington	1:40.32
2019	Insignia of Rank	4	Gary Carroll	Joseph Murphy	1:40.72
2020	Ancient Spirit	5	Shane Foley	Jessica Harrington	1:41.44
2021	Fourhometwo	3	Ben Coen	Johnny Murtagh	1:41.18
2022	Wexford Native	3	Kevin Manning	Jim Bolger	1:41.17
2023	Bold Discovery	3	Shane Foley	Jessica Harrington	1:36.34
2024	Lord Massusus	3	Gary Carroll	Joseph Murphy	1:38.48
2025	Skukuza	4	Ryan Moore	Ed Dunlop	1:37.15
2026	Zodiac Bear	4	Ben Coen	Johnny Murtagh	1:38:88

== See also ==
- Horse racing in Ireland
- List of Irish flat horse races
