= Starspangledbanner =

Australian-bred Thoroughbred racehorse

- Racing silks of Michael Tabor
- Sire: Choisir (AUS)
- Grandsire: Danehill Dancer (IRE)
- Dam: Gold Anthem
- Damsire: Made Of Gold (USA)
- Sex: Stallion
- Foaled: 10 September 2006
- Country: Australia
- Colour: Chestnut
- Breeder: Makybe Racing & Breeding Pty Ltd
- Owner: D Smith, M Tabor, Mrs Magnier, Ms Massey
- Trainer: Leon Corstens (AUS); Aidan O'Brien (IRE)
- Record: 23: 7-3-2
- Earnings: A$2,198,503

Major wins
- Vain Stakes (2009); HDF McNeil Stakes (2009); Caulfield Guineas (2009); Oakleigh Plate (2010); Golden Jubilee Stakes (2010); July Cup (2010)

Awards
- Australian Champion Sprinter (2009); European Champion Sprinter (2010)
- Last updated on 25 June 2015

Starspangledbanner is an Australian-bred and internationally raced Thoroughbred racehorse who won six of his sixteen group or listed race starts including the group one (G1) Golden Jubilee Stakes at Royal Ascot, G1 July Cup at Newmarket, G1 Oakleigh Plate and the G1 Caulfield Guineas for A$2,198,503 in prize money.

== Breeding and background ==
He was foaled on 10 September 2006, and bred by Tony Santic's Makybe Racing & Breeding Pty Ltd. Starspangledbanner is by international race winner and successful sire, Choisir, his dam is the race winner, Gold Anthem who has produced five named foals for two other winners, by different sires. He was line bred to Star Kingdom in the fifth and sixth generations (5m x 6f) of his pedigree.

Starspangledbanner was offered for sale at the Inglis Premier Yearling Sale where he was auctioned and sold for A$120,000 with the breeder electing to retain a share in the new ownership.

== Racing record ==
Starspangledbanner commenced racing in 2008. He won a total of five races from twelve starts in Australia and became the first group one winner for his sire Choisir.

In 2009 Starspangledbanner won his biggest race to date in the Caulfield Guineas. In that race he beat one of the strongest three-year -ld fields assembled in Australia in recent years, with the beaten runners including the subsequent Cox Plate quinella in So You Think and Manhattan Rain.

Starspangledbanner won the Oakleigh Plate at Caulfield in February 2010, the Golden Jubilee Stakes at Ascot in June 2010, and the July Cup at Newmarket in the following month. He failed to win at his next two starts and in November 2010 was retired from racing. Due to fertility issues, Starspangledbanner returned to training in late 2012. He finished second in the Renaissance Stakes run at the Curragh. He was retired from racing again in May 2013.

2008-09 season as a two-year-old
Result	Date	Race	Venue	Distance	Weight (kg)	Time	Jockey	Winner/2nd
Won	25/10/2008	Inglis Juvenile 2 Open	Moonee Valley	1,000m	55.5	0:59.04	Vlad Duric	No Comment 2nd
3rd	08/02/2009	Rowfield B/Diamond Prel.-C&G (G3) CG 2 Open	Caulfield	1,100m	55.5	1:04.69	Vlad Duric	Real Saga 1st
9th	21/2/2009	Blue Diamond Stakes (G1) 2 OPEN	Caulfield	1,200m	55.5	1:11.12	Vlad Duric	Reward For Effort 1st
2nd	14/3/2009	Festival of Racing Stakes (LR) 2 Open	Flemington	1,000m	57	0:58.20	Nick Ryan	Common Interest 1st

2009-10 season as a three-year-old
Result	Date	Race	Venue	Distance	Weight (kg)	Time	Jockey	Winner/2nd
Disq.	01/08/2009	VIC. Owners & Breeders Awards 3 open	Caulfield	1,000m	58.5	0:58.88	Damien Oliver	Tariks 1st
Won	15/08/2009	R S L Vain Stakes (LR) CG 3 Open	Caulfield	1,100m	56.5	1:04.10	Danny Nikolic	Eclair Fastpass 2nd
Won	29/08/2009	H.D.F. Mcneil Stakes (G3) 3 Open	Caulfield	1,200m	58	1:10.25	Danny Nikolic	Tollesprit 2nd
4th	19/09/2009	Caulfield Guineas Prel-3yo C&G (G3) CG 3 Open	Caulfield	1,400m	56.5	1:24.80	Danny Nikolic	Demerit 1st
Won	10/10/2009	Caulfield Guineas (G1) 3 Open	Caulfield	1,600m	55.5	1:35.69	Danny Nikolic	Carrara 2nd
4th	30/01/2010	Lightning Stakes (G1)	Flemington	1,000m	55.0	0:57.12	Danny Nikolic	Nicconi 1st
Won	20/02/2010	Oakleigh Plate (G1)	Caulfield	1,100m	52.0	1:03.16	Danny Nikolic	Arinos 2nd
3rd	06/03/2010	Newmarket Handicap (G1)	Flemington	1,200m	53.5	1:10.11	Danny Nikolic	Wanted 1st
5th	12/05/2010	Duke of York Stakes (G2)	York (UK)	6 fur.	62.5	1:11.19	Johnny Murtagh	Prime Defender 1st
Won	16/06/2010	Golden Jubilee Stakes (G1)	Ascot (UK)	6 fur.	59.5	1:12.57	Johnny Murtagh	Society Rock 2nd
Won	09/07/2010	July Cup (G1)	Newmarket (UK)	6 fur.	59.5	1:09.81	Johnny Murtagh	Equiano 2nd

2010 season as a four-year-old
Result	Date	Race	Venue	Distance	Weight (kg)	Time	Jockey	Winner/2nd
2nd	20/08/2010	Nunthorpe Stakes (G1)	York (UK)	5 fur.	62.5	0:57.13	Johnny Murtagh	Sole Power 1st
5th	04/09/2010	Haydock Sprint Cup (G1)	Haydock Park (UK)	6 fur.	58.5	1:09.40	C O'Donoghue	Markab 1st

== Stud record ==
Starspangledbanner was retired to Coolmore Stud in Ireland where his 2011 service fee has been set at €15,000. After his first season at stud, he was deemed to be sub fertile and sired only 63 foals after covering at least 160 mares. His sperm were abnormally formed and had reduced motility.

=== Notable progeny ===
c = colt, f = filly, g = gelding

Foaled	Name	Sex	Major wins
2012	The Wow Signal	c	Prix Morny
2017	Millisle	f	Cheveley Park Stakes
2018	State Of Rest	c	Saratoga Derby, W. S. Cox Plate, Prix Ganay, Prince of Wales's Stakes
2018	Arista	f	Prix Jean Romanet
2018	Beauty Eternal	g	Champions Mile
2018	California Spangle	g	Hong Kong Mile, Queen's Silver Jubilee Cup, Al Quoz Sprint
2019	Rhea Moon (IRE)	f	American Oaks
2021	Puchkine	c	Prix Jean Prat
2023	Gstaad	c	Breeders' Cup Juvenile Turf, Irish 2,000 Guineas
2023	Precise	f	Moyglare Stud Stakes, Fillies' Mile, Irish 1,000 Guineas, Coronation Stakes
2023	Kensington Lane	f	Belmont Oaks
2024	Senorita Bonita	f	Prix Morny

== Pedigree ==
Pedigree of Starspangledbanner (AUS) {22-b} chestnut 2006
Sire Choisir (AUS) 1999	Danehill Dancer (IRE); 1993	Danehill (USA)	Danzig (USA)
Sire Choisir (AUS) 1999	Danehill Dancer (IRE); 1993	Danehill (USA)	Razyana (USA)
Sire Choisir (AUS) 1999	Danehill Dancer (IRE); 1993	Mira Adonde (USA)	Sharpen Up (GB)
Sire Choisir (AUS) 1999	Danehill Dancer (IRE); 1993	Mira Adonde (USA)	Lettre D'Amour (USA)
Sire Choisir (AUS) 1999	Great Selection (AUS); 1990	Lunchtime (GB)	Silly Season (USA)
Sire Choisir (AUS) 1999	Great Selection (AUS); 1990	Lunchtime (GB)	Great Occasion (GB)
Sire Choisir (AUS) 1999	Great Selection (AUS); 1990	Pensive Mood (AUS)	Biscay (AUS)
Sire Choisir (AUS) 1999	Great Selection (AUS); 1990	Pensive Mood (AUS)	Staid (AUS)
Dam Gold Anthem (AUS) 1999	Made of Gold (USA); 1989	Green Forest (USA)	Shecky Greene (USA)
Dam Gold Anthem (AUS) 1999	Made of Gold (USA); 1989	Green Forest (USA)	Tell Meno Lies (USA)
Dam Gold Anthem (AUS) 1999	Made of Gold (USA); 1989	Vindaria (USA)	Roi Dagobert (FR)
Dam Gold Anthem (AUS) 1999	Made of Gold (USA); 1989	Vindaria (USA)	Heavenly Body (USA)
Dam Gold Anthem (AUS) 1999	National Song (AUS); 1992	Vain (AUS)	Wilkes (FR)
Dam Gold Anthem (AUS) 1999	National Song (AUS); 1992	Vain (AUS)	Elated (AUS)
Dam Gold Anthem (AUS) 1999	National Song (AUS); 1992	Olympic Aim (NZ)	Zamazaan (FR)
Dam Gold Anthem (AUS) 1999	National Song (AUS); 1992	Olympic Aim (NZ)	Gold Vink (NZ)

Unlike most racehorses, Starspangledbanner is not inbred within the 4th generation or even within the 5th generation to any horse.
