= Atlantic Jewel =

Australian-bred Thoroughbred racehorse

- Sire: Fastnet Rock (AUS)
- Grandsire: Danehill (USA)
- Dam: Regard (AUS)
- Damsire: Zabeel (NZ)
- Sex: Mare
- Foaled: 26 September 2008
- Died: 20 August 2020 (aged 11)
- Country: Australia
- Colour: Bay
- Breeder: GJ Perry
- Owner: Coolmore Stud L M Macri, M J Kirwan, M Texier, C Murphy, M V Magnier, D L O'byrne
- Trainer: Mark Kavanagh
- Record: 11: 10-1-0
- Earnings: A$1,587,925

Major wins
- The Thousand Guineas (2011); Wakeful Stakes (2011); Sapphire Stakes (2012); All Aged Stakes (2012); Memsie Stakes (2013); Stocks Stakes (2013); Caulfield Stakes (2013)
- Last updated on 16 October 2017

Atlantic Jewel (26 September 2008 – 20 August 2020) was an Australian Thoroughbred racehorse and broodmare. Sired by champion sire Fastnet Rock, and raced by Coolmore, Atlantic Jewel was trained by Melbourne's Mark Kavanagh. She won 10 of her 11 starts, including four Group One races. Her eighth start was the Memsie Stakes at Caulfield Racecourse, where she defeated eight rivals after a long injury break, and it confirmed her as Australia's best racehorse. She also won the 1000 Guineas at Caulfield Racecourse by three lengths, defeating four-time Group One winner Mosheen.

Atlantic Jewel foaled two winning racehorses, Pacific Ocean and Russian Emperor, with the latter being a Group 1 winner.

Atlantic Jewel died in August 2020 of a haemorrhage, after giving birth to a colt by Justify at Coolmore Stud in the Hunter Valley of New South Wales.

== Background ==
Purchased by Coolmore for $320,000 at the Gold Coast yearling sale, Atlantic Jewel is sired by Coolmore's champion sire Fastnet Rock and by the Zabeel mare Regard. Fastnet Rock himself was a great racehorse, winning the Lightning Stakes and Oakleigh Plate, winning over $1.7 million. As well as being a success in his racing, Fastnet Rock has sired many winners including Mosheen, Lone Rock, Wanted, Sea Siren, Foxwedge, and many others. Atlantic Jewels' dam Regard, was an un-raced mare by the Great Zabeel. Atlantic Jewel is her first foal to race. Her second was the group one filly Commanding Jewel by Commands, making her 3/4 sister to Atlantic Jewel. Commanding Jewel herself won the 1000 Guineas a year later, giving her dam Regard back-to-back wins in the 1000 Guineas.

== Racing career ==
=== 2011-2012: Three-year-old season ===
She made her racing début as a three-year-old at Geelong on 23 August 2011. Running over 1,100 metres (1,200 yd), with Stephen Baster, Atlantic Jewel won by 1.3 lengths. At her next start, she stepped up to Saturday class and won by just under a length with jockey Michael Rodd easing her up. After winning another race over 1,400 metres (1,500 yd) by 2.8 lengths, Atlantic Jewel stepped up to group one level. The 1000 Guineas over 1,600 metres saw her against multiple group one winner Mosheen, stakes winner Hallowell Belle, and others. Ridden by Michael Rodd, Atlantic Jewel won her first Group One by three lengths at a price of $1.70. She continued to the Wakeful Stakes, a lead up to the VRC Oaks. Starting at a price of $1.26 over 2,000 metres (2,200 yd), she won by seven lengths. Atlantic Jewel would have started a short-priced favourite in the Oaks, but injury ruled her out of the rest of the spring.

Atlantic Jewel returned from her injury in the autumn, running in two races. She made her first start in the group two Sapphire stakes. Ridden by her regular jockey, she won by 3.8 lengths, beating home group one Stradbroke winner Mid Summer Music. Atlantic Jewel's next start was her first test at weight for age. In the All Aged Stakes, she started $1.12 favourite and won by 1.3 lengths, beating home Rain Affair. Atlantic Jewel was to be sent for a spell and saved to race in the spring. However, she suffered a tendon injury which ruled out racing as a four-year-old.

=== 2013-2014: Five-year-old season ===
Atlantic Jewel's first start of her spring campaign as a five-year-old, and first start for 16 months, came in the Memsie Stakes on August 31, 2013. Despite the long layoff, and a high quality field featuring many of Australasia's best horses, she took her unbeaten run to eight wins with a dominant 2.3 length win without being fully extended. This performance made her a dominant favorite for the Cox Plate. A win against mares in the Stocks Stakes took her winning streak to nine. She then contested the Underwood Stakes against a high-quality field. In the race, she led most of the way; however, she suffered defeat for the first time as It's A Dundeel, the Sydney Triple Crown winner, sat outside her and beat her by a short half-head. The result saw her remain the Cox Plate favourite, albeit with It's A Dundeel close in the markets. Shortly before the Cox Plate after the barrier draw, she was found to have a swollen tendon in her right foreleg following a workout, and was scratched from the race.

=== Overall race record ===
Result	Date	Race	Venue	Group	Distance	Weight	Jockey	Time	2nd place/winner	Margin
Won	12 October 2013	Caulfield Stakes	Caulfield	Group 1	2000 m	57.0 kg	Michael Rodd	2-03.99	Foreteller	4 lengths
2nd	21 September 2013	Underwood Stakes	Caulfield	Group 1	1800 m	57.0 kg	Michael Rodd	1-54.70	Dundeel	0.1 lengths
Won	14 September 2013	Stock Stakes	Moonee Valley	Group 2	1600 m	57.0 kg	Michael Rodd	1-36.88	Oasis Bloom	2.5 lengths
Won	31 August 2013	Memsie Stakes	Caulfield	Group 1	1400 m	57.0 kg	Michael Rodd	1-24.43	Ferlax	2.3 lengths
Won	28 April 2012	All Aged Stakes	Randwick	Group 1	1400 m	54.5 kg	Michael Rodd	1-21.82	Rain Affair	1.3 lengths
Won	14 April 2012	Sapphire Stakes	Randwick	Group 2	1200 m	57.5 kg	Michael Rodd	1-8.96	Mid Summer Music	3.8 lengths
Won	29 October 2011	Wakeful Stakes	Flemington	Group 2	2000 m	54.0 kg	Michael Rodd	2-4.98	Rahveel	7 lengths
Won	12 October 2011	1000 Guineas	Caulfield	Group 1	1600 m	55.5 kg	Michael Rodd	1-35.86	Mosheen	3 lengths
Won	24 September 2011	3yo handicap	Caulfield	Handicap	1400 m	58.0 kg	Damien Oliver	1-23.11	Our Miss Jones	2.8 lengths
Won	10 September 2011	3yo Handicap	Moonee Valley	Handicap	1200 m	55.0 kg	Michael Rodd	1-11.66	Sharnee Rose	0.8 lengths
Won	23 August 2011	Maiden	Geelong	Maiden	1100 m	55.5 kg	Stephen Baster	1-5.33	Luxurious Choice	1.3 lengths

== Retirement and Career at Stud ==
Shortly following the announcement of her second tendon injury and her scratching from the Cox Plate, Atlantic Jewel's retirement was announced. She was transferred to Ireland for a broodmare career.

At stud, she had four foals that made it to race, the first and most successful being two-time Hong Kong Champion Stayer Russian Emperor.
