= Choisir =

Australian-bred Thoroughbred racehorse

- Racing silks of Choisir
- Sire: Danehill Dancer (IRE)
- Grandsire: Danehill (USA)
- Dam: Great Selection (AUS)
- Damsire: Lunchtime (GB)
- Sex: Stallion
- Foaled: 18 September 1999
- Died: 7 December 2021 (aged 22)
- Country: Australia
- Colour: Chestnut
- Breeder: R.M. Daisley, NSW
- Owner: Terry Wallace & Partners
- Trainer: Paul Perry
- Record: 23: 7-5-6
- Earnings: $2,258,545

Major wins
- 2003 Ascot Golden Jubilee Stakes; 2003 VRC Lightning Stakes; 2003 King's Stand Stakes

Awards
- 2001-02 Champion 2yo colt in Australia; 2003 Champion older sprinter in Europe

Honours
- Australian Racing Hall of Fame
- Last updated on 28 August 2011

Choisir (18 September 1999 – 7 December 2021) was an Australian-bred dual hemisphere-winning Thoroughbred racehorse. He became the first Australian-trained winner of the Group Two King's Stand Stakes. The same year, Choisir also won the Golden Jubilee Stakes and was second in the July Cup.

== Breeding ==
He was sired by the Group one (G1) winner Danehill Dancer (sire of over 500 individual starters for nine G1 winners); his dam Great Selection was by Lunchtime (GB). Choisir was a full brother to Danny Dancer, who won five races in Australia, and a half-brother to Supermarket (by Zephyr Zip ((NZ)), won eight races in Australia and dam of three winners) and Great Chic (by Prince of Birds ((USA)), dam of three winners).

== Racing career ==
Choisir was trained by Paul Perry who was based at Broadmeadow Racecourse.

=== At two years ===
At two Choisir won the Group 3 STC Skyline Stakes over 1,200 metres, the listed AJC Breeders' Plate over 1,000 m., Inglis 2 YO Classic (1,200 m.) and was second in the Group one (G1) AJC Sires Produce Stakes, G2 STC Pago Pago Stakes, 2 YO Conditions Handicap, along with third placings in the G1 STC Golden Slipper Stakes and AJC Champagne Stakes.

=== At three years ===
Choisir won the G1 VRC Lightning Stakes, Linlithgow Stakes, had third placings in the G1 MRC Oakleigh Plate, G1 2002 Caulfield Guineas, G2 AJC Stan Fox Stakes, G3 VRC L'Oreal Paris Plate.

=== At four years ===
At four Choisir won the G1 Royal Ascot Golden Jubilee Stakes (6 f.) and the G2 King's Stand Stakes (5 f.) as well as placing second in the G1 Newmarket July Cup.

When Choisir's career was over, Perry hoped that Fastnet Rock would repeat Choisir's successful English campaign, however Fastnet Rock suffered from travel sickness and was unable to race in the United Kingdom.

== Stud record ==
Coolmore Stud Australia purchased Choisir to begin a new career as a shuttle stallion just two days after Choisir had finished second in the July Cup.

Choisir was standing at a service fee of $29,700 at Coolmore Stud in 2019. He was pensioned from the breeding barn at the end of the 2020 breeding season.

Choisir died at Coolmore Stud on 7 December 2021.

=== Notable stock ===
Choisir sired 12 individual Group 1 winners.

c = colt, f = filly, g = gelding

Foaled	Name	Sex	Major wins
2005	Sacred Choice	f	Myer Classic, Doncaster Handicap
2006	Starspangledbanner	c	Caulfield Guineas, Oakleigh Plate, Golden Jubilee Stakes, July Cup
2007	Historian	g	Zabeel Classic, Thorndon Mile
2008	Obviously	g	Shoemaker Mile Stakes, Breeders' Cup Turf Sprint
2009	Choice Bro	g	Manawatu Sires Produce Stakes
2010	Kushadasi	g	South Australian Derby
2010	Olympic Glory	c	Prix Jean-Luc Lagardère, Queen Elizabeth II Stakes, Lockinge Stakes, Prix de la Forêt
2012	Japonisme	g	Coolmore Stud Stakes
2013	Divine Prophet	c	Caulfield Guineas
2014	The Last Lion	c	Middle Park Stakes
2014	The Mission	c	Champagne Stakes
2016	Snapdancer	f	Robert Sangster Stakes, Memsie Stakes

Choisir also sired Proisir, a Group 3 winner who went on to become a leading stud stallion in New Zealand.

Choisir was the grandsire of:

- Levante, winner of the Telegraph Handicap (2022 & 2023)
- Legarto, winner of 3 Group 1 races
