= Bijou d'Inde =

British-bred Thoroughbred racehorse

- Sire: Cadeaux Genereux
- Grandsire: Young Generation
- Dam: Pushkar
- Damsire: Northfields
- Sex: Stallion
- Foaled: 9 March 1993
- Country: United Kingdom
- Colour: Chestnut
- Breeder: Whitsbury Manor Stud
- Owner: Stuart Morrison
- Trainer: Mark Johnston
- Record: 17: 3-2-2
- Earnings: £281,902

Major wins
- Acomb Stakes (1995); Futurity Stakes (1995); St James's Palace Stakes (1996)

Bijou d'Inde (9 March 1993 – 19 June 2010) was a British Thoroughbred racehorse and sire. Bred in Hampshire and trained in Yorkshire he was a natural front-runner who was best at distances of around one mile. As a two-year-old he showed very good form, recording victories in the Acomb Stakes in England and the Futurity Stakes in Ireland. In the following year he was narrowly beaten in the 2000 Guineas before defeating very strong field in the St James's Palace Stakes at Royal Ascot in June. He then finished second in the Eclipse Stakes but was well beaten in his last eight races. He was retired at the end of the 1997 season and stood with little success as a breeding stallion in England, New Zealand and Turkey.

== Background ==
Bijou d'Inde was a chestnut horse with a white star bred in England by the Hampshire-based Whitsbury Manor Stud. His sire, Cadeaux Genereux won several major sprint races including the Nunthorpe Stakes and the July Cup. At stud he sired over 1,000 winners including Bahamian Bounty, Embassy, Touch of the Blues (Atto Mile) and Toylsome (Prix de la Forêt). Bijou d'Inde's dam Pushkar produced several other winners including Eradicate and Hebridean (Long Walk Hurdle).

In October 1994, the yearling was consigned to the Tattersalls sale and was bought by the trainer Mark Johnston. During his racing career, Bijou d'Inde was owned by Stuart Morrison and trained by Johnston in Middleham, North Yorkshire. Johnston was initially unimpressed by the appearance of the "gawky" chestnut, later commenting "I would have given him back if I could. But the first day he stepped on to the gallops he was very, very good".

== Racing career ==
=== 1995: two-year-old season ===
On his first appearance, Bijou d'Inde contested a six furlong maiden race at Newcastle Racecourse on 30 June and finished second, beaten a head by the favourite Mazeed. Four weeks later he ran in a similar event at Goodwood and was beaten a neck by the Peter Chapple-Hyam-trained Woodborough. Despite his two defeats, the colt was then moved up in class and was made the 11/4 second favourite for the Acomb Stakes over seven furlongs at York Racecourse on 15 August. Ridden by Darryll Holland, he led from the start before accelerating away from his opponents in the last quarter mile to win by three and a half lengths from Hammerstein. In all of his subsequent races the colt was ridden by Jason Weaver. Bijou d'Inde was sent to Ireland for his next race and stated odds-on favourite for the Group Three Futurity Stakes over one mile at the Curragh on 1 September. He disputed the lead with the Jim Bolger-trained Ceirseach before taking a clear advantage three furlongs out and won "very easily" by two and a half lengths from the other British challenger Axford. Three weeks later, on his final appearance as a juvenile, Bijou d'Inde started second favourite for the Group Two Royal Lodge Stakes at Ascot Racecourse. After being retrained by Weaver in the early stages he reached third place in the straight before fading and finishing fifth behind the Luca Cumani-trained Mons.

=== 1996: three-year-old season ===
On his three-year-old debut, Bijou d'Inde was one of thirteen colts to contest the 187th running of the classic 2000 Guineas over the Rowley Mile at Newmarket Racecourse and started at odds of 14/1. The field was a strong one, with Alhaarth heading the betting from Beauchamp King (Racing Post Trophy), Storm Trooper (Feilden Stakes), Royal Applause, Mark of Esteem and Danehill Dancer. Bijou d'Inde was among the leaders from the start and went to the front three furlongs out before engaging in a prolonged, three-way struggle with Mark of Esteem and the 40/1 outsider Even Top. In the ensuing photo-finish, Bijou d'Inde was placed third, beaten a head and a neck, with the trio finishing six lengths clear of Alhaarth in fourth. Three weeks later the colt started 3/1 second favourite behind the French-trained Spinning World in the Irish 2,000 Guineas on soft ground at the Curragh. After taking the lead in the straight he weakened in the closing stages and finished fourth behind Spinning World, Rainbow Blues and Beauchamp King, beaten six lengths by the winner. Johnston had admitted before the race that he had been uncertain about how the colt would cope with the conditions.

On 18 June at Royal Ascot Bijou d'Inde ran in the 151st edition of the St James's Palace Stakes. The Poule d'Essai des Poulains winner Ashkalani started 13/8 favourite ahead of Spinning World and Mark of Esteem with Bijou d'Inde next in the betting on 9/1. The other runners included Beuachamp King, Cayman Kai (Flying Childers Stakes, European Free Handicap) and the Godolphin challenger Wall Street. Bijou d'Inde took the lead after the first two furlongs and maintained his advantage into the straight when Ashkalani emerged as his main challenger. The French colt took the lead and went half a length up, but Bijou d'Inde rallied to overtake his opponent in the final strides and won by a head with the outsider Sorbie Tower taking third.

Bijou d'Inde was moved up in distance for his next two starts, beginning with the Eclipse Stakes over ten furlongs at Sandown Park Racecourse on 2 July in which he faced older horses for the first time. He was among the leaders from the start and finished second, beaten a neck by the five-year-old Halling. In the International Stakes at York in August he finished third to Halling and First Island beaten four and a half lengths by the winner. The colt was back to a mile for the Queen Elizabeth II Stakes at Ascot in September, but after leading for six furlongs he faded to finish sixth of the seven runners behind Mark of Esteem.

=== 1997: four-year-old season ===
In the early part of 1997 Bijou d'Inde was sent to race in Dubai and ran twice on the dirt at Nad Al Sheba Racecourse. He finished last of the four runners in a race on 9 March and then in the Dubai World Cup on 3 April. He was towards the rear of the field approaching the final turn when he was brought down by the fall of the Japanese challenger Hokuto Vega, who was running her retirement race. She had to be euthanized.

Bijou d'Inde returned to racing in Europe in autumn but never recaptured his best form. In September he finished eighth of nine behind Spinning World in the Prix du Moulin and fifth behind Air Express in the Queen Elizabeth II Stakes. In the Champion Stakes over ten furlongs in October he finished last of seven behind Pilsudski. In December he was sent to Hong Kong and finished tailed-off last of the fourteen runners in the Hong Kong Cup.

== Stud record ==
Bijou d'Inde was retired from racing to become a breeding stallion and was shuttled between the Woodland Stud at Newmarket and the Glenmorgan Stud in New Zealand. In 2000 he was sold and exported to stand at the Turkish National Stud near İzmit. He sired no winners of any consequence and died in Turkey at the stables of the Turkish Jockey Club on 19 June 2010.

== Pedigree ==
Pedigree of Bijou d'Inde (GB), chestnut stallion, 1993
| Sire Cadeaux Genereux (GB) 1985 | Young Generation (IRE); 1976 | Balidar | Will Somers |
| Sire Cadeaux Genereux (GB) 1985 | Young Generation (IRE); 1976 | Balidar | Violet Bank |
| Sire Cadeaux Genereux (GB) 1985 | Young Generation (IRE); 1976 | Brig O’Doon | Shantung |
| Sire Cadeaux Genereux (GB) 1985 | Young Generation (IRE); 1976 | Brig O’Doon | Tam O’Shanter |
| Sire Cadeaux Genereux (GB) 1985 | Smarten Up (GB); 1975 | Sharpen Up | Atan |
| Sire Cadeaux Genereux (GB) 1985 | Smarten Up (GB); 1975 | Sharpen Up | Rocchetta |
| Sire Cadeaux Genereux (GB) 1985 | Smarten Up (GB); 1975 | Languissola | Soderini* |
| Sire Cadeaux Genereux (GB) 1985 | Smarten Up (GB); 1975 | Languissola | Posh |
| Dam Pushkar (IRE) 1980 | Northfields (USA); 1968 | Northern Dancer | Nearctic |
| Dam Pushkar (IRE) 1980 | Northfields (USA); 1968 | Northern Dancer | Natalma |
| Dam Pushkar (IRE) 1980 | Northfields (USA); 1968 | Little Hut | Occupy |
| Dam Pushkar (IRE) 1980 | Northfields (USA); 1968 | Little Hut | Savage Beauty |
| Dam Pushkar (IRE) 1980 | Chippings (GB); 1972 | Busted | Crepello* |
| Dam Pushkar (IRE) 1980 | Chippings (GB); 1972 | Busted | Sans Le Sou |
| Dam Pushkar (IRE) 1980 | Chippings (GB); 1972 | Chip | Gentle Art |
| Dam Pushkar (IRE) 1980 | Chippings (GB); 1972 | Chip | Bust (Family: 14-a) |

* Bijou d'Inde is inbred 5S x 4D to the stallion Crepello, meaning that he appears fifth generation (via Soderini) on the sire side of his pedigree, and fourth generation on the dam side of his pedigree.
