= Pastoral Pursuits =

British-bred Thoroughbred racehorse

- Sire: Bahamian Bounty
- Grandsire: Cadeaux Genereux
- Dam: Star
- Damsire: Most Welcome
- Sex: Stallion
- Foaled: 3 April 2001
- Died: 23 February 2021
- Country: United Kingdom
- Colour: Bay
- Breeder: Red House Stud
- Owner: Hughie Morrison; The Pursuits Partnership; The Pursuits & National Stud Partnership
- Trainer: Hughie Morrison
- Record: 10: 6–2–0
- Earnings: £264,496

Major wins
- Sirenia Stakes (2003); Hackwood Stakes (2004); Park Stakes (2004); July Cup (2005)

Pastoral Pursuits (24 April 2000 – 23 February 2021) was a British Thoroughbred racehorse and sire. He was bred in Newmarket and sold for 24,000 guineas as a yearling. As a two-year-old he finished second on his debut but won his three remaining races including the Group Three Sirenia Stakes. His three-year-old campaign was abbreviated by injury but he added two major wins in the Hackwood Stakes and the Park Stakes. In 2005 he made only two appearances but recorded his most important victory when winning the Group One July Cup at Newmarket Racecourse. His racing career was ended by injury shortly afterwards and he was retired to stud. He had some success as a sire of winners.

== Background ==
Pastoral Pursuits was a bay horse with no white markings bred by the Newmarket based Red House Stud. He was sired by Bahamian Bounty, who had his greatest success as a two-year-old in 1996 when he won the Prix Morny and Middle Park Stakes and was voted Cartier Champion Two-year-old Colt. After retiring to the National Stud, he became reasonably successful as a sire of sprinters. Pastoral Pursuits' dam Star won one minor race as a two-year-old in 1997 before becoming a successful broodmare. She produced Pastoral Pursuits' full-brother Goodricke who won the Haydock Sprint Cup in 2005.

In October 2002, Pastoral Pursuits was consigned to the Tattersalls sale at Newmarket and bought for 24,000 guineas by the trainer Hughie Morrison. Morrison assembled a syndicate known as the Pursuits Partnership in whose ownership the colt ran for his first two seasons. He was trained by Morrison at East Ilsley throughout his racing career and was ridden in all but two of his races by Steve Drowne.

== Racing career ==
=== 2003: two-year-old season ===
Pastoral Pursuits made his racecourse debut in a maiden race over six furlongs at Windsor Racecourse on 9 June 2003. Starting a 33/1 outsider, he stayed on well in the closing stages to finish second, two and a half lengths behind the favourite Privy Seal. In July, he started favourite for a similar event at Chepstow Racecourse and recorded his first win, drawing away from his ten opponents in the last quarter mile to win by eight lengths. The colt returned to Windsor and started odds-on favourite for a minor stakes race. Ridden by Darryll Holland, he took the lead after a furlong and went clear in the closing stages to record an "impressive" eight length victory from the Richard Hannon Sr.-trained King Carnival.

In September, Pastoral Pursuits was moved up in class for the Group Three Sirenia Stakes over six furlongs at Kempton Park Racecourse and started 11/10 favourite against eight opponents. Drowne tracked the leaders before sending Pastoral Pursuits into the lead approaching the final quarter mile. The colt stayed on in the closing stages to win by two lengths and a neck from Diospyros Blue and Cartography.

=== 2004: three-year-old season ===
Pastoral Pursuits was regarded as a contender for the 2000 Guineas but missed the spring of 2004 after chipping a bone in his knee early in the year He eventually reappeared in June when he contested the Listed Surrey Stakes over seven furlongs at Sandown Park Racecourse. Starting at 9/1 in a six-runner field he took the lead a furlong from the finish but tired in the closing stages and was beaten half a length by the John Gosden-trained Madid, to whom he was conceding six pounds. In the following month, the colt started favourite against ten opponents in the Hackwood Stakes over six furlongs at Newbury Racecourse. After starting slowly, he took the lead inside the final furlong and got the best of in a tight, three-way struggle to win by a head and a neck from Cartography and Dowager.

At Doncaster Racecourse on 9 September, Pastoral Pursuits was moved up in class and distance to contest the Group Two Park Stakes over seven furlongs. He started 5/1 fourth choice in the betting behind Firebreak (Mill Reef Stakes, Supreme Stakes, Godolphin Mile), Tillerman (Celebration Mile) and Fong's Thong (Thoroughbred Stakes), whilst the other runners included the four-year-old Court Masterpiece. Pastoral Pursuits started slowly and appeared to be struggling before beginning to make progress approaching the last quarter mile. He took the lead inside the final furlong and won by one and a quarter lengths from Firebreak, with Court Masterpiece a length and a half away in third. Drowne, who rated Pastoral Pursuits the best horse he had ridden said, "It might not look impressive from the stands, because I am always rowing away in the early stages, but you know he will always find for you and he really lengthened in the final furlong".

On his final appearance of the season, Pastoral Pursuits was sent to France for the Group One Prix de la Forêt over 1400 metres at Longchamp Racecourse in October. He never looked likely to win and finished fifth of the seven runners behind Somnus.

=== 2005: four-year-old season ===
Before the start of the 2005 season, a share in Pastoral Pursuits was sold to the National Stud. As in the previous season, the colt missed the early part of the year and began his campaign in June. At the Royal Meeting which was held that year at York Racecourse, he was moved up in distance and started a 20/1 outsider for the Queen Anne Stakes over one mile. He lost any chance when slipping on the final turn and finished seventh of the ten runners behind Valixir. On 7 July the colt was dropped back to sprint distances for the July Cup and started at odds of 22/1 in a nineteen-runner field. He was ridden by John Egan as Drowne was required to ride the outsider Avonbridge for the Roger Charlton stable. Morrison had been uncertain about running the colt as heavy rain on the previous day had softened the ground. Somnus and Soldier's Tale (winner of the Chipchase Stakes) started joint-favourites, whilst the other fancied horses included Iffraaj (Wokingham Stakes), Galeota (Mill Reef Stakes), Camacho (Sandy Lane Stakes), Balmont (Middle Park Stakes), Moss Vale (Sandy Lane Stakes) and Royal Millennium (Bentinck Stakes). The field spread across the wide Newmarket straight, with Pastoral Pursuits among the leaders on the far side (the left side from the jockeys' viewpoint) as Balmont led down the centre of the track. Pastoral Pursuits made a forward move approaching the final furlong, took the lead in the closing stages and won by one and a half lengths from Avonbridge, with Etlaala taking third ahead of Soldier's Tale and Balmont. Morrison commented, "We always thought he was a bloody good horse and he proved it today. I have to thank all my staff, especially my assistant Gerry Gracey, who said to me that we should run him and that we would win a Group One".

Pastoral Pursuits sustained a leg injury shortly after the race and was retired from racing at the end of July. Morrison explained that although the injury was not serious it would prevent him from contesting his two major targets: the Prix Maurice de Gheest in August and the Haydock Sprint Cup in early September.

== Stud record ==
Pastoral Pursuits was retired from racing to stand as a breeding stallion at The National Stud. His best winners have included Pastoral Player (John of Gaunt Stakes), Angel's Pursuit (Carnarvon Stakes), Sagramor (Britannia Stakes), Auld Burns (Tattersalls Millions), Rose Blossom (Summer Stakes) and Ventura Mist (Two-year-old Trophy). Pastoral Pursuits died of a ruptured blood vessel on 23 February 2021 at age 20.

== Pedigree ==
Pedigree of Pastoral Pursuits (GB), bay stallion, 2001
Sire Bahamian Bounty (GB) 1994	Cadeaux Genereux (GB); 1985	Young Generation	Balidar
Sire Bahamian Bounty (GB) 1994	Cadeaux Genereux (GB); 1985	Young Generation	Brig o'Doon
Sire Bahamian Bounty (GB) 1994	Cadeaux Genereux (GB); 1985	Smarten Up	Sharpen Up
Sire Bahamian Bounty (GB) 1994	Cadeaux Genereux (GB); 1985	Smarten Up	Languissola
Sire Bahamian Bounty (GB) 1994	Clarentia (GB); 1984	Ballad Rock	Bold Lad (IRE)
Sire Bahamian Bounty (GB) 1994	Clarentia (GB); 1984	Ballad Rock	True Rocket
Sire Bahamian Bounty (GB) 1994	Clarentia (GB); 1984	Laharden	Mount Hagen
Sire Bahamian Bounty (GB) 1994	Clarentia (GB); 1984	Laharden	Sinella
Dam Star (GB) 1995	Most Welcome (IRE); 1984	Be My Guest	Northern Dancer
Dam Star (GB) 1995	Most Welcome (IRE); 1984	Be My Guest	What A Treat
Dam Star (GB) 1995	Most Welcome (IRE); 1984	Topsy	Habitat
Dam Star (GB) 1995	Most Welcome (IRE); 1984	Topsy	Furioso
Dam Star (GB) 1995	Marista (GB); 1977	Mansingh	Jaipur
Dam Star (GB) 1995	Marista (GB); 1977	Mansingh	Tutasi
Dam Star (GB) 1995	Marista (GB); 1977	Evendo	Derring-Do
Dam Star (GB) 1995	Marista (GB); 1977	Evendo	Christmas Eve (Family: 14-f)
