= Gainsborough Stud =

Coordinates: 51°21′19″N 1°23′02″W

Gainsborough Stud is a stud farm based in Woolton Hill, Hampshire, 3 miles (4.8 km) outside Newbury. It is owned by United Arab Emirates-based international racing operation Godolphin. It was established in 1910 to stand the racehorse Gainsborough and sold in 1981 to Maktoum bin Rashid Al Maktoum, who operated it as part of his international horse breeding and racing interests, including training horses to race under his own and Godolphin's colours. On his death, Gainsborough Stud passed to Mohammed bin Rashid Al Maktoum and became part of the Darley and then the Godolphin operations.

== Origins ==
Gainsborough Stud was originally called Harwood Stud, and was established at Woolton Hill near Newbury, Berkshire, in 1910 by Lady James Douglas as a home for her racehorse Gainsborough, who won the English Triple Crown in 1918. Gainsborough also won the 2,000 Guineas, marking the first time that a horse bred by a woman won one of the British Classic Races and the first time a Classic winner carried a woman's colours. In 1940, failing health forced Lady Douglas to sell Harwood Stud, including Gainsborough. Under an agreement with new owner Herbert Blagrave, Gainsborough remained there until his death in 1945. He is buried on the 120-acre (0.49 km^{2}) property, which was eventually renamed Gainsborough Stud in his honour.

== International operation ==
In 1981, the stud farm was bought by Maktoum bin Rashid Al Maktoum.

The stud farm was operated by Maktoum's company, Gainsborough Stud Management, which maintained Gainsborough Farm in central Kentucky (bought in 1984) as well as two facilities in Ireland, Wood Park Stud in Co Meath (bought from the de Burgh family in April 1989) and Ballysheehan Stud.

The international operation also stood horses in a number of stud farms in the UK, Ireland and America. In all Maktoum had over 200 horses in training under a roster of ten trainers. Gainsborough-bred horses ran under Maktoum's own colours, the Gainsborough colours and also for Godolphin.

== Move to Godolphin ==
Maktoum was a partner in Sheikh Mohammed's Godolphin racing operation and, on his death in 2006, the horses he owned standing at Gainsborough, as well as the stud farm itself, became part of Sheikh Mohammed's Darley breeding operation, including Green Desert, Storming Home, Royal Applause, Cadeaux Genereux, Lucky Story and Fantastic Light, (already under Darley at Dalham Hall) who was named United States Champion Male Turf Horse, European Horse of the Year and European Champion Older Horse in 2001.

In Ireland, the operation stood Dilshaan and Key Of Luck at Tara Stud, Kris Kin at Derrinstown Stud, Darley sire Shamardal at Kildangan Stud and Touch Of The Blues at the Irish National Stud. It also had horses in France, Canada and South Africa. Of the three horses standing in America for Gainsborough, two – Elusive Quality and Quiet American – were moved to Sheikh Mohammed's Jonabell Farm. The third horse, Rahy, had sired Fantastic Light.

A new company, Rabbah Bloodstock, was founded to look after the interests of the other owners standing horses at Gainsborough. Soon after the reorganisation, Gainsborough racing manager and champion jockey Joe Mercer retired.

In 2016, a fire broke out in cottages at the stud farm, destroying a staff accommodation building.
