= In Command (horse) =

Irish-bred Thoroughbred racehorse

- Sire: Sadler's Wells
- Grandsire: Northern Dancer
- Dam: Flying Melody
- Damsire: Auction Ring
- Sex: Stallion
- Foaled: 28 February 1994
- Country: Ireland
- Colour: Bay
- Breeder: Gainsborough Stud
- Owner: Maktoum Al Maktoum
- Trainer: Barry Hills
- Record: 9: 2-1-2
- Earnings: £125,165

Major wins
- Dewhurst Stakes (1996)

In Command (foaled 28 February 1994) is an Irish-bred, British-trained Thoroughbred racehorse and sire. Bred and owned by Maktoum Al Maktoum he was trained in England by Barry Hills. He showed his best form as a two-year-old in 1996 when he was placed in the Acomb Stakes, Champagne Stakes and Middle Park Stakes before recording his biggest success in the Dewhurst Stakes. He failed to win in four subsequent races and was retired from racing in 1998. He had no success as a breeding stallion.

== Background ==
In Command was a bay horse bred in Ireland by his owner Maktoum Al Maktoum's Gainsborough Stud. The colt was sent into training in England with Barry Hills at Lambourn in Berkshire and was ridden in all of his races by Hills' son Michael.

In Command was from the ninth crop of foals sired by Sadler's Wells, who won the Irish 2000 Guineas, Eclipse Stakes and Irish Champion Stakes in 1984 went on to be the Champion sire on fourteen occasions. In Command's dam Flying Melody was a successful racehorse who became an outstanding broodmare, producing Royal Applause and Lyric Fantasy. As a descendant of the broodmare Oola Hills, Flying Melody was related to many notable Thoroughbreds including Park Top and Pappa Fourway.

== Racing career ==
=== 1996: two-year-old season ===
In Command began his racing career in a maiden race over six furlongs at Goodwood Racecourse on 31 July in which he started the 6/5 favourite in an eight-runner field. He took the lead a furlong out and won by half a length from the Mick Channon-trained Mile High. He was then moved up in class and distance for the Acomb Stakes over seven furlongs at York Racecourse on 20 August in which he started odds-on favourite but finished third behind Revoque and Symonds Inn. Despite his defeat In Command was stepped up again in class for the Group Two Champagne Stakes at Doncaster Racecourse on 13 September. Starting the 9/1 outsider of the four runners he took the lead a quarter of a mile from the finish but was overtaken and beaten three and a half lengths into second by the John Dunlop-trained Bahhare. On 3 October the colt was moved up to Group One class for the Group One Middle Park Stakes over six furlongs on good-to-firm ground at Newmarket Racecourse and started the 8/1 fifth choice in the betting behind Bahamian Bounty, Indian Rocket (Mill Reef Stakes), Hurricane State and Easycall (Richmond Stakes, Flying Childers Stakes). In Command was among the leaders from the start and stayed on well in the closing stages to finish third behind Bahamian Bounty and Muchea.

Fifteen days after his run in the Middle Park Stakes, In Command returned to Newmarket to contest Britain's most prestigious race for two-year-olds, the Dewhurst Stakes on rain-softened ground. Bahamian Bounty started 7/2 joint favourite alongside the Ed Dunlop-trained Kahal with In Command starting at odds of 10/1. The other five runners were Desert King, The West (runner-up in the Prix de la Salamandre), Musical Pursuit and Air Express. After tracking the leaders In Command took the lead approaching the final furlong and held off the challenges of the outsiders Musical Pursuit and Air Express to win by a head and a neck. After the race Barry Hills said "he horse was helped by the rain which has made a difference between winning and losing. He has done well since the Middle Park and I was very reassured to see the rain." Michael Hills commented "The extra furlong and the cut in the ground have made all the difference. He was getting a little tired close home and losing it a bit, but he will be much stronger next season. Very few of Sadler's Wells' offspring win Group One two-year- old races so he must be a bit special".

=== 1997: three-year-old season ===
In Command began his second season in the Greenham Stakes (a major trial race for the 2000 Guineas) over seven furlongs at Newbury Racecourse on 19 April. After leading in the early stages he was overtaken in the last quarter mile and finished fourth behind Yalaietanee, Revoque and Muchea. In Command was off the racecourse for almost two months before he returned in the St James's Palace Stakes at Royal Ascot in which he started a 25/1 outsider and finished sixth behind Starborough. After another lengthy absence he contested the Park Stakes at Doncaster in September and finished seventh of the eight runners behind the four-year-old Almushtarak.

=== 1998: four-year-old season ===
In Command remained in training as a four-year-old but made only one appearance. In the Doncaster Mile Stakes on 26 March he started the 9/4 favourite but finished last of the eight runners behind Hornbeam.

== Assessment ==
In the 1997 International Classification of European two-year-olds In Command was given a rating of 117 making him the lowest-rated Dewhurst Stakes since Dr Devious in 1991.

== Stud record ==
At the end of his racing career In Command was retired to become a breeding stallion. He had very little success as a sire of winners and by 2005 was standing at a fee of £1,500 at the Bracklynn Stud in Ireland.

== Pedigree ==
Pedigree of In Command (IRE), bay stallion, 1994
| Sire Sadler's Wells (USA) 1981 | Northern Dancer (CAN); 1961 | Nearctic | Nearco |
| Sire Sadler's Wells (USA) 1981 | Northern Dancer (CAN); 1961 | Nearctic | Lady Angela |
| Sire Sadler's Wells (USA) 1981 | Northern Dancer (CAN); 1961 | Natalma | Native Dancer |
| Sire Sadler's Wells (USA) 1981 | Northern Dancer (CAN); 1961 | Natalma | Almahmoud |
| Sire Sadler's Wells (USA) 1981 | Fairy Bridge (USA); 1975 | Bold Reason | Hail To Reason |
| Sire Sadler's Wells (USA) 1981 | Fairy Bridge (USA); 1975 | Bold Reason | Lalun |
| Sire Sadler's Wells (USA) 1981 | Fairy Bridge (USA); 1975 | Special | Forli |
| Sire Sadler's Wells (USA) 1981 | Fairy Bridge (USA); 1975 | Special | Thong |
| Dam Flying Melody (IRE) 1979 | Auction Ring (USA); 1972 | Bold Bidder | Bold Ruler |
| Dam Flying Melody (IRE) 1979 | Auction Ring (USA); 1972 | Bold Bidder | High Bid |
| Dam Flying Melody (IRE) 1979 | Auction Ring (USA); 1972 | Hooplah | Hillary |
| Dam Flying Melody (IRE) 1979 | Auction Ring (USA); 1972 | Hooplah | Beadah |
| Dam Flying Melody (IRE) 1979 | Whispering Star (GB); 1963 | Sound Track | Whistler |
| Dam Flying Melody (IRE) 1979 | Whispering Star (GB); 1963 | Sound Track | Bridle Way |
| Dam Flying Melody (IRE) 1979 | Whispering Star (GB); 1963 | Peggy West | Premonition |
| Dam Flying Melody (IRE) 1979 | Whispering Star (GB); 1963 | Peggy West | Oola Hills (Family: 26) |
