= Goodricke (horse) =

British-bred Thoroughbred racehorse

- Sire: Bahamian Bounty
- Grandsire: Cadeaux Genereux
- Dam: Star
- Damsire: Most Welcome
- Sex: Stallion
- Foaled: 12 April 2002
- Country: United Kingdom
- Colour: Bay
- Breeder: Red House Stud
- Owner: Sheikh Mohammed; Jumeirah Racing; Godolphin
- Trainer: David Loder; Saeed bin Suroor
- Record: 13: 5-4-0
- Earnings: £237,084

Major wins
- William Hill Sprint Cup (2005)

Goodricke (foaled 12 April 2002) is a British Thoroughbred racehorse and sire. A specialist sprinter who excelled over six and seven furlongs and recorded his biggest win in the 2005 William Hill Sprint Cup. He showed some promise as a two-year-old, winning two minor races, but missed the second half of the year after running poorly in the Coventry Stakes. In the following year he competed in handicaps and minor stakes before emerging as a top class performer with a second place in the Prix Maurice de Gheest followed by his win in the Spring Cup. He remained in training as a four-year-old but ran only twice and failed to recover his best form. He was retired to stud but has had very little success as a breeding stallion.

== Background ==
Goodricke was a bay horse with a small white star bred by the Newmarket based Red House Stud. He was sired by Bahamian Bounty, who had his greatest success as a two-year-old in 1996 when he won the Prix Morny and Middle Park Stakes and was voted Cartier Champion Two-year-old Colt. After retiring to the National Stud, he became reasonably successful as a sire of sprinters. Goodricke's dam Star won one minor race as a two-year-old in 1997 before becoming a successful broodmare. She produced Goodricke's full-brother Pastoral Pursuits who won the July Cup in 2005.

In October 2003 the yearling colt was offered for sale at Tattersalls and was bought for 110,000 guineas by the bloodstock agent Richard O'Gorman on behalf of Sheikh Mohammed. The colt was sent into training with David Loder at Newmarket, Suffolk.

== Racing career ==
=== 2004: two-year-old season ===
After finishing second in a maiden race over five furlongs at Windsor Racecourse on 5 April the colt started at odds of 1/5 for a similar event at Leicester Racecourse later that month and recorded his first success, winning by five lengths from Langston Bay. On 14 May the colt contested a novice race (for horses with no more than one previous win) over six furlongs at Nottingham Racecourse. Ridden by Tom Queally, and starting the 4/5 favourite, he took the lead approaching the final furlong and went clear of his rivals to win by three lengths. In June the colt was moved up in class to contest the Group Two Coventry Stakes at Royal Ascot. He started a 14/1 outsider and finished ninth of the thirteen runners behind the John Gosden-trained Iceman.

=== 2005: three-year-old season ===
On his three-year-old debut Goodricke, racing in the colours of Jumeirah Racing, carried 126 pounds in a handicap race over six furlongs at Salisbury Racecourse on 1 May. Returning to the track after an absence of more than ten months he was equipped with a visor for the first time. After starting slowly he stayed on strongly in the closing stages and dead-heated with the Terry Mills-trained Resplendent Glory. He then started favourite for a Listed handicap at York Racecourse ten days later but finished seventh after he was badly hampered at the start, causing his saddle to slip. On 3 June he contested the Listed Surrey Stakes over seven furlongs at Epsom Racecourse and finished second to the Mill Reef Stakes Galeota. He then returned to the ownership of Sheikh Mohammed. At the end of the month the colt started favourite for a race over six furlongs at Newbury Racecourse in which he was ridden by Jamie Spencer. Goodricke took the lead entering the final furlong and drew away from his opponents to win "easily" by four lengths.

On 23 July Goodricke was matched against older horses in a valuable seven furlong handicap at Newbury in which he was assigned a weight of 119 pounds. He finished second of the twenty-four runners, beaten half a length by the five year old New Seeker after staying on strongly in the closing stages. The colt was then stepped up sharply in class when he was sent to France for the Group One Prix Maurice de Gheest over 1300 metres at Deauville Racecourse. Ridden by Olivier Peslier and starting a 20/1 outsider he appeared to be struggling in the early stages but made steady progress in the straight to finish second, half a length behind the favourite Whipper.

On 3 September Goodricke started a 14/1 outsider for the Group One William Hill Sprint Cup over six furlongs at Haydock Park. The favourite for the race was Proclamation, owned by Sheikh Mohammed's wife Princess Haya of Jordan and racing in the Godolphin colours. His fifteen other opponents included, Gift Horse (Stewards' Cup), La Cucaracha, Galeota, Somnus, Lucky Spin (Summer Stakes), Etlaala (Champagne Stakes), Patavellian (Stewards' Cup) and Fayr Jag (Golden Jubilee Stakes). Goodricke was hampered at the start and was switched to the right to obtain a clear run. He overtook the long-time leader Patavellian inside the final furlong and stayed on strongly to win by a length from La Cucaracha, with the 50/1 outsider Ashdown Express a length away in third. After the race Jamie Spencer admitted to being surprised by the colt's performance, commenting "I didn't really believe I could win the race and I thought he would run really well to be placed".

=== 2006: four-year-old season ===
After Loder retired from training at the end of 2005 Goodricke was transferred to the ownership of Sheikh Mohammed's Godolphin team and was trained thereafter by Saeed bin Suroor. After an absence of over a year he returned in a minor race at Yarmouth Racecourse on 12 September. He started the 1/4 favourite but finished fourth of the six runners behind Riotous Applause. Sixteen days later he contested the Listed Guisborough Stakes over seven furlongs at Redcar Racecourse. He again started favourite but failed to recover after swerving at the start and finished ninth of the eleven runners behind New Seeker.

== Stud record ==
Goodricke was retired from racing to become a breeding stallion. He stood for a season the Overbury Stud in Gloucestershire in 2007 before moving to the Allevamento Fattoria Renaccino in Italy for the next two years. He was moved to the Gestüt Ohlerweiherhof in Germany in 2010 and was later relocated to the Czech Republic. He has attracted little interest and sired only a few minor winners.

== Pedigree ==
Pedigree of Goodricke (GB), bay stallion, 2002
Sire Bahamian Bounty (GB) 1994	Cadeaux Genereux (GB); 1985	Young Generation	Balidar
Sire Bahamian Bounty (GB) 1994	Cadeaux Genereux (GB); 1985	Young Generation	Brig o'Doon
Sire Bahamian Bounty (GB) 1994	Cadeaux Genereux (GB); 1985	Smarten Up	Sharpen Up
Sire Bahamian Bounty (GB) 1994	Cadeaux Genereux (GB); 1985	Smarten Up	Languissola
Sire Bahamian Bounty (GB) 1994	Clarentia (GB); 1984	Ballad Rock	Bold Lad (IRE)
Sire Bahamian Bounty (GB) 1994	Clarentia (GB); 1984	Ballad Rock	True Rocket
Sire Bahamian Bounty (GB) 1994	Clarentia (GB); 1984	Laharden	Mount Hagen
Sire Bahamian Bounty (GB) 1994	Clarentia (GB); 1984	Laharden	Sinella
Dam Star (GB) 1995	Most Welcome (IRE); 1984	Be My Guest	Northern Dancer
Dam Star (GB) 1995	Most Welcome (IRE); 1984	Be My Guest	What A Treat
Dam Star (GB) 1995	Most Welcome (IRE); 1984	Topsy	Habitat
Dam Star (GB) 1995	Most Welcome (IRE); 1984	Topsy	Furioso
Dam Star (GB) 1995	Marista (GB); 1977	Mansingh	Jaipur
Dam Star (GB) 1995	Marista (GB); 1977	Mansingh	Tutasi
Dam Star (GB) 1995	Marista (GB); 1977	Evendo	Derring-Do
Dam Star (GB) 1995	Marista (GB); 1977	Evendo	Christmas Eve (Family: 14-f)
