= Intello =

German-bred Thoroughbred racehorse

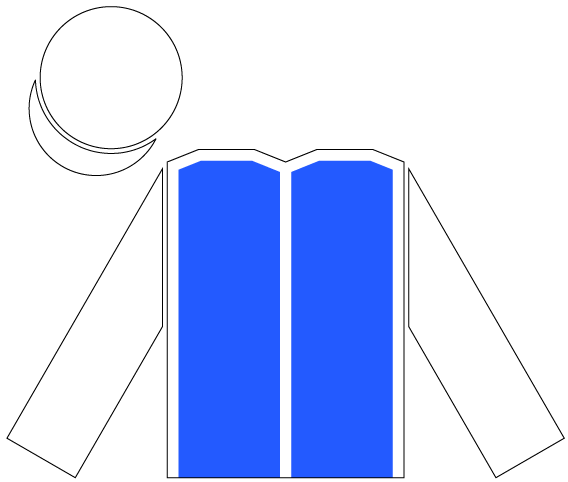
- Racing silks of the Wertheimer family
- Sire: Galileo
- Grandsire: Sadler's Wells
- Dam: Impressionnante
- Damsire: Danehill
- Sex: Colt
- Foaled: 14 April 2010
- Country: Germany
- Colour: Bay
- Breeder: Wertheimer et Frère
- Owner: Wertheimer et Frère
- Trainer: André Fabre
- Record: 9: 6-0-3
- Earnings: £913,885

Major wins
- Feilden Stakes (2013); Prix du Jockey Club (2013); Prix Messidor (2013); Prix du Prince d'Orange (2013)

Intello (foaled 14 April 2010) is a German-bred, French-trained Thoroughbred racehorse and stallion. After winning two minor races as a two-year-old he has won the Feilden Stakes, Prix du Jockey Club and Prix Messidor in 2013. During his racing career Intello was trained by André Fabre and owned by Wertheimer et Frère.

== Background ==
Intello is a bay colt bred by Wertheimer et Frère and foaled on 14 April 2010. He was sired by Galileo, who won The Derby, Irish Derby and King George VI and Queen Elizabeth Stakes in 2001. Galileo has since become one of the world's top sires and has been champion sire of Great Britain and Ireland four times. Amongst his other progeny are Teofilo, New Approach, Rip Van Winkle, Cape Blanco, Frankel and Nathaniel. Intello's dam is Impressionnante, a daughter of Danehill. Impressionnante was trained by Carlos Laffon-Parias and won the Prix de Sandringham in 2006. Intello was trained by André Fabre.

== Racing career ==
=== 2012: two-year-old season ===
Intello's first race was in a 1600-metre maiden at Longchamp on 22 September 2012, which he won by a short-head. His only other race as a two-year-old was a conditions race at Maisons-Laffitte. He started as the odds-on favourite and beat Kapstadt by half a length to win the race.

=== 2013: three-year-old season ===
Intello started his three-year-old campaign by travelling to England for the Feilden Stakes at Newmarket in April 2013. He was ridden by regular jockey Olivier Peslier and started as the 6/4 favourite. After taking the lead with two furlongs (400 metres) left to run, he pulled clear to win by 3 1/4 lengths from King George River, who in turn was seven lengths clear of third-placed Gorly Awaits. His next start was Longchamp in the Poule d'Essai des Poulains, where he was third favourite in the betting at 7/1. Olympic Glory was the 3/1 favourite, with Style Vendôme starting second favourite. In the early stages of the race he was held up near the rear of the field by Maxime Guyon. He made progress through the field, but got boxed in between 600 and 400 metres out, before being taken wide by Guyon, when he stayed on to finish third, less than half a length behind winner Style Vendôme.

Olivier Peslier was Intello's jockey again for the Prix du Jockey Club, for which he started favourite. Peslier positioned his near the front of the field and challenged with 400 metres still to run. He took the lead 300 metres out and pulled clear to win by two lengths from Morandi who just beat Sky Hunter to take second place. In July he dropped back in class for the Group 3 Prix Messidor. Starting as he short-priced favourite, he took the lead inside the final 200 metres and won the race, beating runner-up Mainsail by a length and a half. In August Intello dropped back in distance for the Prix Jacques Le Marois at Deauville Racecourse. In a very competitive field ran third to Moonlight Cloud and Olympic Glory, finishing ahead of Declaration of War, Dawn Approach and Elusive Kate. On 21 September, Intello prepared for a run in the Prix de l'Arc de Triomphe by winning the Prix du Prince d'Orange over 2000m at Longchamp. In the Arc on 6 October, Intello started at odds of 10/1 in a field of seventeen runners. He was among the leaders from the start and eventually finished third, beaten five lengths and a neck by Treve and Orfevre.

== Stud career ==
In 2014 Intello was retired from racing to perform stud duties. As of 2022 he stands at Haras du Quesnay for a service fee of €8,000.

=== Notable progeny ===
c = colt, f = filly, g = gelding

Foaled	Name	Sex	Major wins
2015	Intellogent	g	Prix Jean Prat
2018	Adhamo	c	United Nations Stakes
2019	Junko	g	Grosser Preis von Bayern, Hong Kong Vase

== Pedigree ==
Pedigree of Intello, bay colt, 2010
Sire Galileo (IRE) b. 1998	Sadler's Wells (USA) b. 1981	Northern Dancer* b. 1961	Nearctic
Sire Galileo (IRE) b. 1998	Sadler's Wells (USA) b. 1981	Northern Dancer* b. 1961	Natalma
Sire Galileo (IRE) b. 1998	Sadler's Wells (USA) b. 1981	Fairy Bridge b. 1975	Bold Reason
Sire Galileo (IRE) b. 1998	Sadler's Wells (USA) b. 1981	Fairy Bridge b. 1975	Special
Sire Galileo (IRE) b. 1998	Urban Sea (USA) ch. 1989	Miswaki ch. 1978	Mr. Prospector
Sire Galileo (IRE) b. 1998	Urban Sea (USA) ch. 1989	Miswaki ch. 1978	Hopespringseternal
Sire Galileo (IRE) b. 1998	Urban Sea (USA) ch. 1989	Allegretta ch. 1978	Lombard
Sire Galileo (IRE) b. 1998	Urban Sea (USA) ch. 1989	Allegretta ch. 1978	Anatevka
Dam Impressionnante (GB) b. 2003	Danehill (USA) b. 1986	Danzig b. 1977	Northern Dancer*
Dam Impressionnante (GB) b. 2003	Danehill (USA) b. 1986	Danzig b. 1977	Pas De Nom
Dam Impressionnante (GB) b. 2003	Danehill (USA) b. 1986	Razyana b. 1981	His Majesty
Dam Impressionnante (GB) b. 2003	Danehill (USA) b. 1986	Razyana b. 1981	Spring Adieu
Dam Impressionnante (GB) b. 2003	Occupandiste (IRE) b. 1993	Kaldoun gr. 1975	Caro
Dam Impressionnante (GB) b. 2003	Occupandiste (IRE) b. 1993	Kaldoun gr. 1975	Katana
Dam Impressionnante (GB) b. 2003	Occupandiste (IRE) b. 1993	Only Seule ch. 1988	Lyphard
Dam Impressionnante (GB) b. 2003	Occupandiste (IRE) b. 1993	Only Seule ch. 1988	Elle Seule

Note: b. = Bay, ch. = Chestnut, gr. = Grey

* Intello is inbred 3 × 4 to Northern Dancer, meaning that the stallion appears once in the third generation and once in the fourth generation of his pedigree.
