= Cadeaux Genereux =

British-bred Thoroughbred racehorse

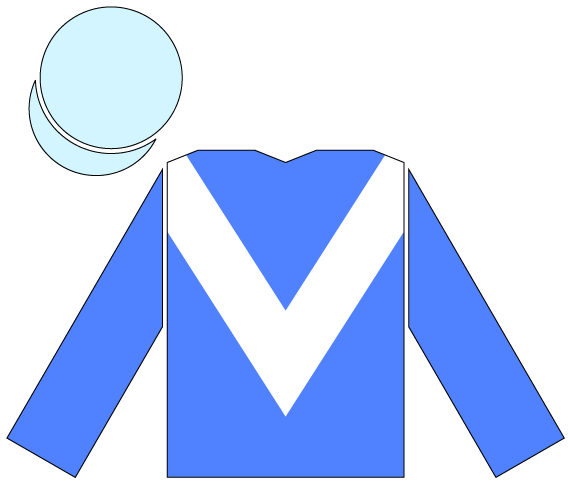
- Racing colours of Maktoum Al Maktoum
- Sire: Young Generation
- Grandsire: Balidar
- Dam: Smarten Up
- Damsire: Sharpen Up
- Sex: Stallion
- Foaled: 22 March 1985
- Country: United Kingdom
- Colour: Chestnut
- Breeder: Helen Kennard
- Owner: Maktoum Al Maktoum
- Trainer: Olivier Douieb; Alex Scott
- Record: 15:7-1-3
- Earnings: £293,453

Major wins
- Van Geest Criterion Stakes (1988); Krug Diadem Stakes (1988); Carroll Foundation July Cup (1989); William Hill Sprint Championship (1989)

Awards
- Timeform rating 131

Cadeaux Genereux (22 March 1985 – 18 November 2010) was a British Thoroughbred racehorse and sire. A specialist sprinter, he came to prominence in 1988 when he won five races including the Criterion Stakes and the Diadem Stakes and was disqualified after finishing first in the Prix de l'Abbaye. After two disappointing efforts early in 1989 he established himself as the best sprinter in Europe with wins in the July Cup and the William Hill Sprint Championship. He was then retired to stud where he had considerable success as a sire of winners.

== Background ==
Cadeaux Genereux was a chestnut horse with a small white star, bred at the Whitsbury Manor Stud in Hampshire by Helen and Major Bobby Kennard. He was sired by Young Generation, a horse whose wins included the Prix Jean Prat and the Lockinge Stakes in 1979. His dam, Smarten Up was a high-class racemare who dead-heated for the Temple Stakes in 1978.

As a yearling, Cadeaux Genereux was sold to Maktoum Al Maktoum and sent into training with Olivier Douieb at Newmarket, Suffolk. He was ridden in most of his races by either Pat Eddery or his brother Paul

== Racing career ==
=== 1988: three-year-old season ===
Having shown some promise as a two-year-old, finishing fourth and third in two starts Cadeaux Genereux began his second season with four consecutive victories. At Pontefract Racecourse in April he recorded his first success when he was ridden by Paul Eddery to a "facile" four length victory in a Graduation race (restricted to maidens and horses with one previous win) over five furlongs. Paul was again riding at Newmarket racecourse a month later, when Cadeaux Genereux won a handicap race by two and a half lengths. Pat Eddery took over the ride at York in June, when Cadeaux Genereux started 4/5 for the Golden Spurs Trophy and won by half a length from Silver Fling, a three-year-old filly who was carrying fourteen pounds more than the winner. Two weeks later, the colt was moved up in class to contest the Group Three Criterion Stakes at Newmarket. Pat Eddery restrained the colt in the early stages of the seven furlong contest before taking the lead in the final furlong. Cadeaux Genereux held off the late rally of the Henry Cecil-trained favourite Salse to win by a short head.

In August, Cadeaux Genereux was moved up in class again, when he traveled to France to contest the Prix Maurice de Gheest (then a Group Two race) over 1300 metres at Deauville Racecourse. Ridden by Paul Eddery, he was among the leaders from the start and finished second of the fifteen runners behind the filly Blue Note. He returned to England eleven days later for the Group One William Hill Sprint Championship in which he finished sixth on "soggy" ground behind Handsome Sailor, who won by one and a half lengths from Silver Fling. The Diadem Stakes at Ascot featured a rematch between Cadeaux Genereux and Blue Note. Pat Eddery held the colt up in the early stages before moving up to take the lead inside the final furlong and winning by three quarters of a length from Point of Light, with Blue Note unplaced. Cadeaux Genereux's final race of the season was the Prix de l'Abbaye over 1000 metres at Longchamp Racecourse on 2 October, when his opponents included Handsome Sailor, Silver Fling, Point of Light and Caerwent. Cadeaux Genereux took the lead inside the last 200 metres and won from Handsome Sailor, but was disqualified and placed last by the stewards for causing interference in the early stages, with Pat Eddery receiving an eight-day riding ban.

=== 1989: four-year-old season ===
In 1989 Olivier Douieb gave up the training of Maktoum Al Maktoum's horses and the stable was taken over by the first-season trainer Alex Scott. On his debut as a four-year-old Cadeaux Genereux started 4/6 favourite for the Temple Stakes at Sandown Park Racecourse on 29 May but finished third behind the three-year-old Dancing Dissident. In the King's Stand Stakes at Royal Ascot he again ran below expectations, finishing eighth behind the favourite Indian Ridge. At Newmarket on 13 July, Cadeaux Genereux, ridden by Paul Eddery started at odds of 10/1 for the July Cup over six furlongs. The colt took the lead approaching the final furlong and held the late challenge of the Coronation Stakes winner Golden Opinion to win by a head, with the favourite Danehill two and a half lengths back in third and Handsome Sailor unplaced. The winning time of 1.09.82 was a new course record by a 1.2 second margin.

On 24 August, Cadeaux Genereux contested his second William Hill Sprint Championship at York. He was ridden by Pat Eddery and started 11/10 favourite in a field which included Dancing Dissident and Silver Fling. He took the lead inside the final furlong and won by three quarters of a length and a short head from Silver Fling and Statoblest. In September, Cadeaux Genereux was moved up in distance to contest the Prix du Moulin over 1600 metres at Longchamp. He ended his career by finishing third, beaten two lengths and a short head by the French-trained colts Polish Precedent and Squill.

== Assessment ==
Cadeaux Genereux was given a rating of 131 by the independent Timeform organisation in 1989. In their book A Century of Champions, based on a modified version of the Timeform ratings, John Randall and Tony Morris rated Cadeaux Genereux the fiftieth best sprinter trained in Britain or Ireland during the 20th century.

== Stud record ==
Cadeaux Genereux retired from racing and returned to his birthplace to become a breeding stallion at Whitsbury Manor. He proved to be a successful sire with his progeny including eight Group/Grade I winners:

- Hoh Magic (foaled 1992) won Prix Morny
- Bijou d'Inde (1993) St James's Palace Stakes
- Bahamian Bounty (1994) Prix Morny, Middle Park Stakes
- Embassy (1995) Cheveley Park Stakes
- Touch of the Blues (1997) Atto Mile
- May Ball (1997) Prix Maurice de Gheest
- Toylsome (1999) Prix de la Forêt
- Donativum (2006) Breeders' Cup Juvenile Turf
- Red Cadeaux (2006) Hong Kong Vase

He was also the broodmare sire of Notnowcato, Rajeem (Falmouth Stakes) and Dream Ahead.

Cadeaux Genereux died in his sleep at Whitsbury on 18 November 2010. The stud manager Charlie Okshott said, "He has been a wonderful, wonderful servant to us. Because of his age we were getting a bit worried about him and his liver and kidneys weren't functioning too well and he was getting a bit wobbly. Thankfully, given the circumstances he died peacefully in his sleep". The Racing Post called him "one of the most influential British stallions of the last 15 years".

== Sire line tree ==
- Cadeaux Genereux
  - Bijou d'Inde
  - Bahamian Bounty
    - Pastoral Pursuits
      - Angel's Pursuit
      - Pastoral Player
      - Auld Burns
      - Sagramor
    - Goodricke
    - Breton Rock
    - Anjaal
  - Touch of the Blues
  - Toylsome
  - Donativum
  - Red Cadeaux

== Pedigree ==
Pedigree of Cadeaux Genereux (GB), chestnut stallion, 1985
Sire Young Generation (IRE) 1976	Balidar (GB); 1966	Will Somers	Tudor Minstrel*
Sire Young Generation (IRE) 1976	Balidar (GB); 1966	Will Somers	Queen's Jest
Sire Young Generation (IRE) 1976	Balidar (GB); 1966	Violet Bank	The Phoenix
Sire Young Generation (IRE) 1976	Balidar (GB); 1966	Violet Bank	Leinster
Sire Young Generation (IRE) 1976	Brig o' Doon (IRE); 1967	Shantung	Sicambre
Sire Young Generation (IRE) 1976	Brig o' Doon (IRE); 1967	Shantung	Barleycorn
Sire Young Generation (IRE) 1976	Brig o' Doon (IRE); 1967	Tam o' Shanter	Tamerlane
Sire Young Generation (IRE) 1976	Brig o' Doon (IRE); 1967	Tam o' Shanter	Madam Anna
Dam Smarten Up (GB) 1975	Sharpen Up (GB); 1969	Atan	Native Dancer
Dam Smarten Up (GB) 1975	Sharpen Up (GB); 1969	Atan	Mixed Marriage*
Dam Smarten Up (GB) 1975	Sharpen Up (GB); 1969	Rocchetta	Rockefella
Dam Smarten Up (GB) 1975	Sharpen Up (GB); 1969	Rocchetta	Chambiges
Dam Smarten Up (GB) 1975	Languissola (GB); 1967	Soderini	Crepello
Dam Smarten Up (GB) 1975	Languissola (GB); 1967	Soderini	Matuta
Dam Smarten Up (GB) 1975	Languissola (GB); 1967	Posh	Migoli
Dam Smarten Up (GB) 1975	Languissola (GB); 1967	Posh	Choosey (Family:10-b)

* Cadeaux Genereux is inbred 4S x 5D to the stallion Tudor Minstrel, meaning that he appears fourth generation on the sire side of his pedigree, and fifth generation (via Mixed Marriage) on the dam side of his pedigree.
