= Donativum (horse) =

British-bred Thoroughbred racehorse

- Sire: Cadeaux Genereux
- Grandsire: Young Generation
- Dam: Miss Universe
- Damsire: Warning
- Sex: Gelding
- Foaled: 2 March 2006
- Country: United Kingdom
- Colour: Gray
- Breeder: Stratford Place Stud
- Owner: Princess Haya of Jordan; Godolphin Racing
- Trainer: John Gosden; Saeed bin Suroor
- Record: 13: 4-1-1
- Earnings: £904,928

Major wins
- Tattersalls Timeform Million (2008); Breeders' Cup Juvenile Turf (2008)

Donativum is a British thoroughbred racehorse and winner of the 2008 Breeders' Cup Juvenile Turf.

== Background ==
Donativum was a grey gelding bred in the United Kingdom by the Stratford Place Stud. He was one of the best horses sired by the sprinter Cadeaux Genereux.

As a yearling in October 1997 Donativum (then described as a "chestnut colt") was put up for auction at Tattersalls and bought for 120,000 guineas by John Ferguson Bloodstock on behalf of Sheikh Mohammed.

== Racing career ==
=== 2008: two-year-old season ===
As a juvenile, Donativum was beaten in maiden races on his first two starts and then finished seventh in the Windsor Castle Stakes at Royal Ascot in June. After recording his first victory in a maiden at Yarmouth Racecourse he started a 33/1 outsider for the valuable Timeform Million over seven furlongs at Newmarket on 4 October. Ridden by Martin Dwyer, he finished strongly and won by half a length from Crowded House He was then shipped to California for the Breeders' Cup Juvenile Turf at Santa Anita Racetrack three weeks later. After being restrained toward the rear of the field by Frankie Dettori he made rapid progress in the straight, took the lead in the last fifty yards and won by half a length from the Irish challenger Westphalia.

=== 2009: three-year-old season ===
In 2009 Donativum made seven appearances and ran consistently but appeared some way short of top class. His only success came when he won the Listed Prix de Saint-Patrick over 1600 metres at Deauville Racecourse on 4 July. He also finished third in the Challenge Stakes, fourth in the Joel Stakes and fifth in both the Jersey Stakes and the Prix Quincey.
