= Fly to the Stars =

British-bred Thoroughbred racehorse

- Sire: Bluebird
- Grandsire: Storm Bird
- Dam: Rise and Fall
- Damsire: Mill Reef
- Sex: Stallion
- Foaled: 2 February 1994
- Country: United Kingdom
- Colour: Bay
- Breeder: Bishop's Down Farm
- Owner: Peter Savill; Godolphin
- Trainer: Mark Johnston; Saeed bin Suroor
- Record: 24: 6-5-4
- Earnings: £341,593

Major wins
- Britannia Stakes (1997); Schweppes Golden Mile (1997); Prix Messidor (1998); Prix du Rond Point (1998); Lockinge Stakes (1999)

Fly to the Stars (foaled 2 February 1994) is a British Thoroughbred racehorse and sire best known for his win in the 1999 Lockinge Stakes. He competed in the United Kingdom, Ireland, France, the United Arab Emirates and the United States, winning six of his twenty-four starts in a racing career which lasted from October 1996 to September 2000.

Originally trained by Mark Johnston he showed very good form as a three-year-old in 1997 when he won the Britannia Stakes and the Schweppes Golden Mile as well as being placed in the Leopardstown 2,000 Guineas Trial Stakes and the Topkapi Trophy. In 1998 he raced in the ownership of the Godolphin stable and developed into a top-class miler, winning the Prix Messidor and the Prix du Rond Point as well as finishing second in the Royal Hunt Cup, third in the Dubai Duty Free and fifth in the Breeders' Cup Mile. He recorded his biggest win on his first appearance of 1999 with his win in the Lockinge Stakes. He failed to win in five subsequent starts, several of which saw him being employed as a pacemaker for more highly regarded stablemates.

After his retirement from racing Fly to the Stars stood as a breeding stallion in France, New Zealand and Poland. He has had moderate results as a sire of winners.

== Background ==
Fly to the Stars is a dark bay horse with no white markings bred in England by the Hampshire-based Bishop's Down Farm. As a yearling he was offered for sale at Tattersalls in October 1995 and was bought for 125,000 guineas by the bloodstock agent Charles Gordon-Watson. The colt entered the ownership of Peter Savill and was sent into training with Mark Johnston at Middleham in North Yorkshire.

He was sired by Bluebird, a Kentucky-bred, Irish-trained sprinter who won the King's Stand Stakes in 1987. The best of his other progeny included Lake Coniston, Swallow Flight (Sandown Mile), Dolphin Street (Prix de la Forêt), Twilight Blues (Duke of York Stakes), Bluegrass Prince (Diomed Stakes), Macaw (Elkhorn Stakes), Aube Indienne (Yellow Ribbon Stakes) and Delilah (Park Hill Stakes). Fly to the Stars' dam Rise and Fall showed little racing ability, finishing unplaced in all of her four starts. Her dam Light Duty was a full-sister to the outstanding racehorse and broodmare Highclere.

== Racing career ==
=== 1996: two-year-old season ===
Fly to the Stars began his racing career in a maiden race over six furlongs at Newbury Racecourse on 24 October in which he was ridden by Kevin Darley, Starting at odds of 14/1 he finished third of the twenty-three runners behind the Barry Hills trained Za-Im. On 5 November he started favourite for a maiden over seven furlongs at Redcar Racecourse but was beaten into second place by Tayseer.

=== 1997: three-year-old season ===
On his first run of 1997 Fly to the Stars was ridden by Jason Weaver and started 5/6 favourite for an eight-runner maiden over one mile at Doncaster Racecourse on 20 March and recorded his first win, drawing away from his opponents in the final furlong to win by seven lengths. The colt was then stepped up in class and sent to Ireland for the 2000 Guineas Trial Stakes at Leopardstown Racecourse for which he started favourite but was beaten a short head by the Jim Bolger-trained Lil's Boy. Despite his defeat he was then moved up to Group One class for the Irish 2000 Guineas at the Curragh in May. He led the field into the straight but was outpaced in the closing stages and finished fifth of the six runners behind Desert King.

Fly to the Stars was then dropped in class and stepped up in distance for a ten furlong handicap race at Epsom Racecourse and finished fourth to Jaunty Jack under top weight of 133 pounds. On 17 June the colt was one of twenty-eight three-year-olds to contest the Britannia Handicap over one mile at Royal Ascot. Ridden as on his previous appearance by Olivier Peslier he carried 129 pounds and started at odds of 20/1. After racing behind the leaders he began to make progress in the last quarter mile, took the lead a furlong out and "ran on well" to win by one and a half lengths from the Michael Stoute-trained gelding Komi. He was then matched against older handicappers at Sandown Park Racecourse on 16 July and ran poorly, finishing sixteenth of the eighteen runners behind the four-year-old gelding Hawksley Hill. Fifteen days after his disappointing effort at Sandown, Fly to the Stars carried 132 pounds and started at odds of 12/1 for the valuable Schweppes Golden Mile Handicap at Goodwood Racecourse. Peslier positioned Fly to the Stars from the start before sending the colt into the lead inside the final furlong to win by one and a quarter lengths from Crumpton Hill and eighteen others.

In August Fly to the Stars was sent to France and moved back up to Listed level for the Prix de Tourgeville at Deauville Racecourse and finished second to the Criquette Head-Maarek-trained Marathon. The colt ended his season with a trip to Turkey for a run in the Topkapi Trophy over 1600 metres at Veliefendi Race Course on 13 September. After taking the lead 500 metres out he was overtaken in the straight and finished third behind his fellow British challengers Sandstone and Ramooz.

At the end of the season he was bought privately by Sheikh Mohammed's Godolphin organisation and was moved to the training stable of Saeed bin Suroor.

=== 1998: four-year-old season ===
Having spent the winter with the Godolphin stable in Dubai, Fly to the Stars began his third season with three races at Nad Al Sheba Racecourse. Racing on dirt, he finished second to Wathik in the first round of the Al Maktoum Challenge in January and third behind the same horse in the third round of the series in February. On Dubai World Cup Night on 28 March he contested the Dubai Duty Free over 2000 metres and finished third behind Annus Mirabilis and Intikhab.

In June, on his return to European turf racing Fly to the Stars was assigned a weight of 137 pounds for the Royal Hunt Cup and started the 6/1 favourite in a thirty-two-runner field. Ridden by Frankie Dettori, he finished one and a half lengths second to Refuse To Lose, a horse to whom he was conceding twenty-eight pounds. Daragh O'Donohoe took over the ride when Fly to the Stars ran in the Group Three Prix Messidor at Deauville on 12 July and started second favourite behind the André Fabre-trained five-year-old Alamo Bay. After leading from the start he was headed by Jim And Tonic 200 metres out but rallied in the closing stages to regain the advantage and win by a head.

After a break of three months the colt returned in the Group Two Prix du Rond Point over 1600 metres at Longchamp Racecourse in October when he was reunited with Dettori and started second favourite behind Gold Away (runner-up in the Prix Jean Prat and Prix du Moulin). The other runners included Silic, Decorated Hero (winner of the race in 1997) and Ramooz. Fly to the Stars led from the start, accelerated clear of the field in the last 400 metres and won by two and a half lengths from Gold Away. On his final appearance of the season, the colt was sent to the United States for the Breeders' Cup Mile at Churchill Downs on 7 November and ran fifth behind Da Hoss, with Favorite Trick, Cape Cross, Among Men and Desert Prince finishing further back in the field.

=== 1999: five-year-old season ===
Fly to the Stars began his 1999 campaign in the Group One Lockinge Stakes over one mile at Newbury on 15 May. With Richard Hills partnering the Godolphin stable's first string Intikhab (the 4/7 favourite) the ride on Fly to the Stars (9/1) went to the Irish jockey Willie Supple. The other four runners were Jim And Tonic, Almushtarak (Sandown Mile), Tomba (Prix de la Forêt) and Duck Row (third in the St James's Palace Stakes). Racing on soft ground Fly to the Stars took the lead from the start and stayed on "gamely" under pressure in the closing stages to win by a lengths and a half from Jim And Tonic with Almushtarak a neck away in third place.

In two subsequent starts that year, Fly to the Stars failed to reproduce his Newbury form when tried on firmer ground. At Royal Ascot in June he started second favourite for the Queen Anne Stakes but faded badly in the last quarter mile and finished seventh of the eight runners, more than twenty lengths behind the winner Cape Cross. At Longchamp in September he set the pace for his stablemate Aljabr in the Prix du Moulin before finishing eighth behind Sendawar.

=== 2000: six-year-old season ===
Fly to the Stars remained in training as a six-year-old but failed to win or place in three races. He began his season by running for the second time in the Dubai Duty Free and set the pace before finishing seventh to his stablemate Rhythm Band. On his European seasonal debut he contested the Group Three Diomed Stakes at Epsom Racecourse but after losing a shoe early in the race he finished last of the five runners behind Trans Island. On his final appearance he acted as a pacemaker for Diktat in the Prix du Moulin and led for most of the way before finishing fourth of the eight runners behind Indian Lodge.

== Stud record ==
At the end of his racing career, Fly to the Stars became a breeding stallion for his owners Darley Stud. He began his stud career at the Haras du Logis in France, and was also "shuttled" to stand at the Ashwell Farm in Cambridge, New Zealand. He was later exported to stand in Poland. The best of his offspring have included th Listed winner Salsalavie and the steeplechaser Cafe de Paris.

== Pedigree ==
Pedigree of Fly to the Stars (GB), bay stallion, 1994
Sire Bluebird (USA) 1984	Storm Bird (CAN); 1978	Northern Dancer	Nearctic
Sire Bluebird (USA) 1984	Storm Bird (CAN); 1978	Northern Dancer	Natalma
Sire Bluebird (USA) 1984	Storm Bird (CAN); 1978	South Ocean	New Providence
Sire Bluebird (USA) 1984	Storm Bird (CAN); 1978	South Ocean	Shining Sun
Sire Bluebird (USA) 1984	Ivory Dawn (USA); 1978	Sir Ivor	Sir Gaylord
Sire Bluebird (USA) 1984	Ivory Dawn (USA); 1978	Sir Ivor	Attica
Sire Bluebird (USA) 1984	Ivory Dawn (USA); 1978	Dusky Evening	Tim Tam
Sire Bluebird (USA) 1984	Ivory Dawn (USA); 1978	Dusky Evening	Home By Dark
Dam Rise and Fall (GB) 1984	Mill Reef (USA); 1968	Never Bend	Nasrullah
Dam Rise and Fall (GB) 1984	Mill Reef (USA); 1968	Never Bend	Lalun
Dam Rise and Fall (GB) 1984	Mill Reef (USA); 1968	Milan Mill	Princequillo
Dam Rise and Fall (GB) 1984	Mill Reef (USA); 1968	Milan Mill	Virginia Water
Dam Rise and Fall (GB) 1984	Light Duty (GB); 1972	Queen's Hussar	March Past
Dam Rise and Fall (GB) 1984	Light Duty (GB); 1972	Queen's Hussar	Jojo
Dam Rise and Fall (GB) 1984	Light Duty (GB); 1972	Highlight	Borealis
Dam Rise and Fall (GB) 1984	Light Duty (GB); 1972	Highlight	Hypericum (Family: 2-f)
