= Prix Messidor =

- Class: Group 3
- Location: Maisons-Laffitte; France
- Inaugurated: 1949
- Race type: Flat / Thoroughbred
- Website: france-galop.com

Race information
- Distance: 1,600 metres (1 mile)
- Surface: Turf
- Track: Straight
- Qualification: Three-years-old and up
- Weight: 53½ kg (3y); 57½ kg (4y+); Allowances; 1½ kg for fillies and mares Penalties; 4 kg for Group 1 winners * 4 kg if two Group 2 wins * 3 kg if one Group 2 win * 3 kg if two Group 3 wins * 2 kg if one Group 3 win * * since January 1
- Purse: €80,000 (2016); 1st: €40,000

Prix Messidor
2025
Quddwah	Geography	Ridari

Previous years
2024
Caramelito	Marhaba Ya Sanafi	Andromede
2023
Fast Raaj	Topgear	Ancient Rome
2022
Wally	Longvillers	Axdavali
2021
Victor Ludorum	Brentford Hope	Kenway

2020-2011
2019
Impulsif	Trais Fluors	Study Of Man
2018
Geniale	Jimmy Two Times	Zalamea
2017
Taareef	Al Wukair	Attendu
2016
Vadamos	Mr Owen	Territories
2015
Fractional	Faufiler	Bookrunner
2014
Graphic	Pilote	Line Drummer
2013
Intello	Mainsail	Don Bosco
2012
Tin Horse	Prince D'Alienor	Moonwalk In Paris
2011
Vagabond Shoes	Biondetti	Polytechnicien

2010-2001
2010
Fuisse	Beacon Lodge	Silver Frost
2009
Alnadana	Mr Brock	Putney Bridge
2008
Racinger	Spirito Del Vento	Chopastair
2007
Stormy River	Satri	Multiplex
2006
Librettist	Helios Quercus	Manduro
2005
Valixir	Special Kaldoun	Salselon
2004
Ryono	Diamond Green	Special Kaldoun
2003
Special Kaldoun	Tashkandi	Bernebeau
2002
Altieri	Domedriver	Proudwings
2001
Panis	Duck Row	Mocham Glen

2000-1990
2000
Faberger	Chelsea Manor	Kingsalsa
1999
Dansili	Kabool	Miss Berbere
1998
Fly To The Stars	Jim And Tonic	Orford Ness
1997
Neuilly	Simon Du Desert	Polar Prince
1996
Grey Risk	Nec Plus Ultra	Royal Philosopher
1995
Nec Plus Ultra	Bishop Of Cashel	Tellurium
1994
Jeune Homme	Fadeyev	Enjoy Plan
1993
Fanmore	Caesour	Zabar
1992
Take Risks	Metal Storm	Crystal Path
1991
Acteur Francais	Boxing Day	Ganges
1990
Septieme Ciel	River Of Light	Ocean Falls

The Prix Messidor is a Group 3 flat horse race in France open to thoroughbreds aged three years or older. It is run at Maisons-Laffitte over a distance of 1,600 metres (about 1 mile), and it is scheduled to take place each year in July.

== History ==
The event was established in 1949, and it was originally held at Saint-Cloud. It was initially called the Prix de Messidor, a name derived from messis, the Latin word for "harvest". The present title, without the "de", was introduced in 1955.

For a period the race was switched between Maisons-Laffitte (1963–65, 1968–69) and Saint-Cloud (1966–67, 1970–72). It began a longer spell at Maisons-Laffitte in 1973.

The race was transferred to Deauville in 1997. It returned to Maisons-Laffitte in 2005.

== Records ==
Most successful horse (2 wins):

- Catilina – 1962, 1963

Leading jockey (6 wins):

- Yves Saint-Martin – Catilina (1962, 1963), Cripton (1964), Irish Minstrel (1969), Tassmoun (1980), Ya Zaman (1981)

Leading trainer (13 wins):

- André Fabre – Mille Balles (1984), Fitzwilliam Place (1987), Mill Native (1988), Polish Precedent (1989), Acteur Francais (1991), Fanmore (1993), Neuilly (1997), Dansili (1999), Valixir (2005), Intello (2013), Fractional (2015), Vadamos (2016), Impulsif (2019)

Leading owner (4 wins):

- Aga Khan IV – Cripton (1964), Tassmoun (1980), Valixir (2005), Alnadana (2009)

== Winners since 1978 ==
Year	Winner	Age	Jockey	Trainer	Owner	Time
1978	Cosmopolitan	3	Philippe Paquet	François Boutin	Robert Jolibois
1979	American Prince	3	Willie Carson	Stuart Murless	Burt Bacharach
1980	Tassmoun	4	Yves Saint-Martin	François Mathet	Aga Khan IV
1981	Ya Zaman	4	Yves Saint-Martin	Mitri Saliba	Mahmoud Fustok	1:36.20
1982	Noalcoholic	5	George Duffield	Gavin Pritchard-Gordon	William du Pont III
1983	Pampabird	4	Maurice Philipperon	John Cunnington Jr.	Paul de Moussac	1:35.20
1984	Mille Balles	4	Freddy Head	André Fabre	Enzo di Nella	1:37.30
1985	Comrade in Arms	3	Alfred Gibert	Philippe Lallié	D. W. Molins	1:36.10
1986	Gay Minstrel	5	Gary W. Moore	Criquette Head	Jacques Wertheimer	1:37.00
1987	Fitzwilliam Place	3	Dominique Boeuf	André Fabre	Bruce McNall	1:34.50
1988	Mill Native	4	Cash Asmussen	André Fabre	Paul de Moussac	1:34.20
1989	Polish Precedent	3	Cash Asmussen	André Fabre	Sheikh Mohammed	1:36.30
1990	Septieme Ciel	3	Freddy Head	Criquette Head	Johnny Jones	1:41.30
1991	Acteur Francais	3	Thierry Jarnet	André Fabre	Paul de Moussac	1:36.08
1992	Take Risks	3	Mathieu Boutin	Jean Lesbordes	David Tsui	1:41.00
1993	Fanmore	5	Thierry Jarnet	André Fabre	Khalid Abdullah	1:36.30
1994	Jeune Homme	4	Cash Asmussen	François Boutin	Yoshio Asakawa	1:39.10
1995	Nec Plus Ultra	4	Thierry Gillet	Alain de Royer-Dupré	Marquesa de Moratalla	1:36.50
1996	Grey Risk	3	Sylvain Guillot	Philippe Demercastel	Ecurie Bader	1:40.50
1997	Neuilly	3	Alain Junk	André Fabre	Mrs Paul de Moussac	1:37.10
1998	Fly to the Stars	4	Daragh O'Donohoe	Saeed bin Suroor	Godolphin	1:36.60
1999	Dansili	3	Olivier Peslier	André Fabre	Khalid Abdullah	1:33.70
2000	Faberger	4	L. Hammer-Hansen	Erika Mäder	Wiesenhof Bloodstock	1:39.50
2001	Panis	3	Thierry Thulliez	Pascal Bary	Ecurie J. L. Bouchard	1:38.40
2002	Altieri	4	Gabriele Bietolini	Vittorio Caruso	Scuderia Incolinx	1:40.30
2003	Special Kaldoun	4	Dominique Boeuf	David Smaga	Ecurie Chalhoub	1:34.60
2004	Ryono	5	Tony Castanheira	Peter Lautner	Hildegard Focke	1:39.60
2005	Valixir	4	Christophe Soumillon	André Fabre	Aga Khan IV	1:35.70
2006	Librettist	4	Frankie Dettori	Saeed bin Suroor	Godolphin	1:36.00
2007	Stormy River	4	Thierry Thulliez	Nicolas Clément	Ecurie Mister Ess A S	1:33.90
2008	Racinger	5	Davy Bonilla	Freddy Head	Hamdan Al Maktoum	1:35.70
2009	Alnadana	4	Christophe Soumillon	Alain de Royer-Dupré	Aga Khan IV	1:38.70
2010	Fuisse	4	Stéphane Pasquier	Criquette Head-Maarek	Haras du Quesnay	1:35.30
2011	Vagabond Shoes	4	Christophe Soumillon	Yan Durepaire	Javier Martinez Salmean	1:39.50
2012	Tin Horse	4	Thierry Jarnet	Didier Guillemin	Marquesa de Moratalla	1:35.45
2013	Intello	3	Olivier Peslier	André Fabre	Wertheimer et Frère	1:34.00
2014	Graphic	5	Frankie Dettori	William Haggas	Royal Ascot Racing Club	1:38.10
2015	Fractional	6	Mickael Barzalona	André Fabre	Godolphin	1:38.40
2016	Vadamos	5	Vincent Cheminaud	André Fabre	Haras de Saint Pair	1:35.10
2017	Taareef	4	Ioritz Mendizabal	Jean-Claude Rouget	Hamdan Al Maktoum	1:34.86
2018	Geniale	4	Yutaka Take	Mikio Matsunaga	Kieffers Co Ltd	1:37.62
2019	Impulsif ^{[a]}	4	Mickael Barzalona	André Fabre	Godolphin	1:38.80
2020	Not run due to the COVID-19 pandemic.
2021	Victor Ludorum ^{[b]}	4	Mickael Barzalona	André Fabre	Godolphin	1:40.02
2022	Wally ^{[c]}	5	Cristian Demuro	Jean-Claude Rouget	Ecurie Jean-Pierre Barjon	1:39.37
2023	Fast Raaj ^{[d]}	5	Alexis Pouchin	Yann Barberot	Alain Jathiere, Ecurie Du Parc Monceau Et Al	1:36.81
2026	Silius	4	Maxime Guyon	Christophe Ferland	Wertheimer et Frère	1:36:01

^{a} The 2019 running moved to Deauville during unsafely track.
^{b} The 2021 running moved to Chantilly due to the closure of Maisons-Laffitte.
^{c} The 2022 running moved to Chantilly due to the closure of Maisons-Laffitte
^{d} The 2023 running moved to Chantilly due to the closure of Maisons-Laffitte.

== Earlier winners ==
- 1949: Beverly
- 1950: Philactis
- 1951:
- 1952: no race
- 1953: Pomare
- 1954: Phlox
- 1955: Chargeur
- 1956: Cigalon
- 1957–59: no race
- 1960: Fin Bec
- 1961: Pen Mane
- 1962: Catilina
- 1963: Catilina
- 1964: Cripton
- 1965: Red Slipper
- 1966: Agy
- 1967: Morris Dancer
- 1968: Fisc
- 1969: Irish Minstrel
- 1970: Brabant
- 1971: Joshua
- 1972: Arosa
- 1973: Martinmas
- 1974: El Toro
- 1975: Son of Silver
- 1976: Dona Barod
- 1977: Malecite

== See also ==
- List of French flat horse races
- Recurring sporting events established in 1949 – this race is included under its original title, Prix de Messidor.
