= Bahamian Bounty =

British-bred Thoroughbred racehorse (1994-2020)

- Sire: Cadeaux Genereux
- Grandsire: Young Generation
- Dam: Clarentia
- Damsire: Ballad Rock
- Sex: Stallion
- Foaled: 10 February 1994
- Died: 2 March 2020
- Country: United Kingdom
- Colour: Chestnut
- Breeder: Clarents Racing Ltd
- Owner: Lucayan Stud; Godolphin
- Trainer: David Loder; Saeed bin Suroor
- Record: 7: 3-1-0
- Earnings: £204,981

Major wins
- Prix Morny (1996); Middle Park Stakes (1996)

Awards
- European Champion Two-Year-Old Colt
- Last updated on August 25, 2007

Bahamian Bounty (10 February 1994 – 2 March 2020) was a British Thoroughbred racehorse and sire. He was named European Champion Two-Year-Old Colt at the 1996 Cartier Racing Awards. In his championship season, Bahamian Bounty won three of his five races including two Group One races, the Prix Morny in France and the Middle Park Stakes in England. He was retired after two unsuccessful starts in 1997 and later stood as a stallion at the National Stud at Newmarket, Suffolk.

== Background ==
Bahamian Bounty was bred in the United Kingdom by Clarents Racing Ltd. His sire, Cadeaux Genereux won several major sprint races including the Nunthorpe Stakes and the July Cup. At stud he sired over 1,000 winners including Touch of the Blues (Atto Mile), Bijou d'Inde (St James's Palace Stakes) and Toylsome (Prix de la Forêt). Bahamian Bounty's dam, Clarentia was a sprinter who won three races, all over the minimum distance of five furlongs.

Bahamian Bounty was sold as a yearling for 45,000 gns to the Lucayan Stud, the name used for the horse racing interests of Edward St. George. St. George was a British businessman who lived in The Bahamas and gave the "Bahamian" prefix to the names of many of his racehorses including Bahamian Pirate (Nunthorpe Stakes) and Bahamian Knight (Derby Italiano).

Bahamian Bounty was originally sent into training with David Loder at Newmarket. In October 1996 he was bought privately by Sheikh Mohammed for his Godolphin organisation for a reported fee of £1 million. At the end of the season he was moved to the stable of Saeed bin Suroor, spending the winter in Dubai before returning to Britain in spring 1997. He was ridden in five of his seven starts by Frankie Dettori.

== Racing career ==
=== 1996: two-year-old season ===
Bahamian Bounty made his racecourse debut in July in a six-furlong maiden race at Newmarket. he raced prominently and briefly led a furlong from the finish before being beaten a neck by Grapeshot. Twelve days later he was dropped down in trip for a five-furlong maiden race at Yarmouth, for which he started at the unusual odds of 1/11. As the betting suggested, he proved far too good for his four opponents, going clear in the final quarter mile and winning by two and a half lengths in a "canter".

In August, Bahamian Bounty was moved directly to Group One level for the Prix Morny at Deauville. Although only five horses took part, they included the odds-on favourite Zamindar (an unbeaten brother of Zafonic), the July Stakes winner Rich Ground and the year's outstanding filly Pas de Reponse. Bahamian Bounty and Zamindar disputed the lead from the start and raced together throughout the closing stages, with the English-trained colt prevailing by a short neck. After the race Loder called him "a lovely horse with a tremendous temperament" and the bookmakers offered him at 16/1 for the following year's 2000 Guineas, although his pedigree suggested that he would be most likely to make an impact as a sprinter.

The six-furlong Middle Park Stakes at Newmarket in October saw Bahamian Bounty sent off the 7/4 favourite ahead of ten rivals including Easycall (Richmond Stakes), Rich Ground, Muchea (Zukunfts-Rennen) and Deep Finesse (Prix du Bois). Dettori held the colt up in the early stages but then had problems finding space for a challenge in the final quarter mile. When a gap appeared Bahamian Bounty "flashed" through to settle the race "in a matter of strides". He idled after hitting the front and had to be driven out to beat Muchea by a head. After the race Dettori praised the colt's "terrific turn of foot."

On his final start of the season, Bahamian Bounty attempted to become the first Middle Park winner to add the seven-furlong Dewhurst Stakes since Diesis in 1982. As in the Middle Park Stakes, Bahamian Bounty had trouble finding a clear run after being held up. On this occasion, however, he could not reach the leaders and finished fourth to In Command, beaten less than two lengths.

=== 1997: three-year-old season ===
Bahamian Bounty spent the winter in Dubai before returning to England with the rest of the Godolphin team in late April. Running for his new stable, Bahamian Bounty failed to reproduce his best form in two starts as a three-year-old. At Longchamp he was made 11/10 joint favourite for the Poule d'Essai des Poulains, but after leading in the middle part of the race he faded badly to finish last of the six runners behind Daylami. Two months later he returned to a sprint distance in the July Cup at Newmarket where he finished fourth of the nine runners behind the 50/1 outsider Compton Place.

== Assessment ==
In November 1996, Bahamian Bounty was named European Champion Two-Year-Old Colt at the Cartier Racing Awards, although the situation was somewhat confused, with the Grand Critérium winner Revoque being given the title of Champion Two-Year-Old. Bahamian Bounty was also rated behind Revoque in the official International Classification.

== Stud career ==
After retiring to the National Stud, Bahamian Bounty proved to be a successful stallion, siring the winners of more than five hundred races. As might have been predicted from his pedigree and racing career, he proved particularly effective as a sire of two-year-old and sprinters, his best winners being the full brothers Pastoral Pursuits (July Cup) and Goodricke (Haydock Sprint Cup). He was also "shuttled" to stand at the Eliza Park Stud in Australia. In 2011 he stood at a fee of £10,000. Bahamian Bounty was retired from stud duties in 2015 and died on 2 March 2020 at the age of 26.

== Sire line tree ==
- Bahamian Bounty
  - Pastoral Pursuits
    - Angel's Pursuit
    - Pastoral Player
    - Auld Burns
    - Sagramor
  - Goodricke
  - Breton Rock
  - Anjaal

== Pedigree ==
Pedigree of Bahamian Bounty (GB), chestnut stallion, 1994
Sire Cadeaux Genereux (GB) 1985	Young Generation; 1976	Balidar	Will Somers
Sire Cadeaux Genereux (GB) 1985	Young Generation; 1976	Balidar	Violet Bank
Sire Cadeaux Genereux (GB) 1985	Young Generation; 1976	Brig O’Doon	Shantung
Sire Cadeaux Genereux (GB) 1985	Young Generation; 1976	Brig O’Doon	Tam O’Shanter
Sire Cadeaux Genereux (GB) 1985	Smarten Up; 1975	Sharpen Up	Atan
Sire Cadeaux Genereux (GB) 1985	Smarten Up; 1975	Sharpen Up	Rocchetta
Sire Cadeaux Genereux (GB) 1985	Smarten Up; 1975	Languissola	Soderini
Sire Cadeaux Genereux (GB) 1985	Smarten Up; 1975	Languissola	Posh
Dam Clarentia (Ire) 1984	Ballad Rock; 1974	Bold Lad	Bold Ruler*
Dam Clarentia (Ire) 1984	Ballad Rock; 1974	Bold Lad	Barn Pride
Dam Clarentia (Ire) 1984	Ballad Rock; 1974	True Rocket	Roan Rocket
Dam Clarentia (Ire) 1984	Ballad Rock; 1974	True Rocket	True Course
Dam Clarentia (Ire) 1984	Laharden; 1979	Mount Hagen	Bold Bidder*
Dam Clarentia (Ire) 1984	Laharden; 1979	Mount Hagen	Moonmadness
Dam Clarentia (Ire) 1984	Laharden; 1979	Sinella	Sing Sing
Dam Clarentia (Ire) 1984	Laharden; 1979	Sinella	Djerella (Family: 3-h)

* Bahamian Bounty is inbred 4D x 5D to the stallion Bold Ruler, meaning that he appears fourth generation and fifth generation (via Bold Bidder) on the dam side of his pedigree.
