= Revoque =

Irish-bred Thoroughbred racehorse

- Sire: Fairy King
- Grandsire: Northern Dancer
- Dam: La Bella Fontana
- Damsire: Lafontaine
- Sex: Stallion
- Foaled: 21 January 1994
- Country: Ireland
- Colour: Chestnut
- Breeder: Minch Bloodstock
- Owner: Robert Sangster
- Trainer: Peter Chapple-Hyam
- Record: 10: 5-2-0
- Earnings: £276,277

Major wins
- Acomb Stakes (1996); Prix de la Salamandre (1996); Grand Critérium (1996)

Awards
- European Champion Two-Year-Old (1996)
- Last updated on August 25, 2007

Revoque was a Thoroughbred racehorse and sire. He was named European Champion Two Year Old at the Cartier Racing Awards and was officially rated the best two-year-old of 1996 by the International Classification. In his championship season Revoque was unbeaten in four starts including the Group One Prix de la Salamandre and the Group One Grand Critérium. He was retired after winning once from six starts as a three-year-old. He stood as a stallion in Hampshire.

== Background ==
Revoque, a "huge" bay horse, standing 16.2 hands high, was bred in Ireland by the County Cork based Minch Bloodstock. His sire Fairy King, a full brother to Sadler's Wells, sired the winners of over five-hundred races, including Helissio (Prix de l'Arc de Triomphe), Falbrav and Oath (Derby). His dam La Bella Fontana, a daughter of the Cumberland Lodge Stakes winner Lafontaine, also produced the Prix Eugène Adam winner King of Tara.

Revoque was sent to the Tattersalls November sales as a weanling in 1994. He was bought for 36,000 gns by the bloodstock agent Dermot "Demi" O'Byrne on behalf of Robert Sangster. The intention was to sell the horse on at a profit as a yearling (a practice known as "pinhooking"), but Revoque grew so quickly that Sangster decided that he was "too big and boat-like" to attract bidders. He was therefore kept to race in Sangster's own colours and was sent into training with Peter Chapple-Hyam at Manton, Wiltshire. He was ridden in all his races by John Reid

== Racing career ==
=== 1996: two-year-old season ===
Revoque made his debut in a maiden race at Ascot in July. Sent off the 7/2 second favourite he raced prominently before being moved into the lead inside the final furlong and running on strongly to win by half a length from Shii-Take. In August he was sent to York for the Acomb Stakes (now a Group Three race), for which he was made second favourite behind the odds-on In Command. Reid tracked the leaders on Revoque, before moving the colt into the lead a furlong from the finish. Revoque pulled away to win by two and a half lengths from Symonds Inn. The form of the race was later boosted when In Command, who finished third, won the Group One Dewhurst Stakes at Newmarket in October.

Revoque was then moved up to Group One level to contest the Prix de la Salamandre at Longchamp in September, after a plan to run him in the Champagne Stakes was abandoned due to the unsuitably firm ground. In the Longchamp race he was held up by Reid in the early stages before making his challenge in the straight. Revoque accelerated into the lead and pulled away to win by three lengths from The West, with the odds-on favourite Zamindar in third. Immediately after the race he was offered at odds of 10/1 for the following year's 2000 Guineas. A month later, Revoque returned to Longchamp and was made odds-on favourite for the Grand Critérium. After seeming to be struggling early in the straight he stayed on strongly to take the lead inside the final furlong and win by two lengths from Majorien. After the race Chapple-Hyam praised the colt as "the best two-year-old in Europe" and added that "once this horse gets into gear it's all over". The bookmakers reacted by cutting his odds for the 2000 Guineas to 7/1.

=== 1997: three-year-old season ===
Before the start of the 1997 season Revoque was a supplementary entry for The Derby (he had not originally been entered the race) but he was first aimed at the 2000 Guineas. He made his debut in a recognised Guineas trial race, the Greenham Stakes at Newbury. He started favourite, but in a closely contested finish he was beaten a head by Yalaietanee, losing his unbeaten record. Despite his defeat, his connections were happy with his performance, and Revoque was sent off 100/30 favourite in the 2000 Guineas three weeks later. He broke slowly and was towards the back of the field in the early running. As the race entered the closing stages, Revoque was trapped behind horses and Reid had to switch him to the outside to find a clear run. He then made rapid progress in the last two furlongs of the race to finish second, beaten three quarters of a length by Entrepreneur Some observers considered him a rather unlucky loser.

Revoque was expected to be a major contender for The Derby and looked impressive in training gallops. At The Curragh at the end of May however, he ran his first disappointing race, finishing sixth, beaten ten lengths by Desert King when favourite for the Irish 2,000 Guineas. Revoque had looked the likely winner in the straight but faded badly in the closing stages. The performance was explained when the colt was revealed to have been suffering from a viral infection which affected many of the horses in Chapple-Hyam's stable.

The effects of the virus, and a recurring problem with lameness meant that Revoque was off the course for almost four months before reappearing in a minor stakes race at Doncaster in September. His two rivals included Bahhare, a colt who had once been favourite for the 2000 Guineas and had been ranked second to Revoque in the International Classification. Revoque raced in second before moving through easily to take the lead and winning "readily" by one and a half lengths. On his last two starts, Revoque failed to recapture his best form, running unplaced in the Queen Elizabeth II Stakes and the Champion Stakes.

== Assessment ==
At the Cartier Racing Awards in November 1996, Revoque was named European Champion Two-Year-Old. The situation was somewhat confused, as a separate award for Champion Two-Year-Old Colt was given to Bahamian Bounty. In January 1997 the official International Classification ranked Revoque as the best two-year-old of the 1996 season.

Timeform rated Revoque at 122 as a two-year-old and 124 as a three-year-old.

== Stud career ==
Revoque was retired to stand at the Morristown Lattin Stud in County Kildare, Ireland at an initial fee of £7,500. In 1999 he was shuttled to the Eliza Park Stud in Australia for the Southern Hemisphere breeding season. Revoque stood at the Rathbarry Stud, in County Cork from 2004 to 2006 and was then moved to his current base at the Yorton Farm Stud in Shropshire where he stands at a fee of £1,500.

Revoque has sired the winners of more than 200 races but none at the highest level. The best of his offspring has been Rebel Rebel, who finished second in the 2000 Guineas and won the Poker Handicap at Belmont Park.

== Pedigree ==
Pedigree of Revoque (Ire), bay stallion, 1994
Sire Fairy King (GB) 1982	Northern Dancer; 1961	Nearctic	Nearco
Sire Fairy King (GB) 1982	Northern Dancer; 1961	Nearctic	Lady Angela
Sire Fairy King (GB) 1982	Northern Dancer; 1961	Natalma	Native Dancer
Sire Fairy King (GB) 1982	Northern Dancer; 1961	Natalma	Almahmoud
Sire Fairy King (GB) 1982	Fairy Bridge; 1975	Bold Reason	Hail To Reason
Sire Fairy King (GB) 1982	Fairy Bridge; 1975	Bold Reason	Lalun
Sire Fairy King (GB) 1982	Fairy Bridge; 1975	Special	Forli
Sire Fairy King (GB) 1982	Fairy Bridge; 1975	Special	Thong
Dam La Bella Fontana (GB) 1985	Lafontaine; 1977	Sham	Pretense
Dam La Bella Fontana (GB) 1985	Lafontaine; 1977	Sham	Sequoia
Dam La Bella Fontana (GB) 1985	Lafontaine; 1977	Valya	Vandale
Dam La Bella Fontana (GB) 1985	Lafontaine; 1977	Valya	Lilya
Dam La Bella Fontana (GB) 1985	Sorebelle; 1974	Prince Tenderfoot	Blue Prince
Dam La Bella Fontana (GB) 1985	Sorebelle; 1974	Prince Tenderfoot	La Tendresse
Dam La Bella Fontana (GB) 1985	Sorebelle; 1974	La Belle	Vilmorin
Dam La Bella Fontana (GB) 1985	Sorebelle; 1974	La Belle	Kentucky Belle (Family: 14-c)
