= Bluebird (horse) =

American-bred Thoroughbred racehorse

- Sire: Storm Bird
- Grandsire: Northern Dancer
- Dam: Ivory Dawn
- Damsire: Sir Ivor
- Sex: Stallion
- Foaled: 2 April 1984
- Country: United States
- Colour: Bay
- Breeder: Seitz-Waldman Partnership
- Owner: Robert Sangster
- Trainer: Vincent O'Brien
- Record: 9: 4–1–2

Major wins
- Ballyogan Stakes (1987); King's Stand Stakes (1987)

Awards
- Timeform rating 107 (1986), 125 (1987)

Bluebird (2 April 1984 – 14 May 2005) was an American-bred, Irish-trained thoroughbred racehorse and sire. He fetched $1.1 million as a yearling and spent his racing career in Europe. He showed promise as a juvenile in Ireland in 1986 when he won on his debut and finished third in his only other race that year. In the following spring, he finished second in the Leopardstown 2,000 Guineas Trial Stakes before being dropped to sprint distances to win the Ballyogan Stakes and subsequently recording an emphatic victory in the Group One King's Stand Stakes. He failed to win in three subsequent starts and was retired at the end of the season. He later stood as a breeding stallion in Ireland and Australia and had considerable success as a sire of winners.

== Background ==
Bluebird was a "lengthy, useful-looking" bay horse with a white star and three white socks and bred in Kentucky by the Seitz-Waldman Partnership. As a yearling, the colt was offered for sale at Keeneland and was bought for US$1,100,000 (equivalent to about $3,300,000 in 2025) by BBA Ireland on behalf of Robert Sangster and the Coolmore Stud. He was sent to race in Europe where he was trained throughout his racing career by Vincent O'Brien at Ballydoyle.

Bluebird was from the second crop of foals sired by the Canadian-bred Storm Bird, who was the top-rated two-year-old in Europe in 1980. As a breeding stallion in Kentucky, he also sired Summer Squall, Storm Cat, Indian Skimmer and Balanchine. Bluebird's dame Ivory Dawn was an unraced daughter of Sir Ivor. She was a descendant of the American broodmare Sunday Evening who was the female-line ancestor of several major winners including Henrythenavigator, Indian Skimmer, Saffron Walden, Java Gold and Dark Mirage.

== Racing career ==
=== 1986: two-year-old season ===
Bluebird began his racing career in a five furlong maiden race at Phoenix Park Racecourse in October in which he started odds-on favourite and won by one and a half lengths from the filly White Water Lady. Later in the month, he was moved up in class and distance for the Leopardstown Stakes over seven furlongs at Leopardstown Racecourse. He took the lead approaching the final furlong but was overtaken in the closing stages and was beaten into third place by Antic Boy and the British challenger Mulhollande.

=== 1987: three-year-old season ===
Bluebird began his second season in April when contested the Leopardstown 2,000 Guineas Trial Stakes over seven furlongs in April and was beaten a short had into second by the Kevin Prendergast-trained Island Reef. In May, the colt was dropped back to six furlongs for the BBA Sprint Stakes at Phoenix Park and won "comfortably" by two lengths from the British-trained Powder Keg and eight others. In early June, he was stepped up in class for the Group Three Ballyogan Stakes over five furlongs at Leopardstown and won by half a length from the filly Flawless Image.

Bluebird was then sent to England for the Group One King's Stand Stakes over five furlongs at Royal Ascot and started the 7/2 third favourite behind Gayane (winner of the Sirenia Stakes and the Sandy Lane Stakes) and Hallgate (Diadem Stakes, Palace House Stakes). The other nine runners included Flawless Image, Governor General (Abernant Stakes), Singing Steven (Cornwallis Stakes) and Carol's Treasure (Windsor Castle Stakes). Ridden by Cash Asmussen, he joined the leaders two furlongs out and drew right away in the closing stages to win by four lengths from the 25/1 shot Perion with the outsiders Orient and Sharp Romance in third and fourth. Timeform called his victory "as impressive a sprinting performance as seen all season."

On his three subsequent starts, Bluebird failed to run up to his Ascot form. At Newmarket Racecourse, he started odds-on favourite for the July Cup but started slowly before staying on in the closing stages to finish third behind Ajdal and Gayane. After performing lazily in training gallops, he was equipped with blinkers for his run in the William Hill Sprint Championship at York Racecourse in August. He refused to co-operate with Asmussen and dropped to the rear of the field before making some progress in the final furlong to finish fourth behind Ajdal. On his final appearance, the colt was sent to France for the Prix de la Forêt over 1400 metres at Longchamp Racecourse on October 25. He made little impact as he finished ninth out of the fourteen runners, behind Soviet Star.

== Assessment ==
In 1986, the independent Timeform organisation gave him a rating of 107 (25 pounds below their top two-year-old Reference Point) and described him in their annual Racehorses of 1986 as a being likely to stay a mile and win more races. In the official classification of two-year-olds in Ireland, he was awarded a rating of 106, fourteen pounds behind the filly Minstrella. In the following year, he was rated 125 by Timeform, five pounds behind their best sprinter Ajdal. In the International Classification for 1987, he was rated the second best sprinter in Europe behind Ajdal.

== Stud record ==
At the end of his racing career, Bluebird became a breeding stallion for Coolmore Stud at an initial fee of 12,500 Irish guineas. Although based in Ireland, he also stood for a time in Australia. After standing at the Castle Hyde Stud in County Cork, he was retired from stud duties in 2004.

The best of his offspring included Lake Coniston, Fly to the Stars, Swallow Flight (Sandown Mile), Dolphin Street (Prix de la Forêt), Bluegrass Prince (Diomed Stakes), Delilah (Park Hill Stakes) and Twilight Blues (Duke of York Stakes) in Europe, Blues Traveller (Bay Meadows Handicap), Macaw (Elkhorn Stakes) and Aube Indienne (Yellow Ribbon Stakes) in North America, and Flitter (Winfield Classic) in Australia.

== Pedigree ==
Pedigree of Bluebird (USA), bay stallion, 1984
Sire Storm Bird (CAN) 1978	Northern Dancer (CAN); 1961	Nearctic	Nearco
Sire Storm Bird (CAN) 1978	Northern Dancer (CAN); 1961	Nearctic	Lady Angela
Sire Storm Bird (CAN) 1978	Northern Dancer (CAN); 1961	Natalma	Native Dancer
Sire Storm Bird (CAN) 1978	Northern Dancer (CAN); 1961	Natalma	Almahmoud
Sire Storm Bird (CAN) 1978	South Ocean (CAN); 1967	New Providence	Bull Page
Sire Storm Bird (CAN) 1978	South Ocean (CAN); 1967	New Providence	Fair Colleen
Sire Storm Bird (CAN) 1978	South Ocean (CAN); 1967	Shining Sun	Chop Chop
Sire Storm Bird (CAN) 1978	South Ocean (CAN); 1967	Shining Sun	Solar Display
Dam Ivory Dawn (USA) 1978	Sir Ivor (USA); 1965	Sir Gaylord	Turn-To
Dam Ivory Dawn (USA) 1978	Sir Ivor (USA); 1965	Sir Gaylord	Somethingroyal
Dam Ivory Dawn (USA) 1978	Sir Ivor (USA); 1965	Attica	Mr Trouble
Dam Ivory Dawn (USA) 1978	Sir Ivor (USA); 1965	Attica	Athenia
Dam Ivory Dawn (USA) 1978	Dusky Evening (USA); 1967	Tim Tam	Tom Fool
Dam Ivory Dawn (USA) 1978	Dusky Evening (USA); 1967	Tim Tam	Two Lea
Dam Ivory Dawn (USA) 1978	Dusky Evening (USA); 1967	Home by Dark	Hill Prince
Dam Ivory Dawn (USA) 1978	Dusky Evening (USA); 1967	Home by Dark	Sunday Evening (Family 9-b)
