= Acomb Stakes =

Flat horse race in Britain

- Class: Group 3
- Location: York Racecourse; York, England
- Race type: Flat / Thoroughbred
- Sponsor: Tattersalls
- Website: York

Race information
- Distance: 7f (1,408 metres)
- Surface: Turf
- Track: Left-hand elbow
- Qualification: Two-year-olds
- Weight: 9 st 3 lb Allowances; 3 lb for fillies Penalties; 5 lb for G1 / G2 winners 3 lb for G3 winners
- Purse: £175,000 (2026); 1st: £99,243

Acomb Stakes
2026
Haffner	Gentle Hurricane	Trean

Previous years
2025
Gewan	Italy	Distant Storm
2024
The Lion In Winter	Wimbledon Hawkeye	Ruling Court
2023
Indian Run	Ballymount Boy	Loose Cannon
2022
Chaldean	Indestructible	Oviedo
2021
Royal Patronage	Imperial Fighter	Dubawi Legend

2020-2011
2020
Gear Up	Spycatcher	Broxi
2019
Valdermoro	Harpocrates	Ropey Guest
2018
Phoenix Of Spain	Watan	Persian Moon
2017
Wells Farhh Go	James Garfield	Lansky
2016
Syphax	Best Of Days	Lockheed
2015
Recorder	Bing Bang Bong	Cymric
2014
Dutch Connection	Toocoolforschool	Basateen
2013
Treaty Of Paris	The Grey Gatsby	Il Paparazzi
2012
Dundonnell	Steeler	Afonso De Sousa
2011
Entifaadha	Fort Bastion	Zumbi

2010-2001
2010
Waiter's Dream	Silvertrees	Timothy T
2009
Elusive Pimpernel	Emerald Commander	Poet's Voice
2007
Fast Company	Lucifer Sam	Without A Prayer
2006
Big Timer	Gweebarra	Ready For Spring
2005
Palace Episode	Araafa	Silver Blue
2004
Elliots World	Oude	Shannon Springs
2003
Rule of Law	Celtic Cat	Capped For Victory
2002
Bourbonnais	Salcombe	Wahsheeq
2001
Comfy	Asheer	Toreador

2000-1991
2000
Hemingway	Eminence	Saratov
1999
King's Best	Shamrock City	Race Leader
1998
Auction House	Coliseum	Iscan
1997
Saratoga Springs	Mutawwaj	Chester House
1996
Revoque	Symonds Inn	In Command
1995
Bijou D'Inde	Hammerstein	Jarah
1994
Options Open	Istidaad	Pentire
1993
Concordial	Just Happy	Grand Lodge
1992
Woodchat	Salatin	Self Assured
1991
Torrey Canyon	Niodini	Majal

1990-1988
1990
Sedair	Plan Of Action	Bog Trotter
1989
Aquatic	Smokey Native	Doolar
1988
Thorn Dance	Batshoof	Ceciliano

The Acomb Stakes is a Group 3 flat horse race in Great Britain open to two-year-old horses. It is run at York over a distance of 7 furlongs (1,408 metres), and it is scheduled to take place each year in August.

The event is named after Acomb, an area of York located to the north-west of the racecourse. It was given Listed status in 1998, and promoted to Group 3 level in 2006. It is currently held on the opening day of the four-day Ebor Festival meeting.

The leading horses from the Acomb Stakes sometimes go on to compete in Group 1 races, and certain participants have been successful in the following year's Classics.

== Records ==
Leading jockey (6 wins):

- Lester Piggott - Royal Palace (1966), Dieudonne (1968), Billy Bremner (1971), Tanzor (1974), Padroug (1976), Height of Fashion (1981).

Leading trainer (5 wins):

- Dick Hern - Tartan Pimpernel (1977), Rontino (1979), Height of Fashion (1981), Gorytus (1982), Elusive (1983).
- Mark Johnston - Bijou d'Inde (1995), Bourbonnais (2002), Elliots World (2004), Gear Up (2020), Royal Patronage (2021)

== Winners ==
Year	Winner	Jockey	Trainer	Time
1947	Luke Warm	Sir Gordon Richards	Jack Colling	1:13.40
1948	Kiowa	Doug Smith	Walter Earl	1:13.40
1949	Perigueux	Doug Smith	Harry Wragg	1:12.60
1950	Djebellica	Rae Johnstone	Charles Clout	1:13.60
1951	Alcinus	Rae Johnstone	Charles Semblat	1:12.40
1952	Aureole	Harry Carr	Cecil Boyd-Rochfort	1:14.80
1953	L'Avengro	Eph Smith	Ted Leader	1:12.80
1954	Acropolis	Doug Smith	George Colling	1:18.60
1955	Mamounia	Harry Carr	Cecil Boyd-Rochfort	1:13.00
1956	Snow Leopard	Joe Mercer	Jack Colling	1:19.60
1957	Cool Debate	Denis Ryan	Willie Stephenson	1:18.40
1958	Anthelion	Manny Mercer	Jack Jarvis	1:17.20
1959	Beau Ideal	Duncan Keith	Douglas Gunn	1:15.00
1960	Tender Word	Joe Mercer	Jack Colling	1:14.80
1961	Cyrus	Doug Smith	Geoffrey Brooke	1:15.20
1962	Confidence	Garnet Bougoure	Paddy Prendergast	1:16.20
1963	Causerie	Greville Starkey	John Oxley	1:15.60
1964	Royalgo	Bill Williamson	Harry Wragg	1:15.00
1965	Le Cordonnier	Geoff Lewis	Staff Ingham	1:15.20
1966	Royal Palace	Lester Piggott	Noel Murless	1:16.00
1967	Alaska Way	Bruce Raymond	Humphrey Cottrill	1:17.20
1968	Dieudonne	Lester Piggott	Fulke Johnson Houghton	1:17.40
1969	Dubrava	Bill Williamson	Paddy Prendergast	1:16.20
1970	Sir Lark	Johnny Seagrave	Pat Rohan	1:17.00
1971	Billy Bremner	Lester Piggott	Frank Carr	1:17.30
1972	Kwang Su	Joe Mercer	Paddy Prendergast	1:13.40
1973	Consolatrix	Christy Roche	Paddy Prendergast	1:16.80
1974	Tanzor	Lester Piggott	Clive Brittain	1:14.49
1975	Mid Beat	Paul Cook	Nick Vigors	1:13.46
1976	Padroug	Lester Piggott	Vincent O'Brien	1:15.57
1977	Tartan Pimpernel	Willie Carson	Dick Hern	1:14.46
1978	Senorita Poquito	Ernie Johnson	Barry Hills	1:16.23
1979	Rontino (Note: Master Willie finished 1st in 1979 but was relegated to 2nd)	Willie Carson	Dick Hern	1:28.65
1980	Cocaine	Joe Mercer	Jeremy Hindley	1:29.23
1981	Height of Fashion	Lester Piggott	Dick Hern	1:27.46
1982	Gorytus	Willie Carson	Dick Hern	1:24.80
1983	Elusive	Willie Carson	Dick Hern	1:31.22
1984	Kohaylan	Michael Hills	Jeremy Hindley	1:26.44
1985	Native Wizard	Tony Murray	Harry Thomson Jones	1:29.09
1986	Bellotto	Pat Eddery	Jeremy Tree	1:26.60
1987	Always Fair	Walter Swinburn	Michael Stoute	1:31.03
1988	Thorn Dance	Steve Cauthen	Henry Cecil	1:25.89
1989	Aquatic	Walter Swinburn	Michael Stoute	1:24.13
1990	Sedair	Steve Cauthen	Henry Cecil	1:26.03
1991	Torrey Canyon	Pat Eddery	Roger Charlton	1:27.16
1992	Woodchat	Alan Munro	Paul Cole	1:23.65
1993	Concordial	Pat Eddery	Roger Charlton	1:25.91
1994	Options Open	Pat Eddery	Richard Hannon Sr.	1:22.98
1995	Bijou d'Inde	Darryll Holland	Mark Johnston	1:23.53
1996	Revoque	John Reid	Peter Chapple-Hyam	1:24.05
1997	Saratoga Springs	Michael Kinane	Aidan O'Brien	1:26.08
1998	Auction House	Michael Hills	Barry Hills	1:23.30
1999	King's Best	Gary Stevens	Sir Michael Stoute	1:23.03
2000	Hemingway	Michael Kinane	Aidan O'Brien	1:25.12
2001	Comfy	Kieren Fallon	Sir Michael Stoute	1:23.09
2002	Bourbonnais	Kevin Darley	Mark Johnston	1:25.71
2003	Rule of Law	Jamie Spencer	David Loder	1:23.42
2004	Elliots World	Joe Fanning	Mark Johnston	1:25.06
2005	Palace Episode	Kieren Fallon	Kevin Ryan	1:24.27
2006	Big Timer	Tom Eaves	Ian Semple	1:27.28
2007	Fast Company	Ryan Moore	Brian Meehan	1:26.66
2008	Abandoned due to waterlogging
2009	Elusive Pimpernel	Eddie Ahern	John Dunlop	1:22.45
2010	Waiter's Dream (Note: The 2010 winner Waiter's Dream was later exported to Hong Kong and renamed New Greenfield)	Kieren Fallon	Brian Meehan	1:24.82
2011	Entifaadha	Richard Hills	William Haggas	1:26.12
2012	Dundonnell	James Doyle	Roger Charlton	1:23.88
2013	Treaty of Paris (Note: The 2013 winner Treaty of Paris was later exported to Hong Kong and renamed Too Fast)	James Doyle	Henry Candy	1:23.02
2014	Dutch Connection	William Buick	Charles Hills	1:22.32
2015	Recorder	Frankie Dettori	William Haggas	1:24.20
2016	Syphax	Jamie Spencer	Kevin Ryan	1:23.46
2017	Wells Farhh Go	David Allan	Tim Easterby	1:26.32
2018	Phoenix of Spain	Jamie Spencer	Charles Hills	1:24.19
2019	Valdermoro	Tony Hamilton	Richard Fahey	1:24.09
2020	Gear Up	Silvestre de Sousa	Mark Johnston	1:24.59
2021	Royal Patronage	Jason Hart	Mark Johnston	1:23.56
2022	Chaldean	Ryan Moore	Andrew Balding	1:25.95
2023	Indian Run	Daniel Tudhope	Eve Johnson Houghton	1:24.13
2024	The Lion In Winter	Ryan Moore	Aidan O'Brien	1:21.58
2025	Gewan	P. J. McDonald	Andrew Balding	1:25.57
2026	Haffner	Ryan Moore	Aidan O'Brien	1:25.96

== See also ==
- Horse racing in Great Britain
- List of British flat horse races
