= Royal Applause =

British-bred Thoroughbred racehorse (1993–2022)

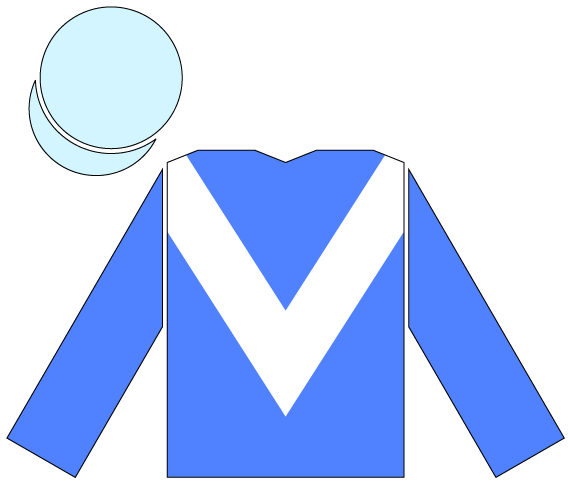
- Racing colours of Maktoum Al Maktoum
- Sire: Waajib
- Grandsire: Try My Best
- Dam: Flying Melody
- Damsire: Auction Ring
- Sex: Stallion
- Foaled: 24 February 1993
- Died: 24 December 2022 (aged 29)
- Country: Great Britain
- Colour: Bay
- Breeder: Gainsborough Stud
- Owner: Maktoum Al Maktoum
- Trainer: Barry Hills
- Record: 25: 9–1–1
- Earnings: £374,210

Major wins
- Coventry Stakes (1995); Gimcrack Stakes (1995); Middle Park Stakes (1995); Duke of York Stakes (1997); Cork and Orrery Stakes (1997); Haydock Sprint Cup (1997)

Awards
- European Champion Sprinter (1997)

Royal Applause (24 February 1993 – 24 December 2022) was a British Champion Thoroughbred racehorse and sire. He was undefeated in four races as a two-year-old in 1995, including the Group One Middle Park Stakes, the Group Two Gimcrack Stakes and the Group Three Coventry Stakes. He was rated the second best colt of the year behind Alhaarth. After a disappointing three-year-old season, he returned as a four-year-old in 1997 to become European Champion Sprinter, when he won four of his seven races including the Group One Haydock Sprint Cup, the Group Three Duke of York Stakes, and the Group Three Cork and Orrery Stakes (now a Group One race). He went on to become a successful stallion and was based at the Royal Studs at Sandringham, Norfolk.

== Background ==
Royal Applause was a dark-coated bay horse with two white socks who stood 15.2 hands high. He was bred at his owner Maktoum Al Maktoum's Gainsborough Stud near Newbury in Berkshire, England.

His sire Waajib was a miler who won the Queen Anne Stakes at Royal Ascot in 1988. As a stallion, Waajib stood for the Coolmore Stud before being sold to Japan's Shadai Stud in 1995; he was shuttled between Japan and Australia for four seasons before dying at Amsterdam Airport while being returned to Ireland in January 1999. Waajib was not a great success, siring the winners of fewer than 150 races, with Royal Applause being easily his best offspring. Royal Applause's dam Flying Melody was a successful racehorse who went on to be an excellent broodmare. Apart from Royal Applause she produced the European Champion Two-Year-Old Filly, Lyric Fantasy, and the Dewhurst Stakes winner, In Command. As a descendant of the broodmare Oola Hills, Royal Applause was also related to Pappa Fourway and Park Top.

Royal Applause was trained throughout his career by Barry Hills at Lambourn. During his two-year-old season he was ridden by Walter Swinburn, who lost his job as Maktoum Al Maktoum's retained jockey at the end of the year. In his comeback year of 1997 Royal Applause was ridden in all his races by his trainer's son Michael Hills.

== Racing career ==
=== 1995: two-year-old season ===
Royal Applause made his debut in a five-furlong maiden race at his local course Newbury in May. He disputed the lead for most of the way before pulling clear and winning "easily" by three and a half lengths from Rambling Bear. The runner-up went on to be a top class sprinter, winning the King George Stakes and the Palace House Stakes. Three weeks later Royal Applause was moved up in class as he was sent to Royal Ascot for the Coventry Stakes. Swinburn sent the colt into the lead from the start and he was never headed, running on strongly to win by two lengths from Russian Revival.

By the time Royal Applause reappeared in the Gimcrack Stakes at York in August, the form of his Ascot win had been boosted when the fourth-placed Tagula won the July Stakes at Newmarket. Royal Applause started as the odds-on favourite at York, but after leading for most of the race he was strongly challenged in the final furlong by Tumbleweed Ridge and had to be driven out to hold on and win by a head.

On his final race of the season Royal Applause was stepped up to the highest level for the Group One Middle Park Stakes at Newmarket. He was made second favourite behind Kahir Almaydan, who had won the Mill Reef Stakes by six lengths. Swinburn sent the colt into the lead at halfway from which point he looked to be "the only possible winner." In the final stages he pulled well clear of his rivals to record an "impressive" four length win over the Anglesey Stakes winner Woodborough, with Kahir Almaydan third. He was offered at prices between 8/1 and 16/1 for the one mile 2000 Guineas but Barry Hills advised caution as, in his opinion, the colt was essentially a sprinter: "I would tend to think he's got a lot of natural speed and will probably stay at six furlongs."

=== 1996: three-year-old season ===
Despite Hills' reservations, Royal Applause began his three-year-old season by being sent straight to the 2000 Guineas at Newmarket without a trial race. Ridden for the first time by Michael Hills he started the 15/2 fourth choice in the betting. Hills attempted to make all the running, but after leading for six furlongs, Royal Applause tired in the last quarter-mile and finished tenth of the thirteen runners behind Mark of Esteem. He was brought back to sprint distances for the King's Stand Stakes at Royal Ascot. In a change of tactics he was held up by Hills in the early stages, but he found little in the closing stages and finished sixth behind Pivotal.

A month later he was dropped in class and won a minor stakes race over six furlongs at Doncaster, leading all the way under Kieren Fallon and beating his old rival Russian Revival by a neck. On his final start, he was moved back up to Group One level for the Haydock Sprint Cup, but after leading early he weakened in the closing stages to finish ninth of the eleven runners. Overall, his season was disappointing with only a single victory.

=== 1997: four-year-old season ===
Royal Applause returned to the racecourse as a four-year-old in the Listed Cammidge Trophy at Doncaster in March. He led from the start and outpaced his opponents in the last quarter-mile to win by two lengths in his most impressive display since his two-year-old season. At York in May, Royal Applause won his first Group Race for nineteen months as he led all the way to take the Duke of York Stakes by a length and a quarter to establish himself as a genuinely top-class sprinter.

At Royal Ascot, Royal Applause faced a field of twenty-three in the Cork and Orrery Stakes, for which he started favourite at 11/2. The huge field split into two groups, with Royal Applause leading the far side group. He opened up a clear lead in the last two furlongs and despite drifting towards the centre of the track in the closing stages he stayed on to win by a length and a half from Blue Goblin. Royal Applause was made 11/10 favourite for the July Cup at Newmarket, although Hills advised that he was "no certainty". He defeated his main market rivals but was unable to cope with the 50/1 outsider Compton Place, who won by one and three quarter lengths. The result, which was greeted by silence from the crowd, was so unexpected that Compton Place's trainer was called before the stewards to give an explanation for his horse's performance.

In September Royal Applause was sent to Haydock for the Sprint Cup. He quickly adopted his customary position at the head of the field as his rivals became involved in an exceptionally rough race behind him. Royal Applause went clear a furlong out to record the biggest win of his career by one and a quarter lengths from the fast-finishing Danetime. After the race Hills called him "the best sprinter I've trained and ... the best around at the moment." When asked about Royal Applause's poor form in 1996 he observed that "horses are like apple trees – you don't get apples all the time."

In his last European race he was sent abroad for the first time and started favourite for the Prix de l'Abbaye at Longchamp. Unusually, he broke slowly and was unable to reach the lead. He challenged strongly in the final furlong but could finish only third, beaten half a length and a short head by the fillies Carmine Lake and Pas de Reponse. On his final start, he was sent to Hollywood Park for the Breeders' Cup Sprint. His cause was not helped when he panicked and sustained minor injuries on his first encounter with American-style starting stalls. He made no show in the race itself, finishing last of the fourteen runners on his only start on dirt.

== Assessment ==
In the official International Classification of two-year-olds for 1995, Royal Applause was given a rating of 124, two pounds below the champion Alhaarth and four pounds clear of the next best.

At the 1997 Cartier Racing Awards, Royal Applause was named European Champion Sprinter. The International Classification rated him the equal-best European sprinter of the year, sharing a 121 rating with Compton Place and the Diadem Stakes winner Elnadim.

Timeform rated Royal Applause at 123 as a two-year-old, 109 as a three-year-old, and 124 as a four-year-old.

== Stud career ==
Royal Applause proved himself as a sire of sires and stood at the Royal Studs at Sandringham, Norfolk. He sired the winners of well over seven hundred races, including seventeen at Group race level, and, not surprisingly given his racing career, proved especially effective as a sire of sprinters. His best winners include Lovelace (Supreme Stakes), Ticker Tape (American Oaks), Acclamation (GB) (Diadem Stakes) and Battle Of Hastings (Colonial Turf Cup).

He is the dam sire of Giga Kick, the Australian Champion Sprinter in 2022/23.

Pensioned from stud duties in 2017, he died at Sandringham House on 24 December 2022 at age 29.

== Pedigree ==
Pedigree of Royal Applause (GB), bay stallion, 1993
Sire Waajib (IRE) 1982	Try My Best; 1967	Northern Dancer	Nearctic
Sire Waajib (IRE) 1982	Try My Best; 1967	Northern Dancer	Natalma
Sire Waajib (IRE) 1982	Try My Best; 1967	Sex Appeal	Buckpasser
Sire Waajib (IRE) 1982	Try My Best; 1967	Sex Appeal	Best In Show
Sire Waajib (IRE) 1982	Coryana; 1969	Sassafras	Sheshoon
Sire Waajib (IRE) 1982	Coryana; 1969	Sassafras	Ruta
Sire Waajib (IRE) 1982	Coryana; 1969	Rosolini	Ragusa
Sire Waajib (IRE) 1982	Coryana; 1969	Rosolini	Corbalton
Dam Flying Melody (IRE) 1985	Auction Ring; 1972	Bold Bidder	Bold Ruler
Dam Flying Melody (IRE) 1985	Auction Ring; 1972	Bold Bidder	High Bid
Dam Flying Melody (IRE) 1985	Auction Ring; 1972	Hooplah	Hillary
Dam Flying Melody (IRE) 1985	Auction Ring; 1972	Hooplah	Beadah
Dam Flying Melody (IRE) 1985	Whispering Star; 1963	Sound Track	Whistler
Dam Flying Melody (IRE) 1985	Whispering Star; 1963	Sound Track	Bridle Way
Dam Flying Melody (IRE) 1985	Whispering Star; 1963	Peggy West	Premonition
Dam Flying Melody (IRE) 1985	Whispering Star; 1963	Peggy West	Oola Hills (Family: 26)
