= Britannia Stakes =

Flat horse race in Britain

- Class: Handicap
- Location: Ascot Racecourse; Ascot, England
- Inaugurated: 1928
- Race type: Flat / Thoroughbred
- Website: Ascot

Race information
- Distance: 1 mile (1,609 metres)
- Surface: Turf
- Track: Straight
- Qualification: Three-year-old colts and geldings
- Weight: Handicap
- Purse: £120,000 (2025); 1st: £61,848

Britannia Stakes
2026
Moonfall	Outback Heat	Jamestown

Previous years
2025
Arabian Story	La Botte	Fearnot
2024
Mickley	Skukuza	Native Warrior
2023
Docklands	New Endeavour	Urban Sprawl
2022
Thesis	Saga	Jimi Hendrix
2021
Perotto	Liffey River	Quintillus

2020-2011
2020
Khaloosy	Finest Sound	Cherokee Trail
2019
Biometric	Turgenev	Fanaar
2018
Ostilio	Curiosity	Magnificent
2017
Bless Him	Ronald R	Tricorn
2016
Defrocked	Abe Lincoln	Chief Whip
2015
War Envoy	Udododontu	Sacrificial
2014
Born In Bombay	Bow Creek	Hors De Combat
2013
Roca Tumu	Tarikhi	Queensberry Rules
2012
Fast Or Free	Mister Music	Bronze Angel
2011
Sagramor	Cai Shen	The Tichborne

2010-2001
2010
Ransom Note	Invincible Soul	Greyfriarschorista
2009
Fareer	Secret Society	Mirrored
2008
Fifteen Love	Masaalek	Yaddree
2007
Eddie Jock	Ea	St Philip
2006
Sir Gerard	Easy Air	Royal Prince
2005
Mostashaar	Brecon Beacon	Hawkes Bay
2004
Mandobi	Lucayan Legend	Thyolo
2003
New Seeker	Helm Bank	Court Masterpiece
2002
Pentecost	Ghannam	Shot To Fame
2001
Analyser	Olympic Express	Muthaaber

2000-1991
2000
El Gran Papa	Sign Of Hope	Kookaburra
1999
Pythios	Siege	Harlequin Dancer
1998
Plan-B	Pantar	Lucayan Indian
1997
Fly To The Stars	Komi	Rapier
1996
North Song	Insatiable	Russian Music
1995
Medaille Militaire	Beauchamp Jazz	Bedivere
1994
Wizard King	Winter Coat	Vlaminck
1993
Show Faith	Just You Dare	Brigante Di Cielo
1992
Efharisto	Bold Boss	Sharpitor
1991
Ajaad	Rapid Coracle	Gymcrak Premiere

1990-1984
1990
Fox Chapel	Gulmarg	Colourist
1989
Polar Boy	Dream Of Fame	Regent Light
1988
Foreign Survivor	Shabanaz	Fairway Royale
1986
Dallas	Navarzato	Mister Wonderful
1985
Protection	Qualitair Flyer	Jaggery
1984
Torwar	Courting Season	Finian's Rainbow

The Britannia Stakes is a flat handicap horse race in Great Britain open to three-year-old colts and geldings. It is run at Ascot over a distance of 1 mile (1,609 metres) on the straight course, and it is scheduled to take place each year in June on the third day of the Royal Ascot meeting.

The Britannia Stakes was first run in 1928 and takes place over the same course and distance as the Royal Hunt Cup.

== Winners ==
Year	Winner	Weight	Jockey	Trainer	Time
1928	Sea Crag	9-00	Harry Beasley Jr.	Sam H Darling	1:46.80
1929	The MacNab	7-08	Freddie Fox	Fred Darling	1:40.20
1930	Nick of Time	8-07	Tommy Burns Sr.	Frank Hartigan	1:42.80
1931	Ojala	8-07	Harry Beasley Jr.	Atty Persse	1:43.40
1932	Fonab	7-07	Gordon Richards	Fred Darling	1:38.40
1933	Tartan	8-01	Harry Wragg	Jack Jarvis	1:40.80
1934	Guinea Gap	7-02	Johnny Dines	Charles Cowie	1:42.60
1935	Finalist	8-13	Harry Wragg	Ossie Bell	1:43.00
1936	Edgehill	8-00	Eph Smith	Jack Jarvis	1:42.60
1937	Azam Pasha	8-04	Harry Wragg	Noel Cannon	1:40.40
1938	Tin Hat	8-08	Richard Perryman	Ted Leader	1:37.20
1939	Foletta	8-03	Harry Wragg	Ossie Bell	1:42.80
1940–45	No Race
1946	French Toy	7-01	Albert Richardson	Sam Armstrong	1:44.60
1947	Oros	8-07	Gordon Richards	Noel Murless	1:39.00
1948	Marconi	8-03	Michael Beary	Atty Persse	1:42.20
1949	Burpham	8-03	Tommy Burn	Wiliam Smyth	1:39.20
1950	Kelling	7-04	Ray Reader	Alec Waugh	1:40.60
1951	Lord Of Verona	8-07	Billy Nevett	Harry Peacock	1:40.20
1952	Firstling	7-07	Ray Reader	Ken Cundell	1:39.80
1953	Stormy Hour	8-03	Manny Mercer	Jack Jarvis	1:42.00
1954	Minstrel	8-01	Manny Mercer	Jack Jarvis	1:44.00
1955	Cronus	8-01	Eph Smith	Ted Leader	1:43.72
1956	Empire Way	8-06	Bill Rickaby	Jack Jarvis	1:45.81
1957	Pundit	8-02	Geoff Lewis	Staff Ingham	1:42.99
1958	Legal Tie	8-00	Edgar Britt	Rufus Beasley	1:41.90
1959	Macquario	8-01	Eph Smith	Noel Murless	1:43.04
1960	Right Of Way	8-12	Eddie Hide	Charles Elsey	1:48.05
1961	Firewalker	7-09	Ron Hutchinson	Bill O'Gorman Sr.	1:46.50
1962	Fiacre	8-13	Joe Sime	Rufus Beasley	1:46.78
1963	Ros Rock	9-07	Jimmy Lindley	Jeremy Tree	1:53.49
1964	Double Fall	8-05	Joe Mercer	Derrick Candy	1:52.83
1965	Sheridan	8-11	Bruce Raymond	Jack Clayton	1:44.54
1966	Corinto	8-09	Ron Hutchinson	Harry Wragg	1:42.50
1967	Waterloo Place	8-07	Bill Williamson	Harry Thomson Jones	1:44.14
1968	Delayed Tip	9-01	Joe Mercer	Jack Watts	1:45.71
1969	Closeness	7-06	Des Cullen	Harry Wragg	1:45.13
1970	Richboy	7-13	Eddie Hide	Sir Gordon Richards	1:39.53
1971	Stubb's Gazette	7-11	Willie Carson	Doug Smith	1:56.28
1972	Redundant	8-11	Geoff Lewis	Noel Murless	1:44.12
1973	Tudor Rhythm	8-03	Pat Eddery	Peter Walwyn	1:44.53
1974	Final Chord	8-10	Joe Mercer	Dick Hern	1:39.53
1975	Chil The Kite	8-13	Geoff Lewis	Bruce Hobbs	1:42.23
1976	Strabo	8-05	Geoff Lewis	Dick Hern	1:42.55
1977	Finite	8-00	Paul Cook	Michael Stoute	1:43.50
1978	Rhineland	8-11	Pat Eddery	Peter Walwyn	1:43.20
1979	Welsh Chanter	8-07	Joe Mercer	Henry Cecil	1:41.75
1980	April Bouquet	7-11	Willie Carson	Dick Hern	1:42.39
1981	Olympic Glory	8-06	Greville Starkey	Guy Harwood	1:41.38
1982	Bali Dancer	8-05	Walter Swinburn	Michael Stoute	1:43.10
1983	Teleprompter	7-13	Willie Carson	Bill Watts	1:40.63
1984	Torwar	8-05	Darrel McHargue	Olivier Douieb	1:41.04
1985	Protection	9-07	Steve Cauthen	Henry Cecil	1:45.78
1986	Dallas	8-07	Pat Eddery	Luca Cumani	1:38.17
1987	Genobra	8-02	Chris Rutter	Merrick Francis	1:50.86
1988	Foreign Survivor	9-03	Pat Eddery	Olivier Douieb	1:41.04
1989	Polar Boy	8-08	Steve Cauthen	Henry Cecil	1:41.14
1990	Fox Chapel	7-07	Gary Hind	Richard Hannon Sr.	1:44.10
1991	Ajaad	9-00	Bruce Raymond	Michael Stoute	1:40.90
1992	Efharisto	8-00	Michael Roberts	Clive Brittain	1:39.96
1993	Show Faith	8-05	Pat Eddery	Richard Hannon Sr.	1:46.05
1994	Wizard King	7-07	John Lowe	Mark Prescott	1:40.42
1995	Medaille Militaire	7-09	Richard Quinn	John Dunlop	1:41.17
1996	North Song	8-01	Gary Hind	John Gosden	1:39.90
1997	Fly to the Stars	9-03	Olivier Peslier	Mark Johnston	1:39.95
1998	Plan-B	8-07	Frankie Dettori	John Gosden	1:42.44
1999	Pythios	9-00	Kieren Fallon	Henry Cecil	1:40.07
2000	El Gran Papa	8-04	Franny Norton	John Gosden	1:41.91
2001	Analyser	8-03	Franny Norton	John Gosden	1:40.07
2003	New Seeker	8-08	Jamie Spencer	Clive Cox	1:42.19
2004	Mandobi	8-12	Kieren Fallon	Alec Stewart	1:40.85
2005 (Note: The 2005 running took place at York)	Mostashaar	9-01	Richard Hills	Sir Michael Stoute	1:36.35
2006	Sir Gerard	8-12	Jamie Spencer	James Fanshawe	1:39.87
2007	Eddie Jock	9-07	Johnny Murtagh	Michael Bell	1:39.93
2008	Fifteen Love	8-10	Steve Drowne	Roger Charlton	1:40.10
2009	Fareer	8-10	Richard Hills	Ed Dunlop	1:40.31
2010	Ransom Note	8-10	Michael Hills	Barry Hills	1:37.82
2011	Sagramor	8-13	Nicky Mackay	Hughie Morrison	1:44.55
2012	Fast Or Free	8-10	Ryan Moore	William Haggas	1:42.08
2013	Roca Tumu (Note: The 2013 winner Roca Tumu was later exported to Hong Kong and renamed Beauty Flame)	8-12	Billy Lee	Joanna Morgan	1:37.52
2014	Born In Bombay (Note: The 2014 winner Born In Bombay was later exported to Hong Kong and renamed Born In China)	8-04	David Probert	Andrew Balding	1:38.40
2015	War Envoy	9-06	Ryan Moore	Aidan O'Brien	1:38.57
2016	Defrocked (Note: The 2016 winner Defrocked was later exported to Hong Kong and renamed Limitless)	9-01	Jamie Spencer	Jamie Osborne	1:40.42
2017	Bless Him	8-09	Jamie Spencer	David Simcock	1:40.59
2018	Ostilio	8-09	Silvestre de Sousa	Simon Crisford	1:38.85
2019	Biometric	8-08	Harry Bentley	Ralph Beckett	1:41.25
2020	Khaloosy	9-02	Jim Crowley	Roger Varian	1:41.22
2021	Perotto	9-03	Oisin Murphy	Marcus Tregoning	1:39.19
2022	Thesis (Note: The 2022 winner Thesis was later exported to Hong Kong)	8-11	Ryan Moore	Roger Charlton	1:38.56
2023	Docklands	9-02	Hayley Turner	Harry Eustace	1:40.02
2024	Mickley (Note: The 2024 winner Mickley was later exported to Hong Kong)	8-11	Callum Rodriguez	Edward Bethell	1:38.62
2025	Arabian Story	9-06	Oisin Murphy	Saeed bin Suroor	1:38.80
2026	Moonfall	8-10	Zac Lloyd	George Boughey	1:38.47

== See also ==
- Horse racing in Great Britain
- List of British flat horse races
