= Shavian (horse) =

British-bred Thoroughbred racehorse

- Sire: Kris
- Grandsire: Sharpen Up
- Dam: Mixed Applause
- Damsire: Nijinsky
- Sex: Stallion
- Foaled: 31 March 1987
- Country: United Kingdom
- Colour: Bay
- Breeder: Lord Howard de Walden
- Owner: Lord Howard de Walden
- Trainer: Henry Cecil
- Record: 8: 3-1-2
- Earnings: £202,479

Major wins
- St James's Palace Stakes (1990); Celebration Mile (1990)

Shavian (foaled 31 March 1987) was a British Thoroughbred racehorse and sire. He showed his best form over one mile and usually ran his races from the front. As a two-year-old in 1989 he showed promising form, winning the second of his two starts. In the following year he was beaten twice in spring but then established himself as a top-class miler with wins in the St James's Palace Stakes and the Celebration Mile. He was retired at the end of the year and stood as a breeding stallion in Europe and Japan, but had little success as a sire of winners.

== Background ==
Shavian was a bay horse bred in England by his owner. He was sired by de Walden's stallion Kris, an outstanding miler who won fourteen of his sixteen races between 1978 and 1980. Kris's other progeny included Oh So Sharp, Unite, Balisada and Shamshir. Shavian's dam Mixed Applause showed high-class form as a two-year-old in 1978 when she won the Sweet Solera Stakes. She went on to produce the Ascot Gold Cup winner Paean and, as a descendant of the broodmare My Game, was closely related to Marwell, Marling and Unite.

The colt was sent into training with Henry Cecil at his Warren Place stable in Newmarket, Suffolk and was ridden in all but one of his races by Steve Cauthen.

== Racing career ==
=== 1989: two-year-old season ===
Shavian made his racecourse debut in a seven furlong maiden race at Doncaster Racecourse on 13 September. He started 11/10 favourite against eight opponents, but after leading for most of the way he was overtaken in the closing stages and was beaten a neck by the 25/1 outsider Message Pad. Two weeks later he started odds-on favourite for the Mornington Stakes over the same distance at Ascot. Cauthen sent him into the lead from the start and the colt drew away in the closing stages to win by three lengths from Kaheel (later to finish fourth in The Derby) with Lord Florey in third.

=== 1990: three-year-old season ===
Shavian began his three-year-old season in the Craven Stakes (a trial race for the 2000 Guineas) over one mile at Newmarket Racecourse on 19 April. After racing prominently he appeared to be somewhat outpaced in the closing stages and finished third behind Tirol and Sure Sharp. He was moved up in distance for his next race, the Predominate Stakes over ten furlongs at Goodwood Racecourse and was ridden by Willie Ryan as Cauthen opted to ride his stable companion Razeen. He took the lead half a mile from the finish but was overtaken approaching the final furlong and finished fourth behind Razeen, Elmaamul and Silca An' Key.

The colt was brought back in distance for the 145th running of the St James's Palace Stakes over one mile at Royal Ascot on 19 June. Lord Florey, who had won the Heron Stakes in May, was made the 9/4 favourite ahead of Anshan (European Free Handicap, third in the 2000 Guineas), Royal Academy, Rock City (Gimcrack Stakes, Greenham Stakes) and Dashing Blade (Dewhurst Stakes) with Shavian next in the betting on 11/1. The other three runners were Eton Lad (Diomed Stakes), Book The Band and Call To Arms. Royal Academy refused to enter the stalls and was withdrawn at the start. Cauthen sent Shavian into the lead from the start and turned into the straight with a clear advantage over Rock City, Book The Band and Anshan. He was never seriously challenged in the straight and won by one and a half lengths from Rock City, with Lord Florey finishing strongly in third.

On 1 August, Shavian was matched against older horses for the first time in the Sussex Stakes at Goodwood Racecourse and started 100/30 favourite in a seven-runner field. He led for most of the way but was overtaken approaching the final furlong and finished third behind the four-year-olds Distant Relative and Green Line Express. Twenty-four days later Shavian started 5/2 favourite for the Celebration Mile over the same course and distance. His four opponents were Lord Florey, Mirror Black (Badener Meile), Safawan (Lockinge Stakes) and Candy Glen (Gran Criterium, Premio Parioli). He led from the start and won by two and a half lengths from Candy Glen. On 29 September Shavian started second favourite behind Tirol in the Queen Elizabeth II Stakes at Ascot. After leading the ten-runner field into the straight he weakened and finished fifth, more than sixteen lengths behind the winner Markofdistinction.

== Stud record ==
Shavian stood as a breeding stallion in Britain for three years before being exported to Japan. He was not a success at stud, with the best of his offspring being the listed race winners Armenian Dancer and Maggi for Margaret and the successful handicapper Gaelic Storm.

== Pedigree ==
Pedigree of Shavian (GB), bay stallion, 1987
Sire Kris (GB) 1976	Sharpen Up (GB); 1969	Atan	Native Dancer
Sire Kris (GB) 1976	Sharpen Up (GB); 1969	Atan	Mixed Marriage
Sire Kris (GB) 1976	Sharpen Up (GB); 1969	Rocchetta	Rockfella
Sire Kris (GB) 1976	Sharpen Up (GB); 1969	Rocchetta	Chambiges
Sire Kris (GB) 1976	Doubly Sure (GB); 1971	Reliance	Tantieme
Sire Kris (GB) 1976	Doubly Sure (GB); 1971	Reliance	Relance
Sire Kris (GB) 1976	Doubly Sure (GB); 1971	Soft Angels	Crepello
Sire Kris (GB) 1976	Doubly Sure (GB); 1971	Soft Angels	Sweet Angel
Dam Mixed Applause (USA) 1976	Nijinsky (CAN); 1967	Northern Dancer	Nearctic
Dam Mixed Applause (USA) 1976	Nijinsky (CAN); 1967	Northern Dancer	Natalma
Dam Mixed Applause (USA) 1976	Nijinsky (CAN); 1967	Flaming Page	Bull Page
Dam Mixed Applause (USA) 1976	Nijinsky (CAN); 1967	Flaming Page	Flaring Top
Dam Mixed Applause (USA) 1976	My Advantage (GB); 1966	Princely Gift	Nasrullah
Dam Mixed Applause (USA) 1976	My Advantage (GB); 1966	Princely Gift	Blue Gem
Dam Mixed Applause (USA) 1976	My Advantage (GB); 1966	My Game	My Babu
Dam Mixed Applause (USA) 1976	My Advantage (GB); 1966	My Game	Flirting (Family: 14-c)
