= Shamshir (horse) =

British-bred Thoroughbred racehorse

- Sire: Kris
- Grandsire: Sharpen Up
- Dam: Free Guest
- Damsire: Be My Guest
- Sex: Mare
- Foaled: 21 February 1988
- Country: United Kingdom
- Colour: Chestnut
- Breeder: Fittocks Stud Ltd
- Owner: Sheikh Mohammed
- Trainer: Luca Cumani
- Record: 11: 2-3-2
- Earnings: £203,947

Major wins
- Brent Walker Fillies' Mile (1990)

Shamshir (foaled 21 February 1988) was a British Thoroughbred racehorse and broodmare. In racing career which lasted from August 1990 until October 1991 she won two of her eleven races. As a two-year-old in 1990 she was one of the best fillies of her generation in Britain, winning a maiden race and being narrowly beaten in the May Hill Stakes before recording her biggest win in the Group One Fillies' Mile. She failed to win as a three-year-old but finished second in The Oaks and the Nassau Stakes and third in the Yorkshire Oaks. She was retired at the end of the year to become a broodmare.

== Background ==
Shamshir was a chestnut mare with a white blaze and white socks on her hind legs, bred in the England by Luca Cumani's Fittocks Stud. She was sired by Kris, an outstanding miler who won fourteen of his sixteen races between 1979 and 1981. His other progeny included Oh So Sharp, Unite, Balisada and Shavian. Her dam Free Guest was a top-class racemare who won the Sun Chariot Stakes (twice), Nassau Stakes and Princess Royal Stakes. She was also a half-sister to Royal Ballerina who finished second in both The Oaks and the Irish Oaks.

The filly was acquired by Sheikh Mohammed and trained by Luca Cumani at Newmarket, Suffolk. As the owner of Fittocks Stud, Cumani was also responsible for breeding the filly. Shamshir was ridden in all of her races by Frankie Dettori, who was nineteen years old when the filly began her racing career. As her sire Kris was named after a Malaysian dagger, Shamshir was named after a type of Persian sword

== Racing career ==
=== 1990: two-year-old season ===
On her racecourse debut Shamshir started favourite for a seven furlong maiden race at Newmarket Racecourse on 10 August and finished fifth of the ten runners behind the Clive Brittain-trained Kohinoor. In a similar event over the same course and distance two weeks later she started 3/1 second favourite behind the John Gosden-trained Majmu. She was amongst the leaders from the start, overtook Majmu a furlong out and held off the renewed challenge of the favourite to win by a head with a gap of two and a half lengths back to the other fourteen runners. In September Shamshir was stepped up in class and distance for the Group Three May Hill Stakes over one mile at Doncaster Racecourse. She started 6/1 third favourite, alongside Majmu and behind the Sweet Solera Stakes winner Trojan Crown and the Michael Stoute-trained maiden winner Joud. After being restrained by Dettori in the early stages, Shamshir moved up to dispute the lead but after a sustained struggle with Majmu she was beaten a short head, with the pair finishing six lengths clear of Trojan Crown in third.

On 29 September Shamhir was one of twelve fillies to contest the Brent Walker Fillies' Mile at Ascot Racecourse, which was being run for the first time as a Group One race. The highly regarded maiden winner Third Watch started favourite with Shamshir joint second choice in the betting on 6/1 alongside the Prestige Stakes winner Jaffa Line whilst the other nine runners included Majmu, Trojan Crown and Glowing Ardour (Silken Glider Stakes). Shamshir turned into the straight in fourth place behind Third Watch before moving up to take the led approaching the final furlong. She stayed on well in the closing stages to win by two lengths from Safa with a gap of five lengths back to Atlantic Flyer in third.

=== 1991: three-year-old season ===
Shamshir made her first appearance of 1991 in the Musidora Stakes (a trial race for the Oaks Stakes) over ten furlongs at York Racecourse on 14 May. She started the 11/4 joint favourite but finished third, beaten a length and a head by Gussy Marlowe and Dartrey. She was then moved up in distance for the Oaks over one and a half miles at Epsom Downs Racecourse on 8 June and started 6/1 second favourite behind Shadayid. After turning into the straight in seventh place she made steady progress in the last quarter mile to finish second to the 50/1 outsider Jet Ski Lady. Apart from Shamshir, the other beaten fillies included Jaffa Line, Magnificent Star and Dartrey. In the Ribblesdale Stakes at Royal Ascot twelve days later Shamshir started favourite but finished unplaced behind Third Watch. On 3 August the filly was brought back in distance for the ten furlong Nassau Stakes at Goodwood Racecourse and finished second to the four-year-old Ruby Tiger with Gussy Marlowe in fourth. Later that month she contested the Yorkshire Oaks and finished third behind Magnificent Star and Jet Ski Lady.

Shamshir was sent to France for her last two races. In the Prix Vermeille over 2400 metres at Longchamp Racecourse on 15 September she finished sixth of the fourteen runners, three and a half behind the winner Magic Night. On 6 October, over the same course and distance, she started a 91/1 outsider for the 70th running of the Prix de l'Arc de Triomphe and finished tenth of the fourteen runners behind Suave Dancer.

== Breeding record ==
Shamshir was retired from racing to become a broodmare for her owner's stud. She produced at least two known foals:

- Shimazu, a bay colt, foaled in 1994, sired by Darshaan. Won one race.
- Adobe, bay colt (later gelded), 1995, by Green Desert. Won seventeen races from 164 starts.

== Pedigree ==
Pedigree of Shamshir (GB), chestnut mare, 1988
| Sire Kris (GB) 1976 | Sharpen Up (GB); 1969 | Atan | Native Dancer |
| Sire Kris (GB) 1976 | Sharpen Up (GB); 1969 | Atan | Mixed Marriage |
| Sire Kris (GB) 1976 | Sharpen Up (GB); 1969 | Rocchetta | Rockefella |
| Sire Kris (GB) 1976 | Sharpen Up (GB); 1969 | Rocchetta | Chambiges |
| Sire Kris (GB) 1976 | Doubly Sure (GB); 1971 | Reliance | Tantieme |
| Sire Kris (GB) 1976 | Doubly Sure (GB); 1971 | Reliance | Relance |
| Sire Kris (GB) 1976 | Doubly Sure (GB); 1971 | Soft Angels | Crepello |
| Sire Kris (GB) 1976 | Doubly Sure (GB); 1971 | Soft Angels | Sweet Angel |
| Dam Free Guest (IRE) 1981 | Be My Guest (USA); 1974 | Northern Dancer | Nearctic |
| Dam Free Guest (IRE) 1981 | Be My Guest (USA); 1974 | Northern Dancer | Natalma |
| Dam Free Guest (IRE) 1981 | Be My Guest (USA); 1974 | What A Treat | Tudor Minstrel |
| Dam Free Guest (IRE) 1981 | Be My Guest (USA); 1974 | What A Treat | Rare Treat |
| Dam Free Guest (IRE) 1981 | Fremanche (FR); 1973 | Jim French | Graustark |
| Dam Free Guest (IRE) 1981 | Fremanche (FR); 1973 | Jim French | Dinner Partner |
| Dam Free Guest (IRE) 1981 | Fremanche (FR); 1973 | La Manche | Sideral |
| Dam Free Guest (IRE) 1981 | Fremanche (FR); 1973 | La Manche | Cote d'Argent (Family: 12-d) |
