= Possessive Dancer =

British-bred Thoroughbred racehorse

- Sire: Shareef Dancer
- Grandsire: Northern Dancer
- Dam: Possessive
- Damsire: Posse
- Sex: Mare
- Foaled: 14 May 1988
- Country: United Kingdom
- Colour: Bay
- Breeder: Walter Swinburn Ltd
- Owner: Ahmed Al Maktoum
- Trainer: Alex Scott
- Record: 8: 5-0-0
- Earnings: £232,806

Major wins
- Oaks d'Italia (1991); Irish Oaks (1991)

Possessive Dancer (14 May 1988 – after 2002) was a British Thoroughbred racehorse and broodmare. In a racing career which lasted from November 1990 until May 1992 she competed in four countries and won five of her eight races. After winning her only start as a juvenile in 1990, she showed relentless improvement in the first half of the following year, winning two handicap races before taking the Oaks d'Italia and the Irish Oaks. She failed to reproduce her best form in her three subsequent races and was retired from racing in 1992. She had some success as a broodmare.

== Background ==
Possessive Dancer was a bay mare bred in the United Kingdom by Walter Swinburn Limited. During her racing career she was owned by Ahmed Al Maktoum and trained by Alex Scott in Newmarket, Suffolk.

Her sire Shareef Dancer was the highest-rated horse in Europe in 1983, a year in which he won the Irish Derby. He sired few other top-class horses but was the damsire of Dubai Millennium. Her dam Possessive was an unraced daughter of the American-bred miler Posse. Possessive's dam Front Row won the 1968 Irish 1000 Guineas and was a half-sister to Black Satin who won the same race two years later.

== Racing career ==
=== 1990: two-year-old season ===
Possessive Dancer made her racecourse debut in a maiden race over six furlongs at Newmarket Racecourse on 1 November 1990 and started at odds of 100/30 in a six-runner field. Ridden by Walter Swinburn she stayed on in the last quarter mile to take the lead in the final strides and won by a neck from No Comebacks.

=== 1991: three-year-old season ===
On her first run of 1991 Possessive Dancer was assigned a weight of 122 pounds in a handicap race for three-year-old fillies over one mile at Kempton Park Racecourse on 24 April. Starting at odds of 8/1 she took the lead a furlong from the finish and won by lengths from Elfaslah and seventeen other opponents. Twelve days later she started 4/1 favourite for a handicap over nine furlongs at the same track, despite carrying top weight of 134 pounds and facing male opposition for the first time. She was sixth of the twenty runners on the final turn but went to the front a furlong out and came home two lengths clear of Joli's Great. The filly was then stepped up sharply in class when she was sent to Italy to contest the Group 1 Oaks d'Italia over 2400 metres at San Siro Racecourse in Milan on 18 May. Ridden by Swinburn she started at odds of 4/1 in a twelve-runner field which included Brockette (winner of the Premio Dormello) and Marta Abba (Premio Baggio). Possessive Dancer maintained her unbeaten record as she took the lead a furlong out and won by two lengths from Imco Lisi with a further two and a half lengths back to Brockette in third.

Steve Cauthen took over from Swinburn when Possessive Dancer was one of ten fillies to contest the Irish Oaks over one and a half miles at the Curragh on 13 July. The Epsom Oaks winner Jet Ski Lady started favourite ahead of Third Watch (Ribblesdale Stakes) and Polemic (second in the Prix Saint-Alary) with Possessive Dancer next in the betting on 8/1. After settling his filly in fifth place Cauthen moved up into third behind Jet Ski Lady and the outsider Eileen Jenny entering the straight. Possessive Dancer produced a sustained run on the outside to wear down the Epsom Oaks winner and won by half a length, with a gap of three and a half lengths back to Eileen Jenny in third place.

After five consecutive victories Possessive Dancer started 13/8 favourite in a seven-runner field for the Yorkshire Oaks at York Racecourse on 21 August but sustained her first defeat as she came home fifth behind Magnificent Star, Jet Ski Lady, Shamshir and Third Watch. On her final run of the season she was sent to France for the Prix Vermeille over 2400 metres at Longchamp Racecourse on 15 September and finished tenth of the fourteen runners behind Magic Night.

=== 1992: four-year-old season ===
Possessive Dancer remained in training but made only one appearance when she finished last of the nine runners behind Sapience in the Jockey Club Stakes at Newmarket on 1 May.

== Breeding record ==
After her retirement from racing Possessive Dancer became a broodmare for her owner's stud. She produced seven foals and four winners between 1994 and 2002:

- Maylane, a bay colt (later gelded), foaled in 1994, sired by Mtoto. Won six races including September Stakes and Serlby Stakes.
- Zeeneh, bay filly, 1995, by Machiavellian. Failed to win in three races.
- Mayl, bay filly, 1996, by Lion Cavern. Unraced.
- Mile Wa Quarter, bay colt (gelded), 1997, by Polish Precedent
- Morshid, bay colt (gelded), 1998, by Gulch. Won one race.
- Assraar, bay filly, 2000, by Cadeaux Genereux. Won one race.
- Gold Gun, bay colt (gelded), 2002, by Seeking The Gold. Won one flat race and two National Hunt races.

== Pedigree ==
Pedigree of Possessive Dancer (GB), bay mare, 1988
Sire Shareef Dancer (USA) 1980	Northern Dancer (CAN); 1961	Nearctic	Nearco
Sire Shareef Dancer (USA) 1980	Northern Dancer (CAN); 1961	Nearctic	Lady Angela
Sire Shareef Dancer (USA) 1980	Northern Dancer (CAN); 1961	Natalma	Native Dancer
Sire Shareef Dancer (USA) 1980	Northern Dancer (CAN); 1961	Natalma	Almahmoud
Sire Shareef Dancer (USA) 1980	Sweet Alliance (USA); 1974	Sir Ivor	Sir Gaylord
Sire Shareef Dancer (USA) 1980	Sweet Alliance (USA); 1974	Sir Ivor	Attica
Sire Shareef Dancer (USA) 1980	Sweet Alliance (USA); 1974	Mrs Peterkin	Tom Fool
Sire Shareef Dancer (USA) 1980	Sweet Alliance (USA); 1974	Mrs Peterkin	Legendra
Dam Possessive (GB) 1982	Posse (USA); 1977	Forli	Aristophanes
Dam Possessive (GB) 1982	Posse (USA); 1977	Forli	Trevisa
Dam Possessive (GB) 1982	Posse (USA); 1977	In Hot Pursuit	Bold Ruler
Dam Possessive (GB) 1982	Posse (USA); 1977	In Hot Pursuit	Lady Be Good
Dam Possessive (GB) 1982	Front Row (IRE); 1965	Epaulette	Court Martial
Dam Possessive (GB) 1982	Front Row (IRE); 1965	Epaulette	Golden Sari
Dam Possessive (GB) 1982	Front Row (IRE); 1965	Panaview	Panaslipper
Dam Possessive (GB) 1982	Front Row (IRE); 1965	Panaview	April View (Family: 42)
