= 1991 Prix de l'Arc de Triomphe =

- Location: Longchamp Racecourse
- Date: October 6, 1991
- Winning horse: Suave Dancer

The 1991 Prix de l'Arc de Triomphe was a horse race held at Longchamp on Sunday 6 October 1991. It was the 70th running of the Prix de l'Arc de Triomphe.

The winner was Suave Dancer, a three-year-old colt trained in France by John Hammond. The winning jockey was Cash Asmussen.

== Race details ==
- Sponsor: CIGA Hotels
- Purse: 8,500,000 F; First prize: 5,000,000 F
- Going: Good to Soft
- Distance: 2,400 metres
- Number of runners: 14
- Winner's time: 2m 31.4s

== Full result ==
Pos.	Marg.	Horse	Age	Jockey	Trainer (Country)
1		Suave Dancer	3	Cash Asmussen	John Hammond (FR)
2	2	Magic Night	3	Alain Badel	Philippe Demercastel (FR)
3	1	Pistolet Bleu	3	Dominique Boeuf	Élie Lellouche (FR)
4	3	Toulon	3	Pat Eddery	André Fabre (FR)
5	¾	Pigeon Voyageur	3	Thierry Jarnet	André Fabre (FR)
6	hd	In the Groove	4	Steve Cauthen	David Elsworth (GB)
7	1½	Quest for Fame	4	Walter Swinburn	Roger Charlton (GB)
8	¾	Generous	3	Alan Munro	Paul Cole (GB)
9	nse	El Senor	7	Michael Kinane	William Wright (USA)
10	2	Shamshir	3	Frankie Dettori	Luca Cumani (GB)
11	½	Miss Alleged	4	Éric Legrix	Pascal Bary (FR)
12	6	Art Bleu	4	Christophe Aubert	Élie Lellouche (FR)
13	5	Jet Ski Lady	3	Christy Roche	Jim Bolger (IRE)
14	6	Snurge	4	Richard Quinn	Paul Cole (GB)

- Abbreviations: nse = nose; hd = head

== Winner's details ==
Further details of the winner, Suave Dancer.

- Sex: Colt
- Foaled: 7 February 1988
- Country: United States
- Sire: Green Dancer; Dam: Suavite (Alleged)
- Owner: Henri Chalhoub
- Breeder: Lillie Webb
