= Paean (horse) =

British-bred Thoroughbred racehorse

- Sire: Bustino
- Grandsire: Busted
- Dam: Mixed Applause
- Damsire: Nijinsky
- Sex: Stallion
- Foaled: 4 April 1983
- Country: United Kingdom
- Colour: Bay
- Breeder: John Scott-Ellis, 9th Baron Howard de Walden
- Owner: Lord Howard de Walden
- Trainer: Henry Cecil
- Record: 11: 6-4-1

Major wins
- Ascot Gold Cup (1987)

Awards
- Timeform ratings: 87p (1985), 102 (1986), 123 (1987)

Paean (foaled 4 April 1983 – ca. 1989) was a British Thoroughbred racehorse and sire. A specialist over long distances he was ideally suited by soft ground on which he won the 1987 Ascot Gold Cup by a modern record margin of fifteen lengths. He had previously finished second on his only start as a two-year-old in 1985 and won five times as a three-year-old in 1986. Paean broke down with an injury after his Gold Cup win and never raced again. In a brief stud career he showed some promise as a sire of steeplechasers.

== Background ==
Paean was a bay horse with a large white star bred and owned by John Scott-Ellis, 9th Baron Howard de Walden a prominent member of the Jockey Club. Other horses to race in Lord Howard de Walden's apricot colours included Kris, Diesis and Slip Anchor. Paean was one of the best horses sired by Bustino, who won 1973 St Leger and the 1974 Coronation Cup as well as finishing second to Grundy in a famous race for the King George VI and Queen Elizabeth Stakes. Paean's dam Mixed Applause also produced the St James's Palace Stakes winner Shavian and, as a descendant of the broodmare My Game, was closely related to Marwell, Marling, Unite and Be My Chief.

Lord Howard de Walden sent his colt into training with Henry Cecil at his Warren Place Stable in Newmarket, Suffolk.

== Racing career ==
=== 1985: two-year-old season ===
Paean's only race as a two-year-old came in a twenty-runner maiden race at Newbury Racecourse in August. He took the lead approaching the final furlong but was caught in the closing stages and beaten a head by Kolgong Heights. Timeform commented that he would "stay at least 1 ¼ miles" and was "sure to win [a] similar contest".

=== 1986: three-year-old season ===
Paean developed into a successful racehorse at three, winning five of his seven races without being tested against top class opposition. He won a maiden race over eleven furlongs at Newbury and won minor races at Newcastle and Pontefract. At Beverley Racecourse in August he was moved up in distance and won a race for amateur riders by eight lengths. On his final appearance of the season he faced slightly better opposition in the George Stubbs Stakes over two miles at Newmarket Racecourse on 31 October and won by half a length from Rosedale, a colt who had finished second in the St. Leger Italiano.

=== 1987: four-year-old season ===
Paean began his third season by finishing third in a handicap race over fourteen furlong at Newmarket. He was then moved up in class to contest the Group Three Sagaro Stakes over two miles at Ascot Racecourse in May and finished second, beaten three quarters of a length by Sadeem.

Paean returned to Ascot on 18 June for the Group One Ascot Gold Cup over two and a half miles. In the buildup to the race, the Cecil stable's main hope appeared to be Bonhomie, a colt who had finished second in the previous year's Irish Derby. On the morning of the race however, the stable jockey Steve Cauthen, deciding that Bonhomie would be unsuited by the unusually soft ground, deserted the colt to take the ride on Paean. The seven-year-old gelding Valuable Witness started favourite ahead of Sadeem, with Paean third choice in the betting on 6/1, having been backed down from 14/1 at the start of the day. Paean took the lead half a mile from the finish and drew clear in the straight to win by fifteen lengths, by far the biggest winning margin in the race since the Second World War. His success was one of seven for Cecil at the four-day meeting. Less than a week after his win at Ascot, Paean sustained a serious tendon injury and was retired from racing.

== Assessment ==
In 1985 the independent Timeform organisation gave Paean a rating of 85p, the "p" indicating that he was likely to improve. The prediction proved correct as he achieved a rating of 102 in the following year and a peak rating of 123 in 1987. In the latter year, the official International Classification rated him the second best older stayer in Europe, three pounds behind the Premio Roma winner Orban.

In their book A Century of Champions, based on a modified version of the Timeform system, John Randall and Tony Morris rated Paean as a "poor" winner of the Gold Cup.

== Stud record ==
After his retirement from racing, Paean was sent to Ireland where he stood as a breeding stallion at the Greenville House Stud at Kilmacow, County Kilkenny. He was marketed as a National Hunt stallion and stood at a fee of IR£1,000 a mare. Paean survived only two seasons at stud but sired some good steeplechasers including the Whitbread Gold Cup winner Eulogy.

== Pedigree ==
Pedigree of Paean (GB), bay stallion, 1983
Sire Bustino (GB) 1971	Busted (GB); 1963	Crepello	Donatello
Sire Bustino (GB) 1971	Busted (GB); 1963	Crepello	Crepuscule
Sire Bustino (GB) 1971	Busted (GB); 1963	Sans Le Sou	Vimy
Sire Bustino (GB) 1971	Busted (GB); 1963	Sans Le Sou	Martial Loan
Sire Bustino (GB) 1971	Ship Yard (GB); 1963	Doutelle	Prince Chevalier
Sire Bustino (GB) 1971	Ship Yard (GB); 1963	Doutelle	Above Board
Sire Bustino (GB) 1971	Ship Yard (GB); 1963	Paving Stone	Fairway
Sire Bustino (GB) 1971	Ship Yard (GB); 1963	Paving Stone	Rosetta
Dam Mixed Applause (USA) 1976	Nijinsky (CAN); 1967	Northern Dancer	Nearctic
Dam Mixed Applause (USA) 1976	Nijinsky (CAN); 1967	Northern Dancer	Natalma
Dam Mixed Applause (USA) 1976	Nijinsky (CAN); 1967	Flaming Page	Bull Page
Dam Mixed Applause (USA) 1976	Nijinsky (CAN); 1967	Flaming Page	Flaring Top
Dam Mixed Applause (USA) 1976	My Advantage (GB); 1966	Princely Gift	Nasrullah
Dam Mixed Applause (USA) 1976	My Advantage (GB); 1966	Princely Gift	Blue Gem
Dam Mixed Applause (USA) 1976	My Advantage (GB); 1966	My Game	My Babu
Dam Mixed Applause (USA) 1976	My Advantage (GB); 1966	My Game	Flirting (Family: 14-c)
