= Balisada =

British-bred Thoroughbred racehorse

- Sire: Kris
- Grandsire: Sharpen Up
- Dam: Balnaha
- Damsire: Lomond
- Sex: Mare
- Foaled: 10 February 1996
- Country: United Kingdom
- Colour: Chestnut
- Breeder: Hascombe and Valiant Studs
- Owner: Anthony Oppenheimer
- Trainer: Geoff Wragg
- Record: 8: 2-3-1
- Earnings: £180,125

Major wins
- Coronation Stakes (1999)

Balisada (10 February 1996 – 20 July 2017) was a British Thoroughbred racehorse and broodmare. As a two-year-old in 1998 she competed in maiden races and won at her third attempt. In the following season she made rapid improvement and recorded a 16/1 upset victory in the Group One Coronation Stakes at Royal Ascot. She was beaten in her three remaining races and was retired to become a broodmare where she had some success as a dam of winners.

== Background ==
Balisada was a chestnut mare with a narrow white stripe bred in England by her owner Anthony Oppenheimer's Hascombe and Valiant Stud. Oppenheimer is a member of the family that controlled the De Beers Mining Company. She was sired by Kris the leading British miler of 1979 whose other progeny included the Triple Crown winner Oh So Sharp, and The Oaks winner Unite.

Balisada's dam Balnaha won one minor race from four attempts in 1993. She was a half-sister to the Falmouth Stakes winner Inchmurrin who produced the Greenham Stakes winner and successful stallion Inchinor

Balisada was sent into training with Geoff Wragg at his Abington Place stable in Newmarket, Suffolk. Like many of Wragg's trainees, she raced in a sheepskin noseband.

== Racing career ==
=== 1998: two-year-old season ===
In all three of her races as a two-year-old, Balisada was ridden by Kieren Fallon. On her racecourse debut at Great Yarmouth Racecourse on 16 September she contested a six furlong maiden race and finished second, three lengths behind the winner Subeen. She was made 4/7 favourite for a similar event at Newmarket Racecourse nineteen days later but started slowly and finished third of the thirteen runners behind the John Gosden-trained Georgette. On 26 October, the filly was moved up in distance for a seven furlong maiden on heavy ground at Lingfield Park and recorded her first success, taking the lead approaching the last quarter mile and winning by two and a half lengths from Heartwood.

=== 1999: three-year-old season ===
In 1999, the South African jockey Michael Roberts took over from Fallon and rode Balisada in all five of her races. The filly did not appear as a three-year-old until 20 May when she started at odds of 7/1 for the listed Conqueror Fillies' Stakes over a mile at Goodwood Racecourse and finished second, two lengths behind the winner Hawriyah. Despite never having previously contested a Group race, Balisada was then moved up to Group One level for the Coronation Stakes at Royal Ascot on 16 June. She started a 16/1 outsider (having been offered at odds of 40/1 on the morning of race) in a field of nine fillies which included Wannabe Grand (winner of the Cheveley Park Stakes and the 11/4 favourite), Valentine Waltz (Poule d'Essai des Pouliches), Hula Angel (Irish 1,000 Guineas), Golden Silca (Mill Reef Stakes), Hawriyah and the Godolphin runner Pescara. Balisada pulled against Roberts' attempts to restrain her before settling towards the rear of the field. She began to make progress when switched to the outside in the straight and accelerated strongly approaching the final furlong. She took the lead 100 yards from the finish and won by one and three quarter lengths from Golden Silca, with Wannabe Grand and Valentine Waltz dead-heating for third. After the race Wragg said "I saw the 40 to 1 and I thought 'Jesus, they must be taking the piss'. She was going to be my Guineas filly but then she threw a curb and I had to stop. She wasn't fully fit at Goodwood and the delay has turned into a blessing in disguise as she has really improved." Roberts, who was winning for the first time in 40 rides at Royal Ascot said "This filly works at home with speed, but this was exceptional. I think she peaked today".

In July, Balisada, carrying 124 pounds, was made 15/8 favourite for the Group Two Falmouth Stakes at Newmarket, ahead of Cape Verdi (133 pounds) who had won the 1000 Guineas by five lengths and started favourite for The Derby. After being held up by Roberts in the early stages, she overtook Cape Verdi a furlong out but was overtaken and beaten into second by the French-trained Ronda. In her last two races Balisada was matched against colts and older horses. Three after the Falmouth Stakes she finished fourth in the Sussex Stakes at Goodwood and finished fourth of the thirteen runners, six and three quarter lengths behind the winners Aljabr. After a break of two months, the filly returned for the Queen Elizabeth II Stakes at Ascot Racecourse where she finished tailed-off last of the four runners behind Dubai Millennium. Wragg and Roberts felt that she had been unsuited by the heavy ground.

== Breeding record ==
Balisada was retired from racing to become a broodmare for Oppenheimer's stud. She has produced at least eleven foals and four winners:

- Bradamante, a bay filly, foaled in 2001, sired by Sadler's Wells. Won one race.
- Watchtower, chestnut colt, 2002, by Dubai Millennium. Fourth in only race.
- Galactic Star, chestnut colt, 2003, by Galileo. Sold for 700,000 guineas as a yearling. Won four races including the Listed Godolphin Stakes.
- Blues Ballad, brown colt, 2004, by Singspiel. Won three races in the UAE.
- Green Diamond, bay colt (later gelded), 2005, by Green Desert. Failed to win in 13 races.
- Sabi Star, colt, 2006, by Green Desert. Failed to win in two races.
- Magic Nymph, filly, 2008, by Galileo. Unraced.
- El Salvador, chestnut colt, 2009, by Galileo. Won seven races including the Irish Cesarewitch.
- Marmalade Cat, filly, 2010, by Duke of Marmalade. Unraced
- Kugelblitz, chestnut colt, 2011, by Dubawi
- Kummiya, colt, 2013, by Dansili

== Pedigree ==
Pedigree of Balisada (GB), chestnut mare, 1996
Sire Kris (GB) 1976	Sharpen Up (GB); 1969	Atan	Native Dancer
Sire Kris (GB) 1976	Sharpen Up (GB); 1969	Atan	Mixed Marriage
Sire Kris (GB) 1976	Sharpen Up (GB); 1969	Rocchetta	Rockfella
Sire Kris (GB) 1976	Sharpen Up (GB); 1969	Rocchetta	Chambiges
Sire Kris (GB) 1976	Doubly Sure (GB); 1971	Reliance	Tantieme
Sire Kris (GB) 1976	Doubly Sure (GB); 1971	Reliance	Relance
Sire Kris (GB) 1976	Doubly Sure (GB); 1971	Soft Angels	Crepello
Sire Kris (GB) 1976	Doubly Sure (GB); 1971	Soft Angels	Sweet Angel
Dam Balnaha (GB) 1990	Lomond (USA); 1980	Northern Dancer	Nearctic
Dam Balnaha (GB) 1990	Lomond (USA); 1980	Northern Dancer	Natalma
Dam Balnaha (GB) 1990	Lomond (USA); 1980	My Charmer	Poker
Dam Balnaha (GB) 1990	Lomond (USA); 1980	My Charmer	Fair Charmer
Dam Balnaha (GB) 1990	On Show (GB); 1978	Welsh Pageant	Tudor Melody
Dam Balnaha (GB) 1990	On Show (GB); 1978	Welsh Pageant	Picture Light
Dam Balnaha (GB) 1990	On Show (GB); 1978	African Dancer	Nijinsky
Dam Balnaha (GB) 1990	On Show (GB); 1978	African Dancer	Miba (Family: 7-a)
