= Magnificent Star =

American-bred Thoroughbred racehorse

- Sire: Silver Hawk
- Grandsire: Roberto
- Dam: Gulanar
- Damsire: Val de Loir
- Sex: Mare
- Foaled: 5 March 1988
- Country: United States
- Colour: Bay
- Breeder: Buckram Oak Farm
- Owner: Ecurie Fustok
- Trainer: Mohammed Moubarak
- Record: 10: 2-1-1
- Earnings: £94,409

Major wins
- Fillies' Trial Stakes (1991); Yorkshire Oaks (1991)

Magnificent Star (foaled 5 March 1988) was an American-bred, British-trained Thoroughbred racehorse and broodmare best known for her win in the 1991 Yorkshire Oaks. She was unraced as a two-year-old and was beaten on her first two starts of 1991 before winning the Listed Fillies' Trial Stakes. She then finished fifth in The Oaks and second in the Glorious Stakes before recording an upset victory over a strong field in the Yorkshire Oaks. She never won again and was retired from racing at the end of 1992. She had modest success as a dam of winners.

== Background ==
Magnificent Star was a bay mare bred in Kentucky by her owner, Mahmoud Fustok's Buckram Oak Farm. Fustok was a Lebanese businessman who had established a Thoroughbred breeding operation in the United States in the late 1970s: his most successful horse was probably Green Forest. Magnificent Star was sired by Silver Hawk, an American-bred colt who finished third in the 1982 Epsom Derby and later became a successful breeding stallion, siring the 1997 Epsom Derby winner Benny the Dip, the 1999 St Leger winner Mutafaweq and the leading American turf performer Hawkster. Her dam Gulanar was an Irish-bred mare who raced in Italy and had previously produced Mysterious Etoile, a filly who won the Prix de la Grotte finished second in the 1983 Poule d'Essai des Pouliches. Gulanar was descendant of Star of Shiraz, a half-sister to Petite Etoile.

During her racing career, Magnificent Star was trained at Newmarket, Suffolk by Mohammed Moubarak.

== Racing career ==
=== 1991: three-year-old season ===
As a three-year-old in 1991 Magnificent Star was ridden in all of her races by the Hong Kong-born jockey Tony Cruz. Having been unraced as a juvenile, she made her racecourse debut in a seven furlong maiden race at Newbury Racecourse on 21 April. Starting a 20/1 outsider she finished fifth of the seventeen runners behind Umniyatee, a filly who went on to finish third in the Irish 1000 Guineas. On 6 May she started odds-on favourite for a similar event over one mile at Windsor Racecourse but was beaten into third place behind Fly To The Moon and Dizzy. Despite her two defeats, Magnificent Star was moved up in class for the Listed Fillies' Trial Stakes over ten furlongs at Newbury on 17 May. The Michael Stoute-trained Fennel started favourite ahead of Shaima (runner-up in the Listed Radley Stakes), Silver Braid (runner-up in the Fred Darling Stakes) and the Newmarket maiden winner Shihama with Magnificent Star next in the betting on 7/1 alongside the May Hill Stakes winner Majmu. She turned into the straight in third place behind fennel before being driven through a narrow gap by Cruz approaching the final furlong. She took the lead in the closing stages and won by two lengths from the outsider Positive Acclaim with Majmu three quarters of a length away in third.

On 8 June Magnificent Star was one on nine filles to run in the 213th running of the Oaks Stakes over one and a half miles at Epsom Downs Racecourse. Starting at odds of 16/1 she was in eighth place entering the straight before staying on in the closing stages to finish fifth behind Jet Ski Lady, Shamshir, Shadayid and Jaffa Line. In the Group Three Glorious Stakes at Goodwood Racecourse on 2 August she was matched against colts and older horses and started 2/1 favourite against four opponents. She led for most of the way but was overtaken in the final furlong and beaten three quarters of a length by the gelding Fly Away Soon.

Magnificent Star's next race was the Yorkshire Oaks at York Racecourse on 21 August in which she again faced Jet Ski Lady and Shamshir. The favourite was Possessive Dancer who had won the Oaks d'Italia before beating Jet Ski Lady in the Irish Oaks whilst the other fancied runners were Third Watch (Ribblesdale Stakes) and Gussy Marlowe (Musidora Stakes). Magnificent Star was offered at 16/1 with only the 50/1 outsider Fife starting at longer odds in the seven-runner field. Cruz tracked the leaders before moving the filly forward along the inside rail in the last quarter mile. The final furlong saw Magnificent Star and Jet Ski Lady draw away from the field, with the outsider prevailing in the final stride to win by a short head. There was a gap of five lengths back to Shamshir in third place.

On her final appearance of the season, Magnificent Star was sent to France for the Prix Vermeille over 2400 metres at Longchamp Racecourse in September. After reaching third place in the straight she weakened in the closing stages and finished fifth of the fourteen runners behind Magic Night.

=== 1992: four-year-old season ===
Magnificent Star remained in training as a four-year-old but was badly affected by a viral infection early in the year and did not race until August. The filly failed to recover her best form and made little impact in three starts. She finished seventh behind Magic Night in the Prix de Pomone, last of eight behind User Friendly in the Yorkshire Oaks and ninth behind Niodini in the Park Hill Stakes.

== Breeding record ==
Magnificent Star was retired from racing to become a broodmare. She produced at least nine foals and four minor winners between 1995 and 2007:

- Profiler, a dark bay or brown colt (later gelded), foaled in 1995, sired by Capote. Won three races.
- Cryptoshootingstar, dark bay or brown filly, 1997, by Cryptoclearance
- Dunshara, bay filly, 1998, by Dayjur
- Sir Alfred, bay colt (later gelded), 1999, by Royal Academy. Won two races.
- Patrixprial, grey colt (later gelded), 2001, by Linamix. Won one race.
- Hilal, grey colt (later gelded), 2002, by Linamix. Failed to win in six races.
- Quite A Fella, colt (later gelded), 2005, by Swain. Won one race.
- Magic Street, dark bay or brown filly, 2006, by Street Cry
- Shine Star, chestnut filly, 2007, by Leroidesanimaux

== Pedigree ==
Pedigree of Magnificent Star (USA), bay mare, 1988
Sire Silver Hawk (USA) 1979	Roberto (USA); 1969	Hail To Reason	Turn-To
Sire Silver Hawk (USA) 1979	Roberto (USA); 1969	Hail To Reason	Nothirdchance
Sire Silver Hawk (USA) 1979	Roberto (USA); 1969	Bramalea	Nashua
Sire Silver Hawk (USA) 1979	Roberto (USA); 1969	Bramalea	Rarelea
Sire Silver Hawk (USA) 1979	Gris Vitesse (USA); 1966	Amerigo	Nearco
Sire Silver Hawk (USA) 1979	Gris Vitesse (USA); 1966	Amerigo	Sanlinea
Sire Silver Hawk (USA) 1979	Gris Vitesse (USA); 1966	Matchiche	Mat de Cocagne
Sire Silver Hawk (USA) 1979	Gris Vitesse (USA); 1966	Matchiche	Chimere Fabuleuse
Dam Gulanar (IRE) 1974	Val de Loir (FR); 1959	Vieux Manoir	Brantome
Dam Gulanar (IRE) 1974	Val de Loir (FR); 1959	Vieux Manoir	Vielle Maison
Dam Gulanar (IRE) 1974	Val de Loir (FR); 1959	Vali	Sunny Boy
Dam Gulanar (IRE) 1974	Val de Loir (FR); 1959	Vali	Her Slipper
Dam Gulanar (IRE) 1974	Gulab (FR); 1966	Prince Bio	Prince Rose
Dam Gulanar (IRE) 1974	Gulab (FR); 1966	Prince Bio	Biologie
Dam Gulanar (IRE) 1974	Gulab (FR); 1966	Esmerald	Sunny Boy
Dam Gulanar (IRE) 1974	Gulab (FR); 1966	Esmerald	Star of Shiraz (Family 9-c)

- Through her dam Gulanar, Magnificent Star was inbred 4 × 4 to Sunny Boy, meaning that this stallion appears twice in the fourth generation of her pedigree.
