= Selkirk (horse) =

American-bred Thoroughbred racehorse

- Selkirk during his stud retirement in the 1990s. (Courtesy of Lanwades Stud)
- Sire: Sharpen Up
- Grandsire: Atan
- Dam: Annie Edge
- Damsire: Nebbiolo
- Sex: Stallion
- Foaled: February 19, 1988
- Country: United States (bred); Europe (raced)
- Colour: Chestnut
- Breeder: George W. Strawbridge Jr.
- Owner: George W. Strawbridge Jr.
- Trainer: Ian Balding
- Jockey: John Reid; Ray Cochrane
- Record: 15:6-2-3
- Earnings: US$843,661 £519080.15

Major wins
- Stardom Stakes (1990); Fortune Stakes (1991); Queen Elizabeth II Stakes (1991); Celebration Mile (1992); Lockinge Stakes (1992); Challenge Stakes (1992)

Honours
- Timeform's European champion miler (1991, 1992)

Selkirk (February 19, 1988 – January 3, 2013) was an American-bred Thoroughbred race horse and sire who raced mainly in Europe. Bred in Pennsylvania and owned by American philanthropist businessman George W. Strawbridge Jr., he was trained by Ian Balding. At the end of 1991, his third year, he had a record of 3-1-2 out of seven starts. In total, he had won six of his 15 starts. He retired from racing in 1993 and began his stud career at Kirsten Rausing's Lanwades stud farm in Newmarket, England, where he sired 92 stakes winners from 987 foals. He died on January 3, 2013, at the age of 25.

== Background ==
Selkirk was a chestnut horse with a white blaze and long white socks on his hind legs, bred in Pennsylvania by his owner George Strawbridge. He was sired by Sharpen Up, a British racehorse who won the Middle Park Stakes in 1971 before becoming a successful breeding stallion. His other progeny included Pebbles, Kris and Diesis. Selkirk's dam, Annie Edge was a successful racemare for Strawbridge on both sides of the Atlantic, winning the Park Stakes in 1983, and the New York Stakes a year later. Strawbridge sent his colt to be raced in Europe and trained at Ian Balding's Kingsclere training facility near Watership Down, Hampshire, England.

== Racing career ==
=== 1990: two-year-old season ===
Selkirk never contested a maiden race, instead starting his career in a Listed stakes event. On September 14 Selkirk won his debut race in the Stardom Stakes at Goodwood by four lengths with a time of 1m 38.56s. He was immediately moved up to the highest level for the Group One Grand Critérium at Longchamp on October 6 in which finished fourth at around three lengths behind champion Hector Protector.

=== 1991: three-year-old season ===
In the first half of the year, Selkirk had begun to experience pain and his racing began to falter. Veterinarian Simon Knapp discovered that the horse had an un-descended or trapped testicle. Surgery and subsequent recovery was required.

On September 6, Selkirk returned to racing. The Milcars Temple Fortune Stakes at Kempton Park was his first impressive win as he broke the course record by almost three seconds, winning by five lengths with a time of 1m 36.43s. Both owner and trainer took the win as a sign Selkirk was not only back in racing form, but also more improved. He was entered into the Queen Elizabeth II Stakes at Ascot on September 28 against the best milers of Europe, such as Kooyonga and Shadayid. Selkirk won that race by 1 1/2 lengths at a time of 1m 44.34s.

His previous victory allowed him to be highweighted at the 1991 English Free Handicap at 7 to 9 1/2 furlongs. He received his first honor in 1991 as Timeform named him Europe's Champion Miler. This honor followed him into his fourth year and 1992.

=== 1992: four-year-old season ===
On his first appearance of the new season Selkirk won the Lockinge Stakes at Newbury on May 15 by 2 1/2 lengths over Lahib (1m 36.99s). In July he finished second to Marling by only a head in the Sussex Stakes, and on August 29 he won the Celebration Mile (1m 41.72s) by 2 1/2 over Steinbeck, the latter two races at Goodwood. Selkirk was set to become the first horse since Brigadier Gerard in 1972 to win consecutive runnings of the Queen Elizabeth II Stakes, but his regular jockey Ray Cochrane had been suspended. Former jockey John Reid and Selkirk finished third. His next 2 1/2-length finish came on October 15 at Newmarket in the seven-furlong Challenge Stakes with a time of 1m 22.27s over Thourios. Native-American Selkirk finished his racing career on October 31 at Gulfstream Park at the Breeders' Cup Mile. The tight turns and high humidity of the track proved difficult for Selkirk and he came in fifth across the wire, five lengths behind winner Lure.

== Stud career ==
At the age of five, Selkirk retired to Kirsten Rausing's Lanwades Stud farm in Newmarket, England. The horse's stud fee in 1993 was US$32,506 (£20,000). That price had doubled by 2005. Within 20 years, he had sired 92 stakes winners from 987 foals, 16 of which became Grade/Group 1 winners and two top line winners. His most successful offspring included Classic winners Wince and Kastoria as well as Nahrain, Cityscape, Sublimity and the Pretty Polly Stakes winner Thistle Bird.

== Death ==
Selkirk died of old age on January 3, 2013. Of his death, Kirsten Rausing stated: "We will greatly miss him, but his memory will live on, not only here at the stud, but throughout the Thoroughbred industry in this country and abroad." Former trainer Ian Balding added: "He was a wonderful racehorse first and then went on to prove himself as a champion stallion ... He was just a lovely horse to have anything to do with. Most people used to say he wanted soft ground but he went on anything."

== Career races ==
Date	Race & Course (# furlongs)	Race Outcome*	Winning Time (mins:secs)	Jockey
September 14, 1990	Stardom Stakes at Goodwood (8)	1/5, 4 lengths ahead Balaat	1:38.56	John Reid
October 6, 1990	Grand Critérium at Longchamp (8)	4/5, 5 3/4 behind Hector Protector	1:41.10	John Reid
March 30, 1991	Easter Stakes at Kempton Park (8)	2/10, 2 b. Corrupt	1:41.63	John Reid
May 11, 1991	Lingfield Derby Trial at Lingfield Park (11)	3/8, 5 b. Corrupt	2:27.01	John Reid
May 21, 1991	Predominate Stakes at Goodwood (10)	3/8, 1 b. Man From Eldorado	2:7.98	John Reid
June 29, 1991	Royal Mail Stakes at Newcastle (8)	4/7, 2 1/2 b. Radwell	1:40.47	Ray Cochrane
September 6, 1991	Milcars Temple Fortune Stakes at Kempton Park (8)	1/14, 5 a. Susurration	1:36.43**	Ray Cochrane
September 28, 1991	Queen Elizabeth II Stakes at Ascot (8)	1/9, 1 1/2 a. Kooyonga	1:44.34	Ray Cochrane
May 15, 1992	Lockinge Stakes at Newbury (8)	1/10, 2 1/2 a. Lahib	1:36.99	Ray Cochrane
May 31, 1992	Prix d'Ispahan at Longchamp (9)	6/11, 6 b. Zoman	1:54.60	Ray Cochrane
June 29, 1992	Sussex Stakes at Goodwood (8)	2/8, head b. Marling	1:36.68	Ray Cochrane
August 29, 1992	Celebration Mile at Goodwood (8)	1/7, 2 1/2 a. Steinbeck	1:41.72	Ray Cochrane
September 26, 1992	Queen Elizabeth II Stakes at Ascot (8)	3/9, 3 1/2 b. Lahib	1:44.50	John Reid
October 15, 1992	Challenge Stakes at Newmarket (7)	1/8, 2 1/2 a. Thourios	1:22.27	Ray Cochrane
October 31, 1992	Breeders' Cup Mile at Gulfstream Park (8)	5/5, 5 1/4 b. Lure	1:32.80	Ray Cochrane

* Place finished, distance won/lost by.
** A course record at the time.

== Pedigree ==
Pedigree of Selkirk, chestnut stallion, 1988
Sire Sharpen Up, ch 1969 8.9f	Atan, ch 1961	Native Dancer, br. 1950	Polynesian, br. 1942
Sire Sharpen Up, ch 1969 8.9f	Atan, ch 1961	Native Dancer, br. 1950	Geisha, gr. 1942
Sire Sharpen Up, ch 1969 8.9f	Atan, ch 1961	Mixed Marriage	Tudor Minstrel
Sire Sharpen Up, ch 1969 8.9f	Atan, ch 1961	Mixed Marriage	Persian Maid
Sire Sharpen Up, ch 1969 8.9f	Rocchetta, ch 1995	Rockefella	Hyperion
Sire Sharpen Up, ch 1969 8.9f	Rocchetta, ch 1995	Rockefella	Rockfel
Sire Sharpen Up, ch 1969 8.9f	Rocchetta, ch 1995	Chambiges	Majano
Sire Sharpen Up, ch 1969 8.9f	Rocchetta, ch 1995	Chambiges	Chanterelle
Dam Annie Edge, ch 1980	Nebbiolo, 12.6f	Yellow God	Red God
Dam Annie Edge, ch 1980	Nebbiolo, 12.6f	Yellow God	Sally Deans
Dam Annie Edge, ch 1980	Nebbiolo, 12.6f	Novara	Birkhahn
Dam Annie Edge, ch 1980	Nebbiolo, 12.6f	Novara	Norbelle
Dam Annie Edge, ch 1980	Friendly Court	Be Friendly	Skymaster
Dam Annie Edge, ch 1980	Friendly Court	Be Friendly	Lady Sliptic
Dam Annie Edge, ch 1980	Friendly Court	No Court	Court Harwell
Dam Annie Edge, ch 1980	Friendly Court	No Court	Tiger's Bay
