= Celebration Mile =

Flat horse race in Britain

- Class: Group 2
- Location: Goodwood Racecourse; W. Sussex, England
- Inaugurated: 1967
- Race type: Flat
- Sponsor: William Hill
- Website: Goodwood

Race information
- Distance: 1 mile (1,609 metres)
- Surface: Turf
- Track: Right-handed
- Qualification: Three-years-old and up
- Weight: 9 st 0 lb (3yo); 9 st 6 lb (4yo+); Allowances; 3 lb for fillies and mares Penalties; 5 lb for Group 1 winners * 3 lb for Group 2 winners * * after 2021
- Purse: £125,000 (2022); 1st: £70,888

Celebration Mile
2026
| Zavateri | Qirat | Fast Tracker |

Previous years
2025
Jonquil | Saqqara Sands | Arisaig
2024
Ice Max | Poker Face | Royal Dress
2023
Angel Bleu | Knight | Charyn
2022
Jadoomi | Finest Sound | Escobar
2021
Lavender's Blue | Benbatl | Pogo

2020-2011
2020
Century Dream | Sir Busker | Regal Reality
2019
Duke Of Hazzard | Turgenev | Happy Power
2018
Beat The Bank | Whisky Baron | Stormy Antarctic
2017
Lightning Spear | Zonderland | Hathal
2016
Lightning Spear | Zonderland | Arod
2015
Kodi Bear | Gabrial | Breton Rock
2014
Bow Creek | Emell | Captain Cat
2013
Afsare | Stipulate | Trade Storm
2012
Premio Loco | Thistle Bird | Aljamaaheer
2011
Dubawi Gold | Set The Trend | Beacon Lodge

2010-2001
2010
Poet's Voice | Main Aim | Summer Fete
2009
Delegator | Zacinto | Ordnance Row
2008
Raven's Pass | Bankable | Third Set
2007
Echelon | Cesare | Blue Ksar
2006
Caradak | Killybegs | George Washington
2005
Chic | Majors Cast | Court Masterpiece
2004
Chic | Nayyir | Hurricane Alan
2003
Priors Lodge | Passing Glance | Tillerman
2002
Tillerman | Redback | Reel Buddy
2001
No Excuse Needed | Tamburlaine | Late Night Out

2000-1991
2000
Medicean | Observatory | Cape Town
1999
Cape Cross | Josr Algarhoud | Almushtarak
1998
Muhtathir | Almushtarak | Lovers Knot
1997
Among Men | Polar Prince | Peartree House
1996
Mark Of Esteem | Bishop Of Cashel | Alhaarth
1995
Harayir | Darnay | Realities
1994
Mehthaaf | Emperor Jones | Turtle Island
1993
Swing Low | Mistle Cat | Emperor Jones
1992
Selkirk | Steinbeck | Rudimentary
1991
Bold Russian | Flashfoot | Crystal Path

1990-1988
1990
Shavian | Candy Glen | Lord Florey
1989
Distant Relative | Great Commotion | Reprimand
1988
Prince Rupert | Then Again | Doyoun

The Celebration Mile is a Group 2 flat horse race in Great Britain open to horses aged three years or older. It is run at Goodwood over a distance of 1 mile (1,609 metres), and it is scheduled to take place each year in late August.

== History ==
The event was established in 1967, and it was originally called the Wills Mile. It was renamed the Goodwood Mile in 1971, and from this point it was classed at Group 3 level.

The race became known as the Waterford Crystal Mile in 1975, and it was promoted to Group 2 status in 1977. It was given its present title in 1989.

The leading horses from the Celebration Mile often go on to compete in the Queen Elizabeth II Stakes. The last to win both in the same year was Poet's Voice in 2010.

== Records ==
Most successful horse (2 wins):

- Chic – 2004, 2005
- Lightning Spear - 2016, 2017

Leading jockey (4 wins):

- Joe Mercer – Brigadier Gerard (1971), Sallust (1972), Captain James (1978), Kris (1979)
- Willie Carson – Known Fact (1980), Bold Russian (1991), Mehthaaf (1994), Harayir (1995)
- Greville Starkey – To-Agori-Mou (1981), Sandhurst Prince (1982), Rousillon (1984), Then Again (1986)

Leading trainer (8 wins):

- Sir Michael Stoute – Milligram (1987), Among Men (1997), Medicean (2000), No Excuse Needed (2001), Chic (2004, 2005), Echelon (2007), Zacinto (2009)

== Winners ==
| Year | Winner | Age | Jockey | Trainer | Time |
|---|---|---|---|---|---|
| 1967 | St Chad | 3 | George Moore | Noel Murless | 1:44.00 |
| 1968 | Jimmy Reppin | 3 | Geoff Lewis | John Sutcliffe, Jr. | 1:39.20 |
| 1969 | Habitat | 3 | Lester Piggott | Fulke Johnson Houghton | 1:42.00 |
| 1970 | Humble Duty | 3 | Duncan Keith | Peter Walwyn | 1:39.30 |
| 1971 | Brigadier Gerard | 3 | Joe Mercer | Dick Hern | 1:42.07 |
| 1972 | Sallust | 3 | Joe Mercer | Dick Hern | 1:39.43 |
| 1973 | Jacinth | 3 | John Gorton | Bruce Hobbs | 1:38.32 |
| 1974 | Pitcairn | 3 | Ron Hutchinson | John Dunlop | 1:42.84 |
| 1975 | Gay Fandango | 3 | Pat Eddery | Vincent O'Brien | 1:42.24 |
| 1976 | Free State | 3 | Pat Eddery | Peter Walwyn | 1:39.44 |
| 1977 | Be My Guest | 3 | Lester Piggott | Vincent O'Brien | 1:46.28 |
| 1978 | Captain James | 4 | Joe Mercer | Seamus McGrath | 1:39.70 |
| 1979 (Note: The 1979 running took place at Ascot) | Kris | 3 | Joe Mercer | Henry Cecil | 1:43.00 |
| 1980 | Known Fact | 3 | Willie Carson | Jeremy Tree | 1:41.32 |
| 1981 | To-Agori-Mou | 3 | Greville Starkey | Guy Harwood | 1:38.59 |
| 1982 | Sandhurst Prince | 3 | Greville Starkey | Guy Harwood | 1:38.74 |
| 1983 | Montekin | 4 | Brian Rouse | John Dunlop | 1:39.27 |
| 1984 | Rousillon | 3 | Greville Starkey | Guy Harwood | 1:43.12 |
| 1985 | Abandoned due to waterlogging |
| 1986 | Then Again | 3 | Greville Starkey | Luca Cumani | 1:39.92 |
| 1987 | Milligram | 3 | Walter Swinburn | Michael Stoute | 1:36.80 |
| 1988 | Prince Rupert | 4 | Michael Hills | Barry Hills | 1:41.50 |
| 1989 | Distant Relative | 3 | Michael Hills | Barry Hills | 1:40.08 |
| 1990 | Shavian | 3 | Steve Cauthen | Henry Cecil | 1:37.05 |
| 1991 | Bold Russian | 4 | Willie Carson | Barry Hills | 1:39.33 |
| 1992 | Selkirk | 4 | Ray Cochrane | Ian Balding | 1:41.72 |
| 1993 | Swing Low | 4 | John Reid | Richard Hannon Sr. | 1:38.94 |
| 1994 | Mehthaaf | 3 | Willie Carson | John Dunlop | 1:39.12 |
| 1995 | Harayir | 3 | Willie Carson | Dick Hern | 1:36.73 |
| 1996 | Mark of Esteem | 3 | Frankie Dettori | Saeed bin Suroor | 1:41.18 |
| 1997 | Among Men (Note: Cape Cross finished first in 1997, but he was relegated to last place following a stewards' inquiry) | 3 | Michael Kinane | Michael Stoute | 1:38.34 |
| 1998 | Muhtathir | 3 | Richard Hills | John Gosden | 1:38.46 |
| 1999 | Cape Cross | 5 | John Reid | Saeed bin Suroor | 1:38.64 |
| 2000 | Medicean | 3 | Pat Eddery | Sir Michael Stoute | 1:38.65 |
| 2001 | No Excuse Needed | 3 | Kieren Fallon | Sir Michael Stoute | 1:38.23 |
| 2002 | Tillerman | 6 | Richard Hughes | Amanda Perrett | 1:38.13 |
| 2003 | Priors Lodge | 5 | Willie Ryan | Marcus Tregoning | 1:37.63 |
| 2004 | Chic | 4 | Kieren Fallon | Sir Michael Stoute | 1:43.22 |
| 2005 | Chic | 5 | Ryan Moore | Sir Michael Stoute | 1:37.89 |
| 2006 | Caradak | 5 | Frankie Dettori | Saeed bin Suroor | 1:37.26 |
| 2007 | Echelon | 5 | Ryan Moore | Sir Michael Stoute | 1:38.97 |
| 2008 | Raven's Pass | 3 | Jimmy Fortune | John Gosden | 1:39.30 |
| 2009 | Zacinto (Note: Delegator was first in 2009, but he was subsequently disqualified after testing positive for a banned substance) | 3 | Ryan Moore | Sir Michael Stoute | 1:41.54 |
| 2010 | Poet's Voice | 3 | Frankie Dettori | Saeed bin Suroor | 1:39.22 |
| 2011 | Dubawi Gold | 3 | Richard Hughes | Richard Hannon Sr. | 1:39.16 |
| 2012 | Premio Loco | 8 | George Baker | Chris Wall | 1:41.21 |
| 2013 | Afsare | 6 | Andrea Atzeni | Luca Cumani | 1:38.60 |
| 2014 | Bow Creek | 3 | Joe Fanning | Mark Johnston | 1:37.76 |
| 2015 | Kodi Bear | 3 | Gérald Mossé | Clive Cox | 1:39.46 |
| 2016 | Lightning Spear | 5 | Oisin Murphy | David Simcock | 1:35.96 |
| 2017 | Lightning Spear | 6 | Oisin Murphy | David Simcock | 1:38.89 |
| 2018 | Beat The Bank | 4 | Oisin Murphy | Andrew Balding | 1:37.12 |
| 2019 | Duke Of Hazzard | 3 | Rossa Ryan | Paul Cole | 1:37.47 |
| 2020 | Century Dream | 6 | James Doyle | Simon & Ed Crisford | 1:40.38 |
| 2021 | Lavender's Blue | 5 | Rob Hornby | Amanda Perrett | 1:36.21 |
| 2022 | Jadoomi | 4 | William Buick | Simon & Ed Crisford | 1:40.86 |
| 2023 | Angel Bleu | 4 | Hector Crouch | Ralph Beckett | 1:44.67 |
| 2024 | Ice Max | 3 | Clifford Lee | Karl Burke | 1:43.95 |
| 2025 | Jonquil | 3 | Colin Keane | Andrew Balding | 1:36.80 |
| 2026 | Zavateri | 3 | Charles Bishop | Eve Johnson Houghton | 1:43.91 |

== See also ==
- Horse racing in Great Britain
- List of British flat horse races
- Recurring sporting events established in 1967 – this race is included under its original title, Wills Mile.
