= Geoff Wragg =

British horse trainer

Geoff Wragg (9 January 1930 – 15 September 2017) was a horse trainer who trained champion thoroughbred horses such as Teenoso and Pentire. He was the son of former jockey and trainer Harry Wragg, from whom he took over the licence at Abington Place, Newmarket in 1983. Wragg retired in 2008 after 25 years of training and sold Abington Place to Mohammed bin Khalifa Al Maktoum the following spring. He relocated to Yorkshire, the birthplace of his father. He died in 2017.

In his first season as a trainer Teenoso won The Derby under Lester Piggott. Other notable horses he trained include Arcadian Heights, Owington, First Island, First Trump, Pentire, and Cassandra Go. Owners he worked for included Anthony Oppenheimer.

Wragg died at Newmarket on 15 September 2017 at the age of 87.

== Major wins ==
(United Kingdom) Great Britain

- Ascot Gold Cup – (1) – Arcadian Heights (1994)
- Cheveley Park Stakes – (1) – Marling (1991)
- Child Stakes – (1) – Inchmurrin (1988)
- Cork and Orrery Stakes – (1) – Owington (1994)
- Coronation Stakes – (3) – Marling (1992), Rebecca Sharp (1997), Balisada (1999)
- Derby – (1) – Teenoso (1983)
- July Cup – (1) – Owington (1994)
- King George VI and Queen Elizabeth Stakes – (2) – Teenoso (1984), Pentire (1996)
- King's Stand Stakes – (1) – Cassandra Go (2001)
- Lockinge Stakes – (2) – Most Welcome (1989), First Island (1997)
- Middle Park Stakes – (1) – First Trump (1993)
- Nassau Stakes – (1) – Ela Romara (1988)
- Prince of Wales's Stakes – (1) – First Island (1996)
- Queen Anne Stakes – (1) – Nicolotte (1995)
- Sun Chariot Stakes – (2) – Braiswick (1989), Danceabout (2000)
- Sussex Stakes – (2) – Marling (1992), First Island (1996)

Canada

- E. P. Taylor Stakes – (1) – Braiswick (1989)

France

- Grand Prix de Saint-Cloud – (1) – Teenoso (1984)
- Prix d'Ispahan – (1) – Sasuru (1997)

Hong Kong

- Hong Kong Cup – (1) – First Island (1996)

(Republic of Ireland) Ireland

- Irish 1,000 Guineas – (1) – Marling (1992)
- Irish Champion Stakes – (1) – Pentire (1995)

Italy

- Premio Vittorio di Capua – (1) – Nicolotte (1995)
