= First Island =

Irish-bred Thoroughbred racehorse

- Sire: Dominion
- Grandsire: Derring-Do
- Dam: Caymana
- Damsire: Bellypha
- Sex: Stallion
- Foaled: 21 February 1992
- Country: Ireland
- Colour: Chestnut
- Breeder: Citadel Stud
- Owner: Mollers Racing
- Trainer: Geoff Wragg
- Record: 20:8-4-3
- Earnings: £709,989

Major wins
- Doncaster Mile Stakes (1996); Prince of Wales's Stakes (1996); Sussex Stakes (1996); Hong Kong Cup (1996); Lockinge Stakes (1997)

First Island (21 February 1992 – June 1997) was an Irish-bred, British-trained Thoroughbred racehorse. He showed unexceptional form in his early racing career but emerged as a top-class racehorse as a four-year-old in 1996, winning the Prince of Wales's Stakes and Sussex Stakes before becoming the first European-trained horse to win the Hong Kong Cup. He returned in 1997 to win the Lockinge Stakes, but died a month later at the age of five. In all, he won eight times and was placed on a further seven occasions in a career of twenty races.

== Background ==
First Island was a chestnut horse with a narrow white blaze and three white socks bred by the Citadel Stud of Knocklong, County Limerick. He was sired by Dominion, a racehorse who competed on both sides of the Atlantic, finishing third in the 2000 Guineas in 1975 and winning the Bernard Baruch Handicap three years later. He sired several good horses over a wide range of distances including the sprinter Primo Dominie (Coventry Stakes), Embla (Cheveley Park Stakes) and the stayer Trainglot (Cesarewitch Handicap). First Island's dam was descended from the broodmare Lavendula, foaled in 1930, whose other descendants included Ambiorix, My Babu, Bob's Return and Irish River.

As a yearling, First Island was consigned from the Corduff Stud to the Goffs sales in October where he was bought for IR£130,000 by John Ferguson Bloodstock. First Island then entered into the ownership of Moller Racing a racing organisation financed by a trust fund arranged in the will of Eric Moller, who died in 1988. The colt was sent to England to be trained by Geoff Wragg at his Abington Place stable in Newmarket. Like many of Wragg's horses, First Island usually competed in a sheepskin noseband.

== Racing career ==
=== 1994–1995: early career ===
First Island made his debut in a maiden race at Newmarket Racecourse on 26 August 1994. Ridden by Michael Hills who became his regular jockey, he finished unplaced behind the future St Leger Stakes winner Classic Cliche. The colt was then off the course for nine months before reappearing at Goodwood Racecourse in May 1995. Starting a 33/1 outsider for a maiden over one mile he recorded his first success by two and a half lengths from Iktamal, a colt who went on to win the Haydock Sprint Cup. Six days later, First Island completed a quick double when he won the Gresley Stakes at York by three lengths. The colt failed to win in his remaining five starts as a three-year-old, and although showing useful form he appeared to be some way below top class. His best efforts came when finishing third in the Group Three Jersey Stakes at Royal Ascot and when beaten a short head by Celestial Key when odds-on favourite for the Listed Marshall Stakes at Newmarket in October.

=== 1996: four-year-old season ===
==== Spring ====
In early 1996, First Island's most important role appeared to be that of lead-horse and training companion to the Wragg stable's outstanding middle-distance performer Pentire. On his seasonal debut, however, he showed that he made good progress as he won the Listed Doncaster Mile Stakes by one and a half lengths from Wijara. His next two runs saw him beaten when moved up in class as he finished third to Luso in the Earl of Sefton Stakes and fifth behind Gabr in the Sandown Mile. Having won only once in his last eight races, First Island next contested a one-mile Listed handicap race at York on 15 May. Ridden by Ray Cochrane, he took the lead approaching the final furlong and drew clear of the opposition to win by two and a half lengths under top weight of 133 pounds.

==== Summer ====
In June, the colt was sent to Royal Ascot for the ten furlong Prince of Wales's Stakes, then a Group Two race open to horses of three years of age and older, for which Michael Stoute's improving four-year-old Pilsudski was made favourite. Hills restrained First Island in the early stages before moving forward early in the straight. He took the lead a furlong from the finish and won his first Group race by a length from Montjoy. The winning time of 2:02.76 was a new track record. On 31 July, First Island moved up to Group One class for the first time when he contested the Sussex Stakes over one mile at Goodwood and was made 5/1 second favourite behind the Queen Anne Stakes winner Charnwood Forest. Hills appeared short of racing room in the final quarter mile but managed to drive the colt though a narrow gap before catching Charnwood Forest in the closing stages to win by a length, with the previous year's top-rated two-year-old Alhaarth in third. First Island moved back up in distance when he appeared at York again in August and finished second to Halling in the International Stakes over ten and a half furlongs.

==== Autumn ====
On 28 September, First Island took part in an exceptionally strong renewal of the Queen Elizabeth II Stakes: his six opponents were Ashkalani (Prix du Moulin), Bosra Sham, Mark of Esteem, Bijou d'Inde (St James's Palace Stakes), Charnwood Forest and Soviet Line (Lockinge Stakes). He was never able to challenge for the lead but finished third, beaten one and a half lengths and four lengths by Mark of Esteem and Bosra Sham. On his final European start of the year he made little impression in the Champion Stakes in October, finishing fifth of the six runners behind Bosra Sham and Halling. In December First Island was sent to Sha Tin Racecourse in Hong Kong for the ninth running of the Hong Kong Cup over 2000 metres. Although no European-trained horse had won the race, he started 9/5 favourite against eleven opponents, including runners from Hong Kong, Australia, New Zealand, Ireland, Japan and Singapore. First Island was not among the leaders, but made steady progress before challenging for the lead in the straight. He overtook the locally trained Benji 200 metres from the finish and won by three-quarters of a length from the Australian-trained six-year-old Seascay. On his retirement in 2008, Geoff Wragg remembered Teenoso as the best horse he had ever trained but said that First Island's victory in Hong Kong was "a very special day".

=== 1997: five-year-old season ===
First Island began his 1997 season in the Sandown Mile in April. On this occasion he was made the 5/6 favourite and finished second, beaten a head by Wixim, a four-year-old to whom he was conceding six pounds. Three weeks later at Newbury, First Island started second favourite behind the French challenger Spinning World in the Group One Lockinge Stakes. He took the lead approaching the final furlong and won by one and a half lengths from the subsequent Sussex Stakes winner Ali-Royal, with Spinning World a further five lengths back in fourth.

When preparing for Royal Ascot, First Island sustained a career-ending injury, described as a "spiral fracture to the right cannon bone" when training at Newmarket on 5 June. Following surgery intended to save him for a stud career, the horse contracted colic and was euthanised in mid-June.

A memorial plaque for First Island was placed in the middle of the lawn at Abington Place. Wragg called him "a lovely horse to train and tried his heart out... a horse we all loved".

== Pedigree ==
Pedigree of First Island (IRE), chestnut horse, 1992
Sire Dominion (GB) 1972	Derring-Do (GB); 1961	Darius	Dante
Sire Dominion (GB) 1972	Derring-Do (GB); 1961	Darius	Yasna
Sire Dominion (GB) 1972	Derring-Do (GB); 1961	Sipsey Bridge	Abernant
Sire Dominion (GB) 1972	Derring-Do (GB); 1961	Sipsey Bridge	Claudette
Sire Dominion (GB) 1972	Picture Palace (GB); 1961	Princely Gift	Nasrullah
Sire Dominion (GB) 1972	Picture Palace (GB); 1961	Princely Gift	Blue Gem
Sire Dominion (GB) 1972	Picture Palace (GB); 1961	Palais Glide	King Legend
Sire Dominion (GB) 1972	Picture Palace (GB); 1961	Palais Glide	Side Slip
Dam Caymana (FR) 1985	Bellypha (IRE); 1976	Lyphard	Northern Dancer
Dam Caymana (FR) 1985	Bellypha (IRE); 1976	Lyphard	Goofed
Dam Caymana (FR) 1985	Bellypha (IRE); 1976	Belga	Le Fabuleux
Dam Caymana (FR) 1985	Bellypha (IRE); 1976	Belga	Belle de Retz
Dam Caymana (FR) 1985	Antrona (GB); 1973	Royal Palace	Ballymoss
Dam Caymana (FR) 1985	Antrona (GB); 1973	Royal Palace	Crystal Palace
Dam Caymana (FR) 1985	Antrona (GB); 1973	Ileana	Abernant
Dam Caymana (FR) 1985	Antrona (GB); 1973	Ileana	Romantica (Family: 1-w)

- First Island was inbred 4 x 4 to Abernant, meaning that this stallion appears twice in the fourth generation of his pedigree.
