= Heron Stakes =

Flat horse race in Great Britain

- Class: Listed
- Location: Sandown Park; Esher, England
- Race type: Flat / Thoroughbred
- Sponsor: Chasemore Farm
- Website: Sandown Park

Race information
- Distance: 1m (1,609m)
- Surface: Turf
- Track: Right-handed
- Qualification: Three-year-olds
- Weight: 9 st 2 lb Allowances; 5 lb for fillies Penalties; 5 lb for Group winners* 3 lb for Listed winners* after 31 August 2020
- Purse: £45,000 (2024); 1st: £25,520

Heron Stakes
2026
Talk Of New York	Time To Turn	Andab

Previous years
2025
Opera Ballo	Bay City Roller	Jackknife
2024
Almaqam	Kikkuli	Sons And Lovers
2023
Captain Winters	Grey's Monument	Slipofthepen
2022
My Prospero	Reach For The Moon	Akhu Najla
2021
Mostahdaf	Highland Avenue	Bullace

2020-2011
2019
King Of Comedy	Roseman	Sangarius
2018
Without Parole	Gabr	Vintager
2017
Khafoo Shememi	Escobar	Zainhom
2016
Zonderland	Atlantic Sun	Forge
2015
Consort	Secret Brief	White Lake
2014
Master Carpenter	Indy	End of Line
2013
Montiridge	Mango Diva	Ebn Arab
2012
Cogito	Stipulate	Tales Of Grimm
2011
Tazahum	Fury	Neebras

2010-2001
2010
Fallen Idol	The Rectifier	Aldovrandi
2009
Border Patrol	Ashram	Spring Of Fame
2008
Redolent	Iguazu Falls	Virtual
2007
Massive	Charlie Farnsbarns	Jo'burg
2006
Final Verse	Deepwater Bay	Antica
2005
Proclamation	Tucker	Coeur Courageux
2004
Tahreeb	Leicester Square	Orcadian
2003
Kalaman	Ikhtyar	Rimrod
2002
Hero's Journey	Compton Dragon	Irony
2001
Dandoun	Aldebaran	Reef Diver

2000-1991
2000
Inglenook	Sir Ninja	Sun Charm
1999
Kalanisi	Industrialist	Peculiarity
1998
Speedfit Too	Golden Dice	Jinsiyah
1997
Among Men	Amid Albadu	Green Card
1996
Regal Archive	Sorbie Tower	Wixim
1995
Peace Envoy	Ihtiram	Royal Philosopher
1994
Bluegrass Prince	In Like Flynn	River Deep
1993
Mistle Cat	Port Lucaya	Ardkinglass
1992
Torrey Canyon	Pursuit Of Love	Casteddu
1991
Joie De Soir	Sapieha	Suomi

1990-1988
1990
Lord Florey	Palace Street	Kaheel
1989
Magical Strike	Hoy	Upper Strata
1988
Raykour	Western Gun	Nail Don

The Heron Stakes is a Listed flat horse race in Great Britain open to three-year-old thoroughbreds. It is run at Sandown Park over a distance of 1 mile (1,609 metres), and it is scheduled to take place each year in late May.

The event was formerly held at Kempton Park. It was staged at Goodwood in 2005 and 2006, and transferred to Sandown Park in 2007.

The Heron Stakes is usually part of a fixture called the Brigadier Gerard Evening which also features the Brigadier Gerard Stakes and the Henry II Stakes. The Heron Stakes was held at a separate meeting a week before Brigadier Gerard Evening in 2021.

== Records ==
Leading jockey (5 wins):

- Frankie Dettori – Lord Florey (1990), Proclamation (2005), Cogito (2012), Without Parole (2018), King of Comedy (2019)

Leading trainer (10 wins):

- Sir Michael Stoute – Dalsaan (1980), Spark of Life (1981), Diaglyphard (1985), Neshad (1987), Magical Strike (1989), Among Men (1997), Kalaman (2003), Final Verse (2006), Tazahum (2011), Consort (2015)

== Winners ==
Year	Winner	Jockey	Trainer	Time
1978	Persian Bold	Kipper Lynch	Tony Ingham	1:24.43
1979	Kris	Joe Mercer	Henry Cecil	1:28.41
1980	Dalsaan	Lester Piggott	Michael Stoute	1:25.80
1981	Spark of Life	Walter Swinburn	Michael Stoute	1:31.10
1982	Come On The Blues	Willie Carson	Clive Brittain	1:27.01
1983	The Noble Player	Steve Cauthen	Barry Hills	1:31.18
1984	Superlative	Tony Ives	Bill O'Gorman	1:25.72
1985	Diaglyphard	Walter Swinburn	Michael Stoute	1:35.93
1986	Faustus	Steve Cauthen	Henry Cecil	1:39.82
1987	Neshad	Walter Swinburn	Michael Stoute	1:38.82
1988	Raykour	Ray Cochrane	Luca Cumani	1:38.99
1989	Magical Strike	Greville Starkey	Michael Stoute	1:36.74
1990	Lord Florey	Frankie Dettori	Luca Cumani	1:42.09
1991	Joie de Soir	Paul Eddery	Fulke Johnson Houghton	1:42.93
1992	Torrey Canyon	Ray Cochrane	Roger Charlton	1:38.37
1993	Mistle Cat	Wendyll Woods	Sean Woods	1:38.30
1994	Bluegrass Prince	Brent Thomson	Richard Hannon Sr.	1:46.56
1995	Peace Envoy	Pat Eddery	Henry Cecil	1:38.25
1996	Regal Archive	John Reid	Peter Chapple-Hyam	1:41.89
1997	Among Men	Ray Cochrane	Michael Stoute	1:37.95
1998	Speedfit Too	Gary Carter	George Margarson	1:40.47
1999	Kalanisi	Gérald Mossé	Luca Cumani	1:35.64
2000	Inglenook	Pat Eddery	John Dunlop	1:46.69
2001	Dandoun	Kieren Fallon	John Dunlop	1:38.03
2002	Hero's Journey	Darryll Holland	Richard Hannon Sr.	1:36.98
2003	Kalaman (Note: The 2003 winner Kalaman was later exported to Hong Kong and renamed Oriental Magic)	Christophe Soumillon	Sir Michael Stoute	1:38.44
2004	Tahreeb	Martin Dwyer	Marcus Tregoning	1:37.76
2005	Proclamation	Frankie Dettori	Jeremy Noseda	1:39.31
2006	Final Verse	Robert Winston	Sir Michael Stoute	1:45.28
2007	Massive	Darryll Holland	Mick Channon	1:46.70
2008	Redolent	Ryan Moore	Richard Hannon Sr.	1:46.93
2009	Border Patrol	Steve Drowne	Roger Charlton	1:42.63
2010	Fallen Idol	William Buick	John Gosden	1:42.60
2011	Tazahum	Richard Hills	Sir Michael Stoute	1:47.45
2012	Cogito	Frankie Dettori	Brian Meehan	1:42.71
2013	Montiridge	Richard Hughes	Richard Hannon Sr.	1:44.84
2014	Master Carpenter	Ryan Moore	Rod Millman	1:49.24
2015	Consort	Ryan Moore	Sir Michael Stoute	1:40.89
2016	Zonderland	Adam Kirby	Clive Cox	1:42.53
2017	Khafoo Shememi	Ryan Moore	Richard Hannon Jr.	1:42.61
2018	Without Parole	Frankie Dettori	John Gosden	1:45.54
2019	King of Comedy	Frankie Dettori	John Gosden	1:40.29
	no race 2020 (Note: The 2020 running was cancelled because of the COVID-19 pandemic in the United Kingdom)
2021	Mostahdaf	Jim Crowley	John and Thady Gosden	1:50.29
2022	My Prospero	Tom Marquand	William Haggas	1:41.94
2023	Captain Winters	Neil Callan	Kevin Ryan	1:44.92
2024	Almaqam	William Buick	Ed Walker	1:46.07
2025	Opera Ballo	William Buick	Charlie Appleby	1:42.45
2026	Talk of New York	William Buick	Charlie Appleby	1:40.37

== See also ==
- Horse racing in Great Britain
- List of British flat horse races
