= Jet Ski Lady =

American-bred Thoroughbred racehorse

- Racing silks of Maktoum Al Maktoum
- Sire: Vaguely Noble
- Grandsire: Vienna
- Dam: Bemissed
- Damsire: Nijinsky
- Sex: Mare
- Foaled: 20 February 1988
- Country: United States
- Colour: Chestnut
- Breeder: Ryehill Farm
- Owner: Maktoum Al Maktoum
- Trainer: Jim Bolger
- Record: 10: 4-2-1
- Earnings: £231,058

Major wins
- Ballysax Stakes (1991); Epsom Oaks (1991)

Honours
- Timeform rating: 122

Jet Ski Lady (foaled 20 February 1988) was an American-bred, Irish-trained thoroughbred racehorse, best known for winning The Oaks in 1991. In a racing career which lasted from June 1990 to October 1991 the filly ran ten times and won four races. After winning twice as a two-year-old, Jet Ski Lady competed against colts with mixed success in early 1991 before winning the Classic Oaks over one and a half miles at Epsom Downs Racecourse. Her winning margin of ten lengths was the second-widest in the race's history and her starting price of 50/1 made her the equal longest-priced winner of the Oaks on record. She subsequently finished second in both the Irish Oaks at the Curragh and the Yorkshire Oaks at York. She was retired to stud after finishing unplaced in the Prix de l'Arc de Triomphe.

== Background ==
Jet Ski Lady was a chestnut mare with a white star and two white socks bred in Maryland by the Ryehill Farm stud. Her sire, Vaguely Noble, who was twenty-three years old when she was foaled, won the Prix de l'Arc de Triomphe in 1968 before becoming a successful breeding stallion. His best progeny included Dahlia, Exceller and Empery. Jet Ski Lady's dam, Bemissed, was a successful racemare in the United States, winning the Selima Stakes in 1982. As a descendant of the broodmare Feola, Jet Ski Lady came from the same branch of thoroughbred family 2-f which produced Round Table, Pebbles and Aureole.

Jet Ski Lady was acquired by Maktoum Al Maktoum and sent to race in Europe. She was trained in County Kilkenny by Jim Bolger and was ridden in all but one of her races by Christy Roche.

== Racing career ==
=== 1990: two-year-old season ===
Jet Ski Lady began her career in a six-furlong maiden race at Leopardstown in June. She started odds-on favourite and won by three lengths from Tenderene. Nine days later, she was moved up in class to contest a Listed race over the same course and distance, but despite starting at odds of 1/2 she finished third of the six runners behind Seneca Reef. In August, Jet Ski Lady stepped up to seven furlongs for a nursery handicap and carried top weight of 131 pounds to a three-quarter-length victory. On her final start of the season the filly was moved up into Group One class as she was sent to France to contest the Prix Marcel Boussac at Longchamp Racecourse. She led the field into the straight but was outpaced in the closing stages and finished seventh of the nine runners behind the unbeaten British filly Shadayid.

=== 1991: three-year-old season ===
Rather than being aimed at the usual trial races for fillies, Jet Ski Lady began her three-year-old season by running against a field of colts in the ten-furlong Ballysax Stakes at the Curragh in April. She started at odds of 4/1 and won by 1 1/2 lengths and a neck from the Vincent O'Brien-trained runners Classic Minstrel and Legal Profession. Two weeks later, the filly was again matched against male opponents in the Derrinstown Stud Derby Trial and finished fourth behind Runyon, George Augustus and Smooth Performance.

In the Oaks at Epsom on 8 June, Jet Ski Lady was the complete outsider of the nine runners, starting at odds of 50/1. Shadayid, who had won the 1000 Guineas was made the even-money favourite ahead of the Fillies' Mile winner Shamshir: no other runner apart from Jet Ski Lady started at longer than 20/1. Christy Roche sent the Irish filly into the lead soon after the start and she turned into the straight with a clear lead over Dartrey and Shadayid. The favourite attempted to challenge the leader, but Jet Ski Lady drew steadily further away from her rivals in the last quarter-mile and won easily by ten lengths. Shamshir stayed on to take second place from Shadayid in the closing stages. The winning margin of ten lengths equaled that of Noblesse in 1963 and had been bettered only by Sun Princess's twelve-length win in 1983. The winner's price of 50/1 was the biggest in the race since Vespa succeeded at the same odds in 1833.

A month after her win at Epsom, Jet Ski Lady was made the 7/4 favourite for the Irish Oaks at the Curragh. Roche sent the filly to the front just after half way and she maintained her lead into the straight. In the final furlong she was challenged by the British-trained Possessive Dancer, and despite running on well under pressure she was overtaken and beaten half a length. Jet Ski Lady and Possessive Dancer met again in the Yorkshire Oaks, which also attracted Shamshir and the Ribblesdale Stakes winner Third Watch. Jet Ski Lady took the lead in the straight and went clear of the field but was caught in the last stride and beaten a short head by the outsider Magnificent Star. On her final appearance Jet Ski Lady started a 40/1 outsider for the Prix de l'Arc de Triomphe at Longchamp in October. She was never in contention and finished thirteenth of the fourteen runners behind Suave Dancer.

== Assessment and honours ==
The independent Timeform organisation gave Jet Ski Lady a rating of 122.

In their book, A Century of Champions, based on the Timeform rating system, John Randall and Tony Morris rated Jet Ski Lady an "inferior" winner of the Oaks.

== Stud record ==
Jet Ski Lady was retired to become a broodmare for Maktoum Al Maktoum's Gainsborough Stud. She was bred to several leading stallions including Sadler's Wells, Rainbow Quest and Green Desert, but made very little impact, with none of her foals succeeding at Group race level. She produced two minor winners, namely Legaya (by Shirley Heights) and Lucky Lady (by Nashwan).

- 1993 ANSWERED PRAYER (GB) : Bay filly, foaled 26 March, by Green Desert (USA) – unraced, dam of winners
- 1994 LEGAYA (GB) : Bay filly, foaled 1 January, by Shirley Heights (GB) – won 1 race and placed 4 times from 8 starts in Ireland 1997
- 1997 LUCKY LADY (GB) : Chesnut filly, foaled 11 February, by Nashwan (USA) – won 1 race and placed 2nd twice from 3 starts in Britain 2000
- 2007 COLORADO SKI (SAF) : Chesnut colt (gelded), by Western Winter (USA) – minor winner in South Africa

== Pedigree ==
Pedigree of Jet Ski Lady (USA), chestnut mare, 1988
Sire Vaguely Noble	Vienna	Aureole	Hyperion
Sire Vaguely Noble	Vienna	Aureole	Angelola
Sire Vaguely Noble	Vienna	Turkish Blood	Turkhan
Sire Vaguely Noble	Vienna	Turkish Blood	Rusk
Sire Vaguely Noble	Noble Lassie	Nearco	Pharos
Sire Vaguely Noble	Noble Lassie	Nearco	Nogara
Sire Vaguely Noble	Noble Lassie	Belle Sauvage	Big Game
Sire Vaguely Noble	Noble Lassie	Belle Sauvage	Tropical Sun
Dam Bemissed	Nijinsky	Northern Dancer	Nearctic
Dam Bemissed	Nijinsky	Northern Dancer	Natalma
Dam Bemissed	Nijinsky	Flaming Page	Bull Page
Dam Bemissed	Nijinsky	Flaming Page	Flaring Top
Dam Bemissed	Bemis Heights	Herbager	Vandale
Dam Bemissed	Bemis Heights	Herbager	Flagette
Dam Bemissed	Bemis Heights	Orissa	First Landing
Dam Bemissed	Bemis Heights	Orissa	Salt Lake (Family: 2-f)
