= Unite (horse) =

Irish-bred Thoroughbred racehorse

- Racing silks of Sheikh Mohammed
- Sire: Kris
- Grandsire: Sharpen Up
- Dam: Pro Patria
- Damsire: Petingo
- Sex: Mare
- Foaled: 3 April 1984
- Country: Ireland
- Colour: Chestnut
- Breeder: E. J. Loder
- Owner: Sheikh Mohammed
- Trainer: Michael Stoute
- Record: 5:3-1-0

Major wins
- Oaks Stakes (1987); Irish Oaks (1987)

Awards
- Top-rated European three-year-old filly, 11 furlongs plus (1987); Timeform rating: 83p in 1986, 126 in 1987

Unite (3 April 1984 – July 1995) was an Irish-bred, British-trained Thoroughbred racehorse and broodmare best known for winning The Oaks in 1987. She finished second in her only race as a two-year-old and won a minor race in the spring of 1987 before winning the Oaks. She followed up with an easy win in the Irish Oaks but was retired from racing after running poorly in the King George VI and Queen Elizabeth Stakes. She had some success as a broodmare.

== Background ==
Unite was a "rangy, rather angular" chestnut mare with white socks on her hind feet bred by Edmund Loder at the family's Eyresfield Stud near the Curragh in County Kildare. She was the second of two classic winners, following the Triple Crown winner Oh So Sharp, sired by Kris the leading British miler of 1979. Unite's dam Pro Patria was a granddaughter of My Game, whose other descendants included Marling, Marwell and the Ascot Gold Cup winner Paean.

As a yearling, Unite was sent to the Highflyer Yearling Sale at Newmarket and bought for 310,000 guineas by Sheikh Mohammed. The filly was sent into training with Michael Stoute at Newmarket, and was ridden to her biggest successes by Walter Swinburn.

== Racing career ==
As a two-year-old in 1986, Unite bypassed maiden races and made her debut in the Blue Seal Stakes over six furlongs at Ascot Racecourse in September. She started odds-on favourite, but after taking the lead at half way she showed inexperience ("running green") and finished second, three lengths behind the winner White Mischief.

Unite made her three-year-old debut at Newmarket Racecourse in April when she contested a one-mile Graduation Stakes (a race for horses which had won no more than one race). She won the race by one and a half lengths from the Henry Cecil-trained In The Habit.

Unite was then moved up sharply to contest the 208th running of the Oaks Stakes (named for sponsorship reasons the Gold Seal Oaks) over one and a half miles at Epsom Downs Racecourse on 6 June. Stoute had originally intended to run the filly in the Irish 1,000 Guineas, but after her win at Newmarket he decided that she needed further than a mile to show her full potential. Unite started at odds of 11/1 against ten opponents, with Scimitarra, the winner of the Lupe Stakes being made the 5/2 favourite ahead of Three Tails on 3/1. The first two in the betting were both owned by Sheikh Mohammed and Unite carried her owner's third colours, with a distinguishing blue cap. Swinburn positioned the filly just behind the leaders before taking the lead from Scimitarra entering the final furlong. In the closing stages the filly drew clear of her opponents to win by five lengths from Bourbon Girl, who was in turn three lengths ahead of Three Tails. Scimitarra broke down injured and was pulled up by her jockey Steve Cauthen. Five weeks after her Epsom win Unite started 8/13 favourite for the Irish Oaks at the Curragh. She was never seriously challenged and won easily by three lengths from Bourbon Girl with the subsequent Irish St. Leger winner Eurobird four lengths further back in third.

On 25 July Unite contested Britain's most prestigious all-aged race, the King George VI and Queen Elizabeth Stakes over one and a half miles at Ascot and started at odds of 13/2 in a field which included Reference Point, Triptych, Moon Madness, Tony Bin and Acatenango. She appeared to be going well until the final turn, but then dropped back rapidly to finish eighth of the nine runners, more than twenty lengths behind the winner Reference Point. It was subsequently revealed than the filly had suffered a broken blood vessel during the race.

== Assessment ==
In 1986, the Independent Timeform organisation gave Unite a rating of 83p, the "p" indicating that she was likely to improve. In the following year he was given a Timeform rating of 126, six pounds below the top-rated three-year-old filly Indian Skimmer. In the official International Classification she was rated the fourth-best European three-year-old filly (behind Miesque, Indian Skimmer and Milligram) and the best in the 11 furlongs plus division with a rating of 125. In their book, A Century of Champions, based on the Timeform rating system, John Randall and Tony Morris rated Unite an "average" winner of the Oaks.

== Stud record ==
Unite was retired from racing after her defeat in the King George and became a broodmare for her owner's Darley Stud. Unite died in July 1995. She produced two winning daughters:

- United Kingdom, bay filly 1989, sired by Danzig, won one race
- La Confederation, bay filly 1991, sired by Nureyev, won three races including the Sun Chariot Stakes. Granddam of the Jockey Club Cup winner Veracity.

== Pedigree ==
Pedigree of Unite (IRE), chestnut mare, 1984
Sire Kris (GB) 1976	Sharpen Up (GB); 1969	Atan	Native Dancer
Sire Kris (GB) 1976	Sharpen Up (GB); 1969	Atan	Mixed Marriage
Sire Kris (GB) 1976	Sharpen Up (GB); 1969	Rocchetta	Rockfella
Sire Kris (GB) 1976	Sharpen Up (GB); 1969	Rocchetta	Chambiges
Sire Kris (GB) 1976	Doubly Sure (GB); 1971	Reliance	Tantieme
Sire Kris (GB) 1976	Doubly Sure (GB); 1971	Reliance	Relance
Sire Kris (GB) 1976	Doubly Sure (GB); 1971	Soft Angels	Crepello
Sire Kris (GB) 1976	Doubly Sure (GB); 1971	Soft Angels	Sweet Angel
Dam Pro Patria (IRE) 1976	Petingo (GB); 1965	Petition	Fair Trial
Dam Pro Patria (IRE) 1976	Petingo (GB); 1965	Petition	Art Paper
Dam Pro Patria (IRE) 1976	Petingo (GB); 1965	Alcazar	Alycidon
Dam Pro Patria (IRE) 1976	Petingo (GB); 1965	Alcazar	Quarterdeck
Dam Pro Patria (IRE) 1976	Joyful (GB); 1962	Princely Gift	Nasrullah
Dam Pro Patria (IRE) 1976	Joyful (GB); 1962	Princely Gift	Blue Gem
Dam Pro Patria (IRE) 1976	Joyful (GB); 1962	My Game	My Babu
Dam Pro Patria (IRE) 1976	Joyful (GB); 1962	My Game	Flirting (Family: 14-c)
