= Marling (horse) =

Irish-bred Thoroughbred racehorse

- Sire: Lomond
- Grandsire: Northern Dancer
- Dam: Marwell
- Damsire: Habitat
- Sex: Mare
- Foaled: 17 March 1989
- Country: Ireland
- Colour: Bay
- Breeder: Edmund Loder
- Owner: Edmund Loder
- Trainer: Geoff Wragg
- Record: 10:7-1-0
- Earnings: £478,072

Major wins
- National Stakes (1991); Queen Mary Stakes (1991); Cheveley Park Stakes (1991); Irish 1000 Guineas (1992); Coronation Stakes (1992); Sussex Stakes (1992)

Marling (foaled 17 March 1989) was an Irish-bred, British-trained Thoroughbred racehorse and broodmare. She was one of the leading European two-year-olds of 1991 when she was unbeaten in four races including the Queen Mary Stakes and Cheveley Park Stakes. In the following year she was narrowly beaten in the 1000 Guineas but went on to win the Irish 1000 Guineas, Coronation Stakes and Sussex Stakes. She was retired to stud at the end of 1992 and has had some success as a dam of winners.

== Background ==
Marling was a small, dark-coated bay filly with no white markings bred by her owner, Edmund Loder at the family's Eyrefield Stud near the Curragh in County Kildare. She was probably the best racehorse sired by Lomond, an American-bred half-brother of Seattle Slew who won the 2000 Guineas in 1983 when trained in Ireland by Vincent O'Brien. Marling's dam Marwell was outstanding sprinter whose wins included the Cheveley Park Stakes, King's Stand Stakes, July Cup and Prix de l'Abbaye. Marwell's other progeny included Caerwent, a colt who won the Irish National Stakes in 1987. As a granddaughter of the broodmare My Game, Marwell was also closely related to the Ascot Gold Cup winner Paean and the Oaks winner Unite.

Loder sent his filly into training with Geoff Wragg at his Abington House stables on Bury Road in Newmarket. Like many horses trained by Wragg, Marling usually raced in a white sheepskin noseband.

== Racing career ==
=== 1991: two-year-old season ===
Marling was undefeated in four races as a two-year-old in 1991. On her debut she ran in a maiden race over five furlongs at Newmarket Racecourse on 3 May when she was ridden by Gary Carter. Starting the 5/4 favourite, she won the race comfortably by one and a half lengths from Twafeaj, a filly who went on to the Moyglare Stud Stakes. Later that month she won the Charles Heidsieck National Stakes at Sandown, beating Miss Bluebird by a neck.

In June, Marling started 11/4 favourite for the Group Three Queen Mary Stakes at Royal Ascot. She took the lead inside the final furlong and won by a length from Culture Vulture.

After a break over three months, Marling returned to racecourse action in the Group One Cheveley Park Stakes over six furlongs at Newmarket on 2 October. Ridden by Walter Swinburn she started the 15/8 favourite and won by one and a half lengths from the French-trained filly Absurde.

=== 1992: three-year-old season ===
On her three-year-old debut, Marling was one of fourteen fillies to contest the 179th running of the 1000 Guineas over Newmarket's Rowley Mile course on 30 April. Ridden by Steve Cauthen, Marling was held up in the early stages and struggled to obtain a clear run in the last quarter mile. In the closing stages, Marling finished strongly, but failed by a head to catch the French-trained filly Hatoof. A month later, Marling was sent to Ireland for the Irish 1000 Guineas at the Curragh. Ridden by Swinburn, and starting the 4/5 favourite, she accelerated into the lead inside the final furlong and won by a length from Market Booster.

On 17 June, Marling met Culture Vulture for the second time in the Coronation Stakes at Royal Ascot. Since their first meeting Culture Vulture had won the Lowther Stakes, the Fillies' Mile and the Poule d'Essai des Pouliches. Marling turned into the straight sixth of the seven runners but moved up to take the lead approaching the final furlong. In the closing stages she held off the challenge of Culture Vulture to win by three quarters of a length. After the race Wragg called the winner "easily the best filly I've trained". In the Sussex Stakes at Goodwood Racecourse in July, Marling was tested against colts and older horses including Sheikh Albadou, Selkirk, Star of Cozzene, Second Set (winner of the race in 1991) and the multiple Group One winner Sikeston. Ridden by the Irish veteran Pat Eddery, Marling moved up to challenge for the lead in the straight and got the better of a sustained struggle with Selkirk to win by a head.

Marling had two more races, but failed to reproduce her earlier form. In September she finished seventh of the nine runners behind Lahib in the Queen Elizabeth II Stakes at Ascot after weakening in the closing stages. On 31 October, Marling was sent to the United States for the Breeders' Cup Distaff over nine furlongs at Belmont Park. The plane carrying Marling to America encountered severe turbulence, leaving the filly frightened and unwilling to feed: Wragg said that the incident "didn't do her any good". Racing on dirt for the first time, over a distance she had never previously attempted, she finished fifth of the fourteen runners behind Paseana.

== Assessment ==
Despite beating Culture Vulture on the only occasion on which they met in 1989, Marling lost to the Paul Cole-trained filly for the title of European Champion Two-Year-Old Filly.

== Stud record ==
Marling was retired to become a broodmare, and has been moderately successful. Although she has had no top-class runners, she has produced at least three winners:

- Half-Hitch, foaled 1995, bay filly sired by Diesis, won one race
- Pilgrim's Way, 1996, brown filly by Gone West, won two races
- Mugharreb, 1998, bay colt by Gone West, won three races, second in the Duke of York Stakes

== Pedigree ==
Pedigree of Marling (IRE), bay mare, 1989
Sire Lomond (USA) 1980	Northern Dancer (CAN); 1961	Nearctic	Nearco
Sire Lomond (USA) 1980	Northern Dancer (CAN); 1961	Nearctic	Lady Angela
Sire Lomond (USA) 1980	Northern Dancer (CAN); 1961	Natalma	Native Dancer
Sire Lomond (USA) 1980	Northern Dancer (CAN); 1961	Natalma	Almahmoud
Sire Lomond (USA) 1980	My Charmer (USA); 1969	Poker	Round Table
Sire Lomond (USA) 1980	My Charmer (USA); 1969	Poker	Glamour
Sire Lomond (USA) 1980	My Charmer (USA); 1969	Fair Charmer	Jet Action
Sire Lomond (USA) 1980	My Charmer (USA); 1969	Fair Charmer	Myrtle Charm
Dam Marwell (IRE) 1978	Habitat (USA); 1966	Sir Gaylord	Turn-To
Dam Marwell (IRE) 1978	Habitat (USA); 1966	Sir Gaylord	Somethingroyal
Dam Marwell (IRE) 1978	Habitat (USA); 1966	Little Hut	Occupy
Dam Marwell (IRE) 1978	Habitat (USA); 1966	Little Hut	Savage Beauty
Dam Marwell (IRE) 1978	Lady Seymour (GB); 1972	Tudor Melody	Tudor Minstrel
Dam Marwell (IRE) 1978	Lady Seymour (GB); 1972	Tudor Melody	Matelda
Dam Marwell (IRE) 1978	Lady Seymour (GB); 1972	My Game	My Babu
Dam Marwell (IRE) 1978	Lady Seymour (GB); 1972	My Game	Flirting (Family:14-c)
