= Shadayid =

American-bred Thoroughbred racehorse

- Sire: Shadeed
- Grandsire: Nijinsky
- Dam: Desirable
- Damsire: Lord Gayle
- Sex: Mare
- Foaled: 10 April 1988
- Country: United States
- Colour: Grey
- Breeder: Shadwell Stud
- Owner: Hamdan Al Maktoum
- Trainer: John Dunlop
- Record: 11: 5-2-3
- Earnings: £401,762

Major wins
- Prix Marcel Boussac (1990); Fred Darling Stakes (1991); 1000 Guineas (1991)

Shadayid (10 April 1988 – April 2002) was an American-bred, British-trained Thoroughbred racehorse and broodmare. In a racing career which lasted from June 1990 to November 1991 she ran eleven times winning five races and being placed five times. Shadayid was one of the leading two-year-old fillies in Europe in 1990, winning all three of her races including the Group One Prix Marcel Boussac at the Longchamp. After winning the Fred Darling Stakes on her three-year-old debut, Shadayid took her unbeaten run to five by winning the Classic 1000 Guineas at Newmarket. Although she never won again, she finished second in the Coronation Stakes and the Sussex Stakes and third in the Haydock Sprint Cup and the Queen Elizabeth II Stakes. Shadayid was retired from racing to become a broodmare at the end of her three-year-old season after finishing seventh in the Breeders' Cup Mile.

== Background ==
Shadayid was a grey filly bred in Kentucky by her owner Hamdan Al Maktoum's Shadwell Stud. Shadayid was one of the best horses sired by Shadeed who won the 2000 Guineas and the Queen Elizabeth II Stakes in 1985. Shadayid inherited her grey coat from her dam, the Cheveley Park Stakes winner Desirable and was a half sister of Dumaani, the double winner of the Keeneland Breeders Cup Stakes. As a granddaughter of the broodmare Balidaress, Shadayid was closely related to many successful Thoroughbreds including the 1000 Guineas winner Russian Rhythm and Cape Cross, the sire of Sea the Stars.

The filly was trained throughout her career by John Dunlop at Arundel, West Sussex. She was ridden in all but one of her races by Willie Carson.

== Racing career ==
=== 1992: two-year-old season ===
Shadayid began her racing career in a six furlong maiden race at Ascot Racecourse in June. She started 13/8 favourite and won by six lengths. After a break of three months, Shadayid returned to Ascot for the Kensington Palace Stakes over seven furlongs. She started odds-on favourite and recorded a three and a half length win without being asked for a serious effort ("hard held"). Nine days after her second Ascot win, Shadayid was stepped up in class for the Group One Prix Marcel Boussac at Longchamp. Carson sent the grey filly into the lead in the straight and she quickly went clear of her opponents to win by two lengths from the future Prix de Diane winner Caerlina. The unplaced horses included Magic Night and Jet Ski Lady who went on to win the Prix Vermeille and The Oaks respectively.

=== 1993: three-year-old season ===
On her first appearance as a three-year-old, Shadayid was sent to Newbury for the Fred Darling Stakes, a trial race for the 1000 Guineas. Her opponents included the Lowther Stakes winner Only Yours and the Cherry Hinton Stakes winner Chicarica. Shadayid started 8/11 favourite and won comfortably by three lengths. Two weeks later, Shadayid started 4/6 favourite for the 1000 Guineas over Newmarket's Rowley Mile course. Her closest rival in the betting was the Luca Cumani-trained Crystal Gazing, a filly who had won the Rockfel Stakes and the Nell Gwyn Stakes. Carson restrained the filly in the early stages before moving forward in the second half of the race. Shadayid took the lead inside the final furlong and went clear to win by two lengths from the Irish-trained Kooyonga, with Crystal Gazing third.

A month after her Newmarket victory, Shadayid was moved up in distance to contest her second Classic, the Oaks, over one and a half miles at Epsom Downs Racecourse. The race produced an upset result, with Jet Ski Lady, a 50/1 outsider, leading for most of the race and winning by ten lengths, with Shadayid tiring in the closing stages to lose her unbeaten record as she finished third. Eleven days after the Oaks, Shadayid returned to a mile for the Coronation Stakes] at Royal Ascot where she was matched against Kooyonga, who had won the Irish 1,000 Guineas since her defeat at Newmarket, and the Poule d'Essai des Pouliches winner Danseuse du Soir. Shadayid was in third place entering the straight and appeared to have every chance but was beaten three quarters of a length into second by Kooyonga. In July, Shadayid ran against colts and older horses in the Sussex Stakes at Goodwood Racecourse. She started 9/4 favourite and finished second of the eight runners behind Second Set.

In September, the filly was brought back in distance for the Sprint Cup over six furlongs at Haydock Park. Racing against specialist sprinters she finished third behind Polar Falcon and Sheikh Albadou. On her final European start, Shadayid led until the final furlong before finishing third to Selkirk and Kooyonga in the Queen Elizabeth II Stakes at Ascot, with Second Set fourth and Hector Protector in sixth. Shadayid's final appearance came in November when she was sent to the United States to contest the Breeders' Cup Mile at Churchill Downs. She started a 22/1 outsider and finished seventh of the fourteen runners behind Opening Verse.

== Assessment and honours ==
In their book, A Century of Champions, based on the Timeform rating system, John Randall and Tony Morris rated Shadayid an "average" winner of the 1000 Guineas.

The main yearling farm at Shadwell Stud's Lexington headquarters is named in honour of Shadayid.

John Dunlop said of Shadayid: "She was a remarkably versatile filly. She won the 1,000 Guineas, was placed in the Oaks and was then placed in the Haydock Sprint, which was quite extraordinary. She was top-class", while Willie Carson called her "a very, very good filly".

== Stud record ==
Shadayid retired from racing to become a broodmare for Shadwell Stud. She produced several winners including Bint Shadayid (sired by Nashwan) who won the Prestige Stakes and finished third in the 1995 1000 Guineas and Imtiyaz (by Woodman), a colt who won at Listed level and finished second in the Group One Prix Jean Prat, before retiring to stud in India. Shadayid died after rupturing a uterine artery giving birth to a healthy foal in April 2002.

1993 Bint Shadayid (USA) : Grey filly, foaled 5 April, by Nashwan (USA) - won 2 races including G3 Prestige Stakes, Goodwood; 2nd G1 Fillies' Mile, Ascot; 3rd G1 1000 Guineas Stakes, Newmarket from 7 starts in England, Ireland and France 1995–96

1994 Shawaf (USA) : Bay colt, foaled 28 May, by Mr Prospector (USA) - won 1 race and placed third twice from 4 starts in England 1996–97

1997 Ashjaan (USA) : Grey filly, foaled 10 February, by Silver Hawk (USA) - won once and placed 4 times from 6 starts in England 1999

1998 Alshadiyah (USA) : Grey filly, foaled 26 February, by Danzig (USA) - won 2 races including LR Firth of Clyde Stakes, Ayr; 2nd LR Sceptre Stakes, Doncaster; 3rd G3 Fred Darling Stakes, Newbury from 9 starts in England and Scotland 2000–01

1999 Imtiyaz (USA) : Grey colt, foaled 14 March, by Woodman (USA) - won 4 races including LR Glasgow Stakes, York; LR Foundation Stakes, Goodwood; 2nd G1 Prix Jean Prat, Chantilly; 2nd LR Foundation Stakes, Goodwood; 2nd LR On The House Stakes, Goodwood; 3rd LR Superlative Stakes, Newmarket; 3rd LR Steventon Stakes, Newbury from 15 starts in England, France and Dubai 2001–04

2000 Murashah (USA) : Chesnut colt, foaled 3 April, by Storm Cat (USA) - won once from 2 starts in England 2003–04

2001 Muhaymin (USA) : Chesnut colt, foaled 17 April, by A.P. Indy (USA) - won once from 7 starts in England 2003–04

2002 Teeba (USA) : Chesnut filly, foaled 27 April, by Seeking The Gold (USA) - won 1 race; 2nd LR Valiant Stakes, Newbury; 3rd LR Atalanta Stakes, Sandown from 4 starts in England 2004–05

== Pedigree ==
Pedigree of Shadayid (USA), grey mare, 1988
Sire Shadeed (USA) 1982	Nijisnsky; 1967	Northern Dancer	Nearctic
Sire Shadeed (USA) 1982	Nijisnsky; 1967	Northern Dancer	Natalma
Sire Shadeed (USA) 1982	Nijisnsky; 1967	Flaming Page	Bull Page
Sire Shadeed (USA) 1982	Nijisnsky; 1967	Flaming Page	Flaring Top
Sire Shadeed (USA) 1982	Continual; 1976	Damascus	Sword Dancer
Sire Shadeed (USA) 1982	Continual; 1976	Damascus	Kerala
Sire Shadeed (USA) 1982	Continual; 1976	Continuation	Forli
Sire Shadeed (USA) 1982	Continual; 1976	Continuation	Comtinue
Dam Desirable (GB) 1981	Lord Gayle; 1965	Sir Gaylord	Turn-To
Dam Desirable (GB) 1981	Lord Gayle; 1965	Sir Gaylord	Somethingroyal
Dam Desirable (GB) 1981	Lord Gayle; 1965	Sticky Case	Court Martial
Dam Desirable (GB) 1981	Lord Gayle; 1965	Sticky Case	Run Honey
Dam Desirable (GB) 1981	Balidaress; 1973	Balidar	Will Somers
Dam Desirable (GB) 1981	Balidaress; 1973	Balidar	Violet Bank
Dam Desirable (GB) 1981	Balidaress; 1973	Innocence	Sea Hawk
Dam Desirable (GB) 1981	Balidaress; 1973	Innocence	Novitiate (Family: 14-c)
