= Suave Dancer =

American-bred Thoroughbred racehorse

- Racing silks of Henri Chalhoub
- Sire: Green Dancer
- Grandsire: Nijinsky
- Dam: Suavite
- Damsire: Alleged
- Sex: Stallion
- Foaled: 1988
- Country: USA
- Colour: Bay
- Breeder: Xalapa Farm
- Owner: Henri Chalhoub
- Trainer: John E. Hammond
- Record: 9: 5-2-2
- Earnings: $1,741,772

Major wins
- Prix Greffulhe (1991); Prix du Jockey Club (1991); Irish Champion Stakes (1991); Prix de l'Arc de Triomphe (1991)

Awards
- European Champion 3-Yr-Old Colt (1991)

Honours
- Life-sized statue at Longchamp Racecourse
- Last updated on September 23, 2006

Suave Dancer (1988–1998) was a French Thoroughbred race horse.

== Background ==
Bred by Lillie F. Webb's Xalapa Farm near Paris, Kentucky, Suave Dancer was sired by Green Dancer out of the mare Suavite, both American thoroughbreds. A male line descendant of Northern Dancer through Nijinsky II, and a female line descendant of Ribot via Tom Rolfe, Suave Dancer was owned by French businessman Henri Chalhoub and trained by Chantilly, France-based Englishman, John E. Hammond.

== Racing career ==
Ridden by American jockey Cash Asmussen, who actually selected and purchased the horse for the owner, Suave Dancer won the 1991 Prix du Jockey Club, Prix de l'Arc de Triomphe, was second to Generous in the Irish Derby then came back to win the Irish Champion Stakes. For his performance in 1991, Suave Dancer was voted the Cartier Three-Year-Old European Champion Colt.

== Stud record ==
In 1991 The National Stud at Newmarket bought a half-share in Suave Dancer. Retired to stud, he was later sent to Eliza Park Stud in Romsey, Victoria, Australia. Suave Dancer was the sire of 11 stakes winners including Compton Admiral and Volvoreta (Prix Vermeille) before his untimely death at age ten in December 1998.
