= Oh So Sharp =

Irish-bred, British-trained Thoroughbred racehorse

- Racing colours of Sheikh Mohammed
- Sire: Kris
- Grandsire: Sharpen Up
- Dam: Oh So Fair
- Damsire: Graustark
- Sex: Mare
- Foaled: 30 March 1982
- Country: Ireland
- Colour: Chestnut
- Breeder: Sheikh Mohammed
- Owner: Sheikh Mohammed
- Trainer: Henry Cecil
- Record: 9: 7-2-0

Major wins
- Solario Stakes (1984); Fillies' Mile (1984); Nell Gwyn Stakes (1985); 1,000 Guineas (1985); Epsom Oaks (1985); St. Leger Stakes (1985)

Awards
- Top-rated European three-year-old filly (1985); Timeform top-rated three-year-old filly (1985); Timeform rating 131

Honours
- Oh So Sharp Stakes at Newmarket

Oh So Sharp (1982–2001) was an Irish-bred, British-trained Thoroughbred racehorse best known for winning the English Fillies' Triple Crown in 1985. In a racing career which lasted from August 1984 until September 1985, she won seven of her nine races, starting favourite on each occasion and never at odds of more than 2/1. She was one of the leading two-year-old fillies of 1984 when she was unbeaten in three races, including the Fillies' Mile. In the following year Oh So Sharp won the 1000 Guineas in record time and then took the Oaks by six lengths before being narrowly beaten in her next two starts in major weight-for-age races. The filly completed the Triple Crown in the St Leger Stakes. She was retired at the end of the season and became a successful broodmare. Oh So Sharp died in 2001 at the age of nineteen.

== Background ==
Oh So Sharp, described by Timeform as "a big, lengthy filly and a grand mover with a raking stride" was bred in Ireland by her owner Sheikh Mohammed. She was one of two classic winners sired by Kris the leading British miler of 1979: the chestnut Oh So Sharp came from his first crop of foals. Her dam was the American-bred mare Oh So Fair, making her a half-sister to Roussalka a filly which won the Coronation Stakes and two runnings of the Nassau Stakes when trained by Henry Cecil in the mid-1970s. She later became a successful broodmare, whose descendants include Collier Hill and Ameerat. Oh So Fair was carrying the unborn Oh So Sharp in October 1981 when she was included in the deal in which Sheikh acquired the Dalham Hall stud.

Oh So Sharp was sent into training at Henry Cecil's Warren Place stables in Newmarket, Suffolk. She was ridden in all of her races as a three-year-old by the American jockey Steve Cauthen. Lester Piggott had ridden Oh So Sharp during 1984, his last season as stable jockey at Warren Place.

== Racing career ==
=== 1984: two-year-old season ===
Oh So Sharp made her racecourse debut in a six furlong maiden race at Nottingham Racecourse in August. Ridden by Paul Eddery as stable jockey Lester Piggott was injured, she started the 1/2 favourite and won easily, despite being given a very gentle introduction by her jockey. In early September, Oh So Sharp was moved up in class and matched against colts in the Group Three Solario Stakes over seven furlongs at Sandown Park. Ridden on this occasion by the stable jockey Lester Piggott, who had been very keen to return from injury to ride her, she took the lead approaching the final furlong and drew clear to win by two lengths at odds of 6/4. The form of the race was boosted when the runner-up, Young Runaway, won the Group Two Champagne Stakes at Doncaster Racecourse two weeks later.

Oh So Sharp's last race of the year was the Hoover Fillies' Mile at Ascot Racecourse in which she started at odds of 6/5. The contest was then a Group Three race, but has subsequently been promoted to Group One.Piggott had the filly in second place before taking the lead at the start of straight and won easily by 1 1/2 lengths from the Prix du Calvados winner Helen Street, who was carrying four pounds more than the winner. In the International Classification produced by the official handicappers of France, Ireland and the United Kingdom, Oh So Sharp was given a rating of 77, five pounds behind the year's highest-rated two-year-old filly Triptych. Piggott reputedly believed her to be the best filly he had ridden since Petite Etoile 25 years before.

=== 1985: three-year-old season ===
==== Spring ====
Oh So Sharp began her three-year-old season on 18 April in the seven furlong Nell Gwyn Stakes at Newmarket Racecourse in which she met Helen Street at level weights and was ridden for the first time by Cauthen as Lester Piggott had ceased to be Henry Cecil ‘s stable jockey due to the dispute between Piggott and Daniel Wildenstein who insisted on other jockeys riding his horses when Piggott did not ride All Along in the 1983 Arc. She won at odds of 8/13, beating Bella Colora by a length, with Helen Street 2 1/2 lengths back in third. Two weeks later, Oh So Sharp was one of seventeen fillies to contest the 1000 Guineas over Newmarket's Rowley Mile course. Racing on unusually firm ground, Oh So Sharp was not among the early leaders and appeared to be struggling in the final quarter mile when the race seemed to lie between Bella Colora and Al Bahathri. In the closing stages however Cauthen produced the favourite with a powerful late run and she caught the leaders in the last stride to win a three-way photo finish by two short heads from Al Bahathri and Bella Colora. The runner-up, owned by Sheikh Mohammed's older brother Hamdan Al-Maktoum went on to win the Irish 1000 Guineas and the Coronation Stakes while Bella Colora won the Prix de l'Opéra in autumn. Oh So Sharp's win gave Sheikh Mohammed a first win in a British Classic and her winning time of 1:36.85 broke the race record which had stood since 1950.

==== Summer ====
On 8 June, Oh So Sharp was moved up in distance for the Oaks (known for sponsorship reasons as the Gold Seal Oaks) at Epsom Downs Racecourse. In this race, which was run on soft ground, she was matched against Triptych who had run poorly in the 1000 Guineas but had then defeated a field of colts in the Irish 2000 Guineas. Cauthen settled the 6/4 favourite behind the leaders and tracked across to the stands side (furthest away from the inside rail) to take advantage of a strip of better ground. Oh So Sharp overtook Triptych two furlongs from the finish and quickly went clear, increasing her advantage throughout the closing stages to win by six lengths. Her win completed a notable double for Cecil and Cauthen, who had won The Derby with Slip Anchor over the same course and distance three days earlier. Cecil said he would "do his damnedest" to keep the pair apart in future races. Timeform rated her performance as the fourth-best seen in the Oaks up to that time, behind those of Petite Etoile, Noblesse, and Dunfermline.

Now unbeaten in six races, Oh So Sharp ran against older horses for the first time in Britain's most prestigious weight-for-age race, the King George VI and Queen Elizabeth Stakes at Ascot on 27 July. She started 4/5 favourites in a field of twelve, with her main rivals in the betting being Rainbow Quest, Strawberry Road, Petoski, and the Irish Derby winner Law Society. Oh So Sharp took the lead early in the straight and got the better of a prolonged struggle with the four-year-old Rainbow Quest but was caught in the closing stages and beaten a neck by Petoski. Oh So Sharp was brought back in distance to contest the Benson & Hedges Gold Cup over 10 1/2 furlongs at York on 20 August. Triptych was again among her opponents, along with the leading four-year-olds Commanche Run and Palace Music, but Oh So Sharp was sent off the 2/5 favourite. Piggott set an unexpectedly slow pace on Commanche Run before accelerating early in the straight catching Cauthen unawares.Oh So Sharp chased the leader throughout the closing stages but never drew level and finished second, beaten three quarters of a length.

==== Autumn ====
Oh So Sharp ended her racing career in the St Leger on the 14 September when she was opposed by five colts in the 209th running of the St Leger over 14 1/2 furlongs. As she had already won the 1000 Guineas and the Oaks she was attempting to complete the fillies' version of the Triple Crown a feat which had last been achieved by Meld in 1955. She started the 8/11 favourite with her closest rival in the betting being her stable companion Lanfranco, winner of the William Hill Futurity and the King Edward VII Stakes. Oh So Sharp moved past Lanfranco in the straight but was unable to draw away from the colt and quickly came under renewed pressure from her stable companion and from the outsider Phardante. Oh So Sharp hung to the right in the closing stages before winning by three-quarters of a length and a head from Phardante and Lanfranco. The racecourse stewards called an inquiry into possible interference caused by the winner but the result was allowed to stand. Cecil admitted that the filly's form had been declining and said that "another week and it might have been too late".

== Assessment ==
Oh So Sharp was given a rating of 131 by the independent Timeform organisation in 1985, making her the highest-rated three-year-old filly of the year. In the official International classification for 1985 she was the top rated filly of her generation by a margin of six pounds. In their book A Century of Champions, based on a modified version of the Timeform system John Randall and Tony Morris rated Oh So Sharp a "superior" Oaks winner and an "average" winner of the St Leger. They placed her twenty-eighth in their list of the best female racehorses trained in Britain and Ireland in the 20th century.

Steve Cauthen called her, "without doubt, the best filly I have ridden."

== Stud record ==
Although reports suggested that Oh So Sharp was to be kept in training as a four-year-old she was retired from racing at the end of 1985 to become a broodmare at the Dalham Hall stud. None of her progeny have been as successful on the track as she was, but she has produced winners in Rosefinch, who won the Prix Saint-Alary, Shaima (USA) (1988, by Shareef Dancer) (Long Island Handicap), Sacho (IRE) (1993, by Sadler's Wells) and Felitza. Shaima, sired by Shareef Dancer, went on to produce the St Leger winner Shantou. Oh So Sharp is dam of Savoire Vivre who is enjoying some success at stud in Tasmania, Australia.

In early 2001, Oh So Sharp began to suffer from laminitis. Her condition deteriorated in the autumn and she was euthanised at the end of October at the age of nineteen.

== Pedigree ==
Pedigree of Oh So Sharp (IRE), chestnut mare, 1982
Sire Kris (GB) 1976	Sharpen Up (GB); 1969	Atan	Native Dancer
Sire Kris (GB) 1976	Sharpen Up (GB); 1969	Atan	Mixed Marriage
Sire Kris (GB) 1976	Sharpen Up (GB); 1969	Rocchetta	Rockfella
Sire Kris (GB) 1976	Sharpen Up (GB); 1969	Rocchetta	Chambiges
Sire Kris (GB) 1976	Doubly Sure (GB); 1971	Reliance	Tantieme
Sire Kris (GB) 1976	Doubly Sure (GB); 1971	Reliance	Relance
Sire Kris (GB) 1976	Doubly Sure (GB); 1971	Soft Angels	Crepello
Sire Kris (GB) 1976	Doubly Sure (GB); 1971	Soft Angels	Sweet Angel
Dam Oh So Fair (USA) 1967	Graustark (USA); 1963	Ribot	Tenerani
Dam Oh So Fair (USA) 1967	Graustark (USA); 1963	Ribot	Romanella
Dam Oh So Fair (USA) 1967	Graustark (USA); 1963	Flower Bowl	Alibhai
Dam Oh So Fair (USA) 1967	Graustark (USA); 1963	Flower Bowl	Flower Bed
Dam Oh So Fair (USA) 1967	Chandelle (USA); 1959	Swaps	Khaled
Dam Oh So Fair (USA) 1967	Chandelle (USA); 1959	Swaps	Iron Reward
Dam Oh So Fair (USA) 1967	Chandelle (USA); 1959	Malindi	Nearco
Dam Oh So Fair (USA) 1967	Chandelle (USA); 1959	Malindi	Mumtaz Begum (Family: 9-c)
