= Sharpen Up =

British-bred Thoroughbred racehorse

- Sire: Atan
- Grandsire: Native Dancer
- Dam: Rocchetta
- Damsire: Rockefella
- Sex: Stallion
- Foaled: 17 March 1969
- Died: 2 March 1992 (aged 22)
- Country: United Kingdom
- Colour: Chestnut
- Breeder: Mimi van Cutsem
- Owner: Mimi van Cutsem
- Trainer: Bernard van Cutsem
- Record: 8: 5-2-0
- Earnings: £19,888

Major wins
- Seaton Delaval Stakes (1971); Middle Park Stakes (1971)

Awards
- Timeform rating 127

Sharpen Up (17 March 1969 – 2 March 1992) was a British racehorse and sire. He was one of the leading European two-year-olds of his generation, winning all five of his races including the Seaton Delaval Stakes and the Middle Park Stakes. He failed to win in three starts in 1972 and was retired to stud. He became a highly successful breeding stallion in both Europe and North America. Sharpen Up died in 1992.

== Background ==
Sharpen Up was a chestnut horse standing 16.1 hands high with a white blaze and white socks on his hind legs bred and owned by Mimi van Cutsem. He was sired by the American stallion Atan, who was retired from racing after winning his only race. His dam, Rocchetta, was a full sister to Outcrop, the winner of the Yorkshire Oaks. Sharpen Up was trained throughout his racing career by Bernard van Cutsem at the Stanley House tables in Newmarket.

== Racing career ==
=== 1971: two-year-old season ===
As a two-year-old in 1971, Sharpen Up was undefeated in five races. He won a maiden race at Leicester Racecourse in June by four lengths and the Cantley Plate at Doncaster before moving up in class to win the Hyperion Stakes at Ascot in July by three lengths and the Seaton Delaval Stakes at Newcastle in August. On his final appearance of the year he contested the Group One Middle Park Stakes over six furlongs at Newmarket Racecourse. Ridden by Willie Carson, he started the 5/6 favourite and won from the New Stakes winner Philip of Spain and the Prix Robert Papin winner Sun Prince.

Despite his successes, Sharpen Up was only the third highest rated colt of his generation in van Cutsem's stable, being ranked behind Crowned Prince and High Top in the Free Handicap.

=== 1972: three-year-old season ===
On his three-year-old debut, Sharpen Up ran in the Greenham Stakes over seven furlongs at Newbury Racecourse and finished second to Martinmas. Sharpen Up missed the 2000 Guineas and did not appear again for three months. He was brought back to sprint distances for the July Cup over six furlongs at Newmarket. He sweated up before the race but ran well to finish second to the filly Parsimony. On his final appearance, he finished unplaced behind Deep Diver in the Nunthorpe Stakes.

== Assessment ==
As a two-year-old, Sharpen Up was given a rating of 127 by the independent Timeform organisation, placing him seven pounds behind the top-rated Deep Diver.

== Stud record ==
Sharpen Up was retired from racing to become a breeding stallion at the Side Hill Stud at Newmarket. In 1980 he was moved to stand at the Gainesway Farm in Kentucky. He was an exceptionally successful sire, whose progeny included:

- Kris (1976) St James's Palace Stakes, Sussex Stakes, Queen Elizabeth II Stakes, Lockinge Stakes
- Sharpo (1977) William Hill Sprint Championship x3, July Cup, Prix de l'Abbaye
- Diesis (1980) Middle Park Stakes, Dewhurst Stakes
- Keen (1981) 2nd St James's Palace Stakes, Heron Stakes
- Pebbles (1981) 1000 Guineas, Eclipse Stakes, Champion Stakes, Breeders' Cup Turf
- Trempolino (1984) Prix de l'Arc de Triomphe
- Sanglamore (1987) Prix du Jockey Club, Prix d'Ispahan
- Selkirk (1988) Queen Elizabeth II Stakes, Lockinge Stakes

Sharpen Up was also the broodmare sire of Mister Baileys, Cadeaux Genereux and Danehill Dancer.

== Pedigree ==
Pedigree of Sharpen Up (GB), chestnut stallion, 1969
Sire Atan (USA) 1961	Native Dancer (USA); 1950	Polynesian	Unbreakable
Sire Atan (USA) 1961	Native Dancer (USA); 1950	Polynesian	Black Polly
Sire Atan (USA) 1961	Native Dancer (USA); 1950	Geisha	Discovery
Sire Atan (USA) 1961	Native Dancer (USA); 1950	Geisha	Miyako
Sire Atan (USA) 1961	Mixed Marriage (GB); 1952	Tudor Minstrel	Owen Tudor
Sire Atan (USA) 1961	Mixed Marriage (GB); 1952	Tudor Minstrel	Sansonnet
Sire Atan (USA) 1961	Mixed Marriage (GB); 1952	Persian Maid	Tehran
Sire Atan (USA) 1961	Mixed Marriage (GB); 1952	Persian Maid	Aroma
Dam Rocchetta (GB) 1961	Rockefella (GB); 1941	Hyperion	Gainsborough
Dam Rocchetta (GB) 1961	Rockefella (GB); 1941	Hyperion	Selene
Dam Rocchetta (GB) 1961	Rockefella (GB); 1941	Rockfel	Felstead
Dam Rocchetta (GB) 1961	Rockefella (GB); 1941	Rockfel	Rockliffe
Dam Rocchetta (GB) 1961	Chambiges (FR); 1949	Majano	Deiri
Dam Rocchetta (GB) 1961	Chambiges (FR); 1949	Majano	Madgi Moto
Dam Rocchetta (GB) 1961	Chambiges (FR); 1949	Chanterelle	Gris Perle
Dam Rocchetta (GB) 1961	Chambiges (FR); 1949	Chanterelle	Shah Bibi (Family: 5-i)
