= Steve Cauthen =

American jockey

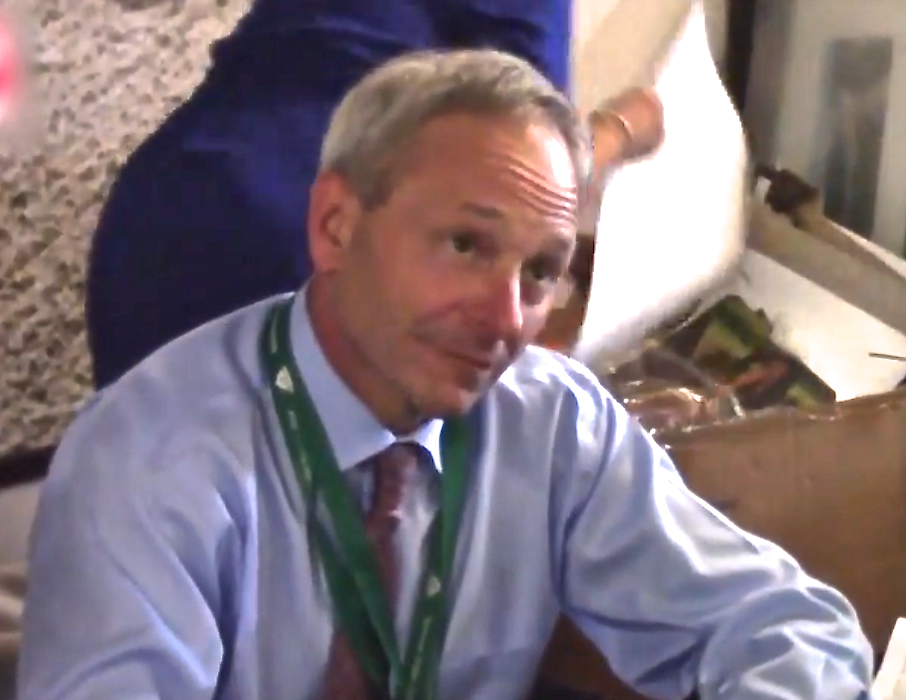
- Steve Cauthen at the 2014 Belmont Stakes

Personal information
- Born: May 1, 1960 (age 66) Walton, Kentucky, U.S.
- Occupation: Jockey

Horse racing career
- Sport: Horse racing
- Career wins: 2,794

Major racing wins
- Excelsior Breeders' Cup Handicap (1977); Whitney Stakes (1977); Hollywood Derby (1978); United States Triple Crown (1978); 2,000 Guineas (1979); 1,000 Guineas (1985); Ascot Gold Cup (1984, 1987); Epsom Derby (1985, 1987); King George VI and Queen Elizabeth Stakes (1987); Epsom Oaks (1985, 1988, 1989); St. Leger Stakes (1985, 1987, 1989); Grand Prix de Saint-Cloud (1983, 1986); Grosser Preis von Baden (1983, 1985); Irish Derby (1989); Irish Oaks (1988, 1991); Derby Italiano (1991); Gran Premio del Jockey Club (1984) Kentucky Derby (1978) Preakness Stakes (1978) Belmont Stakes (1978)

Racing awards
- United States Champion Jockey by earnings (1977); Eclipse Award for Outstanding Apprentice Jockey (1977); Eclipse Award for Outstanding Jockey (1977); Eclipse Award of Merit (1977); George Woolf Memorial Jockey Award (1984); British Champion Jockey (1984, 1985, 1987)

Honours
- Associated Press Athlete of the Year (1977); Sports Illustrated Sportsman of the Year (1977); The Sporting News Sportsman of the Year (1977); Golden Plate Award, American Academy of Achievement (1978); United States Racing Hall of Fame (1994); British Champions Series Hall of Fame (2023)

Significant horses
- Affirmed, Old Vic, Arazi, Mashaallah, Keen Hunter, Possessive Dancer, Diminuendo, Chimes of Freedom, Gold and Ivory, Triptych, Pebbles, Oh So Sharp, Slip Anchor, Reference Point, Saumarez, Never So Bold, Indian Skimmer, Tap On Wood
- Updated on January 16, 2007

1000 Guineas (1)
1985
Oh So Sharp	Al Bahathri	Bella Colora

2000 Guineas (1)
1979
Tap On Wood	Kris	Young Generation

Derby (2)
1985
Slip Anchor	Law Society	Damister
1987
Reference Point	Most Welcome	Bellotto

Oaks (3)
1985
Oh So Sharp	Triptych	Dubian
1988
Diminuendo	Sudden Love	Animatrice
1989
Snow Bride	Aliysa	Roseate Tern

St Leger (3)
1985
Oh So Sharp	Phardante	Lanfranco
1987
Reference Point	Mountain Kingdom	Dry Dock
1989
Michelozzo	Sapience	Roseate Tern

Steve Cauthen (born May 1, 1960) is a retired American jockey.

In 1977 he became the first jockey to win over $6 million in a year working with agent Lenny Goodman, and in 1978 he became the youngest jockey to win the U. S. Triple Crown. Cauthen is the only jockey ever named Sports Illustrated Sportsman of the Year.

After riding for a few years in the United States, he began racing in Europe. He is the only jockey to have won both the Kentucky Derby and the Epsom Derby.

== Background ==
Cauthen, the son of a trainer and a farrier, grew up in Walton, Kentucky, around horses, which (along with his small size) made race-riding a logical career choice.

== Racing career ==
=== North America ===
He rode his first race on May 12, 1976, at Churchill Downs at age 16; he finished last, riding King of Swat. He rode his first winner (Red Pipe) less than a week later, at River Downs. He was the nation's leader in race wins in 1977 with 487. In only his second year of riding, he became the first jockey to win $6 million in a single season, passing that mark in December 1977.

In 1978 he became the youngest jockey to ever win the U. S. Triple Crown, riding Affirmed, and he was named Sports Illustrated Sportsman of the Year.

He had increasing problems making weight and moved to the UK, where jockey weights were higher.

=== Europe ===
A June 16, 1985, feature story in the New York Times titled "Cauthen's Success Amazes Britain" said "Cauthen was lured to Britain by Robert Sangster." Quoting The Guardian newspaper's Richard Baerlein, a respected racing correspondent for more than 50 years in England, as saying that "He's matured into the perfect jockey." The Times story also reported that "Henry Cecil signed Cauthen to replace Piggott as the main jockey for his powerful stable."

In his first race in the UK in April 1979 Cauthen rode Marquee Universal to victory at Salisbury.

Steve Cauthen was British Champion Jockey three times, and won English classic races ten times, including the 2,000 Guineas, the Derby twice, and the St Leger three times. In 1985 he won three Classics riding Oh So Sharp. In 1989 he rode European Horse of the Year Old Vic to victory in the French Derby and the Irish Derby. In 1991 he won the Italian Derby on Hailsham.

== Retirement ==
After he finished his riding career, Cauthen returned to Kentucky and bought a stud farm. He participated in Prince Edward of the United Kingdom's 1987 charity television special The Grand Knockout Tournament.

In 1999, the Racing Post ranked Cauthen as eighth in their list of the Top 50 jockeys of the 20th century.

Cauthen and his wife, Amy settled back in Walton and have three daughters.

== Major winners ==
(United Kingdom) Great Britain

- 1,000 Guineas - Oh So Sharp (1985)
- 2,000 Guineas - Tap on Wood (1979)
- Derby - Slip Anchor (1985), Reference Point (1987)
- King George VI and Queen Elizabeth Stakes - Reference Point (1987)
- Oaks - Oh So Sharp (1985), Diminuendo (1988), Snow Bride (1989)
- St. Leger - Oh So Sharp (1985), Reference Point (1987), Michelozzo (1989)
- Goodwood Cup - Heighlin (1982), Gildoran (1984)
- Yorkshire Oaks - Diminuendo (1988)
- International Stakes - Cormorant Wood (1984), Triptych (1987), In the Groove (1990)
- Nunthorpe Stakes - Sharpo (1982), Never So Bold (1985)
- July Cup - Never So Bold (1985)
- Falmouth Stakes - Meis El-Reem (1984), Chimes of Freedom (1990)
- Cheveley Park Stakes - Desirable (1983)
- Middle Park Stakes - Creag-An-Sgor (1983), Gallic League (1987), Balla Cove (1989), Zieten (1992)
- Sun Chariot Stakes - Cormorant Wood (1983)
- Lockinge Stakes - Motavato (1982), Cormorant Wood (1984)
- Doncaster Cup - Spicy Story (1985)
- Coronation Cup - Time Charter (1984), Triptych (1988), In the Groove (1991)
- Coronation Stakes - Chimes of Freedom (1990)
- King's Stand Stakes - Indian Ridge (1989), Elbio (1991)
- St James's Palace Stakes - Horage (1983), Shavian (1990)
- Ascot Gold Cup - Gildoran (1984), Paean (1987)
- Eclipse Stakes - Pebbles (1985)
- Futurity Trophy - Be My Chief (1989), Peter Davies (1990)
- Nassau Stakes - Nom de Plume (1987)
- Prince of Wales's Stakes - Kind of Hush (1982), Stagecraft (1991)
- British Champions Sprint Stakes - Never So Bold (1984), Wolfhound (1992)
- Champion Stakes - Cormorant Wood (1983), In the Groove (1990)
- Princess Royal Stakes - Snow Bride (1989)

France

- Grand Prix de Paris - Risk Me (1987), Saumarez (1990)
- Prix du Jockey Club - Old Vic (1989)
- Prix de Saint-Georges - Elbio (1992)
- Prix de Diane - Indian Skimmer (1987)
- Prix Royal-Oak - El Cuite (1986)
- Prix de l'Abbaye de Longchamp - Committed (1984), Keen Hunter (1991)
- Grand Prix de Saint-Cloud - Diamond Shoal (1983), Acatenango (1986)
- Prix Jean Prat - Lapierre (1988), Kitwood (1992)
- Prix Maurice de Gheest - Never So Bold (1984)
- Prix Jacques Le Marois - Lirung (1986)
- Prix d'Ispahan - Indian Skimmer (1989)
- Prix Saint-Alary - Indian Skimmer (1987), Rosefinch (1992)

(Republic of Ireland) Ireland

- Irish 1,000 Guineas - In the Groove (1990)
- Irish Derby - Old Vic (1989)
- Irish Oaks - Diminuendo (dead heat 1988), Possessive Dancer (1991)
- Irish St. Leger - Mashaallah (1992)
- Moyglare Stud Stakes - Chimes of Freedom (1989)
- Tattersalls Gold Cup - Opera House (1992)

Italy

- Gran Premio di Milano - Diamond Shoal (1983), Mashaallah (1992)
- Derby Italiano - Hailsham (1991)
- Gran Criterium - Tanque Verde (1985)
- Gran Premio del Jockey Club - Gold and Ivory (1984)
- Premio Roma - Orban (1987)

Germany

- Bayerisches Zuchtrennen - Imperial Fling (1979)
- Grosser Preis von Baden - Diamond Shoal (1983), Gold and Ivory (1984)
- Preis von Europa - Gold and Ivory (1984)
- Grosser Preis von Bayern - Almaarad (1988)

United States

- Kentucky Derby - Affirmed (1978)
- Preakness Stakes - Affirmed (1978)
- Belmont Stakes - Affirmed (1978)
- Hollywood Derby - Affirmed (1978)
- Santa Anita Derby - Affirmed (1978)
- United Nations Stakes - Noble Dancer (1978)
- Joe Hirsch Turf Classic Stakes - Johnny D. (1977)
- Malibu Stakes - J. O. Tobin (1978)
- Belmont Futurity Stakes - Affirmed (1977)
- Laurel Futurity Stakes - Affirmed (1977)
- Hopeful Stakes - Affirmed (1977)
- Whitney Stakes - Nearly On Time (1977)
