= Kris (horse) =

British-bred Thoroughbred racehorse

- Sire: Sharpen Up
- Grandsire: Atan
- Dam: Doubly Sure
- Damsire: Reliance
- Sex: Stallion
- Foaled: 1976
- Country: Great Britain
- Colour: Chestnut
- Breeder: Lord Howard de Walden
- Owner: Lord Howard de Walden
- Trainer: Henry Cecil
- Record: 16: 14-2-0
- Earnings: £195,670

Major wins
- Horris Hill Stakes (1978); Greenham Stakes (1979); St James's Palace Stakes (1979); Sussex Stakes (1979); Waterford Crystal Mile (1979); Queen Elizabeth II Stakes (1979); Challenge Stakes (1979); Lockinge Stakes (1980)

Awards
- Timeform rating: 123 (1978), 135 (1979), 134 (1980); Timeform Best Miler (1979); Gilbey Champion Miler (1979); Champion European Older Miler (1980); Leading sire in Great Britain & Ireland (1985)
- Last updated on 29 July 2022

Kris (1976–2004) was a British Thoroughbred racehorse. As a two-year-old in 1978 he was unbeaten in four races, including the Horris Hill Stakes, but was rated some way below the best of his generation. In the following year he won the Greenham Stakes on his debut before being defeated by half a length by Tap On Wood when favourite for the classic 2000 Guineas. He went on to dominate British racing over one mile for the rest of 1979, winning the Heron Stakes, St James's Palace Stakes, Sussex Stakes, Waterford Crystal Mile, Queen Elizabeth II Stakes and Challenge Stakes, earning comparisons with Brigadier Gerard. As a four-year-old he won the Lockinge Stakes but was off the course with injury problems for much of the season and was narrowly beaten by Known Fact when attempting to repeat his previous win in the Queen Elizabeth II Stakes. He retired from racing with a record of fourteen wins and two second places from sixteen starts. Kris went on to become a very successful breeding stallion, siring the classic winning fillies Oh So Sharp and Unite and being Leading sire in Great Britain & Ireland in 1985. He died in 2004.

== Background ==
Kris was a dark chestnut horse with white socks on his hind feet, bred in England by his owner, Lord Howard de Walden. He was sired by Sharpen Up and was the first foal of the broodmare Doubly Sure, making him a full brother to the champion two-year-old Diesis, and Keen and a half-brother to several other good winners including Presidium and Rudimentary (Sandown Mile).

The colt was named after a type of double-edged Malayan dagger. He was trained throughout his racing career by Henry Cecil at his Warren Place stable in Newmarket, Suffolk and was ridden in all of his races by Joe Mercer.

== Racing career ==
=== 1978: two-year-old season ===
Kris ran four times as a two-year-old, winning all his starts. He began his racing career by winning a five furlong maiden race at Leicester Racecourse in June. In the following month he carried top weight in a minor race at Folkestone Racecourse. He won the race but became "jarred up" on the hard ground and did not race again until the autumn. He returned in October for the Marston Moor Stakes at York, in which he was matched against five opponents, all of whom had winning form. He was among the leaders from the start and accelerated clear in the closing stages to win by eight lengths from Touch Boy. Later that month he was moved up in class and started the 5/6 favourite for the Group Three Horris Hill Stakes over seven furlongs at Newbury. On this occasion, Mercer adopted different tactics and attempted to restrain Kris in the early stages. He expended a great deal of energy struggling against his jockey's efforts and looked beaten when Hardgreen went to the front, but rallied strongly in the final strides to win by a neck, with a gap of eight lengths back to Saher in third.

=== 1979: three-year-old season ===
On his debut as a three-year-old Kris started 11/10 favourite for the Group Three Greenham Stakes at Newbury in which he was reopposed by Hardgreen, as well as the Guy Harwood-trained Young Generation. Looking very fit before the race he easily accounted for Hardgreen, but having his race seemingly won he was bustled up by Young Generation and Kris had to reassert himself before winning by three lengths. As the stable had already won the Craven Stakes with Lyphard's Wish, when stable jockey elected to ride Kris he became favourite for the 2,000 Guineas, despite reports that he had some training problems. In the race he was beaten half a length by the 20/1 outsider Tap On Wood and only just retained second in a close finish with Young Generation, who appeared somewhat unlucky in running. Cecil decided to give Kris more experience before Royal Ascot and he was sent to Kempton where he won the Heron Stakes easily from Blue Refrain despite being hampered on the final turn.

At Royal Ascot in June he started second favourite for the St James's Palace Stakes behind Young Generation who, since the Guineas, had won both the Lockinge Stakes and the Prix Jean Prat. Kris led for most of the way and won by one and a half lengths from Young Generation with a long gap back to the Clive Brittain-trained Alert in third. In his next race, Kris was matched against older horses for the first time in the Group One Sussex Stakes at Goodwood in which he was opposed by the July Cup winner Thatching and the Champion Stakes winner Swiss Maid. Starting the 4/5 favourite he took the lead two furlongs from the finish and drew away from his opponent to win by five lengths from Swiss Maid, with Alert in third. Over the same course and distance three weeks later, the colt started 3/10 favourite for the Group Two Waterford Crystal Mile. Mercer again experimented with waiting tactics and turned into the straight in fifth place behind Radeztky, Jellaby, Fair Season and Swiss Maid. He produced a strong finishing run to take the lead a furlong out and won by three-quarters of a length from Jellaby, with Foveros and Lightning Label close behind in third and fourth.

In late September Kris started 8/11 favourite for the Queen Elizabeth II Stakes at Ascot despite carrying seven pounds more than weight-for-age. He drew away in the last quarter mile to win by five lengths from Foveros, with Jellaby three lengths back in third. Despite rumours that he would move up in distance for the Champion Stakes at Newmarket in October, the colt was actually dropped back in trip to end the 1979 season with a run in the Challenge Stakes over seven furlongs at the same course. Starting at odds of 4/9 he broke the course record for a three-year-old as he won by two and a half lengths from the Diadem Stakes winner Absalom. Although Kris easily defeated all his British rivals, he was never matched against his contemporary Irish River. The French colt won the French 2,000 Guineas and was dominant over one mile in France, beating Lyphard's Wish (Kris's stable companion) in the Prix du Moulin. Timeform rated Kris 4 lb. superior to Irish River.

=== 1980: four-year-old season ===
As a four-year-old, Kris began his season with two runs in May. In the Cold Shields Windows Trophy over seven furlongs at Haydock Park he looked less than fully fit but won from three opponents and set a new course record. At Newbury later that month he started 4/9 favourite for the Lockinge Stakes despite conceding seven pounds to his opponents. Looking very impressive before the race, Kris struggled to obtain a clear run but eventually gained the advantage in the closing stages to win by three quarters of a length from Foveros. For the second time in succession, he set a new course record although his win was only confirmed after a stewards' inquiry into possible interference caused when he forced his way through the field to deliver his winning run.

His season was disrupted by several minor injuries, including a muscle strain which ruled him out of the Queen Anne Stakes and prevented him moving up to ten furlongs for the Eclipse Stakes. Other targets, including the Sussex Stakes and the Waterford Crystal Mile came and went before he eventually returned in the Crown of Crowns Stakes, a minor race over a mile at Goodwood in September. He was somewhat reluctant to enter the starting stalls, but won by twelve lengths from moderate opposition to record his ninth consecutive victory. On his final appearance he attempted to win a second successive Queen Elizabeth II Stakes at Ascot in October and started favourite ahead of the 1980 2000 Guineas winner Known Fact. Kris took the lead on the final turn and went two lengths clear but was eventually worn down by Known Fact and beaten a neck after "a tremendous battle". Kris' connections offered no excuses, admitting that they had been beaten by a very good horse on the day.

== Assessment ==
In the International Classification for 1978, Kris was given a rating of 82, nine pounds behind the top-rated two-year-old Tromos. The independent Timeform organisation gave him a rating of 123, placing him eleven pounds behind Tromos and commented that he would probably improve but would need to "settle much better ... to have any hope of staying much beyond a mile". In the following year, Kris was rated the fifth-best three-year-old in Europe, level with the French miler Irish River, but behind Three Troikas, Troy, Le Marmot and Top Ville. Timeform rated him more highly, making him their Best Miler of the season with a rating of 135, and the second best horse of any age, two pounds behind Troy. Timeform's annual Racehorses of 1979 described him as "most genuine, reliable and enthusiastic" and that he had dominated the mile division to a greater extent than any horse since Brigadier Gerard. He was also named Champion Miler in the Gilbey Racing Awards, based on points accrued from performances in major races. In 1980, Timeform rated him on 134, a pound behind their Best Miler Known Fact and three behind their Horse of the Year Moorestyle. In the International Classification he was rated the fourth-best horse in Europe behind Moorestyle, Ela-Mana-Mou and Argument.

== Stud record ==
After being syndicated with a value of £4 million Kris stood at his owner's Thornton Stud near Thirsk, before moving to the Plantation Stud at Newmarket in 1994. He sired Oh So Sharp, winner of the 1,000 Guineas, Epsom Oaks and St. Leger in 1985, and Unite, winner of the Epsom Oaks in 1987. Kris was retired from active stud duty in 2002 and died of heart failure two years later at the age of twenty-eight.

== Pedigree ==
Pedigree of Kris (GB), chestnut stallion, 1976
| Sire Sharpen Up (GB) 1969 | Atan; 1961 | Native Dancer | Polynesian |
| Sire Sharpen Up (GB) 1969 | Atan; 1961 | Native Dancer | Geisha |
| Sire Sharpen Up (GB) 1969 | Atan; 1961 | Mixed Marriage | Tudor Minstrel |
| Sire Sharpen Up (GB) 1969 | Atan; 1961 | Mixed Marriage | Persian Maid |
| Sire Sharpen Up (GB) 1969 | Rocchetta; 1961 | Rockefella | Hyperion |
| Sire Sharpen Up (GB) 1969 | Rocchetta; 1961 | Rockefella | Rockfel |
| Sire Sharpen Up (GB) 1969 | Rocchetta; 1961 | Chambiges | Majano |
| Sire Sharpen Up (GB) 1969 | Rocchetta; 1961 | Chambiges | Chanterelle |
| Dam Doubly Sure (FR) 1971 | Reliance; 1962 | Tantieme | Deux-Pour-Cent |
| Dam Doubly Sure (FR) 1971 | Reliance; 1962 | Tantieme | Terka |
| Dam Doubly Sure (FR) 1971 | Reliance; 1962 | Relance | Relic |
| Dam Doubly Sure (FR) 1971 | Reliance; 1962 | Relance | Polaire |
| Dam Doubly Sure (FR) 1971 | Soft Angels; 1963 | Crepello | Donatello |
| Dam Doubly Sure (FR) 1971 | Soft Angels; 1963 | Crepello | Crepuscule |
| Dam Doubly Sure (FR) 1971 | Soft Angels; 1963 | Sweet Angel | Honeyway |
| Dam Doubly Sure (FR) 1971 | Soft Angels; 1963 | Sweet Angel | No Angel (Family:2-o) |
