= Distant Relative =

Irish-bred Thoroughbred racehorse

- Sire: Habitat
- Grandsire: Sir Gaylord
- Dam: Royal Sister
- Damsire: Claude
- Sex: Stallion
- Foaled: 10 March 1986
- Country: Ireland
- Colour: Bay
- Breeder: Airlie Stud
- Owner: Wafic Said
- Trainer: Barry Hills
- Record: 18: 8-4-5
- Earnings: £542,060

Major wins
- Phoenix International Stakes (1989); Hungerford Stakes (1989); Celebration Mile (1989); Challenge Stakes (1989); Sussex Stakes (1990); Prix du Moulin (1990)

Distant Relative (10 March 1986 – 26 November 2005) was an Irish-bred British-trained Thoroughbred racehorse and sire. After running fifth on his debut he never finished unplaced again ending his racing career with a record of eight wins and nine places from eighteen starts. He emerged as top-class miler in 1989, recording wins in the Phoenix International Stakes, Hungerford Stakes, Celebration Mile and Challenge Stakes. He was even better as a four-year-old in 1990, winning the Sussex Stakes and the Prix du Moulin. He was also placed in many important races including the Irish 2000 Guineas, Queen Elizabeth Stakes and Prix Jacques Le Marois. On his retirement from racing he stood as a breeding stallion and had some success as a sire of winners. He died in Turkey in 2005 at the age of nineteen.

== Background ==
Distant Relative was a bay horse with no white markings bred in County Kildare by the Airlie Stud. He was sired by Habitat, an American-bred, British-raced miler who became one of the leading European stallions of the 1970s and 1980s. His other progeny included Habibti, Marwell, Rose Bowl, Flying Water, Homing and Sigy and he was the British Champion broodmare sire on three occasions. Distant Relative's dam went on to produce the top-class ten furlong performer Ezzoud and, as a descendant of the influential broodmare Vagrancy, was related to many important winners including Black Tarquin, Ferdinand and Questing.

The colt was acquired by Wafic Said and was sent into training with Barry Hills at Lambourn. He was ridden in fourteen of his eighteen races by his trainer's son Michael. He reportedly moved "appallingly" in his slower paces with Barry Hills saying that riding him was "like going down a road in a car with no tyres".

== Racing career ==
=== 1988: two-year-old season ===
Distant Relative began his racing career in a seven furlong maiden race at Goodwood Racecourse on 29 July and finished fifth of the thirteen runners behind Regent Light. It was the only time in his racing career that he finished worse than third. In the Linenhall Stakes over six furlongs at Chester Racecourse in August he started the 5/4 favourite and finished second, beaten eight lengths by the 33/1 outsider Ahsanta Sana. The colt recorded his first win on his final appearance of the year, beating Timourtash by two and a half lengths in a six furlong maiden at Newbury Racecourse on 17 September.

=== 1989: three-year-old season ===
Distant Relative began his second season by carrying 128 pounds in a seven furlong handicap race at Newmarket Racecourse on 18 April and won from nineteen opponents. The colt was then moved up sharply in class when he was sent to Ireland for the Irish 2000 Guineas at the Curragh on 20 May. He started a 25/1 outsider and stayed on strongly in the closing stages to finish third behind Shaadi and Great Commotion with the favourite Danehill in fourth place. At Royal Ascot in June he was dropped back in distance for the seven furlong Jersey Stakes and finished third behind Zilzal and Russian Royal.

On 8 July, Distant Relative was sent to Ireland for a second time for the Phoenix International Stakes at Phoenix Park Racecourse and started third choice in the betting behind Executive Perk (winner of the Concorde Stakes) and the Henry Cecil-trained Monsagem. He recorded his first Group race win, beating Sagamore and Executive Perk by two lengths and a head. In August, the colt dropped back to seven furlongs for the Hungerford Stakes at Newbury Racecourse in which he started 5/1 third favourite behind Great Commotion and the Oak Tree Stakes winner Kerita. Distant Relative took the lead approaching the last quarter mile and won by one and a half lengths from Great Commotion. Two weeks later, Distant Relative and Great Commotion met again in the Celebration Mile at Goodwood, for which the betting was headed by the four-year-old Reprimand, the winner of the Gimcrack Stakes, Earl of Sefton Stakes and the Sandown Mile. Distant Relative was last of the five runners entering the straight before accelerating into the lead a furlong from the finish and winning by two and a half length from Great Commotion.

On 30 September, Distant Relative was one of five horses to contest the Group One Queen Elizabeth II Stakes at Ascot and finished third behind Zilzal and Polish Precedent. Distant Relative ended his second season in the Group Two Challenge Stakes over seven furlongs at Newmarket. After being restrained by Hills in the early stages he took the lead approaching the final furlong and won by one and a half lengths from Dancing Tribute.

=== 1990: four-year-old season ===
On his first appearance as a four-year-old Distant Relative finished second to Safawan in the Lockinge Stakes at Newbury in May, after being hampered a quarter of a mile from the finish. In June at Royal Ascot he started 9/4 second favourite behind Safawan for the Queen Anne Stakes. After taking the lead in the straight he was unable to quicken in the closing stages and finished third behind Markofdistinction and Mirror Black. On 7 July the colt attempted to repeat his 1989 success in the Phoenix International Stakes, but was beaten into second place by the Paul Cole-trained Zoman.

On 1 August, Distant Relative was one of seven horses to contest the Sussex Stakes at Goodwood in which he was ridden by the veteran Scottish jockey Willie Carson. The three-year-old colt Shavian started favourite ahead of Green Line Express (runner-up in 1989) with Distant Relative next in the betting at odds of 4/1. The other runners were Great Commotion, Zoman, Lord Charmer and Call To Arms. Carson settled the colt in last place as Shavian set the pace from Green Line Express before beginning to make progress on the inside rail as the field entered the straight. Distant Relative maintained his run along the rail, took the lead from Shavian a furlong from the finish and held off a late challenge from Green Line Express to win by half a length with Shavian a length away in third place. Eleven days after his win at Goodwood, the colt was sent to France for the Prix Jacques Le Marois over 1600 metres at Deauville Racecourse in which he was ridden by Pat Eddery. After taking the lead 200 metres from the finish he was overtaken in the closing stages and finished third behind the French-trained three-year-old colts Priolo and Linamix.

Distant Relative returned to France for the Prix du Moulin at Longchamp Racecourse on 2 September. Priolo and Linamix were again in opposition whilst the other runners were Val de Bois (Prix de Guiche), Pole Position (Prix de Meautry) and the pacemaker Reinstate. In a closely contested finish, Distant Relative won by a short head and three quarters of length from Linamix and Priolo. Distant Relative ended his racing career in the Queen Elizabeth II Stakes at Ascot on 29 September. He took the lead a furlong out before finishing second to Markofdistinction, with the pair finishing eight lengths clear of Green Line Express in third. The unplaced runners included Shavian, Linamix and Tirol.

== Stud record ==
Distant Relative was retired from racing to become a breeding stallion at the Whitsbury Manor Stud in Hampshire. After standing for six seasons in Britain he was sold and sent to Turkey in 1998. He died of intestinal disease on 26 November 2005. The best of his offspring included Bin Rosie (Hungerford Stakes), Atavus (Hungerford Stakes, Criterion Stakes), Iftiraas (Fred Darling Stakes, Matron Stakes), Star of Akkar (Prix Vanteaux, Prix Chloé, Prix de la Nonette), Distant Valley (Rockfel Stakes), Luxor (Topkapi Trophy), My Branch (Firth of Clyde Stakes) and Misty Miss (Molecomb Stakes).

== Pedigree ==
Pedigree of Distant Relative (IRE), bay stallion, 1986
Sire Habitat (USA) 1966	Sir Gaylord (USA); 1959	Turn-To	Royal Charger
Sire Habitat (USA) 1966	Sir Gaylord (USA); 1959	Turn-To	Source Sucree
Sire Habitat (USA) 1966	Sir Gaylord (USA); 1959	Somethingroyal	Princequillo
Sire Habitat (USA) 1966	Sir Gaylord (USA); 1959	Somethingroyal	Imperatrice
Sire Habitat (USA) 1966	Little Hut (USA); 1952	Occupy	Bull Dog
Sire Habitat (USA) 1966	Little Hut (USA); 1952	Occupy	Miss Bunting
Sire Habitat (USA) 1966	Little Hut (USA); 1952	Savage Beauty	Challenger
Sire Habitat (USA) 1966	Little Hut (USA); 1952	Savage Beauty	Khara
Dam Royal Sister (IRE) 1977	Claude (ITY); 1964	Hornbeam	Hyperion
Dam Royal Sister (IRE) 1977	Claude (ITY); 1964	Hornbeam	Thicket
Dam Royal Sister (IRE) 1977	Claude (ITY); 1964	Aigue-Vive	Vatellor
Dam Royal Sister (IRE) 1977	Claude (ITY); 1964	Aigue-Vive	Vice-Versa
Dam Royal Sister (IRE) 1977	Ribasha (USA); 1967	Ribot	Tenerani
Dam Royal Sister (IRE) 1977	Ribasha (USA); 1967	Ribot	Romanella
Dam Royal Sister (IRE) 1977	Ribasha (USA); 1967	Natasha	Nasrullah
Dam Royal Sister (IRE) 1977	Ribasha (USA); 1967	Natasha	Vagrancy (Family:13-c)
