= Smokey Lady =

Irish-bred Thoroughbred racehorse

- Sire: Habitat
- Grandsire: Sir Gaylord
- Dam: A. 1.
- Damsire: Abernant
- Sex: Mare
- Foaled: 9 March 1977
- Country: Ireland
- Colour: Grey
- Trainer: Dermot Weld
- Record: 5: 2-0-2

Major wins
- Phoenix Stakes (1979)

Awards
- Timeform rating 109 (1979)

Honours
- Top-rated Irish 2-y-o Filly (1979)

Smokey Lady (9 March 1977 – after 1982) was an Irish Thoroughbred racehorse and broodmare. Racing only as a two-year-old in 1979 she won two of her five races including the Phoenix Stakes, which was then Ireland's premier race for juveniles. She was also placed in the Queen Mary Stakes and the Prix du Petit Couvert and ended the year as Ireland's top-rated two-year-old filly. She made no impact as a broodmare.

== Background ==
Smokey Lady was a "compact" grey mare bred in Ireland. She was sent into training with Dermot Weld at the Curragh, County Kildare. She was ridden in most of her races by Wally Swinburn.

She was from the seventh crop of foals sired by Habitat, an American-bred, British-raced miler who became one of the leading European stallions of the 1970s and 1980s. His other progeny included Habibti, Flying Water, Marwell, Rose Bowl and Steinlen and he was the British Champion broodmare sire on three occasions. Smokey Lady's dam A. 1 showed little ability as a racehorse but was a successful broodmare who produced several other winners including Steel Heart and was the female-line ancestor of King of Kings.

== Racing career ==
=== 1979: two-year-old season ===
After finishing unplaced on her first appearance, Smokey Lady recorded her first win in a maiden race over five furlongs at Phoenix Park Racecourse in May, taking the race in impressive style by five lengths from Pitmarie. In the following month she was stepped up in class when she was sent to England and started second favourite for the Queen Mary Stakes at Royal Ascot. She showed good early speed and led the field until the final furlong when she was overtaken and beaten into third place by Abeer and Teacher's Pet. Smokey Lady was then matched against colts in the Phoenix Stakes at Phoenix Park which was at the time the only Group 1 race in Ireland restricted to juveniles. In a finish dominated by fillies she prevailed by a lengths from the odds-on favourite Monroe, with Pitmarie half a length back in third. On 21 October the filly was sent to France and matched against older horses in the Prix du Petit Couvert over 1000 metres at Longchamp Racecourse, a race which saw her start second favourite behind the three-year-old Sigy. She was among the leaders from the start and finished third of the eleven runners behind Manjam and Standaan.

In the Irish Free Handicap for 1979, Smokey Lady was assigned a weight of 122 pounds, making her the top-rated two-year-old filly of the year in Ireland. The independent Timeform organisation gave her a rating of 109, making her eleven pounds inferior to their top juvenile filly Aryenne.

== Breeding record ==
Smokey Lady did not race after the end of her two-year-old and was retired to become a broodmare. Her only known foal was Manela Lady, a brown filly foaled in 1982, sired by Ela-Mana-Mou.

== Pedigree ==
Pedigree of Smokey Lady (IRE), grey mare, 1977
Sire Habitat (USA) 1966	Sir Gaylord (USA); 1959	Turn-To	Royal Charger
Sire Habitat (USA) 1966	Sir Gaylord (USA); 1959	Turn-To	Source Sucree
Sire Habitat (USA) 1966	Sir Gaylord (USA); 1959	Somethingroyal	Princequillo
Sire Habitat (USA) 1966	Sir Gaylord (USA); 1959	Somethingroyal	Imperatrice
Sire Habitat (USA) 1966	Little Hut (USA); 1952	Occupy	Bull Dog
Sire Habitat (USA) 1966	Little Hut (USA); 1952	Occupy	Miss Bunting
Sire Habitat (USA) 1966	Little Hut (USA); 1952	Savage Beauty	Challenger
Sire Habitat (USA) 1966	Little Hut (USA); 1952	Savage Beauty	Khara
Dam A. 1 (GB) 1963	Abernant (GB); 1946	Owen Tudor	Hyperion
Dam A. 1 (GB) 1963	Abernant (GB); 1946	Owen Tudor	Mary Tudor
Dam A. 1 (GB) 1963	Abernant (GB); 1946	Rustom Mahal	Rustom Pasha
Dam A. 1 (GB) 1963	Abernant (GB); 1946	Rustom Mahal	Mumtaz Mahal
Dam A. 1 (GB) 1963	Asti Spumante (GB); 1947	Dante	Nearco
Dam A. 1 (GB) 1963	Asti Spumante (GB); 1947	Dante	Rosy Legend
Dam A. 1 (GB) 1963	Asti Spumante (GB); 1947	Blanco	Blandford
Dam A. 1 (GB) 1963	Asti Spumante (GB); 1947	Blanco	Snow Storm (Family:7)
