= Roussalka (horse) =

British-bred Thoroughbred racehorse ((1972–1996)

- Sire: Habitat
- Grandsire: Sir Gaylord
- Dam: Oh So Fair
- Damsire: Graustark
- Sex: Mare
- Foaled: 1972
- Country: United Kingdom
- Colour: Bay
- Breeder: Dalham Hall Stud Farms Ltd
- Owner: Nicky Phillips
- Trainer: Henry Cecil
- Record: 17:7-3-1

Major wins
- Cherry Hinton Stakes (1974); Princess Margaret Stakes (1974); Coronation Stakes (1975); Nassau Stakes (1975, 1976)

Awards
- Timeform rating 116 (1974), 123 (1975), 123 (1976)
- Last updated on 5 March 2025

Roussalka (1972 – 1996) was a British Thoroughbred racehorse and broodmare. In a racing career which lasted from May 1974 until July 1976 she won seven of her seventeen races and was placed on four occasions. As a two-year-old in 1974 she won four races including the Cherry Hinton Stakes and the Princess Margaret Stakes. In the following year, she showed her best form in summer, winning the Coronation Stakes and the Nassau Stakes. In 1976 she ran only three times, but became the first filly to win the Nassau Stakes for a second time. She was then retired from racing and became a very successful broodmare.

== Background ==
Roussalka was a "strong, robust" mare with a white star and snip and white socks on her hind legs bred by the Newmarket-based Dalham Hall Stud. Although she was bred in the United Kingdom, her immediate antecedents were all bred in the United States. She was sired by Habitat, an American-bred, British-raced miler who became one of the leading European stallions of the 1970s and 1980s. His other progeny included Habibti, Flying Water, Marwell, Rose Bowl and Steinlen and he was the British Champion broodmare sire on three occasions. Roussalka was first foal of the American-bred mare Oh So Fair who went on to produce Our Home (winner of the Child Stakes and runner-up in the 1000 Guineas), Etienne Gerard (Jersey Stakes) and the Fillies' Triple Crown winner Oh So Sharp.

As a yearling, Roussalka was offered for sale and bought for 21,000 guineas by Nicky Phillips, the owner of the Someries Stud. The filly was sent into training with Henry Cecil at his Marriott House stable in Newmarket.

== Racing career ==
=== 1974: two-year-old season ===
On her racecourse debut, Roussalka won a maiden race over five furlongs at Yarmouth Racecourse in May. On her next appearance in the Errol Stakes over the same distance at Ascot Racecourse in June she looked outpaced in the early stages but stayed on strongly to finish second, beaten a neck by the colt Raffindale. In July, the filly was moved up in class and distance to contest the Cherry Hinton Stakes over six furlongs at Newmarket Racecourse in which she was ridden by Lester Piggott and started at odds of 2/1. She took the lead a furlong and a half from the finish and went clear of her rivals, despite hanging left in the closing stages and won by four lengths from Mirthful Flirt. Over the same distance at Ascot in July she started the 4/9 favourite for the Princess Margaret Stakes. She showed impressive acceleration to take the lead approaching the final furlong and won by three length from Star of Bagdad giving Lester Piggott his 3,000th flat race win. Roussalka was less impressive when winning the Burmah Castrol Stakes at Kempton Park Racecourse on 31 August, prevailing by only a neck from Honey Pot. Henry Cecil reportedly said the filly had been unsuited by the slow early pace which led to the race developing into a two furlong sprint.

At Newmarket in October, Roussalka contested a very strong renewal of the Cheveley Park Stakes in which she finished fourth behind Cry of Truth, Delmora and Rose Bowl staying on in the closing stages without ever looking likely to win.

=== 1975: three-year-old season ===
Roussalka took a long time to reach full fitness as a three-year-old and did not contest either the 1000 Guineas or the Oaks Stakes after running poorly in trial races: she was unplaced behind Rose Bowl in Nell Gwyn Stakes at Newmarket in April and unplaced again when moved up in distance for the Musidora Stakes at York Racecourse in May, finishing unplaced behind Moonlight Night, May Hill and Tender Camilla.

At Royal Ascot in June, the filly was dropped back in distance to contest the Coronation Stakes over one mile. Starting at odds of 9/1 she returned to her best form, drawing clear of her rivals in the straight to win by four lengths from Tender Camilla with Highest Trump in third place. In the Child Stakes at Newmarket in July, Roussalka was beaten three-quarters of a length by Saucboat, to whom she was conceding four pounds. Piggott appeared to ride a poorly-judged race on this occasion, holding up Roussalka at the back of the field and giving her too much ground to make up in the closing stages. Roussalka met Sauceboat again in the Nassau Stakes over ten furlongs at Goodwood Racecourse at the end of the month. Starting at odds of 9/4 she was restrained by Piggott until well inside the final furlong when she overtook Sauceboat and won very easily by a length. Timeform reported that Piggott on Roussalka had "played cat and mouse" with Sauceboat in the closing stages. In August, the filly ran under a four-pound weight penalty in the Waterford Crystal Mile. Racing on softer ground than she had previously encountered she finished third behind Gay Fandango and Rose Bowl.

In September, Roussalka was matched against the four-year-old Record Run, winner of the Prince of Wales's Stakes, in the Royal Palace Stakes over ten furlongs at Doncaster Racecourse. She finished second, after challenging the older horse in the straight before being eased by Piggott in the closing stages. On her final appearance of the season, she ran poorly when unplaced in the Sun Chariot Stakes at Newmarket in October.

=== 1976: four-year-old season ===
Roussalka remained in training as a four-year-old but made only three appearances. After finishing fifth on her debut she showed some promise when running fourth behind Duboff in the Child Stakes. At Goodwood in July he attempted to become the first horse to record successive victories in the Nassau Stakes. Ridden as usual by Piggott she started at odds of 15/8 against a field which included Sauceboat, to whom she was conceding three pounds. Roussalka looked beaten when she dropped to seventh place approaching the straight, but under a strong ride from Piggott, she produce a sustained run in the last quarter mile to overhaul Sauceboat in the final strides. Her feat of winning the race twice was subsequently matched by Ruby Tiger in 1991 and 1992 and superseded by Midday, who won the race three times in 2009, 2010 and 2011.

== Assessment ==
There was no International Classification of European two-year-olds in 1974: the official handicappers of Britain, Ireland and France compiled separate rankings for horses which competed in those countries. In the British Free Handicap, Roussalka was allotted a weight of 116 pounds, making her the fourth-best two-year-old filly to race in the United Kingdom behind Cry of Truth, Rose Bowl and One Over Parr. The independent Timeorm organisation gave her a rating of 116, thirteen pounds inferior to Cry of Truth and fifteen behind the French-trained filly Broadway Dancer. In 1975, Roussalka was rated 123 by Timeform, ten pounds below their top-rated three-year-old filly Rose Bowl. In the official British Handicap for three-year-old she was assigned a weight of 123 pounds, eight pounds behind the leading fillies Rose Bowl and May Hill. In 1976 she was again rated 123 by Timeform, whilst the official British Handicapper rated her fifteen pounds inferior to the leading older female Rose Bowl.

== Breeding record ==
After retiring from racing, Roussalka produced fourteen foals between 1978 and 1995. Her female-line descendants included the 1000 Guineas winner Ameerat and the middle-distance racehorse Collier Hill.

- Northern Supremo (chestnut colt, foaled in 1978, sired by Northern Dancer) failed to win in six races, disqualified after finishing first in a race at Newbury
- Lost Splendour (filly, 1979, by Vaguely Noble)
- Summer Impressions (chestnut filly, 1980, by Lyphard) failed to win in five races grand-dam of Ameerat
- Staritsa (bay filly, 1981, by Alleged)
- Borjom (chestnut colt, 1982, by Irish River)
- Gayane (bay filly, 1984, by Nureyev) won four races including the Sirenia Stakes, runner-up in the July Cup
- High Altar (bay colt, 1985, by High Line) won one race
- Rain Date (chestnut filly, 1987, by Rainbow Quest), grand-dam of Collier Hill
- Ristna (chestnut filly, 1988, by Kris) won four races including the Sun Chariot Stakes
- Irek (bay gelding, 1989, by Shareef Dancer) won two races
- Princely Gait (bay gelding, 1991, by Darshaan) won four races
- Shahid (bay colt, 1992, by Green Desert) won five races including the Beeswing Stakes
- Conspiracy (bay filly, 1994, by Rudimentary), won two races including the Listed Harry Rosebery Trophy
- Ritual Run (bay gelding, 1995, by Rudimentary) failed to win in six races

== Pedigree ==
Pedigree of Roussalka (GB), bay mare, 1972
Sire Habitat (USA) 1966	Sir Gaylord (USA); 1959	Turn-To	Royal Charger
Sire Habitat (USA) 1966	Sir Gaylord (USA); 1959	Turn-To	Source Sucree
Sire Habitat (USA) 1966	Sir Gaylord (USA); 1959	Somethingroyal	Princequillo
Sire Habitat (USA) 1966	Sir Gaylord (USA); 1959	Somethingroyal	Imperatrice
Sire Habitat (USA) 1966	Little Hut (USA); 1952	Occupy	Bull Dog
Sire Habitat (USA) 1966	Little Hut (USA); 1952	Occupy	Miss Bunting
Sire Habitat (USA) 1966	Little Hut (USA); 1952	Savage Beauty	Challenger
Sire Habitat (USA) 1966	Little Hut (USA); 1952	Savage Beauty	Khara
Dam Oh So Fair (USA) 1967	Graustark (USA); 1963	Ribot	Tenerani
Dam Oh So Fair (USA) 1967	Graustark (USA); 1963	Ribot	Romanella
Dam Oh So Fair (USA) 1967	Graustark (USA); 1963	Flower Bowl	Alibhai
Dam Oh So Fair (USA) 1967	Graustark (USA); 1963	Flower Bowl	Flower Bed
Dam Oh So Fair (USA) 1967	Chandelle (USA); 1959	Swaps	Khaled
Dam Oh So Fair (USA) 1967	Chandelle (USA); 1959	Swaps	Iron Reward
Dam Oh So Fair (USA) 1967	Chandelle (USA); 1959	Malindi	Nearco
Dam Oh So Fair (USA) 1967	Chandelle (USA); 1959	Malindi	Mumtaz Begum (Family: 9-c)
