= Homing (horse) =

British Thoroughbred racehorse

- Sire: Habitat
- Grandsire: Sir Gaylord
- Dam: Heavenly Thought
- Damsire: St. Paddy
- Sex: Stallion
- Foaled: 25 March 1975
- Country: United Kingdom
- Colour: Bay
- Breeder: Lord Rotherwick
- Owner: Lord Rotherwick
- Trainer: Dick Hern
- Record: 14:6-2-1

Major wins
- Prix du Rond Point (1978); Queen Elizabeth II Stakes (1978)

Awards
- Timeform rating 105p (1977), 130 (1978); Timeform best miler (1978)

Homing (foaled 1975) was a British Thoroughbred racehorse and sire. Although he never won at Group One race, he established himself as the leading horse in Europe over one mile in 1978. His early form was moderate, but in the autumn of his three-year-old season he made dramatic improvement to record wide margin victories in the Prix du Rond Point and the Queen Elizabeth II Stakes. He was retired from racing at the end of the season, having won six of his fourteen races, and had modest success as a breeding stallion.

== Background ==
Homing was a bay horse with a white star and a white sock on his right hind leg bred by his owner Lord Rotherwick. He was sired by Habitat, an American-bred, British-raced miler who became one of the leading European stallions of the 1970s and 1980s. His other progeny included Habibti, Marwell, Rose Bowl, Flying Water and Sigy and he was the British Champion broodmare sire on three occasions. Homing's dam, Heavenly Thought was a successful racemare who won the Princess Royal Stakes in 1970 and later produced Water Mill who won the Glorious Stakes and finished second when favourite for the 1980 St Leger. Heavenly Thought was a granddaughter of the 1000 Guineas and Oaks winner Musidora who was also the ancestor of the St Leger winner Snurge.

Homing was sent into training with Dick Hern at West Ilsley in Berkshire. He usually raced in blinkers.

== Racing career ==
=== 1977: two-year-old season ===
After finishing unplaced on his racecourse debut, he was sent to York Racecourse in October where he contested a minor race over six furlongs. He appeared to be struggling in the early stages but made rapid progress in the second half of the race and won by one and a half lengths from Fast Colour a colt who had previously won the Champion Trophy at Ripon Racecourse in August.

=== 1978: three-year-old season ===
In the early part of 1978, Homing showed unremarkable form, and was beaten in his first four races. In June, he was moved up in distance and won the Bass Clubman's Handicap at Haydock Park Racecourse from Spring To Mind, Portese and Fool's Prayer. He then dropped back in distance and won handicap races over a mile at York and Haydock. In August he was allotted top weight in the Rose of York Handicap, but finished ninth of the fifteen runners behind Petronisi.

On 3 September, Homing was moved up sharply in class for the Group Two, Prix du Rond Point over 1600 metres at Longchamp Racecourse. Ridden by the Scottish jockey Willie Carson he started a 16/1 outsider, with the four-year-old filly Sanedtki being made favourite. Homing took the lead from the start, went clear of his opponents in the straight, and won by four lengths from Sanedtki (who was carrying six pounds more than the colt) in a new course record time of 1:35.6. Three weeks later, Homing met Sanedtki again, this time at a difference of two pounds, in the Group One Prix du Moulin over the same course and distance. Homing again attempted to make all the running but was caught 100 metres from the finish and beaten two lengths by Sanedtki. There was a gap of five lengths back to the rest of the field which included Nishapour (Poule d'Essai des Poulains), Kenmare (Prix Jacques Le Marois), Carwhite (Prix d'Ispahan) and Dom Racine (Prix Jean Prat).

A week after his defeat in the Moulin, Homing returned to England for the Queen Elizabeth II Stakes (then a Group Two race) over one mile at Ascot Racecourse and started 9/2 second favourite behind the Vincent O'Brien-trained Stradavinsky. The other runners included the 1000 Guineas winner Enstone Spark, the Queen Anne Stakes winner Radetzky and the Jersey Stakes winner Camden Town. Homing started slowly but quickly took the lead and dominated the race, drawing away from his rivals in the straight to win easily by five lengths from Stradavinky, who in turn finished well clear of the rest.

== Assessment ==
In 1977, the independent Timeform organisation awarded Homing a rating of 105 p, the "p" indicating that he was expected to mage significantly more than normal improvement: in their annual Racehorses of 1977, they described him as "a very useful colt in the making". In 1978, Homing was rated 130 by Timeform, making him their best miler of the year. In the official International Classification, Homing was rated the sixth-best three-year-old colt in Europe, five pounds behind the top-rated Ile de Bourbon.

== Stud record ==
At the end of his three-year-old season, Homing was retired from racing to become a breeding stallion at the Highclere Stud in Newmarket after his owner had reportedly rejected an offer of $2m from American breeders. He began his stud career at a fee of £3,500.

He was not a particularly successful stallion, but did sire the Derby Italiano winner Don Orazio and Chapel Cottage, a sprinting filly who won the Cherry Hinton Stakes and the Duke of York Stakes.

== Pedigree ==
Pedigree of Homing, bay stallion, 1975
Sire Habitat (USA) 1966	Sir Gaylord (USA); 1959	Turn-To	Royal Charger
Sire Habitat (USA) 1966	Sir Gaylord (USA); 1959	Turn-To	Source Sucree
Sire Habitat (USA) 1966	Sir Gaylord (USA); 1959	Somethingroyal	Princequillo
Sire Habitat (USA) 1966	Sir Gaylord (USA); 1959	Somethingroyal	Imperatrice
Sire Habitat (USA) 1966	Little Hut (USA); 1952	Occupy	Bull Dog
Sire Habitat (USA) 1966	Little Hut (USA); 1952	Occupy	Miss Bunting
Sire Habitat (USA) 1966	Little Hut (USA); 1952	Savage Beauty	Challenger
Sire Habitat (USA) 1966	Little Hut (USA); 1952	Savage Beauty	Khara
Dam Heavenly Thought (GB) 1967	St. Paddy (GB); 1957	Aureole	Hyperion
Dam Heavenly Thought (GB) 1967	St. Paddy (GB); 1957	Aureole	Angelola
Dam Heavenly Thought (GB) 1967	St. Paddy (GB); 1957	Edie Kelly	Bois Roussel
Dam Heavenly Thought (GB) 1967	St. Paddy (GB); 1957	Edie Kelly	Carlissa
Dam Heavenly Thought (GB) 1967	Wishful Thinking (GB); 1960	Petition	Fair Trial
Dam Heavenly Thought (GB) 1967	Wishful Thinking (GB); 1960	Petition	Art Paper
Dam Heavenly Thought (GB) 1967	Wishful Thinking (GB); 1960	Musidora	Nasrullah
Dam Heavenly Thought (GB) 1967	Wishful Thinking (GB); 1960	Musidora	Painted Vale (Family:1-m)
