= Hittite Glory =

British-bred Thoroughbred racehorse

- Sire: Habitat
- Grandsire: Sir Gaylord
- Dam: Hazy Idea
- Damsire: Hethersett
- Sex: Stallion
- Foaled: 18 April 1973
- Country: United Kingdom
- Colour: Bay
- Breeder: Cleaboy Farms Co
- Owner: Ravi Tikkoo
- Trainer: Scobie Breasley
- Record: 13:3-0-1

Major wins
- Flying Childers Stakes (1975); Middle Park Stakes (1975)

Awards
- Timeform rating 125 (1975), 119 (1976)

Hittite Glory (18 April 1973 – 14 November 1996) was a British Thoroughbred racehorse and sire, best known for his 100/1 success in the 1975 Flying Childers Stakes. As a two-year-old, he won one of his first four races before recording his upset win in the Flying Childers and then won a second major prize when taking the Middle Park Stakes. He was rated the second best colt of his generation in Britain. In the following year he was trained in France but failed to win in six races. In all, he won three of his thirteen races between June 1975 and September 1976. He stood as a breeding stallion in Europe and Japan but has not a success.

== Background ==
Hittite Glory was a "powerful, round-bodied, muscular and most impressive looking" bay horse with no white markings bred in England by Cleaboy Farms. He was sired by Habitat, an American-bred, British-raced miler who became one of the leading European stallions of the 1970s and 1980s. His other progeny included Habibti, Flying Water, Marwell, Rose Bowl and Steinlen and he was the British Champion broodmare sire on three occasions. Hittite Glory was the second foal of his dam Hazy Idea, a high-class racemare (rated 118 by Timeform) who won the Crookham Stakes in 1969 and the March Stakes in 1970. Both Hazy Idea's sire Hethersett and dam Won't Linger second generation descendants of the broodmare Netherton Maid.

As a yearling Hittite Glory was offered for sale and bought for 30,000 guineas by the Indian shipping magnate Ravi Tikkoo. The colt was sent into training with Scobie Breasley at the South Hatch stable near Epsom.

== Racing career ==
=== 1975: two-year-old season ===
Hittite Glory made his debut in the Berkshire Stakes over six furlongs on firm ground at Newbury Racecourse in June and finished fifth, twenty lengths behind the Clive Brittain-trained African Winner. After winning a six furlong maiden race on softer ground on his next appearance, the colt was moved up in class for the Richmond Stakes and finished sixth of the nine runners behind Stand to Reason. In the Gimcrack Stakes at York Racecourse in August Hittite Glory's pretensions to high class were apparently exposed: he swerved exiting the starting stalls and never looked likely to win, finishing eleventh of the fourteen runners behind Music Boy and the somewhat unlucky Stand to Reason.

Only five runners contested the Group One Flying Childers Stakes over five furlongs at Doncaster's St Leger meeting in September. Music Boy started the 5/6 favourite ahead of the Norfolk Stakes winner Faliraki on 6/4 with the fillies Western Jewel (runner-up in the Prix Robert Papin) and Alacriter (winner of four races) on 14/1. Hittite Glory, ridden by Frankie Durr, was given no realistic chance and started the complete outsider of the quintet on 100/1. Racing on better ground than in his last two races, Hittite Glory started well but was last of the five runners behind Music Boy at half way, with Durr apparently working hard to keep pace with the others. In the final quarter mile however, the colt produced a sustained run and caught Music Boy in the closing stages to win by a neck. There was a gap of two and a half lengths back to Western Jewel, who was in turn six lengths clear of Faliraki, with Alacriter a further five lengths back in last place. The independent Timeform organisation rejected claims that the result had been a "fluke", stating their view that he had won the race on merit. Since the introduction of the Group race system in 1971, the only other horse to have won such a race at odds of 100/1 has been Sole Power in the 2010 Nunthorpe Stakes.

Hittite Glory was treated more seriously when he contested the Middle Park Stakes over six furlongs at Newmarket Racecourse in October, starting at odds of 9/2. The Vincent O'Brien-trained Folmar (winner of the Tyros Stakes) was made favourite, whilst the other contenders included Royal Boy (Mill Reef Stakes) and Duke Ellington (Harry Rosebery Trophy). Hittite Glory started poorly and was still in last place and looking unlikely to find space to run with a quarter mile to run. In a rough finish, Durr drove the colt through a narrow gap on the inside, hampering Royal Boy in the process, and was then in turn bumped by Duke Ellington. He gained the advantage in the last strides and prevailed by a short head from Duke Ellington with the outsider Patris a length away in third. Timeform stated that he would have won more decisively with a clear run. Later that month, at the same course, Hittite Glory attempted to become the first Middle Park Stakes winner since Lemberg in 1909 to follow up with a victory in the seven-furlong Dewhurst Stakes. Racing on firmer ground, he fought against Durr's attempts to restrain him in the early stages and never looked likely to win, finishing fifth of the seven runners behind Wollow.

=== 1976: three-year-old season ===
For the 1976 season Ravi Tikkoo transferred his horses to France where they were trained by Breasley at Chantilly. Hittite Glory ran six times, but failed to recover his two-year-old form. On his debut he finished seventh to The Chaplain when carrying top weight in the Prix Montenica over 1500 metres at Maisons-Laffitte Racecourse. In the Poule d'Essai des Poulains over 1600 metres at Longchamp Racecourse on 25 April he finished last of the eleven runners behind Red Lord and thereafter reverted to sprint distances. He returned to England for the King's Stand Stakes at Royal Ascot in June and produced his best performance of the season, staying on well after being outpaced in the early stages to finish third behind Lochnager and Realty. His form subsequently deteriorated: he finished last in the July Cup, ninth in the William Hill Sprint Championship in August and ninth in the Prix de Seine-et-Oise at Maisons-Laffitte on 20 September.

== Assessment ==
There was no International Classification of European two-year-olds in 1975: the official handicappers of Britain, Ireland and France compiled separate rankings for horses which competed in those countries. In the British Free Handicap, Hittite Glory was rated the second-best two-year-old of the season, five pounds behind the top-rated Wollow. The independent Timeform organisation gave him a rating of 125, two pounds behind Wollow and five behind their top-rated juvenile Manado. In their annual Racehorses of 1975, Timeform described him as looking "every inch a high-class sprinter" and noting that he had a clear preference for good ground. In the following year he was rated 119 by Timeform, who commented in their annual Racehorses of 1976 that the colts moderate performances had left him with a "badly tarnished reputation" but said that "on his day he was a very good horse".

== Stud record ==
Hittite Glory was retired from racing at the end of his three-year-old season and was syndicated for £4,000 a share, giving him a theoretical value of £160,000. He began his career as a breeding stallion at the New England Stud in Newmarket at a fee of £1,200. He made little impact as a sire of winners and was exported to Japan in 1983. His last recorded foal was born in 1993 and died on 14 November 1996. The best of his offspring was probably Past Glories, who finished third in the Champion Hurdle and became a successful National Hunt sire.

== Pedigree ==
Pedigree of Hittite Glory (GB), bay stallion, 1973
Sire Habitat (USA) 1966	Sir Gaylord (USA); 1959	Turn-To	Royal Charger
Sire Habitat (USA) 1966	Sir Gaylord (USA); 1959	Turn-To	Source Sucree
Sire Habitat (USA) 1966	Sir Gaylord (USA); 1959	Somethingroyal	Princequillo
Sire Habitat (USA) 1966	Sir Gaylord (USA); 1959	Somethingroyal	Imperatrice
Sire Habitat (USA) 1966	Little Hut (USA); 1952	Occupy	Bull Dog
Sire Habitat (USA) 1966	Little Hut (USA); 1952	Occupy	Miss Bunting
Sire Habitat (USA) 1966	Little Hut (USA); 1952	Savage Beauty	Challenger
Sire Habitat (USA) 1966	Little Hut (USA); 1952	Savage Beauty	Khara
Dam Hazy Idea (GB) 1967	Hethersett (GB); 1959	Hugh Lupus	Djebel
Dam Hazy Idea (GB) 1967	Hethersett (GB); 1959	Hugh Lupus	Sakountala
Dam Hazy Idea (GB) 1967	Hethersett (GB); 1959	Bride Elect	Big Game
Dam Hazy Idea (GB) 1967	Hethersett (GB); 1959	Bride Elect	Netherton Maid
Dam Hazy Idea (GB) 1967	Won't Linger (GB); 1961	Worden	Wild Risk
Dam Hazy Idea (GB) 1967	Won't Linger (GB); 1961	Worden	Sans Tares
Dam Hazy Idea (GB) 1967	Won't Linger (GB); 1961	Cherished	Chanteur
Dam Hazy Idea (GB) 1967	Won't Linger (GB); 1961	Cherished	Netherton Maid (Family:21-a)

- Hittite Glory was inbred 4 x 4 to Netherton Maid, meaning that this mare appears twice in the fourth generation of his pedigree.
