= Bassenthwaite (horse) =

British-bred Thoroughbred racehorse

- Sire: Habitat
- Grandsire: Sir Gaylord
- Dam: Splashing
- Damsire: Petingo
- Sex: Stallion
- Foaled: 21 May 1982
- Country: United Kingdom
- Colour: Bay
- Breeder: Dare & Wigan
- Owner: Stavros Niarchos
- Trainer: Jeremy Tree
- Record: 11: 4-2-1

Major wins
- Middle Park Stakes (1984)

Awards
- Timeform rating 126 (1984), 119 (1985)

Bassenthwaite (21 May 1982 – 1998) was a British Thoroughbred racehorse and sire. After fetching 320,000 guineas as a yearling he was sent into training with Jeremy Tree and proved to be one of the best British two-year-olds of 1984. He won three minor races and was placed in the Gimcrack Stakes and the Mill Reef Stakes before ending the year by recording his biggest win in the Middle Park Stakes. He finished second in the Greenham Stakes on his three-year-old debut but was well-beaten in three subsequent races and was retired from racing. He later stood as a breeding stallion in New Zealand where he had limited success as a sire of winners.

== Background ==
Bassenthwaite was a "medium-sized, well-made, most attractive" bay horse with no white markings bred in England by Dare & Wigan. He was from the twelfth crop of foals sired by Habitat, an American-bred, British-raced miler who became one of the leading European stallions of the 1970s and 1980s. His other progeny included Habibti, Flying Water, Marwell, Rose Bowl and Steinlen He was also the British Champion broodmare sire on three occasions. Bassenthwaite's dam Splashing was a successful racemare who won the Cornwallis Stakes in 1973. Her dam Pelting was the ancestor of several other winners including Moon Ballad, Braashee (Prix Royal-Oak) and Central Park (Italian Derby).

As a foal, Bassenthwaite was offered for sale and sold for 85,000 guineas. In the following year be was put up for auction at the Highflyer Sale and was bought for 320,000 guineas by representatives of Stavros Niarchos. The colt was sent into training with Jeremy Tree at Beckhampton in Wiltshire. The colt was named after Bassenthwaite Lake.

== Racing career ==
=== 1984: two-year-old season ===
Bassenthwaite made his racecourse debut in a minor race over five furlongs at Newbury Racecourse in May in which he finished fourth behind his stable companion Pennine Walk (later to win the (Queen Anne Stakes). He recorded his first victory in June, over the same course and distance as he won by six lengths from Lucky Ring in the Berkshire Stakes. At Sandown Park Racecourse in July he started odds on favourite and won by two lengths from Caribbean Song. Seven days later he took his third consecutive race in the Black Duck Stakes at York Racecourse beating the Coventry Stakes runner-up Star Video (his only rival) by a length and a half. In August he was moved up in class for the Group Two Gimcrack Stakes over six furlongs at York and finished second by a neck to Doulab, finishing strongly after looking outpaced approaching the final furlong. In the Mill Reef Stakes at Newbury he briefly took the lead a furlong from the finish but was overtaken in the closing stages and finished third behind Local Suitor and Presidium.

On his final race of the season Bassenthawaite started at odds of 7/2 for the Group One Middle Park Stakes over six furlongs at Newmarket Racecourse. Jeremy Tree had been unwilling to take on Local Suitor again but when the Mill Reef Stakes winner was rerouted to the Dewhurst Stakes he decided to let his colt take his chance. Doulab was again in opposition and the best of his other six rivals appeared to be Primo Dominie (winner of the Coventry Stakes, July Stakes and Richmond Stakes) and Sharp Romance (runner-up in the Champagne Stakes. Ridden by Pat Eddery, Bassenthwaite was tucked away on the rail as Sea Falcon set the pace in the early stages. He moved into third place behind Sea Falcon and Doulab approaching the last quarter mile, took the lead a furlong out and accelerated away in the closing stages to win by four lengths from Doulab.

=== 1985: three-year-old season ===
On his first appearance as a three-year-old Bassenthwaite contested the Greenham Stakes (a major trial race for the 2000 Guineas) over seven furlongs at Newbury in April and finished second to the odds-on favourite Bairn. He was then moved up in distance for the 2000 Guineas over the Rowley Mile at Newmarket on 4 May. He started third favourite but appeared not to stay the distance as he finished fifth, seven lengths behind Shadeed. Later that month he was equipped with blinkers when was dropped in class for the Leisure Stakes over seven furlongs at Lingfield Park and finished fourth behind the four-year-old Alpine Strings. At Royal Ascot in 21 June he returned to sprint distances for the King's Stand Stakes but looked to be somewhat outpaced and finished eighth of the fifteen runners behind Never So Bold.

== Assessment ==
In the official International Classification for 1984 Bassenthwaite was rated the sixth-best two-year-old in Europe behind Kala Dancer, Law Society, Gold Crest, Local Suitor and Triptych. The independent Timeform organisation gave him a rating of 126, three pounds behind Kala Dancer, who was their top-rated juvenile. In their annual Racehorses of 1984, Timeform described him being likely to become a high-class sprinter, but expressed doubts about his ability to stay beyond six furlongs. In the following year he was rated 119 by Timeform, seventeen pounds behind their Horse of the Year Slip Anchor.

== Stud record ==
At the end of his racing career Bassenthwaite was exported to become a breeding stallion in New Zealand. The most successful of his offspring was probably Balmacara, a mare who won eight races including the Grade 2 New Zealand Thoroughbred Breeders Stakes. Bassenthwaite died in June 1998.

== Pedigree ==
Pedigree of Bassenthwaite (GB), bay stallion, 1982
Sire Habitat (USA) 1966	Sir Gaylord (USA); 1959	Turn-To	Royal Charger
Sire Habitat (USA) 1966	Sir Gaylord (USA); 1959	Turn-To	Source Sucree
Sire Habitat (USA) 1966	Sir Gaylord (USA); 1959	Somethingroyal	Princequillo
Sire Habitat (USA) 1966	Sir Gaylord (USA); 1959	Somethingroyal	Imperatrice
Sire Habitat (USA) 1966	Little Hut (USA); 1952	Occupy	Bull Dog
Sire Habitat (USA) 1966	Little Hut (USA); 1952	Occupy	Miss Bunting
Sire Habitat (USA) 1966	Little Hut (USA); 1952	Savage Beauty	Challenger
Sire Habitat (USA) 1966	Little Hut (USA); 1952	Savage Beauty	Khara
Dam Splashing (GB) 1971	Petingo (GB); 1965	Petition	Fair Trial
Dam Splashing (GB) 1971	Petingo (GB); 1965	Petition	Art Paper
Dam Splashing (GB) 1971	Petingo (GB); 1965	Alcazar	Alycidon
Dam Splashing (GB) 1971	Petingo (GB); 1965	Alcazar	Quarterdeck
Dam Splashing (GB) 1971	Pelting (GB); 1958	Vilmorin	Gold Bridge
Dam Splashing (GB) 1971	Pelting (GB); 1958	Vilmorin	Queen of the Meadows
Dam Splashing (GB) 1971	Pelting (GB); 1958	Firmament	Windsor Lad
Dam Splashing (GB) 1971	Pelting (GB); 1958	Firmament	Guiding Star (Family:4-k)
