= Sigy (horse) =

French-bred Thoroughbred racehorse

- Sire: Habitat
- Grandsire: Sir Gaylord
- Dam: Satu
- Damsire: Primera
- Sex: Mare
- Foaled: 9 March 1976
- Country: France
- Colour: Bay
- Breeder: Roland de Chambure
- Owner: Ghislaine Head
- Trainer: Criquette Head
- Record: 11: 5-0-3

Major wins
- Prix d'Arenberg (1978); Prix de l'Abbaye (1978); Prix du Gros Chêne (1979)

Awards
- Timeform rating 132 (1978), 119 (1979)

Honours
- Top-rated European two-year-old filly (1979); Top-rated French-trained two-year-old (1979); Timeform top-rated two-year-old filly (1979)

Sigy (foaled 9 March 1976) was a French Thoroughbred racehorse and broodmare. She was best known for her exploits as a two-year-old in 1978, when she won her last three races culminating with a win over colts and older horses in the Prix de l'Abbaye. At the end of the season she was rated the best racehorse of her age and sex in Europe. Her three-year-old career was disappointing, although she did win the Prix du Gros Chêne. She later had some success as a broodmare.

== Background ==
Sigy was a big, powerfully-built bay mare, bred in France by Roland de Chambure. She was sired by Habitat, an American-bred, British-raced miler who became one of the leading European stallions of the 1970s and 1980s. His other progeny included Habibti, Marwell, Rose Bowl, Flying Water and Steinlen and he was the British Champion broodmare sire on three occasions. Her dam, Satu was a successful racehorse who won the Prix Fille de l'Air in 1968. She was broodmare owned by the Cliveden Stud in England when she was covered by Habitat in 1975 but was sold, with Sigy in utero for 10,500 guineas at Newmarket in December 1975. Sigy's racing career was guided by the Head family: she was owned by Ghislaine, trained by Criquette and ridden in most of her races by Freddy.

== Racing career ==
=== 1978: two-year-old season ===
On her racecourse debut, Sigy finished third behind Promise of Joy over 1000 metres and then won a maiden race over the same distance at Maisons-Laffitte Racecourse. When moved up in class for the Group One Prix Robert Papin over 1100 m on 30 July she finished fifth behind Pitasia, Promise of Joy, Some Guy and Irish River. In August, Sigy ran in the Prix de la Vallee d'Auge over 1000 m at Deauville Racecourse and showed improved form to win by four lengths. The winning time of 56.80 seconds beat the previous course record, set by Nonoalco in 1973, by half a second. In early September, Sigy met Promise of Joy for the third time in the Group Three Prix d'Arenberg at Chantilly Racecourse. She decisively reversed the previous form, leading from the start and winning by four lengths. On 1 October, Sigy was moved into weight-for-age competition for France's most prestigious sprint race, the Prix de l'Abbaye at Longchamp Racecourse. She started second favourite at odds of 19/10, with the betting being headed by the Irish-trained three-year-old Solinus, the winner of the King's Stand Stakes, the July Cup and the William Hill Sprint Championship. As in her two previous races, Sigy led from the start, established a clear lead and was never seriously challenged, winning easily by three lengths from Solinus. Timeform described the performance as the best by a two-year-old over the distance since Deep Diver won the same race in 1971.

=== 1979: three-year-old season ===
On her three-year-old debut, Sigy started the 1/5 favourite for the Prix de Saint-Georges at Longchamp on 6 May but finished third, beaten seven lengths by the five-year-old King of Macedon. On 19 June she showed signs of a return to form in the Prix du Gros-Chene at Chantilly, leading from the start and winning by two and a half lengths from Lanngar. The filly was then sent overseas for the first time and moved up in distance for the six furlong July Cup at Newmarket Racecourse, but looked unimpressive before the race and finished last of the eleven runners behind Thatching. On 7 October at Longchamp, Sigy attempted to repeat her success of 1978 in the Prix de l'Abbaye. She started the 6/1 fourth-choice in the betting but finished last of the thirteen runner field behind the British-trained four-year-old Double Form. Two weeks later, over the same course and distance, Sigy appeared for the final time in the Prix du Petit Couvert and started the 6/4 favourite. She led until the last 200 m but faded to finish fifth behind the two-year-old Manjam.

== Assessment and honours ==
In the inaugural International Classification, a collaboration between the official handicappers of France, Ireland and the United Kingdom, Sigy was rated the best two-year-old filly in Europe two pounds behind the leading colt Tromos and level with the leading French colt Irish River. The independent Timeform organisation rated her the best two-year-old filly of the season with a rating of 132. During the 1970s the only two-year-old fillies to be more highly rated by the organisation were Jacinth (133 in 1972) and Rose Bowl (133 in 1974). In the following year she was rated 119 by Timeform, while the International Classification rated her sixteen pounds inferior to the top-rated Three Troikas and eleven below the top sprinter Thatching.

== Stud record ==
Sigy produced at least eight foals, three of whom won important races.

- Sicyos (chestnut colt, foaled 1981, sired by Lyphard), won Prix d'Arenberg, Prix de Saint-Georges
- J. O.'s Optifast (brown colt, foaled 1982 sired by J. O. Tobin)
- Petite Soeur (brown filly, foaled 1984, sired by Lyphard)
- Radjhasi (chestnut colt, foaled 1985, sired by Raja Baba), won Prix Eclipse
- Company (chestnut filly, foaled 1987, sired by Nureyev)
- King's Signet (chestnut colt, foaled 1989, sired by Nureyev), won Stewards' Cup
- Zary (bay filly, foaled 1991, sired by Danzig), won one race
- Sakieh (bay filly, foaled 1994, sired by Green Desert)

== Pedigree ==
Pedigree of Sigy (FR), bay mare, 1976
Sire Habitat (USA) 1966	Sir Gaylord (USA); 1959	Turn-To	Royal Charger
Sire Habitat (USA) 1966	Sir Gaylord (USA); 1959	Turn-To	Source Sucree
Sire Habitat (USA) 1966	Sir Gaylord (USA); 1959	Somethingroyal	Princequillo
Sire Habitat (USA) 1966	Sir Gaylord (USA); 1959	Somethingroyal	Imperatrice
Sire Habitat (USA) 1966	Little Hut (USA); 1952	Occupy	Bull Dog
Sire Habitat (USA) 1966	Little Hut (USA); 1952	Occupy	Miss Bunting
Sire Habitat (USA) 1966	Little Hut (USA); 1952	Savage Beauty	Challenger
Sire Habitat (USA) 1966	Little Hut (USA); 1952	Savage Beauty	Khara
Dam Satu (GB) 1965	Primera (GB); 1954	My Babu	Djebel
Dam Satu (GB) 1965	Primera (GB); 1954	My Babu	Perfume
Dam Satu (GB) 1965	Primera (GB); 1954	Pirette	Deiri
Dam Satu (GB) 1965	Primera (GB); 1954	Pirette	Pimpette
Dam Satu (GB) 1965	Creation (GB); 1960	Crepello	Donatello
Dam Satu (GB) 1965	Creation (GB); 1960	Crepello	Crepuscule
Dam Satu (GB) 1965	Creation (GB); 1960	Cyclorama	Panorama
Dam Satu (GB) 1965	Creation (GB); 1960	Cyclorama	Gadabout (Family:14-c)
