= Hail To Reason =

American-bred Thoroughbred racehorse

Hail to Reason
- Breed: Thoroughbred
- Sire: Turn-to
- Grandsire: Royal Charger
- Dam: Nothirdchance
- Damsire: Blue Swords
- Sex: Stallion
- Foaled: April 18, 1958
- Died: February 24, 1976 (aged 17)
- Country: United States
- Colour: Brown
- Breeder: Bieber-Jacobs Stable
- Owner: Hirsch Jacobs; Harbor View Farm
- Trainer: Hirsch Jacobs
- Record: 18: 9–2–2
- Earnings: $328,434

Major wins
- Youthful Stakes (1960); Tremont Stakes (1960); Sanford Stakes (1960); Great American Stakes (1960); World's Playground Stakes (1960); Sapling Stakes (1960); Hopeful Stakes (1960)

Awards
- American Champion Two-Year-Old Colt (1960); Leading sire in North America (1970)

Hail to Reason (April 18, 1958 – February 24, 1976) was an American Thoroughbred racehorse and an influential sire. In a racing career cut short by injury, he was named the American Champion Two-Year-Old Colt of 1960 after winning seven stakes races including the Hopeful Stakes. He later became a leading sire whose offspring included 1972 Epsom Derby winner Roberto and leading sire Halo, who in turn sired 1989 Kentucky Derby and Preakness Stakes winner Sunday Silence.

== Background ==
Hail to Reason was bred in Kentucky by the Bieber-Jacobs Stable, a partnership of prominent horsemen, Isadore Bieber and Hirsch Jacobs. He was sired by the English stakes winner Turn-To, a grandson of the very influential sire Nearco. Hail to Reason was out of the mare Nothirdchance, a stakes winning daughter of Blue Swords. She was named by Jacobs as a warning to the Allies to not allow Germany to start another war. Hail to Reason was named in response to his fulfilled hopes.

== Racing career ==
Starting in January 1958, Hail to Reason raced 18 times as a two-year-old in nine months, winning nine times. He set a track record of :58 1/5 for 5 furlongs in his debut at Aqueduct, followed up by wins in the Youthful, Great American and Tremont at the same track. He also won the Sapling Stakes at Monmouth, the World's Playground Stakes at Atlantic City and the Sanford Stakes at Saratoga. The highlight of his campaign was winning the prestigious Hopeful Stakes at Saratoga while setting a new track record of 1:16 for 6 1/2 furlongs.

During a morning workout on September 18, he lost a shoe and broke both sesamoid bones in his left front leg, ending his career. However, he was still named 1960 American Champion Two-Year-Old Colt.

== Stud record ==
Retired to stud at Hagyard Farm near Lexington, Kentucky, Hail to Reason earned Leading sire in North America honors for 1970. Known as a source of soundness, bone and stamina among his progeny, Hail to Reason sired 218 winners (68.3%) and 43 stakes winners (13.5%) from 319 named foals. Hail to Reason is a Classic chef-de-race in the Roman-Miller dosage system. His progeny includes:

Foaled	Name	Sex	Major Wins/Achievements
1962	Hail To All	Stallion	Belmont Stakes
1964	Proud Clarion	Stallion	Kentucky Derby
1967	Personality	Stallion	Preakness Stakes, American Champion Three-Year-Old Male Horse, American Horse of the Year
1968	Bold Reason	Stallion	Travers Stakes, Leading broodmare sire in Great Britain and Ireland
1969	Halo	Stallion	Leading sire in North America
1969	Roberto	Stallion	Epsom Derby
1970	Stop The Music	Stallion	Champagne Stakes
1974	Cum Laude Laurie	Mare	Multiple Grade 1 winner
1974	Trillion	Mare	American Champion Female Turf Horse

Hail to Reason was also a broodmare sire whose daughters have produced more than 100 stakes winners, including Allez France and Triptych. Another daughter, Reason to Earn, is the dam of Bold Reasoning, sire of 1977 U.S. Triple Crown Champion Seattle Slew.

At 18, Hail to Reason was humanely put down on February 24, 1976, and is buried at Hagyard Farm.

== Pedigree ==
Pedigree of Hail to Reason, brown horse, foaled April 18, 1958
Sire Turn-To	Royal Charger	Nearco (ITY)	Pharos (GB)
Sire Turn-To	Royal Charger	Nearco (ITY)	Nogara (ITY)
Sire Turn-To	Royal Charger	Sun Princess (GB)	Solario (GB)
Sire Turn-To	Royal Charger	Sun Princess (GB)	Mumtaz Begum (FR)
Sire Turn-To	Source Sucree	Admiral Drake (FR)	Craig an Eran (GB)
Sire Turn-To	Source Sucree	Admiral Drake (FR)	Plucky Liege (GB)
Sire Turn-To	Source Sucree	Lavendula (FR)	Pharos (GB)
Sire Turn-To	Source Sucree	Lavendula (FR)	Sweet Lavender (GB)
Dam Nothirdchance	Blue Swords	Blue Larkspur	Black Servant
Dam Nothirdchance	Blue Swords	Blue Larkspur	Blossom Time
Dam Nothirdchance	Blue Swords	Flaming Swords	Man o' War
Dam Nothirdchance	Blue Swords	Flaming Swords	Exalted
Dam Nothirdchance	Galla Colors	Sir Gallahad III (FR)	Teddy
Dam Nothirdchance	Galla Colors	Sir Gallahad III (FR)	Plucky Liege (GB)
Dam Nothirdchance	Galla Colors	Rouge Et Noir	St. Germans
Dam Nothirdchance	Galla Colors	Rouge Et Noir	Baton Rouge (family 4-n)
