= Habitat (horse) =

American-bred Thoroughbred racehorse and sire (1966–1987)

- Sire: Sir Gaylord
- Grandsire: Turn-To
- Dam: Little Hut
- Damsire: Occupy
- Sex: Stallion
- Foaled: 4 May 1966
- Country: United States
- Colour: Bay
- Owner: Charles W. Engelhard, Jr.
- Trainer: Fulke Johnson Houghton
- Record: 8: 5-2-0

Major wins
- Lockinge Stakes (1969); Prix Quincey (1969); Wills Mile (1969); Prix du Moulin (1969)

Awards
- Timeform Top-rated horse (1969); Leading broodmare sire in Great Britain & Ireland (1987, 1994, 1996); Timeform rating: 134
- Last updated on 25 May 2023

Habitat (4 May 1966 – 23 June 1987) was an American-bred, British-trained Thoroughbred racehorse and sire. In a racing career which lasted from April until October 1969, the colt ran eight times and won five races. Unraced as a two-year-old, he proved to be the best European miler of 1969, winning the Lockinge Stakes and the Wills Mile in England and travelling to France to win the Prix Quincey and the Prix du Moulin. He was then retired to stud where he became a very successful sire of racehorses and broodmares.

== Background ==
Habitat was a bay horse standing 16.1 hands high bred in Kentucky by Nuckols Bros. He was sired by Sir Gaylord, a half brother to Secretariat and a successful racehorse and sire in his own right: at the time of Habitat's racing career, he was at the height of his reputation as a breeding stallion, having sired the 1968 Epsom Derby winner Sir Ivor. Habitat's dam, Little Hut, won five races and produced several other winners including Northfields (by Northern Dancer) who won the Louisiana Derby and became a successful sire in Europe and South Africa.

As a yearling, Habitat was sent to the Keeneland Sales where he was bought for $105,000 by the American businessman Charles Engelhard. The colt was sent to England to be trained by Fulke Johnson Houghton at Blewbury in Berkshire.

== Racing career ==
Habitat was slow to mature and did not appear as a two-year-old in 1968. In April 1969 he made his debut in the Royal Stakes, a trial race for The Derby at Sandown Park and finished unplaced. He next finished second in a minor race at Windsor Racecourse and then recorded his first win when taking the Willows Plate at Haydock Park by five lengths in May. Later that month, Habitat was moved up in class and matched against older horses in the Lockinge Stakes over one mile at Newbury Racecourse. Ridden by the Australian jockey Ron Hutchinson, he started at odds of 10/1 and won by one and a half lengths from a strong field which included, Jimmy Reppin (Sussex Stakes), Tower Walk (Nunthorpe Stakes), Lorenzaccio and Wolver Hollow (Eclipse Stakes).

In June at Royal Ascot, Habitat was matched against the 2000 Guineas winner Right Tack in the St. James's Palace Stakes. Ridden by Lester Piggott, he was beaten half a length by the classic winner in a rough and unsatisfactory race which resulted in Piggott receiving a seven-day suspension from riding. In August Habitat was sent to France for the Prix Quincey over 1600 metres at Deauville Racecourse and won from the Cheveley Park Stakes winner Mige. Less than a week later he returned to England to contest the Wills Mile at Goodwood Racecourse. Ridden again by Piggott, he won at odds of 9/2 from Lucyrowe (Coronation Stakes) and Jimmy Reppin. On his final start, Habitat returned to France for the Prix du Moulin at Longchamp Racecourse on 5 October. He won by two lengths from Boysie Boy, with Right Tack and Welsh Pageant (Queen Anne Stakes) among the unplaced runners.

At the end of the year, Habitat was sold to a syndicate of breeders for £400,000 and retired to stud.

== Assessment and honours ==
In 1969 Habitat was awarded a rating of 134 by the independent Timeform organisation, making him their highest-rated horse of the season, 1 lb. ahead of their Horse of the Year Prix de l'Arc de Triomphe winner Levmoss.

== Stud record ==
Habitat stood as a stallion at the Grangewilliam Stud in County Kildare Ireland and was an immediate success. His Group One winners included Bassenthwaite, Brocade, Distant Relative, Flying Water, Habat, Habibti, Hittite Glory, Marwell, Rose Bowl, Sigy, Steinlen, Double Form, Smokey Lady and Steel Heart.

Habitat was also a highly successful sire of broodmares, being the damsire of Reference Point, Shaamit, Barathea, Grand Lodge and Las Meninas. He was the Leading broodmare sire in Great Britain & Ireland in 1987, 1994 and 1996. Bloodstock expert Tony Morris believes Habitat to be "one of the most influential stallions of the last 50 years".

Despite his success as a sire of fillies, few of his sons made any impact at stud.

Habitat was euthanised at Grangewilliam on 23 June 1987.

== Pedigree ==
Pedigree of Habitat (USA), bay stallion 1966
Sire Sir Gaylord	Turn-To	Royal Charger	Nearco
Sire Sir Gaylord	Turn-To	Royal Charger	Sun Princess
Sire Sir Gaylord	Turn-To	Source Sucree	Admiral Drake
Sire Sir Gaylord	Turn-To	Source Sucree	Lavendula
Sire Sir Gaylord	Somethingroyal	Princequillo	Prince Rose
Sire Sir Gaylord	Somethingroyal	Princequillo	Cosquilla
Sire Sir Gaylord	Somethingroyal	Imperatrice	Caruso
Sire Sir Gaylord	Somethingroyal	Imperatrice	Cinqpace
Dam Little Hut	Occupy	Bull Dog	Teddy
Dam Little Hut	Occupy	Bull Dog	Plucky Liege
Dam Little Hut	Occupy	Miss Bunting	Bunting
Dam Little Hut	Occupy	Miss Bunting	Mirthful
Dam Little Hut	Savage Beauty	Challenger	Swynford
Dam Little Hut	Savage Beauty	Challenger	Sword Play
Dam Little Hut	Savage Beauty	Khara	Kai-Sang
Dam Little Hut	Savage Beauty	Khara	Decree (Family: 4-r)
