= Norfolk Stakes =

Norfolk Stakes may refer to:

- Norfolk Stakes (Great Britain), a horse race held at Ascot Racecourse.
- Norfolk Stakes, a horse race held at Santa Anita Park and now known as the American Pharoah Stakes.
- Norfolk Stakes, the original title of the Flying Childers Stakes.
