= Queen Elizabeth II Stakes =

Flat horse race in Britain

Queen Elizabeth II Stakes (British Champions Mile)
- Class: Group 1
- Location: Ascot Racecourse; Ascot, England
- Inaugurated: 1955
- Race type: Flat / Thoroughbred
- Sponsor: QIPCO
- Website: Ascot

Race information
- Distance: 1 mile (1,609 metres)
- Surface: Turf
- Track: Straight
- Qualification: Three-years-old and up
- Weight: 9 st 3 lb (3yo); 9 st 6 lb (4yo+); Allowances; 3 lb for fillies and mares
- Purse: £1,156,250 (2025); 1st: £655,709

Queen Elizabeth II Stakes
2026
Talk Of New York	Ten Bob Tony	Rayif

Previous years
2025
Cicero's Gift	The Lion In Winter	Alakazi
2024
Charyn	Facteur Cheval	Tamfana
2023
Big Rock	Facteur Cheval	Tahiyra
2022
Bayside Boy	Modern Games	Jadoomi
2021
Baaeed	Palace Pier	Lady Bowthorpe

2020-2011
2020
The Revenant	Roseman	Palace Pier
2019
King Of Change	The Revenant	Safe Voyage
2018
Roaring Lion	I Can Fly	Century Dream
2017
Persuasive	Ribchester	Churchill
2016
Minding	Ribchester	Lightning Spear
2015
Solow	Belardo	Gabrial
2014
Charm Spirit	Night Of Thunder	Toormore
2013
Olympic Glory	Top Notch Tonto	Kingsbarns
2012
Excelebration	Cityscape	Elusive Kate
2011
Frankel	Excelebration	Immortal Verse

2010–2001
2010
Poet's Voice	Rip Van Winkle	Red Jazz
2009
Rip Van Winkle	Zacinto	Delegator
2008
Raven's Pass	Henrythenavigator	Sabana Perdida
2007
Ramonti	Excellent Art	Duke Of Marmalade
2006
George Washington	Araafa	Court Masterpiece
2005
Starcraft	Dubawi	Blatant
2004
Rakti	Lucky Story	Refuse To Bend
2003
Falbrav	Russian Rhythm	Tillerman
2002
Where Or When	Hawk Wing	Tillerman
2001
Summoner	Noverre	Hawkeye

2000–1991
2000
Observatory	Giant's Causeway	Best of The Bests
1999
Dubai Millennium	Almushtarak	Gold Academy
1998
Desert Prince	Dr Fong	Second Empire
1997
Air Express	Rebecca Sharp	Faithful Son
1996
Mark of Esteem	Bosra Sham	First Island
1995
Bahri	Ridgewood Pearl	Soviet Line
1994
Maroof	Barathea	Bigstone
1993
Bigstone	Barathea	Kingmambo
1992
Lahib	Brief Truce	Selkirk
1991
Selkirk	Kooyonga	Shadayid

1990–1982
1990
Markofdistinction	Distant Relative	Green Line Express
1989
Zilzal	Polish Precedent	Distant Relative
1988
Warning	Salse	Persian Heights
1987
Milligram	Miesque	Sonic Lady
1986
Sure Blade	Teleprompter	Efisio
1985
Shadeed	Teleprompter	Zaizafon
1984
Teleprompter	Katies	Sackford
1983
Sackford	Adonijah	Montekin
1982
Buzzards Bay	Noalcoholic	Achieved

The Queen Elizabeth II Stakes is a Group 1 flat horse race in Great Britain open to horses aged three years or older. It is run at Ascot over a distance of 1 mile (1,609 metres), and it is scheduled to take place as part of British Champions Day each year in October.

== History ==
The event was established in 1955, and it was originally held in September. It was created when a race called the Knights' Royal Stakes was renamed in honour of Queen Elizabeth II. The first three winners were all trained in France.

The present system of race grading was introduced in 1971, and the "QEII" was initially given Group 2 status. It was promoted to Group 1 level in 1987.

The race was added to the Breeders' Cup Challenge series in 2008. From this point the winner earned an automatic invitation to compete in the Breeders' Cup Mile. It was removed from the series in 2012.

The Queen Elizabeth II Stakes was switched to October in 2011. It became part of a new fixture called British Champions Day, and its prize fund was increased fourfold to £1,000,000. It served as the mile-category final of the British Champions Series from 2011 to 2024.

== Records ==
Most successful horse (2 wins):

- Brigadier Gerard – 1971, 1972
- Rose Bowl – 1975, 1976

Leading jockey (8 wins):

- Willie Carson – Rose Bowl (1975, 1976), Trusted (1977), Homing (1978), Known Fact (1980), Teleprompter (1984), Lahib (1992), Bahri (1995)

Leading trainer (5 wins):

- Saeed bin Suroor – Mark of Esteem (1996), Dubai Millennium (1999), Summoner (2001), Ramonti (2007), Poet's Voice (2010)

Leading owner (6 wins):

- Godolphin – Mark of Esteem (1996), Dubai Millennium (1999), Summoner (2001), Ramonti (2007), Poet's Voice (2010), Talk Of New York (2026)

== Winners since 1955 ==
Year	Winner	Age	Jockey	Trainer	Owner	Time
1955	Hafiz II	3	Roger Poincelet	Alec Head	Aga Khan III	1:48.39
1956	Cigalon	3	Serge Boullenger	Maurice d'Okhuysen	Comte L de Kerouara	1:49.82
1957	Midget II	4	Scobie Breasley	Alec Head	Pierre Wertheimer	1:47.52
1958	Major Portion	3	Eph Smith	Ted Leader	Jim Joel	1:48.76
1959	Rosalba	3	Joe Mercer	Jack Colling	John Astor	1:41.39
1960 (Note: The 1960 and 1963 runnings were held at Newbury)	Sovereign Path	4	Harry Carr	R Mason	R Mason	1:44.20
1961	Le Levanstell	4	Bill Williamson	Seamus McGrath	J McGrath	1:42.73
1962	Romulus	3	Wally Swinburn	Fulke Johnson Houghton	Charles Engelhard	1:49.15
1963	Creditor	3	Lester Piggott	Noel Murless	Lady Sassoon	1:42.80
1964	Linacre	4	Lester Piggott	Paddy Prendergast	F More O'Ferrall	1:47.15
1965	Derring-Do	4	Scobie Breasley	Arthur Budgett	Mrs H H Renshaw	1:53.17
1966	Hill Rise	5	Lester Piggott	Noel Murless	G A Pope jnr.	1:42.51
1967	Reform	3	Scobie Breasley	Sir Gordon Richards	Sir Michael Sobell	1:47.03
1968	World Cup	3	Bill Williamson	Paddy Prendergast	J R Mullion	1:51.06
1969	Jimmy Reppin	4	Geoff Lewis	John Sutcliffe	Mrs Sidney Bates	1:41.75
1970	Welsh Pageant	4	Sandy Barclay	Noel Murless	Jim Joel	1:42.08
1971	Brigadier Gerard	3	Joe Mercer	Dick Hern	Jean Hislop	1:41.39
1972	Brigadier Gerard	4	Joe Mercer	Dick Hern	Jean Hislop	1:39.96
1973	Jan Ekels	4	Jimmy Lindley	Guy Harwood	Anthony Bodie	1:47.20
1974	Abandoned due to waterlogging					
1975	Rose Bowl	3	Willie Carson	Fulke Johnson Houghton	Jane Engelhard	1:48.97
1976	Rose Bowl	4	Willie Carson	Fulke Johnson Houghton	Jane Engelhard	1:43.49
1977	Trusted	4	Willie Carson	John Dunlop	Duchess of Norfolk	1:41.40
1978	Homing	3	Willie Carson	Dick Hern	2nd Baron Rotherwick	1:40.39
1979	Kris	3	Joe Mercer	Henry Cecil	Lord Howard de Walden	1:40.69
1980	Known Fact	3	Willie Carson	Jeremy Tree	Khalid Abdullah	1:40.02
1981	To-Agori-Mou	3	Lester Piggott	Guy Harwood	Andry Muinos	1:46.76
1982	Buzzards Bay	4	Walter Swinburn	Hugh Collingridge	Vera McKinney	1:44.98
1983	Sackford	3	Greville Starkey	Guy Harwood	Anthony Bodie	1:39.90
1984	Teleprompter	4	Willie Carson	Bill Watts	18th Earl of Derby	1:42.96
1985	Shadeed	3	Walter Swinburn	Michael Stoute	Maktoum Al Maktoum	1:38.80
1986	Sure Blade	3	Brent Thomson	Barry Hills	Sheikh Mohammed	1:41.71
1987	Milligram	3	Pat Eddery	Michael Stoute	Helena Springfield Ltd	1:40.04
1988	Warning	3	Pat Eddery	Guy Harwood	Khalid Abdullah	1:40.51
1989	Zilzal	3	Walter Swinburn	Michael Stoute	Mana Al Maktoum	1:40.57
1990	Markofdistinction	4	Frankie Dettori	Luca Cumani	Gerald Leigh	1:39.70
1991	Selkirk	3	Ray Cochrane	Ian Balding	George Strawbridge	1:44.34
1992	Lahib	4	Willie Carson	John Dunlop	Hamdan Al Maktoum	1:44.50
1993	Bigstone	3	Pat Eddery	Élie Lellouche	Daniel Wildenstein	1:42.89
1994	Maroof	4	Richard Hills	Robert Armstrong	Hamdan Al Maktoum	1:42.75
1995	Bahri	3	Willie Carson	John Dunlop	Hamdan Al Maktoum	1:40.54
1996	Mark of Esteem	3	Frankie Dettori	Saeed bin Suroor	Godolphin	1:40.95
1997	Air Express	3	Olivier Peslier	Clive Brittain	Mohamed Obaida	1:40.90
1998	Desert Prince	3	Olivier Peslier	David Loder	Lucayan Stud	1:39.63
1999	Dubai Millennium	3	Frankie Dettori	Saeed bin Suroor	Godolphin	1:46.24
2000	Observatory	3	Kevin Darley	John Gosden	Khalid Abdullah	1:41.40
2001	Summoner	4	Richard Hills	Saeed bin Suroor	Godolphin	1:44.54
2002	Where Or When	3	Kevin Darley	Terry Mills	John Humphreys	1:41.37
2003	Falbrav	5	Darryll Holland	Luca Cumani	Rencati / Yoshida	1:38.99
2004	Rakti	5	Philip Robinson	Michael Jarvis	Gary Tanaka	1:39.82
2005 (Note: The 2005 edition was held at Newmarket)	Starcraft	5	Christophe Lemaire	Luca Cumani	The Australian Syndicate	1:37.87
2006	George Washington	3	Michael Kinane	Aidan O'Brien	Magnier / Tabor / Smith	1:40.06
2007	Ramonti	5	Frankie Dettori	Saeed bin Suroor	Godolphin	1:42.45
2008	Raven's Pass	3	Jimmy Fortune	John Gosden	Princess Haya of Jordan	1:38.94
2009	Rip Van Winkle	3	Johnny Murtagh	Aidan O'Brien	Magnier / Tabor / Smith	1:38.82
2010	Poet's Voice	3	Frankie Dettori	Saeed bin Suroor	Godolphin	1:39.76
2011	Frankel	3	Tom Queally	Sir Henry Cecil	Khalid Abdullah	1:39.45
2012	Excelebration	4	Joseph O'Brien	Aidan O'Brien	Smith / Magnier / Tabor	1:42.33
2013	Olympic Glory	3	Richard Hughes	Richard Hannon Sr.	Sheikh Joaan al Thani	1:44.18
2014	Charm Spirit	3	Olivier Peslier	Freddy Head	Abdullah bin Khalifa Al Thani	1:46.28
2015	Solow	5	Maxime Guyon	Freddy Head	Wertheimer et Frère	1:41.92
2016	Minding	3	Ryan Moore	Aidan O'Brien	Magnier / Tabor / Smith	1:38.53
2017	Persuasive	4	Frankie Dettori	John Gosden	Cheveley Park Stud	1:46.13
2018	Roaring Lion	3	Oisin Murphy	John Gosden	Qatar Racing	1:42.48
2019	King of Change	3	Sean Levey	Richard Hannon Jr.	Ali Abdulla Saeed	1:44.88
2020	The Revenant	5	Pierre-Charles Boudot	Francis-Henri Graffard	Al Asayl France	1:45.13
2021	Baaeed	3	Jim Crowley	William Haggas	Shadwell Estate	1:42.57
2022	Bayside Boy	3	Tom Marquand	Roger Varian	Teme Valley & Ballylinch Stud	1:45.53
2023	Big Rock	3	Aurélien Lemaitre	Christopher Head	Yeguada Centurion SL	1:44.58
2024	Charyn	4	Silvestre De Sousa	Roger Varian	Nurlan Bizakov	1:45.98
2025	Cicero's Gift	5	Jason Watson	Charles Hills	Rosehill Racing	1:38.35
2026	Talk Of New York	3	William Buick	Charlie Appleby	Godolphin	1:39.83

== Earlier winners ==
=== Knights' Royal Stakes ===
- 1947: Tudor Minstrel
- 1948: Djelal
- 1949: Wat Tyler
- 1950: Hyperbole
- 1951: Leading Light
- 1952: Tudor Castle
- 1953: King of the Tudors
- 1954: Umberto

== See also ==
- Horse racing in Great Britain
- List of British flat horse races
