= Prix Daniel Wildenstein =

Flat horse in France

- Class: Group 2
- Location: Longchamp Racecourse; Paris, France
- Inaugurated: 1882
- Race type: Flat / Thoroughbred
- Sponsor: Qatar
- Website: france-galop.com

Race information
- Distance: 1,600 metres (1 mile)
- Surface: Turf
- Track: Right-handed
- Qualification: Three-years-old and up
- Weight: 56½ kg (3yo); 58 kg (4yo+); Allowances; 1½ kg for fillies and mares Penalties; 2 kg for Group 1 winners * 2 kg if two Group 2 wins * 1 kg if one Group 2 win * * since January 1
- Purse: €200,000 (2021); 1st: €114,000

Prix Daniel Wildenstein
2025
| Ridari | Quddwah | Skukuza |

Previous years
2024
Ramadan | Andromede | Alcantor
2023
Poker Face | Isaac Shelby | Belbek
2022
Erevann | The Revenant | Checkandchallenge
2021
Real World | The Revenant | Novemba

2020-2011
2020
The Revenant | Ziegfeld | Motamarris
2019
The Revenant | Olmedo | Shaman
2018
Ostilio | Oh This Is Us | Hey Gaman
2017
Taareef | Buthela | Noor Al Hawa
2016
Taareef | Hello My Love | Moonlight Magic
2015
Impassable | Miss France | Akatea
2014
Solow | Veda | Sommerabend
2013
Pollyana | Pinturicchio | Siyenica
2012
Zinabaa | Dux Scholar | Evaporation
2011
Rajsaman | Rio De La Plata | Best Dating

2010–2000
2010
Royal Bench | Lochinver | Emerald Commander
2009
Tamazirte | Danse Grecque | Murcielago
2008
Spirito Del Vento | Sageburg | Famous Name
2007
Spirito Del Vento | Racinger | Blythe Knight
2006
Echo Of Light | Picaresque Coat | Hello Sunday
2005
Special Kaldoun | Polar Bear | Mathematician
2004
Cacique | Hurricane Alan | Mister Sacha
2003
Special Kaldoun | My Risk | Gateman
2002
Domedriver | Suggestive | Gateman
2001
China Visit | Jim And Tonic | Lugny

2000-1991
2000
Kabool | Kingsalsa | Sugarfoot
1999
Trans Island | Sugarfoot | Sand Falcon
1998
Fly To The Stars | Gold Away | Decorated Hero
1997
Decorated Hero | Kaldou Star | Marathon
1996
Alhaarth | Shaanxi | Bin Rosie
1995
Shaanxi | Petit Poucet | Nec Plus Ultra
1994
Missed Flight | Green Tune | Royal Abjar
1993
Voleris | Alflora | Maroof
1992
Arazi | Calling Collect | Alhijaz
1991
Bistro Garden | Goofalik | Eternity's Breath

1990-1988
1990
Zoman | Honor Rajana | Fils Unique
1989
Golden Opinion | Good Example | Star Touch
1988
In Extremis | Always Fair | Raise A Memory

The Prix Daniel Wildenstein is a Group 2 flat horse race in France open to thoroughbreds aged three years or older. It is run at Longchamp over a distance of 1,600 metres (about 1 mile), and it is scheduled to take place each year in late September or early October.

== History ==
The event was established in 1882, and it was originally called the Prix du Rond Point. It was initially run over 2,200 metres, and was cut to 2,000 metres in 1891. It was extended to 2,100 metres in 1903, and reverted to 2,000 metres in 1909.

The race was abandoned throughout World War I, with no running from 1914 to 1919. It was shortened to 1,600 metres in 1921, and increased to 1,700 metres in 1922.

The Prix du Rond Point was cancelled twice during World War II, in 1939 and 1940. It was held at Maisons-Laffitte in 1943, and Le Tremblay in 1944.

The distance was cut to 1,600 metres in 1953, and it returned to 1,700 metres in 1958. It was set at 1,400 metres in 1959, and restored to 1,600 metres in 1969.

The present system of race grading was introduced in 1971, and the Prix du Rond Point was classed at Group 3 level. For a period it took place in early September, and it was switched to late September in 1980.

The event was added to the two-day Prix de l'Arc de Triomphe meeting in 1987. For several years it was staged on the same day as the Arc, the first Sunday in October. It was promoted to Group 2 status in 1990, and moved to the Saturday of the meeting in 2001.

The race was renamed in memory of Daniel Wildenstein (1917–2001), a leading racehorse owner and breeder, in 2002.

== Records ==
Most successful horse (2 wins):

- Cameleon – 1889, 1890
- Le Meridional – 1955, 1957
- Special Kaldoun – 2003, 2005
- Spirito del Vento – 2007, 2008
- Taareef – 2016, 2017
- The Revenant - 2019, 2020

Leading jockey (5 wins):

- Yves Saint-Martin – Embellie (1965), Rockcress (1969), Prince Jet (1970), Faraway Son (1971), Monsanto (1976)
- Frankie Dettori – Decorated Hero (1997), Fly to the Stars (1998), Kabool (2000), China Visit (2001), Echo of Light (2006)
- Olivier Peslier – Spirito del Vento (2007, 2008), Royal Bench (2010), Solow (2014), Impassable (2015)

Leading trainer (4 wins):

- Richard Count – Champosoult (1894), Estragon (1896), Capo d'Istria (1897), Gorenflot (1898)
- Saeed bin Suroor – Fly to the Stars (1998), Kabool (2000), China Visit (2001), Echo of Light (2006)

Leading owner (4 wins):

- Emile Deschamps – Champosoult (1894), Estragon (1896), Gorenflot (1898), Vangoyen (1913)
- Godolphin – Fly to the Stars (1998), Kabool (2000), China Visit (2001), Echo of Light (2006)

== Winners since 1978 ==
| Year | Winner | Age | Jockey | Trainer | Owner | Time |
|---|---|---|---|---|---|---|
| 1978 | Homing | 3 | Willie Carson | Dick Hern | 2nd Baron Rotherwick | 1:35.60 |
| 1979 | Wolverton | 3 | Freddy Head | Alec Head | Jacques Wertheimer | 1:42.60 |
| 1980 | Hilal | 4 | Alfred Gibert | Mitri Saliba | Mahmoud Fustok | 1:42.60 |
| 1981 | Daeltown | 4 | Alain Lequeux | David Smaga | Xavier Beau | 1:47.30 |
| 1982 | Ya Zaman | 5 | Alfred Gibert | Mitri Saliba | Mahmoud Fustok |
| 1983 | Pampabird | 4 | Maurice Philipperon | John Cunnington Jr. | Paul de Moussac | 1:41.60 |
| 1984 | Duke of Silver | 3 | Alfred Gibert | André Fabre | William Kazan | 1:54.20 |
| 1985 | Pink | 4 | Freddy Head | Criquette Head | Jacques Wertheimer | 1:39.90 |
| 1986 | Magical Wonder | 3 | Jorge Velásquez | Georges Mikhalidès | Mahmoud Fustok | 1:43.80 |
| 1987 | Waajib | 4 | Michael Roberts | Alec Stewart | Hamdan Al Maktoum | 1:36.20 |
| 1988 | In Extremis | 3 | Guy Guignard | Criquette Head | Ecurie Aland | 1:38.40 |
| 1989 | Golden Opinion | 3 | Cash Asmussen | André Fabre | Sheikh Mohammed | 1:38.40 |
| 1990 | Zoman | 3 | Richard Quinn | Paul Cole | Fahd Salman | 1:38.30 |
| 1991 | Bistro Garden | 3 | Éric Legrix | Pascal Bary | Ross Gilbert | 1:39.00 |
| 1992 | Arazi | 3 | Steve Cauthen | François Boutin | Sheikh Mohammed | 1:44.00 |
| 1993 | Voleris | 4 | Cash Asmussen | John Hammond | David Thompson | 1:42.10 |
| 1994 | Missed Flight | 4 | George Duffield | Chris Wall | Walter Grubmuller | 1:39.00 |
| 1995 | Shaanxi | 3 | Dominique Boeuf | Élie Lellouche | Teruya Yoshida | 1:39.50 |
| 1996 | Alhaarth | 3 | Richard Hills | Dick Hern | Hamdan Al Maktoum | 1:38.60 |
| 1997 | Decorated Hero | 5 | Frankie Dettori | John Gosden | Herbert Allen | 1:35.90 |
| 1998 | Fly to the Stars | 4 | Frankie Dettori | Saeed bin Suroor | Godolphin | 1:41.20 |
| 1999 | Trans Island | 4 | Kieren Fallon | Ian Balding | Al Muallim Partnership | 1:44.90 |
| 2000 | Kabool | 5 | Frankie Dettori | Saeed bin Suroor | Godolphin | 1:36.40 |
| 2001 | China Visit | 4 | Frankie Dettori | Saeed bin Suroor | Godolphin | 1:44.80 |
| 2002 | Domedriver | 4 | Thierry Thulliez | Pascal Bary | Niarchos Family | 1:39.90 |
| 2003 | Special Kaldoun | 4 | Dominique Boeuf | David Smaga | Ecurie Chalhoub | 1:42.40 |
| 2004 | Cacique | 3 | Christophe Soumillon | André Fabre | Khalid Abdullah | 1:37.50 |
| 2005 | Special Kaldoun | 6 | Dominique Boeuf | David Smaga | Ecurie Chalhoub | 1:40.80 |
| 2006 | Echo of Light | 4 | Frankie Dettori | Saeed bin Suroor | Godolphin | 1:37.00 |
| 2007 | Spirito del Vento | 4 | Olivier Peslier | Jean-Marie Béguigné | Luigi Ciampi | 1:40.90 |
| 2008 | Spirito del Vento | 5 | Olivier Peslier | Jean-Marie Béguigné | Luigi Ciampi | 1:39.10 |
| 2009 | Tamazirte | 3 | Christophe Soumillon | Jean-Claude Rouget | Vallée Martigny / Rabineau | 1:38.60 |
| 2010 | Royal Bench | 3 | Olivier Peslier | Robert Collet | Richard Strauss | 1:44.30 |
| 2011 | Rajsaman | 4 | Thierry Jarnet | Freddy Head | Saeed Al Romaithi | 1:38.23 |
| 2012 | Zinabaa | 7 | Gérald Mossé | Michel Macé | Ecurie Victoria Dreams | 1:44.49 |
| 2013 | Pollyanna | 4 | Flavien Prat | Didier Prod'Homme | Bryan Lynam | 1:40.24 |
| 2014 | Solow | 4 | Olivier Peslier | Freddy Head | Wertheimer et Frère | 1:36.59 |
| 2015 | Impassable | 3 | Olivier Peslier | Carlos Laffon-Parias | Wertheimer et Frère | 1:37.65 |
| 2016 | Taareef (Note: The 2016 & 2017 races took place at Chantilly while Longchamp was closed for redevelopment) | 3 | Ioritz Mendizabal | Jean-Claude Rouget | Hamdan Al Maktoum | 1:43.19 |
| 2017 | Taareef | 4 | Christophe Soumillon | Jean-Claude Rouget | Hamdan Al Maktoum | 1:40.19 |
| 2018 | Ostilio | 3 | Andrea Atzeni | Simon Crisford | Mohammed Obaid Al Maktoum | 1:38.94 |
| 2019 | The Revenant | 4 | Pierre-Charles Boudot | Francis-Henri Graffard | Al Asayl France | 1:43.90 |
| 2020 | The Revenant | 5 | Pierre-Charles Boudot | Francis-Henri Graffard | Al Asayl France | 1:45.34 |
| 2021 | Real World | 4 | Frankie Dettori | Saeed bin Suroor | Godolphin | 1:41.72 |
| 2022 | Erevann | 3 | Christophe Soumillon | Jean-Claude Rouget | HH Aga Khan IV | 1:43.71 |
| 2023 | Poker Face | 4 | Maxime Guyon | Simon & Ed Crisford | Edward Ware | 1:37.45 |
| 2024 | Ramadan (Note: The 2024 winner Ramadan was later exported to Hong Kong.) | 3 | Aurelien Lemaitre | Christopher Head | Nurlan Bizakov | 1:39.52 |
| 2025 | Ridari | 3 | Mickael Barzalona | Mikel Delzangles | Aga Khan Studs SCEA | 1:40.45 |
| 2026 | Qirat | 5 | Silvestre De Sousa | Ralph Beckett | Juddmonte | 1:37.47 |

== Earlier winners ==
- 1882: Integre
- 1883: Precy
- 1884: Mahmoud
- 1885:
- 1886: Jaguar / Souci (Note: The 1886 race was a dead-heat and has joint winners)
- 1887:
- 1888: Halbran
- 1889: Cameleon
- 1890: Cameleon
- 1891:
- 1892: Cigare
- 1893:
- 1894: Champosoult
- 1895: Gibraltar
- 1896: Estragon
- 1897: Capo d'Istria
- 1898: Gorenflot
- 1899:
- 1900: Kiss
- 1901: Abdy
- 1902: Marechal Niel
- 1903:
- 1904: Xenophon
- 1905: Amalecite
- 1906: Le Horo
- 1907: Elysee
- 1908: Pyreneen
- 1909: Lezard
- 1910: Canteloup
- 1911: Joyeux
- 1912: Hargicourt
- 1913: Vangoyen
- 1914–19: no race
- 1920: Mounbeou
- 1921: Marvel
- 1922: Select
- 1923: Dauphin
- 1924: El Paso
- 1925: Condover
- 1926: Pacific
- 1927: Cosquillosa
- 1928: La Moqueuse
- 1929: Mysarch
- 1930: Ultra Violet
- 1931: Campra
- 1932: Angelico
- 1933: Relique
- 1934: Rarity
- 1935: Tracias
- 1936: Sanguinetto
- 1937: Aurangzeb
- 1938: Saint Preux
- 1939–40: no race
- 1941: Treacle
- 1942: Puymirol
- 1943: Mitchouby
- 1944: Nonant le Pin
- 1945: Epi d'Or
- 1946:
- 1947: Adios
- 1948: Clarion
- 1949:
- 1950: Bunker
- 1951: Eppi d'Or
- 1952: Ksarinor
- 1953: Fine Top
- 1954: Jolly Friar
- 1955: Le Meridional
- 1956: Le Mioche
- 1957: Le Meridional
- 1958: Tangation
- 1959: Petite Caille
- 1960: Mienne
- 1961:
- 1962: Phaleron
- 1963: Aquilla
- 1964: Musical
- 1965: Embellie
- 1966: Canadel
- 1967: Lemmy
- 1968: Montevideo
- 1969: Rockcress
- 1970: Prince Jet
- 1971: Faraway Son
- 1972: Daring Display
- 1973: Princess Arjumand
- 1974: Nonoalco
- 1975: Delmora
- 1976: Monsanto
- 1977: Pharly

== See also ==
- List of French flat horse races
- Recurring sporting events established in 1882 – this race is included under its original title, Prix du Rond Point.
