= Rose Bowl (horse) =

American-bred Thoroughbred racehorse

- Sire: Habitat
- Grandsire: Sir Gaylord
- Dam: Roseliere
- Damsire: Misti
- Sex: Mare
- Foaled: 24 May 1972
- Country: United States
- Colour: Bay
- Breeder: Cragwood Estates
- Owner: Jane Engelhard
- Trainer: Fulke Johnson Houghton
- Record: 16: 6–4–2

Major wins
- Nell Gwyn Stakes (1975); Queen Elizabeth II Stakes (1975, 1976); Champion Stakes (1975); Clive Graham Stakes

Awards
- Timeform rating 133; Timeform top-rated three-year-old filly (1975)

Rose Bowl (1972–1994) was an American-bred, British-trained Thoroughbred racehorse and broodmare. In a racing career which lasted from September 1974 until November 1976 she won six of her fourteen races and established herself as one of the best British race mares of the 1970s. After winning once as a two-year-old she won the Nell Gwyn Stakes on her first run in 1975 and then appeared to be a very unlucky loser of the 1000 Guineas. She returned from injury to show her best form in autumn, winning the Queen Elizabeth II Stakes over one mile and then defeated a top-class international field in the ten furlong Champion Stakes. She won a second Queen Elizabeth II Stakes and was narrowly beaten in the Champion Stakes in 1976, when her season was again disrupted by injury. She was then retired from racing and became a successful and influential broodmare.

== Background ==
Rose Bowl was a good-looking bay mare bred in Kentucky by the Engelhard family's Cragwood Estates. She was sired by Habitat, an American-bred, British-raced miler who became one of the leading European stallions of the 1970s and 1980s. His other progeny included Habibti, Marwell, Flying Water and Steinlen and he was the British Champion broodmare sire on three occasions. Rose Bowl's dam Roseliere was one of the leading fillies of her generation in Europe, winning the Prix de Diane and the Prix Vermeille. Timeform rated her the best three-year-old filly of 1968, with a rating on 127. Apart from Rose Bowl, Roseliere also produced the King George VI and Queen Elizabeth Stakes winner Ile de Bourbon. Both Habitat and Roseliere were owned by Charles W. Engelhard, Jr. (1917–1971) and Rose Bowl raced in the colours of his widow Jane.

The filly was sent to Europe and was trained by Fulke Johnson Houghton at the Woodway Stable near Blewbury in Wiltshire.

== Racing career ==
=== 1974: two-year-old season ===
Rose Bowl, was an extremely late foal, being born on 24 May, and did not race until late September when she finished second in a race over six furlongs at York and then recorded her first success in the Harwell Maiden Stakes over five furlongs at Newbury. She was then moved up sharply in class to contest the Group One Cheveley Park Stakes over six furlongs at Newmarket in October. She started a 25/1 outsider but exceeded expectations by finishing third behind Cry of Truth and Delmora. She was strongly fancied for the Group Three Cornwallis Stakes at Ascot later that month, but ran poorly, finishing fifth behind Paris Review. In the Free Handicap, a rating of the best two-year-olds to race in Britain, Rose Bowl was given a weight of 119 pounds, fourteen pounds behind the top colt Grundy and twelve pounds behind Cry of Truth.

=== 1975: three-year-old season ===
Rose Bowl began her three-year-old season at Newmarket in the seven furlong Nell Gwyn Stakes, a trial race for the 1000 Guineas. Ridden by Lester Piggott, she started the 7/4 favourite and won impressively by three lengths from Posy with Cry of Truth unplaced. On 1 May, over the Rowley Mile course at Newmarket, Rose Bowl again started 7/4 favourite, but finished fourth behind Nocturnal Spree, Girl Friend and Joking Apart. Piggott had been unable to obtain a clear run on the favourite, who was boxed in on the rail and Rose Bowl appeared to have been an unlucky loser. The filly then sustained a muscle injury which kept her off the racecourse for almost three months.

Rose Bowl returned to racing in the Group One Sussex Stakes over one mile at Goodwood in which she was matched against colts and older horses. Ridden again by Piggott she finished second in a three-way photo-finish, a "fast-diminishing" neck behind the 2000 Guineas winner Bolkonski and a short-head in front of the leading sprinter Lianga. A month later, over the same course and distance, she and Piggott finished second to Gay Fandango in a "muddling race" for the Waterford Crystal Mile, with Roussalka (winner of the Coronation Stakes and the Nassau Stakes) in third place.

In the autumn of 1975, Rose Bowl established herself as the outstanding filly in Europe. In September she ran in the Queen Elizabeth II Stakes (then a Group Two race) over one mile at Ascot. Ridden by Willie Carson as Piggott had chosen to ride Gay Fandango she started at odds of 9/2 in a field of five runners and won from Gay Fandango, Anne's Pretender and Bolkonski. In October, Rose Bowl was moved up in distance for the Group One Champion Stakes at Newmarket, in which she was matched against the Prix de l'Arc de Triomphe winners Allez France and Star Appeal. Ridden again by Carson, she won the race from Allez France with the Prix d'Ispahan winner Ramirez in third and Star Appeal unplaced.

=== 1976: four-year-old season ===
Rose Bowl began her third season by finishing fourth in a blanket finish for the Prix Ganay and then won the second running of the Clive Graham Stakes over ten furlongs at Goodwood in May, easily beating Red Ransom and Anne's Pretender. On 15 June she was sent to Royal Ascot where she was injured when finishing third to the subsequently disqualified Trepan in the Prince of Wales's Stakes.

In autumn she returned to form to beat Ricco Boy and Dominion in the Queen Elizabeth II Stakes, becoming the second horse, after Brigadier Gerard to win the race twice. In the Champion Stakes she came close to a second repeat win, but finished second of the nineteen runners, a neck behind the winner Vitiges. On her final appearance, Rose Bowl was sent to the United States for the Washington, D.C. International. Racing over one and a half miles for the first time she failed to reproduce her best form and finished unplaced behind the French-trained three-year-old Youth.

== Assessment ==
In 1975, the independent Timeform organisation gave Rose Bowl a rating of 133, making her the highest-rated three-year-old filly of the season: up to that time the only three-year-old fillies to have been rated more highly had been Coronation in 1949 and Petite Etoile in 1959. In their book, A Century of Champions, based on the Timeform rating system, John Randall and Tony Morris rated Rose Bowl the sixteenth best British or Irish filly of the 20th century.

== Stud record ==
On her retirement from racing, Rose Bowl became a broodmare for the stud of Paul Mellon. She was consistently successful, producing at least eight winners:

- Golden Bowl (bay filly foaled 1978, sired by Vaguely Noble), won 3 races including the LR Lupe Stakes at Goodwood and placed 3 times including 2nd G3 Cheshire Oaks at Chester from 12 starts in Britain 1980–81
- Crystal Cup (bay filly, 1981, by Nijinsky (CAN) - unplaced both starts, dam of winners including Iktamal and Crystal Cross (1989, by Roberto)
- Rose Reef (chesnut colt, 1984, by Mill Reef), won 4 races including the G3 Gladness Stakes at the Curragh and placed 4 times from 11 starts in Britain and Ireland. At stud in Japan.
- Antigua Rose (bay filly 1985, by Mill Reef), winner
- Rose Campion (bay filly 1986, by Mill Reef), won one race
- Sunset Rose (bay filly 1987, by Shirley Heights), won two races
- Rokeby (bay colt 1989, by Lomond), won two races, 3rd in the Wood Memorial Stakes
- Pure Bravado (bay colt 1990 by Dancing Brave), winner
- Rokeby Bowl (bay colt 1992 by Salse), won six races

Golden Bowl produced the Prix Exbury winner Nero Zilzal, while Antigua Rose was the grand-dam of the Queen's Plate winner Strait of Dover. Rose Bowl's daughter Browser (by Nijinsky), produced the Athenia Handicap winner High Browser. Browser's full sister Crystal Cup produced Iktamal (Haydock Sprint Cup) and First Magnitude (Prix du Conseil de Paris).

== Pedigree ==
Pedigree of Rose Bowl (USA), bay mare, 1972
Sire Habitat (USA) 1966	Sir Gaylord (USA); 1959	Turn-To	Royal Charger
Sire Habitat (USA) 1966	Sir Gaylord (USA); 1959	Turn-To	Source Sucree
Sire Habitat (USA) 1966	Sir Gaylord (USA); 1959	Somethingroyal	Princequillo
Sire Habitat (USA) 1966	Sir Gaylord (USA); 1959	Somethingroyal	Imperatrice
Sire Habitat (USA) 1966	Little Hut (USA); 1952	Occupy	Bull Dog
Sire Habitat (USA) 1966	Little Hut (USA); 1952	Occupy	Miss Bunting
Sire Habitat (USA) 1966	Little Hut (USA); 1952	Savage Beauty	Challenger
Sire Habitat (USA) 1966	Little Hut (USA); 1952	Savage Beauty	Khara
Dam Roseliere (FR) 1969	Misti (FR); 1958	Medium	Meridien
Dam Roseliere (FR) 1969	Misti (FR); 1958	Medium	Melodie
Dam Roseliere (FR) 1969	Misti (FR); 1958	Mist	Tornado
Dam Roseliere (FR) 1969	Misti (FR); 1958	Mist	La Touche
Dam Roseliere (FR) 1969	Peace Rose (FR); 1959	Fastnet Rock	Ocean Swell
Dam Roseliere (FR) 1969	Peace Rose (FR); 1959	Fastnet Rock	Stone of Fortune
Dam Roseliere (FR) 1969	Peace Rose (FR); 1959	La Paix	Seven Seas
Dam Roseliere (FR) 1969	Peace Rose (FR); 1959	La Paix	Anne de Bretagne (Family:4-i)
