= Marwell (horse) =

Irish-bred, British-trained Thoroughbred racehorse

- Sire: Habitat
- Grandsire: Sir Gaylord
- Dam: Lady Seymour
- Damsire: Tudor Melody
- Sex: Mare
- Foaled: 21 May 1978
- Country: Ireland
- Colour: Bay
- Breeder: Edmund Loder
- Owner: Edmund Loder
- Trainer: Michael Stoute
- Record: 13:10-2-0

Major wins
- Molecomb Stakes (1980); Flying Childers Stakes (1980); Cheveley Park Stakes (1980); Fred Darling Stakes (1981); Gus Demmy Memorial (1981); King's Stand Stakes (1981); July Cup (1981); Prix de l'Abbaye (1981)

Awards
- Timeform rating 133 (1981); Timeform top-rated two-year-old filly (1980); Top-rated European two-year-old filly (1980); Timeform top-rated three-year-old filly (1981); Top-rated European three-year-old filly (1981)
- Last updated on 27 July 2022

Marwell (21 May 1978 – October 2003) was an Irish-bred, British-trained Thoroughbred racehorse and broodmare. A specialist sprinter, she won ten of her thirteen races, including several against colts and older horses. She was also the highest-rated filly of her generation in Europe at both two and three years of age. She won all five of her races as a two-year-old in 1980, including the Molecomb Stakes, Flying Childers Stakes and Cheveley Park Stakes. In the following year, she was beaten over a mile in the classic 1000 Guineas but returned to sprinting to win the King's Stand Stakes July Cup and Prix de l'Abbaye. She was retired from racing at the end of 1981 and became a successful broodmare. Marwell died in 2003.

== Background ==
Marwell was a bay filly with no white markings bred by her owner, Edmund Loder, at the family's Eyresfield Stud near the Curragh in County Kildare. She was sired by Habitat, an American-bred, British-raced miler who became one of the leading European stallions of the 1970s and 1980s. His other progeny included Habibti, Rose Bowl, Flying Water, and Steinlen and he was the British Champion broodmare sire on three occasions. Her dam, Lady Seymour, was undefeated in two races, including the Phoenix Stakes (then a Group Two race) in 1974. As a daughter of My Game, Lady Seymour was also closely related to the Ascot Gold Cup winner Paean and the Oaks winner Unite.

Loder sent his filly into training with Michael Stoute at his Freemason Lodge stable in Newmarket, where she was an exact contemporary of Shergar. She was usually ridden by Lester Piggott in her early races, before Stoute's new stable jockey Walter Swinburn took over in 1981.

== Racing career ==
=== 1980: two-year-old season ===
As a two-year-old in 1980, Marwell was unbeaten in five races, beginning with a four-length success in the Chesterfield Stakes over five furlong at Newmarket Racecourse. After one minor win, she was moved up in class and sent to Goodwood Racecourse in July for the five-furlong Molecomb Stakes. Ridden by Lester Piggott, she won the Group Three event at odds of 4/6 from Swan Princess with the Queen Mary Stakes winner Pushy in third place. Stoute considered moving the filly up in distance for the Lowther Stakes at York Racecourse in August but opted for the Prince of Wales's Stakes on the following day. She defeated Welshwyn by one and a half lengths despite carrying a seven-pound weight penalty for her Goodwood success. With Piggott serving a suspension, Greville Starkey took the ride on Marwell when the filly was matched against colts in the Group Two Flying Childers Stakes at Doncaster Racecourse in September. She was made the 4/11 favourite and after starting slowly took the lead approaching the final furlong and drew clear of her opponents to win by three lengths despite being eased down in the closing stages. On her final appearance of the season, Marwell contested the Cheveley Park Stakes, then the only Group One race in the United Kingdom restricted to two-year-old fillies. Ridden again by Piggott, she won at odds of 4/9 from Welshwyn and Pushy.

=== 1981: three-year-old season ===
On her first appearance of the 1981 season, Marwell was moved up in distance for the seven-furlong Fred Darling Stakes at Newbury Racecourse, a trial race for the 1000 Guineas. Ridden for the first time by the nineteen-year-old Walter Swinburn, she won, although her opposition was not regarded as particularly strong. On 30 April, Marwell was one of fourteen fillies to contest the 1000 Guineas over Newmarket's Rowley Mile course. Despite doubts about her ability to stay the distance, she was well-fancied but finished fourth, a length behind favourite Fairy Footsteps. Although her defeat was widely attributed to a lack of stamina, Swinburn later stated that the filly could have won the race had she not been in season. On 19 May, Marwell returned to sprinting for the Gus Demmy Memorial Stakes over six furlong at Haydock Park Racecourse and produced a "most impressive performance" to beat July Stakes winner Age Quod Agis.

In June, Marwell was matched against colts and older horses at Royal Ascot in the King's Stand Stakes, one of three Group One, all-aged sprints run in Europe at that time. Starting the 5/4 favourite, she overtook the front-running Standaan approaching the final furlong and pulled clear with what was described as "a blistering turn of acceleration" to win impressively. On her next appearance, she ran in the six furlong July Cup at Newmarket, in which she was opposed by Moorestyle, the outstanding sprinter of 1980. Swinburn had to attend a disciplinary hearing at the Jockey Club on the morning of the race but had a car standing by and reached Newmarket in time to ride the filly. Marwell and Moorestyle moved to the front of the field a furlong from the finish before the filly accelerated clear to win. Marwell returned to five furlongs for the Group Two William Hill Sprint Championship on soft ground at York Racecourse in August. In what was considered a major upset, she finished second, beaten two and a half lengths by Sharpo, who recorded the second of his three wins in the race at odds of 14/1.

At Haydock in September, Marwell sustained another upset defeat in the Vernons Sprint Cup when she was narrowly beaten by Runnett, a four-year-old who had finished third in the King's Stand Stakes. On her final appearance, Marwell was sent to France for the Group One Prix de l'Abbaye over 1000 metres at Longchamp Racecourse in October. She won her third Group One of the year, beating Sharpo into second place.

== Assessment ==
In 1980, the independent Timeform organisation awarded Marwell a rating of 124, making her the highest-rated two-year-old filly. In the official International Classification, she shared first place with Tolmi, the winner of the Princess Margaret Stakes. In the following year, Marwell was the rated the best three-year-old filly of the year by the International Classification and by Timeform, with the latter organisation rating her at 133. In their annual Racehorses of 1981, Timeform commented, "Sprinting will be fortunate indeed to see her like among the so-called weaker sex inside another few seasons".

In their book A Century of Champions, John Randall and Tony Morris rated Marwell the 26th best filly trained in Britain or Ireland in the 20th century and placed her 35th in their list of sprinters.

== Breeding record ==
After her retirement from racing, Marwell returned to her birthplace at Eyresfield and became a broodmare. She produced at least eight individual winners, including two who succeeded at Group One level:

- Caerwent (bay colt foaled in 1985, sired by Caerleon), won Irish National Stakes
- Selaah (bay colt 1987 by Rainbow Quest), won three races
- Marling (bay filly 1989 by Lomond), won Cheveley Park Stakes, Irish 1,000 Guineas, Coronation Stakes, Sussex Stakes
- Expedient Option (bay colt 1990 by Sadler's Wells), won one race
- Wellspring (bay filly 1994, sired by Caerleon), won one race
- Marwell's Kris (bay colt 1996 by Kris), won five races
- Littlefeather (bay filly 1997, sired by Indian Ridge), won four races
- Music Celebre (bay colt 2000 by Peintre Celebre), won six races

Marwell was retired from stud duties in 2002 at the age of 24 and was euthanised at Eyresfield in the following October. Swinburn paid tribute to Marwell, calling her "a fabulous filly who did as much to get me established as Shergar" and "a very special friend".

== Pedigree ==
Pedigree of Marwell (IRE), bay mare, 1978
Sire Habitat (USA) 1966	Sir Gaylord (USA); 1959	Turn-To	Royal Charger
Sire Habitat (USA) 1966	Sir Gaylord (USA); 1959	Turn-To	Source Sucree
Sire Habitat (USA) 1966	Sir Gaylord (USA); 1959	Somethingroyal	Princequillo
Sire Habitat (USA) 1966	Sir Gaylord (USA); 1959	Somethingroyal	Imperatrice
Sire Habitat (USA) 1966	Little Hut (USA); 1952	Occupy	Bull Dog
Sire Habitat (USA) 1966	Little Hut (USA); 1952	Occupy	Miss Bunting
Sire Habitat (USA) 1966	Little Hut (USA); 1952	Savage Beauty	Challenger
Sire Habitat (USA) 1966	Little Hut (USA); 1952	Savage Beauty	Kara
Dam Lady Seymour (GB) 1972	Tudor Melody (GB); 1956	Tudor Minstrel	Owen Tudor
Dam Lady Seymour (GB) 1972	Tudor Melody (GB); 1956	Tudor Minstrel	Sansonnet
Dam Lady Seymour (GB) 1972	Tudor Melody (GB); 1956	Matelda	Dante
Dam Lady Seymour (GB) 1972	Tudor Melody (GB); 1956	Matelda	Fairly Hot
Dam Lady Seymour (GB) 1972	My Game (IRE); 1957	My Babu	Djebel
Dam Lady Seymour (GB) 1972	My Game (IRE); 1957	My Babu	Perfume
Dam Lady Seymour (GB) 1972	My Game (IRE); 1957	Flirting	Big Game
Dam Lady Seymour (GB) 1972	My Game (IRE); 1957	Flirting	Overture (Family:14-c)
