= Wally Swinburn =

Irish jockey

Walter Robert Swinburn (born 1937) is a retired jockey who competed in Flat racing. He was Irish flat racing Champion Jockey in 1976 and 1977, and was the first jockey to ride 100 winners in a season in Ireland. He was based at various times in Britain, India, France and Ireland. His career lasted from 1951 to the end of the 1982 season and following his retirement he owned a stud farm in Newmarket. His son, Walter Swinburn (1961–2016), was also a successful jockey.

== Major winners ==
Ireland

- Irish 1,000 Guineas - (2) - Pidget (1972), Prince's Polly (1982)
- Irish Oaks - (1) - Blue Wind (1981)
- Phoenix Stakes - (1) - Smokey Lady (1979)

Great Britain

- Sussex Stakes - (1) - Romulus (1962)
