= Habibti (horse) =

Irish-bred, British-trained Thoroughbred racehorse (foaled 1980)

- Sire: Habitat
- Grandsire: Sir Gaylord
- Dam: Klairessa
- Damsire: Klairon
- Sex: Mare
- Foaled: March 29, 1980
- Country: Ireland
- Colour: Brown
- Breeder: John Costelloe
- Owner: Mohamed Mutawa
- Trainer: John Dunlop
- Record: 17: 9–2–4

Major wins
- Lowther Stakes (1982); Moyglare Stud Stakes (1982); July Cup (1983); William Hill Sprint Championship (1983); Vernons Sprint Cup (1983); Prix de l'Abbaye (1983); Leisure Stakes (1984); King's Stand Stakes (1984)

Awards
- British Horse of the Year (1983); Timeform Horse of the Year (1983); Gilbey Champion Racehorse of the Year (1983); Timeform rating: 136
- Last updated on 17 June 2024

Habibti (foaled March 1980) was an Irish-bred, British-trained Thoroughbred racehorse and broodmare who was one of the highest-rated sprinters in European racing history. Habibti was unbeaten as a two-year-old, winning the Group Two Lowther Stakes in England and the Moyglare Stud Stakes in Ireland. In early 1983 she was campaigned over longer distances without success before being switched to sprinting in summer. She won her remaining four races that season, taking the July Cup at Newmarket, the William Hill Sprint Championship at York, the Vernons Sprint Cup at Haydock Park and the Prix de l'Abbaye at Longchamp Racecourse. At the end of the season she was named Britain's Horse of the Year and was rated the best three-year-old filly of the last thirty-six years by Timeform. Habibti was less successful when kept in training at four, but did win the King's Stand Stakes at Royal Ascot. At the end of 1984 she was retired to stud, where she had little success as a producer of winners.

== Background ==
Habibti was a brown mare with a white sock on her right hind foot bred in Ireland by John Costelloe. She was sired by Habitat, an American-bred, British-raced miler who became one of the leading European stallions of the 1970s and 1980s. His other progeny included Flying Water, Marwell, Rose Bowl and Steinlen and he was the British Champion broodmare sire on three occasions. Her dam, Klairessa, won one minor race and was a full-sister to the King's Stand Stakes winner D'Urberville and three-quarters sister to Lora (by Lorenzaccio) who produced the 1000 Guineas winner On the House. In addition to Habibti, Klairessa also produced a colt by General Assembly named Knesset, who won the Ballyogan Stakes in 1988 and Eight Carat, who showed little ability on the racecourse, but produced five Group One winners including Octagonal.

As a yearling, Habibti was sent to the sales where she was bought for 140,000 guineas. She entered into the ownership of Muhamed Mutawa who named the filly after the Arabic term of affection "habibi" meaning "my beloved". The filly was trained at Arundel in West Sussex by John Dunlop and ridden in most of her races by Willie Carson.

== Racing career ==
=== 1982: two-year-old season ===
As a two-year-old in 1982, Habibti was unbeaten in three races despite being difficult to train early in the season. After winning a maiden race on her debut in July, Habibti was sent to York in August to contest the six furlong Lowther Stakes. Ridden by Willie Carson, she won at odds of 11/4, beating the future Breeders' Cup Mile winner Royal Heroine. Three weeks later, Habibti traveled to Ireland for the Moyglare Stud Stakes (then a Group Two race) and won ridden by Declan Gillespie.

=== 1983: three-year-old season ===
Habibti began her three-year-old season with a run at Newbury in the Fred Darling Stakes, a recognised trial for the 1000 Guineas. Racing over seven furlongs for the first time she finished third to Prix Marcel Boussac winner Goodbye Shelley after weakening in the closing stages. On 28 April, Habibti started the 10/1 third favourite for the 1000 Guineas over the Rowley Mile course at Newmarket. She finished fourth of the eighteen runners behind the French-trained favourite Ma Biche, although she was later promoted to third after the runner-up, Royal Heroine, failed a dope test. Three weeks later, Habibti was tried over one mile for the second and final time in the Irish 1,000 Guineas at the Curragh on 21 May. Running on heavy ground, she apparently failed to stay the distance as she finished ninth, beaten more than fourteen lengths by the winner L'Attrayante.

Habibti was then brought back in distance to race against specialised sprinters in the Group One July Cup at Newmarket on 7 July. Racing over six furlongs on faster ground, she settled behind the leaders before moving up to take the lead entering the final furlong. She quickly went clear and won comfortably by two and a half lengths from Soba, a four-year-old filly who had won eleven races, including the Stewards' Cup, in 1982. In August, Habibti ran over five furlongs in the William Hill Sprint Championship at York, in which she was made 13/8 favourite ahead of Soba, who was expected to be suited by the shorter distance. Carson restrained the filly in the early stages before taking the lead inside the final furlong and going three lengths clear of the field. She was eased down in the closing stages to win by a length and a half from Soba, who was later disqualified for causing interference early in the race.

On 3 September, Habibti and Soba met for the third time in the Vernons Sprint Cup over six furlongs at Haydock Park. Two furlongs from the finish, Carson was sitting still on the 8/13 favourite as his rival jockeys were driving their mounts to maintain the pace. When Carson asked Habibti to quicken, she quickly settled the race and drew clear of the field to win by seven lengths. Timeform described the performance as "one of the best performances ever likely to be seen at Haydock, or anywhere else". On her final run of the year, Habibti was sent to France for the Prix de l'Abbaye over 1000 metres at Longchamp Racecourse in October. She took the lead 200m from the finish and was driven out by Carson to win by a length from Soba in a time of 54.3, breaking the previous track record by 1.2 seconds.

=== 1984: four-year-old season ===
Habibti began her four-year-old season in June, when she ran in the Leisure Stakes, a newly instituted race at Lingfield Park. She won by a length from the previous year's King's Stand Stakes winner Sayf El Arab. Later that month Habibti was sent to Royal Ascot for the 1984 renewal of the King's Stand Stakes over five furlongs on fast ground. The race saw a protracted struggle for the lead between Sayf El Arab and the Irish-trained Anita's Prince, and Habibti was six lengths behind the leaders with a quarter of a mile to run. Under a vigorous ride from Carson, Habibti made ground throughout the closing stages and caught Anita's Prince on the line to win by a short head. The filly was by this time unbeaten in her last six races and started odds-on favourite for her second July Cup. Her run of success came to an end, however, as she finished fifth behind the three-year-old colt Chief Singer.

Habibti failed to win in her remaining four starts, although she was placed on each occasion. She was beaten two and a half lengths by the Irish filly Committed in the William Hill Sprint Championship and was then beaten a short head by the outsider Petong in the Vernons Sprint Cup. In autumn she ran third to Never So Bold in the Diadem Stakes and ended her career by finishing second to Committed in the Prix de l'Abbaye.

== Assessment ==
In the official International Classification for 1983, Habibti was given a rating of 91, making her the highest-rated three-year-old filly and the highest-rated sprinter in Europe, and the third best horse behind Shareef Dancer and All Along. The independent Timeform organisation described the ranking as "ludicrous" and rated Habibti the best horse of the year. Her annual Timeform rating of 136 was the highest awarded to a three-year-old filly in the organisation's history, and the fourth highest given to a sprinter behind Abernant (142 in 1950), Pappa Fourway (139 in 1955) and Right Boy (137 in 1959). The two rating systems did not use the same scale: a rating of 91 in the International Classification was equivalent to a Timeform rating of 131. In the polling for British Horse of the Year, organised by the Racegoers Club, Habibti won the title with 23 of the 26 votes. She was also the winner of the Gilbey Champion Racehorse award, based on points accrued by performances in major races during the season.

As a four-year-old she was rated at 80 by the International Classification and 123 by Timeform, which summed up her career by describing her as "a magnificent filly with a blistering turn of speed".

In their book, A Century of Champions, based on the Timeform rating system, John Randall and Tony Morris rated Habibti the fifteenth best filly and the seventeenth best sprinter to have been trained in Britain or Ireland in the 20th century.

== Stud record ==
Habibti had a disappointing record as a broodmare, producing only one minor winner, a filly named Desert Lily. By far her best descendant was Morshdi, a colt sired by Slip Anchor out of her daughter Reem Albaraari. He won the Derby Italiano and the Grosser Preis von Baden in 2001 but failed at stud, where he proved to be completely infertile.

== Pedigree ==
Pedigree of Habibti (IRE), brown mare, 1980
Sire Habitat (USA) 1966	Sir Gaylord; 1959	Turn-To	Royal Charger
Sire Habitat (USA) 1966	Sir Gaylord; 1959	Turn-To	Source Sucree
Sire Habitat (USA) 1966	Sir Gaylord; 1959	Somethingroyal	Princequillo
Sire Habitat (USA) 1966	Sir Gaylord; 1959	Somethingroyal	Imperatrice
Sire Habitat (USA) 1966	Little Hut; 1952	Occupy	Bull Dog
Sire Habitat (USA) 1966	Little Hut; 1952	Occupy	Miss Bunting
Sire Habitat (USA) 1966	Little Hut; 1952	Savage Beauty	Challenger
Sire Habitat (USA) 1966	Little Hut; 1952	Savage Beauty	Khara
Dam Klairessa (GB) 1969	Klairon; 1952	Clarion	Djebel
Dam Klairessa (GB) 1969	Klairon; 1952	Clarion	Columba
Dam Klairessa (GB) 1969	Klairon; 1952	Kalmia	Kantar
Dam Klairessa (GB) 1969	Klairon; 1952	Kalmia	Sweet Lavender
Dam Klairessa (GB) 1969	Courtessa; 1955	Supreme Court	Precipitation
Dam Klairessa (GB) 1969	Courtessa; 1955	Supreme Court	Forecourt
Dam Klairessa (GB) 1969	Courtessa; 1955	Tessa Gillian	Nearco
Dam Klairessa (GB) 1969	Courtessa; 1955	Tessa Gillian	Sun Princess (Family:9-c)
