= Flying Water =

French-bred Thoroughbred racehorse

- Sire: Habitat
- Grandsire: Sir Gaylord
- Dam: Formentera
- Damsire: Ribot
- Sex: Mare
- Foaled: 8 April 1973
- Country: France
- Colour: Chestnut
- Breeder: Dayton Ltd
- Owner: Daniel Wildenstein
- Trainer: Angel Penna Sr.
- Record: 11: 6-0-0

Major wins
- Nell Gwyn Stakes (1976); 1000 Guineas (1976); Prix Maurice de Gheest (1977); Prix Jacques Le Marois (1977); Champion Stakes (1977)

Honours
- Top-rated older female in Europe (1977); Timeform rating: 132

Flying Water (8 April 1973 – 25 June 1978) was a French Thoroughbred racehorse. In a racing career that was disrupted by injury, she ran eleven times and won six races between July 1975 and June 1978. After winning her only race as a two-year-old, she won the Classic 1000 Guineas at Newmarket Racecourse in the spring of 1977. Having missed the second half of her three-year-old season through injury, she returned in 1978. She defeated leading sprinters in the Prix Maurice de Gheest, mile specialists in the Prix Jacques Le Marois, and middle-distances horses in the Champion Stakes. In 1978, she was sent to race in the United States where she was killed in an accident in a race at Belmont Park on 25 June.

== Background ==
Flying Water was a dark chestnut filly with a white star and a white sock on her left foreleg, bred in France by Dayton Ltd. She was sired by Habitat, an American-bred, British-raced miler who became one of the leading European stallions of the 1970s and 1980s. His other progeny included Habibti, Marwell, Rose Bowl, and Steinlen and he was the British Champion broodmare sire on three occasions. Flying Water's dam, Formentera was a half-sister to the Grand Prix de Saint-Cloud winner Felicio and closely related to The Derby winner St. Paddy.

During her racing career, Flying Water was owned by Daniel Wildenstein and trained by Angel Penna Sr. In 1976, Wildenstein and Penna won three of the five British Classics: in addition to Flying Water's 1000 Guineas, they won The Oaks with Pawneese and the St Leger with Crow.

== Racing career ==
=== 1975–1976: early career ===
Flying Water made her first appearance at Chantilly Racecourse in July 1975 and won a maiden race over 1200m, beating a filly called Imogene. The form of the race was later boosted when Imogene finished second to Vitiges in the Group One Prix Morny. Shortly afterwards, the filly developed a splint in one of her legs and was unable to race again that year.

On her first appearance of 1976, Flying Water was sent to England for the seven furlong Nell Gwyn Stakes at Newmarket. She won the Group Three event by three lengths and was immediately made favourite for the 1000 Guineas. Three weeks later, Flying Water, ridden by Yves Saint-Martin, started 2/1 favourite in a field of twenty-five fillies for the 1000 Guineas. The field split into two groups across the wide Rowley Mile course, with Flying Water towards the back of the group furthest from the stands. In the closing stages, she produced a strong burst of acceleration to take the lead inside the final furlong and win by a length from Konafa and Kesar Queen. Her winning time of 1:37.83 was 0.26 seconds faster than that set by the colt Wollow in the 2000 Guineas the previous day. Just over a month later, Penna won the Epsom Oaks with Pawneese, a filly he reportedly regarded as Flying Water's superior.

Flying Water returned to France and moved up in distance for her next start, finishing sixth behind Riverqueen in the Prix Saint-Alary. During the race, she sustained a chipped bone in one of her feet which ruled her out for the rest of the year and put her racing career in serious doubt. Flying Water eventually recovered after being sent to the United States for an operation.

=== 1977–1978; later career ===
After a break of more than a year, Flying Water resumed her career by finishing fifth to the three-year-old filly Polyponder in the Prix de la Porte Maillot at Longchamp. In August, she was moved down in distance for the Prix Maurice de Gheest (then a Group Three) over 1300m at Deauville. Competing against specialist sprinters, Flying Water won from Girl Friend, a mare who had won the race in 1976, with Polyponder finishing third to give females a clean sweep of the places. Flying Water returned to Deauville later that month for the Prix Jacques Le Marois, one of France's most important weight-for-age mile races. In a race run at a "muddling" pace, she showed superior speed in the closing stages to win by half a length from Blushing Groom and Trepan. In September, she ran poorly behind Pharly in the Prix du Moulin, a performance which Penna was unable to explain.

On her final European appearance, Flying Water returned to Newmarket for the Champion Stakes in October. Having run poorly in her only previous race over a distance further than a mile (in the Prix Saint-Alary), she was not strongly fancied and started at odds of 9/1. As in her previous start, the filly was suited by a slow pace and accelerated clear inside the final furlong to win by two lengths from the Benson & Hedges Gold Cup winner Relkino.

In 1978, Angel Penna moved his training base to the United States, taking many of his horses, including Flying Water, with him. On her second American start, the mare contested a division of the New York Handicap on the turf course at Belmont Park on 25 June. Early in the straight, Flying Water collided with the running rail when moving up to the leaders and fell heavily, throwing her jockey Jean Cruguet. A broken shoulder was diagnosed, and Flying Water was euthanised.

== Assessment and honours ==
In the first official International Classification, a collaboration between the handicappers in Britain, Ireland, and France, Flying Water was rated the best older female racehorse in Europe in 1977. The independent Timeform organisation concurred, awarding her a rating of 132.

In their book A Century of Champions, based on the Timeform rating system, John Randall and Tony Morris rated Flying Water a "superior" winner of the 1000 Guineas.

== Pedigree ==
Pedigree of Flying Water (FR), chestnut mare, 1973
Sire Habitat (USA) 1966	Sir Gaylord; 1959	Turn-To	Royal Charger
Sire Habitat (USA) 1966	Sir Gaylord; 1959	Turn-To	Source Sucree
Sire Habitat (USA) 1966	Sir Gaylord; 1959	Somethingroyal	Princequillo
Sire Habitat (USA) 1966	Sir Gaylord; 1959	Somethingroyal	Imperatrice
Sire Habitat (USA) 1966	Little Hut; 1952	Occupy	Bull Dog
Sire Habitat (USA) 1966	Little Hut; 1952	Occupy	Miss Bunting
Sire Habitat (USA) 1966	Little Hut; 1952	Savage Beauty	Challenger
Sire Habitat (USA) 1966	Little Hut; 1952	Savage Beauty	Khara
Dam Formentera (FR) 1968	Ribot; 1952	Tenerani	Bellini
Dam Formentera (FR) 1968	Ribot; 1952	Tenerani	Tofanella
Dam Formentera (FR) 1968	Ribot; 1952	Romanella	El Greco
Dam Formentera (FR) 1968	Ribot; 1952	Romanella	Barbara Burrini
Dam Formentera (FR) 1968	Fighting Edie; 1956	Guersant	Bubbles
Dam Formentera (FR) 1968	Fighting Edie; 1956	Guersant	Montagnana
Dam Formentera (FR) 1968	Fighting Edie; 1956	Edie Kelly	Bois Roussel
Dam Formentera (FR) 1968	Fighting Edie; 1956	Edie Kelly	Caerlissa (Family:14-c)
