= Steinlen (horse) =

British-bred Thoroughbred racehorse

- Sire: Habitat
- Grandsire: Sir Gaylord
- Dam: Southern Seas
- Damsire: Jim French
- Sex: Stallion
- Foaled: 1983
- Country: United Kingdom
- Colour: dark bay/brown
- Breeder: Allez France Stables
- Owner: Harris Farms
- Trainer: D. Wayne Lukas
- Record: 45: 20-10-7
- Earnings: $3,297,169

Major wins
- El Rincon Handicap (1988); Inglewood Handicap (1988, 1989); Laurel Dash Stakes (1988); Premiere Handicap (1988); Arlington Million Stakes (1989); Bernard Baruch Handicap (1989); Daryl's Joy Stakes (1989); Keeneland Breeders' Cup Handicap (1989); Hollywood Turf Handicap (1990); Caesars International Handicap (1990) Breeders' Cup wins: Breeders' Cup Mile (1989)
- Last updated on February 25, 2021

Steinlen (1983 – 9 June 2001) was a Thoroughbred racehorse grass champion male. He was voted the American Champion Male Turf Horse for 1989 following his win in that year's Breeders' Cup Mile.

He was bred in the name of Allez France Stables, a nom de course for owner Daniel Wildenstein. Steinlen was a stakes winner in France prior to being sent to compete in the United States. He was named for Théophile Steinlen, a Swiss-French painter. Under trainer D. Wayne Lukas Steinlen won the important Arlington Million and Bernard Baruch Handicap leading up to his victory in the November 4, 1989 Breeders' Cup Mile. He was retired with 20 wins from 45 starts and earnings of $3,297,169. He entered stud in 1996 at William S. Farish's Lane's End Farm near Paris, Kentucky and was moved to Harris Farms in Coalinga, California.

Steinlen was humanely euthanised at age 18 in June 2001 after fracturing a rear leg in a paddock accident at Harris Farms.

== At stud ==
Among his progeny, Steinlen was the sire of Alexis Federovna (GB), Cousin Joe(USA), Flammarion (USA), Madame Steinlen (GB), Miss Union Avenue (USA), Top Of Our Game (USA) and Sainte Addresse(USA).
