= Sir Gaylord =

American-bred Thoroughbred racehorse

- Sire: Turn-To
- Grandsire: Royal Charger
- Dam: Somethingroyal
- Damsire: Princequillo
- Sex: Stallion
- Foaled: 1959
- Country: United States
- Colour: Bay
- Breeder: Meadow Farm
- Owner: Meadow Stables
- Trainer: Casey Hayes
- Record: 18: 10-0-4
- Earnings: US$237,404

Major wins
- Sapling Stakes (1961); Great American Stakes (1961); National Stallion Stakes (1961); Tyro Stakes (1961); Stepping Stone Purse (1962); Everglades Stakes (1962); Bahamas Stakes (1962)

Sir Gaylord (February 12, 1959 – May 10, 1981) was an American Thoroughbred racehorse who later became a successful sire.

== Background ==
He was bred and raced by Christopher Chenery. Sir Gaylord was sired by the British-bred, American-raced Turn-To out of the mare Somethingroyal and was therefore the half-brother of Secretariat.

== Racing career ==
One of the leading two-year-old colts of 1961, Sir Gaylord was the favorite going into the 1962 Kentucky Derby. Shortly before the Derby, on May 4, he suffered a hairline fracture of the sesamoid bone in his right foreleg during a workout which ended his racing career.

== Stud career ==
Sir Gaylord was successful as a sire. He stood at stud in the United States until 1972, when he was sent to Haras du Quesnay (France). His best-known progeny included:

- Sir Ivor (1965) – 1968 Epsom Derby winner and champion broodmare sire. Sir Ivor was the sire of Sir Tristram a champion sire in Australia and New Zealand, as was his son Zabeel.
- Habitat (1966), a top-level stakes winner in England and France and also a successful sire.

He died in France of kidney failure on May 10, 1981, aged 22.

== Pedigree ==
Pedigree of Sir Gaylord
Sire Turn-To	Royal Charger	Nearco	Pharos
Sire Turn-To	Royal Charger	Nearco	Nogara
Sire Turn-To	Royal Charger	Sun Princess	Solario
Sire Turn-To	Royal Charger	Sun Princess	Mumtaz Begum
Sire Turn-To	Source Sucree	Admiral Drake	Craig an Eran
Sire Turn-To	Source Sucree	Admiral Drake	Plucky Liege
Sire Turn-To	Source Sucree	Lavendula	Pharos
Sire Turn-To	Source Sucree	Lavendula	Sweet Lavender
Dam Somethingroyal	Princequillo	Prince Rose	Rose Prince
Dam Somethingroyal	Princequillo	Prince Rose	Indolence
Dam Somethingroyal	Princequillo	Cosquilla	Papyrus
Dam Somethingroyal	Princequillo	Cosquilla	Quick Thought
Dam Somethingroyal	Imperatrice	Caruso	Polymelian
Dam Somethingroyal	Imperatrice	Caruso	Sweet Music
Dam Somethingroyal	Imperatrice	Cinqpace	Brown Bud
Dam Somethingroyal	Imperatrice	Cinqpace	Assignation
