= Somethingroyal =

American-bred Thoroughbred racehorse

- Sire: Princequillo
- Grandsire: Prince Rose
- Dam: Imperatrice
- Damsire: Caruso
- Sex: Mare
- Foaled: March 12, 1952
- Country: United States
- Color: Bay
- Breeder: Christopher Chenery
- Owner: Christopher Chenery
- Record: 1: 0-0-0
- Earnings: $0

Honours
- Kentucky Broodmare of the Year 1973
- Last updated on July 15, 2011

Somethingroyal (March 12, 1952 – June 9, 1983) was an American Thoroughbred racehorse best known as the dam of the 1973 U.S. Triple Crown champion and Hall of Fame inductee Secretariat. She also produced three other stakes winners and was named the 1973 Kentucky Broodmare of the Year.

== Background ==
Somethingroyal was bred in Virginia by her owner Christopher Chenery's Meadow Stud. Her sire was Princequillo, an Irish-bred horse who originally had a reputation as a "plodder" because his major victories came in long distance races. Princequillo soon proved himself an outstanding sire, known for transmitting his stamina. Somethingroyal's dam Imperatrice was a stakes winning mare who was bought by Chenery at a dispersal sale in 1947 for $30,000. Imperatrice was the dam of six stakes winners but is now best known for producing Somethingroyal, who raced only once, finishing unplaced.

== Broodmare career ==
Somethingroyal was named the 1973 Kentucky Broodmare of the Year when at age 18 she became the oldest mare to foal an American Triple Crown winner, Secretariat.

After they were retired to stud at Claiborne Farm, Somethingroyal was bred in 1975 to her former stablemate Riva Ridge which produced Straight Flush, one of her most important foals besides his half-brother, Secretariat, and his sire Riva Ridge. Out of Riva Ridge's 360 named foals, 228 were winners, including 29 stakes winners. Besides Secretariat, one of Somethingroyal’s most important foals included Straight Flush (1975) sired by Riva Ridge. Through his dam, Riva Ridge is descended from Man o' War.

She had already established herself as a "blue hen", having produced several stakes-winning and stakes-placed horses. Her most important foals included:

- Cherryville (foaled in 1958) – sired by Correspondent. Was stakes-placed and became a successful producer
- Sir Gaylord (1959) – by Turn-To. Won six stakes races and later became an excellent sire, whose offspring include Sir Ivor
- Mostar (1961) – by Double Jay. Stakes-placed
- First Family (1962) – by First Landing. Stakes winner
- Swansea (1963) – by Turn-to. Winless but became a successful producer
- Grand Coulee (1964) – by First Landing. Stakes-placed and producer
- Syrian Sea (1965) – by Bold Ruler. Multiple stakes winner and successful producer
- The Bride (1969) – by Bold Ruler. Winless but became a successful producer
- Secretariat (1970) – by Bold Ruler. Triple Crown winner, Hall of Fame inductee, good sire and leading broodmare sire, Wheatley Stable bred the mare Somethingroyal to his sire Bold Ruler at Claiborne Farm near Paris, Kentucky in 1969.
- Somethingfabulous (1972) – by Northern Dancer. Grade I-placed and good regional sire
- Straight Flush (1975) - by Riva Ridge. Race winner and sire.
- Queen's Colours (1976) – by Reviewer. Winless but became a successful producer

Somethingroyal produced 18 named foals, 15 of which started and 11 of which won. She was pensioned from broodmare duty in 1978 and died in 1983 at the age of 31. Due to her calm disposition, as a pensioner was used as a babysitter for new mares coming off the track.

As both Secretariat and Sir Gaylord were successful sires, inbreeding to Somethingroyal became fairly common in later generations. Weekend Surprise, the 1992 Kentucky Broodmare of the Year and dam of leading sire A.P. Indy, is an example of such inbreeding. Somethingroyal is one of the key influences tracked by the Rasmussen Factor, a Thoroughbred breeding theory that measures inbreeding to superior producers.

== Pedigree ==
Pedigree of Somethingroyal, bay mare, 1952
Sire *Princequillo 1940	Prince Rose (GB); 1928	Rose Prince (FR)	*Prince Palatine
Sire *Princequillo 1940	Prince Rose (GB); 1928	Rose Prince (FR)	Eglantine (FR)
Sire *Princequillo 1940	Prince Rose (GB); 1928	Indolence (GB)	Gay Crusader (GB)
Sire *Princequillo 1940	Prince Rose (GB); 1928	Indolence (GB)	Barrier (GB)
Sire *Princequillo 1940	*Cosquilla; 1933	*Papyrus	Tracery
Sire *Princequillo 1940	*Cosquilla; 1933	*Papyrus	Miss Matty (GB)
Sire *Princequillo 1940	*Cosquilla; 1933	Quick Thought (GB)	White Eagle (GB)
Sire *Princequillo 1940	*Cosquilla; 1933	Quick Thought (GB)	Mindful (GB)
Dam Imperatrice 1938	Caruso; 1927	*Polymelian	Polymelus (GB)
Dam Imperatrice 1938	Caruso; 1927	*Polymelian	*Pasquita
Dam Imperatrice 1938	Caruso; 1927	Sweet Music	Harmonicon
Dam Imperatrice 1938	Caruso; 1927	Sweet Music	*Isette
Dam Imperatrice 1938	Cinquepace; 1934	Brown Bud	*Brown Prince II
Dam Imperatrice 1938	Cinquepace; 1934	Brown Bud	June Rose
Dam Imperatrice 1938	Cinquepace; 1934	Assignation	*Teddy
Dam Imperatrice 1938	Cinquepace; 1934	Assignation	Cinq a Sept (family: 2-s)
