= Turn-To =

British-bred Thoroughbred racehorse

Turn-to
- Sire: Royal Charger
- Grandsire: Nearco
- Dam: Source Sucree
- Damsire: Admiral Drake
- Sex: Stallion
- Foaled: 1951
- Died: 1973 (aged 21–22)
- Country: Great Britain
- Colour: Bay
- Breeder: Maj. E. R. Miville & Mrs. G. L. Hastings
- Owner: Cain Hoy Stable
- Trainer: Eddie Hayward
- Record: 8:6–1–1
- Earnings: $280,032

Major wins
- Garden State Futurity (1953); Saratoga Special Stakes (1953); Flamingo Stakes (1954)
- Last updated on October 10, 2007

Turn-to (1951–June 15, 1973) was a British-born, American-trained Thoroughbred racehorse and sire.

== Background ==
He was sired by the British stallion Royal Charger, out of the French mare Source Sucree, whose sire, Admiral Drake, was third on the French sire list in 1949.

Imported to the United States of America as a yearling, Turn-to was bought at the Keeneland Sales for $20,000 (equivalent to $240,000 in 2025) to race for Capt. Harry F. Guggenheim's Cain Hoy Stable.

== Racing career ==
As a two-year-old with Henry Moreno aboard, Turn-to won the Garden State Futurity and the Saratoga Special. He also won the Flamingo Stakes at three.

== Retirement ==
Upon retirement, Turn-to initially stood at stud at Claiborne Farm before being moved to Spendthrift Farm after a disagreement between Guggenheim and Arthur B. Hancock.

His influence as a sire was demonstrated through the success of his progeny, many of whom became leading racehorses and important breeding stallions. Among his most notable offspring were First Landing, winner of the Belmont Stakes and later a successful sire; Hail To Reason, the U.S. Champion Two-Year-Old Colt of 1960 and an exceptionally influential stallion whose descendants have had a lasting impact on Thoroughbred breeding worldwide; Best Turn, a multiple stakes winner who also became a successful sire; and Sir Gaylord, a leading racehorse and sire best known as the sire of Sir Ivor and as a half-brother to Secretariat (both being out of the mare Somethingroyal). Through these and many other offspring, he established one of the most influential sire lines in modern Thoroughbred history.

Turn-to died on June 15, 1973, and is buried at Green Gates Farm, which is now part of Spendthrift Farm near Lexington, Kentucky. He was euthanized due to intestinal complications.

== Pedigree ==
Pedigree of Turn-to (GB), bay stallion, 1951
Sire Royal Charger (GB) 1942	Nearco (ITY); 1935	Pharos	Phalaris
Sire Royal Charger (GB) 1942	Nearco (ITY); 1935	Pharos	Scapa Flow
Sire Royal Charger (GB) 1942	Nearco (ITY); 1935	Nogara	Havresac
Sire Royal Charger (GB) 1942	Nearco (ITY); 1935	Nogara	Catnip
Sire Royal Charger (GB) 1942	Sun Princess (GB); 1937	Solario	Gainsborough
Sire Royal Charger (GB) 1942	Sun Princess (GB); 1937	Solario	Sun Worship
Sire Royal Charger (GB) 1942	Sun Princess (GB); 1937	Mumtaz Begum	Blenheim
Sire Royal Charger (GB) 1942	Sun Princess (GB); 1937	Mumtaz Begum	Mumtaz Mahal
Dam Source Sucree (FR) 1940	Admiral Drake (FR); 1931	Craig an Eran	Sunstar
Dam Source Sucree (FR) 1940	Admiral Drake (FR); 1931	Craig an Eran	Maid of the Mist
Dam Source Sucree (FR) 1940	Admiral Drake (FR); 1931	Plucky Liege	Spearmint
Dam Source Sucree (FR) 1940	Admiral Drake (FR); 1931	Plucky Liege	Concertina
Dam Source Sucree (FR) 1940	Lavendula (FR); 1930	Pharos	Phalaris
Dam Source Sucree (FR) 1940	Lavendula (FR); 1930	Pharos	Scapa Flow
Dam Source Sucree (FR) 1940	Lavendula (FR); 1930	Sweet Lavender	Swynford
Dam Source Sucree (FR) 1940	Lavendula (FR); 1930	Sweet Lavender	Marchetta (Family:1-w)
