= Leading broodmare sire in Great Britain and Ireland =

The list below shows the leading sire of broodmares in Great Britain and Ireland for each year since 1899. This is determined by the amount of prize money won during the year in Great Britain and Ireland by racehorses that were foaled by a daughter of the sire in question.

- 1899 – Galopin (1)
- 1900 – Hampton (1)
- 1901 – Bend Or (1)
- 1902 – Bend Or (2)
- 1903 – St. Simon (1)
- 1904 – St. Simon (2)
- 1905 – St. Simon (3)
- 1906 – St. Simon (4)
- 1907 – St. Simon (5)
- 1908 – Gallinule (1)
- 1909 – Galopin (2)
- 1910 – Galopin (3)
- 1911 – Gallinule (2)
- 1912 – Isinglass (1)
- 1913 – Gallinule (3)
- 1914 – Persimmon (1)
- 1915 – Persimmon (2)
- 1916 – St. Simon (6)
- 1917 – Beppo (1)
- 1918 – Gallinule (4)
- 1919 – Persimmon (3)
- 1920 – Gallinule (5)
- 1921 – Cyllene (1)
- 1922 – William the Third (1)
- 1923 – Sundridge (1)
- 1924 – St. Frusquin (1)
- 1925 – Bayardo (1)
- 1926 – Tredennis (1)
- 1927 – Chaucer (1)
- 1928 – Farasi (1)
- 1929 – Farasi (2)
- 1930 – Sunstar (1)
- 1931 – Gainsborough (1)
- 1932 – Swynford (1)
- 1933 – Chaucer (2)
- 1934 – By George (1)
- 1935 – Friar Marcus (1)
- 1936 – Buchan (1)
- 1937 – Phalaris (1)
- 1938 – Hurry On (1)
- 1939 – Stefan the Great (1)
- 1940 – Buchan (2)
- 1941 – Phalaris (2)
- 1942 – Phalaris (3)
- 1943 – Solario (1)
- 1944 – Hurry On (2)
- 1945 – Hurry On (3)
- 1946 – Fairway (1)
- 1947 – Fairway (2)
- 1948 – Hyperion (1)
- 1949 – Solario (2)
- 1950 – Solario (3)
- 1951 – Fair Trial (1)
- 1952 – Nearco (1)
- 1953 – Donatello II (1)
- 1954 – Blue Peter (1)
- 1955 – Nearco (2)
- 1956 – Nearco (3)
- 1957 – Hyperion (2)
- 1958 – Mieuxce (1)
- 1959 – Bois Roussel (1)
- 1960 – Bois Roussel (2)
- 1961 – Big Game (1)
- 1962 – Big Game (2)
- 1963 – Ambiorix (1)
- 1964 – Arctic Prince (1)
- 1965 – Tom Fool (1)
- 1966 – Big Game (3)
- 1967 – Hyperion (3)
- 1968 – Hyperion (4)
- 1969 – Arctic Prince (2)
- 1970 – Bull Page (1)
- 1971 – Princequillo (1)
- 1972 – Prince Chevalier (1)
- 1973 – Honeys Alibi (1)
- 1974 – Crepello (1)
- 1975 – Worden (1)
- 1976 – Worden (2)
- 1977 – Victoria Park (1)
- 1978 – Hardicanute (1)
- 1979 – Hornbeam (1)
- 1980 – High Hat (1)
- 1981 – Val de Loir (1)
- 1982 – Vaguely Noble (1)
- 1983 – Sir Ivor (1)
- 1984 – Bold Reason (1)
- 1985 – Graustark (1)
- 1986 – Thatch (1)
- 1987 – Habitat (1)
- 1988 – Blushing Groom (1)
- 1989 – Bustino (1)
- 1990 – High Top (1)
- 1991 – Master Derby (1)
- 1992 – Northfields (1)
- 1993 – High Top (2)
- 1994 – Habitat (2)
- 1995 – Blushing Groom (2)
- 1996 – Habitat (3)
- 1997 – Nureyev (1)
- 1998 – High Line (1)
- 1999 – Miswaki (1)
- 2000 – Rahy (1)
- 2001 – Miswaki (2)
- 2002 – Darshaan (1)
- 2003 – Rainbow Quest (1)
- 2004 – Rainbow Quest (2)
- 2005 – Sadler's Wells (1)
- 2006 – Sadler's Wells (2)
- 2007 – Sadler's Wells (3)
- 2008 – Sadler's Wells (4)
- 2009 – Sadler's Wells (5)
- 2010 – Sadler's Wells (6)
- 2011 – Sadler's Wells (7)
- 2012 – Danehill (1)
- 2013 – Darshaan (2)
- 2014 – Danehill (2)
- 2015 – Danehill (3)
- 2016 – Danehill Dancer (1)
- 2017 – Pivotal (1)
- 2018 – Pivotal (2)
- 2019 – Pivotal (3)
- 2020 – Galileo (1)
- 2021 – Galileo (2)
- 2022 – Galileo (3)

== See also ==
- Leading sire in Australia
- Leading sire in France
- Leading sire in Germany
- Leading sire in Great Britain and Ireland
- Leading sire in Japan
- Leading broodmare sire in Japan
- Leading sire in North America
- Leading broodmare sire in North America
