= Royal Charger =

British-bred Thoroughbred racehorse

- Sire: Nearco
- Grandsire: Pharos
- Dam: Sun Princess
- Damsire: Solario
- Sex: Stallion
- Foaled: 1942
- Died: 1961 (aged 18–19)
- Country: Great Britain
- Colour: Chestnut
- Breeder: Sir John Jarvis
- Owner: Sir John Jarvis; Irish National Stud (1946 at stud); George D. Widener Jr. (1953 at stud)
- Trainer: Jack Jarvis
- Record: 20: 6-7-2
- Earnings: £5,057

Major wins
- Challenge Stakes (1945); Queen Anne Stakes (1946); Ayr Gold Cup (1946)
- Last updated on 23 November 2006

Royal Charger (1942–26 November 1961) was a British Thoroughbred that was successful as a racehorse, but much more important as a sire.

== Background ==
Royal Charger was a chestnut horse sired by the important stallion Nearco. His dam, Sun Princess, was a descendant of the famous broodmare Mumtaz Mahal. He was owned by Sir John Jarvis and trained by his unrelated namesake Jack Jarvis at Newmarket, Suffolk.

== Racing career ==
Royal Charger failed to win as a two-year-old in 1944, but showed some promise when twice finishing second. As a three-year-old, he finished third in the 2000 Guineas at Newmarket on 9 May, beaten a neck and two lengths by Court Martial and Dante. Later that year, he was placed in the Duke of York Stakes and won the Challenge Stakes.

As a four-year-old, Royal Charger won the Queen Anne Stakes at Royal Ascot and the Ayr Gold Cup (carrying 133 pounds).

== Stud career ==
Retired after his four-year-old racing season in 1946, Royal Charger was sold to the Irish National Stud for £52,000. There, he sired a number of important horses before being purchased in 1953 by American George D. Widener Jr., who brought him to stand at his Old Kenney Farm (now Green Gates Farm) in Lexington, Kentucky. A three-quarters brother to the important sire Nasrullah, which also was brought to Kentucky from England, Royal Charger sired more than 55 stakes winners. Among his Irish progeny was Turn-To, which also was sent to the U.S., where he was the leading juvenile sire in 1958, notably through his colt First Landing. Other offspring included:

- Copenhagen, four-time leading sire in New Zealand
- Happy Laughter, winner of the 1953 1000 Guineas
- Gilles de Retz, winner of the 1956 2000 Guineas
- Idun, 1957 U.S. Champion two-year-old filly and the 1958 U.S. Champion three-year-old filly
- Mongo, the 1963 U.S. Champion Male Turf Horse
- Royal Duchy, Phoenix Stakes, Lowther Stakes
- Royal Native, the 1959 U.S. Champion three-year-old filly, 1960 U.S. Champion Handicap Mare
- Royal Orbit, Preakness Stakes
- Royal Palm, Nunthorpe Stakes
- Royal Serenade, Nunthorpe Stakes, Hollywood Gold Cup
- Sea Charger, Irish 2000 Guineas, Irish St Leger

In addition, Royal Charger was an important broodmare sire of more than 70 stakes winners, including Crowned Prince, the 1971 Champion two-year-old colt in England; the 1969 U.S. Champion two-year-old filly, Tudor Queen; and U.S. Hall of Famer Majestic Prince.

Royal Charger died in November 1961 and was buried at Old Kenney Farm in Lexington.

== Pedigree ==
Pedigree of Royal Charger
| Sire Nearco | Pharos | Phalaris | Polymelus |
| Sire Nearco | Pharos | Phalaris | Bromus |
| Sire Nearco | Pharos | Scapa Flow | Chaucer |
| Sire Nearco | Pharos | Scapa Flow | Anchora |
| Sire Nearco | Nogara | Havresac | Rabelais |
| Sire Nearco | Nogara | Havresac | Hors Concours |
| Sire Nearco | Nogara | Catnip | Spearmint |
| Sire Nearco | Nogara | Catnip | Sibola |
| Dam Sun Princess | Solario | Gainsborough | Bayardo |
| Dam Sun Princess | Solario | Gainsborough | Rosedrop |
| Dam Sun Princess | Solario | Sun Worship | Sundridge |
| Dam Sun Princess | Solario | Sun Worship | Doctrine |
| Dam Sun Princess | Mumtaz Begum | Blenheim | Blandford |
| Dam Sun Princess | Mumtaz Begum | Blenheim | Malva |
| Dam Sun Princess | Mumtaz Begum | Mumtaz Mahal | The Tetrarch |
| Dam Sun Princess | Mumtaz Begum | Mumtaz Mahal | Lady Josephine |
