= Kilijaro =

Irish-bred Thoroughbred racehorse

- Sire: African Sky
- Grandsire: Sing Sing
- Dam: Manfilia
- Damsire: Mandamus
- Sex: Mare
- Foaled: 8 February 1976
- Country: Ireland
- Colour: Bay
- Breeder: Irish National Stud
- Owner: John Mulcahy; N. Robinson; Serge Fradkoff; Edward Seltzer
- Trainer: Dermot Weld; Olivier Douieb; Charles E. Whittingham
- Record: 37: 14-5-5

Major wins
- Phoenix Stakes (1978); Prix de Meautry (1980); Prix Quincey (1980); Prix du Moulin (1980); Prix de Seine-et-Oise (1980); Yellow Ribbon Stakes (1980); San Gorgonio Handicap (1981); Monrovia Handicap (1981); Gamely Handicap (1981); Palomar Handicap (1981); Autumn Days Handicap (1981); Matriarch Stakes (1981)

Awards
- Timeform rating 121 (1978), 124 (1979), 126 (1980); Top-rated Irish two-year-old filly (1978); Top-rated Irish three-year-old filly (1979)

Kilijaro (8 February 1976 – after 1990) was an Irish-bred Thoroughbred racehorse and broodmare. She was the best filly of her generation in Ireland at both two and three years of age, winning the Phoenix Stakes and finishing second in the Queen Mary Stakes, Cheveley Park Stakes, Prix de l'Abbaye and Prix de la Forêt. When transferred to France in 1980 she proved herself one of the best sprinter-milers of the year, with consecutive wins in the Prix de Meautry, Prix Quincey, Prix du Moulin and Prix de Seine-et-Oise before traveling to California to take the Yellow Ribbon Stakes. She remained in the United Stakes in 1981 and was one of the most successful female turf performers of 1981, winning the San Gorgonio Handicap, Monrovia Handicap, Gamely Handicap, Palomar Handicap, Autumn Days Handicap and Matriarch Stakes. After her retirement from racing she made little impact as a broodmare, but some of her descendants have won good races in Australia.

== Background ==
Kilijaro was a bay mare with a white star and a white sock on her right front foot bred in Ireland by the Irish National Stud. She was sired by African Sky who won the Prix du Palais Royal, Prix Quincey and Prix de la Forêt as a three-year-old in 1973. As a breeding stallion, he also sired the King's Stand Stakes winner African Song. She was the second foal of her dam Manfilia, who had some success as a racemare, winning five races.

Sold as a yearling for 4,200 guineas, the filly was sent into training with Dermot Weld at the Curragh, County Kildare. She was ridden in most of her early races by Wally Swinburn.

== Racing career ==
=== 1978: two-year-old season ===
Kilijaro began her racing career in five furlong maiden race in the spring of 1978, finishing unplaced at Phoenix Park Racecourse and third at Navan Racecourse before winning at Phoenix Park. In June she was sent to England to contest the Queen Mary Stakes at Royal Ascot. Starting at odds of 12/1 she produced a strong run along the rail to dispute the lead in the final furlong and finished second, beaten a head by Greenland Park, with Devon Ditty in third. After a break of almost two months the filly was matched against colts in the Group 2 Phoenix Stakes in which she was equipped with blinkers for the first time. Starting second favourite behind the English-trained Inshallah, she raced at the rear of the nine-runner field before moving up to take the lead a furlong from the finish. In the closing stages she drew away from her opponents to win by six lengths and half a length from Real Snug and Coalminer. In October Kilijaro was sent back to England for a rematch with Devon Ditty in the Cheveley Park Stakes in which she was moved up to six furlongs for the first time. She moved up to challenge Devon Ditty approaching the final furlong but after a prolonged struggle she was beat a neck by the 11/8 favourite.

=== 1979: three-year-old season ===
Kilijaro failed to win in seven starts as a three-year-old but produced several good performances. After finishing sixth on her debut she started second favourite for the Irish 1000 Guineas over one mile at the Curragh, but finished eleventh of the twelve runners behind the Vincent O'Brien-trained Godetia. The filly was then brought back to sprint distances and finished fifth in her next appearance before producing her best performance of the year up to that point when she finished third to the colts Miami Springs and Golden Thatch in the Matt Gallagher Sprint Stakes in July at Phoenix Park.

After finishing unplaced in her next race, Kilijaro was offered for sale in October at the Arc de Triomphe sale. She was bought for ₣1,800,000 by representatives of Serge Fradkoff and transferred to the French stable of Olivier Douieb. Less than twenty-four hours after the sale, Kilijaro contested France's most prestigious sprint race, the Prix de l'Abbaye over 1000 metres at Longchamp Racecourse. Starting a 73/1 outsider she produced what was then a career-best performance, producing a sustained run over the last 400 metres to finish second by a head to the British four-year-old Double Form. Greenland Park was third, with the other beaten horses including King of Macedon, Thatching and Sigy. Three weeks later the filly was ridden by Henry Samani in the Group One Prix de la Forêt over 1400 metres at the same course and finished second of the fourteen runners behind Producer.

=== 1980: four-year-old season ===
After winning a minor race over 1400 metres at Évry Racecourse in April, Kilijaro was beaten in her next five races: she finished sixth to Adraan when favourite for the Prix de Saint-Georges, second to Baptism in the Prix du Palais-Royal, fifth behind Rostov in the Prix du Chemin de Fer du Nord, fourth to Luck of the Draw in the Prix de la Porte Maillot and third behind Boitron and Moorestyle in the Prix Maurice de Gheest.

Despite having lost thirteen of her last fourteen races, Kilijaro was made 3/5 favourite for the Prix de Meautry over 1200 metres at Deauville Racecourse on 20 August. Ridden by Alain Lequeux, she recorded her first major win for more than two years as she won easily by five lengths from Northjet. Eight days later the same course, the filly started at odds of 11/1 for the Prix Quincey over 1600 metres. Ridden by Freddy Head, she won by three lengths from the favourite Tassmoun (winner of the Prix Messidor) with Boitron in fourth. On 7 September, Kilijaro was moved back up to Group One class for the Prix du Moulin over 1600 metres at Longchamp. She started the 6.1/1 fourth choice in the betting behind Northern Baby, Nadjar (Prix d'Ispahan, Prix Jacques Le Marois) and Final Straw (Champagne Stakes). Under a very hard ride from Head, she held off a strong challenge from Nadjar to prevail by a neck, with a gap of two lengths back to Katowice in third. Kilijaro attempted to win her fourth major race in less than five weeks when she started 3/5 favourite for the Prix de Seine-et-Oise at Maisons-Laffitte Racecourse on 22 September. Ridden by Lequeux, she won by one and a half lengths and a length from Boitron and Northjet. On her final European start, Kilijaro finished third behind Moorestyle and Crofter in the Group One Prix de la Forêt over 1400 metres on heavy ground at Longchamp on 26 October.

Following her defeat in the Foret, Kilijaro was sent to California to contest the Grade I Yellow Ribbon Stakes at Santa Anita Park on 9 November. Despite given little time to aclimatise to her new surroundings and racing over an unfamiliar distance of ten furlongs, Kilijaro accelerated away from her opponents in the closing stages to win by more than three lengths from Ack's Secret (Las Palmas Handicap) and Queen To Conquer (Ramona Handicap).

=== 1981: five-year-old season ===
In 1981, Kilijaro was trained in the United States by Charles E. Whittingham and was ridden in most of her races by Marco Castaneda. She began her fourth season in the Grade II San Gorgonio Handicap over nine furlongs at Santa Anita on January 11 and won from Queen To Conquer before being switched to dirt on for the Santa Margarita Invitational Handicap on February 22 and finished sixth behind Princess Karenda. On her next appearance she was dropped back to sprint distances for the Monrovia Handicap on turf and won from Love You Dear and She Can't Miss. The mare was then sent to Hollywood Park Racetrack for the Gamely Handicap oven nine furlongs on April 24 and won again, beating Princess Karenda and Wishing Well (winner of the race in 1980). She was matched against male opposition in the Californian Stakes on dirt on May 25 and finished to behind Eleven Stitches and Temperence Hill, before finishing seventh behind Eleven Stitches in the Hollywood Gold Cup on June 14. In the Vanity Invitational Handicap on July 12 she finished fourth behind Track Robbery, Princess Karenda and Save Wild Life.

On August 8, Kilijaro returned to turf racing for the Grade II Palomar Handicap over one mile at Del Mar Racetrack and won from Lisawan and Satin Ribera. On August 30, Kilijaro contested the inaugural running of the Arlington Million, then the world's most valuable horse race, but finished unplaced behind John Henry The mare returned to California for her last three races. In the Autumn Day Handicap over six and a half furlongs on turf, she recorded her fifth success of the season, beating Ack's Secret and Miss Huntingdon. On November 1 she attempted to repeat her 1980 win in the Yellow Ribbon Stakes, but finished fourth behind Queen To Conquer, Star Pastured and Ack's Secret. On November 22, Kilijaro contested the inaugural running of the Matriarch Stakes over nine furlongs at Hollywood Park. Ridden by Laffit Pincay Jr., she ended her career with a victory as she won by two and a half lengths from the Canadian champion Glorious Song.

== Assessment and awards ==
In the International Classification for 1978, Kilijaro was rated on 82, making her the sixth-best juvenile filly in Europe behind Sigy, Devon Ditty, Formulate, Greenland Park and Pitasia. She was the top-rated filly in the Irish Free Handicap, three pounds ahead of Godetia. The independent Timeform organisation gave her a rating of 121, eleven pounds behind Sigy. In the following year Timeform rated her on 124, nine pounds behind their best three-year-old filly Three Troikas. In the official Irish Handicap, she was rated level with Godetia as the best three-year-old filly. The International Classification rated her the eighth-best filly of her generation in Europe. Kilijaro received her best Timeform rating of 126 in 1980, placing her only two pounds behind the top-rated older female Three Troikas. In the International Classification she was rated the third-best older female in Europe behind Three Troikas and Dunette.

== Breeding record ==
Kilijaro produced at least five foal and one winner between 1983 and 1990:

- Face Nord, brown filly, foaled in 1983, sired by Northjet. Unraced.
- Shamayil, grey filly, 1984, by Spectacular Bid. Failed to win in seven races, dam of The Thousand Guineas winner Shame.
- Kahaley, colt, 1985, by Caro.Unraced.
- Cossack Guard, brown colt, 1986 Nureyev. Won once from sixteen races.
- Sky Safari Too, brown filly, 1990 Skywalker. Unraced.

== Pedigree ==
Pedigree of Kilijaro, bay mare, 1976
Sire African Sky (GB) 1970	Sing Sing (GB); 1957	Tudor Minstrel	Owen Tudor
Sire African Sky (GB) 1970	Sing Sing (GB); 1957	Tudor Minstrel	Sansonnet
Sire African Sky (GB) 1970	Sing Sing (GB); 1957	Agin the Law	Portlaw
Sire African Sky (GB) 1970	Sing Sing (GB); 1957	Agin the Law	Revolte
Sire African Sky (GB) 1970	Sweet Caroline (GB); 1954	Nimbus	Nearco
Sire African Sky (GB) 1970	Sweet Caroline (GB); 1954	Nimbus	Kong
Sire African Sky (GB) 1970	Sweet Caroline (GB); 1954	Lackaday	Bobsleigh
Sire African Sky (GB) 1970	Sweet Caroline (GB); 1954	Lackaday	Lackadaisy
Dam Manfilia (GB) 1968	Mandamus (GB); 1960	Petition	Fair Trial
Dam Manfilia (GB) 1968	Mandamus (GB); 1960	Petition	Art Paper
Dam Manfilia (GB) 1968	Mandamus (GB); 1960	Great Fun	Big Game
Dam Manfilia (GB) 1968	Mandamus (GB); 1960	Great Fun	Merry Devon
Dam Manfilia (GB) 1968	Spare Filly (GB); 1961	Beau Sabreur	His Highness
Dam Manfilia (GB) 1968	Spare Filly (GB); 1961	Beau Sabreur	Mashaq
Dam Manfilia (GB) 1968	Spare Filly (GB); 1961	La Pucelle	Prince Chevalier
Dam Manfilia (GB) 1968	Spare Filly (GB); 1961	La Pucelle	Dainty Miss (Family: 11-e)
