= Devon Ditty =

British-bred Thoroughbred racehorse

- Sire: Song
- Grandsire: Sing Sing
- Dam: Devon Night
- Damsire: Midsummer Night
- Sex: Mare
- Foaled: 8 May 1976
- Country: United Kingdom
- Colour: Chestnut
- Breeder: Littleton Stud
- Owner: Sir Edwin McAlpine; Robert Sangster
- Trainer: Harry Thomson Jones; John Gosden
- Record: 24: 11-3-4

Major wins
- Cherry Hinton Stakes (1978); Princess Margaret Stakes (1978); Lowther Stakes (1978); Flying Childers Stakes (1978); Cheveley Park Stakes (1978)

Awards
- Timeform rating 122 (1978); Top-rated British two-year-old filly (1978)

Devon Ditty (8 May 1976 – 1999) was a British Thoroughbred racehorse and broodmare. In a racing career which lasted from April 1978 until August 1980, she won eleven of her twenty-four races, finished second three times and third on four occasions. As a two-year-old she won two minor races from her first four starts but then emerged as arguably the best British filly with five consecutive wins in the Cherry Hinton Stakes, Princess Margaret Stakes, Lowther Stakes, Flying Childers Stakes and Cheveley Park Stakes. At three she was mainly campaigned over sprint races: she won the Gus Demmy Stakes at Haydock Park and was placed in the Nell Gwyn Stakes, King George Stakes, Goldene Peitsche and Haydock Sprint Cup. In the following year she raced in California where she won three times from seven races. She later had some success as a broodmare, producing several minor winners.

== Background ==
Devon Ditty was a chestnut mare with a narrow white blaze and white socks on her hind legs bred in Hampshire by Bruce Deane's Littleton Stud. She was sired by Song, a sprinter whose wins included the New Stakes, Temple Stakes, King's Stand Stakes and Diadem Stakes. As a breeding stallion the best of his progeny included Lochsong, Chummy's Favourite (Diadem Stakes) and Sizzling Melody (Flying Childers Stakes). Her dam Devon Night won as a two-year-old in 1968 and was descended from Nairn, a half-sister of The Derby winner Cameronian.

As a yearling, Devon Ditty was offered for sale and bought for 7,800 guineas by Sir Edwin McAlpine. She was sent into training with Harry Thomson Jones at the Woodlands stable in Newmarket, Suffolk.

== Racing career ==
=== 1978: two-year-old season ===
Devon Ditty made her racecourse debut in a maiden race over five furlongs at Sandown Park Racecourse in April, and finished fifth, sixteen lengths behind the winner Carrie Red. She then won a minor race over the same distance at Pontefract at odds of 9/2 and then defeated Songorella by one and a half lengths in the Hilary Needler Trophy at Beverley Racecourse in May. In June she was stepped up in class for the Queen Mary Stakes at Royal Ascot in which she was ridden for the first time by Greville Starkey, who became her regular jockey. She finished strongly and took third place behind Greenland Park and Kilijaro.

In the Group Three Cherry Hinton Stakes at Newmarket Racecourse in July Devon Ditty started 15/8 favourite despite carrying top weight and racing over six furlongs for the first time. She was restrained by Starkey before producing a strong late run, taking the lead inside the final furlong and winning by a length from Mixed Applause. Eleven days later she added a win in the Princess Margaret Stakes at Ascot, easily beating Innini, Ring Lady and Strathspey at odds of 8/11. In the Group Two Lowther Stakes at York Racecourse in August, Devon Ditty faced a rematch with Greenland Park who, since the Queen Mary Stakes, had gone on to win the Molecomb Stakes at Goodwood. Given an unfavourable draw, Starkey settled the filly before tracking across to the inside rail and launching his challenge approaching the final furlong. Devon Ditty took the lead and won by one and a half lengths from Eyelet, with Greenland Park in third place.

Devon Ditty was dropped back in distance and matched against colts when she contested the Flying Childers Stakes (then a Group One race) over five furlongs at Doncaster Racecourse in September. Greenland Park was again in opposition but her biggest rival appeared to be Abdu, a colt who started favourite after seven previous wins over sprint distances. Starting the 2/1 second choice in the betting, the filly took the lead from Abdu in the closing stages and fought off a challenge from Greenland Park to win by three quarters of a length. Devon Ditty ended her season at Newmarket in October when she started 11/8 favourite for the Cheveley Park Stakes, then the only Group One race in Britain restricted to juvenile fillies. The best of her six opponents appeared to be the Irish-trained Kilijaro, who, since finishing in front of Devon Ditty at Royal Ascot, had won the Phoenix Stakes by six lengths. After being restrained by Starkey as Penny Blessing set the pace from Do Be Daring, the favourite produced her customary late run and got the better of a sustained struggle with Kilijaro to win by a neck. Do Be Daring and Penny Blessing held on for third and fourth.

=== 1979: three-year-old season ===
On her first appearance as a three-year-old, Devon Ditty was moved up in distance for the seven furlong Nell Gwyn Stakes, a major trial for the 1000 Guineas. She proved no match for the Henry Cecil-trained One In A Million to whom she was attempting to concede seven pounds, and was beaten five lengths into second place. She was stepped up to a mile for the 1000 Guineas three weeks later and finished fifth of the seventeen runners behind One in a Million. After the race she was purchased for an undisclosed sum by Robert Sangster. On her first start for her new owner she was dropped back in distance for the Gus Demmy Stakes over six furlongs and recorded her only win of the season as she prevailed by a head from the colt Son of Shaka.

For the remainder of the season, Devon Ditty was campaigned in sprint races and failed to win, although she ran well in defeat on several occasions. She was unplaced behind Double Form in the King's Stand Stakes at Royal Ascot and then ran fourth behind Thatching, Vaigly Great and Greenland Park in the July Cup. At Goodwood she finished third to Ahonoora and Abdu in the King George Stakes, giving the impression that he found the five furlong trip inadequate. She was then sent to Germany for the Goldene Peitsche over 1200 metres at Baden-Baden and finished second to the locally trained Iron Ruler. On her final appearance in Europe she finished third to Double Form and Ahonoora in the Haydock Sprint Cup.

=== 1980: four-year-old season ===
For the 1980 season, Devon Ditty was transferred to California, where she was trained by John Gosden. On her American debut she finished sixth in an allowance race at Santa Anita Park in April and then won a similar event at Hollywood Park Racetrack on 1 May before finishing second to Country Queen in the Grade III Hawthorne Handicap at the same track three weeks later. In June the filly won an allowance at Hollywood and then recorded her biggest win in North America when winning the Brown Jade Stakes. In August she moved to Del Mar Racetrack where she finished third to A Thousand Stars in the Palomar Handicap and sixth behind Queen to Conquer in the Ramona Handicap.

== Assessment ==
In the inaugural International Classification for European two-year-olds, Devon Ditty was rated on 85, making her the sixth-best juvenile of either sex and the joint second-best filly, behind the French-trained Sigy and level with the Fillies' Mile winner Formulate. The independent Timeform organisation gave her a rating of 122, the highest for any British-trained two-year-old filly. In the following year she was rated 119 by Timeform, twelve pounds below their top sprinter Thatching. The International Classification gave her a rating of 80, making her the fifth-best filly trained in Britain behind Connaught Bridge, One in a Million, Greenland Park and Topsy.

== Breeding record ==
Devon Ditty was retired from racing to become a broodmare. All five of her known foals won races, although none of them were top-class performers:

- Devon Diva, a chestnut filly, foaled in 1982, sired by The Minstrel. Won one race. Dam of Grade I winner Tinners Way
- Ivybridge, chestnut colt, 1983, by Sir Ivor. Won two races.
- Tom Cobbley, bay colt, 1986, by Seattle Slew. Won eight races.
- Irish Ditty, chestnut colt (later gelded), 1987, by Irish River. Won two hurdle races.
- Transcript, chestnut colt, 1989, by Secretariat. Won one race in Switzerland.

Devon Ditty produced no foals after 1989 and was retired from breeding from 1993 until her death in 1999.

== Pedigree ==
Pedigree of Devon Ditty (GB), chestnut mare, 1976
| Sire Song (GB) 1966 | Sing Sing (GB); 1957 | Tudor Minstrel | Owen Tudor |
| Sire Song (GB) 1966 | Sing Sing (GB); 1957 | Tudor Minstrel | Sansonnet |
| Sire Song (GB) 1966 | Sing Sing (GB); 1957 | Agin the Law | Portlaw |
| Sire Song (GB) 1966 | Sing Sing (GB); 1957 | Agin the Law | Revolte |
| Sire Song (GB) 1966 | Intent (GB); 1952 | Vilmorin | Gold Bridge |
| Sire Song (GB) 1966 | Intent (GB); 1952 | Vilmorin | Queen of the Meadows |
| Sire Song (GB) 1966 | Intent (GB); 1952 | Under Canvas | Winterhalter |
| Sire Song (GB) 1966 | Intent (GB); 1952 | Under Canvas | Shelton |
| Dam Devon Night (GB) 1966 | Midsummer Night (USA); 1957 | Djeddah | Djebel |
| Dam Devon Night (GB) 1966 | Midsummer Night (USA); 1957 | Djeddah | Djezima |
| Dam Devon Night (GB) 1966 | Midsummer Night (USA); 1957 | Night Sound | Mahmoud |
| Dam Devon Night (GB) 1966 | Midsummer Night (USA); 1957 | Night Sound | Gala Flight |
| Dam Devon Night (GB) 1966 | Devon Violet (GB); 1953 | Devonian | Hyperion |
| Dam Devon Night (GB) 1966 | Devon Violet (GB); 1953 | Devonian | Glorious Devon |
| Dam Devon Night (GB) 1966 | Devon Violet (GB); 1953 | Elgin | Donatello |
| Dam Devon Night (GB) 1966 | Devon Violet (GB); 1953 | Elgin | Nairn (Family 1-t) |
