= African Song =

Irish-bred Thoroughbred racehorse

- Sire: African Sky
- Grandsire: Sing Sing
- Dam: Goldwyn Princess
- Damsire: Native Prince
- Sex: Stallion
- Foaled: 19 March 1977
- Country: Ireland
- Colour: Bay
- Breeder: W Moloney
- Owner: Geoffrey Kaye
- Trainer: Paul Kelleway
- Record: 5: 2-0-2

Major wins
- King's Stand Stakes (1980)

Awards
- Timeform rating 121 (1980)

African Song (19 March 1977 – after 1993) was an Irish-bred, British-trained Thoroughbred racehorse and sire. He was inexpensively bought as a yearling and had a brief racing career which comprised only five races in a four-month period in the spring and summer of 1980. After finishing third on his debut he won a minor race at Sandown before finishing third in the Duke of York Stakes. At Royal Ascot in June he recorded an emphatic victory in the Group One King's Stand Stakes but his career was then interrupted by injury and he finished last in his only subsequent race. He made little impact as a breeding stallion.

== Background ==
African Song was a dark-coated bay horse with a white star bred in Ireland by W Moloney. As a yearling he was sent to the October sales at Newmarket and was bought for 7,400 guineas. He entered the ownership of Geoffrey Kaye and was sent into training with Paul Kelleway at his Shalfleet stables on the Bury Road in Newmarket. Kelleway was a former National Hunt jockey who had great success as a trainer with cheaply-bought horses including Swiss Maid and Madam Gay

African Song was sired by African Sky who won the Prix du Palais Royal, Prix Quincey and Prix de la Forêt as a three-year-old in 1973. As a breeding stallion as the sire of the outstanding racemare Kilijaro. African Song's dam Goldwyn Princess was of little use as a racehorse, racing only as a two-year-old in 1972 and finishing well beaten in both of her races. She was a half-sister to Broadway Melody, the dam of the Prix Morny winner Broadway Dancer and a distant relative of the Prix de l'Arc de Triomphe winner Marienbard.

== Racing career ==
=== 1980: three-year-old season ===
African Song did not run as a two-year-old, making his racecourse debut in a six-furlong maiden race at Newmarket Racecourse in April. He was strongly backed in the betting market but finished third after weakening in the closing stages. He was then dropped to five furlongs for a maiden at Sandown Park Racecourse and won easily from twenty opponents after leading from the start. The colt was then stepped up in class and matched against older horses in the Group Three Duke of York Stakes over six furlongs at York Racecourse in May. He finished third behind his fellow three-year-old Flash N Thunder and the seven-year-old gelding Gypsy Dancer, beaten three lengths by the winner.

At Royal Ascot in June African Song was moved up to Group One level for the King's Stand Stakes run over five furlongs on good to firm ground. Ridden by Pat Eddery he started at odds of 10/1 in a fourteen-runner field. The best of his rivals appeared to be Abdu (runner-up in the William Hill Sprint Championship), Greenland Park (winner of the Queen Mary Stakes, Molecomb Stakes and Cornwallis Stakes), Runnett (later to win the Haydock Sprint Cup) and Abeer (Queen Mary Stakes, Flying Childers Stakes). Racing down the centre of the course African Song went to the front soon after the start and dominated the race, going clear of his rivals by half way and winning by one and a half lengths from Runnett with Abdu in third place.

African Song was scheduled to reappear in the King George Stakes at Goodwood Racecourse in July but went lame just before the start and was withdrawn from the race. In the William Hill Sprint Championship at York in August he started well but dropped away to finish tailed-off last behind Sharpo having sustained a pastern injury. In September it was announced that the colt had been retired from racing.

== Assessment ==
In 1980 the independent Timeform organisation gave African Song a rating of 121, sixteen pounds behind their best sprinter Moorestyle. In the official International Classification however, he was rated only eight pounds inferior to Moorestyle, who was the top-rated three-year-old in Europe,

== Stud record ==
African Song began his stud career at the Haras du Theil-en-Auge in Normandy, and later stood in Denmark. His last recorded foals were born in 1994.

== Pedigree ==
Pedigree of African Song (IRE), bay stallion, 1977
| Sire African Sky (GB) 1970 | Sing Sing (GB); 1957 | Tudor Minstrel | Owen Tudor |
| Sire African Sky (GB) 1970 | Sing Sing (GB); 1957 | Tudor Minstrel | Sansonnet |
| Sire African Sky (GB) 1970 | Sing Sing (GB); 1957 | Agin the Law | Portlaw |
| Sire African Sky (GB) 1970 | Sing Sing (GB); 1957 | Agin the Law | Revolte |
| Sire African Sky (GB) 1970 | Sweet Caroline (GB); 1954 | Nimbus | Nearco |
| Sire African Sky (GB) 1970 | Sweet Caroline (GB); 1954 | Nimbus | Kong |
| Sire African Sky (GB) 1970 | Sweet Caroline (GB); 1954 | Lackaday | Bobsleigh |
| Sire African Sky (GB) 1970 | Sweet Caroline (GB); 1954 | Lackaday | Lackadaisy |
| Dam Goldwyn Princess (GB) 1970 | Native Prince (USA); 1964 | Native Dancer | Polynesian |
| Dam Goldwyn Princess (GB) 1970 | Native Prince (USA); 1964 | Native Dancer | Geisha |
| Dam Goldwyn Princess (GB) 1970 | Native Prince (USA); 1964 | Sungari | Eight Thirty |
| Dam Goldwyn Princess (GB) 1970 | Native Prince (USA); 1964 | Sungari | Swabia |
| Dam Goldwyn Princess (GB) 1970 | Goldwyn Girl (GB); 1953 | Court Martial | Fair Trial |
| Dam Goldwyn Princess (GB) 1970 | Goldwyn Girl (GB); 1953 | Court Martial | Instantaneous |
| Dam Goldwyn Princess (GB) 1970 | Goldwyn Girl (GB); 1953 | Zolotaia | Gold Bridge |
| Dam Goldwyn Princess (GB) 1970 | Goldwyn Girl (GB); 1953 | Zolotaia | Thamar (Family: 12-g) |
