= Double Form =

Irish-bred Thoroughbred racehorse

- Sire: Habitat
- Grandsire: Sir Gaylord
- Dam: Fanghorn
- Damsire: Crocket
- Sex: Stallion
- Foaled: 14 February 1975
- Country: Ireland
- Colour: Bay
- Breeder: Baroness Thyssen
- Owner: Baroness Thyssen
- Trainer: Fulke Johnson Houghton
- Record: 19:7-4-5

Major wins
- Temple Stakes (1979); King's Stand Stakes (1979); Haydock Sprint Cup (1979); Prix de l'Abbaye (1979)

Awards
- Timeform rating 110p (1977), 123 (1978), 130 (1979); Gilbey Champion Sprinter (1979)

Double Form (14 February 1975 – 22 April 1983) was an Irish-bred British Thoroughbred racehorse and sire. A specialist sprinter, he showed promise as a two-year-old in 1977, and improved to become a high-class performer in 1978. He won only one race as a three-year-old but was placed in several major sprints. In 1979 he improved again to become the highest-rated sprinter in the United Kingdom, winning the Temple Stakes, King's Stand Stakes and Haydock Sprint Cup in England and the Prix de l'Abbaye in France. He was the first horse to win both the King's Stand Stakes and the Prix de l'Abbaye. He was retired to stud where he was an immediate success but died on 22 April 1983.

== Background ==
Double Form was a "big, strong, good-looking" bay horse with no white markings bred in Ireland by his owner Baroness Thyssen. He was sired by Habitat, an American-bred, British-raced miler who became one of the leading European stallions of the 1970s and 1980s. His other progeny included Habibti, Marwell, Rose Bowl, Flying Water, Homing and Sigy and he was the British Champion broodmare sire on three occasions. Double Form's dam, Fanghorn was placed in the Poule d'Essai des Pouliches and was also the dam of Gradiva, the ancestor of the Irish Derby winner Soldier of Fortune. Baroness Thyssen sent the colt into training with Fulke Johnson Houghton at Blewbury in Wiltshire. Double Form usually raced in blinkers

== Racing career ==
=== 1977: two-year-old season ===
Double Form began his racing career in the Granville Maiden Stakes over six furlongs at Ascot Racecourse in July. Ridden by Lester Piggott he was given an easy introduction and finished sixth of the fourteen runners behind Nutibara. The colt then suffered from a skin problem and did not appear again until October, when he ran in the Burr Stakes over seven and a half furlongs at Lingfield Park Racecourse in October. Starting favourite, he won comfortably from Whitstead, from whom he was receiving eight pounds.

=== 1978: three-year-old season ===
In the spring of 1978, Double Form was considered a classic contender, but after finishing third in the Greenham Stakes he was unplaced when tried over one mile in the 2000 Guineas. After the Guineas, Double Form was brought back to shorter distances. He won only one of his remaining eight races but established himself as a high-class sprinter. Double Form's sole victory came in May when he won the Great Eastern Handicap at Newmarket Racecourse, carrying a big weight to victory over six furlongs. He finished second to Persian Bold, when ridden by Lester Piggott in the Heron Stakes over seven furlongs on 3 June and then ran second in the Cork and Orrery Stakes at Royal Ascot, beaten half a length by the Irish filly Sweet Mint. In July he was moved up to Group One class and finished third behind Solinus and Sanedtki in the July Cup having looked a likely winner approaching the final furlong. In the Stewards' Cup at Goodwood Racecourse, Double Form was allotted a weight of 131 pounds an unusually high weight for a three-year-old and finished second to the 50/1 outsider Ahonoora, to whom he was conceding 19 pounds. In October he was sent to France for the Group One Prix de l'Abbaye over 1000 metres at Longchamp Racecourse. Ridden by John Reid he started the 29/1 outsider of the seven runner field but produced his best performance of the year to finish third, beaten three lengths and half a length by Sigy and Solinus. On his final appearance of the season he ran poorly when finishing unplaced behind Absalom in the Vernons Sprint Cup.

=== 1979: four-year-old season ===
Double Form began his third season with an easy win over six furlongs at Thirsk Racecourse and then finished second to Vaigly Great in the five furlong Palace House Stakes at Newmarket, beaten one and a half lengths. At Sandown in May, the colt recorded his first Group race success in the Temple Stakes, beating Ahonoora by a length, with the filly Greenland Park a length and a half away in third place. In June at Royal Ascot, Double Form was moved back up to Group One level for the King's Stand Stakes, in which he started at odds of 12/1 and ridden by John Reid. The field included Vaigly Great, Ahonoora, Golden Thatch (Ballyogan Stakes, Greenlands Stakes), Devon Ditty (Cheveley Park Stakes, Flying Childers Stakes) and King of Macedon (Prix Maurice de Gheest). The race was dominated from the start by Golden Thatch, Double Form and Ahonoora. When Golden Thatch weakened a furlong from the finish, Double Form went to the front and held off the persistent challenge of Ahonoora to win by three-quarters of a length.

Double Form was aimed at the July Cup over six furlongs at Newmarket, but was withdrawn after contracting a viral infection, and did not appear again until the William Hill Sprint Championship at York Racecourse in August. He appeared to be less than fully fit and finished fourth behind Thatching, Ahonoora and Abdu, but was promoted to third after the winner was disqualified for causing interference in the closing stages. In September, Double Form started at odds of 11/4 for the Vernons Sprint Cup and won by three lengths from Ahonoora. He was ridden in this race by the veteran Geoff Lewis, who had been persuaded by Fulke Johnson Houghton to postpone his retirement to take the ride. After the race Lewis said; "It was well worth it, it's wonderful to go out on a winner in a big race like this". Double Form's final race was the Prix de l'Abbaye on 7 October. Although the King's Stand Stakes and the Abbaye were the only two Group One races in Europe open to three-year-olds and older horses, no sprinter had previously completed the double. Double Form started 3.9/1 second favourite behind Thatching, with the other contenders including King of Macedon, Sigy, Ahonoora, Adraan (Prix d'Arenberg, Prix du Bois), Greenland Park and Kilijaro. Making the most of a favourable inside draw, Reid sent Double Form into an early lead and looked likely to win easily 400 metres from the finish. In the closing stage however, he began to tire but ran on "most bravely", and in a very close finish he prevailed by a head and a nose from Kilijaro and Greenland Park, with the Irish filly Baby Brew half a length away in fourth.

== Assessment ==
In 1977, the independent Timeform organisation awarded Double Form a rating of 110 p, the "p" indicating that he was expected to make significantly more than normal improvement: in their annual Racehorses of 1977, they described him as "a colt of tremendous potential". In the following year he was rated 123 by Timeform, seven pounds below their best sprinter Solinus. In the official International Classification, he was rated six pounds below Solinus and thirteen pounds behind the top-rated three-year-old Ile de Bourbon. In 1979 Timeform praised Double Form for his "grit and determination" and awarded him a rating of 130, making him their highest-rated British-trained sprinter, one pound behind the Irish-trained Thatching. The International Classification rated him five pounds inferior to Thatching and eight pounds behind Ile de Bourbon, making him the ninth-best older horse in Europe. In the Gilbey Champion Racehorses awards, based on points awarded for performances in major races, Double Form was named Champion Sprinter of 1979.

== Stud record ==
Double Form was retired from racing to become a breeding stallion at the Airlie Stud, near Dublin at a fee of £4,000 in 1980. He had little opportunity to establish, himself, dying on 22 April 1983 at the age of eight, after severing a main artery when covering a mare. He showed considerable promise in his brief stud career, siring Huntingdale, Timeform's top-rated two-year-old of 1985 and Double Schwartz a sprinter who emulated his sire by winning the Prix de l'Abbaye in 1986.

== Pedigree ==
Pedigree of Double Form, bay stallion, 1975
Sire Habitat (USA) 1966	Sir Gaylord (USA); 1959	Turn-To	Royal Charger
Sire Habitat (USA) 1966	Sir Gaylord (USA); 1959	Turn-To	Source Sucree
Sire Habitat (USA) 1966	Sir Gaylord (USA); 1959	Somethingroyal	Princequillo
Sire Habitat (USA) 1966	Sir Gaylord (USA); 1959	Somethingroyal	Imperatrice
Sire Habitat (USA) 1966	Little Hut (USA); 1952	Occupy	Bull Dog
Sire Habitat (USA) 1966	Little Hut (USA); 1952	Occupy	Miss Bunting
Sire Habitat (USA) 1966	Little Hut (USA); 1952	Savage Beauty	Challenger
Sire Habitat (USA) 1966	Little Hut (USA); 1952	Savage Beauty	Khara
Dam Fanghorn (GB) 1966	Crocket (GB); 1960	King of the Tudors	Tudor Minstrel
Dam Fanghorn (GB) 1966	Crocket (GB); 1960	King of the Tudors	Glen Line
Dam Fanghorn (GB) 1966	Crocket (GB); 1960	Chandelier	Goyama
Dam Fanghorn (GB) 1966	Crocket (GB); 1960	Chandelier	Queen of Light
Dam Fanghorn (GB) 1966	Honeymoon House (GB); 1955	Honeyway	Fairway
Dam Fanghorn (GB) 1966	Honeymoon House (GB); 1955	Honeyway	Honey Buzzard
Dam Fanghorn (GB) 1966	Honeymoon House (GB); 1955	Primavera	Chamossaire
Dam Fanghorn (GB) 1966	Honeymoon House (GB); 1955	Primavera	Gadabout (Family:14-c)
