= Precocious (horse) =

British-bred Thoroughbred racehorse

- Sire: Mummy's Pet
- Grandsire: Sing Sing
- Dam: Mrs Moss
- Damsire: Reform
- Sex: Stallion
- Foaled: 4 April 1981
- Country: United Kingdom
- Colour: Bay
- Breeder: Marquess of Tavistock
- Owner: Marquess of Tavistock
- Trainer: Henry Cecil
- Record: 5: 5-0-0

Major wins
- National Stakes (1983); Norfolk Stakes (1983); Molecomb Stakes (1983); Gimcrack Stakes (1983)

Awards
- Timeform rating 126 (1983)

Precocious (4 April 1981 – 25 August 2006) was an undefeated British Thoroughbred racehorse and sire. He raced only as a two-year-old, with his career being restricted to a period of less than four months between April and August 1983. After winning a highly competitive maiden race on his racecourse debut he went on to win the National Stakes, Norfolk Stakes, Molecomb Stakes and Gimcrack Stakes. In all, he was unbeaten in five races and was never seriously challenged. Shortly after his win in the Gimcrack he sustained an injury which ended his racing career. He stood as a breeding stallion in England and Sweden with moderate results and died in 2006.

== Background ==
Precocious was a dark-coated bay horse with a broad white blaze and a white sock on his left hind foot bred by his owner, the Marquess of Tavistock at his Bloomsbury Stud at Woburn Abbey in Bedfordshire. He was the eighth of fifteen foals produced by Tavistock's broodmare Mrs Moss: most of her other winners were fast-maturing sprinters including Krayyan (National Stakes) and Pushy (Queen Mary Stakes), but the best of her offspring was probably Jupiter Island who won the Japan Cup as a seven-year-old in 1986. Precocious's sire Mummy's Pet, was a pure sprinter whose biggest wins came in the Flying Childers Stakes and Temple Stakes. Most of his best offspring were also sprinters, including Runnett (Haydock Sprint Cup), Mummy's Game (Temple Stakes), Tina's Pet (King George Stakes), Petorius (Temple Stakes), Colmore Row (Norfolk Stakes) and Chummy's Special (Norfolk Stakes).

The colt was trained by Henry Cecil at his Warren Place stable in Newmarket and was ridden in his races by the veteran English jockey Lester Piggott.

== Racing career ==
=== 1983: two-year-old season ===
Precocious's early training was disrupted by problems with his knees, and he was given a six-week break in early spring. The colt began his racing career in the Philip Cornes Nickel Alloys qualifier, a maiden race over five furlongs at Newmarket Racecourse on 30 April. He started favourite and won impressively by three lengths from King of Clubs, with Maajid in third place. King of Clubs later emerged as a top-class racehorse, winning several major races including the Premio Emilio Turati and the Premio Vittorio di Capua. Precocious's next race was the Listed National Stakes at Sandown Park Racecourse. He produced what Timeform described as a "tremendously smooth display" to win easily from four opponents.

On 16 June, Precocious was moved up in class for the Group Three Norfolk Stakes at Royal Ascot for which he started at odds of 4/11 in a field which included several other winners. He took the lead approaching the final furlong and drew clear of his rivals to win by three lengths without Piggott having to exert any more than the bare minimum of pressure. At Goodwood Racecourse in July, Precocious started at odds of 30/100 despite being required to concede seven pounds to the rest of the runners in the Group Three Molecomb Stakes. He took the lead a furlong from the finish and won by two and a half lengths from the filly Sajeda. In August Precocious was moved up in distance to contest the Group Two Gimcrack Stakes at York Racecourse. He started the 8/11 favourite, with the previously undefeated Al Mamoon being the only horse seriously backed against him. Precocious looked extremely impressive before the race in contrast to Al Mamoon, who sweated heavily and appeared nervous and agitated. The race was no contest, as Precocious took the lead approaching the final quarter mile and drew away from his rivals to win very impressively by six lengths from Adams Peak. In the final yards his stride became somewhat "scratchy" leading to some speculation that he was reaching the end of his stamina. Two weeks after his win at York, Precocious sustained an injury in his stable and missed intended runs in the Flying Childers Stakes and Middle Park Stakes.

== Assessment ==
In 1981, the independent Timeform organisation gave Precocious a rating of 126, five pounds below the top-rated two-year-old El Gran Senor. In the official International Classification, he was less highly regarded, being rated thirteen pounds inferior to El Gran Senor.

== Stud record ==
Precocious never fully recovered from his injuries and was retired to stud for the 1985 season. He was based at the New England Stud in Newmarket and also stood for a time in Sweden. By far the best of his offspring was the sprinter Elbio, which won the King's Stand Stakes at Royal Ascot in 1991 and 1993. Precocious was euthanised at the Bloomsbury stud on 25 August 2006 at the age of twenty-five.

== Pedigree ==
Pedigree of Precocious, bay stallion, 1981
| Sire Mummy's Pet (GB) 1968 | Sing Sing (GB); 1957 | Tudor Minstrel | Owen Tudor |
| Sire Mummy's Pet (GB) 1968 | Sing Sing (GB); 1957 | Tudor Minstrel | Sansonnet |
| Sire Mummy's Pet (GB) 1968 | Sing Sing (GB); 1957 | Agin the Law | Portlaw* |
| Sire Mummy's Pet (GB) 1968 | Sing Sing (GB); 1957 | Agin the Law | Revolte |
| Sire Mummy's Pet (GB) 1968 | Money for Nothing (GB); 1962 | Grey Sovereign | Nasrullah |
| Sire Mummy's Pet (GB) 1968 | Money for Nothing (GB); 1962 | Grey Sovereign | Kong* |
| Sire Mummy's Pet (GB) 1968 | Money for Nothing (GB); 1962 | Sweet Nothing | Honeyway |
| Sire Mummy's Pet (GB) 1968 | Money for Nothing (GB); 1962 | Sweet Nothing | Farthing Damages* |
| Dam Mrs Moss (GB) 1969 | Reform (GB); 1964 | Pall Mall | Palestine |
| Dam Mrs Moss (GB) 1969 | Reform (GB); 1964 | Pall Mall | Malapert* |
| Dam Mrs Moss (GB) 1969 | Reform (GB); 1964 | Country House | Vieux Manoir |
| Dam Mrs Moss (GB) 1969 | Reform (GB); 1964 | Country House | Miss Coventry |
| Dam Mrs Moss (GB) 1969 | Golden Plate (GB); 1964 | Whistler | Panorama |
| Dam Mrs Moss (GB) 1969 | Golden Plate (GB); 1964 | Whistler | Farthing Damages* |
| Dam Mrs Moss (GB) 1969 | Golden Plate (GB); 1964 | Good as Gold | Nimbus* |
| Dam Mrs Moss (GB) 1969 | Golden Plate (GB); 1964 | Good as Gold | Gamble in Gold (Family:14-b) |

* Precocious is inbred 4S x 4D to the mare Farthing Damages, meaning that she appears fourth generation on the sire side of his pedigree, and fourth generation on the dam side of his pedigree.

* Precocious is inbred 4S x 5D to the stallion Portlaw, meaning that he appears fourth generation on the sire side of his pedigree, and fifth generation (via Malapert) on the dam side of his pedigree.

* Precocious is inbred 4S x 5D to the mare Kong, meaning that she appears fourth generation on the sire side of his pedigree, and fifth generation (via Nimbus) on the dam side of his pedigree.

== See also ==
- List of leading Thoroughbred racehorses
