= Scintillate (horse) =

British-bred Thoroughbred racehorse

- Racing silks of James Morrison
- Sire: Sparkler
- Grandsire: Hard Tack
- Dam: Set Free
- Damsire: Worden
- Sex: Mare
- Foaled: 24 January 1976
- Country: United Kingdom
- Colour: Bay
- Breeder: Fonthill Stud
- Owner: James Ian Morrison
- Trainer: Jeremy Tree
- Record: 7: 2-1-1

Major wins
- Oaks Stakes (1979)

Awards
- Timeform rating: 102 (1978), 119 (1979)

Scintillate (foaled 24 January 1976) was a British Thoroughbred racehorse and broodmare best known for winning the classic Oaks Stakes in 1979. She showed promising form as a two-year-old although she failed to win in three races. After recording her first win in the Sandleford Priory Stakes in the following spring she won the Oaks as a 20/1 outsider. She ran poorly in two subsequent races and was retired to brood where she had limited success as a broodmare.

== Background ==
Scintillate was a dark-coated bay mare with a white star bred by the Fonthill Stud in Wiltshire which was managed by James Ian Morrison, the filly's owner throughout her racing career. She was from the second crop of foals sired by Sparkler who won the Queen Anne Stakes in 1972 and the Prix du Moulin in 1973, but produced arguably his best performance in defeat, when beaten a head by Brigadier Gerard in the St James's Palace Stakes. In his first season at stud, Sparkler had sired the 1000 Guineas winner Enstone Spark. Scintillate was the fifth foal of the outstanding broodmare Set Free who had previously produced the classic winners Juliette Marny (Oaks) and Julio Mariner (St Leger Stakes). The filly was sent into training with Jeremy Tree at Beckhampton in Wiltshire.

== Racing career ==
=== 1978: two-year-old season ===
After finishing third in a five furlong race on her racecourse debut, Scintillate ran in a seven furlong maiden race at Newbury Racecourse in early September. She appeared to be an unlucky loser, finishing second to Head Huntress after struggling to obtain a clear run in the straight. Later in the month the filly was moved up in class for the Hoover Fillies' Mile (then a Group Three race) at Ascot Racecourse. She looked very impressive in the paddock and stayed on strongly in the straight to finish fourth behind Formulate, Odeon and Rimosa's Pet. In their annual Racehorses of 1978 Timeform described her as a filly who would be sure to win races when tried over longer distances.

=== 1979: three-year-old season ===
Scintillate began her three-year-old season in the Sandleford Priory Stakes over ten furlongs at Newbury Racecourse in May. In a slowly run race, she took the lead a furlong from the finish and won by half a length and a neck from Crystal Queen and Untitled. On 9 June Scintillate started a 20/1 outsider for the 201st running of the Oak Stakes over one and a half miles at Epsom Downs Racecourse. The leading contenders included L'Ile du Reve who had won the Cheshire Oaks by seven lengths, Godetia (Irish 1,000 Guineas), Just A Game and Rimosa's Pet (Musidora Stakes). The ground, which had been good when Troy had won the Derby earlier in the week had become very soft after three days of heavy rain. Ridden by Pat Eddery, Scintillate was towards the back of the field in the early stages but was always going well, in contrast to several of the fancied horses, who were clearly struggling to cope with the conditions. She moved alongside the leaders in the final quarter mile and took a clear advantage inside the final furlong. She was never in danger of defeat and won very easily by three lengths from Bonnie Isle with Britannia's Rule a length away in third.

After a break of more than two months, Scintillate reappeared in the Virginia Stakes over ten furlongs at Newcastle Racecourse in August and ran very disappointingly, finishing last of the five runners behind Abbeydale. When the filly contested the Prix Vermeille at Longchamp Racecourse on 16 September she was equipped with blinkers for the first time. Starting at odds of 12/1 she never looked likely to win and finished ninth of the thirteen runners behind Three Troikas, beaten eight lengths.

== Assessment ==
In 1978, the independent Timeform organisation gave Scintillate a rating of 102, thirty pounds below their top-rated two-year-old filly Sigy. In the Free Handicap, a rating of the best two-year-olds to race in Britain, she was rated eighteen pounds below the top-rated fillies Devon Ditty and Formulate. In the following year she was rated 119 by Timeform, while the International Classification rated her seventeen pounds inferior to the leading three-year-old filly Three Troikas.

In their book, A Century of Champions, based on the Timeform rating system, John Randall and Tony Morris rated Scintillate an "inferior" winner of the Oaks.

== Brood record ==
Scintillate was retired form racing to become a broodmare. She produced twelve foals between 1981 and 1995. She was exported to Japan in 1990.

- Sequin Lady (bay filly, foaled in 1981, sired by Star Appeal), unraced
- Alshinfarah (bay colt, foaled 1983, by Great Nephew), won Zukunfts-Rennen
- Salib
- Alghalih (chestnut filly, foaled 1985, by Blushing Groom), failed to win in ten races
- Sabiq (bay colt, foaled 1986, by Seattle Slew), unraced
- Nawassi (brown filly, foaled 1987, by Shadeed), failed to win in thirteen races
- Beshaarh
- Fauri (bay colt, foaled 1989, by Danzig), unraced
- Miss Raffinee (bay filly, foaled 1991, by Manila)
- Biwa Apple (bay filly, foaled 1992, by Adjudicating)
- Hawaiian City (bay filly, foaled 1994, by Stately Don)
- Brave City (bay colt, foaled 1995, by Dancing Brave)

== Pedigree ==
Pedigree of Scintillate (GB), bay mare, 1976
Sire Sparkler (GB) 1968	Hard Tack (GB); 1955	Hard Sauce	Ardan
Sire Sparkler (GB) 1968	Hard Tack (GB); 1955	Hard Sauce	Saucy Bella
Sire Sparkler (GB) 1968	Hard Tack (GB); 1955	Cowes	Blue Peter
Sire Sparkler (GB) 1968	Hard Tack (GB); 1955	Cowes	Lighthearted
Sire Sparkler (GB) 1968	Diamond Spur (IRE); 1961	Preciptic	Precipitation
Sire Sparkler (GB) 1968	Diamond Spur (IRE); 1961	Preciptic	Artistic
Sire Sparkler (GB) 1968	Diamond Spur (IRE); 1961	Diamond Princess	His Highness
Sire Sparkler (GB) 1968	Diamond Spur (IRE); 1961	Diamond Princess	Hatton
Dam Set Free (GB) 1964	Worden (FR); 1966	Wild Risk	Rialto
Dam Set Free (GB) 1964	Worden (FR); 1966	Wild Risk	Wild Violet
Dam Set Free (GB) 1964	Worden (FR); 1966	Sans Tares	Sind
Dam Set Free (GB) 1964	Worden (FR); 1966	Sans Tares	Tara
Dam Set Free (GB) 1964	Emancipation (GB); 1954	Le Sage	Chamossaire
Dam Set Free (GB) 1964	Emancipation (GB); 1954	Le Sage	Miss Know All
Dam Set Free (GB) 1964	Emancipation (GB); 1954	Fair Freedom	Fair Trial
Dam Set Free (GB) 1964	Emancipation (GB); 1954	Fair Freedom	Democratie (Family: 6-b)
