= Lockton (horse) =

British-bred Thoroughbred racehorse

- Sire: Moorestyle
- Grandsire: Manacle
- Dam: Bridestones
- Damsire: Jan Ekels
- Sex: Stallion
- Foaled: 14 May 1984
- Country: United Kingdom
- Colour: Chestnut
- Breeder: Alan Gibson
- Owner: Alan Gibson; Blue Goose Stable
- Trainer: Jeremy Hindley; Angel Penna Jr.
- Record: 25: 6-4-1

Major wins
- National Stakes (1986); Strensall Stakes (1987); Joel Stakes (1987)

Awards
- Timeform rating 120 (1986), 115 (1987)

Lockton (14 May 1984 – 2009) was a British-bred Thoroughbred racehorse and sire. As a two-year-old in 1986 he won three of his five races including the National Stakes and finished second in the Grand Critérium. In the following year he added three more victories including the Strensall Stakes and the Joel Stakes as well as running second in the Hollywood Derby. He failed to reproduce his form when moved to the United States and failed to win a race in his last two seasons on the track. After retiring with a record of six wins from twenty-five starts he had some success as a breeding stallion in Turkey.

== Background ==
Lockton was a "rangy, attractive" chestnut horse with a narrow white blaze and a short white sock on his left hind leg bred in England by his owner Alan Gibson. He sent into training with Jeremy Hindley at his Clarehaven Stables in Newmarket.

His sire Moorestyle was an outstanding sprinter who was rated the best horse in Europe in 1980. He sired only three crops of foals before dying of a ruptured intestine caused by grass sickness in 1984. Lockton's dam Bridestones, a half-sister to the Doncaster Cup winner Crash Course, was a useful racemare who won three times over middle distances in 1978 and added a fourth success in 1979. As a descendant of the French broodmare Phebe (foaled 1930) she was distantly related to Ibn Bey, Ouija Board and Kingston Town.

== Racing career ==
=== 1986: two-year-old season ===
After finishing second in a maiden race over six furlongs on his racecourse debut, Lockton ran unplaced on his next start before recording his first victory in a maiden over seven furlongs at York Racecourse in July. Less than a week after his win at York, the colt followed up in a minor event over the same distance at Newmarket. He was then stepped up in class to contest the Group 3 Solario Stakes at Sandown Park in August and finished third behind Shining Water (a filly) and Sanam, beaten three lengths by the winner. He looked to be a somewhat unlucky loser, having been boxed in on the inside rail and then hampered when attempting to switch to the outside.

On 14 September, Lockton was sent to the Curragh in Ireland to contest the National Stakes, a race which had been Group 1 status in 1985. With no previous Group race winners among the nine runners the field appeared to be a substandard one and Lockton was made the 7/2 third choice in the betting behind the Irish filly Flawless Image (sixth in the Phoenix Stakes) and the Ian Balding-trained Morewoods (fourth in the Gimcrack Stakes). Ridden by Michael Hills, Lockton tracked the leaders before moving into second place behind Baba Karam approaching the last quarter mile. The colt produced a sustained run in the closing stages and caught Baba Karam on the line to win by a head with Rock Chanteur three quarters of a length away in third place.

Lockton ended his season with a trip to France for the Group 1 Grand Critérium over 1600 metres at Longchamp Racecourse in October and produced one of his best performances, staying on strongly in the straight to finish second of the nine runners behind the Aga Khan's filly Danishkada.

At the end of the season Lockton was given a rating of 120 by the independent Timeform organization, making him twelve poinds inferior to Reference Point who was their best two-year-old. He was rated eleven pounds behind the top-rated Reference Point in the official International Classification for 1986.

=== 1987: three-year-old season ===
Lockton began his second season at Thirsk Racecourse in April and won the one mile Classic Trial by a neck from the Barry Hills-trained Julliard. In the 2000 Guineas on 2 May he started a 22/1 outsider and came home twelfth of the fourteen runners behind Mystiko. In June he was sent to France and finished sixth to Risk Me in the Grand Prix de Paris over 2000 metres at Longchamp. After a second-place finish to Ascot Knight in the Scottish Derby he recorded his second win of the season in the Listed Strensall Stakes over nine furlongs at York Racecourse in September, beating Shady Heights by one and a half lengths. Later that month he ran second to Most Welcome in the Select Stakes at Goodwood before returning to winning form when beating Free Fact in the Joel Stakes over ten furlongs at Newmarket in October.

For his last two races of the season, Lockton was sent to compete in the United States. He finished fifth behind the five-year-old I'm A Banker in the Kelso Handicap at Belmont Park and then ran second to Stately Don in a division of the Hollywood Derby on 22 November.

Timeform awarded him a rating of 115 in 1987 and described him as "tough, genuine and consistent".

=== 1988 & 1989: four and five-year-old seasons ===
For the 1988 season, Lockton was transferred permanently to the United States where he was trained by Angel Penna, Jr and raced in the colours of Blue Goose Stable. He finished third in the Fort Lauderdale Handicap at Gulfstream Park but finished no better than fifth in five subsequent starts that year. In 1989 the five-year-old failed to win or place in three starts, ending his track career by coming home fifth in the Coors Light Silver Bullet Stakes at Gulfstream on 4 March.

== Stud record ==
Lockton was retired from racing to become a breeding stallion in Turkey. He died in Turkey in 2009.

== Pedigree ==
Pedigree of Lockton (GB), chestnut stallion, 1984
Sire Moorestyle (GB) 1977	Manacle (GB); 1964	Sing Sing	Tudor Minstrel
Sire Moorestyle (GB) 1977	Manacle (GB); 1964	Sing Sing	Agin the Law
Sire Moorestyle (GB) 1977	Manacle (GB); 1964	Hard and Fast	Hard Sauce
Sire Moorestyle (GB) 1977	Manacle (GB); 1964	Hard and Fast	Boodly
Sire Moorestyle (GB) 1977	Guiding Star (SWE); 1969	Reliance	Tantieme
Sire Moorestyle (GB) 1977	Guiding Star (SWE); 1969	Reliance	Relance
Sire Moorestyle (GB) 1977	Guiding Star (SWE); 1969	Star of Bethlehem	Arctic Star
Sire Moorestyle (GB) 1977	Guiding Star (SWE); 1969	Star of Bethlehem	Merry Xmas
Dam Bridestones (GB) 1975	Jan Ekels (GB); 1969	Derring-Do	Darius
Dam Bridestones (GB) 1975	Jan Ekels (GB); 1969	Derring-Do	Sipsey Bridge
Dam Bridestones (GB) 1975	Jan Ekels (GB); 1969	Foolhardy	Sicambre
Dam Bridestones (GB) 1975	Jan Ekels (GB); 1969	Foolhardy	Dasher
Dam Bridestones (GB) 1975	Lucky Stream (GB); 1956	Persian Gulf	Bahram
Dam Bridestones (GB) 1975	Lucky Stream (GB); 1956	Persian Gulf	Double Life
Dam Bridestones (GB) 1975	Lucky Stream (GB); 1956	Kypris	Victrix
Dam Bridestones (GB) 1975	Lucky Stream (GB); 1956	Kypris	Phinoola (Family 12-b)
