= Precocious =

Precocious, precocity, or precociousness may refer to:

- Precocious (horse) (1981–2006), a British Thoroughbred racehorse
- Precocious puberty, a developmental disorder
- Precocious toddler, a legal fiction which assumes that a living person is fertile at birth
- Intellectual giftedness, especially when in children

== See also ==
- Precociality, a developmental strategy in some animals
