= Huntingdale (horse) =

Irish-bred Thoroughbred racehorse

- Sire: Double Form
- Grandsire: Habitat
- Dam: Abbeydale
- Damsire: Huntercombe
- Sex: Stallion
- Foaled: 26 February 1983
- Country: Ireland
- Colour: Chestnut
- Breeder: Airlie Stud and Mrs. A. Sutton
- Owner: Mrs P. J. Threlfall
- Trainer: Jeremy Hindley
- Record: 7: 1-2-1

Major wins
- Dewhurst Stakes (1985)

Awards
- Timeform top-rated two-year-old (1985); Timeform rating 132 (1985), 124 (1986)

Huntingdale (foaled 26 February 1983) was an Irish-bred British-trained Thoroughbred racehorse and sire. He was rated the best two-year-old of 1985 by Timeform after finishing second in his first two races and then recording an upset victory in the Dewhurst Stakes. In the following year he finished third to Dancing Brave in the 2000 Guineas but his subsequent performances were disappointing. The Dewhurst was his only success in a career of seven races which lasted from August 1985 until April 1987. After his retirement from racing he was retired to stud but had very little success as a sire of winners.

== Background ==
Huntingale was a "big, rangy" chestnut horse with a small white star and a white coronet on his right forefoot bred in Ireland by the Airlie Stud. His sire Double Form was the leading British sprinter of 1979 when his wins included the King's Stand Stakes, Haydock Sprint Cup and Prix de l'Abbaye. In a brief stud career (he died in 1983) he sired several other good winners including Double Schwartz, who emulated his sire by winning the Prix de l'Abbaye in 1986. Huntingdale was the second foal of Abbeydale, a high-class racemare who finished second in the 1000 Guineas and, as a descendant of mare Red Winter was related to Master Willie.

As a yearling, Huntingdale was sent to the Highflyer Sale at Newmarket, where he was bought for 70,000 guineas by the trainer Jeremy Hindley. The sale was cancelled when a veterinary examination revealed problems with the colt's breathing, but Hindley re-purchased him in a private deal with the breeder. The horse was owned by Mrs P. J. Threlfall and trained by Hindley at his Clarehaven Stables in Newmarket.

== Racing career ==
=== 1985: two-year-old season ===
Huntingdale never contested a maiden race beginning his racing career in the Listed Acomb Stakes over seven furlongs at York Racecourse in August. He finished second, half a length behind Native Wizard, having hung badly to the left in the closing stages. In early October, Huntingdale contested the Listed Somerville Tattersall Stakes at Newmarket Racecourse. He showed his inexperience (ran "green") before finishing second by a length to the odds-on favourite Truly Nureyev.

Two weeks after his defeat in the Somerville Tattersall Stakes, Huntingdale was moved up in class for Britain's most prestigious for two-year-olds, the Group One Dewhurst Stakes over the same course and distance. Ridden by Michael Hills, he started at odds of 12/1 in a field which included Sure Blade (winner of the Coventry Stakes and Champagne Stakes), Bakharoff (Chesham Stakes), Woodman (Anglesey Stakes) and Nomination (Richmond Stakes). Hills settled the colt towards the rear of the field before switching to the outside and accelerating two furlongs from the finish. Huntingdale made "relentless headway" to overtake Sure Blade and Nomination inside the final furlong and hold the late challenge of Bakharoff to win by three-quarters of a length. The form of the race was subsequently boosted when Bakharoff won the William Hill Futurity eight days later.

=== 1986: three-year-old season ===
Throughout the winter of 1985/1986 Huntingdale was regarded as a leading contender for the 2000 Guineas. He did not have a trial race, making his seasonal debut in the Guineas on 3 May 1986 over Newmarket's Rowley Mile course and starting second favourite at odds of 6/1. He stayed on well in the closing stages, but never looked likely to win, finishing third of the fifteen runners behind Dancing Brave and Green Desert. Two weeks later, Huntingdale started the 7/2 favourite for the Irish 2,000 Guineas on heavy ground at the Curragh but faded in the closing stages and finished fourth of the six runners behind Flash of Steel. Prior to the race, Huntingdale had been supported in the betting for the Derby, but following his defeat he was no longer considered as a serious contender for the Epsom classic. The ground was firm at Royal Ascot on 17 June when Huntingdale reappeared in the St James's Palace Stakes. He performed very poorly and finished last of the seven runners behind Sure Blade. He returned from the race a "sick horse", and did not run again in 1986.

=== 1987: four-year-old season ===
Huntingdale remained in training as a four-year-old and reappeared in a seven furlong race at Leicester Racecourse in April. He finished eighth of the twelve runners and did not race again.

== Assessment ==
In the official International Classification for 1985, Huntingdale was the second highest-rated two-year-old in Europe, one pound behind Bakharoff, and two pounds ahead of Bold Arrangement, Nomrood, Sure Blade and the leading filly Baiser Vole. The independent Timeform organisation, however, named Huntingdale as the best two-year-old with a rating of 132 two pounds ahead of Bakharoff. In the following year he was given a rating of 124 by Timeform, sixteen pounds behind the top-rated Dancing Brave. In the International Classification, he was ranked the tenth-best three-year-old colt in Europe over one mile.

== Stud record ==
Huntingdale retired from racing to become a breeding stallion at the Loughtown Stud in County Kildare at an initial fee of 3,000 Irish guineas. He was later based in Australia, South Africa and Zimbabwe.

He was not a great success as a sire. The best of his progeny was probably Gold Brose, who won the Silver Slipper Stakes in 1992. He was the damsire of the leading Malaysian racehorse Triple Luck whose wins included the Perak Coronation Cup.

== Pedigree ==
Pedigree of Huntingdale (IRE), chestnut stallion, 1983
Sire Double Form (IRE) 1975	Habitat (USA); 1966	Sir Gaylord	Turn-To
Sire Double Form (IRE) 1975	Habitat (USA); 1966	Sir Gaylord	Somethingroyal
Sire Double Form (IRE) 1975	Habitat (USA); 1966	Little Hut	Occupy
Sire Double Form (IRE) 1975	Habitat (USA); 1966	Little Hut	Savage Beauty
Sire Double Form (IRE) 1975	Fanghorn (GB); 1966	Crocket	King of the Tudors
Sire Double Form (IRE) 1975	Fanghorn (GB); 1966	Crocket	Chandelier
Sire Double Form (IRE) 1975	Fanghorn (GB); 1966	Honeymoon House	Honeyway
Sire Double Form (IRE) 1975	Fanghorn (GB); 1966	Honeymoon House	Primavera
Dam Abbeydale (GB) 1976	Huntercombe (GB); 1967	Derring-Do	Darius
Dam Abbeydale (GB) 1976	Huntercombe (GB); 1967	Derring-Do	Sipsey Bridge
Dam Abbeydale (GB) 1976	Huntercombe (GB); 1967	Ergina	Fair Trial
Dam Abbeydale (GB) 1976	Huntercombe (GB); 1967	Ergina	Ballechin
Dam Abbeydale (GB) 1976	Lucky Maid (GB); 1963	Acropolis	Donatello
Dam Abbeydale (GB) 1976	Lucky Maid (GB); 1963	Acropolis	Aurora
Dam Abbeydale (GB) 1976	Lucky Maid (GB); 1963	Mora Bai	Sayajirao
Dam Abbeydale (GB) 1976	Lucky Maid (GB); 1963	Mora Bai	Red Winter (Family:4-j)
