= Mister Baileys =

British Thoroughbred racehorse

- Sire: Robellino
- Grandsire: Roberto
- Dam: Thimblerigger
- Damsire: Sharpen Up
- Sex: Stallion
- Foaled: 14 February 1991
- Country: United Kingdom
- Colour: Brown
- Breeder: Ranston Ltd
- Owner: G. E. Bailey Ltd (Baileys Horse Feeds)
- Trainer: Mark Johnston
- Record: 9:4-0-2
- Earnings: £327,632

Major wins
- Vintage Stakes (1993); Royal Lodge Stakes (1993); 2000 Guineas (1994); Timeform rating: 123
- Last updated on 27 July 2022

Mister Baileys (1991–2009) was a British Thoroughbred racehorse and sire. In a career that lasted from June 1993 to July 1994 he ran nine times and won four races. After winning the Vintage Stakes and the Royal Lodge Stakes as a two-year-old, he became the first Northern-trained Classic winner for seventeen years when he won the 2000 Guineas in record time on his three-year-old debut. After three further races he was retired to stud, but failed to make an impression as a sire of winners after his health was badly affected by an attack of grass sickness. He was eventually gelded in 2003 and died in 2009.

== Background ==
Mister Baileys was a bay horse with a prominent white blaze and three white feet, bred by Ranston Ltd. He was sired by Robellino, a son of Roberto who won the Royal Lodge Stakes and sired several good winners including Royal Rebel (Ascot Gold Cup) and Rebelline (Tattersalls Gold Cup). Mister Baileys was sent from Paradise Farm Stud in Dorset to the Tattersalls sales as a weanling in November 1992, where he was bought for 10,000 guineas by Paul Venner of G. R. Bailey Ltd, a company better known as "Baileys Horse Feeds". The horse was named to promote his owners' products. A year later Mister Baileys was sent to the sales again and bought for 10,500 guineas by the trainer Mark Johnston. It would appear that Johnston was paying for a share in the colt as he raced in the name of G. R. Bailey Ltd, while being trained by Johnston at Middleham, Yorkshire.

== Racing career ==
=== 1993: two-year-old season ===
Mister Baileys made his first racecourse appearance in a maiden race at Newcastle in June. Ridden by Dean McKeown, Mister Baileys started slowly but moved into the lead a furlong from the finish and pulled away from his twelve opponents to record an impressive seven-length win. In July, he started 11/10 favourite for a minor stakes race at Newbury. McKeown was unable to find a clear run at a crucial stage and although Mister Baileys finished strongly after being switched to the outside, he finished third to Classic Sky, beaten half a length and a short head. Twelve days after his defeat at Newbury, Mister Baileys was moved up in class for the Group Three Vintage Stakes at Goodwood Racecourse. He was able to reverse the Newbury form, taking the lead two furlongs out and winning by two and half lengths from Prince Babar, with Classic Sky fourth. In August, Mister Baileys was a disappointing favourite when finishing sixth behind Turtle Island in the Gimcrack Stakes. McKeown dropped his whip in the closing stages, but Mister Baileys appeared to be well beaten at the time. On his final start of the season, Mister Baileys was ridden by Frankie Dettori in the Group Two Royal Lodge Stakes at Ascot Racecourse. He turned into the straight in fifth place before moving forward to take the lead a furlong out and being driven out by Dettori to win by half a length from Concordial.

=== 1994: three-year-old season ===
Mister Baileys began his three-year-old season by becoming Johnston's first Classic runner when he ran in the 2000 Guineas at Newmarket on 30 April. He was ridden by Jason Weaver, who was also participating in his first Classic, and started at odds of 16/1 in a field of twenty-three runners. On the wide Rowley Mile course, the large field split into two groups, with Mister Baileys among the leaders of the group furthest away from the stands. Three furlongs from the finish he moved into the overall lead and held of the persistent challenge of Frankie Dettori on Grand Lodge to win in a photo-finish by a short-head. He was the first Classic winner trained in the North of England since 1977 and the winning time of 1:35.08 was a record for the race. Two weeks after his Classic victory, Mister Baileys was moved up in distance for the Dante Stakes over 10 1/2 furlongs at York. Starting the 7/4 favourite he appeared to have every chance in the straight but finished third, beaten 4 1/2 lengths by Erhaab.

In the Derby at Epsom, Mister Baileys started at odds of 14/1 in a field of twenty-five, with Erhaab being made the 7/2 favourite. Weaver sent the colt into the lead from the start and he went several lengths clear of the field at the turn into the straight. A furlong from the finish he was headed by King's Theatre and he weakened in the closing stages to finish fourth behind Erhaab, beaten just under eight lengths. His performance was praised, with many feeling that his effort over a distance which was clearly beyond his natural range was more creditable than his win at Newmarket. In July Mister Baileys returned to one mile for the Group One Sussex Stakes at Goodwood and started 7/4 favourite. He made most of the running, but faded in the final furlong to finish fifth of the nine runners behind Distant View. Before this race a half-share in Mister Baileys had been sold to the National Stud, and he was retired there following his defeat.

== Stud career ==
Shortly after his retirement to the National Stud, Mister Baileys suffered a near-fatal attack of grass sickness, which left him with fertility problems and other health issues. He stood at the Vinery Stud in Kentucky for three years before returning to the Whitsbury Manor stud in Hampshire, England. By 2003 he had become completely infertile and was gelded and pensioned to Venner's Petches Stud. He died in September 2009. He sired the winners of over one hundred races, but none at the highest class. His most successful offspring was the filly Bahia Breeze, who won a Listed race and was placed at Group level.

== Pedigree ==
Pedigree of Mister Baileys (GB), bay stallion, 1991
Sire Robellino (USA) 1978	Roberto; 1969	Hail to Reason	Turn-To
Sire Robellino (USA) 1978	Roberto; 1969	Hail to Reason	Nothirdchance
Sire Robellino (USA) 1978	Roberto; 1969	Bramalea	Nashua
Sire Robellino (USA) 1978	Roberto; 1969	Bramalea	Rarelea
Sire Robellino (USA) 1978	Isobelline; 1971	Pronto	Timor
Sire Robellino (USA) 1978	Isobelline; 1971	Pronto	Proserpina
Sire Robellino (USA) 1978	Isobelline; 1971	Isobella	Bold Ruler
Sire Robellino (USA) 1978	Isobelline; 1971	Isobella	Monarchy
Dam Thimblerigger (GB) 1976	Sharpen Up; 1969	Atan	Native Dancer
Dam Thimblerigger (GB) 1976	Sharpen Up; 1969	Atan	Mixed Marriage
Dam Thimblerigger (GB) 1976	Sharpen Up; 1969	Rocchetta	Rockefella
Dam Thimblerigger (GB) 1976	Sharpen Up; 1969	Rocchetta	Chambiges
Dam Thimblerigger (GB) 1976	Tender Annie; 1959	Tenerani	Bellini
Dam Thimblerigger (GB) 1976	Tender Annie; 1959	Tenerani	Tofanella
Dam Thimblerigger (GB) 1976	Tender Annie; 1959	Annie Oakley	Big Game
Dam Thimblerigger (GB) 1976	Tender Annie; 1959	Annie Oakley	Annetta (Family:1-k)
