= Prix de Seine-et-Oise =

Flat horse race in France

- Class: Group 3
- Location: Maisons-Laffitte; France
- Inaugurated: 1906
- Race type: Flat / Thoroughbred
- Website: france-galop.com

Race information
- Distance: 1,200 metres (6f)
- Surface: Turf
- Track: Straight
- Qualification: Three-years-old and up
- Weight: 59 kg Allowances; 1½ kg for fillies and mares 1 kg if no Group 1 win * 2 kg if no Group 2 win * 3 kg if no Group 3 win * * since January 1
- Purse: €80,000 (2019); 1st: €40,000

Prix de Seine-et-Oise
2024
| Oujda | Tazara | Quinault |

Previous years
2023
Exxtra | American Kestrel | Go Athletico
2022
Coeur De Pierre | Loubeisien | Vadream
2021
Egot | Brad The Brief | Mo Celita

2020-2011
2020
Brad The Brief | Coeur De Pierre | Air De Valse
2019
Trois Mille | Angel Alexander | Ilanga
2018
Snazzy Jazzy | The Right Man | Forza Capitano
2017
The Right Man | Gold Vibe | Son Cesio
2016
The Right Man | Porthilly | La Rioja
2015
Gammarth | Porthilly | Penmaen
2014
Gammarth | Caledonia Lady | Catcall
2013
Kolonel | Wedge Trust | Myasun
2012
Myasun | Maarek | Sabratah
2011
Iver Bridge Lad | Fred Lalloupet | Definightly

2010-2001
2010
Definightly | Alcohuaz | Dalghar
2009
Dunkerque | Salut L'Africain | Blue Cayenne
2008
Utmost Respect | Tiza | Dunkerque
2007
Tiza | Advanced | Mariol
2006
New Girlfriend | Advanced | Luisant
2005
Miss Emma | Welsh Emperor | Soave
2004
Miss Emma | Striking Ambition | Patavellian
2003
Soave | Welsh Emperor | Amazon Beauty
2002
Danehurst | Captain Rio | Binya
2001
Deep Sleep | Monnavanna | Imperial Beauty

2000-1991
2000
Danger Over | Khasayl | Jezebel
1999
Seltitude | Stella Berine | Terroir
1998
Keos | Bright Finish | Shmoose
1997
Dyhim Diamond | Linoise | Kistena
1996
Kistena | Don't Worry Me | Moon Is Up
1995
Hever Golf Rose | Tereshkova | Glenlivet
1994
Spain Lane | Wessam Prince | Way West
1993
Dolphin Street | Voleris | Midhish
1992
Central City | Monde Bleu | Silicon Bavaria
1991
Divine Danse | Danzante | Silicon Bavaria

The Prix de Seine-et-Oise is a Group 3 flat horse race in France open to thoroughbreds aged three years or older. It is run at Maisons-Laffitte over a distance of 1,200 metres (about 6 furlongs), and it is scheduled to take place each year in late October or early November.

== History ==
The event is named after Seine-et-Oise, a former department of France which encompassed parts of Paris. It was established in 1906, and was originally open to horses aged two or older. It was initially run at Maisons-Laffitte over 1,400 metres.

The Prix de Seine-et-Oise was abandoned throughout World War I, with no running from 1914 to 1918. It was staged at Saint-Cloud in 1920. It began a longer period at Saint-Cloud and was cut to 1,300 metres in 1929.

The race was cancelled twice during World War II, in 1939 and 1940. It was held at Maisons-Laffitte in 1941 and Le Tremblay in 1942. It took place at Maisons-Laffitte again from 1943 to 1945, and on the second occasion its distance was 1,400 metres.

In the post-war period, from 1946 to 1951, the Prix de Seine-et-Oise was usually held at Saint-Cloud. The one exception was in 1948, when it was switched to Longchamp. It returned to Maisons-Laffitte and was shortened to 1,200 metres in 1952.

The present system of race grading was introduced in 1971, and the Prix de Seine-et-Oise was classed at Group 3 level. It was closed to two-year-olds in 1981. For a period it took place in mid-September.

The race was run at Chantilly in 1995, and again from 1997 to 2000. It was moved to late October or early November in 2002.

== Records ==
Most successful horse (3 wins):

- Fine Art – 1942, 1944, 1945

Leading jockey (5 wins):

- Maurice Philipperon – Vertueuse (1963), King of Macedon (1978, 1979), Parioli (1985, 1986)

Leading trainer (10 wins):

- François Mathet – Menetrier (1948), Bel Amour (1951), Virgule (1954), Reinata (1955), Mystic (1957), Edellic (1959), Texanita (1964), Ancyre (1967), Zeddaan (1968), Bayraan (1974)

Leading owner (7 wins):

- François Dupré – La Melodie (1941), Menetrier (1948), Bel Amour (1951), Virgule (1954), Reinata (1955), Mystic (1957), Texanita (1964)

== Winners since 1980 ==
| Year | Winner | Age | Jockey | Trainer | Owner | Time |
|---|---|---|---|---|---|---|
| 1980 | Kilijaro | 4 | Alain Lequeux | Olivier Douieb | Serge Fradkoff |
| 1981 | Rabdan | 4 | Lester Piggott | Robert Armstrong | Robert Sangster | 1:11.60 |
| 1982 | Sayyaf | 5 | Tony Ives | Bill O'Gorman | Moufid Dabaghi | 1:10.20 |
| 1983 | Maximova | 3 | Freddy Head | Criquette Head | Haras d'Etreham |
| 1984 | Proskona | 3 | Cash Asmussen | François Boutin | Stavros Niarchos |
| 1985 | Parioli | 4 | Maurice Philipperon | John Cunnington, Jr. | Danny Arnold |
| 1986 | Parioli | 5 | Maurice Philipperon | John Cunnington, Jr. | Danny Arnold |
| 1987 | Glifahda | 4 | Alain Lequeux | David Smaga | Thierry van Zuylen |
| 1988 | Bluebook | 3 | Alain Badel | Alain Falourd | Marquess of Tavistock | 1:09.90 |
| 1989 | Aliocha | 3 | Tony Cruz | François Boutin | Ecurie Fustok | 1:12.70 |
| 1990 | Silicon Bavaria | 3 | William Mongil | Robert Collet | Sieglinde Wolf |
| 1991 | Divine Danse | 3 | Freddy Head | Criquette Head | Ecurie Aland | 1:11.20 |
| 1992 | Central City | 3 | Corey Black | Richard Hannon Sr. | George Strawbridge | 1:11.10 |
| 1993 | Dolphin Street | 3 | Cash Asmussen | John Hammond | Stavros Niarchos | 1:13.10 |
| 1994 | Spain Lane | 3 | Thierry Jarnet | André Fabre | Maktoum Al Maktoum | 1:12.40 |
| 1995 | Hever Golf Rose | 4 | Jason Weaver | Joe Naughton | Michael Hanson | 1:12.40 |
| 1996 | Kistena | 3 | Olivier Doleuze | Criquette Head | Wertheimer et Frère | 1:11.30 |
| 1997 | Dyhim Diamond | 3 | Guy Guignard | Carlos Laffon-Parias | Salem Suhail | 1:11.80 |
| 1998 | Keos | 4 | Cash Asmussen | John Hammond | Niarchos Family | 1:13.40 |
| 1999 | Seltitude | 3 | Thierry Gillet | John Hammond | NP Bloodstock Ltd | 1:15.10 |
| 2000 | Danger Over | 3 | Thierry Thulliez | Pascal Bary | Khalid Abdullah | 1:12.20 |
| 2001 | Deep Sleep | 4 | Olivier Peslier | André Fabre | Maktoum Al Maktoum | 1:12.20 |
| 2002 | Danehurst | 4 | Seb Sanders | Sir Mark Prescott | Cheveley Park Stud | 1:13.00 |
| 2003 | Soave | 4 | Andreas Boschert | Andreas Trybuhl | Stall Happy End | 1:14.60 |
| 2004 | Miss Emma | 4 | Frédéric Spanu | John Hammond | Takahiro Wada | 1:12.10 |
| 2005 | Miss Emma | 5 | Frédéric Spanu | John Hammond | Takahiro Wada | 1:09.90 |
| 2006 | New Girlfriend | 3 | Julien Augé | Robert Collet | Richard Strauss | 1:10.80 |
| 2007 | Tiza | 5 | Christophe Soumillon | Alain de Royer-Dupré | Seroul / Plersch | 1:13.00 |
| 2008 | Utmost Respect | 4 | Paul Hanagan | Richard Fahey | Rumpole Partnership | 1:14.40 |
| 2009 | Dunkerque | 4 | Dominique Boeuf | Criquette Head-Maarek | Alec Head | 1:15.70 |
| 2010 | Definightly | 4 | Thierry Thulliez | Roger Charlton | Simon & Rosalind Emmet | 1:13.10 |
| 2011 | Iver Bridge Lad | 4 | Michael O'Connell | John Ryan | The Iver Lads | 1:14.10 |
| 2012 | Myasun | 5 | Maxime Guyon | Christian Baillet | Ecurie Jarlan | 1:14.60 |
| 2013 | Kolonel | 4 | Olivier Peslier | Mario Hofer | Stall Helena | 1:15.10 |
| 2014 | Gammarth | 6 | Mickael Barzalona | Henri-Alex Pantall | Gerard Mimouni | 1:13.38 |
| 2015 | Gammarth | 7 | Mickael Barzalona | Henri-Alex Pantall | Gerard Mimouni | 1:13.60 |
| 2016 | The Right Man | 4 | Francois-Xavier Betras | Didier Guillemin | Pegase Bloodstock | 1:11.80 |
| 2017 | The Right Man | 5 | Francois-Xavier Betras | Didier Guillemin | Pegase Bloodstock | 1:10.53 |
| 2018 | Snazzy Jazzy | 3 | Gerald Mosse | Clive Cox | Olive Shaw | 1:12.10 |
| 2019 | Trois Mille | 3 | Alexis Badel | Stephane Cerulis | Stephan Hoffmeister | 1:14.96 |
| 2020 | Brad The Brief (Note: The 2020 race was run at Chantilly) | 3 | Richard Kingscote | Tom Dascombe | Chasemore Farm | 1:16.61 |
| 2021 | Egot (Note: The 2021 race was run at Chantilly) | 3 | Mickael Barzalona | André Fabre | Godolphin | 1:11.96 |

== Earlier winners ==
- 1906: Sourdine
- 1907: Lamaneur
- 1908: Negofol
- 1909: Fils du Vent
- 1910: Fils du Vent
- 1911: Montrose
- 1912: Bugler
- 1913: Sardanapale
- 1914–18: no race
- 1919: Cri du Coeur
- 1920: Samic
- 1921: Hollister
- 1922: São Paulo
- 1923: Rosina
- 1924: Niceas
- 1925: Tapin
- 1926: Rymenhild
- 1927: Mourad
- 1928: Take It Easy
- 1929: Alma Savoia
- 1930: Baoule
- 1931: Clarawood
- 1932: Assuerus
- 1933: Jocrisse
- 1934: Le Cyclone
- 1935: Limac
- 1936: May Wong
- 1937: Pashavitch
- 1938: Iskandar
- 1939–40: no race
- 1941: La Melodie
- 1942: Fine Art
- 1943: Dogat
- 1944: Fine Art
- 1945: Fine Art
- 1946: Vagabond
- 1947: Bir Ackeim
- 1948: Menetrier
- 1949:
- 1950: Sarrau
- 1951: Bel Amour
- 1952:
- 1953: Hurnli
- 1954: Virgule
- 1955: Reinata
- 1956: Palariva
- 1957: Mystic
- 1958: Mon Triomphe
- 1959: Edellic
- 1960: Mincio
- 1961: Opaline
- 1962: L'Épinay
- 1963: Vertueuse
- 1964: Texanita
- 1965: Fantastic Light
- 1966: Ailes du Chant
- 1967: Ancyre
- 1968: Zeddaan
- 1969: Democratie
- 1970: Huntercombe
- 1971: Fireside Chat
- 1972: Calahorra
- 1973: Abergwaun
- 1974: Bayraan
- 1975: Realty
- 1976: Kala Shikari
- 1977: Girl Friend
- 1978: King of Macedon
- 1979: King of Macedon

== See also ==
- List of French flat horse races
