= Zino (horse) =

British Thoroughbred racehorse

- Sire: Welsh Pageant
- Grandsire: Tudor Melody
- Dam: Cyriana
- Damsire: Salvo
- Sex: Stallion
- Foaled: 1979
- Colour: Bay
- Breeder: Citadel Stud Establishment
- Owner: Gerry Oldham
- Trainer: François Boutin
- Jockey: Freddie Head
- Record: 10: 5-2-1
- Earnings: 1,590,473 ff

Major wins
- Critérium de Maisons-Laffitte (1981); 2000 Guineas Stakes (1982)

Zino (1979–1991) was a Thoroughbred racehorse which won the 2000 Guineas Stakes in 1982.

Owned by Gerry Oldham, trained by François Boutin and ridden by Freddie Head, Zino won the 1982 2000 Guineas Stakes at Newmarket, England, beating Wind and Wuthering in a photo-finish, in a time of 1:37.13. Zino is one of eleven winners of the 2000 Guineas to have been trained in France since 1900.

== Pedigree ==
Pedigree of Zino (GB), bay stallion, 1979
Sire Welsh Pageant (FR) 1966	Tudor Melody (GB); 1956	Tudor Minstrel	Owen Tudor*
Sire Welsh Pageant (FR) 1966	Tudor Melody (GB); 1956	Tudor Minstrel	Sansonnet
Sire Welsh Pageant (FR) 1966	Tudor Melody (GB); 1956	Matelda	Dante
Sire Welsh Pageant (FR) 1966	Tudor Melody (GB); 1956	Matelda	Fairly Hot
Sire Welsh Pageant (FR) 1966	Picture Light (FR); 1954	Court Martial	Fair Trial
Sire Welsh Pageant (FR) 1966	Picture Light (FR); 1954	Court Martial	Instantaneous
Sire Welsh Pageant (FR) 1966	Picture Light (FR); 1954	Double Deal	Borealis
Sire Welsh Pageant (FR) 1966	Picture Light (FR); 1954	Double Deal	Picture Play
Dam Cyriana (GB) 1972	Salvo (GB); 1963	Right Royal	Owen Tudor*
Dam Cyriana (GB) 1972	Salvo (GB); 1963	Right Royal	Bastia
Dam Cyriana (GB) 1972	Salvo (GB); 1963	Manera	Macherio
Dam Cyriana (GB) 1972	Salvo (GB); 1963	Manera	Maenza
Dam Cyriana (GB) 1972	Cynara (GB); 1958	Grey Sovereign	Nasrullah
Dam Cyriana (GB) 1972	Cynara (GB); 1958	Grey Sovereign	Kong
Dam Cyriana (GB) 1972	Cynara (GB); 1958	Ladycroft	Portlaw
Dam Cyriana (GB) 1972	Cynara (GB); 1958	Ladycroft	Cosmobelle (Family: 1-n)

* Zino is inbred 4S x 4D to the stallion Owen Tudor, meaning that he appears fourth generation on the sire side of his pedigree, and fourth generation on the dam side of his pedigree.
