= Godetia (horse) =

American-bred Thoroughbred racehorse

- Sire: Sir Ivor
- Grandsire: Sir Gaylord
- Dam: Native Glitter
- Damsire: Native Dancer
- Sex: Mare
- Foaled: 14 April 1976
- Country: United States
- Colour: Chestnut
- Breeder: Whitney Stone
- Owner: Robert Sangster; George W. Strawbridge Jr.
- Trainer: Vincent O'Brien; Jonathan Sheppard
- Record: 11: 5-1-0

Major wins
- Athasi Stakes (1979); Irish 1,000 Guineas (1979); Pretty Polly Stakes (1979); Irish Oaks (1979)

Awards
- Timeform rating 108 p (1978), 119 (1979); Top-rated Irish three-year-old filly (1979)

Godetia (foaled 14 April 1976 – 1994) was an American-bred thoroughbred racehorse and broodmare who won two Irish Classic Races in 1979. Bred in Virginia, she was sold as a yearling and sent to race in Europe. As a two-year-old she showed promise when finishing second on her debut before winning her next race by twelve lengths. In 1979 she was unbeaten in four races in Ireland, taking the Athasi Stakes, Irish 1,000 Guineas, Pretty Polly Stakes and Irish Oaks, but ran poorly when sent to England for The Oaks and Yorkshire Oaks. She returned to race in the United States as a four-year-old but failed to make any impact in three races. As a broodmare she had some success but produced no major winners.

== Background ==
Godetia was a "most attractive" chestnut mare with an elongated diamond-shaped white star and two white socks bred by Whitney Stone at his Morven Stud in Charlottesville, Virginia. Her sire, Sir Ivor was an American-bred colt who was trained in Europe and won The Derby and the Washington, D.C.International in 1968 before standing as a breeding stallion in Kentucky. Sir Ivor's other major winners included Ivanjica, Cloonlara and Bates Motel. Godetia's dam Native Glitter won one minor race but was a full-sister to Shimmy Dancer (winner of the Gazelle Handicap) and a half-sister to Nantallah (sire of Moccasin).

At $60,000, she was the cheapest of seventeen yearling bought in the United States by Irish trainer Vincent O'Brien (who had trained Sir Ivor) and his associates in 1977. The filly raced in the colours of the British businessman Robert Sangster and was taken into training by O'Brien at Ballydoyle in County Tipperary. She was ridden in most of her European races by Lester Piggott.

== Racing career ==
=== 1978: two-year-old season ===
Godetia made her racecourse debut in the Gilltown Stud Stakes, a maiden race over seven furlongs at the Curragh Racecourse in September. Her connections appeared to have little confidence in her chances, as she started a 20/1 outsider and was ridden by Vincent Rossiter, one of the stable's lesser-known jockeys. She challenged for the lead in the final quarter mile and finished second of the eighteen runners behind her stablemate Kalamaika. Ten days later she started 1/2 favourite for a maiden over the same distance at Phoenix Park Racecourse and drew away from her opponents in the last two furlongs to win by twelve lengths from Sister Jinks, a filly who had finished third in the Group Three C. L. Weld Park Stakes.

=== 1979: three-year-old season ===
On her first appearance as a three-year-old, Godetia won the Athasi Stakes over seven furlongs, beating Icancan by two and a half lengths with Fair Davinia in third. On 12 May, Godetia was made the 4/6 favourite against eleven opponents the Irish 1,000 Guineas at the Curragh with the Phoenix Stakes winner Kilijaro (the top-rated two-year-old filly in Ireland in 1978) second choice in the betting on 6/1. Piggott sent the favourite into the lead and tracked across the course to race on the stands side (the left side from the jockeys' viewpoint). In the closing stages she held off several challenges without ever looking in danger of defeat and won by two lengths and a head from La Samanna an Fair Davinia.

On 9 June, Godetia was sent to England and started the strongly-fancied second favourite for the 201st running of the Oaks Stakes over one and a half miles on soft ground at Epsom Downs Racecourse. Although she looked impressive in the paddock before the race she ran very poorly, struggling to match the early pace, dropping from contention at half way and finishing ninth of the fourteen runners behind Scintillate. Godetia was dropped back in distance for the ten furlong Pretty Polly Stakes (then restricted to three-year-olds) at the Curragh and won by six lengths from Fair Davinia and twelve others. On 21 July, the filly was moved back up in distance for the Irish Oaks and started the 6/4 favourite ahead of the Maurice Zilber-trained Producer who had won the Prix de Royaumont and the Prix Chloé as well as finishing third to Dunette and Three Troikas in the Prix de Diane. Piggott sent Godetia into the lead from the start, set a steady pace, quickened at half way, slowed on the final turn and then went hard for home in the straight. Producer emerged as her only serious challenger, but Godetia prevailed by a length with Queen To Conquer taking third ahead of Senorito Poquito. Timeform described Piggott as being "at his formidable tactical best in the race" varying the pace in order to blunt Producer's supposedly superior finishing speed.

Godetia traveled back to England for the Yorkshire Oaks (then restricted to three-year-olds) over one and a half miles at York Racecourse in August. She again attempted to make all the running but was overtaken three furlongs out and weakened rapidly. Piggott eased her down in the closing stages and she finished last of the five runners behind Connaught Bridge, Senorita Poquito, Reprocolor and Britannia's Rule. Before her defeat at York the filly had been sold privately to George W. Strawbridge Jr. for a reported $1,000,000.

=== 1980: four-year-old season ===
In 1980 Godetia was transferred to the United States where she raced in the colours of Strawbridge's Augustin Stables and was trained by Jonathan Sheppard but failed to reproduce her European form. She did not reappear until November and was well-beaten in all three of her races. She finished sixth in an allowance race at Meadowlands, fifth behind The Very One in the Grade III Chrysanthemum Handicap at Laurel Park and ninth in an allowance at Meadowlands.

== Assessment and awards ==
In 1978, the independent Timeform organisation awarded Godetia a rating of 106 p (the "p" indicating that she was probably capable of making significantly more than normal improvement), twenty-six pounds behind their top-rated two-year-old filly Sigy. In their annual Racehorses of 1978 Timeform praised her "great potential" and commented "We shouldn't be surprised if Godetia were to develop into a leading fancy for the One Thousand Guineas".

In 1979 the organisation rated her on 119, fourteen pounds inferior to the top three-year-old filly Three Troikas, commenting that her record was that of a poor traveller, who only showed her best form in Ireland. (An alternative explanation is that she was unsuited to left-handed tracks, viz. Epsom and York. This would explain her relatively inferior form when raced at age 4 in America). In the official Irish Handicap, she was rated level with Kilijaro as the best three-year-old filly. The International Classification rated her the eighth-best filly of her generation in Europe.

== Breeding record ==
Godetia produced at least eight foals and four minor winners between 1984 and 1992. She died in 1994. Her offspring include:

- Castle Creek, a chestnut filly, foaled in 1984, sired by Sharpen Up. Won two of seven races.
- Norquay, colt, 1985, by Arctic Tern. Second on only start.
- Blue Mandolin, chestnut filly, 1986, by The Minstrel. Won once in ten races.
- Shout and Sing, colt, 1987, by The Minstrel. Won the Warren Stakes at Epsom from six races.
- Ministra, chestnut filly, 1988, by Deputy Minister. Unraced.
- River Delta, bay filly, 1990, by Riverman. Won her only race.
- Marshall Ney, bay colt (later gelded), 1991, by Danzig Connection. Failed to win in ten races.
- Fantasy Flyer, bay filly, 1992, by Lear Fan. Unraced.

== Pedigree ==
Pedigree of Godetia (USA), chestnut mare, 1976
Sire Sir Ivor (USA) 1965	Sir Gaylord (USA); 1959	Turn-To	Royal Charger
Sire Sir Ivor (USA) 1965	Sir Gaylord (USA); 1959	Turn-To	Source Sucree
Sire Sir Ivor (USA) 1965	Sir Gaylord (USA); 1959	Somethingroyal	Princequillo
Sire Sir Ivor (USA) 1965	Sir Gaylord (USA); 1959	Somethingroyal	Imperatrice
Sire Sir Ivor (USA) 1965	Attica (USA); 1953	Mr. Trouble	Mahmoud
Sire Sir Ivor (USA) 1965	Attica (USA); 1953	Mr. Trouble	Motto
Sire Sir Ivor (USA) 1965	Attica (USA); 1953	Athenia	Pharamond
Sire Sir Ivor (USA) 1965	Attica (USA); 1953	Athenia	Salaminia
Dam Native Glitter (USA) 1966	Native Dancer (USA); 1950	Polynesian	Unbreakable
Dam Native Glitter (USA) 1966	Native Dancer (USA); 1950	Polynesian	Black Polly
Dam Native Glitter (USA) 1966	Native Dancer (USA); 1950	Geisha	Discovery
Dam Native Glitter (USA) 1966	Native Dancer (USA); 1950	Geisha	Miyako
Dam Native Glitter (USA) 1966	Shimmer (USA); 1945	Flares	Gallant Fox
Dam Native Glitter (USA) 1966	Shimmer (USA); 1945	Flares	Flambino
Dam Native Glitter (USA) 1966	Shimmer (USA); 1945	Broad Ripple	Stimulus
Dam Native Glitter (USA) 1966	Shimmer (USA); 1945	Broad Ripple	Hocus Pocus (Family:6-a)
