= Lambert Simnel (horse) =

British-bred Thoroughbred racehorse

- Sire: Fair Trial
- Grandsire: Fairway
- Dam: Simnel
- Damsire: Blandford
- Sex: Stallion
- Foaled: 1938
- Country: United Kingdom
- Colour: Bay
- Breeder: Hugh Grosvenor, 2nd Duke of Westminster
- Owner: Hugh Grosvenor, 2nd Duke of Westminster
- Trainer: Fred Templeman
- Record: 9: 3-2-0 (probably incomplete)
- Earnings: £3,045

Major wins
- 2000 Guineas Stakes (1941)

Lambert Simnel (1938–1952) was a British Thoroughbred racehorse and sire, who raced during World War II and was best known for winning the classic 2000 Guineas in 1941. As a two-year-old he won once and finished second in the Dewhurst Stakes. In the following spring he won the 2000 Guineas, beating a field which included the subsequent Classic winners Owen Tudor and Sun Castle. He was beaten when favourite for the Derby and finished unplaced in the St Leger. He won once as a four-year-old in 1942 before being retired to stud. He stood as a breeding stallion in England and Argentina with limited success before his death in 1952.

== Background ==
Lambert Simnel was a bay horse, bred by his owner Hugh Grosvenor, 2nd Duke of Westminster. He was from the first crop of foals sired by Fair Trial who won the Queen Anne Stakes in 1935 before becoming a highly successful breeding stallion. His other progeny included the classic winners Court Martial, Festoon, and Palestine. Lambert Simnel's dam, Simnel was a moderate racehorse with a relatively undistinguished pedigree but was distantly related to Stargrass who became the grand-dam of the Exbury.

Lambert Simnel's racing career took place during World War II. During the war, horse racing in Britain was subject to many restrictions. Several major racecourses, including Epsom and Doncaster, were closed for the duration of the conflict, either for safety reasons, or because they were being used by the military. Many important races were rescheduled to new dates and venues, often at short notice, and all five of the Classics were usually run at Newmarket.

The Duke of Westminster named his colt after a fifteenth century pretender and sent him into training with Fred Templeman at Lambourn in Berkshire. Templeman had been a successful jockey, riding major winners including Grand Parade and Irish Elegance before setting up as a trainer in 1921.

== Racing career ==
=== 1940: two-year-old season ===
As a two-year-old, Lambert Simnel ran three times and won one race. He produced his most notable effort when finishing second to the filly Fettes in the Dewhurst Stakes at Newmarket Racecourse.

=== 1941: three-year-old season ===
On 30 April 1941, Lambert Simnel contested the 133rd running of the 2000 Guineas which was run over the July course at Newmarket rather than its traditional home on the Rowley Mile. He was ridden by Charlie Elliott and started at odds of 10/1 in a field of nineteen runners with the Fred Darling-trained Owen Tudor being made favourite. Lambert Simnel won by two lengths from Morogoro (the favourite's stable companion), with Sun Castle a length and a half away in third and Owen Tudor in fifth.

In the New Derby, run over one and a half miles at the same course on 18 June, Lambert Simnel started 4/1 favourite ahead of Sun Castle and Morogoro in a twenty-runner field. He never looked likely to win and finished tenth behind Owen Tudor. Lambert Simnel was brought back in distance for the one-mile St James's Palace Stakes, run that year at Newmarket, and produced a better effort, finishing second to Orthodox. With Doncaster Racecourse unavailable, a substitute "New St Leger" was run over one and three quarter miles at Manchester on 6 September. Lambert Simnel finished unplaced behind Sun Castle.

At the end of the 1941 season, Lambert Simnel was offered for sale and bought for 2,500 guineas by Mrs H. G. Thurston.

=== 1942: four-year-old season ===
Lambert Simnel remained in training as a four-year-old and won one of his two races.

== Assessment ==
In their book A Century of Champions, based on a modified version of the Timeform system, John Randall and Tony Morris rated Lambert Simnel an "inferior" winner of the 2000 Guineas.

== Stud record ==
Lambert Simnel was retired from racing to become a breeding stallion. He stood in England for several years with moderate success before being exported to Argentina where he died in 1952.

== Pedigree ==
Pedigree of Lambert Simnel (GB), bay stallion, 1938
Sire Fair Trial (GB) 1932	Fairway (GB); 1925	Phalaris	Polymelus
Sire Fair Trial (GB) 1932	Fairway (GB); 1925	Phalaris	Bromus
Sire Fair Trial (GB) 1932	Fairway (GB); 1925	Scapa Flow	Chaucer
Sire Fair Trial (GB) 1932	Fairway (GB); 1925	Scapa Flow	Anchora
Sire Fair Trial (GB) 1932	Lady Juror (GB); 1919	Son-In-Law	Dark Ronald
Sire Fair Trial (GB) 1932	Lady Juror (GB); 1919	Son-In-Law	Mother In Law
Sire Fair Trial (GB) 1932	Lady Juror (GB); 1919	Lady Josephine	Sundridge
Sire Fair Trial (GB) 1932	Lady Juror (GB); 1919	Lady Josephine	Americus Girl
Dam Simnel (GB) 1932	Blandford (GB); 1919	Swynford	John o'Gaunt
Dam Simnel (GB) 1932	Blandford (GB); 1919	Swynford	Canterbury Pilgrim
Dam Simnel (GB) 1932	Blandford (GB); 1919	Blanche	White Eagle
Dam Simnel (GB) 1932	Blandford (GB); 1919	Blanche	Black Cherry
Dam Simnel (GB) 1932	Nicest (GB); 1924	Chaucer	St Simon
Dam Simnel (GB) 1932	Nicest (GB); 1924	Chaucer	Canterbury Pilgrim
Dam Simnel (GB) 1932	Nicest (GB); 1924	Nice	Minoru
Dam Simnel (GB) 1932	Nicest (GB); 1924	Nice	Nevolnice (Family: 2-f)

- Lambert Simnel was inbred 3 x 4 to Chaucer, meaning that this stallion appears in both the third and fourth generation of his pedigree.
