= Jeremy Tree =

British Thoroughbred racehorse trainer (1925–1993)

Personal information
- Born: 21 December 1925
- Died: 7 March 1993 (aged 67)
- Occupation: Trainer

Horse racing career
- Sport: Horse racing

Major racing wins
- British Classic Race wins: 2,000 Guineas (2); Epsom Oaks (2)

Significant horses
- Only for Life, Juliette Marny, Scintillate, Known Fact, Sharpo, Rainbow Quest, Danehill, Quest for Fame

Arthur Jeremy Tree (21 December 1925 – 7 March 1993) was a British Thoroughbred racehorse trainer.

== Background ==
Born into a prominent London family, Tree was always known by his middle name, Jeremy. His father was Ronald Tree, an American-born British journalist, investor and Conservative Member of Parliament (MP) for Harborough in Leicestershire. His mother, Nancy Lancaster, was a niece of the MP Nancy Astor, through whom young Jeremy would be introduced to the sport of Thoroughbred racing. Jeremy Tree was a paternal half-brother of the model Penelope Tree and full-brother of Michael Lambert Tree.

== Racing career ==
Jeremy Tree embarked on a career in racing in 1947 after inheriting the bloodstock of his uncle, Peter Beatty, and initially worked as assistant to the trainer Richard Warden. He began training on his own at Newmarket Racecourse in 1952, then the following year relocated to stables at Beckhampton, Wiltshire. He won his first Classic in 1963 when Only for Life captured the 2,000 Guineas Stakes. He went on to win three more classics, taking The Oaks with Juliette Marny in 1975 and Scintillate in 1979, then a second 2,000 Guineas Stakes in 1980 with Known Fact. Among his other top runners, Jeremy Tree trained Rainbow Quest to wins in the 1985 Coronation Cup and the Prix de l'Arc de Triomphe.

During his career, Jeremy Tree conditioned horses for prominent owners such as Charles W. Engelhard, Jr., Prince Khalid Abdullah and American John Hay Whitney.

== Retirement ==
After 43 years in racing, Jeremy Tree retired in 1989 to his home in Beckhampton. During retirement he suffered ill-health and died in 1993 aged 67.
