= Sing Sing (horse) =

British-bred Thoroughbred racehorse

- Sire: Tudor Minstrel
- Grandsire: Owen Tudor
- Dam: Agin the Law
- Damsire: Portlaw
- Sex: Stallion
- Foaled: 1957
- Country: United Kingdom
- Colour: Dark bay
- Breeder: W J Stirling
- Owner: W J Stirling
- Trainer: Jack Watts
- Record: 9: 6-2-0
- Earnings: £12,834

Major wins
- National Breeders' Produce Stakes (1959); Cornwallis Stakes (1959)

Awards
- Top-rated British two-year-old (1959); Timeform top-rated two-year-old (1959); Timeform rating: 134

Sing Sing (1957 – 22 April 1972) was a British Thoroughbred racehorse and sire. He was the leading British two-year-old of 1959, when he was unbeaten in six races including the National Breeders' Produce Stakes and the Cornwallis Stakes. As a three-year-old he failed to win in three races, being narrowly beaten in the King's Stand Stakes and the King George Stakes. He was then retired to stud where he had considerable success as a sire of sprinters. He died in 1972.

== Background ==
Sing Sing was a powerfully built dark bay horse with a white blaze standing 16.1 hands high bred by his owner W. J. Stirling. He was sired by Tudor Minstrel, the winner of the 2000 Guineas in 1947 and the leading colt of his generation in Britain. Tudor Minstrel's other progeny included the Kentucky Derby winner Tomy Lee. His dam Agin the Law was a great-granddaughter on the influential broodmare whose other descendants included Tourbillon, Darshaan, Akiyda and Sinndar. Stirling sent his horse into training with J F Watts at his Wroughton House stable in Newmarket.

== Racing career ==
=== 1959: two-year-old season ===
Sing Sing began his racing career by winning the Pampisford Stakes at Newmarket Racecourse and followed up by winning the Scarborough Stakes at Doncaster. He was moved up in class for the National Stakes over five furlongs at Sandown Park Racecourse and won from Redgauntlet and Lombard. He won the Prince of Wales's Stakes at York Racecourse and the Rous Stakes before contesting the Cornwallis Stakes over five furlongs at Ascot on 10 October. Ridden by the champion jockey Doug Smith he started at odds of 4/6 and won from Queensberry and Sound Track.

=== 1960: three-year-old season ===
Sing Sing did not race until June, when he ran in the King's Stand Stakes at Royal Ascot. He started odds-on favourite but after leading for most of the way he was caught in the closing strides and beaten a neck by Sound Track. At Goodwood Racecourse Sing Sing was made odds-on favourite for the King George Stakes. In a repeat of his Ascot run he led until the final stages before being overtaken by the four-year-old Bleep Bleep. On his final appearance at York in August Sing Sing finished unplaced behind Bleep Bleep in the Nunthorpe Stakes.

== Assessment ==
In the 1959 Free Handicap, an official assessment of the best two-year-olds to race in Britain, Sing Sing was the top-rated juvenile of the year by a margin of three pounds. The independent Timeform organisation awarded Sing Sing a rating of 134, making him the best two-year-old of 1959. In their book, A Century of Champions, based on the Timeform rating system, John Randall and Tony Morris rated Sing Sing as the twenty-eighth best two-year-old trained in Britain and Ireland in the 20th century.

== Stud record ==
Sing Sing was retired from racing to become a breeding stallion and had a successful stud career until his death on 22 April 1972 from hemorrhage related to enteritis. The best of his offspring, most of which were specialist sprinters, included,

- Celtic Song (bay colt 1963), won Champagne Stakes
- Manacle (bay colt 1964), sire of Moorestyle
- Klaizia (bay filly 1965), dam of Lypheor who sired Royal Heroine and Tolomeo
- Jukebox (bay colt 1966), won Stewards' Cup
- Song (bay colt 1966), won Temple Stakes, King's Stand Stakes, Diadem Stakes, sire of Lochsong
- Mummy's Pet (bay colt 1968), won Temple Stakes sire of Mister Wonderful (American Handicap), and the undefeated Precocious
- Singing Bede (bay colt 1969), won King George Stakes, Palace House Stakes
- African Sky (bay colt 1970), won Prix de la Forêt, sire of Kilijaro and African Song
- Saulingo (brown colt 1970), won Temple Stakes, Prix du Gros Chêne
- Averof (brown colt 1971), won St James's Palace Stakes

== Sire line tree ==
- Sing Sing
  - Celtic Song
  - Manacle
    - Moorestyle
      - Lockton
  - Jukebox
    - Nickel King
      - Prince Panache
  - Song
  - Mummy's Pet
    - Precocious
      - Elbio
    - Mister Wonderful
  - Singing Bede
  - African Sky
    - African Song
  - Saulingo
  - Averof

== Pedigree ==
Pedigree of Sing Sing (GB), dark bay stallion, 1957
Sire Tudor Minstrel (GB) 1944	Owen Tudor (GB); 1938	Hyperion	Gainsborough
Sire Tudor Minstrel (GB) 1944	Owen Tudor (GB); 1938	Hyperion	Selene
Sire Tudor Minstrel (GB) 1944	Owen Tudor (GB); 1938	Mary Tudor	Pharos
Sire Tudor Minstrel (GB) 1944	Owen Tudor (GB); 1938	Mary Tudor	Anna Bolena
Sire Tudor Minstrel (GB) 1944	Sansonnet (GB); 1933	Sansovino	Swynford
Sire Tudor Minstrel (GB) 1944	Sansonnet (GB); 1933	Sansovino	Gondolette
Sire Tudor Minstrel (GB) 1944	Sansonnet (GB); 1933	Lady Juror	Son-in-Law
Sire Tudor Minstrel (GB) 1944	Sansonnet (GB); 1933	Lady Juror	Lady Josephine
Dam Agin the Law (GB) 1946	Portlaw (GB); 1928	Beresford	Friar Marcus
Dam Agin the Law (GB) 1946	Portlaw (GB); 1928	Beresford	Bayberry
Dam Agin the Law (GB) 1946	Portlaw (GB); 1928	Portree	Stefan the Great
Dam Agin the Law (GB) 1946	Portlaw (GB); 1928	Portree	Saddlemark
Dam Agin the Law (GB) 1946	Revolte (FR); 1933	Xandover	Condover
Dam Agin the Law (GB) 1946	Revolte (FR); 1933	Xandover	Xanthene
Dam Agin the Law (GB) 1946	Revolte (FR); 1933	Sheba	Durbar
Dam Agin the Law (GB) 1946	Revolte (FR); 1933	Sheba	Banshee (Family: 13-c)
