= Owen Tudor (horse) =

British-bred Thoroughbred racehorse

- Sire: Hyperion
- Grandsire: Gainsborough
- Dam: Mary Tudor II
- Damsire: Pharos
- Sex: Stallion
- Foaled: 1938 Lordship Stud, Newmarket
- Country: United Kingdom
- Colour: Bay
- Breeder: Catherine Macdonald-Buchanan
- Owner: Catherine Macdonald-Buchanan
- Trainer: Fred Darling
- Record: 13: 6-1-0
- Earnings: £

Major wins
- New Derby (1941); Newmarket Gold Cup (1942)

Owen Tudor (1938–1966) was a British Thoroughbred racehorse and sire. In a career that lasted from 1940 to 1942 he ran twelve times and won six races. His most important win came as a three-year-old in the summer of 1941 when he won the "New Derby" at Newmarket. During the Second World War many British racecourses were closed either for safety reasons or because the land was needed for military use. Epsom Downs Racecourse was used throughout the war for an anti-aircraft battery, leading to the creation of a substitute or "New" version of the race. Owen Tudor went on to win a substitute "Ascot Gold Cup" at Newmarket in 1942. At the end of that season he was retired to stud where he had considerable success as a sire of winners.

== Background ==
Owen Tudor was bred by his owner, Catherine Macdonald-Buchanan and born at Lordship Stud, Newmarket. Macdonald-Buchanan had inherited considerable racing and breeding interests when her father, Lord Woolavington, died in 1935. The bay colt was sired by Hyperion out of the French-bred mare Mary Tudor II. Hyperion was an outstanding racehorse who won The Derby and the St Leger in 1933. He went on to become a successful and influential stallion, being Leading sire in Great Britain and Ireland on six occasions. Mary Tudor II, who produced five winners apart from Owen Tudor, had won the Poule d'Essai des Pouliches and finished second in the Prix de Diane in 1934.

Owen Tudor was sent into training with Fred Darling at Beckhampton, Wiltshire and became his trainer’s seventh and last Derby winner.

== Racing career ==
=== 1940: two-year-old season ===
Owen Tudor began his racing career by winning the Salisbury Stakes at Salisbury. In his two other races he was sent to Newmarket where he finished unplaced in the Criterion Stakes and second in the Boscawen Stakes. In the Free Handicap, a ranking of the year’s best two-year-olds, Owen Tudor was rated eighth behind Poise, who as a gelding was ineligible for the Classics.

=== 1941: three-year-old season ===
Owen Tudor began his three-year-old campaign with a win in the Column Produce Stakes. He then started favourite for the 2000 Guineas but finished fifth of the nineteen runners behind Lambert Simnel. Another disappointment followed when he was well beaten in a race at Salisbury. As a result, he was not considered among the leading contenders for the New Derby, especially after a poor performance in a public exercise gallop on 5 June. One of those who kept faith in Owen Tudor was the Champion Jockey Gordon Richards who insisted that the colt would have been his Derby choice had he not been prevented from riding by injury.

Fred Darling saddled five of the twenty runners for the New Derby on 18 June, with Owen Tudor being one of the least fancied at 25/1. The ride on Owen Tudor went to the experienced northern jockey William "Billy" Nevett, who was given leave from serving as a private in the Royal Army Ordnance Corps to take the mount. Although the crowds could not compare with those at Epsom, an estimated 50,000 were in attendance, and the facilities at Newmarket were inadequate for the numbers, resulting in many spectators spending the night in the open. The size of the gathering also provoked security concerns, leading the Royal Air Force to fly almost constant patrol missions in the area. Two furlongs from the finish, the race was wide open, with the horses spread across the wide Newmarket straight. Owen Tudor, who was a 25 to 1 chance, took the lead soon afterwards and pulled ahead to win, beating his more fancied stable companion Morogoro (11 to 2 chance) by one and a half lengths.

Owen Tudor was then given a planned break of two months before returning in August, when he finished fourth to Sun Castle in a race at Newbury. He then disappointed again in the "New St Leger", run at Manchester Racecourse as Doncaster was unavailable, finishing unplaced behind Sun Castle and Chateau Larose. In October the colt came back to form to beat Chateau Larose over fourteen furlongs in the "Newmarket St Leger" (not an official substitute race).

=== 1942: four-year-old season ===
Owen Tudor stayed in training at four and began by winning the ten furlong Trial Plate at Salisbury, ridden by Gordon Richards. In July he returned to Salisbury but finished sixth of the seven runners behind Mazarin in the Quidhampton Plate over one and a half miles. On his final start, Owen Tudor ran in the Newmarket Gold Cup a substitute for the Ascot Gold Cup run over two and a quarter miles. Starting the 5/2 favourite he took the lead at half way and won the race easily from the filly Afterthought with Lovely Trim third. He was then retired to stud.

== Assessment ==
In their book A Century of Champions, John Randall and Tony Morris rated Owen Tudor the sixtieth best British horse of the 20th Century and the second best Derby winner of the 1940s.

The official British Handicapper rated Owen Tudor the best three-year-old of 1941, three pounds ahead of Sun Castle.

== Stud career ==
Owen Tudor was never Champion sire but had a highly successful stud career. Although he had shown his best form in long distance races he sired outstanding performers with a range of aptitudes including the sprinter Abernant, the miler Tudor Minstrel and the middle distance performers Tudor Era and Right Royal. Owen Tudor was retired from stud duties in 1960 and died in 1966 at the age of twenty-eight.

== Sire line tree ==
- Owen Tudor
  - Tudor Minstrel
    - Buckhound
      - Royal Buck
        - Royal Frolic
    - King Of The Tudors
      - Henry The Seventh
        - Luciano
      - Crocket
        - Mannsfeld
      - Golden Ruler
        - Hard Work
    - Poona
    - Will Somers
      - Balidar
        - Bolkonski
        - Young Generation
      - Pentotal
    - Sallymount
    - Tomy Lee
      - Jeep Driver
    - Tudor Melody
      - Kashmir
        - Blue Cashmere
        - Moulines
        - Lightning
      - Tudor Music
        - Orchestra
        - To-Agori-Mou
      - Welsh Pageant
        - Welsh Chanter
        - Zino
        - Longboat
        - Welnor
      - Tarim
    - Sing Sing
      - Celtic Song
      - Manacle
        - Moorestyle
      - Jukebox
        - Nickel King
      - Song
      - Mummy's Pet
        - Precocious
        - Mister Wonderful
      - Singing Bede
      - African Sky
        - African Song
      - Saulingo
      - Averof
  - Abernant
    - Thin Ice
    - Aberli
    - Welsh Rake
    - Abgar
      - Carlsberg
    - Zahedan
  - Eplenor
  - Tudor Era
  - Right Royal
    - Salvo
    - Ruysdael
    - Rangong
      - Hyperno
      - Ring the Bell
        - Lord Gyllene
    - In The Purple
      - Gold and Black
    - Prince Regent
    - Politico
      - Party Politics
    - Kambalda
      - Miinnehoma
    - Irish

== Pedigree ==
Pedigree of Owen Tudor (GB), bay stallion, 1938
Sire Hyperion (GB) 1930	Gainsborough; 1915	Bayardo	Bay Ronald*
Sire Hyperion (GB) 1930	Gainsborough; 1915	Bayardo	Galicia
Sire Hyperion (GB) 1930	Gainsborough; 1915	Rosedrop	St Frusquin*
Sire Hyperion (GB) 1930	Gainsborough; 1915	Rosedrop	Rosaline
Sire Hyperion (GB) 1930	Selene; 1919	Chaucer*	St Simon*
Sire Hyperion (GB) 1930	Selene; 1919	Chaucer*	Canterbury Pilgrim*
Sire Hyperion (GB) 1930	Selene; 1919	Serenissima	Minoru
Sire Hyperion (GB) 1930	Selene; 1919	Serenissima	Gondolette
Dam Mary Tudor II (FR) 1931	Pharos; 1920	Phalaris	Polymelus
Dam Mary Tudor II (FR) 1931	Pharos; 1920	Phalaris	Bromus
Dam Mary Tudor II (FR) 1931	Pharos; 1920	Scapa Flow	Chaucer*
Dam Mary Tudor II (FR) 1931	Pharos; 1920	Scapa Flow	Anchora
Dam Mary Tudor II (FR) 1931	Anna Bolena; 1920	Teddy	Ajax
Dam Mary Tudor II (FR) 1931	Anna Bolena; 1920	Teddy	Rondeau*
Dam Mary Tudor II (FR) 1931	Anna Bolena; 1920	Queen Elizabeth	Wargrave
Dam Mary Tudor II (FR) 1931	Anna Bolena; 1920	Queen Elizabeth	New Guinea (Family: 10)

* Owen Tudor is inbred 3S x 4D to the stallion Chaucer, meaning that he appears third generation on the sire side of his pedigree, and fourth generation on the dam side of his pedigree.

* Owen Tudor is inbred 5S x 4S x 5D to the stallion St Simon, meaning that he appears fifth generation (via St Frusquin) and fourth generation on the sire side of his pedigree, and fifth generation (via Chaucer) on the dam side of his pedigree.

* Owen Tudor is inbred 4S x 5D to the stallion Bay Ronald, meaning that he appears fourth generation on the sire side of his pedigree, and fifth generation (via Rondeau) on the dam side of his pedigree.
