= Moorestyle =

British-bred Thoroughbred racehorse (1977–1984)

- Racing silks of Moores International Furnishings Ltd
- Sire: Manacle
- Grandsire: Sing Sing
- Dam: Guiding Star
- Damsire: Reliance
- Sex: Stallion
- Foaled: 27 April 1977
- Country: United Kingdom
- Colour: Bay
- Breeder: John Parker
- Owner: Moores International Furnishings Ltd
- Trainer: Robert Armstrong
- Record: 21:13-5-2

Major wins
- European Free Handicap (1980); Norwest Holst Trophy (1980); July Cup (1980); Haydock Sprint Cup (1980); Prix de l'Abbaye (1980); Challenge Stakes (1980, 1981); Prix de la Forêt (1980, 1981); Prix Maurice de Gheest (1981); Diadem Stakes (1981)

Awards
- British Horse of the Year (1980); Top-rated European racehorse (1980); Timeform top-rated horse (1980); Timeform rating: 137 in 1980, 132 in 1981

Honours
- Mooretyle Convivial Maiden Stakes at York Racecourse.
- Last updated on 26 September 2023

Moorestyle (1977–1984) was a British Thoroughbred racehorse and sire. He was unfashionably bred, sold cheaply as a yearling and began his career in minor races. As a three-year-old, however, he improved to become one of the outstanding British sprinters of the post-war era and was named the best horse of the year in Europe by all the major rating organisations. He was also an excellent horse over seven furlongs. Moorestyle's wins in 1980 included the July Cup, the Haydock Sprint Cup, the Prix de l'Abbaye and the Prix de la Forêt. He had further successes as a four-year-old and was retired to stud at the end of 1981. The horse had little opportunity to prove himself as a stallion, dying of grass sickness in 1984.

== Background ==
Moorestyle was a bay horse bred in England by John Parker. He was sired by Manacle out of the Swedish-bred mare Guiding Star. Manacle was a sprinter whose most notable other offspring was Mendip Man, who dead-heated for first place in the Prix de l'Abbaye in 1976. As a yearling Moorestyle was bought for 4,000 guineas by representatives of Moores International Furnishing and was named to promote the company's products. The colt was sent into training with Robert Armstrong at Newmarket, Suffolk, and was ridden in most of his races by Armstrong's brother-in-law Lester Piggott.

== Racing career ==
Moorestye ran five times as a two-year-old, winning twice and finishing second twice without racing in top class competition. On his first start as a three-year-old he won the Free Handicap over seven furlongs and was then stepped up to Group one level for the first time when he was sent to France to contest the Poule d'Essai des Poulains. Racing over 1600 metres] (one mile) for the first time he finished a close second to In Fijar, ahead of the subsequent Washington, D.C. International Stakes winner Argument. On his return to England, Moorestyle won the valuable Norwest Holst Trophy off top weight, a handicap race over seven furlongs at York Racecourse in May.

In the summer of 1980, Moorestyle returned to sprint distances when he ran in the July Cup over six furlongs at Newmarket. He took the lead a quarter mile from the finish and won from Vaigly Great and Sharpo. In the following month he finished second to Boitron in the Prix Maurice de Gheest, in which he was attempting to concede weight to the four-year-old winner. The multiple Group One winner Kilijaro finished third. In autumn, Moorestyle returned to England and won the Sprint Cup (then a Group Two race), beating Kampala and King of Spain and the Challenge Stakes at Newmarket. In France he won the Prix de l'Abbaye over 1000 metres (beating Sharpo) and the Prix de la Foret over 1400 metres.

Moorestyle remained in training as a four-year-old in 1981. Before the start of the season, Moores Furnishings sold a half share in the horse to the British National Stud. His early season was disrupted when he was injured in training incident involving Derby contender Beldale Flutter. In the summer he was beaten by Marwell in the July Cup, by Sharpo in the Nunthorpe Stakes and by To-Agori-Mou in the Waterford Crystal Mile. He returned to winning ways in the Prix Maurice de Gheest and, in the autumn, in the Diadem Stakes and Challenge Stakes before ending his career with four-length win in the Prix de la Forêt.

== Assessment ==
In 1980 the title of British Horse of the Year was decided by a poll of racing journalists conducted by the Racegoers' Club. Moorestyle received 23 of the 31 votes, becoming the first sprinter to win the award since its institution in 1959.

In the International Classification, compiled by the official handicappers of Britain, France and Ireland, Moorestyle was the highest-rated horse of 1980, one pound ahead of Ela-Mana-Mou and Argument.

The independent Timeform organisation awarded Moorestyle a rating of 137 in 1980, making him the highest-rated horse of the year and the equal fourteenth highest rated horse since the organisation began publishing ratings in 1947. In the remainder of the decade his rating was only surpassed by Shergar, Dancing Brave and Reference Point.

In their book, A Century of Champions, based on the Timeform rating system, John Randall and Tony Morris rated Moorestyle the eighth best British or Irish sprinter of the 20th century.

== Stud record ==
Moorestyle was retired to the British National Stud but made little impact as a breeding stallion. He died in 1984 after contracting grass sickness. The best of his progeny was Lockton, a colt who won the National Stakes as a two-year-old and later became a successful stallion in Turkey.

== Pedigree ==
Pedigree of Moorestyle (GB), bay stallion, 1977
Sire Manacle (GB) 1964	Sing Sing; 1957	Tudor Minstrel	Owen Tudor
Sire Manacle (GB) 1964	Sing Sing; 1957	Tudor Minstrel	Sansonnet
Sire Manacle (GB) 1964	Sing Sing; 1957	Agin the Law	Portlaw
Sire Manacle (GB) 1964	Sing Sing; 1957	Agin the Law	Revolte
Sire Manacle (GB) 1964	Hard and Fast; 1957	Hard Sauce	Ardan
Sire Manacle (GB) 1964	Hard and Fast; 1957	Hard Sauce	Saucy Bella
Sire Manacle (GB) 1964	Hard and Fast; 1957	Boodley	Borealis
Sire Manacle (GB) 1964	Hard and Fast; 1957	Boodley	Estrellita
Dam Guiding Star (SWE) 1969	Reliance; 1962	Tantieme	Deux-Pour-Cent
Dam Guiding Star (SWE) 1969	Reliance; 1962	Tantieme	Terka
Dam Guiding Star (SWE) 1969	Reliance; 1962	Relance	Relic
Dam Guiding Star (SWE) 1969	Reliance; 1962	Relance	Polaire
Dam Guiding Star (SWE) 1969	Star of Bethlehem; 1959	Arctic Star	Nearco
Dam Guiding Star (SWE) 1969	Star of Bethlehem; 1959	Arctic Star	Serena
Dam Guiding Star (SWE) 1969	Star of Bethlehem; 1959	Merry Xmas	Chamossaire
Dam Guiding Star (SWE) 1969	Star of Bethlehem; 1959	Merry Xmas	Merry Perrin (Family:5-j)
