= Mummy's Pet =

British-bred Thoroughbred racehorse

- Breed: Thoroughbred
- Sire: Sing Sing
- Grandsire: Tudor Minstrel
- Dam: Money For Nothing
- Damsire: Grey Sovereign
- Sex: Stallion
- Foaled: 1968
- Country: Great Britain
- Color: Chestnut

Mummy's Pet (1968-1986) was a Thoroughbred racehorse by Sing Sing and out of Money for Nothing.

== Life ==
Mummy's Pet had 11 starts, his big wins consisting of the Flying Childers Stakes, Sandown's Temple Stakes, and Ascot's Hyperion Stakes. He was retired to become a breeding stallion in 1972, siring champions in Great Britain and Ireland.

Mummy's Pet died in 1986 in England.
