= Flying Childers Stakes =

Flat horse race in Britain

- Class: Group 2
- Location: Doncaster Racecourse; Doncaster, England
- Inaugurated: 1967
- Race type: Flat / Thoroughbred
- Sponsor: Carlsberg
- Website: Doncaster

Race information
- Distance: 5f 3y (1,008 metres)
- Surface: Turf
- Track: Straight
- Qualification: Two-year-olds
- Weight: 9 st 3 lb Allowances; 3 lb for fillies
- Purse: £130,000 (2025); 1st: £73,723

Flying Childers Stakes
2026
Final Objective	Crownbreaker	Flann Sunna

Previous years
2025
Revival Power	Kansas	Dickensian
2024
Aesterius	Big Mojo	Magnum Force
2023
Big Evs	Flora Of Bermuda	Rosario
2022
Trillium	The Platinum Queen	Crispy Cat
2021
Caturra	Armor	Corazon

2020-2011
2020
Ubettabelieveit	Sacred	Measure Of Magic
2019
A'ali	Dream Shot	Wheels On Fire
2018
Soldier's Call	Well Done Fox	Gossamer Wings
2017
Heartache	Havana Grey	May Girl
2016
Ardad	The Last Lion	Legendary Lunch
2015
Gutaifan	Ornate	Log Out Island
2014
Beacon	Astrophysics	Accepted
2013
Green Door	Wind Fire	Extortionist
2012
Sir Prancealot	Bungle Inthejungle	Sound Of Guns
2011
Requinto	Burwaaz	Caledonia Lady

2010-2001
2010
Zebedee	Dinkum Diamond	New Planet
2009
Sand Vixen	Bould Mover	Mister Manannan
2008
Madame Trop Vite	Anglezarke	Mythical Border
2007
Fleeting Spirit	Spirit Of Sharjah	Cute Ass
2006
Wi Dud	Bahama Mama	Hoh Mike
2005
Godfrey Street	Hunter Street	River Thames
2004
Chateau Istana	Tournedos	Kissing Lights
2003
Howick Falls	China Eyes	Nights Cross
2002
Wunders Dream	Revenue	Speed Cop
2001
Saddad	Swiss Lake	Wishmaster

2000-1991
2000
Superstar Leo	Misty Eyed	Zilch
1999
Mrs P	Emerald Peace	Magic Of Love
1998
Sheer Viking	Borromini	Red Prairie
1997
Land Of Dreams	Tippitt Boy	Titanic
1996
Easycall	Compton Place	Deep Finesse
1995
Cayman Kai	Mubhij	Lucky Lionel
1994
Raah Algharb	Mind Games	Millstream
1993
Imperial Bailiwick	Great Deeds	Selhurstpark Flyer
1992
Poker Chip	Saint Express	Satank
1991
Paris House	Power Lake	Colway Bold

1990-1988
1990
Distinctly North	Mujadil	Vintage Only
1988
Shuttlecock Corner	Kerrera	Almost Blue

The Flying Childers Stakes is a Group 2 flat horse race in Great Britain open to two-year-old horses. It is run at Doncaster over a distance of 5 furlongs and 3 yards (1,008 metres), and it is scheduled to take place each year in September.

== History ==
The event is named after Flying Childers, a famous 18th-century racehorse bred at Carr House near Doncaster. It was established in 1967, and it was originally called the Norfolk Stakes. It was renamed when a different race became known as the Norfolk Stakes in 1973, and from this point it held Group 1 status. It was downgraded to Group 2 in 1979.

The Flying Childers Stakes is currently run on the second day of Doncaster's four-day St Leger Festival, the day before the St Leger Stakes.

== Records ==
Leading jockey (6 wins):

- Frankie Dettori - Howick Falls (2003), Fleeting Spirit (2007), Sand Vixen (2009), Gutaifan (2015), Ardad (2016), A'ali (2019)

Leading trainer (5 wins):

- Sir Michael Stoute – Music Maestro (1977), Marwell (1980), Green Desert (1985), Raah Algharb (1994), Saddad (2001)

== Winners ==
Year	Winner	Jockey	Trainer	Time
1967	D'Urberville	Jimmy Lindley	Jeremy Tree	0:58.40
1968	Tower Walk	Taffy Thomas	Geoffrey Barling	1:02.20
1969	Tribal Chief	Lester Piggott	Brian Swift	1:02.00
1970	Mummy's Pet	Geoff Lewis	John Sutcliffe, Jr.	1:00.20
1971	Rose Dubarry	Tony Murray	Tom Waugh	0:58.70
1972	Marble Arch	Lester Piggott	Ted Curtin	1:02.81
1973	Gentle Thoughts	Lester Piggott	Ted Curtin	1:00.81
1974	Hot Spark	Lester Piggott	Dermot Weld	1:01.75
1975	Hittite Glory	Frankie Durr	Scobie Breasley	1:01.02
1976	Mandrake Major	Willie Carson	Denys Smith	1:02.76
1977	Music Maestro	Greville Starkey	Michael Stoute	1:02.05
1978	Devon Ditty	Greville Starkey	Harry Thomson Jones	1:01.82
1979	Abeer	Steve Cauthen	Jeremy Tree	0:59.29
1980	Marwell	Greville Starkey	Michael Stoute	1:01.44
1981	Peterhof	Edward Hide	Vincent O'Brien	1:02.00
1982	Kafu	Greville Starkey	Guy Harwood	0:59.33
1983	Superlative	Tony Ives	Bill O'Gorman	1:02.69
1984	Prince Sabo	John Reid	Brian Swift	1:00.60
1985	Green Desert	Lester Piggott	Michael Stoute	1:01.20
1986	Sizzling Melody	Richard Hills	Lord John FitzGerald	0:58.91
1987	Gallic League	Steve Cauthen	Barry Hills	1:00.48
1988	Shuttlecock Corner	Ray Cochrane	Paul Felgate	1:00.59
1989	Abandoned due to subsidence
1990	Distinctly North	Pat Eddery	Jack Berry	1:00.23
1991	Paris House	John Carroll	Jack Berry	1:00.19
1992	Poker Chip	Michael Hills	Ian Balding	1:00.56
1993	Imperial Bailiwick	John Williams	Mark Usher	1:00.44
1994	Raah Algharb	Walter Swinburn	Michael Stoute	1:01.69
1995	Cayman Kai	Pat Eddery	Richard Hannon Sr.	1:01.01
1996	Easycall	Michael Tebbutt	Brian Meehan	1:00.08
1997	Land of Dreams	Darryll Holland	Mark Johnston	1:00.94
1998	Sheer Viking	Michael Hills	Barry Hills	0:59.94
1999	Mrs P	Pat Eddery	Linda Stubbs	1:00.25
2000	Superstar Leo	Michael Hills	William Haggas	0:59.32
2001	Saddad	Richard Hills	Michael Stoute	0:59.94
2002	Wunders Dream	Micky Fenton	James Given	0:59.00
2003	Howick Falls	Frankie Dettori	David Loder	1:01.58
2004	Chateau Istana (Note: The 2004 winner Chateau Istana was later exported to Hong Kong and renamed Chateau King Prawn)	Seb Sanders	Nick Littmoden	1:00.36
2005	Godfrey Street	Ryan Moore	Richard Hannon Sr.	1:02.43
2006 (Note: The 2006 running took place at York)	Wi Dud	Neil Callan	Kevin Ryan	0:58.39
2007	Fleeting Spirit	Frankie Dettori	Jeremy Noseda	0:58.46
2008	Madame Trop Vite	Ted Durcan	Kevin Ryan	1:00.22
2009	Sand Vixen	Frankie Dettori	Saeed bin Suroor	0:58.10
2010	Zebedee	Richard Hughes	Richard Hannon Sr.	0:59.42
2011	Requinto	Wayne Lordan	David Wachman	0:59.23
2012	Sir Prancealot	Johnny Murtagh	Richard Hannon Sr.	0:59.47
2013	Green Door	Jim Crowley	Olly Stevens	0:59.94
2014	Beacon	William Buick	Richard Hannon Jr.	0:58.36
2015	Gutaifan	Frankie Dettori	Richard Hannon Jr.	0:58.04
2016	Ardad	Frankie Dettori	John Gosden	0:59.19
2017	Heartache	Ryan Moore	Clive Cox	0:58.73
2018	Soldier's Call	Daniel Tudhope	Archie Watson	0:59.08
2019	A'ali	Frankie Dettori	Simon Crisford	0:59.35
2020	Ubettabelieveit	Rowan Scott	Nigel Tinkler	1:00.77
2021	Caturra	Adam Kirby	Clive Cox	0:58.58
2022	Trillium	Pat Dobbs	Richard Hannon Jr.	0:59.34
2023	Big Evs	Tom Marquand	Michael Appleby	0:59.89
2024	Aesterius	James Doyle	Archie Watson	0:59.11
2025	Revival Power	Oisin Murphy	Tim Easterby	0:58.96
2026	Final Objective	James Doyle	Hamad Al Jehani	0:58.33

== See also ==
- Horse racing in Great Britain
- List of British flat horse races
- Recurring sporting events established in 1967 – this race is included under its original title, Norfolk Stakes.
