= Tudor Minstrel =

British-bred Thoroughbred racehorse (1944–1971

- Sire: Owen Tudor
- Grandsire: Hyperion
- Dam: Sansonnet
- Damsire: Sansovino
- Sex: Stallion
- Foaled: 1944
- Country: Great Britain
- Colour: Brown
- Breeder: John Arthur Dewar
- Owner: John Arthur Dewar
- Trainer: Fred Darling
- Record: 10: 8-1-0
- Earnings: £24,629

Major wins
- Coventry Stakes (1946); National Breeders' Produce Stakes (1946); 2000 Guineas (1947); St. James's Palace Stakes (1947); Knights Royal Stakes (1947)

Awards
- United Kingdom champion two-year-old colt (1946); Timeform rating: 144
- Last updated on 31 May 2024

Tudor Minstrel (1944–1971) was a British-bred champion Thoroughbred racehorse and sire. In a career which lasted from the spring of 1946 until September 1947, he ran ten times and won eight races. He was unbeaten in four races in 1946, a year in which he was the highest-rated two-year-old in Britain, despite ending his season in July. The following year he won the 2000 Guineas, St. James's Palace Stakes and Knights Royal Stakes over one mile but was beaten in his two attempts at longer distances, most notably when starting odds-on favourite for the 1947 Epsom Derby. The horse is rated one of the greatest of the twentieth century.

== Background ==
Tudor Minstrel was a handsome, powerfully built brown horse bred by his owner John Athur Dewar, who inherited his thoroughbred racehorses from his uncle, the Scottish whisky distiller Thomas Dewar, 1st Baron Dewar. These horses included Lady Juror, who became a successful broodmare, producing Fair Trial, who was the leading sire in Great Britain and Ireland in 1950, and Sansonnet. Sansonnet in turn produced the Coronation Stakes winner Neolight before becoming the dam of Tudor Minstrel, who was sired by Owen Tudor, the 1941 Epsom Derby winner.

== Racing career ==
=== 1946: two-year-old season ===
Tudor Minstrel began his racing career by winning races at Bath and Salisbury in the spring of 1946. He was then sent to Royal Ascot where he won the Coventry Stakes by four lengths. In July he won the National Breeders Produce Stakes at Sandown Park by four lengths and was then retired for the season.

At the end of the year, Tudor Minstrel was given a weight of 133 pounds in the Free Handicap, a rating of the best British two-year-olds, making him the leading juvenile of the season.

=== 1947: three-year-old season ===
Tudor Minstrel began his 1947 by winning a minor race at Bath and then started 11/8 favourite for the 2000 Guineas at Newmarket. Ridden by Gordon Richards, Tudor Minstrel won the one mile Guineas by eight lengths, from Saravan, with Sayajirao in third. The winning margin was the biggest recorded in the race in the twentieth century. Richards eased the colt down in the final furlong, leading contemporary observers to believe that Tudor Minstrel could have won the race by twenty lengths. In the aftermath of his Guineas win, he was described as the "horse of the century".

In the Derby, Tudor Minstrel started at odds of 4/7 at Epsom on a cold, wet day in front of an estimated 400,000 spectators including the King and Queen. Doubts about his stamina were countered by those who pointed out that his pedigree contained many good stayers, with one observer stating that Tudor Minstrel could win the race even if he were hitched to a cart. He failed to settle in the early stages and tired in the straight, finishing fourth behind Pearl Diver. Later in June, Tudor Minstrel returned to one mile for the St. James's Palace Stakes at Royal Ascot and won easily. In July, the colt was again tried over middle distances in the Eclipse Stakes at Sandown but finished second behind Migoli.

In Autumn, Tudor Minstrel appeared for the final time and won the Knight's Royal Stakes at Ascot, a race which was the forerunner of the Queen Elizabeth II Stakes, beating a field which included Petition and the leading sprinter The Bug.

== Assessment ==
British rating company Timeform have Tudor Minstrel ranked equal third among post-war European racehorses, level with Brigadier Gerard and behind only Sea-Bird and Frankel.

== Stud career ==
Retired for breeding purposes, Tudor Minstrel was successful at stud, siring numerous winners including the 1959 Kentucky Derby winner Tomy Lee. Other sons included Sing Sing, Tudor Melody and Will Somers, all three of whom were primarily an influence for speed. Sing Sing sired Song, who in turn sired the brilliant sprinting mare and 1993 European Horse of the Year Lochsong. Tudor Melody was the sire of British champion older horse Welsh Pageant, who had his own success at stud as the damsire of champions Celtic Swing and Ouija Board. The continuation of the Tudor Minstrel male line now depends on the Will Somers line, via the sons of European champion sprinter Cadeaux Genereux.

== Sire line tree ==
- Tudor Minstrel
  - Buckhound
    - Royal Buck
      - Royal Frolic
  - King Of The Tudors
    - Henry The Seventh
      - Luciano
        - Kaiserstern
          - Heyman
    - Crocket
      - Mannsfeld
        - Garrido
    - Golden Ruler
      - Hard Work
        - Mo Exception
  - Poona
  - Will Somers
    - Balidar
      - Bolkonski
      - Young Generation
        - Cadeaux Genereux
    - Pentotal
  - Sallymount
  - Tomy Lee
    - Jeep Driver
  - Tudor Melody
    - Kashmir
      - Blue Cashmere
      - Moulines
      - Lightning
    - Tudor Music
      - Orchestra
        - Vanton
      - To-Agori-Mou
        - Answer Do
    - Welsh Pageant
      - Welsh Chanter
      - Zino
      - Longboat
      - Welnor
    - Tarim
  - Sing Sing
    - Celtic Song
    - Manacle
      - Moorestyle
        - Lockton
    - Jukebox
      - Nickel King
        - Prince Panache
    - Song
    - Mummy's Pet
      - Precocious
        - Elbio
      - Mister Wonderful
    - Singing Bede
    - African Sky
      - African Song
    - Saulingo
    - Averof

== Pedigree ==
Pedigree of Tudor Minstrel, brown stallion, 1944
Sire Owen Tudor 1938	Hyperion; Ch. 1930	Gainsborough	Bayardo
Sire Owen Tudor 1938	Hyperion; Ch. 1930	Gainsborough	Rosedrop
Sire Owen Tudor 1938	Hyperion; Ch. 1930	Selene	Chaucer*
Sire Owen Tudor 1938	Hyperion; Ch. 1930	Selene	Serenissima*
Sire Owen Tudor 1938	Mary Tudor; 1931	Pharos	Phalaris
Sire Owen Tudor 1938	Mary Tudor; 1931	Pharos	Scapa Flow*
Sire Owen Tudor 1938	Mary Tudor; 1931	Anna Bolena	Teddy
Sire Owen Tudor 1938	Mary Tudor; 1931	Anna Bolena	Queen Elizabeth
Dam Sansonnet 1933	Sansovino; 1921	Swynford	John O' Gaunt
Dam Sansonnet 1933	Sansovino; 1921	Swynford	Canterbury Pilgrim*
Dam Sansonnet 1933	Sansovino; 1921	Gondolette*	Loved One
Dam Sansonnet 1933	Sansovino; 1921	Gondolette*	Dongola
Dam Sansonnet 1933	Lady Juror; 1919	Son-In-Law	Dark Ronald
Dam Sansonnet 1933	Lady Juror; 1919	Son-In-Law	Mother In Law
Dam Sansonnet 1933	Lady Juror; 1919	Lady Josephine	Sundridge
Dam Sansonnet 1933	Lady Juror; 1919	Lady Josephine	Americus Girl (Family: 9-c)

* Tudor Minstrel is inbred 5S x 3D to the mare Gondolette, meaning that she appears fifth generation (via Serenissima) on the sire side of his pedigree, and third generation on the dam side of his pedigree.

* Tudor Minstrel is inbred 4S x 5S to the stallion Chaucer, meaning that he appears fourth generation and fifth generation (via Scapa Flow) on the sire side of his pedigree.

* Tudor Minstrel is inbred 5S x 4D to the mare Canterbury Pilgrim, meaning that she appears fifth generation (via Chaucer) on the sire side of his pedigree, and fourth generation on the dam side of his pedigree.
