= Found (horse) =

Irish Thoroughbred racehorse

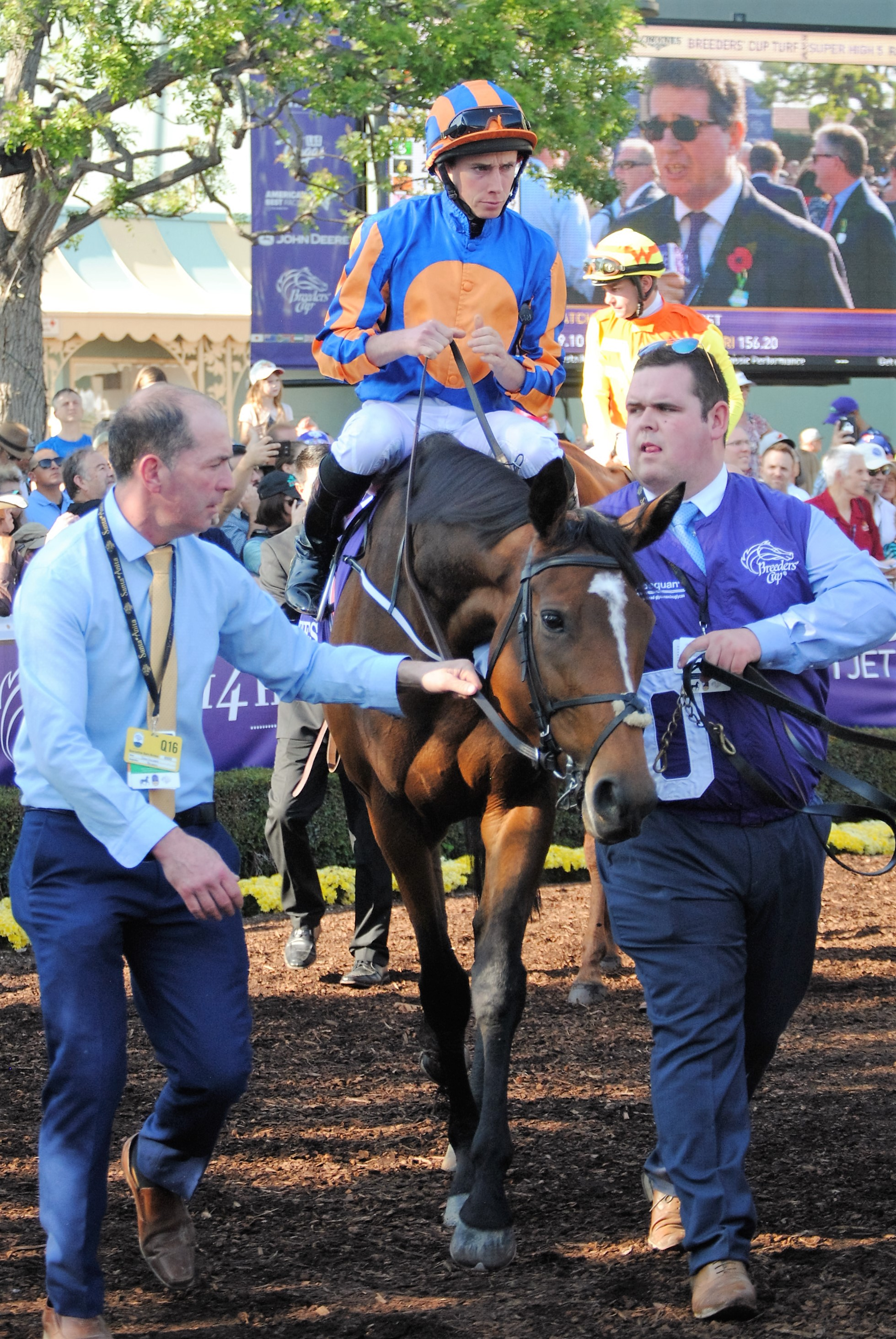
- Found shown prior to the 2016 Breeders' Cup Turf
- Sire: Galileo
- Grandsire: Sadler's Wells
- Dam: Red Evie
- Damsire: Intikhab
- Sex: Filly
- Foaled: 13 March 2012
- Country: Ireland
- Colour: Bay
- Breeder: Roncon, Wynatt & Chelston
- Owner: Michael Tabor, Derrick Smith & Sue Magnier
- Trainer: Aidan O'Brien
- Record: 21: 6-11-3
- Earnings: $7,610,405

Major wins
- Prix Marcel Boussac (2014); Royal Whip Stakes (2015); Breeders' Cup Turf (2015); Mooresbridge Stakes (2016); Prix de l'Arc de Triomphe (2016)

Awards
- Top-rated European two-year-old filly (2014); World's top-rated three-year-old filly (2015); Top-rated European female (2016); Top-rated Irish horse (2016); Cartier Champion Older Horse (2016)
- Last updated on 9 Nov 2016

Found (foaled 13 March 2012) is an Irish Thoroughbred racehorse. Sired by Galileo out of the mare Red Evie, she represents the Coolmore Stud organisation and is trained by Aidan O'Brien. In 2014 she won a strong maiden race on her debut and then finished third in the Moyglare Stud Stakes before winning the Prix Marcel Boussac. She was rated the equal-best two-year-old filly to race in Europe in 2014.

In 2015 she finished second in her first three starts (including the Irish 1,000 Guineas and the Coronation Stakes) before winning the Royal Whip Stakes. She then finished second in the Irish Champion Stakes, ninth in the Prix de l'Arc de Triomphe and second in the Champion Stakes. She ended her season by becoming the first three-year-old filly to win the Breeders' Cup Turf at Keeneland.

At four she won the Mooresbridge Stakes and finished second in the Tattersalls Gold Cup, Coronation Cup, Prince of Wales's Stakes, Yorkshire Oaks and Irish Champion Stakes before winning the Prix de l'Arc de Triomphe. In her last two races she finished second in the Champion Stakes and third in the Breeders' Cup Turf.

== Background ==
Found is a bay filly with a narrow white blaze bred in Ireland by Roncon, Wynatt & Chelston, a group associated with the Coolmore Stud organisation. She was sired by Galileo (1998―2021), who won the Derby, Irish Derby and King George VI and Queen Elizabeth Stakes in 2001. Galileo went on to become one of the world's leading stallions and was champion sire of Great Britain and Ireland five times. His other progeny include Seventh Heaven, Cape Blanco, Frankel, Golden Lilac, Nathaniel, New Approach, Rip Van Winkle and Ruler of the World. Found is the fourth foal produced by Red Evie, a top-class racemare whose wins included the Lockinge Stakes. Red Evie was a descendant of Time and Chance, a mare who produced the Ascot Gold Cup winner Random Shot.

Like most of the Coolmore horses, Found was entered into training with Aidan O'Brien at Ballydoyle. She is owned in partnership by Michael Tabor, Sue Magnier and Derrick Smith.

== Racing career ==
=== 2014: two-year-old season ===
Found made her racecourse debut in a one-mile maiden race at the Curragh Racecourse on 23 August 2014. Ridden by Seamie Heffernan, she started a 14/1 outsider and was regarded as Ballydoyle's second string behind Together Forever, who started 11/10 favourite under her trainer's son Joseph O'Brien. The leading Irish trainers John Oxx, Dermot Weld, Johnny Murtagh and Jim Bolger also had representatives in the fifteen runner field. Found started slowly but moved up through the field to take third place a furlong from the finish. She accelerated in the closing stages to take the lead 100 yards from the finish and won "comfortably" by three quarters of a length from Together Forever. The runner-up went on to win the Group One Fillies' Mile in October.

Joseph O'Brien took over the ride on Found when the filly was moved up in class and dropped in distance for the Group One Moyglare Stud Stakes over seven furlongs at the Curragh on 14 September. In a field of ten fillies she started the 7/2 second favourite behind the British-trained Cursory Glance who had won the Albany Stakes at Royal Ascot before finishing second to Tiggy Wiggy in the Lowther Stakes. She again started slowly but made progress in the straight despite drifting left and right under pressure. She took third place in the final furlong but was unable to reach the lead and finished third, beaten a neck and half a length by Cursory Glance and the Jim Bolger-trained Lucida. O'Brien later described her performance as "a lovely run... she was a little bit green... it happened a little bit quick for her".

Three weeks after her defeat at the Curragh, Found was sent to France for the Group One Prix Marcel Boussac over 1600 metres at Longchamp Racecourse. Ridden by Ryan Moore she was made the 9/4 favourite against eleven opponents. Her main opponents appeared to be the Prix de Cabourg winner Ervedya from France, the Silver Flash Stakes winner Jack Naylor (a filly despite her masculine name) from Ireland and the Prestige Stakes winner Malabar from England, whilst the other runners included Shahah (Prix d'Aumale) and Queen Bee (Prix du Calvados). Found started well but was settled in mid-division as first Ervedya, then Thank You Bye Bye set the pace. Ervedya regained the lead in the straight but Moore produced Found with a strong late run to overtake the French filly 100 metres from the finish before drawing away to win by two and a half lengths. Jack Naylor took third ahead of Malabar and Queen Bee. After the race, O'Brien said of the winner "She is a lovely big filly, with a temperament to match, and I would think she will have no trouble getting a mile and a quarter and maybe a mile and a half, as she is by Galileo. Along with that she has plenty of natural pace, certainly enough to be a Guineas filly... She's a very exciting filly"

Bookmakers responded to her performance by making her the ante-post favourite for both the 1000 Guineas and the Oaks Stakes.

=== 2015: three-year-old season ===
==== Spring ====
Found maintained her position at the head of the market for the 1000 Guineas on 3 May but ten days before the race O'Brien announced that she was not a certain starter in the race after her preparation had been interrupted by illness. She was withdrawn from the race on 1 May. A day after the 1000 was run, Found reappeared against apparently less-challenging opposition in the Group Three Athasi Stakes at the Curragh. Starting odds-on favourite she took the lead approaching the final furlong but was overtaken and beaten two lengths by the four-year-old Iveagh Gardens. On 24 May Found started the 5/4 favourite in an eighteen-runner field for the Irish 1,000 Guineas at the Curragh. After struggling to obtain a clear run in the straight she finished strongly but failed by half a length to overhaul the Jim Bolger-trained Pleascach.

==== Summer ====
Found was entered in The Oaks and a supplementary entry in The Derby was also considered, but she missed the Epsom meeting to reappear in the Coronation Stakes at Royal Ascot She started favourite ahead of a field which included Lucida and the French-trained Ervedya the winner of the Poule d'Essai des Pouliches. She took the lead approaching the final furlong but was caught in the final strides and was beaten a neck by Ervedya. After three consecutive second places, the filly was given a two-month break before being stepped up in distance for the Royal Whip Stakes over ten furlongs at the Curragh on 23 August. Ridden by Heffernan, she took the lead inside the final furlong and drew away to win easily by four lengths from the four-year-old colt Answered.

==== Autumn ====
On 12 September Found was stepped back up to Group One level for the Irish Champion Stakes at Leopardstown. Starting the 6/1 third favourite in a top-class field she finished strongly to finish second, a length behind Golden Horn and ahead of Free Eagle, Pleascach, Highland Reel, The Grey Gatsby and Cirrus des Aigles. In October, a year after her win in the Prix Marcel Boussac the filly was sent to France to contest the Prix de l'Arc de Triomphe over 2400 metres at Longchamp. After racing on the inside she was bumped when Ryan Moore attempted to move her out to obtain a clear run in the straight. She finished ninth of the seventeen runners, five lengths behind the winner Golden Horn. Two weeks after her run in the Arc, Found contested the Champion Stakes over ten furlongs at Ascot and started the 9/2 second favourite behind Golden Horn's stablemate Jack Hobbs. She was restrained by Moore at the rear of the field and was still last of the thirteen runners entering the straight. She then made rapid progress on the inside overtook Jack Hobbs in the final furlong and finished second, one and a quarter lengths behind the winner Fascinating Rock. O'Brien commented "I am delighted with her run, she ran a great race. Ryan let her relax and she came home very well. We can look forward to her for next year, I would hope she will stay in training".

On her final appearance of the season, Found was sent to Kentucky to contest the Breeders' Cup Turf at Keeneland on 31 October. Ridden by Moore she was the only female in the twelve-runner field and started the 6.4/1 fourth choice in the betting. Golden Horn was made the odds-on favourite ahead of the seven-year-old Big Blue Kitten (Joe Hirsch Turf Classic Invitational Stakes, Sword Dancer Invitational Handicap) and the six-year-old The Pizza Man (Arlington Million) whilst the other runners included Red Rifle (Bowling Green Handicap), Twilight Eclipse (Man o' War Stakes) and Slumber (Manhattan Handicap). The outsider Shining Copper, acting as a pacemaker or "rabbit" for his stable companions Big Blue Kitten and Slumber, took the lead soon after the start and opened up a long lead with Found being positioned just behind the leaders of the chasing group. On the final turn Shining Copper gave way to Golden Horn but Found was close behind and moved up to challenge the favourite as Big Blue Kitten began to make rapid progress from the rear. Found gained a narrow advantage 150 yards from the finish and won by half a length from Golden Horn with Big Blue Kitten three quarters of a length away in third. Aidan O'Brien commented "She came out of her races well, and everything was going well with her, so we tried this. She's an amazing filly".

=== 2016: four-year-old season ===
==== Spring ====
On her first appearance as a four-year-old, Found started the 9/10 favourite for the Listed Alleged Stakes at the Curragh on 3 April. After tracking the leaders she began to struggle on the heavy ground and finished third of the five runners behind Zhukova and Success Days. O'Brien said that "she was a bit fresh and keen and just got tired on the ground. She'll be fine though." Over the same course and distance a month later, the filly was matched against Fascinating Rock and three others in the Group Three Mooresbridge Stakes. After being restrained by Moore she struggled to obtain a clear run in the straight before squeezing through a narrow gap in the final furlong and winning by a length and a quarter from Success Days with Fascinating Rock in third. Three weeks later she started 8/15 favourite for the Tattersalls Gold Cup but was beaten into second place by Fascinating Rock.

==== Summer ====
On 4 June Found was sent to England for the Coronation Cup at Epsom and started second favourite behind the five-year-old Postponed in a race which also included Simple Verse and Arabian Queen. After being restrained in the early stages she finished strongly and finished second, four and a half lengths behind Postponed. At Royal Ascot Found was brought back in distance for the Prince of Wales's Stakes and started second favourite behind the Japanese horse A Shin Hikari. She took the lead from the favourite in the straight but was overtaken inside the final furlong and beaten a neck by the 16/1 outsider My Dream Boat. After a break of over two months, Found returned to the track in August and started 2/1 favourite or the Yorkshire Oaks over one and a half miles at York Racecourse. Ridden by Heffernan she made progress from the back of the field in the straight but was unable to get on terms with her younger stablemate Seventh Heaven and was beaten almost three lengths into second place.

==== Autumn ====
On 10 September Found ran for the second time in the Irish Champion Stakes and started 7/1 joint third favourite behind Harzand and Minding in a twelve-runner field which also included Almanzor, New Bay, Highland Reel and Hawkbill. In this race she was ridden for the first time by Frankie Dettori After racing towards the rear of the field she accelerated into the lead in the final furlong but was caught in the closing strides and beaten three quarters of a length by Almanzor. On 2 October Found ran for the second time in the Prix de l'Arc de Tromphe in which she was ridden by Moore and started at odds of 9.6/1. Her fifteen opponents included Postponed, Order of St George, Harzand, Makahiki, Highland Reel, New Bay, The Grey Gatsby and Left Hand (Prix Vermeille). After racing in mid-division she made rapid progress early in the straight, took the lead 400 metres out and ran on well to win by one and three quarter lengths from her stable companion Highland Reel, with Order of St George completing a 1-2-3 for Ballydoyle in third. After the race Moore said "She's been frustrating sometimes but this has probably been the main aim all year. She was back to a mile and a half in an evenly run race and she showed what she's capable of. At her best she's a very hard filly to beat." O'Brien recalled "When Ryan rode her as a two-year-old, he said she could win an Arc and he was right".

Two weeks after her Arc victory Found started 5/2 second favourite in her second attempt to win the Champion Stakes at Ascot. After being held up in the early stages she stayed on strongly in the closing stages to finish second, two lengths behind the favourite Almanzor. On 5 November she was sent to Santa Anita Park in California to attempt to repeat her 2015 victory in the Breeders' Cup Turf and started the 3.6/1 second choice in the betting behind Flintshire. After stumbling at the start she kept on well in the straight to finish third of the twelve runners, four lengths behind her stablemate Highland Reel.

== Assessment and awards ==
In the International Classification for 2014 Found was ranked the equal-best two-year-old filly to race in Europe, level with Tiggy Wiggy and two pounds behind the top colt Belardo. In the 2015 World's Best Racehorse Rankings Found was rated the best three-year-old filly in the world and the forty-second best horse of any age or sex.

On 8 November 2016 Found was named Champion Older Horse at the Cartier Racing Awards. In the 2016 edition of the World's Best Racehorse Rankings Found was given a rating of 124, making her the 8th best racehorse in the world, the top-rated horse in Ireland and the best female racehorse in Europe.

== Broodmare record ==
Found gave birth to her first foal on 10 May 2018, a bay colt by War Front named Battleground. At age two, Battleground won the Chesham Stakes and Veuve Cliquot Vintage Stakes, and finished second in the Breeders' Cup Juvenile Turf.

== Pedigree ==
Pedigree of Found, bay filly, 2012
Sire Galileo (IRE) 1998	Sadler's Wells (USA); 1981	Northern Dancer; 1961	Nearctic
Sire Galileo (IRE) 1998	Sadler's Wells (USA); 1981	Northern Dancer; 1961	Natalma
Sire Galileo (IRE) 1998	Sadler's Wells (USA); 1981	Fairy Bridge; 1975	Bold Reason
Sire Galileo (IRE) 1998	Sadler's Wells (USA); 1981	Fairy Bridge; 1975	Special
Sire Galileo (IRE) 1998	Urban Sea (USA); 1989	Miswaki; 1978	Mr. Prospector
Sire Galileo (IRE) 1998	Urban Sea (USA); 1989	Miswaki; 1978	Hopespringseternal
Sire Galileo (IRE) 1998	Urban Sea (USA); 1989	Allegretta; 1978	Lombard
Sire Galileo (IRE) 1998	Urban Sea (USA); 1989	Allegretta; 1978	Anatevka
Dam Red Evie (IRE) 2003	Intikhab (USA); 1994	Red Ransom; 1987	Roberto
Dam Red Evie (IRE) 2003	Intikhab (USA); 1994	Red Ransom; 1987	Arabia
Dam Red Evie (IRE) 2003	Intikhab (USA); 1994	Crafty Example; 1987	Crafty Prsopector
Dam Red Evie (IRE) 2003	Intikhab (USA); 1994	Crafty Example; 1987	Zienelle
Dam Red Evie (IRE) 2003	Malafemmena (IRE); 1992	Nordico; 1985	Northern Dancer
Dam Red Evie (IRE) 2003	Malafemmena (IRE); 1992	Nordico; 1985	Kennelot
Dam Red Evie (IRE) 2003	Malafemmena (IRE); 1992	Martinova; 1979	Martinmas
Dam Red Evie (IRE) 2003	Malafemmena (IRE); 1992	Martinova; 1979	Pavlova (Family 1-m)

- Found is inbred 3 x 4 to the stallion Northern Dancer, meaning that Northern Dancer appears once in the third generation and once in the fourth generation of her pedigree.
