= Red Evie =

Irish-bred Thoroughbred racehorse

- Sire: Intikhab
- Grandsire: Red Ransom
- Dam: Malafemmena
- Damsire: Nordico
- Sex: Mare
- Foaled: 1 March 2003
- Country: Ireland
- Colour: Bay
- Breeder: Dermot Cantillon & Forenaghts
- Owner: Terry Neill & Georgina Bell
- Trainer: Michael Bell
- Record: 15: 9-1-0
- Earnings: £398,671

Major wins
- Sandringham Handicap (2006); Oak Tree Stakes (2006); Matron Stakes (2006); Lockinge Stakes (2007); Hungerford Stakes (2007)

Red Evie (foaled 4 March 2003) is an Irish-bred, British-trained Thoroughbred racehorse and broodmare. After finishing unplaced in her only start as a two-year-old in 2005 she improved to become a top class miler in the following year, when she won seven consecutive races including the Sandringham Handicap, Oak Tree Stakes and Matron Stakes. She defeated male opposition to win the Lockinge Stakes in 2007 and added a win in the Hungerford Stakes later that year before being retired from racing. As a broodmare for the Coolmore Stud she has made a considerable impact, producing several winners including the outstanding racemare Found.

== Background ==
Red Evie is a bay mare with no white markings bred by Dermot Cantillon & Forenaghts at Tinnakill House in County Laois, Ireland. She was sired by Intikhab, a miler best known for his wide-margin victories in the Diomed Stakes and Queen Anne Stakes in as a four-year-old in 1998. His other offspring have included the outstanding middle-distance filly Snow Fairy. Red Evie's dam Malafemmena showed some ability as a racehorse, winning the Listed Premio Vittorio Crespi in Italy as a two-year-old in 1994. She was a granddaughter of Pavlova a half-sister to the Ascot Gold Cup winner Random Shot. Malafemmena died foaling Red Evie and the filly was raised by a foster mare. Remembering Red Evie's early days Dermot Cantillon described her as "a lovely foal, but independent. Impossible to catch in the field".

As a foal in November 2003, Red Evie was consigned to the Goffs sale in Ireland and was bought for €50,000 by Camas Park Stud. In October 2004 the filly was offered for sale as a yearling at Tattersalls in England and was sold for 58,000 guineas by the bloodstock agents Kern, Lillingston Association. She entered the ownership of Terry Neill and was sent into training with Michael Bell at Newmarket, Suffolk. Bell's wife Georgina also owned a share in the filly and regularly rode her in training gallops.

== Racing career ==
=== 2005: two-year-old season ===
Red Evie made her first appearance in a maiden race over one mile (eight furlongs) at Newmarket Racecourse on 20 September in which she was ridden by Jamie Mackay and started a 100/1 outsider. She looked outpaced by her rivals and finished ninth of the seventeen runners, thirteen lengths behind the John Dunlop-trained Bunood. Commenting a year later, Michael Bell said "She had showed us enough to warrant retaining her. She was a big, scopey sort and we turned her out for three months to let her grow a bit".

=== 2006: three-year-old season ===
From the start of her second season, Jamie Spencer took over as Red Evie's regular jockey. On the filly's first run of 2006 she started at odds of 8/1 for a maiden over seven furlongs at Yarmouth Racecourse on 29 March and recorded her first success, taking the lead approaching the final furlong and winning by one and three quarter lengths despite being eased down by Spencer in the final strides. At the same track in April she was ridden by Kieren Fallon in a one-mile handicap race in which she was assigned a weight of 122 pounds. Starting the 2/1 favourite she overcame trouble in running in the early stages to take the lead a quarter of a mile from the finish and won by two lengths from the Clive Brittain-trained Kaveri. Spencer was back in the saddle on 20 May when Red Evie started favourite for a seven furlong handicap at Newbury Racecourse and won "easily" from fifteen opponents. She returned to the track ten days later for a minor race over seven furlongs at Leicester Racecourse in which she started odds-on favourite and won "comfortably" by a length and a half from the Henry Cecil-trained Star Cluster, having taken the lead two furlongs out.

Red Evie contested her most important race up to that time at Royal Ascot when she contested the Listed Sandringham Handicap, a race in which she was assigned a weight of 124 pounds. She was one of three co-favourites on 5/1 alongside La Mottie and Makderah in a field of nineteen fillies. After being restrained in the early stages she was switched right by Spencer to obtain a clear run in the last quarter mile and produced a strong late run to catch La Mottie in the final stride and win by a head. On 4 August at Goodwood Racecourse, Red Evie attempted to take her winning run to six when she was moved up to Group Three level for the Oak Tree Stakes. She was ridden for the first and only time by Frankie Dettori and was made the 15/8 favourite, with the best-fancied of her eight opponents being Makderah and Spinning Queen. She raced towards the rear of the field before making rapid progress in the last quarter mile, overtaking Makderah inside the final furlong and winning "readily" by half a length.

In September Red Evie was sent to Ireland and was moved up to Group One level for the Matron Stakes at Leopardstown Racecourse. Nannina started favourite ahead of Peeress and Flashy Wings (Lowther Stakes) with Red Evie the 6/1 fourth choice in an eight-runner field. After racing in sixth place she was switched to the outside to make her challenge in the straight. She took the lead a furlong out and held off the strong late challenge of Peeress to win by a short head and record her seventh consecutive victory. Michael Bell said "She has the most amazing racing temperament and will to win, and, unusually, because things generally go wrong rather than right, a copybook season. Her health, preparation, race plans and riding have all gone smoothly. And added to that she's a very determined young lady... [she] has bags of courage. I'd back her in a dogfight."

After racing on good to firm ground for most of the season, Red Evie ended her campaign in the Sun Chariot Stakes on softer ground at Newmarket in October. She began to struggle before half way and was eased down by Spencer to finish tailed-off last of the five runners behind Peeress, Soviet Song, Alexander Goldrun and Musicanna.

=== 2007: four-year-old season ===
On her four-year-old debut, Red Evie took on male opposition for the first time in the Group One Lockinge Stakes at Newbury on 19 May. She started at odds of 8/1 against seven opponents including Peeress, Ramonti, Jeremy (Sandown Mile), Speciosa, Marcus Andronicus (runner-up in the Poule d'Essai des Poulains) and Passager (Prix Perth). After being held up as usual she began to make progress under pressure in the last quarter mile. She went to the front inside the final furlong and "held on gamely" to win in a three-way photo finish from Ramonti and Passager. After the race Michael Bell said "There was a big temptation to retire her last year, but these good fillies don’t come around too often, so we kept her in training. We’ll have a lot of fun with her this season".

Red Evie was well beaten in her next two races. At Royal Ascot in June she finished seventh behind Ramonti in the Queen Anne Stakes after fading in the closing stages. In the following month at Goodwood she returned to all-female competition for the Falmouth Stakes but again faded in the final furlong and finished last of the seven runners behind Simply Perfect. On 18 August Red Evie was dropped in class and distance for the Group Two Hungerford Stakes over seven furlongs at Newbury and started the 5/1 third favourite behind Silver Touch (Criterion Stakes) and Wake Up Maggie (Chartwell Fillies' Stakes, Oak Tree Stakes) whilst the other runners included Welsh Emperor (winner of the race in 2006), Caradak (Prix de la Forêt) and Stronghold (Supreme Stakes). In a contest run in muddy, "filthy" conditions she raced towards the rear of the ten-runner field before producing her customary strong finish, caught the leader Welsh Emperor in the final stride and won by a short head. Spencer explained "She idled and I didn't get sight of Micky Fenton's horse [Welsh Emperor] until late, but I arrived there on the line. She got flattened at Royal Ascot, has never run well at Newmarket and on the gallops she can't beat a donkey".

In the autumn of 2007 Michael Bell commented on the filly's approach to training and racing saying "She hides her capabilities at home, but produces it on the track. There's nothing to be won on the gallops and, as a trainer, you'd always prefer it that way round". In September Red Evie was sent to Ireland and attempted to repeat her 2006 success in the Matron Stakes. She finished strongly but was beaten one and a half lengths into second place by the Michael Stoute-trained Echelon. On her final appearance the filly was sent to France for the Prix de la Forêt over 1400 metres at Longchamp Racecourse in October. Racing on soft ground she never looked likely to win and finished tenth of the thirteen runners behind the German-trained outsider Toylsome.

== Breeding record ==
At the end of her racing career Red Evie was offered for sale in December 2007 at Tattersalls but failed to reach her reserve price of 1,000,000 guineas. She was later bought privately and became a broodmare for the Coolmore Stud. Her foals have included:

- Red Corvette, a bay filly, foaled in 2009, sired by Galileo. Unraced
- Magical Dream, bay filly, 2010, by Galileo. Won two races including C L Weld Park Stakes.
- Iniesta, bay colt (later gelded), 2011, by Galileo. Won one flat race and three National Hunt races.
- Found, bay filly, 2012, by Galileo. Won six races including Prix Marcel Boussac, Breeders' Cup Turf, Prix de l'Arc de Triomphe.
- Best In The World, bay filly, 2013, by Galileo. Won two races including the Give Thanks Stakes. Dam of Snowfall.
- James Cook, bay colt, 2015, by Galileo. Won one race.
- The Tooth Fairy, bay filly, 2016, by Galileo. Won one race.
- Divinely, bay filly, 2018, by Galileo. Won one race, namely the Flame of Tara Stakes.

== Pedigree ==
Pedigree of Red Evie (IRE), bay filly, 2003
Sire Intikhab (USA) 1994	Red Ransom (USA); 1987	Roberto	Hail To Reason
Sire Intikhab (USA) 1994	Red Ransom (USA); 1987	Roberto	Bramalea
Sire Intikhab (USA) 1994	Red Ransom (USA); 1987	Arabia	Damascus
Sire Intikhab (USA) 1994	Red Ransom (USA); 1987	Arabia	Christmas Wind
Sire Intikhab (USA) 1994	Crafty Example (USA); 1987	Crafty Prospector	Mr. Prospector
Sire Intikhab (USA) 1994	Crafty Example (USA); 1987	Crafty Prospector	Real Crafty Lady
Sire Intikhab (USA) 1994	Crafty Example (USA); 1987	Zienelle	Danzig
Sire Intikhab (USA) 1994	Crafty Example (USA); 1987	Zienelle	Past Example
Dam Malafemmena (IRE) 1992	Nordico (USA); 1981	Northern Dancer	Nearctic
Dam Malafemmena (IRE) 1992	Nordico (USA); 1981	Northern Dancer	Natalma
Dam Malafemmena (IRE) 1992	Nordico (USA); 1981	Kennelot	Gallant Man
Dam Malafemmena (IRE) 1992	Nordico (USA); 1981	Kennelot	Queen Sucree
Dam Malafemmena (IRE) 1992	Martinova (IRE); 1978	Martinmas	Silly Season
Dam Malafemmena (IRE) 1992	Martinova (IRE); 1978	Martinmas	Calvine
Dam Malafemmena (IRE) 1992	Martinova (IRE); 1978	Pavlova	Fidalgo
Dam Malafemmena (IRE) 1992	Martinova (IRE); 1978	Pavlova	Time And Chance (Family 1-m)
