= Wassl =

British-bred Thoroughbred racehorse

- Sire: Mill Reef
- Grandsire: Never Bend
- Dam: Hayloft
- Damsire: Tudor Melody
- Sex: Stallion
- Foaled: 27 April 1980
- Country: United Kingdom
- Colour: Bay
- Breeder: Limestone Stud
- Owner: Ahmed bin Rashid Al Maktoum
- Trainer: John Dunlop
- Record: 15: 4-1-3

Major wins
- Greenham Stakes (1983); Irish 2,000 Guineas (1983); Lockinge Stakes (1984)

Awards
- Timeform rating 93p (1982), 125 (1983), 110 (1984)

Wassl (27 April 1980 – after 1998) was a British Thoroughbred racehorse and sire. As a two-year-old he showed great promise when winning on his debut but missed the rest of the season through injury. In the following spring he won the Greenham Stakes and then rebounded from a poor run in the 2000 Guineas to win the Irish 2,000 Guineas. He failed to win again in 1983 but was placed in the Sussex Stakes, Prix du Moulin and Joe McGrath Memorial Stakes. He dead-heated for first place in the Lockinge Stakes on his first run of 1984 but was well beaten in his four other races as a four-year-old. After his retirement from racing he stood as a breeding stallion in Ireland and Japan and had limited success as a sire of winners.

== Background ==
Wassl was a "neat, most attractive, bonny" bay horse standing 16 hands high with a large white star bred by the Lincolnshire-based Limestone Stud. As a yearling he was put up for auction and bought for 300,000 guineas by representatives of Sheikh Mohammed. During his racing career he was trained by John Dunlop at Arundel in West Sussex. Although he ran in Sheikh Mohammed's colours in his first race he was then officially transferred to the ownership of the Sheikh's younger brother Ahmed bin Rashid Al Maktoum. He was named in honour of Ahmed's football team Al-Wasl F.C.

He was from the seventh crop of foals sired by Mill Reef. an American-bred stallion who raced in Europe, winning The Derby, King George VI and Queen Elizabeth Stakes and Prix de l'Arc de Triomphe in 1971. His other progeny included Shirley Heights, Acamas, Diamond Shoal, Fairy Footsteps, Doyoun, Glint of Gold, Ibn Bey, Lashkari, Milligram and Reference Point. Wassl's dam was a top class two-year-old in 1973 when she won the Molecomb Stakes. As a broodmare she also produced Pennyweight, the female-line ancestor of Twilight Son. She was descendant of the mare New Moon, who was a half-sister to Hyperion Pharamond and Sickle.

== Racing career ==
=== 1982: two-year-old season ===
On his racecourse debut, Wassl started second favourite for the Duchess of Kent Stakes over six furlongs at York Racecourse in June. He overcame a poor start to take the lead approaching the final furlong and won easily by three lengths from All Systems Go, despite being eased down by his jockey in the final strides. The form of the race was boosted in September when All Systems Go won the Group Two Champagne Stakes at Doncaster. Wassl however did not run again that season as he was injured in his stall ("cast in his box") two weeks after his win at York.

=== 1983: three-year-old season ===
Wassl began his second campaign in the Greenham Stakes (a trial race for the 2000 Guineas) over seven furlongs at Newbury Racecourse in April. Racing for the first time in almost ten months he was ridden by Willie Carson and started at odds of 11/2 after reports that he had been unimpressive in training gallops. After stumbling and swerving at the start he recovered totake the lead in the closing stages and won comfortably by three quarters of a length. In the 2000 Guineas over the Rowley Mile at Newmarket Racecourse at the end of the month the colt started the 9/2 third choice in the betting behind Diesis and Gorytus but ran poorly and finished ninth of the sixteen runners behind Lomond.

Two weeks after his defeat at Newmarket, Wassl was one of ten colts to contest the Irish 2000 Guineas over one mile on heavy ground at the Curragh on 14 May. Lomond was made the odds-on favourite ahead of the French-trained Crystal Glitters (runner-up to L'Emigrant in the Poule d'Essai des Poulains) with Wassl next is the betting on 12/1 alongside the Dermot Weld-trained Parliament. Ridden for the first time by Tony Murray he was close to the pace in the early stages, moved up to dispute the lead at half way and stayed on very well in the closing stages to win by three quarters of a length from Lomond. Called upon to explain the winner's improved performance John Dunlop said that the colt had "lost interest" at Newmarket where he had been drawn on the outside and had little company in the early stages. Murray confirmed that Wassl needed "something to race with".

Wassl was then stepped up in distance for the 204th running of the Epsom Derby over one and a half miles, in June. With Murray again in the saddle he started the 10/1 fifth choice in a 21-runner field but tired from half way and finished fourteenth behind Teenoso. He was tried over the distance again in the Irish Derby on much firmer ground at the Curragh on 25 June and finished fifth behind Shareef Dancer, Caerleon, Teenoso and Quilted. Wassl was brought back in distance to around one mile for his next two races and ran creditably in defeat, running third to Noalcoholic and Tolomeo in the Sussex Stakes at Goodwood on 27 July and third again, behind Luth Enchantee and L'Emigarnt in the Prix du Moulin at Longchamp on 4 September. Less than two weeks after his run in France he was sent to Ireland and stepped back up in distance for the Joe McGrath Memorial Stakes over ten furlongs at Leopardstown Racecourse and ran second to the five-year-old mare Stanerra. On his final appearance of the season, in the Champion Stakes at Newmarket on 15 October he ran poorly and came home eighteenth of the nineteen runners behind Cormorant Wood.

=== 1984: four-year-old season ===
For his first appearance at four Wassl was ridden by Carson when he contested the Lockinge Stakes over a mile at Newbury. He looked impressive before the race and started at odds of 9/2 against four opponents including Cormorant Wood and the three-year-old Trojan Fen who started favourite. His task was made considerable less challenging when Trojan Fen stumbled when exiting the starting stalls and unseated his jockey. After leading from the start Wassl was overtaken by Cormorant Wood in the final furlong but rallied strongly and the pair crossed the line together. After examining the photo finish the racecourse judge declared a dead heat, making Wassl and Cormorant Wood joint winners.

Wassl was well beaten in his four subsequent races, starting with the Queen Anne Stakes at Royal Ascot in which he finished fourth behind Trojan Fen. He was unplaced behind Solford in the Eclipse Stakes and then finished a remote fourth of five in the Sussex Stakes, although he was promoted to third on the disqualification of the runner-up Rousillon. He ended his track career by running unplaced behind Rousillon in the Waterford Crystal Mile at Goodwood in August.

== Assessment ==
In the Free Handicap for 1982 (a ranking of the best two-year-olds to race in Britain) Wassl was assigned a weight of 119 pounds, 14 pounds behind the top-rated Diesis. The independent Timeform organisation gave the colt a rating of 93 p, with the "p" indicating that he was expected to make more than usual improvement. In their annual Racehorses of 1982 they described him as "a very interesting prospect indeed". The following year saw Wassl awarded a 125 rating by Timeform, ten pounds inferior to their best three-year-old colt Shareef Dancer. The official International Classification concurred, rating him 10 pounds behind the top-rated Shareef Dancer making him the 14th best three-year-old colt in Europe.

== Stud record ==
Wassl was retired from racing at the end of 1984 and began his career as a breeding stallion in 1985 at the Derrinstown Stud in County Kildare at a stud fee of 15,000 guineas. He was exported to Japan in 1989 and covered his last mares in 1998. The best of his European offspring included Wiorno Prix Dollar and Ocean Falls (Prix Quincey). In Japan he sired Meisho Amur, the winner of the Grade II Breeders' Gold Cup.

== Pedigree ==
Pedigree of Wassl (GB), bay stallion, 1980
Sire Mill Reef (USA) 1968	Never Bend (USA); 1960	Nasrullah	Nearco
Sire Mill Reef (USA) 1968	Never Bend (USA); 1960	Nasrullah	Mumtaz Begum
Sire Mill Reef (USA) 1968	Never Bend (USA); 1960	Lalun	Djeddah
Sire Mill Reef (USA) 1968	Never Bend (USA); 1960	Lalun	Be Faithful
Sire Mill Reef (USA) 1968	Milan Mill (USA); 1962	Princequillo	Prince Rose
Sire Mill Reef (USA) 1968	Milan Mill (USA); 1962	Princequillo	Cosquilla
Sire Mill Reef (USA) 1968	Milan Mill (USA); 1962	Virginia Water	Count Fleet
Sire Mill Reef (USA) 1968	Milan Mill (USA); 1962	Virginia Water	Red Ray
Dam Hayloft (FR) 1969	Tudor Melody (GB); 1956	Tudor Minstrel	Owen Tudor
Dam Hayloft (FR) 1969	Tudor Melody (GB); 1956	Tudor Minstrel	Sansonnet
Dam Hayloft (FR) 1969	Tudor Melody (GB); 1956	Matelda	Dante
Dam Hayloft (FR) 1969	Tudor Melody (GB); 1956	Matelda	Fairly Hot
Dam Hayloft (FR) 1969	Haymaking (GB); 1963	Galivanter	Golden Cloud
Dam Hayloft (FR) 1969	Haymaking (GB); 1963	Galivanter	Lycia
Dam Hayloft (FR) 1969	Haymaking (GB); 1963	Haytime	Alycidon
Dam Hayloft (FR) 1969	Haymaking (GB); 1963	Haytime	Hazy Moon (Family: 6-e)
