= Among Men =

American-bred Thoroughbred racehorse

- Sire: Zilzal
- Grandsire: Nureyev
- Dam: Questionblevirtue
- Damsire: Key to the Mint
- Sex: Stallion
- Foaled: 7 March 1994
- Country: United States
- Colour: Bay
- Breeder: Gail Beitz & Gainsborough Farm
- Owner: Susan Magnier & Michael Tabor
- Trainer: Michael Stoute
- Record: 12: 6-2-0
- Earnings: £271,907

Major wins
- Heron Stakes (1997); Jersey Stakes (1997); Celebration Mile (1997); Sussex Stakes (1998)

Among Men (7 March 1994 – 2002) was an American-bred British-trained Thoroughbred racehorse and sire. He was bred in Kentucky before being acquired by the Coolmore Stud and sent to race in Europe. He was unraced as a two-year-old, before winning on his racecourse debut in 1997. In the same year he recorded increasingly important victories in the Heron Stakes, Jersey Stakes and Celebration Mile, although the last of these was on the disqualification of Cape Cross. His biggest win came as a four-year-old in 1998 when he won the Sussex Stakes. He was retired to stud at the end of the year but had little success as a breeding stallion and died in 2002 at the age of eight.

== Background ==
Among Men was a big, powerful bay horse with no white markings bred in Kentucky by Gail Beitz & Gainsborough Farm. He was from the fourth crop of foals sired by Zilzal, an outstanding miler who won the Sussex Stakes and Queen Elizabeth II Stakes in 1989. The best of Zilzal's other progeny included Faithful Son (Prince of Wales's Stakes, Always Loyal (Poule d'Essai des Poulains and Shaanxi (Prix d'Astarte. Among Men's dam Questionablevirtue was an unraced daughter of Key to the Mint.

Among Men was sent to the Keeneland sale in September where he was acquired for $55,000 by the bloodstock agent Dermot "Demi" O'Byrne on behalf of John Magnier's Coolmore Stud organisation. He was sent to Europe where he was trained by Michael Stoute at Newmarket, Suffolk. During his racing career he was owned in partnership by Michael Tabor and Susan Magnier. He was ridden in all but three of his races by Mick Kinane. Like his sire, he tended to sweat heavily before his races but was described as one of the best-looking colts of his generation.

== Racing career ==
=== 1997: three-year-old season ===
On his racecourse debut, Among Men contested a sixteen-runner maiden race over the Rowley Mile course at Newmarket Racecourse on 4 May. After pulling hard in the early stages he took the lead inside the final furlong and won by two and a half lengths from the Geoff Wragg-trained favourite The Prince. Three weeks later the colt was moved up in class and started 10/11 favourite for the Listed Heron Stakes at Kempton Park Racecourse. Ridden by Ray Cochrane he struggled to obtain a clear run in the last quarter mile but finished strongly to take the lead in the final strides and won by a short head from Amid Albadu.

On 18 June Among Men started the 4/1 favourite for the Group Three Jersey Stakes over seven furlongs at Royal Ascot. His principal opponents, according to the betting were the Godolphin colt Kahal, the improving handicapper Tayseer, the Henry Cecil-trained Shaheen and the fillies Meshhed and Nightbird. He was among the leaders from the start, and took the lead inside the final furlong to win by half a length from Kahal, with the 66/1 outsider Hornbeam two and a half lengths back in third.

On his next race, the colt was moved up to Group One class and matched against older horses for the first time in the Sussex Stakes over one mile at Goodwood Racecourse on 30 July. He was restrained by Kinane in the early stages before making progress in the straight and finished fourth behind Ali-Royal, Starborough and Allied Forces. The unplaced horses included Air Express and Alhaarth. Twenty five days later, Among Men contested the Group Two Celebration Mile over the same course and distance. He started 8/11 favourite with his three opponents being Cape Cross, Polar Prince (Diomed Stakes) and Peartree House. After leading the field into the straight, Among Men was overtaken in the straight and beaten two and a half lengths by Cape Cross. Following a stewards enquiry however, the "winner" was disqualified for causing interference and placed last with the race being awarded to Among Men.

=== 1998: four-year-old season ===
Among Men made his first appearance as a four-year-old in the Lockinge Stakes at Newbury Racecourse on 16 May. He was among the leaders in the early stages but weakened in the last furlong and finished sixth of the ten runners behind Cape Cross. At Royal Ascot in June the colt contested the Queen Anne Stakes (then a Group Two race) over one mile. He took the lead approaching the final furlong and finished ahead of Almushtarak and Cape Cross but proved no match for the favourite Intikhab who beat him into second place by eight lengths. Among Men was dropped in class for a minor event over seven furlongs at Yarmouth on 2 July and won from three opponents at odds of 2/7.

In July, Among Men made a second attempt to win the Sussex Stakes and after heavy support in the betting market started 4/1 second favourite behind the three-year-old Lend A Hand, the winner of the Gran Criterium and runner-up in the 2000 Guineas. The other runners included Starborough, Tarascon and Victory Note (Poule d'Essai des Poulains). Kinane positioned the colt in third place behind Starborough and Lend A Hand before moving forward in the straight. He took the lead from Lend A Hand approaching the final furlong and held off the late challenge of Almushtarak to win by a length. Explaining the colt's improvement Stoute said "He had an interruption before Newbury and, with a big horse like him, it's harder to overcome a setback".

In the Prix Jacques le Marois at Deauville Racecourse in August Among Men proved the best of the European runners but was beaten half a length into second place by the Japanese challenger Taiki Shuttle. On 26 September Among Men, ridden by John Reid, started second favourite for the Queen Elizabeth II Stakes at Ascot but after challenging for the lead in the straight he faded to finish fifth of the seven runners behind Desert Prince. On his final appearance, the colt was sent to Churchill Downs for the Breeders' Cup Mile on 7 November in which he was partnered by Gary Stevens and started a 21/1 outsider. He reached fifth place on the final turn but weakened in the straight and finished eleventh behind the six-year-old gelding Da Hoss.

== Stud record ==
Among Men was retired from racing to become a breeding stallion for the Coolmore Stud Ireland, beginning his stud career at a fee of 5,000 Irish guineas. He sired several minor winners in Europe, but none of group race class. He was later exported to South Africa where he died in 2002.

== Pedigree ==
Pedigree of Among Men (USA), bay stallion, 1994
Sire Zilzal (USA) 1986	Nureyev (USA); 1977	Northern Dancer	Nearctic
Sire Zilzal (USA) 1986	Nureyev (USA); 1977	Northern Dancer	Natalma
Sire Zilzal (USA) 1986	Nureyev (USA); 1977	Special	Forli
Sire Zilzal (USA) 1986	Nureyev (USA); 1977	Special	Thong
Sire Zilzal (USA) 1986	French Charmer (USA); 1978	Le Fabuleux	Wild Risk
Sire Zilzal (USA) 1986	French Charmer (USA); 1978	Le Fabuleux	Anguar
Sire Zilzal (USA) 1986	French Charmer (USA); 1978	Bold Example	Bold Lad
Sire Zilzal (USA) 1986	French Charmer (USA); 1978	Bold Example	Lady Be Good
Dam Questionablevirtue (USA) 1987	Key to the Mint (USA); 1969	Graustark	Ribot
Dam Questionablevirtue (USA) 1987	Key to the Mint (USA); 1969	Graustark	Flower Bowl
Dam Questionablevirtue (USA) 1987	Key to the Mint (USA); 1969	Key Bridge	Princequillo
Dam Questionablevirtue (USA) 1987	Key to the Mint (USA); 1969	Key Bridge	Blue Banner
Dam Questionablevirtue (USA) 1987	Propositioning (USA); 1980	Mr Prospector	Raise A Native
Dam Questionablevirtue (USA) 1987	Propositioning (USA); 1980	Mr Prospector	Gold Digger
Dam Questionablevirtue (USA) 1987	Propositioning (USA); 1980	Stay Over	Prove It
Dam Questionablevirtue (USA) 1987	Propositioning (USA); 1980	Stay Over	Don't Linger (Family: 4-r)
