= 1983 Epsom Derby =

- Derby
- Location: Epsom Downs Racecourse
- Date: 1 June 1983
- Winning horse: Teenoso
- Starting price: 9/2 Fav
- Jockey: Lester Piggott
- Trainer: Geoff Wragg
- Owner: Eric Moller
- Conditions: Soft

Epsom Derby 1983
1-2-3
Teenoso	Carlingford Castle	Shearwalk

Also Ran
4-5-6
Salmon Leap	Guns of Navarone	Naar
7-8-9
Pluralisme	Morcon	Tolomeo
10-11-12
Gordian	The Noble Player	Mitilini
13-14-15
Neorion	Wassl	Tivian
16-17-18
Lomond	Slewpy	Appeal To Me
19-20-21
Holmbury	Zoffany	Yawa

The 1983 Epsom Derby was the 204th annual running of the Derby horse race. It took place at Epsom Downs Racecourse on 1 June 1983.

The race was won by Eric Moller's Teenoso, at odds of 9/2 ridden by jockey Lester Piggott and trained at Newmarket by Geoff Wragg. Teenoso's win gave Piggott a record-breaking ninth success in the race. The winning time of 2:49.07 was the slowest of the 20th century.

== Race details ==
- Sponsor: none
- Winner's prize money: £165,080
- Going: Soft
- Number of runners: 21
- Winner's time: 2 minutes, 49.07 seconds

== Full result ==
	Dist *	Horse	Jockey	Trainer	SP
1		Teenoso	Lester Piggott	Geoff Wragg	9-2
2	3	Carlingford Castle	Mick Kinane	Liam Browne (IRE)	14-1
3	3	Shearwalk	Walter Swinburn	Michael Stoute	18-1
4	shd	Salmon Leap	Pat Eddery	Vincent O'Brien (IRE)	11-2
5	2½	Guns of Navarone	Philip Robinson	Clive Brittain	20-1
6	8	Naar	Joe Mercer	Peter Walwyn	100-1
7	½	Pluralisme	Freddy Head	Alec Head (FR)	18-1
8	4	Morcon	Willie Carson	Dick Hern	17-2
9	hd	Tolomeo	Gianfranco Dettori	Luca Cumani	14-1
10	1	Gordian	Cash Asmussen	Guy Harwood	25-1
11	nk	The Noble Player	Steve Cauthen	Barry Hills	16-1
12		Mitilini	Geoff Baxter	Ron Boss	500-1
13		Neorion	Brian Rouse	Clive Brittain	150-1
14		Wassl	Tony Murray	John Dunlop	10-1
15		Tivian	Sandy Barclay	Clive Brittain	500-1
16		Lomond	Willie Shoemaker	Vincent O'Brien (IRE)	9-1
17		Appeal To Me	John Reid	Paul Kelleway	500-1
18		Slewpy	Yves Saint-Martin	S Watters, jnr. (USA)	100-1
19		Holmbury	M Miller	Geoff Huffer	1000-1
20		Zoffany	Greville Starkey	Guy Harwood	28-1
U		Yawa	Philip Waldron	Geoff Lewis	50-1

== Winner details ==
Further details of the winner, Teenoso:

- Foaled: 7 April 1980, in United Kingdom
- Sire: Youth; Dam: Furioso (Ballymoss)
- Owner: Eric Moller
- Breeder: White Lodge Stud

== Form analysis ==
=== Two-year-old races ===
Notable runs by the future Derby participants as two-year-olds in 1982:

- Gordian – 3rd in Somerville Tattersall Stakes, 2nd in Dewhurst Stakes
- Lomond – 3rd in National Stakes
- Pluralisme – 1st in Prix des Chênes
- Shearwalk – 3rd in Seaton Delaval Stakes
- Slewpy – 1st in Young America Stakes
- The Noble Player – 2nd in Washington Singer Stakes, 3rd in Royal Lodge Stakes, 3rd in Grand Critérium

=== The road to Epsom ===
Early-season appearances in 1983 and trial races prior to running in the Derby:

- Carlingford Castle – 1st in Gallinule Stakes
- Gordian – 1st in Sandown Classic Trial
- Gun of Navarone – 3rd in Craven Stakes, 2nd in Dante Stakes
- Lomond – 1st in Gladness Stakes, 1st in 2000 Guineas, 2nd in Irish 2000 Guineas
- Morcon – 1st in Predominate Stakes
- Neorion – 2nd in Sandown Classic Trial
- Pluralisme – 1st in Prix de Guiche
- Salmon Leap – 1st in Tetrarch Stakes, 1st in Nijinsky Stakes
- Shearwalk – 1st in Heathorn Stakes, 2nd in Lingfield Derby Trial
- Slewpy – 3rd in Louisiana Derby
- Teenoso – 1st in Lingfield Derby Trial
- Tolomeo – 2nd in 2000 Guineas
- Wassl – 1st in Greenham Stakes, 1st in Irish 2000 Guineas
- Yawa – 3rd in Lingfield Derby Trial
- Zoffany – 1st in Feilden Stakes

=== Subsequent Group 1 wins ===
Group 1 / Grade I victories after running in the Derby.

- Slewpy – Meadowlands Cup (1983)
- Teenoso – Grand Prix de Saint-Cloud (1984), King George VI and Queen Elizabeth Stakes (1984)
- Tolomeo – Arlington Million (1983)
- Yawa – Grand Prix de Paris (1983), Premio Roma (1984)
- Zoffany – Hollywood Turf Cup (1985), Sunset Handicap (1986), San Luis Rey Handicap (1987)

== Subsequent breeding careers ==
Leading progeny of participants in the 1983 Epsom Derby.

=== Sires of Classic winners ===
Lomond (16th)

- Marling – 1st Irish 1000 Guineas (1992)
- Dark Lomond – 1st Irish St. Leger (1988)
- Valanour – 1st Grand Prix de Paris (1995)
- Patrona – dam of Exceed And Excel

Tolomeo (9th) – Exported to Australia – Exported to Japan

- Innocent King – 1st Australian Derby (1993)
- Rain Burst – 3rd Fillies' Mile (1988)
- Daiwa Texas – 3rd Arima Kinen (2000)

=== Sires of Group/Grade One winners ===
Slewpy (18th)

- Thirty Slews – 1st Breeders' Cup Sprint (1992)
- Mr Nickerson – 3rd Vosburgh Stakes (1989)
- Helice – dam of Helissio
- Gift Of The Night – dam of Falbrav

Salmon Leap (4th)

- Bradawn Breever – 1st Phoenix Stakes (1991)
- Premier Amour – 3rd Prix de Diane (1989)
- Upward Trend – 1st Matron Stakes (1989)
- Farinella – Dam of Beef Or Salmon

Morcon (8th) – Exported to New Zealand

- Solvit – 1st W. S. Cox Plate (1994)

Guns of Navarone (5th) – Exported to New Zealand

- Henderson Bay – 1st Sydney Cup (2002)

=== Sires of National Hunt horses ===
Teenoso (1st)

- Horus – 1st Edward Hanmer Memorial Chase (2004)
- Young Spartacus – 1st Mildmay of Flete Challenge Cup (2003)
- Her Honour – 2nd Long Distance Hurdle (1995)
- Young Buster – 1st September Stakes (1991)

Carlingford Castle (2nd)

- Inis Cara – 1st Paddy Power Handicap Chase (1999)
- Visible Difference – 1st Drinmore Chase (1993)
- Castle Mane – 1st Foxhunter Chase Challenge Cup (1999)
- Gretchen's Castle – Dam of Pandorama

=== Other Stallions ===
Wassl (14th) – Wiorno (1st Prix Dollar 1991), Ocean Falls (3rd Poule d'Essai des Poulains 1989), Anna Petrovna (dam of Annus Mirabilis)
Zoffany (20th) – Clan Osullivan (2nd Golden Slipper Stakes 1992), Miss Zoe (3rd Australian Oaks 2000)
The Noble Player (11th) – Tinte Blu (1st Premio Royal Mares 1991), Este (dam of Estejo)
Pluralisme (7th) – Exported to Japan – Yamano Casablanca (2nd Oka Sho 1991)
Shearwalk (3rd) – Exported to New Zealand – Exported to Australia
Gordian (10th) – Exported to Brazil
Yawa (Unseated) – Exported to Japan
