= Jersey Stakes =

- Class: Group 3
- Location: Ascot Racecourse; Ascot, England
- Inaugurated: 1919
- Race type: Flat / Thoroughbred
- Website: Ascot

Race information
- Distance: 7f (1,408 metres)
- Surface: Turf
- Track: Straight
- Qualification: Three-year-olds
- Weight: 9 st 1 lb Allowances; 3 lb for fillies Penalties; 5 lb for G1 / G2 winners 3 lb for G3 winners
- Purse: £110,000 (2022); 1st: £65,120

Jersey Stakes
2026
Thesecretadversary	Take Charge Star	Morris Dancer

Previous years
2025
Noble Champion	Spy Chief	Comanche Brave
2024
Haatem	Kikkuli	Chicago Critic
2023
Age Of Kings	Zoology	Streets Of Gold
2022
Noble Truth	Find	Dubai Poet
2021
Creative Force	Naval Crown	Vadream

2020-2011
2020
Molatham	Monarch Of Egypt	Symbolize
2019
Space Traveller	Space Blues	Angel's Hideaway
2018
Expert Eye	Society Power	Could It Be Love
2017
Le Brivido	Spirit of Valor	Mubtasim
2016
Ribchester	Thikriyaat	Forge
2015
Dutch Connection	Fadhayyil	Bossy Guest
2014
Mustajeeb	Muwaary	Giovanni Boldini
2013
Gale Force Ten	Montiridge	Tawhid
2012
Ishvana	Sentaril	Aljamaaheer
2011
Strong Suit	Codemaster	Western Aristocrat

2010-2001
2010
Rainfall	Red Jazz	Rock Jock
2009
Ouqba	Deposer	Ashram
2008
Aqlaam	Il Warrd	Dream Eater
2007
Tariq	US Ranger	Arabian Gleam
2006
Jeremy	Asset	Kingsgate Prince
2005
Proclamation	Camacho	Home Affairs
2004
Kheleyf	Fokine	Cartography
2003
Membership	Arakan	Rimrod
2002
Just James	Steenberg	Meshaheer
2001
Mozart	Aldebaran	Ratio

2000-1991
2000
Observatory	Umistim	Hunting Lion
1999
Lots Of Magic	Enrique	Bertolini
1998
Diktat	Bold Edge	Lovers Knot
1997
Among Men	Kahal	Hornbeam
1996
Lucayan Prince	Ramooz	Bewitching
1995
Sergeyev	Shahid	First Island
1994
River Deep	Gneiss	Dumaani
1993
Ardkinglass	Matelot	Abbey's Gal
1992
Prince Ferdinand	Pursuit Of Love	Fair Cop
1991
Satin Flower	Dawson Place	Desert Sun

1990-1988
1990
Sally Rous	Bold Russian	Qui Danzig
1989
Zilzal	Russian Royal	Distant Relative
1988
Indian Ridge	Salse	Hibernian Gold

The Jersey Stakes is a Group 3 flat horse race in Great Britain open to three-year-old horses. It is run at Ascot over a distance of 7 furlongs (1,408 metres), and it is scheduled to take place each year in June.

The event was established when a three-year cycle of races called the Triennial Stakes was discontinued after World War I. The Triennial Stakes had comprised a race for two-year-olds over 5 furlongs, a race for three-year-olds over 7 furlongs, and a race for four-year-olds over 2 miles. Horses would return each year to compete over the increasing distances.

The Jersey Stakes replaced the second leg of the Triennial Stakes in 1919. It was named after the 4th Earl of Jersey, who served as the Master of the Buckhounds in the late eighteenth century.

The race is now run on the final day of the five-day Royal Ascot meeting.

== Records ==
Leading jockey (6 wins):

- Sir Gordon Richards – Rattlin the Reefer (1929), Medieval Knight (1934), Theft (1935), Cave Man (1938), Nebuchadnezzar (1947), Rhinehart (1953)
- Lester Piggott – Favorita (1961), The Creditor (1963), Young Christopher (1964), Gay Fandango (1975), Hard Fought (1980), Rasa Penang (1981)

Leading trainer (6 wins):

- Sir Michael Stoute – Etienne Gerard (1977), Hard Fought (1980), Zilzal (1989), Among Men (1997), Jeremy (2006), Expert Eye (2018)

== Winners since 1919 ==
Year	Winner	Jockey	Trainer	Time
1919	Knight of the Air	Fred Templeman	George Manser
1920	Tete a Tete	Izaak Strydom	Robert Sherwood Jr.
1921	Gask	Vic Smyth	Fred Darling	1:39.80
1922	Dragoon	Joe Childs	Alec Taylor Jr.	1:37.00
1923	Friar	Steve Donoghue	Willie Waugh	1:43.80
1924	Blue Pete	Edward Gardner	Platt	1:41.80
1925	Sherwood Starr	Charlie Smirke	Reg Day	1:38.40
1926	Review Order	Harry Beasley Jr.	Atty Persse	1:46.80
1927	Kincardine (Note: Maid of Perth finished first, but was disqualified for boring.)	Harry Beasley Jr.	Atty Persse
1928	Speyside	Joe Childs	E Wilson	1:41.00
1929	Rattlin The Reefer	Sir Gordon Richards	Victor Gilpin
1930	Paradine	Bobby Jones	Joseph Lawson	1:42.00
1931	St Oswald	Steve Donoghue	Easterbee	1:42.60
1932	Limelight	Joe Childs	William Jarvis	1:36.40
1933	Fur Tor	Bobby Jones	Joseph Lawson	1:41.60
1934	Medieval Knight	Sir Gordon Richards	Fred Darling	1:40.40
1935	Theft	Sir Gordon Richards	Frank Butters	1:42.00
1936	Thankerton	Harry Wragg	Gerald Armstrong	1:42.00
1937	Lady Of Shalott	Michael Beary	Robert Adams	1:40.80
1938	Cave Man	Sir Gordon Richards	Joseph Lawson	1:38.20
1939	Fairstone	Michael Beary	Harry Cottrill	1:41.80
1940–45	No Race
1946	Sayani	Roger Poincelet	Joseph Lieux	1:45.00
1947	Nebuchadnezzar	Sir Gordon Richards	Fred Darling	1:41.00
1948	Hyperbole	Tommy Weston	Noel Cannon	1:44.40
1949	Star King (Note: The 1949 winner Star King was later exported to Australia and renamed Star Kingdom.)	Doug Smith	John Waugh	1:38.60
1950	Double Eclipse	Harry Carr	Cecil Boyd-Rochfort	1:41.20
1951	Royal Serenade	Charlie Elliott	Harry Wragg	1:39.60
1952	Kara Tepe	Manny Mercer	George Colling	1:39.60
1953	Rhinehart	Sir Gordon Richards	Derrick Candy	1:45.20
1954	Marshal Ney	Rae Johnstone	In Ireland	1:43.40
1955	Windsor Sun	Jimmy Eddery	Seamus McGrath	1:30.29
1956	Adare	Rae Johnstone	Vincent O'Brien	1:31.17
1957	Quorum	Alec Russell	Wilfred Lyde	1:30.35
1958	Faith Healer	Joe Sime	Rufus Beasley	1:28.76
1959	Welsh Guard	Harry Carr	Cecil Boyd-Rochfort	1:29.65
1960	Red Gauntlet	Eph Smith	Ted Leader	1:32.46
1961	Favorita	Lester Piggott	Noel Murless	1:30.70
1962	Catchpole	Doug Smith	Geoffrey Brooke	1:31.86
1963	The Creditor	Lester Piggott	Noel Murless	1:35.32
1964	Young Christopher	Lester Piggott	Freddie Maxwell	1:30.91
1965	Fortezza	Frankie Durr	Harry Wragg	1:30.28
1966	Vibrant	Peter Robinson	Teddy Lambton	1:29.18
1967	St Chad	George Moore	Noel Murless	1:31.00
1968	World Cup	Bill Williamson	Paddy Prendergast	1:29.60
1969	Crooner	John Gorton	Doug Smith	1:31.01
1970	Fluke	George Duffield	John Oxley	1:28.36
1971	Ashleigh	Bill Williamson	Paddy Prendergast	1:36.16
1972	Proof Positive	Pat Eddery	Jeremy Tree	1:29.33
1973	Pitskelly	Bill Williamson	Michael Jarvis	1:34.57
1974	Red Alert	Johnny Roe	Dermot Weld	1:28.78
1975	Gay Fandango	Lester Piggott	Vincent O'Brien	1:30.05
1976	Gwent	Geoff Lewis	Bruce Hobbs	1:28.79
1977	Etienne Gerard	Paul Cook	Michael Stoute	1:33.04
1978	Camden Town	Pat Eddery	Peter Walwyn	1:28.67
1979	Blue Refrain	Brian Rouse	John Benstead	1:29.81
1980	Hard Fought	Lester Piggott	Michael Stoute	1:30.06
1981	Rasa Penang	Lester Piggott	Robert Armstrong	1:28.39
1982	Merlin's Charm	Steve Cauthen	Barry Hills	1:29.82
1983	Tecorno	Willie Carson	Dick Hern	1:28.09
1984	Miss Silca Key	Brian Rouse	David Elsworth	1:28.17
1985	Pennine Walk	Pat Eddery	Jeremy Tree	1:27.71
1986	Cliveden	Greville Starkey	Guy Harwood	1:27.85
1987	Midyan	Steve Cauthen	Henry Cecil	1:30.07
1988	Indian Ridge	Cash Asmussen	David Elsworth	1:26.20
1989	Zilzal	Walter Swinburn	Michael Stoute	1:26.30
1990	Sally Rous	Gary Carter	Geoff Wragg	1:27.16
1991	Satin Flower	Steve Cauthen	John Gosden	1:28.63
1992	Prince Ferdinand	John Reid	Matt McCormack	1:25.94
1993	Ardkinglass	Willie Ryan	Henry Cecil	1:35.68
1994 (dh)	River Deep; Gneiss	Richard Quinn; Paul Eddery	Paul Cole; Julie Cecil	1:28.70
1995	Sergeyev	Richard Hughes	Richard Hannon Sr.	1:27.12
1996	Lucayan Prince	Richard Hughes	David Loder	1:28.35
1997	Among Men	Michael Kinane	Michael Stoute	1:26.66
1998	Diktat	Darryll Holland	David Loder	1:28.43
1999	Lots of Magic	Dane O'Neill	Richard Hannon Sr.	1:26.45
2000	Observatory	Kevin Darley	John Gosden	1:28.93
2001	Mozart	Michael Kinane	Aidan O'Brien	1:27.86
2002	Just James	Olivier Peslier	Jeremy Noseda	1:27.19
2003	Membership	Gary Stevens	Clive Brittain	1:26.64
2004	Kheleyf	Frankie Dettori	Saeed bin Suroor	1:27.35
2005 (Note: The 2005 running took place at York)	Proclamation	Johnny Murtagh	Jeremy Noseda	1:22.82
2006	Jeremy	Michael Kinane	Sir Michael Stoute	1:27.54
2007	Tariq	Jimmy Fortune	Peter Chapple-Hyam	1:26.76
2008	Aqlaam	Richard Hills	William Haggas	1:26.98
2009	Ouqba	Tadhg O'Shea	Barry Hills	1:27.65
2010	Rainfall	Ryan Moore	Mark Johnston	1:24.94
2011	Strong Suit	Richard Hughes	Richard Hannon Sr.	1:26.09
2012	Ishvana	Seamie Heffernan	Aidan O'Brien	1:25.45
2013	Gale Force Ten	Joseph O'Brien	Aidan O'Brien	1:25.32
2014	Mustajeeb	Pat Smullen	Dermot Weld	1:24.54
2015	Dutch Connection	Jim Crowley	Charles Hills	1:26.83
2016	Ribchester	William Buick	Richard Fahey	1:28.49
2017	Le Brivido	Pierre-Charles Boudot	André Fabre	1:25.05
2018	Expert Eye	James McDonald	Sir Michael Stoute	1:26.25
2019	Space Traveller	Daniel Tudhope	Richard Fahey	1:24.57
2020	Molatham	Jim Crowley	Roger Varian	1:28.94
2021	Creative Force	James Doyle	Charlie Appleby	1:29.06
2022	Noble Truth	William Buick	Charlie Appleby	1:26.71
2023	Age of Kings	Wayne Lordan	Aidan O'Brien	1:26.93
2024	Haatem	James Doyle	Richard Hannon Jr.	1:26.85
2025	Noble Champion	Kieran Shoemark	Ed Walker	1:24.99
2026	Thesecretadversary	Seamie Heffernan	Fozzy Stack	1:25.18

== Earlier winners ==
=== Triennial Stakes ===
The second leg of the Triennial Stakes was contested by three-year-olds over 7 furlongs, and it was first run in 1849.

- 1849: Borneo
- 1850: no race
- 1851: Miserrima
- 1852: Songstress
- 1853: Filbert
- 1854: Meteora
- 1855: Claret
- 1856: Fly-by-Night
- 1857–58: no race
- 1859: St Clarence
- 1860: The Wizard
- 1861: Lupus
- 1862: no race
- 1863: Queen Bertha
- 1864: Blair Athol
- 1865: Broomielaw
- 1866: Janitor
- 1867: Vauban
- 1868: Vale Royal
- 1869: Duke of Beaufort
- 1870: Normanby
- 1871: Ripponden
- 1872: Cremorne
- 1873: The Laird of Holywell
- 1874: Volturno
- 1875: Ladylove
- 1876: Morning Star
- 1877: Placida
- 1878: Jannette
- 1879: Dalnaspidal II
- 1880: Muncaster
- 1881: Limestone
- 1882: Shotover
- 1883: Galliard
- 1884: Talisman
- 1885: Dandie Dimont
- 1886: Mephisto
- 1887: Jersey Lily
- 1888: Rada
- 1889: Cherry Bounce
- 1890: Blue-green
- 1891: Peter Flower
- 1892: May Duke
- 1893: Prisoner
- 1894: Florizel II
- 1895: Utica
- 1896: Labrador
- 1897: Cortegar
- 1898: Nun Nicer
- 1899: Santa Casa
- 1900: Rice
- 1901: Veles
- 1902: Fowling-Piece
- 1903: Rabelais
- 1904: Henry the First
- 1905: Polymelus
- 1906: Troutbeck
- 1907: Acclaim
- 1908: Rhodora
- 1909: Louviers
- 1910: Admiral Hawke
- 1911: Alice
- 1912: Hector
- 1913: Light Brigade
- 1914: Sunny Lake
- 1915–18: no race

== See also ==
- Horse racing in Great Britain
- List of British flat horse races
