= Noalcoholic =

French-bred Thoroughbred racehorse

- Sire: Nonoalco
- Grandsire: Nearctic
- Dam: Alea
- Damsire: Galivanter
- Sex: Stallion
- Foaled: 13 March 1977
- Country: France
- Colour: Bay
- Breeder: Pillar Stud
- Owner: William du Pont III
- Trainer: Olivier Douieb; Gavin Pritchard-Gordon
- Record: 28: 10-7-4

Major wins
- Van Geest Stakes (1982); Prix Messidor (1982); Challenge Stakes (1982); Lockinge Stakes (1983); Sussex Stakes (1983)

Awards
- Timeform rating 122 (1982), 128 (1983); Top-rated older miler in Europe (1983)

Noalcoholic (13 March 1977 – December 1997) was a French-bred Thoroughbred racehorse and sire. He showed useful form when trained in France and was set to be exported to stand as a breeding stallion in Australia. During what was intended to be a brief stopover in England in the spring of 1982 he began to show impressive form on the training gallops and was returned to the track in the training of Gavin Pritchard-Gordon. He showed much improved form as a five-year-old, winning the Van Geest Stakes, Prix Messidor and Challenge Stakes as well as finishing second in the Queen Anne Stakes and the Queen Elizabeth II Stakes. He was even better at six, winning the Lockinge Stakes and the Sussex Stakes and being rated the best older horse in Europe over one mile. He was eventually sent to Australia in 1984, where he became a successful breeding stallion.

== Background ==
Noalcoholic was a "big, strong" bay horse with a white blaze bred in France by his owner, William du Pont III's Pillar Stud. His sire Nonoalco won the 2000 Guineas and the Prix Jacques Le Marois in 1974 and stood as a breeding stallion in Europe before being exported to Japan. Noalcoholic's dam Alea was a successful racemare in Italy, winning the Premio Regina Elena in 1970. Alea also produced Noalcoholic's full-sister Amiel, the female-line ancestor of the Preakness Stakes winner Red Bullet.

The colt was initially sent into training with Olivier Douieb in France.

== Racing career ==
=== 1980–1981: early career ===
Noalcoholic was unraced as a two-year-old before beginning his racing career in 1980. He was unbeaten in three races that year, winning twice at Évry Racecourse and then winning the Prix de la Ville de Trouville at Deauville. As a four-year-old was mainly campaigned over distances of around 2000 metres. He ran eight times, recording his only success in a minor race at Deauville.

=== 1982: five-year-old season ===
In early 1982 Noalcoholic it was decided that Noacoholic would be retired from racing and exported to begin a stud career in Australia. On what was intended to be his final start, he won a handicap race over 2100 metres at Longchamp Racecourse in May and was then sent to England to fulfill quarantine requirements. While being lodged at the Shalfleet stable of Gavin Pritchard-Gordon in Newmarket, Suffolk he was tried in a gallop against Buffavento, one of the trainer's best horses, and performed so well that it was decided to keep the horse in training in Europe for the rest of the season. Rather than racing over middle-distances and coming from off the pace as he had done in France, he was converted into a front-running miler.

On his debut for Pritchard-Gordon he started a 33/1 outsider for the Queen Anne Stakes (then a Group Two race open to horses aged three and over) at Royal Ascot and belied his odds by finishing second to the three-year-old Mr Fluorocarbon. In July he attempted to record his first victory in England when he contested the Listed Van Geest Stakes over seven furlongs at Newmarket Racecourse. Ridden by George Duffield, who became his regular jockey, he started at odds of 100/30 and won easily beating Scarrowmanwick by two and a half lengths. As he had never been entered in the summer's top mile events in England, the horse was sent back to France for his next two races. In the Prix Messidor at Maisons-Laffitte Racecourse he dominated the contest from half-way to record his first Group race win, coming home three lengths clear of Big John, a colt who had previously won the Prix de Ris-Orangis and the Prix du Chemin de Fer du Nord. He was then stepped up to Group One level and started second favourite for the Prix Jacques Le Marois at Deauville on 15 August but finished sixth behind The Wonder.

On his return to England, Noalcoholic contested the Queen Elizabeth II Stakes (then a Group Two race) at Ascot in September and finished second to the 50/1 outsider Buzzard's Bay, with Mr Fluorocarbon and the Irish 2,000 Guineas winner Dara Monarch among the other beaten horses. On his final start of the season, he started at odds of 5/2 for the Challenge Stakes over seven furlongs at Newmarket. He got the better of a sustained struggle with Motavato (winner of the Lockinge Stakes and runner-up in the Arlington Million) to prevail by three quarters of a length.

=== 1983: six-year-old season ===
Noalcoholic remained in training with Pritchard-Gordon in 1983. He began the year by finishing second in the Doncaster Mile Stakes in March and was then unplaced in the Prix du Muguet after being boxed in and denied any kind of clear run in the closing stages. On very soft ground at Newbury Racecourse in May he started at odds of 7/2 for the Lockinge Stakes in which he was ridden as usual by Duffield. He disputed the lead from the start before accelerating five lengths clear of his rivals approaching the final furlong. He tired in the closing stages but held on to win by one and a half lengths from Henry Cecil-trained Valiyar.

Noalcoholic was beaten in his next three races. On faster ground Royal Ascot he finished third behind Valiyar and Montekin in the Queen Anne Stakes and was then sent to Ireland where he disappointed when running third to Burslem and Montekin in the Golden Fleece Stakes at Phoenix Park Racecourse. He was then dropped in distance for the six furlong July Cup at Newmarket and finished fifth behind the filly Habibti. On 27 July, Noalcoholic was one of eleven horses to contest the Group One Sussex Stakes over one mile at Goodwood Racecourse and started an 18/1 outsider. The 2000 Guineas winner Lomond started 9/4 favourite ahead of Tolomeo and the Irish 2000 Guineas winner Wassl, whilst the other runners included Montekin, Drumalis (Premio Parioli), Muscatite (Craven Stakes), Thug (Criterion Stakes) and Hays (Mill Reef Stakes). Duffield sent Noalcoholic into the lead soon after the start, kicked clear of his rivals at half distance and never looked in any danger of defeat, winning by two and a half lengths from Tolomeo. He was the longest-priced winner of the race since Queen's Hussar in 1963 and the first six-year-old to win the contest. Duffield was recording his first Group One win at the age of 36.

In his last three races, Noalcoholic failed to win but continued to show consistently good form. In the Prix Jacques Le Marois he finished fifth behind the filly Luth Enchantee after being impeded by the winner in the closing stages and in the Waterford Crystal Mile he finished third to Montekin when conceding eight pounds to his rival. He ended his racing career by finishing second to the three-year-old Salieri in the Challenge Stakes.

== Assessment ==
In 1982, the independent Timeform organisation gave Noalcoholic a rating of 122, twelve pounds below their Horse of the Year Ardross. In their annual Racehorses of 1982 they described him as "thoroughly genuine and consistent". In the following year he was given a Timeform rating of 128, eight pounds behind their Horse of the Year Habibti and two pounds behind their top miler Luth Enchantee. In the official International Classification he was rated the fourth-best older horse in Europe behind the middle-distance performers All Along, Diamond Shoal and Time Charter.

== Stud record ==
Noalcoholic's sojourn in England, ended with a brief spell as a breeding stallion at the Side Hill Stud in Newmarket in early 1984 before he was belatedly sent to begin his stud career in Australia. Standing at the Blue Gum Stud in Victoria, he became a successful sire of winners, with his offspring including the Grade I winners Rechabite (Sires' Produce Stakes (VRC)), Sober Suit (Toorak Handicap) and Vitalic (Caulfield Guineas). He died in December 1997 at the age of twenty.

== Pedigree ==
Pedigree of Noalcoholic (FR), bay stallion, 1977
| Sire Nonoalco (USA) 1971 | Nearctic (CAN); 1954 | Nearco | Pharos |
| Sire Nonoalco (USA) 1971 | Nearctic (CAN); 1954 | Nearco | Nogara |
| Sire Nonoalco (USA) 1971 | Nearctic (CAN); 1954 | Lady Angela | Hyperion |
| Sire Nonoalco (USA) 1971 | Nearctic (CAN); 1954 | Lady Angela | Sister Sarah |
| Sire Nonoalco (USA) 1971 | Seximee (USA); 1966 | Hasty Road | Roman |
| Sire Nonoalco (USA) 1971 | Seximee (USA); 1966 | Hasty Road | Traffic Court |
| Sire Nonoalco (USA) 1971 | Seximee (USA); 1966 | Jambo | Crafty Admiral |
| Sire Nonoalco (USA) 1971 | Seximee (USA); 1966 | Jambo | Bank Account |
| Dam Alea (GB) 1967 | Galivanter (GB); 1956 | Golden Cloud | Gold Bridge |
| Dam Alea (GB) 1967 | Galivanter (GB); 1956 | Golden Cloud | Rainstorm |
| Dam Alea (GB) 1967 | Galivanter (GB); 1956 | Lycia | Nearco |
| Dam Alea (GB) 1967 | Galivanter (GB); 1956 | Lycia | Cleres |
| Dam Alea (GB) 1967 | Alleged (GB); 1959 | Alycidon | Donatello |
| Dam Alea (GB) 1967 | Alleged (GB); 1959 | Alycidon | Aurora |
| Dam Alea (GB) 1967 | Alleged (GB); 1959 | Plain Justice | Court Martial |
| Dam Alea (GB) 1967 | Alleged (GB); 1959 | Plain Justice | Tidworth (Family 16-h) |
