= Zilzal (horse) =

American-bred Thoroughbred racehorse

- Sire: Nureyev
- Grandsire: Northern Dancer
- Dam: French Charmer
- Damsire: Le Fabuleux
- Sex: Stallion
- Foaled: 31 March 1986
- Country: United States
- Colour: Chestnut
- Breeder: Kentucky Select Bloodstock I
- Owner: Mana Al Maktoum
- Trainer: Sir Michael Stoute
- Jockey: Walter Swinburn
- Record: 6: 5-0-0
- Earnings: £397,607

Major wins
- Jersey Stakes (1989); Criterion Stakes (1989); Sussex Stakes (1989); Queen Elizabeth II Stakes (1989)

Awards
- English Horse of the Year (1989); English Champion Three-year-old (1989); Timeform rating: 137

Zilzal (foaled 31 March 1986 – August 13, 2015) was an American-bred, British–trained Thoroughbred racehorse. In a racing career that lasted just over five months, he won five of his six races, including the Sussex Stakes and Queen Elizabeth II Stakes. He was the Horse of the Year in England in 1989 and achieved the highest Timeform rating of the year. Zilzal was owned by Mana Al Maktoum and trained by Sir Michael Stoute. He was ridden by Walter Swinburn in all of his races. Zilzal became a stallion after retiring from racing and sired some top racehorses, including Always Loyal, Among Men, and Faithful Son.

== Background ==
Zilzal was foaled on 31 March 1986, a chestnut colt, he was bred by Kentucky Select Bloodstock. He was sired by Nureyev, who finished first in the 2000 Guineas in 1980 but was disqualified for interfering with other horses. Nureyev only ran three times but became a successful stallion. Amongst his other progeny were the undefeated Fasliyev, 1000 Guineas winner Miesque, Prix de l'Arc de Triomphe winner Peintre Celebre, and Epsom Oaks winner Reams of Verse. Zilzal's dam, French Charmer, was a daughter of Le Fabuleux.

== Racing career ==
Ridden by Walter Swinburn, Zilzal won his first race, a seven_furlong race at Leicester on 30 May 1989, by ten lengths from Mbulwa. At Royal Ascot, he won the Jersey Stakes by four lengths from Russian Royal, with Distant Relative, who went on to win the Sussex Stakes in 1990, a further length back in third place. He then started as the 1/4 favourite in the Criterion Stakes at Newmarket. Zilzal led throughout and beat Russian Bond by five lengths. Russian Bond was two lengths clear of Tay Wharf and Sure Gold, who finished last of the four runners.

He then stepped up in class for the Group 1 Sussex Stakes at Glorious Goodwood. The previous season's winner, Warning, started as the 7/4 favourite, with Zilzal at 5/2, Markofdistinction at 3/1, and St James's Palace Stakes winner Shaadi at 7/1. As the field entered the finishing straight, Zilzal was in third place of the eight runners. He took the lead from Opening Verse with over one furlong left to run and quickened to win by three lengths from 100/1 outsider Green Line Express, with Markofdistinction a further length and a half back in third place.

At the end of September, he faced four rivals in the Queen Elizabeth II Stakes at Ascot. His opponents in the one-mile race were the undefeated Prix Jacques Le Marois winner Polish Precedent, Distant Relative, Green Line Express, and Cottenham. The betting was dominated by the two unbeaten horses, with Zilzal sent off at evens and Polish Precedent at 11/8. Zilzal led throughout and beat Polish Precedent by three lengths, with Distant Relative a further two lengths back in third. In November Zilzal travelled to America for the Breeders' Cup Mile, where he faced ten opponents including Arlington Million winner Steinlen, Simply Majestic, and Sabona. Zilzal started as the even money favourite but finished sixth, about four and a half lengths behind winner Steinlen. He was then retired to stud.

== Race record ==
| Date | Race name | D (F) | Course | Class | Prize | Odds | Runners | Place | Margin (L) | Winner/Runner-up | Time | Jockey | Ref. |
|---|---|---|---|---|---|---|---|---|---|---|---|---|---|
| 30 May 1989 | EBF Stakes | 7 | Leicester | | £2,952 | 13/8 | 10 | 1 | 10 | Mbulwa | 1:25.80 | Walter Swinburn | |
| 21 June 1989 | Jersey Stakes | 7 | Ascot | G3 | £30,293 | 10/11 | 12 | 1 | 4 | Russian Royal | 1:26.30 | Walter Swinburn | |
| 1 July 1989 | Criterion Stakes | 7 | Newmarket | G3 | £19,212 | 1/4 | 4 | 1 | 5 | Russian Bond | 1:25.95 | Walter Swinburn | |
| 26 July 1989 | Sussex Stakes | 8 | Goodwood | G1 | £192,150 | 5/2 | 8 | 1 | 3 | Green Line Express | 1:36.77 | Walter Swinburn | |
| 30 September 1989 | Queen Elizabeth II Stakes | 8 | Ascot | G1 | £153,000 | Evens | 5 | 1 | 3 | Polish Precedent | 1:40.57 | Walter Swinburn | |
| 4 November 1989 | Breeders' Cup Mile | 8 | Gulfstream Park | G1 | £250,000 | Evens | 11 | 6 | 4.75 | Steinlen | 1:37.20 | Walter Swinburn | |

Note: F = Furlongs, L = Lengths

== Assessment ==
At the end of the 1989 season, Zilzal was rated as the joint-best horse with Old Vic on 134, ahead of 2000 Guineas and Derby winner Nashwan. He was given the highest Timeform rating of the year on 137. He was also England's Horse of the Year and Champion Three-year-old.

== Stud career ==
Zilzal first stood at Gainsborough Stud near Versailles in Kentucky. He was retired from stud duties in 2005 due to lack of demand. From his 16 crops, Zilzal sired 396 foals. 320 made it to the track, and 214 of them won 719 races among them. During his stud career, he was treated for infertility problems. However, he did meet with some success as a stallion, siring three Group 1 winners and several Group race winners. His most notable progeny were:

== Later years ==
Champion miler Zilzal was put down, due to the infirmities of old age. He was 29. Due to fertility issues he moved to Lanwades Stud and stood ten seasons from 1996 to 2005 at Kirsten Rausing's Newmarket operation before being retired at the age of 19. Zilzal joined Aston Upthorpe in 2006 and spent the rest of his retirement at the stud near Didcot.

Rausing said: "We had him here for quite a long time, for ten seasons. Before that he was at Gainsborough Stud but he had severe fertility problems in America. I was asked to take him at Lanwades and he came here. He'd covered very small books in America and had got less than 50 per cent of mares in foal over there.

"He covered 60 mares in his first year over here and I think he got most of them in foal. We found him fairly easy to work with, we never had any serious fertility issues with him. I felt such as his problems that they were, short sperm longevity, they could be overcome by careful management of the mares – so we never covered a mare more than once.

"He was a very nice horse in every way, an absolutely picture perfect individual. A lovely horse to look at once you got to know him he was very nice to deal with. We loved him here and he was looked after by Eoin O'Mahony, he looked after him from beginning to end for the ten seasons."

=== Notable progeny ===
s = stallion, m = mare, g = gelding

| Foaled | Name | Sex | Major wins | Ref. |
| 1991 | Zilzal Zamaan | s | Ormonde Stakes |
| 1992 | Shaanxi | m | Prix du Rond Point, Prix d'Astarbe |
| 1993 | Nero Zilzal | s | Prix Exbury |
| 1994 | Always Loyal | m | Poule d'Essai des Pouliches |
| 1994 | Among Men | s | Jersey Stakes, Celebration Mile, Sussex Stakes |
| 1994 | Faithful Son | g | Prince of Wales's Stakes |
| 1999 | Don Fernando | g | Prestbury Juvenile Novices' Hurdle |
| 2000 | Gold Medallist | g | Prix Kergorlay |
| 2002 | I'm So Lucky | g | Celebration Chase |

Zilzal also sired the dams of Poule d'Essai des Pouliches winner Darjina, Hong Kong Horse of the Year Good Ba Ba, Prix de l'Abbaye winner Var and Queen Anne Stakes winner No Excuse Needed.

== Pedigree ==
Pedigree of Zilzal, chestnut stallion, 1986
| Sire Nureyev (USA) b. 1977 | Northern Dancer (CAN) b. 1961 | Nearctic br. 1954 | Nearco |
| Sire Nureyev (USA) b. 1977 | Northern Dancer (CAN) b. 1961 | Nearctic br. 1954 | Lady Angela |
| Sire Nureyev (USA) b. 1977 | Northern Dancer (CAN) b. 1961 | Natalma b. 1957 | Native Dancer |
| Sire Nureyev (USA) b. 1977 | Northern Dancer (CAN) b. 1961 | Natalma b. 1957 | Almahmoud |
| Sire Nureyev (USA) b. 1977 | Special (USA) b. 1969 | Forli ch. 1963 | Aristophanes |
| Sire Nureyev (USA) b. 1977 | Special (USA) b. 1969 | Forli ch. 1963 | Trevisa |
| Sire Nureyev (USA) b. 1977 | Special (USA) b. 1969 | Thong b. 1964 | Nantallah |
| Sire Nureyev (USA) b. 1977 | Special (USA) b. 1969 | Thong b. 1964 | Rough Shod II |
| Dam French Charmer (USA) ch. 1978 | Le Fabuleux (GB) ch. 1961 | Wild Risk b. 1940 | Rialto |
| Dam French Charmer (USA) ch. 1978 | Le Fabuleux (GB) ch. 1961 | Wild Risk b. 1940 | Wild Violet |
| Dam French Charmer (USA) ch. 1978 | Le Fabuleux (GB) ch. 1961 | Anguar b. 1950 | Verso II |
| Dam French Charmer (USA) ch. 1978 | Le Fabuleux (GB) ch. 1961 | Anguar b. 1950 | La Rochelle |
| Dam French Charmer (USA) ch. 1978 | Bold Example (USA) b. 1969 | Bold Lad ch. 1962 | Bold Ruler |
| Dam French Charmer (USA) ch. 1978 | Bold Example (USA) b. 1969 | Bold Lad ch. 1962 | Misty Morn |
| Dam French Charmer (USA) ch. 1978 | Bold Example (USA) b. 1969 | Lady Be Good b. 1956 | Better Self |
| Dam French Charmer (USA) ch. 1978 | Bold Example (USA) b. 1969 | Lady Be Good b. 1956 | Past Eight |

Note: b. = Bay, br. = Brown, ch. = Chestnut

== See also ==
- List of leading Thoroughbred racehorses
