= Sergeyev (horse) =

Irish-bred Thoroughbred racehorse

Sergeyev is a 16-hands chestnut thoroughbred stallion who won the Royal Ascot Jersey Stakes in 1995.
