= Criterion Stakes =

Flat horse race in Britain

- Class: Group 3
- Location: July Course; Newmarket, England
- Inaugurated: 1978
- Race type: Flat / Thoroughbred
- Sponsor: Randox Health
- Website: Newmarket

Race information
- Distance: 7f (1,408 metres)
- Surface: Turf
- Track: Straight
- Qualification: Three-years-old and up
- Weight: 8 st 10 lb (3yo); 9 st 5 lb (4yo+); Allowances; 3 lb for fillies and mares Penalties; 7 lb for Group 1 winners* 5 lb for Group 2 winners * 3 lb for Group 3 winners * * after 31 August 2018
- Purse: £78,696 (2022); 1st: £45,368

Criterion Stakes
2025
Quinault	Room Service	Paborus

Previous years
2024
Noble Dynasty	Nostrum	Witch Hunter
2023
Audience	Jumby	Pogo
2022
Pogo	Sunray Major	Ever Given
2021
Glorious Journey	Motakhayyel	Duke Of Hazzard

2020-2011
2020
Limato	Happy Power	Turjomaan
2019
Limato	Glorious Journey	Suedois
2018
Sir Dancealot	So Beloved	Larchmont Lad
2017
Home Of The Brave	Jungle Cat	Breton Rock
2016
Breton Rock	Adaay	Here Comes When
2015
Markaz	Hors De Combat	Lincoln
2014
Gregorian	Garswood	Eton Forever
2013
Producer	Red Jazz	Pastoral Player
2012
Libranno	Edinburgh Knight	Majestic Myles
2011
Libranno	Pausanias	Beacon Lodge

2010-2001
2010
Premio Loco	Red Jazz	Doncaster Rover
2009
Imbongi	Huntdown	Balthazaar's Gift
2008
Racer Forever	King Of Dixie	Blythe Knight
2007
Silver Touch	Major Cadeaux	Fajr
2006
Suggestive	Mac Love	New Seeker
2005
Vortex	Court Masterpiece	Nayyir
2004
Arakan	Desert Destiny	Trade Fair
2003
Trade Fair	Just James	King of Happiness
2002
Atavus	King Of Happiness	Lady Lindsay
2001
Shibboleth	Reel Buddy	Valentino

2000-1991
2000
Arkadian Hero	Chagall	Showboat
1999
Diktat	Raise A Grand	White Heart
1998
Muchea	Ramooz	Cool Edge
1997
Ramooz	Almushtarak	Wind Cheetah
1996
Gabr	Inzar	Bin Rosie
1995
Pipe Major	Prince Of India	Stylish Ways
1994
Hill Hopper	Elrafa Ah	Bluegrass Prince
1993
Inchinor	Mistle Cat	Inner City
1992
Toussaud	Prince Ferdinand	Casteddu
1991
La Grange Music	Local Lass	Goofalik

1990-1988
1990
Rock City	Aldbourne	Robellation
1989
Zilzal	Russian Bond	Tay Wharf
1988
Cadeaux Genereux	Salse	Scarlet Blade

The Criterion Stakes is a Group 3 flat horse race in Great Britain open to horses aged three years or older. It is run on the July Course at Newmarket over a distance of 7 furlongs (1,408 metres), and it is scheduled to take place each year in late June or early July.

The present Criterion Stakes was established in 1978, and for a period it was classed at Listed level. During the eighties the race was known as the Van Geest Stakes. It was promoted to Group 3 status in 1986. From 2025 it will be run at York.

A previous race with the same name was an important event for two-year-olds. Its winners included Ormonde (1885), Flying Fox (1898), Pretty Polly (1903) and Gay Crusader (1916).

== Records ==
Most successful horse (2 wins):

- Libranno – 2011, 2012
- Limato - 2019, 2020

Leading jockey (3 wins):

- Richard Hughes – Trade Fair (2003), Libranno (2012), Producer (2013)

Leading trainer (5 wins):

- John Gosden – Toussaud (1992), Hill Hopper (1994), Racer Forever (2008), Gregorian (2014), Audience (2023)

== Winners ==
Year	Winner	Age	Jockey	Trainer	Time
1978	Daring March	4	George Duffield	James Bethell	1:28.19
1979	Alert	3	Eric Eldin	Clive Brittain	1:25.29
1980	Captain Nick	4	Jimmy Bleasdale	Jeremy Hindley	1:26.24
1981	Dalsaan	4	Edward Hide	Sir Michael Stoute	1:25.23
1982	Noalcoholic	5	George Duffield	Gavin Pritchard-Gordon	1:28.11
1983	Thug	3	Brian Taylor	Jeremy Hindley	1:26.96
1984	Grey Desire	4	Benjy Coogan	Denis Plant	1:23.80
1985	Capricorn Belle	4	Rae Guest	Luca Cumani	1:26.36
1986	Mister Wonderful	3	Tony Ives	John Dunlop	1:25.51
1987	Linda's Magic	3	Willie Carson	Robert Armstrong	1:27.95
1988	Cadeaux Genereux	3	Pat Eddery	Olivier Douieb	1:24.19
1989	Zilzal	3	Walter Swinburn	Sir Michael Stoute	1:25.95
1990	Rock City	3	Bruce Raymond	Richard Hannon Sr.	1:25.61
1991	La Grange Music	4	Walter Swinburn	James Fanshawe	1:25.89
1992	Toussaud	3	Pat Eddery	John Gosden	1:24.80
1993	Inchinor	3	Richard Quinn	Roger Charlton	1:23.56
1994	Hill Hopper	3	Philip Robinson	John Gosden	1:26.43
1995	Pipe Major	3	Jason Weaver	Patrick Haslam	1:25.00
1996	Gabr	6	Richard Hills	Robert Armstrong	1:24.04
1997	Ramooz	4	Willie Ryan	Ben Hanbury	1:27.59
1998	Muchea	4	David Harrison	Mick Channon	1:25.66
1999	Diktat	4	Frankie Dettori	Saeed bin Suroor	1:24.63
2000	Arkadian Hero	5	Jamie Spencer	Luca Cumani	1:24.14
2001	Shibboleth	4	Richard Quinn	Sir Henry Cecil	1:23.66
2002	Atavus	5	Jamie Mackay	George Margarson	1:25.17
2003	Trade Fair	3	Richard Hughes	Roger Charlton	1:23.84
2004	Arakan	4	Kieren Fallon	Sir Michael Stoute	1:25.04
2005	Vortex	6	Micky Fenton	Gay Kelleway	1:25.19
2006	Suggestive	8	Nicky Mackay	William Haggas	1:24.16
2007	Silver Touch	4	Tadhg O'Shea	Mick Channon	1:28.03
2008	Racer Forever	5	Jimmy Fortune	John Gosden	1:25.41
2009	Imbongi	5	Kevin Shea	Mike de Kock	1:24.83
2010	Premio Loco	6	Jack Mitchell	Chris Wall	1:24.74
2011	Libranno	3	Ryan Moore	Richard Hannon Sr.	1:23.56
2012	Libranno	4	Richard Hughes	Richard Hannon Sr.	1:24.66
2013	Producer	4	Richard Hughes	Richard Hannon Sr.	1:23.09
2014	Gregorian	5	William Buick	John Gosden	1:26.78
2015	Markaz	3	Dane O'Neill	Barry Hills	1:23.37
2016	Breton Rock	6	Martin Harley	David Simcock	1:29.90
2017	Home Of The Brave	5	James Doyle	Hugo Palmer	1:23.13
2018	Sir Dancealot	4	Gérald Mossé	David Elsworth	1:26.12
2019	Limato	7	Harry Bentley	Henry Candy	1:24.51
2020 (Note: The 2020 race was run on Newmarket's Rowley Mile course due to the COVID-19 pandemic in the United Kingdom)	Limato	8	Adam Kirby	Henry Candy	1:22.81
2021	Glorious Journey	6	James Doyle	Charlie Appleby	1:22.95
2022	Pogo	6	Kieran Shoemark	Charles Hills	1:24.88
2023	Audience	4	Robert Havlin	John & Thady Gosden	1:22.76
2024	Noble Dynasty	6	William Buick	Charlie Appleby	1:23.12
2025	Quinault	5	Jason Hart	Stuart Williams	1:23.56
2026	Qirat	5	Silvestre De Sousa	Ralph Beckett	1:23.40

== See also ==
- Horse racing in Great Britain
- List of British flat horse races
