= Lockinge Stakes =

Flat horse race in Britain

- Class: Group 1
- Location: Newbury Racecourse; Newbury, England
- Inaugurated: 1958
- Race type: Flat / Thoroughbred
- Sponsor: Al Shaqab
- Website: Newbury

Race information
- Distance: 1 mile (1,609 metres)
- Surface: Turf
- Track: Straight
- Qualification: Four-years-old and up
- Weight: 9 st 0 lb Allowances; 3 lb for fillies and mares
- Purse: £350,000 (2022); 1st: £198,485

Lockinge Stakes
2026
Notable Speech	More Thunder	Zeus Olympios

Previous years
2025
Lead Artist	Dancing Gemini	Rosallion
2024
Audience	Charyn	Witch Hunter
2023
Modern Games	Chindit	Berkshire Shadow
2022
Baaeed	Real World	Chindit
2021
Palace Pier	Lady Bowthorpe	Top Rank

2020-2011
2019
Mustashry	Laurens	Accidental Agent
2018
Rhododendron	Lightning Spear	Lancaster Bomber
2017
Ribchester	Lightning Spear	Breton Rock
2016
Belardo	Euro Charline	Endless Drama
2015
Night of Thunder	Toormore	Arod
2014
Olympic Glory	Tullius	Verrazano
2013
Farhh	Sovereign Debt	Aljamaaheer
2012
Frankel	Excelebration	Dubawi Gold
2011
Canford Cliffs	Worthadd	Premio Loco

2010-2001
2010
Paco Boy	Ouqba	Lord Shanakill
2009
Virtual	Alexandros	Twice Over
2008
Creachadoir	Phoenix Tower	Tariq
2007
Red Evie	Ramonti	Passager
2006
Peeress	Majors Cast	Court Masterpiece
2005
Rakti	Mac Love	Hurricane Alan
2004
Russian Rhythm	Salselon	Norse Dancer
2003
Hawk Wing	Where Or When	Olden Times
2002
Keltos	Noverre	Olden Times
2001
Medicean	Warningford	Swallow Flight

2000-1991
2000
Aljabr	Trans Island	Indian Lodge
1999
Fly to the Stars	Jim And Tonic	Almushtarak
1998
Cape Cross	Poteen	Centre Stalls
1997
First Island	Ali-Royal	Even Top
1996
Soviet Line	Charnwood Forest	Spectrum
1995
Soviet Line	Young Ern	Missed Flight
1994
Emperor Jones	Alflora	Missed Flight
1993
Swing Low	Wharf	Culture Vulture
1992
Selkirk	Lahib	Rudimentary
1991
Polar Falcon	In The Groove	Candy Glen

1990-1981
1990
Safawan	Distant Relative	Monsagem
1989
Most Welcome	Warning	Reprimand
1988
Broken Hearted	Prince Rupert	Patriach
1987
Then Again	Vertige	Hadeer
1986
Scottish Reel	Teleprompter	Supreme Leader
1985
Prismatic	Teleprompter	Sarab
1984
Cormorant Wood	Wassl	Welsh Idol
1983
Noalcoholic	Valiyar	Rebollino
1982
Motavato	Noalto	Beldale Lustre
1981
Belmont Bay	Hilal	Dalsaan

1980-1976
1980
Kris	Foveros	Hardgreen
1979
Young Generation	Skyliner	Formidable
1978
Don	Camden Town	Ovac
1977
Relkino	Jellaby	Thieving Demon
1976
El Rastro	Dominion	Ardoon

The Lockinge Stakes is a Group 1 flat horse race in Great Britain open to horses aged four years or older. It is run over a distance of 1 mile (1,609 metres) at Newbury in May.

== History ==
The event is named after Lockinge, a civil parish located to the north of Newbury. It was established in 1958, and originally open to horses aged three or older. The first edition was won by that year's 2000 Guineas Stakes winner Pall Mall. The horse repeated his success as a four-year-old in 1959.

The present race grading system was introduced in 1971, and the Lockinge Stakes was given Group 2 status. It was abandoned due to torrential rain in 1975.

The event was relegated to Group 3 level in 1983, and promoted back to Group 2 in 1985. It was raised to Group 1 and closed to three-year-olds in 1995.

The Lockinge Stakes became part of the British Champions Series in 2011. It is currently the second race in the mile division, which concludes with the Queen Elizabeth II Stakes in October.

The leading horses from the Lockinge Stakes often go on to compete in the Queen Anne Stakes. The last to win both races in the same year was Frankel in 2012.

== Records ==
Most successful horse (2 wins):

- Pall Mall – 1958, 1959
- Welsh Pageant – 1970, 1971
- Soviet Line – 1995, 1996

Leading jockey (6 wins):

- Lester Piggott – Sovereign Path (1960), The Creditor (1964), Sparkler (1973), Belmont Bay (1981), Polar Falcon (1991), Swing Low (1993)

Leading trainer (8 wins):

- Sir Michael Stoute – Scottish Reel (1986), Safawan (1990), Soviet Line (1995, 1996), Medicean (2001), Russian Rhythm (2004), Peeress (2006), Mustashry (2019)

Leading owner (10 wins):

- Godolphin – Cape Cross (1998), Fly to the Stars (1999), Aljabr (2000), Creachadoir (2008), Farhh (2013), Night of Thunder (2015), Belardo (2016), Ribchester (2017), Modern Games (2023), Notable Speech (2026)

== Winners ==
Year	Winner	Age	Jockey	Trainer	Owner	Time
1958	Pall Mall	3	Harry Carr	Cecil Boyd-Rochfort	Queen Elizabeth II	1:46.40
1959	Pall Mall	4	Harry Carr	Cecil Boyd-Rochfort	Queen Elizabeth II	1:41.00
1960	Sovereign Path	4	Lester Piggott	Ron Mason	Ron Mason	1:41.20
1961	Prince Midge	3	Duncan Keith	Jack Colling	Jakie Astor	1:38.40
1962	Superstition	3	David Morris	Cecil Boyd-Rochfort	Hope Goddard Iselin	1:35.60
1963	Queen's Hussar	3	Scobie Breasley	Atty Corbett	6th Earl of Carnarvon	1:41.20
1964	The Creditor	4	Lester Piggott	Noel Murless	Lady Sassoon	1:41.60
1965	Young Christopher	4	Bill Williamson	Freddie Maxwell	J. McShane	1:46.60
1966	Silly Season	4	Geoff Lewis	Ian Balding	Paul Mellon	1:40.80
1967	Bluerullah	4	Bill Williamson	Seamus McGrath	Seamus McGrath	1:42.80
1968	Supreme Sovereign	4	Ron Hutchinson	Harry Wragg	Mrs R. Hodges	1:49.00
1969	Habitat	3	Ron Hutchinson	Fulke Johnson Houghton	Charles Engelhard	1:47.20
1970	Welsh Pageant	4	Sandy Barclay	Noel Murless	Jim Joel	1:38.80
1971	Welsh Pageant	5	Geoff Lewis	Noel Murless	Jim Joel	1:37.70
1972	Brigadier Gerard	4	Joe Mercer	Dick Hern	Jean Hislop	1:41.40
1973	Sparkler	5	Lester Piggott	Robert Armstrong	Maria Mehl-Mülhens	1:39.30
1974	Boldboy	4	Joe Mercer	Dick Hern	Lady Beaverbrook	1:41.60
1975	Abandoned due to waterlogging
1976	El Rastro	6	Bill Pyers	Angel Penna	Daniel Wildenstein	1:40.80
1977	Relkino	4	Willie Carson	Dick Hern	Lady Beaverbrook	1:45.80
1978	Don	4	Brian Rouse	Bill Elsey	Eugene Ryan	1:41.60
1979	Young Generation	3	Greville Starkey	Guy Harwood	Tony Ward
1980	Kris	4	Joe Mercer	Henry Cecil	Lord Howard de Walden	1:36.21
1981	Belmont Bay	4	Lester Piggott	Henry Cecil	Daniel Wildenstein	1:45.90
1982	Motavato	4	Steve Cauthen	Barry Hills	Robert Sangster	1:42.14
1983	Noalcoholic	6	George Duffield	Gavin Pritchard-Gordon	William du Pont III	1:50.17
1984 (dh)	Cormorant Wood; Wassl	4; 4	Steve Cauthen; Willie Carson	Barry Hills; John Dunlop	Bobby McAlpine; Ahmed Al Maktoum	1:39.79
1985	Prismatic	3	Paul Eddery	Henry Cecil	Lord Howard de Walden	1:38.60
1986	Scottish Reel	4	Walter Swinburn	Michael Stoute	Cheveley Park Stud	1:40.10
1987	Then Again	4	Ray Cochrane	Luca Cumani	Richard Shannon	1:37.71
1988	Broken Hearted	4	Richard Quinn	Paul Cole	Fahd Salman	1:39.41
1989	Most Welcome	5	Paul Eddery	Geoff Wragg	Sir Philip Oppenheimer	1:36.52
1990	Safawan	4	Walter Swinburn	Michael Stoute	Patricia Thompson	1:36.42
1991	Polar Falcon	4	Lester Piggott	John Hammond	David Thompson	1:42.70
1992	Selkirk	4	Ray Cochrane	Ian Balding	George Strawbridge	1:36.99
1993	Swing Low	4	Lester Piggott	Richard Hannon Sr.	Roldvale Ltd	1:39.31
1994	Emperor Jones	4	Frankie Dettori	John Gosden	Sheikh Mohammed	1:35.76
1995	Soviet Line	5	Walter Swinburn	Michael Stoute	Maktoum Al Maktoum	1:36.96
1996	Soviet Line	6	Richard Quinn	Michael Stoute	Maktoum Al Maktoum	1:44.22
1997	First Island	5	Michael Hills	Geoff Wragg	Mollers Racing	1:40.04
1998	Cape Cross	4	Daragh O'Donohoe	Saeed bin Suroor	Godolphin	1:35.33
1999	Fly to the Stars	5	Willie Supple	Saeed bin Suroor	Godolphin	1:39.64
2000	Aljabr	4	Frankie Dettori	Saeed bin Suroor	Godolphin	1:37.64
2001	Medicean	4	Kieren Fallon	Sir Michael Stoute	Cheveley Park Stud	1:45.39
2002	Keltos	4	Olivier Peslier	Carlos Laffon-Parias	Tanaka / Marinopoulos	1:38.69
2003	Hawk Wing	4	Michael Kinane	Aidan O'Brien	Sue Magnier	1:36.78
2004	Russian Rhythm	4	Kieren Fallon	Sir Michael Stoute	Cheveley Park Stud	1:37.00
2005	Rakti	6	Philip Robinson	Michael Jarvis	Gary Tanaka	1:33.59
2006	Peeress	5	Kieren Fallon	Sir Michael Stoute	Cheveley Park Stud	1:44.57
2007	Red Evie	4	Jamie Spencer	Michael Bell	Terry Neill	1:40.43
2008	Creachadoir	4	Frankie Dettori	Saeed bin Suroor	Godolphin	1:38.70
2009	Virtual	4	Jimmy Fortune	John Gosden	Cheveley Park Stud	1:40.32
2010	Paco Boy	5	Richard Hughes	Richard Hannon Sr.	Calvera Partnership 2	1:37.31
2011	Canford Cliffs	4	Richard Hughes	Richard Hannon Sr.	Heffer / Tabor / Smith	1:36.52
2012	Frankel	4	Tom Queally	Sir Henry Cecil	Khalid Abdullah	1:38.14
2013	Farhh	5	Silvestre de Sousa	Saeed bin Suroor	Godolphin	1:35.43
2014	Olympic Glory	4	Frankie Dettori	Richard Hannon Jr.	Al Shaqab Racing	1:36.98
2015	Night of Thunder	4	James Doyle	Richard Hannon Jr.	Godolphin	1:38.09
2016	Belardo	4	Andrea Atzeni	Roger Varian	Godolphin	1:38.18
2017	Ribchester	4	William Buick	Richard Fahey	Godolphin	1:43.00
2018	Rhododendron	4	Ryan Moore	Aidan O'Brien	Magnier / Tabor / Smith	1:35.07
2019	Mustashry	6	Jim Crowley	Sir Michael Stoute	Hamdan Al Maktoum	1:35.80
2020	no race (Note: The 2020 running was cancelled due to the COVID-19 pandemic in the United Kingdom)
2021	Palace Pier	4	Frankie Dettori	John & Thady Gosden	Sheikh Hamdan bin Mohammed Al Maktoum	1:40.96
2022	Baaeed	4	Jim Crowley	William Haggas	Shadwell Estate	1:35.71
2023	Modern Games	4	William Buick	Charlie Appleby	Godolphin	1:36.09
2024	Audience	5	Rab Havlin	John & Thady Gosden	Cheveley Park Stud	1:35.29
2025	Lead Artist	4	Oisin Murphy	John & Thady Gosden	Juddmonte	1:35.06
2026	Notable Speech	5	William Buick	Charlie Appleby	Godolphin	1:36:27

== See also ==
- Horse racing in Great Britain
- List of British flat horse races
