= Premier Stayers' Hurdle =

Premier Stayers' Hurdle
2004
Sh Boom	Royal Rosa	Turtle Soup

Previous years
2003
Lord Transcend	Deano's Beeno	Stromness
2002
Jair Du Cochet	Telemoss	It Takes Time

2000-1991
2000
Behrajan	Merry Masquerade	Anzum
1999
Deano's Beeno	Moorish	Pharanear
1998
Ocean Hawk	Paddy's Return	Mighty Moss
1997
Ocean Hawk	Pleasure Shared	Top Spin
1996
Better Times Ahead	Putty Road	Strawberry Angel
1995
Mudahim	Her Honour	Royal Athlete
1994
Simpson	Avro Anson	Sweet Duke
1993
Pragada	Better Times Ahead	Burgoyne
1992
Trapper John	Burgoyne	Upton Park

1990-1989
1990
Mrs Muck	Trapper John	Pertemps Network
1989
Out of the Gloom	Miss Nero	Rustle

The Premier Stayers' Hurdle was a Grade 2 National Hunt hurdle race in England which was open to horses aged five years or older. It was run at Haydock Park over a distance of 2 miles and 7½f furlongs (4,727 metres), and it was scheduled to take place each year in January.

The race was first run in 1970 and run for the last time in 2004. It was replaced on the card (Peter Marsh Chase and Champion Hurdle Trial day) by a handicap hurdle race over the same distance.

The race was awarded Grade 2 status in 1992.

== Winners ==
Year	Winner	Age	Jockey	Trainer
1970	Clever Scot	5	Bob Davies	Colin Davies
1971	Colonel Imp	9	Brian Fletcher	Denys Smith
1972	Notification	7	Ken White	Fred Rimell
1973	Be My Guest	5	Brian Fletcher	B Wilkinson
1974	Abandoned because of waterlogged state of course
1975	Moyne Royal	10	Jeff King	Arthur Pitt
1976	Abandoned because of waterlogged state of course
1977	Abandoned because of waterlogged slate of course
1978	Abandoned because of frost
1979	Abandoned because of frost
1980	Abandoned because of waterlogged state of course
1981	Richdee	5	Colin Hawkins	Neville Crump
1982	Shell Burst	7	Hywel Davies	Les Kennard
1983	Here's Why	6	Jonjo O'Neill	Josh Gifford
1984	Abandoned because of frost
1985	Abandoned because of frost
1986	Sheer Gold	6	Graham Bradley	Toby Balding
1987	Aonoch	8	Jimmy Duggan	Mrs Sally Oliver
1988	Abandoned because of snow
1989	Out of The Gloom	8	Peter Scudamore	Martin Pipe
1990	Mrs Muck	9	Graham Bradley	Nigel Twiston-Davies
1991	Abandoned because of frost
1992	Trapper John	8	Charlie Swan	Mouse Morris
1993	Pragada	10	Peter Scudamore	Martin Pipe
1994	Simpson	9	Tom Grantham	Jim Old
1995	Mudahim	9	Norman Williamson	Chris Broad
1996	Better Times Ahead	10	Tony Dobbin	Gordon W. Richards
1997	Ocean Hawk	5	Carl Llewellyn	Nigel Twiston-Davies
1998	Ocean Hawk	6	Carl Llewellyn	Nigel Twiston-Davies
1999	Deano's Beeno	7	Jamie Osborne	Martin Pipe
2000	Behrajan	5	Andrew Thornton	Henry Daly
2001	Abandoned because of frost
2002	Jair Du Cochet	5	Jacques Ricou	Guillaume Macaire
2003	Lord Transcend	6	Tony Dobbin	J Howard Johnson
2004	Sh Boom	6	Liam Cooper	Jonjo O'Neill
