= Intikhab =

American-bred Thoroughbred racehorse

- Sire: Red Ransom
- Grandsire: Roberto
- Dam: Crafty Example
- Damsire: Crafty Prospector
- Sex: Stallion
- Foaled: 8 May 1994
- Died: 22 May 2016 (aged 22)
- Country: United States
- Colour: Bay
- Breeder: J I Racing Inc and Marvin Little Jr
- Owner: Hamdan Al Maktoum; Godolphin Racing (2004)
- Trainer: David Morley; Saeed bin Suroor (2004)
- Record: 14: 8-5-0
- Earnings: £233,396

Major wins
- Diomed Stakes (1998); Queen Anne Stakes (1998)

Awards
- Timeform rating 136
- Last updated on September 7, 2007

Intikhab (8 May 1994 – 22 May 2016) was an American-bred racehorse who was trained in both the United Kingdom and Dubai. His reputation rested on wide margin victories in the Diomed Stakes at Epsom and the Queen Anne Stakes at Royal Ascot in June 1998. Although he never won (or even contested) a Group One race that season, his two wins were impressive enough to make him one of the highest-rated horses in the world. He later became a successful breeding stallion, siring the multiple Group One winner Snow Fairy and the leading miler Red Evie.
