= Cormorant Wood =

British Thoroughbred racehorse

- Sire: Home Guard
- Grandsire: Forli
- Dam: Quarry Wood
- Damsire: Super Sam
- Sex: Mare
- Foaled: 6 March 1980
- Country: United Kingdom
- Colour: Dark bay or brown
- Breeder: Robert McAlpine
- Owner: Robert McAlpine
- Trainer: Barry Hills
- Record: 13: 6-1-1

Major wins
- Sun Chariot Stakes (1983); Champion Stakes (1983); Lockinge Stakes (1984); Benson and Hedges Gold Cup (1984)

Awards
- Timeform rating 130 (1984); Top-rated European filly or mare (1984)

Cormorant Wood (foaled 4 March 1980) was a British Thoroughbred racehorse and broodmare. She showed useful form in the early part of her career but developed into a top-class runner in the second half of her three-year-old season, winning the Sun Chariot Stakes and Champion Stakes at Newmarket Racecourse in October 1983. Her four-year-old season was curtailed by injury, but she became the first filly to win the Lockinge Stakes and produced her best performance in her final race when she won the Benson and Hedges Gold Cup at York Racecourse. At the end of the year she was the highest-rated female racehorse trained in Europe. Cormorant Wood was retired to stud where she had some success as a producer of winners.

== Background ==
Cormorant Wood was a big, rangy, dark bay mare with a white star and snip bred by her owner Robert McAlpine. She was sired by Home Guard, a horse who showed his best form over sprint distances, winning the Hungerford Stakes and the Diadem Stakes in 1972. Her dam, Quarry Wood was a long-distance handicapper who won four races and finished fifth in the Chester Cup. Her previous foals had made no impact, but she went on to produce River Ceiriog, who won the Supreme Novices' Hurdle at the 1986 Cheltenham Festival. The filly was trained by Barry Hills at his South Bank stable at Lambourn in Berkshire and was ridden to her biggest wins by the American jockey Steve Cauthen.

== Racing career ==
=== 1982: two-year-old season ===
Cormorent Wood ran twice as a two-year-old, finishing unplaced in a six furlong maiden race and then winning a similar event over a furlong further.

=== 1983: three-year-old season ===
In the early part of 1983, Cormorant Wood was campaigned over one and a half miles with the Oaks Stakes as her main target. She prepared for the race with a run in the Group Three Oaks Trial Stakes at Lingfield Park Racecourse in May and showed promise in finishing second, five lengths behind the leading Irish filly Give Thanks. At Epsom Downs Racecourse on 4 June Cormorant Wood was ridden by Lester Piggott and started at odds of 11/1 in the Oaks. She raced in second place for most of the distance, but weakened in the last quarter mile to finish sixth of the fifteen runners behind Sun Princess. In July she was matched against colts and older horses for the first time in the Group Two Princess of Wales's Stakes at Newmarket Racecourse. As at Epsom, she raced prominently before tiring in the closing stages and finishing seventh behind the Irish colt Quilted.

For her next three races, Cormorant Wood was brought back in distance to ten furlongs and showed improved form. In the Virginia Stakes, a new race run at Newcastle Racecourse in August she recorded her first success of the year when beating Air Distingue, a filly who had finished third in the Prix de Diane. In early October at Newmarket she was ridden by Steve Cauthen in the Sun Chariot Stakes and won her first Group race, beating Sedra by a length at odds of 7/2. Two weeks later, over the same course and distance she started at odds of 18/1 in a field of nineteen runners for the Champion Stakes. Her opponents included the Group One winners Wassl (Irish 2,000 Guineas), Tolomeo (Arlington Million) and Be My Native (Coronation Cup). In a race run in a gale force side wind, Cauthen restrained the filly in the early stages and she was still in last place with three furlongs to run. She then produced a burst of acceleration which, according to Timeform, "had to be seen to be believed", overtaking the entire field and winning by a head from Tolomeo, with Flame of Tara a short head away in third. Many of the jockeys struggled to keep their mounts running straight in the conditions and Tolomeo was subsequently disqualified for causing interference. Cauthen's performance was highly praised, with the BBC's Jimmy Lindley commenting on the American's "anticipation, coolness and quick thinking".

On her final appearance of the season, Cormorant Wood was again tried over one and a half miles when she was sent to the United States to contest the Washington, D.C. International Stakes. Once again, she failed to stay the distance, finishing fifth of the eight runners behind All Along.

=== 1984: four-year-old season ===
Cormorant Wood was brought back to one mile for her four-year-old debut for the Lockinge Stakes (then a Group Three) race at Newbury Racecourse in May. She overtook Wassl inside the final furlong, but the colt rallied in the final strides to force a dead heat. She attempted one mile again at Royal Ascot in June when she contested the Queen Anne Stakes, which was then a Group Two race open to horses aged three and older. She finished third behind the three-year-old colt Trojan Fen. In July she returned to her best distance of one and quarter miles and attempted to become the first female to win the Eclipse Stakes at Sandown Park Racecourse. She finished sixth behind the Irish-trained colt Sadler's Wells.

In August, Cormorant Wood and Sadler's Wells met again in the Benson and Hedges Gold Cup at York Racecourse where her other opponent included Tolomeo and the leading British miler Chief Singer. Starting as a 15/1 outsider, the filly was held up by Cauthen towards the back of the field before moving forward in the straight. She took the lead a furlong from the finish and went clear of the field to win by two and a half lengths from Tolomeo, with Chief Singer and Sadler's Wells in third and fourth. On the day following her victory, Cormorant Wood's leg was found to be badly swollen. Examinations revealed a serious tendon injury which ended her racing career.

== Assessment ==
The independent Timeform organisation gave Cormorant Wood a rating of 125 as a three-year-old in 1983. The official International Classification rated her on 83, making her the fifth-best three-year old filly in Europe behind Habibti, Sun Princess, Luth Enchantee and Sharaya. In the following year she was awarded a rating of 130 by Timeform, whilst the International Classification rated her on 88, making her the highest-rated female racehorse of the year ahead of Time Charter, All Along and Northern Trick. In their book, A Century of Champions, based on the Timeform rating system, John Randall and Tony Morris rated Cormorant Wood the sixteenth best British or Irish filly of the 20th century.

== Stud record ==
Cormorant Wood was retired from racing to become a broodmare. By far the best of her offspring was Rock Hopper, a colt sired by Shareef Dancer, who raced in the colours of Maktoum Al Maktoum: in a four-year racing career he won nine races including the Hardwicke Stakes (twice), Yorkshire Cup, Princess of Wales's Stakes and Jockey Club Stakes. Her other good winner was Cliveden Gail, an Irish-trained mare who was successful in long-distance handicaps including the Irish Cesarewitch and the Leopardstown November Handicap.

== Pedigree ==
Pedigree of Cormorant Wood (GB), dark bay or brown mare, 1980
Sire Home Guard (USA) 1969	Forli (ARG); 1963	Aristophanes	Hyperion
Sire Home Guard (USA) 1969	Forli (ARG); 1963	Aristophanes	Commotion
Sire Home Guard (USA) 1969	Forli (ARG); 1963	Trevisa	Advocate
Sire Home Guard (USA) 1969	Forli (ARG); 1963	Trevisa	Veneta
Sire Home Guard (USA) 1969	Stay At Home (USA); 1961	Bold Ruler	Nasrullah
Sire Home Guard (USA) 1969	Stay At Home (USA); 1961	Bold Ruler	Miss Disco
Sire Home Guard (USA) 1969	Stay At Home (USA); 1961	Alanesian	Polynesian
Sire Home Guard (USA) 1969	Stay At Home (USA); 1961	Alanesian	Alablue
Dam Quarry Wood (GB) 1968	Super Sam (IRE); 1962	Above Suspicion	Court Martial
Dam Quarry Wood (GB) 1968	Super Sam (IRE); 1962	Above Suspicion	Above Board
Dam Quarry Wood (GB) 1968	Super Sam (IRE); 1962	Samaria	Migoli
Dam Quarry Wood (GB) 1968	Super Sam (IRE); 1962	Samaria	Sarie
Dam Quarry Wood (GB) 1968	Phrygia (GB); 1956	Mossborough	Nearco
Dam Quarry Wood (GB) 1968	Phrygia (GB); 1956	Mossborough	All Moonshine
Dam Quarry Wood (GB) 1968	Phrygia (GB); 1956	Lenaea	Marsyas
Dam Quarry Wood (GB) 1968	Phrygia (GB); 1956	Lenaea	Whirling Rustom (Family:2-n)
