= George Duffield =

English jockey

George Duffield MBE
Personal information
- Born: 30 November 1946 (age 79) Stanley, West Yorkshire, England
- Occupation: Jockey

Horse racing career
- Sport: Horse racing
- Career wins: 2,547

Major racing wins
- British Classic Races: Epsom Oaks (1992); St. Leger Stakes (1992); Other major races: Champion Stakes (1998, 1999); Eclipse Stakes (1991, 2000); Falmouth Stakes (1980); Flying Five Stakes (2002); Grand Prix de Saint-Cloud (1993); Irish Oaks (1992); King's Stand Stakes (1996); Lockinge Stakes (1983); Matron Stakes (2000); Nassau Stakes (1996, 1998); Nunthorpe Stakes (1996); Oaks Stakes (1992); St Leger Stakes (1992); Sun Chariot Stakes (1996); Sussex Stakes (1983); Racing Post Trophy (1999); Yorkshire Oaks (1992)

Racing awards
- Lester Award (1998, 1999, 2001)

Honours
- Order of the British Empire

Significant horses
- Alborada, Aristotle, Environment Friend, Giant's Causeway, Noalcoholic, Pivotal, User Friendly
- Updated on 21 January 2022

George Duffield (born 30 November 1946) is an English retired flat racing jockey.

He served a seven-year apprenticeship with Jack Waugh, and rode his first winner on 15 June 1967 at Great Yarmouth Racecourse on a horse called Syllable, trained by Waugh.

He became stable jockey for trainer John Oxley in 1970, but this was not to be a successful partnership and they split in 1972. After riding freelance, he became first jockey to trainer Sir Mark Prescott in 1974, an enduring and fruitful partnership: Duffield spent 30 years as stable jockey to Prescott, riding 830 winners for him, including successes in Ireland, France and Belgium.

Duffield became better known in 1992 thanks to the exploits of the three-year-old filly User Friendly, trained by Clive Brittain, at Newmarket. User Friendly gave Duffield his first Classic success when winning The Oaks, she followed up by winning the Irish Oaks, Yorkshire Oaks and St. Leger Stakes, before going down by a neck to Subotica in the Prix de l'Arc de Triomphe at Hippodrome de Longchamp.

Other big race victories included back to back Champion Stakes wins on the Prescott trained Alborada in 1998 and 1999, as well as landing major gambles on the Prescott trained handicapper Pasternak in the 1997 John Smith's Magnet Cup and Cambridgeshire Handicap.

Duffield was also employed by Aidan O'Brien and had two Group 1 victories for the Ballydoyle stable, winning the 1999 Racing Post Trophy on Aristotle and the 2000 Eclipse Stakes on Giant's Causeway. He had previously won the Eclipse Stakes in 1991 on the 28-1 chance Environment Friend.

Other major race victories include Noalcoholic in the Sussex Stakes at Goodwood, Pivotal in the Nunthorpe Stakes at York and King's Stand Stakes at Royal Ascot, Nassau Stakes at Goodwood on both Last Second and Alborada and Champion Turf horse Hasten To Add in the Tote Ebor at York.

Duffield also entered the Guinness Book of Records in 1980, for winning 11 consecutive races (and 13 in all) on the two-year-old Spindrifter.

He was awarded the MBE in 2003 for his services to British Horse Racing.

Duffield's autobiography, Gentleman George, was published in 2002; in it, he admitted punching BHB chairman Peter Savill during a row at Beverley.

In total he rode 2,547 winners placing him at No. 10 in the all-time list in Britain, he twice rode over 100 winners in a season, the first time in 1992, but his best season in terms of winners was in 1993 when he had 116 successes.

His last winner was in 2004, although he did not announce his retirement until the following year after failing to recover from a shoulder injury. He was for many years before his retirement the oldest jockey in Britain, well liked by fellow jockeys, trainers, owners (perhaps excepting Peter Savill) and punters alike.

He is assistant trainer to his second wife Ann.

== Major wins ==
(United Kingdom) Great Britain

- Champion Stakes – (2) – Alborada (1998), Alborada (1999)
- Eclipse Stakes – (2) – Environment Friend (1991), Giant's Causeway (2000)
- Falmouth Stakes – Stumped (1980)
- King's Stand Stakes – Pivotal (1996)
- Lockinge Stakes – Noalcoholic (1983)
- Nassau Stakes – (2) – Last Second (1996), Alborada (1998)
- Nunthorpe Stakes – Pivotal (1996)
- Oaks Stakes – User Friendly (1992)
- St Leger Stakes – User Friendly (1992)
- Sun Chariot Stakes – Last Second (1996)
- Sussex Stakes – Noalcoholic (1983)
- Vertem Futurity Trophy – Aristotle (1999)
- Yorkshire Oaks – User Friendly (1992)

(Republic of Ireland) Ireland

- Flying Five Stakes – Danehurst (2002)
- Irish Oaks – User Friendly (1992)
- Matron Stakes – Iftiraas (2000)

France

- Grand Prix de Saint-Cloud – User Friendly (1993)

== See also ==
- List of jockeys
