= Terry Neill (racehorse owner) =

Terry Neill (born about 1941 in Liverpool) is a British racehorse owner and former Liverpool FC shareholder. He hails from the Queen's Drive area of Liverpool, but by 2001 was living at Chalfont St Giles in Buckinghamshire.

Neill left Bowaters to set up his own packaging and plastics business, exploited the new trend for own-branding by supermarkets and then sold out in 1995, when the annual turnover had reached £15m, to become a venture capitalist.

Neill has had racehorses in training with Martin Pipe, Michael Bell and Richard Hannon, Sr. His horse, Gloria Victis, was put down after running in the Tote Cheltenham Gold Cup at the 2000 Cheltenham Festival. Neill had gained his biggest win as an owner with his first-ever runner at the Festival, when Dark Stranger landed the Mildmay Of Flete Handicap Chase in the same year. Gloria Victis had previously given Neill another major win in the Racing Post Chase at Kempton in February of that year, despite being a novice carrying top weight.

Neill was first reported to be in preliminary discussions to buy a major slice of Liverpool FC, the club he watched as a boy, in 1999, in partnership with Jersey-based property tycoon Steve Morgan. By the following year, he was the fourth largest shareholder in the club. He owned 3 per cent of the club by the time of a takeover bid in 2007.
