= Red Ransom =

American-bred Thoroughbred racehorse

- Sire: Roberto
- Grandsire: Hail To Reason
- Dam: Arabia
- Damsire: Damascus
- Sex: Stallion
- Foaled: 1987
- Country: United States
- Colour: Bay
- Breeder: Paul Mellon
- Owner: Rokeby Stable
- Trainer: MacKenzie Miller
- Record: 3: 2-1-0
- Earnings: $34,400

Major wins
- Saratoga Racecourse Maiden Race (1989); Belmont Park Allowance Race (1989)

Red Ransom (foaled 1987 in Virginia, died 2009) is an American Thoroughbred racehorse. In his 2006 book Designing Speed in the Racehorse, author Ken McLean wrote that Red Ransom "was a sensationally fast juvenile."

Bred by Paul Mellon and raced under his Rokeby Stables banner, he was sired by the 1972 Epsom Derby winner, Roberto. His dam was Arabia, a daughter of U.S. Racing Hall of Fame inductee, Damascus.

Conditioned for racing by Hall of Fame trainer, MacKenzie Miller, on August 3, 1989 the two-year-old Red Ransom won his debut race while setting a new Saratoga Race Course record for five furlongs. He made his second start in early September at Belmont Park, scoring another win in a six furlong allowance race. However, the colt suffered an injury to a shin that kept him out of racing until early March 1990.

Considered a strong contender for the 1990 U.S. Triple Crown series, Red Ransom made his return with a second-place finish at Florida's Gulfstream Park. Six days later while training he suffered a torn tendon sheath that ended his racing career.

== As a sire ==
Retired to stud for the 1991 season, Red Ransom stood in the United States until 1999 when owner Paul Mellon died and he was sold to a breeding syndicate. The horse was sent to stand at stud in Australia and as at 2008 stands at Dalham Hall Stud in Newmarket, England.

During his stud career to date, Red Ransom has sired more than seventy stakes winners including:

- Casual Look - winner of the 2003 British Classic, The Oaks
- Electrocutionist - won three Group One races: Gran Premio di Milano (2005), Juddmonte International (2005) and Dubai World Cup (2006) with career earnings of £3,160,432
- Perfect Sting - winner of the 2000 Breeders' Cup Filly & Mare Turf
- Typhoon Tracy, won six group one (G1) races and Australian Racehorse of the Year for 2009/10.
- Red Clubs, European Champion Sprinter, sire of Sky Lantern

In addition, Red Ransom sired millionaires Charge Forward (Australia), Ekraar (England), plus two in Japan, Juno Pentagon and Roc de Cambes. He also sired a few unknown horses like King Raedwald and Somerset Falls. He died in 2009 after undergoing surgery.
