= Tolomeo (horse) =

Irish-bred Thoroughbred racehorse (1980– c. 2000)

- Sire: Lypheor
- Grandsire: Lyphard
- Dam: Almagest
- Damsire: Dike
- Sex: Stallion
- Foaled: 1980
- Country: Ireland
- Colour: Bay
- Breeder: Corduff Stud
- Owner: Carlo d'Alessio; P. Sykes
- Trainer: Luca Cumani
- Record: 17:2-6-2

Major wins
- Budweiser Million (1983); Timeform rating: 127
- Last updated on 4 October 2025

Tolomeo (1980 – circa 2000) was an Irish-bred, British-trained Thoroughbred racehorse and sire. He is best known for his upset victory in the 1983 Budweiser Million, when he became the first European horse to win the race and the first British-trained horse to win a major race in the United States for fourteen years. He was placed in many major races, including the 2000 Guineas, St. James's Palace Stakes, Eclipse Stakes, Sussex Stakes, Benson and Hedges Gold Cup, Champion Stakes and King George VI and Queen Elizabeth Stakes. After his retirement from racing he stood as a breeding stallion in Australia with moderate results.

== Background ==
Tolomeo was a big, powerful bay horse with a white star and three white socks bred in County Kildare, Ireland by the Corduff Stud. His sire Lypheor won the Prix Quincey in 1978 and showed great promise as a breeding stallion before his death at age of eleven: his other good winners included the inaugural Breeders' Cup Mile winner Royal Heroine and the Japanese champion Nippo Teio. Tolomeo was the first foal of his dam Almagest, whose only win came in a maiden at Leicester Racecourse.

As a yearling, Tolomeo was offered for sale and bought for 17,000 Irish guineas by representatives of the Italian lawyer Carlo d'Alessio. who named the colt after the astronomer Ptolemy. The colt was sent to be trained at Newmarket, Suffolk by Luca Cumani.

== Racing career ==
=== 1982: two-year-old season ===
Tolomeo ran three times as a two-year-old, finishing second in his first two attempts before recording his first win in a maiden race over seven furlongs at Newmarket Racecourse.

=== 1983: three-year-old season ===
After finishing fourth in the Craven Stakes on his debut as a three-year-old, Tolomeo contested the classic 2000 Guineas over Newmarket's Rowley mile course on 30 April. Ridden by the Italian jockey Gianfranco Dettori he started at odds of 18/1 against fifteen opponents. He was restrained in last place for most of the way before making rapid progress in the last quarter mile to finish second to the Irish-trained Lomond. Dettori was criticised for giving the colt too much ground to make up, but Cumani defended his jockey, insisting that he was riding according to instructions. Tolomeo next ran in the Derby over one and a half miles on soft ground, finishing ninth of the twenty-one runners, more than twenty lengths behind the winner Teenoso. Following this race, Tolomeo returned to shorter distances and produced three good performances without winning. He finished second by a head to Horage, to whom his jockey Greville Starkey had conceded a large advantage at the final turn, in the St James's Palace Stakes; he was third in a blanket finish for the Eclipse Stakes; and he came second to the five-year-old Noalcoholic in the Sussex Stakes.

In August, Tolomeo was one of four British-trained horses sent to Chicago for the third running of the Budweiser Million, which was then the most valuable horse race in the world. The American challenge was headed by the eight-year-old John Henry, supported by Majesty's Prince, Nijinsky's Secret and Erins Isle. Tolomeo was ridden by Irish jockey Pat Eddery and started at odds of 38/1 in a fourteen-runner field, although British bookmakers were much more cautious and made the colt the 5/1 second favourite. In a slowly run race, Eddery tracked the leaders John Henry and Nijinsky's Secret before making his challenge in the straight. When Nijinsky's Secret drifted to the right under pressure Tolomeo accelerated through a gap along the rail to take the lead and held of the late run of John Henry to win by a neck. Tolomeo's success was the first for a British-trained horse in a major American race since Karabas won the Washington, D.C. International in 1969. His win also made him the second biggest money-earner in British racing history behind the 1979 Derby winner Troy.

On his return to Europe, Tolomeo ended his season with a run in the Champion Stakes at Newmarket in October. In a race which was run in a very strong side-wind, he finished second to the filly Cormorant Wood but was relegated to fourth for causing interference in the closing stages.

=== 1984: four-year-old season ===
As a four-year-old, Tolomeo continued to produce good performances but was less consistent and Timeform commented that he appeared to have become "something of a character". On his first appearance of the year he finished fourth when carrying top weight in the Prince of Wales's Stakes (then a Group Two race) and then finished seventh behind Sadler's Wells in the Eclipse Stakes. In July he was moved up in distance to one and a half miles for the King George VI and Queen Elizabeth Stakes at Ascot. Ridden by his regular work-rider Rae Guest, Tolomeo produced one of his best efforts as he finished third behind Teenoso and Sadler's Wells. In August he finished second in the Benson and Hedges Gold Cup at York, beaten two and a half lengths by Cormorant Wood. His form declined in the autumn and he finished unplaced in the Phoenix Champion Stakes and the Champion Stakes.

== Assessment ==
In the official International Classification for 1983, Tolomeo was given a rating of 87, making him the fifth-best three-year-old colt in Europe behind Shareef Dancer, Caerleon, L'Emigrant and Teenoso. He was rated on 87 again in the following season, making him the fourth best older male behind Teenoso, Sagace and Morcon. The independent Timeform organisation gave him a rating of 127 in both years.

== Stud record ==
At the end of his racing career, Tolomeo was sold to a syndicate of Australian breeders. He stood for one season at the British National Stud before being exported to the Goree Stud in New South Wales in 1985. He later stood as a breeding stallion in Japan. The best of his offspring were probably Innocent King, a gelding who won the Rosehill Guineas and the Australian Derby in 1993 and Daiwa Texas, who won two Group Two races and finished third in the Arima Kinen. His popularity waned in the 1990s and in 1999, his last year at stud, he sired only one foal.

== Pedigree ==
Pedigree of Tolomeo (IRE), bay colt, 1980
Sire Lypheor (GB) 1975	Lyphard (USA); 1969	Northern Dancer	Nearctic
Sire Lypheor (GB) 1975	Lyphard (USA); 1969	Northern Dancer	Natalma
Sire Lypheor (GB) 1975	Lyphard (USA); 1969	Goofed	Court Martial
Sire Lypheor (GB) 1975	Lyphard (USA); 1969	Goofed	Barra
Sire Lypheor (GB) 1975	Klaizia (FR); 1965	Sing Sing	Tudor Minstrel
Sire Lypheor (GB) 1975	Klaizia (FR); 1965	Sing Sing	Agin the Law
Sire Lypheor (GB) 1975	Klaizia (FR); 1965	Klainia	Klairon
Sire Lypheor (GB) 1975	Klaizia (FR); 1965	Klainia	Kalitka
Dam Almagest (GB) 1975	Dike (USA); 1966	Herbager	Vandale
Dam Almagest (GB) 1975	Dike (USA); 1966	Herbager	Flagette
Dam Almagest (GB) 1975	Dike (USA); 1966	Delta	Nasrullah
Dam Almagest (GB) 1975	Dike (USA); 1966	Delta	Bourtai
Dam Almagest (GB) 1975	Celestial Sun (GB); 1965	Sunny Way	Honeyway
Dam Almagest (GB) 1975	Celestial Sun (GB); 1965	Sunny Way	Red Sunset
Dam Almagest (GB) 1975	Celestial Sun (GB); 1965	Heavenly Story	Nimbus (GB)
Dam Almagest (GB) 1975	Celestial Sun (GB); 1965	Heavenly Story	Kings Story (Family: 13-a)
