= Accidental Agent =

British-bred Thoroughbred racehorse

- Racing silks of Gaie Johnson Houghton
- Sire: Delegator
- Grandsire: Dansili
- Dam: Roodle
- Damsire: Xaar
- Sex: Gelding
- Foaled: 8 April 2014
- Country: United Kingdom
- Colour: Bay
- Breeder: Gaie Johnson Houghton
- Owner: Gaie Johnson Houghton
- Trainer: Eve Johnson Houghton
- Record: 53: 7-5-5
- Earnings: £753,996

Major wins
- Queen Anne Stakes (2018)

Accidental Agent, (foaled 8 April 2014) is a British Thoroughbred racehorse best known for his upset victory in the 2018 Queen Anne Stakes. He showed promise when winning twice as a juvenile in 2016 and developed into a high-class handicapper in the following year. In 2018, he defeated a strong international field to take the Queen Anne Stakes at Royal Ascot at odds of 33/1. He failed to win in nine races as a five-year-old.

== Background ==
Accidental Agent is a bay gelding bred and owned by Gaie Johnson Houghton and trained by his owner's daughter Eve Johnson Houghton at Blewbury in Oxfordshire. He was named after John Goldsmith, Gaie Johnson Houghton's father. Goldsmith was a racehorse trainer and Special Operations Executive agent who wrote a book about his wartime experiences titled The Accidental Agent. As a yearling Accidental Agent was offered for sale at Tattersalls but was bought back by his owner when he failed to reach his reserve price. Eve Johnson Houghton later commented "He went through the sales ring and nobody even looked at him". The horse has been ridden in most of his races by Charles Bishop.

He was probably the best horse sired by Delegator, a top-class sprinter-miler who finished second in the 2000 Guineas and won the Duke of York Stakes. Accidental Agent's dam Roodle showed modest ability on the track, winning two minor races for the Johnson Houghtons from 16 attempts. She was distantly descended in the female line from Satanella (foaled 1941) a British broodmare whose descendants have included Chief Singer, Pleasantly Perfect and Winged Love.

== Racing career ==
=== 2016: two-year-old season ===
Accidental Agent began his racing career in a maiden race over seven furlongs at Sandown Park on 13 July in which he started at odds of 7/1 and finished sixth of the sixteen runners. Eighteen days later at Chepstow Racecourse he started at odds of 9/2 for a similar event and recorded his first success, as he took the lead approaching the final furlong and won by one and three quarter lengths from Highland Lotus. The colt then carried 132 pounds in a nursery handicap at Goodwood Racecourse on 26 August in which he led for most of the way before being beaten a length into second place by Procurator. On 1 October at Newmarket Racecourse he was dropped back to six furlongs and went off at 14/1 for the Tattersalls October Auction Stakes, a valuable handicap race for juveniles offered for sale at Tatteralls as yearlings. The 26 runner field split into two groups, with Accidental Agent racing towards the rear of the group on the near side (the left side from the jockeys' viewpoint). He made rapid progress approaching the final furlong, took the lead in the closing stages and kept on strongly to win by a length from the filly Simmie.

=== 2017: three-year-old season ===
On his first appearance of 2017 Accidental Agent ran fifth in a six furlong handicap at Doncaster Racecourse on 28 April and then finished seventh in a similar event over seven furlongs at Ascot Racecourse two weeks later. On 9 September the colt returned from a lengthy break in a seven furlong handicap on the synthetic polytrack surface at Kempton Park Racecourse and recorded his first success of the season, taking the lead in the final furlong and winning by one and three quarter lengths from Leontes. Later that month he was stepped up to Listed class for the Dubai Duty Free Cup over seven furlongs at Newbury Racecourse in which he started a 16/1 outsider and finished strongly to take second place, a neck behind the four-year-old Tabarrak. On 7 October Accidental Agent carried 129 pounds in a valuable seven furlong handicap at Ascot and went off at 16/1 in an 18-runner field. After being restrained towards the rear by Bishop in the early stages he took the lead inside the final furlong and held off the late challenge of the four-year-old Lord Glitters to win by half a length. Two weeks later he came home fourth behind Lord Glitters in the one-mile Balmoral Handicap at the same track when attempting to concede five pounds to his older rival. On his final appearance of the year he started favourite for the Listed Hyde Stakes at Kempton in November but ran poorly and finished unplaced.

=== 2018: four-year-old season ===
Accidental Agent commenced his third campaign in the Listed Paradise Stakes over one mile at Ascot on 2 May and started the 2/1 favourite against six opponents. He raced towards the rear for most of the way, and although he made some progress in the last quarter mile he never looked likely to win and finished third behind Century Dream and Crazy Horse. Seventeen days later at Newbury the colt contested his first Group race when he started the 66/1 outsider of the fourteen runners for the Group 1 Lockinge Stakes. He exceeded expectations as he kept on in the closing stages to take sixth place behind Rhododendron.

On 19 June on good to firm ground at Royal Ascot Accidental Agent went off at odds of 33/1 for the Queen Anne Stakes. Benbatl started favourite, while the other thirteen runners included Rhododendron, Century Dream, Lord Glitters, Lightning Spear, Limato, Recoletos (Prix d'Ispahan), Yoshida (Turf Classic Stakes), Deauville (Belmont Derby) and Suedois (Shadwell Turf Mile Stakes). After racing towards the rear as Deauville set the pace, Accidental Agent began to make progress in the last quarter mile and joined the leaders in the final furlong. He gained the advantage in the closing stages and won by half a length from Lord Glitters with Lightning Spear, Century Dream, Yoshida and Beat The Bank finishing close behind. After the race Eve Johnson Houghton said "I thought I was tilting at windmills and I dreamt about being third. I thought, 'My God, I'm going to be placed.' There was an awful lot of screaming going on! It's just ridiculous. I have all my cousins and brothers and my mum here; I don't think she's ever going to get over it. He was bred by mum. My mum is the little woman in a flood of tears. What a legend she is. I am so proud of her and I had a little bit on at 50/1 to pay for the party."

In August Accidental Agent was sent to France to contest the Prix Jacques Le Marois over 1600 metres at Deauville Racecourse but never recovered from a poor start and came home eleventh of the twelve runners in a race won by Alpha Centauri. His final race of the season saw the horse dropped back to Group 2 class for the Joel Stakes at Newmarket on 22 September. He started slowly again and finished last of the five runners.

In the 2018 World's Best Racehorse Rankings Accidental Agent was given a rating of 116 making him the 163rd best racehorse in the world.

=== 2019: five-year-old season ===
Accidental Agent began his five-year-old season at Newbury on 18 May when he made a second attempt to win the Lockinge Stakes. He started a 33/1 outsider but ran better than his odds suggested as he stayed on well from the rear of the field to take third place behind Mustashry and Laurens. On 19 June he returned to Royal Ascot to attempt to win the Queen Anne Stakes for a second time but took no part in the race after refusing to start when the stalls opened. The horse finished last of eight behind Too Darn Hot in the Sussex Stakes at Goodwood and was then dropped in class for the Group 3 Sovereign Stakes at Salisbury Racecourse on 15 August in which he was beaten a nose by the three-year-old Kick On after struggling to obtain a clear run in the last quarter mile. Nine days later he ran third in the Winter Hill Stakes at Windsor after which he underwent an operation to correct a breathing problem. Accidental Agent returned to the track on 19 October when he came home eleventh of the twelve runners behind King of Change in the Queen Elizabeth II Stakes at Ascot. In November he was dropped back to Listed class but failed to recover his best form as he finished third in both the Ben Marshall Stakes at Newmarket and the Hyde Stakes at Kempton. In December he was gelded.

=== 2020: six-year-old season ===
The 2020 flat racing season in England and Ireland was disrupted by the COVID-19 pandemic and Accidental Agent did not make his reappearance until 16 June when he contested his third Queen Anne Stakes and ran rather better that his 100/1 odds indicated as he finished fifth behind Circus Maximus. Twelve days later he ran fourth behind Pogo in the Listed Midsummer Stakes at Windsor. In his two subsequent races in 2020 he finished fifth in the Sovereign Stakes and ran unplaced in a seven furlong handicap at Newmarket on 5 September.

== Pedigree ==
Pedigree of Accidental Agent (GB), bay colt 2014
Sire Delegator (GB) 2006	Dansili; 1996	Danehill (USA)	Danzig
Sire Delegator (GB) 2006	Dansili; 1996	Danehill (USA)	Razyana
Sire Delegator (GB) 2006	Dansili; 1996	Hasili (IRE)	Kahyasi
Sire Delegator (GB) 2006	Dansili; 1996	Hasili (IRE)	Kerali (GB)
Sire Delegator (GB) 2006	Indian Love Bird; 1999	Efisio	Formidable (USA)
Sire Delegator (GB) 2006	Indian Love Bird; 1999	Efisio	Eldoret (IRE)
Sire Delegator (GB) 2006	Indian Love Bird; 1999	Indian Love Song (IRE)	Be My Guest (USA)
Sire Delegator (GB) 2006	Indian Love Bird; 1999	Indian Love Song (IRE)	Indian Bird (GB)
Dam Roodle (GB) 2007	Xaar; 1995	Zafonic (USA)	Gone West
Dam Roodle (GB) 2007	Xaar; 1995	Zafonic (USA)	Zaizafon
Dam Roodle (GB) 2007	Xaar; 1995	Monroe (USA)	Sir Ivor
Dam Roodle (GB) 2007	Xaar; 1995	Monroe (USA)	Best In Show
Dam Roodle (GB) 2007	Roodeye; 2002	Inchinor	Ahonoora
Dam Roodle (GB) 2007	Roodeye; 2002	Inchinor	Inchmurrin (IRE)
Dam Roodle (GB) 2007	Roodeye; 2002	Roo	Rudimentary (USA)
Dam Roodle (GB) 2007	Roodeye; 2002	Roo	Shall We Run (Family 16-a)
