= Whitsun Cup =

Flat horse race in Britain

- Class: Handicap
- Location: Sandown Park; Esher, England
- Race type: Flat / Thoroughbred
- Sponsor: Horse Kick Cider
- Website: Sandown Park

Race information
- Distance: 1m (1,609m)
- Surface: Turf
- Track: Right-handed
- Qualification: Four-years-old and up
- Weight: Handicap
- Purse: £17,500 (2024); 1st: £9,020

Whitsun Cup Handicap
2019
| Lush Life | War Glory | History Writer |

Previous years
2018
Chiefofchiefs | Kynren | Mountain Angel
2017
Laidback Romeo | Greenside | Sir Roderic
2016
Chevallier | Jailawi | Secret Art
2015
Jacob Black | Secret Art | Tigers Tale
2014
Ishikawa | Dream Walker | George Cinq
2013
Spa's Dancer | Shamaal Nibras | Gaul Wood
2012
Highland Colori | Directorship | Weapon Of Choice
2011
Dunn'o | Leviathan | Julienas

2010-2003
2010
Flora Trevelyan | Ithinkbest | Dunn'o
2009
Dunn'o | Axiom | Kavachi
2008
Bushman | Little White Lie | Zero Cool
2007
Killena Boy | Queen's Best | Presumptive
2006
Tanzanite | Spectait | Audience
2005
Norton | Momtic | Ace of Hearts
2004
Putra Kuantan | Impeller | Finished Article
2003
Colisay | Duke Of Modena | Surprise Encounter

The Whitsun Cup is a flat handicap horse race in Great Britain open to horses aged four years or older. It is run at Sandown Park over a distance of 1 mile (1,609 metres), and it is scheduled to take place each year at the end of May.

== Winners ==
| Year | Winner | Age | Weight | Jockey | Trainer | Time |
|---|---|---|---|---|---|---|
| 1963 | Tiger | 3 | 9-06 | Scobie Breasley | Sir Gordon Richards | 1:45.20 |
| 1964 | Red Slipper | 4 | 9-07 | Bill Williamson | Sir Hugh Nugent | 1:46.60 |
| 1965 | Christmas Review | 4 | 7-11 | Des Cullen | Ken Cundell | 1:41.40 |
| 1966 | Aberdeen | 5 | 8-08 | Bruce Raymond | Humphrey Cottrill | 1:42.60 |
| 1967 | Morris Dancer | 6 | 8-04 | Geoff Lewis | Ian Balding | 1:46.00 |
| 1968 | Cumshaw | 7 | 8-03 | Bill Williamson | John Benstead | 1:45.20 |
| 1969 | Ward Drill | 7 | 9-00 | Geoff Lewis | Cyril Mitchell | 1:46.60 |
| 1970 | Seventh Hussar | 4 | 8-06 | Tony Murray | Ryan Price | 1:41.80 |
| 1971 | Jolisu | 4 | 8-02 | Ron Hutchinson | Tommy Gosling | 1:45.40 |
| 1972 | Dancing Mood | 6 | 8-00 | Ron Hutchinson | Herbert Blagrave | 1:45.20 |
| 1973 (Note: The 1973 race was run at Kempton Park) | Buss | 4 | 8-03 | Geoff Lewis | Arthur Budgett | 1:51.61 |
| 1974 | Rascolnik | 5 | 8-04 | John Matthias | Herbert Blagrave | 1:41.05 |
| 1975 | Deerslayer | 4 | 9-03 | Frankie Durr | Henry Cecil | 1:42.30 |
| 1976 | Rhodomantade | 5 | 9-04 | Lester Piggott | Peter Makin | 1:41.47 |
| 1977 | The Nadi Royale | 6 | 8-08 | Brian Rouse | John Sutcliffe | 1:44.09 |
| 1978 | Elland Road | 4 | 08-11 | Lester Piggott | Robert Armstrong | 1:42.55 |
| 1979 | Brians Venture | 4 | 10-00 | Lester Piggott | Richard Hannon Sr. | 1:47.89 |
| 1980 | Imperial Ace | 4 | 8-07 | Lester Piggott | Michael Stoute | 1:41.73 |
| 1981 | Abandoned due to waterlogging |
| 1982 | Rekal | 4 | 8-02 | Geoff Baxter | Clive Brittain | 1:39.81 |
| 1983 | Mighty Fly | 4 | 9-01 | Steve Cauthen | David Elsworth | 1:45.86 |
| 1984 | Hawkley | 4 | 8-06 | Tyrone Williams | Pat Haslam | 1:45.49 |
| 1985 | Come On The Blues | 6 | 7-07 | Chris Rutter | Clive Brittain | 1:46.52 |
| 1986 | Siyah Kalem | 4 | 8-10 | Willie Carson | John Dunlop | 1:42.85 |
| 1987 | Waajib | 4 | 9-09 | Michael Roberts | Alec Stewart | 1:40.92 |
| 1988 | Inaad | 4 | 8-02 | Richard Hills | Harry Thomson Jones | 1:42.40 |
| 1989 | Greensmith | 3 | 9-02 | Pat Eddery | Guy Harwood | 1:41.66 |
| 1990 | Tafila | 4 | 8-07 | Willie Carson | William Jarvis | 1:42.02 |
| 1991 | Fanmore | 3 | 9-07 | Pat Eddery | Guy Harwood | 1:42.00 |
| 1992 | Pay Homage | 4 | 9-04 | Michael Hills | Ian Balding | 1:41.41 |
| 1993 | Pay Homage | 5 | 9-05 | Michael Hills | Ian Balding | 1:41.42 |
| 1994 | Dawning Street | 6 | 8-12 | Pat Eddery | John Dunlop | 1:43.42 |
| 1995 | Dance Turn | 4 | 8-08 | Michael Hills | Robert Armstrong | 1:42.36 |
| 1996 | Blomberg | 4 | 9-01 | John Carroll | James Fanshawe | 1:44.36 |
| 1997 | Insatiable | 4 | 9-04 | Michael Kinane | Michael Stoute | 1:40.21 |
| 1998 | For Your Eyes Only | 4 | 9-00 | Jason Weaver | Tim Easterby | 1:42.20 |
| 1999 | Lonesome Dude | 4 | 9-04 | Gérald Mossé | Michael Stoute | 1:41.70 |
| 2000 | Swallow Flight | 4 | 9-11 | Michael Roberts | Geoff Wragg | 1:49.35 |
| 2001 | Calcutta | 5 | 8-08 | Michael Hills | Barry Hills | 1:43.92 |
| 2002 | Kelburne | 5 | 9-00 | Richard Hughes | Ian Semple | 1:43.02 |
| 2003 | Colisay | 4 | 9-03 | Kieren Fallon | Alec Stewart | 1:41.66 |
| 2004 | Putra Kuantan | 4 | 9-03 | Philip Robinson | Michael Jarvis | 1:41.99 |
| 2005 | Norton | 8 | 8-08 | Richard Quinn | Terry Mills | 1:42.39 |
| 2006 | Tanzanite | 4 | 8-13 | Kerrin McEvoy | David Arbuthnot | 1:45.69 |
| 2007 | Killena Boy | 5 | 8-08 | Paul Doe | William Jarvis | 1:45.25 |
| 2008 | Bushman | 4 | 9-02 | Richard Mullen | David Simcock | 1:47.37 |
| 2009 | Dunn'o | 4 | 9-01 | Philip Robinson | Clive Cox | 1:41.31 |
| 2010 | Flora Trevelyan | 4 | 8-10 | Ted Durcan | Walter Swinburn | 1:40.84 |
| 2011 | Dunn'o | 6 | 9-07 | Philip Robinson | Clive Cox | 1:44.26 |
| 2012 | Highland Colori | 4 | 8-13 | David Probert | Andrew Balding | 1:42.55 |
| 2013 | Spa's Dancer | 6 | 9-04 | Ryan Moore | James Eustace | 1:44.76 |
| 2014 | Ishikawa | 6 | 8-07 | Rob Fitzpatrick | Karl Burke | 1:46.52 |
| 2015 | Jacob Black | 4 | 9-02 | Frankie Dettori | Keith Dalgleish | 1:40.73 |
| 2016 | Chevallier | 4 | 8-02 | Jordan Vaughan | Karl Burke | 1:41.52 |
| 2017 | Laidback Romeo | 5 | 9-04 | Adam Kirby | Clive Cox | 1:42.57 |
| 2018 | Chiefofchiefs | 5 | 8-12 | Richard Kingscote | Charlie Fellows | 1:47.47 |
| 2019 | Lush Life | 4 | 9-04 | Jamie Spencer | Jamie Osborne | 1:42.21 |
| | no race 2020 (Note: The 2020 running was cancelled because of the COVID-19 pandemic in the United Kingdom) |
| 2021 | Dashing Roger | 4 | 9-03 | Marco Ghiani | William Stone | 1:46.51 |
| 2022 | Rebel Territory | 4 | 9-09 | Jim Crowley | Amanda Perrett | 1:42.76 |
| 2023 | Indemnity | 4 | 9-01 | Ray Dawson | Roger Varian | 1:42.78 |
| 2024 | Dual Identity | 6 | 9-07 | Neil Callan | William Knight | 1:45.67 |
| 2025 | Hafeet Alain | 9 | 9-04 | Jack Doughty | Ed Walker | 1:43.47 |
| 2026 | Boyfriend | 5 | 9-00 | Pat Dobbs | Richard Hannon Jr. | 1:41.63 |

== See also ==
- Horse racing in Great Britain
- List of British flat horse races
