= Newbury Spring Cup =

Flat horse race in Britain

Newbury Spring Cup
2026
Linwood	Classic	Whip Cracker

Previous years
2025
Ebt's Guard	Urban Lion	Classic
2024
Metal Merchant	Godwinson	Talis Evolvere
2023
Jimi Hendrix	Lattam	Revich
2022
Modern News	Migration	Rogue Bear
2021
Nugget	Danyah	Matthew Flinders

2020-2011
2019
Chatez	Indeed	Borodin
2018
Taqdeer	Humbert	Keyser Soze
2017
Banksea	Another Touch	Fastnet Tempest
2016
Gabrial's Kaka	Azraff	Earth Drummer
2015
Ayaar	Spark Plug	Big Baz
2014
Gabrial's Kaka	Spa's Dancer	Brownsea Brink
2013
Haaf A Sixpence	Guest of Honour	Chapter Seven
2012
Captain Bertie	Fury	Global Village
2011
Light From Mars	Pintura	Lowther

2010-2001
2010
Brunston	Marajaa	Oratory
2009
Extraterrestrial	Arabian Spirit	Medici Pearl
2008
Lang Shining	Benandonner	Zaahid
2007
Pinpoint	Royal Oath	Heaven Sent
2006
Forgery	Colisay	Red Spell
2005
Fine Silver	Common World	Resplendent One
2004
El Coto	Serieux	King's County
2003
Mystic Man	Faithful Warrior	Golden Chalice
2002
The Judge	Kareeb	Norton
2001
Mastermind	Pulau Tioman	Vintage Premium

2000-1991
1999
Bomb Alaska	Topatori	Radar
1998
Yabint El Sultan	Kennemara Star	Therhea
1997
Hawksley Hill	Lonely Leader	Saifan
1996
Royal Philosopher	Cool Edge	Cadeaux Tryst
1995
Star Manager	Jawaal	Gadge
1994
Missed Flight	Just You Dare	Beauchamp Hero
1993
Tissisat	Risk Master	Royal Seaton
1992
Rudimentary	Roseate Lodge	Sharp N' Smooth
1991
St Ninian	Roseate Lodge	State Dancer

1990-1988
1990
Wassl Port	Nayland	Breezed Well
1989
Ottergayle	Beau Sher	Joveworth
1988
El Rey	Just A Flutter	Colway Rally

The Newbury Spring Cup is a flat handicap horse race in Great Britain open to horses aged four years or older. It is run at Newbury over a distance of 1 mile (1,609 metres), and it is scheduled to take place each year in April.

== Winners ==
Year	Winner	Age	Weight	Jockey	Trainer	Time
1906	Succory	3	06-05	Joseph Plant	P Lowe
1907	Dalkeith	Aged	07-12	William Griggs	Farquharson
1908	Roseate Dawn	7	07-13	Skeets Martin	Frank Hartigan	1:48.80
1909	Arranmore	4	06-04	Frank Wootton	Charles Peck	1:47.00
1910	Valens	4	09-00	William Saxby	Richard Dawson	1:45.20
1911	Rochester	4	08-02	Jim Clark	Percy Peck
1912	Long Set	5	09-00	Billy Higgs	J H Batho	1:40.00
1913	Aldegond	3	06-08	Joseph Plant	James Bell	1:47.80
1914	Wrack	5	07-11	Albert Whalley	Frank Hartigan	1:47.80
1915	Wrack	6	08-12	Fred Rickaby Jr.	Frank Hartigan
1916	Cerval	5	07-07	Dick	F Hunt	1:37.00
1917–18	No race
1919	Callander	4	08-06	Bernard Carslake	George Lambton	1:49.60
1920	Grandcourt	4	07-05	Arthur Balding	Farquharson
1921	Abandoned due to a National Coal Strike
1922	Abandoned due to snow
1923	Royal Alarm	6	08-04	Bernard Carslake	Atty Persse	1:54.00
1924	Condover	5	08-08	Harry Beasley Jr.	Harper	1:49.00
1925	Paddy	4	07-08	Frank Dempsey	James Bell	1:47.60
1926	Rock Fire	7	06-06	Pat Donoghue	Hackett	1:42.00
1927	Orbindos	4	06-11	Archie Burns	Ted Gwilt	1:46.40
1928	Vantage Belle	5	07-02	Archie Burns	P Lowe	1:46.00
1929	Athford	4	07-06	Freddie Fox	Richard Dawson	1:40.40
1930	Osiris	4	08-02	Charlie Elliott	Basil Jarvis	1:42.20
1931	Masher	4	09-03	Bernard Carslake	Ted Gwilt	1:42.80
1932	Abbots Worthy	4	07-13	Sir Gordon Richards	Frank Hartigan	1:49.00
1933	Limelight	4	09-05	Joe Childs	William Jarvis	1:41.40
1934	Young Native	5	08-00	Cliff Richards	Rickards	1:45.60
1935	Canteener	5	07-12	Steve Donoghue	Len Cundell	1:42.60
1936	Finalist	4	09-02	Harry Wragg	Ossie Bell	1:50.00
1937	Remember II	4	07-02	Kenneth Robertson	Fred Butters	1:50.80
1938	Carlisle	4	07-12	Harry Sprague	George Lambton	1:43.20
1939	Caerloptic	4	08-13	Richardson	Harry Cottrill	1:41.40
1940	Meadow	4	08-04	Michael Beary	Joseph Lawson	1:42.00
1941–48	No race
1949	Coalition	4	08-05	Davy Jones	G Wilson	2:07.80
1950	Grani	4	08-01	Frank Barlow	Michael Blackmore	2:09.80
1951	Abandoned due to waterlogging
1952	Polar Jest	5	07-02	Joe Mercer	Herbert Smyth Jr.	1:38.20
1953	Prince D'Or	4	08-05	Scobie Breasley	Derrick Candy	1:39.80
1954	Desert Way	4	07-07	Jock Wilson	Jack Reardon	1:39.60
1955	Immortal	4	07-00	Peter Robinson	Harry Wragg	1:40.40
1956	Casmiri	4	07-13	Eddie Cracknell	Alfred Smyth	1:44.60
1957	Orthopaedic	6	08-05	Joe Mercer	Towser Gosden	1:40.00
1958	Nicholas Nickleby	7	08-02	Joe Mercer	William O'Gorman	1:39.40
1959	Precious Heather	7	07-07	Johnny Limb	Towser Gosden	1:50.80
1960	Line Shooter	6	07-01	Derrick Greening	Bernard van Cutsem	1:44.00
1961	Zanzibar	6	09-04	Eph Smith	John Oxley	1:43.80
1962	Pardoner	5	08-08	Bill Rickaby	John Waugh	1:43.00
1963	Owl	4	08-03	Geoff Lewis	Peter Hastings-Bass	1:50.60
1964	March Wonder	4	07-11	Sammy Millbanks	Vernon Cross	1:44.20
1965	Scots Fusilier	6	07-10	Jock Wilson	Atty Corbett	1:47.60
1966	Abandoned due to snow
1967	Last Case (Note: Shady Knight finished first, but after a steward's enquiry was disqualified and placed second.)	4	09-05	Scobie Breasley	Peter Nelson	1:38.60
1968	Owen Anthony	4	07-13	Sandy Barclay	Doug Smith	1:42.80
1969	Emerilo	5	08-07	Lester Piggott	Dave Hanley	1:27.60
1970	Night Of Gladness	4	07-07	Tommy Carter	Brian Swift	1:51.00
1971	Ouda	4	08-01	Frankie Durr	Peter Walwyn	1:40.84
1972	Mon Plaisir	5	10-00	Geoff Lewis	Harold Wallington	1:47.90
1973	Mon Plaisir	6	10-00	Joe Mercer	Harold Wallington	1:40.51
1974	Coup De Feu	5	9-11	Lester Piggott	Duncan Sasse	1:39.36
1975	Charlie Bubbles	4	09-02	Pat Eddery	Peter Walwyn	1:52.51
1976	Ardoon	6	09-07	Brian Taylor	Gavin Pritchard-Gordon	1:36.61
1977	Air Trooper	4	07-11	Taffy Thomas	Bill Wightman	1:40.06
1978	Yamadori	6	8-07	Lester Piggott	Fulke Johnson Houghton	1:45.58
1979	Brians Venture	4	09-04	Pat Eddery	Richard Hannon Sr.	1:41.20
1980	Northleach	5	07-12	Willie Carson	John Dunlop	1:37.42
1981	Belmont Bay	4	10-00	Lester Piggott	Henry Cecil	1:43.87
1982	Molon Lave	5	08-03	Paul Bradwell	Clive Brittain	1:38.35
1983	Morality Stone	6	07-08	Bryn Crossley	Philip Mitchell	1:41.48
1984	Joyful Dancer	4	07-11	Richard Quinn	Paul Cole	1:37.57
1985	Go Banana's	4	08-02	Ray Cochrane	Ken Ivory	1:41.47
1986	Star Of A Gunner	6	08-00	Steve Dawson	Richard Holder	1:47.48
1987	Abutammam	4	08-02	Brian Rouse	John Benstead	1:53.74
1988	El Rey	4	08-00	Dale Gibson	William Hastings-Bass	1:40.48
1989	Ottergayle	4	08-11	Pat Eddery	Peter Walwyn	1:42.18
1990	Wassl Port	4	08-11	Michael Hills	Barry Hills	1:40.48
1991	St Ninian	5	09-02	Lester Piggott	Peter Easterby	1:38.91
1992	Rudimentary	4	10-00	Pat Eddery	Henry Cecil	1:43.27
1993	Tissisat	4	09-01	Frankie Dettori	Ian Balding	1:43.29
1994	Missed Flight	4	09-10	George Duffield	Chris Wall	1:45.03
1995	Star Manager	5	08-05	Richard Quinn	Paul Cole	1:37.11
1996	Royal Philosopher	4	08-13	Michael Hills	John Hills	1:39.51
1997	Hawksley Hill	4	09-06	Jimmy Fortune	Lynda Ramsden	1:40.48
1998	Yabint El Sultan	4	08-12	Ray Cochrane	Bryan McMahon	1:46.79
1999	Bomb Alaska	4	08-11	J F Egan	Toby Balding	1:36.98
2000	Abandoned due to waterlogging
2001	Mastermind	4	09-11	Robert Winston	Lynda Ramsden	1:43.93
2002	The Judge	4	08-06	Ian Mongan	Paul Cole	1:38.61
2003	Mystic Man	5	08-07	P Fessey	Kevin Ryan	1:36.74
2004	El Coto	4	09-03	Seb Sanders	Bryan McMahon	1:40.99
2005	Fine Silver	4	09-06	Frankie Dettori	Paul Cole	1:44.68
2006	Forgery	4	08-06	Nicky Mackay	Gerard Butler	1:37.35
2007	Pinpoint	5	09-08	Adam Kirby	Walter Swinburn	1:36.92
2008	Lang Shining	4	08-11	Ryan Moore	Sir Michael Stoute	1:41.48
2009	Extraterrestrial	5	09-03	Frederik Tylicki	Richard Fahey	1:42.01
2010	Brunston	4	08-02	Hayley Turner	Roger Charlton	1:36.98
2011	Light From Mars	6	09-07	Mickael Barzalona	David Nicholls	1:36.98
2012	Captain Bertie	4	08-07	William Carson	Charles Hills	1:45.79
2013	Haaf A Sixpence	4	08-03	Andrea Atzeni	Ralph Beckett	1:37.74
2014	Gabrial's Kaka	4	08-12	Jamie Spencer	Richard Fahey	1:42.17
2015	Ayaar	5	08-09	Frankie Dettori	Luca Cumani	1:34.41
2016 (Note: The 2016 running took place at Chelmsford City)	Gabrial's Kaka	6	08-10	Paul Hanagan	Richard Fahey	1:38.45
2017	Banksea	4	09-04	Jamie Spencer	Luca Cumani	1:36.93
2018	Taqdeer	5	09-01	Frankie Dettori	John Gosden	1:40.88
2019	Chatez	8	09-01	William Buick	Alan King	1:41.31
	no race 2020 (Note: The 2020 running was cancelled because of the COVID-19 pandemic in the United Kingdom)
2021	Nugget	4	08-09	Ryan Moore	Richard Hannon Jr.	1:37.14
2022	Modern News	4	09-09	William Buick	Charlie Appleby	1:36.74
2023	Jimi Hendrix	4	09-01	Rossa Ryan	Ralph Beckett	1:46.17
2024	Metal Merchant	4	08–10	David Probert	Jack Channon	1:37.76
2025	Ebt's Guard	4	09-06	Lewis Edmunds	William Muir & Chris Grassick	1:37.45
2026	Linwood	4	09-12	Jamie Spencer	Richard Hannon Jr.	1:38.70

== See also ==
- Horse racing in Great Britain
- List of British flat horse races
