= Silver Bowl (horse race) =

Flat horse race in Britain

Silver Bowl Stakes
2025
| Teroomm | Tilted Kilt | Afentiko |

Previous years
2024
Nellie Leylax | Involvement | Apiarist
2023
Covey | Royal Cape | Metal Merchant
2022
Whoputfiftyinyou | Mighty Ulysses | Outgate
2021
Raadobarg | Seasett | Teodolina

2020-2011
2019
Beatboxer | Munhamek | Victory Command
2018
Crack On Crack On | Completion | Crownthorpe
2017
Rusumaat | Indian Dandy | Masham Star
2016
Garcia | Chief Whip | Above N Beyond
2015
Mutarakez | Goring | Carry On Deryck
2014
Chatez | Zarwaan | First Flight
2013
Shebebi | Newstead Abbey | Mocenigo
2012
Gabrial | Lucky Henry | Switzerland
2011
Sagramor | King Of Jazz | Winter's Night

2010-2001
2010
Balducci | Al Farahidi | Black Snowflake
2009
Desert Creek | Set The Trend | Derbaas
2008
Staying On | Commander Cave | Jaser
2007
Tobosa | Annemasse | Billy Dane
2006
Anna Pavlova | Sir Gerard | Kalankari
2005
Home Affairs | Notability | Enforcer
2004
Gatwick | Makfool | Zonus
2003
Jazz Messenger | Soyuz | Band
2002
Common World | Macaw | Tahitian Storm
2001
Olympic Express | Lord Protector | Gilded Dancer

2000-1991
2000
Atlantic Rhapsody | Vintage Premium | Material Witness
1999
Date | Riverblue | Swallow Flight
1998
French Connection | Lucayan Indian | Tom Dougal
1997
Alezal | Future Perfect | Caviar Royale
1996
Winter Romance | Jo Mell | Believe Me
1995
Sonic Boy | Sue's Return | Crumpton Hill
1994
Dance Turn | Fawran | Knave's Ash
1993
Moorish | Coneybury | Key To My Heart
1992
Sharpitor | Big Blue | Modernise
1991
Takaddum | Take Two | Gymcrak Premiere

1990-1988
1990
Cashtal Dazzler | Ruling Passion | Marienski
1989
Safawan | Top-Boot | Cottenham
1988
Jamarj | Quinlan Terry | Persian Emperor

The Silver Bowl Stakes is a flat handicap horse race in Great Britain open to three-year-olds. It is run at Haydock Park over a distance of 1 mile and 37 yards (1,643 metres), and it is scheduled to take place each year at the end of May.

== Winners ==
| Year | Winner | Weight | Jockey | Trainer | Time |
|---|---|---|---|---|---|
| 1986 | Al Bashaama | 7-10 | Paul Hamblett | Luca Cumani | 1:49.18 |
| 1987 | Mohamed Abdu | 7-08 | John Lowe | Steve Norton | 1:41.60 |
| 1988 | Jamarj | 9-07 | Mark Birch | Peter Easterby | 1:43.38 |
| 1989 | Safawan | 8-11 | Pat Eddery | Michael Stoute | 1:42.11 |
| 1990 | Cashtal Dazzler | 7-07 | Lindsay Charnock | Jack Berry | 1:40.35 |
| 1991 | Takaddum | 9-03 | Geoff Baxter | Peter Walwyn | 1:43.68 |
| 1992 | Sharpitor | 9-00 | John Reid | William Jarvis | 1:41.99 |
| 1993 | Moorish | 8-02 | Tom McLaughlin | Paul Cole | 1:46.76 |
| 1994 | Dance Turn | 8-05 | R Price | Robert Armstrong | 1:41.94 |
| 1995 | Sonic Boy | 8-12 | Jimmy Quinn | Fulke Johnson Houghton | 1:45.32 |
| 1996 | Winter Romance | 9-00 | Paul Eddery | Ed Dunlop | 1:45.59 |
| 1997 | Alezal | 9-01 | Seb Sanders | William Jarvis | 1:45.86 |
| 1998 | French Connection | 7-12 | Paul Fessey | Jack Berry | 1:47.46 |
| 1999 | Date | 8-13 | Willie Ryan | Ed Dunlop | 1:41.58 |
| 2000 | Atlantic Rhapsody | 8-03 | Joe Fanning | Mark Johnston | 1:46.64 |
| 2001 | Ecclesiastical (Note: The 2001 winner Ecclesiastical was later exported to Hong Kong and renamed Olympic Express) | 8-08 | Oscar Urbina | James Fanshawe | 1:42.96 |
| 2002 | Common World | 8-13 | Kieren Fallon | Gerard Butler | 1:43.80 |
| 2003 | Jazz Messenger | 7-12 | Paul Hanagan | Gerard Butler | 1:50.38 |
| 2004 | Gatwick | 8-13 | Sam Hitchcott | Mick Channon | 1:41.73 |
| 2005 | Home Affairs | 8-06 | Richard Hughes | Sir Michael Stoute | 1:41.18 |
| 2006 | Anna Pavlova | 9-05 | Paul Hanagan | Richard Fahey | 1:46.97 |
| 2007 | Tobosa | 9-07 | Michael Hills | William Jarvis | 1:42.15 |
| 2008 | Staying On | 9-01 | Adam Kirby | Walter Swinburn | 1:40.91 |
| 2009 | Desert Creek | 8-03 | Louis-Philippe Beuzelin | Sir Michael Stoute | 1:50.29 |
| 2010 | Balducci | 8-03 | David Probert | Andrew Balding | 1:42.20 |
| 2011 | Sagramor | 8-02 | Nicky Mackay | Hughie Morrison | 1:40.07 |
| 2012 | Gabrial | 9-01 | Jamie Spencer | Richard Fahey | 1:41.27 |
| 2013 | Shebebi | 8-02 | Liam Jones | Mark Johnston | 1:42.66 |
| 2014 | Chatez | 9-02 | Fergus Sweeney | Alan King | 1:47.77 |
| 2015 | Mutarakez | 9-01 | Paul Hanagan | Brian Meehan | 1:43.54 |
| 2016 | Garcia | 8-11 | Paul Hanagan | Richard Fahey | 1:44.36 |
| 2017 | Rusumaat | 9-03 | Richard Kingscote | Mark Johnston | 1:40.41 |
| 2018 | Crack On Crack On | 8-06 | David Probert | Clive Cox | 1:41.04 |
| 2019 | Beatboxer | 8-11 | Robert Havlin | John Gosden | 1:39.77 |
| | no race 2020 (Note: The 2020 running was cancelled because of the COVID-19 pandemic in the United Kingdom) |
| 2021 | Raadobarg | 9-00 | Jack Mitchell | Roger Varian | 1:51.61 |
| 2022 | Whoputfiftyinyou (Note: The 2022 winner Whoputfiftyinyou was later exported to Hong Kong and renamed The Best Peach) | 8-10 | David Probert | Clive Cox | 1:41.55 |
| 2023 | Covey | 8-11 | Frankie Dettori | John & Thady Gosden | 1:41.44 |
| 2024 | Nellie Leylax | 9-02 | Pierre-Louis Jamin | Tom Dascombe | 1:44.36 |
| 2025 | Teroomm | 9-06 | Silvestre de Sousa | Roger Varian | 1:42.43 |
| 2026 | Blue Courvoisier | 8-07 | Saffie Osborne | Clive Cox | 1:37:51 |

== See also ==
- Horse racing in Great Britain
- List of British flat horse races
