= Marygate Fillies' Stakes =

Flat horse race in Britain

- Class: Listed
- Location: York Racecourse; York, England
- Race type: Flat / Thoroughbred
- Sponsor: Clipper Logistics
- Website: York

Race information
- Distance: 5f (1,006 metres)
- Surface: Turf
- Track: Straight
- Qualification: Two-year-old fillies
- Weight: 9 st 0 lb Penalties; 5 lb for Group race winners 3 lb for Listed winners
- Purse: £70,000 (2023); 1st: £39,697

Marygate Fillies' Stakes
2026
Love A Giggle	Armor Supreme	Lover Girl

Previous years
2025
Secret Hideaway	Harry's Girl	Love Olivia
2024
Betty Clover	Miss Lamai	Running Queen
2023
Got To Love A Grey	Dorothy Lawrence	Gaiden
2022
Pillow Talk	Yahsat	Jumbeau
2021
Nymphadora	Canonized	Crazyland

2020-2011
2020
Sardinia Sunset	Furlong Factor	Country Carnival
2019
Good Vibes	Mighty Spirit	Lady Kermit
2018
Signora Cabello	Daphinia	Snazzy
2017
Main Desire	Neola	Mistress Of Venice
2016
Vona	Boater	Perfect Madge
2015
Delizia	Silk Bow	White Bullet
2014
Patience Alexander	Tiggy Wiggy	Zuhoor Baynoona
2013
Beldale Memory	Hoku	Classy Lassy
2012
Ceiling Kitty	Mayfield Girl	Effie B
2011
Miss Work of Art	Vocational	Bubbly Ballerina

2010-2005
2010
Primo Lady	Breedj	Fifth Ave
2009
Misheer	Aalsmeer	Little Scotland
2008
Bahamian Babe	Langs Lash	Aspen Darlin
2007
Janina	Tia Mia	Cristal Clear
2006
Gilded	Amber Valley	Cassiara
2005
Bow Bridge	Gamble In Gold	Ooh Aah Camara

The Marygate Fillies' Stakes is a Listed flat horse race in Great Britain open to fillies aged two years only. It is run at York over a distance of 5 furlongs (1,006 metres), and it is scheduled to take place each year in May.

The race was first run in 2005.

== Winners ==
Year	Winner	Jockey	Trainer	Time
2005	Bow Bridge	Dale Gibson	Mick Easterby	1:01.61
2006	Gilded	Richard Hughes	Richard Hannon Sr.	1:02.67
2007	Janina	Richard Hills	Barry Hills	0:58.73
2008	Bahamian Babe	Hayley Turner	Michael Bell	0:59.62
2009	Misheer	Neil Callan	Clive Brittain	1:01.94
2010	Primo Lady	David Probert	Gay Kelleway	0:59.42
2011	Miss Work of Art	Paul Hanagan	Richard Fahey	0:58.70
2012	Ceiling Kitty	Richard Kingscote	Tom Dascombe	1:01.46
2013	Beldale Memory	Jamie Spencer	Clive Cox	1:00.67
2014	Patience Alexander	Jim Crowley	David Evans	0:59.78
2015	Delizia	Silvestre de Sousa	Mark Johnston	0:58.28
2016	Vona	Jack Garrity	Richard Fahey	1:00.51
2017	Main Desire	Daniel Tudhope	Michael Bell	1:01.70
2018	Signora Cabello	Jason Hart	John Quinn	0:58.95
2019	Good Vibes	Harry Bentley	David Evans	0:59.75
2020 (Note: The 2020 race was run in July due to the COVID-19 pandemic in the United Kingdom)	Sardinia Sunset	Jason Watson	Roger Varian	0:59.94
2021	Nymphadora	Jason Watson	Andrew Balding	0:59.49
2022	Pillow Talk	Daniel Tudhope	Karl Burke	0:58.80
2023	Got To Love A Grey	Sam James	Karl Burke	0:58.22
2025	Secret Hideaway	P. J. McDonald	Adrian Keatley	0:59.85
2026	Love A Giggle	Clifford Lee	Karl Burke	0:59.85

== See also ==
- Horse racing in Great Britain
- List of British flat horse races
