= Rous Stakes =

Flat horse race in Britain

Rous Stakes
2026
Air Force One	Regional	Tuco Salamanca

Previous years
2025
Shagraan	Beautiful Diamond	Getreadytorumble
2024
Rumstar	Beautiful Diamond	Miaharris
2023
Emaraaty Ana	Korker	Nymphadora
2022
Manaccan	Ainsdale	Method
2021
Tis Marvellous	Minzaal	Dakota Gold

2020-2011
2020
Dakota Gold	Aljady	Wonderwork
2019
Dakota Gold	Arecibo	Danzeno
2018
Intense Romance	Mr Lupton	Spring Loaded
2018
Intense Romance	Mr Lupton	Spring Loaded
2017
Just Glamorous	Sir Robert Cheval	Waady
2016
Easy Road	Medicean Man	Mirza
2015
Dutch Masterpiece	Speed Hawk	Rathaath
2014
Justice Day	Kickboxer	Milly's Gift
2013
Steps	Eton Rifles	Medicean Man
2012
Doc Hay	Free Zone	Ponty Acclaim
2011
Move In Time	Addictive Dream	Mayson

2010-2001
2010
Tangerine Trees	Tax Free	Quest For Success
2009
Spin Cycle	Noble Storm	Run For The Hills
2008
Peace Offering	Siren's Gift	Princess Ellis
2007
Judd Street	Rowe Park	Tax Free
2006
Fantasy Believer	Prince Tamino	Pivotal's Princess
2005
Boogie Street	Corridor Creeper	Indian Maiden
2004
Nights Cross	Steve's Champ	Baltic King
2003
Colonel Cotton	Bali Royal	No Time
2002
Proud Boast	Smokin Beau	Autumnal
2001
Indian Prince	Smokin Beau	The Trader

2000-1991
2000
Rushcutter Bay	Astonished	Seraphina
1999
Sakha	Andreyev	Rambling Bear
1998
Bishops Court	Almaty	Dashing Blue
1997
Dashing Blue	Bishops Court	Tipsy Creek
1996
Croft Pool	Blue Iris	Anzio
1995
Dairine's Delight	Double Quick	Katya
1994
Eveningperformance	Millyant	Numbered Account
1993
My-O-My	Splice	Blyton Lad
1992
Blyton Lad	Garah	Artistic Reef
1991
Blyton Lad	Notley	Furajet

1990-1988
1990
Blyton Lad	Tod	Carol's Treasure
1989
Poyle George	Hadif	Paley Prince
1988
Teeming Shore	Perion	Princess Athena

The Rous Stakes is a Listed flat horse race in Great Britain open to horses aged three years or older. It is run at Ascot over a distance of 5 furlongs (1,006 metres), and it is scheduled to take place each year in October.

Prior to 2011 the race was run at Newmarket Racecourse.

== Winners ==
Year	Winner	Age	Jockey	Trainer	Time
1982	Ferryman	6	Billy Newnes	David Elsworth	1:02.42
1983	Play Our Song	3	Bryn Crossley	Paul Kelleway	1:00.49
1984	Cutlers Corner	3	Steve Cauthen	Bill Wightman	1:00.63
1985	Double Schwartz	4	Pat Eddery	Charlie Nelson	0:59.10
1986	Fayruz	3	Pat Eddery	Bill O'Gorman	0:58.97
1987	Chilibang	3	Willie Carson	John Dunlop	1:00.61
1988	Teeming Shore	3	George Duffield	Sir Mark Prescott	0:59.01
1989	Poyle George	4	Steve Cauthen	David Elsworth	1:00.22
1990	Blyton Lad	4	Stuart Webster	John Balding	0:58.85
1991	Blyton Lad	5	Stuart Webster	Bobby Beasley	0:58.60
1992	Blyton Lad	6	Stuart Webster	Maurice Camacho	0:58.46
1993	My-O-My	3	Michael Roberts	Tommy Stack	1:00.81
1994	Eveningperformance	3	Billy Newnes	Henry Candy	0:58.82
1995	Dairine's Delight	5	Frankie Dettori	Michael Cunningham	0:58.61
1996	Croft Pool	5	Gary Carter	Jeremy Glover	0:58.50
1997	Dashing Blue	4	Frankie Dettori	Ian Balding	0:58.86
1998	Bishops Court	4	Jimmy Fortune	Lynda Ramsden	1:01.31
1999	Sakha	3	Richard Hills	John Dunlop	0:59.51
2000	Rushcutter Bay	7	Franny Norton	Patrick Gilligan	0:59.47
2001	Indian Prince	3	Brett Doyle	Brian Meehan	0:59.01
2002	Proud Boast	4	Tony Culhane	Geraldine Rees	0:57.88
2003	Colonel Cotton	4	Willie Ryan	Neville Callaghan	0:59.11
2004	Nights Cross	3	Tony Culhane	Mick Channon	0:59.46
2005	Boogie Street	4	Richard Hughes	Richard Hannon Sr.	0:57.83
2006	Fantasy Believer	8	Jimmy Quinn	John Quinn	0:59.04
2007	Judd Street	5	Stephen Carson	Eve Johnson Houghton	0:57.56
2008	Peace Offering	8	Adrian Nicholls	David Nicholls	0:56.87
2009	Spin Cycle	3	Richard Mullen	Bryan Smart	0:58.25
2010	Tangerine Trees	5	Tom Eaves	Bryan Smart	0:59.24
2011	Move In Time	3	Robert Winston	Bryan Smart	0:59.82
2012	Doc Hay	5	Danny Tudhope	David O'Meara	1:01.59
2013	Steps	5	Jamie Spencer	Roger Varian	1:00.70
2014	Justice Day	3	John Egan	David Elsworth	1:02.11
2015	Dutch Masterpiece	5	George Baker	Gary Moore	0:59.79
2016	Easy Road	6	William Buick	Cathrine Erichsen	1:00.96
2017	Just Glamorous	4	Oisin Murphy	Ronald Harris	1:02.96
2018	Intense Romance	4	Callum Rodriguez	Michael Dods	1:01.45
2019	Dakota Gold	5	Connor Beasley	Michael Dods	1:01.12
2020 (Note: The 2020 running took place at Nottingham after the original Ascot fixture was abandoned due to waterlogging)	Dakota Gold	6	Connor Beasley	Michael Dods	0:59.76
2021	Tis Marvellous	7	Adam Kirby	Clive Cox	1:01.28
2022	Manaccan	3	Stevie Donohoe	John Ryan	1:02.24
2023	Emaraaty Ana	7	Neil Callan	Kevin Ryan	1:00.81
2024	Rumstar	4	Hector Crouch	Jonathan Portman	1:00.66
2025	Shagraan	4	Kieran Shoemark	Michael Appleby	1:03.86
2026	Air Force One	5	P. J. McDonald	Geoff Oldroyd	0:58.90

== See also ==
- Horse racing in Great Britain
- List of British flat horse races
