= List of British flat horse races =

A list of notable flat horse races which take place annually in Great Britain, under the authority of the British Horseracing Authority (BHA), including all conditions races which currently hold Group 1, 2, 3 or Listed status in the European Pattern.

== Races ==
The distances of the races are expressed in miles, furlongs and yards. In 2017 the BHA concluded a racecourse survey and remeasurement which led to some racecourses changing the exact distance of some races, or moving race start points to fit with advertised race distances. The distances in the table below are exact distances. Race distances are often given to the nearest furlong: e.g. The Derby's exact distance is 1 mile 4 furlongs and 6 yards, but it is called a 1 mile 4 furlong race.

The races in bold are run on an all-weather surface, and horses' names which are in italics won that race in the previous season.

Races are run on the Rowley Mile at Newmarket unless 'Newmarket (July)' is written, in which the July Course is used.

== Group 1 ==
Month	Race Name	Racecourse	Distance	Age/Sex	2026 winner
May	2000 Guineas Stakes	Newmarket	1m	3yo c&f	Bow Echo
May	1000 Guineas Stakes	Newmarket	1m	3yo f	True Love
May	Lockinge Stakes	Newbury	1m	4yo+	Notable Speech
June	Oaks Stakes	Epsom	1m 4f 6y	3yo f	Thundering On
June	Coronation Cup	Epsom	1m 4f 6y	4yo+	Bay City Roller
June	Derby Stakes	Epsom	1m 4f 6y	3yo c&f	Christmas Day
June	Queen Anne Stakes	Ascot	1m	4yo+	Ten Bob Tony
June	King Charles III Stakes	Ascot	5f	3yo+	Mission Central
June	St. James's Palace Stakes	Ascot	7f 213y	3yo c	Bow Echo
June	Prince of Wales's Stakes	Ascot	1m 1f 212y	4yo+	Ombudsman
June	Gold Cup	Ascot	2m 3f 210y	4yo+	Scandinavia
June	Commonwealth Cup	Ascot	6f	3yo c&f	Venetian Sun
June	Coronation Stakes	Ascot	7f 213y	3yo f	Precise
June	Queen Elizabeth II Jubilee Stakes	Ascot	6f	4yo+	Almeraq
July	Eclipse Stakes	Sandown	1m 1f 209y	3yo+	Constitution River
July	Falmouth Stakes	Newmarket (July)	1m	3yo+ f	Blue Bolt
July	July Cup	Newmarket (July)	6f	3yo+	Comanche Brave
July	King George VI and Queen Elizabeth Stakes	Ascot	1m 3f 211y	3yo+	Kalpana
July	Goodwood Cup	Goodwood	2m	3yo+	Scandinavia
July	Sussex Stakes	Goodwood	1m	3yo+	Bow Echo
July	Nassau Stakes	Goodwood	1m 1f 197y	3yo+ f	Diamond Necklace
August	Juddmonte International	York	1m 2f 56y	3yo+	Item
August	Yorkshire Oaks	York	1m 3f 188y	3yo+ f	Kalpana
August	Nunthorpe Stakes	York	5f	2yo+	Bacio
August	City of York Stakes	York	7f	3yo+	Notable Speech
September	Sprint Cup	Haydock	6f	3yo+	Almeraq
September	St Leger Stakes	Doncaster	1m 6f 115y	3yo c&f	Highwayman
September	Cheveley Park Stakes	Newmarket	6f	2yo f	Sun Goddess
September	Middle Park Stakes	Newmarket	6f	2yo c	Orthodox
October	Sun Chariot Stakes	Newmarket	1m	3yo+ f	Blue Bolt
October	Fillies' Mile	Newmarket	1m	2yo f	Musical Times
October	Dewhurst Stakes	Newmarket	7f	2yo c&f	Darkness Falls
October	British Champions Long Distance Cup	Ascot	1m 7f 209y	3yo+	Mount Atlas
October	British Champions Sprint Stakes	Ascot	6f	3yo+	Almeraq
October	British Champions Fillies' and Mares' Stakes	Ascot	1m 3f 211y	3yo+ f	Minnie Hauk
October	Queen Elizabeth II Stakes	Ascot	1m	3yo+	Talk Of New York
October	Champion Stakes	Ascot	1m 1f 212y	3yo+	Ombudsman
October	Futurity Trophy	Doncaster	1m	2yo c&f	Giant Sequoia

== Group 2 ==
Month	Race Name	Racecourse	Distance	Age/Sex	2026 winner
April	Sandown Mile	Sandown	1m	4yo+	Opera Ballo
May	Jockey Club Stakes	Newmarket	1m 4f	4yo+	Santorini Star
May	Dahlia Stakes	Newmarket	1m 1f	4yo+ f	Jancis
May	Huxley Stakes	Chester	1m 2f 70y	4yo+	Lambourn
May	Minster Stakes	York	6f	3yo+	Elmonjed
May	Middleton Stakes	York	1m 2f 56y	4yo+ f	See The Fire
May	Dante Stakes	York	1m 2f 56y	3yo	Item
May	Yorkshire Cup	York	1m 5f 188y	4yo+	Rahiebb
May	Sandy Lane Stakes	Haydock	6f	3yo	Venetian Sun
May	Temple Stakes	Haydock	5f	3yo+	Night Raider
June	Coventry Stakes	Ascot	6f	2yo	Great Barrier Reef
June	Queen Mary Stakes	Ascot	5f	2yo f	Victorious
June	Queen's Vase	Ascot	1m 6f 34y	3yo	Limestone
June	Duke of Cambridge Stakes	Ascot	7f 213y	4yo+ f	Blue Bolt
June	Ribblesdale Stakes	Ascot	1m 3f 211y	3yo f	Earth Shot
June	King Edward VII Stakes	Ascot	1m 3f 211y	3yo c&g	Causeway
June	Norfolk Stakes	Ascot	5f	2yo	Orthodox
June	Hardwicke Stakes	Ascot	1m 3f 211y	4yo+	Giavellotto
July	Lancashire Oaks	Haydock (Note: Run at Newmarket (July) in 2026 due to Haydock track damage)	1m 4f	3yo+ f	Tattycoram
July	July Stakes	Newmarket (July)	6f	2yo c&g	Inner City Blues
July	Princess of Wales's Stakes	Newmarket (July)	1m 4f	3yo+	Rebel's Romance
July	Duchess of Cambridge Stakes	Newmarket (July)	6f	2yo f	Senorita Bonita
July	Summer Mile Stakes	Ascot	7f 213y	4yo+	Zeus Olympios
July	Superlative Stakes	Newmarket (July)	7f	2yo	Al Hudaiba
July	York Stakes	York	1m 2f 56y	3yo+	Item
July	Vintage Stakes	Goodwood	7f	2yo	Dr Rascal
July	Lennox Stakes	Goodwood	7f	3yo+	Lake Forest
July	Richmond Stakes	Goodwood	6f	2yo c&g	Man's Best Friend
July	King George Stakes	Goodwood	5f	3yo+	American Affair
August	Lillie Langtry Stakes	Goodwood	1m 6f	3yo+ f	Goodie Two Shoes
August	Hungerford Stakes	Newbury	7f	3yo+	Coppull
August	Great Voltigeur Stakes	York	1m 3f 188y	3yo c&g	Maltese Cross
August	Lowther Stakes	York	6f	2yo f	Libertango
August	Lonsdale Cup	York	2m 56y	3yo+	Al Nayyir
August	Gimcrack Stakes	York	6f	2yo c&g	Arapaho Gold
August	Celebration Mile	Goodwood	1m	3yo+	Zavateri
September	Park Hill Stakes	Doncaster	1m 6f 115y	3yo+ f	Waardah
September	May Hill Stakes	Doncaster	1m	2yo f	Musical Times
September	Flying Childers Stakes	Doncaster	5f 3y	2yo	Final Objective
September	Doncaster Cup	Doncaster	2m 1f 197y	3yo+	Caballo De Mar
September	Champagne Stakes	Doncaster	7f 6y	2yo c&g	Desert Castle
September	Park Stakes	Doncaster	7f 6y	3yo+	More Thunder
September	Mill Reef Stakes	Newbury	6f	2yo	Nabati
September	Rockfel Stakes	Newmarket	7f	2yo f	Pensando A Te
September	Joel Stakes	Newmarket	1m	3yo+	Talk Of New York
September	Royal Lodge Stakes	Newmarket	1m	2yo c&g	Haffner
October	Challenge Stakes	Newmarket	7f	3yo+	Never So Brave

== Group 3 ==
Month	Race Name	Racecourse	Distance	Age/Sex	2026 winner
**February**	**Winter Derby**	**Lingfield**	**1m 2f**	**4yo+**	**Sky Safari**
April	Earl of Sefton Stakes	Newmarket	1m 1f	4yo+	Damysus
April	Nell Gwyn Stakes	Newmarket	7f	3yo f	Azleet
April	Abernant Stakes	Newmarket	6f	3yo+	Run To Freedom
April	Craven Stakes	Newmarket	1m	3yo c&g	Oxagon
April	Fred Darling Stakes	Newbury	7f	3yo f	Sukanya
April	Greenham Stakes	Newbury	7f	3yo c&g	Alparslan
April	John Porter Stakes	Newbury	1m 4f	4yo+	Convergent
April	Gordon Richards Stakes	Sandown	1m 1f 209y	4yo+	Saddadd
April	Sandown Classic Trial	Sandown	1m 1f 209y	3yo	Raaheeb
May	Sagaro Stakes	Ascot	1m 7f 209y	4yo+	Sweet William
May	Pavilion Stakes	Ascot	6f	3yo	Coppull
May	Palace House Stakes	Newmarket	5f	3yo+	Night Raider
May	Chester Vase	Chester	1m 4f 63y	3yo c&g	Benvenuto Cellini
May	Ormonde Stakes	Chester	1m 5f 84y	4yo+	Jan Brueghel
May	Chartwell Fillies' Stakes	Lingfield	7f	3yo+ f	Royal Velvet
May	Musidora Stakes	York	1m 2f 56y	3yo f	Legacy Link
May	Aston Park Stakes	Newbury	1m 4f	4yo+	Kalpana
May	Brontë Cup	York	1m 5f 188y	4yo+ f	Danielle
May	Henry II Stakes	Sandown	2m 50y	4yo+	Dubai Future
May	Brigadier Gerard Stakes	Sandown	1m 1f 209y	4yo+	Ombudsman
May	Lester Piggott Stakes	Haydock (Note: Run at Carlisle in 2026 due to Haydock track damage)	1m 3f 39y	4yo+ f	Estrange
June	Diomed Stakes	Epsom	1m 113y	3yo+	Seagulls Eleven
June	Tattenham Corner Stakes	Epsom	7f 3y	4yo+	Ten Bob Tony
June	Princess Elizabeth Stakes	Epsom	1m 113y	3yo+ f	Sparks Fly
June	Hampton Court Stakes	Ascot	1m 1f 212y	3yo	Generic
June	Albany Stakes	Ascot	6f	2yo f	Libertango
June	Jersey Stakes	Ascot	7f	3yo	Thesecretadversary
**June**	**Hoppings Stakes**	**Newcastle**	**1m 2f 42y**	**3yo+ f**	**Botagoz**
**June**	**Chipchase Stakes**	**Newcastle**	**6f**	**3yo+**	**Paborus**
June	Criterion Stakes	York	7f	3yo+	Qirat
July	Sprint Stakes	Sandown	5f 10y	3yo+	Rumstar
July	Bahrain Trophy	Newmarket (July)	1m 5f	3yo	Point Of Law
July	Summer Stakes	York	6f	3yo+ f	Flora Of Bermuda
July	John Smith's Silver Cup Stakes	York	1m 5f 188y	4yo+	Mount Atlas
July	Hackwood Stakes	Newbury	6f	3yo+	Symbol Of Honour
July	Princess Margaret Stakes	Ascot	6f	2yo f	Moonrise
July	Valiant Stakes	Ascot	7f 213y	3yo+ f	Kon Tiki
July	Oak Tree Stakes	Goodwood	7f	3yo+ f	Flora Of Bermuda
July	Molecomb Stakes	Goodwood	5f	2yo	Pershaada
July	Gordon Stakes	Goodwood	1m 3f 218y	3yo	Enceladus
July	Thoroughbred Stakes	Goodwood	1m	3yo	Shayem
August	Glorious Stakes	Goodwood	1m 3f 218y	4yo+	Enfjaar
August	Sweet Solera Stakes	Newmarket (July)	7f	2yo f	Sugar Yes Please
August	Rose of Lancaster Stakes	Haydock	1m 2f 42y	3yo+	Sallaal
August	Geoffrey Freer Stakes	Newbury	1m 5f 61y	3yo+	Wine Dark Sea
August	Acomb Stakes	York	7f	2yo	Haffner
August	Strensall Stakes	York	1m 177y	3yo+	Archivist
August	Atalanta Stakes	Sandown	1m	3yo+ f	Love Dynasty
August	Solario Stakes	Sandown	7f	2yo	Alfred Wallace
August	Prestige Stakes	Goodwood	7f	2yo f	Light Of Dawn
September	Dick Poole Fillies' Stakes	Salisbury	6f	2yo f	Acclamation Star
September	Superior Mile	Haydock	7f 212y	3yo+	Persica
**September**	**September Stakes**	**Kempton**	**1m 3f 219y**	**3yo+**	**Pride Of Arras**
**September**	**Sirenia Stakes**	**Kempton**	**6f**	**2yo**	**Moonrise**
September	Winter Hill Stakes	Windsor	1m 2f	3yo	Maho Bay
September	Sceptre Stakes	Doncaster	7f 6y	3yo+ f	Pina Sonata
September	World Trophy	Newbury	5f 34y	3yo+	Miss Yechance
September	Firth of Clyde Stakes	Ayr	6f	2yo f	Silent Beauty
September	Somerville Tattersall Stakes	Newmarket	7f	2yo c&g	Fuel The Jet
September	Princess Royal Stakes	Newmarket	1m 4f	3yo+ f	Coedana
October	Cumberland Lodge Stakes	Ascot	1m 3f 211y	4yo+	Al Aasy
October	Bengough Stakes	Ascot	6f	3yo+	Hidden Force
October	Cornwallis Stakes	Newmarket	5f	2yo	Mussab
October	Oh So Sharp Stakes	Newmarket	7f	2yo f	Lola De Valence
October	Pride Stakes	Newmarket	1m 2f	3yo+ f	Song Of The Clouds
October	Darley Stakes	Newmarket	1m 1f	3yo+	Humidity
October	Zetland Stakes	Newmarket	1m 2f	2yo	Drumbeat
October	Autumn Stakes	Newmarket	1m	2yo	Rock Montreal
October	St Simon Stakes	Newbury (Note: Run at Newmarket in 2026 due to Newbury being waterlogged)	1m 4f	3yo+	Aegean Prince
October	Horris Hill Stakes	Newbury (Note: Run at Newmarket in 2026 due to Newbury being waterlogged and opened to fillies)	7f	2yo c&g	Bengal Tiger

== Listed ==
Month	Race Name	Racecourse	Distance	Age/Sex	2026 winner
**January**	**Kachy Stakes**	**Lingfield**	**6f 1y**	**4yo+**	**Completely Random**; **Diligent Harry** (dh)
**February**	**Tandridge Stakes**	**Southwell**	**1m 13y**	**4yo+**	**Chancellor**
**February**	**Hever Sprint Stakes**	**Lingfield**	**5f 6y**	**4yo+**	**Diligent Harry**
**February**	**Spring Cup**	**Lingfield**	**7f 1y**	**3yo**	**Hilitany**
**March**	**Lady Wulfruna Stakes**	**Wolverhampton**	**7f 36y**	**4yo+**	**Cool Hoof Luke**
March	Cammidge Trophy	Doncaster	6f 2y	3yo+	Aramram
March	Doncaster Mile Stakes	Doncaster	1m	4yo+	Docklands
**March**	**Snowdrop Fillies' Stakes**	**Kempton**	**1m**	**4yo+ f**	**Pina Sonata**
**April**	**Burradon Stakes**	**Newcastle**	**1m 5y**	**3yo**	**Timeforshowcasing**
April	Goliath Cup Stakes	Musselburgh	1m 5f 216y	4yo+	Al Qareem
April	Lansdown Fillies' Stakes	Bath	5f 10y	3yo+ f	Azure Angel
**April**	**Magnolia Stakes**	**Kempton**	**1m 1f 219y**	**4yo+**	**Gethin**
April	Feilden Stakes	Newmarket	1m 1f	3yo	Morshdi
April	Nottinghamshire Oaks	Nottingham	1m 2f 50y	4yo+ f	See The Fire
April	Blue Riband Trial Stakes	Epsom	1m 2f 17y	3yo	Saxon Street
May	Newmarket Stakes	Newmarket	1m 2f	3yo c&g	Ancient Egypt
May	Paradise Stakes	Ascot	1m	4yo+	Jonquil
May	Daisy Warwick Stakes	Goodwood	1m 3f 218y	4yo+ f	Tattycoram
May	King Charles II Stakes	Newmarket	7f	3yo	Saber Strike
May	Ellen Chaloner Stakes	Newmarket	6f	3yo+ f	Flora Of Bermuda
**May**	**Chelmer Fillies' Stakes**	**Chelmsford (Note: Run at Goodwood in 2026 due to Chelmsford losing its BHA racing licence)**	**6f**	**3yo f**	**Soul Love**
May	Conqueror Stakes	Goodwood	1m	3yo+ f	Blue Bolt
May	Pretty Polly Stakes	Newmarket	1m 2f	3yo f	Jennifer Jane
May	Cheshire Oaks	Chester	1m 3f 75y	3yo f	Amelia Earhart
May	Dee Stakes	Chester	1m 2f 70y	3yo c&g	Constitution River
May	Lingfield Oaks Trial	Lingfield	1m 3f 133y	3yo f	Cameo
May	Lingfield Derby Trial	Lingfield	1m 3f 133y	3yo c&g	Maltese Cross
May	Spring Trophy	Haydock	6f 212y	3yo+	Lake Forest
May	Westow Stakes	York	5f	3yo	Dickensian
May	Michael Seely Memorial Stakes	York	7f 192y	3yo f	Lilt
May	Marygate Fillies' Stakes	York	5f	2yo f	Love A Giggle
May	Fillies' Trial Stakes	Newbury	1m 2f	3yo f	Esna
May	Carnarvon Stakes	Newbury	6f	3yo	Song Of The Clyde
May	Cecil Frail Stakes	Haydock	6f	3yo+ f	Rosy Affair
May	Festival Stakes	Goodwood	1m 1f 197y	4yo+	Boiling Point
May	Hedge of Oak Stakes	Haydock	1m 2f 100y	4yo+ f	Dreamasar
May	Cocked Hat Stakes	Goodwood	1m 3f 44y	3yo c&g	Golden Story
May	Height of Fashion Stakes	Goodwood	1m 1f 197y	3yo f	Inis Mor
May	Cathedral Stakes	Salisbury	6f	3yo+	Almeraq
May	National Stakes	Sandown	5f 10y	2yo	Where Love Lives
May	Heron Stakes	Sandown	1m	3yo	Talk Of New York
May	Achilles Stakes	Haydock (Note: Run at Carlisle in 2026 due to Haydock track damage)	5f	3yo+	Washington Heights
June	Surrey Stakes	Epsom	7f 3y	3yo	Ellusive Butterfly
June	Queen of Scots Stakes	Musselburgh	7f 15y	3yo+ f	Circe
June	Agnes Keyser Fillies' Stakes	Goodwood	1m 1f 197y	3yo f	Venetia
June	Tapster Stakes	Goodwood	1m 3f 218y	4yo+	Tenability
June	Scurry Stakes	Sandown	5f 10y	3yo	Words Of Truth
June	Grand Cup	York	1m 5f 188y	4yo+	Gregory
June	Wolferton Stakes	Ascot	1m 1f 212y	4yo+	Map Of Stars
June	Windsor Castle Stakes	Ascot	6f	2yo	King Of Cloughan
June	Chesham Stakes	Ascot	7f	2yo	Nola Soul
June	Land O'Burns Fillies' Stakes	Ayr	5f	3yo+ f	Argentine Tango
June	Pontefract Castle Stakes	Pontefract	1m 4f 5y	4yo+ f	Coedana
June	Eternal Stakes	Carlisle	6f 195y	3yo f	Ellusive Butterfly
June	Empress Stakes	Newmarket (July)	6f	2yo f	Glorious Game; Havana Sprite (dh)
**June**	**Queen Charlotte Fillies' Stakes**	**Chelmsford (Note: Run at Chester in 2026 due to Chelmsford losing its BHA racing licence)**	**7f 1y**	**4yo+ f**	**Bellarchi**
July	Dragon Stakes	Sandown	5f 10y	2yo	Bint Archange
July	Gala Stakes	Sandown	1m 1f 209y	3yo+	Sallaal
July	Esher Stakes	Sandown	2m 50y	4yo+	Lazy Griff
July	Coral Distaff	Sandown	1m	3yo f	Secret Of Life
July	Charlie Wood Stakes	Beverley	1m 4f 23y	4yo+	Al Aasy
July	Pipalong Stakes	Pontefract	1m 6y	4yo+ f	Radiant Beauty
July	Sir Henry Cecil Stakes	Newmarket (July)	1m	3yo	Shayem
July	City Walls Stakes	York	5f	3yo+	Redorange
July	City Plate	Chester	7f 1y	3yo+	Northern Champion
July	Rose Bowl Stakes	Newbury	6f 8y	2yo	Arapaho Gold
July	Glasgow Stakes	Hamilton	1m 3f 14y	3yo	Superior Choice
July	Steventon Stakes	Newbury	1m 2f	3yo+	Persica
July	Aphrodite Stakes	Newmarket (July)	1m 4f	3yo+ f	Brielle
July	Star Stakes	Sandown	7f	2yo f	Aperoll
July	Pat Eddery Stakes	Ascot	7f	2yo	Alfred Wallace
July	Lyric Stakes	York	1m 2f 56y	3yo+ f	Diamond Rain
July	Pomfret Stakes	Pontefract	1m 6y	3yo+	Holloway Boy
August	Chalice Stakes	Newmarket (July)	1m 4f	3yo+ f	Romantic Symphony
August	Queensferry Stakes	Chester	6f 17y	3yo	Simplify
August	Dick Hern Fillies' Stakes	Haydock	7f 212y	3yo+ f	Calendar Girl
August	Stonehenge Stakes	Salisbury	1m	2yo	Quest For Stars
August	Upavon Fillies' Stakes	Salisbury	1m 1f 201y	3yo+ f	On Message
August	St Hugh's Stakes	Newbury	5f 34y	2yo f	Angels Lane
August	Flying Fillies' Stakes	Pontefract	6f	3yo+ f	America Queen
August	Galtres Stakes	York	1m 3f 188y	3yo+ f	Prizeland
August	Chester Stakes	Chester	1m 6f 87y	3yo+	Midak
August	Hopeful Stakes	Newmarket (July)	6f	3yo+	Prince Of India
August	Roses Stakes	York	5f	2yo	Sale Shark
August	August Stakes	Windsor	1m 3f 99y	4yo+	Tenability
August	Beverley Bullet Sprint Stakes	Beverley	5f	3yo+	Jm Jungle
August	Ripon Champion Two Years Old Trophy	Ripon	6f	2yo	Silent Beauty
September	Ascendant Stakes	Haydock	7f 212y	2yo	First Law
September	Garrowby Stakes	York	6f	3yo+	Extremely Zain
September	Flying Scotsman Stakes	Doncaster	7f 6y	2yo	Forbidden Fire
September	Stand Cup	Chester	1m 4f 63y	3yo+	Plage De Havre
September	Fortune Stakes	Sandown	1m	3yo+	Cerro Blanco
September	John Musker Fillies' Stakes	Yarmouth	1m 2f 23y	3yo+ f	Naga
September	Harry Rosebery Stakes	Ayr	5f	2yo	Mussab
September	Arran Scottish Fillies' Sprint Stakes	Ayr	5f 110y	3yo+ f	Fluorescence
September	Dubai Duty Free Cup	Newbury	7f	3yo+	Catullus
September	Doonside Cup	Ayr	1m 2f	3yo+	Fast Tracker
September	Foundation Stakes	Goodwood	1m 1f 197y	3yo+	Respond
September	Jockey Club Rose Bowl	Newmarket	2m	3yo+	Gregory
September	Rosemary Stakes	Newmarket	1m	3yo+ f	Alobayyah
September	Godolphin Stakes	Newmarket	1m 4f	3yo	Fortitudine
October	Noel Murless Stakes	Ascot	1m 6f 34y	3yo	Infraad
October	October Stakes	Ascot	7f	3yo+ f	So Regal
October	Rous Stakes	Ascot	5f	3yo+	Air Force One
October	Two-Year-Old Trophy	Redcar	6f	2yo	Satellite Of Love
October	Guisborough Stakes	Redcar	7f	3yo+	Sondad
October	Beckford Stakes	Bath	1m 6f	3yo+ f	Brilliant Star
October	Boadicea Stakes	Newmarket	6f	3yo+ f	Ruby's Angel
October	Rockingham Stakes	York	6f	2yo	Cut A Dash
October	Silver Tankard Stakes	Pontefract	1m 6y	2yo	King High
October	Doncaster Stakes	Doncaster	6f 2y	2yo	Bengal Tiger
October	Radley Stakes	Newbury	7f	2yo f	abandoned
October	Robin Hood Stakes	Nottingham	1m 75y	3yo+	Oolong Poobong
October	Bosra Sham Stakes	Newmarket	6f	2yo f	Siena Storm
October	Montrose Stakes	Newmarket	1m	2yo f	Haldon Pier
October	James Seymour Stakes	Newmarket	1m 2f	3yo+	Arabian Light
November	Wentworth Stakes	Doncaster	6f 2y	3yo+	Coul Angel
November	Gillies Fillies' Stakes	Doncaster	1m 2f 43y	3yo+ f	Seren Star
**November**	**River Eden Fillies' Stakes**	**Lingfield**	**1m 5f 1y**	**3yo+ f**	**Little Dorrit**
**November**	**Fleur De Lys Fillies' Stakes**	**Lingfield**	**1m 1y**	**3yo+ f**	**Kon Tiki**
**November**	**Floodlit Stakes**	**Kempton**	**1m 3f 219y**	**3yo+**
**November**	**Golden Rose Stakes**	**Southwell**	**6f 17y**	**3yo+**
**November**	**Churchill Stakes**	**Southwell**	**1m 3f 24y**	**3yo+**
**December**	**Hyde Stakes**	**Kempton**	**1m**	**3yo+**
**December**	**Wild Flower Stakes**	**Kempton**	**1m 3f 219y**	**3yo+**
**December**	**Quebec Stakes**	**Lingfield**	**1m 2f 1y**	**3yo+**

== Heritage Handicaps ==
Month	Race Name	Racecourse	Distance	Value £K	Age/Sex	2026 winner
March	Lincoln Handicap	Doncaster	1m	150	4yo+	Urban Lion
May	Betfred Handicap	Newmarket	6f	100	4yo+	Double Rush
May	Suffolk Stakes	Newmarket	1m 1f	100	3yo+	Erzindjan
May	Betfred Handicap	Newmarket	1m 6f	100	4yo+	Goblet Of Fire
May	Chester Cup	Chester	2m 2f 140y	170	4yo+	A Piece Of Heaven
May	Victoria Cup	Ascot	7f	100	4yo+	The Wizard Of Eye
May	London Gold Cup	Newbury	1m 2f	100	3yo	Lost Boys
May	Silver Bowl	Haydock (Note: Run at Carlisle in 2026 due to Haydock track damage)	7f 173y	100	3yo	Blue Courvoisier
June	Epsom Dash	Epsom	5f	120	4yo+	Arklow Lad
June	Ascot Stakes	Ascot	2m 3f 210y	120	4yo+	Kizlyar
June	Royal Hunt Cup	Ascot	1m	175	3yo+	Rogue Diplomat
June	King George V Stakes	Ascot	1m 3f 211y	120	3yo	Enceladus
June	Britannia Stakes	Ascot	1m	120	3yo c&g	Moonfall
June	Wokingham Stakes	Ascot	6f	175	3yo+	Double Rush
**June**	**Northumberland Plate**	**Newcastle**	**2m 56y**	**150**	**3yo+**	**Align The Stars**
July	Betway Handicap	Newmarket (July)	6f	100	3yo	Jazl
July	Oddschecker Handicap	Newmarket (July)	1m 2f	100	3yo	Heraldry
July	Betway Trophy	Newmarket (July)	1m 6f	100	4yo+	Valedictory
July	Club 26 Heritage Handicap	Ascot	5f	100	3yo+	Dubai Bling
July	Bunbury Cup	Newmarket (July)	7f	100	3yo+	Aalto
July	John Smith's Cup	York	1m 2f 56y	200	3yo+	Raammee
July	Sky Bet Dash	York	6f	100	3yo+	Stratusnine
July	International Stakes	Ascot	7f	150	3yo+	Amazing Journey
July	Golden Mile	Goodwood	1m	175	3yo+	Archivist
August	Stewards' Cup	Goodwood	6f	250	3yo+	Evening Saigon
August	Hong Kong Jockey Club World Pool Handicap	York	5f 89y	135	4yo+	Air Force One
August	Sky Bet Stayers Handicap	York	2m 56y	100	3yo+	Small Fry
August	Irish Thoroughbred Marketing Handicap	York	5f	100	3yo	Miss Yechance
August	Sir Kevin Sinfield 7 In 7 Grand Finale Handicap	York	7f 192y	150	3yo+	The Lost King
August	Sky Bet Mile	York	7f 192y	100	3yo	Blue Courvoisier
August	Assured Data Protection Handicap	York	1m 3f 188y	120	3yo+	Plage De Havre
August	Lanark Silver Bell	Hamilton	1m 4f 15y	103	3yo+	Evanesco
August	Melrose Handicap	York	1m 5f 188y	180	3yo	Infraad
August	Ebor Handicap	York	1m 5f 188y	500	4yo+	Daiquiri Bay
August	Constantine Handicap	York	6f	135	3yo+	Sondad
August	Sky Bet Dav Reid Finale Handicap	York	1m 2f 56y	100	3yo+	Raammee
September	tote.co.uk Money Back 2nd Handicap	Ascot	1m 3f 211y	100	3yo	Turty Tree
September	Watergate Cup	Chester	1m 7f 196y	100	3yo+	Pole Star
September	Portland Handicap	Doncaster	5f 143y	100	3yo+	Air Force One
September	Ayr Gold Cup	Ayr	6f	180	3yo+	Pellitory
September	Cambridgeshire Handicap	Newmarket	1m 1f	200	3yo+	Pierre Royal
October	BetMGM Challenge Cup	Ascot	7f	180	3yo+	Mezcala
October	Old Rowley Cup	Newmarket	1m 4f	100	3yo	Study Of Words
October	Sky Bet Sprint Trophy	York	6f	100	3yo+	Coul Angel
October	Cesarewitch Handicap	Newmarket	2m 2f	175	3yo+	Alphonse Le Grande

== Other selected handicaps ==
Criteria for inclusion;

- Class 2 or Class 3 races worth £75,000 or more and which are not consolation races for runners eliminated from other handicaps.
- Races worth £50,000 or more which are a course's most important race of the season or which have historical importance.
- Other handicap races with a linked article.

Month	Race Name	Racecourse	Distance	Class	Value £K	Age/Sex	2026 winner
**January**	**Winter Oaks Fillies' Handicap**	**Lingfield**	**1m 2f**	**2**	**110**	**4yo+ f**	**Morrophore**
**March**	**Rosebery Handicap**	**Kempton**	**1m 2f 219y**	**2**	**100**	**4yo+**	**Gamrai**
**April**	**All-Weather 3 Year Old Championships Handicap**	**Newcastle**	**6f**	**2**	**150**	**3yo**	**Al Najashi**
**April**	**Fillies' And Mares' Championships Handicap**	**Newcastle**	**7f 14y**	**2**	**150**	**4yo+ f**	**Stateira**
**April**	**All-Weather Championships Mile Handicap**	**Newcastle**	**1m 5y**	**2**	**150**	**4yo+**	**Tyrrhenian Sea**
**April**	**All-Weather Sprint Handicap**	**Newcastle**	**6f**	**2**	**150**	**4yo+**	**Wiltshire**
**April**	**All-Weather Easter Classic Middle Distance Handicap**	**Newcastle**	**1m 2f 42y**	**2**	**175**	**4yo+**	**The Glen Rovers**
**April**	**All-Weather Easter Plate Marathon Handicap**	**Newcastle**	**2m 56y**	**2**	**175**	**4yo+**	**Berkshire Sundance**
April	Silver Arrow Handicap	Musselburgh	7f 15y	2	50	4yo+	Bellarchi
April	Queen's Cup	Musselburgh	1m 5f 216y	3	50	4yo+	Team Player
April	Scottish Sprint Cup	Musselburgh	5f 1y	2	70	4yo+	Pilgrim
April	Spring Cup	Newbury	1m	2	70	4yo+	Linwood
April	Esher Cup	Sandown	1m	2	30	3yo	Laureate Crown
April	King Richard III Cup	Leicester	6f	2	50	4yo+	Strike Red
April	City and Suburban Handicap	Epsom	1m 2f 17y	2	45	4yo+	Rathgar
April	Great Metropolitan Handicap	Epsom	1m 4f 6y	3	25	4yo+	Night Breeze
May	Thirsk Hunt Cup	Thirsk	7f 218y	2	60	4yo+	Mirsky
May	Jorvik Handicap	York	1m 3f 188y	2	65	4yo+	Klassleader
May	Hambleton Handicap	York	7f 192y	2	75	4yo+	Maybe Not
May	Hong Kong Jockey Club World Pool Handicap	Newbury	6f	2	75	4yo+	Far Above Dream
May	Boyle Sports Home Of The Early Payout Handicap	Newbury	1m	2	75	4yo+	Classic
May	Harroways Handicap	Goodwood	7f	2	100	3yo	Catullus
May	Zetland Gold Cup	Redcar	1m 2f 1y	2	40	3yo+	Danger Bay
May	Whitsun Cup	Sandown	1m	3	15	4yo+	Boyfriend
June	3YO Dash	Epsom	5f	2	75	3yo	Naana's Shadow
June	Betfred 'Nifty 50' Handicap	Epsom	1m 2f 17y	2	120	4yo+	Sallaal
June	HKJC World Pool Handicap	Epsom	1m 113y	2	75	4yo+	Mister Winston
June	Debenhams Handicap	Epsom	7f 3y	2	75	3yo+	Colombier
June	Lester Piggott Handicap	Epsom	1m 2f 17y	2	75	3yo	Folk Pageant
June	Northern Dancer Handicap	Epsom	1m 4f 6y	2	75	4yo+	Too Soon
June	JRA Tokyo Trophy Handicap	Epsom	6f 3y	2	75	4yo+	Sondad
June	Macmillan Sprint	York	6f	2	125	3yo	Thunder Call
June	Copper Horse Stakes	Ascot	1m 6f 34y	2	120	4yo+	Daiquiri Bay
June	Kensington Palace Stakes	Ascot	1m	2	120	4yo+ f	Alobayyah
June	Buckingham Palace Stakes	Ascot	7f	2	120	3yo+	Mezcala
June	Duke of Edinburgh Stakes	Ascot	1m 3f 211y	2	120	3yo+	Opportunity
June	Sandringham Stakes	Ascot	1m	2	120	3yo f	Green Carrera
June	Palace of Holyroodhouse Stakes	Ascot	5f	2	120	3yo	Bacio
June	Golden Gates Stakes	Ascot	1m 1f 212y	2	120	3yo	Lost Boys
June	Carlisle Bell	Carlisle	7f 173y	4	30	3yo+	Priapos
**June**	**Gosforth Park Cup**	**Newcastle**	**5f**	**2**	**60**	**3yo+**	**Al Shabab Storm**
July	Betway Bet £10 Get £40 Handicap	Haydock (Note: Run at Newmarket (July) in 2026 due to Haydock track damage)	1m 6f	2	100	3yo	Mythical Bay
July	Coral Challenge	Sandown	1m	2	120	3yo+	Indalo
July	Old Newton Cup	Haydock (Note: Run at Newmarket (July) in 2026 due to Haydock track damage)	1m 4f	2	125	4yo+	Sportingsilvermine
July	Pertemps Handicap	Newbury	2m 110y	2	60	3yo+	Shrimp Shady
July	Chesterfield Cup	Goodwood	1m 1f 197y	2	120	4yo+	Al Aali
July	Coral Rewards Shaker Handicap	Goodwood	5f	2	75	3yo+	Twilight Calls
July	Coral Rewards Shaker Handicap	Goodwood	1m 3f 218y	2	75	3yo	Infraad
July	Kincsem Handicap	Goodwood	1m 1f 197y	2	120	3yo	Ciarrai Abu
July	Goodwood Handicap	Goodwood	2m 4f 137y	2	75	3yo+	Defiantly
July	British Stallion Studs EBF Fillies' Handicap	Goodwood	1m 1f 197y	2	85	3yo+ f	Silver Lake
August	Summer Handicap	Goodwood	1m 6f	2	120	3yo+	Hopewell Rock
August	Phase Eight Handicap	Goodwood	7f	2	75	3yo	Ghost Mode
August	Shergar Cup Dash	Ascot	5f	2	85	3yo+	Tuco Salamanca
August	Shergar Cup Stayers	Ascot	1m 7f 209y	2	85	4yo+	Dancing In Paris
August	Shergar Cup Challenge	Ascot	1m 3f 211y	2	85	4yo+	Asgard's Captain
August	Shergar Cup Sprint	Ascot	6f	2	85	3yo	Red Spells Danger
August	Shergar Cup Classic	Ascot	1m 3f 211y	3	85	3yo	Archers Bay
August	Shergar Cup Mile	Ascot	7f 213y	2	100	4yo+	Crown Board
August	Sprint Series Final	Windsor	6f 12y	2	80	3yo+	Trefor
August	Grey Horse Handicap	Newmarket (July)	6f	4	20	3yo+	Havana Blue
August	Great St. Wilfrid Stakes	Ripon	6f	2	100	3yo+	Royal Zabeel
August	Sky Bet Nursery Handicap	York	6f	2	100	2yo	Henley On Thames
August	Mews Hotel Ossett EBF Stallions Nursery Handicap	York	7f	2	100	2yo	Mia Fantasia
August	British EBF Fillies' Handicap	York	7f	2	100	3yo+ f	Machadadorp
August	Sky Bet EBF Fillies' Handicap	York	1m 2f 56y	2	100	3yo+ f	Silver Lake
August	Virgin Bet Every Saturday Money Back Handicap	Goodwood	7f	2	100	3yo+	Forty Years On
September	Schweppes Handicap	Ascot	7f	2	80	3yo+	Thunder Call
**September**	**London Mile Series Final**	**Kempton**	**1m**	**2**	**70**	**3yo+**	**Exposure**
September	Best Odds On The Betfair Exchange Handicap	Haydock	1m 6f	2	100	3yo	Asia Force
September	Old Borough Cup	Haydock	1m 6f	2	100	3yo+	Aegean Prince
September	British Stallion Studs EBF Premier Fillies' Handicap	Doncaster	1m 3f 197y	2	85	3yo+ f	Silver Lake
September	Mallard Handicap	Doncaster	1m 6f 115y	2	70	3yo+	Valedictory
September	Autumn Cup	Newbury	1m 5f 61y	2	60	3yo+	Pearl River
September	Dubai Duty Free Handicap	Newbury	1m 2f	2	60	3yo+	Balzac
October	William Hill Finale Handicap	York	1m 5f 188y	2	100	3yo	Harper Violet
**October**	**London Sprint Series Final**	**Kempton**	**6f**	**2**	**70**	**3yo+**	**Fast Track Harry**
October	Balmoral Handicap	Ascot	1m	2	200	3yo+	Fifth Column
November	November Handicap	Doncaster	1m 3f 197y	2	75	3yo+	Alfred Wincham
**November**	**London Middle Distance Series Final**	**Kempton**	**1m 2f 219y**	**2**	**70**	**3yo+**
**December**	**London Stayers' Series Final**	**Kempton**	**1m 7f 218y**	**2**	**70**	**3yo+**

== Conditions, novices & maidens ==
Criteria for inclusion;

- Class 2 or Class 3 conditions races worth £30,000 or more.
- Novice or maiden races worth £75,000 or more, or worth £20,000 or more and are of historical importance.
- Other conditions, novice or maiden races with a linked article.

Month	Race Name	Racecourse	Status	Distance	Class	Value £K	Age/Sex	2026 winner
**February**	**European Road to the Kentucky Derby Conditions Stakes**	**Kempton**	**Conditions**	**1m**	**3**	**60**	**3yo**	**Hidden Force**
March	Brocklesby Stakes	Doncaster	Novice	5f 3y	2	40	2yo	A Bear Affair
**March**	**British EBF Fillies' Conditions Stakes**	**Kempton**	**Conditions**	**1m**	**2**	**30**	**3yo f**	**Spinning Lizzie**
**March**	**British EBF Conditions Stakes**	**Kempton**	**Conditions**	**1m**	**2**	**30**	**3yo c&g**	**King's Trail**
**April**	**Good Friday Conditions Stakes**	**Chelmsford (Note: Run at Wolverhampton in 2026 due to Chelmsford losing its BHA racing licence)**	**Conditions**	**6f 20y**	**2**	**30**	**3yo**	**Sirius A**
April	Federation Of Bloodstock Agents EBF Conditions Stakes	Newmarket	Conditions	7f	2	30	3yo	Talk Of New York
April	Wood Ditton Maiden Stakes	Newmarket	Maiden	1m	2	20	3yo	Portcullis
**April**	**Cardinal Conditions Stakes**	**Chelmsford (Note: Run at Southwell in 2026 due to Chelmsford losing its BHA racing licence)**	**Conditions**	**1m 14y**	**2**	**30**	**3yo**	**Yazin**
May	John Dunlop EBF Conditions Stakes	Goodwood	Conditions	1m	2	30	3yo	Protection Act
May	Lily Agnes EBF Conditions Stakes	Chester	Conditions	5f 15y	2	50	2yo	Adonius
May	Hilary Needler Trophy	Beverley	Conditions	5f	2	50	2yo f	Crystal Queen
May	Two Year Old Trophy	Beverley	Conditions	5f	2	50	2yo c&g	Matteo
June	Woodcote Stakes	Epsom	Conditions	6f 3y	2	75	2yo	Hickory Lad
June	Queen Alexandra Stakes	Ascot	Conditions	2m 5f 143y	2	120	4yo+	Illinois
July	Betfred St Leger Trial Novice Stakes	Doncaster	Novice	1m 3f 197y	2	80	3yo	Hatteen
July	Alice Keppel Fillies' Stakes	Goodwood	Conditions	5f	2	100	2yo f	Wild Blossom
July	Bentinck Conditions Stakes	Goodwood	Conditions	1m 1f 11y	2	100	4yo+	Galen
August	British Stallion Studs EBF Maiden Stakes	Goodwood	Maiden	7f	2	75	2yo c&g	Rafe's Da Man
August	Convivial Maiden Stakes	York	Maiden	7f	2	100	2yo	Benjamin Hornigold
September	Royal Sussex Regiment EBF Fillies' Conditions Stakes	Goodwood	Conditions	7f	2	40	2yo f	Spirit Tango
September	Full Of Surprises British EBF Fillies' Conditions Stakes	Newbury	Conditions	7f	2	30	2yo f	Sorrengail
September	Haynes, Hanson and Clark Conditions Stakes	Newbury	Conditions	1m	2	30	2yo c&g	Bin Jahwar
September	British EBF £100,000 2yo Fillies' Series Final	Goodwood	Conditions	7f	2	100	2yo f	Poppy Foxy
October	British EBF £100,000 Final	York	Conditions	7f	2	100	2yo c&g	Nakila Sun
October	British Champions Day Two-Year-Old Conditions Stakes	Ascot	Conditions	6f	2	250	2yo	Night In Vegas

== Sales ==
Month	Race Name	Racecourse	Distance	Age/Sex	2026 winner
July	Weatherbys Super Sprint	Newbury	5f 34y	2yo	Zigazig Ah
August	Harry's Half Million By Goffs	York	6f	2yo	Sun Goddess
August	£200,000 Tattersalls Somerville Auction Stakes	Newmarket (July)	6f	2yo	Night In Vegas
September	Weatherbys £300,000 2-Y-O Stakes	Doncaster	6f 111y	2yo	Night In Vegas
October	£200,000 Tattersalls October Auction Stakes	Newmarket	7f	2yo	Night In Vegas

== Discontinued ==
Last Run	Race Name	Racecourse	Distance	Age/Sex
May 1960	Duke of York Handicap	Kempton	1m 2f	3yo
August 1985	Seaton Delaval Stakes	Newcastle	7f	2yo
April 1986	1,000 Guineas Trial Stakes	Salisbury	7f	3yo f
April 1986	2,000 Guineas Trial Stakes	Salisbury	7f	3yo c&g
April 1991	Princess Elizabeth Stakes	Epsom	1m 114y	3yo f
April 1991	Warren Stakes	Epsom	1m 4f 10y	3yo
April 1993	White Rose Stakes	Ascot	1m 2f	3yo
July 1999	Beeswing Stakes	Newcastle	7f	3yo+
April 2003	Thirsk Classic Trial	Thirsk	1m	3yo
July 2005	Golden Daffodil Stakes	Chepstow	1m 2f 36y	3yo+ f
July 2005	Scottish Derby	Ayr	1m 2f	3yo+
April 2009	Easter Stakes	Kempton	1m	3yo c&g
October 2010	Hyperion Stakes	Ascot	7f	2yo
September 2011	Select Stakes	Goodwood	1m 1f 192y	3yo+
September 2012	Stardom Stakes	Goodwood	7f	2yo
April 2017	International Trial Stakes	Lingfield	1m 1y	3yo
April 2022	European Free Handicap	Newmarket	7f	3yo
April 2022	King Richard III Stakes	Leicester	7f	4yo+
May 2022	Buckhounds Stakes	Ascot	1m 3f 211y	4yo+
May 2022	Royal Windsor Stakes	Windsor	1m 31y	3yo+ c&g
May 2022	Fairway Stakes	Newmarket	1m 2f	3yo
May 2022	Leisure Stakes	Windsor	6f 12y	3yo+
June 2022	Midsummer Stakes	Windsor	1m 38y	3yo+
August 2022	Denford Stakes	Newbury	7f	2yo
August 2022	March Stakes	Goodwood	1m 6f	3yo
September 2022	Supreme Stakes	Goodwood	7f	3yo+
June 2023	Ganton Stakes	York	1m	3yo+
August 2023	Sovereign Stakes	Salisbury	1m	3yo+
September 2023	Scarbrough Stakes	Doncaster	5f 3y	2yo+

== Historic races ==
First Run	Race Name	Racecourse	Distance	Age/Sex
1751	Great Subscription Purse	York	4m	4yo+
1757	1200 Guineas Stakes	Newmarket	3m 6½f	5yo
1758	1400 Guineas Stakes	Newmarket	4m 1½f	4yo
1808	Claret Stakes	Newmarket	2m	4yo
1810	Epsom Gold Cup	Epsom	1m 4f	3yo+
1815	Riddlesworth Stakes	Newmarket	1m	3yo
1815	Port Stakes	Newmarket	1m 7½f	4yo
1878	Rous Memorial Stakes	Ascot	1m	3yo+
1888	Lancashire Plate	Manchester	7f / 1m	2yo+
