= Lyric Stakes =

Flat horse race in Great Britain

Lyric Fillies' Stakes
2026
Diamond Rain	Regal Charm	Estissa

Previous years
2025
Sand Gazelle	Rainbows Edge	Charlotte's Web
2024
Verbier	Karmology	Fakhama
2023
Midnight Mile	Mukaddamah	Scenic
2022
Achelois	Poptronic	Pearl Beach
2021
Aristia	Alpine Star	Fooraat

2020-2011
2020
Franconia	Gold Wand	Bighearted
2019
Fanny Logan	Glance	Frankellina
2018
Desert Diamond	Snowy Winter	Stage Name
2017
Entsar	Ajman Princess	Playful Sound
2016
Diploma	Fireglow	Pandora
2015
French Dressing	Crystal Zvezda	Pamona
2014
Tasaday	Raskova	Regardez
2013
Hippy Hippy Shake	Lady Nouf	Ladys First
2012
Barefoot Lady	Emirates Queen	Gathering
2011
Sajjhaa	Myplacelater	Contredanse

2010-2008
2010
Nouriya	Mudaaraah	Totally Ours
2009
High Heeled	Ave	Sweet Lilly
2008
Sweet Lilly	Soft Morning	Makaaseb

The Lyric Stakes is a Listed flat horse race in Great Britain open to mares and fillies aged three years or older. It is run at York over a distance of 1 mile 2 furlongs and 56 yards (2,063 metres), and it is scheduled to take place each year in July.

The race was first run in 2008.

== Records ==
Most successful horse:

- no horse has won this race more than once

Leading jockey (2 wins):

- Frankie Dettori – Sajjhaa (2011), Franconia (2020)
- Kieren Fallon – Hippy Hippy Shake (2013), Tasaday (2014)
- Oisin Murphy - Desert Diamond (2018), Sand Gazelle (2025)

Leading trainer (4 wins):

- John Gosden – French Dressing (2015), Fanny Logan (2019), Franconia (2020), Sand Gazelle (2025)

== Winners ==
Year	Winner	Age	Jockey	Trainer	Time
2008	Sweet Lilly	4	Eddie Creighton	Mick Channon	2:12.58
2009	High Heeled	3	Michael Hills	Barry Hills	2:12.83
2010	Nouriya	3	Ryan Moore	Sir Michael Stoute	2:11.94
2011	Sajjhaa	4	Frankie Dettori	Saeed bin Suroor	2:11.30
2012	Barefoot Lady	4	Tony Hamilton	Richard Fahey	2:07.86
2013	Hippy Hippy Shake	4	Kieren Fallon	Luca Cumani	2:08.23
2014	Tasaday	4	Kieren Fallon	Saeed bin Suroor	2:09.07
2015	French Dressing	3	Robert Havlin	John Gosden	2:06.77
2016	Diploma	3	Ted Durcan	Sir Michael Stoute	2:07.52
2017	Entsar	4	Paul Hanagan	William Haggas	2:11.20
2018	Desert Diamond	3	Oisin Murphy	Sir Michael Stoute	2:18.33
2019	Fanny Logan	3	P. J. McDonald	John Gosden	2:09.75
2020	Franconia	3	Frankie Dettori	John Gosden	2:08.32
2021	Aristia	3	Hayley Turner	Richard Hannon Jr.	2:12.01
2022	Achelois	4	David Probert	Andrew Balding	2:10.98
2023	Midnight Mile	3	Oisin Orr	Richard Fahey	2:08.66
2024	Verbier	4	Rossa Ryan	Ralph Beckett	2:08.37
2025	Sand Gazelle	3	Oisin Murphy	John & Thady Gosden	2:09.12
2026	Diamond Rain	5	William Buick	Charlie Appleby	2:12.79

== See also ==
- Horse racing in Great Britain
- List of British flat horse races
