= Ganton (disambiguation) =

Ganton is a village and civil parish in North Yorkshire, England, UK.

Ganton may also refer to:

== People ==
- Douglas Ganton (fl. 1975–2009), sound engineer
- Ganton Scott (1903–1977) hockey player

== Other ==
- Ganton Golf Club, Ganton, North Yorkshire, England, UK
- Ganton railway station, Ganton, North Yorkshire, England, UK
- Ganton Stakes, a UK horserace
- Ganton Street, London, England, UK

== See also ==
- Saint-Ganton, Brittany, France; a commune
- Gan (disambiguation)
