= Rosemary Stakes =

Flat horse race in Britain

Rosemary Stakes
2026
Alobayyah	Lizzana	Song N Dance

Previous years
2025
Francophone	Hey Boo	Arisaig
2024
Sirona	Fair Point	Spiritual
2023
Coppice	Potapova	Tarawa
2022
Zanbaq	Whitebeam	Crystal Caprice
2021
Soft Whisper	Maamora	Fooraat

2020-2011
2020
Cloak Of Spirits	Bounce The Blues	Tomorrow's Dream
2019
Agincourt	She's Got You	Richmond Avenue
2018
Beshaayir	Queen of Time	Summer Icon
2017
Muffri'Ha	Permission	Tisbutadream
2016
Laugh Aloud	Pirouette	Muffri'Ha
2015
Solar Magic	Black Cherry	Pack Together
2014
Etaab	Belle D'or	Provenance
2013
Zurigha	Igugu	Lanansaak
2012
Chigun	Thistle Bird	Moone's My Name
2011
Dark Promise	Seta	The Shrew

2010-2001
2010
Aspectoflove	Sajjhaa	I'm A Dreamer
2009
Ahla Wasahl	Alsace Lorraine	Headford View
2008
Eva's Request	Mekong Melody	Ghaidaa
2007
Perfect Star	Lady Gloria	Contentious
2006
Wagtail	Grain of Truth	Mamela
2005
Salamanca	Joint Aspiration	Clinet
2004
Tarfah	Golden Island	Mansfield Park
2003
Tadris	Convent Girl	Penny Cross
2002
Welsh Diva	Sonorous	Lady Bear
2001
Mowaadah	Fallen Star	Swift Dispersal

2000-1991
2000
Riberac	Mystify	Peacock Alley
1998
Risque Lady	Confidante	Golden Fortune
1997
Kenmist	Priena	Noisette
1996
Fatefully	Abeyr	Prancing
1995
Hiwaya	Courageous Dancer	Hedera
1994
Sovinista	Mareha	Beaming
1993
Andromaque	Jetbeeah	Cambara
1992
Jdaayel	Mathaayl	Hugging
1991
Able Susan	Caroles Express	Oh Mercy

The Rosemary Stakes is a Listed flat horse race in Great Britain open to mares and fillies aged three years or older. It is run at Newmarket over a distance of 1 mile (1,609 metres), and it is scheduled to take place each year in September.

The race was inaugurated in 1991, and was run at Ascot as a Listed Handicap until 2010.

== Winners ==
Year	Winner	Age	Jockey	Trainer	Time
1991	Able Susan	3	Richard Hills	Geoff Wragg	1:46.01
1992	Jdaayel	3	Michael Roberts	Alec Stewart	1:48.31
1993	Andromaque	3	Steve Raymont	Roger Charlton	1:43.97
1994	Sovinista	3	Michael Roberts	John Dunlop	1:43.56
1995	Hiwaya	3	Richard Hills	Harry Thomson Jones	1:47.99
1996	Fatefully	3	Frankie Dettori	Saeed bin Suroor	1:41.76
1997	Kenmist	3	Kevin Darley	Luca Cumani	1:40.84
1998	Risque Lady	3	Ray Cochrane	Peter Harris	1:41.92
1999	Abandoned due to waterlogging
2000	Riberac	4	Kevin Darley	Mark Johnston	1:41.61
2001	Mowaadah	3	Richard Hills	Alec Stewart	1:48.17
2002	Welsh Diva	3	Richard Quinn	Amanda Perrett	1:41.18
2003	Tadris	3	Richard Hills	Marcus Tregoning	1:39.82
2004	Tarfah	3	Seb Sanders	Gerard Butler	1:42.12
2005 (Note: The 2005 edition was held at Newmarket as Ascot was closed for development)	Salamanca	3	Jamie Spencer	Sylvester Kirk	1:38.57
2006	Wagtail	3	Martin Dwyer	Ed Dunlop	1:40.97
2007	Perfect Star	3	Michael Kinane	Clive Cox	1:42.60
2008	Eva's Request	3	Eddie Creighton	Mick Channon	1:41.09
2009	Ahla Wasahl	3	Ahmed Ajtebi	David Simcock	1:39.82
2010	Aspectoflove	4	Ted Durcan	Saeed bin Suroor	1:42.55
2011	Dark Promise	4	Neil Callan	Roger Varian	1:36.94
2012	Chigun	3	Tom Queally	Sir Henry Cecil	1:36.18
2013	Zurigha	3	Ryan Moore	Richard Hannon Sr.	1:36.94
2014	Etaab	3	Paul Hanagan	William Haggas	1:35.52
2015	Solar Magic	4	Frankie Dettori	John Gosden	1:37.07
2016	Laugh Aloud	3	Robert Havlin	John Gosden	1:35.99
2017	Muffri'Ha	5	Pat Cosgrave	William Haggas	1:39.14
2018	Beshaayir	3	Oisin Murphy	William Haggas	1:37.33
2019	Agincourt	4	Ryan Moore	David O'Meara	1:37.65
2020	Cloak of Spirits	3	Andrea Atzeni	Richard Hannon Jr.	1:35.26
2021	Soft Whisper	3	Frankie Dettori	Saeed bin Suroor	1:34.89
2022	Zanbaq	3	Jim Crowley	Roger Varian	1:37.01
2023	Coppice	3	Frankie Dettori	John & Thady Gosden	1:35.05
2024	Sirona	4	Ryan Moore	David Menuisier	1:39.68
2025	Francophone	4	Joe Fanning	Charlie Johnston	1:37.78
2026	Alobayyah	4	Tom Marquand	William Haggas	1:35.78

== See also ==
- Horse racing in Great Britain
- List of British flat horse races
