= Bosra Sham Stakes =

Flat horse race in Britain

- Class: Listed
- Location: Rowley Mile; Newmarket, England
- Inaugurated: 2003
- Race type: Flat / Thoroughbred
- Sponsor: Irish Stallion Farms
- Website: Newmarket

Race information
- Distance: 6f (1,206 metres)
- Surface: Turf
- Track: Straight
- Qualification: Two-year-old fillies
- Weight: 9 st 0 lb Penalties; 5 lb for group race winners 3 lb for Listed winners
- Purse: £30,000 (2020); 1st: £17,013

Bosra Sham Fillies' Stakes
2026
Siena Storm	Nicely	What A Girl Wants

Previous years
2025
Spicy Marg	Azleet	Splish Splash
2024
It Ain't Two	Kodilicious	Running Queen
2023
Romantic Style	Adaay In Devon	Navassa Island
2022
Matilda Picotte	Queen Olly	Believing
2021
Symphony Perfect	Desert Dreamer	Barbanera

2020-2011
2019
Mild Illusion	Magical Journey	Lady Light
2018
Angelic Light	Chynna	Gypsy Spirit
2017
Alwasmiya	Izzy Bizu	All Out
2016
Spiritual Lady	Spy Ring	Mystic Dawn
2015
Only Mine	Squash	Lady Macapa
2014
Terror	Fligaz	Expensive Date
2013
Cape Factor	Penny Drops	Genuine Quality
2012
Melbourne Memories	Effie	Hoodna
2011
Artistic Jewel	Excelette	Radio Gaga

2010-2003
2010
Sweet Cecily	Question Times	Sharnberry
2009
Queen's Grace	Puff	Tomintoul Singer
2008
Penny's Gift	Qalahari	Albertine Rose
2007
Spinning Lucy	Dubai Princess	Bett's Spirit
2006
Blue Echo	La Presse	Doric Charm
2005
Midris	Gallery Girl	Angus Newz
2004
Bahia Breeze	Nanabanana	Siena Gold
2003
Dowager	Kunda	Doohulla

The Bosra Sham Stakes is a Listed flat horse race in Great Britain open to fillies aged two years only. It is run on the Rowley Mile course at Newmarket over a distance of 6 furlongs (1,206 metres), and it is scheduled to take place each year in late October or early November.

The race was first run in 2003 and is named in honour of the racehorse Bosra Sham.

== Winners ==
Year	Winner	Jockey	Trainer	Time
2003	Dowager	Pat Eddery	Richard Hannon Sr.	1:13.20
2004	Bahia Breeze	Chris Catlin	Rae Guest	1:16.41
2005	Midris	Shane Kelly	D J Daly	1:15.45
2006	Blue Echo	Philip Robinson	Michael Jarvis	1:13.78
2007	Spinning Lucy	Michael Hills	Barry Hills	1:12.56
2008	Penny's Gift	Ryan Moore	Richard Hannon Sr.	1:13.23
2009	Queen's Grace	Steve Drowne	Hughie Morrison	1:14.01
2010	Sweet Cecily	Richard Hughes	Richard Hannon Sr.	1:15.81
2011	Artistic Jewel	Graham Gibbons	Ed McMahon	1:11.95
2012	Melbourne Memories	Paul Hanagan	Clive Cox	1:14.72
2013	Cape Factor	Chris Catlin	Rae Guest	1:15.26
2014	Terror	Jim Crowley	David Simcock	1:14.08
2015	Only Mine	Pat Smullen	Joseph Murphy	1:14.54
2016	Spiritual Lady	Frankie Dettori	Philip McBride	1:11.08
2017	Alwasmiya	Robert Havlin	Simon Crisford	1:11.78
2018	Angelic Light	Leigh Roche	Michael O'Callaghan	1:14.08
2019	Mild Illusion	Josephine Gordon	Jonathan Portman	1:15.05
2020	Ventura Diamond	Silvestre de Sousa	Richard Fahey	1:15.20
2021	Symphony Perfect	Hayley Turner	Richard Hannon Jr.	1:12.64
2022	Matilda Picotte	Declan McDonogh	Kieran Cotter	1:12.03
2023	Romantic Style	Danny Tudhope	Charlie Appleby	1:13.93
2024	It Ain't Two	Harry Davies	Hugo Palmer	1:12.78
2025	Spicy Marg	Hector Crouch	Michael Bell	1:13.49
2026	Siena Storm	Kieran Shoemark	Ed Walker	1:13.36

== See also ==
- Horse racing in Great Britain
- List of British flat horse races
