= John G. Goldsmith =

- Born: 15 August 1909
- Died: 1 January 1972 (aged 62)
- Military career
- Allegiance: United Kingdom
- Branch: Special Operations Executive; British Army
- Rank: Major
- Nickname: Valentin
- Unit: Attorney Circuit
- Commands: Attorney Circuit
- Awards: Distinguished Service Order, Military Cross, Légion d'honneur, Croix de Guerre

Major John Gilbert Goldsmith DSO MC (15 August 1909 – 1 January 1972) was a British agent in the Special Operations Executive (SOE) during the Second World War. The son of a horse dealer, he went on to become a racehorse trainer himself, John Goldsmith grew up as part of the expat community in Paris. He was born in Paris on 15 August 1909 and spent his early childhood at 119 Rue de la Faisanderie, near Avenue Henri Martin, and near to the Polish Embassy. He was educated in French schools, giving him the native French that was to help him in his later SOE work. in the 1920s, John rode in some amateur horse races and was a notable face on the party scene. In 1933 he moved to England, working at The Paddocks near Wantage, Oxfordshire, and he announced himself to the English circuit with a hat trick at Wolverhampton Races in November that year. He met his second wife, Annette Helen Bell Clover (known affectionally as 'Tiny' due to her height) in 1939. She worked as his unofficial secretary in the pre-war days, and they married in April 1940 at Marylebone Registry Office. As Germany progressed through Europe that year, racing wound down, and Jack decided he wanted to join the war effort. He attempted to join the RAF but was rejected due to his age (he was 31 at the time) and had the same response from the army. In December 1940 he closed his yard and took a civilian position at the RAF depot at Milton, Gloucestershire. In 1941 he managed to get accepted into the Royal Armoured Corps and his years of experience driving heavy horse boxes lent itself to manoeuvring the tanks. As a result, he became a tank instructor and was given the rank of (unpaid) Acting Lance Corporal. Both John and his wife wanted a better position for him and via family connections, Jack came to the attention of the newly formed SOE. In December 1941, he received a letter telling him to report to a London address the following day, and it included a 48-hour pass and travel warrant.

He worked for the French section of the organisation, and under the codename 'Valentin' was the organiser of the 'Attorney' circuit near Amiens.

During his time working with SOE, he was captured by the Gestapo, only to manage a daring escape from the Hotel Continentale in Paris whilst in their custody and under armed guard.

Goldsmith's daughter Gaie married the racehorse trainer Fulke Johnson Houghton. Gaie Johnson Houghton bred the racehorse Accidental Agent, named in honour of Goldsmith.
