= Dubai Duty Free Cup =

Flat horse race in Britain

Dubai Duty Free Cup
2026
Catullus	Leading Dancer	Elarak

Previous years
2025
Remmooz	Volterra	Spy Chief
2024
Witness Stand	English Oak	Jumby
2023
Popmaster	Aldaary	Al Mubhir
2022
Sacred	Saleymm	Shine So Bright
2021
Silent Escape	D'bai	Al Suhail

2020-2011
2020
Glorious Journey	Final Song	D'bai
2019
Tabarrak	Sir Thomas Gresham	Salute The Soldier
2018
Mankib	Good Effort	Summer Icon
2017
Tabarrak	Accidental Agent	George William
2016
Aclaim	Fannaan	Accession
2015
Hathal	Ascription	Dark Emerald
2014
Lady Lara	Jallota	Brown Sugar
2013
Tawhid	Enrol	Firebeam
2012
Scarf	Producer	Saigon
2011
Chilworth Lad	Colonial	Joe Packet

2010-2001
2010
Delegator	Sir Gerry	Awzaan
2009
Ashram	Huntdown	Festoso
2008
Kalahari Gold	Il Warrd	Ordnance Row
2007
Hotel du Cap	Asset	Miyasaki
2006
Sleeping Indian	Spinning Queen	Satchem
2005
New Seeker	Vortex	Crimson Sun
2004
Royal Storm	Meshaheer	Lucky Spin
2003
Trade Fair	Lago d'Orta	Membership
2002
Meshaheer	Gateman	Suggestive
2001
Welcome Friend	Patsy's Double	Valentino

2000-1997
2000
Warningford	Umistim	Blue Mountain
1999
Trans Island	Warningford	Tomba
1998
Russian Revival	Kahal	Elshamms
1997
Russian Revival	Hidden Meadow	Centre Stalls

The Dubai Duty Free Cup is a Listed flat horse race in Great Britain open to horses aged three years or older. It is run at Newbury over a distance of 7 furlongs (1,408 metres), and it is scheduled to take place each year in September.

The race was first run in 1997.

== Records ==
Most successful horse (2 wins):

- Russian Revival – (1997, 1998), Tabarrak (2017, 2019)

Leading jockey (4 wins):

- Frankie Dettori – Russian Revival (1997), Meshaheer (2002), Scarf (2012), Hathal (2015)

Leading trainer (6 wins):

- Saeed bin Suroor – Meshaheer (2002), Ashram (2009), Delegator (2010), Scarf (2012), Tawhid (2013), Silent Escape (2021)

== Winners ==
Year	Winner	Age	Jockey	Trainer	Time
1997	Russian Revival	4	Frankie Dettori	John Gosden	1:25.18
1998	Russian Revival	5	Ray Cochrane	John Gosden	1:27.59
1999	Trans Island	4	Olivier Peslier	Ian Balding	1:31.32
2000	Warningford	6	Oscar Urbina	James Fanshawe	1:28.18
2001	Welcome Friend	4	Richard Hughes	Roger Charlton	1:28.27
2002	Meshaheer	3	Frankie Dettori	Saeed bin Suroor	1:23.69
2003	Trade Fair	3	Richard Hughes	Roger Charlton	1:25.30
2004	Royal Storm	5	Darryll Holland	Amanda Perrett	1:24.64
2005	New Seeker	5	Dane O'Neill	Clive Cox	1:22.71
2006	Sleeping Indian	5	Jimmy Fortune	John Gosden	1:24.71
2007	Hotel du Cap	4	Steve Drowne	Geoff Wragg	1:25.03
2008	Kalahari Gold	3	Liam Keniry	Andrew Balding	1:25.35
2009	Ashram	3	Ted Durcan	Saeed bin Suroor	1:23.72
2010	Delegator	4	Ted Durcan	Saeed bin Suroor	1:24.20
2011	Chilworth Lad	3	Richard Hughes	Mick Channon	1:25.06
2012	Scarf	5	Frankie Dettori	Saeed bin Suroor	1:25.53
2013	Tawhid	3	Silvestre De Sousa	Saeed bin Suroor	1:26.47
2014	Lady Lara	3	Luke Morris	Timothy Jarvis	1:29.52
2015	Hathal	3	Frankie Dettori	William Haggas	1:28.29
2016	Aclaim	3	Jamie Spencer	Martyn Meade	1:27.17
2017	Tabarrak	4	Jim Crowley	Richard Hannon Jr.	1:24.50
2018	Mankib	4	Jim Crowley	William Haggas	1:30.39
2019	Tabarrak	6	Jim Crowley	Richard Hannon Jr.	1:24.36
2020	Glorious Journey	5	James Doyle	Charlie Appleby	1:22.51
2021	Silent Escape	3	Oisin Murphy	Saeed bin Suroor	1:24.13
2022	Sacred	4	Tom Marquand	William Haggas	1:25.54
2023	Popmaster	5	Ross Coakley	Ed Walker	1:29.64
2024	Witness Stand	4	Kieran Shoemark	Tom Clover	1:25.07
2025	Remmooz	3	Callum Rodriguez	Owen Burrows	1:27.99
2026	Catullus	3	William Buick	Charlie Appleby	1:23.37

== See also ==
- Horse racing in Great Britain
- List of British flat horse races
