= Boadicea Stakes =

Flat horse race in Britain

Boadicea Stakes
2026
Ruby's Angel	Zen Diva	Magic Basma

Previous years
2025
Dubai Treasure	Hold A Dream	Alfa Kellenic
2024
Rage Of Bamby	Marine Wave	Funny Story
2023
Funny Story	Sophia's Starlight	Silent Words
2022
Azure Blue	Makarova	Pink Crystal
2021
She Do	Gale Force Maya	Adaay To Remember

2020-2011
2020
Jouska	Sunday Star	Jovial
2019
Richenza	Invitational	Bravo Sierra
2018
Perfection	Classical Times	Rebel Surge
2017
Eartha Kitt	Marie Of Lyon	Pixeleen
2016
Kassia	Gravity Flow	Mise En Rose
2015
Mistrusting	Terror	Divine
2014
Inyordreams	Remember	Penny Drops
2013
Mince	Winning Express	The Gold Cheongsam
2012
Swiss Dream	Ultrasonic	Angels Will Fall
2011
Blanche Dubawi	Anne Of Kiev	Rose Blossom

2010-2001
2010
Dever Dream	Wake Up Call	Amitola
2009
Damaniyat Girl	Vitoria	Enact
2008
Ethaara	Medicea Sidera	Bastakiya
2007
Lady Grace	Wid	Angus Newz
2006
Firenze	Ripples Maid	Indian Maiden
2005
Coconut Squeak	Ruby Rocket	Lucky Spin
2004
Ruby Rocket	Ringmoor Down	Paradise Isle
2003
Frizzante	Goldeva	Fanny's Fancy
2002
Lochridge	Birjand	Torosay Spring
2001
Honesty Fair	Damalis	How Do I Know

2000-1999
2000
Honesty Fair	Areydha	Molly Brown
1999
Two Clubs	Fragrant Oasis	Gracious Gift

The Boadicea Stakes is a Listed flat horse race in Great Britain open to mares and fillies aged three years or over. It is run at Newmarket over a distance of 6 furlongs (1,206 metres), and it is scheduled to take place each year in October.

The race was run for the first time in 1999.

== Winners ==
Year	Winner	Age	Jockey	Trainer	Time
1999	Two Clubs	3	Kieren Fallon	William Jarvis	1:14.80
2000	Honesty Fair	3	Dean Mernagh	Jeremy Glover	1:13.45
2001	Honesty Fair	4	Richard Hughes	Jeremy Glover	1:13.67
2002	Lochridge	3	Martin Dwyer	Ian Balding	1:10.59
2003	Frizzante	4	Jamie Spencer	James Fanshawe	1:13.28
2004	Ruby Rocket	3	Steve Drowne	Hughie Morrison	1:13.46
2005	Coconut Squeak	3	Micky Fenton	Stef Liddiard	1:13.27
2006	Firenze	5	Jamie Spencer	James Fanshawe	1:12.98
2007	Lady Grace	3	Michael Hills	William Haggas	1:13.39
2008	Ethaara	3	Richard Hills	William Haggas	1:10.71
2009	Damaniyat Girl	3	Frankie Dettori	William Haggas	1:12.30
2010	Dever Dream	3	Ryan Moore	William Haggas	1:11.34
2011	Blanche Dubawi	3	Richard Hughes	Noel Quinlan	1:11.07
2012	Swiss Dream	4	Liam Keniry	David Elsworth	1:13.60
2013	Mince	4	Johnny Murtagh	Roger Charlton	1:10.52
2014	Inyordreams	3	Frankie Dettori	James Given	1:10.52
2015	Mistrusting	3	William Buick	Charlie Appleby	1:12.67
2016	Kassia	3	Graham Lee	Mick Channon	1:11.04
2017	Eartha Kitt	3	Richard Kingscote	Tom Dascombe	1:10.52
2018	Perfection	3	Frankie Dettori	John Gosden	1:10.96
2019	Richenza	4	Harry Bentley	Ralph Beckett	1:14.25
2020	Jouska	3	Rob Hornby	Henry Candy	1:13.04
2021	She Do	3	Callum Shepherd	Roger Varian	1:11.59
2022	Azure Blue	3	David Egan	Michael Dods	1:10.39
2023	Funny Story	3	Rossa Ryan	Ralph Beckett	1:12.24
2024	Rage Of Bamby	4	Charles Bishop	Eve Johnson Houghton	1:12.49
2025	Dubai Treasure	4	Oisin Murphy	Saeed bin Suroor	1:10.12
2026	Ruby's Angel	3	Saffie Osborne	Hugo Palmer	1:11.86

== See also ==
- Horse racing in Great Britain
- List of British flat horse races
