= Esher Cup =

Flat horse race in Britain

Esher Cup Handicap
- Class: Handicap
- Location: Sandown Park; Esher, England
- Race type: Flat / Thoroughbred
- Sponsor: Bet365
- Website: Sandown Park

Race information
- Distance: 1m (1,609m)
- Surface: Turf
- Track: Right-handed
- Qualification: Three-year-olds
- Weight: Handicap
- Purse: £45,000 (2025); 1st: £23,193

Esher Cup
2022
Wanees	City Runner	Blue Trail

Previous years
2021
Naamoos	Buxted Too	Without Revenge

2020-2011
2019
Masaru	Migration	Loch Ness Monster
2018
Merlin Magic	Vintager	Kings Shield
2017
Atty Persse	Mucho Applause	The Grape Escape
2016
Czabo	Midhmaar	Chief Whip
2015
Mutarakez	Shaakis	Plymouth Sound
2014
What About Carlo	End of Line	First Flight
2013
Haafaguinea	Market Town	Yarroom
2012
Grey Mirage	Kid Suitor	Graphic
2011
Tazahum	Captain Bertie	Star Surprise

2010-2001
2010
Fallen Idol	Karaka Jack	Huygens
2009
Racketeer	Thief Of Time	Midnight Cruiser
2008
Commander Cave	Unbreak My Heart	Cobo Bay
2007
Desert Dew	Aegean Prince	Zaham
2006
Yarqus	King's Head	Direct Debit
2005
Prince Samos	Notability	Enforcer
2004
Barathea Dreams	Appalachian Trail	Momtic
2003
Grand Passion	Interceptor	New Wish
2002
Common World	Pentecost	Kasamba

2000-1991
2000
Pipssalio	Everest	Tumbleweed Tor
1999
Tiger Talk	Balsox	Badagara
1998
Florazi	Wuxi Venture	Indian Missile
1997
Amyas	Burning Truth	No More Pressure
1996
Sorbie Tower	Forest Robin	Warning Reef
1995
Holtye	Ihtiram	Ela-Aristokrati
1994
Stash The Cash	Cajun Cadet	Chickawicka
1993
Eastern Memories	New Capricorn	Embankment
1992
Irek	The Power Of One	Sharpitor
1991
Rapid Coracle	Fraar	Loki

1990-1988
1990
Field Glass	Two Left Feet	Ruling Passion
1989
Top-Boot	Tops All	Azeb
1988
Raykour	Iran Scam	Apache

The Esher Cup is a flat handicap horse race in Great Britain open to horses aged three years old. It is run at Sandown Park over a distance of 1 mile (1,609 metres), and it is scheduled to take place each year in late April.

== Records ==
Leading jockey (6 wins):

- Pat Eddery – Astrocan (1971), Free State (1976), Atlantic Boy (1980), Top-Boot (1989), Holtye (1995), Florazi (1998)

Leading trainer (5 wins):

- Richard Hannon Sr. - Rapid Coracle (1991), Eastern Memories (1993), Stash The Cash (1994), Prince Samos (2005), Commander Cave (2008)

== Winners ==
Year	Winner	Weight	Jockey	Trainer	Time
1906	Kolo	7-05	Cecil Escott	Alf Sadler Jr.
1907	Doryanthes	7-12	George McCall	John Watson
1908	Littledale	8-05	Lucien Lyne	Thomas Leader
1909	Sealed Orders	7-07	Frank Wootton	John Brewer
1910	Celluloid	6-07	Charles Ringstead	Samuel Pickering
1911	Marechal Strozzi	7-00	Albert Bowley	George Butchers
1912	Le Touquet	7-08	Albert Whalley	Alf Sadler Jr.
1913	Evening Pleasure	6-08	Ernest Huxley	Frank Hartigan	1:55.00
1914	Screamer	7-04	Herbert Robbins	Frank Hartigan	1:50.80
1915	Vizier	6-13	John Dick	Richard Dawson	1:48.80
1916-18	No Race
1919	Stand To	8-05	Joe Childs	Capt. Robert Dewhurst
1920	Roman Bachelor	8-12	George Smith	Peter Gilpin
1921	Abandoned due to a National Coal Strike
1922	Silver Urn	6-12	Bobby Jones	Atty Persse	1:49.80
1923	Boscombe	7-05	Bobby Jones	Gordon Sadler	1:54.40
1924	Cockpit	7-13	Steve Donoghue	Samuel Pickering	1:52.60
1925	Peeping Tom	6-13	Henry Leach	Samuel Pickering	1:49.00
1926	Granada	8-04	Henri Jelliss	Basil Jarvis	1:51.60
1927	Valois	8-08	Charlie Elliott	Jack Jarvis	1:47.80
1928	Sea Crag	7-04	Joseph Dines	Sam Darling	1:45.80
1929	Ghost Train	8-02	Cecil Ray	Peter Thrale	1:45.60
1930	Nick Of Time	7-08	Freddie Fox	Frank Hartigan	1:45.00
1931	Light O' Love	8-02	Harry Wragg	Jack Jarvis	1:50.80
1932	Leighon	8-07	Bobby Jones	Joseph Lawson	1:55.00
1933	Blue Boy	8-11	Sir Gordon Richards	Martin Hartigan	1:45.00
1934	Hidalgo	8-03	Cliff Richards	Martin Hartigan	1:51.20
1935	Ankaret	8-07	George Nicholl	Fred Butters	1:48.60
1936	Silver Crest	8-04	Eph Smith	Jack Jarvis	1:50.80
1937	Flag Of Truce	7-10	Sir Gordon Richards	Joseph Lawson	1:51.60
1938	Zoltan	8-00	Michael Beary	Jack Jarvis	1:44.60
1939	Winning Lot	7-13	Michael Beary	Harry Cottrill	1:45.40
1940-46	No Race
1947	Patron Saint	6-12	Tommy Sidebotham	Richard Perryman	1:51.40
1948	Asman-Tara	7-08	Eph Smith	Sam Armstrong	1:43.40
1949	Spy Legend	9-03	Eph Smith	Rufus Beasley	1:43.60
1950	Kelling	6-12	Ray Reader	Alec Waugh	1:42.00
1951	Master Rocky	7-11	Billy Cook	Walter Nightingall	1:45.20
1952	Nightman	7-12	Manny Mercer	Harry Wragg	1:46.20
1953	Red Wine	8-05	Frank Barlow	Henri Jelliss	1:42.60
1954	Waymouth Bay	7-05	Ray Reader	Noel Cannon	1:43.80
1955	Tudor Jinks	8-00	Jock Wilson	Matt Feakes	1:43.40
1956	Almoner	8-04	Doug Smith	Geoffrey Brooke	1:45.40
1957	Petersfield	9-00	Scobie Breasley	Staff Ingham	1:41.80
1958	Lynch Law	8-04	Manny Mercer	Jack Jarvis	1:50.20
1959	Rockamour	6-12	Bobby Elliott	George Todd	1:51.60
1960	Fulshaw Cross	8-02	Scobie Breasley	Harold Wallington	1:42.40
1961	Storymount	8-03	Wally Swinburn	Peter Nelson	1:49.00
1962	Bucks King	8-03	Willie Snaith	Bill Holden	1:44.40
1963	Gallant Phoenix	8-06	Scobie Breasley	John Benstead	1:47.20
1964	Pan's Surprise	8-10	Jimmy Lindley	Arthur Budgett	1:54.80
1965	Toffee Nose	8-01	Duncan Keith	Walter Nightingall	1:43.20
1966	Polar Boy	7-08	Denis Letherby	Willie Stephenson	1:53.80
1967	Follywise	8-00	Brian Jago	Ron Smyth	1:43.60
1968	Private Side	7-04	Des Cullen	Humphrey Cottrill	1:43.40
1969	Eldo	8-13	John Gorton	Doug Smith	1:49.00
1970	Mon Plaisir	8-00	Geoff Lewis	Harold Wallington	1:48.50
1971	Astrocan	7-10	Pat Eddery	Harvey Leader	1:49.60
1972	Dawn Review	8-02	Robert Edmondson	Sir Mark Prescott	1:43.60
1973 (Note: The 1973 race was run at Kempton Park)	Flambeau	8-01	Geoff Lewis	Bruce Hobbs	1:42.08
1974	Wanlockhead	9-00	Jimmy Lindley	Robert Armstrong	1:43.61
1975	Chil The Kite	8-09	Geoff Lewis	Bruce Hobbs	1:46.29
1976	Free State	8-09	Pat Eddery	Peter Walwyn	1:41.76
1977	Bona-Mia	8-00	Paul Cook	Tommy Gosling	1:43.01
1978	Rhyme Royal	8-07	Willie Carson	Dick Hern	1:49.83
1979	Marquee Universal	8-12	Steve Cauthen	Barry Hills	1:51.99
1980	Atlantic Boy	8-03	Pat Eddery	Michael Stoute	1:41.76
1981	Beeleigh	7-09	Tony McGlone	Neville Callaghan	1:45.37
1982	Spanish Pool	9-04	Brian Taylor	Jeremy Hindley	1:40.05
1983	So True	9-02	Philip Waldron	Toby Balding	1:53.38
1984	Bastille	8-03	Richard Fox	John Dunlop	1:41.55
1985	Prince Lyph	8-08	Walter Swinburn	Michael Stoute	1:42.74
1986	Swift Trooper	8-05	Ray Cochrane	Roger Williams	1:50.69
1987	Bronzewing	7-12	Willie Carson	John Dunlop	1:41.84
1988	Raykour	9-05	Ray Cochrane	Luca Cumani	1:45.32
1989	Top-Boot	9-07	Pat Eddery	John Dunlop	1:51.74
1990	Field Glass	9-02	Walter Swinburn	Michael Stoute	1:40.61
1991	Rapid Coracle	8-07	Brian Rouse	Richard Hannon Sr.	1:42.46
1992	Irek	8-05	Michael Roberts	Lord Huntingdon	1:45.27
1993	Eastern Memories	8-08	D Gibbs	Richard Hannon Sr.	1:46.66
1994	Stash The Cash	8-03	Frankie Dettori	Richard Hannon Sr.	1:50.58
1995	Holtye	8-01	Pat Eddery	Henry Cecil	1:41.42
1996	Sorbie Tower	9-03	Ray Cochrane	Gay Kelleway	1:42.33
1997	Amyas	8-13	Michael Hills	Barry Hills	1:46.00
1998	Florazi	9-04	Pat Eddery	John Dunlop	1:51.38
1999	Tiger Talk	8-11	Michael Hills	Barry Hills	1:50.68
2000	Pipssalio	7-10	Franny Norton	Jamie Poulton	1:53.08
2001	Abandoned due to waterlogging
2002	Common World	9-02	Eddie Ahern	Gerard Butler	1:45.56
2003	Grand Passion	9-01	Darryll Holland	Geoff Wragg	1:42.41
2004	Barathea Dreams	7-12	Jimmy Quinn	Stan Moore	1:46.04
2005	Prince Samos	8-04	Ryan Moore	Richard Hannon Sr.	1:43.22
2006 (dh)	King's Head; Yarqus	8-07; 8-04	Philip Robinson; Martin Dwyer	Michael Jarvis; Clive Brittain	1:43.33
2007	Desert Dew	9-04	Michael Hills	Barry Hills	1:42.74
2008	Commander Cave	8-08	Richard Hughes	Richard Hannon Sr.	1:45.02
2009	Racketeer	8-04	Nicky Mackay	John Gosden	1:42.92
2010	Fallen Idol	8-12	William Buick	John Gosden	1:44.60
2011	Tazahum	9-03	Richard Hills	Michael Stoute	1:43.56
2012	Grey Mirage	8-07	Silvestre De Sousa	Marco Botti	1:54.30
2013	Haafaguinea	9-04	Adam Kirby	Clive Cox	1:45.32
2014	What About Carlo	9-02	Jimmy Fortune	Eve Johnson Houghton	1:48.42
2015	Mutarakez	8-09	Frankie Dettori	Brian Meehan	1:43.99
2016	Czabo	8-10	Silvestre de Sousa	Mick Channon	1:45.19
2017	Atty Persse	9-01	James Doyle	Roger Charlton	1:45.39
2018	Merlin Magic	8-10	Silvestre de Sousa	David Elsworth	1:45.16
2019	Masaru	9-07	Ryan Moore	Richard Hannon Jr.	1:43.94
	no race 2020 (Note: The 2020 running was cancelled because of the COVID-19 pandemic in the United Kingdom)
2021	Naamoos	9-07	Ben Curtis	Mark Johnston	1:46.52
2022	Wanees	8-12	Jim Crowley	Charles Hills	1:46.25
2023	Abandoned due to unsafe ground
2024	Hand Of God	8-12	Ryan Moore	Harry Charlton	1:45.48
2025	Fifth Column	9-00	William Buick	John & Thady Gosden	1:45.35
2026	Laureate Crown	9-02	Oisin Murphy	Hugo Palmer	1:43.58

== See also ==
- Horse racing in Great Britain
- List of British flat horse races
