= Royal Windsor Stakes =

Flat horse race in Britain

Royal Windsor Stakes
2022
Modern News	Tempus	Bell Rock

Previous years
2021
Solid Stone	Stormy Antarctic	Qaysar

2020-2011
2019
Bye Bye Hong Kong	Oh This Is Us	Breton Rock
2018
Arod	Oh This Is Us	Khafoo Shememi
2015
Shifting Power	Complicit	Intransigent
2014
Ocean Tempest	Fencing	Fire Ship
2013
Guest of Honour	Don't Call Me	Montiridge
2012
Tullius	Skilful	Memory Cloth
2011
Side Glance	The Cheka	Penitent

2010-2000
2010
Bushman	Ordnance Row	Vitznau
2009
Ordnance Row	Pinpoint	Icesolator
2008
Ordnance Row	Dunelight	Metropolitan Man
2007
Army of Angels	Take A Bow	Levera
2006
Home Affairs	Momtic	Take A Bow
2005
Fort Dignity	Take A Bow	Pentecost
2004
Putra Pekan	Ancient World	Excelsius
2003
Right Approach	Atavus	Blatant
2002
Father Thames	Bourgainville	Wannabe Around
2001
Swallow Flight	Summer View	Blue Mountain
2000
Swallow Flight	Kalanisi	Showboat

The Royal Windsor Stakes is a Listed flat horse race in Great Britain open to colts and geldings aged three years or older. It is run at Windsor over a distance of 1 mile and 31 yards (1,638 metres), and it is scheduled to take place each year in May.

The race was first run in 2000.

== Winners ==
Year	Winner	Age	Jockey	Trainer	Time
2000	Swallow Flight	4	Michael Roberts	Geoff Wragg	1:42.00
2001	Swallow Flight	5	Darryll Holland	Geoff Wragg	1:44.10
2002	Father Thames	4	Kieren Fallon	James Fanshawe	1:47.80
2003	Right Approach	4	Kieren Fallon	Michael Stoute	1:46.96
2004	Putra Pekan	6	Philip Robinson	Michael Jarvis	1:50.88
2005	Fort Dignity	4	Johnny Murtagh	Michael Stoute	1:40.78
2006	Home Affairs	4	Richard Hughes	Michael Stoute	1:40.81
2007	Army of Angels	5	Frankie Dettori	Saeed bin Suroor	1:45.59
2008	Ordnance Row	5	Ryan Moore	Richard Hannon Sr.	1:41.10
2009	Ordnance Row	6	Richard Hughes	Richard Hannon Sr.	1:42.72
2010	Bushman	6	Kieren Fallon	David Simcock	1:46.96
2011	Side Glance	4	Jimmy Fortune	Andrew Balding	1:42.24
2012	Tullius	4	Jimmy Fortune	Andrew Balding	1:46.42
2013	Guest of Honour	4	Martin Harley	Marco Botti	1:42.69
2014	Ocean Tempest	5	Adam Kirby	John Ryan	1:44.23
2015	Shifting Power	4	Richard Hughes	Richard Hannon Jr.	1:42.89
2016	Abandoned due to slippery ground
2017	Abandoned due to slippery ground
2018	Arod	7	Oisin Murphy	David Simcock	1:41.52
2019	Bye Bye Hong Kong	3	Silvestre de Sousa	Andrew Balding	1:44.72
	no race 2020 (Note: The 2020 running was cancelled because of the COVID-19 pandemic in the United Kingdom)
2021	Solid Stone	5	Ryan Moore	Michael Stoute	1:41.49
2022	Modern News	4	William Buick	Charlie Appleby	1:39.68

== See also ==
- Horse racing in Great Britain
- List of British flat horse races
