= Midsummer Stakes =

Flat horse race in Britain

Midsummer Stakes
2022
My Oberon	Modern News	Perotto

Previous years
2021
Century Dream	Top Rank	Bounce The Blues

2020-2011
2020
Pogo	Urban Icon	Foxtrot Lady
2019
Matterhorn	New Graduate	Khafoo Shememi
2018
Zhui Feng	Oh This Is Us	Gabrial
2017
Morando	Stormy Antarctic	Here Comes When
2016
Gabrial	Captain Cat	Clotilde
2015
Kodi Bear	Short Squeeze	Gabrial
2014
Custom Cut	Baltic Knight	Empire Storm
2013
French Navy	Emell	Lockwood
2012
Thistle Bird	Coupe de Ville	Highland Knight
2011
Nationalism	The Rectifier	Dux Scholar

2010-2004
2010
The Rectifier	Aldovrandi	Party Doctor
2009
Without A Prayer	Premio Loco	Laa Rayb
2008
Dunelight	Ordnance Row	Banknote
2007
Winged Cupid	Babodana	Vanderlin
2006
Librettist	Prince of Light	Humungous
2005
Hazyview	Welcome Stranger	Kamakiri
2004
Gateman	Shot To Fame	Vanderlin

The Midsummer Stakes was a Listed flat horse race in Great Britain open to horses aged three years or older. It was run at Windsor over a distance of 1 mile and 31 yards (1,638 metres), and took place each year in June.

The race was first run in 2004. It was removed from the Pattern and Listed race programme in 2023.

== Records ==
Leading jockey (2 wins):

- Jamie Spencer – Hazyview (2005), Custom Cut (2014)
- Kieran Shoemark - Pogo (2020), Century Dream (2021)

Leading trainer (3 wins):

- Saeed bin Suroor – Librettist (2006), Winged Cupid (2007), French Navy (2013)

== Winners ==
Year	Winner	Age	Jockey	Trainer	Time
2004	Gateman	7	Keith Dalgleish	Mark Johnston	1:40.68
2005	Hazyview	4	Jamie Spencer	Neville Callaghan	1:46.40
2006	Librettist	4	Frankie Dettori	Saeed bin Suroor	1:40.27
2007	Winged Cupid	4	Kerrin McEvoy	Saeed bin Suroor	1:47.61
2008	Dunelight	5	Ian Mongan	Clive Cox	1:41.40
2009	Without A Prayer	4	Richard Kingscote	Ralph Beckett	1:42.15
2010	The Rectifier	3	Micky Fenton	Stef Higgins	1:42.45
2011	Nationalism	4	Robert Havlin	John Gosden	1:40.19
2012	Thistle Bird	4	James Doyle	Roger Charlton	1:41.25
2013	French Navy	5	Adam Kirby	Saeed bin Suroor	1:39.81
2014	Custom Cut	5	Jamie Spencer	David O'Meara	1:42.20
2015	Kodi Bear	3	Oisin Murphy	Clive Cox	1:40.49
2016	Gabrial	7	David Nolan	Richard Fahey	1:46.72
2017	Morando	4	Jack Mitchell	Roger Varian	1:43.92
2018	Zhui Feng	5	Martin Dwyer	Amanda Perrett	1:46.73
2019	Matterhorn	4	Franny Norton	Mark Johnston	1:39.47
2020	Pogo	4	Kieran Shoemark	Charles Hills	1:40.51
2021	Century Dream	7	Kieran Shoemark	Simon & Ed Crisford	1:39.79
2022	My Oberon	4	Stevie Donohoe	William Haggas	1:40.19

== See also ==
- Horse racing in Great Britain
- List of British flat horse races
