= Bryn Crossley =

Welsh jockey

Bryn Gareth Crossley (3 August 1958 – 7 January 2018) was a Welsh jockey who competed in Flat racing. He was British flat racing Champion Apprentice in the 1981 season and rode over 200 winners in total in a career lasting from 1976 to 1993.

Crossley was born in Prestatyn and began his career in racing as an apprentice jockey at the stable of Robert Amstrong in Newmarket. He rode his first winner at Yarmouth in 1979. He subsequently worked for Geoff Huffer and was at Huffer's stable when he won the 1981 apprentice championship with 45 winners. He gained his only Group race win when Nepula won the Group 3 Fillies' Mile in 1993. He also gained major handicap victories in the Lincoln Handicap and Old Newton Cup. Crossley retired in 1993 having ridden 222 winners during his career. The best horse he rode was possibly the 1983 Epsom Derby winner, Teenoso, who he partnered in a maiden race at Haydock Park earlier in the 1983 season.

Crossley died in January 2018, aged 59, after suffering a seizure at his home in Spain.
