= Ganton Stakes =

Discontinued flat horse race in Britain

Ganton Stakes
2023
Chichester	Shining Blue	Azano

Previous years
2022
Valiant Prince	Art Du Val	Bell Rock
2021
Space Traveller	Azano	Duke Of Hazzard

2020-2012
2019
Happy Power	Wadilsafa	Oh This Is Us
2018
Sovereign Debt	Arod	Another Touch
2017
Arabian Hope	Golden Stunner	Thikriyaat
2016
Mutakayyef	Sovereign Debt	Muwaary
2015
Top Notch Tonto	Gabrial	Fire Ship
2014
Guest of Honour	Fencing	Custom Cut
2013
Baltic Knight	Quick Wit	Stipulate
2012
Tullius	Doncaster Rover	Dance And Dance

The Ganton Stakes was a Listed flat horse race in Great Britain open to horses aged three years or older. It is run at York over a distance of 7 furlongs and 192 yards (1,584 metres), and was scheduled to take place each year in June.

The race was first run in 2012. It was removed from the pattern race programme by the British Horseracing Authority in 2024.

== Winners ==
Year	Winner	Age	Jockey	Trainer	Time
2012	Tullius	4	Jimmy Fortune	Andrew Balding	1:43.00
2013	Baltic Knight	3	Richard Hughes	Richard Hannon Sr.	1:37.48
2014	Guest of Honour	5	Martin Harley	Marco Botti	1:38.45
2015	Top Notch Tonto	5	Silvestre de Sousa	Brian Ellison	1:37.50
2016	Mutakayyef	5	Pat Cosgrave	William Haggas	1:39.31
2017	Arabian Hope	3	Josephine Gordon	Saeed bin Suroor	1:37.29
2018	Sovereign Debt	9	James Sullivan	Ruth Carr	1:37.93
2019	Happy Power	3	Silvestre de Sousa	Andrew Balding	1:39.61
	no race 2020 (Note: The 2020 running was cancelled because of the COVID-19 pandemic in the United Kingdom)
2021	Space Traveller	5	Daniel Tudhope	Richard Fahey	1:38.63
2022	Valiant Prince	4	James Doyle	Charlie Appleby	1:35.77
2023	Chichester	6	Richard Kingscote	Keith Dalgleish	1:36.58

== See also ==
- Horse racing in Great Britain
- List of British flat horse races
