= Haydock Park Racecourse =

UK horse racing track

Haydock Park
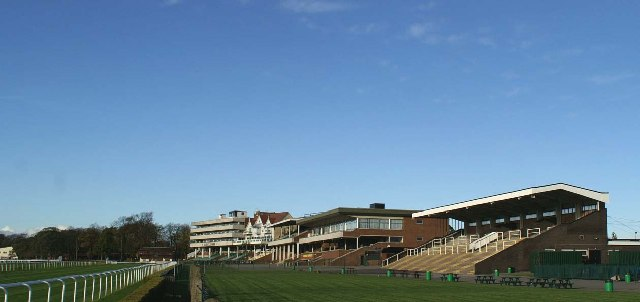
- The stands in 2005
- Interactive map of Haydock Park
- Location: Newton-le-Willows, Merseyside WA12 0HQ
- Coordinates: 53°28′41″N 2°37′19″W
- Owned by: Jockey Club Racecourses
- Screened on: Racing TV
- Course type: Flat; National Hunt

Haydock Park Racecourse is a racecourse in Merseyside, North West England. The racecourse is set in an area of parkland bounded by the towns of Haydock to the west, Ashton-in-Makerfield to the north, Golborne to the east and Newton-le-Willows to the south. Horse racing had been run in Newton for many years (the great racemare Queen of Trumps won at Newton in 1836), and the venue was also used for hare coursing in the 1880s. The current racecourse was opened in 1899. Much of the course's early development was overseen by Sydney Sandon, who served as course secretary, chairman and managing director in the early 20th century.

== Facilities ==
The track is a mostly flat left-handed oval of around 1 mile 5 furlongs with a slight rise on the four and a half furlong run-in. An extension or "chute" to the straight allows sprints of up to six furlongs to be run on a straight course. There are courses for flat racing and National Hunt racing.

The facilities include a champagne bar and has an airstrip that can be used as a small airport for light aircraft.

It was awarded Racecourse of the Year in 1998 and 2000.

== Notable races ==
Month	DOW	Race Name	Type	Grade	Distance	Age/Sex
January	Saturday	Altcar Novices' Chase	Chase	Grade 2	2m 5f	5yo +
January	Saturday	Rossington Main Novices' Hurdle	Hurdle	Grade 2	2m	4yo +
January	Saturday	Peter Marsh Chase	Chase	Grade 2	3m 1f	5yo +
February	Saturday	Rendlesham Hurdle	Hurdle	Grade 2	3m	4yo +
February	Saturday	Prestige Novices' Hurdle	Hurdle	Grade 2	3m	4yo +
February	Saturday	Grand National Trial	Chase	Prem Hcap	3m 4f	5yo +
February	Saturday	Victor Ludorum Juvenile Hurdle	Hurdle	Conditions	2m	4yo only
May	Saturday	Swinton Handicap Hurdle	Hurdle	Prem Hcap	2m	4yo +
May	Saturday	Spring Trophy	Flat	Listed	7f	3yo +
May	Saturday	Silver Bowl	Flat	Handicap	1m	3yo only
May	Saturday	Temple Stakes	Flat	Group 2	5f	3yo +
June	Saturday	Sandy Lane Stakes	Flat	Group 2	6f	3yo only
June	Saturday	Lester Piggott Stakes	Flat	Group 3	1m 3f 200y	4yo + f
June	Saturday	Achilles Stakes	Flat	Listed	5f	3yo +
June	Saturday	John of Gaunt Stakes	Flat	Group 3	7f	4yo +
July	Saturday	Old Newton Cup	Flat	Handicap	1m 3f 200y	4yo +
July	Saturday	Lancashire Oaks	Flat	Group 2	1m 3f 200y	3yo + f
August	Saturday	Dick Hern Fillies' Stakes	Flat	Conditions	1m	3yo + f
August	Saturday	Rose of Lancaster Stakes	Flat	Group 3	1m 2f 95y	3yo +
September	Saturday	Ascendant Stakes	Flat	Conditions	1m	2yo only
September	Saturday	Haydock Sprint Cup	Flat	Group 1	6f	3yo +
September	Saturday	Superior Mile	Flat	Group 3	1m	3yo +
November	Saturday	Betfair Stayers' Handicap Hurdle	Hurdle	Grade 3	3m ½f	4yo +
November	Saturday	Betfair Chase	Chase	Grade 1	3m 1½f	5yo +
December	Saturday	Tommy Whittle Chase	Chase	Handicap	3m	4yo +

== Bibliography ==
- West, Julian, ed. (2000). Travelling The Turf. Hexham, Northumberland: Kensington West. ISBN 978-1-902990-00-2.
