= Amanda Perrett =

English horse-racing trainer

Amanda Perrett is an English horse-racing trainer who runs Coombelands Racing Stables in Pulborough, West Sussex. Since she took over Coombelands in 1996 from her father, former champion trainer Guy Harwood, Amanda has trained over six hundred and fifty winners and generated over eight million in prize money. She is married to former jockey Mark Perrett.

== Major wins ==
France

- Prix de la Forêt - (1) - Indian Lodge (2000)
- Prix du Moulin de Longchamp - (1) - Indian Lodge (2000)
