= David Probert =

Welsh jockey (born 1988)

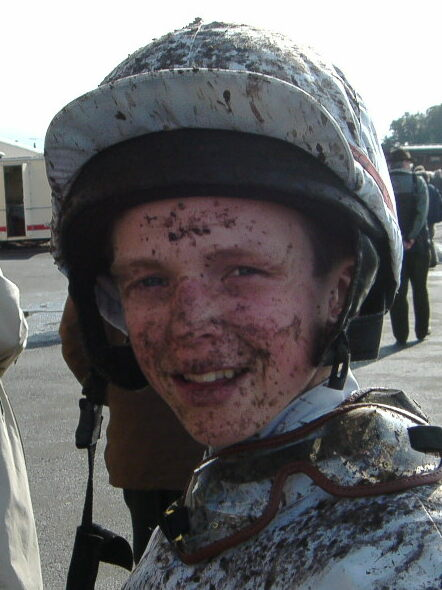
- David Probert at Warwick Racecourse, 2009

Personal information
- Born: 5 December 1988 Bargoed, Wales
- Occupation: Jockey

Horse racing career
- Sport: Horse racing

Racing awards
- British flat racing Champion Apprentice (2008); All-weather champion jockey (2021/22); Welsh flat racing jockey of the year (2022)

Significant horses
- Highland Knight, Dancing Star, Tip Two Win, Sandrine, King's Lynn

David Probert (born 5 December 1988) is a Welsh jockey who was joint British flat racing Champion Apprentice in 2008 and all-weather champion jockey in 2021/22.

== Early life ==
Probert was born in Bargoed, Wales, attended Ysgol Gyfun Cwm Rhymni, a Welsh language school, and competed in pony racing around Wales. At sixteen, he attended the British Racing School in Newmarket.

== Riding career ==
After completing a course at the British Racing School, Probert went to work at the yard of trainer Andrew Balding at Kingsclere. As an apprentice jockey, he rode his first winner on 3 December 2007, when Mountain Pass won a race at Wolverhampton for Welsh trainer John Llewellyn. In 2008, he rode 50 winners and shared the British flat racing Champion Apprentice title with fellow Kingsclere apprentice William Buick.

In 2012, he won his first Group race, riding Highland Knight for Balding in the Group 2 Oettingen-Rennen in Baden-Baden, Germany. After the race, Probert said: "This must be the best horse I have ever ridden, he was terrific today and I never had a moment's worry." The following year, he picked up the Group 3 Darley Stakes at Newmarket on the same horse.

June 2014 saw Probert become the youngest Welshman to ride in the Derby, finishing eleventh on 50/1 outsider Impulsive Moment for Balding. The same month, he secured his first win at Royal Ascot, in the Britannia Stakes on the Balding-trained Born in Bombay Later in the year, he won the Oettingen-Rennen again for Balding on Here Comes When He achieved his first century in 2014, ending the year on 107 winners.

In July 2016, Probert rode the three-year-old filly Dancing Star, trained by Balding, to win two heritage handicaps, one at Newmarket and then the Stewards Cup at Goodwood. Dancing Star was the first filly to win the Stewards' Cup since Lochsong, trained by Balding's father Ian Balding, in 1992. Dancing Star was a granddaughter of Lochangel, a half-sister to Lochsong.

Probert rode his 1,000th winner at Lingfield in June 2020. In April 2022 he was crowned all-weather champion jockey for the 2021/22 season. At the end of the 2022 flat season, during which he secured five Group 2 victories, he won the Welsh flat racing jockey of the year award. He rode his 1,500th winner at Wolverhampton in November 2023.

As of June 2025, Probert had won 21 Group 2 and 3 races, in Great Britain, Germany, Qatar and Italy. He was yet to win a Group 1 race, the closest he had come being second place on 50/1 outsider Tip Two Win in the 2018 2000 Guineas Stakes and second place on 150/1 chance Hoo Ya Mal in the 2022 Epsom Derby.
