= Awzaan =

British-bred Thoroughbred racehorse

- Sire: Alhaarth
- Grandsire: Unfuwain
- Dam: Nufoos
- Damsire: Zafonic
- Sex: Stallion
- Foaled: 8 February 2007
- Country: United Kingdom
- Colour: Brown
- Breeder: Shadwell Estate Co Ltd
- Owner: Hamdan Al Maktoum
- Trainer: Mark Johnston
- Record: 12: 4-0-3
- Earnings: £177,719

Major wins
- Mill Reef Stakes (2009); Middle Park Stakes (2009)

Awards
- Timeform rating 119

Awzaan (foaled 8 February 2007) is a British Thoroughbred racehorse and sire. He showed his best form as a two-year-old in 2009 when he was unbeaten in four races including the Mill Reef Stakes and the Middle Park Stakes. He raced for two more seasons but never won again. In 2012 he was retired from racing to become a breeding stallion in Uruguay.

== Background ==
Awzaan was a brown horse with no white markings bred in England by his owner Hamdan Al Maktoums Shadwell Estate. He was sent into training with Mark Johnston at his stable at Middleham in North Yorkshire.

He was from the ninth crop of foals sired by the Cartier Champion Two-year-old Colt Alhaarth, whose other progeny have included Mourayan (Sydney Cup), Phoenix Reach and Haafhd. Awzaan's dam Nufoos was a successful racemare in the Shadwell colours, winning three races including the 2005 edition of the Listed Eternal Stakes at Warwick Racecourse. Apart from Awzaan she also produced the Sandringham Handicap winner Muteela. She was descended from the British broodmare Pelting (foaled 1958) who was the female-line ancestor of several other major winners including Moon Ballad, Bassenthwaite, Telescope, Braashee (Prix Royal-Oak) and Central Park (Derby Italiano, runner-up in the Melbourne Cup).

== Racing career ==
=== 2009: two-year-old season ===
Awzaan made his racecourse debut in a six furlong maiden race at Hamilton Racecourse on 17 June and started at odds of 11/4 in a six -runner field. Ridden by Greg Fairley he took the lead soon after the start and kept on well to win by a length from the favourite Paradise Spectre. Richard Hills then took over the ride and partnered Awzaan in all but two of his subsequent races. At Newmarket Racecourse on 9 July the colt started at odds of 9/1 in a field of ten runners for a minor race over six furlongs. After being restrained by Hills in the early stages he took the lead a furlong out and drew away in the closing stages to win by five lengths from the Clive Brittain-trained Amary.

After a break of over two months Awzaan was stepped up in class to contest the Group Two Mill Reef Stakes over six furlongs at Newbury Racecourse on 19 September. He was made the 11/4 second favourite behind Radiohead, a colt who had won the Norfolk Stakes at Royal Ascot before finishing third against older sprinters in the Nunthorpe Stakes. The best of the other five runners appeared to be Stargaze (third in the Richmond Stakes) and the undefeated Quarrel. Awzaan raced at the rear of the field as Quarrel set the pace, before making progress approaching the last quarter mile. He went to the front a furlong out and won by one and a quarter lengths from the Richard Hannon, Sr-trained Angel's Pursuit despite hanging to the left in the closing stages. After the race Richard Hills said "He really is a lovely horse to ride and has a lovely turn of foot... He's quite a mature horse". Hamdan Al Maktoum's racing manages Angus Gold said "Sheikh Hamdan wanted him to have a break after Newmarket and the only worry was how much weight he had put on. But we're thrilled with that and I should think he'll go for the Middle Park now."

On 2 October Awzaan, as Gold had predicted, was moved up to Group One level for the Middle Park Stakes over six furlongs on good to firm ground. The Godolphin colt Poet's Voice (winner of the Champagne Stakes) started favourite ahead of the John Gosden-trained Showcasing (Gimcrack Stakes) with Awzaan third in the betting on 4/1. The only other runners were Radiohead and the unbeaten Irish challenger Arctic (Round Tower Stakes). Hills settled the colt in a close fourth place as Poet's Voice set the pace from Showcasing and Arctic. Awzaan took the lead approaching the final furlong despite again hanging left and held off the fast-finishing Radiohead by three-quarters of a length with Showcasing a neck away in third. Hills, who received a one-day ban for "careless riding" from the racecourse stewards commented "He tended to go slightly left at the end, but it didn't really matter. His ears were pricked and he was enjoying himself". Bookmakers responded to the race by cutting Awzaan's odds for the following year's 2000 Guineas to as low as 8/1.

=== 2010: three-year-old season ===
Awzaan made his first appearance of 2010 in the classic 2000 Guineas over the Rowley Mile at Newmarket on 1 May and started 8/1 third favourite in a nineteen-runner field. After racing in mid-division he began to struggle three furlongs out and faded to finish in fifteenth place behind Makfi. Mark Johnston was at a loss to explain the colt's performance, saying "I haven't got a clue why he ran so poorly. It is too bad to be true."

After a five-month break, Awzaan returned in the Listed Superior Mile at Haydock Park on 4 September and finished third of the eight runners behind the four-year-old Cityscape. Two weeks later he was again matched against older opposition in the Dubai Duty Free Cup over seven furlongs at Newbury and produced his best effort of the season. After racing towards the rear of the fourteen-runner field in the early running he stayed on well in second half of the race and finished third, beaten a neck and a short head by Delegator and Sir Gerry. On his final appearance of the year in the Joel Stakes in October he appeared to be travelling well until the final quarter mile but then dropped away abruptly and finished tailed off last of the nine runners behind Cityscape.

=== 2011: four-year-old season ===
Awzaan remained in training as a four-year-old but failed to recover his best form. He finished third in a minor weight-for-age race over seven furlongs at York Racecourse on 21 May and then ran sixth in the Diomed Stakes at Epsom two weeks later. Later in June he finished fifth to Libranno in Criterion Stakes at Newmarket. On his final appearance he was dropped back in class for the Listed City Plate at Chester on 9 July and finished ninth of the eleven runners behind Majestic Myles.

== Assessment ==
In the 2009 European Thoroughbred Rankings, Awzaan was given a rating of 117, making him the eighth-best juvenile of the year, seven pounds behind the top-rated St Nicholas Abbey.

== Stud record ==
In January 2012 it was announced that Awzaan had been retired from racing and would begin his career as a breeding stallion at the Haras Cuatro Piedras in Progreso, Uruguay where he was later joined by Invasor.

== Pedigree ==
Pedigree of Awzaan (GB), brown stallion, 2007
Sire Alhaarth (IRE) 1993	Unfuwain (USA); 1985	Northern Dancer	Nearctic
Sire Alhaarth (IRE) 1993	Unfuwain (USA); 1985	Northern Dancer	Natalma
Sire Alhaarth (IRE) 1993	Unfuwain (USA); 1985	Height of Fashion	Bustino
Sire Alhaarth (IRE) 1993	Unfuwain (USA); 1985	Height of Fashion	Highclere
Sire Alhaarth (IRE) 1993	Irish Valley (USA); 1982	Irish River	Riverman
Sire Alhaarth (IRE) 1993	Irish Valley (USA); 1982	Irish River	Irish Star
Sire Alhaarth (IRE) 1993	Irish Valley (USA); 1982	Green Valley	Val de Loir
Sire Alhaarth (IRE) 1993	Irish Valley (USA); 1982	Green Valley	Sly Pola
Dam Nufoos (GB) 2002	Zafonic (USA); 1990	Gone West	Mr Prospector
Dam Nufoos (GB) 2002	Zafonic (USA); 1990	Gone West	Secrettame
Dam Nufoos (GB) 2002	Zafonic (USA); 1990	Zaizafon	The Minstrel
Dam Nufoos (GB) 2002	Zafonic (USA); 1990	Zaizafon	Mofida
Dam Nufoos (GB) 2002	Desert Lynx (IRE); 1993	Green Desert	Danzig
Dam Nufoos (GB) 2002	Desert Lynx (IRE); 1993	Green Desert	Foreign Courier
Dam Nufoos (GB) 2002	Desert Lynx (IRE); 1993	Sweeping	Indian King
Dam Nufoos (GB) 2002	Desert Lynx (IRE); 1993	Sweeping	Glancing (Family: 4-k)
