= Solonaway Stakes =

Flat horse race in Ireland

- Class: Group 2
- Location: Leopardstown Racecourse; County Dublin, Ireland
- Race type: Flat / Thoroughbred
- Website: Leopardstown

Race information
- Distance: 1 mile (1,609 metres)
- Surface: Turf
- Track: Left-handed
- Qualification: Three-years-old and up
- Weight: 9 st 3 lb (3yo); 9 st 8 lb (4yo+); Allowances; 3 lb for fillies and mares Penalties; 3 lb for Group 1 winners* * since 1 January
- Purse: €188,000 (2022); 1st: €118,000

Solonaway Stakes
2026
Quddwah	Audience	Charles Fort

Previous years
2025
Alakazi	Mutasarref	Comanche Brave
2024
Diego Velazquez	Mutasarref	Mountain Bear
2023
Flight Plan	Buckaroo	Victoria Road
2022
Jadoomi	Glounthaune	Boundless Ocean
2021
Real Appeal	Fev Rover	Horoscope

2020-2011
2020
Safe Voyage	Sinawann	Vatican City
2019
Space Traveller	Matterhorn	Pincheck
2018
I Can Fly	Kenya	Pincheck
2017
Suedois	True Valour	Psychedelic Funk
2016
Awtaad	Custom Cut	Hit It A Bomb
2015
Custom Cut	Top Notch Tonto	Lightning Spear
2014
Bow Creek	Mustajeeb	Gordon Lord Byron
2013
Brendan Brackan	Ansgar	Darwin
2012
Famous Name	One Spirit	Aloof
2011
Cityscape	Wild Wind	Across The Rhine

2010-2001
2010
Steinbeck	Wade Giles	Across The Rhine
2009
Border Patrol	Poet	Zafisio
2008
Jumbajukiba	Prima Luce	Mystical Lady
2007
Jumbajukiba	Cougar Bay	Lord Admiral
2006
Ivan Denisovich	Latino Magic	Dunelight
2005
Kings Point	Solskjaer	Sugarhoneybaby
2004
Troubadour	Miss Mambo	Caradak
2003
Hymn Of Love	Livadiya	Definite Best
2002
Umistim	Blatant	Castle Gandolfo
2001
Magic Cove	Beckett	Maumee

2000-1991
2000
Shoal Creek	Mudaa-Eb	Scottish Memories
1999
Scottish Memories	Wray	Quws
1998
Risk Material	Lil's Boy	Free To Speak
1997
Quws	Mr Lightfoot	Via Verbano
1995
Royal Ballerina	Idris	Double On
1994
Memories	Wandering Thoughts	Karikata
1993
Idris	Approach The Bench	Never Back Down
1992
Equal Eloquence	Tijara	Thyer
1991
Julie La Rousse	Misty Valley	Approach The Bench

1990-1988
1990
Lepoushka	Lotus Pool	Ghaadah
1989
Milieu	Top-Boot	Society Bay
1988
Lady Eileen	Milieu	Break Fast

The Solonaway Stakes is a Group 2 flat horse race in Ireland open to thoroughbreds aged three years or older. It is run at Leopardstown over a distance of 1 mile (1,609 metres), and it is scheduled to take place each year in September.

The event is named after Solonaway, the winner of the Irish 2,000 Guineas in 1949, and was previously run at The Curragh. It was contested over a mile during the late 1980s and early 1990s, and for a period it was classed at Listed level. It was extended by a furlong in 1993.

The Solonaway Stakes reverted to a mile in 2001, and was given Group 3 status in 2007. It was upgraded to Group 2 status from 2014, and in the same year it was transferred to Leopardstown and became part of the Irish Champions Weekend fixture.

== Records ==
Most successful horse since 1987 (2 wins):

- Jumbajukiba – 2007, 2008

Leading jockey since 1987 (4 wins):

- Johnny Murtagh – Julie la Rousse (1991), Ger's Royal (1996), Scottish Memories (1999), Steinbeck (2010)

Leading trainer since 1987 (7 wins):

- Aidan O'Brien – Risk Material (1998), Shoal Creek (2000), Troubadour (2004), Ivan Denisovich (2006), Steinbeck (2010), I Can Fly (2018), Diego Velazquez (2024)

== Winners since 1987 ==
Year	Winner	Age	Jockey	Trainer	Time
1987	Patriach	5	Declan Gillespie	John Dunlop
1988	Lady Eileen	3	David Parnell	Kevin Prendergast	1:54.30
1989	Milieu	4	Michael Kinane	Dermot Weld	1:40.80
1990	Lepoushka	4	John Reid	Peter Hill	1:39.90
1991	Julie la Rousse	3	Johnny Murtagh	John Oxx	1:46.90
1992	Equal Eloquence	3	Richard Hughes	John Oxx	1:44.10
1993	Idris	3	Michael Kinane	John Oxx	2:02.60
1994	Memories	3	Willie Carson	James Burns	2:04.90
1995	Royal Ballerina	5	Warren O'Connor	Michael Kauntze	1:55.70
1996	Ger's Royal	5	Johnny Murtagh	Pat Flynn	1:56.80
1997	Quws	3	Stephen Craine	Kevin Prendergast	1:55.00
1998	Risk Material	3	Seamie Heffernan	Aidan O'Brien	1:57.20
1999	Scottish Memories	3	Johnny Murtagh	John Mulhern	1:58.40
2000	Shoal Creek	3	Michael Kinane	Aidan O'Brien	1:54.90
2001	Magic Cove	3	Pat Shanahan	Con Collins	1:49.20
2002	Umistim	5	Dane O'Neill	Richard Hannon Sr.	1:37.90
2003	Hymn of Love	3	Pat Smullen	Dermot Weld	1:38.40
2004	Troubadour	3	Jamie Spencer	Aidan O'Brien	1:40.20
2005	Kings Point	4	Paul Hanagan	Richard Fahey	1:38.20
2006	Ivan Denisovich	3	Kieren Fallon	Aidan O'Brien	1:36.20
2007	Jumbajukiba	4	Fran Berry	Jessica Harrington	1:36.26
2008	Jumbajukiba	5	Fran Berry	Jessica Harrington	1:49.61
2009	Border Patrol	3	Kevin Manning	Roger Charlton	1:48.08
2010	Steinbeck (Note: The 2010 winner Steinbeck was later exported to Hong Kong and renamed Pure Champion)	3	Johnny Murtagh	Aidan O'Brien	1:40.83
2011	Cityscape	5	Steve Drowne	Roger Charlton	1:43.70
2012	Famous Name	7	Pat Smullen	Dermot Weld	1:38.09
2013	Brendan Brackan	4	Colin Keane	Ger Lyons	1:37.77
2014	Bow Creek	3	Joe Fanning	Mark Johnston	1:37.63
2015	Custom Cut	6	Danny Tudhope	David O'Meara	1:40.90
2016	Awtaad	3	Chris Hayes	Kevin Prendergast	1:43.86
2017	Suedois	6	Danny Tudhope	David O'Meara	1:42.39
2018	I Can Fly	3	Ryan Moore	Aidan O'Brien	1:38.70
2019	Space Traveller	3	Billy Lee	Richard Fahey	1:39.31
2020	Safe Voyage	7	Colin Keane	John Quinn	1:39.44
2021	Real Appeal	4	Shane Foley	Jessica Harrington	1:41.23
2022	Jadoomi	4	Christophe Soumillon	Simon & Ed Crisford	1:45.38
2023	Flight Plan	3	Daniel Tudhope	Karl Burke	1:38.89
2024	Diego Velazquez	3	Ryan Moore	Aidan O'Brien	1:38.94
2025	Alakazi	3	Ben Coen	Johnny Murtagh	1:39.76
2026	Quddwah	6	James Doyle	Simon & Ed Crisford	1:39.64

== See also ==
- Horse racing in Ireland
- List of Irish flat horse races
