= Winter Hill Stakes =

Flat horse race in Britain

- Class: Group 3
- Location: Windsor Racecourse; Windsor, England
- Race type: Flat
- Sponsor: Weatherbys
- Website: Windsor

Race information
- Distance: 1m 2f (2,012 m)
- Surface: Turf
- Track: Left and right-handed
- Qualification: Three-years-old
- Weight: 9 st 0 lb (3yo); 9 st 7 lb (4yo+); Allowances; 3 lb for fillies and mares Penalties; 7 lb for Group 1 winners* 5 lb for Group 2 winners * 3 lb for Group 3 winners * * after 2024
- Purse: £70,000 (2025); 1st: £34,026

Winter Hill Stakes
2025
Silawi	Military Order	Royal Playwright

Previous years
2024
My Prospero	Certain Lad	Persica
2023
Passenger	West Wind Blows	Burdett Road
2022
Regal Reality	Grocer Jack	Royal Champion
2021
Solid Stone	Fancy Man	Harrovian

2020-2011
2020
Extra Elusive	Fox Chairman	Sky Defender
2019
Desert Encounter	Matterhorn	Accidental Agent
2018
Fabricate	Global Giant	Euro Nightmare
2017
Fabricate	Spark Plug	Chain Of Daisies
2016
Chain Of Daisies	Ulysses	Foundation
2015
Racing History	Cannock Chase	Battalion
2014
Al Kazeem	True Story	Complicit
2013
Planteur	Al Waab	Chil The Kite
2012
Lay Time	Primevere	Grandeur
2011
Prince Siegfried	Dux Scholar	Simon De Montfort

2010-2001
2010
Distant Memories	Hot Prospect	Flying Cloud
2009
Campanologist	Bankable	Kingdom Of Fife
2008
Stotsfold	Traffic Guard	Unnefer
2007
Queen's Best	Winged Cupid	Cougar Bay
2006
Tam Lin	Reunite	Kandidate
2005
Eccentric	Hattan	Fruhlingssturm
2004
Ancient World	Gateman	Fruhlingssturm
2003
Leporello	Bourgainville	Island House
2002
Naheef	Chianti	Nadour Al Bahr
2001
Adilabad	Askham	Premier Prize

2000-1991
2000
Adilabad	Albarahin	Forbearing
1999
Zindabad	Alabaq	Prolix
1998
Annus Mirabilis	Mountain Song	Crimson Tide
1997
Annus Mirabilis	Even Top	Fahris
1996
Annus Mirabilis	Salmon Ladder	Storm Trooper
1995
Desert Shot	Captain Horatius	Alriffa
1994
Young Buster	Mack The Knife	Baron Ferdinand
1993
Usaidit	Source Of Light	Muhayaa
1992
Shuailaan	Adam Smith	Knifebox
1991
Filia Ardross	Lord Charmer	Fire Top

1990-1988
1990
Song Of Sixpence	Landyap	Akamantis
1989
Dolpour	Legal Case	Per Quod
1988
Hibernian Gold	Love The Groom	Nayrizi

The Winter Hill Stakes is a Group 3 flat horse race in Great Britain open to horses aged three years. It is run at Windsor over a distance of 1 mile and 2 furlongs (2,012 metres), and it is scheduled to take place each year in September.

For a period the event was classed at Listed level. It was promoted to Group 3 status in 1995, and is currently the only Group race usually held at Windsor.

The venue stages regular evening meetings throughout the summer, and the Winter Hill Stakes was usually the feature race on the final day. Prior to 2026 it was open to horses aged three years and older. In 2026 the race was moved back a week into September and restricted to three-year-old horses only.

== Records ==
Most successful horse (3 wins):

- Annus Mirabilis – 1996, 1997, 1998

Leading jockey (5 wins):

- Frankie Dettori – Annus Mirabilis (1996, 1997), Naheef (2002), Campanologist (2009), Planteur (2013)

Leading trainer (10 wins):

- Sir Michael Stoute – Samarid (1986), Dolpour (1989), Desert Shot (1995), Adilabad (2000, 2001), Tam Lin (2006), Queen's Best (2007), Solid Stone (2021), Regal Reality (2022), Passenger (2023)

== Winners ==
Year	Winner	Age	Jockey	Trainer	Time
1976	Amboise	3	Alan Bond	Henry Cecil	2:31.90
1977	Fool's Mate	6	Joe Mercer	Henry Cecil	2:34.80
1978	Malecite	5	Joe Mercer	Henry Cecil	2:25.40
1979	Crested Grebe	4	Eddie Hide	Bruce Hobbs	2:28.50
1980	Masked Marvel	4	Joe Mercer	Henry Cecil	Not taken
1981	Royal Fountain	4	Joe Mercer	Peter Walwyn	2:29.10
1982	Brady	3	Philip Robinson	Mick Ryan	2:36.00
1983	Millfontaine	3	Greville Starkey	Guy Harwood	2:27.40
1984	Alleging	3	Lester Piggott	Henry Cecil	2:07.80
1985	Regal Diplomat	3	Pat Eddery	Alec Stewart	2:08.20
1986	Samarid	3	Walter Swinburn	Michael Stoute	2:05.80
1987	Media Starguest	3	Ray Cochrane	Luca Cumani	2:05.00
1988	Hibernian Gold	3	Greville Starkey	Guy Harwood	2:07.20
1989	Dolpour	3	Walter Swinburn	Michael Stoute	2:08.40
1990	Song of Sixpence	6	Steve Cauthen	Ian Balding	2:07.40
1991	Filia Ardross	5	Richard Hills	Alec Stewart	2:05.40
1992	Shuailaan	3	Michael Roberts	Alec Stewart	2:06.50
1993	Usaidit	4	John Reid	Terry Mills	2:03.90
1994	Young Buster	6	Paul Eddery	Geoff Wragg	2:04.40
1995	Desert Shot	5	Walter Swinburn	Michael Stoute	2:06.30
1996	Annus Mirabilis	4	Frankie Dettori	Saeed bin Suroor	2:09.10
1997	Annus Mirabilis	5	Frankie Dettori	Saeed bin Suroor	2:03.80
1998	Annus Mirabilis	6	Daragh O'Donohoe	Saeed bin Suroor	2:03.90
1999	Zindabad	3	Kieren Fallon	Ben Hanbury	2:03.80
2000	Adilabad	3	Pat Eddery	Sir Michael Stoute	2:07.40
2001	Adilabad	4	Kieren Fallon	Sir Michael Stoute	2:08.00
2002	Naheef	3	Frankie Dettori	Saeed bin Suroor	2:04.60
2003	Leporello	3	Richard Quinn	Peter Harris	2:06.56
2004	Ancient World	4	Kerrin McEvoy	Saeed bin Suroor	2:08.97
2005	Eccentric	4	Darryll Holland	Andrew Reid	2:05.02
2006	Tam Lin	3	Ryan Moore	Sir Michael Stoute	2:06.91
2007	Queen's Best	4	Ryan Moore	Sir Michael Stoute	2:07.98
2008	Stotsfold	5	Adam Kirby	Walter Swinburn	2:05.06
2009	Campanologist	4	Frankie Dettori	Saeed bin Suroor	2:02.44
2010	Distant Memories	4	Jamie Spencer	Tom Tate	2:08.75
2011	Prince Siegfried	5	Ted Durcan	Saeed bin Suroor	2:07.44
2012	Lay Time	4	Jimmy Fortune	Andrew Balding	2:07.83
2013	Planteur	6	Frankie Dettori	Marco Botti	2:08.00
2014	Al Kazeem	6	George Baker	Roger Charlton	2:01.62
2015	Racing History	3	William Buick	Saeed bin Suroor	2:07.75
2016	Chain Of Daisies	4	Fergus Sweeney	Henry Candy	2:02.58
2017	Fabricate	5	Gerald Mosse	Michael Bell	2:04.25
2018	Fabricate	6	James Doyle	Michael Bell	2:08.03
2019	Desert Encounter	7	Jamie Spencer	David Simcock	2:04:24
2020	Extra Elusive	5	Hollie Doyle	Roger Charlton	2:11.38
2021	Solid Stone	5	Richard Kingscote	Sir Michael Stoute	2:07.46
2022	Regal Reality	7	Richard Kingscote	Sir Michael Stoute	2:03.01
2023	Passenger	3	Richard Kingscote	Sir Michael Stoute	2:03.94
2024	My Prospero	5	Cieren Fallon	William Haggas	2:07.71
2025	Silawi	5	Cieren Fallon	Hamad Al Jehani	2:03.41
2026	Maho Bay	3	William Buick	Charlie Appleby	2:06.31

== See also ==
- Horse racing in Great Britain
- List of British flat horse races
