= Poet's Voice =

British-bred Thoroughbred racehorse

- Sire: Dubawi
- Grandsire: Dubai Millennium
- Dam: Bright Tiara
- Damsire: Chief's Crown
- Sex: Stallion
- Foaled: 7 March 2007
- Died: 17 March 2018
- Country: United Kingdom
- Colour: Bay
- Breeder: Dalham Hall Stud
- Owner: Godolphin
- Trainer: Saeed bin Suroor
- Record: 16: 4-2-3
- Earnings: £357,992

Major wins
- Champagne Stakes (2009); Celebration Mile (2010); Queen Elizabeth II Stakes (2010)

Poet's Voice (7 March 2007 – 17 March 2018) was a British Thoroughbred racehorse and sire. He showed very good form as a two-year-old in 2009 when he won two races including the Champagne Stakes. He failed to live up to his promise in the first half of the following year but then returned to form to win the Celebration Mile and then defeated a very strong field to take the Queen Elizabeth II Stakes. He never won again and was retired at the end of 2011. He was a headstrong and unpredictable racehorse, breaking out of the starting stalls on one occasion and biting one of his rivals on another. He made a very promising start to his stallion career, siring the King George VI and Queen Elizabeth Stakes winner Poet's Word in his first season at stud.

== Background ==
Poet's Voice was a bay horse with no white markings who was bred by Sheikh Mohammed's Dalham Hall Stud and raced in the colours of the Sheikh's Godolphin organisation. He was trained by Saeed bin Suroor, whose stable is based at Newmarket, Suffolk, but typically relocates to Dubai in winter. He was ridden in all but one of his races by Frankie Dettori.

He was sired by Dubawi, a top-class son of Dubai Millennium, whose wins included the Irish 2,000 Guineas and the Prix Jacques Le Marois. At stud, Dubawi has been a highly-successful breeding stallion, siring major winners such as Monterosso, Al Kazeem, Makfi, Lucky Nine and Night of Thunder. Poet's Voice's dam Bright Tiara won one minor race in the United States and was later bought for $3,000,000 by John Ferguson Bloodstock on behalf of Sheikh Mohammed. Her dam Expressive Dance was a half-sister to General Assembly.

== Racing career ==
=== 2009: two-year-old season ===
Poet's Voice made his debut in a seven furlong maiden race at Newmarket Racecourse on 8 July in which he started at odds of 6/1 and finished third behind Elusive Pimpernel and Timely Jazz. Just over three weeks later, over the same course and distance, he recorded his first success: starting the 4/9 favourite, he took the lead approaching the final furlong and quickly went clear of his rivals, winning by ten lengths despite being eased down before the finish. The colt was then moved up in class and started 7/4 favourite for the Group 3 Acomb Stakes at York Racecourse in August but compromised his chances by breaking out of the starting stalls and having to be reloaded. When the race began he fought Dettori's attempts to restrain him and pulled his way to the front. He hung to the left in the last quarter mile, was overtaken in the closing stages, and finished third behind Elusive Pimpernel and Emerald Commander.

Despite his defeat at York, Poet's Voice was stepped up again in class for Group 2 Champagne Stakes at Doncaster Racecourse on 12 September and was made the 11/8 favourite against six opponents. He led from the start, accelerated approaching the final furlong and won by three quarters of a length from the Aidan O'Brien-trained Viscount Nelson. In the Group 1 Middle Park Stakes at Newmarket in October, the colt was dropped back in distance to six furlongs and started the 15/8 favourite. After leading for most of the way he was outpaced in the closing stages and finished fourth of the five runners behind Awzaan.

=== 2010: three-year-old season ===
On his first two races as a three-year-old, Poet's Voice ran without success in France: he finished eighth behind Lope de Vega in the Poule d'Essai des Poulains on 16 May and ninth to Joanna in the Prix de la Porte Maillot on 3 July. At Salisbury Racecourse on 12 August he started a 16/1 outsider for the Sovereign Stakes but belied his odds as he finished strongly and failed by only a nose to overhaul the pace-setting Sea Lord. He was partnered by Ted Durcan at Salisbury, but Dettori resumed the ride when the colt contested the Celebration Mile at Goodwood Racecourse and started the 2/1 second choice in the betting behind the five-year-old Main Aim, a two-time winner of the John of Gaunt Stakes. After being restrained at the rear of the four-runner field he took the lead a furlong out and drew away to win "comfortably" by four lengths.

The Group 1 Queen Elizabeth II Stakes over one mile at Ascot Racecourse on 25 September attracted an international field, with Poet's Voice starting the 9/2 third choice in the betting behind Makfi and Rip Van Winkle. The other five runners were Beethoven, Hearts of Fire (Gran Criterium), Red Jazz (European Free Handicap), Bushman (Diomed Stakes) and Air Chief Marshal (Minstrel Stakes). Air Chief Marshal set the pace for his stablemate Rip Van Winkle with Poet's Voice retrained at the rear of the field before making a forward move on the outside two furlongs from the finish. The final furlong saw a three way struggle between Rip Van Winkle on the rail, Poet's Voice on the outside and the 40/1 outsider Red Jazz between horses, resulting in a photo finish. Poet's Voice was adjudged to have won by a nose from Rip Van Winkle, with Red Jazz half a length away in third. After the race Dettori said "The horse was in tremendous form coming into the race, and it means so much to win these big races for Godolphin at Ascot, which is a special course for me. Saeed was confident he would run great. I thought we had a few pounds to find on form, but Saeed was right".

On his final appearance of the year he was moved up in distance for the Champion Stakes over ten furlongs at Newmarket on 16 October but made little impression and came home ninth of the ten runners behind Twice Over.

In the 2010 World Thoroughbred Rankings Poet's Voice was given a rating of 122, making him the 23rd best racehorse in the world.

=== 2011: four-year-old season ===
In the winter of 2010/11 Poet's Voice was sent to Godolphin's training base in Dubai. On his first run of the year he was narrowly beaten by Wigmore Hall in the Jebel Hatta on turf at Meydan Racecourse on 3 March, with Presvis in third. Later that month he was switched to the synthetic Tapeta surface at the same venue for the Dubai World Cup but came home last of the fourteen runners, more than 20 lengths behind the winner Victoire Pisa. After a lengthy break, Poet's Voice returned to the track in August when he attempted to repeat his 2010 success in the Celebration Mile. He started favourite but after biting one of his opponents during the race he finished last of seven in a race won by Dubawi Gold. In his two other starts that year he finished third to Ransom Note in the Joel Stakes at Newmarket in September and sixth to Frankel in the Queen Elizabeth II Stakes on the 15th of October.

== Stud record ==
Poet's Voice was retired from racing to become a breeding stallion at Dalham Hall, Newmarket.

He produced two individual Group 1 winners namely Poet's Word and Trap For Fools (LKS Mackinnon Stakes).

Poet's Voice died on 17 March 2018, aged 11 after suffering a heart attack at Dalham Hall Stud.

Saeed bin Suroor, who trained Poet's Voice throughout his racing career, said, "I am very sad to hear of the death of Poet's Voice and my condolences go to His Highness Sheikh Mohammed and everyone connected to him at Darley. He was a pleasure to train, always relaxed in his work and gave his best throughout his career. His victory in the QEII S. was very special indeed."

== Pedigree ==
Pedigree of Poet's Voice (GB), bay horse, 2007
Sire Dubawi (IRE) 2002	Dubai Millennium (GB); 1996	Seeking the Gold	Mr. Prospector
Sire Dubawi (IRE) 2002	Dubai Millennium (GB); 1996	Seeking the Gold	Con Game
Sire Dubawi (IRE) 2002	Dubai Millennium (GB); 1996	Colorado Dancer	Shareef Dancer
Sire Dubawi (IRE) 2002	Dubai Millennium (GB); 1996	Colorado Dancer	Fall Aspen
Sire Dubawi (IRE) 2002	Zomaradah (GB); 1995	Deploy	Shirley Heights
Sire Dubawi (IRE) 2002	Zomaradah (GB); 1995	Deploy	Slightly Dangerous
Sire Dubawi (IRE) 2002	Zomaradah (GB); 1995	Jawaher	Dancing Brave
Sire Dubawi (IRE) 2002	Zomaradah (GB); 1995	Jawaher	High Tern
Dam Bright Tiara (USA) 1989	Chief's Crown (USA); 1982	Danzig	Northern Dancer
Dam Bright Tiara (USA) 1989	Chief's Crown (USA); 1982	Danzig	Pas de Nom
Dam Bright Tiara (USA) 1989	Chief's Crown (USA); 1982	Six Crowns	Secretariat
Dam Bright Tiara (USA) 1989	Chief's Crown (USA); 1982	Six Crowns	Chris Evert
Dam Bright Tiara (USA) 1989	Expressive Dance (USA); 1978	Riva Ridge	First Landing
Dam Bright Tiara (USA) 1989	Expressive Dance (USA); 1978	Riva Ridge	Iberia
Dam Bright Tiara (USA) 1989	Expressive Dance (USA); 1978	Exclusive Dancer	Native Dancer
Dam Bright Tiara (USA) 1989	Expressive Dance (USA); 1978	Exclusive Dancer	Exclusive (Family 10-a)
