= Superior Mile =

Flat horse race in Britain

- Class: Group 3
- Location: Haydock Park; Haydock, England
- Inaugurated: 2003
- Race type: Flat / Thoroughbred
- Sponsor: Betfair
- Website: Haydock Park

Race information
- Distance: 1m 37y (1,643 metres)
- Surface: Turf
- Track: Left-handed
- Qualification: Three-years-old and up
- Weight: 8 st 12 lb (3yo); 9 st 3 lb (4yo+); Allowances; 5 lb for fillies and mares Penalties; 7 lb for Group 1 winners * 5 lb for Group 2 winners * 3 lb for Group 3 winners * * after 31 March
- Purse: £77,700 (2021); 1st: £45,368

Superior Mile
2026
Persica	The Lost King	Fondo Blanco

Previous years
2025
Zeus Olympios	Excellent Believe	Checkandchallenge
2024
Holloway Boy	Prague	Witch Hunter
2023
Chindit	Light Infantry	Regal Reality
2022
Triple Time	Tacarib Bay	Marie's Diamond
2021
Artistic Rifles	Bell Rock	My Oberon

2020-2011
2020
Top Rank	My Oberon	Khaloosy
2019
Great Scot	Matterhorn	Raising Sand
2018
Here Comes When	Circus Couture	Regal Reality
2017
Ballet Concerto	Kaspersky	Morando
2016
Hathal	Mitchum Swagger	Convey
2015
Balty Boys	Sovereign Debt	Hors De Combat
2014
Captain Cat	Balty Boys	Ocean Tempest
2013
Top Notch Tonto	Hay Dude	Gabrial
2012
Thistle Bird	Fulbright	Boom And Bust
2011
King Torus	Questioning	Dark Promise

2010-2003
2010
Cityscape	Secrecy	Awzaan
2009
Confront	Bushman	Derbaas
2007
Harvest Queen	Smart Enough	Caldra
2006
Zero Tolerance	Indian Steppes	St Petersburg
2005
Linngari	With Reason	Quito
2004
With Reason	Troubadour	Audience
2003
Gateman	Pentecost	Attache

The Superior Mile is a Group 3 flat horse race in Great Britain open to horses aged three years or older. It is run over a distance of 1 mile and 37 yards (1,643 metres) at Haydock Park in early September.

== History ==
The event was established in 2003, and it originally held Listed status. The first running was won by Gateman. It was promoted to Group 3 level in 2013.

The Superior Mile is currently staged on the final day of Haydock Park's three-day Sprint Cup Festival. It is run on the same day as the Sprint Cup and is sponsored by the online gaming company Unibet. From 2016 to 2018 the race was run under sponsored titles.

== Records ==
Most successful horse:

- no horse has won this race more than once

Leading jockey (3 wins):

- James Doyle - Thistle Bird (2012), Chindit (2023), Persica (2026)

Leading trainer (3 wins):

- Roger Charlton – Cityscape (2010), Thistle Bird (2012), Captain Cat (2014)
- Sir Michael Stoute – Linngari (2005), Confront (2009), Ballet Concerto (2017)

== Winners ==
Year	Winner	Age	Jockey	Trainer	Time
2003	Gateman	6	Keith Dalgleish	Mark Johnston	1:44.11
2004	With Reason	6	Kerrin McEvoy	Saeed bin Suroor	1:41.80
2005	Linngari	3	Ryan Moore	Sir Michael Stoute	1:41.76
2006	Zero Tolerance	6	Jamie Spencer	David Barron	1:48.47
2007	Harvest Queen	4	Seb Sanders	Peter Makin	1:43.58
2008	Abandoned due to waterlogging
2009	Confront	4	Stéphane Pasquier	Sir Michael Stoute	1:47.43
2010	Cityscape	4	Steve Drowne	Roger Charlton	1:39.44
2011	King Torus	3	Richard Hughes	Richard Hannon Sr.	1:43.11
2012	Thistle Bird	4	James Doyle	Roger Charlton	1:40.77
2013	Top Notch Tonto	3	Dale Swift	Brian Ellison	1:43.35
2014	Captain Cat	5	George Baker	Roger Charlton	1:44.10
2015	Balty Boys	6	Silvestre de Sousa	Brian Ellison	1:43.91
2016	Hathal	4	Frankie Dettori	William Haggas	1:47.15
2017	Ballet Concerto	4	Richard Kingscote	Sir Michael Stoute	1:45.93
2018	Here Comes When	8	Oisin Murphy	Andrew Balding	1:49.60
2019	Great Scot	3	Richard Kingscote	Tom Dascombe	1:44.09
2020	Top Rank	4	P. J. McDonald	James Tate	1:46.60
2021	Artistic Rifles	5	Andrea Atzeni	Edward Bethell	1:39.85
2022	Triple Time	3	Andrea Atzeni	Kevin Ryan	1:40.78
2023	Chindit	5	James Doyle	Richard Hannon Jr.	1:41.04
2024	Holloway Boy	4	William Buick	Karl Burke	1:40.21
2025	Zeus Olympios	3	William Buick	Karl Burke	1:37.90
2026	Persica	5	James Doyle	Richard Hannon Jr.	1:45.25

== See also ==
- Horse racing in Great Britain
- List of British flat horse races
