= Noble Mission =

British Thoroughbred racehorse

- Racing colours of Khalid Abdulla
- Sire: Galileo
- Grandsire: Sadler's Wells
- Dam: Kind
- Damsire: Danehill
- Sex: Stallion
- Foaled: 25 February 2009
- Country: Great Britain
- Colour: Bay
- Breeder: Juddmonte Farms
- Owner: Khalid Abdullah
- Trainer: Henry Cecil; Lady Cecil
- Jockey: Tom Queally; Eddie Ahern; Ian Mongan; James Doyle
- Record: 21: 9–6–2
- Earnings: £1,364,058

Major wins
- Newmarket Stakes (2012); Gordon Stakes (2012); Tapster Stakes (2013); Gordon Richards Stakes (2014); Huxley Stakes (2014); Tattersalls Gold Cup (2014); Grand Prix de Saint-Cloud (2014); Champion Stakes (2014)

Awards
- Cartier Champion Older Horse (2014)

Noble Mission (foaled 25 February 2009) is a British Thoroughbred racehorse. Best known as the younger brother of the unbeaten Frankel in his early career, he later became a very successful racehorse in his own right. He won the Gordon Stakes as a three-year-old in 2012, but did not reach his peak until 2014. In 2014, Noble Mission then won the Group 3 Gordon Richards Stakes and Huxley Stakes, before winning his first Group 1 race when beating Magician in the Tattersalls Gold Cup. He went on to win the Grand Prix de Saint-Cloud in June and the Champion Stakes in October. He is owned by Khalid Abdullah and was trained by Sir Henry Cecil until Cecil's death in 2013, when Lady Cecil, Sir Henry's widow, became his trainer.

== Background ==
Noble Mission is a bay horse with a white blaze and white socks on his front legs bred by Juddmonte Farms. He was sired by Galileo, who won the Derby, Irish Derby and King George VI and Queen Elizabeth Stakes in 2001. Since retiring to stud, Galileo has become one of the world's leading stallions and has been champion sire of Great Britain and Ireland multiple times. His other progeny include Cape Blanco, Frankel, Golden Lilac, Nathaniel, New Approach, Rip Van Winkle and Ruler of the World.

Noble Mission's dam is Kind, a daughter of Danehill, who was trained by Roger Charlton and won two Listed races. Kind became a broodmare for Juddmonte Farms and her most famous foal was Frankel, Noble Mission's full-brother, who won ten Group 1 races and retired unbeaten. She has also foaled Lingfield Derby Trial winner Bullet Train and Joyeuse, who has won two listed races.

== Racing career ==
=== 2011: Two-year-old season ===
Noble Mission made his racecourse debut on 25 October 2011, in a one-mile maiden race at Great Yarmouth. In what was his only race as a two-year-old, he was ridden by Tom Queally and finished in second place, five lengths behind winner Swedish Sailor.

=== 2012: Three-year-old season ===
In April 2012, he contested a one-mile maiden at Newbury, where he started favourite and won easily. On 5 May he stepped up in class and distance for the Listed Newmarket Stakes, where he again started favourite. After the start, Tom Queally positioned him in fourth place of the five runners, and then closed up with two furlongs left to run, before taking the lead inside the final furlong and winning by a neck from Mariner's Cross. After the Newmarket Stakes he Noble Mission was quoted as a 20/1 shot for the 2012 Derby. He returned to Newmarket two weeks later for the Fairway Stakes, when he was ridden for the first time by Eddie Ahern. In a tight finish, he finished second, a neck behind Thought Worthy and three quarters of a length ahead of third-placed Rugged Cross.

Noble Mission never ran in the Derby, but instead went to Royal Ascot for the King Edward VII Stakes, where he faced Thought Worthy again, along with Derby-third Astrology, Thomas Chippendale and Initiator. Noble Mission, who was once again ridden by regular jockey Tom Queally, was involved in another close finish. After being impeded earlier in the finishing straight, he took the lead with one furlong still to run, but could not hold off stablemate Thomas Chippendale, who won the race by half a length, with Noble Mission coming second. At Glorious Goodwood, Noble Mission ran in the Gordon Stakes and started as the 11/4 second-favourite. In the early stages he was held up near the rear of the field by Tom Queally, before starting to close on the leaders with two furlongs remaining. He took the lead one furlong out and raced level with Encke (who won the St. Leger later in the year) right to the finishing line, with Noble Mission winning by a nose. The pre-race favourite, Michelangelo, finished in third place 2 1/2 lengths behind Noble Mission and Encke.

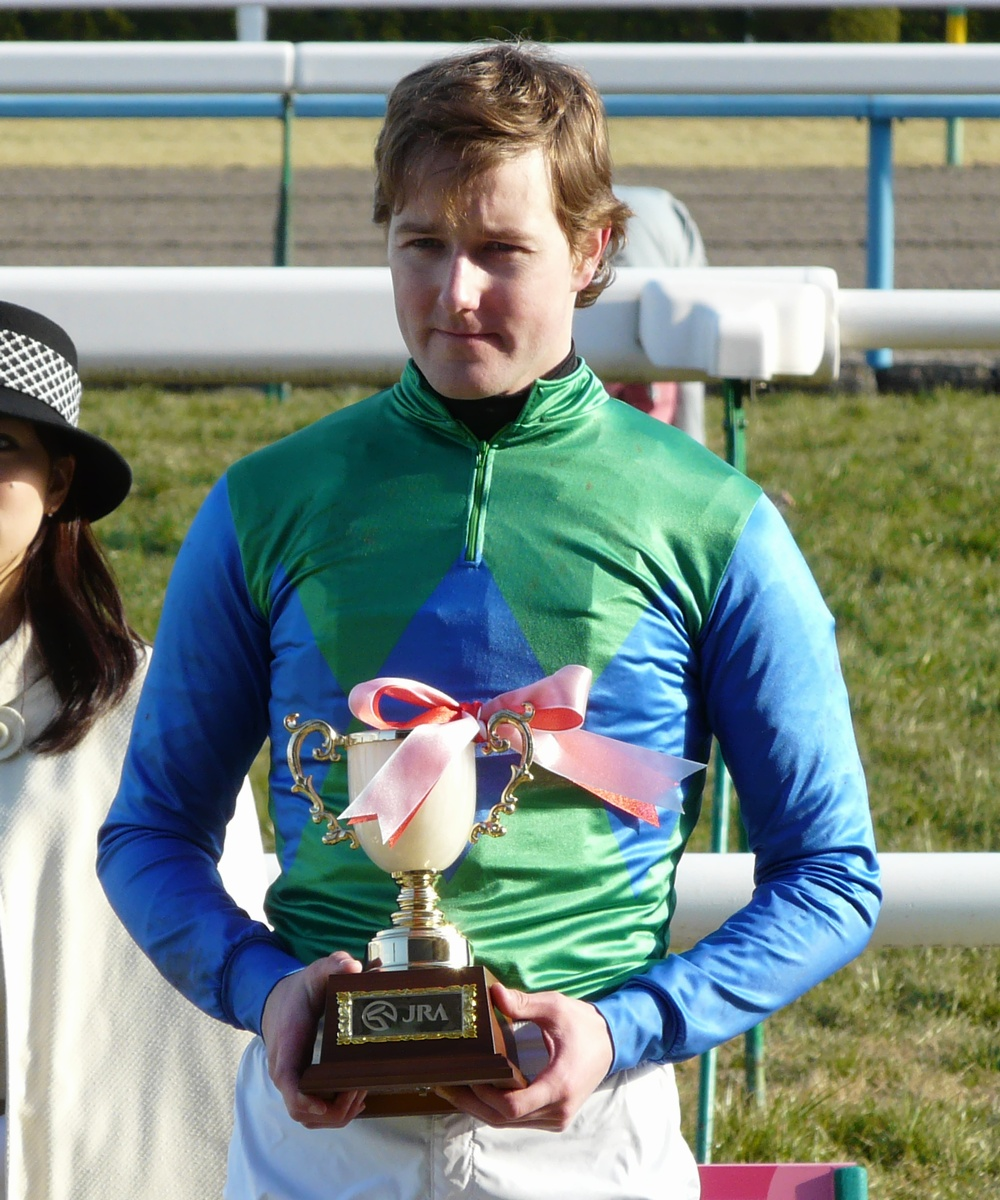
Tom Queally, who was Noble Mission's regular jockey until the end of 2013

On 22 August, Noble Mission finished fourth behind winner Thought Worthy in the Great Voltigeur Stakes at York. Noble Mission's final race of the season came at Newbury on 27 October in the St. Simon Stakes. He was settled in the middle of the pack by Queally before challenging leader Hazel Lavery in the final furlong, but he could not get to the front and Hazel Lavery won by half a length, with Noble Mission finishing in second.

=== 2013: Four-year-old season ===
In his first race as a four-year-old, Noble Mission faced eight rivals in the John Porter Stakes, on 20 April 2013. The race was won by the four-year-old colt Universal, who beat Quiz Mistress by a head, with Noble Mission a head behind the runner-up in third place. On 4 May he finished last of four runners behind winner Universal in the Jockey Club Stakes. On his following start, Noble Mission dropped in class for the Listed Tapster Stakes, which is run over one-and-a-half miles at Goodwood. Ridden for the first time by Ian Mongan, he took the lead with over one furlong still to run and pulled clear to win by four lengths from Genzy. At Royal Ascot, Noble Mission contested the Hardwicke Stakes, where at the price of 12/1, he was one of the outsiders. He finished the race in fourth place, about 3 1/2 lengths behind winner Thomas Chippendale.

On his next start, Noble Mission stepped down in distance for the 10-furlong Rose of Lancaster Stakes at Haydock Park, where the odds-on favourite was the three-year-old Telescope. After being slowly away, he was held up at the rear of the field by jockey Tom Queally. He closed in on the leaders two furlongs out, but could not quite catch them, finishing in third place, just over a length behind winner David Livingston. Noble Mission then raced outside the United Kingdom for the first time, when he took part in the Prix Dollar at Longchamp. Amongst the favourites in the betting were Cirrus des Aigles, Planteur and Maputo. Noble Mission was ridden for the first time by James Doyle, who had become the retained rider for Khalid Abdullah since the horses previous run in the Rose of Lancaster. He was slowly away at the start again, and although he reduced the gap to the leaders in the finishing straight, he never contested the lead. The race was won by Cirrus des Aigles, who beat Mandour by one-and-three-quarter lengths, with Petit Chevalier third and Noble Mission fourth.

=== 2014: Five-year-old season ===
As in 2013, Noble Mission's 2014 seasonal debut came in the John Porter Stakes on 12 April, where he finished in second place, a neck behind winner Cubanita. Thirteen days later he ran in the Gordon Richards Stakes. In this race, instead of being held up, he was sent into the lead in the early stages by James Doyle. He was never caught and in the final furlong he pulled clear to win by nine lengths from Telescope, with Contributor a further nine lengths back in third place. Telescope re-opposed Noble Mission in his next race, the Huxley Stakes, with Ektihaam also amongst the opposition. Noble Mission and Ektihaam contested the lead, before the latter took the lead outright, and then faded. This left Noble Mission in front, and he pulled out a few lengths lead two furlongs out. Telescope stayed on and finished second, but could not catch Noble Mission who won the race by 2 1/4 lengths.

Noble Mission was then supplemented for the Group 1 Tattersalls Gold Cup, which is run at The Curragh, at the cost of €21,000. The ground conditions were described as soft and three horses were pulled out of the race before the start, including Dewhurst winner Parish Hall. The betting was dominated by Noble Mission and two-time Group 1 winner Magician, who started as the even-money joint-favourites. The three other runners were Hall Of Mirrors, Einsteins Folly and Euphrasia. Noble Mission led the field from the start and pulled clear with two furlongs left to run, Magician and Euphrasia (who finished second and third respectively) reduced his lead in the final furlong but could not get on terms with him and Noble Mission won by 1 1/4 lengths. This was both Noble Mission's and trainer Lady Cecil's first Group 1 win.

Noble Mission traveled to France for Grand Prix de Saint-Cloud on 29 June. Flintshire was the favourite, with Noble Mission next in the betting. Doyle sent Noble Mission out into the lead from the start, and had pulled out a three-length lead as the field entered the finishing straight. He was still in the lead by three lengths with about 100 metres left to run, but then tired and faded quickly. Spiritjim just overtook Noble Mission at the finishing line, winning by a head. Siljan's Saga finished in third place, about a neck behind the winner. Noble Mission was later awarded the victory after Spritjim tested positive for the banned substance clenbuterol. About one month later, Noble Mission contested the Bayerisches Zuchtrennen. After being drawn wide he started well, but had to race wide around the first bend. In the back straight he moved up to be just behind leader Nausica Time, until taking the lead about 500 metres from the finish. He ran on well, but was overtaken by Lucky Lion 70 metres out. Lucky Lion won the race, beating Noble Mission by half a length, with third-placed Calyxa three lengths behind Noble Mission.

On 18 October, Noble Mission started the 7/1 fourth choice in the betting for the Champion Stakes, the race in which Frankel had concluded his unbeaten career in 2012. His eight rivals included Cirrus des Aigles (the 7/4 favourite), Ruler of the World, the six-year-old Al Kazeem, and the lightly raced but highly regarded Irish colt Free Eagle. Racing on heavy ground, Noble Mission was sent into the lead by Doyle from the start and set the pace from Al Kazeem, with Ruler of the World and Cirrus des Aigles close behind. As the field entered the straight many of the fancied runners were struggling and the race evolved into a protracted struggle between Noble Mission and Al Kazeem. The older horse gained a slight advantage inside the final furlong, but Noble Mission rallied in the final strides to win by a neck after a "thrilling duel", with Free Eagle finishing one and a quarter lengths back in third. An emotional Lady Cecil said "It's just a fairytale. It means so much to us. When he died I kept the licence to feel closer to him". Doyle commented "I knew it was Al Kazeem as soon as I saw his head alongside and I know what a good horse he is, but this fella is unbelievable. He just relaxes in front now, and I was able to save a bit for the finish".

On 2 November it was announced that Noble Mission would retire from racing and begin his career as a breeding stallion at Lane's End Farm in Versailles, Kentucky.

== Assessment ==
During his three-year-old season he achieved a rating of 115 in the Gordon Stakes, officially ranking him as the joint-236th best horse in the world.

In November Noble Mission was named Champion Older Horse at the Cartier Racing Awards.

== Stud record ==
In his first season at stud, Noble Mission sired the Grade I Travers Stakes winner Code of Honor.

=== Notable progeny ===
c = colt, f = filly, g = gelding

Foaled	Name	Sex	Major Wins
2016	Code of Honor	c	Travers Stakes, Jockey Club Gold Cup
2019	Nobals	g	Breeders' Cup Turf Sprint

== Pedigree ==
Pedigree of Noble Mission, bay stallion, 2009
Sire Galileo (IRE) b. 1998	Sadler's Wells (USA) b. 1981	Northern Dancer* b. 1961	Nearctic
Sire Galileo (IRE) b. 1998	Sadler's Wells (USA) b. 1981	Northern Dancer* b. 1961	Natalma
Sire Galileo (IRE) b. 1998	Sadler's Wells (USA) b. 1981	Fairy Bridge b. 1975	Bold Reason
Sire Galileo (IRE) b. 1998	Sadler's Wells (USA) b. 1981	Fairy Bridge b. 1975	Special
Sire Galileo (IRE) b. 1998	Urban Sea (USA) ch. 1989	Miswaki ch. 1978	Mr. Prospector
Sire Galileo (IRE) b. 1998	Urban Sea (USA) ch. 1989	Miswaki ch. 1978	Hopespringseternal
Sire Galileo (IRE) b. 1998	Urban Sea (USA) ch. 1989	Allegretta ch. 1978	Lombard
Sire Galileo (IRE) b. 1998	Urban Sea (USA) ch. 1989	Allegretta ch. 1978	Anatevka
Dam Kind (IRE) b. 2001	Danehill (USA) b. 1986	Danzig b./br. 1977	Northern Dancer*
Dam Kind (IRE) b. 2001	Danehill (USA) b. 1986	Danzig b./br. 1977	Pas De Nom
Dam Kind (IRE) b. 2001	Danehill (USA) b. 1986	Razyana b. 1981	His Majesty
Dam Kind (IRE) b. 2001	Danehill (USA) b. 1986	Razyana b. 1981	Spring Adieu
Dam Kind (IRE) b. 2001	Rainbow Lake (GB) b. 1990	Rainbow Quest b. 1981	Blushing Groom
Dam Kind (IRE) b. 2001	Rainbow Lake (GB) b. 1990	Rainbow Quest b. 1981	I Will Follow
Dam Kind (IRE) b. 2001	Rainbow Lake (GB) b. 1990	Rockfest ch. 1979	Stage Door Johnny
Dam Kind (IRE) b. 2001	Rainbow Lake (GB) b. 1990	Rockfest ch. 1979	Rock Garden

Note: b. = Bay, br. = Brown, ch. = Chestnut

* Noble Mission is inbred 3 × 4 to the stallion Northern Dancer, meaning that Northern Dancer appears once in the third generation and once in the fourth generation of his pedigree.
