= Cityscape (horse) =

British-bred Thoroughbred racehorse

- Racing silks of Khalid Abdullah
- Sire: Selkirk
- Grandsire: Sharpen Up
- Dam: Tantina
- Damsire: Distant View
- Sex: Stallion
- Foaled: 2 February 2006
- Country: United Kingdom
- Colour: Chestnut
- Breeder: Juddmonte Farm
- Owner: Khalid Abdullah
- Trainer: Roger Charlton
- Record: 23: 6-9-2
- Earnings: £2,992,356

Major wins
- Superior Mile (2010); Joel Stakes (2010); Solonaway Stakes (2011); Prix Perth (2011); Dubai Duty Free Stakes (2012)

Cityscape (foaled 2 February 2006) is a British-bred Thoroughbred racehorse and sire, who raced in England, Ireland, Hong Kong, France, Dubai, Canada and Italy and was twice rated among the top 40 racehorses in the world.

As a juvenile in 2018 he showed promising form, winning one minor race and finishing second in the Royal Lodge Stakes but in the following spring after finishing second in the Greenham Stakes he ran unplaced in the 2000 Guineas and missed the rest of the year through injury. In 2010 he returned the track and won the Superior Mile and the Joel Stakes. As a five-year-old he emerged as a top-class performer, winning the Solonaway Stakes and the Prix Perth as well as being placed in the Queen Anne Stakes and the Hong Kong Mile. On his first appearance of 2012 he recorded his biggest success when he was an emphatic winner of the Dubai Duty Free Stakes and went on to be placed in the Prix Jacques Le Marois, Woodbine Mile and Queen Elizabeth II Stakes.

At the end of his racing career he was retired to become a breeding stallion in England.

== Background ==
Cityscape is a chestnut horse with a broad white blaze and white socks on his hind legs bred in England by his owner Khalid Abdullah's Juddmonte Farm. He was sent into training with Roger Charlton at Beckhampton in Wiltshire and, until the end of 2011 he was ridden in most of his races by Steve Drowne.

He was sired by Selkirk an American-bred miler who won the Queen Elizabeth II Stakes in 1991. As a breeding stallion, his other successful offspring included Wince, Sublimity, Kastoria and Thistle Bird (Pretty Polly Stakes). Cityscape's dam Tantina won four of her five races including the Oak Tree Stakes and the Sceptre Stakes before becoming of other foals have included the Temple Stakes winner Bated Breath. She was descendant of the influential American broodmare Best In Show, the ancestor of numerous major winners including El Gran Senor, Try My Best, Xaar, Jazil, Rags to Riches and Redoute's Choice.

== Racing career ==
=== 2008: two-year-old season ===
On his racecourse debut Cityscape started a 16/1 outsider for a maiden race over one mile at Newmarket Racecourse on 15 August and exceeded expectations as he finished second of the eleven runners. On 4 September over the same distance at Salisbury Racecourse he started 11/10 favourite for a minor event and recorded his first victory as he drew right away from his opponents to win "readily" by nine lengths. The colt was then stepped up sharply in class to contest the Group 2 Royal Lodge Stakes at Ascot Racecourse and was made the 15/8 favourite. He took the lead approaching the final furlong but was overtaken in the final strides and beaten three quarters of a length by Jukebox Jury.

=== 2009: three-year-old season ===
On his first appearance as a three-year-old Cityscape ran in the Greenham Stakes (a major trial race for the 2000 Guineas) at Newbury Racecourse on 18 April and finished second to the Irish-trained favourite Vocalised. In the 2000 Guineas two weeks later he made little impact and came home fourteenth of the fifteen runners behind Sea the Stars.

=== 2010: four-year-old season ===
After an absence of almost a year, Cityscape returned in a handicap race at Newbury on 17 April 2010 in which he was ridden by Jimmy Fortune and finished well to take fourth place. Eleven days later he was partnered by Ryan Moore in the Listed Paradise Stakes at Ascot when he started the 4/9 favourite but was beaten into second place by the six-year-old gelding King of Dixie. Drowne resumed the ride when Cityscape returned from another lengthy hiatus for the Superior Mile at Haydock Park on 4 September and started at 9/2 in an eight-runner field which included Awzaan Ordnance Row (Sovereign Stakes), Fanunalter (Doncaster Mile) and the favourite Secrecy. Two years to the day since his last success Cityscape took the lead a furlong out and won by one and quarter lengths from Secrecy. On 1 October Cityscape started 4/1 second choice in the betting behind Penitent (Lincoln Handicap, Fortune Stakes) in the Group 3 Joel Stakes at Newmarket. He went to the front in the last quarter mile and steadily increased his advantage to come home seven lengths clear of Penitent in second.

=== 2011: five-year-old season ===
Cityscape began his fourth campaign in the Sandown Mile on 23 April and finished second of the five runners behind Dick Turpin. In the Queen Anne Stakes at Royal Ascot on 14 June he ran third behind Canford Cliffs and Goldikova. He was then sent to France for a very strong renewal of the Prix Jacques Le Marois at Deauville Racecourse on 15 August and came home eighth of the twelve runners in a race won by Immortal Verse. On 11 September Cityscape was sent to Ireland for the Group 3 Solonaway Stakes at the Curragh and started the 2/5 favourite against five opponents headed by the Ruby Stakes winner Wild Wind. After racing in second place he went to the front approaching the final furlong, and won by two and a half lengths despite being eased by Drowne in the closing stages.

Less than two weeks after his win in Ireland Cityscape was shipped to Italy for the Group 1 Premio Vittorio di Capua at San Siro Racecourse in Milan. He took the lead in the straight and opened up a clear advantage but was caught on the line and beaten a short head by Dick Turpin. On 30 October the horse was back in France for the Group 3 Prix Perth on very soft ground over 1600 metres at Longchamp Racecourse and started favourite against eleven opponents including Nova Hawk (runner-up in the Coronation Stakes), Polytechnicien (Prix Exbury) and Sommerabend (Grosse Europa-Meile). Cityscape took the lead soon after the start and was never seriously challenged, accelerating away from his rivals in the last 300 metres to win "easily" by two lengths from Sommerabend. For his final appearance of the season Cityscape was sent to Sha Tin Racecourse to contest the Hong Kong Mile on 11 December and started a 32/1 outsider in a fourteen-runner field. He produced a sustained run on the outside in the straight and finished a neck second behind Able One with the favoured Xtension in third and Sahpresa, Apapane and Jimmy Choux unplaced.

In the 2011 World Thoroughbred Rankings Cityscape was given a rating of 121, making him the 38th best racehorse in the world.

=== 2012: six-year-old season ===
For his first run as a six-year-old, Cityscape was sent to Dubai to contest the Group 1 Dubai Duty Free Stakes over 1800 metres at Meydan Racecourse in which he was ridden for the first time by James Doyle who became his regular jockey that year. He was made the 8/1 third choice in the betting behind Ambitious Dragon and Mutahadee (third in the Jebel Hatta) in a fifteen-runner field which also included Await the Dawn (Hardwicke Stakes), Dark Shadow (Mainichi Okan), Xtension, California Memory, Presvis, Delegator (Duke of York Stakes) and Musir (UAE Derby). After tracking the leaders Cityscape went to the front 500 metres from the finish and went clear of the field in the closing stages to win "comfortably" by four and a quarter lengths from Mutahadee in a course-record time of 1:48.65. Roger Charlton commented "The horse has been really consistent and has been training really well. He had a good preparation at home and he's come out here and not lost any weight. I thought it was the most competitive race on the card and I didn't think he'd break the track record and win by four and a quarter lengths". In the Champions Mile in Hong Kong on 1 May Cityscape started the 6/5 favourite but after struggling to obtain a clear run in the straight he came home tenth of the sixteen runners behind Xtension.

On his return to Europe ran consistently well against top-class opposition but failed to win in four races. After finishing fourth behind Nathaniel, Farhh and Twice Over in the Eclipse Stakes at Sandown on 7 July he ran for the second time in the Prix Jacques Le Marois at Deauville and was beaten into second place by Excelebration with Elusive Kate, Moonlight Cloud, Immortal Verse, Golden Lilac, Fallen For You and Most Improved finishing behind. On 16 September he was sent to Woodbine Racetrack in Canada for the Woodbine Mile in which he finished third behind Wise Dan. On his final run of the year in the Queen Elizabeth II Stakes at Ascot on 20 October he took the lead approaching the final furlong but was overtaken and beaten three lengths into second place by Excelebration.

In the 2012 World Thoroughbred Rankings Cityscape was given a rating of 124, making him the 13th best racehorse in the world.

=== 2013: seven-year-old season ===
Cityscape remained in training as a seven-year-old in 2013 but made only appearance. On 18 May, in the Lockinge Stakes at Newbury he started the 6/1 third choice in the betting but finished tailed-off last of the twelve runners behind Farhh. His retirement was announced in October 2013.

== Stud career ==
After his retirement from racing Cityscape was retired to become a breeding stallion at the Overbury Stud in Gloucestershire. His first two crops of foals included Give And Take (Musidora Stakes), Dan's Dream (Fred Darling Stakes), and The Broghie Man (Committed Stakes).

=== Notable progeny ===
c = colt, f = filly, g = gelding

| Foaled | Name | Sex | Major Wins |
| 2015 | Top One Scape | c | Gran Premio Internacional Joaquín S. de Anchorena (ARG) (2019) |
| 2017 | Top One City | c | Gran Premio Polla de Potrillos (ARG) |
| 2017 | Zillion Stars | c | Gran Premio Internacional Joaquín S. de Anchorena (ARG) (2021) |
| 2018 | Zodiacal | c | Gran Premio Jockey Club (ARG) |
| 2019 | Chili Flag (FR) | f | Just a Game Stakes |
| 2019 | The Punisher | c | Gran Premio Carlos Pellegrini (ARG) |

== Pedigree ==
Pedigree of Cityscape (GB), chestnut stallion, 2006
| Sire Selkirk (USA) 1988 | Sharpen Up (GB); 1969 | Atan (USA) | Native Dancer |
| Sire Selkirk (USA) 1988 | Sharpen Up (GB); 1969 | Atan (USA) | Mixed Marriage (GB) |
| Sire Selkirk (USA) 1988 | Sharpen Up (GB); 1969 | Rocchetta | Rockefella |
| Sire Selkirk (USA) 1988 | Sharpen Up (GB); 1969 | Rocchetta | Chambiges (FR) |
| Sire Selkirk (USA) 1988 | Annie Edge (IRE); 1980 | Nebbiolo (GB) | Yellow God |
| Sire Selkirk (USA) 1988 | Annie Edge (IRE); 1980 | Nebbiolo (GB) | Novara (GER) |
| Sire Selkirk (USA) 1988 | Annie Edge (IRE); 1980 | Friendly Court | Be Friendly (GB) |
| Sire Selkirk (USA) 1988 | Annie Edge (IRE); 1980 | Friendly Court | No Court (GB) |
| Dam Tantina (USA) 2000 | Distant View; 1991 | Mr. Prospector | Raise a Native |
| Dam Tantina (USA) 2000 | Distant View; 1991 | Mr. Prospector | Gold Digger |
| Dam Tantina (USA) 2000 | Distant View; 1991 | Seven Springs | Irish River (FR) |
| Dam Tantina (USA) 2000 | Distant View; 1991 | Seven Springs | La Trinite (FR) |
| Dam Tantina (USA) 2000 | Didina (GB); 1992 | Nashwan (USA) | Blushing Groom (FR) |
| Dam Tantina (USA) 2000 | Didina (GB); 1992 | Nashwan (USA) | Height of Fashion (FR) |
| Dam Tantina (USA) 2000 | Didina (GB); 1992 | Didicoy (USA) | Danzig |
| Dam Tantina (USA) 2000 | Didina (GB); 1992 | Didicoy (USA) | Monroe (Family: 8-f) |
