= Coroebus (horse) =

Irish-bred, British-trained Thoroughbred racehorse (2019–2022)

- Sire: Dubawi
- Grandsire: Dubai Millennium
- Dam: First Victory
- Damsire: Teofilo
- Sex: Colt
- Foaled: 19 March 2019
- Died: 4 September 2022 (aged 3)
- Country: Ireland
- Colour: Bay
- Breeder: Godolphin
- Owner: Godolphin
- Trainer: Charlie Appleby
- Record: 7: 4–1–0
- Earnings: £652,114

Major wins
- 2000 Guineas (2022); St James's Palace Stakes (2022); Timeform rating: 128
- Last updated on 12 September 2022

Coroebus (19 March 2019 – 4 September 2022) was an Irish-bred, British-trained Thoroughbred racehorse. He showed promise as a juvenile in 2021 when he won two of his three races, including the Autumn Stakes. He won the 2000 Guineas on his first run as a three-year-old and went on to win the St James's Palace Stakes. He was fatally injured when falling in the Prix du Moulin de Longchamp in September 2022.

== Background ==
Coroebus was a bay colt with no white markings bred and owned by Sheikh Mohammed's Godolphin organisation. He was trained by Charlie Appleby.

He was from the twelfth crop of foals sired by Dubawi, whose wins included the Irish 2,000 Guineas and the Prix Jacques Le Marois. At stud, Dubawi has been a highly successful breeding stallion, siring major winners such as Ghaiyyath, Too Darn Hot, Al Kazeem, Makfi, Old Persian, Lucky Nine and Night of Thunder. Coroebus' dam First Victory showed high-class form in a brief racing career, winning the Group 3 Oh So Sharp Stakes on the second of her four starts. She was a half-sister to Thunder Snow, Ihtimal (Sweet Solera Stakes, UAE 1000 Guineas, UAE Oaks) and Always Smile (Hambleton Stakes), as well as being closely related to Balanchine and West Wind (Prix de Diane).

== Racing career ==
=== 2021: two-year-old season ===
Coroebus began his racing career in a novice race (for horses with no more than two previous wins) over seven furlongs on good to firm ground at Newmarket Racecourse on 13 August. Ridden by William Buick he started favourite and won by one and a quarter lengths from Saga after taking the lead approaching the final furlong. In the following month at the same track the colt was stepped up in class and distance for the Group 2 Royal Lodge Stakes over one mile and started the 85/40 favourite against six opponents. After taking the lead three furlongs out he opened up a clear advantage but began to struggle in the closing stages and was caught in the final strides by Royal Patronage who won by a neck. Charlie Appleby commented "He'll have learned plenty today. We've been pleased with him at home and he's a beautiful-looking horse. I think he's just got a bit lonely out in front there in the end. He only had one run under his belt and got picked up by a horse who has had plenty of racing now".

On his final appearance of the year, Coroebus started 4/5 favourite for the Group 3 Autumn Stakes over one mile at Newmarket on 9 October when the best fancied of his nine opponents were Dubai Poet and Imperial Fighter. After being restrained by Buick towards the rear of the field Coroebus moved up to take the lead approaching the last quarter mile and won "comfortably" by two lengths. After the race, Appleby said "He's a horse who has always been exciting – even in the spring he was doing stuff he shouldn't have been doing for the size of him. He's always impressed us at home – I could have run him in May if I'd wanted to ... He wouldn't want much further than a mile. If anything, when he strengthens up he'll get quicker."

=== 2022: three-year-old season ===
For his first run as a three-year-old Coroebus contested the Group 1 2000 Guineas over the Rowley Mile at Newmarket on 30 April and went off the 5/1 third choice in the betting behind his stablemate Native Trail and the Irish-trained Luxembourg. The other twelve contenders included Royal Patronage, Perfect Power, Point Lonsdale (Futurity Stakes), Light Infantry (Horris Hill Stakes), Lusail (Gimcrack Stakes) and Berkshire Shadow (Coventry Stakes). With Buick riding Native Trail, Coroebus was partnered by James Doyle. Royal Patronage set the pace, with Coroebus being restrained towards the rear of the field before making rapid progress approaching the last quarter mile. He gained the advantage a furlong from the finish and stayed on well to win by three quarters of a length from Native Trail with Luxembourg a further length and a half away in third place. After the race Doyle commented

He travelled incredibly strong throughout. Around the two something joined me quite quick and I just asked him a couple of questions going into the Dip and he responded incredibly. He hit the line great and showed a potent turn of foot. It forced my hand early. If that didn't happen I could have afforded to be even cheekier and he would have won even more impressively.

On 14 June at Royal Ascot Coroebus started the 10/11 favourite for the St James's Palace Stakes over one mile on good-to-firm ground, with his ten rivals including Angel Bleu, My Prospero (Heron Stakes), Lusail, Berkshire Shadow and Maljoom (Mehl-Mülhens-Rennen). After racing just behind the leaders as Lusail set the pace, Coroebus looked unlikely to obtain a clear run in the straight before breaking through on the inside rail. In a closely contested finish he gained the lead inside the final furlong and kept on well to win by a head from with My Prospero, Majloom and Mighty Ulysses a short head, a neck and a head away in third, fourth and fifth. William Buick commented

it was one of those races where it was tricky ... He travels extremely strongly and you just want him to drop his head. In the straight I had no option to go until there was enough room, and then he picked it up and went through. He's got everything you could ask for in a racehorse.

Coroebus died on 4 September 2022 during the Prix du Moulin de Longchamp race at Longchamp Racecourse in Paris, France. The horse stumbled and fell 1 1/2 furlongs from the finish as jockey William Buick moved him out from a pack of horses to challenge for position entering the home straight. Coroebus, who was favourite to win the race, suffered a fatal injury. Buick was unharmed. Charlie Appleby paid tribute to the horse the following day, saying "It is very sad to see a great horse, who gave so much to racing, lose his life in this way. Everyone took a lot of joy from his victories in the 2,000 Guineas and at Royal Ascot.".

== Pedigree ==
Pedigree of Coroebus (IRE), bay colt, 2019
Sire Dubawi (IRE) 2002	Dubai Millennium (GB); 1996	Seeking The Gold (USA)	Mr. Prospector
Sire Dubawi (IRE) 2002	Dubai Millennium (GB); 1996	Seeking The Gold (USA)	Con Game
Sire Dubawi (IRE) 2002	Dubai Millennium (GB); 1996	Colorado Dancer (IRE)	Shareef Dancer (USA)
Sire Dubawi (IRE) 2002	Dubai Millennium (GB); 1996	Colorado Dancer (IRE)	Fall Aspen (USA)
Sire Dubawi (IRE) 2002	Zomaradah (GB); 1995	Deploy	Shirley Heights
Sire Dubawi (IRE) 2002	Zomaradah (GB); 1995	Deploy	Slightly Dangerous (USA)
Sire Dubawi (IRE) 2002	Zomaradah (GB); 1995	Jawaher (IRE)	Dancing Brave (USA)
Sire Dubawi (IRE) 2002	Zomaradah (GB); 1995	Jawaher (IRE)	High Tern
Dam First Victory (IRE) 2013	Teofilo (IRE); 2004	Galileo	Sadler's Wells (USA)
Dam First Victory (IRE) 2013	Teofilo (IRE); 2004	Galileo	Urban Sea (USA)
Dam First Victory (IRE) 2013	Teofilo (IRE); 2004	Speirbhean	Danehill (USA)
Dam First Victory (IRE) 2013	Teofilo (IRE); 2004	Speirbhean	Saviour (USA)
Dam First Victory (IRE) 2013	Eastern Joy (GB); 2006	Dubai Destination (USA)	Kingmambo
Dam First Victory (IRE) 2013	Eastern Joy (GB); 2006	Dubai Destination (USA)	Mysterial
Dam First Victory (IRE) 2013	Eastern Joy (GB); 2006	Red Slippers (USA)	Nureyev
Dam First Victory (IRE) 2013	Eastern Joy (GB); 2006	Red Slippers (USA)	Morning Devotion (Family: 4-k)
