= Sovereign Stakes =

Discontinued flat horse race in Britain

- Class: Group 3
- Location: Salisbury Racecourse; Salisbury, England
- Inaugurated: 2000
- Final run: 2023
- Race type: Flat / Thoroughbred
- Sponsor: Tattersalls
- Website: Salisbury

Race information
- Distance: 1 mile (1,609 metres)
- Surface: Turf
- Track: Straight
- Qualification: Three-years-old and up colts and geldings
- Weight: 8 st 12 lb (3yo); 9 st 5 lb (4yo+); Penalties; 7 lb for Group 1 winners * 5 lb for Group 2 winners * 3 lb for Group 3 winners * * after 2021
- Purse: £70,000 (2022); 1st: £39,697

Sovereign Stakes
2023
Embesto	Mighty Ulysses	Regal Reality

Previous years
2022
Tempus	Modern News	Sinjaari
2021
Megallan	Sir Busker	Perotto

2020-2011
2020
Regal Reality	Beat Le Bon	Positive
2019
Kick On	Accidental Agent	Flashcard
2018
Plumatic	Oh This Is Us	Zonderland
2017
Ballet Concerto	Tabarrak	Carry On Deryck
2016
Zonderland	Master The World	Tupi
2015
Kodi Bear	Dark Emerald	Custom Cut
2014
Captain Cat	Producer	Rerouted
2013
Afsare	Boom And Bust	Professor
2012
Tullius	Sovereign Debt	Highland Knight
2011
Side Glance	Dance And Dance	The Rectifier

2010-2001
2010
Sea Lord	Poet's Voice	Secrecy
2009
Mac Love	Confront	Laa Rayb
2008
Ordnance Row	Laa Rayb	Redolent
2007
Pride of Nation	Ordnance Row	Olympian Odyssey
2006
Belenus	Notability	Kings Point
2005
Layman	Jack Sullivan	New Seeker
2004
Norse Dancer	Lucky Story	Hurricane Alan
2003
Passing Glance	Priors Lodge	Lundy's Lane
2002
Priors Lodge	Bourgainville	Vicious Knight
2001
Umistim	Momentum	Surprise Encounter

2000-1995
2000
Hopeful Light	Late Night Out	Crimson Tide
1999
Touch 'N' Fly	Al Waffi	Persiano
1998
Soviet Bureau	Zaya	Crimson Tide
1997
Showboat	Tarski	Mashhaer
1996
Wizard King	Russian Music	Loch Patrick
1995
Knight Commander	Muktabas	Hindaawee

The Sovereign Stakes was a Group 3 flat horse race in Great Britain open to colts and geldings aged three years or older. It was run at Salisbury over a distance of 1 mile (1,609 metres), and was scheduled to take place each year in August.

The event was established in 2000, replacing the Whitchurch Conditions Stakes, and it was initially classed at Listed level. It was promoted to Group 3 status in 2004. It was removed from the pattern race programme by the British Horseracing Authority in 2024.

The Sovereign Stakes was one of Salisbury's two highest class races of the season, along with the Dick Poole Fillies' Stakes.

== Records ==
Most successful horse:

- no horse won this race more than once

Leading jockey (2 wins):

- Dane O'Neill – Hopeful Light (2000), Umistim (2001)
- Jimmy Fortune – Side Glance (2011), Tullius (2012)
- Ryan Moore - Ordnance Row (2008), Ballet Concerto (2017)
- Oisin Murphy - Zonderland (2016), Kick On (2019)

Leading trainer (3 wins):

- Richard Hannon Sr. – Umistim (2001), Priors Lodge (2002), Ordnance Row (2008)
- Andrew Balding – Passing Glance (2003), Side Glance (2011), Tullius (2012)
- John Gosden - Hopeful Light (2000), Kick On (2019), Magellan (2021)

== Winners ==
Year	Winner	Age	Jockey	Trainer	Time
2000	Hopeful Light	3	Dane O'Neill	John Gosden	1:43.21
2001	Umistim	4	Dane O'Neill	Richard Hannon Sr.	1:40.97
2002	Priors Lodge	4	Pat Dobbs	Richard Hannon Sr.	1:41.02
2003	Passing Glance	4	Martin Dwyer	Andrew Balding	1:39.49
2004	Norse Dancer	4	John Egan	David Elsworth	1:41.63
2005	Layman	3	Kerrin McEvoy	Saeed bin Suroor	1:38.29
2006	Belenus	4	Frankie Dettori	Saeed bin Suroor	1:41.39
2007	Pride of Nation	5	Jamie Spencer	Luca Cumani	1:43.90
2008	Ordnance Row	5	Ryan Moore	Richard Hannon Sr.	1:44.24
2009	Mac Love	8	Micky Fenton	Stef Liddiard	1:40.29
2010	Sea Lord	3	Kieren Fallon	Mark Johnston	1:41.82
2011	Side Glance	4	Jimmy Fortune	Andrew Balding	1:41.01
2012	Tullius	4	Jimmy Fortune	Andrew Balding	1:41.84
2013	Afsare	6	Andrea Atzeni	Luca Cumani	1:39.28
2014	Captain Cat	5	James Doyle	Roger Charlton	1:41.45
2015	Kodi Bear	3	Gérald Mossé	Clive Cox	1:40.58
2016	Zonderland	3	Oisin Murphy	Clive Cox	1:40.35
2017	Ballet Concerto	4	Ryan Moore	Sir Michael Stoute	1:42.49
2018	Plumatic	4	Maxime Guyon	André Fabre	1:45.02
2019	Kick On	3	Oisin Murphy	John Gosden	1:45.81
2020	Regal Reality	5	Richard Kingscote	Sir Michael Stoute	1:38.32
2021	Magellan	3	Robert Havlin	John & Thady Gosden	1:43.09
2022	Tempus	6	Hollie Doyle	Archie Watson	1:41.32
2023 (dh)	Mighty Ulysses; Embesto	4; 3	Oisin Murphy; David Egan	John & Thady Gosden; Roger Varian	1:39.46

== See also ==
- Horse racing in Great Britain
- List of British flat horse races
