= Awtaad =

Irish-bred Thoroughbred racehorse

- Racing silks of Hamdan Al Maktoum
- Sire: Cape Cross
- Grandsire: Green Desert
- Dam: Asheerah
- Damsire: Shamardal
- Sex: Stallion
- Foaled: 1 February 2013
- Country: Ireland
- Colour: Brown
- Breeder: Shadwell Estate
- Owner: Hamdan Al Maktoum
- Trainer: Kevin Prendergast
- Record: 9: 5-0-2
- Earnings: £365,770

Major wins
- Madrid Handicap (2016); Tetrarch Stakes (2016); Irish 2000 Guineas (2016); Boomerang Stakes (2016)

Awtaad (foaled 1 February 2013) is an Irish Thoroughbred racehorse. He showed promise as a juvenile, winning a maiden race on his second racecourse appearance in October 2015. In the following spring he showed great improvement, winning the Madrid Handicap and the Tetrarch Stakes before recording a decisive victory over a strong field in the Irish 2000 Guineas. He was subsequently beaten in two Group 1 races before returning to winning form with a victory in the Boomerang Stakes.

== Background ==
Awtaad is a brown horse with no white markings bred in Ireland by Shadwell Estate, the breeding company of his owner Hamdan Al Maktoum. Awtaad was sired by Cape Cross a leading miler who won the Lockinge Stakes in 1998 and the Queen Anne Stakes in the following year. As a breeding stallion Cape Cross, who stands at the Kildangan Stud in County Kildare has had considerable success, being the sire of Ouija Board, Sea the Stars, Golden Horn and Able One. Awtaad was the first foal of his dam Asheerah who won one of her thirteen races and finished third in the Listed Salsabil Stakes in 2011. She was a female-line descendant of the outstanding American broodmare My Charmer.

Awtaad was sent into training with the veteran Irish trainer Kevin Prendergast at Friarstown, County Kildare. He was ridden in all of his races by the Irish jockey Chris Hayes.

== Racing career ==
=== 2015: two-year-old season ===
Awtaad began his racing career in a maiden race over seven furlongs at the Curragh on 11 October and started at odds of 9/1 in a sixteen-runner field. After being restrained by Hayes in the early stages he made steady progress in the last quarter mile to finish third, beaten two and a half lengths by the Aidan O'Brien-trained favourite Black Sea. Two weeks later the colt started 11/8 favourite against fourteen opponents in a maiden over the same distance at Leopardstown Racecourse. After tracking the leaders in the early stages he took the lead inside the last quarter mile and won by two lengths from Bravery.

=== 2016: three-year-old season ===
==== Spring ====
On his first appearance as a three-year-old, Awtaad carried top weight of 136 pounds in the Madrid Handicap over seven furlongs at the Curragh on 20 March. He was settled just behind the leaders before taking the lead in the last quarter mile and went clear of his rivals to win "easily" by five lengths from the Jim Bolger-trained Theodorico. On 2 May the colt was moved up in class for the Listed Tetrarch Stakes over the same course and distance and started second favourite behind the Killavullan Stakes winner Blue de Vega in a seven-runner field. He tracked the leaders before moving up to dispute the lead two furlongs out and drew away in the closing stages to win by two lengths from Blue de Vega.

Awtaad was stepped up in class again to contest the Group One Irish 2000 Guineas over one mile at the Curragh on 21 May. The 2000 Guineas winner Galileo Gold started favourite ahead of 2015 Champion two-year-old Air Force Blue with Awtaad third in the betting at odds of 9/2. The other five runners were Blue de Vega, Bravery, Air Vice Marshal (fourth in the 2000 Guineas), Sanus Per Aquam (Somerville Tattersall Stakes) and Shogun (runner-up in the Derrinstown Stud Derby Trial). Air Vice Marshal set the early pace ahead of Sanus Per Aquam, Shogun and Galileo Gold with Awtaad settling in fifth place. Awtaad moved up on the outside into third place three furlongs out before going to the front entering the final quarter mile. He quickly opened up a clear lead and won by two and a half lengths from Galileo Gold with a gap of four and a quarter lengths back to Blue de Vega in third place. Awtaad was the first winner of the race for his 83-year-old trainer since Northern Treasure in 1976. After the race Prendergast said "Awtaad’s always been a good horse from the time we got him... He’s as good a horse as I’ve had, anyway, and I’ve had Ardross".

==== Summer ====
At Royal Ascot on 14 June Awtaad faced Galileo Gold again in the St James's Palace Stakes, but the odds-on favourite for the race was The Gurkha, the winner of the Poule d'Essai des Poulains. After racing in fifth place behind Galileo Gold he moved up into second place in the straight but was unable to make any further progress and finished third behind Galileo Gold and The Gurkha. In July the colt was sent to England again for the Sussex Stakes in which he was matched against older horses for the first time. He raced in second place before fading badly in the closing stages and finished eighth of the ten runners behind The Gurkha.

==== Autumn ====
On 10 September Awtaad was dropped to Group Three class for the Boomerang Stakes over one mile at Leopardstown and started the 2/1 second favourite behind the Breeders' Cup Juvenile Turf winner Hit It A Bomb. After racing in third place he accelerated into the lead a furlong out and won by a length and a half from Custom Cut with Hit It A Bomb in third place. Following the race it was announced that Awtaad would be retired from racing at the end of the season and would begin his career as a breeding stallion at the Derrinstown Stud in 2017.

On his final racecourse appearance Awtaad was one of thirteen horses to contest the Queen Elizabeth II Stakes at Ascot on 15 October. He raced in mid-division before being bumped approaching the final furlong and finished fourth of the thirteen runners behind Minding, Ribchester and Lightning Spear.

== Stud career ==
In 2023 Awtadd stood at Derrinstown Stud for 5,000 Euros.

=== Notable progeny ===
c = colt, f = filly, g = gelding

Foaled	Name	Sex	Major wins
2018	Anmaat	g	Prix d'Ispahan, Champion Stakes
2020	Anisette	f	Del Mar Oaks, American Oaks, Gamely Stakes
2020	Ethical Diamond	g	Breeders' Cup Turf

== Pedigree ==
Pedigree of Awtaad (IRE), brown colt, 2013
Sire Cape Cross (IRE) 1994	Green Desert (USA); 1983	Danzig	Northern Dancer
Sire Cape Cross (IRE) 1994	Green Desert (USA); 1983	Danzig	Pas De Nom
Sire Cape Cross (IRE) 1994	Green Desert (USA); 1983	Foreign Courier	Sir Ivor
Sire Cape Cross (IRE) 1994	Green Desert (USA); 1983	Foreign Courier	Courtly Dee
Sire Cape Cross (IRE) 1994	Park Appeal (IRE); 1982	Ahonoora	Lorenzaccio
Sire Cape Cross (IRE) 1994	Park Appeal (IRE); 1982	Ahonoora	Helen Nichols
Sire Cape Cross (IRE) 1994	Park Appeal (IRE); 1982	Balidaress	Balidar
Sire Cape Cross (IRE) 1994	Park Appeal (IRE); 1982	Balidaress	Innocence
Dam Asheerah (GB) 2008	Shamardal (USA); 2002	Giant's Causeway	Storm Cat
Dam Asheerah (GB) 2008	Shamardal (USA); 2002	Giant's Causeway	Mariah's Storm
Dam Asheerah (GB) 2008	Shamardal (USA); 2002	Helsinki	Machiavellian
Dam Asheerah (GB) 2008	Shamardal (USA); 2002	Helsinki	Helen Street
Dam Asheerah (GB) 2008	Adaala (USA); 2002	Sahm	Mr Prospector
Dam Asheerah (GB) 2008	Adaala (USA); 2002	Sahm	Salsabil
Dam Asheerah (GB) 2008	Adaala (USA); 2002	Alshoowg	Riverman
Dam Asheerah (GB) 2008	Adaala (USA); 2002	Alshoowg	Ghashtah (Family: 13-c)
