= Poet's Word =

Irish-bred Thoroughbred racehorse

- Racing silks of Saeed Suhail
- Sire: Poet's Voice
- Grandsire: Dubawi
- Dam: Whirly Bird
- Damsire: Nashwan
- Sex: Stallion
- Foaled: 5 April 2013
- Country: Ireland
- Colour: Bay
- Breeder: Woodcote Stud Ltd
- Owner: Saeed Suhail
- Trainer: Michael Stoute
- Record: 17: 7-6-1
- Earnings: £2,951,329

Major wins
- Glorious Stakes (2017); Brigadier Gerard Stakes (2018); Prince of Wales's Stakes (2018); King George VI & Queen Elizabeth Stakes (2018)

Poet's Word (foaled 5 April 2013) is an Irish-bred, British-trained Thoroughbred racehorse and breeding stallion. He showed useful but unremarkable form in his first two seasons before developing into a high-class performer at the age of four when he won the Glorious Stakes as well as finishing second in both the Irish Champion Stakes and the Champion Stakes. He continued his progress as a five-year-old in 2018, winning the Brigadier Gerard Stakes, Prince of Wales's Stakes and King George VI & Queen Elizabeth Stakes.

== Background ==
Poet's Word is a bay horse standing 16.1 hands high (1.64 m) with no white markings bred in Ireland by the Woodcote Stud. As a yearling he was offered for sale at Tattersalls in October 2014 and bought for 300,000 guineas by the bloodstock agent Charles Gordon-Watson. He entered the ownership of Saeed Suhail and was sent into training with Michael Stoute in Newmarket, Suffolk.

He was from the first crop of foals sired by Poet's Voice, who won the Queen Elizabeth II Stakes in 2010. Poet's Word's dam Whirly Bird won five minor races and produced several other winners including the Prestige Stakes winner Malabar. She was a granddaughter of the Child Stakes winner Inchmurrin, making her a close relative of Balisada and Harbour Law.

== Racing career ==
=== 2015: two-year-old season ===
Poet's Word made his only appearance as a juvenile on 21 October when he started a 16/1 outsider for a maiden race over seven furlongs at Newmarket Racecourse. Ridden by Andrea Atzeni he recovered from a poor start to finish fourth, more than five lengths behind the winner Mootaharer.

=== 2016: three-year-old season ===
Poet's Word began his second campaign by finishing third to Taqdeer in a one-mile maiden on the Polytrack surface at Chelmsford City Racecourse on 16 April. On 6 May, ridden by Ryan Moore he contested a ten furlong maiden at Nottingham Racecourse and recorded his first success as he won "comfortably" by two and a quarter lengths. His three other appearances in 2016 were in handicap races. On 4 June at Epsom Racecourse he carried 124 pounds and finished fourth to Gawdawpalin (112), beaten five lengths. At Goodwood on 29 July he was ridden by Moore and started 7/4 favourite despite carrying 133 pounds over eleven furlongs. He struggled to obtain a clear run in the straight but "stayed on strongly" to win by just over a length from Sixties Groove. On his final appearance of the season he was matched against older horses and beaten a length by the four-year-old Central Square at Doncaster Racecourse in September.

=== 2017: four-year-old season ===
Poet's Word began his third campaign on the Polytrack at Chelmsford on 13 April when he started 8/11 favourite for a ten furlong handicap for which he was assigned 130 pounds. With Moore in the saddle he took the lead inside the final furlong and won "readily" by a length and a quarter from Intrude. The colt was then moved up to Group 3 level for the first time to contest the Huxley Stakes at Chester Racecourse in May and finished second, beaten a neck by the Aidan O'Brien-trained Deauville.

After a break of almost three months, Poet's Word returned on 4 August for the Group 3 Glorious Stakes over one and a half miles and started the 7/4 favourite against five opponents. Moore settled him in fourth before taking the lead approaching the final furlong and winning by one and a half lengths and a neck from Second Step (Grosser Preis von Berlin) and Scarlet Dragon. In September the colt was sent to Ireland and stepped up to Group 1 class for the Irish Champion Stakes over ten furlongs at Leopardstown Racecourse in which he was partnered by James Doyle. Starting at odds of 10/1 he was beaten half a length by the outsider Decorated Knight with Cliffs of Moher, Churchill and The Grey Gatsby among the unplaced finishers. In the Champion Stakes at Ascot Racecourse on 21 October, he proved no match for the winner Cracksman but took second place ahead of Highland Reel, Recoletos, Brametot, Cliffs of Moher and Barney Roy. For his final run of the year he was sent to Sha Tin Racecourse for the Hong Kong Cup on 10 December and finished sixth behind the locally trained Time Warp.

In the 2017 edition of the World's Best Racehorse Rankings Poet's Word was given a rating of 119, making him the 59th best racehorse in the world.

=== 2018: five-year-old season ===
Poet's Word began his fourth season with a trip to Dubai for the Sheema Classic at Meydan Racecourse in March. Ridden for the first time by Frankie Dettori he finished second of the ten runners, beaten three lengths by Hawkbill. On his return to Europe the horse started 4/6 favourite for the Brigadier Gerard Stakes over 10 furlongs at Sandown Park Racecourse on 24 May. He was positioned in second place by Moore before taking the lead entering the last quarter mile and "kept on well" to win by two and a quarter lengths from Laraaib. At Royal Ascot on 20 June Poet's Word started 11/2 second favourite behind Cracksman in a seven-runner field for the Group 1 Prince of Wales's Stakes which also included Hawkbill and Cliffs of Moher. After being restrained by James Doyle in fifth place he made a forward move approaching the straight, took the lead a furlong out and drew away from his rivals to win by two and a quarter lengths from Cracksman. His victory gave Stoute his 76th victory at Royal Ascot, making him the most successful trainer in the meeting's history. Stoute described the winner as "a very consistent, brave horse".

On 28 July Poet's Word, with Doyle in the saddle, was one of seven horses to contest the 68th running of the King George VI and Queen Elizabeth Stakes over one and a half miles at Ascot. He started the 7/4 second favourite behind his stablemate Crystal Ocean with the other fancied runners being Coronet, Hydrangea, Rostropovich (Dee Stakes), Salouen (runner-up in the Coronation Cup) and Desert Encounter. After racing towards the rear of the field, Poet's Word produced a sustained run on the outside in the straight, overhauled Crystal Ocean inside the final furlong, and won by a neck. His win was a record sixth in the race for Stoute, after Shergar, Opera House, Golan, Conduit and Harbinger. James Doyle commented "He's a true warrior. Everything he does, he's so professional and he responds really well. I just had to be patient... I had to be brave and attack late and he’s helped me out. He's the real star today".

Poet's Word was dropped back in distance at York on 22 August and started 8/5 favourite for the International Stakes in which he faced the leading three-year-olds Roaring Lion and Saxon Warrior. After tracking the leaders Doyle found himself boxed in when the field tracked right to race up the stands-side in the straight. He quickly obtained a clear run but was unable to make any impression on the leader Roaring Lion and was beaten just over three lengths into second place.

In September it was announced that Poet's Word had sustained an injury and would miss the rest of the season. He was officially retired from racing a month later.

In the 2018 World's Best Racehorse Rankings, Poet's Word was given a rating of 126, making him the 7th best racehorse in the world.

== Stud record ==
Poet's Word began his career as a breeding stallion at the Nunnery Stud in Norfolk.

== Pedigree ==
Pedigree of Poet's Word (IRE), bay horse, 2013
Sire Poet's Voice (GB) 2007	Dubawi (IRE); 2002	Dubai Millennium	Seeking The Gold
Sire Poet's Voice (GB) 2007	Dubawi (IRE); 2002	Dubai Millennium	Colorado Dancer
Sire Poet's Voice (GB) 2007	Dubawi (IRE); 2002	Zomaradah	Deploy
Sire Poet's Voice (GB) 2007	Dubawi (IRE); 2002	Zomaradah	Jawaher
Sire Poet's Voice (GB) 2007	Bright Tiara (USA); 1989	Chief's Crown	Danzig
Sire Poet's Voice (GB) 2007	Bright Tiara (USA); 1989	Chief's Crown	Six Crowns
Sire Poet's Voice (GB) 2007	Bright Tiara (USA); 1989	Expressive Dance	Riva Ridge
Sire Poet's Voice (GB) 2007	Bright Tiara (USA); 1989	Expressive Dance	Exclusive Dancer
Dam Whirly Bird (GB) 2001	Nashwan (USA); 1986	Blushing Groom	Red God
Dam Whirly Bird (GB) 2001	Nashwan (USA); 1986	Blushing Groom	Runaway Bride
Dam Whirly Bird (GB) 2001	Nashwan (USA); 1986	Height of Fashion	Bustino
Dam Whirly Bird (GB) 2001	Nashwan (USA); 1986	Height of Fashion	Highclere
Dam Whirly Bird (GB) 2001	Inchyre (GB); 1993	Shirley Heights	Mill Reef
Dam Whirly Bird (GB) 2001	Inchyre (GB); 1993	Shirley Heights	Hardiemma
Dam Whirly Bird (GB) 2001	Inchyre (GB); 1993	Inchmurrin	Lomond
Dam Whirly Bird (GB) 2001	Inchyre (GB); 1993	Inchmurrin	On Show (Family 7-a)
