= Alhaarth =

Irish-bred Thoroughbred racehorse

- Racing colours of Hamdan Al Maktoum
- Sire: Unfuwain
- Grandsire: Northern Dancer
- Dam: Irish Valley
- Damsire: Irish River
- Sex: Stallion
- Foaled: 7 March 1993
- Country: Ireland
- Colour: Bay
- Breeder: Shadwell Estates Co Ltd
- Owner: Hamdan Al Maktoum; Godolphin Racing
- Trainer: Dick Hern; Saeed bin Suroor
- Record: 17: 8-2-3
- Earnings: £372,241

Major wins
- Vintage Stakes (1995); Solario Stakes (1995); Champagne Stakes (1995); Dewhurst Stakes (1995); Prix du Rond Point (1996); International Stakes (Ireland) (1997); Prix Dollar (1997)

Awards
- Cartier Champion Two-year-old Colt (1995)
- Last updated on August 25, 2007

Alhaarth (24 February 1993 – 29 July 2015) was a champion Thoroughbred racehorse and sire, bred in Ireland, but trained in the United Kingdom and Dubai during a racing career that lasted from 1995 to 1997. He was named European Champion Two-Year-Old at the 1995 Cartier Racing Awards. In his championship season he won all five of his races including the Group One Dewhurst Stakes and three other Group races. He went on to win the Prix du Rond Point at three and the International Stakes (Ireland) and Prix Dollar as a four-year-old. After his retirement he became a successful stallion.

== Background ==
Alhaarth was a bay horse with a white blaze standing 16 hands high, was bred in Ireland by his owner Hamdan Al Maktoum's Shadwell Stud. He was sired by Unfuwain out of the mare Irish Valley. Unfuwain was a high-class middle-distance runner who won four Group races before siring the winners of more than five hundred winners at stud. Irish Valley, who never raced, was a half-sister to the Poule d'Essai des Poulains winner and Champion sire Green Dancer and in addition to Alhaarth, produced the Prix du Calvados winner, Green Pola.

Alhaarth was originally sent into training with Dick Hern at West Ilsley. At the end of his three-year-old season, he was transferred to the Godolphin team and moved to the stable of Saeed bin Suroor. He was ridden in ten of his first eleven races by Willie Carson, who retired at the end of the 1996 season: Alhaarth's Dewhurst victory was Carson's last Group One win in Britain. Alhaarth means "the tiller" in Arabic.

== Racing career ==
=== 1995: two-year-old season ===
Alhaarth made his debut in a maiden race at Newmarket in July. He showed his inexperience ("ran green") but took the lead inside the final furlong to win by a neck from the future Classic winner Mark of Esteem. Two weeks later he was moved into Group Three class for the Vintage Stakes at Glorious Goodwood. Alhaarth started odds-on favourite and after tracking the leaders he recovered from being hampered in the straight to win by a length from Allied Forces.

In the Solario Stakes at Sandown in August, Alhaarth started at 30/100 and won comfortably, beating Staffin by three lengths. The Independent's correspondent praised his balance, "authority" and "exceptional stride", whilst bookmakers offered him at 16/1 for the 2000 Guineas and 8/1 for the Derby. Only two colts took on Alhaarth in the Champagne Stakes. He won again, beating Rio Duvida at odds of 2/5, but the lack of pace and weak opposition meant that the race proved little.

On his final start of the season, Alhaarth was sent to Newmarket for Britain's most prestigious two-year-old race, the Group One Dewhurst Stakes. Only three colts opposed Alhaarth, but they included the Prix Morny winner Tagula, and the unbeaten Danehill Dancer, winner of the Phoenix Stakes and the National Stakes. Alhaarth tracked the pacemaker Albaha, before moving into the lead three furlongs out. He soon went clear and recorded an "impressive" win, beating Danehill Dancer by two and a half lengths. Hern called the "demolition" of Danehill Dancer as a "great performance" and described Alhaarth as the best two-year-old he had trained while the senior handicapper Geoffrey Gibbs called the win "very authoritative" and suggested that Alhaarth was on the way to becoming a great horse. His price for the Guineas was as cut to as low as 2/1.

=== 1996: three-year-old season ===
Alhaarth began 1996 as the short-priced favourite for both the 2000 Guineas and the Derby although Hern was reported to be concerned by the colt's lack of physical growth. Alhaarth lost his unbeaten record on his three-year-old debut. He started 1/2 favourite for the Craven Stakes over a mile at Newmarket, but after taking the lead, he was caught in the closing stages and beaten a neck by Beauchamp King. Hern spoke positively after the race, saying "that will have done him good" but reportedly looked as despondent as "a man who had just had his tomatoes visited by blight". Despite the defeat, Alhaarth started 2/1 favourite for the 2000 Guineas over the same course and distance just over two weeks later after doing well in an exercise gallop. He was held up in the early stages, but when asked to challenge he was unable to reach the leaders, and finished fourth, six lengths behind Mark of Esteem.

Alhaarth was moved up to middle distances for his next two starts. In The Derby, he finished fifth behind Shaamit after meeting interference in running, but in the Irish Derby he came home ninth of the thirteen runners behind Zagreb.

A return to one mile saw him take third places in the Sussex Stakes and the Celebration Mile before he was sent to France for the Prix du Rond Point at Longchamp on Arc day in October. Ridden by Richard Hills, Alhaarth led from the start and stayed on strongly to record his first victory in almost a year, beating the 1995 winner of the race, Shaanxi, by one and a half lengths. The victory was greeted enthusiastically by the British contingent, and Hern said that the performance gave him "great pleasure, because I know what a good horse he is."

=== 1997: four-year-old season ===
Alhaarth joined the Godolphin stable and spent the winter of 1996–7 in Dubai. He did not run however, until Royal Ascot, where he ran second to Bosra Sham in the Prince of Wales's Stakes. Twelve days later, he traveled to Ireland to win the Group Two Budweiser American Bowl International Stakes, taking the lead a furlong out to beat Gothenberg by a length.

His next two starts were disappointing: he finished last of the nine runners in the Celebration Mile in August and a remote third, beaten more than 18 lengths behind Pilsudski in the Irish Champion Stakes.

On his final start, Alhaarth returned to Longchamp in October in the Group Two Prix Dollar. He led from the start and was always "in command", winning by a length from Lord Cromby.

== Assessment ==
Alhaarth was rated the best two-year-old to run in Europe during 1995, being awarded a rating of 126 in the International Classification, two pounds ahead of the Middle Park Stakes winner, Royal Applause.

He was also named European Champion Two-Year-Old Colt at the Cartier Racing Awards for 1995.

== Stud career ==
Since his retirement, Alhaarth has stood at Hamdan Al Maktoum's Irish base at the Derrinstown Stud, County Kildare. He has sired the winners of more than 500 races, including Haafhd, Awzaan, Bandari (six Group races), and Phoenix Reach Pensioned in April 2013 due to a cardiac condition. Died on 29 July 2015.

== Pedigree ==
Pedigree of Alhaarth
Sire Unfuwain	Northern Dancer	Nearctic	Nearco
Sire Unfuwain	Northern Dancer	Nearctic	Lady Angela
Sire Unfuwain	Northern Dancer	Natalma	Native Dancer
Sire Unfuwain	Northern Dancer	Natalma	Almahmoud
Sire Unfuwain	Height of Fashion	Bustino	Busted
Sire Unfuwain	Height of Fashion	Bustino	Ship Yard
Sire Unfuwain	Height of Fashion	Highclere	Queen's Hussar
Sire Unfuwain	Height of Fashion	Highclere	Highlight
Dam Irish Valley	Irish River	Riverman	Never Bend
Dam Irish Valley	Irish River	Riverman	River Lady
Dam Irish Valley	Irish River	Irish Star	Klairon
Dam Irish Valley	Irish River	Irish Star	Botany Bay
Dam Irish Valley	Green Valley	Val de Loir	Vieux Manoir
Dam Irish Valley	Green Valley	Val de Loir	Vali
Dam Irish Valley	Green Valley	Sly Pola	Spy Song
Dam Irish Valley	Green Valley	Sly Pola	Ampola (Family 16-c)
