= Al Kazeem =

British-bred Thoroughbred racehorse

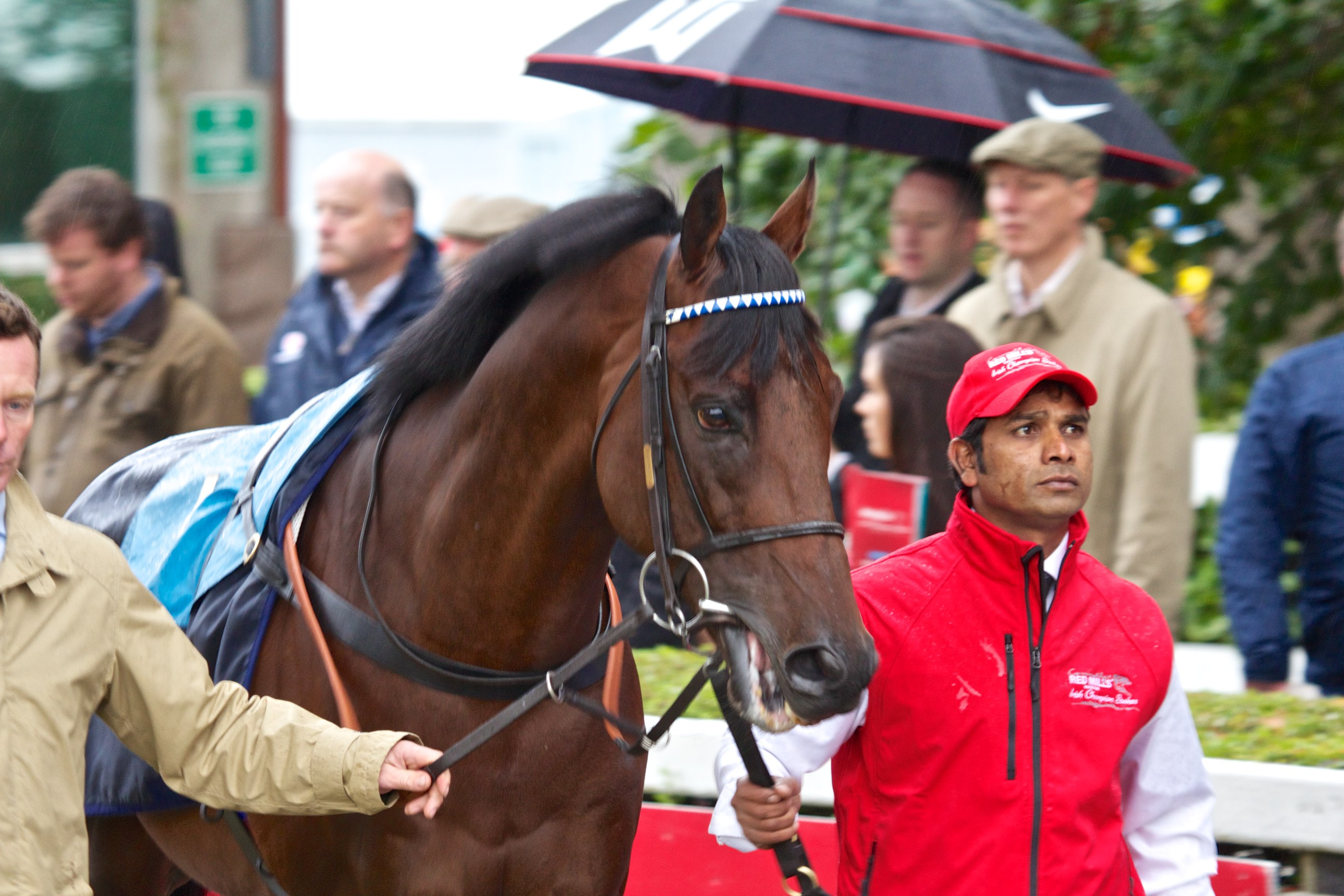
- Al Kazeem at Leopardstown in September 2013.
- Sire: Dubawi
- Grandsire: Dubai Millennium
- Dam: Kazeem
- Damsire: Darshaan
- Sex: Stallion
- Foaled: 15 April 2008
- Country: United Kingdom
- Colour: Bay
- Breeder: D J & Mrs Deer
- Owner: John Deer
- Trainer: Roger Charlton
- Record: 23: 10-7-1
- Earnings: £1,573,596

Major wins
- Jockey Club Stakes (2012); Gordon Richards Stakes (2013); Tattersalls Gold Cup (2013, 2015); Prince of Wales's Stakes (2013); Eclipse Stakes (2013); Winter Hill Stakes (2014); Prix d'Harcourt (2015)

Al Kazeem (foaled 15 April 2008) is a British Thoroughbred racehorse. He showed promise as a two-year-old in 2010 and became a consistently successful performer in the following year. In 2012 he won the Jockey Club Stakes on his seasonal debut but was then sidelined by a pelvic fracture for almost a year. In 2013 he won the Gordon Richards Stakes on his comeback and then took three consecutive Group One races: the Tattersalls Gold Cup, Prince of Wales's Stakes and Eclipse Stakes. After proving subfertile in his first season at Sandringham Stud, he returned to racing in 2014 to win the Winter Hill Stakes and finish a close second in the Champion Stakes. He began his 2015 season by winning the Prix d'Harcourt and went on to win a second Tattersalls Gold Cup before being retired for the second time in August after picking up a minor injury. He stands at Oakgrove Stud in South Wales.

== Background ==
Al Kazeem is a dark-coated bay horse with a faint white star bred by his owner, John Deer. He was sired by Dubawi a top-class son of Dubai Millennium, whose wins included the Irish 2,000 Guineas and the Prix Jacques Le Marois. At stud, Dubawi has been a highly-successful breeding stallion, siring major winners such as Monterosso, Makfi, Lucky Nine and Poet's Voice. Al Kazeem's dam, Kazeem, failed to win at race, but came from a good family, being a daughter of the Princess Elizabeth Stakes winner Kanz who was closely related to several major winners including Tank's Prospect, Glint of Gold, Diamond Shoal and Ensconse.

Deer sent his colt into training with Roger Charlton at Beckhampton in Wiltshire.

== Racing career ==
=== 2010: two-year-old season ===
Al Kazeem made his racecourse debut on 7 October in a one-mile maiden race at Newbury Racecourse. Ridden by Steve Drowne he finished fifth of the seventeen runners behind Fulgur. Sixteen days later, over the same course and distance, he recorded his first success when he won a similar event by a length from Thimaar.

=== 2011: three-year-old season ===
On his first appearance of 2011, Al Kazeem finished second to Cai Shen in a ten furlong race at Newbury. On 14 May over the same course and distance, the colt carried top weight of 130 pounds in the London Gold Cup, a handicap race for three-year-olds. He quickened clear in the closing stages and won by one and a quarter lengths at odds of 9/2.

After a break of three months, Al Kazeem returned at York Racecourse in August when he was moved up in class for the Group Two Great Voltigeur Stakes. He finished second of the eight runners, eight lengths behind the winner Sea Moon. In September he returned to Newbury for the eleven furlong Arc Trial. He took the lead two furlongs from the finish but was caught in the closing strides and was beaten half a length by Green Destiny. On his final race of the year, Al Kazeem started favourite for the St Simon Stakes at Newbury in which he finished second to the gelding Beaten Up.

=== 2012: four-year-old season ===
On his first and only appearance as a four-year-old, Al Kazeem contested the Jockey Club Stakes over one and a half miles at Newmarket. Ridden by James Doyle, he took the lead a furlong from the finish and drew clear to win by four and a half lengths from a field which included the Group One winners Dunaden, Meandre and Masked Marvel. Shortly after this race Al Kazeem sustained a hairline fracture to his pelvis and was unable to race again in 2012.

=== 2013: five-year-old season ===
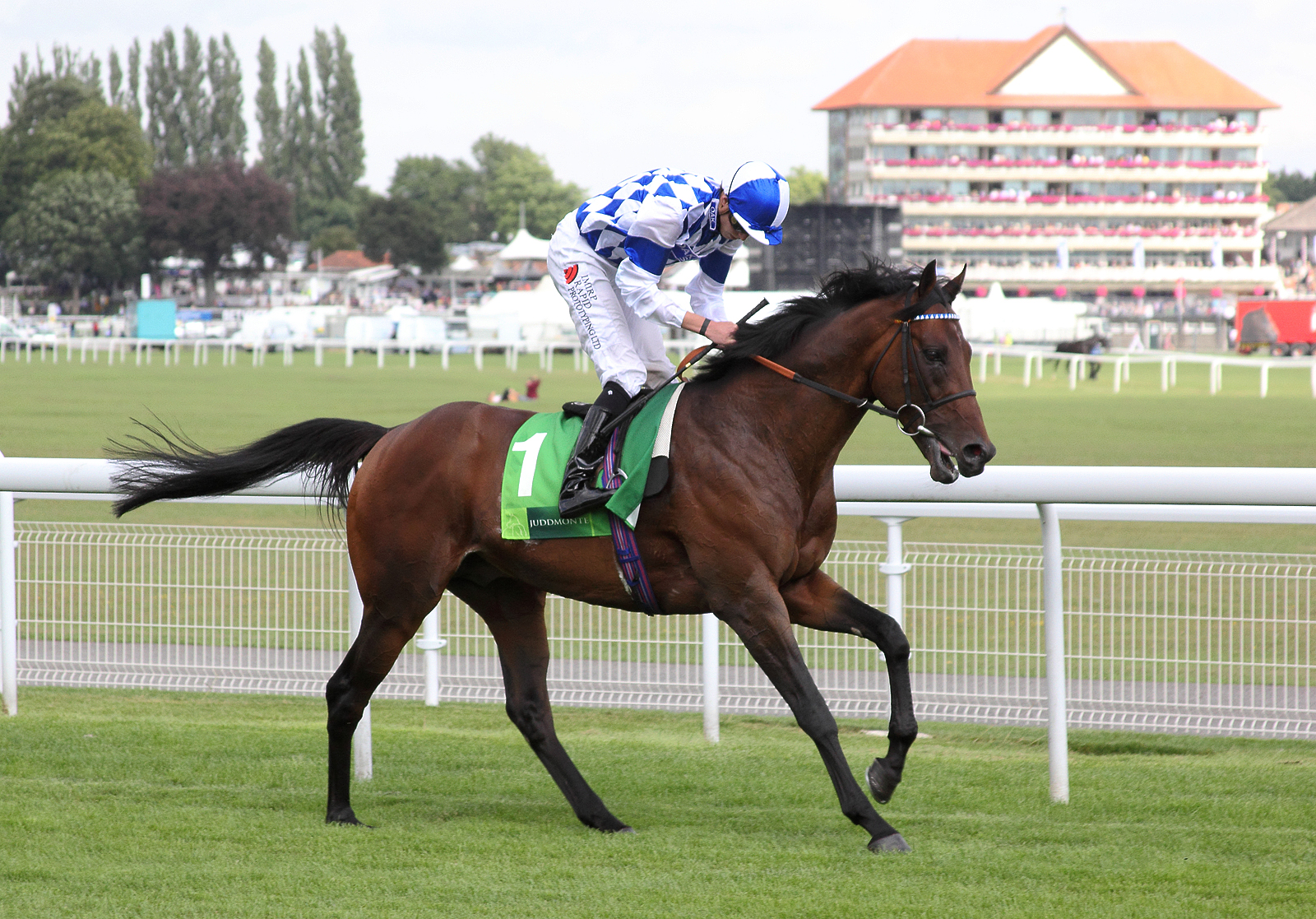
Al Kazeem at York, 2013

In his first race for almost a year, Al Kazeem started 9/4 favourite for the Gordon Richards Stakes at Sandown Park Racecourse. He won by a length from the Henry Cecil-trained Thomas Chippendale, despite edging to the right in the closing stages. On 26 May, Al Kazeem was sent to Ireland where he was matched against the 2012 Epsom Derby winner Camelot in the Tattersalls Gold Cup. Doyle held the colt up at the back of the four runner field before moving forward in the straight. He overtook Camelot 100 yards from the finish to take his first Group One race by one and a half lengths. The win gave his jockey, James Doyle, his first win in Ireland and his second at Group One level following his win on the Charlton-trained Cityscape in the 2012 Dubai Duty Free Stakes. Doyle explained that Charlton had always believed that the horse would return to form, and said that "at the two-furlong pole I couldn't believe how well we were travelling – I was having to take him back."

On 19 June Al Kazeem faced Camelot again in the Prince of Wales's Stakes at Royal Ascot, in a field which also included the 2012 European Champion Three-Year-Old Filly The Fugue, the Hong Kong Vase winner Red Cadeaux and the Prix d'Ispahan winner Maxios. Doyle positioned the 11/4 second favourite behind the leaders before moving forward in the straight. The four-year-old Mukhadram opened up a three length lead, but Al Kazeem steadily reduced the deficit before taking the lead in the closing strides and winning by a neck. The Fugue beat Camelot for third, with Maxios fifth and Red Cadeaux ninth of the eleven runners. After the race, Charlton described Al Kazeem as the best horse he had ever trained (including the Derby winner Quest for Fame) and suggested the Eclipse Stakes, the King George VI and Queen Elizabeth Stakes and the Prix de l'Arc de Triomphe as future targets. On 6 July Al Kazeem started 15/8 favourite for the Eclipse Stakes at Sandown. He was again opposed by Mukhdaram and The Fugue, as well as the Queen Anne Stakes winner Declaration of War from Ireland and the Prix Ganay winner Pastorius from Germany. Doyle settled the favourite in third place before moving forward to overtake Mukhdaram just inside the final furlong. At this point, Al Kazeem veered right towards the rail and seriously hampering Mukhdaram, but the favourite prevailed by two lengths from Declaration of War, with Mukhdaram dropping back to third. A steward's enquiry allowed the result to stand, but Doyle was given a five-day ban for careless riding.

Charlton decided not to let his horse run in the King George VI and Queen Elizabeth Stakes at Ascot in July. Al Kazeem next appeared in the International Stakes at York Racecourse on 20 August. He started the 11/8 favourite, but his winning run came to an end as he was beaten into third place by Declaration of War and Trading Leather. Al Kazeem faced Trading Leather again in the Irish Champion Stakes at Leopardstown Racecourse on 7 September. Racing on soft ground, he started the 9/10 favourite and overcame Trading Leather, but was beaten one and a quarter lengths by The Fugue. On 6 October Al Kazeem ended his season in the Prix de l'Arc de Triomphe at Longchamp. He was drawn on the wide outside of the eighteen runners and started a 19/1 outsider. Doyle attempted to track across to the inside, but had problems obtaining a clear run before finishing well to take sixth place behind Treve. Before the race it had been announced that Al Kazeem had been sold and would be retired from racing to become a breeding stallion at the Royal Stud at Sandingham in 2014.

=== 2014: six-year-old season ===
In May 2014 it was announced that Al Kazeem had proved to be "subfertile" at stud and was being returned to training to resume his career as a racehorse. His not reaching the required fertility levels became the subject of an insurance claim.

Al Kazeem's first comeback race was the Listed Steventon Stakes over ten furlongs at Newbury on 19 July. Starting the 11/10 favourite he briefly took second place in the straight but could make no further progress and finished fourth of the ten runner behind Amralah. On 23 August the horse started 8/11 favourite for the Group Three Winter Hill Stakes at Windsor Racecourse. Ridden by George Baker, he overtook the three-year-old True Story in the final furlong and won by half a length. The horse was moved back up to Group One class for the Irish Champion Stakes on 13 September. He started 10/1 third favourite but finished fifth to The Grey Gatsby, beaten almost seven lengths by the winner. In the Prix de l'Arc de Triomphe on 5 October, Al Kazeem started a 66/1 outsider and finished tenth, five and three quarter lengths behind the winner Treve. Two weeks later, the horse started at odds of 16/1 for the Champion Stakes over ten furlongs at Ascot. Ridden by George Baker, he raced in second place for most of the way before moving alongside the leader Noble Mission in the straight. He took a narrow advantage inside the final furlong but after a "tremendous battle" finished second by a neck. The other beaten horses included Free Eagle, Cirrus des Aigles, and Ruler of the World. After the race Charlton said "I am almost emotional. He's a wonderful horse to deal with. He's done everything I've asked of him. He's never acted like a stallion since he has returned. I think he is back to his best."

=== 2015: seven-year-old season ===
Al Kazeem began his sixth season in the Group Two Prix d'Harcourt on heavy ground at Longchamp on 6 April and started 11/5 favourite ahead of Free Port Lux (Prix Hocquart, Prix du Prince d'Orange) and Smoking Sun (winner of the race in 2014). Ridden for the first time by Ryan Moore, he took the lead 300 metres from the finish and won by three quarters of a length from Affaire Solitaire. A month later he started favourite for the Prix Ganay but was beaten into second place by the nine-year-old veteran Cirrus des Aigles. On 24 May, Al Kazeem attempted to repeat his 2013 success in the Tattersalls Gold Cup and started joint-second favourite behind The Grey Gatsby in a field which also included the Great Voltigeur Stakes winner Postponed and Fascinating Rock (Derrinstown Stud Derby Trial, Mooresbridge Stakes). James Doyle tracked the leader Postponed before taking the lead entering the final and Al Kazeem held on to win by a neck from Fascinating Rock. Al Kazeem returned from Ireland with an injury to his foreleg and missed an intended run at Royal Ascot. On 4 August it was announced that although Al Kazeem had recovered from his injury he would not race again as John Deer did not want to risk the horse's wellbeing by extending his racing career. Charlton commented "Al Kazeem has been a pleasure to train from start to finish and he has had a remarkable career... He was a gentleman from the outset, full of class and tough as they come... we will miss him greatly."

== Stud career ==
Al Kazeem began stud duties in 2014. He currently stands as a stallion at Oakgrove Stud in Chepstow at a private fee.

=== Notable progeny ===
c = colt, f = filly, g = gelding

Foaled	Name	Sex	Major wins
2015	Aspetar	g	Preis von Europa

== Pedigree ==
Pedigree of Al Kazeem (GB), bay horse, 2008
Sire Dubawi (IRE) 2002	Dubai Millennium (GB); 1996	Seeking the Gold	Mr. Prospector
Sire Dubawi (IRE) 2002	Dubai Millennium (GB); 1996	Seeking the Gold	Con Game
Sire Dubawi (IRE) 2002	Dubai Millennium (GB); 1996	Colorado Dancer	Shareef Dancer
Sire Dubawi (IRE) 2002	Dubai Millennium (GB); 1996	Colorado Dancer	Fall Aspen
Sire Dubawi (IRE) 2002	Zomaradah (GB); 1995	Deploy	Shirley Heights
Sire Dubawi (IRE) 2002	Zomaradah (GB); 1995	Deploy	Slightly Dangerous
Sire Dubawi (IRE) 2002	Zomaradah (GB); 1995	Jawaher	Dancing Brave
Sire Dubawi (IRE) 2002	Zomaradah (GB); 1995	Jawaher	High Tern
Dam Kazeem (GB) 1998	Darshaan (GB); 1981	Shirley Heights	Mill Reef
Dam Kazeem (GB) 1998	Darshaan (GB); 1981	Shirley Heights	Hardiemma
Dam Kazeem (GB) 1998	Darshaan (GB); 1981	Delsy	Abdos
Dam Kazeem (GB) 1998	Darshaan (GB); 1981	Delsy	Kelty
Dam Kazeem (GB) 1998	Kanz (USA); 1981	The Minstrel	Northern Dancer
Dam Kazeem (GB) 1998	Kanz (USA); 1981	The Minstrel	Fleur
Dam Kazeem (GB) 1998	Kanz (USA); 1981	Treasure Chest	Rough 'n Tumble
Dam Kazeem (GB) 1998	Kanz (USA); 1981	Treasure Chest	Iltis (Family: 21-a)

- Al Kazeem is inbred 3 × 4 to Shirley Heights, meaning that this stallion appears in both the third and fourth generations of his pedigree.
