= Joel Stakes =

Flat horse race in Britain

- Class: Group 2
- Location: Rowley Mile; Newmarket, England
- Inaugurated: 1987
- Race type: Flat / Thoroughbred
- Sponsor: BoyleSports
- Website: Newmarket

Race information
- Distance: 1 mile (1,609 metres)
- Surface: Turf
- Track: Straight
- Qualification: Three-years-old and up
- Weight: 9 st 2 lb (3yo); 9 st 6 lb (4yo+); Allowances; 3 lb for fillies and mares Penalties; 5 lb for Group 1 winners * 3 lb for Group 2 winners * * since 31 March
- Purse: £125,000 (2025); 1st: £65,216

Joel Stakes
2026
Talk Of New York	The Lost King	Persica

Previous years
2025
Zeus Olympios	Opera Ballo	Detain
2024
Prague	Poker Face	Task Force
2023
Mutasaabeq	Regal Reality	Chindit
2022
Mutasaabeq	El Drama	Tempus
2021
Benbatl	Pogo	Master Of The Seas

2020-2011
2020
Kameko	Regal Reality	Benbatl
2019
Benbatl	King Of Comedy	Zaaki
2018
Mustashry	Zabeel Prince	Regal Reality
2017
Beat The Bank	Sir John Lavery	Jallota
2016
Cougar Mountain	Gifted Master	Nathra
2015
Time Test	Custom Cut	Decorated Knight
2014
Custom Cut	Captain Cat	Hors De Combat
2013
Soft Falling Rain	Montiridge	Premio Loco
2012
Penitent	Side Glance	Premio Loco
2011
Ransom Note	Premio Loco	Poet's Voice

2010-2001
2010
Cityscape	Penitent	Fair Trade
2009
Confront	Rio De La Plata	Forgotten Voice
2008
Eagle Mountain	Bankable	Ordnance Row
2007
Creachadoir	Tell	Heaven Sent
2006
Satchem	Pinson	Road To Love
2005
Rob Roy	Ancient World	Polar Ben
2004
Polar Ben	Salselon	Funfair
2003
Splendid Era	Kalaman	Muqbil
2002
Desert Deer	Masterful	Sohaib
2001
Beckett	Priors Lodge	Aldebaran

2000-1991
2000
Hopeful Light	On The Ridge	El Gran Papa
1999
Indian Lodge	Ras Shaikh	Sunstreak
1998
Im Proposin	Generous Rosi	Illusion
1997
Intikhab	Swiss Law	Polish Rhythm
1996
Yeast	Restructure	Tamnia
1995
Bin Rosie	Red Carnival	Airport
1994
Fraam	Glatisant	Hazaam
1993
Gabr	Wharf	En Attendant
1992
Inner City	Soiree	John Rose
1991
Rudimentary	Cruachan	Lifewatch Vision

1990-1988
1990
Raj Waki	Lifewatch Vision	Theatrical Charmer
1989
Sabotage	Charmer	Hello Vaigly
1988
Hibernian Gold	Nemesia	Known Charter

The Joel Stakes is a Group 2 flat horse race in Great Britain open to horses aged three years or older. It is run on the Rowley Mile at Newmarket over a distance of 1 mile (1,609 metres), and it is scheduled to take place each year in late September.

== History ==
The event was established in 1987, and it was originally called the Main Reef Stakes. It was named after Main Reef, a successful horse owned and bred by Jim Joel. It was initially restricted to three-year-olds and contested over 1 mile and 2 furlongs.

The race was opened to older horses and cut to a mile in 1989. For a period it was classed at Listed level. Jim Joel died in 1992, and it was renamed the Joel Stakes in 1994.

The Joel Stakes was promoted to Group 3 status in 2003. The Shadwell breeding organisation became its sponsor in 2008, and its full title included the name of Nayef, a Shadwell stallion for a period. It was upgraded to Group 2 in 2011.

The race is currently held on the second day of Newmarket's three-day Cambridgeshire Meeting, the day before the Cambridgeshire Handicap.

== Records ==
Most successful horse (2 wins):

- Benbatl - (2019,2021)
- Mutasaabeq - (2022,2023)

Leading jockey (4 wins):

- Oisin Murphy – Beat The Bank (2017), Benbatl (2019,2021), Kameko (2020)

Leading trainer (4 wins):

- Sir Michael Stoute – Sabotage (1989), Rob Roy (2005), Confront (2009), Mustashry (2018)
- Saeed bin Suroor - Satchem (2006), Creachadoir (2007), Benbatl (2019,2021)

== Winners ==
Year	Winner	Age	Jockey	Trainer	Time
1987	Lockton	3	Michael Hills	Jeremy Hindley	2:06.88
1988	Hibernian Gold	3	Greville Starkey	Guy Harwood	2:06.10
1989	Sabotage	3	Walter Swinburn	Michael Stoute	1:43.13
1990	Raj Waki	3	Michael Kinane	Guy Harwood	1:36.93
1991	Rudimentary	3	Pat Eddery	Henry Cecil	1:36.55
1992	Inner City	3	Frankie Dettori	Luca Cumani	1:37.50
1993	Gabr	3	Willie Carson	Robert Armstrong	1:42.41
1994	Fraam	5	Walter Swinburn	Alex Scott	1:36.05
1995	Bin Rosie	3	Kevin Darley	David Loder	1:36.24
1996	Yeast	4	Ray Cochrane	William Haggas	1:37.43
1997	Intikhab	3	Richard Hills	David Morley	1:38.09
1998	Im Proposin	3	Richard Quinn	John Dunlop	1:42.02
1999 (Note: The 1999 race was run on the July Course at Newmarket)	Indian Lodge	3	Michael Roberts	Amanda Perrett	1:39.00
2000	Hopeful Light	3	Jimmy Fortune	John Gosden	1:40.39
2001	Beckett	3	Michael Kinane	Aidan O'Brien	1:38.54
2002	Desert Deer	4	Kevin Darley	Mark Johnston	1:34.54
2003	Splendid Era	3	Michael Hills	Barry Hills	1:37.40
2004	Polar Ben	5	Johnny Murtagh	James Fanshawe	1:37.33
2005	Rob Roy	3	Michael Kinane	Sir Michael Stoute	1:39.22
2006	Satchem	4	Kerrin McEvoy	Saeed bin Suroor	1:39.95
2007	Creachadoir	3	Kerrin McEvoy	Saeed bin Suroor	1:36.68
2008	Eagle Mountain	4	Kevin Shea	Mike de Kock	1:34.07
2009	Confront	4	Ryan Moore	Sir Michael Stoute	1:36.18
2010	Cityscape	4	Steve Drowne	Roger Charlton	1:39.84
2011	Ransom Note	4	Michael Hills	Charles Hills	1:34.68
2012	Penitent	6	Daniel Tudhope	David O'Meara	1:36.32
2013	Soft Falling Rain	4	Paul Hanagan	Mike de Kock	1:37.20
2014	Custom Cut	5	Daniel Tudhope	David O'Meara	1:35.66
2015	Time Test	3	Ryan Moore	Roger Charlton	1:35.84
2016	Cougar Mountain	5	Ryan Moore	Aidan O'Brien	1:36.85
2017	Beat The Bank	3	Oisin Murphy	Andrew Balding	1:38.67
2018	Mustashry	5	Jim Crowley	Sir Michael Stoute	1:36.89
2019	Benbatl	5	Oisin Murphy	Saeed bin Suroor	1:35.60
2020	Kameko	3	Oisin Murphy	Andrew Balding	1:34.41
2021	Benbatl	7	Oisin Murphy	Saeed bin Suroor	1:34.56
2022	Mutasaabeq	4	Jim Crowley	Charles Hills	1:38.43
2023	Mutasaabeq	5	Jim Crowley	Charles Hills	1:34.71
2024	Prague	4	Daniel Tudhope	Dylan Cunha	1:40.53
2025	Zeus Olympios	3	Clifford Lee	Karl Burke	1:37.57
2026	Talk Of New York	3	William Buick	Charlie Appleby	1:34.30

== See also ==
- Horse racing in Great Britain
- List of British flat horse races
- Recurring sporting events established in 1987 – this race is included under its original title, Main Reef Stakes.
