= James Doyle (jockey) =

English racing jockey

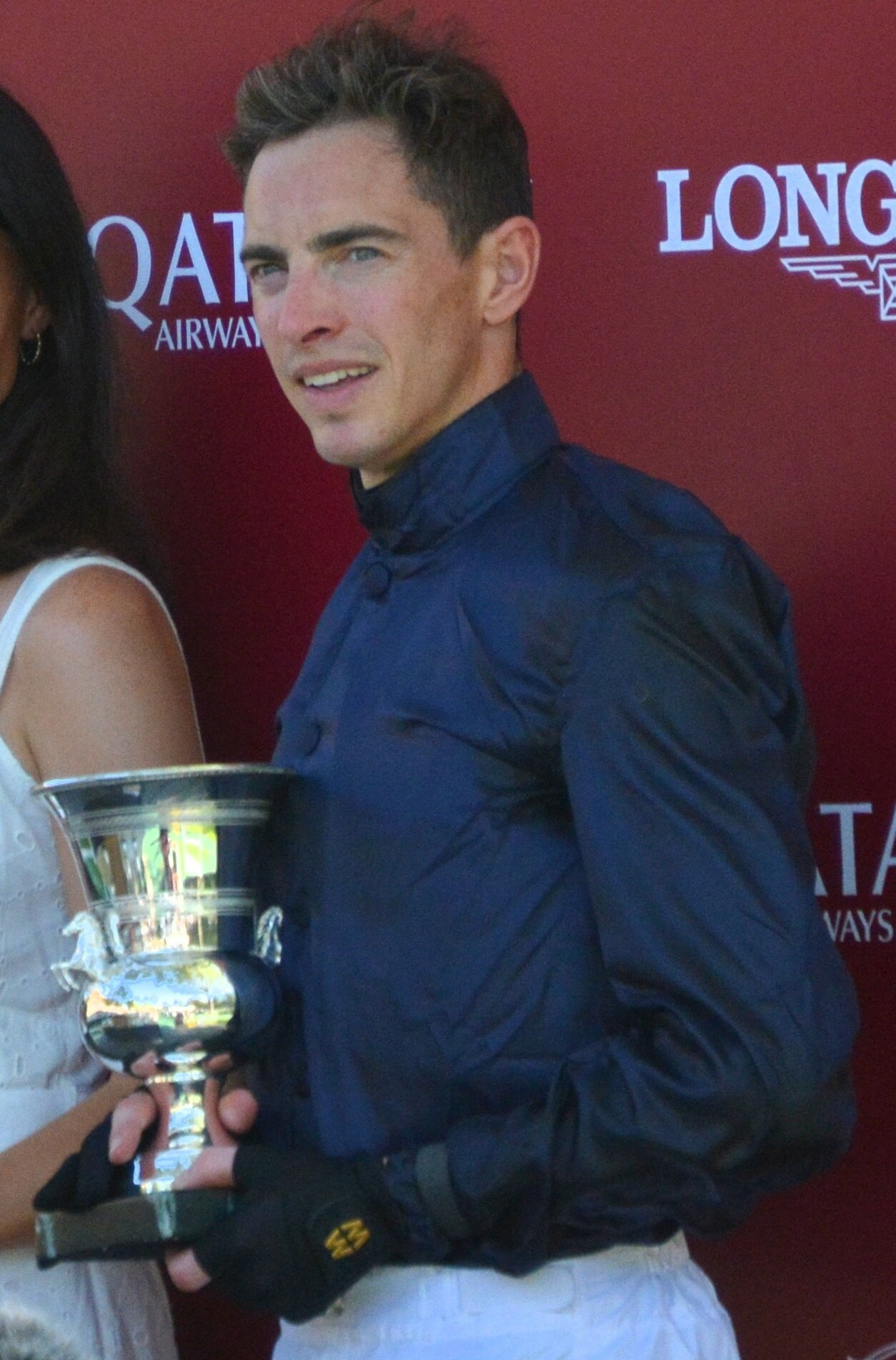
- James Doyle (Prix Vermeille, 2023)

Personal information
- Born: 22 April 1988 (age 38) Cambridge
- Occupation: Jockey

Horse racing career
- Sport: Horse racing

Major racing wins
- Dubai Duty Free Stakes (2012); Tattersalls Gold Cup (2013, 2014, 2015); Ascot Gold Cup (2017); Prince of Wales's Stakes (2013, 2018); Eclipse Stakes (2013); Moyglare Stud Stakes (2013); Irish 2,000 Guineas (2014); St James's Palace Stakes (2014, 2017); Sussex Stakes (2014); Champion Stakes (2014); Lockinge Stakes (2015); Falmouth Stakes (2015); Irish Oaks (2018); King George VI and Queen Elizabeth Stakes (2018); Al Quoz Sprint (2018); Jebel Hatta (2018); Sir Rupert Clarke Stakes (2018); King's Stand Stakes (2019); Diamond Jubilee Stakes (2019); 2000 Guineas Stakes (2022); 1000 Guineas Stakes (2022)

Significant horses
- Sea of Class, Al Kazeem, Cityscape, Kingman, Noble Mission, Rizeena, Night of Thunder, Rebel's Romance

James Doyle (born 22 April 1988) is an English flat racing jockey. From 2014 to 2023, he was one of the retained riders to Godolphin Racing. In 2024, he left Godolphin to ride as first jockey for the Emir of Qatar's Wathnan Racing.

== Early life ==
Doyle was born in Cambridge and is the son of former trainer Jacqueline Doyle and younger brother of jockey Sophie Doyle. Jacqueline trained Zanay, who won the Winter Derby in 2000.

== Riding career ==
=== Early career ===
Doyle had his first ride under rules on 4 June 2004 at Goodwood, finishing unplaced in a handicap for amateur riders on Somayda, who was trained by his mother. He rode his first winner on 1 June 2005 at Wolverhampton on the Richard Price trained Farnborough.

During 2005, he had eight wins, four of which came on Fabrian, who was also trained by Richard Price. During 2006 he rode 73 winners, with 32 of those being on turf, including the totesport Stakes Heritage Handicap at Windsor, which he won with One More Round, trained by Nick Littmoden. During 2007 and 2008 he rode 41 and 53 winners respectively. The following two years he did not reach 30 winners in a season, finishing with totals of 28 and 29, and had half the number of rides that he had back in 2006. After struggling to get enough rides, Doyle revealed that he contemplated going on a plumbing course in 2010. During 2011, Doyle was booked for many more rides than he had been for the previous two years and at the end of the year had won 76 races in Britain, and had also started riding for Wiltshire trainer Roger Charlton. In the winter of 2011, Doyle rode in the UAE, winning his first listed race when he took the President Cup on 18 December, riding Jaasoos for Dhruba Selvaratnam.

=== Roger Charlton 2012–2013 ===
Doyle became stable jockey to Roger Charlton in 2012, and on 31 March, scored his first Group 1 success, when he rode Charlton's Cityscape to win the Dubai Duty Free Stakes by over four lengths. Al Kazeem, trained by Charlton, provided Doyle with his first British group race success when he won the Group 2 Jockey Club Stakes at Newmarket on 5 May 2012. The following season, Al Kazeem won the Irish Group 1 Tattersalls Gold Cup at the Curragh and then went on to win the Prince of Wales's Stakes at Royal Ascot on 19 June 2013, giving Doyle his first British Group 1 success, his first Royal Ascot winner, and the first leg of a treble on the day. There were two more Group 1 wins for Doyle in 2013, with Al Kazeem winning the Eclipse Stakes at Sandown and Rizeena, trained by Clive Brittain, winning the Moyglare Stud Stakes at the Curragh.

=== Juddmonte 2013–2014 ===
In August 2013, Doyle was appointed as retained jockey for Khalid Abdullah's Juddmonte. There was an early success for the association when two-year-old Kingman, trained by John Gosden, won the Group 3 Solario Stakes at Sandown that same month. Kingman provided Doyle with his first Irish classic, winning the Irish 2,000 Guineas for Gosden in May 2014 after a narrow defeat when starting favourite in the British 2,000 Guineas. That season, Kingman and Doyle went on to win a further three Group 1 races, including the St James's Palace Stakes at Royal Ascot. Doyle also had three Group 1 successes on Noble Mission, trained by Lady Cecil.

=== Godolphin 2015–2023 ===
In November 2014, it was announced that Doyle and William Buick would become joint-first stable jockeys for Sheikh Mohammed's Godolphin racing operation. Doyle originally rode the horses trained in Newmarket by Saeed bin Suroor, while William Buick rode those trained by Charlie Appleby. In 2016 he lost his position as first jockey for bin Suroor and was absorbed into Appleby's team as Buick's number two. In the nine seasons he was retained by Godolphin, Doyle rode 15 Group 1 winners in their blue silks, and 16 Group 1 winners for other owners and trainers.

In July 2018, Doyle achieved a second Irish classic success when Sea of Class, trained by William Haggas, won the Irish Oaks. That same month, Doyle passed the 1,000th British winner mark. In October, he rode Sea of Class into second place in the Prix de l'Arc de Triomphe, beaten a neck by Enable. The year was his best to date (as of 2025) in terms of British wins and prize money, winning 156 of his 633 British races and £4,745,322 in prize money.

At Royal Ascot in 2019, Doyle rode Blue Point, trained by Appleby, in a rare double, winning the King's Stand Stakes and Diamond Jubilee Stakes. It was only the third time a horse had achieved the sprint double. Doyle won his first British Classic on 30 April 2022, riding Coroebus, trained by Appleby, in the 2,000 Guineas. Coroebus was the Godolphin second string, but beat his stablemate and favourite Native Trail, ridden by Buick, by three-quarters of a length. The next day Doyle completed the Guineas double, winning the 1,000 Guineas on the George Boughey-trained Cachet. He received a two-day ban for his use of the whip in the race.

=== Wathnan Racing 2024–present ===
In October 2023, it was announced he would quit Godolphin after nine years to ride for the Emir of Qatar's Wathnan Racing operation. Doyle had ridden the Emir's Ballymount Boy to win the listed Prospect Stakes at Doncaster a few days prior. He took up his position with Wathnan Racing at the start of 2024. In his first season as retained jockey, he won four races for Wathnan at Royal Ascot, followed by a first Group 1 win for his retainers in the British Champions Sprint Stakes in October, riding Kind of Blue, a son of Blue Point. In April 2025, Doyle underwent surgery after breaking his collarbone in a fall at Chelmsford and was sidelined for over a month.

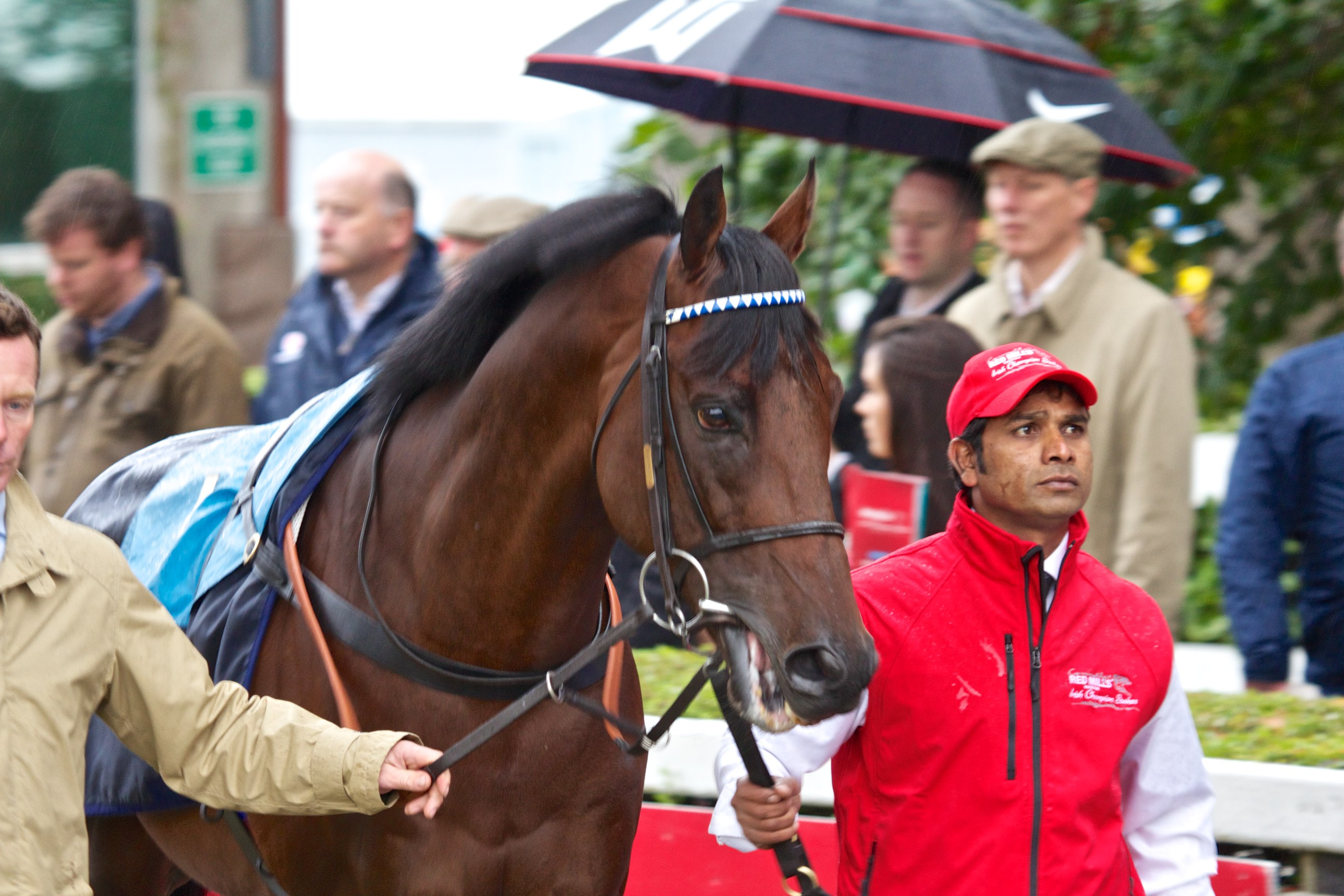
Al Kazeem, who James Doyle rode to win three Group 1 races

== Personal life ==
As of 2018, Doyle was living in Newmarket with his partner Samantha Kettle.

== Major wins ==
France

- Critérium de Saint-Cloud - (1) - Gear Up (2020)
- Grand Prix de Saint-Cloud – (1) – Noble Mission (2014)
- Prix du Moulin – (1) – Ribchester (2017)
- Prix du Cadran – (1) – Trueshan (2021)
- Prix Jacques Le Marois – (1) – Kingman (2014)
- Prix Marcel Boussac – (1) – Wild Illusion (2017)
- Prix Vermeille - (1) - Warm Heart (2023)

(United Kingdom) Great Britain

- 1000 Guineas Stakes – (1) – Cachet (2022)
- 2000 Guineas Stakes – (1) – Coroebus (2022)
- Ascot Gold Cup – (1) – Big Orange (2017)
- British Champions Sprint Stakes - (1) Kind Of Blue (2024)
- Champion Stakes – (1) – Noble Mission (2014)
- Dewhurst Stakes - (1) - Gewan (2025)
- Platinum Jubilee Stakes / Diamond Jubilee Stakes – (2) – Blue Point (2019), Naval Crown (2022)
- Eclipse Stakes – (1) – Al Kazeem (2013)
- Falmouth Stakes – (1) – Amazing Maria (2015)
- Haydock Sprint Cup – (1) – Hello Youmzain (2019)
- King George VI and Queen Elizabeth Stakes – (1) – Poet's Word (2018)
- King's Stand Stakes – (1) – Blue Point (2019)
- Lockinge Stakes – (1) – Night of Thunder (2015)
- Middle Park Stakes - (1) - Vandeek (2023)
- Prince of Wales's Stakes – (3) – Al Kazeem (2013), Poet's Word (2018), Lord North (2020)
- Queen Elizabeth II Jubilee Stakes - (1) - Lazzat (2025)
- St James's Palace Stakes – (2) – Kingman (2014), Barney Roy (2017)
- Sun Chariot Stakes - (1) - Fallen Angel (2025)
- Sussex Stakes – (1) – Kingman (2014)
- Yorkshire Oaks – (2) – Sea of Class (2018), Warm Heart (2023)

(Republic of Ireland) Ireland

- Irish 2,000 Guineas – (1) – Kingman (2014)
- Irish Oaks – (1) – Sea of Class (2018)
- Matron Stakes - (1) - Fallen Angel (2025}
- Moyglare Stud Stakes – (1) – Rizeena (2013)
- Tattersalls Gold Cup – (3) – Al Kazeem (2013, 2015), Noble Mission (2014)

United Arab Emirates

- Dubai Duty Free Stakes – (1) – Cityscape (2012)
- Al Maktoum Challenge, Round 3 – (1) – African Story (2015)
- Al Quoz Sprint – (1) – Jungle Cat (2018)
- Jebel Hatta – (2) – Hunter's Light (2015), Blair House (2018)

Australia

- Sir Rupert Clarke Stakes – (1) – Jungle Cat (2018)

Canada

- Northern Dancer Turf Stakes – (1) – Old Persian (2019)

Germany

- Grosser Preis von Baden – (1) – Barney Roy (2020)
- Grosser Preis von Berlin - (1) - Rebel's Romance (2022)

United States

- Breeders' Cup Turf-(1)- Rebel's Romance (2022)

== Statistics ==
Flat wins in Great Britain by year

- 2004 – 0 wins / 16 rides
- 2005 – 8 / 150
- 2006 – 73 / 759
- 2007 – 41 / 624
- 2008 – 52 / 638
- 2009 – 28 / 379
- 2010 – 29 / 360
- 2011 – 76 / 639
- 2012 – 80 / 580
- 2013 – 82 / 601
- 2014 – 121 / 682
- 2015 – 121 / 608
- 2016 – 98 / 541
- 2017 – 110 / 501
- 2018 – 156 / 633
- 2019 – 105 / 561
- 2020 – 101 / 565
- 2021 – 118 / 642
- 2022 – 91 / 450
- 2023 – 92 / 483
- 2024 – 74 / 431

Flat wins in Ireland by year

- 2005 – 0 / 1
- 2008 – 0 / 1
- 2011 – 0 / 1
- 2013 – 2 / 3
- 2014 – 2 / 6
- 2015 – 3 / 24
- 2016 – 2 / 9
- 2017 – 0 / 4
- 2018 – 3 / 7
- 2019 – 0 / 3
- 2021 – 0 / 1
- 2024 – 0 / 8
