= Roger Charlton =

English racehorse trainer

Roger J. Charlton
- Born: 18 January 1950 (age 76)
- Occupation: Racehorse trainer

Roger J. Charlton (born 18 January 1950) is an English racehorse trainer and a former flat racing jockey. He trains horses in Beckhampton Stables, near Marlborough in Wiltshire, England. He made an immediate impact as a trainer in England and Europe, including victories in both The Derby and the Prix du Jockey Club in 1990. There has been continued success with the likes of Three Valleys, Tante Rose, Harmonic Way, Trade Fair, Tamarisk, Bated Breath, Avonbridge, Striking Ambition and then Al Kazeem had a series of major victories in 2013. After retiring him to stud, Time Test appeared on the scene in 2015.

Roger is currently assisted by his son Harry. Previous assistants include Lambourn-based trainers Ed Walker and Daniel Kubler.

== Major wins ==
(United Kingdom) Great Britain

- Derby - (1) - Quest for Fame (1990)
- Haydock Sprint Cup - (2) - Tamarisk (1998), Tante Rose (2004)
- Prince of Wales's Stakes - (1) - Al Kazeem (2013)
- Eclipse Stakes - (1) - Al Kazeem (2013)
- Fillies' Mile - (1) - Quadrilateral (2019)

France

- Prix de l'Abbaye de Longchamp - (2) - Patavellian (2003), Avonbridge (2005)
- Prix du Cadran - (1) - Quest For More (2016)
- Prix d'Ispahan - (1) - Sanglamore (1991)
- Prix du Jockey Club - (1) - Sanglamore (1990)

Germany

- Preis von Europa - (1) - Aspetar (2019)

(Republic of Ireland) Ireland

- Irish Champion Stakes - (1) - Decorated Knight (2017)
- Pretty Polly Stakes - (1) - Thistle Bird (2014)
- Tattersalls Gold Cup - (3) - Al Kazeem (2013, 2015), Decorated Knight (2017)

United Arab Emirates

- Jebel Hatta - (1) - Decorated Knight (2017)
- Dubai Turf - (1) - Cityscape (2012)
