= Horse racing in Great Britain =

Racehorse statue at Newmarket, the home of British horse racing

Horse racing is the second largest spectator sport in Great Britain, and one of the longest established, with a history dating back many centuries. According to a report by the British Horseracing Authority it generates £3.39 billion total direct and indirect expenditure in the British economy, of which £1.05 billion is from core racing industry expenditure, and the major horse racing events such as Royal Ascot and Cheltenham Festival are important dates in the British and international sporting and society calendar.

The sport has taken place in the country since Roman times and many of the sport's traditions and rules originated there. The Jockey Club, established in 1750, codified the Rules of Racing and one of its members, Admiral Rous laid the foundations of the handicapping system for horse racing, including the weight-for-age scale. Britain is also home to racecourses including Newmarket, Ascot and Cheltenham and races including The Derby at Epsom, The Grand National and Cheltenham Gold Cup. Great Britain has also produced some of the greatest jockeys, including Fred Archer, Sir Gordon Richards and Lester Piggott.

Britain has also historically been a hugely important centre for thoroughbred racehorse breeding. In fact all racehorses are called English Thoroughbred, the breed having been created in England. All modern thoroughbred racehorses can trace a line back to three foundation sires which were imported to Britain in the late 17th/early 18th centuries and the General Stud Book first published by James Weatherby still records details of every horse in the breed.

Gambling on horseraces has been one of the cornerstones of the British betting industry and the relationship between the two has historically been one of mutual dependence. The betting industry is an important funder of horse racing in Great Britain, through the betting levy administered by the Horserace Betting Levy Board and through media rights negotiated by racecourses and betting shops.

== Types of racing ==
There are two main forms of horse racing in Great Britain.

- Flat racing, which is run over distances between 5 furlongs and 2 miles 5 furlongs 159 yards on courses without obstacles
- National Hunt racing, races run over distances between 2 miles and 4 1/2 miles, where horses usually jump either hurdles or fences (races known as steeplechases). There is also a category of National Hunt races known as National Hunt flat races, which are run under National Hunt rules, but where no obstacles are jumped.

Collectively, the above racing is often referred to as racing "under rules", since there is another form of racing which is run on an altogether more informal and ad hoc basis, known as point-to-point racing. Point-to-point is a form of steeplechasing for amateur riders.

All the above forms of the sport are run under the auspices of the governing and regulatory body for horse racing in Great Britain, the British Horseracing Authority. with the exception of point-to-pointing which is administered by the Point-to-Point Authority with the BHA taking on regulatory functions. There is also a limited amount of harness racing which takes place under the auspices of the British Harness Racing Society and Arabian racing which takes place under the auspices of the Arabian Racing Organisation.

== History ==
=== Roman era to Middle Ages ===
Horses were used as beasts of burden in pre-Roman times, but it is thought that the first horse races to take place in Britain were organised by soldiers of the Roman Empire in Yorkshire around 200 AD, although whether the Romans actually introduced the sport is a matter of conjecture. It is believed that Romans at the encampment at Wetherby matched horses against Arabian horses brought to England by Emperor Septimius Severus. Traces of racecourses dating to the Roman occupation exist, but records are scarce.

The Venerable Bede reports that the English began to saddle their horses about the year 631.

The earliest written mention of "running-horses" is a record of Hugh, from the French House of Capet, gifting some as a present to King Athelstan of England in the 9th/10th century. During Athelstan's reign a ban was placed on the export of English horses, such was supposed to be their superiority to continental ones. Continental ones were still permitted for import, and many were brought to England by William the Conqueror. Roger de Montgomerie, 1st Earl of Shrewsbury introduced Spanish stallions to the country.

The first recorded race meetings were during the reign of Henry II at Smithfield, London, during the annual St Bartholomew's horse fair. The event is attested by William Fitzstephen writing at some time after 1174 and the poet Drayton.

During the Crusades, horse-breeding improved and horseback contests were popular, but in the form of tournaments, rather than races. King John established a stud at Eltham, Kent and the Middle English romance Sir Bevis of Hampton has couplets which refer to races taking place in the time of Richard I.

For the next three centuries there are numerous records of Kings of England keeping 'running horses'. Edward III bought horses at £13 6s 8d each, and was also gifted two by the King of Navarre. The royal stud continued to grow throughout the reign of Henry VII.

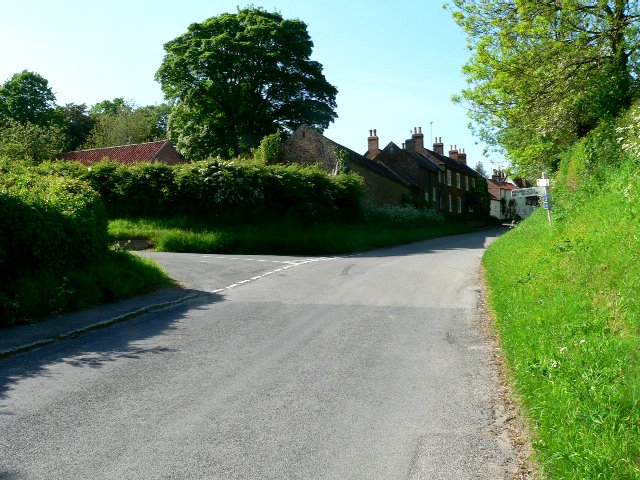
Kiplingcotes, Yorkshire, home of the world's oldest horse race

=== 16th Century ===
Records become more substantial during the time of Henry VIII. He passed a number of laws relating to the breeding of horses and also imported a large number of stallions and mares for breeding from Spain, Italy and the East. He kept a training establishment at Greenwich and the stud at Eltham. and founded the Royal Paddock at Hampton Court, where he kept mares and a "Barb worth his weight in silver", which has been given to him by the Marquis of Mantua.

Formal race meetings began to be instigated too. It is believed that the first occurrence of a trophy being presented to the winner of a race was in 1512 by organisers of a fair in Chester and was a small wooden ball decorated with flowers. Meanwhile, the oldest horse race still in existence, the Kiplingcotes Derby was first run in 1519. The Carlisle Bells, reputedly the oldest sporting trophy in the world, were first competed for in the 16th century, in a race that still bears their name. One of the bells is inscribed "The sweftes horse thes bel tak" ("The swiftest horse takes this bell").

Racing was firmly established at Chester, the oldest surviving racecourse in England, by 1540. By the time of Elizabeth, the sport was a "common amusement", and the Queen herself is recorded as attending races on Salisbury Plain in the 1580s, as well as keeping up the paddocks at Hampton and founding her own at Blackheath. Racing in the Forest of Galtres dates to 1590, Leith Races were established by 1591, and at Doncaster by 1595.

=== 17th century ===
During Elizabeth's reign, interest in horse racing appears to have waned, for reasons unrecorded, but this changed when in 1605, James I discovered the little village of Newmarket whilst out hawking or riding. He began to spend time there racing horses, and from then on it has been known as the home of horse racing in England. In fact, James built a palace and spent so much time there that the House of Commons petitioned him to concentrate more of his time on running the country. The region has had a long association with horses going back to the time of Boudica and the Iceni. The first recorded race there was a match for £100 between horses owned by Lord Salisbury and Marquess of Buckingham in 1622, and the racecourse was founded in 1636.

Chester continued to be a centre of the sport and by 1609 there are records of the St George's race being run five time round the "Roody" for a prize of silver bells and a sum of money. The first known Rules of Racing date from Kiplingcotes in 1619. Race meetings began to spring up elsewhere in the country. Races were run for silver bells at Gatherley, near Richmond in Yorkshire, Croydon and Theobalds on Enfield Chase. Jockey weights began to be measured and rigorously enforced, and formal training of horses took place, paying attention to food and exercise.

James VI and I encouraged the sport. Some of the Spanish horses that ended up in Galloway after the wrecking of the Spanish Armada were kept by local people and raced against the King's own horses when he was in Ireland. They proved better than the King's and were bought for the royal stables. The King supported several meetings, even acting as Clerk of the Course at Lincoln in 1607 and built a house at Newmarket as a hunting lodge and so he could enjoy the racing there. Private match races between gentlemen, riding their own horses, rather than using hired jockeys as became the norm later, became commons.

Around the time that Charles I of England came to the throne, Spring and Autumn race meetings were introduced to Newmarket and in 1634 the first Gold Cup event was held. Charles gave a 100 guinea silver cup to be raced for at Hyde Park, and instituted a silver plate at Newmarket. Meetings at Stamford and Epsom were now well established.

All horse racing was then banned in 1654 by Oliver Cromwell, and many horses were requisitioned by the state. Despite this Cromwell himself kept a stud running of his own. With the restoration of Charles II racing flourished and he instituted the Newmarket Town Plate in 1664, writing the rules himself:

Articles ordered by His Majestie to be observed by all persons that put in horses to ride for the Plate, the new round heat at Newmarket set out on the first day of October, 1664, in the 16th year of our Sovereign Lord King Charles II, which Plate is to be rid for yearly, the second Thursday in October for ever

— King Charles II, Rules of the Newmarket Town Plate

William III founded a riding academy and gave plates to be ridden for in many parts of the country. Between 1695 and 1702, he ran his own horses at Newmarket, including in a 2000 guinea match against the Duke of Somerset. The influential Tregonwell Frampton, known as the "Father of the Turf" was keeper of William's horses, and performed the same task for Queen Anne, George I and possibly Charles II and James II. He did much to improve the breed.

The three foundation sires of the modern thoroughbred, the Byerley Turk, Darley Arabian and Godolphin Barb were imported to England in the late 17th and early 18th centuries and founded the lines which can be traced down to every modern thoroughbred racehorse. At this point, they weren't the only influential sires. Others, including the grey Barb donated by the King to a Mr Hutton, and known as Hutton's Grey Barb contributed importantly to the breed.

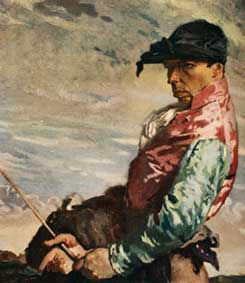
Jockey, Edwardian painting by the famous Irish artist William Orpen

The improvement of the breed was not purely for sporting purposes though. Warfare and conquest were also factors. As Whyte noted, "to the excellence of the British horse... may be ascribed much of our superiority over other nations, both in commerce and in war."

=== 18th century ===
In the early 18th century, Queen Anne kept a large string of horses and was instrumental in the founding of Royal Ascot where the opening race each year is still called the Queen Anne Stakes. The first published account of race results was John Cheney's Historical list of all the Horse Matches run, and all plates and prizes run for in England and Wales which dates to 1727. The Weatherby family succeeded Cheney as the keepers of the most complete set of racing records, and in a later work which came into their possession, published in York in 1748, the result is recorded of a race run in September 1709 on Clifton and Rawcliffe Ings, near York, for a gold cup of £50.

In 1740, Parliament introduced an act "to restrain and to prevent the excessive increase in horse racing"; this was largely ignored and in the 1750 the Jockey Club was formed to create and apply the Rules of Racing. However, until the 1760s, individual horses seldom ran more than five or six times, due to the scarcity of prizes on offer, but this began to change with major race meetings expanding the prizes on offer. Newmarket and York led the way in this.

Races were still generally for mature horses, and were typically run in matches, or in best-of-three heats over long distances. Three-year-old races were first run in 1731 and two-year-olds raced for the first time at Newmarket in 1769. In 1791, Cash became the first yearling to race, and beat a three-year-old in a match at Newmarket, in receipt of 3 stones.

Newmarket itself continued to grow as a centre of racing and many of the racecourse's historic meetings (with persist to this day) were established in the 1760s and 1770s.

By the end of the century the 12th Earl of Derby and Sir Charles Bunbury were key influencers in the sport. Under their auspices the Derby and Oaks were established at Epsom, inspired by the St Leger and the growing popularity of shorter races, for younger horses. These races, along with the Leger and the Guineas at Newmarket (which were established early in the 19th century) became known as the Classics.

At around the same time, jockeys began to earn a reputation in their own right, with early pioneers including Frank Buckle, Sam Chifney Sr and Jem Robinson.

=== 19th century ===
Interest in the sport was at a high throughout the 18th and 19th centuries. As Whyte's History of the English Turf noted in 1840, "For nearly a century and a half, the "Turf" has formed a favourite amusement of "Kings, Lords and Commons". Or as Rice's History reported in 1879, "for some two hundred years the pursuit of Horse-racing has been attractive to more of our countrymen than any other out-door pastime" Other traditional rural sports, including hawking, shooting and hare-hunting, had much diminished by this period, due to enclosure and "gradual refinement of manners" and racing was at its "acme".

Handicap races, in which horses are assigned weights to carry in proportion to their ability, became popular from the turn of the 19th century onwards. The first had been run at Ascot in 1791 and others followed. Many have persisted to this day including the Chester Cup (from 1824), Northumberland Plate (1833), Cesarewitch and Cambridgeshire Handicaps at Newmarket (both 1839), Goodwood's Stewards' Cup (1839), the Ebor at York (1843), the City and Suburban Handicap at Epsom (1851) and the traditional opener for the flat racing season, the Lincoln (1853).

Steeplechasing first became organised by Tom Colman at St Albans in the early 1830s. By the end of that decade, the Grand National had been established at Aintree by William Lynn.

In 1875, Sandown Park became the first racecourse to open a separate members' enclosure.

By the turn of the 20th century, it was said that "time has only strengthened and confirmed the national passion for the sport." Concerns over its moral effects were prevalent though. An interest in horse racing and the attendant gambling was described as the "offspring of a passion we should wish to disown", with a warning that "the modern turf is fast becoming the very manor of the worst".

=== 20th century to date ===
In 1947 Hamilton hosted the first evening race meeting in Great Britain. Now Wolverhampton Racecourse holds the most evening meetings, with nearly 50 a year.

The Jockey Club governed the sport until its governance role was handed to the British Horseracing Board, (formed in June 1993) and while the BHB became responsible for strategic planning, finance, politics, race planning, training and marketing, the Jockey Club continued to regulate the sport. In 2006 it formed the Horseracing Regulatory Authority to carry out the regulatory process whilst it focused on owning 13 racecourses and the gallops in Newmarket and Lambourn. In July 2007 the HRA merged with the BHB to form the British Horseracing Authority.

== Racecourses ==
There are 60 licensed racecourses in Great Britain, with a further two in Northern Ireland (Down Royal and Downpatrick). Apart from Chelmsford City and Ffos Las (which opened in 2009), all the courses date back to 1927 or earlier. The oldest is Chester Racecourse, which dates to the early 16th century.

Unlike some other countries, which include the United States, racing in Britain usually takes place on turf. However, there are six courses which have all-weather tracks – Kempton Park, Lingfield, Southwell, Wolverhampton, Chelmsford City and Newcastle. Southwell's surface is Fibresand. Wolverhampton installed a Tapeta surface in August 2014, replacing the existing Polytrack; Newcastle converted its Gosforth Park flat racing turf track to a Tapeta course with the addition of a floodlit all-weather straight mile in May 2016. All flat racing at Newcastle now takes place on the Tapeta surface with a turf course retained solely for a winter programme of jumps racing. The other three British all-weather tracks are all Polytrack. Ireland has a single all-weather Polytrack course at Dundalk. Courses also vary wildly in layout. There are very few which are regular ovals, as is the typical layout of other countries like the United States. Each course has its own idiosyncrasies, and horses are known to be more suited to some tracks than others, hence the idiom "horses for courses."

There are two main operating groups of British racecourses – Jockey Club Racecourses, which runs fifteen courses, and Arena Racing Company, which runs sixteen courses.

== Important races and meetings ==
=== Flat ===
Britain is home to some of the world's most important flat races and race meetings. While ancient horse races like the Kiplingcotes Derby and Newmarket Town Plate are now mainly curiosities, there are many older races which retain modern relevance. The five British Classics – the 1,000 Guineas, 2,000 Guineas, The Oaks, The Derby and the St. Leger – were founded in the late 18th and early 19th centuries and still represent the pinnacle of achievement for each generation of horses. The structure and distances of these races, if not the exact names, have been adopted by many other European horse racing authorities, such as Ireland. Royal Ascot is the major flat racing festival in Europe and attracts horses from all over the world. The modern flat season in Britain now also climaxes with British Champions Day, a festival of championship races, also held at Ascot.

=== National Hunt ===
In National Hunt racing, the Cheltenham Festival is the foremost jump racing festival in the world, and is an annual target for both British and Irish trainers. The festival hosts races such as the Cheltenham Gold Cup and Champion Hurdle, which are seen as the peak of their disciplines and over the years have been won by horses whose appeal has transcended the sport, including Kauto Star and Desert Orchid. More widely known still is the Grand National at Aintree, which despite being a very long and difficult race that is historically contested by a lower grade of horses than races at Cheltenham, has produced some of the sports equine superstars, like Red Rum. It has an estimated global audience of 600 million viewers.

=== Major festivals ===
- March
  - Cheltenham – The Cheltenham Festival
  - Lingfield Park – Blue Square Winter Derby
- April
  - Aintree – Aintree Grand National
  - Ayr – Scottish Grand National
  - Newmarket – Craven Meeting
  - Sandown Park – Bet365 Gold Cup Celebration
- May
  - Newmarket – Guineas Meeting
  - Chester – Chester's May Festival
  - York – Dante Meeting
- June
  - Epsom Downs – Epsom Derby Meeting
  - Ascot – Royal Ascot
  - Newcastle – Northumberland Plate
- July
  - Sandown Park – Coral-Eclipse Meeting
  - Newmarket – Newmarket's July Meeting
  - Ascot – King George Day
  - Goodwood – Glorious Goodwood
- August
  - York – Ebor Festival
- September
  - Haydock Park – William Hill Sprint Cup
  - Doncaster – St. Leger Meeting
  - Ayr – Western Meeting
  - Ascot – Ascot's September Festival
- October
  - Newmarket – Totesport Cambridgeshire Meeting
  - Newmarket – Newmarket's October Meeting
  - Ascot – Champions Day
  - Doncaster – Racing Post Trophy
- November
  - Cheltenham – The Paddy Power Open
  - Haydock & Aintree – North West Masters
  - Newbury – Hennessy Meeting
- December
  - Sandown Park – Tingle Creek Meeting
  - Kempton Park – Stan James Christmas Festival
  - Chepstow – Coral Welsh National

== Media coverage ==
=== Newspapers ===
British horse racing is served by a daily, national newspaper, the Racing Post, founded in 1986. This publication carries industry news, race cards for all British and Irish race meetings, tipping columns and betting information, as well as smaller sections on greyhound racing and general sport. There are also dedicated weekly publications including Racing Plus and monthly magazines such as Thoroughbred Owner & Breeder. In addition, there is a limited amount of racing coverage in broader equestrian magazines, such as Horse & Hound. Many national dailies also carry racing news and information in their sports pages.

At various times in history, there has been more than one racing daily, and fierce rivalries have existed between them. For most of the 20th century, the Sporting Life and Sporting Chronicle were the two competing papers, before the Manchester-based Chronicle closed in 1983 due to debts and falling circulation. The Racing Post was founded in 1986 to fill the gap and challenge the Sporting Life monopoly that resulted and these two were rivals throughout the 80s and 90s. Ultimately, only the Post survived as the owners of the Sporting Life, Trinity Mirror, closed the Life and took over the Racing Post trademark.

In the Victorian era, there was a wide range of sporting newspapers that carried racing news to a greater or lesser extent. These include Bell's Life in London (forerunner to the Sporting Life), The Sporting Times and The Sportsman (not to be confused with the short-lived 2006 newspaper of the same name). In 1840, Bell's Life is reported to compete with the Sunday Times as the two weekly turf newspapers. There were also four monthly magazines at that time – the Old Sporting Magazine (founded 1792), the New Sporting Magazine (founded 1824), the Sporting Review (founded 1837) and the Sportsman (stated to have originated in 1829, so not the same as the Sportsman above which was founded in 1865). However, coverage of horse racing in newspapers is believed to date as far back as the Evening English Chronicle in 1779.

=== Television ===
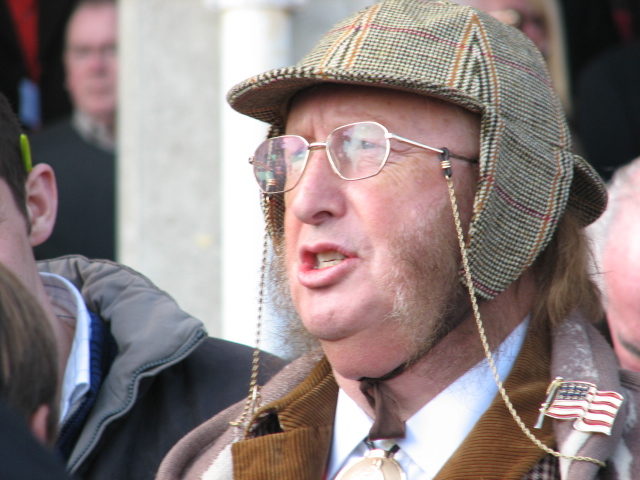
TV presenter, John McCririck

There are two dedicated horse racing channels on British digital television – Sky Sports Racing (free to air) and Racing TV (subscription only). Daily broadcasts of British race meetings are split between the two according to contracts arranged by racecourses and racecourse owning groups. Saturday racing and key midweek festival meetings are also broadcast on terrestrial television by ITV. The channel broadcasts a Saturday afternoon programme of live racing, usually between 13:30 and 16:00, and an hour-long weekly magazine show on Saturday mornings on ITV4. The coverage is presented by Ed Chamberlin and Oli Bell with AP McCoy, Alice Plunkett, Mick Fitzgerald and Francesca Cumani. 60 days of racing are shown on ITV4, and 40 days of racing are shown on ITV.

ITV had previously shown horse racing since its first weeks on air in 1955, and in the 1970s it provided an alternative to BBC coverage with the ITV Seven which featured as part of the channel's World of Sport programme. This lasted until the early 1980s, when coverage was gradually transferred to Channel 4. Prior to 2017, ITV had not shown any horse racing since 1988.

For many years, racing was also broadcast on the BBC, who pioneered coverage of the sport in the 1950s. The network retained the rights to key race meetings, such as the Grand National, Royal Ascot and the Derby until 2012 when it was outbid for the rights by Channel 4. The BBC broadcast some of the key moments in the history of British horse racing, such as Red Rum winning his third Grand National and the 1967 victory of Foinavon in the same race after most of the field fell at the same fence.

Channel 4's covered the sport for more than thirty years. Initially it showed the midweek events which were previously shown on ITV but from late 1985 it covered all of the racing previously shown by ITV. Between 2013 and 2016, Channel 4 was the exclusive home of horse racing on terrestrial television. The last day of Channel 4 Racing was on 27 December 2016.

As with other sports, many of the people who have presented racing on television through the years have become inseparably linked with racing in the public consciousness. Foremost among these for many years was the BBC's Peter O'Sullevan, known as "the voice of racing", who commentated on fifty Grand Nationals. Channel 4's most recognisable racing figure was John McCririck, famed for his eccentric dress sense and use of the bookmakers' sign language "tic-tac". Other notable presenters of Channel 4's coverage included Derek Thompson, John Francome, John Oaksey and Brough Scott. Clare Balding transferred from the BBC in 2013 to become lead presenter.

== Betting ==
Wagering money on horse races is as old as the sport itself, but in the United Kingdom, the links between horse racing and nationwide wagering are very strong. Betting shops are common sights in most towns, tending to be sited wherever a significant number of people with disposable cash can be expected.

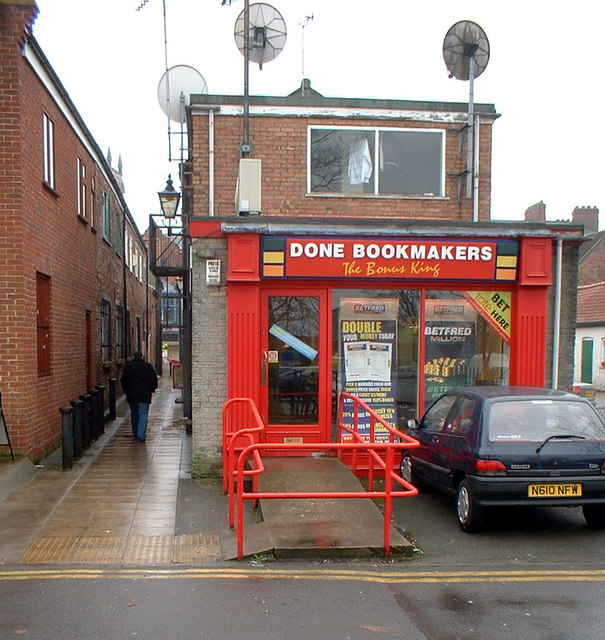
Betting shop in Brigg, Lincolnshire

As early as 1938, £500,000,000 was being gambled on horse racing in England according to the Christian Social Council Committee on Gambling. However, betting shops were not legalised until 1960, at which time many of the famous British betting shop chains such as William Hill, Ladbrokes and Corals were legally established on the high street. Previously, betting was either on course, via certain credit betting offices, or illegally conducted, often in or around public houses, with "bookies runners" ferrying the bets from bookmaker to client.

Clement Freud, a future Member of Parliament and racehorse owner, argued in a 27 October 1975 Commons debate that government policy was “milking” British racing for revenue, treating it primarily as a source of tax income rather than nurturing the sport.

Betting in the United Kingdom is taxed under the authority of various Acts of Parliament. A gross profit tax is levied on all UK-based bookmakers, payable to the Exchequer. At the same time, an additional sum is collected by the Horserace Betting Levy Board (HBLB), a non-departmental public body sponsored by the Department for Culture, Media and Sport (DCMS). The HBLB uses these funds to support race prize money, integrity services, and the improvement of horse racing in Britain.

On 6 October 2001, the UK Government abolished the turnover-based betting duty, which had previously been charged at 9% on either the stake or the winnings, at the bettor's discretion. The reform replaced the system with a gross profits tax on bookmakers, shifting the point of taxation from the customer to the operator.

Since 2015, the United Kingdom has experienced significant growth in online gambling, driven by widespread internet access and the expansion of mobile technology. Increasingly, punters place wagers through digital platforms that provide access to real-time data, live odds, and betting exchanges. Online communities, discussion forums, and tipping websites also allow punters to share information and strategies. The popularity of major racing events such as the Cheltenham Festival continues to draw large online participation, with hundreds of thousands of users engaging in digital betting and discussion each year.

For the 2022–23 fiscal year, the levy generated approximately £99 million in income for the Board, reflecting a continued recovery in betting turnover following the disruption of the COVID-19 pandemic..

== Key people ==
=== Jockeys ===
In the early days of British horse racing, owners tended to ride their own horses in races. This practice died out as racing became more organised and the owners, most of them aristocrats, had grooms ride the horses instead. Jockeys at this time were often scruffy and unkempt and not well-regarded. The 19th century racing chronicler, Nimrod, referred to the "costume" of the jockeys of the previous century as "deformity personified". Nevertheless, several Yorkshire-based jockeys became acclaimed in the mid-to-late 18th century. These included John Mangle, Bill Pierse, John Shepherd, three different individuals named John Singleton, Ben Smith and Bill Clift. Between them they won many of the early runnings of the oldest classic, the St. Leger. Their counterparts in the south became similarly celebrated, and exercised a similar dominance over the Newmarket classics. Amongst their number were Sam Chifney, Jem Robinson, the Arnull family – John, Sam and Bill – and "the first man to bring respectability to the profession" – Frank Buckle.

The 19th century was dominated by three jockeys – Nat Flatman, George Fordham and Fred Archer – who among them won forty flat jockeys' championships. With the expansion of print media and the growth of interest in horse racing among ordinary people, these jockeys became nationally recognised figures, with a profile enjoyed by the footballers and TV celebrities of today. When Archer died at his own hand, it is said:

In London, special editions of the evening papers were issued; crowds thronged Fleet Street to buy them and omnibuses stopped to allow passengers to read the billboards ... In tram or train, Archer's death was the sole topic of conversation. No greater interest could have been aroused had he been Prime Minister or a member of the Royal family.

— Tanner & Cranham, pp 78–79

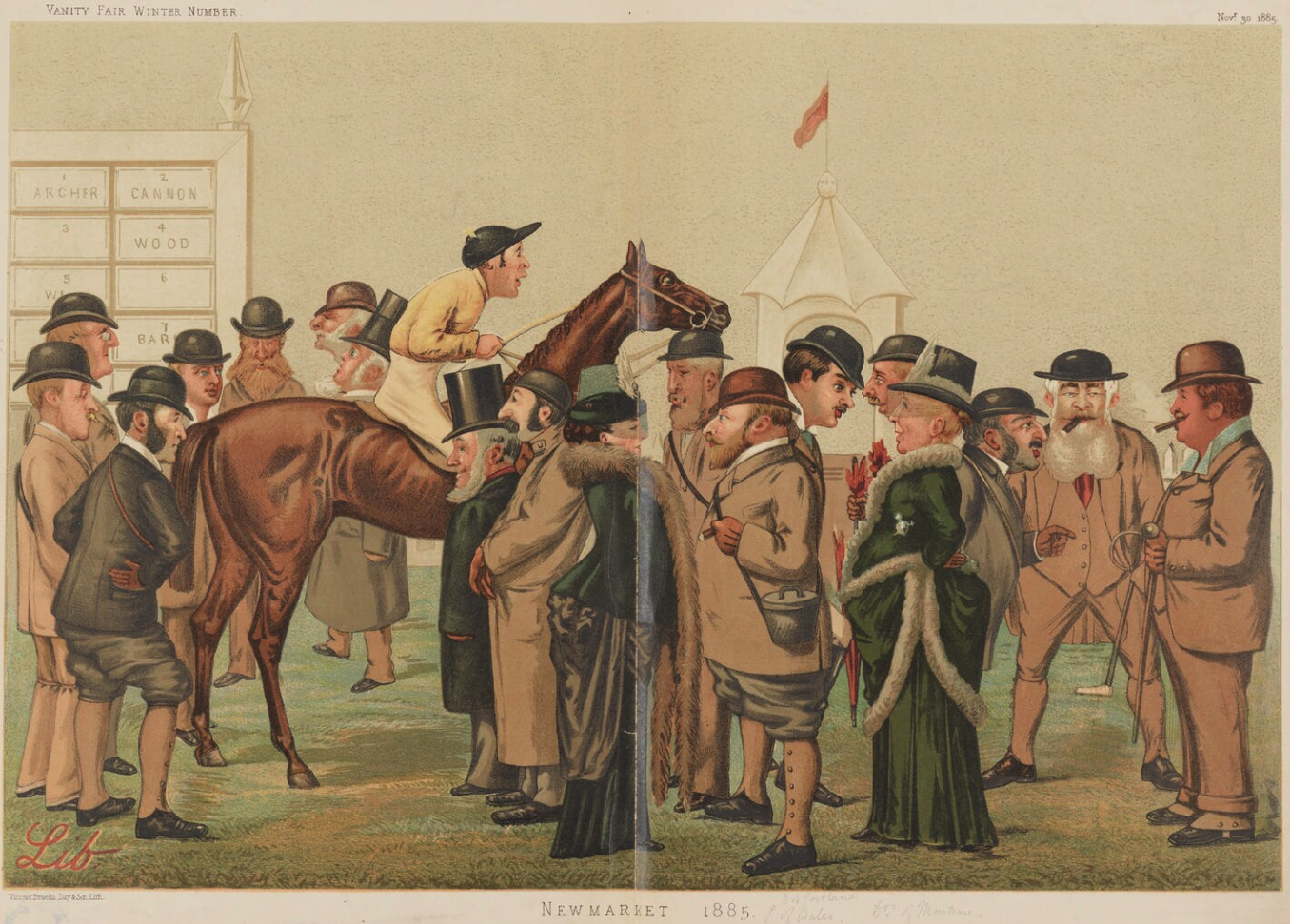
"Newmarket 1885", caricature by Liborio Prosperi published in Vanity Fair 1885. Persons portrayed include the Prince of Wales (future King Edward VII) and the jockey Fred Archer, with assorted dukes, duchesses, earls and other prominent figures in racing

The high profile of jockeys at this time is illustrated (literally) by the number of caricatures of jockeys that feature in Victorian society magazine, Vanity Fair, alongside Members of Parliament (MPs), aristocrats and other national figures.

Three figures dominate the flat racing scene of the 20th century too – Steve Donoghue, Gordon Richards and Lester Piggott. Richards is often regarded as the greatest jockey ever and set many records which still stand, including most flat race victories and most flat jockey championships. Piggott is descended from the great racing families of the 19th century, the Days and the Cannons.

In the modern day, Frankie Dettori is the jockey with the widest public profile beyond racing, appearing on Celebrity Big Brother and launching his own food range. He has also gained public attention for his feats on the racetrack, including his 'Magnificent Seven' wins at Ascot in 1997 and three jockeys' championships. Kieren Fallon was a regular champion around the turn of the century, and younger jockeys to have won multiple championships include Ryan Moore and current champion Oisin Murphy. Hayley Turner came to prominence as the first British woman to win a Group 1 race outright and as Champion Apprentice in 2005, and more recently Hollie Doyle has broken several of Turner's records and been nominated for BBC Sports Personality of the Year. Historically, jumps jockeys have not had the same profile as their flat counterparts, but this changed to some extent in the 20th century. The large television audience enjoyed by the Grand National has helped in this regard. Previously unknown jockeys like 2013 winner Ryan Mania have received their first nationwide coverage as a result of the race.

The most-celebrated jumps jockey of all-time is the Northern Irishman Tony McCoy, winner of every Jumps Jockeys' Championship from 1995/96 until 2014/15 and the only horse racing figure to ever win the BBC Sports Personality of the Year. He broke Gordon Richards' record for most winners in a season in 2001/02 and his total number of career wins by the time he retired was 4,358, well eclipsing the numbers set by Peter Scudamore and Richard Dunwoody who between them were the leading jumps jockeys of the 1980s and early 1990s. Richard Johnson, who has been second to McCoy in nearly all of his championships has the second most wins jockey of all time, and gained tabloid fame in the late 1990s for his relationship with Zara Phillips.

Former champion jump jockeys Dick Francis and John Francome have become known to a wider public after enjoying second careers as writers of racing-based fiction, while Francome (until the end of 2012) and Mick Fitzgerald are known as horse racing TV pundits.

As of November 2017, there are around 450 professional jockeys licensed in the United Kingdom, along with around 300 amateur riders.

=== Trainers ===
Formal training of racehorses began to be common in the reign of James I.

The two dominant forces in modern-day flat training in Britain in the modern era are Irish-based trainer Aidan O'Brien and Godolphin, through their trainers Saeed Bin Suroor and Charlie Appleby. They largely concentrate on Group races. Operating in much larger numbers of runners, but with a greater spread of quality, are trainers such as Mark Johnston, Richard Hannon Jr. and Richard Fahey.

In the jumps sphere, Nicky Henderson and Paul Nicholls dominate, along with the likes of David Pipe, Philip Hobbs, Jonjo O'Neill and Dan Skelton. In recent years, the Irish trainer Willie Mullins has enjoyed huge success in Britain, coming close to taking the Trainers Championship in 2015/16.

=== Owners ===
Aristocratic families have always owned horses in Britain, and the list of Classic winners features names such as the Duke of Grafton, Earl Grosvenor and Earl of Egremont from early days. In the modern era, Queen Elizabeth II retained a stable of horses trained by the likes of Michael Stoute. The Queen Mother was famously keen on horse racing, and a race at the Cheltenham Festival, the Queen Mother Champion Chase, is named in her honour. The current King and Queen continue to own horses, although a number of them were sold after the death of his mother, Queen Elizabeth II.

The two most prominent flat owners of the current era are Sheikh Mohammed, under the Godolphin banner and the team of Michael Tabor, John Magnier and others, based in Ireland.

Prominent jumps owners include JP McManus, Graham Wylie and Trevor Hemmings

=== Administrators ===
Modern-day racing originated in Britain, so many figures from British racing have shaped the sport. Admiral Rous established the handicapping process for horse racing, including the weight-for-age scale, while in the 20th century, form expert and sometime administrator of the sport, Phil Bull established Timeform whose ratings are often used to assess the all-time great horses.

== Key data ==
Key data for 2004, 2005 and 2010 extracted from the British Horseracing Board's annual reports for 2004 and 2005, the 2010 annual reportfrom its successor organisation, the British Horseracing Authority and the 2011/12 British Horseracing Fact Book

	2004	2005	2010	2011
Fixtures	1,299	1,300	1,392	1,469
Races	8,757	8,588	9,566	10,147
Runners	92,761	94,659	92,025	94,376
Prize money (Total)	£101.3 million	99.3 million	99.1 million	93.9 million
Prize money (Flat)	£65.4 million	63.9 million	67.6 million	62.4 million
Prize money (Jump)	£35.9 million	35.4 million	31.5 million	31.5 million
Racegoers (Total)	6,048,517	5,896,922	5,769,382	6,151,282
Racegoers (Flat)	3,873,508	3,704,567	3,854,863	3,917,510
Racegoers (Jump)	2,175,009	2,192,435	1,914,518	2,233,772
Monthly average horses in training	13,914	14,388	14,340	14,056
Monthly average owners with horses in training	9,266	9,403	8,774	8,425

The Chief Executive of the BHB stated in the 2005 annual report that "Success was achieved in an environment of great uncertainty." The sport is adapting to the loss of income from pre-race data following court ruling prohibiting the practice of charging for such in 2004 and 2005, to which the BHB attributes the fall in prize money in 2005. The data charges were themselves designed to replace income lost when a statutory levy was abolished. In 2004 attendances exceeded 6 million for the first time since the 1950s (2004 annual report). The decrease in 2005 is attributable to the closure of Ascot Racecourse for redevelopment for the entire year.

== Racehorse welfare ==
A 2006 investigation by The Observer found that each year 6–10,000 horses are slaughtered for consumption abroad, a significant proportion of which are horses bred for racing. The industry produces approximately 5,000 foals, whilst 4–5,000 racehorses are retired each year, 90 being taken into care by the industries charity Retraining of Racehorses. Research conducted by the Equine Fertility Unit found that 66% of thoroughbred foals were never entered for a race, and more than 80% were no longer in training after four years. Foal production has increased threefold since 1966. Racehorses are capable of living for more than 30 years.

== Illegal road racing ==
'Pony and trap' racing on roads, associated with the UK Traveller community, has been raised as a road hazard by several councils in Great Britain. This has led to police action and restriction on the use of these carriages on roads in Buckinghamshire and Oxfordshire.

== See also ==
- Horse racing in Ireland
- Horse racing in Scotland
- Horse racing in Wales
- List of significant families in British horse racing
- British flat racing Champion Jockey
- British jump racing Champion Jockey

== Bibliography ==
- Barrett, Norman, ed. (1995). The Daily Telegraph Chronicle of Horse Racing. Enfield, Middlesex: Guinness Publishing.
- Cawthorne, George James; Herod, Richard S. (1902). Royal Ascot, Its History & Its Associations (PDF). London: A Treherne & Co. ISBN 9785519295192.
- Horse-Racing: Its History and Early Records of the Principal and other Race Meetings with Anecdotes etc. London: Saunders, Otley & Co. 1863.
- Nimrod (1901). The Turf. London: Gay and Bird.
- Plumptre, George (1985). The Fast Set – The World of Edwardian Racing. London: Andre Deutsch. ISBN 0233977546.
- Tanner, Michael; Cranham, Gerry (1992). Great Jockeys of the Flat. Enfield, Middlesex: Guinness Publishing. ISBN 0-85112-989-7.
- Whyte, James Christie (1840). History of the British turf from the earliest period to the present day, Volume I. London: H. Colburn. OL 6544990M.
