= South Dalton Almshouses =

Building in the East Riding of Yorkshire, England

Coordinates: 53.8968°N 0.5299°W

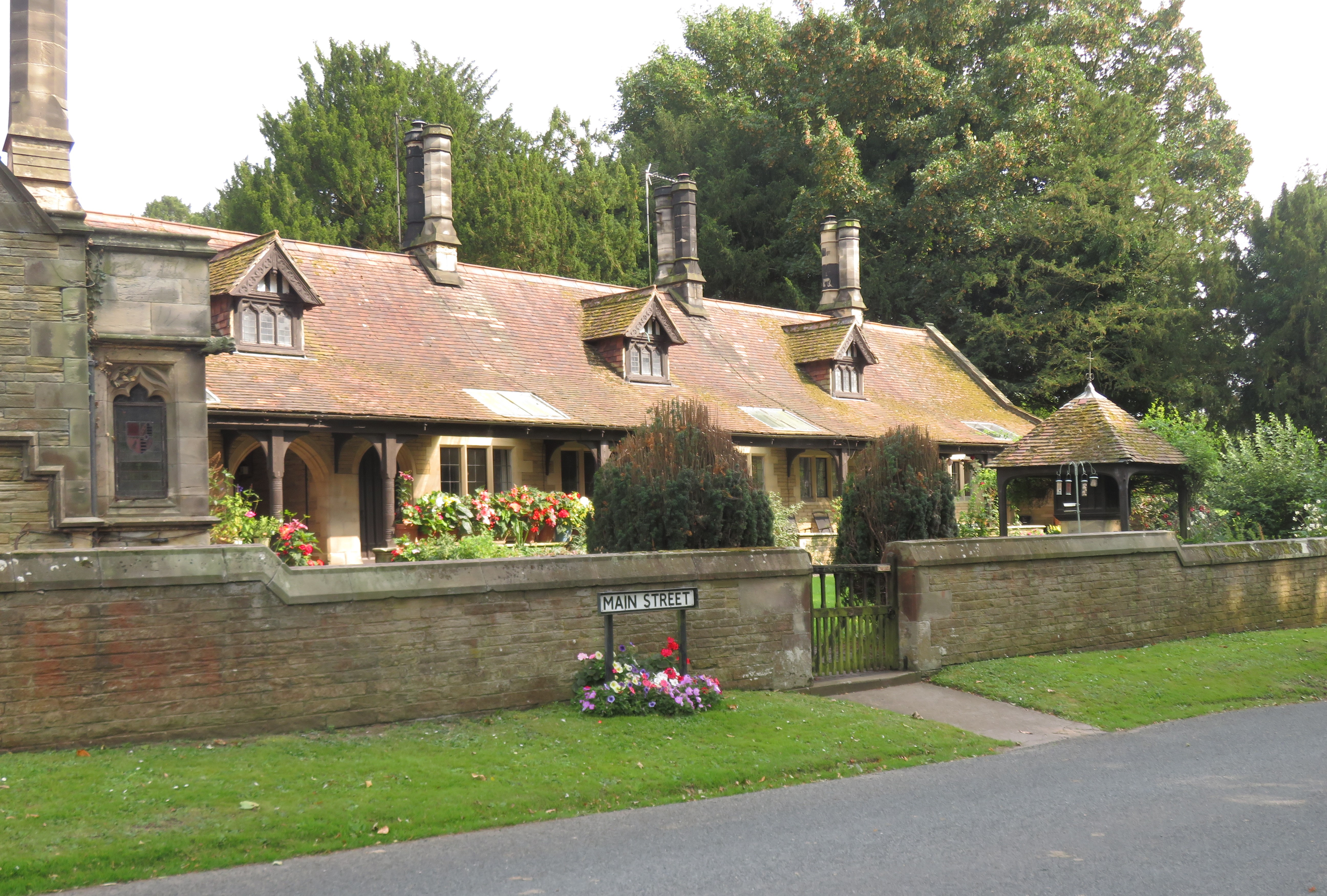
The building, in 2024

The South Dalton Almshouses is a historic building in South Dalton, a village in the East Riding of Yorkshire, in England.

The almshouses lie next to St Mary's Church, South Dalton. They were built between 1873 and 1874 by Payne. They were commissioned by John Hotham, 5th Baron Hotham, in memory of his brother, Charles Hotham, the 4th Baron. They are in the Tudor revival style, and are described by Nikolaus Pevsner as "picturesque". They were grade II listed in 1987.

The almshouses are in stone, and have a tile roof with coped gable. They have a single storey and attics, and are seven bays wide, with a projecting two-bay chapel on the left. The doorways have pointed heads and the windows are mullioned. Along the front is a timber verandah with wooden posts on a dwarf coped wall. On the roof are three gabled dormers with bargeboards, and paired octagonal chimneys. The chapel has a doorway in a pointed arch, a four-light mullioned square bay window, and a coped gable with an ornate finial.

== See also ==
- Listed buildings in Dalton Holme
