= Kiplingcotes Derby =

Annual British horse race

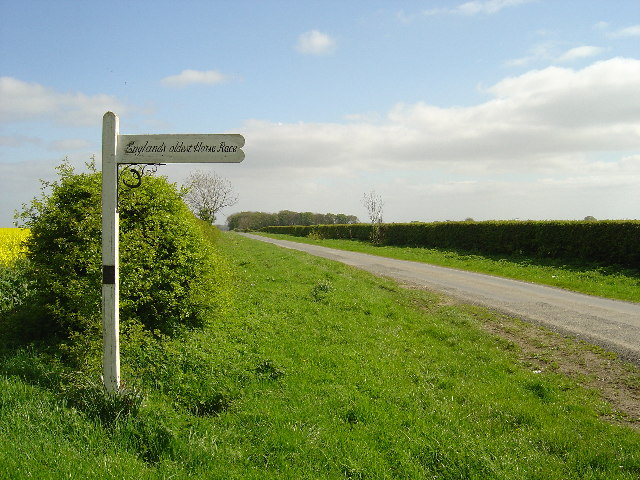
- Kiplingcotes Finishing Post
- Status: Active
- Genre: Steeplechase
- Frequency: Annually
- Locations: Kiplingcotes, East Riding of Yorkshire
- Coordinates: 53.919°N 0.640°W
- Country: England
- Inaugurated: 1519
- Most recent: 19 March 2026
- Previous event: 20 March 2025
- Next event: 18 March 2027

Kiplingcotes Derby (also spelt Kipling Cotes), run at Kiplingcotes in the East Riding of Yorkshire, is widely accepted to be the oldest annual horse race in the English sporting calendar. It reputedly began in 1519 and takes place on the third Thursday in March, often in exceptionally adverse weather conditions. The 500th race took place on 21 March 2019.

One quirk of the ancient rules means that the second place rider often receives more in prize money than the winner. It is run, not over a typical modern racecourse, but partly along the wide verge of a roadside. A clerk is paid 5 shillings (25p) annually for maintaining it.

== History ==
Kiplingcotes is a small hamlet close to Market Weighton, in the East Riding of Yorkshire. The race starts near the former Kiplingcotes railway station and runs for 4.5 miles (7.2 km), finishing at Londesborough Wold Farm.

The winning post sign is located within the parish boundary of Middleton on the Wolds. In the late 1800s, local resident Richard Witty was a well known racer and horse breeder on the derby.

The race was started by the Earl of Burlington in 1519, and the first prize is the accrued interest of an original investment of 16 guineas by the organisers, who stipulated the rules as laid down in 1618;

A horse race to be observed and ridd yearly on the third Thursday in March open to horses of all ages to carry horseman's weight, 10 stones, exclusive of saddle, to enter at ye post before eleven o'clock on the morning of ye race. The race to be run before two.

Women were finally allowed to compete from 1933 onwards, but the history of the Derby states that a 60-year-old woman jockey competed in 1926 riding side-saddle, being in the lead almost all the way until the last 40 yards (37 m).

In 1930 the racers had to deal with 3-foot (0.91 m) snowdrifts, and as The Times stated in case of no racers turning up, "..there is always some country youth keeping a watchful eye in case no entry is made by 11 o'clock. If such a thing happened, the youth would put in his entry on some old dobbin released from plough[ing] a field...." During the harsh winter of 1947, no one was daring enough to take part, and so one local farmer took it upon himself to lead a lone horse around the course, ensuring that the historic race would survive. The race normally takes 10 minutes to complete, but the farmer was contending with 4 feet (1.2 m) snowdrifts, and so had to often dismount and clear a path before taking his horse through. It took an hour and 20 minutes for him to complete the course. During the 2001 UK foot-and-mouth crisis the race was once again reduced to one horse and rider. In 2018 the race was cancelled after the course was waterlogged, and again a single horse was led round the course. The 2020 event was kept going by just two riders and their horses (Ferkin and Harry) because of the COVID-19 pandemic to preserve the race.

The race is deemed to be the oldest horse-race held in England, having started in 1519 and using the same course since 1664. The Grand National was inaugurated in 1836 (first official race in 1839) and the Epsom Derby was first run in 1780. The latest winner in 2025 was Sunny ridden by Sophie Faulkener-Smith, and the history of the race is covered in a book, 'The Kiplingcotes Derby & Newmarket town Plate' written by John Slusar.

== Races ==
Number	Year	Date	Ref
490th	2009	19 March	
491st	2010	18 March	
492nd	2011	17 March	
493rd	2012	15 March	
494th	2013	21 March	
495th	2014	20 March	
496th	2015	19 March	
497th	2016	17 March	
498th	2017	16 March	
499th	2018	15 March	(Note: Race was cancelled due to dangerous conditions (a waterlogged course with deep water-filled wheel ruts). A horse was walked round the course to preserve the race.)
500th	2019	21 March	
501st	2020	19 March	(Note: Race was cancelled due to COVID-19 pandemic. A horse was walked round the course to preserve the race.)
502nd	2021	18 March	
503rd	2022	17 March	
504th	2023	16 March	
505th	2024	21 March	
506th	2025	20 March	
507th	2026	19 March	

== Rules ==
- The course takes in 4 miles (6.4 km) of arduous farm track and field.
- Riders must weigh in at 10 stone (140 lb; 64 kg) (excluding saddle).
- Horses of any age can be ridden.
- All those wishing to enter must gather by the starting post by 11 a.m. on the morning of the Derby.
- The winner receives the sum of almost £100 (2023 total), but the rider finishing second receives the remainder of the total of the entry fees.
- The rules also state that if the race is not run one year, then it must never be run again.
