= Kiplingcotes =

Hamlet in the East Riding of Yorkshire, England

Coordinates: 53.897429°N 0.593796°W

- Location within the East Riding of Yorkshire
- OS grid reference: SE925455
  - London: 165 mi (266 km) S
- Civil parish: Dalton Holme; Etton
- Unitary authority: East Riding of Yorkshire
- Ceremonial county: East Riding of Yorkshire
- Region: Yorkshire and the Humber
- Country: England
- Sovereign state: United Kingdom
- Post town: BEVERLEY
- Postcode district: HU17
- Post town: YORK
- Postcode district: YO25
- Dialling code: 01430
- Police: Humberside
- Fire: Humberside
- Ambulance: Yorkshire
- UK Parliament: Beverley and Holderness

Kiplingcotes is a hamlet in the East Riding of Yorkshire, England. It is situated approximately 3.5 miles (6 km) north-east of the market town of Market Weighton, and 3 miles (5 km) to the west of Etton.

The hamlet is mentioned in the Domesday Book as Climbicote, having two ploughlands and belonging to the Archbishop of York. The name was most often written as two words (Kipling Cotes, or Kipling Coates), and means The cottages of Cybbel's people, Cybbel being an Old English personal name. It was originally part of the parish of Middleton on the Wolds, which was in the wapentake of Harthill. It is now split between the civil parishes of Dalton Holme and Etton, and is represented at Parliament as part of the Beverley and Holderness Constituency.

Kiplingcotes is the location for the annual Kiplingcotes Derby horse race. The 500th race took place on 21 March 2019.

The hamlet was served by Kiplingcotes railway station on the York to Beverley Line between 1865 and 1965.

In 1823 Kiplingcotes (then alternatively Kipling Coates House), a farmer was listed as the only inhabitant.

Kiplingcotes Chalk Pit Nature Reserve, to the west of the hamlet is managed by Yorkshire Wildlife Trust.

In 1993, the name Kiplingcotes was removed from Ordnance Survey mapping, and Humberside County Council refused to place new signs directing people to the hamlet.

== Gallery ==
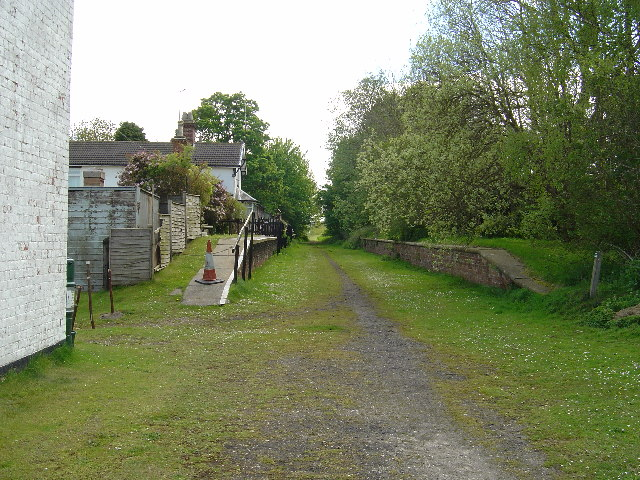
Kiplingcotes station, now disused

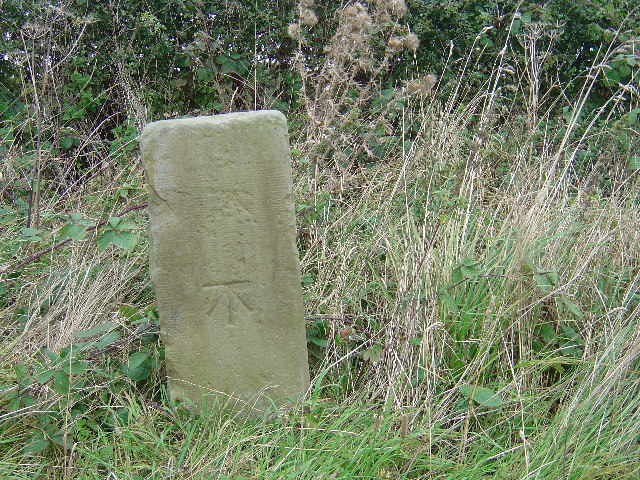
Benchmark used as the start post for the Kiplingcotes Derby

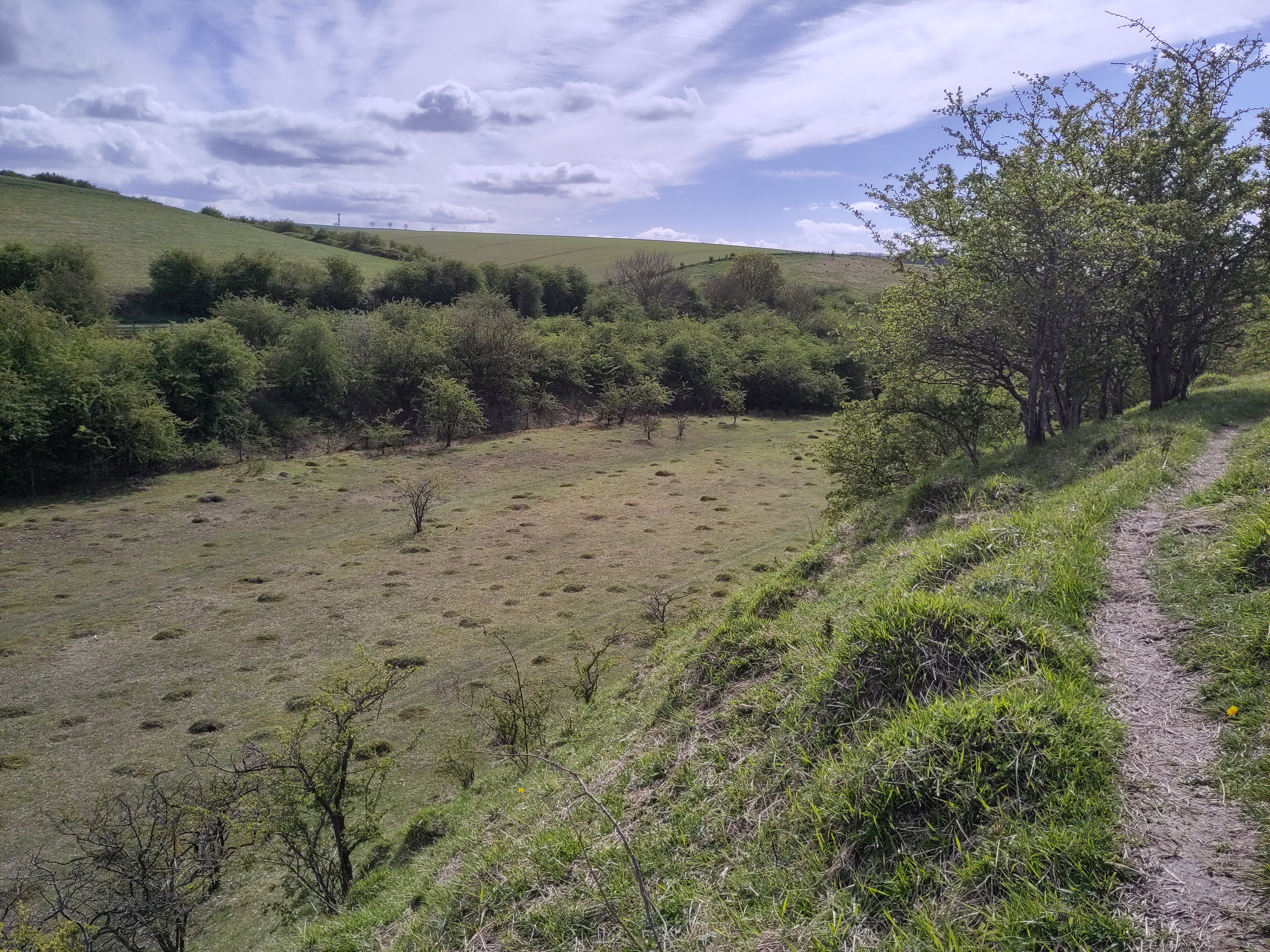
Kiplingcotes Quarry Nature Reserve in April
