= Stefano Cherchi =

Italian jockey (2001–2024)

Personal information
- Full name: Stefano Davide Cherchi
- Nationality: (Italy) Italian
- Born: 8 March 2001 Sardinia, Italy
- Died: 3 April 2024 (aged 23) Canberra, Australia
- Resting place: Sassari, Italy

Horse racing career
- Sport: Horse racing
- Career winnings: A$1,927,178
- Career wins: 108

Major racing wins
- Brighton Mile Challenge Trophy Handicap; Grey Horse Handicap

Stefano Cherchi (8 March 2001 – 3 April 2024) was an Italian jockey.

== Career ==
Cherchi made his debut in August 2018 riding Casina Di Notte at Nottingham. He was apprentice to Italian trainer Marco Botti in Newmarket. The following year, Cherchi rode his first winner at Wolverhampton, Withoutdestination. After riding 38 winners for Botti, Cherchi moved to Amy Murphy's yard where he rode a further 10 winners as her apprentice jockey.

Cherchi had notable winners including the Grey Horse Handicap at Newmarket onboard Mitrosonfire in 2021. He also rode Maximilian Caesar to victory in a 1m2f handicap during the 2023 St Leger meeting, beating the Ryan Moore-ridden Westerton in a photo-finish. Cherchi also won Brighton's feature race, the Brighton Mile. His first Group 1 mount was Redhot Whisper for Ben Brookhouse in the 2023 Futurity Trophy at Doncaster. He would finish last of seven runners.

Following British success, Cherchi moved to Australia in late 2023 where he joined Annabel Neasham's stables at Warwick Farm. He would ride 25 times in Australia, winning twice. His last winner came aboard Flying Bat at Gosford on 16th March 2024.

== Accident and death ==
On 20 March 2024, Cherchi was injured when his horse Hasime fell while racing at Canberra, Australia. Two other jockeys, Jeff Penza and Shaun Guymer were brought down by the fall, but were able to walk back to the weighing room. Cherchi was treated for injuries at the racecourse before being transferred to hospital. On 3 April he died in hospital from his injuries, at the age of 23.

Cherchi's funeral took place in Sassari, on the island of Sardinia. A memorial service at Our Lady Immaculate and Saint Etheldreda Church in Newmarket was attended by hundreds of members of the horse racing community. Several months later, a memorial race was run for Cherchi at[Hippodrome Pinna near his birthplace of Mores.

== Personal life ==
Cherchi's girlfriend was Brittany Fallon, daughter of Irish jockey Kieren Fallon. Cherchi was close friends with her brother, Cieren, and fellow Italian jockey Andrea Atzeni. Atzeni later dedicated his win in the Sydney Cup to Cherchi.
