= Listed buildings in Dalton Holme =

Dalton Holme is a civil parish in the county of the East Riding of Yorkshire, England. It contains 18 listed buildings that are recorded in the National Heritage List for England. Of these, two are listed at Grade I, the highest of the three grades, one is at Grade II*, the middle grade, and the others are at Grade II, the lowest grade. The parish contains the villages of South Dalton and Holme on the Wolds and the surrounding area. The listed buildings include a country house and associated structures, smaller houses, farmhouses and cottages, a church, a row of almshouses and a pump house, and two telephone kiosks.

== Key ==
Grade	Criteria
I	Buildings of exceptional interest, sometimes considered to be internationally important
II*	Particularly important buildings of more than special interest
II	Buildings of national importance and special interest

== Buildings ==
Name and location	Photograph	Date	Notes	Grade
Oak Cottage; 53.893826°N 0.52979°W		17th century	The house is timber framed, with brick infill on the ground floor, and a pantile roof with plain close verges on the left, and hipped to the right. There are two storeys and three bays. The doorway is on the right bay, on the centre bay is a casement window, and the other windows are horizontally sliding sashes.	II
26 West End; 53.89550°N 0.53380°W		1706	The cottage is in colourwashed brick with a pantile roof. There is a single storey and attics, and two bays. The doorway is on the left, and at the right end is an initialled datestone. The windows are horizontally siding sashes, and there is a long raking roof dormer.	II
16 East Street; 53.90475°N 0.52933°W		Early 18th century	The house is in red brick, with a cogged brick band, a dentilled brick eaves cornice, and a Roman tile roof with tumbled-in brick to raised gables on brick kneelers. There is one storey and attics, and four bays. On the front is a doorway and four sash windows, all under flat gauged brick arches. Above are four half-dormers with horizontally sliding sashes.	II
23 Main Street; 53.89416°N 0.52951°W		Early 18th century	The cottage is in colourwashed brick, and has a pantile roof with tumbled-in brick to the plain close verges. There is a single storey with attics, and three bays. Steps lead up to the doorway, and the windows are horizontally sliding sashes.	II
Summer Pavilion, Dalton Hall; 53.89123°N 0.55821°W	—	1733–34	The building in Dalton Wood to the west of the house is in rendered brick on a plinth, with stone dressings, and a slate roof. There is a single storey and a tripartite front, containing Tuscan columns with vermiculated bands and quoins. In the centre, steps lead up to a round-arched entrance with a Greek key impost band, and a vermiculated keystone, and the windows are sashes. There is an entablature, raked cornices, and a pediment over the doorway, and on the top are spherical urns with vermiculated equatorial bands.	I
8 and 10 Main Street; 53.89620°N 0.53019°W		Early to mid-18th century	A pair of cottages in colourwashed brick with a stepped brick eaves cornice, a pantile roof, a single storey and attics. Each cottage has two bays, a central doorway with a projecting gabled canopy, and sash windows under segmental heads. Above, there are three raked dormers.	II
Dalton Hall; 53.89307°N 0.54705°W		1771–75	A country house rebuilt by Thomas Atkinson, it is in grey brick with stone dressings and slate roofs. The main block has three storeys and five bays, with single-storey three -bay wings linked to three-bay pavilions, the south with two storeys and the north with one. The main block has a floor band, a dentilled cornice, and a balustraded parapet with a central achievement and piers with urn. In the centre is a hexastyle portico with an entablature and a blocking course, and a doorway with an architrave, and a fanlight with radial glazing. The windows are sashes, the window above the doorway in chambranles under a segmental pediment, the others on the lower two floors under floating cornices, and on the top floor the middle window in an architrave, and the others under flat brick arches.	II*
9 Main Street; 53.89612°N 0.52989°W		Late 18th century	The house is in red brick, with a dentilled brick eaves cornice, and a pantile roof with tumbled-in brick to the raised gables. There are two storeys and three bays. The central doorway has a rectangular fanlight, the windows are sashes, and all the openings have cambered gauged brick arches.	II
4 West End; 53.89582°N 0.53126°W	—	Late 18th century	The house is in brown brick, with a stepped brick eaves cornice, and a pantile roof with tumbled-in brick to the raised gables. There are two storeys and three bays, and a rear wing. The central doorway has a rectangular fanlight, and the windows are sashes. The ground floor openings are under segmental brick arches.	II
14 West End; 53.89558°N 0.53280°W	—	Late 18th century	The house is in red brick, and has a pantile roof with tumbled-in brick to the raised gables. There are two storeys and three bays. The doorway is in the centre, and the windows are horizontally sliding sashes, those on the ground floor with cambered gauged brick arches.	II
Stable block, Dalton Hall; 53.89430°N 0.54879°W		Late 18th century	The stable block is in red and grey brick with slate roofs, and forms a quadrangular plan. The main front has seven bays, a bracketed cornice and a balustraded parapet. The middle bay projects slightly and contains a round-arched opening with a rusticated surround. Above it is a low clock tower with rusticated quoins, a clock face, and oversailing eaves, on which is a louvred lantern containing round-arched openings with keystones, a cornice, and a pyramidal lead dome with a weathervane. The outer bays contain smaller round-arched openings with fanlights and rusticated surrounds, and above are oculi with rusticated surrounds and keystones.	II
Kiplingcotes Farmhouse; 53.89467°N 0.58031°W	—	Late 18th century	The farmhouse is in red brick, and has a slate roof with tumbled-in brick to the raised gables. There are two storeys, four bays and a rear wing. The doorway has pilasters and a fanlight, and the windows are sashes under cambered gauged brick arches.	II
Moneypot Hill Farmhouse; 53.90207°N 0.57968°W	—	Late 18th century	The house is in brown brick, with a dentilled eaves cornice, and a pantile roof with tumbled-in brick to the raised gables. There are two storeys and three bays. On the front is a porch and a doorway with a fanlight, and the windows are sashes under flat gauged brick arches.	II
St Mary's Church; 53.89718°N 0.52951°W		1858–61	The church was designed by J. L. Pearson, and the vestry was added in 1878. It is built in stone with a slate roof, and consists of a nave, a south porch, north and south transepts, a chancel with north and south chapels and a north vestry, and a west steeple. The steeple has a tower with three stages, a moulded plinth, a moulded band with blank quatrefoils, buttresses, a four-light pointed west window with a hood mould, and three-light bell openings above which is a balustrade of trefoil-headed openings. The bell openings are flanked by clasping buttresses rising to an octagonal spire. There is a carved corbel table with five ornate bands, a low parapet, and a tall octagonal spire with two tiers of lucarnes, short flanking pinnacles and a weathervane.	I
Almshouses; 53.89683°N 0.52991°W		1873	The almshouses are in stone, and have a tile roof with coped gable. There is a single storey and attics, and seven bays, with a projecting two-bay chapel on the left. The doorways have pointed heads and the windows are mullioned. Along the front is a timber verandah with wooden posts on a dwarf coped wall. On the roof are three gabled dormers with bargeboards, and paired octagonal chimneys. The chapel has a doorway in a pointed arch, a four-light mullioned square bay window, and a coped gable with an ornate finial.	II
Pump house 53.89670°N 0.53001°W		1873	The pump house in front of the almshouses has a square central pier containing the pump, with a panelled upper section containing blank Gothic tracery. It is surrounded by a canopy on four timber posts, with a pyramidal tile roof and a cross finial.	II
Telephone kiosk, Holme on the Wolds; 53.90467°N 0.52895°W		1935	The telephone kiosk in East Street is of the K6 type designed by Giles Gilbert Scott. Constructed in cast iron with a square plan and a dome, it has three unperforated crowns in the top panels.	II
Telephone kiosk, South Dalton; 53.89394°N 0.52977°W	—	1935	The telephone kiosk in Main Street is of the K6 type designed by Giles Gilbert Scott. Constructed in cast iron with a square plan and a dome, it has three unperforated crowns in the top panels.	II
