= South Dalton =

Village in the East Riding of Yorkshire, England

Coordinates: 53°53′43″N 0°31′48″W

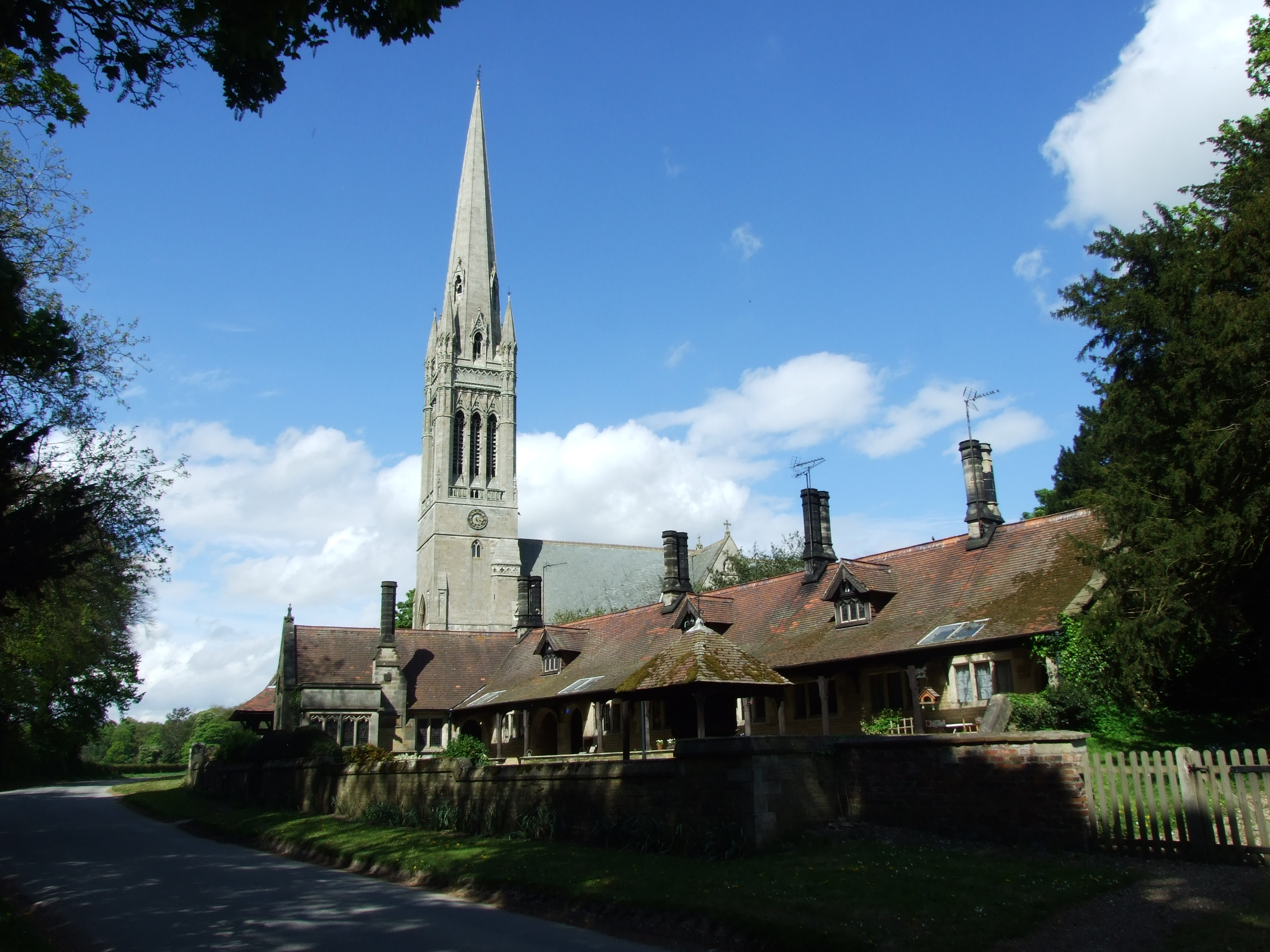
- St Mary's Church seen beyond the village alms houses

- Location within the East Riding of Yorkshire
- OS grid reference: SE966453
  - London: 165 mi (266 km) S
- Civil parish: Dalton Holme
- Unitary authority: East Riding of Yorkshire
- Ceremonial county: East Riding of Yorkshire
- Region: Yorkshire and the Humber
- Country: England
- Sovereign state: United Kingdom
- Post town: BEVERLEY
- Postcode district: HU17
- Dialling code: 01430
- Police: Humberside
- Fire: Humberside
- Ambulance: Yorkshire
- UK Parliament: Beverley and Holderness

South Dalton is a village and former civil parish, now in the parish of Dalton Holme, in the East Riding of Yorkshire, England. It is situated 6 miles (10 km) north-east of Market Weighton and 5 miles (8 km) north-west of Beverley. Etton lies 2 miles (3.2 km) to the south-east. North Dalton is 5 miles (8 km) north-west, with the villages of Middleton on the Wolds and Lund between. In 1931 the parish had a population of 233. On 1 April 1935 the parish was abolished and merged with Holme on the Wolds to form "Dalton Holme".

The village forms part the Dalton Estate, owned and managed by the Hotham family which has possessed land in the area for generations. The 18th-century Dalton Hall is the home of Lord Hotham. The Dalton Estate office is within the village. The Estate houses are of rows of cottages and Tudor style houses, some with date plates dating as far back as 1706.

According to A Dictionary of British Place Names the village name derives from the Old English for a "farmstead or village in a valley." South Dalton is listed in the Domesday Book as "Delton". At the time of the survey the settlement was in the Hundred of Sneculfcros in the East Riding of Yorkshire. It contained twelve households, twelve villagers, and six ploughlands. In 1066 Ealdred, the Archbishop of York, held the Lordship, this transferring by 1086 to the canons of Beverley, with Thomas of Bayeux, the later Archbishop of York, as Tenant-in-chief to King William I. By 1260 the settlement name was recorded as "Suthdalton".

In 1823 South Dalton was a village and civil parish in the Wapentake of Harthill. Population at the time was 277. Occupations included twelve farmers, a shopkeeper, a boot & shoe maker, a carpenter & wheelwright, a blacksmith, and the landlord of The Board public house. A weaver was also the parish clerk. Three carriers operated between the village and Beverley once a week.

== St Mary's Church ==
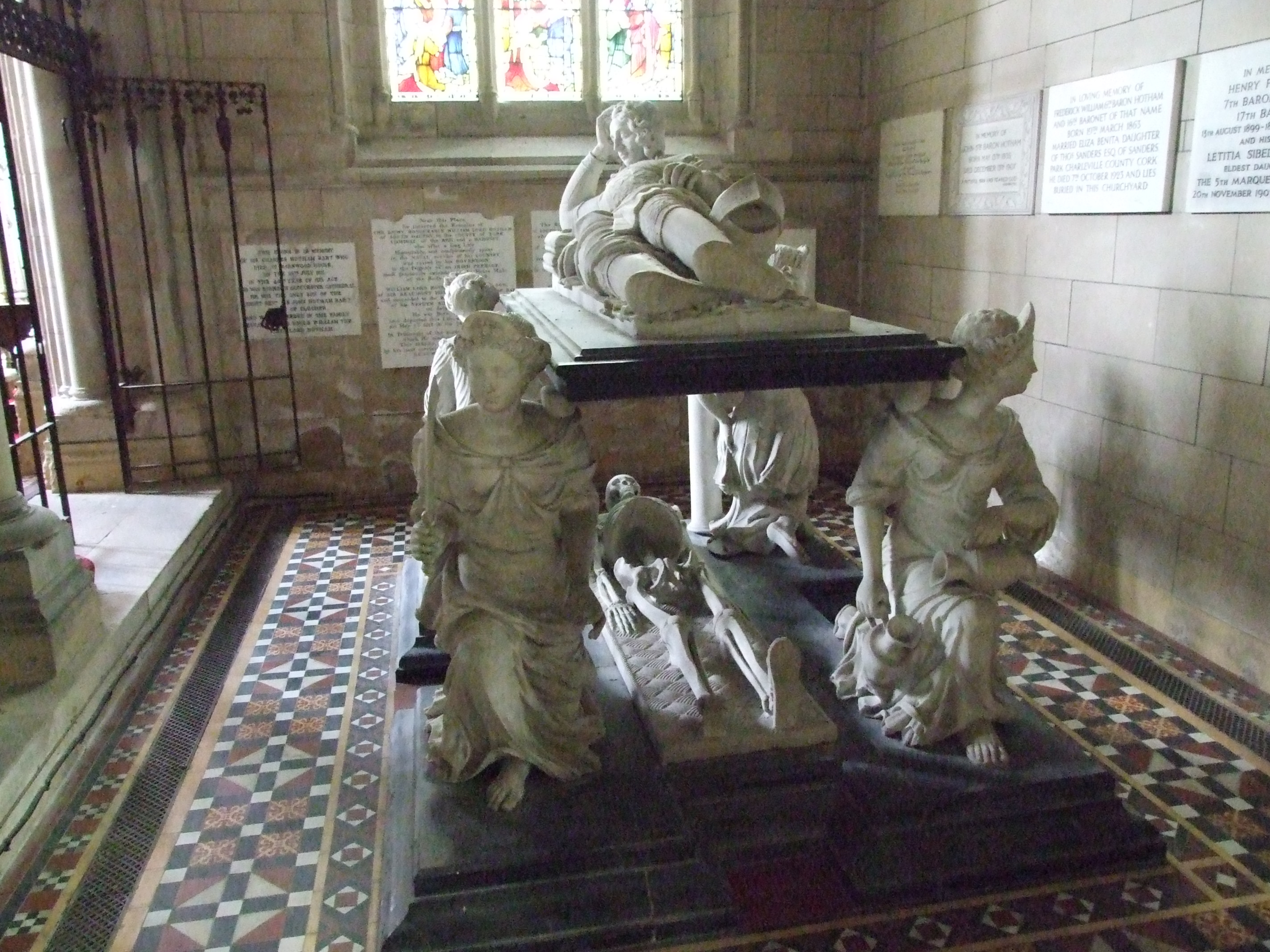
The tomb of Sir John Hotham

St Mary's Church, South Dalton was designated a Grade I listed building in 1968 and is now recorded in the National Heritage List for England, maintained by Historic England. Its spire is over 200 feet (61 m) tall and is a prominent local landmark. It was designed by John Loughborough Pearson and built from 1858 to 1861 as a replacement for a brick structure.

== See also ==
- Listed buildings in Dalton Holme
