= Grey Horse Handicap =

Flat horse race in Britain

- Class: Handicap
- Location: Newmarket Racecourse; Newmarket, England
- Inaugurated: 2003
- Race type: Flat / Thoroughbred
- Sponsor: JenningsBet

Race information
- Distance: 6 furlongs (1,207 metres)
- Surface: Turf
- Track: Straight
- Qualification: Three-years-old and up
- Weight: Handicap
- Purse: £20,000 (2025); 1st: £10,308

The Grey Horse Handicap is a flat handicap horse race in Great Britain open to grey horses aged three years or older. It is run over a distance of 6 furlongs (1,207 metres) on the July course at Newmarket in August.

== History ==
The race was inaugurated in 2003 after Newmarket Racecourse director Peter Jensen saw a similar race at Flemington Racecourse, Melbourne, Australia. The race is the only race exclusively for grey horses in Great Britain. There was controversy in 2020 when two bay horses were entered for the race despite not meeting the requirement to be a grey horse. Their ineligibility was discovered at the five day entry stage.

== Records ==
Most successful horse (2 wins):

- Middleton Grey - 2004, 2005
- Case Key – 2017, 2019

Leading jockey (2 wins):

- Ted Durcan – Compton's Eleven (2007), Syrian Pearl (2016)

Leading trainer (3 wins):

- Tony Newcombe - Middleton Grey (2004, 2005), Witchry (2010)

== Winners ==
- Weights given in stones and pounds.

Year	Winner	Age	Weight	Jockey	Trainer	SP	Time
2003	Smart Predator	7	10-00	Keith Dalgleish	John Quinn	11/4 F	1:12.39
2004	Middleton Grey	6	9-01	Johnny Murtagh	Tony Newcombe	4/1	1:12.82
2005	Middleton Grey	7	8-12	Johnny Murtagh	Tony Newcombe	5/1	1:13.35
2006	Clearing Sky	5	8-00	Matthew Henry	Jim Boyle	50/1	1:13.27
2007	Compton's Eleven	6	9-10	Ted Durcan	Mick Channon	5/1	1:13.72
2008	Finsbury	5	8-00	Nicky Mackay	Jim Goldie	13/2	1:13.46
2009	Sarah's Art	6	8-07	Jim Crowley	Stef Higgins	8/1	1:12.30
2010	Witchry	8	7-12	David Probert	Tony Newcombe	5/1	1:15.86
2011	Time Medicean	5	8-09	Raul Da Silva	Tony Carroll	11/1	1:11.96
2012	Medici Time	7	9-04	Eddie Ahern	Tim Easterby	10/1	1:10.86
2013	Crew Cut	5	9-04	Robert Tart	Jeremy Gask	8/1	1:12.74
2014	Moonspring	3	8-07	Liam Jones	Robert Cowell	20/1	1:13.39
2015	George Bowen	3	9-06	Paddy Mathers	Richard Fahey	8/1	1:10.06
2016	Syrian Pearl	5	9-10	Ted Durcan	Chris Wall	6/1	1:12.05
2017	Case Key	4	9-01	Ben Curtis	Michael Appleby	8/1	1:13.54
2018	My Amigo	5	9-07	P. J. McDonald	Marjorie Fife	5/1	1:12.86
2019	Case Key	6	8-05	Jimmy Quinn	Michael Appleby	16/1	1:11.17
2020	My Style	4	8-05	Georgia Dobie	Eve Johnson Houghton	4/1 F	1:11.07
2021	Mitrosonfire	3	9-06	Stefano Cherchi	William Muir and Chris Grassick	5/2 F	1:11.95
2022	Strike	4	8-09	Rob Hornby	Jonathan Portman	11/4 JF	1:14.06
2023	Silver Samurai	6	10-00	Andrea Atzeni	Marco Botti	17/2	1:12.12
2024	Archduke Ferdinand	5	8-11	Alex Jary	Seb Spencer	10/1	1:11.16
2025	Addison Grey	3	9-05	Jack Nicholls	Clive Cox	5/2 F	1:11.74
2026	Havana Blue	6	9-12	Ryan Sexton	Julie Camacho	6/4 F	1:11.48
