= Newmarket Racecourse =

Horse racing venue in England

Newmarket

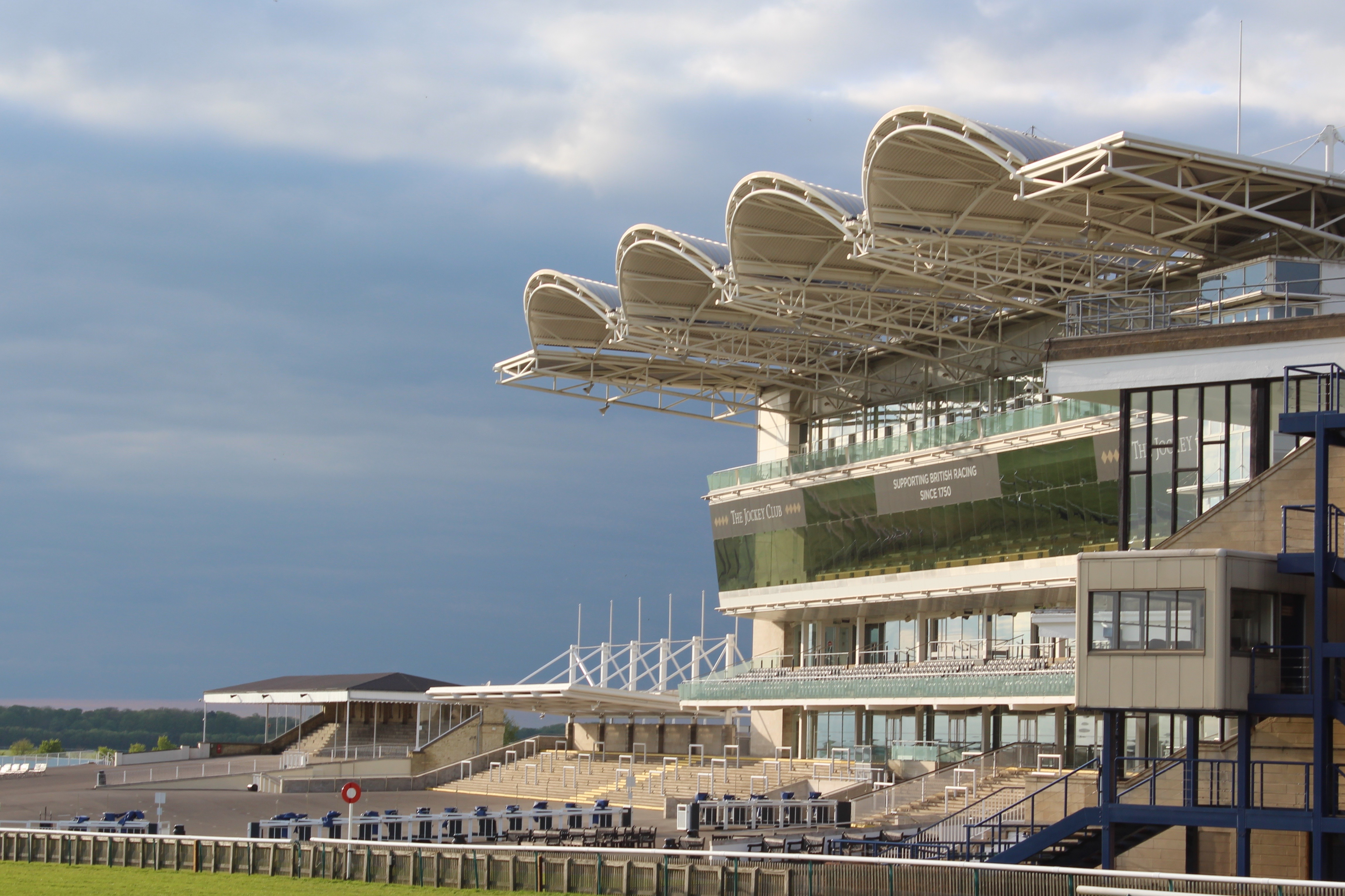
- The Rowley Mile track used for the 2000 Guineas
- Interactive map of Newmarket
- Location: Suffolk, England
- Owned by: Jockey Club Racecourses
- Date opened: 1667; 359 years ago
- Screened on: Racing TV
- Course type: Flat

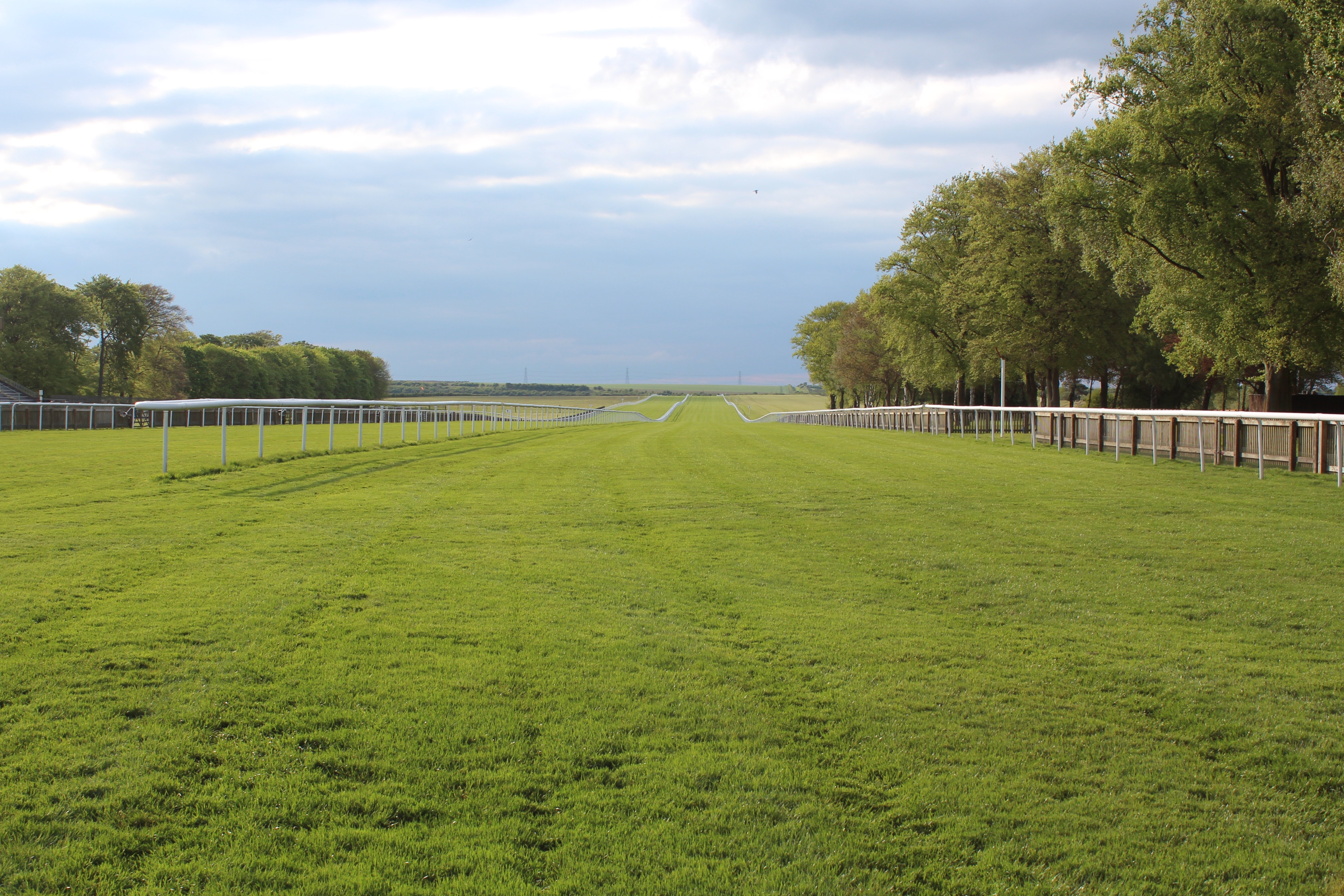
A view of The July Course track, Newmarket, UK

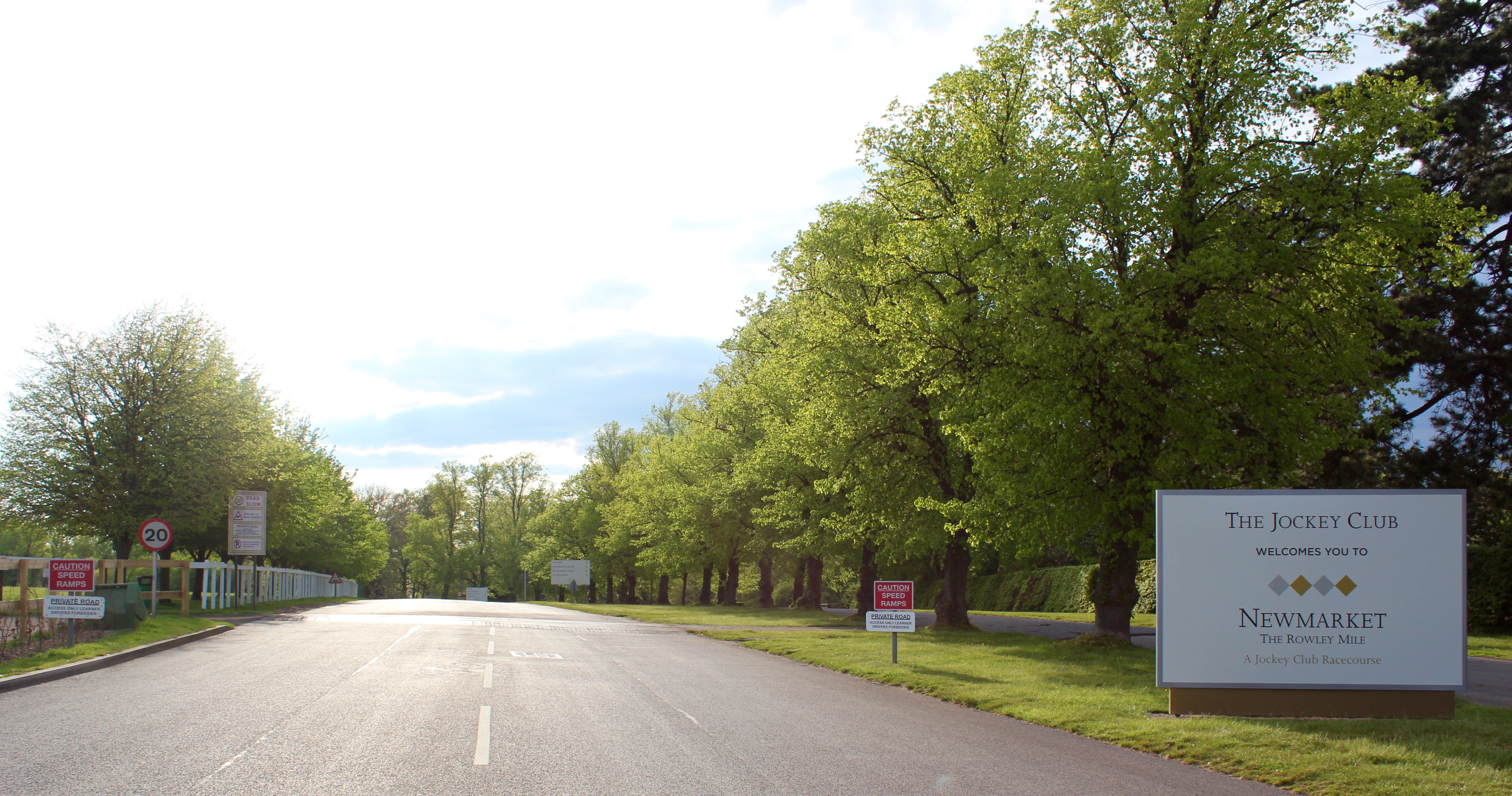
The Rowley Mile entrance, Newmarket, UK

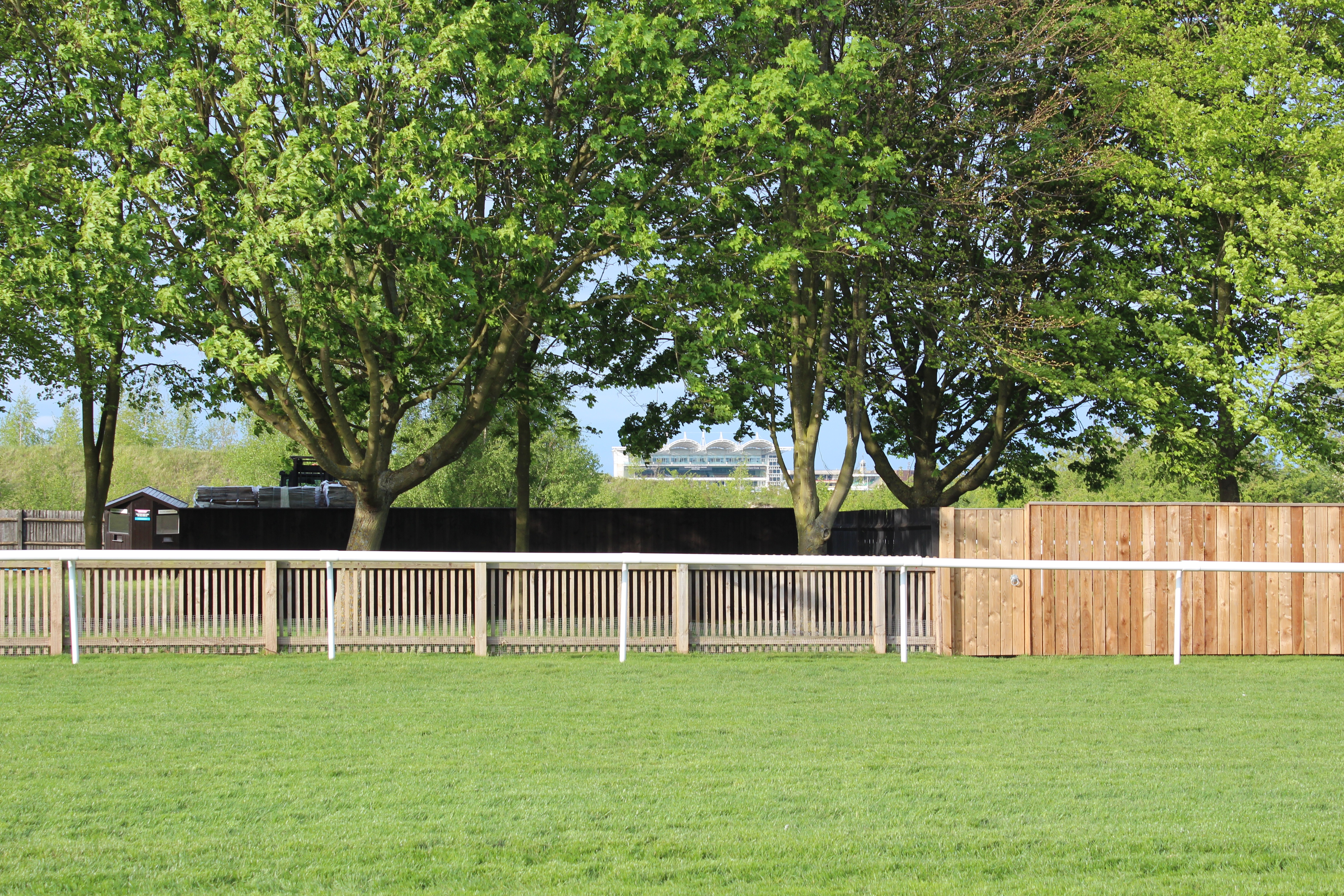
A view of The Rowley Mile from The July Course, Newmarket, UK

Newmarket Racecourse is a British Thoroughbred horse racing venue in Newmarket, Suffolk, comprising two individual racecourses: the Rowley Mile and the July Course. Newmarket is often referred to as the headquarters of British horseracing and is home to the largest cluster of training yards in the country and many key horse racing organisations, including Tattersalls, the National Horseracing Museum and the National Stud. Newmarket hosts two of the country's five Classic Races – the 1,000 Guineas and 2,000 Guineas, and numerous other Group races. In total, it hosts 9 of British racing's 38 annual Group 1 races.

== History ==
Racing in Newmarket was recorded in the time of James I. The racecourse itself was founded in 1636. Around 1665, Charles II inaugurated the Newmarket Town Plate and in 1671 became the first and only reigning monarch to ride a winner. King Charles was known to attend races on Newmarket Heath with his brother, the future James II. The first recorded race was a match for £100 between horses owned by Lord Salisbury and the Marquess of Buckingham in 1622.

Up until 1744, the two most valuable races run at the course were the King's Plate and the Town Plate. Two more Plate races were added in that year, paid for by local traders, both worth 50 guineas – one was a race for five-year-olds carrying 9 stone, one was an open age race in four mile heats. Another paid for by landowners was a four-year-old race over four miles, each carrying 8 stone 7 lbs. At that time, formal races at Newmarket only took place twice a year – once in April, once in October. A second Spring meeting was added in 1753., a second October meeting in 1762, the July meeting in 1765, the Houghton meeting in 1770 and the Craven in 1771.

By 1840, there were seven annual meetings:

- The Craven Meeting – a week, beginning Easter Monday (inaugurated 1771)
- 1st Spring Meeting – a week, beginning Easter Monday fortnight (inaugurated pre-1744)
- 2nd Spring Meeting – a week, beginning Easter Monday month (inaugurated 1753)
- July Meeting – a few days, around 10 July (inaugurated 1765)
- 1 October Meeting – a week, beginning Monday before the first Thursday in October (inaugurated pre-1744)
- 2 October Meeting – a week, beginning Monday before the third Thursday in October (inaugurated 1762)
- Houghton Meeting – a few days, beginning two weeks later (inaugurated in 1770)

== Layout ==
Newmarket Racecourses

Newmarket Racecourse is made up of two courses – the Rowley Mile Course (named after Old Rowley the favourite racehorse of King Charles II) and the July Course. Both are wide, galloping tracks used for Flat racing only, each with a capacity just over 20,000, though this is rarely met.

- The Rowley Mile Course has a 1-mile 2 furlong (2 km) straight with minor undulations towards 'The Bushes', two furlongs (400 m) out. The penultimate furlong (200 m) is downhill and the last is uphill, forming 'The Dip'. Races beyond the distance of 1m 2f start on the 'Cesarewitch' or 'Beacon' course which turns right-handed into the straight.
- The July Course, also sometimes called the Summer Course, has a 1-mile (1600 m) straight, known as 'The Bunbury Mile'. After 2 furlongs (400 m), there is a long downhill stretch before the uphill furlong (200 m) to the finish. This course also uses the 'Cesarewitch/Beacon' course for longer distances, again turning right into the straight.

Technically, there is also a third course, the Round Course, first called the King's Plate Course but this is only used once a year for the Newmarket Town Plate, a race of great historical significance, but limited importance in modern-day racing.

The Rowley Mile is used for racing in the Spring and Autumn, and hosts the majority of the Group 1 races staged at Newmarket, including the 2000 & 1000 Guineas. Up until 2010, it was the home of the Champion Stakes, Pride Stakes and Jockey Club Cup, which are now run as the Champion Stakes, British Champions Fillies' and Mares' Stakes and British Champions Long Distance Cup at Ascot on British Champions Day. The wide nature of the track means it is able to host races such as the Cambridgeshire Handicap and the Cesarewitch Handicap, which both have a maximum field size of 35, making them the largest fields for races in the UK after the Grand National. In 2005, the Rowley Mile hosted the now defunct Ascot Festival, the premier race of which was the Queen Elizabeth II Stakes, whilst the new grandstand at Ascot was being constructed.

The July Course is used in Summer, and hosts 2 Group 1 races, the July Cup and the Falmouth Stakes, both of which are run at the July Festival, the premier meeting staged at the July Course. The course is also used for several evening meetings a year, with live music after racing – these often draw a sellout crowd and are typically the highest attended of any meetings held at Newmarket throughout the year. In 1999 the entire Newmarket programme was moved to the July Course whilst the new Millennium Grandstand at the Rowley Mile was being constructed. In 2008, due to waterlogging at York, several races from the Ebor Festival were staged at the July Course, including three Group 1 races – the Yorkshire Oaks, the Nunthorpe and the Juddmonte International.

Both courses have grass airstrips for use by light aircraft, and it was taking off from one of these in June 2000, that a Piper Seneca plane carrying jockeys Ray Cochrane and Frankie Dettori crashed, killing the pilot and injuring both jockeys. The plane was headed for Goodwood in Sussex. Cochrane received the Queen's Commendation for Bravery in 2002 for saving Dettori's life. The airstrips on the Rowley Mile were used during the Second World War by the Royal Air Force (RAF) as RAF Newmarket- the most important races were moved to the July Course during this period, which was the only racecourse in the UK that remained operational throughout the war. The Devil's Dyke runs past the edge of the July course. About half of the racecourse complex, including the July and Cesarewitch/Beacon courses, is actually in the neighbouring county of Cambridgeshire.

Historically, there are various names that have been given to courses or parts of courses at Newmarket, and some are still in use today to describe particular race distances. Whyte's History of the British Turf (1840), for instance, lists the Beacon Course, Round Course, Audley End Course, Clermont Course, Ancaster Mile, Rowley Mile, Abingdon Mile, Bunbury Mile, Ditch Mile and Yearling Course.

In the late 19th and early 20th Century Newmarket also had a National Hunt course. The Links Gallops uses the course today and some of the buildings still stand adjacent to the Gallops and nearby road.

== Notable races ==
Month	DOW	Race Name	Course	Grade	Distance	Age/Sex
April	Tuesday	Federation Of Bloodstock Agents EBF Conditions Stakes	Rowley	Conditions	7f	3yo
April	Wednesday	Feilden Stakes	Rowley	Listed	1m 1f	3yo
April	Wednesday	Earl of Sefton Stakes	Rowley	Group 3	1m 1f	4yo+
April	Wednesday	Nell Gwyn Stakes	Rowley	Group 3	7f	3yo f
April	Thursday	Wood Ditton Maiden	Rowley	Maiden	6f	3yo
April	Thursday	Abernant Stakes	Rowley	Group 3	6f	3yo+
April	Thursday	Craven Stakes	Rowley	Group 3	1m	3yo c&g
May	Friday	Newmarket Stakes	Rowley	Listed	1m 2f	3yo c&g
May	Friday	Jockey Club Stakes	Rowley	Group 2	1m 4f	4yo+
May	Friday	King Charles II Stakes	Rowley	Listed	7f	3yo
May	Saturday	Ellen Chaloner Stakes	Rowley	Listed	6f	3yo+ f
May	Saturday	Betfred Handicap	Rowley	Heritage Handicap	6f	4yo+
May	Saturday	Suffolk Stakes	Rowley	Heritage Handicap	1m 1f	3yo+
May	Saturday	Palace House Stakes	Rowley	Group 3	5f	3yo+
May	Saturday	2000 Guineas Stakes	Rowley	Group 1	1m	3yo c&f
May	Sunday	Pretty Polly Stakes	Rowley	Listed	1m 2f	3yo f
May	Sunday	Dahlia Stakes	Rowley	Group 2	1m 1f	4yo+ f
May	Sunday	Betfred Handicap	Rowley	Heritage Handicap	1m 6f	4yo+
May	Sunday	1000 Guineas Stakes	Rowley	Group 1	1m	3yo f
June	Thursday	Empress Stakes	July	Listed	6f	2yo f
July	Thursday	Bahrain Trophy	July	Group 3	1m 5f	3yo
July	Thursday	July Stakes	July	Group 2	6f	2yo c&g
July	Thursday	Betway Handicap	July	Heritage Handicap	6f	3yo
July	Thursday	Princess of Wales's Stakes	July	Group 2	1m 4f	3yo+
July	Thursday	Sir Henry Cecil Stakes	July	Listed	1m	3yo
July	Friday	Oddschecker Handicap	July	Heritage Handicap	1m 2f	3yo
July	Friday	Duchess of Cambridge Stakes	July	Group 2	6f	2yo f
July	Friday	Betway Trophy	July	Heritage Handicap	1m 6f	4yo+
July	Friday	Falmouth Stakes	July	Group 1	1m	3yo+ f
July	Saturday	Bunbury Cup	July	Heritage Handicap	7f	3yo+
July	Saturday	Superlative Stakes	July	Group 2	7f	2yo
July	Saturday	July Cup	July	Group 1	6f	3yo+
July	Saturday	Aphrodite Stakes	July	Listed	1m 4f	3yo+ f
July/Aug	Saturday	Chalice Stakes	July	Listed	1m 4f	3yo+ f
August	Saturday	Sweet Solera Stakes	July	Group 3	7f	2yo f
August	Saturday	Grey Horse Handicap	July	Handicap	6f	3yo+
August	Saturday	Hopeful Stakes	July	Listed	6f	3yo+
August	Saturday	£200,000 Tattersalls Somerville Auction Stakes	July	Sales	6f	2yo
September	Thursday	Somerville Tattersall Stakes	Rowley	Group 3	7f	2yo c&g
September	Thursday	Jockey Club Rose Bowl	Rowley	Listed	2m	3yo+
September	Friday	Rosemary Stakes	Rowley	Listed	1m	3yo+ f
September	Friday	Princess Royal Stakes	Rowley	Group 3	1m 4f	3yo+ f
September	Friday	Rockfel Stakes	Rowley	Group 2	7f	2yo f
September	Friday	Joel Stakes	Rowley	Group 2	1m	3yo+
September	Friday	Godolphin Stakes	Rowley	Listed	1m 4f	3yo
September	Saturday	Royal Lodge Stakes	Rowley	Group 2	1m	2yo c&g
September	Saturday	Cheveley Park Stakes	Rowley	Group 1	6f	2yo f
October	Saturday	Middle Park Stakes	Rowley	Group 1	6f	2yo c
September	Saturday	Cambridgeshire Handicap	Rowley	Heritage Handicap	1m 1f	3yo+
October	Saturday	£200,000 Tattersalls October Auction Stakes	July	Sales	7f	2yo
October	Saturday	Sun Chariot Stakes	Rowley	Group 1	1m	3yo+ f
October	Friday	Cornwallis Stakes	Rowley	Group 3	5f	2yo
October	Friday	Oh So Sharp Stakes	Rowley	Group 3	7f	2yo f
October	Friday	Challenge Stakes	Rowley	Group 2	7f	3yo+
October	Friday	Fillies' Mile	Rowley	Group 1	1m	2yo f
October	Friday	Old Rowley Cup	Rowley	Heritage Handicap	1m 4f	3yo
October	Friday	Boadicea Stakes	Rowley	Listed	6f	3yo+ f
October	Friday	Pride Stakes	Rowley	Group 3	1m 2f	3yo+ f
October	Saturday	Darley Stakes	Rowley	Group 3	1m 1f	3yo+
October	Saturday	Zetland Stakes	Rowley	Group 3	1m 2f	2yo
October	Saturday	Autumn Stakes	Rowley	Group 3	1m	2yo
October	Saturday	Dewhurst Stakes	Rowley	Group 1	7f	2yo c&f
October	Saturday	Cesarewitch Handicap	Rowley	Heritage Handicap	2m 2f	3yo+
Oct/Nov	Friday	Bosra Sham Stakes	Rowley	Listed	6f	2yo f
Oct/Nov	Saturday	Montrose Stakes	Rowley	Listed	1m	2yo f
Oct/Nov	Saturday	James Seymour Stakes	Rowley	Listed	1m 2f	3yo+

The King's Plate (or Queen's Plate) was a major race run between 1634 and 1765.

== Locations ==
52°13′51.1″N 0°22′56.1″E (Location of Carpark)

52°14′15″N 0°22′28″E (Rowley Mile)

52°13′47.5″N 0°21′43.5″E (July Course)

== See also ==
- Newbury Racecourse

== Bibliography ==
- Barrett, Norman, ed. (1995). The Daily Telegraph Chronicle of Horse Racing. Enfield, Middlesex: Guinness Publishing.
- Cawthorne, George James; Herod, Richard S. (1902). Royal Ascot, Its History & Its Associations (PDF). London: A Treherne & Co.
- Whyte, James Christie (1840). History of the British turf, from the earliest period to the present day, Volume I. London: H. Colburn. OL 6544990M.
- Official website
- Course guide on GG.COM
- Course guide on At The Races
