= Poker Player =

British poker magazine

- Editor: Alun Bowden
- Categories: Poker
- Frequency: Monthly
- Publisher: People Like You Publishing
- First issue: August 2005
- Company: People Like You Publishing
- Country: United Kingdom

Poker Player, formerly Total Gambler, is a monthly British poker magazine. The magazine is published by People Like You Publishing, who acquired the title in February 2013, and edited by Alun Bowden.

== History and profile ==
It was launched by the owner of Maxim magazine, Dennis Publishing, in August 2005. To capitalise on the recent surge in popularity for online gambling, the company created Total Gambler alongside another magazine, The Sportsman, which was scheduled to launch in early 2006. Dennis Publishing, which also owns a magazine for expert gamblers called Inside Poker, created the magazine after it was convinced that there is still significant advertising potential from online gambling companies. The goal of Total Gambler is to provide an introduction to gambling for 18- to 40-year-old men. With an initial print run of 650,000, the magazine was Britain's most widely circulated monthly men's magazine when it launched. The magazine is given away free with Maxim and other magazines published by Dennis Publishing aimed at young men, such as Bizarre, Computer Shopper, and Men's Fitness. The magazine employs less than a dozen staff. Before the magazine launched, Downey predicted, "Total Gambler will bring gambling news and strategy to a mass audience in a light, 28-page entry-level magazine."

Before the magazine's launch, Charlie Methven, the former Daily Telegraph journalist who later edited The Sportsman, argued that "Dennis has enjoyed success with its existing stand-alone gambling magazine, Inside Edge, launched in April 2004, but that the new title is simply an attempt to exploit this success and get extra advertising revenues". Calling Total Gambler "Dennis's ghastly low-rent bandwagon", Methven commented, "Inside Edge is a high-quality gambling publication. This [Total Gambler] is a shitty ad-get." The magazine's first issue contained 28 pages.
