= Holme on the Wolds =

Village in the East Riding of Yorkshire, England

Coordinates: 53.905015°N 0.529304°W

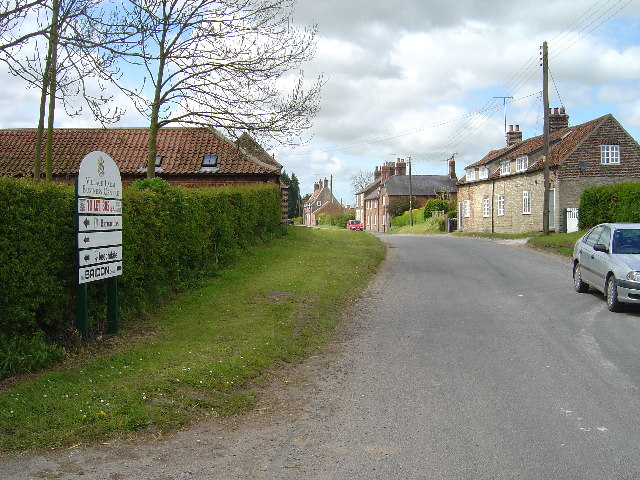

- Location within the East Riding of Yorkshire
- OS grid reference: SE967464
  - London: 165 mi (266 km) S
- Civil parish: Dalton Holme
- Unitary authority: East Riding of Yorkshire
- Ceremonial county: East Riding of Yorkshire
- Region: Yorkshire and the Humber
- Country: England
- Sovereign state: United Kingdom
- Post town: BEVERLEY
- Postcode district: HU17
- Dialling code: 01430
- Police: Humberside
- Fire: Humberside
- Ambulance: Yorkshire
- UK Parliament: Beverley and Holderness

Holme on the Wolds is a village and former civil parish, now in the parish of Dalton Holme, in the East Riding of Yorkshire, England. It is situated approximately 6 miles (10 km) north-east of the market town of Market Weighton and 5.5 miles (9 km) north-west of the market town of Beverley. In 1931 the parish had a population of 132. On 1 April 1935 the parish was abolished and merged with South Dalton to form "Dalton Holme". It lies to west of the B1248 road.

The village forms part of and is run by the Dalton Estate, which is owned by the Hotham family.

Holme on the Wolds was listed as "Hougon" in the Domesday Book. The name is believed to derive from the Old Norse word haugr meaning hills or mound.

In 1823 Holme on the Wolds was a village and civil parish in the Wapentake of Harthill. Population at the time was 138, with occupations including five farmers, a boot & shoe maker, a blacksmith, and a shopkeeper.

== See also ==
- Listed buildings in Dalton Holme
