= Horse racing in Wales =

Horse racing in Wales has a long tradition dating back to the 18th century. Wales has held flat racing, National Hunt and harness racing, and presently has three racecourses, at Chepstow, Bangor-on-Dee and Ffos Las. The Welsh Grand National is held annually at Chepstow between Christmas and New Year and is the highlight of the Welsh racing calendar.

== History ==
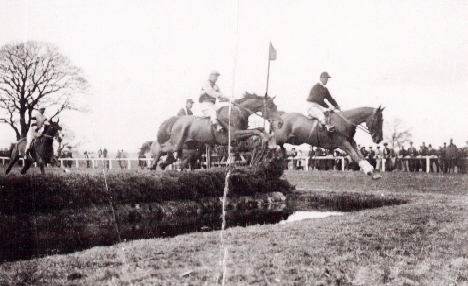
Steeplechasing at Bangor-Is-Coed circa 1930

Organised horse racing in Wales originated with the gentry and aristocracy and among the earliest organised racing were point-to-point meetings. By 1833 there were internationally recognised flat races at many locations around the country, including Cowbridge, Haverfordwest, Conwy, Aberystwyth, Brecon and Wrexham. The Cowbridge races were very popular and attracted entries from as far away as Yorkshire. Steeplechasing began at Bangor-on-Dee racecourse in the 1850s and is still a racecourse to this day.

When diarist John Byng in 1787 mentioned that he was passing 'not far from Cowbridge race ground' he was acknowledging the fame of the race meetings, which had grown from a family occasion into 'the Glamorgan races'. Early races were the scene of heavy betting and attracted other entertainments as diverse as exclusive balls, pig racing and prostitution. This brought large crowds to races and a mingling of the social classes though the sport itself remained in the control of the gentry. The Welsh gentry used horseracing to integrate themselves with their English counterparts, to gain a place for themselves in an elite British culture. In the mid and later 19th century there was growing pressure from religious quarters due to what was seen as the immoral and drunkenly behaviour that accompanied race days. This led to the Wrexham Races being abandoned between 1862 and 1890.

The 20th century saw the Welsh working class embrace the sport, mainly due to newspaper coverage and the spread of off-course betting. 1926 saw the opening of Chepstow Racecourse at St Arvans, and although remaining on the margins of British horseracing until the opening of the Severn Bridge in 1966, it is now the country's premier course. Chepstow holds the Welsh National, which is held annually between Christmas and New Year. Due to the growth of other leisure activities and the cost of keeping and breeding horse, flat and national hunt racing went into long-term decline in Wales from the middle of the 19th century. From the middle of the 20th century most of the country's racecourses had closed. Today only three racecourses survive in Wales, Chepstow, Bangor-on-Dee and Ffos Las which was opened in 2009.

=== Harness racing ===
A popular, if unusual, form of horseracing in Wales is harness racing, known in Wales as 'trotting'. The sport involves horses racing at a non-galloping gait while being driven by men or women poised on two wheeled 'sulkies'. The sport grew in Wales in the late 19th century, originally involving Welsh cobs competing along roads. As the popularity of the sport rose, the races were transferred to grass tracks and 'standard bred' horses were imported from America to replace the native breeds. The oldest trotting meet in Wales is the Llangadog which has been held every Easter Monday since 1884. In 1990, 'Tir Prince' an American-style raceway was opened in Towyn which now holds 13 races a year, many of which are shown on Welsh language television channel S4C on its programme Rasus. Tregaron Trotting Club is host to the biggest festival of harness racing in the UK, an annual three day meeting on the last weekend in August.

== Notable Welsh jockeys ==
Wales has produced several jockeys of note, including Jack Anthony who won the Grand National on three occasions (1911, 1915 and 1920), Hywel Davies who won it in 1985 and Carl Llewellyn who won the race in 1992 and again in 1998. Another notable Welsh jockey was Dick Francis, who was British jump racing Champion Jockey in the 1953-54 season and was famous for riding Devon Loch when the horse slipped close to the winning post when leading the 1956 Grand National. In retirement Francis became a best-selling author of crime novels set in the racing world.

Two jockeys have been inducted into the Welsh Sports Hall of Fame. Jack Anthony and Geoff Lewis, who in 1971 won both the Derby and the Prix de l'Arc de Triomphe on Mill Reef.

== Racehorse training in Wales ==
Two horses trained in Wales have won Britain's premier steeplechase, the Cheltenham Gold Cup; Patron Saint in 1928 and Norton's Coin in 1990. Norton's Coin, at 100-1, is the longest-priced winner of the race and won in a then-record time. He was trained by his owner, Sirrel Griffiths, a dairy farmer from Nantgaredig in Carmarthenshire.

In the first decade of the 21st century, several trainers based in Wales have made an impact in National Hunt racing. Evan Williams, based in the Vale of Glamorgan, and Peter Bowen from Pembrokeshire have established themselves as successful trainers while Tim Vaughan, also from the Vale of Glamorgan, has started out on a training career with some success. Nigel Twiston-Davies, trainer of two Grand National winners and Imperial Commander, the 2010 Cheltenham Gold Cup winner, is Welsh, although his training stables are in England.

== Bibliography ==
- Davies, John; Jenkins, Nigel; Menna, Baines; Lynch, Peredur I., eds. (2008). The Welsh Academy Encyclopaedia of Wales. Cardiff: University of Wales Press. ISBN 978-0-7083-1953-6.
