= St Mary's Church, South Dalton =

Church in South Dalton, East Riding of Yorkshire, England

Coordinates: 53.8972°N 0.5295°W

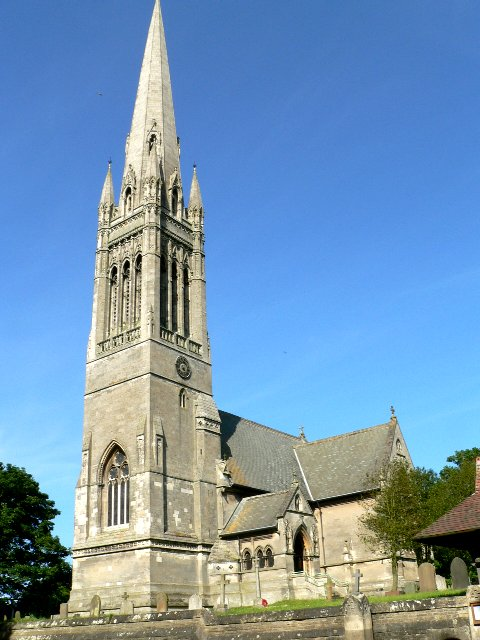
The church, in 2006

St Mary's Church is the parish church of South Dalton, a village in the East Riding of Yorkshire, in England.

South Dalton had a church in the mediaeval period, which in 1848 was described as "an ancient edifice, with a tower". It was demolished and rebuilt between 1858 and 1861. The new church was commissioned by Beaumont Hotham and designed by John Loughborough Pearson in the Gothic revival style. It cost £25,000 and Nikolaus Pevsner praises its steeple as "tall, extremely slender and noble in outline". A vestry was added in 1878, again designed by Pearson. The building was grade I listed in 1968.

The church is built of stone with a slate roof, and consists of a nave, a south porch, north and south transepts, a chancel with north and south chapels and a north vestry. There is a west steeple, which is 208 feet (63 m) high. The steeple has a tower with three stages, a moulded plinth, a moulded band with blank quatrefoils, buttresses, a four-light pointed west window with a hood mould, and three-light bell openings above which is a balustrade of trefoil-headed openings. The bell openings are flanked by clasping buttresses rising to an octagonal spire. There is a carved corbel table with five ornate bands, a low parapet, and a tall octagonal spire with two tiers of lucarnes, short flanking pinnacles and a weathervane.

Inside, the fittings were all designed by Pearson. There are several stained glass windows designed by Clayton and Bell, most notably the east window depicting the Last Judgement. There are also a number of graves of the Hotham family; the older monuments were transferred from the earlier church. There is a black and white marble monument in memory of Sir John Hotham, 2nd Baronet which is based on the Cecil tomb at Hatfield and dates from after 1697. It may have been carved by Caius Gabriel Cibber, or John Bushnell. Sir John is represented in life, as a reclining knight in full armour, with his helmet and gauntlet beside him, and in death, as a skeleton. Supporting the four corners of the tomb are statues representing the cardinal virtues.

The organ is a three manual instrument by William Hill dating from 1877 with additions by the local Hull firm, Foster & Andrews, in 1897.

== See also ==
- Grade I listed buildings in the East Riding of Yorkshire
- Listed buildings in Dalton Holme
