= Dalton Hall, East Riding of Yorkshire =

Georgian country house in the East Riding of Yorkshire, England

Coordinates: 53.8931°N 0.5470°W

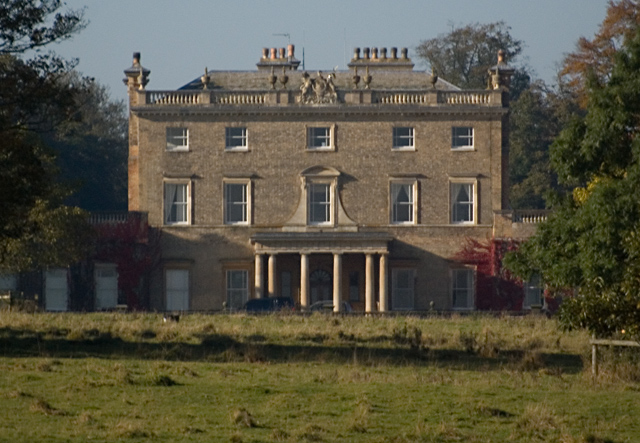
Dalton Hall

Dalton Hall is a Grade-II* listed Georgian country house in Dalton Holme, East Riding of Yorkshire, England.

It is constructed of grey brick with stone dressing and a slate roof. The main block is built in three storeys with a five-bay frontage and single storey flanking wings linking to one and two-storey pavilions.

== History ==
The Hotham family acquired the former manor house that stood east of the present Hall in the late 17th century. John Hotham had been created 1st Baronet Hotham of Scorborough in 1622 and was High Sheriff of Yorkshire for 1634. The present hall was built between 1771 and 1775 by Thomas Atkinson of York for Sir Charles Hotham-Thompson, 8th Baronet. In 1797 Sir William Hotham, 11th Baronet was elevated to the Irish Peerage as 1st Baron Hotham. Beaumont Hotham, 3rd Baron Hotham was a general in the British Army who fought at Salamanca, Vitoria and Waterloo. He was MP for Leominster from 1820 to 1841 and for the East Riding of Yorkshire from 1841 to 1868.

The building was then remodelled in 1872–77 by Payne & Talbot of Birmingham for the 5th Baron Hotham, involving the addition of balustrades and the replacement of Atkinson’s east entrance porch with a colonnade.

In 1954–45 further extensive remodelling of the hall took place during the tenure of the 8th Baron. The house is still occupied by the Hotham family.

== Architecture ==
=== House ===
The house is built of grey brick with stone dressings and slate roofs. The main block has three storeys and five bays, with single-storey three -bay wings linked to three-bay pavilions, the south with two storeys and the north with one. The main block has a floor band, a dentilled cornice, and a balustraded parapet with a central achievement and piers with urn. In the centre is a hexastyle portico with an entablature and a blocking course, and a doorway with an architrave, and a fanlight with radial glazing. The windows are sashes, the window above the doorway in chambranles under a segmental pediment, the others on the lower two floors under floating cornices, and on the top floor the middle window in an architrave, and the others under flat brick arches.

=== Summer Pavilion ===
The Summer Pavilion is a grade I listed building in Dalton Wood, to the west of the hall. It was constructed between 1733 and 1734. It is built of rendered brick on a plinth, with stone dressings, and a slate roof. There is a single storey and a tripartite front, containing Tuscan columns with vermiculated bands and quoins. In the centre, steps lead up to a round-arched entrance with a Greek key impost band, and a vermiculated keystone, and the windows are sashes. There is an entablature, raked cornices, and a pediment over the doorway, and on the top are spherical urns with vermiculated equatorial bands.

=== Stables ===
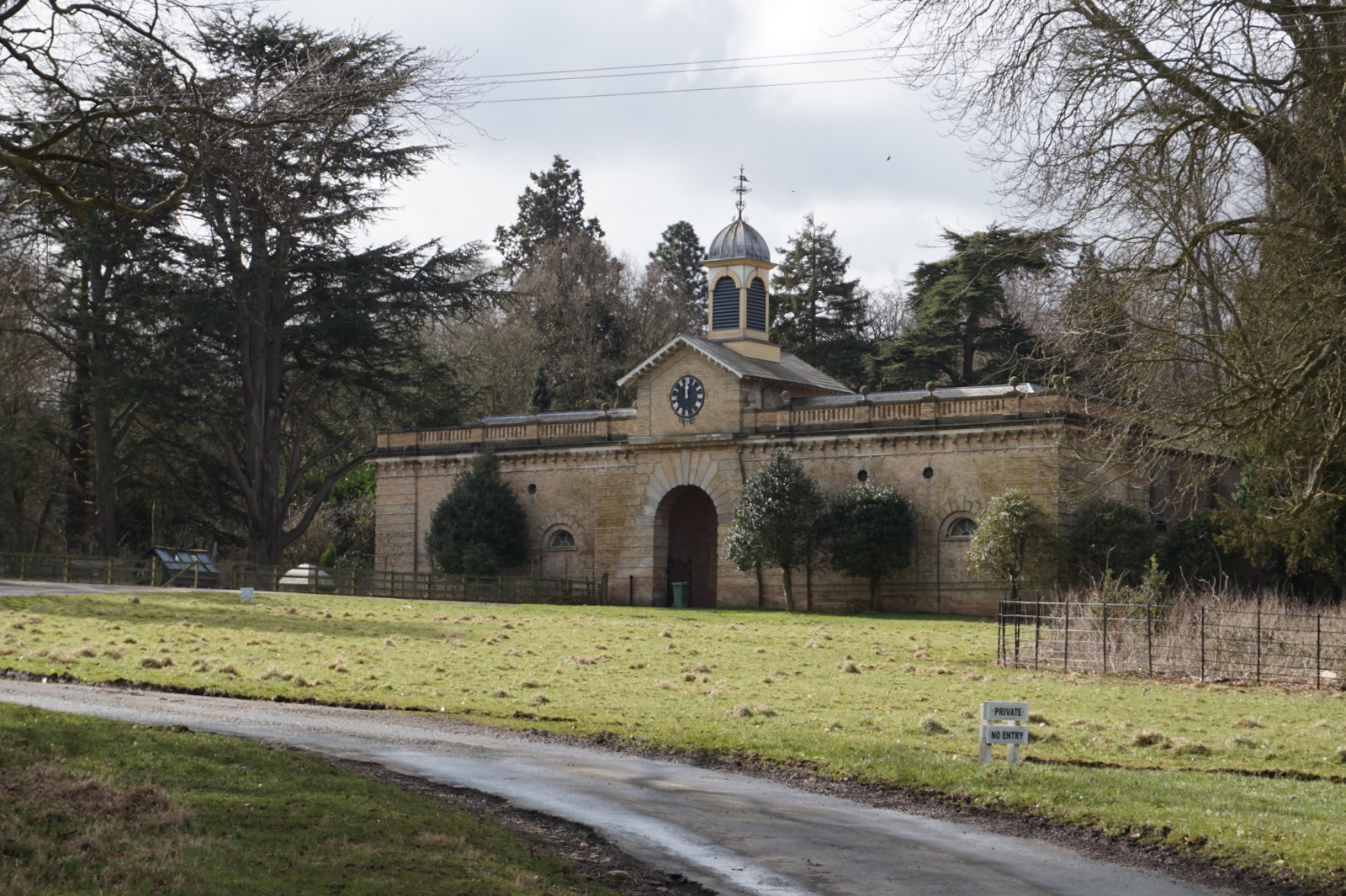
The stables

The grade II-listed stable block was built in the late 18th century. It is constructed of red and grey brick with slate roofs, and forms a quadrangular plan. The main front has seven bays, a bracketed cornice and a balustraded parapet. The middle bay projects slightly and contains a round-arched opening with a rusticated surround. Above it is a low clock tower with rusticated quoins, a clock face, and oversailing eaves, on which is a louvred lantern containing round-arched openings with keystones, a cornice, and a pyramidal lead dome with a weathervane. The outer bays contain smaller round-arched openings with fanlights and rusticated surrounds, and above are oculi with rusticated surrounds and keystones.

== See also ==
- Grade I listed buildings in the East Riding of Yorkshire
- Listed buildings in Dalton Holme
