= Dalton Holme =

Civil parish in the East Riding of Yorkshire, England

Coordinates: 53°53′57″N 0°33′40″W

- Civil parish
- Population: 198 (2011 census)
- OS grid reference: SE945457
- Civil parish: Dalton Holme
- Unitary authority: East Riding of Yorkshire
- Ceremonial county: East Riding of Yorkshire
- Region: Yorkshire and the Humber
- Country: England
- Sovereign state: United Kingdom
- Post town: BEVERLEY
- Postcode district: HU17
- Dialling code: 01430
- Police: Humberside
- Fire: Humberside
- Ambulance: Yorkshire
- UK Parliament: Beverley and Holderness

Dalton Holme a civil parish in the East Riding of Yorkshire in England. It is situated 5 miles (8 km) to the north-west from the market town of Beverley and covering an area of 1,360.063 hectares (3,360.79 acres).

It is made up of two villages, South Dalton and Holme on the Wolds, which over the years have become joined. Both the villages are run by the Dalton Estate, owned by the Hotham Family, and are occupied by estate workers and paying tenants. The 18th century Dalton Hall is the home of Lord Hotham, whose family have owned land in the area for generations. The hall was designated a Grade II* listed building in 1952 and is now recorded in the National Heritage List for England, maintained by Historic England.

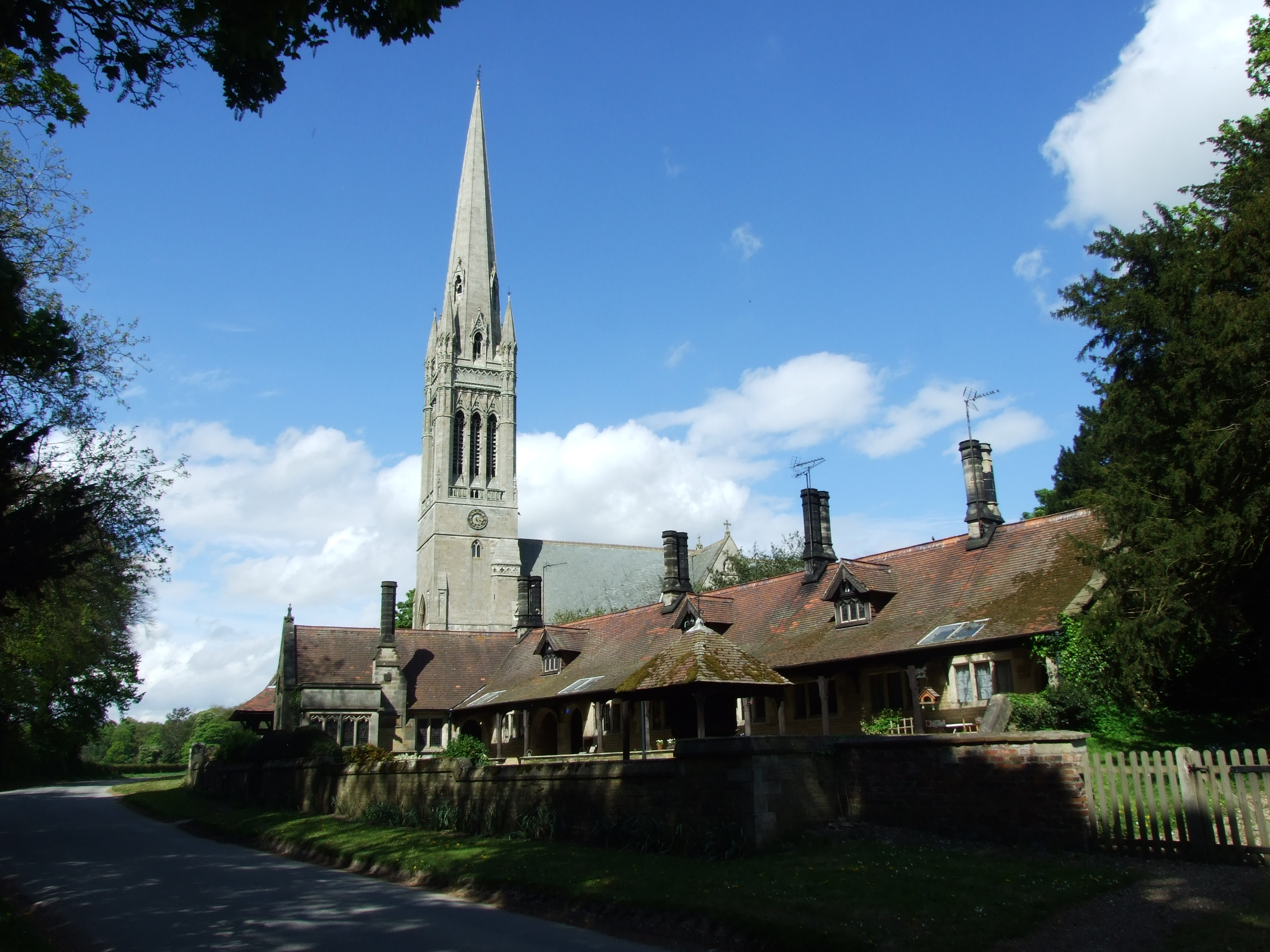
St Mary's church seen beyond the village alms houses.

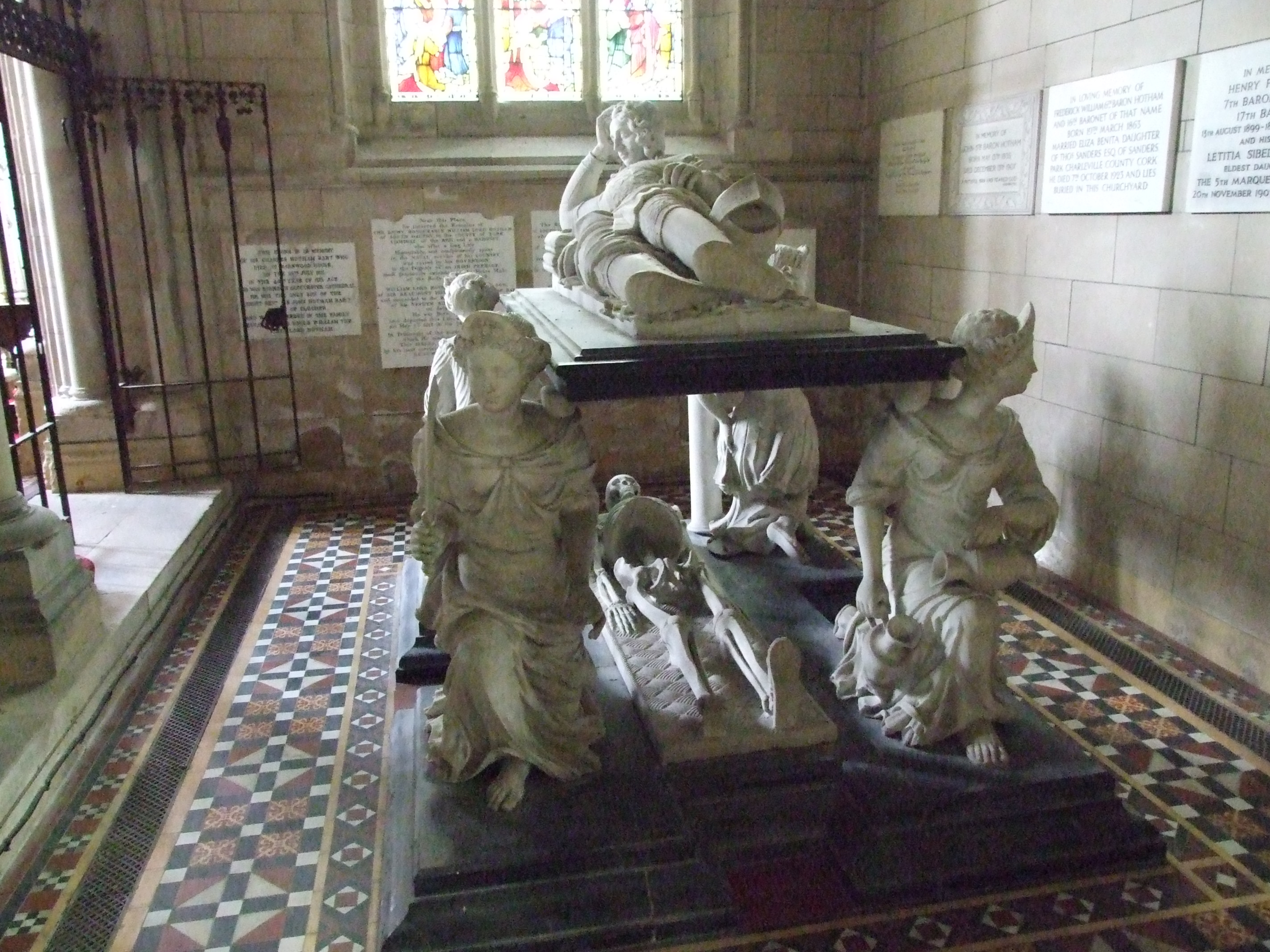
The tomb of Sir John Hotham

The spire of St Mary's, the 19th-century church, is over 200 feet (61 m) high and can be seen for miles around. It was built to the design of John Loughborough Pearson in 1858 to replace an older parish church.

Inside the church are a number of monuments to the Hotham family; the older monuments were transferred from the earlier church. One, in black and white marble, is in memory of John Hotham. It dates from after 1697 and is said to have come from Italy. Sir John is represented in life as a reclining knight in full armour, with his helmet and gauntlet beside him, and in death, as a skeleton. Supporting the four corners of the tomb are statues representing the cardinal virtues.

Dalton Estate Office is in the village of South Dalton. The Estate domestic buildings are rows of cottages and Tudor style houses, some having plates that record dates back to 1706.

The local public house is the Pipe and Glass Inn, situated near the entrance gates to the road through Dalton Park, leading to Dalton Hall, 1,200 yards (1,097.3 m) west from the village.

The Communist Member of Parliament Cecil L'Estrange Malone was born there on 7 September 1890.

According to the 2011 UK census, Dalton Holme parish had a population of 198, an increase of one on the 2001 UK census figure.

== See also ==
- Listed buildings in Dalton Holme
