= The Sportsman (2006 newspaper) =

Short lived British newspaper

The Sportsman was a daily sports newspaper published in the United Kingdom for seven months during 2006.

== History ==
It was launched on 22 March and intended to complement Dennis Publishing's gambling magazine, Total Gambler. It was the brainchild of editor-in-chief Charlie Methven, and the UK's first new national daily newspaper since the launch of the Daily Sport in 1991. It claimed to be a one-stop shop for the modern punter, offering news, views and tips on sport, racing and anything else bookmakers give odds on.

== Demise ==
Sales reached 22,333 in May, some way short of its target break-even figure of 40,000. The publisher went into administration in July. A subsequent attempt to refinance its debt failed, and the paper ceased publication on 5 October.
