= Newmarket Town Plate =

British horse race

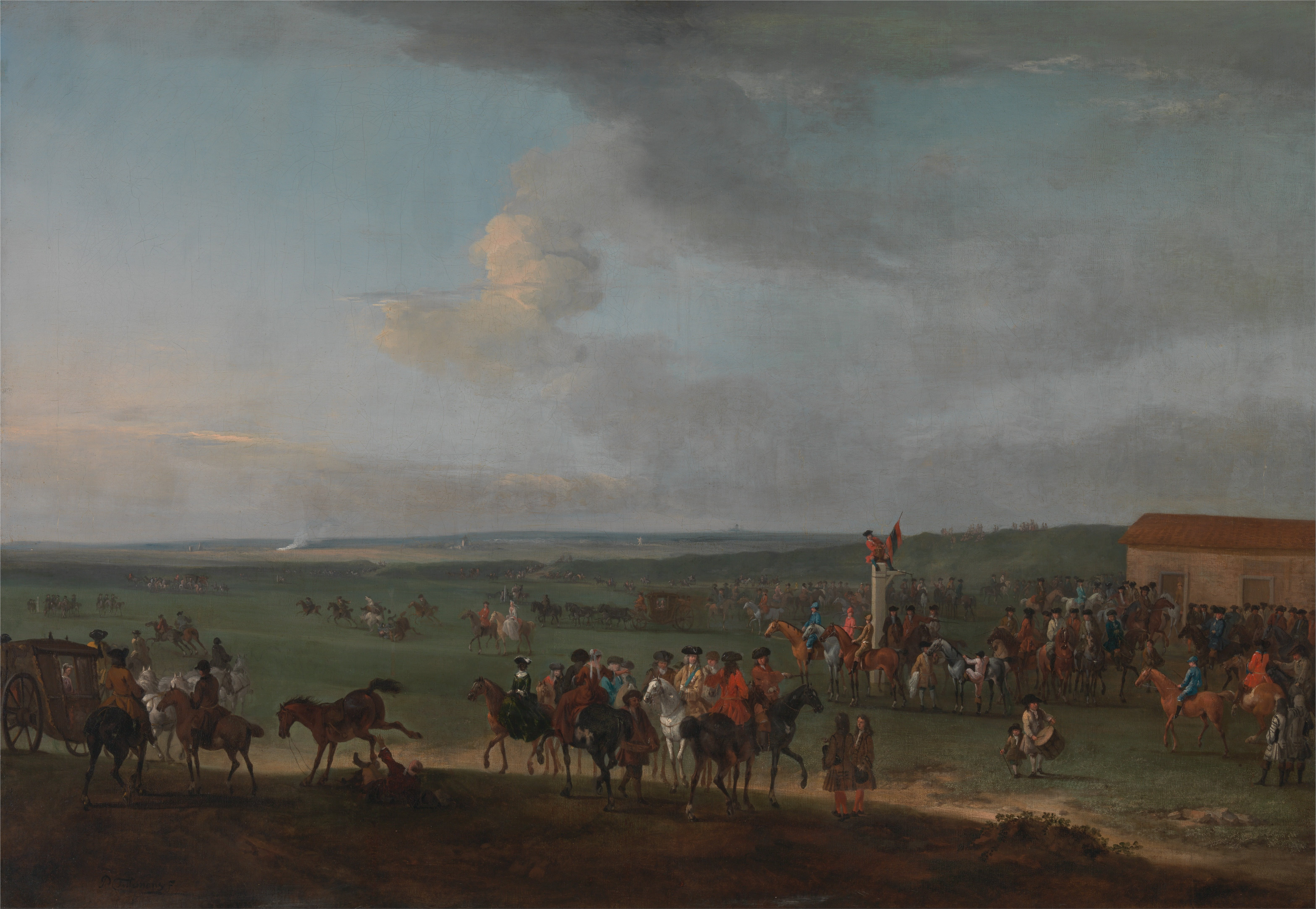
"The Round Course at Newmarket, Cambridgeshire, Preparing for the King's Plate" - Peter Tillemans (1684-1734)

The Newmarket Town Plate is an historic British horse race which has been run in the town of Newmarket, Suffolk since 1665 or 1666. The race was instigated by King Charles II, who became the first and only reigning monarch to win a race in 1671. He stated that it should be run 'forever'. The regulations have altered since the 1665 articles establishing it. Originally a prestigious race attracting leading thoroughbreds, it is now a minor event for local horses held at the end of the Newmarket racing season.

It is run over 3 mile 6 furlongs of the Newmarket Round Course, which runs “on the outside of the Ditch from Newmarket ... starting and ending at the weighing post, by Cambridge Gap, called Thomond’s Post.” It is only used once a year for this race.

Reputedly, the Plate was the first race to be run with a specific set of Rules. These included:

- "Every rider that layeth hold on, or striketh any of the riders, shall win no plate or prize"
- "Whosoever winneth the plate or prize shall give to the Clerk of the Course twenty shillings, to be distributed to the poor both sides of Newmarket, and twenty shillings to the Clerk of the Race for which he is to keep the course plain and free from cart roots"
- "No man is admitted to ride for this prize that is either a serving man or groom"

By 1830, the 1665 land endowment which funded the prize provided an annual income of only £14, so that in many years there were no entrants to the race.

The prizes for the contest include a box of famed Powter’s Newmarket sausages. The 2012 edition of the race, the 342nd Town Plate, was won by amateur jockey, Clare Twemlow, on a horse called Raifteiri. In 2011, the 341st Town Plate was won by Newmarket trainer and town councillor John Berry, riding his own horse Kadouchski.

First run in 1666, it was held continuously until 1939, the 274th running. The first woman to win was Eileen Joel, Solomon Joel's daughter, who rode Hogir to success in the 1925 event. It was not staged for the 5 War years 1940–44, but returned in 1945, the 275th running. It was then run continuously up to 2019, the 349th running, but was not held in 2020. The historic 350th running took place in 2021 and was won by Rachel Rennie, who had hoped to compete in 2016 but withdrew to undertake breast cancer treatment. The 351st running took place on Saturday 27 August 2022 and was won by Goldencard ridden by Laura Gibson-Brabazon and trained by Christian Williams. The 352nd running took place on Saturday 26 August 2023 and was won by Dancing Shadow ridden by Belinda Rose and trained by Sarah Humphrey, beating Don Bersy, ridden by Ryan Potter, by half a length. The 355rd took place on August 22 2026 and was won by Alibey ridden by Peter O'Reilly and trained by Dylan Cunha, beating Jet Of Magic, ridden by Ian Holt, by three lengths. In 2022, high temperatures led to the race being shortened to 2 miles. This occurred again in 2025 and 2026, with distances reduced to 2 miles and 1 furlong.
