= Beeswing Stakes =

Discontinued flat horse race in Britain

- Class: Group 3
- Location: Newcastle Racecourse; Newcastle, England
- Inaugurated: 1977
- Final run: 24 July 1999
- Race type: Flat / Thoroughbred
- Website: Newcastle

Race information
- Distance: 7f (1,408 metres)
- Surface: Turf
- Track: Straight
- Qualification: Three-years-old and up
- Purse: £30,000 (1999); 1st: £19,164

The Beeswing Stakes was a Group 3 flat horse race in Great Britain open to thoroughbreds aged three years or older. It was run at Newcastle over a distance of 7 furlongs (1,408 metres), and it was scheduled to take place each year in late July.

== History ==
The event was named after Beeswing, a successful 19th-century racehorse bred in Northumberland. It was established in 1977, and for a period it held Listed status. It was promoted to Group 3 level in 1986.

The Beeswing Stakes was last run in 1999. It was replaced the following year by a similar race, the Lennox Stakes at Goodwood.

Newcastle currently stages a 7-furlong handicap race called the Beeswing Handicap.

== Records ==
Most successful horse:

- no horse won this race more than once

Leading jockey (2 wins):

- Pat Eddery – Kampala (1980), Great Commotion (1989)
- Tony Ives – Milk of the Barley (1981), Silly Steven (1982)
- Edward Hide – Beaudelaire (1983), Major Don (1984)
- Steve Cauthen – Hadeer (1986), Salse (1988)
- Willie Carson – Bold Russian (1991), Shahid (1995)
- Ray Cochrane – Casteddu (1992), Eurolink Thunder (1993)

Leading trainer (2 wins):

- Paul Cole – John de Coombe (1978), Sarab (1985)
- Richard Hannon – Silly Steven (1982), Savahra Sound (1990)
- John Dunlop – Eurolink Thunder (1993), Shahid (1995)

== Winners ==
Year	Winner	Age	Jockey	Trainer	Time
1977	In Haste	3	John Lowe	Bill Watts	1:29.87
1978	John de Coombe	3	Geoff Baxter	Paul Cole	1:27.01
1979	Jeroboam	3	Lester Piggott	Harry Wragg	1:26.43
1980	Kampala	4	Pat Eddery	Peter Walwyn	1:26.66
1981	Milk of the Barley	4	Tony Ives	Bill O'Gorman	1:28.48
1982	Silly Steven	3	Tony Ives	Richard Hannon	1:25.98
1983	Beaudelaire	3	Edward Hide	Vincent O'Brien	1:23.53
1984	Major Don	4	Edward Hide	Ernie Weymes	1:28.80
1985	Sarab	4	Richard Quinn	Paul Cole	1:29.53
1986	Hadeer	4	Steve Cauthen	Clive Brittain	1:26.64
1987	Farajullah	4	Gary Carter	Geoff Huffer	1:29.26
1988	Salse	3	Steve Cauthen	Henry Cecil	1:29.53
1989	Great Commotion	3	Pat Eddery	Alex Scott	1:24.13
1990	Savahra Sound	5	Bruce Raymond	Richard Hannon	1:27.29
1991	Bold Russian	4	Willie Carson	Barry Hills	1:23.61
1992	Casteddu	3	Ray Cochrane	Pip Payne	1:27.26
1993	Eurolink Thunder	3	Ray Cochrane	John Dunlop	1:25.93
1994	Gabr	4	Richard Hills	Robert Armstrong	1:24.20
1995	Shahid	3	Willie Carson	John Dunlop	1:25.21
1996	Iktamal	4	Willie Ryan	Ed Dunlop	1:24.88
1997	Wizard King	6	Dean McKeown	Sir Mark Prescott	1:24.16
1998	Decorated Hero	6	Gary Hind	John Gosden	1:27.83
1999	Josr Algarhoud	3	Willie Supple	Saeed bin Suroor	1:25.70

== See also ==
- Horseracing in Great Britain
- List of British flat horse races
