= Iktamal =

American-bred Thoroughbred racehorse

- Sire: Danzig Connection
- Grandsire: Danzig
- Dam: Crystal Cup
- Damsire: Nijinsky
- Sex: Stallion
- Foaled: 18 April 1992
- Country: United States
- Colour: Chestnut
- Breeder: Green Ireland Properties Ltd
- Owner: Maktoum Al Maktoum
- Trainer: Alex Scott; Ed Dunlop
- Record: 21: 7-4-0
- Earnings: £155,473

Major wins
- Chipchase Stakes (1996, disqualified); Beeswing Stakes (1996); Haydock Park Sprint Cup (1996)

Iktamal (foaled 18 April 1992) was an American-bred, British-trained Thoroughbred racehorse and sire. Owned throughout his racing career by Maktoum Al Maktoum and trained in all but one of his races by Ed Dunlop he was a sprinter who raced almost exclusively over distance of six and seven furlongs. In his first two seasons he showed useful but unremarkable form, winning two minor races and a relatively valuable handicap race as a three-year-old in 1995. In the following year he was highly tried, running eleven times and emerging as a top-class performer. He was disqualified after finishing first in the Chipchase Stakes but went on to win the Beeswing Stakes before recording his biggest success in the Group One Haydock Park Sprint Cup. In the same year he finished fourth in both the July Cup and the Prix Maurice de Gheest as well as running sixth in the Breeders' Cup Sprint. After his retirement from racing he stood as a breeding stallion in South Africa.

== Background ==
Iktamal was a big chestnut horse with a white blaze and long white socks on his front legs bred in Kentucky by Green Ireland Properties Ltd. He was one of the best horses sires by Danzig Connection who recorded his biggest win in the Belmont Stakes in 1986. Iktamal's dam Crystal Cup showed no racing ability in two starts but was exceptionally well-bred: she was a daughter of the outstanding racemare Rose Bowl, who was a half-sister to Ile de Bourbon. As a broodmare, Crystal Cup also produced First Magnitude (Prix du Conseil de Paris) and Rockamundo (Arkansas Derby).

As a yearling in October 1993 the colt was put up for auction at the Tattersalls sale and was bought for 75,000 guineas by Maktoum Al Maktoum's Gainsborough Stud. Iktamal was sent into training with Alex Scott at the Glebe House Stable near Newmarket, Suffolk.

== Racing career ==
=== 1994: two-year-old season ===
Alex Scott died after being shot by a recently dismissed member of stable staff on 30 September 1994. Iktamal made his racecourse debut a month later in a maiden race over seven furlongs at Yarmouth Racecourse. Starting at odds of 14/1 he finished ninth of the thirteen runners, twenty-three lengths behind the winner Peace Envoy.

Following Scott's death, the colt was moved to the stable of Ed Dunlop.

=== 1995: three-year-old season ===
In 1995 Iktamal was beaten in maiden races at Goodwood, Haydock Park and Thirsk before recording his first success over seven furlongs at Redcar Racecourse on 4 August when he won by a short head from the John Gosden-trained Golden Envoy. Nine days later he contested a handicap race at Pontefract and finished fourth of the thirteen runners. Iktamal then won a minor handicap race at Redcar on 23 August and weight-for-age race at Haydock Park on 1 September before winning a handicap at Goodwood eight days later under a weight of 138 pounds. On his final appearance of the season Iktamal was stepped up in class for the Listed Bentinck Stakes at Newmarket Racecourse. He was made the 7/2 favourite but finished fourth of the twelve runners behind Royal Figurine.

=== 1996: four-year-old season ===
Iktamal began his third season by finishing sixth in the Cammidge Trophy at Doncaster Racecourse on 23 March and then ran second to Passion For Life in the Abernant Stakes at Newmarket in April. On 2 May the colt started favourite for a minor race over six furlongs at Salisbury Racecourse and won by one and a quarter lengths from the eight-year-old gelding Everglades.

In the Listed Leisure Stakes at Lingfield Park Racecourse on 1 June Iktamal started favourite but was beaten a length by the three-year-old Rambling Bear (later to win the King George Stakes). Later that month he was stepped up in class for the Cork and Orrery Stakes at Royal Ascot and finished fifth of the seventeen runners behind Atraf. Nine days later Iktamal started 6/4 favourite for the Listed Chipchase Stakes at Newcastle Racecourse. After starting poorly he was "squeezed" through a gap between horses in the last quarter mile and crossed the line in first place. Following an objection and an inquiry by the racecourse stewards he was disqualified for causing interference and relegated to fifth place. Paul Eddery, who had ridden the horse in his last six races, was replaced by Richard Hills when Iktamal was moved up to Group One class for the July Cup at Newmarket. He finished fourth behind Anabaa, Lucayan Prince and Hever Golf Rose with Danehill Dancer and Pivotal in fifth and sixth. Willie Ryan took over from Hills when Iktamal contested the Beeswing Stakes over seven furlongs at Newcastle on 27 July. He started the 3/1 joint-favourite alongside the Mill Reef Stakes winner Kahir Almaydan, whilst the other seven runners included Atraf, Almushtarak (later to win the Sandown Mile) and Branston Abby (Sceptre Stakes). After being restrained in the early stages Iktamal moved up to take the lead "on the bit" inside the final furlong and won by three lengths from Dance Sequence. Two weeks after his win at Newcastle, Iktamal was sent to France for the Prix Maurice de Gheest at Deauville Racecourse in which he started a 27/1 outsider and finished fourth behind Anabaa, Miesque's Son and Danehill Dancer.

On 7 September on good ground at Haydock Park Iktamal started at odds of 10/1 in an eleven-runners field for the Group One Sprint Cup. Miesque's Son started favourite whilst the other contenders were Lucayan Prince, Hever Golf Rose, Danehill Dancer, Blue Duster, Mind Games (Temple Stakes), Royal Applause, Rambling Bear (King George Stakes), Cool Jazz (Diadem Stakes) and Catch The Blues. Ryan restrained the colt in the early stages as first Royal Applause, then Hever Golf Rose and then Blue Duster led the field. Iktamal began to make the progress in the last quarter mile, overtook Blue Duster inside the final furlong and won by a length. Sheikh Maktoum's racing manager Joe Mercer said "This horse simply thrives on racing. He just gets better and better, and Ed has done a great job with him", whilst Willy Ryan commented "This is a much better horse on fast ground. He's done it very well – I was able to settle him, and when I asked him to go he picked up in an instant".

On his final appearance, Iktamal was sent to Canada to contest the Breeders' Cup Sprint at Woodbine Racetrack on 26 October. Racing on dirt for the first time he started slowly before staying on in the straight to finish sixth behind Lit de Justice.

== Stud record ==
At the end of his racing career Iktamal was exported to become a breeding stallion at the Summerhill Stud in South Africa.

== Pedigree ==
Pedigree of Iktamal (USA), chestnut stallion, 1992
Sire Danzig Connection (USA) 1983	Danzig (USA); 1977	Northern Dancer	Nearctic
Sire Danzig Connection (USA) 1983	Danzig (USA); 1977	Northern Dancer	Natalma
Sire Danzig Connection (USA) 1983	Danzig (USA); 1977	Pas de Nom	Admirals Voyage
Sire Danzig Connection (USA) 1983	Danzig (USA); 1977	Pas de Nom	Petitioner
Sire Danzig Connection (USA) 1983	Gdynia (USA); 1978	Sir Ivor	Sir Gaylord
Sire Danzig Connection (USA) 1983	Gdynia (USA); 1978	Sir Ivor	Attica
Sire Danzig Connection (USA) 1983	Gdynia (USA); 1978	Classicist	Princequillo
Sire Danzig Connection (USA) 1983	Gdynia (USA); 1978	Classicist	Classic Music
Dam Crystal Cup (USA) 1981	Nijinsky (CAN); 1967	Northern Dancer	Nearctic
Dam Crystal Cup (USA) 1981	Nijinsky (CAN); 1967	Northern Dancer	Natalma
Dam Crystal Cup (USA) 1981	Nijinsky (CAN); 1967	Flaming Page	Bull Page
Dam Crystal Cup (USA) 1981	Nijinsky (CAN); 1967	Flaming Page	Flaring Top
Dam Crystal Cup (USA) 1981	Rose Bowl (USA); 1972	Habitat	Sir Gaylord
Dam Crystal Cup (USA) 1981	Rose Bowl (USA); 1972	Habitat	Little Hut
Dam Crystal Cup (USA) 1981	Rose Bowl (USA); 1972	Roseliere	Misti
Dam Crystal Cup (USA) 1981	Rose Bowl (USA); 1972	Roseliere	Peace Rose (Family: 4-i)

- Iktamal was inbred 3 × 3 to Northern Dancer, meaning that this stallion appears twice in the third generation of his pedigree. He was also inbred 4 × 4 to Sir Gaylord
