= Araafa =

Irish-bred Thoroughbred racehorse

- Sire: Mull of Kintyre
- Grandsire: Danzig
- Dam: Resurgence
- Damsire: Polar Falcon
- Sex: Stallion
- Foaled: 8 April 2003
- Country: Ireland
- Colour: Bay
- Breeder: Sweetmans Bloodstock
- Owner: Saleh Al Homaizi & Imad Al Sagar
- Trainer: Jeremy Noseda
- Record: 10: 3-2-1
- Earnings: £392,500

Major wins
- Irish 2,000 Guineas (2006); St James's Palace Stakes (2006)

Awards
- Top-rated British three-year-old colt (2006)

Araafa (8 April 2003 – 15 June 2012) was an Irish-bred, British-trained Thoroughbred racehorse and sire. He won three of his ten races between July 2005 and November 2006 and was the top-rated British-trained colt of his generation. As a two-year-old he won on his debut and was placed in both the Acomb Stakes and the Horris Hill Stakes. In the following spring he finished fourth to George Washington in the 2000 Guineas before reversing the form to win the Irish 2,000 Guineas. He followed up with a win in the St James's Palace Stakes and later finished second to George Washington in the Queen Elizabeth II Stakes. He was then retired to stud but was not a success as a breeding stallion. He died in 2012 at the age of nine.

== Background ==
Araafa was a dark-coated bay horse with a large white star and white sock on his left hind foot bred in Ireland by Sweetmans Bloodstock. He was from the first crop of foals sired by Mull of Kintyre, whose biggest win came in the 1999 running of the Gimcrack Stakes. Mull of Kintyre's also sired Mull of Killough who won two editions of the Earl of Sefton Stakes, but he was not considered a success as a breeding stallion and was exported to India. Araafa's dam Resurgence was a full-sister to the leading sprinter and sire Pivotal.

As a foal, Araafa was consigned by the Castletown Stud to the Tattersalls sale in November 2003 and was bought for 48,000 guineas by the bloodstock agent Paul Shanahan. The colt returned to Tattersalls in October 2004 and was sold for 150,000 guineas to Tony Nerses, acting on behalf of Saleh Al Homaizi and Imad Al Sagar. He was sent into training with Jeremy Noseda at Newmarket.

== Racing career ==
=== 2005: two-year-old season ===
Araafa made his racecourse in a seven furlong maiden race at Newmarket Racecourse on 29 July 2005. Starting a 16/1 outsider, he recovered from a slow start to win by a neck from the odds-on favourite Kilworth. He was then moved up in class to contest the Listed Acomb Stakes at York Racecourse in August and finished second to Palace Episode, a colt who went on to win the Racing Post Trophy. The colt was stepped up in class again for the Group Three Somerville Tattersall Stakes in September and finished sixth of the nine runners behind Aussie Rules. Araafa produced a better effort on his final appearance of the season, as he finished third to Hurricane Cat in the Group Three Horris Hill Stakes at Newbury Racecourse on 22 October.

=== 2006: three-year-old season ===
On his first appearance as a three-year-old, Araafa started a 66/1 outsider for the 2000 Guineas over the Rowley Mile course at Newmarket on 6 May. Ridden for the first time by Alan Munro he stayed on well in the closing stages to finish fourth of the fourteen runners behind George Washington, Sir Percy and Olympian Odyssey. Three weeks later, Araafa was sent to Ireland to contest the Irish 2000 Guineas on soft ground at the Curragh and started the 12/1 fourth choice in the betting behind George Washington (unbeaten in over a year), Decado (winner of the Tetrarch Stakes) and Hurricane Cat. Munro tracked the leaders before sending Araafa into the lead three furlongs from the finish. Araafa opened up a clear lead approaching the final furlong and won by two lengths from George Washington, with Decado a length away in third. After the race Munro said "he travelled well and took me there easily, the way he travelled and quickened you would have to think the ground suited him well".

At Royal Ascot on 20 June, Araafa, with Munro again in the saddle, started 2/1 favourite for the Group One St James's Palace Stakes. He was again opposed by Decado as well as two runners from the Aidan O'Brien stable: Ivan Denisovich (July Stakes) and Marcus Andronicus (runner-up to Aussie Rules in the Poule d'Essai des Poulains). His strongest challenger, however, appeared to be the French-trained Stormy River, the winner of the Prix Djebel and the Prix de Fontainebleau. Arrafa raced in second place before taking the lead in the straight and was never seriously challenged, winning by two lengths from Stormy River. Following the colt's victory, Noseda commented "It was a great performance. He keeps progressing, and his work has improved again since Ireland. I was just a little edgy, hoping he would show that on the race course today, and I think we saw that."

On 2 August, Araafa was matched against older horses for the first time and started 11/10 favourite for the Sussex Stakes over one mile at Goodwood Racecourse. He took the lead two furlongs out but weakened in the closing stages and finished fifth of the seven runners behind the six-year-old Court Masterpiece. Christophe Soumillon took over from Munro when the colt contested the Queen Elizabeth II Stakes at Ascot in September. After briefly taking the lead in the straight he was overtaken and beaten one and a quarter lengths into second place by George Washington, with Court Masterpiece two lengths away in third. On his final start, Araafa was sent to the United States to contest the Breeders' Cup Mile on 4 November at Churchill Downs. Ridden by John Velazquez, he was made the 11/4 favourite but after reaching third place in the straight he weakened in the final furlong and finished ninth of the fourteen runners behind Miesque's Approval.

== Assessment ==
In the 2006 World Thoroughbred Racehorse Rankings, Araafa was given a rating of 122, making him the seventeenth best racehorse in the world and the best British-trained three-year-old colt.

== Stud record ==
Araafa was retired from racing to become a breeding stallion at the Plantation Stud in Newmarket. He was not a success at stud, with the best of his offspring being Aeolus, who won the Sandy Lane Stakes in 2014. In 2012 he was transferred to the Woodlands Stud in County Galway. On 15 June 2012 Araafa died from a ruptured blood vessel in his heart shortly after covering a mare.

== Pedigree ==
Pedigree of Araafa (IRE), bay stallion, 2003
Sire Mull of Kintyre (USA) 1997	Danzig (USA); 1977	Northern Dancer	Nearctic
Sire Mull of Kintyre (USA) 1997	Danzig (USA); 1977	Northern Dancer	Natalma
Sire Mull of Kintyre (USA) 1997	Danzig (USA); 1977	Pas de Nom	Admiral's Voyage
Sire Mull of Kintyre (USA) 1997	Danzig (USA); 1977	Pas de Nom	Petitioner
Sire Mull of Kintyre (USA) 1997	Retrospective (USA); 1992	Easy Goer	Alydar
Sire Mull of Kintyre (USA) 1997	Retrospective (USA); 1992	Easy Goer	Relaxing
Sire Mull of Kintyre (USA) 1997	Retrospective (USA); 1992	Hay Patcher	Hoist the Flag
Sire Mull of Kintyre (USA) 1997	Retrospective (USA); 1992	Hay Patcher	Turn to Talent
Dam Resurgence (GB) 1998	Polar Falcon (USA); 1987	Nureyev	Northern Dancer
Dam Resurgence (GB) 1998	Polar Falcon (USA); 1987	Nureyev	Special
Dam Resurgence (GB) 1998	Polar Falcon (USA); 1987	Marie d'Argonne	Jefferson
Dam Resurgence (GB) 1998	Polar Falcon (USA); 1987	Marie d'Argonne	Mohair
Dam Resurgence (GB) 1998	Fearless Revival (GB); 1987	Cozzene	Caro
Dam Resurgence (GB) 1998	Fearless Revival (GB); 1987	Cozzene	Ride the Trails
Dam Resurgence (GB) 1998	Fearless Revival (GB); 1987	Stufida	Bustino
Dam Resurgence (GB) 1998	Fearless Revival (GB); 1987	Stufida	Zerbinetta (Family: 7)
