= Foundation Stakes =

Flat horse race in Britain

- Class: Listed
- Location: Goodwood Racecourse; Goodwood, England
- Race type: Flat / Thoroughbred
- Sponsor: Virgin Bet
- Website: Goodwood

Race information
- Distance: 1m 1f 197y (1,991 metres)
- Surface: Turf
- Track: Right-handed
- Qualification: Three-years-old and up
- Weight: 8 st 13 lb (3yo); 9 st 4 lb (4yo+); Allowances; 5 lb for fillies Penalties; 7 lb for Group 1 winners* 5 lb for Group 2 winners* 3 lb for Group 3 winners* * after 31 March
- Purse: £60,000 (2025); 1st: £34,026

Foundation Stakes
2026
Respond	Boiling Point	Naqeeb

Previous years
2025
Naqeeb	Ancient Wisdom	Saddadd
2024
Novus	Botanical	Macduff
2023
My Prospero	King Of Conquest	Rousay
2022
Royal Fleet	Rousay	Cadillac
2021
Victory Chime	Tyson Fury	West End Charmer

2020-2011
2020
Anna Nerium	High End	Desert Icon
2019
Air Pilot	Qarasu	Illumined
2018
Gabr	Plutonian	Threading
2017
Monarchs Glen	What About Carlo	Born To Be Alive
2016
Sky Hunter	Tullius	Mount Logan
2015
Battalion	Wannabe Yours	David Livingston
2014
Grandeur	Danadana	Marsh Daisy
2013
Grandeur	Quick Wit	Making Eyes
2012
Primevere	Ektihaam	Voodoo Prince
2011
Hunter's Light	Fallen Idol	Mirror Lake

2010-2001
2010
Holberg	Pink Symphony	Heliodor
2009
Twice Over	Perfect Stride	Fanjura
2008
Hearthstead Maison	Tranquil Tiger	Many Volumes
2007
Kirklees	Ordnance Row	Windsor Knot
2006
Imperial Stride	Kahlua Kiss	Championship Point
2005
Etesaal	Enforcer	Tahtheeb
2004
Alkaadhem	Privy Seal	Battle Chant
2003
Imtiyaz	Miss Corniche	Far Lane
2002
Rawyaan	Imtiyaz	Flat Spin
2001
Mont Rocher	Marhoob	Ennoblement

2000-1991
2000
Albarahin	Right Wing	Diamond White
1999
Diamond White	Prolix	Monsajem
1998
Danish Rhapsody	Chester House	Proper Blue
1997
Danish Rhapsody	Proper Blue	Sandstone
1996
Hagwah	Overbury	Fahim
1995
Revere	Nash Terrace	Ninette
1994
Luhuk	Zilzal Zamaan	Young Buster
1992
King's Loch	Delve	Marcus Thorpe
1991
Perpendicular	Opera House	Sapieha

1990-1988
1990
Noble Patriarch	Relief Pitcher	Song Of Sixpence
1989
Monastery	Ile De Nisky	Muhbubh
1988
Alwuhush	Al Mufti	Early Call

The Foundation Stakes is a Listed flat horse race in Great Britain open to horses aged three years or older. It is run at Goodwood over a distance of 1 mile, 1 furlong and 197 yards (1,991 metres), and it is scheduled to take place each year in September. In 2011 it was run under the sponsored title of the Tanqueray Stakes.

== Winners ==
Year	Winner	Age	Jockey	Trainer	Time
1986	Chinoiserie	3	Ray Cochrane	Luca Cumani	2:10.70
1987	Street Line	3	Bruce Raymond	Michael Jarvis	2:06.96
1988	Alwuhush	3	Ray Cochrane	John Dunlop	2:09.42
1989	Monastery	3	Ray Cochrane	Susan Piggott	2:11.41
1990	Noble Patriarch	3	John Reid	John Dunlop	2:13.24
1991	Perpendicular	3	Willie Ryan	Henry Cecil	2:12.43
1992	King's Loch	3	Willie Ryan	Henry Cecil	2:15.16
1993	Abandoned due to waterlogging
1994	Luhuk	3	Richard Hughes	John Dunlop	2:09.25
1995	Revere	5	Richard Quinn	Paul Cole	2:11.08
1996	Hagwah	4	Michael Roberts	Ben Hanbury	2:08.93
1997	Danish Rhapsody	4	Paul Eddery	Lady Herries	2:09.43
1998	Danish Rhapsody	5	Paul Eddery	Lady Herries	2:08.01
1999	Diamond White	4	Tim Sprake	Mick Ryan	2:16.32
2000	Albarahin	5	Richard Hills	Marcus Tregoning	2:14.10
2001	Mont Rocher	6	Kieren Fallon	John Hammond	2:07.68
2002	Rawyaan	3	Richard Hills	John Gosden	2:04.19
2003	Imtiyaz	4	Frankie Dettori	Saeed bin Suroor	2:06.06
2004	Alkaadhem	4	Richard Hills	Marcus Tregoning	2:11.62
2005	Etesaal	5	Frankie Dettori	Saeed bin Suroor	2:05.42
2006	Imperial Stride	5	Kerrin McEvoy	Saeed bin Suroor	2:05.91
2007	Kirklees	3	Frankie Dettori	Saeed bin Suroor	2:07.99
2008 (dh)	Hearthstead Maison; Tranquil Tiger	4; 4	Ryan Moore; Tom Queally	Mark Johnston; Henry Cecil	2:05.19
2009	Twice Over	4	Tom Queally	Henry Cecil	2:05.47
2010	Holberg	4	Frankie Dettori	Saeed bin Suroor	2:05.06
2011	Hunter's Light	3	Ted Durcan	Saeed bin Suroor	2:12.51
2012	Primevere	4	James Doyle	Roger Charlton	2:09.69
2013	Grandeur	4	Ryan Moore	Jeremy Noseda	2:06.60
2014	Grandeur	5	Ryan Moore	Jeremy Noseda	2:05.80
2015	Battalion	5	Pat Cosgrave	William Haggas	2:13.57
2016	Sky Hunter	6	William Buick	Saeed bin Suroor	2:07.24
2017	Monarchs Glen	3	Robert Tart	John Gosden	2:12.23
2018	Gabr	3	Jim Crowley	Michael Stoute	2:09.76
2019	Air Pilot	10	Harry Bentley	Ralph Beckett	2:16.59
2020	Anna Nerium	5	Sean Levey	Richard Hannon Jr.	2:11.90
2021	Victory Chime	6	Hector Crouch	Ralph Beckett	2:05.89
2022	Royal Fleet	4	William Buick	Charlie Appleby	2:06.86
2023	My Prospero	4	Tom Marquand	William Haggas	2:12.12
2024	Novus	4	Rhys Clutterbuck	Gary & Josh Moore	2:13.44
2025	Naqeeb	5	Ryan Sexton	Julie Camacho	2:07.71
2026	Respond	4	Oisin Murphy	Andrew Balding	2:03.84

== See also ==
- Horse racing in Great Britain
- List of British flat horse races
