= Golden Rose (disambiguation) =

A Golden Rose is a gold ornament blessed by popes of the Catholic Church.

Golden Rose may also refer to:

- Golden Rose Award, an American literary prize
- Golden Rose Bulgarian Feature Film Festival
- Golden Rose Stakes, an Australian horse race
- Golden Rose Stakes (Great Britain), a British horse race
- Golden Rose Synagogue (Lviv), in Ukraine
- Golden Rose Synagogue (Dnipro), in Ukraine
- "The Golden Rose", a song by Tom Petty from the 2006 album Highway Companion

== See also ==
- Rose d'Or, an international awards festival in entertainment broadcasting and programming
