= River Eden Fillies' Stakes =

Flat horse race in Britain

River Eden Fillies' Stakes
2025
Fairy Glen	Understudy	Favorite Memory

Previous years
2024
Sea Theme	Beeley	Meribella
2023
Safety Catch	Divine Jewel	Wynter Wildes
2022
Pennymoor	Darmoiselle	Bartzella
2021
Sea La Rosa	Pennymoor	Viola

2020-2011
2020
Sorrel	Elizabethofaragon	Domino Darling
2019
Delphinia	Hameem	Nkosikazi
2018
Dramatic Queen	Alwaysandforever	Isabella
2017
Daphne	Melodic Motion	Cribbs Causeway
2016
Bess Of Hardwick	Dogma	Anzhelika
2015
Urban Castle	California	Headline News
2014
Hidden Gold	Miss Marjurie	Alwilda
2013
Speckled	Livia's Dream	Phiz
2012
Tempest Fugit	Rumh	Aniseed
2011
Charleston Lady	Roxy Flyer	Cill Rialaig

2010-2006
2010
Baila Me	Rosika	Giants Play
2009
Baila Me	Rosika	Storyland
2008
Mischief Making	Samira Gold	Ronaldsay
2007
Loulwa	Market Forces	Guilia
2006
High Heel Sneakers	Taranto	Lake Toya

The River Eden Fillies' Stakes is a Listed flat horse race in Great Britain open to mares and fillies aged three years or over. It is run over a distance of 1 mile and 5 furlongs (2,615 metres) at Lingfield Park in late October or early November.

The race was first run in 2006.

== Records ==
Most successful horse (2 wins):

- Baila Me – 2009, 2010

Leading jockey (2 wins):

- Frankie Dettori – Baila Me (2009, 2010)
- Jim Crowley - Charleston Lady (2011), Daphne (2017)
- James Doyle - Dramatic Queen (2018), Pennymoor (2022)

Leading trainer (5 wins):

- William Haggas – Daphne (2017), Dramatic Queen (2018), Sea La Rosa (2021), Safety Catch (2023), Sea Theme (2024)

== Winners ==
Year	Winner	Age	Jockey	Trainer	Time
2006	High Heel Sneakers	3	Ryan Moore	Paul Cole	2:44.48
2007	Loulwa	3	Seb Sanders	Jeremy Noseda	2:44.04
2008	Mischief Making	3	T G McLaughlin	Ed Dunlop	2:41.08
2009	Baila Me	4	Frankie Dettori	Saeed bin Suroor	2:41.72
2010	Baila Me	5	Frankie Dettori	Saeed bin Suroor	2:42.42
2011	Charleston Lady	3	Jim Crowley	Ralph Beckett	2:42.30
2012	Tempest Fugit	3	Nicky Mackay	John Gosden	2:41.30
2013	Speckled	3	Silvestre de Sousa	Charlie Appleby	2:44.03
2014	Hidden Gold	3	Frederik Tylicki	Saeed bin Suroor	2:39.70
2015	Urban Castle	4	Adam Kirby	James Tate	2:40.70
2016	Bess Of Hardwick	4	Andrea Atzeni	Luca Cumani	2:45.03
2017	Daphne	4	Jim Crowley	William Haggas	2:40.70
2018	Dramatic Queen	3	James Doyle	William Haggas	2:40.94
2019	Delphinia	3	Seamie Heffernan	Aidan O'Brien	2:43.29
2020	Sorrel	3	William Buick	Sir Michael Stoute	2:40.94
2021	Sea La Rosa	3	Tom Marquand	William Haggas	2:41.68
2022	Pennymoor	4	James Doyle	John & Thady Gosden	2:44.39
2023	Safety Catch	3	Cieren Fallon	William Haggas	2:40.53
2024	Sea Theme	4	Billy Loughnane	William Haggas	2:45.20
2025	Fairy Glen	4	Harry Davies	Simon & Ed Crisford	2:46.09
2026	Little Dorrit	4	Callum Rodriguez	Roger Varian	2:46.19

== See also ==
- Horse racing in Great Britain
- List of British flat horse races
