= Sheikh Albadou =

British-bred Thoroughbred racehorse

- Sire: Green Desert
- Grandsire: Danzig
- Dam: Sanctuary
- Damsire: Welsh Pageant
- Sex: Stallion
- Foaled: 15 April 1988
- Country: United Kingdom
- Colour: Bay
- Breeder: Highclere Stud
- Owner: Hilal Salem
- Trainer: Alex Scott
- Record: 15: 6-4-1
- Earnings: £661,983

Major wins
- Nunthorpe Stakes (1991); Breeders' Cup Sprint (1991); King's Stand Stakes (1992); Haydock Sprint Cup (1992)

Awards
- European Champion Sprinter (1991)
- Last updated on December 27, 2006

Sheikh Albadou (15 April 1988 – 1999), was a Thoroughbred racehorse and sire who was bred and trained in the United Kingdom. In a racing career which lasted from October 1990 until October 1992 he ran fifteen times and won six races. Sheikh Albadou won several major European sprint races including the Nunthorpe Stakes, the King's Stand Stakes and the Haydock Sprint Cup, but is best known for being the only European-trained winner of the Breeders' Cup Sprint. He was named European Champion Sprinter in 1991. At the end of his racing career Sheikh Albadou was retired to stud but made little impression as a sire of winners.

== Background ==
Sheikh Albadou, a bay horse with a narrow white blaze was bred in England at the Highclere Stud, Berkshire. He was sired by Green Desert out of the Welsh Pageant mare Sanctuary. Green Desert finished second to Dancing Brave in the 2000 Guineas and became a leading sprinter, winning the July Cup. Apart from Sheikh Albadou, he sired the winners of over 1,000 races, including Desert Prince, Oasis Dream and Cape Cross, the sire of Sea the Stars. Sanctuary never raced but came from a good staying family, being a half sister to Little Wolf (Ascot Gold Cup) and Smuggler (Yorkshire Cup).

Sheikh Albadou was sent into training with Alex Scott at Newmarket, Suffolk.

== Racing career ==
=== 1990: two-year-old season ===
Sheikh Albadou made one start as a two-year-old, contesting a maiden race at Newmarket. He started slowly and made no impression in the race, finishing eighth of the eleven starters.

=== 1991: three-year-old season ===
Sheikh Albadou won his first race on his 1991 reappearance, leading a furlong out and pulling clear to win a Pontefract maiden race "very easily" by seven lengths. He was narrowly beaten in a seven furlong handicap, but when brought back to sprint distances he won a valuable handicap at York by four lengths. In late June he was again tried over seven furlongs, finishing fourth in the Group Three Criterion Stakes at Newmarket, before being switched exclusively to sprinting.

In the Group One Nunthorpe Stakes Sheikh Albadou was made 6/1 third favourite behind the French-trained Divine Danse and the King's Stand Stakes winner Elbio. Pat Eddery tracked the two-year-old Paris House before taking the lead inside the final furlong and winning by one and a half lengths. Sheikh Albadou then took second place in two more Group one sprints, the Sprint Cup at Haydock, and the Prix de l'Abbaye at Longchamp, before being sent to Churchill Downs for the Breeders' Cup Sprint.

==== Breeders' Cup Sprint ====
Scott had prepared the Sheikh Albadou by training him on synthetic surfaces and had been convinced to run by the times the colt had recorded. Another point in his favour was that he was set to carry considerably less weight than he had been doing in Europe. Although the British-trained Dayjur had narrowly failed to win the race in 1990 after jumping his shadow, European sprinters were not highly regarded, and Sheikh Albadou was given little chance against the Eclipse Award winner Housebuster, starting at odds of 26/1. Media Plan led the race and ran the opening quarter mile in 21 seconds, with Sheikh Albadou settled by Eddery in the middle of the field. Entering the straight, Housebuster challenged Media Plan for the lead, but Sheikh Albadou was traveling easily in fourth. Eddery sent the colt into the lead a furlong out and as Housebuster faded, having suffered an injury, Sheikh Albadou pulled away to win by an easy three lengths from the fast-finishing Pleasant Tap.

=== 1992: four-year-old season ===
After his win in America, Sheikh Albadou was off the racecourse for seven months, finally returning at Royal Ascot for the King's Stand Stakes. Ridden by Walter Swinburn, He was held up in the early stages before quickening to lead a furlong out and winning in a tight finish from Mr Brooks and Elbio.

Sheikh Albadou was made favourite for the July Cup, in which he was matched against the season's other leading sprinter Shalford. Swinburn employed the same tactics as at Ascot, but Sheikh Albadou was overtaken in the closing stages and finished third, beaten a head and a neck by Mr Brooks and Pursuit of Love. In his next race he was tried over a mile, but finished only fourth in the Sussex Stakes behind Marling.

Sheikh Albadou returned to sprinting and a third meeting with Mr Brooks in the Haydock Sprint Cup. He produced what was probably his best performance in Europe, taking the lead a furlong out and pulling clear for an "impressive" two and a half length win.

Sheikh Albadou returned to America for his final two starts in October. At Belmont Park he finished three quarters of a length second to Rubiano in the Vosburgh Stakes before moving to Florida for the Breeders' Cup Sprint. Confidence in his challenge was reported to be high in what was to be his final race, although there was some discussion about the decision to run the colt on bute. He started at 3/1 but could never reach the lead, finishing fourth behind Thirty Slews.

== Race record ==
Date	Race	Dist (f)	Course	Class	Prize (£K)	Odds	Runners	Placing	Margin	Time	Jockey	Trainer
19 October 1990	EBF Snailwell Maiden	6	Newmarket Rowley	M	4	11/2	11	8	7	1:15.79	Pat Eddery	Alex Scott
29 April 1991	Levy Board Maiden Stakes	6	Pontefract	M	3	13/8	10	1	7	1:16.50	Bruce Raymond	Alex Scott
16 May 1991	Norwest Holst Trophy	7	York	H	19	11/4	11	2	Short head	1:24.93	Pat Eddery	Alex Scott
15 June 1991	William Hill Golden Spurs Trophy	6	York	H	24	9/4	15	1	4	1:11.97	Pat Eddery	Alex Scott
29 June 1991	Criterion Stakes	7	Newmarket July	3	25	6/4	12	4	2.75	1:25.89	Pat Eddery	Alex Scott
22 August 1991	Nunthorpe Stakes	5	York	1	89	6/1	9	1	1.5	0:58.21	Pat Eddery	Alex Scott
7 September 1991	Haydock Sprint Cup	6	Haydock	1	85	9/4	6	2	1.5	1:11.23	Bruce Raymond	Alex Scott
6 October 1991	Prix de l'Abbaye de Longchamp	5	Longchamp	1	71	3/1	14	2	1	0:59.40	Bruce Raymond	Alex Scott
2 November 1991	Breeders' Cup Sprint	6	Churchill Downs	1	269	26/1	11	1	3	1:09.20	Pat Eddery	Alex Scott
19 June 1992	King's Stand Stakes	5	Ascot	2	59	7/2	10	1	0.5	1:00.50	Walter Swinburn	Alex Scott
9 July 1992	July Cup	6	Newmarket July	1	92	15/8	8	3	0.5	1:11.80	Walter Swinburn	Alex Scott
29 July 1992	Sussex Stakes	8	Goodwood	1	76	11/1	8	4	3	1:36.68	Walter Swinburn	Alex Scott
5 September 1992	Haydock Sprint Cup	6	Haydock	1	72	9/4	8	1	2.5	1:14.71	Bruce Raymond	Alex Scott
3 October 1992	Vosburgh Stakes	7	Belmont Park	1	63		4	2	0.75	1:22.80	Walter Swinburn	Alex Scott
31 October 1992	Breeders' Cup Sprint	6	Gulfstream Park	1	276	3/1	14	4	3.25	1:08.20	Walter Swinburn	Alex Scott

.

== Assessment ==
Sheikh Albadou remains the only European horse to win the Breeders' Cup Sprint: in fact no subsequent European runner has bettered the fourth place he achieved in 1992.

In the Cartier Racing Awards for 1991, Sheikh Albadou was named European Champion Sprinter.

== Stud career ==
Sheikh Albadou was originally based as a stallion at the Gainsborough Stud at Versailles, Kentucky, but was later bought by the Emirates Park Stud. It was intended that he would be a shuttle stallion, standing at the Kirtlington Stud in Oxfordshire, before moving to Australia for the Southern Haemisphere breeding season. During his first season in England however, he suffered a heart attack while covering a mare and died in May 1999. His stud fee was £3,000 in his final season.

Sheikh Albadou was not a great success as a stallion, but he produced over 100 winners, the best known being the Stewards' Cup winner, Tayseer.

== Pedigree ==
Pedigree of Sheikh Albadou (GB), bay stallion, 1988
Sire Green Desert (USA) 1983	Danzig; 1977	Northern Dancer	Nearctic
Sire Green Desert (USA) 1983	Danzig; 1977	Northern Dancer	Natalma
Sire Green Desert (USA) 1983	Danzig; 1977	Pas de Nom	Admirals Voyage
Sire Green Desert (USA) 1983	Danzig; 1977	Pas de Nom	Petitioner
Sire Green Desert (USA) 1983	Foreign Courier; 1979	Sir Ivor	Sir Gaylord
Sire Green Desert (USA) 1983	Foreign Courier; 1979	Sir Ivor	Attica
Sire Green Desert (USA) 1983	Foreign Courier; 1979	Courtly Dee	Never Bend
Sire Green Desert (USA) 1983	Foreign Courier; 1979	Courtly Dee	Tulle
Dam Sanctuary (GB) 1979	Welsh Pageant; 1966	Tudor Melody	Tudor Minstrel
Dam Sanctuary (GB) 1979	Welsh Pageant; 1966	Tudor Melody	Matelda
Dam Sanctuary (GB) 1979	Welsh Pageant; 1966	Picture Light	Court Martial
Dam Sanctuary (GB) 1979	Welsh Pageant; 1966	Picture Light	Queen of Light
Dam Sanctuary (GB) 1979	Hiding Place; 1963	Doutelle	Prince Chevalier
Dam Sanctuary (GB) 1979	Hiding Place; 1963	Doutelle	Above Board
Dam Sanctuary (GB) 1979	Hiding Place; 1963	Jojo	Vilmorin
Dam Sanctuary (GB) 1979	Hiding Place; 1963	Jojo	Fairy Jane(Family:19-c)
