= Decorated Knight =

British-bred Thoroughbred racehorse

- Sire: Galileo
- Grandsire: Sadler's Wells
- Dam: Pearling
- Damsire: Storm Cat
- Sex: Stallion
- Foaled: 11 February 2012
- Country: United Kingdom
- Colour: Chestnut
- Breeder: Saleh Al Homaizi & Imad Al Sagar
- Owner: Saleh Al Homaizi & Imad Al Sagar
- Trainer: Roger Varian; Roger Charlton
- Record: 19: 8-4-1
- Earnings: £1,326,618

Major wins
- Festival Stakes (2016); Meld Stakes (2016); Winter Derby Trial (2017); Jebel Hatta (2017); Tattersalls Gold Cup (2017); Irish Champion Stakes (2017)

Decorated Knight (foaled 11 February 2012) is a British Thoroughbred racehorse and sire. After finishing second in his only start as a two-year-old he won two minor races in the following year as well as running third in the Group 2 Darley Stakes. He improved as a four-year-old in 2016 winning the Festival Stakes and the Meld Stakes as well as finishing a close second in the Diomed Stakes. He emerged as performer of the highest class in 2017 when he took the Winter Derby Trial before recording Group 1 wins in the Jebel Hatta, Tattersalls Gold Cup and Irish Champion Stakes.

== Background ==
Decorated Knight is a chestnut horse with a white blaze and white socks on his hind legs bred and owned by Saleh Al Homaizi & Imad Al Sagar of the Newmarket-based Blue Diamond Stud. He was initially sent into training with Roger Varian at the Kremlin House stable in Newmarket.

He was sired by Galileo, who won the Derby, Irish Derby and King George VI and Queen Elizabeth Stakes in 2001. Galileo became one of the world's leading stallions, earning his tenth champion sire of Great Britain and Ireland title in 2018. His other progeny include Cape Blanco, Frankel, Golden Lilac, Nathaniel, New Approach, Rip Van Winkle, Found, Minding and Ruler of the World.

Decorated Knight's dam Pearling showed little racing ability, failing to win in two starts but as a daughter of Storm Cat and the broodmare Mariah's Storm was a full-sister to both Giant's Causeway and to You'resothrilling, the dam of Gleneagles, Happily and Marvellous. As a five-year-old in December 2011, with the future Decorated Knight in utero, Pearling was put up for auction at Tattersalls and was bought for 1.3 million guineas by Tony Nerses on behalf of the Blue Diamond Stud.

== Racing career ==
=== 2014: two-year-old season ===
Decorated Knight made his first and only start as a two-year-old in a maiden race over one mile at Doncaster Racecourse on 11 September and started at odds of 11/2 in a seventeen-runner field. Ridden by Andrea Atzeni, who became his regular jockey, he kept on well in the final furlong to finish second, a length behind the winner Commemorative.

=== 2015: three-year-old season ===
On his three-year-old debut Decorated Knight started favourite for a ten-furlong maiden at Ripon Racecourse in April but after leading for most of the way he was overtaken in the closing stages and beaten by the 33/1 outsider Salieri's Massachusetts On 3 July the colt mas made 1/2 favourite for a four-runner maiden over one mile on good to soft ground at Haydock Park. Ridden as on his previous start by Graham Lee he overcame an obstructed run in the straight to win "cosily" by a length and a quarter from the filly Ella's Honour. Later that month he was assigned top weight of 133 pounds for a handicap race at Sandown Park in which he was ridden by Atzeni and won "readily" from six opponents at odds of 5/4. In autumn, Decorated Knight returned for two events at Newmarket Racecourse which saw him stepped up in class. On 25 September he finished third of the four runners in the Group 2 Joel Stakes, beaten five and a half lengths by the winner Time Test. Two weeks later he came home fourth behind the Brazilian gelding Energia Davos in the Group 3 Darley Stakes over nine furlongs.

=== 2016: four-year-old season ===
Before the start of the 2016 season Decorated Knight moved to the stable of Roger Charlton at Beckhampton in Wiltshire although Atzeni maintained his position as regular jockey. On his first run for his new trainer the colt started at 7/1 for the Listed Paradise Stakes over the straight mile course at Ascot Racecourse in April and finished fourth behind GM Hopkins, Battle of Marathon and Arod. On 21 May Decorated Knight was moved up to ten furlongs for the Festival Stakes at Goodwood Racecourse and started the 4/1 co-favourite alongside Berkshire (Royal Lodge Stakes) and Master Carpenter (John Smith's Cup). After tracking the leaders he took the lead a furlong out and won by half a length from Educate despite hanging right in the final strides.

When moved back up to Group 3 class for the Diomed Stakes at Epsom Racecourse two weeks later he was restrained by Atzeni towards the rear before producing a strong late run. He gained the lead from Custom Cut in the final strides but was caught on the line by Tullius and was beaten a short head in a three-way photo finish. On 14 July Decorated Knight was sent to Ireland for the Group 3 Meld Stakes over nine furlongs at Leopardstown Racecourse in which he was partnered by George Baker and went off the 9/4 second favourite behind the Royal Hunt Cup winner Portage. He raced towards the rear of the seven-runner field before making rapid progress in the straight and after taking the lead a furlong out he drew away to win "comfortably" by two lengths from Portage.

=== 2017: five-year-old season ===
Decorated Knight began his fourth campaign on the synthetic Polytrack surface at Lingfield Park in February when he started the 9/2 fourth choice in an eight-runner field for the Listed Winter Derby Trial. His more fancied opponents were Arab Spring (John Porter Stakes), Battalion (Churchill Stakes) and Grendisar (2016 Winter Derby). After racing close behind the leaders Decorated Knight moved up to challenge for the lead approaching the final furlong and got the better of a struggle with Arab Spring to win by a short head. The horse was then sent to the United Arab Emirates to contest the Group 1 Jebel Hatta over 1800 metres on turf at Meydan Racecourse on 4 March. He was made the 2/1 favourite in a twelve-runner field which included Muffri'Ha (2016 Darley Stakes), Ertijaal (Cape Derby), Promising Run (Al Rashidiya) and Earnshaw (Prix Thomas Bryon). After racing in mid-division, Decorated Knight produced a sustained run in the straight, caught the front-running Folkswood in the final strides and won by a neck. Three weeks later over the same course and distance, the horse started 15/2 third favourite for the Dubai Turf but never looked like winning and came home sixth of the thirteen runners behind the Japanese filly Vivlos.

On his return to Europe Decorated Knight was sent to Ireland and started 7/2 favourite for the Group 1 Tattersalls Gold Cup over ten and a half furlongs at the Curragh on 28 May. His seven opponents included Deauville (Belmont Derby), Somehow (Dahlia Stakes), Success Days (Royal Whip Stakes), Johannes Vermeer (Critérium International) and Moonlight Magic (Meld Stakes). He raced just behind the leaders as Success Days set the pace before taking the lead a furlong out. He stayed on strongly in the closing stages and won by one and a quarter lengths from Somehow with a gap of two and a quarter lengths back to Deauville in third. Atzeni commented "It went very smoothly. We had a good position all the way and he travelled beautifully into the race. I was very confident it was going take a decent horse to beat him today. He got to the front easily enough. In the last 100 yards he got a bit lonely, but when the second horse came he went again. He's very brave, he's got a big heart and he's going the right way".

On 21 June at Royal Ascot Decorated Knight contested the Prince of Wales's Stakes and went off at odds of 10/1 in an eight-runner field. He ran his usual race, tracking the leaders before making steady progress in the straight to finish second to Highland Reel with Ulysses in third. In the Eclipse Stakes at Sandown Park 17 days later he briefly took the lead in the straight but was quickly overtaken and faded to come home sixth behind Ulysses. In August he started a 16/1 outsider for the International Stakes at York Racecourse and finished fifth behind Ulysses, Churchill, Barney Roy and Cliffs of Moher. On 9 September ran for the second time in Ireland and started at odds of 25/1 for the Irish Champion Stakes over ten furlongs at Leopardstown Racecourse. Churchill started favourite while the other eight runners included Eminent (Prix Guillaume d'Ornano), Cliffs of Moher, Zhukova (Man o' War Stakes), Poet's Word, Moonlight Magic, The Grey Gatsby and Success Days. Decorated Knight was restrained at the rear of the field and was still last of the twelve runners entering the straight but then produced a strong run on the outside, gained the advantage inside the final furlong and won by half a length from Poet's Word. Charlton commented "He's tough, consistent, and very sound. He produced an amazing turn of foot and ran right to the line... He's been a bit unlucky in his last couple of races. He hated the ground at York, got bashed about at Sandown in the Eclipse, and ran a great race at Royal Ascot. He's been on the go since March, and he's improved and improved. To keep going all season is a tribute to the horse".

For his final racecourse appearance, Decorated Knight was sent to the United States for the Breeders' Cup Turf at Del Mar Racetrack on 4 November. Racing over a distance of one and a half miles for the first time he finished tenth of the twelve runners, just over seven lengths behind the winner Talismanic.

In the 2017 World's Best Racehorse Rankings Decorated Knight was given a rating of 120, making him the 40th best racehorse in the world.

== Stud record ==
Decorated Knight was retired from racing to become a breeding stallion at the Irish National Stud.

== Pedigree ==
Pedigree of Decorated Knight (IRE), chestnut colt, 2013
Sire Galileo (IRE) 1998	Sadler's Wells (USA); 1981	Northern Dancer (CAN)	Nearctic
Sire Galileo (IRE) 1998	Sadler's Wells (USA); 1981	Northern Dancer (CAN)	Natalma (USA)
Sire Galileo (IRE) 1998	Sadler's Wells (USA); 1981	Fairy Bridge	Bold Reason
Sire Galileo (IRE) 1998	Sadler's Wells (USA); 1981	Fairy Bridge	Special
Sire Galileo (IRE) 1998	Urban Sea (USA) ch. 1989	Miswaki	Mr. Prospector
Sire Galileo (IRE) 1998	Urban Sea (USA) ch. 1989	Miswaki	Hopespringseternal
Sire Galileo (IRE) 1998	Urban Sea (USA) ch. 1989	Allegretta (GB)	Lombard (GER)
Sire Galileo (IRE) 1998	Urban Sea (USA) ch. 1989	Allegretta (GB)	Anatevka (GER)
Dam Pearling (USA) 2006	Storm Cat (USA); 1983	Storm Bird (CAN)	Northern Dancer
Dam Pearling (USA) 2006	Storm Cat (USA); 1983	Storm Bird (CAN)	South Ocean
Dam Pearling (USA) 2006	Storm Cat (USA); 1983	Terlingua	Secretariat
Dam Pearling (USA) 2006	Storm Cat (USA); 1983	Terlingua	Crimson Saint
Dam Pearling (USA) 2006	Mariah's Storm (USA); 1991	Rahy	Blushing Groom (FR)
Dam Pearling (USA) 2006	Mariah's Storm (USA); 1991	Rahy	Glorious Song (CAN)
Dam Pearling (USA) 2006	Mariah's Storm (USA); 1991	Immense	Roberto
Dam Pearling (USA) 2006	Mariah's Storm (USA); 1991	Immense	Imsodear (Family 11)

- Decorated Knight was inbred 3 × 4 to Northern Dancer, meaning that this stallion appears in both the third and fourth generations of his pedigree.
