= Danzig Connection =

American-bred Thoroughbred racehorse

- Sire: Danzig
- Grandsire: Northern Dancer
- Dam: Gdynia
- Damsire: Sir Ivor
- Sex: Stallion
- Foaled: April 6, 1983
- Country: United States
- Colour: Bay
- Breeder: Kennelot Stables
- Owner: Henryk de Kwiatkowski
- Trainer: Woody Stephens
- Record: 17: 6-5-4
- Earnings: $1,002,620

Major wins
- Peter Pan Stakes (1986); Pegasus Stakes (1986) Triple Crown race wins: Belmont Stakes (1986)
- Last updated on May 15, 2007

Danzig Connection (April 6, 1983 – December 1, 2010) was an American Thoroughbred racehorse best known for winning the Belmont Stakes.

== Background ==
Owned and bred by Henryk de Kwiatkowski under his Kennelot Stables banner, Danzig Connection was sired by Kwaitkowski's champion, Danzig. His dam Gdynia (sired by Sir Ivor) was a moderate racehorse but a good broodmare who also produced the Dwyer Stakes winner Roi Danzig. She was a distant female-line descendant of La France, an American broodmare who was the ancestor of dam of Phalanx, Johnstown and Decidedly.

He was trained by Hall of Fame trainer Woody Stephens,

== Racing career ==
Danzig Connection raced at age two in 1985. At the Meadowlands Racetrack in East Rutherford, New Jersey, he defeated Storm Cat to capture the World Appeal Stakes. The two colts then reversed positions in the Meadowlands' Young America Stakes.

As a three-year-old, in May 1986 Danzig Connection won the Peter Pan Stakes at Belmont Park under jockey Pat Day. The biggest win of his career came under jockey Chris McCarron when he won the 1986 Belmont Stakes, defeating Ferdinand and giving trainer Stephens his record fifth straight Belmont victory. From there, the colt went on to finish fourth in the Suburban Handicap. He was third to winner Wise Times in the Haskell Invitational Handicap at Monmouth Park and second to him in the Travers Stakes at Saratoga Race Course. At the Meadowlands, he won September's Pegasus Stakes over Broad Brush and Ogygian. Finally, in the Jockey Club Gold Cup, his career finale, Danzig Connection was third to the winner Creme Fraiche, also trained by Woody Stephens.

== Stud record ==
Retired to stud, his progeny met with limited success and in 2003 he was sent to stand at a breeding operation in Italy. His offspring included Iktamal. He died in Sicily on December 1, 2010.

== Pedigree ==
Pedigree of Danzig Connection (USA), bay stallion, 1983
Sire Danzig (USA) 1977	Northern Dancer (CAN); 1961	Nearctic	Nearco
Sire Danzig (USA) 1977	Northern Dancer (CAN); 1961	Nearctic	Lady Angela
Sire Danzig (USA) 1977	Northern Dancer (CAN); 1961	Natalma	Native Dancer
Sire Danzig (USA) 1977	Northern Dancer (CAN); 1961	Natalma	Almahmoud
Sire Danzig (USA) 1977	Pas de Nom (USA); 1968	Admiral's Voyage	Crafty Admiral
Sire Danzig (USA) 1977	Pas de Nom (USA); 1968	Admiral's Voyage	Olympia Lou
Sire Danzig (USA) 1977	Pas de Nom (USA); 1968	Petitioner (GB)	Petition
Sire Danzig (USA) 1977	Pas de Nom (USA); 1968	Petitioner (GB)	Steady Aim
Dam Gdynia (USA) 1978	Sir Ivor (USA); 1965	Sir Gaylord	Turn-To
Dam Gdynia (USA) 1978	Sir Ivor (USA); 1965	Sir Gaylord	Somethingroyal
Dam Gdynia (USA) 1978	Sir Ivor (USA); 1965	Attica	Mr Trouble
Dam Gdynia (USA) 1978	Sir Ivor (USA); 1965	Attica	Athenia
Dam Gdynia (USA) 1978	Classicist (USA); 1965	Princequillo (IRE)	Prince Rose
Dam Gdynia (USA) 1978	Classicist (USA); 1965	Princequillo (IRE)	Cosquilla
Dam Gdynia (USA) 1978	Classicist (USA); 1965	Classic Music	Stymie
Dam Gdynia (USA) 1978	Classicist (USA); 1965	Classic Music	Jaconda (Family: 17-b)
