= Conqueror Stakes =

Flat horse race in Britain

- Class: Listed
- Location: Goodwood Racecourse; W. Sussex, England
- Inaugurated: 1997
- Race type: Flat
- Sponsor: racingclub.com
- Website: Goodwood

Race information
- Distance: 1 mile (1,609 metres)
- Surface: Turf
- Track: Right-handed
- Qualification: Three-years-old and up fillies and mares (excl Group 1 winners since 31 August 2024)
- Weight: 8 st 8 lb (3yo); 9 st 7 lb (4yo+); Penalties; 7 lb for Group 2 winners * 5 lb for Group 3 winners * 3 lb for Listed winners * * after 31 August 2024
- Purse: £60,000 (2025); 1st: £34,026

Conqueror Stakes
2026
Blue Bolt	Kon Tiki	Shes Perfect

Previous years
2025
Crimson Advocate	Betty Clover	Bright Thunder
2024
Royal Dress	Novus	Breege
2023
Roman Mist	Zellie	Araminta
2022
Mrs Fitzherbert	Bashkirova	Zanbaq
2021
Illykato	Agincourt	Lilac Road

2020-2011
2019
Awesometank	Anna Nerium	Vivianite
2018
Nyaleti	Shenanigans	Lincoln Rocks
2017
Laugh Aloud	Intimation	Desert Haze
2016
Blond Me	Oakley Girl	Black Cherry
2015
Don't Be	Crowley's Law	Provenance
2014
Be My Gal	Princess Loulou	Zibelina
2013
Burke's Rock	Sentaril	Oojooba
2012
Boastful	Winter's Night	Raasekha
2011
Seta	Anna Salai	Off Chance

2010-2001
2010
Shamwari Lodge	Hafawa	Super Sleuth
2009
Eva's Request	Lady Francesca	Born Tobouggie
2008
Enforce	Lady Gloria	Sweet Lilly
2007
Harvest Queen	Expensive	Laurentina
2006
Nantyglo	Sweet Treat	Salamanca
2005
Aldora	Secret History	Majestic Desert
2004
Gonfilia	Classical Dancer	Incheni
2003
Aldora	Welsh Diva	Fantasize
2002
Dolores	Lady Lindsay	Zuleika Dobson
2001
Sheppard's Watch	Monnavanna	Quick To Please

2000-1997
2000
Corinium	Eurolink Raindance	Last Resort
1999
Hawriyah	Balisada	Risque Lady
1998
Digitalize	Shuhrah	Much Commended
1997
Out West	Lilli Claire	Miss Riviera

The Conqueror Stakes is a Listed flat horse race in Great Britain open to fillies and mares aged three years or older. It is run at Goodwood over a distance of 1 mile (1,609 metres), and it is scheduled to take place each year in late April or early May.

The race was first run in 1997.

== Records ==
Most successful horse (2 wins):

- Aldora - 2003, 2005

Leading jockey (3 wins):

- Richard Quinn - Corinium (2000), Dolores (2002), Nantyglo (2006)

Leading trainer (3 wins):

- Sir Henry Cecil - Out West (1997), Digitalize (1998), Corinium (2000)

== Winners ==
Year	Winner	Age	Jockey	Trainer	Time
1997	Out West	3	Tony McGlone	Henry Cecil	1:40.92
1998	Digitalize	3	Jimmy Quinn	Henry Cecil	1:38.11
1999	Hawriyah	3	Richard Hills	John Dunlop	1:40.05
2000	Corinium	3	Richard Quinn	Henry Cecil	1:44.54
2001	Sheppard's Watch	3	Martin Dwyer	Marcus Tregoning	1:37.81
2002	Dolores	3	Richard Quinn	Amanda Perrett	1:41.48
2003	Aldora	4	Martin Dwyer	Mick Ryan	1:39.60
2004	Gonfilia	4	Kerrin McEvoy	Saeed bin Suroor	1:39.06
2005	Aldora	6	Ian Mongan	Mick Ryan	1:44.45
2006	Nantyglo	3	Richard Quinn	Michael Bell	1:40.46
2007	Harvest Queen	4	Seb Sanders	Peter Makin	1:38.79
2008	Enforce	5	William Buick	Lucy Wadham	1:41.91
2009	Eva's Request	4	Eddie Creighton	Mick Channon	1:38.76
2010	Shamwari Lodge	4	Pat Dobbs	Richard Hannon Sr.	1:40.80
2011	Seta	4	Jean-Pierre Guillambert	Luca Cumani	1:37.35
2012	Boastful	4	Neil Callan	Elaine Burke	1:45.49
2013	Burke's Rock	4	Mickael Barzalona	Jeremy Noseda	1:40.80
2014	Be My Gal	3	Hayley Turner	Roger Charlton	1:43.15
2015	Don't Be	5	Chris Catlin	Sir Mark Prescott	1:37.85
2016	Blond Me	4	David Probert	Andrew Balding	1:39.34
2017	Laugh Aloud	4	Jimmy Fortune	John Gosden	1:36.28
2018	Nyaleti	3	Joe Fanning	Mark Johnston	1:44.40
2019	Awesometank	4	Pat Dobbs	William Haggas	1:37.88
2020	no race (Note: The 2020 running was cancelled due to the COVID-19 pandemic in the United Kingdom)
2021	Illykato	3	Edward Greatrex	Mick Channon	1:38.67
2022	Mrs Fitzherbert	4	George Rooke	Hughie Morrison	1:39.20
2023	Roman Mist	5	Hollie Doyle	Archie Watson	1:49.71
2024	Royal Dress	4	Ben Coen	James Tate	1:44.39
2025	Crimson Advocate	4	Robert Havlin	John & Thady Gosden	1:37.34
2026	Blue Bolt	4	Colin Keane	Andrew Balding	1:39.27

== See also ==
- Horse racing in Great Britain
- List of British flat horse races
