= Queensferry Stakes =

Queensferry Stakes
2024
Quinault	Al Shabab Storm	Funny Story

Previous years
2023
Mitbaahy	Fast Response	Ehraz
2022
Ebro River	Princess Shabnam	Ventura Diamond
2021
Judicial	Dakota Gold	Zoetic

2020-2011
2020
Judicial	Major Jumbo	Emaraaty Ana
2019
Major Jumbo	Rock On Baileys	Miss Celestial
2018
Kimberella	Major Jumbo	Rajar
2017
Kimberella	Judicial	Unabated
2016
Hillbilly Boy	Danzeno	Eastern Impact
2015
Eastern Impact	Canny Kool	Wet Sail
2014
Intransigent	Coulsty	Ertijaal
2013
Hitchens	Intransigent	Ballista
2012
Van Ellis	Night Carnation	Hitchens
2011
Rock Jock	Rose Blossom	Star Rover

2010-2001
2010
Masamah	Quest For Success	Star Rover
2009
Doncaster Rover	Sohraab	City Dancer
2008
Green Manalishi	Damika	Reverence
2007
Green Manalishi	Baltic King	Invincible Force
2006
The Kiddykid	Beckermet	Indian Maiden
2005
Indian Maiden	Eisteddfod	Fayr Jag
2004
Rum Shot	Talbot Avenue	Nights Cross
2003
Resplendent Cee	Vita Spericolata	Proud Boast
2002
Vita Spericolata	Smokin Beau	Damalis
2001
Vita Spericolata	Damalis	Tedburrow

2000-1998
2000
Yorkies Boy	Selking	Damalis
1999
Tedburrow	Nigrasine	Classy Cleo
1998
Likely Story	Demolition Jo	Nomore Mr Niceguy

The Queensferry Stakes is a Listed flat horse race in Great Britain which from 2026 is restricted to horses aged three years. In previous years it was open to horses three years and older. It is run at Chester over a distance of 6 furlongs and 17 yards (1,223 metres), and it is scheduled to take place each year in late July or early August.

The race was first run in 1998.

== Records ==
Most successful horse (2 wins):

- Vita Spericolata - 2001, 2002
- Green Manalishi - 2007, 2008
- Kimberella - 2017, 2018
- Judicial - 2020, 2021

Leading jockey (4 wins):

- Paul Hanagan – Green Manalishi (2008), Masamah (2010), Kimberella (2017, 2018)

Leading trainer (4 wins):

- Kevin Ryan – Green Manalishi (2007, 2008), Masamah (2010), Major Jumbo (2019)

== Winners ==
Year	Winner	Age	Jockey	Trainer	Time
1998	Likely Story	3	Seb Sanders	John Dunlop	1:14.00
1999	Tedburrow	7	Willie Supple	Eric Alston	1:13.47
2000	Yorkies Boy	5	John Carroll	Alan Berry	1:13.87
2001	Vita Spericolata	4	Gary Carter	John Wainwright	1:13.03
2002	Vita Spericolata	5	Robert Winston	John Wainwright	1:14.60
2003	Resplendent Cee	4	Joe Fanning	Peter Harris	1:13.52
2004	Rum Shot	3	Fergus Sweeney	Henry Candy	1:12.94
2005	Indian Maiden	5	Franny Norton	Malcolm Saunders	1:15.00
2006	The Kiddykid	6	Stevie Donohoe	Paul Evans	1:13.37
2007	Green Manalishi	6	Neil Callan	Kevin Ryan	1:13.43
2008	Green Manalishi	7	Paul Hanagan	Kevin Ryan	1:13.90
2009	Doncaster Rover	3	Philip Makin	David Brown	1:13.55
2010	Masamah	4	Paul Hanagan	Kevin Ryan	1:13.15
2011	Rock Jock	4	Pat Shanahan	Tracey Collins	1:13.49
2012	Van Ellis	3	Joe Fanning	Mark Johnston	1:14.93
2013	Hitchens	8	Graham Gibbons	David Barron	1:16.20
2014	Intransigent	5	Oisin Murphy	Andrew Balding	1:16.23
2015	Eastern Impact	4	Jack Garritty	Richard Fahey	1:15.21
2016	Hillbilly Boy	6	Richard Kingscote	Tom Dascombe	1:13.68
2017	Kimberella	7	Paul Hanagan	Richard Fahey	1:15.22
2018	Kimberella	8	Paul Hanagan	Richard Fahey	1:13.49
2019	Major Jumbo	5	Kevin Stott	Kevin Ryan	1:14.91
2020	Judicial	8	Callum Rodriguez	Julie Camacho	1:12.51
2021	Judicial	9	Callum Rodriguez	Julie Camacho	1:13.90
2022	Ebro River	3	Ben Curtis	Hugo Palmer	1:19.38
2023	Mitbaahy	3	Ray Dawson	Roger Varian	1:16.66
2024	Quinault	4	Marco Ghiani	Stuart Williams	1:14.70
2025	Roman Dragon	6	Jason Watson	Hugo Palmer	1:12.69
2026	Simplify	3	Oisin Murphy	Andrew Balding	1:12.97

== See also ==
- Horse racing in Great Britain
- List of British flat horse races
