= Chipchase Stakes =

Flat horse race in Britain

- Class: Group 3
- Location: Newcastle Racecourse; Newcastle, England
- Inaugurated: 1994
- Race type: Flat / Thoroughbred
- Sponsor: Betfair
- Website: Newcastle

Race information
- Distance: 6f (1,207 metres)
- Surface: Tapeta
- Track: Straight
- Qualification: Three-years-old and up
- Weight: 8 st 10 lb (3yo); 9 st 3 lb (4yo+); Allowances; 3 lb for fillies and mares Penalties; 7 lb for Group 1 winners * 5 lb for Group 2 winners * 3 lb for Group 3 winners * * after 31 August 2018
- Purse: £45,368 (2022); 1st: £39,697

Chipchase Stakes
2026
Paborus	Marvelman	Symbol Of Honour

Previous years
2025
Diligent Harry	Annaf	Ferrous
2024
Montassib	Kinross	Willem Twee
2023
Tiber Flow	Spycatcher	Witch Hunter
2022
Sense Of Duty	Annaf	Bielsa
2021
Chil Chil	Good Effort	Diligent Harry

2020-2011
2020
Judicial	Brando	Major Jumbo
2019
Invincible Army	Laugh A Minute	Island Of Life
2018
Above The Rest	Yafta	Classical Times
2017
Koropick	Intisaab	Kimberella
2016
Markaz	Pretend	Watchable
2015
Aeolus	Mattmu	Danzeno
2014
Danzeno	Ruwaiyan	Saayerr
2013
Jack Dexter	Mass Rally	Mirza
2012
Maarek	Boastful	Regal Parade
2011
Genki	Doncaster Rover	Regal Parade

2010-2001
2010
Barney McGrew	Himalya	Bonnie Charlie
2009
Knot In Wood	Ancien Regime	Pusey Street Lady
2008
Utmost Respect	Zidane	Beckermet
2007
Confuchias	Appalachian Trail	Fonthill Road
2006
Fayr Jag	Beckermet	Celtic Mill
2005
Soldier's Tale	Quito	Steenberg
2004
Royal Millennium	Somnus	Ruby Rocket
2003
Orientor	Country Reel	Danger Over
2002
Tedburrow	Vision Of Night	Ashdown Express
2001
Firebolt	Bahamian Pirate	Industrial Pride

2000-1994
2000
Tedburrow	Cretan Gift	Deep Space
1999
Halmahera	Nigrasine	Wind Cheetah
1998
Andreyev	Cretan Gift	Jo Mell
1997
Tomba	Azizzi	Rambling Bear
1996
Sea Dane	Venture Capitalist	Warning Star
1995
Branston Abby	Inzar	Triple Joy
1994
Piccolo	Roger The Butler	Storiths

The Chipchase Stakes is a Group 3 flat horse race in Great Britain open to horses aged three years or older. It is run at Newcastle over a distance of 6 furlongs (1,207 metres), and it is scheduled to take place each year in late June or early July.

The event was established in 1994 and is named after Chipchase Castle, a Jacobean mansion situated approximately 30 miles north west of Newcastle. It was initially classed at Listed level before being promoted to Group 3 status in 2001. Since 2016 it has been run on a Tapeta all-weather track, having previously been contested on turf. It is one of four non-turf Group races in Britain, along with the Winter Derby, September Stakes and the Sirenia Stakes.

The Chipchase Stakes is run on the same afternoon as Newcastle's richest race, the Northumberland Plate.

== Records ==
Most successful horse (2 wins):

- Tedburrow – 2000, 2002

Leading jockey (2 wins):

- Darryll Holland – Branston Abby (1995), Andreyev (1998)
- Kevin Darley – Halmahera (1999), Soldier's Tale (2005)
- Paul Hanagan – Utmost Respect (2008), Knot in Wood (2009)
- Graham Lee - Maarek (2012), Jack Dexter (2103)
- George Baker - Genki (2011), Aeolus (2015)
- Tom Marquand - Sense of Duty (2022), Tiber Flow (2023)
- Callum Rodriguez - Judicial (2020), Paborus (2026)

Leading trainer (3 wins):

- William Haggas - Sense of Duty (2022), Tiber Flow (2023), Montassib (2024)

== Winners ==
Year	Winner	Age	Jockey	Trainer	Time
	Turf before 2016
1994	Piccolo	3	Franny Norton	Mick Channon	1:12.47
1995	Branston Abby	6	Darryll Holland	Mark Johnston	1:11.49
1996	Sea Dane (Note: Iktamal finished first in 1996, but he was relegated to fifth place following a stewards' inquiry)	3	Gary Hind	Peter Harris	1:13.72
1997	Tomba	3	Michael Tebbutt	Brian Meehan	1:18.35
1998	Andreyev	4	Darryll Holland	Richard Hannon Sr.	1:17.52
1999	Halmahera	4	Kevin Darley	Ian Balding	1:11.23
2000	Tedburrow	8	Willie Supple	Eric Alston	1:10.64
2001	Volata (Note: The 2001 winner Volata was later exported to Hong Kong and renamed Firebolt)	3	Ted Durcan	Mark Tompkins	1:12.90
2002	Tedburrow	10	Dean McKeown	Eric Alston	1:13.50
2003	Orientor	5	Kieren Fallon	Jim Goldie	1:13.72
2004	Royal Millennium	6	Richard Quinn	Mick Channon	1:13.03
2005	Soldier's Tale	4	Kevin Darley	Jeremy Noseda	1:13.50
2006	Fayr Jag	7	David Allan	Tim Easterby	1:10.92
2007	Confuchias	3	Neil Callan	Francis Ennis	1:16.80
2008	Utmost Respect	4	Paul Hanagan	Richard Fahey	1:16.23
2009	Knot in Wood	7	Paul Hanagan	Richard Fahey	1:14.03
2010	Barney McGrew	7	Phillip Makin	Michael Dods	1:10.74
2011	Genki	7	George Baker	Roger Charlton	1:13.76
2012	Maarek	5	Graham Lee	David Peter Nagle	1:19.15
2013	Jack Dexter	4	Graham Lee	Jim Goldie	1:13.83
2014	Danzeno	3	Andrew Mullen	Michael Appleby	1:12.53
2015	Aeolus	4	George Baker	Ed Walker	1:13.28
2016	Markaz	4	Paul Mulrennan	Owen Burrows	1:10.38
2017	Koropick	3	Josephine Gordon	Hugo Palmer	1:12.76
2018	Above The Rest	7	Ben Curtis	David Barron	1:10.91
2019	Invincible Army	4	P. J. McDonald	James Tate	1:11.33
2020	Judicial	8	Callum Rodriguez	Julie Camacho	1:12.27
2021	Chil Chil	5	Silvestre De Sousa	Andrew Balding	1:11.13
2022	Sense of Duty	3	Tom Marquand	William Haggas	1:12.21
2023	Tiber Flow	4	Tom Marquand	William Haggas	1:13.33
2024	Montassib	6	Cieren Fallon	William Haggas	1:11.21
2025	Dilligent Harry	7	Saffie Osborne	Clive Cox	1:12.55
2026	Paborus	5	Callum Rodriguez	Edward Bethell	1:11.32

== See also ==
- Horse racing in Great Britain
- List of British flat horse races
