= Southwell Racecourse =

Horse racing venue in Nottinghamshire, England

Southwell
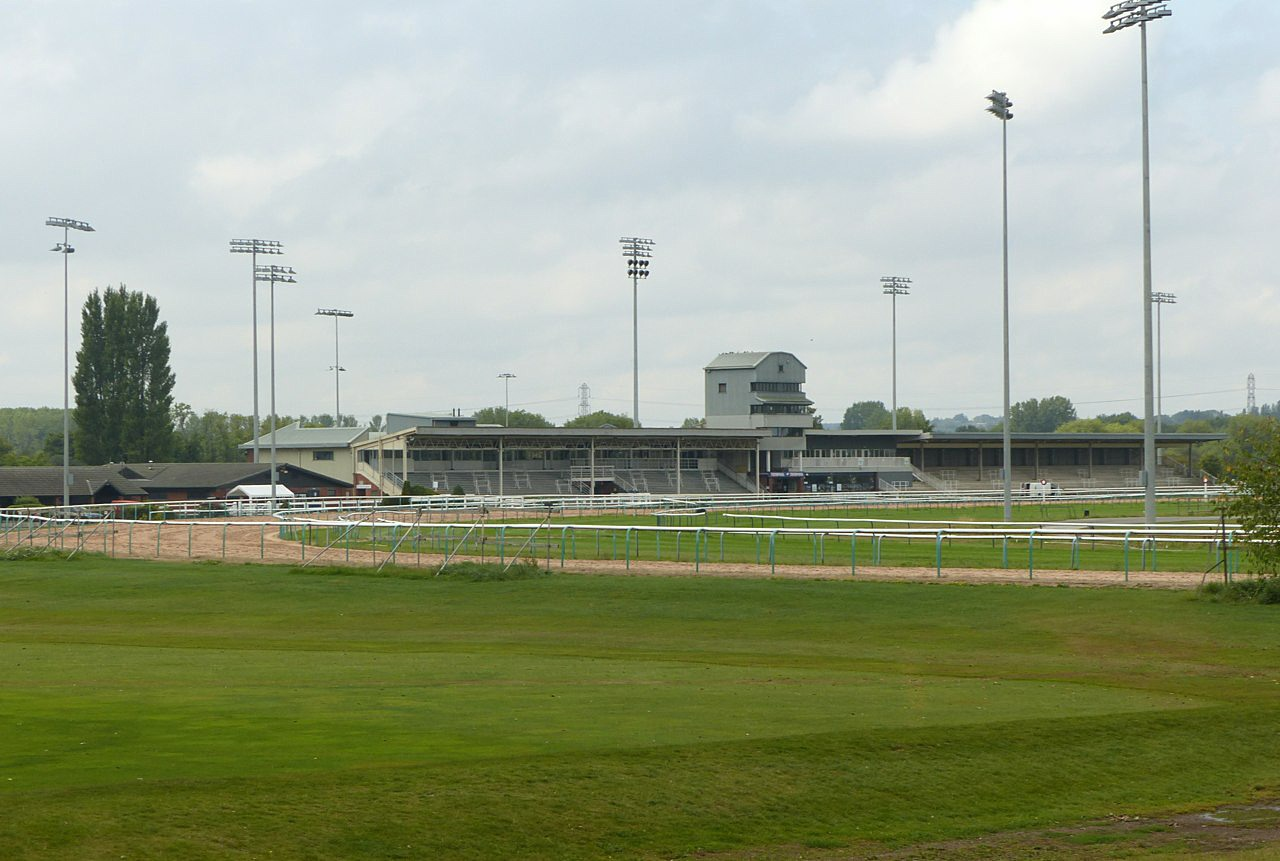
- The grandstand in 2020
- Interactive map of Southwell
- Location: Southwell, Nottinghamshire
- Coordinates: 53°04′10″N 0°54′22″W
- Owned by: Arena Racing Company
- Screened on: Sky Sports Racing
- Course type: Flat (all-weather); National Hunt

Southwell Racecourse (/ˈsaʊθwəl, -wɛl/ SOWTH-wəl, -wel, locally also /ˈsʌðəl/ SUDH-əl) is a thoroughbred horse racing venue located 2 miles (3 km) east of Southwell in Nottinghamshire, England. It is one of only six racecourses in the UK to have an all-weather track and is one of three courses in the UK with a Tapeta surface. Southwell previously used a track surface of Fibresand, a mixture of sand and wispy fibres before changing to Tapeta (a mixture of sand, wax and fibre) in 2021.

National Hunt racing on a turf course also takes place at Southwell. In 2007, the Great Yorkshire Chase (now Skybet Chase) was held at Southwell, while Doncaster Racecourse was closed for redevelopment.

Southwell racecourse will always be associated with female jockey Hayley Turner, who grew up locally and had her first job in racing with a trainer based adjacent to the track.

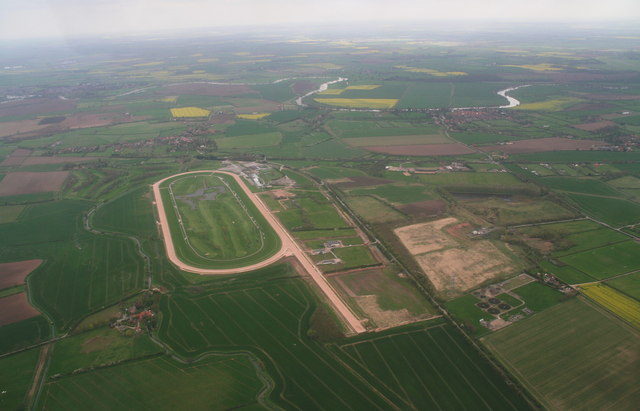
The course from the air

The racecourse was forced to close temporarily in December 2012 when flooding caused major damage to both the track and the buildings on site. Meetings scheduled for the all-weather flat course were transferred to Wolverhampton and Lingfield. The course successfully re-opened on 5 February 2013 with a seven-race flat meeting. Initial meetings following the re-opening had a limited capacity while renovations continued.

== Drone controversy ==
In January 2019, that 'betting' drones have become a nuisance at Southwell Racecourse. Drones have been flying over the racecourse and broadcasting live footage over the internet. BBC News pointed out that drone footage can be two seconds ahead of broadcasters, which gives punters a financial edge while "live betting." Greg Wood, a racing expert at the Guardian, said that racetracks are profiting from the time lag by selling tickets for boxes that have dedicated internet feeds. These feeds allow punters to use the fast connection to place bets. It was reported that drones had made an appearance "at every single meeting [at Southwell], for the last six months."

== Notable races ==
Month	DOW	Race Name	Type	Grade	Distance	Age/Sex
November	Friday	Churchill Stakes	A W Flat	Listed	1m 3f 23y	3yo +
November	Friday	Golden Rose Stakes	A W Flat	Listed	6f 16y	3yo +
