= Tandridge Stakes =

Flat horse race in Britain

- Class: Listed
- Location: Lingfield Park; Lingfield, England
- Race type: Flat / Thoroughbred
- Sponsor: BetMGM
- Website: Lingfield Park

Race information
- Distance: 1m 1y (1,610 metres)
- Surface: Polytrack
- Track: Left-handed
- Qualification: Four-years-old and up
- Weight: 9 st 2 lb Allowances; 5 lb for fillies and mares Penalties; 7 lb for Group 1 or Group 2 winners * 3 lb for Group 2 winners * 3 lb for Listed winners * * since 31 August 2023
- Purse: £50,000 (2024); 1st: £28,355

Tandridge Stakes
2025
Tyrrhenian Sea	Maljoom	Popmaster

Previous years
2024
Dear My Friend	Nine Tenths	Diderot
2023
Manaafith	Sir Busker	Lord Of The Lodge
2022
Fancy Man	King Of The South	Living Legend
2021
Bangkok	Felix	Forest Of Dean

2020-2011
2020
Bangkok	Court House	Dalgarno
2019
Wissahickon	Big Country	Court House
2018
Utmost	Victory Bond	Battle Of Marathon
2017
Decorated Knight	Arab Spring	Battalion
2016
Grendisar	Festive Fare	Lamar
2015
Grendisar	Lamar	Cloudscape
2014
Grandeur	Modernstone	Anaconda
2013
Planteur	Miblish	Tepmokea
2012
Junoob	Tinshu	Loyalty

2010-2001
2010
Gitano Hernando	Suits Me	Mister Green
2009
Re Barolo	Suits Me	Scintillo
2008
Dansant	Dubai's Touch	Baylini
2007
Cusoon	Blue Bajan	Mighty
2006
Grand Passion	Red Spell	Counsel's Opinion
2005
Eccentric	Gig Harbor	Tahtheeb
2004
Skidmark	Chasing The Dream	Countrywide Flyer
2004
Grand Passion	Eastern Breeze	Corriolanus
2003
Parasol	Adiemus	Pawn Broker
2002
Adiemus	Laissezaller	I Cried For You
2001
Resplendent Star	Hail The Chief	Sylva Storm

2000-1999
2000
Zanay	Tallulah Belle	Hugwity
1999
Pas de Memoires	Refuse To Lose	Punishment

The Tandridge Stakes is a Listed flat horse race in Great Britain open to horses aged four years or older. It is run over a distance of 1 mile and 1 yard (1,702 metres) at Lingfield Park in February. Prior to 2023 the race was named the Winter Derby Trial and run over 1 mile and 2 furlongs. First run in 1999, it was run as an ungraded conditions race prior to 2007. The race was reduced in distance to 1 mile and renamed the Tandridge Stakes from the 2023 running.

The race served as a trial for the Winter Derby, a Group 3 race run over the same course & distance 21 days later. From 2000, five horses won both races - Zanay (2000), Adiemus (2002), Eccentric (2005), Grendisar (2016), and Wissahickon (2019).

== Records ==
Most successful horse (2 wins):

- Grand Passion – 2004, 2006
- Grendisar - 2015, 2016
- Bangkok - 2020, 2021

Leading jockey (3 wins):

- Kieren Fallon – Parasol (2003), Grand Passion (2004), Gitano Hernando (2010)

Leading trainer (5 wins):

- Marco Botti – Re Barolo (2009), Gitano Hernando (2010), Planteur (2013), Grendisar (2015, 2016)

== Winners ==
Year	Winner	Age	Jockey	Trainer	Time
1999	Pas de Memoires	4	Dean McKeown	Karl Burke	2:04.47
2000	Zanay	4	Tom McLaughlin	Jacqui Doyle	2:04.97
2001	Resplendent Star	4	Micky Fenton	Peter Harris	2:07.88
2002	Adiemus	4	Shane Kelly	Jeremy Noseda	2:05.34
2003	Parasol	4	Kieren Fallon	David Loder	2:03.97
2004	Grand Passion	4	Kieren Fallon	Geoff Wragg	2:05.47
2005	Eccentric	4	John Egan	Andrew Reid	2:05.25
2006	Grand Passion	6	Steve Drowne	Geoff Wragg	2:04.46
2007	Cusoon	5	George Baker	Gary Moore	2:01.79
2008	Dansant	4	Jamie Spencer	Gerard Butler	2:04.43
2009	Re Barolo	6	John Egan	Marco Botti	2:05.76
2010	Gitano Hernando	4	Kieren Fallon	Marco Botti	2:01.97
2011	Suits Me	8	Micky Fenton	Tom Tate	2:06.72
2012	Junoob	4	Richard Kingscote	Tom Dascombe	2:05.58
2013	Planteur	6	Adam Kirby	Marco Botti	2:01.20
2014	Grandeur	5	Ryan Moore	Jeremy Noseda	2:01.17
2015	Grendisar	5	Martin Harley	Marco Botti	2:02.58
2016	Grendisar	6	Adam Kirby	Marco Botti	2:03.68
2017	Decorated Knight	5	Andrea Atzeni	Roger Charlton	2:01.55
2018	Utmost	4	Robert Havlin	John Gosden	2:02.23
2019	Wissahickon	4	Frankie Dettori	John Gosden	2:01.53
2020	Bangkok	4	Rob Hornby	Andrew Balding	2:00.54
2021	Bangkok	5	Ryan Moore	Andrew Balding	2:04.17
2022	Fancy Man	4	Sean Levey	Richard Hannon Jr.	2:04.65
2023	Manaafith	4	Jim Crowley	Roger Varian	1:34.25
2024	Dear My Friend	4	Joe Fanning	Charlie Johnston	1:35.49
2025	Tyrrhenian Sea	7	Jack Mitchell	Roger Varian	1:37.29
2026	Chancellor	4	Robert Havlin	John & Thady Gosden	1:38.37

== See also ==
- Horse racing in Great Britain
- List of British flat horse races
