= Festival Stakes (Great Britain) =

Flat horse race in Britain

Festival Stakes
2026
Boiling Point	Naqeeb	Enfjaar

Previous years
2025
Liberty Lane	Meydaan	Silver Knott
2024
Isle Of Jura	Mujtaba	Passion And Glory
2023
King Of Conquest	Francesco Clemente	Phantom Flight
2022
Majestic Dawn	West End Charmer	Stormy Antarctic
2021
Stormy Antarctic	Desert Encounter	Winter Reprise

2020-2011
2019
Elarqam	Willie John	Thundering Blue
2018
First Sitting	Autocratic	Spark Plug
2017
First Sitting	Spark Plug	Mount Logan
2016
Decorated Knight	Educate	Black Cherry
2015
The Corsican	Educate	Lamar
2014
French Navy	Windhoek	Nabucco
2013
Rewarded	Stipulate	Reckoning
2012
Jet Away	Fiorente	Retrieve
2011
City Leader	Class Is Class	Principal Role

2010-2001
2010
Class Is Class	Laaheb	Drunken Sailor
2009
Tranquil Tiger	Halicarnassus	Charlie Farnsbarns
2008
Sixties Icon	Sweet Lilly	Spice Route
2007
Illustrious Blue	Road To Love	Imperial Star
2006
Blue Monday	Mountain High	Vol De Nuit
2004
Alkaadhem	Compton Bolter	Big Bad Bob
2003
Island House	Rawyaan	Endless Hall
2002
Imperial Dancer	Island House	Border Arrow
2001
Mubtaker	Nooshman	Pawn Broker

2000-1991
2000
Island House	Right Wing	Annapurna
1999
Great Dane	Diamond White	Docksider
1998
Faithful Son	Musalsal	Lonely Heart
1997
Germano	King Alex	Medaille Militaire
1996
Captain Horatius	Wijara	Lear White
1995
Baron Ferdinand	Ionio	Belle Argentine
1994
Alderbrook	Wagon Master	Instant Affair
1993
Red Bishop	Bobzao	Jeune
1992
Flashfoot	Jura	Gai Bulga
1991
Spritsail	Lord Charmer	Game Plan

1990-1988
1990
Relief Pitcher	Observation Post	Charmer
1989
Sweet Chesne	Hibernian Gold	Insan
1988
Mtoto	Media Starguest	Bengal Fire

The Festival Stakes is a Listed flat horse race in Great Britain open to horses aged four years or older. It is run at Goodwood over a distance of 1 mile 1 furlong 197 yards (1,991 metres), and it is scheduled to take place each year in May.

Until 1996 the race was known as the Clive Graham Stakes, after the racing journalist (also known as "The Scout" of the Daily Express).

== Winners ==
Year	Winner	Age	Jockey	Trainer	Time
1988	Mtoto	5	Michael Roberts	Alec Stewart	Not taken
1989	Sweet Chesne	4	Steve Cauthen	Henry Cecil	2:08.01
1990	Relief Pitcher	4	Pat Eddery	Peter Walwyn	2:06.93
1991	Spritsail	5	Pat Eddery	Henry Cecil	2:07.64
1992	Flashfoot	4	Ray Cochrane	Ian Balding	2:07.09
1993	Red Bishop	5	Michael Roberts	John Gosden	2:11.33
1994	Alderbrook	5	Paul Eddery	Kim Bailey	2:12.11
1995	Baron Ferdinand	5	Pat Eddery	Roger Charlton	2:09.15
1996	Captain Horatius	7	Richard Quinn	John Dunlop	2:13.44
1997	Germano	4	Michael Hills	Geoff Wragg	2:10.14
1998	Faithful Son	4	John Reid	Saeed bin Suroor	2:06.36
1999	Great Dane	4	Kieren Fallon	Henry Cecil	2:07.36
2000	Island House	4	Michael Roberts	Geoff Wragg	2:14.13
2001	Mubtaker	4	Richard Hills	Marcus Tregoning	2:05.82
2002	Imperial Dancer	4	Chris Catlin	Mick Channon	2:07.48
2003	Island House	7	Darryll Holland	Geoff Wragg	2:07.90
2004	Alkaadhem	4	Richard Hills	Marcus Tregoning	2:06.13
2005	Abandoned due to fog
2006	Blue Monday	5	Steve Drowne	Roger Charlton	2:14.71
2007	Illustrious Blue	4	Paul Doe	William Knight	2:05.66
2008	Sixties Icon	5	Ryan Moore	Jeremy Noseda	2:08.31
2009	Tranquil Tiger	5	Tom Queally	Henry Cecil	2:05.69
2010	Class Is Class	4	Ryan Moore	Sir Michael Stoute	2:05.00
2011	City Leader	6	Martin Dwyer	Brian Meehan	2:06.63
2012	Jet Away	5	Tom Queally	Sir Henry Cecil	2:03.51
2013	Rewarded	4	Kirsty Milczarek	James Toller	2:09.24
2014	French Navy	6	Adam Kirby	Charlie Appleby	2:14.70
2015	The Corsican	4	Jim Crowley	David Simcock	2:04.73
2016	Decorated Knight	4	Andrea Atzeni	Roger Charlton	2:14.56
2017	First Sitting	6	Gérald Mossé	Chris Wall	2:09.06
2018	First Sitting	7	Gérald Mossé	Chris Wall	2:08.66
2019	Elarqam	4	Dane O'Neill	Mark Johnston	2:05.68
	no race 2020 (Note: The 2020 running was cancelled because of the COVID-19 pandemic in the United Kingdom)
2021	Stormy Antarctic	8	Richard Kingscote	Ed Walker	2:11.74
2022	Majestic Dawn	6	Jim Crowley	Paul & Oliver Cole	2:08.83
2023	King Of Conquest	4	James Doyle	Charlie Appleby	2:05.48
2024	Isle Of Jura	4	Callum Shepherd	George Scott	2:06.82
2025	Liberty Lane	5	Clifford Lee	Karl Burke	2:06.59
2026	Boiling Point	5	Shane Gray	Karl Burke	2:07.04

== See also ==
- Horse racing in Great Britain
- List of British flat horse races
