= Jeremy Noseda =

British horse trainer

Jeremy Noseda (born 17 September 1963) is a retired British racehorse trainer and a British Classic winner. Over his career he recorded 14 Group One and grade one wins, as well as 871 wins in 5294 races in Britain across his 23 years he spent training 62 of those wins came in 2011. His most memorable year came in 2006 in which he won the Irish 2,000 Guineas, St. Leger Stakes, Fillies' Mile and St. James's Palace Stakes

== Career ==
After six years working for John Dunlop, and five years as assistant to John Gosden, he joined Sheikh Mohammed's Godolphin operation in late 1993 and played a significant role in training such horses as Lammtarra, Halling and Balanchine.

Noseda started training under his own name in January 1996, initially in California, then returning to Britain in late 1997 brimming with ideas and enthusiasm. Success soon followed with his first major win coming at the Empress Stakes with Wannabe Grand in June 1998 and a further win with Wannabe Grand coming at Group 2 race Champagne Stakes (Great Britain) and later that year his Group One win came at Cheveley Park Stakes with Wannabe Grand in 1998, ending his first year with 18 wins overall. This form continued into 1999 with another win with Wannabe Grand at the Flying Fillies' Stakes, ending the year with 39 wins. Though not winning a group 1 race for the second year running, success still came in 2000 with a win at Group 3 Musidora Stakes, and once again improved by ending the year with 40 wins. In 2001, Noseda won group 3 race Nell Gwyn Stakes as well as the Princess Margaret Stakes, however he only achieved 37 wins in 2002.

The year 2003 was a massive year for Noseda, with another win coming at the Musidora Stakes, with Group 2 wins coming at Gimcrack Stakes, Lowther Stakes and the Challenge Stakes. Further wins came at flat horse race Two-Year-Old Trophy, Class A race Rockingham Stakes and Horris Hill Stakes. Furthermore Noseda also managed to win his first group one race in 5 years with two wins coming at Middle Park Stakes and once again at Cheveley Park Stakes, recording 38 wins overall. In 2004, Noseda had one of his most notable victories come at the Breeders' Cup Juvenile with Wilko, with another less notable win coming at Group 2 Norfolk Stakes (Great Britain), however Noseda only recorded 34 wins in 2004. The year 2005 was another fantastic year for Noseda with him achieving 47 wins with a group one win coming at Sussex Stakes and other notable wins coming at the UAE 2000 Guineas, Heron Stakes, National Stakes (Sandown Park) with group 3 wins also coming at the Jersey Stakes, Albany Stakes (Great Britain) and the Chipchase Stakes.

Noseda, managed to improve his reputation as a top quality trainer, starting 2006 with wins at the UAE 1000 Guineas, Spring Trophy, Albany Stakes (Great Britain), Dragon Stakes, Gordon Stakes and the May Hill Stakes as well as taking 4 massive group one wins with the first coming at the Irish 2,000 Guineas, St James's Palace Stakes, his only British classic at the St Leger Stakes and then a group one wins at the Fillies' Mile with Noseda ending the year with 46 wins in total. Noseda continued this great form into 2007 with 2 more group one wins coming at the Golden Jubilee Stakes as well as the Falmouth Stakes in July, he succeeded in winning 4 group 2 races, with the wins coming at Jockey Club Stakes, Richmond Stakes, Flying Childers Stakes, Park Stakes and less notable wins coming at Molecomb Stakes and the River Eden Fillies' Stakes with Noseda taking an overall 56 wins in 2007.

2008 marked another highly successful year, however less successful than the previous two. However, Noseda still won 61 races including lots of major wins such as the Festival Stakes (Great Britain), Temple Stakes, Cecil Frail Stakes, Glorious Stakes ,Geoffrey Freer Stakes, Molecomb Stakes, Richmond Stakes, Weatherbys Super Sprint, Park Stakes, October Stakes and the Cumberland Lodge Stakes marking a successful year with plenty of victories. 2009 ended with 61 wins with Noseda also having a record high 334 runs, Noseda also managed to win his first group one since 2007 at the July Cup as well as the Newmarket Stakes, Royal Hunt Cup, Scarbrough Stakes, World Trophy, Challenge Stakes (Great Britain) and the Gillies Fillies' Stakes marking off a good year for Noseda.

In March 2010, Noseda took a number of Group 2 and Group 3 wins including the Gotham Stakes, Wokingham Stakes, Railway Stakes, Princess of Wales's Stakes, Gordon Stakes, Geoffrey Freer Stakes and then he capped off the year with a magnificent run at the Irish St. Leger. Overall in 2010, Noseda recorded 55 wins. Although, 2011 marked a decline in the amount of runs Noseda made each year however he still managed to achieve a career best of 62 wins as well as 24% of the races he entered including major races such as the Jimmy Winkfield Stakes, Solario Stakes, Geoffrey Freer Stakes and his final group one and grade one win at the Belmont Derby. 2012, Noseda proceeded to win 47 races including notable listed, group 2 and 3 races including the International Trial Stakes, Oak Tree Stakes, Solario Stakes and the Twilight Derby. 2013 continued to mark a slight decline for Noseda, and although he managed to win 51 races he once again did not win a group one race, however he still won more minor races such as the Conqueror Stakes, Foundation Stakes as well as the Golden Rose Stakes.

Noseda whilst maintaining a good win percentage, continued losing horses and having less to run resulting in him winning only 34 races in 2014, notable races Nosed won in 2014 include the Tandridge Stakes, Foundation Stakes and finally he became the 8th trainer to win the Hyde Stakes. 2015, marked 31 wins for Noseda and a noticeable decline in the number of horses he had and Noseda struggled to find horses that could win major races. 2016, marked a brief return in good form for Noseda with Major wins coming at Prix du Ranelagh, Michael Seely Memorial Stakes and the City of York Stakes, however he managed to win 19 races the least since his first year of horse training. In 2017, Noseda won 28 races and in 2018 won a career low 18 races, however he managed to win 2 major races which were the Burradon Stakes and the Chelmsford City Cup. In 2019, Noseda announced his retirement in June 19 with his final major win coming at the Westow Stakes capping off a career with many highs and many lows.

He was based at the Shalfleet stables in Newmarket formerly occupied by Paul Kelleway. He enjoyed his first Classic victory when Araafa won the Irish 2,000 Guineas in 2006. His first triumph in an English Classic came the same year with Sixties Icon winning the St Leger at York. He retired from training in June 2019, saddling his final runner in the Wokingham Stakes at Ascot.

Noseda was educated the Jesuit Catholic school, Stonyhurst College located in Clitheroe.

== Major wins ==
(United Kingdom) Great Britain

- Cheveley Park Stakes - (2) - Wannabe Grand (1998), Carry On Katie (2003)
- Falmouth Stakes - (1) - Simply Perfect (2007)
- Fillies' Mile - (1) - Simply Perfect (2006)
- Golden Jubilee Stakes - (1) - Soldier's Tale (2007)
- July Cup - (1) - Fleeting Spirit (2009)
- Middle Park Stakes - (1) - Balmont (2003)
- St. James's Palace Stakes - (1) - Araafa (2006)
- St. Leger - (1) - Sixties Icon (2006)
- Sussex Stakes - (1) - Proclamation (2005)

(Republic of Ireland) Ireland

- Irish 2,000 Guineas - (1) - Araafa (2006)
- Irish St Leger - (1) - Sans Frontieres (2010)

United States

- Breeders' Cup Juvenile - (1) - Wilko (2004)
- Jamaica Handicap - (1) - Western Aristocrat (2011)
