= Golden Rose Stakes (Great Britain) =

Flat horse race in Britain

- Class: Listed
- Location: Southwell Racecourse; Southwell, England
- Race type: Flat / Thoroughbred
- Sponsor: Midnite
- Website: Southwell

Race information
- Distance: 6f 16y (1,222 metres)
- Surface: Tapeta
- Track: Straight
- Qualification: Three-years-old and up
- Weight: 9 st 5 lb Allowances 5 lb for fillies Penalties; 3 lb for Listed winners* 5 lb for Group 3 winners* 7 lb for Group 2 or Group 1 winners* * after 31 March
- Purse: £50,000 (2025); 1st: £28,355

Golden Rose Stakes
2023
Willem Twee	Kinta	Exalted Angel

Previous years
2022
Summerghand	Judicial	Exalted Angel
2021
Good Effort	Judicial	Soldier's Minute

2020-2011
2020
Good Effort	Lampang	On The Warpath
2019
Judicial	Tinto	Soldier's Minute
2018
Encrypted	Intisaab	Kimberella
2017
Gifted Master	Mythmaker	Out Do
2016
Lord Of The Land	Mythmaker	Kimberella
2015
Goken	Jamesie	Magnus Maximus
2014
Intransigent	Fresles	Polybius
2013
Valbchek	Take Cover	Lancelot Du Lac
2012
Ballista	Ladies Are Forever	Hezmah
2011
Docofthebay	Secret Witness	Global City

2010-2007
2010
Hitchens	Enact	Brave Prospector
2009
Jaconet	Ebraam	Himalaya
2008
Duff	Maltese Falcon	Swiss Franc
2007
Maltese Falcon	Borderlescott	Desert Lord

The Golden Rose Stakes is a Listed flat horse race in Great Britain open to horses aged three years or older. From 2007 to 2023 it was run at Lingfield Park over a distance of 6 furlongs and 1 yard (1,028 metres), and it is scheduled to take place each year in November. In 2024 the race was run at Newcastle and from 2025 it will move to Southwell.

== Winners ==
Year	Winner	Age	Jockey	Trainer	Time
2007	Maltese Falcon	7	Nelson De Souza	Paul Cole	1:09.80
2008	Duff	5	Kevin Manning	Edward Lynam	1:10.38
2009	Jaconet	4	Philip Makin	David Barron	1:10.46
2010	Hitchens	5	Graham Gibbons	David Barron	1:11.04
2011	Docofthebay	7	Frederik Tylicki	David Nicholls	1:10.89
2012	Ballista	4	Richard Kingscote	Tom Dascombe	1:10.35
2013	Valbchek	4	Shane Kelly	Jeremy Noseda	1:09.42
2014	Intransigent	5	Jamie Spencer	Andrew Balding	1:09.98
2015	Goken	3	Graham Lee	Kevin Ryan	1:09.59
2016	Lord Of The Land	5	James Doyle	David O'Meara	1:10.03
2017	Gifted Master	4	James Doyle	Hugo Palmer	1:09.68
2018	Encrypted	3	Josephine Gordon	Hugo Palmer	1:10.34
2019	Judicial	7	Callum Rodriguez	Julie Camacho	1:10.46
2020	Good Effort	5	Ray Dawson	Ismail Mohammed	1:08.99
2021	Good Effort	6	Jim Crowley	Ismail Mohammed	1:09.25
2022	Summerghand	8	Daniel Tudhope	David O'Meara	1:10.04
2023	Willem Twee	4	Oisin Murphy	James Fanshawe	1:10.25
2024	Night Raider	3	Oisin Murphy	Karl Burke	1:10.79
2025	Royal Zabeel	4	Jason Watson	Michael Appleby	1:13.17

== See also ==
- Horse racing in Great Britain
- List of British flat horse races
