= Ed Dunlop =

British horse trainer

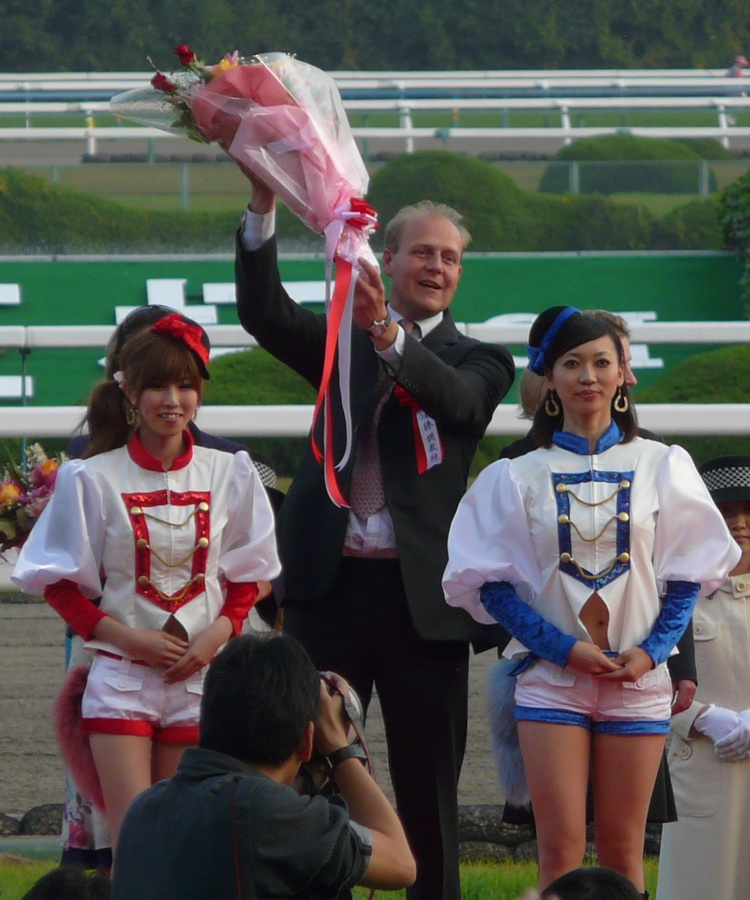
Dunlop in 2010

Edward A. L. Dunlop (born 20 October 1968) is a British thoroughbred racehorse trainer.

Dunlop is the son of British champion trainer John Dunlop. He was educated at Sunningdale School and Eton College. He began his career on stud farms in Ireland and Kentucky before completing the National Stud student course in Sydney, Australia.

Upon returning to Britain he spent three years as assistant to Nicky Henderson, then joined Alex Scott at his Newmarket Stables. When Scott was murdered in 1994 Dunlop took over and renamed the business Gainsborough Stables. The new stable had its first winner on 19 October 1994 and since then has sent entrants to races as far-flung as Istanbul, Dubai, Milan, Ireland and the United States. In 2003 alone the stable had 50 winners, and such prestigious owners as Edward Stanley, 19th Earl of Derby, have placed horses to train with Dunlop. Notable horses include Ouija Board (won 47%, £2 million).

Dunlop married in 1996 and has three daughters.

== Major wins ==
(United Kingdom) Great Britain

- Ascot Gold Cup – (1) – Trip To Paris (2015)
- Haydock Sprint Cup – (1) – Iktamal (1996)
- Nassau Stakes – (2) – Lailani (2001), Ouija Board (2006)
- Oaks – (2) – Ouija Board (2004) Snow Fairy (2010)
- Prince of Wales's Stakes – (1) – Ouija Board (2006)
- Sun Chariot Stakes – (1) – Independence (2001)
- Sussex Stakes – (1) – Court Masterpiece (2006)

Canada

- Canadian International Stakes – (1) – Joshua Tree (2013)
- E. P. Taylor Stakes – (1) – Fraulein (2002)

France

- Poule d'Essai des Pouliches – (1) – Ta Rib (1996)
- Prix de la Forêt – (1) – Court Masterpiece (2005)
- Prix Jean Romanet – (1) – Snow Fairy (2012)

Hong Kong

- Hong Kong Vase – (1) – Ouija Board (2005), Red Cadeaux (2012)
- Hong Kong Cup – (1) – Snow Fairy (2010)

(Republic of Ireland) Ireland

- Irish Champion Stakes – (1) – Snow Fairy (2012)
- Irish Oaks – (3) – Lailani (2001), Ouija Board (2004), Snow Fairy (2010)
- Matron Stakes – (1) – Independence (2001)

Italy

- Gran Criterium – (1) – Night Style (1999)

Japan

- Queen Elizabeth II Commemorative Cup – (2) – Snow Fairy (2010, 2011)

United States

- Breeders' Cup Filly & Mare Turf – (2) – Ouija Board (2004, 2006)
- Flower Bowl Invitational Stakes – (1) – Lailani (2001)
- Long Island Handicap – (1) – Dalvina (2007)

Spain

- Copa de Oro de San Sebastián – (1) – Amazing Red (2019)
