= Julie Camacho =

British racehorse trainer

Personal information
- Born: November 1966 (age 59)
- Occupation: Trainer

Horse racing career
- Sport: Horse racing

Major racing wins
- Sprint Stakes; Chipchase Stakes; Commonwealth Cup; July Cup

Significant horses
- Judicial, Shaquille

Julie Camacho (born November 1966) is a British Group 1 winning racehorse trainer who specialises in training horses for flat racing. She trains near Malton, North Yorkshire, with her husband Steve Brown as assistant trainer. In 2023 she became the first female trainer in Britain to pass the £1 million mark in prize money in a season.

== Career ==
Camacho took over the licence at Star Cottage yard in Malton from her father, Maurice Camacho, in 1998. Her husband, Steve Brown, who had formerly been assistant to Luca Cumani, became her assistant trainer. As well as training, the family also breed racehorses. Although Camacho trains mainly on the flat, she holds a dual licence. She saddled a runner in the 1999 Grand National; Avro Anson finished in 17th place.

Camacho achieved her first Group race win in 2018, when Judicial won the Group 3 Sprint Stakes at Sandown Park. He went on to win the Beverley Bullet Sprint Stakes and the Golden Rose Stakes in 2019, the Group 3 Chipchase Stakes in 2020, and the Queensferry Stakes in 2020 and 2021. He was still winning aged ten in 2022.

It was another sprinter, Shaquille, who provided Camacho with her first Group 1 win and also her first Royal Ascot win, with victory in the Commonwealth Cup on 23 June 2023. Three weeks later he claimed another Group 1 victory when winning the July Cup at Newmarket. After the race Camacho said: "It's a massive moment. We are a small yard in the North. It's lovely to be able to come down here with a horse like him and show how good he is." With Shaquille's win in the July Cup, Camacho became the first female trainer in Britain to win more than £1 million prize money in a season.

== Major wins ==
(United Kingdom) Great Britain

- Commonwealth Cup - (1) - Shaquille (2023)
- July Cup - (1) - Shaquille (2023)
