= Alex Scott (racehorse trainer) =

British racehorse trainer

Personal information
- Born: 8 February 1960 Great Britain
- Died: 30 September 1994 (aged 34)
- Occupation: Trainer

Horse racing career
- Sport: Horse racing

Major racing wins
- Breeders' Cup Sprint

Significant horses
- Sheikh Albadou, Lammtarra.

Alexander Archibald Scott (8 February 1960 – 30 September 1994) was a British thoroughbred racehorse trainer. In six seasons as a licence-holder, Scott trained 164 winners. His most notable horses were the future Epsom Derby winner Lammtarra and the 1991 Breeders' Cup Sprint winner Sheikh Albadou. In 1994, Scott was shot and killed by a groom at Glebe Farm Stud near Newmarket; he was 34.

== Family background, education and early life ==
Alex Scott was the third son of Sir James Scott, 2nd Baronet of Rotherfield Park, former Lord Lieutenant of Hampshire, and commanding officer of the Household Cavalry's mounted regiment. His parents bred and raced horses and staged an annual horse-trials event on the family's estate.

Scott was educated at Eton and Queens' College, Cambridge, where he studied theology before switching to land economy. In 1981, he began working as assistant trainer to Peter Calver, moving to Harry Thomson Jones at Newmarket a year later and then, in 1985, joining Dick Hern at West Ilsley in Berkshire.

== Career as a trainer ==
=== Success ===
In June 1988, Scott was offered the position of trainer at Sheikh Maktoum Al-Maktoum's Oak Stables in Newmarket. The previous trainer, Olivier Douieb, had returned to France because of ill-health. Scott had been intending to set up on his own that year, buying Fitzroy House stables in Newmarket for that purpose. Sheikh Maktoum offered him the freedom to work for other owners and the chance to train a number of high-class horses, including Cadeaux Genereux, who finished first in the Prix de l'Abbaye at Longchamp but was disqualified after a stewards' inquiry.

Scott quickly established a reputation as one of the leading young Flat trainers in Britain. In his first season, 1989, Cadeaux Genereux won two Group One sprints, the July Cup at Newmarket and the Nunthorpe Stakes at York. Two years later Scott won the Breeders' Cup Sprint on the dirt track at Churchill Downs, Kentucky, with Sheikh Albadou. Victory in that race made Sheikh Albadou one of only two British-trained winners in the history of the Breeders' Cup and the only British winner on a dirt track. Scott had trained his horse on a sand-and-fiber surface for the previous five months to prepare for the race.

1991 was also the year in which Scott won his first Classic race with Possessive Dancer's victory in the Irish Oaks at The Curragh. The following season Sheikh Albadou returned to win the King's Stand Stakes at Royal Ascot and the Haydock Sprint Cup, giving him career winnings of $1.23 million, while there was also success for Fraam in the Golden Mile at Goodwood.

=== Lammtarra ===
In June 1995, Lammtarra won The Derby in a then record time. The impeccably bred Lammtarra, by Nijinsky, a Derby winner himself, and out of an Oaks winner, Snow Bride, had been trained for his only run as a two-year-old by Scott, who had been killed in the season preceding the Derby victory. Scott had selected Lammtarra as a yearling from among those at Sheikh Maktoum's Gainsborough Farm, Kentucky, unusually being given a first pick ahead of fellow trainers Sir Michael Stoute and Criquette Head.

Scott had placed a £1,000 bet on Lammtarra to win the Derby with Ladbrokes at 33–1. When the colt came home in front at Epsom after the trainer's death, the bookmakers paid out to Scott's widow. Trained by Godolphin's trainer Saeed Bin Suroor, Lammtarra went on to win the King George VI and Queen Elizabeth Stakes at Ascot and the Prix de l'Arc de Triomphe at Longchamp.

== Glebe Farm stud ==
In December 1992, Scott bought Glebe House and its stud farm at Cheveley, Newmarket. Scott's wife, Julia, continued to run the stud successfully after the death of her husband, basing the operation around a small number of mares, including Corndavon, whom Scott had bred in partnership with Craig Bandoroff; Palace Street, dam of Sakhee's Secret; and Ferber's Follies, a daughter of Saratoga Six.

== Death ==
On 30 September 1994, Scott was shot in the chest and killed by a stud groom, William O'Brien, using a single barrel shotgun. O'Brien and Scott had become involved in a dispute that culminated with O'Brien telling the trainer that he could "stuff his job". O'Brien had reportedly disagreed with Scott's working methods since his takeover of the farm in 1992. The following day Scott sent O'Brien a letter asking for confirmation of his resignation. There was then a confrontation in a barn at Glebe Stud Farm in which Scott was killed. The jury in the case rejected the defence's assertion that O'Brien was guilty of manslaughter, rather than murder.

The Alex Scott Memorial Fund Assistant Trainers' Scholarship was established in 1996 to provide assistant trainers with the chance to spend a month gaining experience of working outside Britain.

== Personal life ==
Scott married Julia Mary Mackenzie in 1986. They had two sons and one daughter.
