= Goodwood Racecourse =

Horse racing venue in England

Coordinates: 50°53′49″N 0°44′33″W

Goodwood
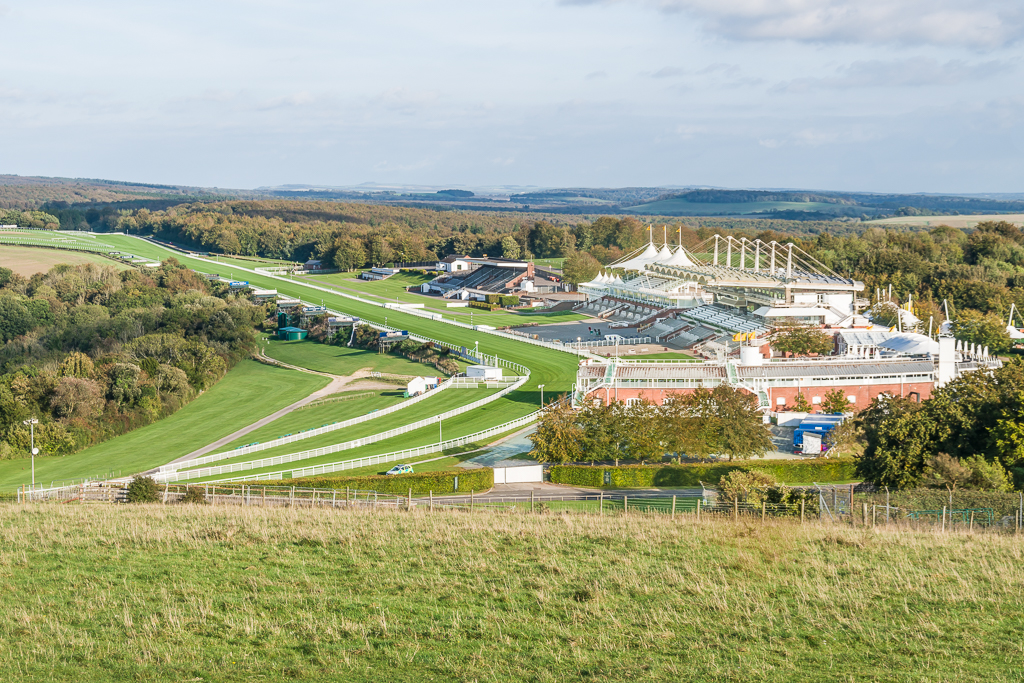
- Interactive map of Goodwood
- Location: Chichester, West Sussex
- Owned by: Goodwood Estate
- Date opened: May 1801
- Screened on: Racing TV; ITV
- Course type: Flat
- Notable races: Stewards' Cup; Nassau Stakes; Goodwood Cup; Sussex Stakes

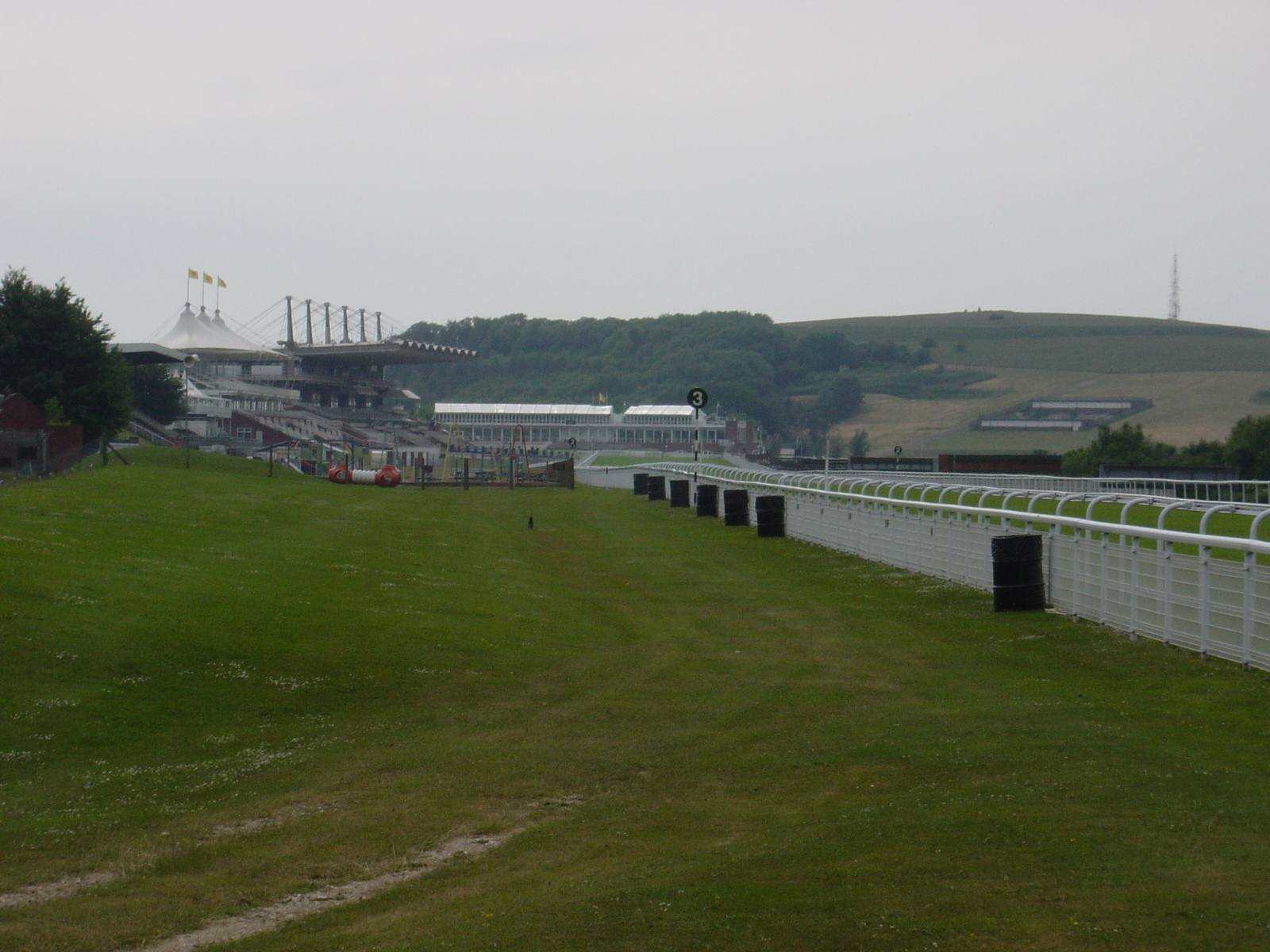
Goodwood Racecourse stand

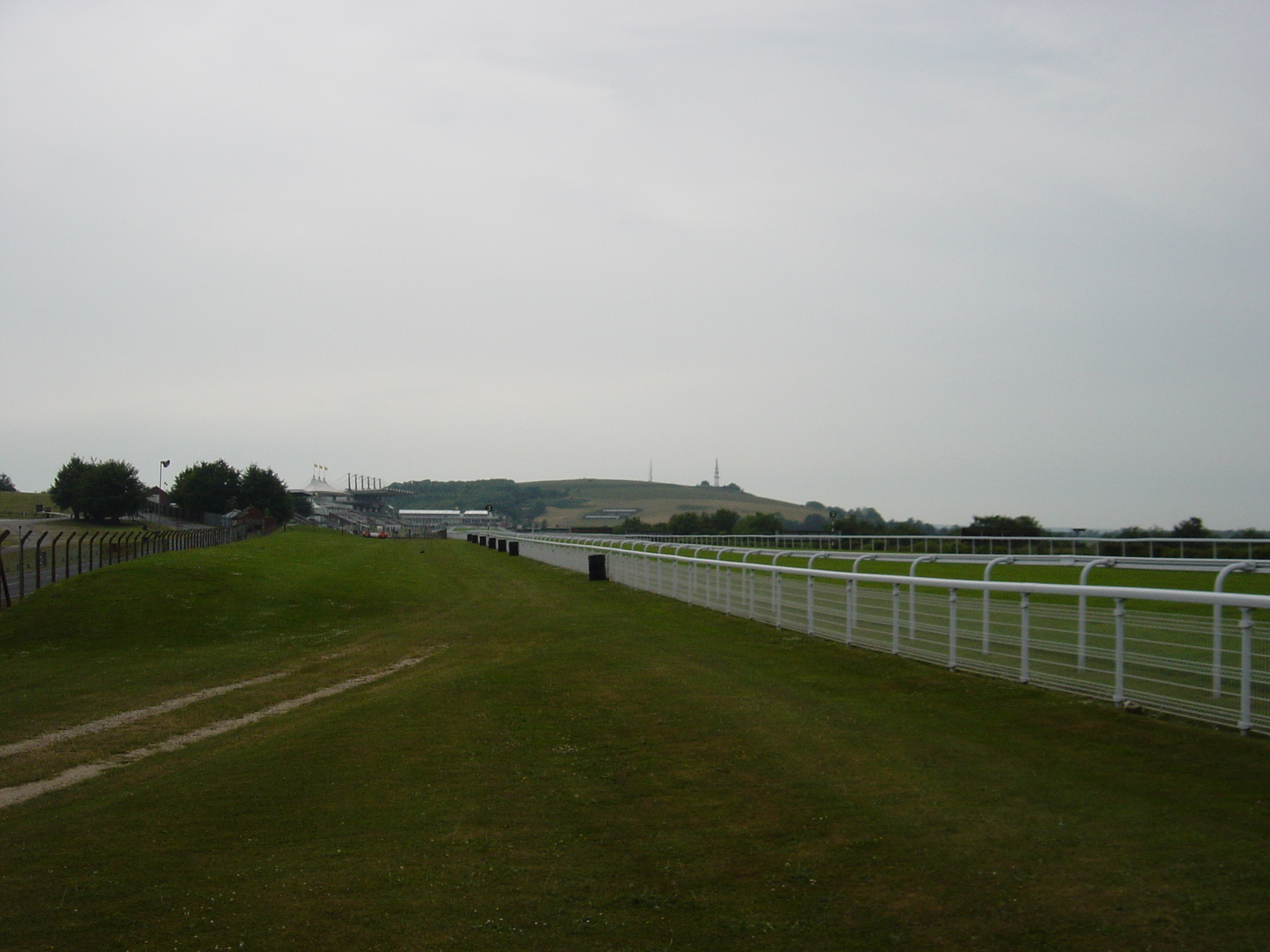
View past the main stand

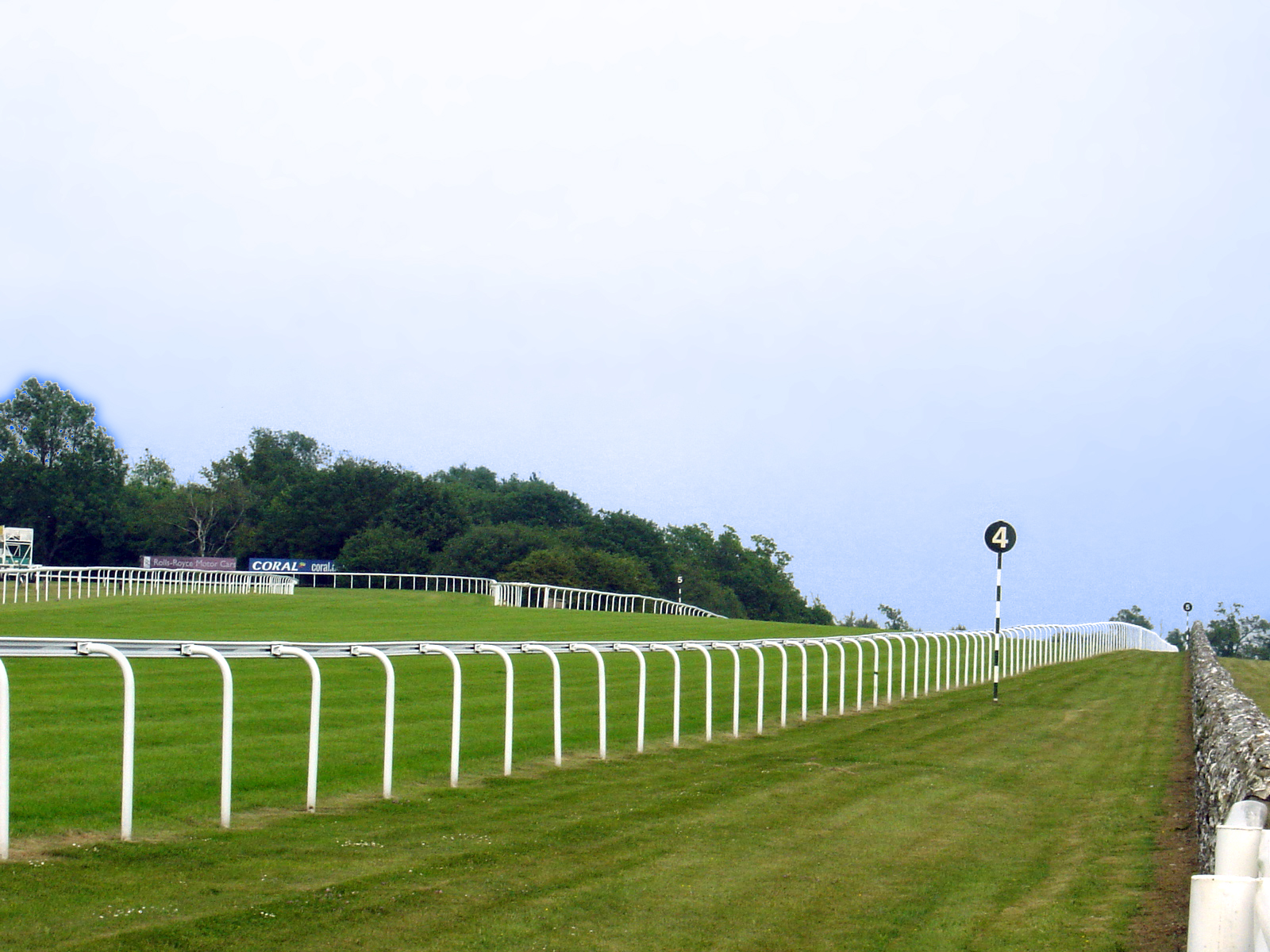
The racecourse

Goodwood Racecourse is a horse-racing track five miles north of Chichester, West Sussex, in England controlled by the family of the Duke of Richmond, whose seat is nearby Goodwood House. It hosts the annual Glorious Goodwood meeting in late July and early August, which is one of the highlights of the British flat racing calendar, and is home to three of the UK's 36 annual Group 1 flat races, the Sussex Stakes, the Goodwood Cup and the Nassau Stakes. Although the race meeting has become known as 'Glorious Goodwood', it is sponsored by Qatar and officially called the 'Qatar Goodwood Festival'.

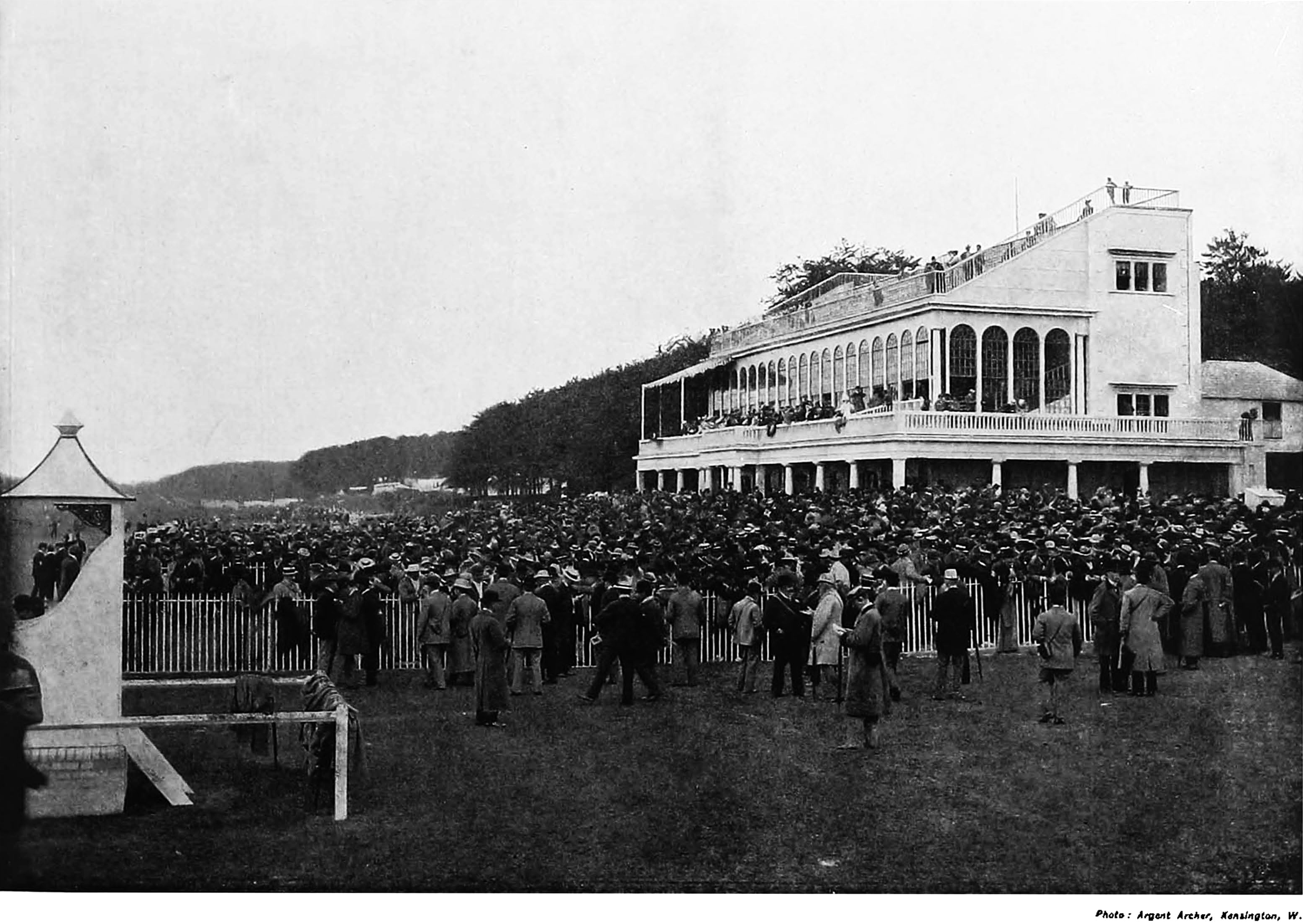
In 1895

It is considered to enjoy an attractive setting to the north of Trundle Iron Age hill fort, which is used as an informal grandstand with views of the whole course. One problem is that its proximity to the coast means that it can get foggy.

This is an unusual, complex racecourse with a straight six furlongs—the "Stewards' Cup Course"—which is uphill for the first furlong and mostly downhill thereafter. There is a tight right-handed loop at the far end of the straight on which there are starts for various longer distance courses. These include the 1 mile 2 furlongs (1m 2f) "Craven Course", the 1m 4f "Gratwicke Course" and the 1m 6f "Bentinck Course". The start for the 2m 5f "Cup Course" is quite close to the winning post—horses travel outwards on the straight, around the loop and back. Throughout the loop there are severe undulations and sharp turns. The course is used for flat racing only.

From 1968 to 1970 the course's late summer meeting was shown on ITV, and from the early 2000s some races from the course occasionally appeared on Channel 4, but otherwise the course had been covered exclusively by the BBC for 50 years from 1956 (when it first appeared on television) to 2006. In 2007 the rights passed to Channel 4 Racing. Since 2017 races have been live on ITV Racing after the channel won the rights to televise horse racing from Channel 4.

In the late 18th century, Goodwood became the location for the first flag start on a British racecourse, at the behest of Lord George Bentinck, after a particularly shambolic start involving jockey Sam Arnull caused by an elderly deaf starter with a speech impediment. Its primary meeting, now known as "Glorious Goodwood", was established in 1802 and the important early handicap the Goodwood Stakes was established in 1823.

== Notable races ==
Month	Meeting	DOW	Race Name	Type	Grade	Distance	Age/sex
May	Spring Meeting	Saturday	Daisy Warwick Stakes	Flat	Listed	1m 4f	4yo + f
May	Spring Meeting	Thursday	Height of Fashion Stakes	Flat	Listed	1m 1f 192y	3yo only f
May	Spring Meeting	Friday	Cocked Hat Stakes	Flat	Listed	1m 3f	3yo only
July–August	Glorious Festival	Tuesday	Molecomb Stakes	Flat	Group 3	5f	2yo only
July–August	Glorious Festival	Tuesday	Lennox Stakes	Flat	Group 2	7f	3yo +
July–August	Glorious Festival	Wednesday	Vintage Stakes	Flat	Group 2	7f	2yo only
July–August	Glorious Festival	Wednesday	Gordon Stakes	Flat	Group 3	1m 4f	3yo only
July–August	Glorious Festival	Wednesday	Sussex Stakes	Flat	Group 1	1m	3yo +
July–August	Glorious Festival	Thursday	Richmond Stakes	Flat	Group 2	6f	2yo only
July–August	Glorious Festival	Thursday	Lillie Langtry Stakes	Flat	Group 2	1m 6f	3yo + f
July–August	Glorious Festival	Thursday	Goodwood Cup	Flat	Group 1	2m	3yo +
July–August	Glorious Festival	Friday	Oak Tree Stakes	Flat	Group 3	7f	3yo + f
July–August	Glorious Festival	Friday	King George Stakes	Flat	Group 2	5f	3yo +
July–August	Glorious Festival	Friday	Thoroughbred Stakes	Flat	Group 3	1m	3yo only
July–August	Glorious Festival	Friday	Glorious Stakes	Flat	Group 3	1m 4f	4yo +
July–August	Glorious Festival	Saturday	Stewards' Cup	Flat	Handicap	6f	3yo +
July–August	Glorious Festival	Saturday	Nassau Stakes	Flat	Group 1	1m 1f 192y	3yo + f
August	August Meeting	Sunday	Celebration Mile	Flat	Group 2	1m	3yo +
August	August Meeting	Sunday	Prestige Stakes	Flat	Group 3	7f	2yo only f
September	Autumn Meeting	Wednesday	Foundation Stakes	Flat	Listed	1m 1f 192y	3yo +
September	Autumn Meeting	Tuesday	Stardom Stakes	Flat	Conditions	7f	2yo only

Other races

- Conqueror Stakes
- Festival Stakes
- On The House Stakes
- Starlit Stakes
- Tapster Stakes
