= Tout Seul =

Irish-bred Thoroughbred racehorse

- Sire: Ali-Royal
- Grandsire: Royal Academy
- Dam: Total Aloof
- Damsire: Groom Dancer
- Sex: Stallion
- Foaled: 4 February 2000
- Country: Ireland
- Colour: Bay
- Breeder: G Johnston King
- Owner: Eden Racing
- Trainer: Fulke Johnson Houghton
- Record: 20: 6-2-1
- Earnings: £386,953

Major wins
- Shergar Cup Juvenile (2002); Tattersalls Breeders Stakes (2002); Dewhurst Stakes (2002); Leicestershire Stakes (2004)

Tout Seul (foaled 4 February 2000) is an Irish-bred, British-trained Thoroughbred racehorse and sire. He is best known for his performances as a two-year-old in 2002 when he won five of his seven races including the Shergar Cup Juvenile, Tattersalls Breeders Stakes and Dewhurst Stakes, as well as finishing second in the Two-Year-Old Trophy. In the following year he failed to win in six races but finished fourth in the 2000 Guineas and third in the Irish 2000 Guineas. In 2004 he recorded his first victory in eighteen months when he won the Leicestershire Stakes but was well beaten in his remaining races and was retired at the end of the year.

== Background ==
Tout Seul is a bay horse with no white markings bred in Ireland by G. Johnston King. As a foal he was offered for sale at Goffs in November 2000 and was bought for IR£6,800 by the bloodstock agent Sheena Collins. As a yearling in September 2001 at Tattersalls Tout Seul was again put up for auction and was bought for 12,500 guineas by the trainer Fulke Johnson Houghton. The colt entered the ownership of the Eden Racing syndicate and was trained throughout his racing career by Johnson Houghton at Woodway stable at Blewbury in Berkshire. He was ridden in most of his races by Steve Carson.

Tout Seul was probably the best horse sired by Ali-Royal, a consistent, top-class miler who won the Sussex Stakes as a four-year-old in 1997. Tout Seul's dam Total Aloof won two minor races as a three-year-old in 1996. and was a granddaughter of the Yorkshire Oaks winner Condessa. The Racing Post's breeding correspondent Tony Morris wrote that the colt was "unfashionably bred" and that Tout Seul was "better than he could have been predicted to be, based on our knowledge of his immediate antecedents".

== Racing career ==
=== 2002: two-year-old season ===
Tout Seul began his racing career in a six furlong maiden race at Chepstow Racecourse on 6 June. Starting a 14/1 outsider in a ten-runner field he took the lead in the final furlong and drew away to in by three lengths from Graduation Day. Eight days later, in a novice race (for horses with no more than one previous win) over the same course and distance he started 5/2 favourite and won by a length from the filly Elidore, to whom he was conceding nine pounds in weight. The colt then ran on 27 June at Salisbury Racecourse in an auction race (a contest in which the weights carried by the horses are determined by the median price of their sire's offspring at auction) and finished second of the seven runners behind Cosmo. In the Shergar Cup, an international jockeys' challenge series run at Ascot Racecourse Tout Seul started 9/2 favourite for the Juvenile race which was run under auction race rules. Ridden by Kieren Fallon he was restrained at the rear of the field before taking the lead approaching the final furlong and won by two and a half lengths. Tout Seul was then sent to Ireland for the Tattersalls Breeders Stakes (a race restricted to two-years-olds sold at Tattersalls) over six furlongs at the Curragh on 24 August. With Carson back in the saddle he started 3/1 favourite in a 25-runner field and won by one and a half lengths from Cosmo after taking the lead a furlong out.

Tout Seul was moved up to Listed class for the Two-Year-Old Trophy over six furlongs at Redcar Racecourse on 5 October and started second favourite behind Monsieur Bond in an eighteen runner field. After racing down the centre of the track he was switched right by Carson and began to make progress in the last quarter mile but failed by a head to overhaul Somnus. Two weeks later the colt was stepped up to Group for Britain's most prestigious race for two-year-olds, the Dewhurst Stakes over seve furlongs at Newmarket Racecourse. The Roger Charlton-trained Trade Fair started favourite despite his only win having come in a maiden, whilst Tout Seul was a 25/1 outsider. The other fourteen runners included Tomahawk (runner-up in the Middle Park Stakes), Al Jadeed (Royal Lodge Stakes), Rimrod (Stardom Stakes), Zafeen, Indian Haven, Dublin (Vintage Stakes), Governor Brown (Somerville Tattersall Stakes), Mario Marini (Marble Hill Stakes), Ontario (Anglesey Stakes) and Saturn (Haynes, Hanson and Clark Conditions Stakes). Carson restrained the colt in the early stages before making ground along the stands-side rail in the last quarter mile. He took the lead 50 yards from the finish and won by one and a quarter lengths from Tomahawk with Trade Fair taking third ahead of Zafeen and Saturn. Fulke Johnson Houghton, who had last won the race with Ribofilio in 1968 said "It's a long time since then, isn't it? But didn't this fellow do it well? He's never been a flashy worker at home, so it's been difficult to know just how good he is, but he's always had a lovely turn of foot. Isn't he just a grand little horse?" Steve Carson, who was winning his first Group One race said "It's definitely the best feeling! It all went pretty smoothly for me. I jumped him out and got him a lead but I was a bit further back than I wanted to be. Two furlongs out I was struggling but he picked up and quickened past them and I just put him on the rail because he runs about a bit in front. He's the best I've ever sat on."

=== 2003: three-year-old season ===
On his three-year-old debut, Tout Seul started at odds of 7/1 for the 2000 Guineas over the Rowley Mile on 3 May. He briefly took the lead inside the last furlong but was overtaken in the final strides and finished fourth behind Refuse To Bend, Zafeen and Norse Dancer. In the Irish 2000 Guineas at the Curragh three weeks later he kept on in the last quarter mile without ever looking likely to win and finished third behind Indian Haven. In the St James's Palace Stakes at Royal Ascot in June he made no impact and finished seventh behind Zafeen. Tout Seul embarked on an international campaign in the autumn of 2003 but had little success. He finished sixth behind Special Kaldoun in the Prix Daniel Wildenstein at Longchamp Racecourse before being sent to Japan where he was unplaced behind Durandal in the Mile Championship. He ended his season in the Listed Capital Stakes over 1600 metres at Tokyo Racecourse on 30 November and came home fifth of the twelve runners behind Siberian Hawk. He was ridden by Fallon in both of his Japanese races.

=== 2004: four-year-old season ===
Tout Seul began his third campaign in the Listed Leicestershire Stakes over seven furlongs at Leicester Racecourse on 24 April. He started the 7/2 second favourite behind the Park Stakes winner Polar Ben, whilst the other nine runners included Makhlab (Horris Hill Stakes) and the veteran sprinter Bahamian Pirate. After tracking the leaders, Carson produced Tout Seul with a strong late run to take the lead inside the final furlong and win by one and three quarter lengths from Polar Ben.

Tout Seul failed to show his best form in six subsequent races. He finished last in both the Lockinge Stakes at Newbury in May and the John of Gaunt Stakes at Haydock Park in June. He ran sixth behind Trade Fair in the Minstrel Stakes at the Curragh in July and tenth behind Norse Dancer in the Sovereign Stakes at Salisbury in August. In October at Newmarket he finished fourth in both the Joel Stakes (behind Polar Ben) and the Ben Marshall Stakes.

== Assessment ==
In the ratings for British two-year-olds of 2002 Tout Seaul was rated second behind Oasis Dream.

== Stud record ==
Tout Seul was retired from racing to become a breeding stallion at the Tenuta della Calandrina near Rome in a deal arranged by McKeever St Lawrence and Federico Barberini. With the best of his offspring being the Listed winner Rivertime.

== Pedigree ==
Pedigree of Tout Seul (IRE), bay stallion, 2000
Sire Ali-Royal (IRE) 1993	Royal Academy (USA); 1987	Nijinsky	Northern Dancer
Sire Ali-Royal (IRE) 1993	Royal Academy (USA); 1987	Nijinsky	Flaming Page
Sire Ali-Royal (IRE) 1993	Royal Academy (USA); 1987	Crimson Saint	Crimson Satan
Sire Ali-Royal (IRE) 1993	Royal Academy (USA); 1987	Crimson Saint	Bolero Rose
Sire Ali-Royal (IRE) 1993	Alidiva (IRE); 1987	Chief Singer	Ballad Rock
Sire Ali-Royal (IRE) 1993	Alidiva (IRE); 1987	Chief Singer	Principia
Sire Ali-Royal (IRE) 1993	Alidiva (IRE); 1987	Alligatrix	Alleged
Sire Ali-Royal (IRE) 1993	Alidiva (IRE); 1987	Alligatrix	Shore
Dam Total Aloof (GB) 1993	Groom Dancer (USA); 1984	Blushing Groom	Red God
Dam Total Aloof (GB) 1993	Groom Dancer (USA); 1984	Blushing Groom	Runaway Bride
Dam Total Aloof (GB) 1993	Groom Dancer (USA); 1984	Featherhill	Lyphard
Dam Total Aloof (GB) 1993	Groom Dancer (USA); 1984	Featherhill	Lady Berry
Dam Total Aloof (GB) 1993	Bashoosh (USA); 1988	Danzig	Northern Dancer
Dam Total Aloof (GB) 1993	Bashoosh (USA); 1988	Danzig	Pas de Nom
Dam Total Aloof (GB) 1993	Bashoosh (USA); 1988	Condessa	Condorcet
Dam Total Aloof (GB) 1993	Bashoosh (USA); 1988	Condessa	Varinessa (Family: 5-h)

- Tout Seul is inbred 4 × 4 to Northern Dancer, meaning that thi stallion appears twice in the fourth generation of his pedigree.
