= Ali-Royal =

Irish-bred Thoroughbred racehorse

- Sire: Royal Academy
- Grandsire: Nijinsky
- Dam: Alidiva
- Damsire: Chief Singer
- Sex: Stallion
- Foaled: 9 February 1993
- Country: Ireland
- Colour: Bay
- Breeder: Charles H. Wacker III
- Owner: Greenbay Stable Ltd
- Trainer: Henry Cecil
- Record: 16: 7-3-3
- Earnings: £202,529

Major wins
- King Charles II Stakes (1996); Ben Marshall Stakes (1996); Earl of Sefton Stakes (1997); Sussex Stakes (1997)

Awards
- Timeform rating 127 (1997)

Ali-Royal (9 February 1993 – January 2001) was an Irish-bred, British-trained Thoroughbred racehorse and sire. After winning one race as a two-year-old in 1995 he showed consistently good form as a three-year-old, winning the King Charles II Stakes and the Ben Marshall Stakes, but appeared to be just below top class. He reached his peak as a four-year-old in 1997, winning the Earl of Sefton Stakes on his seasonal debut and recording his biggest win in the Sussex Stakes on his final racecourse appearance. He retired with a record of seven wins and six places from sixteen starts. He stood as a breeding stallion in Ireland and Australia before dying in 2001 at the age of eight.

== Background ==
Ali-Royal was a "leggy, workmanlike" bay horse with a white star and white markings on both of his hind feet, bred at the Coolmore Stud in County Tipperary by Charles H. Wacker III. His sire, Royal Academy won the July Cup at Newmarket and the Breeders' Cup Mile in 1990. At stud, his best winners included the double Irish St. Leger winner Oscar Schindler and the Hong Kong champion Bullish Luck. Ali-Royal's dam, Alidiva, who was probably the best horse sired by Chief Singer, won at Listed level and was a half-sister to the Prix d'Ispahan winner Croco Rouge. Alidiva became a very successful broodmare, producing the Group One winners Taipan (Preis von Europa, Premio Roma) and Ali-Royal's full-sister Sleepytime. As a descendant of the broodmare Bourtai, Alidiva came from the same branch of Thoroughbred family 9-f which produced Big Spruce and Coastal.

During his racing career, Ali-Royal carried the colours of Wacker's Greenbay Stables and was trained by Henry Cecil at the Warren Place Stable in Newmarket, Suffolk.

== Racing career ==
=== 1995: two-year-old season ===
On his racecourse debut, Ali-Royal started 5/2 favourite for a seven furlong maiden race at Great Yarmouth Racecourse on 13 September and finished fourth behind the Godolphin runner Shawanni. Three weeks later the colt recorded his first victory in a similar event at Warwick Racecourse, leading for most of the way and winning by four lengths from sixteen opponents.

=== 1996: three-year-old season ===
Ali-Royal ran nine times as a three-year-old in 1996, starting with a third place behind Ramooz and Bahamian Knight in the Classic Trial at Thirsk Racecourse on 20 April. At Newmarket Racecourse on 17 May he started third favourite behind the Free Handicap runner-up Projection and the Chesham Stakes winner World Premier in the Listed King Charles II Stakes over seven furlongs. Ridden by Willie Ryan, he went to the front two furlongs out and drew away from his rivals to win "easily" by eight lengths.

At Royal Ascot in June, Ali-Royal was stepped up in class for the Group Three Jersey Stakes but finished fifth to Lucayan Prince after Ryan had struggled to obtain a clear run in the last quarter mile. Despite his defeat, the colt was moved up to the highest class and matched against older horses in the Group One Sussex Stakes at Goodwood Racecourse in July, but never looked likely to win and finished seventh of the ten runners behind the four-year-old First Island. In August at York he was dropped in class and started favourite for the Listed City of York Stakes but was beaten a length into second by the Barry Hills-trained filly Ruznama.

In September, Ali-Royal was again the beaten favourite when he finished second to the Godolphin colt Kammtarra in a minor race at Doncaster Racecourse. At the end of the month the colt returned to the winner's circle when he started favourite for a minor event over one mile at Bath Racecourse. Ridden by the veteran Pat Eddery, he took the lead approaching the last quarter mile and went clear of the field to win by twelve lengths from the five-year-old Nijo. On his final appearance of the year, Ali-Royal contested the Listed Ben Marshall Stakes over one mile at Newmarket on 2 November, and started 9/4 favourite ahead of Fatefully (Rosemary Stakes) and Centre Stalls (Fortune Stakes). After tracking the leaders, Ali-Royal took the lead approaching the final furlong and won by one and a quarter lengths from Nijo and Fatefully.

=== 1997: four-year-old season ===
Kieren Fallon took over took over as Ali-Royal's regular jockey in 1997 and rode the colt in all six of his races. On his seasonal debut he started 11/4 favourite for the Group Three Earl of Sefton Stakes over eight and a half furlongs at Newmarket in April. After being restrained by Fallon in the early stages he took the lead a furlong and a half from the finish and won by two lengths and a head from Wixim and Amrak Ajeeb. Ten days later he was moved up in distance for the ten furlong Gordon Richards Stakes at Sandown Park Racecourse and finished third behind Sasuru and Multicoloured. In the Group One Lockinge Stakes at Newbury Racecourse in May he took the lead three furlongs out but was overtaken in the closing stages and finished second, one and a half lengths behind First Island.

At Royal Ascot in June Ali-Royal started 9/4 favourite for the Queen Anne Stakes which was then a Group Two race. After struggling to obtain a clear run and then stumbling when Fallon switched him to the outside he finished third, beaten a neck and one and a quarter lengths by Allied Forces and Centre Stalls. The colt next appeared in a minor race at York in July and started second favourite behind the Jersey Stakes runner-up Kahal. Fallon tracked the leaders before sending Ali-Royal into the lead a furlong out to win by one and a half lengths from Weet-A-Minute. Fallon reportedly said that the colt "won as he liked".

On 30 July, Ali-Royal was one of nine horses to contest the Sussex Stakes at Goodwood. The three-year-old Starborough started favourite ahead of Allied Forces and Among Men with Ali-Royal next in the betting on 13/2. The other runners included Air Express (Premio Parioli, Mehl-Mülhens-Rennen), Alhaarth, Gothenburg (Premio Emilio Turati) and Classic Park (Irish 1,000 Guineas). In the early stages, Ali-Royal was held up towards the rear of the field as Starborough set the pace before. Fallon switched the colt to the outside in the straight and made steady progress, taking the lead a furlong out and winning by three quarters of a length from Starborough. Allied Forces took third place ahead of Among Men and Classic Park.

== Stud record ==
Ali-Royal was retired from racing to become a breeding stallion at the Coolmore's Castlehyde Stud in Tipperary and was also shuttled to stand in Australia for the Southern hemisphere breeding season. He was initially very popular with breeders, and covered 122 mares in his first season at stud. By far the best of his offspring on the flat was Tout Seul who won the Dewhurst Stakes in 2002. He also sired the steeplechaser Howle Hill, the winner of the Amlin 1965 Chase. In January 2001, while standing at the Lynden Park Stud in Victoria, he developed severe laminitis and was euthanised at the Randwick Equine Clinic.

== Pedigree ==
Pedigree of Ali-Royal (IRE), bay horse, 1993
Sire Royal Academy (USA) 1987	Nijinsky (CAN); 1967	Northern Dancer	Nearctic
Sire Royal Academy (USA) 1987	Nijinsky (CAN); 1967	Northern Dancer	Natalma
Sire Royal Academy (USA) 1987	Nijinsky (CAN); 1967	Flaming Page	Bull Page
Sire Royal Academy (USA) 1987	Nijinsky (CAN); 1967	Flaming Page	Flaring Top
Sire Royal Academy (USA) 1987	Crimson Saint (USA); 1969	Crimson Satan	Spy Song
Sire Royal Academy (USA) 1987	Crimson Saint (USA); 1969	Crimson Satan	Papila
Sire Royal Academy (USA) 1987	Crimson Saint (USA); 1969	Bolero Rose	Bolero
Sire Royal Academy (USA) 1987	Crimson Saint (USA); 1969	Bolero Rose	First Rose
Dam Alidiva (IRE) 1987	Chief Singer (IRE); 1981	Ballad Rock	Bold Lad
Dam Alidiva (IRE) 1987	Chief Singer (IRE); 1981	Ballad Rock	True Rocket
Dam Alidiva (IRE) 1987	Chief Singer (IRE); 1981	Principia	Le Fabuleux
Dam Alidiva (IRE) 1987	Chief Singer (IRE); 1981	Principia	Pia
Dam Alidiva (IRE) 1987	Alligatrix (USA); 1980	Alleged	Hoist the Flag
Dam Alidiva (IRE) 1987	Alligatrix (USA); 1980	Alleged	Princess Pout
Dam Alidiva (IRE) 1987	Alligatrix (USA); 1980	Shore	Round Table
Dam Alidiva (IRE) 1987	Alligatrix (USA); 1980	Shore	Delta (Family: 9-f)
