= Chief Singer =

Irish-bred Thoroughbred racehorse and sire (1971–2000)

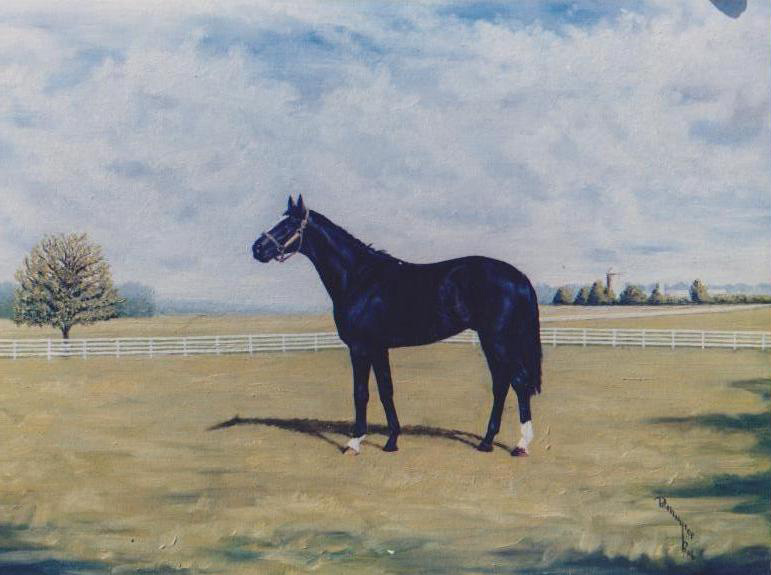
- Chief Singer, painted by Bob Demuyser oil on canvas
- Sire: Ballad Rock
- Grandsire: Bold Lad (IRE)
- Dam: Principia
- Damsire: Le Fabuleux
- Sex: Stallion
- Foaled: 19 March 1981
- Country: Ireland
- Colour: Brown
- Owner: Jeff Smith
- Trainer: Ron Sheather
- Record: 9: 4–2–1

Major wins
- Coventry Stakes (1983); St. James's Palace Stakes (1984); July Cup (1984); Sussex Stakes (1984)

Awards
- Gilbey champion racehorse of Europe (1984); Timeform top-rated sprinter (1984); Top-rated British three-year-old (1984); Timeform rating: 131
- Last updated on 1 August 2024

Chief Singer (19 March 1981 – 2000) was an Irish-bred, British-trained Thoroughbred racehorse and sire. In a racing career which lasted from June 1983 until September 1984 he ran nine times and won four races. The colt won the Group Three Coventry Stakes at Royal Ascot on his racecourse debut but ran disappointingly in his only other race as a two-year-old. As a three-year-old he finished second to El Gran Senor in the 2000 Guineas at Newmarket Racecourse and then completed a rare hat-trick of wins by taking the St. James's Palace Stakes at Ascot, the July Cup at Newmarket and the Sussex Stakes at Goodwood. At the end of that season he retired to stud where he had limited success as a sire of winners.

== Background ==
Chief Singer was a dark brown, almost black horse standing 16.3 hands high with a white blaze and two white feet. He was the best horse sired by Ballad Rock, an Irish sprinter whose best win came in the Greenlands Stakes. At stud, Ballad Rock suffered from health problems which limited his fertility: Chief Singer was one of only ten foals he sired in 1981. His dam, Principia, was a minor winner in France and a daughter of the 1967 Epsom Oaks winner Pia.

As a yearling Chief Singer was sent to the sales. His unusual size did not appeal to prospective owners and he was bought for the relatively low price of 10,000 guineas by Jeff Smith. The colt was sent into training with the former jockey Ron Sheather at his Park Lodge stable in Newmarket, Suffolk. Chief Singer was the first major winner for his regular jockey Ray Cochrane.

== Racing career ==
=== 1983: two-year-old season ===
Chief Singer never ran in a maiden race and was unusual in that his entire career was spent in Group Race company. On his first racecourse appearance he was sent to Royal Ascot in June where he ran in the six furlong Coventry Stakes. Shortly before the race, Sheather had matched the colt against a successful six-year-old handicapper named Teamwork in a trial gallop, and decided to send the colt straight to Ascot after he easily defeated his older rival despite meeting him at two stones worse than weight-for-age. In the Coventry Stakes, Chief Singer started a 20/1 outsider in a field of fourteen runners. Before the race Lester Piggott asked Cochrane how he expected to win on "that big black oaf". Cochrane responded "take a good look at his face, because all you're going to see at the end is his arse". Chief Singer started poorly and was left behind by his opponents but made up the lost ground, took the lead entering the final furlong, and drew away to win by four lengths. Timeform praised his "extraordinary turn of foot" and called his victory a "scintillating display". After the race, Jeff Smith reportedly received many large offers for the colt, but refused to sell.

A month later, Chief Singer started favourite for the July Stakes at Newmarket. He pulled hard on the way to the start and fought his jockey's attempts to restrain him during the race before finishing fifth of the six runners behind Superlative. After the race, Chief Singer's performances in training deteriorated sharply, with Shearer reporting that the horse seemed unable to even canter. A succession of veterinary examinations failed to find any physical explanation and the colt did not race again in 1983.

=== 1984: three-year-old season ===
On his first run as a three-year-old, Chief Singer was sent to contest the Group Three 2000 Guineas Trial Stakes over seven furlongs at Salisbury Racecourse in April. Running for the first time in more than nine months he finished second of the seventeen runners beaten a length by Rousillon who was carrying five pounds less. In May Chief Singer started a 20/1 outsider in a field of nine for the 2000 Guineas at Newmarket, with El Gran Senor being made the 15/8 favourite ahead of Lear Fan, Keen and Rainbow Quest in what was considered an unusually strong running of the classic. After being last in the early stages he moved forward to take the lead approaching the final furlong but was immediately challenged by El Gran Senor. The two colts quickly drew away from the rest of the field, with the favourite prevailing by 1 1/2 lengths and Chief Singer finishing four lengths clear of Lear Fan in third.

In June, a year after his last win, Chief Singer returned to Royal Ascot for the St James's Palace Stakes (then a Group Two race) over one mile. Starting the 85/40 favourite, Chief Singer again started slowly but moved up to fourth place entering the straight. Cochrane sent him into the lead two furlongs out and the colt accelerated clear of the field to win by eight lengths from Keen and Kalim in a track record time of 1:38.90. On his next appearance, Chief Singer ran in the July Cup, at that time the only all-aged Group One race in Europe over six furlongs, in which his opposition included the leading sprinters Habibti, Committed and Never So Bold. Cochrane and Chief Singer were towards the rear of the field for the first half of the race before accelerating through a gap to take the lead a furlong from the finish. He won by 1 1/2 lengths from Never So Bold, with Committed third and Habibti sixth. Only four horses appeared to oppose Chief Singer at Goodwood in early August when he attempted to become the second horse, after the Irish-trained Thatch in 1973 to win the one mile Sussex Stakes after winning the St James's Palace Stakes and the July Cup. The race developed into a struggle between Chief Singer and Rousillon, the horse who had beaten him at Salisbury. The closing stages were unusually rough, with Rousillon hanging to the right and bumping his rival several times, as Cochrane tried to challenge on the inside rail. Cochrane had to resort to the whip to get the favourite to the post half a length ahead of his rival, with the pair finishing seven lengths clear of the rest. After an enquiry by the racecourse stewards, Rousillon was disqualified from second and placed last with his jockey Greville Starkey, being found guilty of "reckless riding".

Sheather then moved Chief Singer up in distance for the Benson & Hedges Gold Cup over 10 1/2 furlongs at York. The colt failed to reproduce his best form as he finished third behind the four-year-olds Cormorant Wood and Tolomeo, one place ahead of Sadler's Wells. His apparent failure to stay led to plans to run him in the Champion Stakes being abandoned and he next appeared in the Queen Elizabeth II Stakes over one mile at Ascot in late September. Chief Singer bolted on the way to the start and it took Cochrane some time to bring the horse under control. When the race began he was left behind at the start and was never in contention at any stage, finishing tailed-off in last place behind Teleprompter. He was then retired to stud with a valuation of £4.8 million.

== Assessment ==
In the official International Classification for 1983, Chief Singer was given a rating of 75, thirteen pounds below the top-rated two-year-old El Gran Senor.

In 1984, his rating of 92 was the highest for any British three-year-old and the fourth highest for any European horse behind El Gran Senor (98), Teenoso (95) and Sagace (93). In the same year he was given a rating of 131 by the independent Timeform organisation, making him their top-rated sprint horse. He was also the winner of the Gilbey European Champion Racehorse award, based on points accrued by performances in major races during the season.

== Stud record ==
Chief Singer stood as a stallion at the Side Hill stud at Newmarket and was later exported to stand at the Hauptgestut Graditz in Germany where he died in 2000. The best of his offspring were the Listed flat race winner Alidiva and the successful National Hunt performer Chief's Song. Alidiva, however, proved to be an exceptional broodmare, producing the Group One winners Sleepytime, Taipan (Preis von Europa, Premio Roma) and Ali-Royal.

== Pedigree ==
Pedigree of Chief Singer (IRE), brown stallion, 1981
Sire Ballad Rock (GB) 1974	Bold Lad (IRE); 1964	Bold Ruler	Nasrullah
Sire Ballad Rock (GB) 1974	Bold Lad (IRE); 1964	Bold Ruler	Miss Disco
Sire Ballad Rock (GB) 1974	Bold Lad (IRE); 1964	Barn Pride	Democratic
Sire Ballad Rock (GB) 1974	Bold Lad (IRE); 1964	Barn Pride	Fair Alycia
Sire Ballad Rock (GB) 1974	True Rocket; 1967	Roan Rocket	Buisson Ardent
Sire Ballad Rock (GB) 1974	True Rocket; 1967	Roan Rocket	Farandole
Sire Ballad Rock (GB) 1974	True Rocket; 1967	True Course	Hill Gail
Sire Ballad Rock (GB) 1974	True Rocket; 1967	True Course	Arctic Rullah
Dam Principia (FR) 1970	Le Fabuleux; 1961	Wild Risk	Rialto
Dam Principia (FR) 1970	Le Fabuleux; 1961	Wild Risk	Wild Violet
Dam Principia (FR) 1970	Le Fabuleux; 1961	Anguar	Verso
Dam Principia (FR) 1970	Le Fabuleux; 1961	Anguar	La Rochelle
Dam Principia (FR) 1970	Pia; 1964	Darius	Dante
Dam Principia (FR) 1970	Pia; 1964	Darius	Yasna
Dam Principia (FR) 1970	Pia; 1964	Peseta	Neckar
Dam Principia (FR) 1970	Pia; 1964	Peseta	Prompt Payment (Family: 16-a)
