= Classic Park (horse) =

British-bred Thoroughbred racehorse

- Sire: Robellino
- Grandsire: Roberto
- Dam: Wanton
- Damsire: Kris
- Sex: Mare
- Foaled: 13 April 1994
- Country: United Kingdom
- Colour: Bay
- Breeder: Lady Halifax
- Owner: Mrs Seamus Burns (Patricia)
- Trainer: Aidan O'Brien
- Record: 14: 3-2-1
- Earnings: £118,502

Major wins
- Leopardstown 1000 Guineas Trial (1997); Irish 1,000 Guineas (1997)

Classic Park (foaled 13 April 1994) was a British-bred, Irish-trained Thoroughbred racehorse and broodmare. After winning on her racecourse debut she was beaten in her other seven races as a two-year-old although she was placed in the Marble Hill Stakes, Silver Flash Stakes and Round Tower Stakes. In the following spring she won the Leopardstown 1000 Guineas Trial before recording her biggest success when taking the Irish 1,000 Guineas as a 20/1 outsider. She thus became the first Classic race winner trained by Aidan O'Brien. Classic Park did not win again despite running well in important races over one mile and was retired at the end of the year. As a broodmare she was best known as the dam of Walk In The Park who finished second in The Derby and became a successful National Hunt sire.

== Background ==
Classic Park was a bay mare bred in England by Lady Halifax. As a yearling in October 1995 the filly was consigned to the Tattersalls sale at Newmarket and was bought for 30,000 guineas by Emerald Bloodstock. She entered the ownership of Seamus Burns' County Kilkenny-based White Lodge Stud competed during her racing career in the colours of Burns' wife Patricia. Burns later commented "I just saw her in the sale-ring and liked her, and bought her on a hunch". She was sent into training with Aidan O'Brien who had just begun his career at Ballydoyle.

She was sired by Robellino, a son of Roberto, who won the Royal Lodge Stakes in 1980. At stud Robellino sired several good winners over a wide variety of distances including Mister Baileys, Royal Rebel and Rebelline (Tattersalls Gold Cup). Classic Park's dam Wanton showed good form as a two-year-old, winning one race and finishing third in the Flying Childers Stakes. Apart from Classic Park, she also produced the Diana Stakes winner Rumpipumpy and was a half-sister to Easy Option, the dam of Court Masterpiece.

== Racing career ==
=== 1996: two-year-old season ===
Classic Park began her racing career in a five furlong maiden race at the Curragh on 13 April and won by three and a half lengths at odds of 5/1. She was moved up in class for the Listed Marble Hill Stakes over the same course and distance in May and finished third of the seven runners behind Raphane. Nine days later Leopardstown Racecourse she was moved up in distance for the six furlong Silver Flash Stakes and finished runner-up to the Jim Bolger-trained Azra. On 19 June she was sent to Royal Ascot and finished sixth behind Dance Parade in the Group Three Queen Mary Stakes. Four weeks later in the Curragh Stakes she finished fourth behind Raphane after disputing the lead in the early stages. After a late summer break the filly returned in the Round Tower Stakes at the Curragh on 8 September and finished second, beaten a head by the Dermot Weld-trained Desert Ease. She showed little form in her two remaining races, finishing unplaced in both the Listed Blenheim Stakes at the Curragh on 5 October and the Two-Year-Old Trophy at Redcar Racecourse twelve days later.

=== 1997: three-year-old season ===
On 19 April 1997 Classic Park began her second season in the Leopardstown 1,000 Guineas Trial Stakes in which she was ridden for the first time by Stephen Craine and started a 14/1 outsider in an eight-runner field. Her stablemate Shell Ginger (winner of the Killavullan Stakes) started favourite ahead of Token Gesture (C L Weld Park Stakes), Azra and the John Oxx-trained Chania. After starting slowly she was still in last place on the final turn but began to make progress on the outside in the straight. She moved into third place approaching the final furlong, caught Chania in final stride and won by a short head.

Craine was again in the saddle when Classic Park was stepped up to Group One class for the Irish 1000 Guineas over one mile at the Curragh on 24 May and was made a 20/1 shot against nine opponents. The race featured a strong British challenge comprising Ryafan (the Prix Marcel Boussac winner and 3/1 favourite), Oh Nellie (runner-up in the 1000 Guineas), Seebe (Princess Margaret Stakes) and Dazzle (Cherry Hinton Stakes). The best fancied of the Irish runner was the O'Brien-trained Strawberry Roan, the winner of the Derrinstown Stud 1,000 Guineas Trial and the selection of the stable jockey Christy Roche. After racing towards the rear of the field as Oh Nellie set the pace Classic Park began to make progress on the inside in the straight and went to the front a furlong from the finish. She broke clear of her rivals and held off the challenge of Strawberry Roan to win by a length. After training the longest priced winner in the history of the race Aidan O'Brien commented "Looking back on her two-year-old career, we probably took the wrong road by confining her to five and six furlongs. She finished really well to take her trial at Leopardstown, and it was the same tactics here – hold her up as long as possible. She quickened very well when Stephen asked and won on merit".

Classic Park was matched against the English 1000 Guineas winner Sleepytime in the Coronation Stakes at Royal Ascot on 19 June. After being held up at the rear as usual she made some progress but never looked likely to win and finished fourth of the six runners behind Rebecca Sharp. She faced male opposition for the first time in 1997 when she returned to Britain for the Sussex Stakes at Goodwood Racecourse in July and finished fifth of the nine runners behind the four-year-old colt Ali-Royal with Air Express and Alhaarth finishing behind her. On her next appearance the filly was sent to France and started a 54/1 outsider for a very strong renewal of the Prix du Moulin over 1600 metres at Longchamp Racecourse in September. She finished fifth behind Spinning World, Helissio, Daylami and Daneskaya with Rebecca Sharp in seventh and Bijou d'Inde in eighth. Classic Park returned to Longchamp on 19 October for the Prix de la Forêt over 1400 metres but ran poorly and finished last of the ten runners behind Occupandiste.

== Breeding record ==
At the end of 1997 Classic Park was retired to become a broodmare for the White Lodge Stud. She produced at least ten foals and six winners.

- Cool Storm, a bay filly, foaled in 1999, sired by Rainbow Quest. Unplaced on only start. Dam of winners.
- Park Crystal, bay filly, 2000, by Danehill. Unraced.
- Mufradat, bay filly, 2001, by Desert Prince. Won two races.
- Walk In The Park, bay colt, 2002, by Montjeu. Second in The Derby. Sire of Douvan.
- Secret World, chestnut colt (later gelded), 2003, by Spinning World. Won one race.
- Hallowed Park, bay filly, 2004, by Barathea. Unraced. Dam of winners.
- Regal Park, bay colt (later gelded), 2007, by Montjeu. Won four races.
- Puzzled, chestnut filly, 2008, by Peintre Celebre. Failed to win in ten races.
- Soon, bay filly, 2009, by Galileo. Won two races including the Ruby Stakes.
- Shama's Crown, chestnut filly, 2011, by New Approach. Won one race.

== Pedigree ==
Pedigree of Classic Park (GB), bay mare, 1994
Sire Robellino (USA) 1978	Roberto (USA); 1969	Hail to Reason	Turn-To
Sire Robellino (USA) 1978	Roberto (USA); 1969	Hail to Reason	Nothirdchance
Sire Robellino (USA) 1978	Roberto (USA); 1969	Bramalea	Nashua
Sire Robellino (USA) 1978	Roberto (USA); 1969	Bramalea	Rarelea
Sire Robellino (USA) 1978	Isobelline (USA); 1971	Pronto	Timor
Sire Robellino (USA) 1978	Isobelline (USA); 1971	Pronto	Proserpina
Sire Robellino (USA) 1978	Isobelline (USA); 1971	Isobella	Bold Ruler
Sire Robellino (USA) 1978	Isobelline (USA); 1971	Isobella	Monarchy
Dam Wanton (GB) 1983	Kris (GB); 1976	Sharpen Up	Atan
Dam Wanton (GB) 1983	Kris (GB); 1976	Sharpen Up	Rocchetta
Dam Wanton (GB) 1983	Kris (GB); 1976	Doubly Sure	Reliance
Dam Wanton (GB) 1983	Kris (GB); 1976	Doubly Sure	Soft Angels
Dam Wanton (GB) 1983	Brazen Faced (GB); 1975	Bold and Free	Bold Lad (IRE)
Dam Wanton (GB) 1983	Brazen Faced (GB); 1975	Bold and Free	Free and Easy
Dam Wanton (GB) 1983	Brazen Faced (GB); 1975	Maurine	Worden
Dam Wanton (GB) 1983	Brazen Faced (GB); 1975	Maurine	Muscida (Family:1-u)
