= Fleet (horse) =

Irish-bred Thoroughbred racehorse

- Sire: Immortality
- Grandsire: Never Say Die
- Dam: Review
- Damsire: Panorama
- Sex: Mare
- Foaled: 1964
- Country: Ireland
- Colour: Bay
- Breeder: Peter FitzGerald
- Owner: R. C. Boucher
- Trainer: Noel Murless
- Record: 9: 5-1-0
- Earnings: £44,426

Major wins
- Princess Margaret Stakes (1966); Cheveley Park Stakes (1966); 1000 Guineas (1967); Coronation Stakes (1967)

Honours
- Top-rated British two-year-old filly (1966)

Fleet (1964 – after 1979), known in the United States as Fleet II, was an Irish-bred, British-trained Thoroughbred racehorse and broodmare who won the classic 1000 Guineas in 1967. In a racing career lasting from June 1966 until July 1967, the filly contested nine races (including one occasion on which she refused to start) and won five times. As a two-year-old in 1966, Fleet won two of her three races including the Cheveley Park Stakes and was the highest rated filly of her age in Britain. In the following year she won three races over a distance of one mile including the 1000 Guineas and the Coronation Stakes. When tried over longer distances she finished fourth in The Oaks and Eclipse Stakes. She was retired to stud where she had some success as a broodmare in Britain and the United States.

== Background ==
Fleet was a bay mare bred in County Limerick, Ireland by Peter FitzGerald. Her sire, Immortality, a British-bred half brother to the Whitney Stakes winner Cohoes, was sent to stud without ever having competed in a race. Shortly after siring Fleet he was sold and exported to Argentina. Fleet's dam, Review, was an outstanding broodmare: her other progeny included Pourparler (1000 Guineas), Democratie (Prix de la Forêt) and Display (Cheveley Park Stakes, Coronation Stakes). Review was a difficult and temperamental mare, who was often sent to be covered by Immortality as he was based near FitzGerald's stud.

As a yearling, Fleet was sent to the sales at Newmarket, where she was sold for 11,000 guineas to Robert Boucher, a fruit and hop grower from Kent whose best-known horse had been the Washington, D.C. International winner Wilwyn. Boucher sent the filly into training with Noel Murless at his Warren Place stable at Newmarket.

== Racing career ==
=== 1966: two-year-old season ===
Fleet began her racing career at Sandown Park in June, when she finished second to Social Bee in a race over five furlongs. In July she was moved up in class and distance or the six furlong Princess Margaret Stakes at Ascot Racecourse. Ridden by Lester Piggott she started the 4/6 favourite and won from Gift Token and Negotiator.

Piggott again took the ride when Fleet ran in the Cheveley Park Stakes, Britain's most prestigious race for two-year-old fillies at Newmarket Racecourse in October. She was restrained by Piggott in the early stages before taking the lead inside the final furlong and won going away by one and a half lengths at odds of 5/2, beating Pia, a filly who had previously won the Cherry Hinton Stakes and Lowther Stakes. In the Free Handicap, an official rating of the best British and Irish juveniles, Fleet was the highest-place filly with a rating of 122 pounds, eleven pounds below the top-rated colt Bold Lad.

=== 1967: three-year-old season ===
Fleet was scheduled to begin her three-year-old season in the Classic Trial over one mile at Thirsk Racecourse in April but she refused to line up for the start (starting stalls were not used at the Yorkshire course) and took no real part in the race, although she did eventually complete the course. At Newmarket she started at odds of 11/2 in a field of sixteen for the 1000 Guineas over the Rowley Mile course. The French-trained filly Fix The Date, winner of the Prix Imprudence, started 11/10 favourite for a race which was run in cold, wet and windy conditions. Ridden by the Australian jockey George Moore she won a closely contested finish by half a length from St Pauli Girl, just ahead of Lacquer and Pia. The win followed the success of Royal Palace, trained by Murless and ridden by Moore, in the 2000 Guineas, giving the trainer and jockey a double which was not repeated for 38 years.

Despite doubts about her stamina, Fleet was allowed to take her place in the Oaks at Epsom a month later and started favourite in a field of twelve. She looked to be travelling strongly early in the straight, but tired in the closing stages to finish fourth behind Pia, St Pauli Girl and Ludham. The filly returned to one mile for the Coronation Stakes at Royal Ascot and won at odds of 5/2 from Royal Saint and Whirled, giving Moore the 2000th victory of his career. Fleet was well-fancied for the Eclipse Stakes at Sandown in July, a race in which she was matched against colts and older horses for the first time. She finished fourth behind her stable companion Busted. On her final start she won the Michael Sobell Stakes over one mile at Ascot.

The successes of Fleet, Busted and Royal Palace enabled Murless to become British flat racing Champion Trainer with record earnings of £256,899.

== Retirement ==
Fleet was retired to her owners stud, but after a year she was sold and exported to the United States. She remained in North America until 1973 when she returned to England. The best of her foals was the Florida-bred filly Heloise (sired by Dr. Fager) who won the Diana Handicap in 1975.

== Assessment and honours ==
In their book, A Century of Champions, based on the Timeform rating system, John Randall and Tony Morris rated Fleet an "average" winner of the 1000 Guineas.

== Pedigree ==
Pedigree of Fleet (IRE), bay mare, 1964
| Sire Immortality (GB) 1956 | Never Say Die; 1951 | Nasrullah | Nearco |
| Sire Immortality (GB) 1956 | Never Say Die; 1951 | Nasrullah | Mumtaz Begum |
| Sire Immortality (GB) 1956 | Never Say Die; 1951 | Singing Grass | War Admiral |
| Sire Immortality (GB) 1956 | Never Say Die; 1951 | Singing Grass | Boreale |
| Sire Immortality (GB) 1956 | Belle of Troy; 1947 | Blue Larkspur | Black Servant |
| Sire Immortality (GB) 1956 | Belle of Troy; 1947 | Blue Larkspur | Blossom Time |
| Sire Immortality (GB) 1956 | Belle of Troy; 1947 | La Troienne | Teddy |
| Sire Immortality (GB) 1956 | Belle of Troy; 1947 | La Troienne | Helene de Troie |
| Dam Review (GB) 1951 | Panorama; 1936 | Sir Cosmo | The Boss |
| Dam Review (GB) 1951 | Panorama; 1936 | Sir Cosmo | Ayn Hali |
| Dam Review (GB) 1951 | Panorama; 1936 | Happy Climax | Happy Warrior |
| Dam Review (GB) 1951 | Panorama; 1936 | Happy Climax | Clio |
| Dam Review (GB) 1951 | Pin Up Girl; 1943 | Coup de Lyon | Winalot |
| Dam Review (GB) 1951 | Pin Up Girl; 1943 | Coup de Lyon | Sundry |
| Dam Review (GB) 1951 | Pin Up Girl; 1943 | Careless | Caerleon |
| Dam Review (GB) 1951 | Pin Up Girl; 1943 | Careless | Traverse (Family:4-p) |
