= Sleepytime =

Irish-bred Thoroughbred racehorse

- Sire: Royal Academy
- Grandsire: Nijinsky
- Dam: Alidiva
- Damsire: Chief Singer
- Sex: Mare
- Foaled: 20 February 1994
- Country: Ireland
- Colour: Bay
- Breeder: C. H. Wacker III
- Owner: Greenbay Stables
- Trainer: Henry Cecil
- Record: 6: 2-0-2
- Earnings: £148,444

Major wins
- 1000 Guineas (1997)

Sleepytime (foaled 20 February 1994) is an Irish-bred, British-trained Thoroughbred racehorse. In a racing career which lasted from September 1996 to April 1998 she ran six times and won two races. In two races as a two-year-old she won one race, and finished third in the Group One Fillies' Mile at Ascot. On her three-year-old debut she was beaten in the Fred Darling Stakes at Newbury but then won the Classic 1000 Guineas at Newmarket Racecourse. On her only subsequent appearance that year she finished third in the Coronation Stakes. After one unsuccessful run in 1998 she was retired from racing to become a successful broodmare.

== Background ==
Sleepytime, a dark-coated bay filly with a white star, was bred by Charles H. Wacker III and raced in the colours of Wacker's Greenbay Stables. As a two-year-old, Sleepytime was described as having a dragster-like physique, with a "slender, delicate front" and "hugely powerful" hind quarters.

Her sire, Royal Academy won the July Cup at Newmarket and the Breeders' Cup Mile in 1990. At stud, his best winners have included the double Irish St. Leger winner Oscar Schindler and the Hong Kong champion Bullish Luck. Sleepytime's dam, Alidiva, who was probably the best horse sired by Chief Singer, won at Listed level and was a half-sister to the Prix d'Ispahan winner Croco Rouge. In addition to Sleepytime produced the Group One winners Taipan (Preis von Europa, Premio Roma) and Ali-Royal (Sussex Stakes). As a descendant of the broodmare Bourtai, Sleepytime and Alidiva came from the same branch of Thoroughbred family 9-f which produced Big Spruce and Coastal.

Sleepytime was trained by Henry Cecil at his Warren Place stables at Newmarket, Suffolk and was ridden in four of her six races by Kieren Fallon.

== Racing career ==
Sleepytime made her racecourse debut in a seven furlong maiden race at Sandown Park in September. Her reputation had already been established by her performances in training and she started at odds of 30/100 against fourteen opponents. Ridden by the veteran Pat Eddery, Sleepytime took the lead two furlongs from the finish and drew away to win by five lengths in what the Racing Post described as a "very impressive" victory. Eleven days later, Sleepytime was moved directly into Group One class for the Fillies' Mile at Ascot and started 6/4 favourite. Sleepytime finished third to her stable companion Reams of Verse after being unable to obtain space for a clear run in the straight. Reams of Verse went on to win The Oaks in 1997.

In early 1997, Sleepytime was a clear favourite for the 1000 Guineas, after avoiding the respiratory infection which had affected many horses in Cecil's stables. Her training gallops had been highly impressive, making her the choice on many Newmarket experts and insiders. On 18 April, Sleepytime started 4/7 favourite for her first appearance as a three-year-old in the Fred Darling Stakes, a trial for the Guineas. The race produced an upset, with Sleepytime, ridden for the first time by Kieren Fallon, finishing fourth behind the 16/1 outsider Dance Parade. Two weeks later, Sleepytime was one of fifteen runners for the 1000 Guineas over Newmarket's Rowley Mile course. She started at odds of 5/1, the third choice in the betting behind Pas de Reponse the European champion two-year-old filly of 1996, and the Godolphin challenger Moonlight Paradise. Fallon restrained the filly in the early stages before moving forward three furlongs from the finish. After briefly looking unlikely to find space for a clear run, Fallon sent Sleepytime through a gap to take the lead inside the final furlong. The filly accelerated clear of the field to win by four lengths from Oh Nellie and Dazzle. After the race, Cecil, who was winning the classic for a fifth time, said that "Everything has gone against her but we know how good she is and she proved it today". He also expressed the view that while Sleepytime was likely to improve further, she would not stay beyond a mile and a quarter. In June, Sleepytime started 5/6 favourite for the Group One Coronation Stakes, in which her rivals included the Irish 1,000 Guineas winner Classic Park. After travelling well for much of the race she failed to quicken in the closing stages and finished third to the 25/1 outsider Rebecca Sharp. Sleepytime did not run again in 1997. Fallon reportedly felt that the ground had been too firm for the filly to show her best form.

Sleepytime remained in training as a four-year-old and reappeared in April at Newmarket in the Earl of Sefton Stakes. Racing against colts for the first time she was made 5/6 favourite but weakened badly in the closing stages and finished tailed-off last of the seven runners. Sleepytime returned from the race with injuries to her rear fetlocks and was retired from racing.

== Assessment ==
In their book, A Century of Champions, based on the Timeform rating system, John Randall and Tony Morris rated Sleepytime an "average" winner of the 1000 Guineas.

== Stud record ==
Sleepytime became a broodmare for Charles H. Wacker's breeding operation. She has produced several winners including Gentleman's Deal, a colt sired by Danehill, who won nine races including the Winter Derby in 2007.

- 1999 Secret Dream (IRE) : Bay filly, foaled 22 April, by Zafonic (USA) – unraced
- 2000 Ellen (IRE) : Chestnut filly, foaled 1 May, by Machiavellian (USA) – unraced
- 2001 Gentleman's Deal (IRE) : Bay colt, foaled 23 April, by Danehill (USA) – won 9 races (£143,109) including G3 Winter Derby, Lingfield; LR Ladybird Stakes, Kempton; LR Quebec Stakes, Lingfield in England 2004–7
- 2004 Spanish Harlem (IRE) : Brown colt, 13 February, by Danehill (USA) – won 1 race and 2nd G3 Gallinule Stakes, Curragh in Ireland 2006–7
- 2006 Dame Ellen (USA) : Bay filly, 6 foaled April, by Elusive Quality (USA) – won in the U.S.A. including a minor stakes at Belmont Park 2008
- 2007 Hypnology (USA) : Bay or brown filly, foaled 11 April, by Gone West (USA) – unraced, dam of winner Trust The Wind (GB)(2011, by Dansili)
- 2009 Lashyn (USA) : Chestnut filly, foaled 16 April, by Mr Greeley (USA) – won 1 race from 4 starts in England 2012
- 2011 Oh Star (USA) : Bay filly, foaled 18 February, by Tale of The Cat (USA) – won 1 race and placed 5 times, including 2nd LR Prix de Bagatelle, Maisons-Laffitte from 8 starts in England, France and Dubai 2013–15
- 2012 Hathal (USA) : Chestnut colt, foaled 5 March, by Speightstown (USA) – won 1 race and placed second from two starts to date in England in 2014–15

== Pedigree ==
Pedigree of Sleepytime (IRE), bay mare, 1994
Sire Royal Academy (USA) 1987	Nijinsky (CAN); 1967	Northern Dancer	Nearctic
Sire Royal Academy (USA) 1987	Nijinsky (CAN); 1967	Northern Dancer	Natalma
Sire Royal Academy (USA) 1987	Nijinsky (CAN); 1967	Flaming Page	Bull Page
Sire Royal Academy (USA) 1987	Nijinsky (CAN); 1967	Flaming Page	Flaring Top
Sire Royal Academy (USA) 1987	Crimson Saint (USA); 1969	Crimson Satan	Spy Song
Sire Royal Academy (USA) 1987	Crimson Saint (USA); 1969	Crimson Satan	Papila
Sire Royal Academy (USA) 1987	Crimson Saint (USA); 1969	Bolero Rose	Bolero
Sire Royal Academy (USA) 1987	Crimson Saint (USA); 1969	Bolero Rose	First Rose
Dam Alidiva (IRE) 1987	Chief Singer (IRE); 1981	Ballad Rock	Bold Lad
Dam Alidiva (IRE) 1987	Chief Singer (IRE); 1981	Ballad Rock	True Rocket
Dam Alidiva (IRE) 1987	Chief Singer (IRE); 1981	Principia	Le Fabuleux
Dam Alidiva (IRE) 1987	Chief Singer (IRE); 1981	Principia	Pia
Dam Alidiva (IRE) 1987	Alligatrix (USA); 1980	Alleged	Hoist the Flag
Dam Alidiva (IRE) 1987	Alligatrix (USA); 1980	Alleged	Princess Pout
Dam Alidiva (IRE) 1987	Alligatrix (USA); 1980	Shore	Round Table
Dam Alidiva (IRE) 1987	Alligatrix (USA); 1980	Shore	Delta (Family: 9-f)
