= Condessa =

Irish-bred Thoroughbred racehorse

- Racing silks of Paddy Barrett & Craig Singer
- Sire: Condorcet
- Grandsire: Luthier
- Dam: Varinessa
- Damsire: Varano
- Sex: Mare
- Foaled: 15 March 1978
- Country: Ireland
- Colour: Chestnut
- Breeder: D de Vere Hunt
- Owner: Paddy Barrett; Craig B Singer
- Trainer: Jim Bolger; Howard M. Tesher
- Record: 21: 5-2-4

Major wins
- Musidora Stakes (1981); Yorkshire Oaks (1981)

Condessa (15 March 1978 – 2005) was an Irish Thoroughbred racehorse. In two seasons of racing she was highly tried, racing twenty-one times, winning five times and finishing second twice. As a two-year-old she won two minor races from eight attempts, but appeared to be well behind the best of her generation. In the following year she developed to become one of the best staying fillies of her generation in Europe, beating an exceptionally strong field in the Musidora Stakes at York Racecourse, finishing second in the Irish Oaks, and recording her biggest win at the same track when she won the Yorkshire Oaks. Her victories in 1981 were the first major successes for her trainer Jim Bolger. She was later transferred to the United States where she made no impact and was retired from racing at the end of the year. She has had some influence as a broodmare.

== Background ==
Condessa was a "small, rather lightly-made" chestnut mare with a diamond-shaped white star bred in Ireland by D de Vere Hunt. She was from the first crop of foals sired by Condorcet, a French horse who won the Prix Omnium II in 1975 and the Prix Maurice de Nieuil in 1976. He was a representative of the Byerley Turk sire line, unlike more than 95% of modern thoroughbreds, who descend directly from the Darley Arabian. As a breeding stallion he later became most successful as a sire of National Hunt horses. Condessa's dam Varinessa made no impact as a racehorse, but was a half-sister of the Irish St. Leger winner Allangrange. She was a great-granddaughter of the influential broodmare Carpet Slipper, whose other descendants have included Big Brown, Val de Loir, Petoski, Golan, North Light and St Jovite.

As a yearling Condessa was offered for sale at Goffs and was bought for 13,000 guineas by the then little-known Irish trainer Jim Bolger on behalf of Paddy Barrett. Explaining how he came to buy the filly, Bolger said "A man I had bought a house from gave me 20k to buy a racehorse and I got Condessa for 13k at Goffs but for the life of me could not find another with the rest of the money so had to give him 7k back. That hurt".

== Racing career ==
=== 1980: two-year-old season ===
Condessa raced eight times as a two-year-old in 1980 at distances ranging from five furlongs to one mile. She was beaten in her first four races before winning a maiden race over seven furlongs at Gowran Park. Later that season she won the Waterford Glass Nursery at the same course and finished fifth behind Blue Wind in the Silken Glider Stakes at Leopardstown Racecourse.

=== 1981: three-year-old season ===
Condessa began her second season by winning a minor handicap race over one and a half miles at Clonmel Racecourse in April. She was then sent to England and stepped up in class for the Group Three Lingfield Oaks Trial May and finished third behind Leap Lively and Allegretta. Four days later she started a 16/1 outsider for the Musidora Stakes over ten furlongs at York Racecourse in which her four rival included Fairy Footsteps, Madam Gay and the Nell Gwyn Stakes winner Miss Markey. Ridden by Declan Gillespie she appeared outpaced in the early stages and was in last place entering the straight but than began to make good progress. Apparently relishing the soft ground, she took the lead approaching the final furlong and drew away to win by four lengths from Madam Gay. Shortly after the race she was bought by the American Craig Singer for a fee reported to be in excess of $500,000. She was then made favourite for the Ribblesdale Stakes at Royal Ascot but ran poorly on firm ground and finished unplaced behind Strigida. When moved up to Group One level for the Irish Oaks at the Curragh Racecourse on 18 July she was not expected to be suited by the firm ground and started a 16/1 outsider but ran well to finish second of the ten runners behind the odds-on favourite Blue Wind. On her next appearance she failed to show her best form when fourth behind the colt Magesterial in the Blandford Stakes at the Curragh.

Three days after her poor showing in the Blandford Stakes, Condessa returned to York for the Group One Yorkshire Oaks on 18 August. The joint-favourites were the Nassau Stakes winner Go Leasing and the Henry Cecil-trained Home on the Range, with Condessa next in the betting on 5/1 alongside her fellow Irish challenger Overplay. The other seven runners included Leap Lively and the Lancashire Oaks winner Rhein Bridge. As in the Musidora Stakes, Condessa looked outpaced in the early stages and was towards the rear of the field approaching the final turn. At this point, the outsider Silken Knot fell heavily, sustaining a fatal injury and throwing her jockey Willie Carson to the ground. In order to avoid the prostrate Carson, Gillespie was forced to pull Condessa to the wide outside, losing several lengths in the process. The filly began to make progress in the straight but was still only fifth behind Leap Lively, Fiesta Fun, Home on the Range and Overplay a furlong from the finish. Condessa produced a strong late run, took the lead fifty yards out, and won by a neck from Leap Lively.

Condessa was beaten in her three remaining races in Europe: she finished third to Gilded Vanity and Countess Tully in the Brownstown Stakes at the Curragh in August, sixth behind Alma Ata when favourite for the Park Hill Stakes at Doncaster Racecourse in September and eighteenth of twenty-four behind Gold River in the Prix de l'Arc de Triomphe at Longchamp Racecourse on 4 October.

In the late autumn of 1981 she was sent to race in North America where she was trained by Howard M. Tesher. She ran well when seventh of fourteen behind Open Call in the Rothman's International Stakes at Woodbine Racetrack in October but in her two subsequent races at Aqueduct Racecourse she failed to reproduce her European form, finishing tenth in the Long Island Handicap and eleventh in the Gallant Fox Handicap.

== Assessment ==
In the Irish Free Handicap for the two-year-olds of 1980, Condessa was allotted a weight of 106 pounds, 27 pounds behind the top-rated Storm Bird and 12 pounds behind the leading filly Swan Princess.

In the official International Classification for 1981, Condessa was given a rating of 84, sixteen-pounds behind the top-rated horse Shergar. She was the rated the fourth best three-year-old filly in Europe behind Marwell, April Run and Blue Wind. The independent Timeform organisation gave her a rating of 121, nineteen pounds behind their horse of the year Shergar.

== Breeding record ==
Condessa was retired from racing to become a broodmare for Singer in Kentucky. She produced thirteen foals and four winners between 1983 and 2000.

- Conciliate, a chestnut colt, foaled in 1983, sired by Spectacular Bid. Failed to win in four races.
- Connies Prospect, chestnut filly, 1985, by Mr. Prospector. Failed to win in two races.
- Lydney, bay filly, 1986, by Lyphard. Failed to win in four races.
- Valira, chestnut filly, 1987, by Nijinsky. Won one race.
- Bashoosh, bay filly, 1988, by Danzig. Failed to win in four races. Grand-dam of Tout Seul (Dewhurst Stakes).
- Gold Conde, chestnut filly, 1989, by Mr. Prospector. Won one race.
- Biko Pegasus, brown colt, 1991, by Danzig. Won 4 races including Grade III Centaur Stakes and Keisei Hai.
- Crypto Condessa, brown filly, 1993, by Cryptoclearance.
- Yakumo Pine, chestnut filly, 1995, by Pine Bluff. Failed to win in two races.
- Condescendance, brown filly, 1997, by El Gran Senor. Unraced. Dam of Redoute's Dancer. Female-line ancestor of Liberty Island (Japanese Triple Tiara).
- Unbridled Royalty, grey colt, 1998, by Unbridled's Song. Failed to win in nine races.
- Lobby Card, chestnut filly, 1999, by Saint Ballado. Failed to win in three races.
- Dyna Flyer, chestnut filly, 2000, by Marquetry. Won four races.

Condessa died in 2005.

== Pedigree ==
Pedigree of Condessa (IRE), chestnut mare, 1978
| Sire Condorcet (FR) 1972 | Luthier (FR); 1965 | Klairon | Clarion |
| Sire Condorcet (FR) 1972 | Luthier (FR); 1965 | Klairon | Kalmia |
| Sire Condorcet (FR) 1972 | Luthier (FR); 1965 | Flute Enchantee | Cranach |
| Sire Condorcet (FR) 1972 | Luthier (FR); 1965 | Flute Enchantee | Montagnana |
| Sire Condorcet (FR) 1972 | Pan American (FR); 1962 | Pan | Atys |
| Sire Condorcet (FR) 1972 | Pan American (FR); 1962 | Pan | Pretty Girl |
| Sire Condorcet (FR) 1972 | Pan American (FR); 1962 | Visibility Good | Chamossaire |
| Sire Condorcet (FR) 1972 | Pan American (FR); 1962 | Visibility Good | Fragrant View |
| Dam Varinessa (IRE) 1970 | Varano (GB); 1962 | Darius | Dante |
| Dam Varinessa (IRE) 1970 | Varano (GB); 1962 | Darius | Yasna |
| Dam Varinessa (IRE) 1970 | Varano (GB); 1962 | Varna | Bey |
| Dam Varinessa (IRE) 1970 | Varano (GB); 1962 | Varna | Vampa |
| Dam Varinessa (IRE) 1970 | Silken Princess (GB); 1956 | Arctic Prince | Prince Chevalier |
| Dam Varinessa (IRE) 1970 | Silken Princess (GB); 1956 | Arctic Prince | Arctic Sun |
| Dam Varinessa (IRE) 1970 | Silken Princess (GB); 1956 | Silken Slipper | Bois Roussel |
| Dam Varinessa (IRE) 1970 | Silken Princess (GB); 1956 | Silken Slipper | Carpet Slipper (Family: 5-h) |
