= Pia (horse) =

British-bred Thoroughbred racehorse

- Racing silks of Countess Margit Batthyany
- Sire: Darius
- Grandsire: Dante
- Dam: Peseta
- Damsire: Neckar
- Sex: Mare
- Foaled: 1964
- Country: United Kingdom
- Colour: Brown
- Breeder: Margit Batthyány
- Owner: Margit Batthyany
- Trainer: Bill Elsey
- Record: 13: 5-1-1
- Earnings: £34,713

Major wins
- Cherry Hinton Stakes (1966); Lowther Stakes (1966); Epsom Oaks (1967); Park Hill Stakes (1967)

Awards
- Timeform rating 116

Pia (1964 – after 1985) was a British-bred Thoroughbred racehorse and broodmare. She showed top-class form as a juvenile in 1966 when she won three races including the Cherry Hinton Stakes and the Lowther Stakes as well as finishing second in the Cheveley Park Stakes. In the following year she ran fourth in the 1000 Guineas and third in the Musidora Stakes before recording her biggest win in the Epsom Oaks. Later that year she dead-heated for first place in the Park Hill Stakes and ran fourth in a strong renewal of the Champion Stakes before being retired from racing. Although her foals made little impact on the track, her daughter Principia became an influential broodmare.

== Background ==
Pia was a brown mare with no white markings bred in England by her owner, the Countess Margit Batthyany. She was trained throughout her racing career by Bill Elsey at Malton, North Yorkshire.

She was sired by Darius who won the 2000 Guineas in 1954 and the Eclipse Stakes a year later. Darius's other progeny included Derring-Do and the Poule d'Essai des Pouliches winner Pola Bella. Her dam Peseta was a German-bred mare who raced successfully in France and whose other descendants have included the leading North American performer Pleasantly Perfect. Peseta was a female line descendant of the outstanding British broodmare Plucky Liege.

== Racing career ==
=== 1966: two-year-old season ===
In 1966 Pia won three of her six races. After winning the Gibside Stakes over five furlongs at Newcastle Racecourse the filly was moved up in class to contest the Cherry Hinton Stakes over six furlongs at Newmarket Racecourse in July. Starting at odds of 8/1 and ridden by Edward Hide she won from St Pauli Girl. A month later she followed up in the Lowther Stakes at York Racecourse, winning from Maeander and Winkie at odds of 11/1. She finished unplaced in the Seaton Delaval Stakes at Newcastle Racecourse when she failed to recover from a poor start. On her final start of the year she finished second to Fleet in the Cheveley Park Stakes at Newmarket with Maeander in third place.

In the Free Handicap, a rating of the best two-year-olds to race in Britain, Pia was given a weight of 116, making her six pounds behind Fleet, who was the highest-rated filly and seventeen pounds below the top colt Bold Lad.

=== 1967: three-year-old season ===
Pia began her second campaign in the 1000 Guineas over the Rowley Mile course at Newmarket and came home fourth behind Fleet, St Pauli Girl and Lacquer, beaten less than a length by the winner. She was then moved up in distance for the Musidora Stakes over ten furlongs at York, but finished third behind Palatch and Pink Gem, looking to be unsuited by the heavy ground. In the 189th running of the Oaks over one and a half miles at Epsom Racecourse in June Pia started at odds of 14/1 after being backed down from 20/1 on the day of the race. Ridden by Hide, she turned into the straight in fourth place before staying on very strongly to overtake St Pauli Girl a furlong out and win by three quarters of a length.

Pia returned in August and finished sixth behind Palatch in the Yorkshire Oaks. The filly was then moved up in distance for the Park Hill Stakes over fourteen furlongs on firm ground at Doncaster Racecourse. Starting the 7/2 second favourite she shared the victory as she finished in a dead heat with the favoured Pink Gem. She ran poorly when unplaced in the Sun Chariot Stakes over ten furlongs at Newmarket and was then matched against male opposition in the Champion Stakes over the same course and distance. She produced one of her best efforts as she finished fourth behind Reform, Taj Dewan and Royal Palace.

== Breeding record ==
Pia was retired from racing to become a broodmare for Countess Batthyany. She produced at least six foals and two winners between 1969 and 1985:

- Palladium, a bay colt, foaled in 1969, sired by High Hat. Won one race, runner-up in Chester Vase.
- Principia, bay filly, 1970, by Le Fabuleux. Won over 2000 metres in France. Dam of Chief Singer and female-line ancestor of Epiphaneia and Fascinating Rock
- Papenka, filly, 1972, by Sword Dancer (GB)
- Parforce, bay filly, 1977, by Mill Reef. Dam of Philippi (Prix Robert Papin).
- Parisana, brown filly, 1984, by Gift Card. Unraced.
- Proserpina, bay filly, 1985, by Shafaraz. Unraced.

== Assessment and honours ==
In their book, A Century of Champions, based on the Timeform rating system, John Randall and Tony Morris rated Pia a "poor" winner of the Oaks.

== Pedigree ==
Pedigree of Pia (GB), brown mare, 1964
Sire Darius (GB) 1951	Dante (GB); 1942	Nearco	Pharos
Sire Darius (GB) 1951	Dante (GB); 1942	Nearco	Nogara
Sire Darius (GB) 1951	Dante (GB); 1942	Rosy Legend	Dark Legend
Sire Darius (GB) 1951	Dante (GB); 1942	Rosy Legend	Rosy Cheeks
Sire Darius (GB) 1951	Yasna (GB); 1936	Dastur	Solario
Sire Darius (GB) 1951	Yasna (GB); 1936	Dastur	Friar's Daughter
Sire Darius (GB) 1951	Yasna (GB); 1936	Ariadne	Arion
Sire Darius (GB) 1951	Yasna (GB); 1936	Ariadne	Security
Dam Peseta (GER) 1957	Neckar (GER); 1948	Ticino	Athanasius
Dam Peseta (GER) 1957	Neckar (GER); 1948	Ticino	Terra
Dam Peseta (GER) 1957	Neckar (GER); 1948	Nixe	Arjaman
Dam Peseta (GER) 1957	Neckar (GER); 1948	Nixe	Nanon
Dam Peseta (GER) 1957	Prompt Payment (GB); 1950	Rockefella	Hyperion
Dam Peseta (GER) 1957	Prompt Payment (GB); 1950	Rockefella	Rockfel
Dam Peseta (GER) 1957	Prompt Payment (GB); 1950	Satanella	Mahmoud
Dam Peseta (GER) 1957	Prompt Payment (GB); 1950	Satanella	Avella (Family 16-a)
