= Biko Pegasus =

Japanese-bred Thoroughbred racehorse (1991–2019)

Biko Pegasus ビコーペガサス
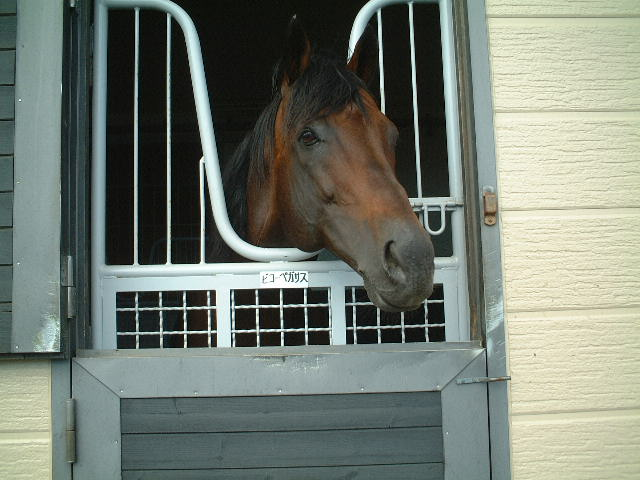
- Biko Pegasus in 2004.
- Breed: Thoroughbred
- Sire: Danzig
- Grandsire: Northern Dancer
- Dam: Condessa
- Damsire: Condorcet
- Sex: Stallion
- Foaled: August 2, 1991
- Died: June 11, 2019 (aged 27)
- Country: Japan
- Color: Bay
- Breeder: Robert Steven Stables
- Owner: U.Legend
- Racing colours
- Trainer: Tsugio Yanagida
- Jockey: Yutaka Take; Hitoshi Matoba; Hiroyuki Uemura
- Record: 27: 4-6-2
- Earnings: ¥358,805,000

Major wins
- Keisei Hai (1994); Centaur Stakes (1995)

Biko Pegasus (Japanese: ビコーペガサス, Hepburn: Bikō Pegasasu; 8 February 1991 – 11 June 2019) was a Japanese-trained Thoroughbred racehorse who raced in Japan from 1993 to 1998.

Although he had a distinctly small physique for a racehorse, Biko Pegasus proved to be a competitive sprinter and miler, securing wins in the 1994 Keisei Hai and the 1995 Centaur Stakes, as well as finishing second in notable G1 races such as the 1994 and 1995 Sprinters Stakes, and the 1996 Takamatsunomiya Hai.

After his racing career, he served as a stud from 1999 to 2006. He lived in retirement in Hokkaido until passing away in 2019.

== Background ==
Biko Pegasus was an American-bred, Japanese-trained racehorse that was active from 1993 to 1998. Bred by Robert Steven Stables, he was acquired by Legend Co. Ltd. and was later imported to Japan to be trained by Tsugio Yanagida.

He was sired by Danzig, who was one of the most influential sires, whose progeny included Breeders' Cup winners Chief's Crown, Lure, Dance Smartly, and War Chant. His dam, Condessa, was an Irish Thoroughbred racehorse with a win in the 1981 Yorkshire Oaks, and a second-place finish in the Irish Oaks. Her mareline descendants also include Symboli Gran, who won the 2005 CBC Sho, as well as the 2023 Japanese Triple Tiara winner Liberty Island.

== Racing Form ==
Biko Pegasus competed in a total of 27 races, 4 of which he won.

Date	Race	Distance	Surface	Track	Finish	Field	Jockey	1st Place (2nd Place)
1993 – three-year-old season
Nov 6	3YO DBT	1200m	Dirt	Kyoto	1st	15	Hiroyuki Uemura	(Trona Lucky)
Dec 26	Sazanka Sho	1400m	Dirt	Hanshin	1st	16	Hiroyuki Uemura	(Lively Mount)
1994 – four-year-old season
Jan 9	Keisei Hai	1600m	Turf	Nakayama	1st	8	Hitoshi Matoba	(Hishi Amazon)
Jun 5	New Zealand Trophy Yonsai Stakes	1600m	Turf	Tokyo	3rd	9	Hiroyuki Uemura	Hishi Amazon
Jul 2	Chunichi Sports Sho Yonsai Stakes	1800m	Turf	Chukyo	2nd	12	Hiroyuki Uemura	Inazuma Takao
Oct 29	Swan Stakes	1400m	Turf	Hanshin	7th	18	Hiroyuki Uemura	Sakura Bakushin O
Nov 20	Mile Championship	1600m	Turf	Kyoto	5th	14	Hitoshi Matoba	North Flight
Dec 18	Sprinters Stakes	1200m	Turf	Nakayama	2nd	14	Hitoshi Matoba	Sakura Bakushin O
1995 – five-year-old season
Apr 22	Ritto Stakes	1400m	Dirt	Kyoto	7th	16	Hiroyuki Uemura	Marutaka Toko
May 14	Yasuda Kinen	1600m	Turf	Tokyo	4th	18	Hitoshi Matoba	Heart Lake
Jun 3	Hankyu Hai	1400m	Turf	Kyoto	12th	18	Hiroyuki Uemura	Bodyguard
Oct 1	Centaur Stakes	1400m	Turf	Kyoto	1st	16	Yutaka Take	(Star Ballerina)
Nov 19	Mile Championship	1600m	Turf	Kyoto	4th	18	Yutaka Take	Trot Thunder
Dec 17	Sprinters Stakes	1200m	Turf	Nakayama	2nd	16	Norihiro Yokoyama	Hishi Akebono
1996 – six-year-old season
Apr 6	Lord Derby Challenge Trophy	1600m	Turf	Nakayama	3rd	16	Yutaka Take	Fujino Makken O
May 19	Takamatsunomiya Hai	1200m	Turf	Chukyo	2nd	13	Norihiro Yokoyama	Flower Park
Jun 9	Yasuda Kinen	1600m	Turf	Tokyo	5th	17	Hitoshi Matoba	Trot Thunder
Oct 26	Swan Stakes	1400m	Turf	Kyoto	2nd	16	Hitoshi Matoba	Sugino Hayakaze
Nov 17	Mile Championship	1600m	Turf	Kyoto	9th	18	Hitoshi Matoba	Genuine
Dec 15	Sprinter Stakes	1200m	Turf	Nakayama	7th	11	Hitoshi Matoba	Flower Park
1997 – seven-year-old season
Feb 16	February Stakes	1600m	Dirt	Tokyo	4th	16	Yutaka Take	Shinko Windy
Apr 20	Silk Road Stakes	1200m	Turf	Kyoto	2nd	16	Hiroyuki Uemura	Eishin Berlin
May 18	Takamatsunomiya Hai	1200m	Turf	Chukyo	10th	18	Norihiro Yokoyama	Shinko King
Jun 8	Yasuda Kinen	1600m	Turf	Tokyo	6th	18	Norihiro Yokoyama	Taiki Blizzard
1998 – eight-year-old season
Mar 8	Yomiuri Milers Cup	1600m	Turf	Hanshin	11th	11	Hiroyuki Uemura	Big Sunday
May 24	Takamatsunomiya Kinen	1200m	Turf	Chukyo	6th	16	Hiroyuki Uemura	Shinko Forest
Jun 14	Yasuda Kinen	1600m	Turf	Nakayama	13th	17	Hiroyuki Uemura	Taiki Shuttle

== Retirement and stud career ==
Following his 1998 retirement, Biko Pegasus served as a breeding stallion from 1999 to 2006. During his first year of stud duty, he covered 58 mares in total, producing 32 foals, of which 25 raced and 15 won. However, he covered no more than nine mares in any later year. In total, 29 of his foals raced, 17 of them winning, though none won a graded stakes race.

After retiring from stud duty, he lived at Rolling Eggs Club Stable in Shinhidaka, Hokkaido. Reportedly, in 2010, he was still in shape due to the fact that he liked staying out in the pasture. His caretakers also said that he was startled by the sound of chains and scissors; due to this the staff sings songs during grooming to help mask the noise.

He passed away on June 11, 2019, at the age of 28.

== In popular culture ==
An anthropomorphized version of Biko Pegasus appears as a character in the Japanese multimedia franchise Umamusume: Pretty Derby, voiced by Aimi Tanaka.

== Pedigree ==
Pedigree of Biko Pegasus
Sire Danzig (USA) 1977 b.	Northern Dancer (CAN); 1961 b.	Nearctic	Nearco
Sire Danzig (USA) 1977 b.	Northern Dancer (CAN); 1961 b.	Nearctic	Lady Angela
Sire Danzig (USA) 1977 b.	Northern Dancer (CAN); 1961 b.	Natalma	Native Dancer
Sire Danzig (USA) 1977 b.	Northern Dancer (CAN); 1961 b.	Natalma	Almahmoud
Sire Danzig (USA) 1977 b.	Pas De Nom (USA); 1968 dk.b.	Admiral's Voyage	Crafty Admiral
Sire Danzig (USA) 1977 b.	Pas De Nom (USA); 1968 dk.b.	Admiral's Voyage	Olympia Lou
Sire Danzig (USA) 1977 b.	Pas De Nom (USA); 1968 dk.b.	Petitioner	Petition
Sire Danzig (USA) 1977 b.	Pas De Nom (USA); 1968 dk.b.	Petitioner	Steady Aim
Dam Condessa (IRE) 1978 ch.	Condorcet (FR); 1972 b.	Luthier	Klairon
Dam Condessa (IRE) 1978 ch.	Condorcet (FR); 1972 b.	Luthier	Flute Enchantee
Dam Condessa (IRE) 1978 ch.	Condorcet (FR); 1972 b.	Pan American	Pan
Dam Condessa (IRE) 1978 ch.	Condorcet (FR); 1972 b.	Pan American	Visibility Good
Dam Condessa (IRE) 1978 ch.	Varinessa (IRE); 1970 b.	Varano	Darius
Dam Condessa (IRE) 1978 ch.	Varinessa (IRE); 1970 b.	Varano	Varna
Dam Condessa (IRE) 1978 ch.	Varinessa (IRE); 1970 b.	Silken Princess	Arctic Prince
Dam Condessa (IRE) 1978 ch.	Varinessa (IRE); 1970 b.	Silken Princess	Silken Slipper
