= Hishi Akebono =

American-bred Japanese Thoroughbred racehorse

Hishi Akebono ヒシアケボノ
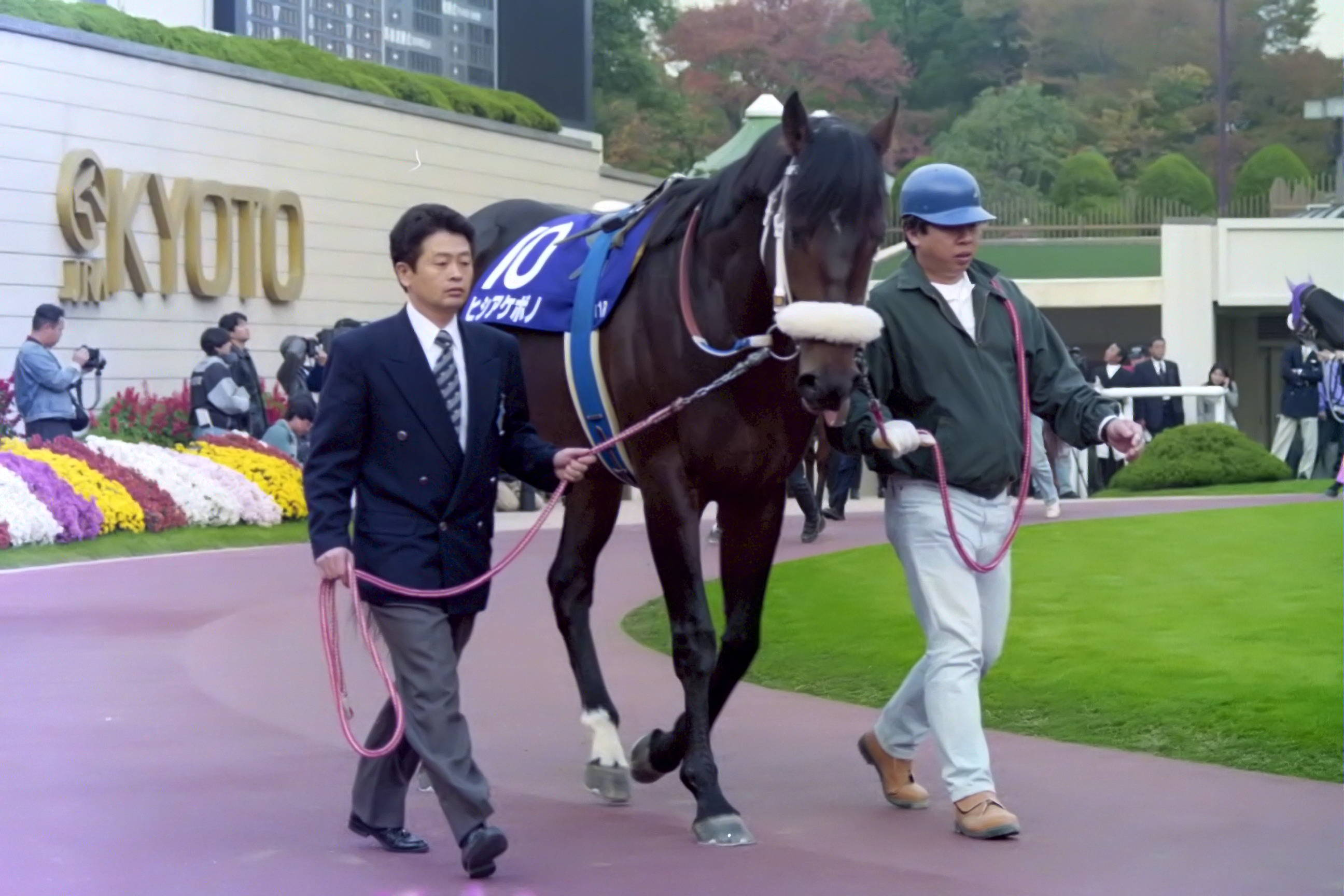
- Hishi Akebono at Kyoto Racecourse in November 1996.
- Breed: Thoroughbred
- Sire: Woodman
- Grandsire: Mr. Prospector
- Dam: Mysteries
- Damsire: Seattle Slew
- Sex: Stallion
- Foaled: February 27, 1992
- Died: November 19, 2008 (aged 16)
- Country: United States
- Colour: Black
- Breeder: Swettenham Stud et al.
- Owner: Masaichiro Abe
- Racing colours
- Trainer: Masaru Sato
- Jockey: Koichi Tsunoda; Hiroshi Kawachi
- Record: 30: 6-1-6
- Earnings: ¥324,262,000

Major wins
- Swan Stakes (1995); Sprinters Stakes (1995)

Awards
- JRA Award for Best Sprinter or Miler (1995)
- Last updated on October 11 2026

Hishi Akebono (Japanese: ヒシアケボノ, Hepburn: Hishi Akebono; 27 February 1992 – 19 November 2008) was an American-bred, Japanese-trained Thoroughbred racehorse and sire. Best known for his exceptional power and weight-carrying ability, he won the 1995 Sprinters Stakes and Swan Stakes.

Weighing 560 kg during his Sprinters Stakes victory, Hishi Akebono set the record as the heaviest horse to ever win a JRA Grade 1 race on turf. (Note: The overall Japanese record for a G1 winner is held by Apollo Kentucky at 565 kg in the 2016 Tokyo Daishoten (NAR dirt).) He was a half-brother to the champion sprinter Agnes World and an uncle to the European Group 1 winner Dubai Destination.

== Background ==
Hishi Akebono was a black stallion bred in the United States by Swettenham Stud and partners. He was sired by Woodman, a son of the legendary Mr. Prospector, and out of the Seattle Slew mare Mysteries. His dam Mysteries was also the mother of Agnes World, who won the July Cup (GI) in England and the Prix de l'Abbaye (GI) in France, making Hishi Akebono a member of one of the most accomplished international sprinting families of the era.

He was purchased by Masaichiro Abe and imported to Japan, where he was trained by Masaru Sato at the Ritto Training Center. Throughout his career, he was primarily ridden by Koichi Tsunoda, who expertly managed the colt's massive frame and powerful closing kick.

== Racing career ==
=== 1994–1995: Early career and breakthrough ===
Hishi Akebono made his debut in November 1994 at Tokyo Racecourse, finishing fourth and second in two maiden starts. After a brief stint on dirt where he struggled, he returned to the turf and broke his maiden in July 1995 at Chukyo. He then reeled off four consecutive victories, including the Swan Stakes (GII) in a Japanese record time of 1:19.8 for 1400 meters.

On December 17, 1995, he entered the Sprinters Stakes (GI) at Nakayama as the favorite. Carrying a race weight of 560 kg, he delivered a dominant performance to win Japan's premier sprint championship, setting the JRA record for the heaviest G1 turf winner in history. He was subsequently named the 1995 JRA Best Sprinter or Miler.

=== 1996–1997: Weight struggles and retirement ===
Hishi Akebono continued racing through 1996 and 1997 but struggled with extreme weight fluctuations. In the 1996 Swan Stakes, he arrived at the track weighing 580 kg (a 30 kg increase) and finished 11th. He followed with a 582 kg effort in the Mile Championship (15th). Though he dropped to 566 kg for the Sprinters Stakes, he finished fourth.

In 1997, he carried 61 kg in the Baden-Baden Cup Open and finished fifth, but failed to place in any subsequent graded stakes. He was retired after finishing ninth in the December 1997 Sprinters Stakes.

== Stud career and death ==
Following his retirement, Hishi Akebono stood at the JBBA Shimofusa Stallion Station in Chiba Prefecture before moving to the University of Tokyo's Faculty of Agriculture farm in Ibaraki Prefecture in August 2007. He did not produce any major stakes winners as a sire, though his daughter Crown Rose (out of Hishi Asuka) won the 2013 Fairy Stakes (GIII).

Hishi Akebono fell ill in October 2008 and was transferred to the JRA Equine Research Institute for examination on November 17. He died two days later on November 19, 2008, at the age of 16. The specific cause of death was not publicly disclosed.

== Statistics ==
The following table details all 30 starts of Hishi Akebono's racing career based on official netkeiba and JBIS race charts.

Date	Distance (Condition)	Race	Class	Course	Odds (Favourite)	Field	Finish	Time	Winning (Losing) Margin	Winner (2nd Place)	Jockey	Ref
1994 – two-year-old season
Nov 5	Turf 1600 m (Good)	3-Y-O Newcomer	Maiden	Tokyo	4.7 (2nd)	12	4th	1:36.8	0.8	Kokuto Julian	Katsuhiro Tanaka	
Nov 20	Turf 1600 m (Good)	3-Y-O Newcomer	Maiden	Tokyo	2.1 (2nd)	8	2nd	1:35.5	0.5	Taiki Crescent	Katsuhiro Tanaka	
1995 – three-year-old season
May 20	Dirt 1200 m (Good)	4-Y-O Maiden	Maiden	Tokyo	2.6 (1st)	16	3rd	1:13.6	0.1	Long Scorpio	Katsuhiro Tanaka	
Jun 3	Dirt 1200 m (Good)	4-Y-O Maiden	Maiden	Kyoto	2.0 (1st)	13	4th	1:13.0	0.8	Yamanin Flight	Katsuhiro Tanaka	
Jun 18	Dirt 1700 m (Good)	4-Y-O Maiden	Maiden	Chukyo	2.2 (1st)	16	5th	1:49.9	1.2	Long Haruka	Yutaka Take	
Jul 8	Turf 1200 m (Good)	4-Y-O Maiden	Maiden	Chukyo	2.2 (1st)	15	1st	1:09.5	–2.2	(Kuroi Dangan)	Hiroshi Kawachi	
Jul 22	Turf 1200 m (Good)	Chikushi Tokubetsu	Allowance (1 win)	Kokura	1.8 (1st)	15	1st	1:08.6	–1.0	(Win Caesar)	Hiroshi Kawachi	
Aug 6	Turf 1200 m (Good)	Ariake Tokubetsu	Allowance (2 win)	Kokura	1.7 (1st)	15	1st	1:09.1	–0.1	(Cosmo Glory)	Koichi Tsunoda	
Aug 20	Turf 1200 m (Good)	Yamanami Stakes	Allowance (3 win)	Kokura	2.9 (2nd)	10	1st	1:09.0	–0.3	(Cheers Hope)	Koichi Tsunoda	
Sep 10	Turf 1600 m (Good)	Keio Hai Autumn Handicap	GIII	Nakayama	4.2 (2nd)	12	3rd	1:32.7	0.0	Dojima Muteki	Hiroshi Kawachi	
Sep 27	Dirt 1200 m (Good)	Tokyo Hai	GS	Ohi	2.8 (1st)	10	6th	1:12.9	0.9	Sakura High Speed	Hiroshi Kawachi	
Oct 28	Turf 1400 m (Good)	Swan Stakes	GII	Kyoto	7.3 (4th)	14	1st	R1:19.8	–0.7	(Noble Grass)	Koichi Tsunoda	
Nov 19	Turf 1600 m (Good)	Mile Championship	GI	Kyoto	3.6 (2nd)	18	3rd	1:33.9	0.2	Trot Thunder	Koichi Tsunoda	
Dec 17	Turf 1200 m (Good)	Sprinters Stakes	GI	Nakayama	2.3 (1st)	16	1st	1:08.1	–0.2	(Biko Pegasus)	Koichi Tsunoda	
1996 – four-year-old season
Apr 28	Turf 1200 m (Good)	Silk Road Stakes	GIII	Kyoto	3.4 (1st)	13	3rd	1:07.9	0.3	Flower Park	Koichi Tsunoda	
May 19	Turf 1200 m (Good)	Takamatsunomiya Hai	GI	Chukyo	2.3 (1st)	13	3rd	1:08.0	0.6	Flower Park	Koichi Tsunoda	
Jun 9	Turf 1600 m (Good)	Yasuda Kinen	GI	Tokyo	31.0 (12th)	17	3rd	1:33.2	0.1	Trot Thunder	Koichi Tsunoda	
Oct 26	Turf 1400 m (Good)	Swan Stakes	GII	Kyoto	5.3 (3rd)	16	11th	1:20.1	0.8	Sugino Hayakaze	Koichi Tsunoda	
Nov 17	Turf 1600 m (Good)	Mile Championship	GI	Kyoto	8.0 (4th)	18	15th	1:35.7	1.9	Genuine	Koichi Tsunoda	
Dec 15	Turf 1200 m (Good)	Sprinters Stakes	GI	Nakayama	9.3 (4th)	11	4th	1:09.7	0.9	Flower Park	Koichi Tsunoda	
1997 – five-year-old season
Jan 12	Turf 1600 m (Good)	Rakuyo Stakes	Open	Kyoto	4.3 (3rd)	16	8th	1:35.4	1.1	Juno Pentagon	Koichi Tsunoda	
Apr 20	Turf 1200 m (Good)	Silk Road Stakes	GIII	Kyoto	9.1 (2nd)	16	15th	1:09.0	2.1	Eishin Berlin	Hiroshi Kawachi	
May 18	Turf 1200 m (Good)	Takamatsunomiya Hai	GI	Chukyo	20.1 (8th)	18	14th	1:09.5	1.5	Shinko King	Koichi Tsunoda	
Jun 8	Turf 1600 m (Good)	Yasuda Kinen	GI	Tokyo	66.0 (13th)	18	8th	1:34.6	0.8	Taiki Blizzard	Koichi Tsunoda	
Jun 15	Turf 1200 m (Good)	Baden-Baden Cup	Open	Fukushima	4.4 (1st)	15	5th	1:07.8	0.3	Shadow Creek	Koichi Tsunoda	
Sep 28	Turf 1400 m (Good)	Centaur Stakes	GIII	Hanshin	4.0 (1st)	14	13th	1:22.2	1.2	Osumi Tycoon	Koichi Tsunoda	
Oct 25	Turf 1400 m (Good)	Swan Stakes	GII	Kyoto	25.0 (10th)	16	11th	1:22.2	1.5	Taiki Shuttle	Koichi Tsunoda	
Nov 16	Turf 1600 m (Good)	Mile Championship	GI	Kyoto	98.1 (16th)	18	14th	1:35.9	2.6	Taiki Shuttle	Koichi Tsunoda	
Nov 22	Turf 1200 m (Good)	CBC Sho	GII	Chukyo	34.3 (7th)	15	7th	1:09.5	1.6	Sugino Hayakaze	Koichi Tsunoda	
Dec 14	Turf 1200 m (Good)	Sprinters Stakes	GI	Nakayama	53.9 (10th)	16	9th	1:09.4	1.6	Taiki Shuttle	Eiji Nakadate	

- Note: "R" in the Time column indicates a course record.

== In popular culture ==
An anthropomorphized version of Hishi Akebono appears as a character in the Japanese multimedia franchise Umamusume: Pretty Derby, voiced by Rei Matsuzaki. She is depicted as a jovial, magnanimous girl with an incredible talent for cooking as well as a strong sense of justice. She holds the distinction of being the largest playable trainee in the game at 180 centimeters tall, reflecting Hishi Akebono's real-life reputation as a powerful, heavy-framed sprinter who excelled despite carrying significant weight. Similar to her real-life counterpart, she is the roommate and rival of Biko Pegasus, and is often depicted enjoying large meals in reference to her real-life counterpart's substantial physique.

== Pedigree ==
Pedigree of Hishi Akebono (USA)
Sire Woodman 1983	Mr. Prospector; 1970	Raise a Native	Native Dancer
Sire Woodman 1983	Mr. Prospector; 1970	Raise a Native	Raise You
Sire Woodman 1983	Mr. Prospector; 1970	Gold Digger	Nashua
Sire Woodman 1983	Mr. Prospector; 1970	Gold Digger	Sequence
Sire Woodman 1983	Playmate; 1975	Buckpasser	Tom Fool
Sire Woodman 1983	Playmate; 1975	Buckpasser	Busanda
Sire Woodman 1983	Playmate; 1975	Intriguing	Swaps
Sire Woodman 1983	Playmate; 1975	Intriguing	Glamour
Dam Mysteries 1986	Seattle Slew; 1974	Bold Reasoning	Boldnesian
Dam Mysteries 1986	Seattle Slew; 1974	Bold Reasoning	Reason to Earn
Dam Mysteries 1986	Seattle Slew; 1974	My Charmer	Poker
Dam Mysteries 1986	Seattle Slew; 1974	My Charmer	Fair Charmer
Dam Mysteries 1986	Phydilla; 1978	Lyphard	Northern Dancer
Dam Mysteries 1986	Phydilla; 1978	Lyphard	Goofed
Dam Mysteries 1986	Phydilla; 1978	Godzilla	Gyr
Dam Mysteries 1986	Phydilla; 1978	Godzilla	Gently

== See also ==
- Thoroughbred racing in Japan
- Sprinters Stakes
- Agnes World
