= Lester Piggott =

British jockey (1935–2022)

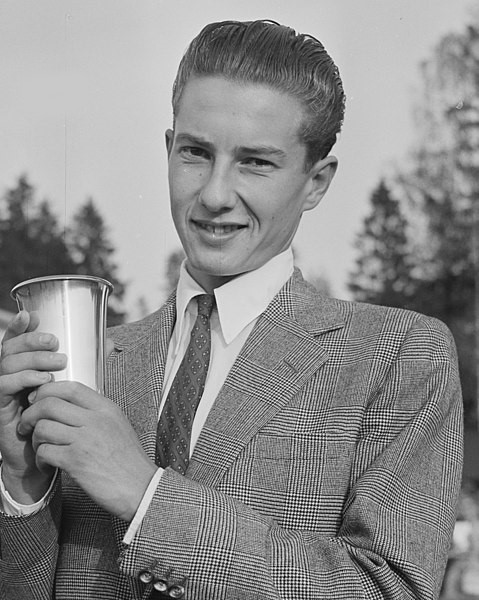
- Piggott in 1955

Personal information
- Born: 5 November 1935 Wantage, Berkshire, England
- Died: 29 May 2022 (aged 86) Geneva, Switzerland
- Occupations: Jockey; trainer
- Height: 1.71 m (5 ft 7 in)
- Weight: 8 st 5 lb (117 lb; 53 kg)
- Spouse: Susan Armstrong (m. 1960, separated)
- Children: 3, including Tracy
- Relative: Ernest Piggott (grandfather)

Horse racing career
- Sport: Horse racing

Major racing wins
- British Classic Race wins as jockey (30): 2000 Guineas (5); 1000 Guineas (2); Epsom Derby (9); Epsom Oaks (6); St Leger Stakes (8)

Racing awards
- British flat racing Champion Jockey 11 times (1960, 1964, 1965, 1966, 1967, 1968, 1969, 1970, 1971, 1981, 1982); British Champions Series Hall of Fame (2021)

Honours
- OBE (withdrawn)

Significant horses
- Never Say Die; Crepello; Petite Etoile; St. Paddy; Sir Ivor; Nijinsky; Roberto; Empery; The Minstrel; Alleged; Teenoso; Shadeed; Royal Academy; Rodrigo de Triano

Lester Keith Piggott (5 November 1935 – 29 May 2022) was an English professional jockey and horse trainer. With 4,493 career flat racing wins in Britain, including a record nine Epsom Derby victories, he is widely regarded as one of the greatest flat racing jockeys of all time and the originator of a much-imitated style. Popularly called "The Long Fellow", he was known for his competitive personality, restricting his weight and, on occasion, not sparing the whip, such as in the 1972 Derby. Piggott was convicted of tax fraud in 1987 and sentenced to three years in prison, but served just over a year.

== Early life ==
Piggott was born in Wantage, Berkshire, to a family that could trace its roots as jockeys and trainers back to the 18th century. The Piggotts were a Cheshire farming family who from the 1870s ran the Crown Inn in Nantwich for over 30 years. Piggott's grandfather, Ernest Piggott (1878–1967), rode three Grand National winners, in 1912, 1918 and 1919, and was married to a sister of the jockeys Mornington Cannon and Kempton Cannon, who both rode winners of the Derby, in 1899 and 1904, respectively. He was also three-times British jump racing Champion Jockey (in 1910, 1913 and 1915), and owned a racehorse stable at the Old Manor in Letcombe Regis (now in Oxfordshire).

Piggott's father, Ernest Keith Piggott (1904–1993), was a successful National Hunt jockey and trainer, winning the Champion Hurdle as a jockey in 1939 and the Grand National as a trainer in 1963 with Ayala, becoming the British jump racing Champion Trainer of the 1962–63 season. He owned a training stable at South Bank in Lambourn, where Lester Piggott lived until 1954. Lester Piggott was a cousin, through his mother Lilian Iris Rickaby, of jockeys Bill and Fred Rickaby. Fred was British flat racing Champion Apprentice in 1931 and 1932.

== Career ==
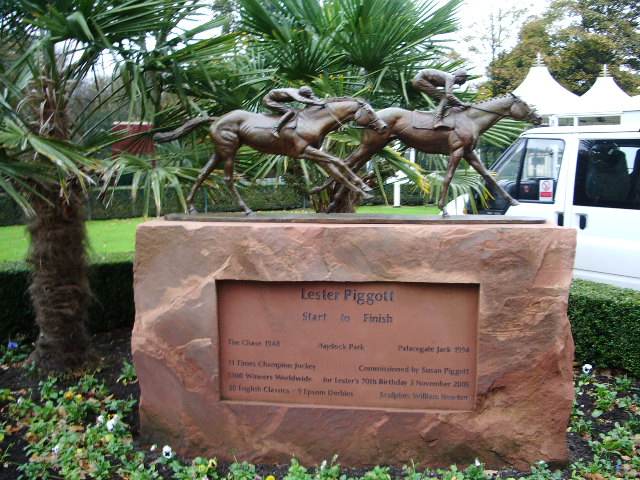
Statue to Piggott at Haydock Park Racecourse, Merseyside, installed for his 70th birthday

Piggott began racing horses from his father's stable when he was ten years old and won his first race in 1948, aged twelve, on a horse called The Chase, at Haydock Park. Piggott was known for his quiet demeanour. He described his mother as wisely playing down his success, while his father rarely gave advice unless there had been a particular mistake. By his teens a sensation in the racing world, he rode his first winner of The Derby on Never Say Die in 1954, aged eighteen, and went on to win eight more, on Crepello (1957), St. Paddy (1960), Sir Ivor (1968), Nijinsky (1970), Roberto (1972), Empery (1976), The Minstrel (1977) and Teenoso (1983). He was stable jockey to Noel Murless and later to Vincent O'Brien and had a glittering career of unparalleled success. Known as the "housewives' favourite", Piggott had legions of followers and did much to expand the popularity of horse racing beyond its narrow, class-based origins. Piggott, along with contemporaries such as Sir Gordon Richards, helped expand the appeal of British flat racing, both domestically and abroad, through increased media exposure and growing public interest.

Famously tall for a flat jockey (5 ft 7 in/1.70 m), hence his nickname of "The Long Fellow", Piggott struggled to keep his weight down and for most of his career rode at 8 stone 5 pounds (53 kg; 117 lb). He pioneered a new style of race-riding that was subsequently widely adopted by colleagues at home and abroad and enabled him to become Champion Jockey eleven times. He also rode over hurdles early in his career.

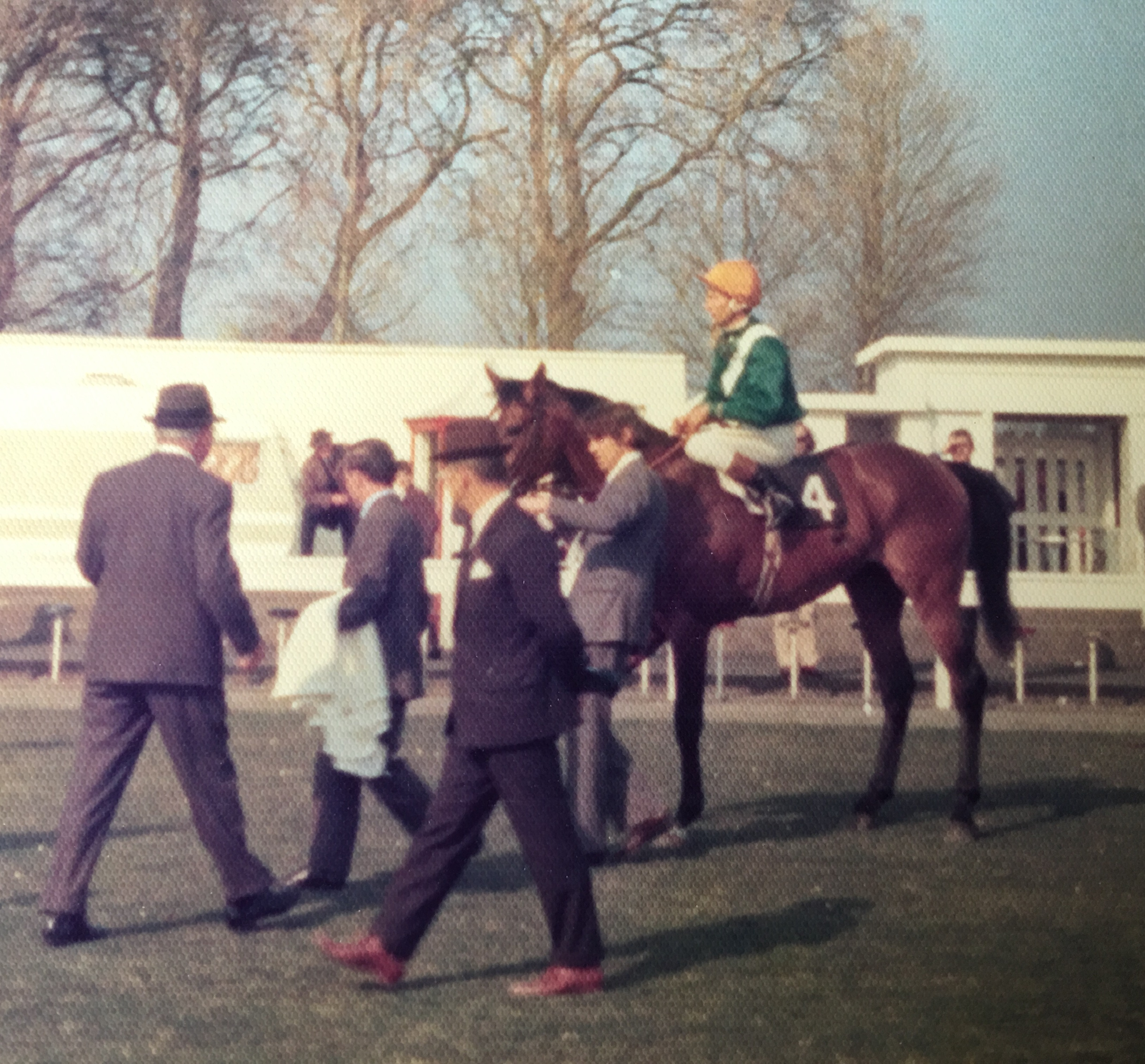
Piggott riding Apalachee in 1973 or 1974

In 1980, his relationship with the Sangster–O'Brien combination came to an end and he was appointed stable jockey to Noel Murless's son-in-law Henry Cecil, the British flat racing Champion Trainer, at Murless's old stables, Warren Place. He was again champion jockey in 1981 and 1982.

In late 1983, a dispute arose as to whether Piggott had reneged on an agreement to ride Daniel Wildenstein's All Along in the Prix de l'Arc de Triomphe for Patrick Louis Biancone when Piggott stated he had agreed to ride the previous year's Arc third Awaasif and could only ride All Along if that horse did not run. All Along was ridden instead by Walter Swinburn, with Wildenstein refusing to allow Piggott to ride any more of his horses. It was costly for Piggott, as All Along won the Arc and a string of other international races in an autumn campaign that ended with her being named U.S. Horse of the Year. As Wildenstein was one of Cecil's principal owners, this placed a strain on the relationship and, in 1984, Cecil and Piggott split, with Steve Cauthen taking over at Warren Place.

In 1985, Piggott rode freelance, with big wins including the Prix de Diane for André Fabre aboard Lypharita, the 2000 Guineas Stakes for Michael Stoute on Shadeed and the Benson and Hedges Gold Cup and Irish Champion Stakes for Luca Cumani on Commanche Run.

With 4,493 career wins on the Flat in Britain and approximately 5,300 worldwide, including a record nine Epsom Derby victories, he is widely regarded as THE GREATEST flat racing jockeys of all time. Piggott's 30 Classic wins in Britain came from 25 individual horses.

Of his great winners, Piggott regarded Sir Ivor as the easiest to ride.

== Later life ==
Piggott retired as a jockey at the end of the 1985 flat season and became a trainer. His Eve Lodge stables in Newmarket in Suffolk, housed 97 horses and sent out 34 winners. His burgeoning new career as a trainer was ended when he was convicted of tax fraud and jailed. He was stripped of his appointment as Officer of the Order of the British Empire (OBE), which had been awarded in 1975. He served 366 days in prison. According to Piggott, a commonly held belief that he was prosecuted after using an undeclared bank account, to make a final settlement of his tax liabilities, is a myth.

Piggott resumed his career as a jockey in 1990, at the age of 55, and won the Breeders' Cup Mile on Royal Academy within ten days of his return. He rode another Classic winner, Rodrigo de Triano, in the 1992 2000 Guineas. His last win in Britain was in October 1994 and he officially retired in 1995; his last British ride was in the November Handicap on 5 November 1994, but he rode abroad through the winter of 1994–95, winning the Black Opal Stakes on Zadok in Canberra on 5 March 1995 before deciding not to return for the 1995 British Flat turf season.

Piggott lived near Newmarket for the entire duration of his career. He later emigrated to Bursinel, Switzerland, where he continued to reside with his partner and family friend Lady Barbara FitzGerald, then the 55-year-old wife of Lord John FitzGerald, though legally he was still married to his wife Susan. In 2004, he published the book Lester's Derbys.

On 15 May 2007, Piggott was admitted to intensive care in a hospital in Geneva, following a recurrence of a previous heart problem. His wife stated that this illness was not life-threatening and that he was recovering in intensive care as a precaution. He attended Royal Ascot in June 2007 and the Epsom Derby in June 2008 where he tipped the winner, New Approach, during a BBC television interview. He was also present for the 2009 Cheltenham Gold Cup where he presented a trophy to jockey Tony McCoy.

In 2014, the Eve Lodge Stables training yard and complex, which included four semi-detached, two-bedroom bungalows and which could house up to 100 horses, was put on the market for £1.25 million.

== Personal life and death ==
Piggott was married to Susan Armstrong. They married at St. Mark's church, North Audley Street, London, in 1960. Her father, Sam Armstrong, and her brother, Robert Armstrong, were both racehorse trainers. They had two daughters, Maureen, an ex-eventer (married to Derby-winning trainer William Haggas) and Tracy (a sports presenter on Irish television station RTÉ). He also had a son, Jamie, also a jockey, from a relationship with Anna Ludlow.

Piggott was partially deaf and had a minor speech impediment. He was also known for his dry wit, despite a reputation for being taciturn. For example, when asked by a reporter, after Karabas had won the 1969 Washington International, when he thought he would win, Piggott replied "about two weeks ago". Allegedly when asked by a stable employee for a £1 gratuity, Piggott motioned to the employee to speak into his "good ear", at which point the employee increased the request to £2. Piggott responded with "try the other ear again". On being asked by a young girl serving him with ice cream if he was soul singer Wilson Pickett, he said "yes".

Piggott died at a hospital in Geneva, Switzerland, on 29 May 2022, aged 86.

== Recognition ==
The annual jockey awards The Lesters, inaugurated in 1990, are named in his honour. In 1999, the Racing Post ranked Piggott as second in their list of the Top 50 jockeys of the 20th century, behind Gordon Richards. In 2021, Piggott was, along with Frankel, one of the first two entries in the British Champions Series Hall of Fame.

Since 2023, the Lester Piggott Handicap Stakes have been run in his honour during the first day of The Derby festival each year at Epsom.

== Major wins ==
Below is a list of major victories by Piggott, as determined by the RacingBase website, categorised by the country of the race.

Canada

- Canadian International Stakes – (1) – Dahlia (1974)

France

- Grand Critérium (Prix Jean-Luc Lagardère) – (3) – Sir Ivor (1967), Breton (1969), My Swallow (1970)
- Grand Prix de Paris – (2) – Roll of Honour (1970), Sagaro (1974)
- Grand Prix de Saint-Cloud – (1) – Teenoso (1984)
- Poule d'Essai des Pouliches – (2) – Rajput Princess (1964), River Lady (1982)
- Prix de l'Abbaye de Longchamp – (4) – Tower Walk (1969), Balidar (1970), Moorestyle (1980), Mr Brooks (1992)
- Prix de l'Arc de Triomphe – (3) – Rheingold (1973), Alleged (1977 & 1978)
- Prix de Diane – (3) – Mrs Penny (1980), Madam Gay (1981), Lypharita (1985)
- Prix de la Forêt – (2) – Moorestyle (1980 & 1981)
- Prix Ganay – (1) – Trillion (1978)
- Prix Jacques Le Marois – (1) – Nonoalco (1974)
- Prix Jean Prat – (3) – Speedy Dakota (1975), Dom Racine (1978), Night Alert (1980)
- Prix du Jockey Club – (1) – Hard to Beat (1972)
- Prix Lupin – (2) – Hard to Beat (1972), Persépolis (1982)
- Prix Marcel Boussac – (3) – Vela (1969), Play It Safe (1981), Midway Lady (1985)
- Prix Maurice de Gheest – (4) – Mountain Call (1968), Abergwaun (1972), Moorestyle (1981), College Chapel (1993)
- Prix Morny – (2) – My Swallow (1970), Nonoalco (1973)
- Prix du Moulin de Longchamp – (3) – Habitat (1969), Gold Rod (1970), Sparkler (1973)
- Prix Rothschild – (1) – Topsy (1979)
- Prix Royal-Oak – (1) – Ardross (1981)
- Prix Saint-Alary – (1) – Nobiliary (1975)
- Prix de la Salamandre – (2) – My Swallow (1970), Nonoalco (1973)
- Prix Vermeille – (1) – Aunt Edith (1965)

Germany

- Deutsches Derby – (3) – Orsini (1957), Fanfar (1963), Luciano (1967)
- Preis der Diana – (1) – On Dit (1967)
- Preis von Europa – (1) – Esprit du Nord (1983)

Ireland

- Irish 1,000 Guineas – (2) – Favoletta (1971), Godetia (1979)
- Irish 2,000 Guineas – (3) – Decies (1970), Jaazeiro (1978), Rodrigo de Triano (1992)
- Irish Champion Stakes – (3) – Malacate (1976), Inkerman (1978), Commanche Run (1985)
- Irish Derby – (5) – Meadow Court (1965), Ribocco (1967), Ribero (1968), The Minstrel (1977), Shergar (1981)
- Irish Oaks – (3) – Santa Tina (1970), Juliette Marny (1975), Godetia (1979)
- Irish St. Leger – (3) – Dan Kano (1967), Caucasus (1975), Meneval (1976)
- Matron Stakes – (1) – Kalamaika (1978)
- Moyglare Stud Stakes – (1) – Lemon Souffle (1993)
- National Stakes – (4) – Cellini (1973), Sir Wimborne (1975), El Prado (1991), Fatherland (1992)
- Phoenix Stakes – (1) – Getaway (1958)
- Pretty Polly Stakes – (3) – Mariel (1971), Godetia (1979), Calandra (1980)
- Tattersalls Gold Cup – (2) – Cavo Doro (1973), Elegant Air (1985)

Italy

- Derby Italiano – (3) – Bonconte di Montefeltro (1969), Cerreto (1973), Welnor (1984)
- Gran Criterium – (1) – Alhijaz (1991)
- Gran Premio del Jockey Club – (4) – Nagami (1958), Marco Visconti (1966), Awaasif (1983), Silvernesian (1992)
- Premio Presidente della Repubblica – (1) – Moulton (1973)
- Premio Roma – (3) – Irvine (1972), Noble Saint (1979), Old Country (1985)

Singapore

- Singapore Derby – (1) – Saas Fee (1979)
- Queen Elizabeth II Cup – (2) – Jumbo Jet (1972)

Slovakia

- Derby – (1) – Zimzalabim (1993)

United Kingdom

- 1,000 Guineas – (2) – Humble Duty (1970), Fairy Footsteps (1981)
- 2,000 Guineas – (5) – Crepello (1957), Sir Ivor (1968), Nijinsky (1970), Shadeed (1985), Rodrigo de Triano (1992)
- Ascot Gold Cup – (11) – Zarathustra (1957), Gladness (1958), Pandofell (1961), Twilight Alley (1963), Fighting Charlie (1965), Sagaro (1975, 1976 & 1977), Le Moss (1979), Ardross (1981 & 1982)
- Champion Stakes – (5) – Petite Etoile (1959), Pieces of Eight (1966), Sir Ivor (1968), Giacometti (1974), Rodrigo de Triano (1992)
- Cheveley Park Stakes – (4) – Fleet (1966), Lalibela (1967), Durtal (1976), Marwell (1980)
- Cork and Orrery Stakes (Golden Jubilee Stakes) – (9) – Right Boy (1958 & 1959), Tin Whistle (1960), El Gallo (1963), Mountain Call (1968), Welsh Saint (1970), Saritamer (1974), Thatching (1979), College Chapel (1993)
- Coronation Cup – (9) – Zucchero (1953), Nagami (1959), Petite Etoile (1960 & 1961), Park Top (1969), Roberto (1973), Quiet Fling (1976), Sea Chimes (1980), Be My Native (1983)
- Coronation Stakes – (5) – Aiming High (1961), Calve (1972), Lisadell (1974), Roussalka (1975), Chalon (1982)
- Derby – (9) – Never Say Die (1954), Crepello (1957), St. Paddy (1960), Sir Ivor (1968), Nijinsky (1970), Roberto (1972), Empery (1976), The Minstrel (1977), Teenoso (1983)
- Dewhurst Stakes – (10) – Crepello (1956), Follow Suit (1962), Ribofilio (1968), Nijinsky (1969), Crowned Prince (1971), Cellini (1973), The Minstrel (1976), Try My Best (1977), Monteverdi (1979), Diesis (1982)
- Eclipse Stakes – (7) – Mystery IX (1951), Darius (1955), Arctic Explorer (1957), St Paddy (1961), Pieces of Eight (1966), Wolver Hollow (1969), Artaius (1977)
- Falmouth Stakes – (7) – Sylphide (1957), Green Opal (1960), Chrona (1966), Vital Match (1969), Chalon (1982), Niche (1993), Lemon Souffle (1994)
- Fillies' Mile – (4) – Escorial (1973), Miss Pinkie (1976), Cherry Hinton (1977), Oh So Sharp (1984)
- Haydock Sprint Cup – (3) – Green God (1971), Abergwaun (1972), Moorestyle (1980)
- International Stakes – (5) – Dahlia (1974 & 1975), Hawaiian Sound (1978), Commanche Run (1985), Rodrigo de Triano (1992)
- July Cup – (10) – Vigo (1957), Right Boy (1958 & 1959), Tin Whistle (1960), Thatch (1973), Saritamer (1974), Solinus (1978), Thatching (1979), Moorestyle (1980), Mr Brooks (1992)
- King George VI and Queen Elizabeth Stakes – (7) – Meadow Court (1965), Aunt Edith (1966), Park Top (1969), Nijinsky (1970), Dahlia (1974), The Minstrel (1977), Teenoso (1984)
- King's Stand Stakes – (7) – Right Boy (1957), Majority Rule (1963), Swing Easy (1971), Abergwaun (1973), Godswalk (1977), Solinus (1978), Never So Bold (1985)
- Lockinge Stakes – (6) – Sovereign Path (1960), The Creditor (1964), Sparkler (1973), Belmont Bay (1981), Polar Falcon (1991), Swing Low (1993)
- Middle Park Stakes – (6) – Petingo (1967), Steel Heart (1974), Junius (1978), Mattaboy (1980), Cajun (1981), Diesis (1982)
- Nassau Stakes – (5) – Aunt Edith (1965), Haymaking (1966), Cheveley Princess (1973), Roussalka (1975 & 1976)
- Nunthorpe Stakes – (7) – Right Boy (1958 & 1959), Matatina (1963), Caterina (1966), Tower Walk (1969), Swing Easy (1971), Solinus (1978)
- Oaks – (6) – Carrozza (1957), Petite Etoile (1959), Valoris (1966), Juliette Marny (1975), Blue Wind (1981), Circus Plume (1984)
- Prince of Wales's Stakes – (3) – Gift Card (1973), Anne's Pretender (1976), Crimson Beau (1979)
- Queen Anne Stakes – (5) – Sparkler (1972), Baptism (1979), Belmont Bay (1981), Mr Fluorocarbon (1982), Trojan Fen (1984)
- Queen Elizabeth II Stakes – (4) – The Creditor (1963), Linacre (1964), Hill Rise (1966), To-Agori-Mou (1981)
- Racing Post Trophy – (5) – Ribocco (1966), Noble Decree (1972), Apalachee (1973), Dunbeath (1982), Lanfranco (1984)
- St. James's Palace Stakes – (5) – Roan Rocket (1964), Petingo (1968), Thatch (1973), Jaazeiro (1978), Bairn (1985)
- St. Leger – (8) – St Paddy (1960), Aurelius (1961), Ribocco (1967), Ribero (1968), Nijinsky (1970), Athens Wood (1971), Boucher (1972), Commanche Run (1984)
- Sun Chariot Stakes – (6) – Popkins (1970), Cheveley Princess (1973), Swiss Maid (1978), Topsy (1979), Snow (1980), Home on the Range (1981)
- Triumph Hurdle – (1) – Prince Charlemagne (1954)
- Sussex Stakes – (6) – Petite Etoile (1959), Roan Rocket (1964), Petingo (1968), Thatch (1973), Artaius (1977), Jaazeiro (1978)
- Yorkshire Oaks – (4) – Petite Etoile (1959), Parthian Glance (1966), Shoot A Line (1980), Awaasif (1982)

United States

- Breeders' Cup Mile – (1) – Royal Academy (1990)
- Washington, D.C. International – (3) – Sir Ivor (1968), Karabas (1969), Argument (1980)

== In popular culture ==
The British music band James recorded a song named "Sometimes (Lester Piggott)" on their 1993 album Laid. The outro on the original 12" of Sit Down (1989) also featured a falsetto voice singing the jockey's name. The 1990 Van Morrison song "In the Days Before Rock 'n Roll" also mentions Piggott by name: "When we let, then we bet / On Lester Piggott when we met [ten to one] / And we let the goldfish go".

In the Chas and Dave song "Gertcha", a list song that mentions causes of annoyance for the singer's Dad, he is mentioned : "Lester Piggott lost it by a neck".

Piggott was frequently caricatured on ITV's Spitting Image, in which he was portrayed as having mumbling diction, voiced by Enn Reitel.

In 1991, during a period in which Queen Elizabeth II faced public pressure to pay taxes, the satirical magazine Private Eye showed a cover picture of her talking on a telephone, asking for Lester Piggott.

== Bibliography ==
- Piggott, Lester (1996). Lester: The Autobiography of Lester Piggott. Transworld Publishers. ISBN 978-0-552-14153-6.
- Piggott, Lester; Magee, Sean (2004). Lester's Derbys. London: Methuen. ISBN 978-0-413-77411-8. ASIN 0413774112.

== See also ==
- List of jockeys
