= Carrozza =

British-bred Thoroughbred racehorse

- Sire: Dante
- Grandsire: Nearco
- Dam: Calash
- Damsire: Hyperion
- Sex: Mare
- Foaled: 1954 (age 70–71)
- Country: United Kingdom
- Colour: Dark bay or brown
- Breeder: National Stud
- Owner: Queen Elizabeth II
- Trainer: Noel Murless
- Record: 7: 3-0-0

Major wins
- Princess Elizabeth Stakes (1957); Epsom Oaks (1957)

Carrozza (foaled 1954) is a British Thoroughbred racehorse. In a racing career lasting from May 1956 until July 1957, the filly ran seven times and won three races for her owner Queen Elizabeth II. As a three-year-old she finished fourth in the 1000 Guineas at Newmarket before winning Oaks at Epsom. She was retired to stud after one further race and had some success as a broodmare.

== Background ==
Carrozza was a dark-coated bay or brown filly bred by the British national Stud and leased for racing purposes to the British monarch, Elizabeth II. The filly was sired by Dante the winner of the 1945 Epsom Derby out of the mare Calash, a daughter of Hyperion. Calash was a sister of the outstanding racemare Sun Chariot who won three Classics for King George VI in 1942, and of Sister Sarah, the grandam of Santa Claus.

The Queen sent her filly into training with Noel Murless at his Warren Place stables in Newmarket.

== Racing career ==
Carrozza began her racing career in May 1956 when she won the Rosemary Plate at Hurst Park Racecourse. The filly missed most of the season after falling in a training accident and injuring her back so severely that she was confined to her box for six weeks. Carrozza did not reappear until October, when she finished fourth in the Prendergast Stakes and fourth again in the Criterion Stakes at the same course two weeks later.

On her three-year-old debut, Carrozza contested the Princess Elizabeth Stakes at Epsom in April. She won the race, a trial for the fillies Classics, by defeating the highly regarded French filly Rose Royale by half a length. In the 1000 Guineas at Newmarket less than two weeks later, Carrozza started favourite at odds of 4/1 and finished fourth of the twenty runners behind Rose Royale, Sensualita and Angelet.

In the Oaks at Epsom a month later, Carrozza, ridden by Lester Piggott, started at odds of 100/8 in a field of eleven runners, being less fancied than the Queen's other runner, Mulberry Harbour. Piggott sent Carrozza into the lead a furlong from the finish and looked set for a comfortable win until the Irish-trained grey Silken Glider emerged with a late challenge. In a "desperate finish" the royal filly prevailed by a short head after a photo-finish. The favourite Rose Royale, who appeared unsuited by the firm ground, finished three lengths further back in third. Carrozza was led into the winner's circle by her owner: the filly was initially reluctant but acquiesced after the Queen gave the lead strap a "mighty jerk". Later in the year, Silken Glider was successful in the Irish Oaks, while Rose Royale won the Prix du Moulin and the Champion Stakes. In July, Carrozza started odds-on favourite for the Nassau Stakes at Goodwood, but finished fourth behind Swallowswift. Carrozza returned from the race lame and was retired to stud.

Carrozza's prize of £16,101 for winning the Oaks, enabled the Queen to be the leading owner in Britain in 1957.

== Retirement ==
Carrozza began her breeding career at the National stud, before being sold for 20,000 guineas to the British Bloodstock Agency in 1964. She produced three minor winners including Battle Wagon, who was exported to New Zealand where he sired the Wellington Cup winner Battle Heights. Carrozza's daughter, Caromata, produced the Grand Prix de Paris winner Matahawk. Carrozza was exported to the United States in 1966 and to Argentina in 1975.

== Assessment and honours ==
In their book, A Century of Champions, based on the Timeform rating system, John Randall and Tony Morris rated Carrozza an "inferior" winner of the Oaks.

== Pedigree ==
Pedigree of Carrozza (GB), bay or brown mare, 1954
Sire Dante (GB)	Nearco	Pharos	Phalaris
Sire Dante (GB)	Nearco	Pharos	Scapa Flow
Sire Dante (GB)	Nearco	Nogara	Havresac
Sire Dante (GB)	Nearco	Nogara	Catnip
Sire Dante (GB)	Rosy Legend	Dark Legend	Dark Ronald
Sire Dante (GB)	Rosy Legend	Dark Legend	Golden Legend
Sire Dante (GB)	Rosy Legend	Rosy Cheeks	Saint Just
Sire Dante (GB)	Rosy Legend	Rosy Cheeks	Purity
Dam Calash (GB)	Hyperion	Gainsborough	Bayardo
Dam Calash (GB)	Hyperion	Gainsborough	Rosedrop
Dam Calash (GB)	Hyperion	Selene	Chaucer
Dam Calash (GB)	Hyperion	Selene	Serenissima
Dam Calash (GB)	Clarence	Diligence	Hurry On
Dam Calash (GB)	Clarence	Diligence	Ecurie
Dam Calash (GB)	Clarence	Nun's Veil	Friar Marcus
Dam Calash (GB)	Clarence	Nun's Veil	Blanche (Family 3-o)
