= Darius (horse) =

British-bred Thoroughbred racehorse

- Sire: Dante
- Grandsire: Nearco
- Dam: Yasna
- Damsire: Dastur
- Sex: Stallion
- Foaled: 1951
- Country: United Kingdom
- Colour: Bay
- Breeder: Sir Percy Loraine, 12th Baronet
- Owner: Sir Percy Loraine
- Trainer: Harry Wragg
- Record: 21:9-8-2
- Earnings: £38,105

Major wins
- July Stakes (1953); Champagne Stakes (1953); 2000 Guineas (1954); St James's Palace Stakes (1954); Burwell Stakes (1955); Rose of York Stakes (1955); Eclipse Stakes (1955)

Awards
- Timeform rating 129

Darius (1951–1968) was a British Thoroughbred racehorse and sire, best known for winning the Classic 2000 Guineas in 1954. In a racing career which lasted from the spring of 1953 until November 1955 he ran twenty-one times, won nine races and was placed on ten occasions. He was one of the best British two-year-olds of his generation, winning four races including the July Stakes and the Champagne Stakes. In the following year he won the 2000 Guineas and the St James's Palace Stakes, finished second in the Eclipse Stakes and third in both The Derby and the King George VI and Queen Elizabeth Stakes. He won three more races as a four-year-old including the Eclipse Stakes. After a disappointing run in the Washington, D.C. International Stakes he was retired to stud where he had considerable success as a sire of winners.

== Background ==
Darius was a "good-looking" bay horse with one white foot, standing 16 hands high, bred by his owner Sir Percy Loraine. He was sired by the 1945 Derby winner Dante, from the same crop of foals which also produced The Oaks winner Carrozza. Darius was the best of nine winners produced by the broodmare Yasna. The colt was sent into training with the former champion jockey Harry Wragg at his Abington Place stable at Newmarket, Suffolk.

== Racing career ==
=== 1953:two-year-old season ===
After winning finishing second on his debut and winning one minor race, Darius was moved up in class for the Coventry Stakes over six furlongs at Royal Ascot and finished second to the Paddy Prendergast-trained The Pie King. Less than a month later Darius recorded his first important success when he won the July Stakes at Newmarket Racecourse. Starting at odds of 7/4 and ridden by Manny Mercer, who became his regular jockey, he won by a short head from Princely Gift. The colt won a Rous Memorial Stakes at Goodwood and was then sent to Doncaster in September where he added an impressive victory in the Champagne Stakes. At Newmarket in October he was expected to win the Middle Park Stakes, but finished second to Royal Challenger.

=== 1954:three-year-old season ===
On his three-year-old debut, Darius was beaten by Tudor Honey in the 2000 Guineas Trial Stakes at Kempton Park Racecourse in April. In the 2000 Guineas, run over the Rowley Mile course at Newmarket on 28 April, Darius started the 8/1 third favourite in a field of nineteen runners. Mercer restrained the colt in the early stages before producing him with a strong challenge, taking the lead in a furlong and a half from the finish. Darius and the French colt Ferriol drew clear of the field in the final stages, with the former prevailing by a length. Much of the credit for the win was given to his trainer Harry Wragg who had taken "endless trouble" with the colt's preparation, and ridden him in most of his exercise.

Darius was then moved up in distance to contest the Derby over one and a half miles at Epsom on 2 June. He was regarded as "the best horse in the race" and was the subject of heavy betting support which made him the 9/2 favourite on the day before the event, but his odds lengthened on the day and he started at 7/1. Darius ran well for much of the way, before finishing third of the twenty-two runners, beaten two lengths and a neck by Never Say Die and Arabian Night. Darius reverted to one mile at Royal Ascot and won the St James's Palace Stakes as the even money favourite, beating Umberto by a short head with Narrator in third. Two weeks later he raced against older horses for the first time in the Eclipse Stakes over ten furlongs at Sandown Park where he carried seven pounds more than weight-for-age and finished second to the four-year-old King of the Tudors. A week later he was moved up in distance again for the third running of the King George VI and Queen Elizabeth Stakes at Ascot and finished third of the seventeen runners behind the Queen's horse Aureole, reportedly showing "great courage" on unsuitably soft ground.

=== 1955:four-year-old season ===
In the winter of 1954/5 Darius was sent to race in the United States, but never reached the track. He was being prepared for a run against Determine in the Santa Anita Maturity in January but sustained a sprained ligament in training and was returned to Europe.

Darius eventually began his third season by finishing second by a short head to Narrator in the March Stakes at Newmarket and then won the Burwell Stakes over one and a half miles at the same venue, winning for the first time at a distance beyond a mile. At Epsom in June he ran in the Coronation Cup and again finished second to Narrator over one and a half miles. Darius and Narrator met for the third time in the Eclipse Stakes in July. Ridden by Lester Piggott Darius started the 11/10 favourite and won by two lengths from Coronation Year, with Narrator in third. He was then moved back up in distance for the King George VI and Queen Elizabeth Stakes but finished unplaced behind the French-trained colt Vimy. Darius won the Rose of York Stakes in August, beating his stable companion Immortal by a head and was then rested until the autumn.

At Newmarket in October he finished second to the French colt Hafiz II in the Champion Stakes. On his final appearance, Darius was one of two British runners sent to the United States to contest the fourth running of the Washington, D.C. International Stakes at Laurel Park Racecourse. He finished unplaced behind the Venezuelan four-year-old El Chama.

== Assessment ==
The independent Timeform organisation awarded Darius a best annual rating of 129. In their book A Century of Champions, based on a modified version of the Timeform system, John Randall and Tony Morris rated Darius an "average" winner of the 2000 Guineas.

== Stud record ==
Darius was retired to stud and proved to be a successful breeding stallion. The best of his progeny included Pia (Epsom Oaks), Pola Bella (Poule d'Essai des Pouliches, Prix du Moulin), Derring-Do, Dart Board (Dewhurst Stakes) and Varano (Derby Italiano). Darius was diagnosed with stomach cancer and was euthanised on 13 August 1968 at the Highclere Stud in Berkshire.

== Pedigree ==
Pedigree of Darius (GB), bay stallion, 1951
Sire Dante (GB)	Nearco (ITY)	Pharos	Phalaris
Sire Dante (GB)	Nearco (ITY)	Pharos	Scapa Flow
Sire Dante (GB)	Nearco (ITY)	Nogara	Havresac
Sire Dante (GB)	Nearco (ITY)	Nogara	Catnip
Sire Dante (GB)	Rosy Legend (FR)	Dark Legend	Dark Ronald
Sire Dante (GB)	Rosy Legend (FR)	Dark Legend	Golden Legend
Sire Dante (GB)	Rosy Legend (FR)	Rosy Cheeks	Saint Just
Sire Dante (GB)	Rosy Legend (FR)	Rosy Cheeks	Purity
Dam Yasna (GB)	Dastur (GB)	Solario	Gainsborough
Dam Yasna (GB)	Dastur (GB)	Solario	Sun Worship
Dam Yasna (GB)	Dastur (GB)	Friar's Daughter	Friar Marcus
Dam Yasna (GB)	Dastur (GB)	Friar's Daughter	Garron Lass
Dam Yasna (GB)	Ariadne (GB)	Arion	Valens
Dam Yasna (GB)	Ariadne (GB)	Arion	Post Horn
Dam Yasna (GB)	Ariadne (GB)	Security	Simon Square
Dam Yasna (GB)	Ariadne (GB)	Security	Trust (Family 1-t)
