= Never Say Die (horse) =

American-bred, British-trained Thoroughbred racehorse

- Sire: Nasrullah
- Grandsire: Nearco
- Dam: Singing Grass
- Damsire: War Admiral
- Sex: Colt
- Foaled: 1951
- Country: United States
- Colour: Chestnut
- Breeder: Robert Sterling Clark
- Owner: Robert Sterling Clark
- Trainer: Joseph Lawson
- Record: 12: 3-1-3
- Earnings: £31,147

Major wins
- Epsom Derby (1954); St. Leger Stakes (1954)

Awards
- Leading sire in Great Britain and Ireland (1962); Top-rated horse of 1954; Timeform rating: 137
- Last updated on 4 June 2022

Never Say Die (1951–1975) was an American-bred, British-trained Thoroughbred racehorse. After winning only once from his first nine races, he demonstrated much improved form in the summer of 1954 to win the Derby, becoming the first American-bred colt to win the race in 73 years. Later that year he added a second British Classic, when winning the St. Leger Stakes by a record margin of twelve lengths. He was later retired to a successful stud career.

== Background ==
Never Say Die was a chestnut colt with a white blaze and three white feet, bred and raced by the American philanthropist and art collector Robert Sterling Clark. At the time of his Derby win, the horse stood 15.3 1/2 hands high. He was conceived in Ireland but foaled at Jonabell Farm (which was leased at the time from the famed Hamburg Place) in Kentucky. His sire, Nasrullah had been a talented but temperamental racehorse who was beginning to have an impact as a stallion. Never Say Die's dam, Singing Grass won seven unimportant races in England. Clark sent the colt to England as a yearling to be trained by Joseph Lawson, who had already won nine Classics Clark's other British trainer, Harry Peacock had been given first choice of the owner's yearlings but had rejected Never Say Die because of his low opinion of Nasrullah's stock.

== Racing career ==
=== 1953:two-year-old season ===
In six races as a two-year-old, Never Say Die showed some good form but appeared to be somewhat below the best of his generation. He won the six furlong Rosslyn Stakes at Ascot Racecourse in July and finished third in both the Richmond Stakes and Dewhurst Stakes. In the Free Handicap, a rating of the year's best British juveniles, Never Say Die was allotted a weight of 115 pounds, eighteen pounds below the top-rated The Pie King.

=== 1954:three-year-old season ===
Never Say Die made good physical progress over the winter, but showed little improvement in his first two starts. He finished second in the Union Jack Stakes at Aintree Racecourse and then finished unplaced in the Free Handicap at Newmarket in April. On his final trial race for The Derby, Never Say Die returned to Newmarket and was moved up in distance for the Newmarket Stakes over ten furlongs. Ridden by Manny Mercer, he took the lead a furlong out but was overtaken in the closing stages and finished third to Elopement and Golden God.

On a dull, chilly day at Epsom, Never Say Die started a 33/1 outsider in a field of twenty-two runners for the Derby. According to some accounts, he would have started at even longer odds if his memorable name and the publicity attracted by his eighteen-year-old jockey Lester Piggott had not made him a popular choice with many members of the public. The colt was always well-placed and was sent into the lead early in the straight by Piggott. He won comfortably by two lengths from Arabian Night and Darius. Clark was ill in New York hospital and unable to attend the race, which saw Never Say Die becoming the first American-bred Derby winner since Iroquois in 1881. Never Say Die next contested the King Edward VII Stakes at Ascot Racecourse. In an extremely rough and unsatisfactory race he finished fourth behind Rashleigh. Piggott was immediately suspended by the racecourse stewards for his riding of Never Say Die and was reported to the Jockey Club who extended the riding ban to six months.

The suspended Piggott was replaced by Charlie Smirke for Never Say Die's run in the St Leger at Doncaster in September. The colt started 100/30 favourite in a field of sixteen. He won very easily by twelve lengths, the biggest winning margin officially recorded in the race's history. He was retired to stud shortly after his win at Doncaster.

== Assessment ==
Timeform awarded Never Say Die a rating of 137, the highest for any horse in 1954. A rating of 130 is considered the mark of an above average European Group One winner.

In their book A Century of Champions, John Randall and Tony Morris rated Never Say Die a “superior” Derby winner and the fifty-third best British racehorse of the 20th Century .

== Stud record ==
On retirement, Clark gave him to the British National Stud. He was champion sire in 1962, thanks to Larkspur's Derby victory. He also sired The Oaks and 1,000 Guineas winner Never Too Late and other good winners in Die Hard and Sostenuto, stayers who both won the Ebor Handicap.

Never say Die was put down in 1975, by which time his stock had won 309 races worth more than £400,000 in Great Britain. He is buried in The National Stud's horse cemetery.

== Pedigree ==
Pedigree of Never Say Die, chestnut stallion 1951
Sire Nasrullah	Nearco	Pharos	Phalaris
Sire Nasrullah	Nearco	Pharos	Scapa Flow
Sire Nasrullah	Nearco	Nogara	Havresac
Sire Nasrullah	Nearco	Nogara	Catnip
Sire Nasrullah	Mumtaz Begum	Blenheim	Blandford
Sire Nasrullah	Mumtaz Begum	Blenheim	Malva
Sire Nasrullah	Mumtaz Begum	Mumtaz Mahal	The Tetrarch
Sire Nasrullah	Mumtaz Begum	Mumtaz Mahal	Lady Josephine
Dam Singing Grass	War Admiral	Man O'War	Fair Play
Dam Singing Grass	War Admiral	Man O'War	Mahubah
Dam Singing Grass	War Admiral	Brushup	Sweep
Dam Singing Grass	War Admiral	Brushup	Annette K.
Dam Singing Grass	Boreale	Vatout	Prince Chimay
Dam Singing Grass	Boreale	Vatout	Vashti
Dam Singing Grass	Boreale	Galaday	Sir Gallahad III
Dam Singing Grass	Boreale	Galaday	Sunstep (Family 1-n)
