= Rebecca Sharp (horse) =

British-bred Thoroughbred racehorse

Rebecca Sharp is a thoroughbred racehorse. She was owned by Anthony Oppenheimer, trained by Geoff Wragg and won the 1997 G1 Royal Ascot Coronation Stakes under jockey Michael Hills. The win was a major upset, as Rebecca Sharp had 25-1 odds of winning over the favorite Sleepytime.
