= Royal Academy (horse) =

American-bred, Irish-trained Thoroughbred racehorse

- Sire: Nijinsky
- Grandsire: Northern Dancer
- Dam: Crimson Saint
- Damsire: Crimson Satan
- Sex: Stallion
- Foaled: 1987
- Country: United States
- Colour: Bay
- Breeder: Tim Gentry
- Owner: Classic Thoroughbred Plc
- Trainer: Vincent O'Brien
- Record: 7: 4–2–0
- Earnings: $ 724,167

Major wins
- July Cup (1990); Tetrarch Stakes (1990); Breeders' Cup wins: Breeders' Cup Mile (1990)

Awards
- Timeform rating: 130
- Last updated on 12 July 2022

Royal Academy (21 February 1987 – 22 February 2012) was an American-bred, Irish-trained Thoroughbred racehorse. Bought by trainer Vincent O'Brien at the 1988 Keeneland Sales for $3.5 million, the colt was best known as the winner of the 1990 Breeders' Cup Mile in which famed British jockey Lester Piggott came out of retirement to ride him. Royal Academy also won the 1990 July Cup at Newmarket. He was a son of the great racehorse and sire Nijinsky, whom he resembled in conformation and temperament.

Royal Academy was retired to stud in 1991. Between 1991–95 and in 1997 he was based at Coolmore Stud Ireland. He was shuttled in 1994–99 and 2002–09 to Australia. He was at stud in 1996 in Japan and in 2000–07 at Ashford Stud in Versailles, Kentucky. He was also shuttled in 2000–01 to Brazil. According to statistics compiled by The Jockey Club, Royal Academy sired 1481 winners (56.8%) and 167 stakes winners (6.4%) from 2609 named foals. A highly successful sire, among others he sired 2001 Breeders' Cup Mile winner Val Royal, Bullish Luck who in 2006 was voted Hong Kong Horse of the Year and had career earnings of $6,435,501, and Bel Esprit, the sire of Black Caviar who was rated the best sprinter in the world in 2010, 2011, 2012 and 2013. He sired a British Classic winner in the filly Sleepytime, who won the 1000 Guineas in 1997. Royal Academy was also damsire of the Australian champion sire, Fastnet Rock.

Royal Academy was retired from stud duty in 2010 and died of natural causes on 22 February 2012 at the Coolmore Stud in Australia.
