= Dante (horse) =

British-bred Thoroughbred racehorse

- Sire: Nearco
- Grandsire: Pharos
- Dam: Rosy Legend
- Damsire: Dark Legend
- Sex: Stallion
- Foaled: 1942
- Country: Great Britain
- Colour: Brown
- Breeder: Sir Eric Ohlson
- Owner: Sir Eric Ohlson
- Trainer: Matthew Peacock
- Record: 9: 8-1-0
- Earnings: £11,990

Major wins
- Coventry Stakes (1944); Middle Park Stakes (1944); Derby Stakes (1945)

Honours
- Dante Stakes at York Racecourse

Dante (1942–1956) was a British Thoroughbred racehorse who was the last horse trained in northern England to win the English Derby. In a racing career which lasted from the spring of 1944 until June 1945 he ran nine times and won eight races. He was the top-rated British two-year-old of 1944 when he was unbeaten in six races including the Coventry Stakes and the Middle Park Stakes. In 1945 he was beaten when favourite for the 2000 Guineas but won the Derby, despite being afflicted by an eye condition which eventually left him completely blind. He was retired to a successful stud career before dying in 1956.

== Background ==
Dante was a brown horse with a small white star and one white foot, bred and owned by Sir Eric Ohlson at Manor House Stud in Middleham in North Yorkshire. His dam, Rosy Legend won four races in her native France before being sent to England as a four-year-old. In 1941 she was covered by the stallion Nearco and conceived the foal who would become Dante. In Autumn she was offered for sale following the death of her owner, Lord Furness and was bought for 3,500 guineas by Ohlson. She later went on to produce Dante's full brother Sayajirao, who won the St. Leger Stakes in 1947. Nearco went on to be the Champion sire in 1947 and 1949, and one of the most important sires of the 20th century.

Dante was sent into training with Matthew Peacock at Middleham.

== Racing career ==
=== 1944: two-year-old season ===
At age two, the colt went undefeated in six starts, and became "the idol of the North". In June he won the Coventry Stakes by four lengths. The race was run at Newmarket Racecourse instead of its customary venue of Royal Ascot because of wartime restrictions. In Autumn, he returned to Newmarket and won the Middle Park Stakes by two lengths. In the Free Handicap, a ranking of the year's best two-year-olds, Dante was rated the best British juvenile of 1944, one pound ahead of Court Martial.

=== 1945: three-year-old season ===
At age three, Dante attracted a large crowd for his reappearance in the Roseberry Stakes at Stockton Racecourse in April and won impressively by four lengths at odds of 1/10. After the race, his jockey, the Chorlton-cum-Hardy-born Billy Nevett called him "the finest horse I have ever ridden". He was then sent to Newmarket for the 2,000 Guineas and started even money favourite in a field of twenty runners, despite reports that he had suffered an eye problem two days before the race. It was initially thought that he had been injured by a piece of grit: in fact he was suffering the early stages of a degenerative disease which eventually blinded him. In an upset, he was beaten a neck by Court Martial with another son of Nearco, Royal Charger, two lengths away in third.

In June, Dante started favourite at odds of 100/30 for the Derby Stakes, which was run at Newmarket despite the recent end of the war. The race attracted a crowd of 30,000, the largest for a "wartime" Derby and was attended by the King and Queen. Court Martial, regarded as a doubtful stayer on pedigree grounds, was sent off at odds of 100/9 with twenty-five other colts in opposition. Ridden by Nevett, Dante was towards the rear of the field in the early stages but accelerated past the opposition in the final quarter mile and won by two lengths from Midas, who beat Court Martial by a head for second place. Dante was the first Northern horse to win the Derby since Pretender in 1869, and his victory was received with "great rejoicing" in Yorkshire.

Following his Derby win, Dante was made odds-on favourite for the St Leger. In August, rumours about Dante's condition began to circulate, and on 25 August Peacock withdrew the horse as he said that the colt could not be "made good" in time for the race. It was reported that the colt was suffering from "leg stiffness" which did not respond to treatment. Dante never ran again and was retired to stud.

== Assessment and honours ==
In their book A Century of Champions, John Randall and Tony Morris rated Dante a "superior" Derby winner, and the thirty-ninth best horse trained in Britain or Ireland in the 20th century.

Phil Bull, the founder of Timeform, called Dante "one of the best horses of the century".

== Stud record ==
Retired to Theakston Stud in Theakston, North Yorkshire, Dante proved a successful sire whose offspring included:

- Toulouse Lautrec (b. 1950) - won Gran Premio d'Italia, Gran Premio di Milano
- Darius (b. 1951) - won Champagne Stakes (1953), July Stakes (1953), 2,000 Guineas (1954), St. James's Palace Stakes (1954), Eclipse Stakes (1955)
- Carrozza (b. 1954) - won Epsom Oaks for owner, Queen Elizabeth II
- Discorea (b. 1956) - won 1959 Irish Oaks

Dante died in 1956 and was buried at the Theakston Stud. The Dante Stakes at York Racecourse is named in his honour. There is also A Locomotive named in His Honour.

== Pedigree ==
Pedigree of Dante, brown stallion, 1942
Sire Nearco (ITY)	Pharos	Phalaris	Polymelus
Sire Nearco (ITY)	Pharos	Phalaris	Bromus
Sire Nearco (ITY)	Pharos	Scapa Flow	Chaucer
Sire Nearco (ITY)	Pharos	Scapa Flow	Anchora
Sire Nearco (ITY)	Nogara	Havresac	Rabelais
Sire Nearco (ITY)	Nogara	Havresac	Hors Concours
Sire Nearco (ITY)	Nogara	Catnip	Spearmint
Sire Nearco (ITY)	Nogara	Catnip	Sibola
Dam Rosy Legend (FR)	Dark Legend	Dark Ronald	Bay Ronald
Dam Rosy Legend (FR)	Dark Legend	Dark Ronald	Darkie
Dam Rosy Legend (FR)	Dark Legend	Golden Legend	Amphion
Dam Rosy Legend (FR)	Dark Legend	Golden Legend	St Lucre
Dam Rosy Legend (FR)	Rosy Cheeks	Saint Just	St Frusquin
Dam Rosy Legend (FR)	Rosy Cheeks	Saint Just	Justitia
Dam Rosy Legend (FR)	Rosy Cheeks	Purity	Gallinule
Dam Rosy Legend (FR)	Rosy Cheeks	Purity	Sanctimony (Family 3-n)

== See also ==
- List of leading Thoroughbred racehorses
