= Bold Lad (Irish horse) =

Irish-bred Thoroughbred racehorse

- Sire: Bold Ruler
- Grandsire: Nasrullah
- Dam: Barn Pride
- Damsire: Democratic
- Sex: Stallion
- Foaled: 1964
- Country: Ireland
- Colour: Bay
- Breeder: Lady Granard
- Owner: Lady Granard
- Trainer: Paddy Prendergast
- Record: 9: 5-1-1
- Earnings: £24,790

Major wins
- Youngsters Stakes (1966); Coventry Stakes (1966); Champagne Stakes (1966); Middle Park Stakes (1966); Tetrarch Stakes (1967)

Awards
- Top-rated British Two-year-old (1966); Timeform Top-rated Two-year-old (1966)

Bold Lad (1964 – 17 October 1986) was an Irish Thoroughbred racehorse and sire. In a career which lasted from May 1966 until June 1967 he ran nine times and won five races. Bold Lad was unbeaten in 1966 and was the highest-rated two-year-old of the season in the United Kingdom and Ireland. He failed to reproduce his best form in 1967, but went on to be a successful stallion.

== Background ==
Bold Lad was a bay horse with a small white star standing 16 hands high. He was bred in Ireland by American-born Beatrice Mills Forbes, 8th Countess of Granard, sister of Gladys Mills Phipps and Ogden L. Mills who owned his sire, Bold Ruler, an eight-time Leading sire in North America. Bold Lad's dam, Barn Pride, was a descendant of the mare Edvina, a member of family 2-e and the ancestor of the 2000 Guineas winner Martial. The colt was sent into training with Paddy Prendergast at his stables near the Curragh in Ireland.

In 1962 Bold Ruler had sired another Champion Two-Year-Old Colt named Bold Lad who raced in the United States for owner/breeders Gladys Mills Phipps and Ogden L. Mills.

== Racing career ==
=== 1966:two-year-old season ===
Bold Lad began his career by winning the Youngsters Stakes in Ireland and was then sent to Royal Ascot to contest the Coventry Stakes at Royal Ascot in which he defeated a field which included Royal Palace. He won the Champagne Stakes at Doncaster defeating the previously unbeaten Ribocco, after which Prendergast described him as the best two-year-old he had ever trained, including Windy City. In September he won the Middle Park Stakes at Newmarket. In the Free Handicap, a ranking of the season's best juveniles, he was rated three pounds clear of runner-up Royal Palace giving him Champion honors in Ireland and England.

=== 1967:three-year-old season ===
Bold Lad began his three-year-old campaign with a win in the Tetrarch Stakes at The Curragh in Ireland. Sent to England, he was the 100/30 joint-favorite with Royal Palace going into the Classic 2,000 Guineas Stakes at Newmarket. He finished unplaced behind Royal Palace and Taj Dewan, having been denied a clear run in the closing stages. Bold Lad then started favourite for the Lockinge Stakes at Newbury but was beaten three-quarters of a length by the Irish-trained four-year-old Bluerullah. In the last race of his career, ran third to Reform (horse in Ascot's St. James's Palace Stakes at Royal Ascot.

== Assessment ==
Bold Lad was given a Timeform rating of 133 as a two-year-old in 1966. In the same year he finished third in the voting for British Horse of the Year behind the three-year-olds Charlottown and Sodium.

== Stud career ==
Retired to stud at a fee of 400 guineas, Bold Lad made a "spectacular" start to his breeding career, siring the 1000 Guineas winner Waterloo in his first crop of foals. He also sired the leading sprinters Boldboy and Never So Bold, the Richmond Stakes winner Persian Bold (sire of Kooyonga) and Ballad Rock, the sire of Chief Singer.

== Pedigree ==
Pedigree of Bold Lad (IRE)
Sire Bold Ruler	Nasrullah	Nearco	Pharos
Sire Bold Ruler	Nasrullah	Nearco	Nogara
Sire Bold Ruler	Nasrullah	Mumtaz Begum	Blenheim
Sire Bold Ruler	Nasrullah	Mumtaz Begum	Mumtaz Mahal
Sire Bold Ruler	Miss Disco	Discovery	Display
Sire Bold Ruler	Miss Disco	Discovery	Ariadne
Sire Bold Ruler	Miss Disco	Out Done	Pompey
Sire Bold Ruler	Miss Disco	Out Done	Sweep Out
Dam Barn Pride	Democratic	Denturius	Gold Bridge
Dam Barn Pride	Democratic	Denturius	La Solfatara
Dam Barn Pride	Democratic	Light Fantasy	Signal Light
Dam Barn Pride	Democratic	Light Fantasy	Last Act
Dam Barn Pride	Fair Alycia	Alycidon	Donatello
Dam Barn Pride	Fair Alycia	Alycidon	Aurora
Dam Barn Pride	Fair Alycia	Fair Edwine	Fair Trial
Dam Barn Pride	Fair Alycia	Fair Edwine	Edvina (Family 2-e)
