= Nikoli (horse) =

Irish Thoroughbred racehorse

- Sire: Great Nephew
- Grandsire: Honeyway
- Dam: Aliceva
- Damsire: Alcide
- Sex: Stallion
- Foaled: 8 March 1977
- Country: Ireland
- Colour: Bay
- Breeder: McGrath Trust Co.
- Owner: Lord Iveagh
- Trainer: Paddy Prendergast; Kevin Prendergast
- Record: 5: 3-0-0

Major wins
- McCairns Trial Stakes (1980); Irish 2000 Guineas (1980)

Awards
- Timeform rating 96p (1979), 125 (1980); Top-rated Irish-trained three-year-old (1980)

Nikoli (foaled 8 March 1977) was an Irish Thoroughbred racehorse and sire. After winning his only race as a juvenile he won the McCairns Trial Stakes on his three-year-old debut and then recorded his biggest win in the Irish 2000 Guineas. He started favourite for the 1980 Epsom Derby but finished eighth and ran poorly on his only subsequent start. After his retirement from racing he stood as a breeding stallion in the United States and Uruguay but had little success as a sire of winners.

== Background ==
Nikoli was a "strong, most attractive" bay horse with no white markings bred in Ireland by the McGrath Trust Co. at the Brownstown Stud. As a yearling he was put up for auction and sold for 52,000 guineas. He entered the ownership of Lord Iveagh and was sent into training with the veteran Paddy Prendergast.

He was sired by Great Nephew, a British stallion who won the Prix du Moulin in 1967 before becoming an outstanding sire whose other progeny included Grundy, Mrs Penny, Shergar, Tolmi and Carotene. His dam Aliceva made little impact as a racehorse but produced several other winners including Captain James (Waterford Crystal Mile) and Sutton Place (Coronation Stakes). She was a half-sister to Feemoss, the dam of Levmoss, Le Moss and Sweet Mimosa (Prix de Diane).

== Racing career ==
=== 1979: two-year-old season ===
Nikoli made his racecourse debut in a seven furlong maiden race at Phoenix Park Racecourse in October. He started favourite and won by three quarters of a length from Musical Boy after taking the lead in the closing stages.

=== 1980: three-year-old season ===
On his first appearance as a three-year-old Nikoli contested the Group Three McCairns Trial Stakes over seven furlongs on soft ground at Phoenix Park. Most of the interest in the race focused on the Vincent O'Brien-trained Monteverdi, the top-rated juvenile of 1979 in Britain and Ireland who was made the 1/3 favourite. Nikoli, however, upset the odds, winning by a length and a half from Monteverdi, who was carrying seven pounds more. The ground was much firmer when Nikoli was stepped up to Group One level for the Irish 2000 Guineas over one mile at the Curragh on 17 May and started the 5/1 third favourite behind Monteverdi and Posse. The other ten runners included Final Straw (who had beaten Monteverdi in the Greenham Stakes), Huguenot (Beresford Stakes), Last Fandango (Blue Riband Trial Stakes), Current Charge (Tetrarch Stakes) and Johnny O'Day (Larkspur Stakes). Final Straw, Nikoli, Last Fandango and Posse entered the final furlong almost level, but Nikoli, ridden by Christy Roche stayed on better than his rivals and won by a short head from Last Fandango.

Nikoli's win at the Curragh made him a leading contender for The Derby and he received considerable sentimental support as his highly respected trainer was terminally ill and unlikely to saddle another runner in the race. Concerns were expressed however about the colt's ability to handle the course and his nervous temperament. At Epsom he started the 4/1 favourite for the Derby but never looked likely to win, finishing eighth behind Henbit. Paddy Prendergast died on 20 June and his son Kevin took over as Nikoli's trainer. In the Irish Derby at the Curragh on 28 June, the colt was made the second favourite but became highly agitated before the start and finished unplaced behind Tyrnavos.

In the latter part of 1980 the ownership of Nikoli was the subject of a lengthy legal dispute which was eventually settled out of court in November. The colt never ran again and was retired to stud at the end of the year.

== Assessment ==
In the Irish Free Handicap for the two-year-olds of 1979 Nikoli was assigned a weight of 108 pounds, 25 pounds behind the top-rated Monteverdi. The independent Timeform organisation gave him a rating of 96p, the "p" indicationg that he was likely to make more than normal progress. In their annual Racehorses of 1983 Timeform described him as "a well-related colt who will make into a smart 3-y-o over 1m or more". In the International Classification for 1980 Nikoli was rated on 85, six pounds behind the top-rated Moorestyle and was the highest-rated Irish three-year-old. Timeform gave him a rating of 125, eleven pounds behind Moorestyle, who was their Horse of the Year.

== Stud record ==
At the end of his racing career, Nikoli was exported to the United States to become a breeding stallion. He was moved to stand in Uruguay in the late 1980s. The best of his offspring included Air Display who won the Volante Handicap in 1986.

== Breeding ==
Pedigree of Nikoli (IRE), bay colt, 1977
Sire Great Nephew (GB) 1963	Honeyway (GB); 1941	Fairway	Phalaris
Sire Great Nephew (GB) 1963	Honeyway (GB); 1941	Fairway	Scapa Flow
Sire Great Nephew (GB) 1963	Honeyway (GB); 1941	Honey Buzzard	Papyrus
Sire Great Nephew (GB) 1963	Honeyway (GB); 1941	Honey Buzzard	Lady Peregrine
Sire Great Nephew (GB) 1963	Sybil's Niece (GB); 1951	Admiral's Walk	Hyperion
Sire Great Nephew (GB) 1963	Sybil's Niece (GB); 1951	Admiral's Walk	Tabaris
Sire Great Nephew (GB) 1963	Sybil's Niece (GB); 1951	Sybil's Sister	Nearco
Sire Great Nephew (GB) 1963	Sybil's Niece (GB); 1951	Sybil's Sister	Sister Sarah
Dam Aliceva (IRE) 1966	Alcide (GB); 1955	Alycidon	Donatello
Dam Aliceva (IRE) 1966	Alcide (GB); 1955	Alycidon	Aurora
Dam Aliceva (IRE) 1966	Alcide (GB); 1955	Chenille	King Salmon
Dam Aliceva (IRE) 1966	Alcide (GB); 1955	Chenille	Sweet Aloe
Dam Aliceva (IRE) 1966	Feevagh (FR); 1951	Solar Slipper	Windsor Slipper
Dam Aliceva (IRE) 1966	Feevagh (FR); 1951	Solar Slipper	Solar Flower
Dam Aliceva (IRE) 1966	Feevagh (FR); 1951	Astrid Wood	Bois Roussel
Dam Aliceva (IRE) 1966	Feevagh (FR); 1951	Astrid Wood	Astrid (Family 1-k)
