= Nikoli =

Nikoli may refer to:

- Nikoli (horse), an Irish racehorse
- Nikoli (publisher), a Japanese publisher of puzzle games

== People with the name ==
- Nikoli Edwards (born 1991), Trinidad and Tobago politician
- Elena Nikoli (born 1982), Greek handball player
- Hadji Nikoli (1826–1892), Bulgarian merchant and patriot

== See also ==
- Nikola (disambiguation)
