= Little Wolf (horse) =

British-bred Thoroughbred racehorse

- Sire: Grundy
- Grandsire: Great Nephew
- Dam: Hiding Place
- Damsire: Doutelle
- Sex: Stallion
- Foaled: 23 March 1978
- Country: United Kingdom
- Colour: Chestnut
- Breeder: Lord Porchester
- Owner: Lord Porchester
- Trainer: Dick Hern
- Record: 16:7-3-4

Major wins
- Scottish Derby (1981); St Simon Stakes (1981); Prix Jean de Chaudenay (1982); Jockey Club Cup (1982); Ascot Gold Cup (1983); Goodwood Cup (1983)

Awards
- Timeform Best Stayer (1983); Gilbey Champion Stayer (1983); Timeform rating: 88P (1980), 117 (1981), 124 (1982), 127 (1983)

Little Wolf (foaled 23 March 1978) was a British Thoroughbred racehorse and sire. He was best known for his performances in staying races, but was also capable of winning important races over middle distances. Little Wolf was lightly campaigned, running sixteen times between October 1980 and May 1984 and winning seven races. After winning his only race as a two-year-old he won two of his five races including the Scottish Derby and St Simon Stakes in 1981. In the following year he won the Prix Jean de Chaudenay in France before establishing himself as a high-class stayer with an emphatic win in the Jockey Club Cup. In 1983 he won Britain' most prestigious long-distance race, the Gold Cup at Royal Ascot and followed up with a record-breaking win in the Goodwood Cup. He was injured in his only subsequent race and was retired to stud where he made no impact as a sire of winners.

== Background ==
Little Wolf was a "strong, close-coupled, quite attractive" chestnut horse with a broad white blaze and a white sock on his left hind leg bred by his owner Lord Porchester. Porchester, later the 7th Earl of Carnarvon, owned the Highclere Stud and served as racing manager to Queen Elizabeth II from 1969. Little Wolf was from the second crop of foals sired by Grundy, an outstanding racehorse who won The Derby and the King George VI and Queen Elizabeth Stakes in 1975. Grundy sired several other good winners, but his stock tended to be slow-maturing stayers and he was sold and exported to Japan in 1983. Little Wolf's dam Hiding Place was a half-sister of Queen's Hussar (the sire of Brigadier Gerard and Highclere) and also produced Smuggler (winner of the Princess of Wales's Stakes) and Sanctuary, the dam of the Breeders' Cup Sprint winner Sheikh Albadou. Little Wolf was trained throughout his racing career by Dick Hern at West Ilsley in Berkshire.

== Racing career ==
=== 1980: two-year-old season ===
Little Wolf ran only once as a two-year-old, when contesting a maiden race over six furlongs at Newbury Racecourse in October. He started slowly but won by one and a half lengths from Casa Esquillina and twenty-three others. In their annual Racehorses of 1980, Timeform described the colt as an "interesting prospect" who was "sure to make a good colt over middle distances".

=== 1981: three-year-old season ===
Little Wolf began his three-year-old season at Newmarket Racecourse in spring when he ran in the ten furlong Heathorn Stakes, an early trial race for the Epsom Derby. He appeared to be less than fully fit but finished well and finished third behind Shotgun. Any hopes that the colt would develop into a Derby contender were ended when he was sidelined by a viral infection.

After a break of two and a half months, Little Wolf returned in the Scottish Derby over eleven furlong in July. Ridden by Graham Sexton he started at odds of 5/1 and won by a neck from Six Mile Bottom after leading for most of the race. The colt then showed good form in defeat when finishing second to Glint of Gold in the Great Voltigeur Stakes at York Racecourse. In September he was matched against older horses for the first time in the Cumberland Lodge Stakes at Ascot and finished third behind Critique and Fingal's Cave. On his final appearance of the season, Little Wolf started the 7/4 favourite for the St Simon Stakes over one and a half miles at Newbury in October. Sexton settled the colt in the middle of the field before moving steadily forward in the straight. In the final quarter mile the race developed into a contest between Little Wolf and Baffin (also trained by Dick Hern), with the favourite prevailing by a neck after what Timeform described as a "tremendous tussle".

=== 1982: four-year-old season ===
As a four-year-old, Little Wolf began to be campaigned over longer distances and was ridden regularly by the Scottish jockey Willie Carson. He began his season in the fourteen furlong Yorkshire Cup at York in May when he ran well to finish third behind the dominant stayer Ardross, beaten just over a length. He then travelled abroad for the first time when he contested the Prix Jean de Chaudenay over 2400 metres at Saint-Cloud Racecourse. He took the lead in the straight and held off the late challenge of the French colt Le Mamamouchi to win by a neck. In July he was sent to Germany and finished second to Orofino in the Grosser Preis von Berlin, after which Carson offered the opinion that the 2,400m distance was too short for the colt to show his best form.

At Newmarket in October, Little Wolf was moved up in distance for the Jockey Club Cup over two miles. Ridden by Carson he carried top weight in the Group Three race and started 9/4 favourite. He appeared to be struggling at one point but moved through to take the lead three furlong from the finish and drew away from the field to win by six lengths from Halsbury, with the Irish horse Ore three lengths away in third place. Little Wolf sustained a gash to his leg during the race but recovered for his final appearance of the season in the Prix Royal-Oak. Little Wolf started the 2/1 favourite for the Group One race over 3100m at Longchamp on 24 October but appeared unsuited by the very soft ground and finished sixth of the thirteen runners behind Denel.

=== 1983: five-year-old season ===
Ardross, who had won the Ascot Gold Cup and been unbeaten over staying distances in 1981 and 1982 was retired to stud at the end of 1982, leaving the major staying races of 1983 looking much more open than they had done for some time. Little Wolf began his season by being dropped down in distance for the John Porter Stakes over one and a half miles at Newbury and finished second to the four-year-old Diamond Shoal to whom he was conceding six pounds. In the Yorkshire Cup he again failed to show his best form on very soft ground and finished sixth behind the filly Line Slinger.

On 16 June, Little Wolf started the 4/1 second favourite for the Gold Cup over two and a half miles on firm ground at Royal Ascot. Ore started the 7/4 favourite after a win in the Henry II Stakes, with other contenders including Line Slinger, Balitou, Khairpour and Indian Prince. Line Slinger set a very strong pace before Indian Prince took over on the turn into the straight. Carson had settled Little Wolf just behind the leaders and moved past Indian Prince to take the lead with two furlongs left to run. Little Wolf drew steadily away from his rivals to win by five lengths from Khairpour, with Indian Prince a length and a half back in third place. The winning time of 4:24.36 was the fastest recorded in the race for 26 years. After the race, Hern admitted that he was uncertain whether the horse would stay the distance. Six weeks after his win at Ascot, Little Wolf, carrying top weight of 133 pounds, started the 4/9 favourite for the Goodwood Cup in which his main rivals appeared to be Santella Man and Karadar, who had finished first and second in the Queen's Vase at Royal Ascot. Carson sent the favourite into the lead three furlongs from the finish and held the late challenge of Karadar to win by half a length, breaking the course record by three seconds. Carson dismounted immediately after the finish, and it quickly became apparent that the horse had sustained an injury to his left foreleg.

Little Wolf remained in training as a six-year-old, with the Gold Cup as his target, but sprained a tendon when finishing third to Harly in the Henry II Stakes and was retired from racing.

== Assessment ==
In 1980, the independent Timeform organisation gave Little Wolf a rating of 88P, the "P" indicating that in their opinion the colt was likely to be capable of much better form than he had shown. The prediction proved correct as the colt was rated 117 by Timeform in 1981, although this was twenty-three pounds below the top-rated Shergar. Little Wolf improved his Timeform rating to 124 in 1982, but did not appear in the official International Classification. Little Wolf achieved a peak annual Timeform rating of 127 in 1983 and was named the organisation's Best Stayer of the year. In the International Classification, he was rated nine pounds below the top-rated older male Diamond Shoal. In the Gilbey Racing Awards, based on points awarded in major races, Little Wolf was named the Champion Stayer of 1983. In their book A Century of Champions, based on a modified version of the Timeform system, John Randall and Tony Morris rated Little Wolf as an "average" winner of the Gold Cup.

== Stud career ==
Little Wolf was retired from racing to stand as a breeding stallion at Burley Lodge Stud in Berkshire at a fee of £1,500. He had very little impact as a sire of winners, with the most successful of his offspring being Miltonfield, a gelding who won nine races including the Irish Cesarewitch in 1999. His last recorded foals were born in 1994.

== Pedigree ==
Pedigree of Little Wolf (GB), chestnut stallion, 1978
Sire Grundy (GB) 1972	Great Nephew (GB); 1963	Honeyway	Fairway
Sire Grundy (GB) 1972	Great Nephew (GB); 1963	Honeyway	Honey Buzzard
Sire Grundy (GB) 1972	Great Nephew (GB); 1963	Sybil's Niece	Admiral's Walk
Sire Grundy (GB) 1972	Great Nephew (GB); 1963	Sybil's Niece	Sybil's Sister
Sire Grundy (GB) 1972	Word from Lundy (GB); 1966	Worden	Wild Risk
Sire Grundy (GB) 1972	Word from Lundy (GB); 1966	Worden	Sans Tares
Sire Grundy (GB) 1972	Word from Lundy (GB); 1966	Lundy Princess	Princely Gift
Sire Grundy (GB) 1972	Word from Lundy (GB); 1966	Lundy Princess	Lundy Parrot
Dam Hiding Place (GB) 1963	Doutelle (GB); 1954	Prince Chevalier	Prince Rose
Dam Hiding Place (GB) 1963	Doutelle (GB); 1954	Prince Chevalier	Chevalerie
Dam Hiding Place (GB) 1963	Doutelle (GB); 1954	Above Board	Straight Deal
Dam Hiding Place (GB) 1963	Doutelle (GB); 1954	Above Board	Feola
Dam Hiding Place (GB) 1963	Jojo (GB); 1950	Vilmorin	Gold Bridge
Dam Hiding Place (GB) 1963	Jojo (GB); 1950	Vilmorin	Queen of the Meadows
Dam Hiding Place (GB) 1963	Jojo (GB); 1950	Fairy Jane	Fair Trial
Dam Hiding Place (GB) 1963	Jojo (GB); 1950	Fairy Jane	Light Tackle (Family: 19-c)
