= Shergar Cup =

Annual horse racing event in England

The Shergar Cup is an annual horse racing event held at Ascot Racecourse, in Ascot, about 25 miles west of London, usually during early August. The race is named in honour of Shergar, the horse that won the 1981 Derby and was killed in an IRA kidnap, and was originally sponsored by Shergar's owner, the Aga Khan. The event is currently sponsored by Dubai Duty Free.

The event was first held in 1999 at Goodwood Racecourse, but has been held at Ascot since 2000 (except in 2005, when Ascot was closed so the grandstand could be redeveloped). Unusually, for a horse racing event, it is a team competition, with jockeys invited to join the teams (two teams from 1999 to 2004; four teams from 2006) divided by their presenting countries or region, or their gender, and the winning team determined by their overall performance across six races. The winning team is presented with a silver trophy of Shergar, donated by the Aga Khan. Described as "racing's most popular event", it attracts around 30,000 spectators each year, and is recognized for attracting families and other new spectators beyond the usual race-going demographic.

== History ==
The event was championed by the British Horseracing Board chairman Peter Savill, with the aim of creating a competition similar to the Ryder Cup in golf.

The inaugural competition was held at Goodwood in May 1999, between two teams of horses with owners from Europe (led by Robert Sangster) against owners from the Middle East (led by Sheikh Mohammed bin Rashid Al Maktoum and his family, including 12 horses from the Godolphin Racing stable).

The competition moved to Ascot in 2000, and the Middle East team became a "Rest of the World" (ROW) team. The event was blighted by a dearth of runners; some European-owned horses were transferred to the ROW team to balance the numbers, but only one race had a full field of ten runners, and two set off with fields of only five or six runners. The low turnout was attributed to the races being unclassified.

From 2001 to 2004, the membership of the teams was based the origin of the jockeys rather the ownership of the horses, with two teams of six jockeys each: one team of jockeys from Great Britain and Ireland (GB&I), and one from ROW. It was suggested in 2002 that team racing tactics used by GB&I captain Kieren Fallon contravened the Rules of Racing (he ran a two-mile race hard to tire the opposition, and then let his teammate Pat Eddery through to win). The controversy led to a Stewards' enquiry; Fallon's explanation that he took up the pace in a slow race was accepted, but there were complaints from Hughie Morrison who trained Fallon's ride, and later clarificatory changes to the Rules. Fallon was quoted as commenting laconically: "They told me it was an individual team thing. I know I am from the west of Ireland but someone is going to have to explain that to me."

Ascot Racecourse was closed in 2005 for renovations, and the format was changed again when the competition resumed in 2006, with the number of teams increased from two (or six jockeys each) to four (of three jockeys each), representing: Great Britain, Ireland, Europe, and ROW.

Since 2012 thru 2024, the Great Britain and Ireland teams have been merged, so that three of the teams represent geographical areas – GB&I, Europe, and ROW – and the fourth team is an all-women "Girls'" team of female jockeys from around the world. The jockeys in each team wears silks dominated by distinctive colours: green for GB&I, blue for Europe, yellow for ROW, pink for the Girls. Since 2025, the Asia team, wearing red silks, replaces the all-ladies.

The event now fills a weekend between Glorious Goodwood in late July, and the Ebor Festival in late August. There are activities between races to keep both adults and children entertained, which may include a fairground rides, extreme sports demonstrations, and musical performances. At the end of the day, a concert is held for race-goers. Concert performers in 2015 included Blue, Lulu, Rick Astley and Razorlight.

During COVID-19 pandemic, 2020 edition were not held, replaced by normal raceday. In 2021, jockeys are mostly based in the United Kingdom and Europe team are removed.

== Competition format ==
In its current format, the competition has six flat races of differing lengths and classifications, all run as handicap races:

- Dash (5 furlongs, for 3-year-olds or older, Class 2)
- Stayers (2 miles, for 4-year-olds or older, Class 2)
- Challenge (1 mile 4 furlongs, for 4-year-olds or older, Class 3)
- Mile (1 mile, for 4-year-olds or older, Class 2)
- Classic (1 mile 4 furlongs, for 3-year-olds, Class 3)
- Sprint (6 furlongs, for 3-year-olds, Class 2)

Each jockey rides in five races, and each team has either two or three members riding any given race, which is balanced out over the six races so all teams have an equal number of races for the day. The team with the highest points is the winner, with points for the first five places: 15, 10, 7, 5, and 3. If a horse does not run and cannot be replaced with a reserve animal, the jockey who is unable to ride is awarded 4 points for the race in question. At the end of the day, in addition to the Shergar Cup trophy, the Alistair Haggis Silver Saddle award and a £3,000 cash award is given to the individual jockey with the most points. There is also a "ride of the day" award given for the most outstanding performance in a single race.

Fields are limited to 10 horses and two reserves. Horses to run are declared an hour before the race, and if there is a withdrawal, a reserve has 15 minutes to be brought up. Horses must be entered by the Monday prior to the race, and on the Thursday prior, entries are made final. The top 10 horses by their BHA ratings are scheduled to run, with entrants in 11th and 12th place selected as reserves, who are also expected to be at the racecourse and ready to run. The entries in each race are then ranked 1 through 10 by the official handicapper. A complex formula is then applied to give each of the four teams a balanced mix of high and low-rated horses, and to ensure all jockeys on each team similarly have a balanced mix of horses across all five rides. Once this is set, then a random draw is held to assign jockeys to the proper group of horses.

The incentives for owners to provide horses include free entry fees for the horses and a £30,000 purse for each race, with £369 for last place, so all entrants get a portion of the prize money, essentially guaranteeing that any owner will make back enough money to cover their expenses. ITV Racing covers some races, and the owners of horses in those races earn a "saddle cloth" £50 to the owner of every runner in ITV-televised races. All are run as handicap races. All horses entered as reserves but not able to run a race are given a £500 travel allowance. In addition, owners and trainers have free food and drink all day. Horse grooms also have free food all day and also have a chance to win money. Awards of £200 each are given to the groom of each winning horse and to the groom of the best turned-out horse in each race. Grooms of the horses placing 2nd through 5th in each race earn £100.

== Past winners ==
Year	Winning team	Points	Captain	Silver Saddle winner	Points
2000	Europe	157	Pat Eddery	Michael Kinane (GB&IRE)	45
2001	Rest of the World	125	Frankie Dettori	David Flores (ROW)	45
2002	Great Britain and Ireland	137	Kieren Fallon	Richard Hughes (GB&IRE)	45
2003	Rest of the World	146	Frankie Dettori	Kieren Fallon (GB&IRE)	43
2004	Rest of the World	138	Frankie Dettori	Weichong Marwing (ROW)	37
	not held in 2005
2006	Great Britain and Ireland	153	Jamie Spencer	Ryan Moore (GB&IRE)	50
2007	Rest of the World	87	Hugh Bowman	Hugh Bowman (ROW)	36
2008	Europe	94	Gérald Mossé	Gérald Mossé (EUR)	50
2009	Ireland	101	Richard Hughes	Richard Hughes (IRE)	49
2010	Ireland	80	Richard Hughes	Fran Berry (IRE)	35
2011	Ireland	80	Richard Hughes	Paul Hanagan (GB)	35
2012	Rest of the World	89	Yutaka Take	Matthew Chadwick (ROW)	45
2013	Europe	97	Gérald Mossé	Gérald Mossé (EUR)	46
2014	Europe	69	Frankie Dettori	Olivier Peslier (EUR)	42
2015	Girls	69	Emma-Jayne Wilson	Sammy Jo Bell (GIRLS)	42
2016	Rest of the World	68	Silvestre de Sousa	Thierry Jarnet (EUR)	38
2017	Great Britain and Ireland	86	Jamie Spencer	Fran Berry (GB&IRE)	37
2018	Girls	76	Josephine Gordon	Hayley Turner (GIRLS)	39
2019	Rest Of The World	86	Yuga Kawada	Hayley Turner (GIRLS)	40
	not held in 2020
2021	Girls	69	Hayley Turner	Nicola Currie (GIRLS)	47
2022	Great Britain and Ireland	132	Jamie Spencer	Neil Callan (GB&IRE)	50
2023	Girls	78	Hayley Turner	Hollie Doyle (GIRLS)	48
2024	Girls	71	Hayley Turner	Hayley Turner (GIRLS)	35
2025	Asia	68	Suraj Narredu	Hugh Bowman (ROW)	32
2026	Great Britain and Ireland	81	Saffie Osborne	Ryan Moore (GB&IRE)	47
