= Bireme (horse) =

British-bred Thoroughbred racehorse

- Racing silks of Dick Hollingsworth
- Sire: Grundy
- Grandsire: Great Nephew
- Dam: Ripeck
- Damsire: Ribot
- Sex: Mare
- Foaled: 2 May 1977
- Country: United Kingdom
- Colour: Chestnut
- Breeder: Dick Hollingsworth
- Owner: Dick Hollingsworth
- Trainer: Dick Hern
- Record: 4:3-0-1

Major wins
- Musidora Stakes (1980); Oaks Stakes (1980)

Awards
- Timeform rating 127

Bireme (2 May 1977 – 10 January 2002) was a British Thoroughbred racehorse and broodmare best known for winning the classic Epsom Oaks in 1980. After winning one of her two starts in 1979, she won the Musidora Stakes on her three-year-old debut before winning the Oaks in record time. Later that summer she broke loose during a training session and sustained career-ending injuries. She was retired to stud with a record of three wins in four races and has had some influence as a broodmare.

== Background ==
Bireme was a chestnut mare with a white blaze bred by her owner Richard Dunbavin "Dick" Hollingsworth at his Arches Hall Stud in Hertfordshire. She was one of the first crop of foals sired by Grundy, an outstanding racehorse who won The Derby and the King George VI and Queen Elizabeth Stakes in 1975. Grundy went on to sire several other good winners, but his stock tended to be slow-maturing stayers and he was sold and exported to Japan in 1983.

Bireme's dam Ripeck was a highly successful broodmare whose other offspring included the Queen Alexandra Stakes winner Balinger and the Coronation Cup winner Buoy. Ripeck was a granddaughter of the Hollingsworth family's influential broodmare Felucca, whose other descendants included Cut Above (St Leger Stakes), Sharp Edge (Irish 2,000 Guineas), Longboat (Ascot Gold Cup), Bolas (Irish Oaks), Dash for Cash (Australian Guineas) and Daffodil (AJC Oaks).

The filly was sent into training with Dick Hern at West Ilsley in Berkshire, and was ridden by the Scottish jockey Willie Carson.

== Racing career ==
=== 1979: two-year-old season ===
Bireme did run as a two-year-old, when she won a thirty-runner maiden race over seven furlongs at Newmarket Racecourse in October. She was then matched against colts in the Houghton Stakes over the same course and distance later that month and finished third behind Night Alert and Posse. The first and second both developed into top class milers in 1980: Night Alert won the Prix Jean Prat while Posse won the St James's Palace Stakes and the Sussex Stakes.

=== 1980: three-year-old season ===
On her first appearance as a three-year-old, Bireme was moved up in class and distance for the Group Three Musidora Stakes over 10 1/2 furlongs at York Racecourse in May. Ridden by Carson, she started at odds of 4/1 and won from the Lingfield Oaks Trial winner Gift Wrapped and the 1000 Guineas runner-up Our Home.

On 7 June, Bireme was again moved up in distance to contest the 202nd running of the Oaks Stakes over 1 1/2 miles at Epsom Downs Racecourse. She started at odds of 9/2 in a field of eleven fillies which included the 1000 Guineas winner Quick As Lightning who was made 3/1 favourite. Willie Carson had the choice of three Hern-trained runners and selected Bireme ahead of the partially sighted May Hill Stakes winner The Dancer and the Cheshire Oaks winner Shoot a Line. Carson settled Bireme in second place behind The Dancer, before moving into the lead two furlongs from the finish and winning by two lengths from Vielle, with The Dancer in third and Quick as Lightning fourth. The win gave Hern and Carson a classic double, having won the Derby with Henbit three days earlier. After the race Carson said: "She gave me a super ride. I was never in any doubt with her, she is a lovely filly with a long stride who just keeps finding it for me." Her winning time of 2:34.33 broke the race record which had stood since 1927.

Dick Hern intended to aim the filly at the St Leger Stakes in September, but her training was disrupted by tendon trouble. While still recuperating, and undergoing gentle exercise on the Berkshire Downs, she sustained a career-ending injury. Recalling the incident, Hern explained that after throwing her rider, Bireme "took off with her tail in the air and went for home as hard as she could leg it, right across the West Ilsley-East Ilsley road before she crashed in the lane. She cut and bruised herself so badly that she never ran again." Her stablemate Shoot a Line went on to be unbeaten after her Oaks defeat winning the Ribblesdale Stakes, Irish Oaks, Yorkshire Oaks and Park Hill Stakes.

== Assessment and honours ==
In 1980, Bireme was given a rating of 127 by the independent Timeform organisation, four pounds below the top-rated three-year-old filly Detroit, the winner of the Prix de l'Arc de Triomphe. In their book, A Century of Champions, based on the Timeform rating system, John Randall and Tony Morris rated Bireme an "average" winner of the Oaks.

Dick Hern called her "a very, very good filly who never reached her potential because of injury ... nobody knows quite how good she could have been."

== Stud record ==
Bireme was retired from racing to become a broodmare at her owners stud. She produced at least six winners, the best of whom was the filly Yawl, who won at Listed and Group Three level. Yawl's daughter Prowess produced the 2013 Oaks winner Talent.

Bireme's winning progeny included:

- Trireme (chestnut colt foaled in 1987, sired by Rainbow Quest), won two races
- Quadrireme (bay colt 1989, sired by Rousillon), won four races
- Yawl (brown filly 1990, sired by Rainbow Quest), won Oh So Sharp Stakes and Rockfel Stakes. Female-line ancestor of Talent and Dreamloper.
- Admiral Rous (bay colt 1991, sired by Rousillon), won one race
- Yacht (chestnut colt 1990, sired by Warning), won two races
- Flagship (GB) : chesnut filly, foaled 18 February 1994, by Rainbow Quest (USA), won one race and placed once from 5 starts in England 1996–97

Bireme was euthanised at Arches Hall on 10 January 2002 because of "the infirmities of old age". She was twenty-five years old.

== Pedigree ==
Pedigree of Bireme (GB), chestnut mare, 1977
Sire Grundy (GB) 1972	Great Nephew (GB); 1963	Honeyway	Fairway
Sire Grundy (GB) 1972	Great Nephew (GB); 1963	Honeyway	Honey Buzzard
Sire Grundy (GB) 1972	Great Nephew (GB); 1963	Sybil's Niece	Admiral's Walk
Sire Grundy (GB) 1972	Great Nephew (GB); 1963	Sybil's Niece	Sybil's Sister
Sire Grundy (GB) 1972	Word from Lundy (GB); 1966	Worden	Wild Risk
Sire Grundy (GB) 1972	Word from Lundy (GB); 1966	Worden	Sans Tares
Sire Grundy (GB) 1972	Word from Lundy (GB); 1966	Lundy Princess	Princely Gift
Sire Grundy (GB) 1972	Word from Lundy (GB); 1966	Lundy Princess	Lundy Parrot
Dam Ripeck (GB) 1959	Ribot (GB); 1952	Tenerani	Bellini
Dam Ripeck (GB) 1959	Ribot (GB); 1952	Tenerani	Tofanella
Dam Ripeck (GB) 1959	Ribot (GB); 1952	Romanella	El Greco
Dam Ripeck (GB) 1959	Ribot (GB); 1952	Romanella	Barbara Burrini
Dam Ripeck (GB) 1959	Kyak (GB); 1953	Big Game	Bahram
Dam Ripeck (GB) 1959	Kyak (GB); 1953	Big Game	Myrobella
Dam Ripeck (GB) 1959	Kyak (GB); 1953	Felucca	Nearco
Dam Ripeck (GB) 1959	Kyak (GB); 1953	Felucca	Felsetta (Family: 11-d)
