= Sally Brown (horse) =

British-bred Thoroughbred racehorse

- Sire: Posse
- Grandsire: Forli
- Dam: Unsuspected
- Damsire: Above Suspicion
- Sex: Mare
- Foaled: 14 March 1982
- Country: United Kingdom
- Colour: Chestnut
- Breeder: Robert Cowell
- Owner: Robert Cowell
- Trainer: Michael Stoute
- Record: 6: 3-1-0

Major wins
- Ribblesdale Stakes (1985); Yorkshire Oaks (1985)

Awards
- Timeform rating 120 (1985)

Sally Brown (1982 – 2000) was a British Thoroughbred racehorse and broodmare. She was owned and bred by Robert Cowell and trained by Michael Stoute. She did not race as a juvenile but emerged as a top-class middle-distance performer in 1985, winning three of her six races including the Ribblesdale Stakes and the Yorkshire Oaks. She was retired at the end of the season and had modest success as a broodmare.

== Background ==
Sally Brown was a "lengthy, angular" chestnut mare with a narrow white blaze and bred by her owner Robert Cowell at his Chevington Stud in Newmarket, Suffolk. She was one of the best horses sired by Posse, a Kentucky-bred stallion who won the St. James's Palace Stakes and Sussex Stakes in 1980. Posse's other progeny included the Coronation Cup winner Sheriff's Star. Sally Brown's dam Unsuspected was a successful racemare who won eight races between 1974 and 1976. As a broodmare she produced several other winners including Shoot Clear (Waterford Candelabra Stakes), Untold and Mohican Girl (Gala Stakes). She lived until the exceptionally advanced age (for a Thoroughbred) of 36, dying in June 2008.

The filly was sent into training with Michael Stoute at the Beech Hurst stable in Newmarket and was ridden in her major races by Walter Swinburn.

== Racing career ==
=== 1985: three-year-old season ===
Unraced as a two-year-old, Sally Brown made her debut in a maiden race over ten furlongs at Sandown Park Racecourse in April and finished second to Northern Aspen (later to win the Prix d'Astarte and the Gamely Stakes). In May the filly was moved up in distance for a maiden at Haydock Park and recorded her first success as she won by three lengths from the colt Sharp Noble.

Sally Brown was then stepped up in class for the Group Two Ribbesdale Stakes and started the 7/1 fifth choice in the betting behind Little Deep Water, Grace Note (runner-up in the Lingfield Oaks Trial), Goody Blake (runner-up in the Lupe Stakes) and Silver Dollar. Ridden by Swinburn she tracked the leader Little Deep Water before taking the lead a furlong out. She drew away from her opponents in the closing stages to win by two and a half lengths from Graecia Magna with a gap of four lengths back to Goody Blake in third place. The filly was sent to Ireland and moved up to Group One level for the Irish Oaks at the Curragh Racecourse on 13 July and started second favourite behind Dubian, a filly who had finished third behind Oh So Sharp and Triptych in The Oaks. In a slowly-run race, she was outpaced in the closing stages and finished fourth behind Helen Street, Alydar's Best (winner of the 1984 Grand Critérium) and Dubian, beaten four lengths by the winner.

Sally Brown faced Helen Street and Alydar's Best again when she was one of seven fillies to contest the Yorkshire Oaks at York Racecourse on 20 August. The other runners included Kiliniski (winner of the Lingfield Oaks Trial and fourth in the Epsom Oaks), Helenetta (Cheshire Oaks), Cold Line and Petradia. Helen Street started the 8/11 favourite ahead of Alydar's Best and Kiliniski with Sally Brown fourth choice at odds of 6/1. Sally Brown raced in third place behind the outsiders Cold Line and Helenetta before taking the lead early in the straight. She was strongly challenged in the final furlong but stayed on strongly to win by three quarters of a length and a head from Kiliniski and Helen Street. In September Sally Brown was sent to France to run in the Prix Vermeille over 2400 metres at Longchamp Racecourse. After looking likely to be involved in the finish on the final turn, she faded badly in the straight and finished unplaced behind Walensee.

== Assessment ==
In 1985, the independent Timeform organisation gave Sally Brown a rating of 120, placing her 11 pounds inferior to their top-rated three-year-old filly Oh So Sharp. In the official International Classification she was rated on 79, making her the fifth-best three-year-old filly in Europe over 11 furlongs+.

== Breeding record ==
Sally Brown was retired from racing to become a broodmare for her owner's stud. Between 1988 and 1998 she produced at least eight foals and three winners:

- Desert Queen, a bay filly, foaled in 1988, sired by Green Desert. Unraced.
- Anne Bonny, bay filly, 1989, by Ajdal. Won two races.
- Scorpius, bay colt, 1990, by Soviet Star. Won one race.
- Polina, bay filly, 1991, by Polish Precedent. Finished second in only race.
- Sveltana, bay filly, 1992, by Soviet Star. Won one race.
- Rigoletto, chestnut colt (later gelded), 1995, by Machiavellian. Failed to win in eight races.
- Solo Banco, bay colt, 1997, by Unfuwain. Unraced.
- La Samba, bay filly, 1998, by Sadler's Wells. Unraced.

Sally Brown died in 2000.

== Pedigree ==
Pedigree of Sally Brown (GB), chestnut mare, 1982
Sire Posse (USA) 1977	Forli (ARG); 1963	Aristophanes	Hyperion
Sire Posse (USA) 1977	Forli (ARG); 1963	Aristophanes	Commotion
Sire Posse (USA) 1977	Forli (ARG); 1963	Trevisa	Advocate
Sire Posse (USA) 1977	Forli (ARG); 1963	Trevisa	Veneta
Sire Posse (USA) 1977	In Hot Pursuit (USA); 1971	Bold Ruler	Nasrullah
Sire Posse (USA) 1977	In Hot Pursuit (USA); 1971	Bold Ruler	Miss Disco
Sire Posse (USA) 1977	In Hot Pursuit (USA); 1971	Lady Be Good	Better Self
Sire Posse (USA) 1977	In Hot Pursuit (USA); 1971	Lady Be Good	Past Eight
Dam Unsuspected (GB) 1972	Above Suspicion (GB); 1956	Court Martial	Fair Trial
Dam Unsuspected (GB) 1972	Above Suspicion (GB); 1956	Court Martial	Instantaneous
Dam Unsuspected (GB) 1972	Above Suspicion (GB); 1956	Above Board	Straight Deal
Dam Unsuspected (GB) 1972	Above Suspicion (GB); 1956	Above Board	Feola
Dam Unsuspected (GB) 1972	Chevanstell (GB); 1964	Le Levanstell	Le Lavandou
Dam Unsuspected (GB) 1972	Chevanstell (GB); 1964	Le Levanstell	Stella's Sister
Dam Unsuspected (GB) 1972	Chevanstell (GB); 1964	Chevarctic	Arctic Star
Dam Unsuspected (GB) 1972	Chevanstell (GB); 1964	Chevarctic	Chevalier's Star (Family: 5-h)
