= 1981 Epsom Derby =

202nd annual running of the Derby horse race

- Derby
- Location: Epsom Downs Racecourse
- Date: 3 June 1981
- Winning horse: Shergar
- Starting price: 10/11 Fav
- Jockey: Walter Swinburn
- Trainer: Michael Stoute
- Owner: Aga Khan IV
- Conditions: Dead

Epsom Derby 1981
1-2-3
Shergar	Glint of Gold	Scintillating Air

Also Ran
4-5-6
Shotgun	Church Parade	Sheer Grit
7-8-9
Silver Season	Riberetto	Sunley Builds
10-11-12
Kings General	Sass	Krug
13-14-15
Kalaglow	Robellino	Golden Brigadier
16-17-18
Kind of Hush	Al Nasr	Waverley Hall
19
Lydian	19 Ran	2m 44.21s

The 1981 Epsom Derby was the 202nd annual running of the Derby horse race. It took place at Epsom Downs Racecourse on 3 June 1981.

The race was won by the Aga Khan's Shergar, at odds of 10/11 ridden by the nineteen-year-old jockey Walter Swinburn and trained at Newmarket, Suffolk by Michael Stoute. The winning margin of ten lengths was the largest in the history of the race. However, the winning time of 2:44.21 was the slowest since 1946.

== Race details ==
- Sponsor: none
- Winner's prize money: £149,900
- Going: Dead
- Number of runners: 18
- Winner's time: 2 minutes, 44.21 seconds

== Full result ==
	Dist *	Horse	Jockey	Trainer	SP
1		Shergar	Walter Swinburn	Michael Stoute	10–11
2	10	Glint of Gold	John Matthias	Ian Balding	13-1
3	2	Scintillating Air	Geoff Baxter	Bruce Hobbs	50-1
4	2	Shotgun	Lester Piggott	Chris Thornton	7-1
5	4	Church Parade	Willie Carson	Dick Hern	25-1
6	1½	Sheer Grit	Joe Mercer	Clive Brittain	28-1
7	1	Silver Season	Ernie Johnson	Clive Brittain	100-1
8	hd	Riberetto	Pat Eddery	Ron Boss	22-1
9	4	Sunley Builds	Philip Waldron	Gavin Hunter	200-1
10	3	Kings General	Brian Taylor	Guy Harwood	150-1
11	shd	Sass	John Reid	Paul Kelleway	500-1
12	4	Krug	Bruce Raymond	Stan Mellor	66-1
13	3	Kalaglow	Greville Starkey	Guy Harwood	11-1
14	2	Robellino	Paul Cook	Ian Balding	28-1
15	6	Golden Brigadier	Paul Bradwell	Clive Brittain	150-1
16	½	Kind of Hush	Steve Cauthen	Barry Hills	25-1
17	20	Al Nasr	Alfred Gibert	André Fabre (FR)	16-1
18	¾	Waverley Hall	Bryn Crossley	Rod Simpson	1000-1
DNS	^{1}	Lydian	Freddy Head	Criquette Head

^{1} Lydian was scratched at the start after refusing to enter the stalls.

== Winner details ==
Further details of the winner, Shergar:

- Foaled: 3 March 1978, in Ireland
- Sire: Great Nephew; Dam: Sharmeen (Val de Loir)
- Owner: Aga Khan IV
- Breeder: Aga Khan IV

== Form analysis ==
=== Two-year-old races ===
Notable runs by the future Derby participants as two-year-olds in 1980:

- Church Parade – 1st in Lanson Champagne Stakes, 3rd in Champagne Stakes
- Glint of Gold – 1st in Gran Criterium
- Kalaglow – 1st in Horris Hill Stakes
- Robellino – 2nd in Chesham Stakes, 1st in Seaton Delaval Stakes, 1st in Royal Lodge Stakes
- Sheer Grit – 3rd in William Hill Futurity
- Shergar – 2nd in William Hill Futurity

=== The road to Epsom ===
Early-season appearances in 1981 and trial races prior to running in the Derby:

- Al Nasr – 1st in Prix La Force
- Glint of Gold – 1st in Derby Italiano
- Kind of Hush – 1st in Craven Stakes
- Kings General – 3rd in Sandown Classic Trial
- Riberetto – 1st in Lingfield Derby Trial
- Robellino – 2nd in Blue Riband Trial Stakes
- Scintillating Air – 3rd in Dante Stakes
- Sheer Grit – 2nd in Lingfield Derby Trial
- Shergar – 1st in Sandown Classic Trial, 1st in Chester Vase
- Shotgun – 2nd in Dante Stakes
- Sunley Builds – 2nd in Chester Vase

=== Subsequent Group 1 wins ===
Group 1 / Grade I victories after running in the Derby.

- Al Nasr – Prix d'Ispahan (1982)
- Glint of Gold – Grand Prix de Paris (1981), Preis von Europa (1981), Grand Prix de Saint-Cloud (1982), Grosser Preis von Baden (1982)
- Kalaglow – Eclipse Stakes (1982), King George VI and Queen Elizabeth Stakes (1982)
- Shergar – Irish Derby (1981), King George VI and Queen Elizabeth Stakes (1981)

== Subsequent breeding careers ==
Leading progeny of participants in the 1981 Epsom Derby.

=== Stallions of Classic winners ===
Robellino (14th)

- Mister Baileys – 1st 2000 Guineas Stakes (1996)
- Classic Park – 1st Irish 1,000 Guineas (1997) Dam of Epsom Derby runner up and leading National Hunt sire Walk In The Park
- Robertico – 1st Deutsches Derby (1998)
- Royal Rebel – 1st Ascot Gold Cup (2001),(2002)

Shergar (1st)

- Authaal – 1st Irish St Leger (1986)
- Maysoon – 2nd 1000 Guineas Stakes (1986), 3rd Epsom Oaks (1986)
- Shibil – 3rd Derby Italiano (1986)
- Sherkraine – 2nd Phoenix Stakes (1985)

Al Nasr (17th)

- Zaizoom – 1st Derby Italiano (1987)
- Acteur Francais - 2nd Poule d'Essai des Poulains (1991)
- Nasr El Arab – 1st Charles H. Strub Stakes (1989), 1st San Juan Capistrano Handicap (1989)
- Prince Of Andros – 1st Tattersalls Gold Cup (1995)

=== Stallions of Group/Grade One winners ===
Kalaglow (13th)

- Jeune – Australian Champion Racehorse of the Year (1994–1995)
- Sternkönig – 3rd Deutsches Derby (1993), 1st Deutschland-Preis (1994) Sire of 2000 Derby Italiano winner Kallisto
- Timarida – 1st Beverly D. Stakes (1996), 1st Bayerisches Zuchtrennen (1996), 1st Irish Champion Stakes (1996)
- Shining Water – 1st Solario Stakes (1986) Dam of Tenby, Bude and Bright And Clear

Glint of Gold (2nd)

- Heart of Darkness – 1st National Stakes (1990)
- Warfield – 3rd Prix du Cadran (1991)
- Spinning – 3rd Man o' War Stakes (1992)
- Vagog – 1st Long Walk Hurdle (1992)
- Ikdam – 1st Triumph Hurdle (1989)

=== Stallions of National Hunt horses ===
Sheer Grit (6th)

- Clay County – 1st Northumberland Gold Cup Novices' Chase (1991)
- Unsinkable Boxer – 1st Sefton Novices' Hurdle (1998)

Riberetto (8th)

- Jocks Cross – 1st Welsh National (2000)
- Tarrs Bridge – 1st Bristol Novices' Hurdle (1996)

Sunley Builds (9th)

- Sunley Bay – 1st Mandarin Handicap Chase (1996)

=== Other stallions ===
Kind Of Hush (16th) – Itsabrahma (2nd Prix de la Forêt 1991), Osario (3rd Prix de la Forêt 1991)
Silver Season (7th) – Great grandsire of 2007 Lancashire Oaks winner Turbo Linn
Church Parade (5th) – Exported to New Zealand, produced 1988 New Zealand 2000 Guineas runner up Testament
Scintillating Air (3rd) – Exported to India
