= Tolmi =

Thoroughbred racehorse

- Sire: Great Nephew
- Grandsire: Honeyway
- Dam: Stilvi
- Damsire: Derring-Do
- Sex: Mare
- Foaled: 23 March 1978
- Country: United Kingdom
- Colour: Bay
- Breeder: George Cambanis
- Owner: George Cambanis
- Trainer: Bruce Hobbs
- Record: 8: 3-4-0

Major wins
- Princess Margaret Stakes (1980); Coronation Stakes (1981)

Awards
- Top-rated European two-year-old filly (1980); Timeform rating 122 (1980), 120 (1981)

Tolmi (foaled 23 March 1978) was a British Thoroughbred racehorse and broodmare. She won both her races in 1980, including the Princess Margaret Stakes before her season was curtailed by illness and injury, and was rated the equal-best two-year-old filly in Europe. In the following year she was narrowly beaten in the Classic 1000 Guineas before winning the Coronation Stakes at Royal Ascot. After finishing second in her three remaining races she was retired to stud, where her record as a dam of winners was disappointing.

== Background ==
Tolmi was a "strong, compact" dark-coated bay filly with a very small white star and a white sock on her left hind leg, bred in England by her owner George Cambanis. Her dam Stilvi was bought by Cambanis as a yearling and became a top-class racehorse, winning the King George Stakes and Duke of York Stakes and an outstanding broodmare. Before Tolmi, she had produced Tachypous (Middle Park Stakes), Tromos (Dewhurst Stakes) and Tyrnavos (Irish Derby). She was sired by Great Nephew, a British stallion whose other progeny included Grundy and Shergar. The filly was sent into training with Bruce Hobbs at his Palace House stable in Newmarket, Suffolk and was ridden in all but her final race by Edward Hide.

== Racing career ==
=== 1980: two-year-old season ===
Tolmi began her racing career in the Princess Maiden Stakes over six furlongs at Newmarket Racecourse in July. According to Timeform's annual Racehorses of 1980, she "outclassed" her nineteen opponents, winning easily by four lengths from Exclusively Raised, a filly who went on to win the May Hill Stakes. Later that month he started 4/5 favourite for the Group Three Princess Margaret Stakes over six furlongs at Ascot Racecourse. Her bridle broke on the way to the start and had to be repaired, delaying the race and causing the filly to become unsettled. She started slowly but took the lead a furlong from the finish and won by one and a half lengths and six lengths from Kittyhawk and Her Grace. Tolmi's next race was scheduled to be the Lowther Stakes at York Racecourse in August but she was withdrawn from the race after being found to have a "low blood count". In her absence, Kittyhawk won the race impressively. Tolmi was being prepared for a run against the season's other outstanding two-year-old filly Marwell in the Cheveley Park Stakes when her season was ended by a cannon bone injury in early September. At the end of the year she was the ante-post favourite for the following year's 1000 Guineas.

=== 1981: three-year-old season ===
Tolmi made her three-year-old debut in the 1000 Guineas at Newmarket on 30 April. Her preparation had been disrupted by a muscle injury and she arrived at Newmarket looking less than fully fit. Starting the 11/2 third favourite she tracked the leaders and appeared to be travelling strongly entering the final furlong. In a "thrilling finish" she finished second, beaten a neck by Fairy Footsteps, just ahead of Go Leasing, Marwell and Madam Gay. She was then dropped in class for a race at Kempton Park Racecourse, but appeared to struggle on the prevailing soft ground and finished fourth of the six runners behind Nasseem. In June, Tolmi faced Nasseem on firm ground in the Coronation Stakes, which was then a Group Two race, at Royal Ascot and started at odds of 4/1. She was always well-placed, and after being switched to the outside in the straight to obtain a clear run she accelerated into the lead and won by half a length from the Irish filly Happy Bride, with Nasseem in third place.

In the Child Stakes at Newmarket in July, Tolmi was beaten three lengths when attempting to concede six pounds to Robert Sangster's filly Star Pastures. Later in the month was beaten a length when conceding three pounds to the same filly in the Royal Wedding Stakes at Goodwood Racecourse. Tolmi and Star Pastures met yet again, this time at level weights, in the Heathorns Stakes at Goodwood in September, with Star Pastures emerging the winner by two lengths. There was some speculation that the filly would contest the Queen Elizabeth II Stakes, but she never raced again and was retired to stud.

== Assessment ==
In 1980, the independent Timeform organisation gave Tolmi a rating of 122, making her the second highest-rated two-year-old filly of the season behind Marwell. In the official International Classification she was rated equal to Marwell as the best two-year-old filly in Europe, six pounds behind the leading colt Storm Bird. In the following year she was rated ten pounds below Marwell (the top-rated three-year-old filly) in the International Classification and was rated 120 by Timeform.

== Stud record ==
Tolmi was retired from racing to become a broodmare. Following the death of Cambanis in 1981, she was owned by the Stilvi Compania Financiera. Her record at stud was disappointing: she produced several minor winners, but nothing of top class.

Tolmi's recorded foals:

- Sariza (bay filly, foaled in 1983, sired by Posse), unraced
- Messaria (bay filly, 1985, by Ile de Bourbon), failed to win in five races
- Zorkos (chestnut colt, 1986, by Niniski), failed to win in three races
- Lassia (bay filly, 1987, by Teenoso), third in only race
- Nile Delta (bay colt, 1989, by Green Desert), won one race
- Barratry (chestnut colt, 1990, by Caerleon), failed to win in eight races
- Double Dagger (bay colt, 1991, by Reference Point), won two races
- Unreal City (bay colt, 1993, by Rock City), won one race
- Get the Point (bay colt, 1994, by Sadler's Wells), won eight races
- Mary Boone (filly, 1999, by Dr Devious), failed to win in two races

== Breeding ==
Pedigree of Tolmi (GB), bay mare, 1978
Sire Great Nephew (GB) 1963	Honeyway (GB); 1941	Fairway	Phalaris
Sire Great Nephew (GB) 1963	Honeyway (GB); 1941	Fairway	Scapa Flow
Sire Great Nephew (GB) 1963	Honeyway (GB); 1941	Honey Buzzard	Papyrus
Sire Great Nephew (GB) 1963	Honeyway (GB); 1941	Honey Buzzard	Lady Peregrine
Sire Great Nephew (GB) 1963	Sybil's Niece (GB); 1951	Admiral's Walk	Hyperion
Sire Great Nephew (GB) 1963	Sybil's Niece (GB); 1951	Admiral's Walk	Tabaris
Sire Great Nephew (GB) 1963	Sybil's Niece (GB); 1951	Sybil's Sister	Nearco
Sire Great Nephew (GB) 1963	Sybil's Niece (GB); 1951	Sybil's Sister	Sister Sarah
Dam Stilvi (IRE) 1969	Derring-Do (GB); 1961	Darius	Dante
Dam Stilvi (IRE) 1969	Derring-Do (GB); 1961	Darius	Yasna
Dam Stilvi (IRE) 1969	Derring-Do (GB); 1961	Sipsey Bridge	Abernant
Dam Stilvi (IRE) 1969	Derring-Do (GB); 1961	Sipsey Bridge	Claudette
Dam Stilvi (IRE) 1969	Djerella (FR); 1960	Guersant	Bubbles
Dam Stilvi (IRE) 1969	Djerella (FR); 1960	Guersant	Montagnana
Dam Stilvi (IRE) 1969	Djerella (FR); 1960	Djeretta	Djebel
Dam Stilvi (IRE) 1969	Djerella (FR); 1960	Djeretta	Candida (Family 3-h)
