= Authaal =

American-bred Thoroughbred racehorse

- Sire: Shergar
- Grandsire: Great Nephew
- Dam: Galletto
- Damsire: Nijinsky
- Sex: Stallion
- Foaled: 17 May 1983
- Country: United States
- Colour: Bay
- Breeder: Swettenham Stud
- Owner: Sheikh Mohammed
- Trainer: David O'Brien; Colin Hayes
- Record: 12: 6-0-2

Major wins
- Irish St. Leger (1987); Queen Elizabeth Stakes (ATC) (1988); Underwood Stakes (1988)

Awards
- Timeform rating 118? (1986); Top-rated European 3-y-o 14f+ (1986)

Authaal (17 May 1983 – after 1999) was an American-bred Thoroughbred racehorse and sire. He was probably the best horse sired by the ill-fated Shergar, winning at the highest level in both Ireland and Australia. He was unraced as a two-year-old but won four of his five races as a three-year-old in 1986, culminating in an emphatic victory in the Irish St. Leger. After failing to reproduce his best form in 1987, he was set to race in Australia where he recorded major wins in the Queen Elizabeth Stakes and Underwood Stakes. After his retirement from racing he stood as a breeding stallion in Japan but had little success as a sire of winners.

== Background ==
Authaal was a bay stallion with a broad white blaze and three white socks bred in Kentucky by the Swettenham Stud. He came from the first and only crop of foals sired by Shergar who won The Derby, Irish Derby and the King George VI and Queen Elizabeth Stakes in 1981. Shergar was kidnapped from his owner's stud farm in 1983 and never seen again: it is generally believed that he was killed by his captors who were members of the Provisional IRA. Authaal's dam Galletto was a successful racemare who won the Galtres Stakes in 1977 and was a daughter of the Irish Oaks winner Gaia.

Authaal was the only one of his sire's first crop to be put up for auction as a foal in 1983 and was sold for 325,000 guineas. A year later at the Goffs sale, he broke the European record for a yearling when he was bought for 3.1 million guineas by the bloodstock agent Tote Cherry-Downes on behalf of Sheikh Mohammed. The colt was sent into training with David O'Brien.

== Racing career ==
=== 1986: three-year-old season ===
Authaal did not race as a two-year-old and did not appear as a three-year-old in 1986 until July, when he won a maiden race over one and a half miles at Leopardstown Racecourse. He followed up despite being dropped in distance in early August when he won a minor race over nine furlongs at Phoenix Park Racecourse. Later that month, he was stepped up in class and sent to England for the Group Two Great Voltigeur Stakes at York Racecourse. Ridden by Christy Roche, he led for most of the way but was outpaced in the closing stages and finished last of the seven runners behind the Paul Cole-trained Nisnas. He returned to Ireland for a minor race over one and a half miles at Naas Racecourse in September and won by four lengths from Bank Step.

Christy Roche was again in the saddle when Authaal contested the Irish St. Leger over one and three quarter miles at the Curragh on 12 October. The 1985 winner Leading Counsel started 6/4 joint-favourite alongside the British-trained filly I Want To Be (winner of the Meld Stakes), with the French mare Faburola (Prix Kergorlay) next in the betting and Authaal the 8/1 fourth choice. The other two runners went off at odds of 50/1. With the other six jockeys apparently intent on restraining their mounts, Roche sent Authaal into the lead and opened up a lead of fifteen lengths. Although his pursuers steadily reduced his margin of superiority in the straight, the colt never looked in any danger of defeat and won by five lengths from Faburola.

In the official International Classification for 1986, Authaal was given a rating of 125, making him the top-rated three-year-old in Europe over 14 furlongs and beyond. The Independent Timeform organisation gave him a rating of 118?, with the "?" indicating that the rating was based on "inadequate or unsatisfactory data". In their annual Racehorses of 1986 Timeform explained that they could not be sure of the extent to which the wide margin of Authaal's win in the Irish St. Leger was the result of Roche's bold tactics.

=== 1987: four-year-old season ===
On his first appearance as a four-year-old, Authaal finished unplaced over ten furlongs and was then sent to Royal Ascot to contest the Ascot Gold Cup over two and a half miles on 18 June. He went off at odds of 9/1 and finished tailed-off last of the eight runners behind Paean.

=== 1988: five-year-old season ===
In 1988, Authaal was sent to race in Australia where he was trained by Colin Hayes. He finished third to Ostensible in the Neville Sellwood Stakes in March and then contested the Group 1 Queen Elizabeth Stakes over 1800 metres at Randwick Racecourse on 4 April. Ridden by Darren Beadman he started at odds of 3.25/1 and won from Ostensible.

After the winter break, Authaal returned in the Underwood Stakes at Caulfield Racecourse in which he was partnered by Brent Thomson. He won his second Australian Group 1 as he came home three lengths clear of Fair Sir. In October, he finished fourth to Sky Chase in the Caulfield Stakes and third under top weight in the Caulfield Cup.

== Stud career ==
In 1989, Authaal was retired from racing and sent to Japan to become a breeding stallion. He spent ten seasons at stud in Japan but attracted little interest from breeders after 1995 and covered his last mares in 1999. The best of his offspring was the Grade III winner Ibuki Rajo Mon.

== Pedigree ==
Pedigree of Authaal (USA), bay stallion, 1983
Sire Shergar (IRE) 1978	Great Nephew (GB); 1963	Honeyway	Fairway
Sire Shergar (IRE) 1978	Great Nephew (GB); 1963	Honeyway	Honey Buzzard
Sire Shergar (IRE) 1978	Great Nephew (GB); 1963	Sybil's Niece	Admiral's Walk
Sire Shergar (IRE) 1978	Great Nephew (GB); 1963	Sybil's Niece	Sybil's Sister
Sire Shergar (IRE) 1978	Sharmeen (FR); 1972	Val de Loir	Vieux Manoir
Sire Shergar (IRE) 1978	Sharmeen (FR); 1972	Val de Loir	Vali
Sire Shergar (IRE) 1978	Sharmeen (FR); 1972	Nasreen	Charlottesville
Sire Shergar (IRE) 1978	Sharmeen (FR); 1972	Nasreen	Ginetta
Dam Galletto (IRE) 1974	Nijinsky (CAN); 1967	Northern Dancer	Nearctic
Dam Galletto (IRE) 1974	Nijinsky (CAN); 1967	Northern Dancer	Natalma
Dam Galletto (IRE) 1974	Nijinsky (CAN); 1967	Flaming Page	Bull Page
Dam Galletto (IRE) 1974	Nijinsky (CAN); 1967	Flaming Page	Flaring Top
Dam Galletto (IRE) 1974	Gaia (GB); 1966	Charlottesville	Prince Chevalier
Dam Galletto (IRE) 1974	Gaia (GB); 1966	Charlottesville	Noorani
Dam Galletto (IRE) 1974	Gaia (GB); 1966	Ghana	Botticelli
Dam Galletto (IRE) 1974	Gaia (GB); 1966	Ghana	Grolldochnicht (Family: 1-a)

- Authaal was inbred 3 × 4 to Charlottesville, meaning that this stallion appears in both the third and fourth generations of his pedigree.
