= Untold (horse) =

British-bred Thoroughbred racehorse

- Sire: Final Straw
- Grandsire: Thatch
- Dam: Unsuspected
- Damsire: Above Suspicion
- Sex: Mare
- Foaled: 23 March 1983
- Country: United Kingdom
- Colour: Chestnut
- Breeder: Robert Cowell
- Owner: Robert Cowell; Sheikh Mohammed
- Trainer: Michael Stoute
- Record: 9: 4-1-2

Major wins
- Fillies' Mile (1985); Yorkshire Oaks (1986)

Awards
- Timeform rating 112p (1985), 124 (1986)

Untold (23 March 1983 – 2005) was a British Thoroughbred racehorse and broodmare. As a two-year-old she showed very promising form, winning two of her three races including the Fillies' Mile. In the following year she was campaigned exclusively at Group One level and emerged as a top-class middle-distance performer and stayer. She finished second in The Oaks and third in the Irish Oaks before recording her biggest success in the Yorkshire Oaks. She finished third when matched against male opposition and made favourite for the St Leger before ending her career by finishing sixth in the Champion Stakes. She had little success as a dam of winners.

== Background ==
Untold was a "robust, well-made, quite attractive" chestnut mare with a large white star and four white socks bred by her owner Robert Cowell at his Chevington Stud in Newmarket, Suffolk. She was one of the most successful horses sired by Final Straw whose wins included the Champagne Stakes, July Stakes and Greenham Stakes. Untold's dam Unsuspected was a successful racemare who won eight races between 1974 and 1976. As a broodmare she produced several other winners including Shoot Clear (Waterford Candelabra Stakes), Sally Brown (Yorkshire Oaks) and Mohican Girl (Gala Stakes). She lived until the exceptionally advanced age (for a Thoroughbred) of 36, dying in June 2008.

The filly was sent into training with Michael Stoute at the Beech Hurst stable in Newmarket.

== Racing career ==
=== 1985: two-year-old season ===
After finishing unplaced on her racecourse debut Untold won a seven furlong maiden race at Yarmouth Racecourse in August. Later that month she was assigned top weight of 133 pounds in a nursery handicap over one mile at Sandown Park Racecourse. She struggled to obtain a clear run in the straight but finished strongly to win by a head from the colt Hills Bid. Untold was then moved up in class and started 6/4 favourite for the Fillies' Mile at Ascot Racecourse in September in which she was ridden by Walter Swinburn. Her main rivals appeared to be Tender Loving Care and Moonlight Lady (second and third in the May Hill Stakes) and the Waterford Candelabra Stakes runner-up Meteoric. After taking the lead early in the straight she got the better of a sustained struggle with Moonlight Lady to win by half a length, with the pair finishing three lengths clear of Sue Grundy in third place.

=== 1986: three-year-old season ===
Untold sustained a minor training setback in the spring of 1986 and did not appear on the track until 7 June when she was one of fifteen fillies to contest the 208th running of the Oaks Stakes at Epsom Downs Racecourse. She started a 20/1 outsider in a fifteen-runner field headed by the 1000 Guineas winner Midway Lady. Swinburn opted to ride the Stoute stable's more fancied runner Maysoon (winner of the Fred Darling Stakes and runner-up in the 1000 Guineas) leaving Paul Eddery to take the ride on Untold whilst Brian Rouse rode the stable's other runner Colorspin. Untold took the lead early in the straight and maintained her advantage until the final furlong when she was overtaken and beaten a length into second place by Midway Lady, with Maysoon and Colorspin in third and fourth. Following the race the filly was bought privately by Sheikh Mohammed. Untold was then sent to Ireland for the Irish Oaks at the Curragh on 12 July and started 8/11 favourite against seven opponents. Swinburn chose to ride her in preference to Colorspin, but again made the wrong decision, as Untold appeared unsuited by the soft ground and finished a distant third behind her stablemate and the Irish filly Fleur Royale.

On 19 August Untold was one of eleven fillies to contest the Yorkshire Oaks on good to firm ground at York Racecourse. Once again, Swinburn had to make a choice between the Stoute stable's runners and decided to partner Colorspin, whilst Greville Starkey took the ride on Untold. Colorspin started favourite ahead of Gull Nook (Ribblesdale Stakes and Park Express (Lancashire Oaks, Nassau Stakes) with Untold next in the betting on 5/1. The other contenders included Fleur Royale, Queen Helen (later to win the St Simon Stakes), Gesedeh Pretty Polly Stakes), Ivor's Image (Oaks d'Italia) and Rejuvenate (Musidora Stakes). After chasing the leaders, Untold wore down the leader Park Express in the last quarter mile to win by three quarters of a length with Ivor's Image taking third ahead of Colorspin.

The St Leger Stakes at Doncaster Racecourse on 13 September saw Untold, ridden by Swinburn, take on seven colts in the final Classic of the British season. She was made the 5/2 favourite ahead of the Gordon Stakes winner Allez Milord and King George V Stakes winner Moon Madness. She briefly struggled to obtain a clear run in the straight and despite making some progress in the closing stages she never looked likely to win, finishing third behind Moon Madness and Celestial Storm. In October she was brought back in distance for the Champion Stakes over ten furlongs at Newmarket but failed to show her best form on rain-softened ground and finished sixth of the eleven runners behind Triptych.

== Assessment ==
In 1985 the independent Timeform organisation gave Untold a rating of 112 p (the "p" indicating that she was expected to make more than usual improvement) twelve pounds behind their best juvenile filly Femme Elite. In the official International Classification she was rated ten pounds inferior to the top-rated two-year-old filly Baiser Vole. In their annual Racehorses of 1985, Timeform stated that she "would certainly be on our short list for the Oaks".

In the International Classification for 1986 she was rated the third best filly in Europe over 11 furlongs+ behind Darara and Midway Lady. Timeform rated her on 124, five pounds behind their best three-year-old fillies Darara and Sonic Lady. In Racehorses of 1986 they described her as "thoroughly genuine".

== Breeding record ==
Untold was retired from racing to become a broodmare for Sheikh Mohammed's Darley Stud. None of her foals won major races and many never made it to the racecourse. Untold died in 2005. Her known foals include:

- Unfold, a chestnut filly, foaled in 1988, sired by Kris. Unraced.
- Crystal City, chestnut filly, 1990, by Kris. Won one race in four starts as a three-year-old.
- Sunningwell, bay filly, 1991, by Sadler's Wells. Unraced.
- Muffle, bay filly, 1992, by Sadler's Wells. Unplaced in one start as a three-year-old.
- Understood, bay colt, 1993, by Green Desert. Unraced.
- Marazi, chestnut gelding, 1994, by Arazi. Won eight races out of 33 starts.
- Towaahi, chestnut filly, 1995, by Caerleon. Unraced.
- Daiwa Spunky, chestnut colt, 1997, by Arazi. Placed once in 20 starts in Japan.
- Morissett, bay filly, 1998, by Danehill. Failed to win in eight races.
- Welltold, bay filly, 1999, by Danehill. Failed to win in four races.
- Castlegrogan, chestnut colt 2000, by Spectrum. Failed to win in two races.
- Unassuming, bay filly, 2003, by Orpen. Won one race.
- Krismick, bay filly, 2004, by Orpen. Failed to win in three races.
- Unnamed, bay colt, 2005, by Orpen. Unraced, most likely died young.

== Pedigree ==
Pedigree of Untold (GB), chestnut mare, 1983
Sire Final Straw (IRE) 1977	Thatch (USA); 1970	Forli	Aristophanes
Sire Final Straw (IRE) 1977	Thatch (USA); 1970	Forli	Trevisa
Sire Final Straw (IRE) 1977	Thatch (USA); 1970	Thong	Nantallah
Sire Final Straw (IRE) 1977	Thatch (USA); 1970	Thong	Rough Shod
Sire Final Straw (IRE) 1977	Last Call (GB); 1964	Klairon	Clarion
Sire Final Straw (IRE) 1977	Last Call (GB); 1964	Klairon	Kalmia
Sire Final Straw (IRE) 1977	Last Call (GB); 1964	Stage Fright	Big Game
Sire Final Straw (IRE) 1977	Last Call (GB); 1964	Stage Fright	Bashful
Dam Unsuspected (GB) 1972	Above Suspicion (GB); 1956	Court Martial	Fair Trial
Dam Unsuspected (GB) 1972	Above Suspicion (GB); 1956	Court Martial	Instantaneous
Dam Unsuspected (GB) 1972	Above Suspicion (GB); 1956	Above Board	Straight Deal
Dam Unsuspected (GB) 1972	Above Suspicion (GB); 1956	Above Board	Feola
Dam Unsuspected (GB) 1972	Chevanstell (GB); 1964	Le Levanstell	Le Lavandou
Dam Unsuspected (GB) 1972	Chevanstell (GB); 1964	Le Levanstell	Stella's Sister
Dam Unsuspected (GB) 1972	Chevanstell (GB); 1964	Chevarctic	Arctic Star
Dam Unsuspected (GB) 1972	Chevanstell (GB); 1964	Chevarctic	Chevalier's Star (Family: 5-h)
