= Hadji Nikoli =

Hadji Nikoli (Николи Минчоолу)
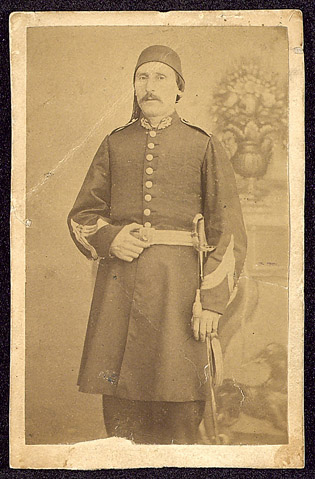
- Born: Nikoli Minchoolu; 1826; Tarnovo, Ottoman Empire (now Bulgaria)
- Died: 1892 (aged 65–66); Tarnovo, Ottoman Empire (now Bulgaria)
- Occupations: Industrialist, grantor, participant in the Bulgarian Independent Orthodox Church Fight

Hadji Nikoli (1826-1892), was a famous merchant, Bulgarian patriot, participant in the Bulgarian Independent Orthodox Church Fight.

== Biography ==
Hadji Nikoli was born in 1826 in Tarnovo, Bulgaria. His father Hadji Dimo was a fur and leather merchant. Young Nikoli received education of high quality. One of his teachers Evtim – a priest – was a Bulgarian patriot who hated the Greek men of God who ruled the Church of Bulgaria.

== Bulgarian Independent Orthodox Church independence ==
Hadji Nikoli became a patriot too who dedicated his life to the Bulgarian Orthodox Church independence. He left Tarnovo and settled down in Constantinople (today Istanbul). He kept active correspondence with representatives from all towns in Bulgaria and protected the rights of the Bulgarian Orthodox population. He expressed the requests to the Turkish Sultan. The fight was long and difficult, over 40 years. Many representatives resisted because of lack of finance. Hadji Nikoli and d-r Stojan Chomakov from Plovdiv was the only persons who fight till the end.

== Hadji Nikoli Inn ==
Hadji Nikoli Inn was built during the period of 1858–1862 by the native constructor Nikola Fichev (usta Koljo Ficheto) for the rich merchant Hadji Nikola Minchev (Hadji Nikoli). Today the Inn is the only one survived in Veliko Tarnovo among 70 built in the town.

== Sources ==
- Енциклопедия България, том 4 / 1984 г., с. 273
- Бележити търновци, С.1985 г., с. 125/126
- Евтимова Вера, Ханът на Хаджи Николи, 2007
- Пътеводител на гр. Велико Търново и околността му, В.Т. 1907 г., с. 79
- Русев Сава, "Търново през погледа на дедите ни"
- Радев Иван, "История на Велико Търново XVIII - XIX век", "Слово", В.Т., 2000, стр.482-486
- "Биографията на х. Николи Д. Минчев от гр. В. Търново", С. 1907 г.
- Колева Елена, Колева Ивелина, "Връзките на хаджи Николи Минчооглу от Търново с чорбаджи Иванчо Пенчов Калпазанов от Габрово в борбата за черковна независимост, и поп Иван Гъбенски чорбаджи", в-к "Християни" (към "100 вести"), 07.07.2011г., стр. 1-2 - част І и бр. от 14.07.2011 г., стр. 2 -ІІ част
