= Sheriff's Star =

British-bred Thoroughbred racehorse

- Breed: Thoroughbred
- Sire: Posse
- Grandsire: Forli
- Dam: Castle Moon
- Damsire: Kalamoun
- Sex: Stallion
- Foaled: 27 April 1985
- Country: United Kingdom
- Colour: Grey
- Breeder: Lavina, Duchess of Norfolk
- Owner: Lavina, Duchess of Norfolk
- Trainer: Lady Herries
- Record: 13:6-2-2

Major wins
- King Edward VII Stakes (1988); Great Voltigeur Stakes (1988); Coronation Cup (1989); Grand Prix de Saint-Cloud (1989)

Sheriff's Star (27 April 1985 – after 1995) was a British Thoroughbred racehorse and sire. As a two-year-old he won his first two races before establishing himself as one of the best British colts of his generation with a close second in the William Hill Futurity. In the following year he won the King Edward VII Stakes and Great Voltigeur Stakes, but was well-beaten in both the Derby and the St Leger. He reached his peak as a four-year-old in 1989 when he recorded Group One successes in both the Coronation Cup and Grand Prix de Saint-Cloud. He later stood as a breeding stallion in Japan where he had some success as a sire of winners.

== Background ==
Sheriff's Star was a "tall, leggy, sparely-made" grey horse bred by his owner Lavina, Duchess of Norfolk. He was probably the best European horse sired by Posse, a Kentucky-bred stallion who won the St James's Palace Stakes and Sussex Stakes in 1980. Sheriff's Star's dam, Castle Moon, produced seven other winners including the St Leger Stakes winner Moon Madness. Castle Moon was a half-sister of the Ascot Gold Cup winner Ragstone and, as a descendant of the mare Herringbone was closely related to many good winners including Kings Lake, Michelozzo and Celtic Swing. The Duchess sent her colt into training with her daughter Lady Herries at Angmering Park in West Sussex. He was ridden in most of his races by Tony Ives.

== Racing career ==
=== 1987: two-year-old season ===
Sheriff's Star made his racecourse debut in a 27-runner maiden race over seven furlongs at Newmarket Racecourse in August. Starting a 33/1 outsider, he took the lead inside the final furlong and won convincingly by two and a half lengths from Topsider Man. At Ascot Racecourse in September, he started favourite for the Mornington Stakes after reports that he had been performing exceptionally well in training gallops. He took the lead in the final quarter mile and won by three-quarters of a length from Ancient Flame. The colt was then moved up sharply in class for the Group One William Hill Futurity over one mile at Doncaster Racecourse on 24 October. Ridden by Tony Clark, he started poorly and fought his jockey's attempts to restrain him in the early stages but finished strongly and failed by only a head to overhaul the Dick Hern-trained Emmson.

=== 1988: three-year-old season ===
Sheriff's Star made his debut as a three-year-old in the Predominate Stakes (a recognised trial race for The Derby) over ten furlongs at Goodwood Racecourse. He was restrained towards the back of the seven-runner field before making steady progress in the straight to finish second, beaten one and a half lengths by Minster Son. On 1 June, the colt started at odds of 18/1 in a field of fourteen runners for the 209th running of the Derby and finished sixth behind Kahyasi. Two weeks later, Sheriff's Star was sent to Royal Ascot to contest the King Edward VII Stakes and started the 9/2 third favourite. He turned into the straight in fifth place before producing a sustained run, taking the lead inside the final furlong and winning by three-quarters of a length from the Luca Cumani-trained Polar Gap. In the Great Voltigeur Stakes at York Racecourse on 17 August, Sheriff's Star was matched against Insan, a colt who had been beaten a short head by Kahyasi in the Irish Derby. After tracking Insan for most of the race, Sheriff's Star stayed on strongly in the straight to take the lead inside the final furlong and win by three-quarters of a length. On his final appearance of the season, the colt started the 7/2 second favourite for the St Leger Stakes over fourteen and a half furlongs at Doncaster. After appearing to have a good chance early in the straight, he weakened in the closing stages to finish third behind Minster Son and Diminuendo.

=== 1989: four-year-old season ===
On his first appearance as a four-year-old, Sheriff's Star finished fourth behind Unfuwain in the Jockey Club Stakes at Newmarket in May, seven lengths behind the winner. Ray Cochrane took over the ride when the colt contested the Group One Coronation Cup over one and a half miles at Epsom on 8 June. He started the 11/4 favourite ahead of the Derby runner-up Glacial Storm, the Yorkshire Cup winner Mountain Kingdom and the Rogers Gold Cup winner Ile de Chypre. He was sixth of the nine runners entering the straight before making headway in the straight and taking the lead in the final furlong to win by half a length from Ile de Chypre with Green Adventure two and a half lengths away in third. Sheriff's Star was then sent overseas for the first time to contest the Grand Prix de Saint Cloud at Saint-Cloud Racecourse on 2 July. He started at odds of 4.8/1 against five opponents including Star Lift (Prix Royal Oak), Golden Pheasant and Boyatino (third in the 1988 Prix de l'Arc de Triomphe). Ives settled the horse in fourth before making his challenge in the straight. In a closely contested finish he prevailed by a head and a short head from Golden Pheasant and Boyatino, with little more than two lengths covering all six finishers. Three weeks later Sheriff's Star started 10/1 third favourite for the thirty-ninth running of Britain's most prestigious all-aged race, the King George VI and Queen Elizabeth Stakes at Ascot. He never looked likely to win and finished fourth of the seven runners behind Nashwan, Cacoethes and Top Class. On his final racecourse appearance, Sheriff's Star was sent to Germany where he finished third behind Ibn Bey and Mondrian in the Europa Preis on 24 September.

== Assessment ==
In 1987, the independent Timeform organisation gave Sheriff's Star a rating of 122, five pounds below their top-rated two-year-old Warning. In the official International Classification he was rated eight pounds below the joint topweights Warning and Ravinella.

== Stud record ==
In October 1989, Sheriff's Star was sold to Masayuki Nishiyama and was retired to stud in Japan. His stud career appears to have been brief, with his last recorded foals being born in 1996. The best of his offspring was Seiun Sky, a colt who won the Satsuki Shō and the Kikuka Shō in 1998.

== Sire line tree ==
- Sheriff's Star
  - Seiun Sky
    - Mayol

== Pedigree ==
Pedigree of Sheriff's Star (GB), grey stallion, 1985
Sire Posse (USA) 1977	Forli (ARG); 1963	Aristophanes	Hyperion*
Sire Posse (USA) 1977	Forli (ARG); 1963	Aristophanes	Commotion
Sire Posse (USA) 1977	Forli (ARG); 1963	Trevisa	Advocate
Sire Posse (USA) 1977	Forli (ARG); 1963	Trevisa	Veneta
Sire Posse (USA) 1977	In Hot Pursuit (USA); 1971	Bold Ruler	Nasrullah*
Sire Posse (USA) 1977	In Hot Pursuit (USA); 1971	Bold Ruler	Miss Disco
Sire Posse (USA) 1977	In Hot Pursuit (USA); 1971	Lady Be Good	Better Self
Sire Posse (USA) 1977	In Hot Pursuit (USA); 1971	Lady Be Good	Past Eight
Dam Castle Moon (GB) 1975	Kalamoun (GB); 1970	Zeddaan	Grey Sovereign*
Dam Castle Moon (GB) 1975	Kalamoun (GB); 1970	Zeddaan	Vareta
Dam Castle Moon (GB) 1975	Kalamoun (GB); 1970	Kharunissa	Prince Bio
Dam Castle Moon (GB) 1975	Kalamoun (GB); 1970	Kharunissa	Palariva
Dam Castle Moon (GB) 1975	Fotheringay (FR); 1964	Right Royal	Owen Tudor*
Dam Castle Moon (GB) 1975	Fotheringay (FR); 1964	Right Royal	Bastia
Dam Castle Moon (GB) 1975	Fotheringay (FR); 1964	La Fresnes	Court Martial
Dam Castle Moon (GB) 1975	Fotheringay (FR); 1964	La Fresnes	Pin Stripe* (Family:8-c)

* Sheriff's Star is inbred 4S x 5D x 5D to the stallion Hyperion, meaning that he appears fourth generation once on the sire side of his pedigree, and fifth generation twice (via Owen Tudor and Pinstripe) on the dam side of his pedigree.

* Sheriff's Star is inbred 4S x 5D to the stallion Nasrullah, meaning that he appears fourth generation on the sire side of his pedigree, and fifth generation (via Grey Sovereign) on the dam side of his pedigree.
