= Posse (horse) =

American-bred Thoroughbred racehorse (1977–1991

- Sire: Forli
- Grandsire: Aristophanes
- Dam: In Hot Pursuit
- Damsire: Bold Ruler
- Sex: Stallion
- Foaled: 15 May 1977
- Country: United States
- Colour: Chestnut
- Breeder: Ogden Mills Phipps
- Owner: Ogden Mills Phipps
- Trainer: John Dunlop
- Record: 6: 2-2-1

Major wins
- St James's Palace Stakes (1980); Sussex Stakes (1980)

Awards
- Timeform rating: 108p(1979), 130 (1980)
- Last updated on 12 March 2025

Posse (15 May 1977 – At least after January 1991) was an American-bred, British-trained Thoroughbred racehorse and sire. He ran only six times, winning twice, in a racing career which lasted from October 1979 until July 1980. As a three-year-old he was promoted to second after a controversial race for the 2000 Guineas and established himself as one of the leading milers in Europe with wins in the St James's Palace Stakes and Sussex Stakes. He was retired to stud at the end of the year and had some success as a sire of winners.

== Background ==
Posse was a chestnut horse with a white star, bred in Kentucky by his owner Ogden Mills Phipps. His sire Forli was a champion in his native Argentina before becoming a successful breeding stallion in the United States. His best-known offspring was Forego, the three-time American Horse of the Year, but he was also successful in Europe with horses such as Thatch. His dam, In Hot Pursuit, bred and raced by Phipps, was a leading two-year-old in the United States in 1973 when her wins included the Fashion Stakes. She produced several other winners including Posse's Grade Three winning full-brothers Late As Usual (Swoon's Son Stakes) and Hot Rodder (Oettingen-Rennen). Phipps sent the colt to race in England where he was trained by John Dunlop at Arundel, West Sussex.

== Racing career ==
=== 1979: two-year-old season ===
Posse made his only appearance as a two-year-old in October 1979 when he contested the Houghton Stakes over seven furlongs at Newmarket Racecourse. Starting at odds of 14/1 he produced a strong late run but showed his inexperience ("ran very green") in the final furlong and finished second, beaten two and a half lengths by the Irish-trained Night Alert with the future Epsom Oaks winner Bireme three lengths back in third.

=== 1980: three-year-old season ===
On his three-year-old debut, Posse was sent to Newbury Racecourse in England for the Greenham Stakes, an important trial race for the 2000 Guineas. In a strong field for a Group Three event he finished strongly to take third, beaten a neck and half a length by Final Straw and 1979's leading juvenile Monteverdi. The Middle Park Stakes winner Known Fact finished fourth with the William Hill Futurity winner Hello Gorgeous in fifth. On 3 May Posse started at odds of 12/1 for the 2000 Guineas over Newmarket's Rowley Mile with the undefeated French colt Nureyev the 13/8 favourite. Eddery tracked the leaders on Posse and appeared to have a good chance 2.5 furlongs from the finish when he was hampered and almost fell when Philippe Paquet on Nureyev barged his way through the centre of the field to make his challenge. Posse recovered well and made up a great deal of ground in the final furlong to finish third, beaten a neck and three-quarters of a length by Nureyev and Known Fact. An inquiry by the racecourse stewards ruled that Paquet had been guilty of "reckless" riding and, under the rules of racing at the time, had no option but to disqualify the favourite and relegate him to last place. The race was awarded to Known Fact, with Posse being promoted to second. Two weeks later, Posse started 7/2 second favourite behind Monteverdi for the Irish 2,000 Guineas at the Curragh, despite having performed poorly in a training gallop. He appeared the likely winner two furlongs from the finish but eventually finished fourth behind Nikoli, Last Fandango and Final Straw, beaten less than a length. While some observers felt that Posse had failed through lack of courage, Timeform suggested that the colt had not recovered sufficiently from his exertions at Newmarket.

Posse reappeared in the St James's Palace Stakes at Royal Ascot in June. Shortly before the race a half-share in the colt was sold for $1 million to the Derisley Wood Stud, despite the fact that he was still a maiden after four races. At Ascot he was again opposed by Last Fandango and Final Straw, but the lightly raced Dalsaan was made the odds-on favourite, with Posse starting the 11/2 third choice in the betting. Eddery rode the colt with great confidence, restraining him towards the back of the field and he was still only in fifth place with a furlong and a half to run. Posse then moved up on the outside, and produced what Timeform described as a "dazzling turn of speed" to overtake Final Straw well inside the final furlong and win very easily by one and a half lengths. In the Sussex Stakes at Goodwood Racecourse in July, Posse was matched against older horses for the first time, but Final Straw appeared to be his most serious opponent and he was made the 8/13 favourite. Eddery again held the colt up for a late challenge but in the straight he appeared unlikely to obtain a clear run as he was trapped on the inside. In the closing stages Posse was switched to the outside and again produced a striking burst of acceleration to catch Final Straw in the last stride and win by a head. There was considerable anticipation of a race between Posse and either Known Fact or Kris the leading miler of 1979, both of whom had missed the summer with training problems. Shortly after his win at Goodwood however, Posse contracted a respiratory infection from which he failed to recover sufficiently for him to take part in the major autumn races. He did not run again and was retired to the Derisley Wood Stud.

== Assessment ==
In 1979, the independent Timeform organisation gave Posse a rating of 108 p, the "p" indicating that he was likely to make more than the normal improvement between two and three years of age. The prediction proved true as Posse was rated 130 by Timeform in 1980, seven pounds below their top-rated horse Moorestyle. In the official International Classification he was rated the fifth-best three-year-old colt in Europe behind Moorestyle, Argument, Known Fact and Nureyev, and the ninth-best horse of any age.

== Stud record ==
Posse began his stud career in England where he was based for six years before being exported to Japan. Despite the fact that he had been known as a miler, Posse's offspring tended to thrive over longer distances. The best of his progeny was probably Sheriff's Star, who won the Coronation Cup and the Grand Prix de Saint-Cloud as a four-year-old in 1989, as well as siring Seiun Sky in Japan, who won the Satsuki Sho and Kikuka-Sho in 1998. Other good winners included Sally Brown, Altayan (Prix Maurice de Nieuil) and Linpac West (John Porter Stakes). Through his daughter Batave, Posse was the damsire of the leading miler Bigstone. Posse was "put out of stud" in Japan on 11 January 1991.

== Sire line tree ==
- Posse
  - Altayan
  - Sheriff's Star
    - Seiun Sky
      - Mayol
  - Linpac West

== Pedigree ==
Pedigree of Posse (USA), chestnut stallion, 1977
Sire Forli (ARG) 1963	Aristophanes (GB); 1948	Hyperion	Gainsborough
Sire Forli (ARG) 1963	Aristophanes (GB); 1948	Hyperion	Selene
Sire Forli (ARG) 1963	Aristophanes (GB); 1948	Commotion	Mieuxce
Sire Forli (ARG) 1963	Aristophanes (GB); 1948	Commotion	Riot
Sire Forli (ARG) 1963	Trevisa (ARG); 1951	Advocate	Fair Trial
Sire Forli (ARG) 1963	Trevisa (ARG); 1951	Advocate	Guiding Star
Sire Forli (ARG) 1963	Trevisa (ARG); 1951	Veneta	Foxglove
Sire Forli (ARG) 1963	Trevisa (ARG); 1951	Veneta	Dogaresa
Dam In Hot Pursuit (USA) 1971	Bold Ruler (USA); 1954	Nasrullah	Nearco
Dam In Hot Pursuit (USA) 1971	Bold Ruler (USA); 1954	Nasrullah	Mumtaz Begum
Dam In Hot Pursuit (USA) 1971	Bold Ruler (USA); 1954	Miss Disco	Discovery
Dam In Hot Pursuit (USA) 1971	Bold Ruler (USA); 1954	Miss Disco	Outdone
Dam In Hot Pursuit (USA) 1971	Lady Be Good (USA); 1956	Better Self	Bimelech
Dam In Hot Pursuit (USA) 1971	Lady Be Good (USA); 1956	Better Self	Bee Mac
Dam In Hot Pursuit (USA) 1971	Lady Be Good (USA); 1956	Past Eight	Eight Thirty
Dam In Hot Pursuit (USA) 1971	Lady Be Good (USA); 1956	Past Eight	Helvetia (Family:8-h)
