= Shergar =

Irish-bred Thoroughbred racehorse (1978–1983)

- Shergar in 1981
- Sire: Great Nephew
- Grandsire: Honeyway
- Dam: Sharmeen
- Damsire: Val de Loir
- Sex: Stallion
- Foaled: 3 March 1978
- Died: c. 8 February to 11 February 1983
- Country: Ireland
- Colour: Bay
- Breeder: HH Aga Khan IV
- Owner: HH Aga Khan IV
- Trainer: Michael Stoute
- Record: 8: 6–1–0

Major wins
- Guardian Classic Trial (1981); Chester Vase (1981); Epsom Derby (1981); Irish Derby (1981); King George VI and Queen Elizabeth Stakes (1981)

Awards
- Timeform rating: 140

Honours
- Shergar Cup on Ascot Racecourse

Shergar (3 March 1978 – c. 8-11 February 1983) was an Irish-bred, British-trained Thoroughbred racehorse. After a very successful season in 1981 he was retired to the Ballymany Stud in County Kildare, Ireland. In 1983 he was stolen from the stud, and a ransom of £2 million was demanded; it was not paid, and negotiations were soon broken off by the thieves. In 1999 a supergrass, formerly in the Provisional Irish Republican Army (IRA), stated they stole the horse. The IRA has never admitted any role in the theft.

The Aga Khan, Shergar's owner, sent the horse for training in Britain in 1979 and 1980. Shergar began his first season of racing in September 1980 and ran two races that year, where he won one and came second in the other. In 1981 he ran in six races, winning five of them. In June that year he won the 202nd Epsom Derby by ten lengths—the longest winning margin in the race's history. Three weeks later he won the Irish Sweeps Derby by four lengths; a month after that he won the King George VI and Queen Elizabeth Stakes by four lengths. In his final race of the year he came in fourth, and the Aga Khan decided to retire him to stud in Ireland.

After Shergar's Epsom Derby win, the Aga Khan sold forty shares in the horse, valuing it at £10 million. Retaining six shares, he created an owners' syndicate with the remaining thirty-four members. Shergar was stolen from the Aga Khan's stud farm by an armed gang on 8 February 1983. Negotiations were conducted with the thieves, but the gang broke off all communication after four days when the syndicate did not accept as true the proof provided that the horse was still alive. In 1999 Sean O'Callaghan, a former member of the IRA, published details of the theft and stated that it was an IRA operation to raise money for arms. He said that very soon after the theft, Shergar had panicked and damaged his leg, which led to him being killed by the gang. An investigation by The Sunday Telegraph concluded that the horse was shot four days after the theft. No arrests have ever been made in relation to the theft. Shergar's body has never been recovered or identified; it is likely that the body was buried near Aughnasheelin, near Ballinamore, County Leitrim.

In honour of Shergar, the Shergar Cup was inaugurated in 1999. His story has been made into two screen dramatisations, several books and two documentaries.

== Background and early training ==
Shergar was a bay colt with a white blaze, four white socks and a wall (blue) eye. A Thoroughbred, he was foaled on 3 March 1978 at Sheshoon—the private stud of the Aga Khan IV—near the Curragh Racecourse in County Kildare, Ireland. Shergar was sired by Great Nephew, a British stallion whose wins included the Prix du Moulin and Prix Dollar in France in 1967. Great Nephew's other progeny included Grundy, Mrs Penny and Tolmi. Shergar's dam was Sharmeen, a seventh-generation descendant of Mumtaz Mahal, a horse that is described by the National Sporting Library as "one of the most important broodmares of the 20th Century".

In 1978 the Aga Khan—the leader of Nizari Ismailism, philanthropist and horse owner—announced he would send some of his yearlings for training in England. For a trainer, he chose Michael Stoute, who was based at Newmarket. Stoute had a good year in 1978, and had trained the winners of the Oaks, Irish Oaks and Yorkshire Oaks with Fair Salinia, and the Gold Cup with Shangamuzo. Shergar was sent into training with Stoute in 1979, as the Aga Khan's second year of sending horses to England.

According to Stoute and Ghislain Drion—the manager of the Aga Khan's Irish studs—Shergar was easy to break and had a good temperament. He responded very well to training, particularly in September 1980, when the jockey Lester Piggott rode him in the run-up to Shergar's debut race.

== Racing career ==
=== 1980: two-year-old season ===
The racing silks of the Aga Khan IV, worn by Lester Piggott and Walter Swinburn when they rode Shergar

On 19 September 1980 Shergar ran his first race, the Kris Plate, with Piggott as his jockey. The race was open to two-year-old colts and geldings over a 1 mile (1.6 km) straight at Newbury. Listed as favourite with odds of 11–8, he kept in behind the leaders before opening up and winning by 2 1/2 lengths. Richard Baerlein, the racing correspondent for The Observer, thought Shergar's run was the best from a two-year-old that season. After the race Stoute said the horse would run one more race that year to gain experience, before resting until the following year.

Shergar's second race was the 1 mile (1.6 km) William Hill Futurity Stakes at Doncaster, run on 25 October 1980. He was again ridden by Piggott, with odds of 5–2 in a very experienced field of seven. Shergar sat behind the pace-setting leader for much of the race; when that horse faded, the running was taken up by Beldale Flutter. Shergar challenged for the lead, but Beldale Flutter pulled away and won by 2 1/2 lengths; Shergar came in second. After the race, Michael Seely, the racing correspondent of The Times, thought Shergar's run was significant, and that he was "a magnificent stamp of a horse", whose odds of 25–1 for the next year's Derby were worth considering.

=== 1981: three-year-old season ===
In late 1980 and early 1981, Shergar filled out; by April he was stronger. Stoute had decided that Shergar should run in that year's Derby, and planned the season accordingly. The first race to prepare him was the Guardian Newspaper Classic Trial, run at Sandown on 25 April 1981, where he was ridden by Walter Swinburn. In a 9-horse, 1 1/4-mile (2.0 km) race, Shergar raised his pace after a mile and won by 10 lengths. Baerlein had written in his column before the race that at 25–1, the odds for Shergar to win the Derby were excellent. After the win, he noted them shortening to 8–1, where, "the bet is still worth pressing"; he continued "If ... [Shergar] wins his next race at Chester or the Ladbroke Lingfield Trial as easily, he will be down to less than 4–1. Surely this is the time to bet like men."

As further training for the Derby, Stoute decided that Shergar needed practice on a left-hand cornered course; he selected Chester, where the Chester Vase was run on 5 May 1981. After keeping pace with the leaders, with half a mile to go, Swinburn urged Shergar to increase speed, and he did, overtaking the leaders and going clear to win by 12 lengths.

Shergar on his way to winning the 1981 Epsom Derby

On 3 June 1981 Shergar ran in the Derby. Set over a 1 1/2 mile (2.4 km) course at the Epsom Downs Racecourse in Surrey, the Derby is a Group 1 flat race open to three-year-old Thoroughbred colts and fillies. After the top of the uphill straight start of the course, Shergar was well-placed and moving through the other runners. At Tattenham Corner—the final bend of the course—Shergar took the front of the race and opened up a lead over the others. Commentating on the race, Peter Bromley informed listeners that "there's only one horse in it—you need a telescope to see the rest!" Swinburn eased off the pace with two furlongs to go, and won by ten lengths. It was the largest winning margin of any Epsom Derby. John Matthias, the jockey of the second-placed horse Glint of Gold, said that "I thought I'd achieved my life's ambition. Only then did I discover there was another horse on the horizon." In the light of Shergar's run of wins, particularly the Derby, Baerlein wrote that the horse was one of the finest he had seen.

While out on the gallops on 15 June, Shergar threw his rider, ran through a hedge onto the road and trotted along to the local village. He was spotted by a local resident, who followed the horse until it stopped to graze on a hedge, and then led him back to the stables. Shergar was unharmed during the event, and Stoute recalled "it's very lucky nothing happened to him; there's a crossing there, and it's a difficult thing".

By the time the Irish Derby was run at the Curragh, on 27 June 1981, Swinburn was suspended following an infringement at Royal Ascot, so Piggott returned to ride Shergar. At the half-way point in the race, Shergar was in third place, but increased his pace to take the lead with three furlongs to go. He slowed during the last furlong, and won by four lengths. As the horse approached the line, Michael O'Hehir, the commentator, informed viewers that "He's winning it so easily; it's Shergar first and the rest are nowhere". After the race Piggott told reporters that he had no doubt that Shergar would win as the horse never struggled in the race. He also said that Shergar was one of the best horses he had ever raced on.

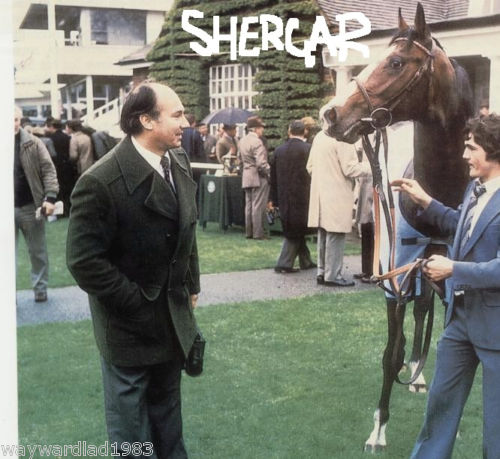
Shergar with his owner, the Aga Khan before 1983

Following Shergar's Epsom Derby win, a group of US horse owners had offered $40 million to syndicate the horse. The Aga Khan turned down the offer, and instead decided to syndicate Shergar for £10 million at £250,000 for each of the forty shares—a record price at the time; the Aga Khan kept six shares for himself and the others were sold individually to buyers from nine countries. The shareholders had the option each year of selecting a mare to be covered—or of selling that option on. The stud fees were £60,000–80,000 per cover, which meant that shareholders could expect to make a profit from stud within four years.

Shergar had a break of almost a month until he ran in the King George VI and Queen Elizabeth Diamond Stakes at Ascot on 25 July 1981. The race was slow-paced to start and Shergar was boxed in by other horses, but found a way out by the time the leaders had reached the final straight, and accelerated to win by four lengths. For Baerlein, the race showed that Shergar was the best horse he had ever seen race; Michael Phillips, the racing correspondent for The Times, wrote that the win "proved that Shergar is a cut above the average but not exceptional". Phillips continued that Shergar "failed to fill me, and many more besides, with the magic that was in the air after Nijinsky and Mill Reef had won the same race".

The Aga Khan and Stoute considered entering Shergar into the Prix de l'Arc de Triomphe that autumn, but decided that he needed one more race to prepare. They entered him into what would be his final race, the St Leger Stakes at Doncaster on 12 September 1981, with Swinburn as the jockey. Ten days before the race, a story was published in the racing newspaper Sporting Life that Shergar had not been practising well and had become "mulish"; Stoute stated that the rumours were untrue. Shergar was running well in the race, although the soft ground was not to his liking, but on the final straight, when Swinburn tried to get him to accelerate to the front, the horse would not respond. Shergar came in fourth, 11 1/2 lengths behind Cut Above, the winner.

Surprised by the manner of the loss, Stoute and the Aga Khan ran a series of tests on Shergar. All showed the horse was in good health, and he worked well in training after the race. Unwilling to risk the horse without knowing what had happened at the St Leger, the Aga Khan did not enter him into the Arc, and instead retired him to the Ballymany Stud, near the Curragh. He later explained to a racing journalist:

He was just an exceptional athlete. All through the spring and summer he completely dominated European racing in a very dramatic manner, and after he had run so uncharacteristically in the St. Leger, we knew something had gone wrong, but we didn't know what it was, so it was an easy decision to retire him before the Arc.

== Stud career ==
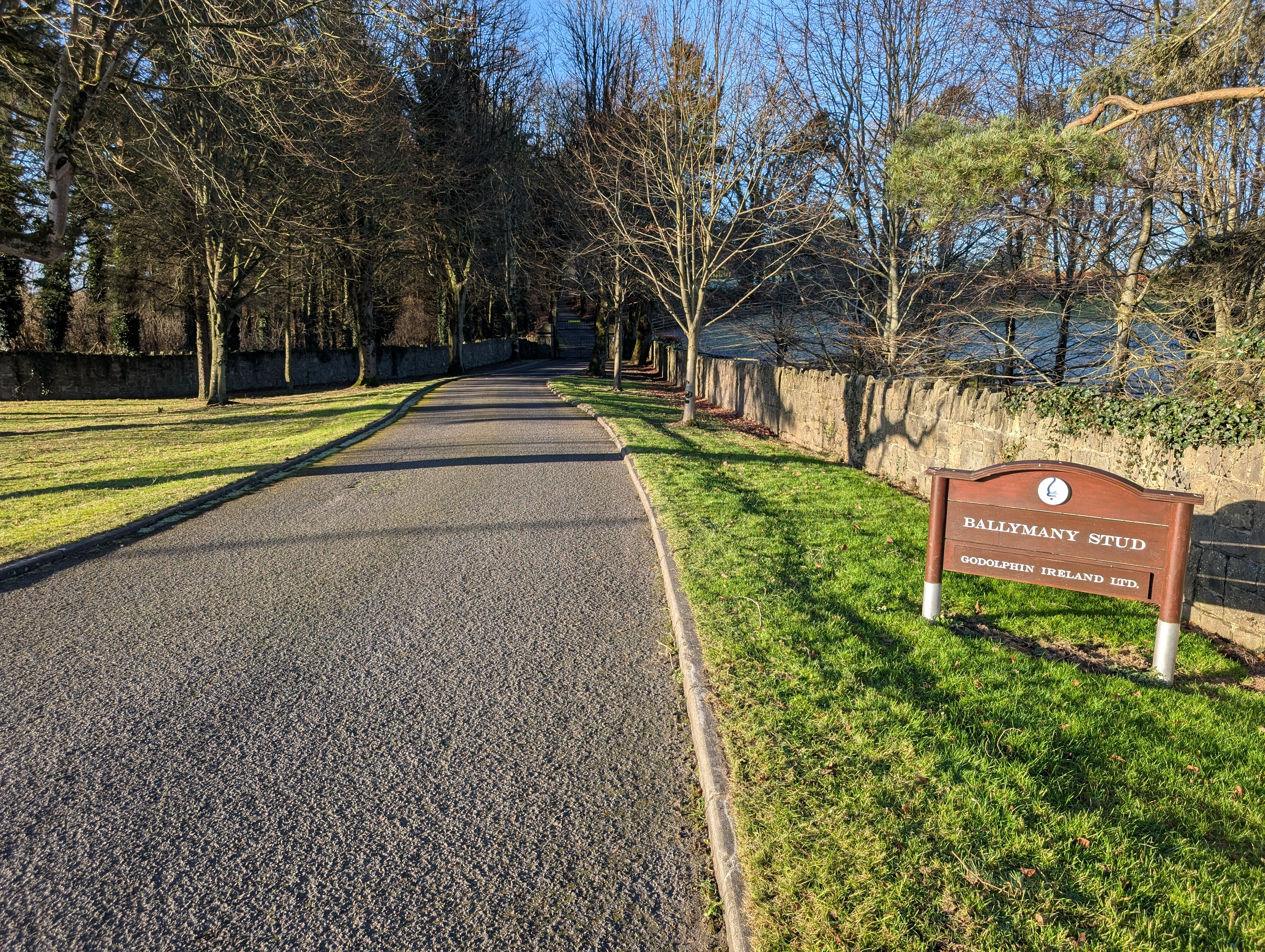
The entrance to Ballymany Stud, County Kildare

The Aga Khan turned down large offers to put Shergar to stud in the US, and instead chose to stand him at the Ballymany Stud in Ireland. He arrived in October 1981, and was paraded down the main street of Newbridge, County Kildare. Milton Toby, the writer on Thoroughbred racing and equine law, judges Shergar to have been "a national hero in Ireland. ... one of the most recognizable sports personalities—horse or human—in Ireland."

In 1982—his only breeding season—Shergar covered 44 mares, from which 35 foals were produced: 16 colts and 19 fillies. Of these, three won Group races, and the most successful of his progeny was Authaal. When sold as a weanling (between six months and a year) Authaal reached 325,000 guineas. (Note: Horses are traditionally sold in guineas, which are worth £1.05; 325,000 guineas equates to £393,750 in 1984 prices.) He was sold a year later, where he fetched 3.1 million guineas. In 1986 he won the Irish St. Leger by five lengths. Toby considers that Shergar's progeny were "perhaps not a disappointing first crop, but certainly below expectations for a horse with Shergar's racing prowess." The other Group winners were Maysoon (who was also placed in the 1,000 Guineas and Oaks) and Tashtiya.

At the start of February 1983 Shergar's second stud season was about to begin, and he was in high demand, and had a full book of 55 mares to cover. He was expected to earn £1 million for the season.

== February 1983 onwards ==
=== Theft ===
Ballymany Stud, County Kildare, from where Shergar was stolen

On 8 February 1983, at around 8:30 pm, three men—all armed and wearing masks—entered the house of Jim Fitzgerald, the head groom at Ballymany. They were part of a group of at least six, and possibly up to nine men. One of the men said to him "We have come for Shergar. We want £2 million for him." Fitzgerald said the men were not rough, although one of them who carried a pistol was very aggressive. Fitzgerald's family were locked into a room while he was taken, at gunpoint, out to Shergar's stable and was told to put the horse in the back of a horsebox.

After the horsebox was driven away Fitzgerald was told to lie on the floor of a van, and his face was covered with a coat. He was driven around for four hours before being released near the village of Kilcock, approximately 20 miles (32 km) from Ballymany. He was told not to contact the Garda Síochána (Gardaí)—the Irish police—or he and his family would be killed, but to wait for the gang to contact him. He was given the code phrase "King Neptune", which the gang would use to identify themselves. The men did not say that they were from the IRA, or give any other indication as to who they were, although one of the men spoke with a Northern Irish accent, and another seemed to be experienced with horses.

Fitzgerald walked on to the next village and called his brother to pick him up. On arrival back at Ballymany, he rang Ghislain Drion to inform him of the theft, and urged him not to call the police because of the threats that had been made. Drion attempted to reach the Aga Khan in Switzerland to inform him, then rang Stan Cosgrove, Shergar's vet, who was also a shareholder. Cosgrove contacted a retired Irish Army captain, Sean Berry, who was manager of the Irish Thoroughbred Breeders Association. Berry contacted Alan Dukes, a friend of his who was the serving Minister for Finance, who suggested that Berry speak to Michael Noonan, the Minister for Justice. Noonan and Dukes told him to call the Gardaí. By 4:00 am Drion had managed to contact the Aga Khan, who told him to phone the Gardaí straight away. The force were then contacted, but it was eight hours after Shergar had been stolen and any possible trail had already gone cold.

The Aga Khan had several reasons for non-payment of the ransom, including that he was only one of 35 members, and could not negotiate or pay on behalf of the others. He was unsure whether Shergar would be returned even if the money was paid, and concerned that, if the kidnappers' demands were met, it would make every high-value horse in Ireland a target for future thefts. The shareholders were divided on the approach. Brian Sweeney, a veteran of the American horseracing industry thought that "if you ask a mother who has had a child that has been kidnapped if a ransom should be paid, I think the answer would be 'yes, and quickly' "; another shareholder, Lord Derby, disagreed and said "if ransom money is paid for this horse, then there is a danger of other horses being kidnapped in the years to come—and that simply cannot be tolerated".

=== First approach by the thieves ===
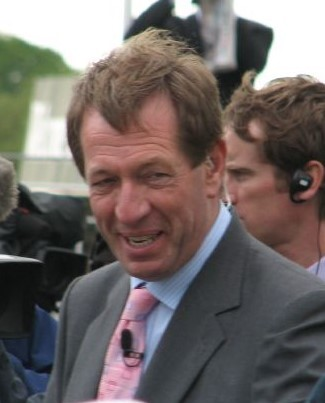
The sports commentator Derek Thompson, who became involved in the negotiations for Shergar

The first phone call from the thieves was on the night Shergar was stolen; (Note: Toby puts the call at "around midnight" on the Tuesday night, while the sports commentator Derek Thompson says it was at 1:30 am or 1:45 am on Wednesday morning.) Fitzgerald was not back at Ballymany by that time, and had not had the chance to tell the news of the theft to anyone. The call was to Jeremy Maxwell, a horse trainer based in Northern Ireland. The caller demanded £40,000, although this figure was later raised to £52,000. Maxwell was told that the negotiations would only be with three British horse racing journalists, Derek Thompson and John Oaksey of ITV and Peter Campling from The Sun. The men were told to be at the Europa Hotel in central Belfast by the Thursday evening; the Europa was known as the most bombed hotel in Europe after having suffered multiple bomb attacks during the Troubles.

When the three sports journalists arrived at the Europa, they were contacted by phone and told to go to the Maxwells' house to await further calls. On orders from the police, Thompson kept the person talking for as long as possible, but the caller rang off at 80 seconds—before the call could be traced. There were a series of calls to the Maxwells' house later that night, and at 1:30 am Thompson managed to keep the caller talking for over 90 seconds, which would have been enough to trace the call; he was told that the person who was doing the call intercepts had finished his shift at midnight and gone home. At 7:00 am on 12 February another call was put through to the Maxwells' house, which said that things had gone wrong, and that Shergar was dead.

Although a committee put together by the syndicate to co-ordinate their response later considered that this was a hoax, Toby argues that as the call about the theft preceded Fitzgerald's return to Ballymany—i.e. before anyone knew about the theft—and as the callers used the code phrase "King Neptune" in their communications, it is more likely that the calls, and the ensuing focus on the high-profile activity in Belfast, were undertaken to distract the authorities from what was happening with Shergar elsewhere.

=== Second approach by the thieves ===
On 9 February the thieves opened a second line of negotiation, contacting Ballymany Stud directly and speaking to Drion. The call, which came in at 4:05 pm, was short. Drion was not a fluent speaker of English and struggled to understand the Irish accent of the caller; the caller similarly had problems with Drion's heavy French pronunciation. Ninety minutes later, the caller tried again, with Drion asking him to speak slowly. A demand of £2 million was made for the return of Shergar, and for a contact number in France, through which further negotiations could be made. Drion provided the number of the Aga Khan's French office.

Probably one of the photographs sent by the thieves during the negotiations, as proof that Shergar was still alive (Note: The photograph was included in the security files researched by Milton Toby for his history of the events. He writes "Although there is no definitive evidence that this photograph ... was part of the proof offered, there is strong circumstantial evidence supporting that conclusion".)

The syndicate which owned Shergar brought in the risk and strategic consulting firm Control Risks to handle the negotiations. They negotiated from the Paris office, with a series of telephone calls over four days. On Friday 11 February the negotiators demanded proof that Shergar was still alive, as there had been some speculation in the press that Shergar was dead. The thieves said that a representative of the syndicate should go to the Crofton Hotel in Dublin and ask for any messages for "Johnny Logan"—the name of an Irish singer. Stan Cosgrove went to the hotel and asked for any messages. Armed members of the Special Detective Unit—the domestic security agency of the Gardaí—were present in an undercover role. No message was delivered, and Cosgrove returned home after waiting. Shortly afterwards the negotiators received a phone call from the thieves, angry at the presence of the police, and threatening that if any members of the gang were captured or killed, the negotiators and police would be murdered in retribution.

On Saturday 12 February the thieves contacted the negotiators and said that proof had been left at the Rosnaree Hotel. When this was picked up, it contained several polaroid pictures showing Shergar; some of the pictures showed the horse's head next to a copy of The Irish News, dated 11 February. Cosgrove saw the photograph and confirmed that "it definitely was him", although he added "It wasn't proof that the horse was alive ... at that point ... you'd want to get much more definite evidence ... if you'd have seen the complete horse it would have been different, but this was just the head."

In a telephone call from the thieves to the negotiators at 10:40 pm on 12 February, it was explained that the syndicate were not satisfied with the pictures of the horse, which, they explained, did not constitute enough proof. The caller told the negotiators "If you're not satisfied, that's it". The call was ended, and the thieves never made any further contact. The syndicate attempted to re-establish contact with the gang, but there was no response to newspaper requests to do so.

==== Negotiations examined ====
The syndicate committee put together a report for the full syndicate, which examined the possible motives behind the theft. They concluded that the theft of Shergar was either undertaken to create confusion and publicity, rather than obtaining money, or that the negotiations were undertaken with naivety. They reached this conclusion after taking a number of factors into account. Many of the demands were physically impossible: the ransom demand included £100 sterling notes, which did not exist. In one call at 5:45 pm to Drion in Ballymany, he was told to deliver the £2 million to Paris before noon the following day. In a call at 5:00 pm, the Paris negotiators were told to get £2 million by the end of the night—after the Parisian banks had closed. In another call, the negotiator in Paris was told to get agreement for a ransom, but told he should not contact anyone in Ireland, despite some of the shareholders being there. It also became clear during the course of the negotiations that the gang thought that the Aga Khan was the sole owner of Shergar; they had no knowledge of the other shareholders, and did not take into account the complexity of liaising and organising all 35 shareholders into a position of agreement.

=== Police investigation ===
The initial police investigation was hindered by the eight-hour lapse before the crime was reported, and by a local Thoroughbred auction, which meant several horseboxes were travelling in the area. Leading the investigation was Chief Superintendent James Murphy, a highly experienced detective. In his first press conference Murphy described how he was "slightly concerned" about the theft, and told reporters that "I have no leads". His comment about a lack of leads was not truthful, as Murphy withheld much information from the media, including the police finding the magazine for a Steyr MPi 69 submachine gun, which suggested a link to an IRA active service unit in South Armagh.

Murphy had a strong Irish brogue, wore a trilby hat and had a self-effacing sense of humour. At one press conference, he announced "A clue? That is something we haven't got". Several people claiming to have paranormal powers contacted the Gardaí with their thoughts; Murphy reported that "diviners, clairvoyants and psychic persons—they're in three different categories—they must be running into the fifties now". During one press conference, six photographers turned up wearing similar trilbies to the policeman; The Times called him a "stage Irishman". One reviewer of a documentary in 2004 called Murphy "the most richly comic copper since Inspector Clouseau". After eight days with no progress, he was replaced as the public figure of the investigation, but continued to lead it.

On 16 February a description of the horsebox used by the thieves—from a description given by Fitzgerald—was released. It was either light green or light blue with no working lights and no licence plates. The huge police search of possible hiding places for Shergar—by the Gardaí in the Irish Republic and the Royal Ulster Constabulary (RUC) in Northern Ireland—found no trace of the horse or horsebox, but several IRA caches of arms and explosives were uncovered, leading to the loss of several safe houses. Up to 70 detectives were working on the case at one point. Two weeks after Shergar was stolen, the police search was scaled down, although the investigation continued.

=== Speculation and hoaxes ===
With no definite news of Shergar's whereabouts, and with the Gardaí limiting the information they released to the press, the media took to speculation to cover the story. Baerlein observes that in reporting the Shergar case, "the press speculation was remarkable for its enthusiasm and its inaccuracy over a long period of time". Such media claims included that Shergar had been stolen by Colonel Gaddafi as part of a deal to supply arms to the IRA; that, according to the tabloid newspaper Sunday Sport, Shergar was spotted being ridden by the missing Lord Lucan; that a Middle Eastern horse breeder had stolen him for stud; and that the Mafia had undertaken the act to punish the Aga Khan over a previous sale of a horse which had gone badly.

Eight weeks after Shergar was stolen, Stan Cosgrove was approached by senior detectives within the Gardaí who introduced him to Dennis Minogue, a horse trainer. Minogue claimed to have a contact within the IRA who had shown him a photograph of Shergar, and that he could help get Shergar released for a ransom of IR£80,000. The Gardaí asked Cosgrove to assist them in a sting operation to lure the thieves out. Cosgrove agreed, and on 20 July 1983 Detective Garda Martin Kenirons assisted the operation. He put the money in the boot of his car in a remote village, which Minogue was to collect once the horse had been released. The following day Kenirons found the boot of his car forced open and the money missing. Minogue had also disappeared, and the money was never recovered.

A subsequent internal Gardaí enquiry dismissed Kenirons from the force for breaching Gardaí regulations. In an interview in 2018 he reiterated his long-stated innocence and said "when it all went wrong, everyone jumped for the high ground. They [the senior Gardaí officers] all denied that they had anything to do with the ransom."

=== Insurance ===
Shergar was insured through several insurance companies. The Lloyd's of London insurance brokers Hodgson McCreedy covered £3,625,000 of the total, and added a theft clause to the policy. Other shareholders—accountable for £1.5 million worth of shares—had insurance that did not include a theft clause; Cosgrove was one of the mortality-only insured members. Shareholders accounting for £3 million did not take out insurance; the Aga Khan was one of the uninsured members of the syndicate. Cosgrove was insured with Norwich Union (now part of Aviva), who refused to pay, even when it became clear that Shergar was probably dead; the company's liability was £144,000.

The 20 policies that included a theft clause were all settled in full in June 1983, even though there was a question of whether there was a need to. Terry Hall, an animal insurer with Lloyd's of London, observes that while theft was clear cut, the demand of a ransom meant that the action was considered extortion, rather than theft, which meant the mortality and theft policies did not have to be paid out. Legal advice was sought by Lloyd's of London, who were told that although it was a grey area, payment was advised.

== Possible identification of the criminals ==
Police and intelligence sources considered the IRA as the most likely suspects behind the theft. During the 1980s, the Irish republican movement followed the Armalite and ballot box strategy, in which electoral success was chased by Sinn Féin, while an armed struggle was continued by the IRA. The strategy was expensive, requiring payment for arms and explosives for the IRA, and for political activity, advertising and salaries for Sinn Féin. The annual budget for the movement was estimated at between £2 million and £5 million, and it was always under financial pressure.

In October 1981 the IRA Army Council—the leadership group of the organisation—approved the kidnapping of Ben Dunne, then head of the chain of Dunnes Stores. Dunne was released unharmed after a week; both the Dunne family and the Gardaí deny a ransom of £300,000 was paid. According to intelligence subsequently received by the intelligence sources, after the success of the operation, it was decided to undertake another ransom—through kidnapping or theft—this time of Shergar.

In 1999 Sean O'Callaghan, a former member of the IRA who had been working within the organisation as a supergrass for the Gardaí since 1980, published his autobiography. In it, he states that the plot to steal and ransom Shergar was devised by Kevin Mallon, a leading IRA member who sat on the Army Council; Mallon came up with the idea while serving time in Portlaoise Prison. Mallon was put in charge of a Special Operations unit with orders to raise several million pounds, and several IRA men were taken from under O'Callaghan's control in IRA Southern Command and put into Mallon's unit. These included the IRA members Gerry Fitzgerald, Paul Stewart, Rab Butler and Nicky Kehoe.

Two weeks after Shergar's kidnap, Gerry Fitzgerald told O'Callaghan that he had been involved in the theft, and that Shergar had been killed early on in the process after the horse panicked and no-one present could cope with him. In the process the horse injured its left leg and the decision was made to kill it. In his 1999 autobiography O'Callaghan states that Shergar "was killed within days" of the theft; in an interview for RTÉ, the Irish broadcaster, in 2004, he stated that Gerry Fitzgerald "strongly suggested that Shergar had been killed within hours of his kidnap". The IRA then kept up a deception that the horse was still alive and in their care.

Kevin O'Connor, a journalist with RTÉ, identifies three parts of the gang: a section to undertake high-profile activity in Belfast, to focus media attention in the north; one part negotiating discreetly with the Aga Khan; and one part guarding the horse.

According to O'Callaghan, in August 1983, in an effort to raise the money that they failed to do with the Shergar theft, Fitzgerald and his group attempted to kidnap the businessman Galen Weston at his home in County Wicklow. The Gardaí had been forewarned, and took over the house while Weston was in the UK. After a gun battle, Gerry Fitzgerald, Kehoe and three others were arrested. They received long prison sentences. O'Callaghan stated that "Essentially the same team that went to kidnap Shergar went to kidnap Galen Weston".

No arrests have ever been made in relation to Shergar's theft. The IRA have never admitted any role in the theft or its aftermath. Mallon and Kehoe deny any involvement in the events. Toby raises a query over O'Callaghan's story, saying the IRA informant was "a confessed informer whose life depending on his ability to weave a convincing web of lies. Without more evidence, O'Callaghan's story ... [is] just that, an interesting story."

In 2008 a special investigation by The Sunday Telegraph obtained information from another IRA member who said that O'Callaghan had not been told the full story "because the gang was so embarrassed by what happened": a vet that the IRA had arranged to look after Shergar did not turn up because his wife threatened to leave him if he did. Once the IRA realised that the Aga Khan was not going to pay, the Army Council ordered the horse to be released. The extensive search by the Gardaí hampered any release, and Mallon thought he was under close surveillance, and that releasing the horse was too risky, so, four days after the kidnapping, he ordered that it should be killed. The IRA source told the newspaper that two men went into the stable where Shergar was being held; one carried a machine gun:

Shergar was machine gunned to death. There was blood everywhere and the horse even slipped on his own blood. There was lots of cussin' and swearin' because the horse wouldn't die. It was a very bloody death.

In 2026 Zahra Aga Khan, the Aga Khan's daughter, stated that "We now know the horse was killed within two days [of being kidnapped]. They did so in an awful way."

== Remains ==
Ballinamore, County Leitrim, a possible location for Shergar's remains

Shergar's body has never been recovered or identified. Several sources, including O'Callaghan, The Sunday Telegraph and The Observer consider it likely that the body was buried near Aughnasheelin, near Ballinamore, County Leitrim. O'Callaghan said that as far as he knew, the remains had been buried on the farm of an IRA veteran from the 1940s, and that it would be difficult to get permission to dig on the land. Ballinamore is a town of strong republicanism, once nicknamed the "Falls Road of the South"—a reference to the Falls Road, Belfast, a highly republican area during the Troubles.

There have been several claims of equine skeletons being that of Shergar. Des Leadon, a specialist horse vet with knowledge of equine pathology, has assisted the Gardaí in several instances where a horse's remains may have been those of Shergar. He retains some strands of hair from Shergar's mane and tail which, he says, may contain sufficient DNA to confirm an identification.

== Legacy ==
In 1999, in honour of Shergar, the Shergar Cup was inaugurated at Goodwood Racecourse, in a format that put a European team of jockeys against one from the Middle East. The race was later moved to Ascot Racecourse and is a competition between four teams, Great Britain and Ireland, Europe, the rest of the world and an all-women team. The winners of the competition are presented with a trophy showing Shergar; this was donated by the Aga Khan.

On the twentieth anniversary of Shergar's Derby win, a bronze statuette of the horse was presented to the winning jockey. A statue of Shergar stands in the grounds of Gilltown Stud, one of the Aga Khan's Irish stud farms.

The story of Shergar's theft was made into a television play with Stephen Rea and Gary Waldhorn, broadcast in March 1986 as part of the BBC's Screen Two anthology series. The play was based on the few facts known, plus a backstory described as plausible by Hugh Hebert, reviewing for The Guardian. The theft was also dramatised as the film Shergar, directed by Dennis Lewiston and starring Ian Holm and Mickey Rourke. There have been three television documentaries: Who Kidnapped Shergar?, broadcast on RTÉ in March 2004; Searching for Shergar, broadcast on BBC One in June 2018; and Shergar: The Racehorse and the IRA, broadcast on Channel 4 in May 2026.

== Racing statistics ==
Shergar's career statistics
Race	Date	Age	Distance	Course	Odds	Time	Field	Finish	Margin	Jockey
Kris Plate	19 September 1980	2	1 mile	Newbury	11–8	1:38.71	23	1	2 1/2 lengths	Lester Piggott
William Hill Futurity Stakes	25 October 1980	2	1 mile	Doncaster	5–2	1:43.53	7	2	(2 1/2 lengths)	Lester Piggott
Guardian Newspaper Classic Trial	25 April 1981	3	1 1/4 miles	Sandown	Evens	2:09.35	9	1	10 lengths	Walter Swinburn
Chester Vase	5 May 1981	3	1 mile, 4 furlongs, 65 yards	Chester	4–11	2:40.47	10	1	12 lengths	Walter Swinburn
Derby Stakes	3 June 1981	3	1 1/2 miles	Epsom	10–11	2:44.21	18	1	10 lengths	Walter Swinburn
Irish Sweeps Derby	27 June 1981	3	1 1/2 miles	The Curragh	1–3	2:32.7	12	1	4 lengths	Lester Piggott
King George VI and Queen Elizabeth Diamond Stakes	25 July 1981	3	1 1/2 miles	Ascot	2–5	2:35.4	7	1	4 lengths	Walter Swinburn
St Leger Stakes	12 September 1981	3	1 mile, 6 furlongs, 127 yards	Doncaster	4–9	3:11.6	7	4	(11 1/2 lengths)	Walter Swinburn

Earnings from races
Year	Age	Starts	Win (1st)	Place (2nd)	Earnings (£)
1980	2	2	1	1	68,630
1981	3	6	5	–	371,566
Total		8	6	1	440,196

== Pedigree ==
Pedigree of Shergar (GB), bay stallion 1978
Sire Great Nephew	Honeyway	Fairway	Phalaris
Sire Great Nephew	Honeyway	Fairway	Scapa Flow
Sire Great Nephew	Honeyway	Honey Buzzard	Papyrus
Sire Great Nephew	Honeyway	Honey Buzzard	Lady Peregrine
Sire Great Nephew	Sybil's Niece	Admiral's Walk	Hyperion
Sire Great Nephew	Sybil's Niece	Admiral's Walk	Tabaris
Sire Great Nephew	Sybil's Niece	Sybil's Sister	Nearco
Sire Great Nephew	Sybil's Niece	Sybil's Sister	Sister Sarah
Dam Sharmeen	Val de Loir	Vieux Manoir	Brantôme
Dam Sharmeen	Val de Loir	Vieux Manoir	Vielle Maison
Dam Sharmeen	Val de Loir	Vali	Sunny Boy
Dam Sharmeen	Val de Loir	Vali	Her Slipper
Dam Sharmeen	Nasreen	Charlottesville	Prince Chevalier
Dam Sharmeen	Nasreen	Charlottesville	Noorani
Dam Sharmeen	Nasreen	Ginetta	Tulyar
Dam Sharmeen	Nasreen	Ginetta	Diableretta (Family 9-c)

== See also ==
- Corrida (horse)
- Fanfreluche (horse)
- List of racehorses

== Notes and references ==
=== Sources ===
==== Books ====
- Adams, James (1986). The Financing of Terror. Sevenoaks, Kent: New English Library. ISBN 978-0-450-06086-1.
- Baerlein, Richard (1984). Shergar: And the Aga Khan's Thoroughbred Empire. London: Michael Joseph. ISBN 978-0-7181-2176-1.
- The Bloodstock Breeders' Annual Review. Vol. 57. Newmarket, Suffolk: British Bloodstock Agency. 1968. ISBN 978-0-9020-8500-8.
- Clutterbuck, Richard (1987). Kidnap, Hijack and Extortion: The Response. London: Palgrave Macmillan. ISBN 978-1-349-18754-6.
- Connelly, Mark (2012). The IRA on Film and Television: A History. Jefferson, NC: McFarland & Company. ISBN 978-0-7864-8961-9.
- David, Roy (1986). The Shergar Mystery. Melplash, Dorset: Trainers Record. ISBN 978-0-907441-15-1.
- Moloney, Ed (2007). A Secret History of the IRA (Kindle ed.). London: Penguin. ISBN 978-0-141-90069-8.
- O'Callaghan, Sean (1999). The Informer. London: Corgi. ISBN 978-0-552-14607-4.
- Pickering, Martin; Ross, Michael (1985). Pedigrees of Leading Winners, 1981–1984. Lexington, KY: University Press of Kentucky. ISBN 978-0-85131-413-6.
- Thompson, Derek (2013). Tommo: Too Busy to Die. Newbury, Berkshire: Racing Post Books. ISBN 978-1-9094-7103-0.
- Toby, Milton C. (2018). Taking Shergar: Thoroughbred Racing's Most Famous Cold Case (Kindle ed.). Lexington, KY: University Press of Kentucky. ISBN 978-0-8131-7636-9.
- Turner, Alwyn W. (2010). Rejoice! Rejoice!: Britain in the 1980s. London: Aurum Press. ISBN 978-1-84513-729-8.
- Turner, Colin (1984). In Search of Shergar. London: Sigwick & Jackson. ISBN 978-0-4500-5783-0.

==== Journals ====
- Hannigan, John A. (October 1985). "The Armalite and the Ballot Box: Dilemmas of Strategy and Ideology in the Provisional IRA". Social Problems. 33 (1): 31–40. doi:10.2307/800629. JSTOR 800629.
- Moloney, Ed (May 1989). "Mistaken Strategy". Fortnight (273): 9–10. JSTOR 25551945.
- Wilkinson, Paul (Spring 1982). "The Provisional IRA: An Assessment in the Wake of the 1981 Hunger Strike". Government and Opposition. 17 (2): 140–156. doi:10.1111/j.1477-7053.1982.tb00327.x. JSTOR 44483416. S2CID 144227650.

==== News articles ====
- Alderson, Andrew; Byrne, Nicola (27 January 2008). "The Truth About Shergar Racehorse Kidnapping". The Daily Telegraph. Archived from the original on 24 February 2018.
- Armytage, Marcus (13 June 2026). "I Know the Full Story of how Shergar Died; Aga Khan's Daughter Reveals Truth about the Grisly End of the 'Kindest Horse in the World'". The Daily Telegraph. p. 9.
- Baerlein, Richard (21 September 1980a). "The Fastest Milers on Four Legs". The Observer. p. 3.
- Baerlein, Richard (27 October 1980b). "Was Beldale Flutter flattered?". The Guardian. p. 17.
- Baerlein, Richard (6 May 1981a). "Shergar Wins in Derby Fashion". The Guardian. p. 21.
- Baerlein, Richard (4 June 1981b). "Spectacular Shergar by yet Another Ten Lengths". The Guardian. p. 23.
- Baerlein, Richard (7 June 1981c). "Shergar, Simply the Greatest". The Guardian. p. 23.
- Baerlein, Richard (29 June 1981d). "Shergar, 'One of the Best I've Ridden', Says Piggott". The Guardian. p. 21.
- Baerlein, Richard (26 July 1981e). "Shergar Proves he's the Best". The Observer. p. 24.
- Bedford, Julian (8 February 2013). "Shergar: The Day the Wonder Horse was Stolen". BBC World Service.
- Fitzpatrick, Richard (8 February 2013). "30 years on: What happened to Shergar?". RTÉ.
- Flynn, Sean (8 March 1986). "Garda Dismissed in Shergar Case". The Irish Times. p. 1.
- Ford, Richard (17 February 1983). "'Stage Irishman' Leaves Limelight". The Times. p. 3.
- "Haughey Placed, FitzGerald Nobbled". The Economist. 19 February 1983. pp. 58–59.
- Hebert, Hugh (24 March 1986). "Horse and Hounds". The Guardian. p. 21.
- "Horse racing's answer to the Ryder Cup: Europe V Middle East". The Evening Standard. 27 April 1999. p. 66.
- Kelner, Martin (22 March 2004). "Backpages: Horsey and detectivey fields stumped by Shergar". The Guardian. p. 32.
- Montgomery, Sue (1 October 1998). "Racing: Yearling Colt goes for 2.2m Guineas". The Independent.
- Murtagh, Peter (11 November 1983). "£80,000 Paid for Shergar Missing, say Garda Sources". The Irish Times. p. 1.
- Phillips, Michael (4 June 1981a). "Shergar is in a Masterclass of his Own". The Times. p. 11.
- Phillips, Michael (27 July 1981b). "Shergar Wins but Magic is Missing". The Times. p. 13.
- "Racehorse Sold for Record-Breaking £5.25m". The Daily Telegraph. 10 October 2013.
- "Racing". The Observer. 26 October 1980. p. 23.
- Seely, Michael (20 September 1980a). "Castle Keep Should Repel Invaders". The Times. p. 16.
- Seely, Michael (27 October 1980b). "Shergar is on the Right Lines". The Times. p. 10.
- Seely, Michael (27 April 1981a). "No Getting Away From To-Agori-Mou". The Times. p. 7.
- Seely, Michael (6 May 1981b). "Emphatic Shergar Win Stakes his Derby Claim". The Times. p. 9.
- "Shergar shrouded in mystery 20 years on". Irish News. 12 February 2003. p. 6.
- Slot, Owen (3 June 2001). "'I'll Never Forget That Night the IRA Led Shergar into the Box Without a Problem'". The Sunday Telegraph. p. 12.
- "Stud Poker. An extraordinary time at the horses". The Economist. 21 December 1985. pp. 86–88.
- Walker, Michael (4 June 1995). "Did Shergar Finish in this One-Horse Town?". The Observer. p. 9.
- Wood, Greg (8 May 1999). "Racing: Shergar Cup is Cause for Celebration". The Independent. p. 26.
- Zachary, G. Pascal (9 July 2007). "The Aga Khan, a jet-setter who mixes business and Islam". The New York Times.

==== Internet and television media ====
- "Aviva plc: Landmark Events". Aviva plc. 2008. Archived from the original on 23 October 2008.
- Cairns, Alex. "Inside Racing's Greatest Drama". Gallop.
- "Dubai Duty Free Shergar Cup and Concert". Ascot Racecourse.
- "Great Nephew (GB) > Stallion Reports". Japan Bloodhorse Breeders' Association.
- "History". Aga Khan Studs.
- "Irish Derby: 1981–1990". The Curragh Racecourse. Archived from the original on 22 March 2016.
- "Karim Al-Hussayni". The Muslim 500. The Royal Islamic Strategic Studies Centre. 27 May 2018.
- "Mumtaz Mahal". Thoroughbred Heritage.
- Eklund, Björn; Rosenkjær, Nalle. "The Classic Races". Gallop.
- Searching for Shergar (Television production). BBC. 7 June 2018.
- "Searching for Sher-gar". BBC.
- "Shergar". Aga Khan Studs.
- "Shergar: The Racehorse and the IRA". Channel 4.
- "Shergar (2000)". British Film Institute. Archived from the original on 2 October 2018.
- "Shergar (GB)" (pdf). equineline.com. The Jockey Club.
- Who Kidnapped Shergar? (Television production). RTÉ. 11 March 2004.
- "Who Kidnapped Shergar?...Find Out This Week!". Irish Film and Television Network. 8 March 2004. Archived from the original on 22 January 2021.
