= Grundy (horse) =

British Thoroughbred racehorse and sire (1972–1992)

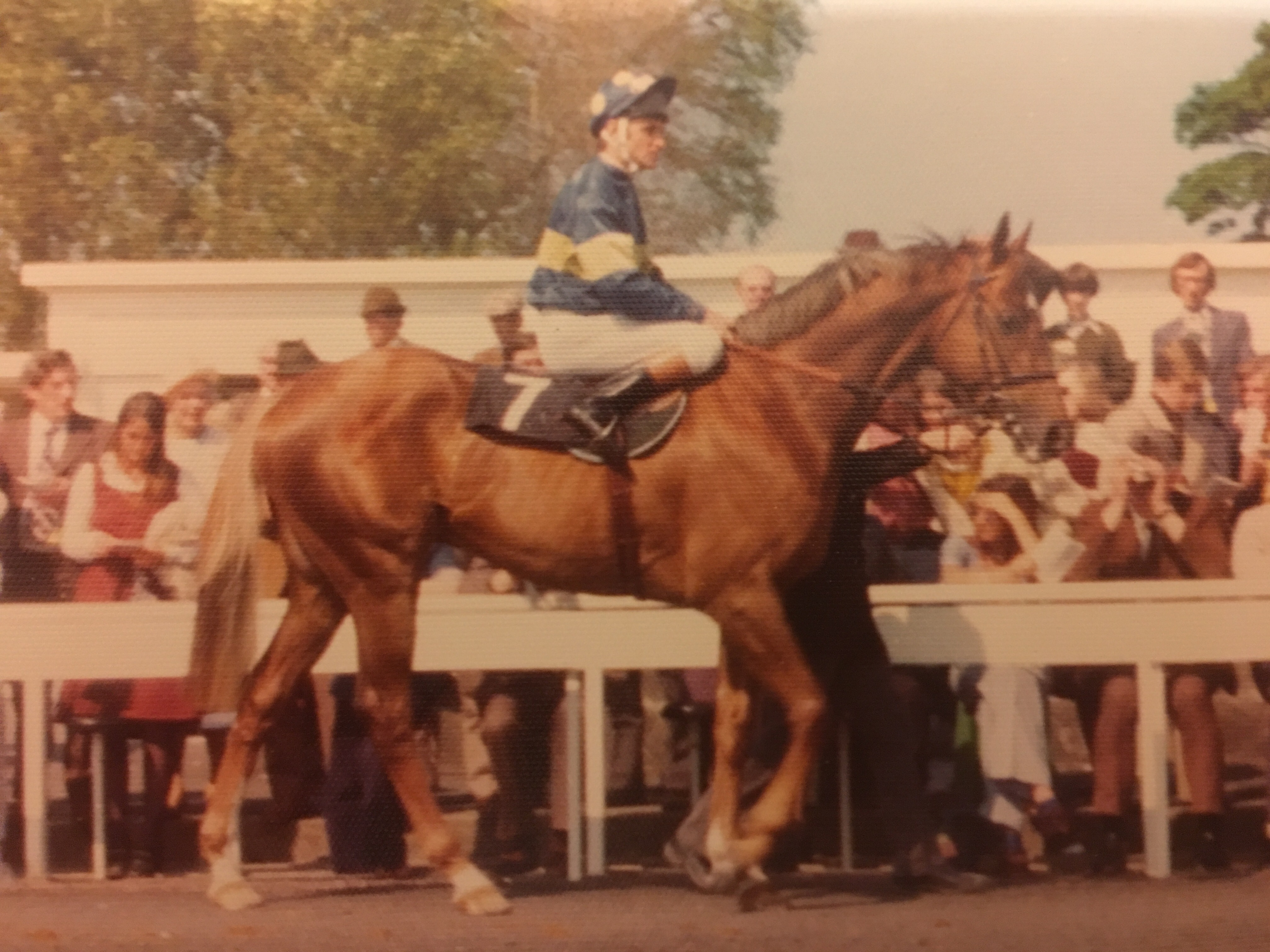
- Grundy at the 1975 Irish 2000 Guineas
- Sire: Great Nephew
- Grandsire: Honeyway
- Dam: Word From Lundy
- Damsire: Worden
- Sex: Stallion
- Foaled: 1972
- Country: Ireland
- Colour: Chestnut
- Breeder: Overbury Stud
- Owner: Carlo Vittadini
- Trainer: Peter Walwyn
- Record: 11: 8-2-0
- Earnings: £326,421

Major wins
- Sirenia Stakes (1974); Champagne Stakes (1974); Dewhurst Stakes (1974); Irish Derby (1975); Irish 2,000 Guineas (1975); Epsom Derby (1975); King George VI and Queen Elizabeth Stakes (1975)

Awards
- British Champion Two-Year-Old Colt (1974, Free Handicap); Timeform Top-rated two-year-old (1974); Timeform Top-rated Horse (1975); Timeform Horse of the Year (1975); British Horse of the Year (1975); Timeform rating: 137
- Last updated on 16 June 2023

Grundy (1972–1992) was a British Thoroughbred racehorse. In a racing career which lasted from July 1974 until August 1975, he ran eleven times and won eight races. He was the leading British two-year-old of 1974, when his wins included the Champagne Stakes and the Dewhurst Stakes. In 1975 he was narrowly beaten in the 2000 Guineas but went on to win the Irish 2000 Guineas and the Epsom and Irish Derbies. He is best remembered for his win over Bustino in the King George VI and Queen Elizabeth Diamond Stakes, which has been described as Britain's "Race of the Century". He was retired to stud at the end of 1975 and had some success as a sire of winners. He was exported to Japan, where he died in 1992.

== Background ==
Grundy was a chestnut horse with a white blaze and flaxen mane and tail. bred by Overbury Stud near Tewkesbury, in Gloucestershire, England. He was a son of Great Nephew who also sired Epsom Derby winner Shergar and the Canadian Horse Racing Hall of Fame filly, Carotene. His dam, Word From Lundy, was a daughter of the French runner Worden, whose wins included Italy's Premio Roma and the 1953 Washington, D.C. International Stakes in the United States. Word From Lundy won over two miles, but was from a family which was noted for its speed, having produced the leading sprinter Tower Walk.

In 1973 the yearling was sent to the Newmarket October sales where he was bought by the bloodstock agent Keith Freeman for 11,000 guineas. Freeman was acting on behalf of Carlo Vittadini, an Italian banker who owned a stud farm in Italy and later Beech House Stud at Newmarket, England.

The colt was sent into training with Peter Walwyn at Seven Barrows, Lambourn in Berkshire. Grundy was ridden in all his races by the Irish jockey Pat Eddery.

== Racing career ==
=== 1974: two-year-old season ===
Grundy made his first racecourse appearance at Ascot in July 1974. He won the Granville Stakes over six furlongs, defeating his stable companion No Alimony, who went on to win the Craven Stakes and the Predominate Stakes in 1975. In August he won the Sirenia Stakes over the same distance at Kempton from Prospect Rainbow.

In September, Grundy was sent to Doncaster to contest the Champagne Stakes in which he was matched against the Coventry Stakes winner Whip It Quick. Eddery struggled to obtain a clear run in the straight but succeeded in getting Grundy to the line half a length ahead of Whip It Quick without having to use the whip.

On his final start of the season, Grundy ran in the Dewhurst Stakes at Newmarket. In this race he was pitted against the Irish-trained Steel Heart, an exceptionally fast colt who had won the Gimcrack Stakes and the Middle Park Stakes. Racing on soft ground for the first time, Grundy went to the front two furlongs from the finish and pulled clear to beat Steel Heart by six lengths. In the Free Handicap, a ranking of the year's best British juveniles, Grundy was placed first with a rating of 133. Timeform rated him the best two-year-old in Europe on 134.

=== 1975: three-year-old season ===
Grundy's preparation for the British Classic Races was interrupted in March by a training accident at Seven Barrows when he was kicked in the face by another three-year-old colt, Corby. He made his three-year-old debut in the Greenham Stakes at Newbury in April. Running on very heavy ground he lost his unbeaten record when he finished second by two lengths to Mark Anthony. In the 2000 Guineas at Newmarket, Grundy started 7/2 favourite in a field of 24 runners but finished second again, beaten half a length by the 33/1 outsider Bolkonski. The start of the race had been delayed for twenty minutes by protests by striking stable lads. Grundy was then sent to Ireland for the Irish 2,000 Guineas at the Curragh. He took the lead at the midway point of the race and "romped away" to win comfortably by one and a half lengths from the French-trained Monsanto with Mark Anthony a length away in third to record his first win of the season.

On 4 June Grundy was sent off the 5/1 second favourite for The Derby. The Derby attracted a crowd reported to number 750,000, which included Queen Elizabeth II, the Queen Mother and the Duke of Edinburgh. The 6/4 favourite for the race was the French-trained Green Dancer, who had won the Observer Gold Cup on his previous visit to Britain, and had since won the Poule d'Essai des Poulains and the Prix Lupin. Grundy was restrained by Eddery in the early stages before moving up to fourth place on the turn into the straight. Grundy overtook the front-running Anne's Pretender to take the lead a furlong and a half from the finish and pulled clear to win by three lengths from the filly Nobiliary with Hunza Dancer in third. Three weeks after his win at Epsom, Grundy was sent to the Curragh for the Irish Derby for which he started 9/10 favourite. Despite trailing in seventh place coming into the home straight, he broke away from the field in the closing stages and won decisively by two lengths from King Pellinore and Anne's Pretender.

==== Britain's "Race of the Century" ====
In The Observer's list of the "10 greatest horse races of all time," the match between Grundy and Bustino in the King George VI and Queen Elizabeth Stakes at Ascot Racecourse on 26 July 1975 was ranked number two.

Three-year-old Grundy started 5/4 on favourite against a very solid field in the King George VI and Queen Elizabeth Stakes that was open to older horses. The participants included Eclipse Stakes winner [and later winner of the Prix de l'Arc de Triomphe], Star Appeal, Dibidale, winner of the 1974 Irish Oaks, Nelson Bunker Hunt's mare, Dahlia, one of the greatest female horses in Thoroughbred racing history and winner of this race in 1973 and 1974, and Lady Beaverbrook's four-year-old horse Bustino, the winner of the previous year's St. Leger Stakes Classic.

Bustino's two pacemaker stablemates, Highest and Kinglet, set a blistering early pace in the 2,414 metre (1½ miles) race that was designed to wear down Grundy, to diminish his trademark finishing acceleration. With the pacemakers' jobs done and half a mile left to run, Bustino and jockey Joe Mercer moved into the lead. He was ahead by four lengths by the time they entered the top of the straight when Pat Eddery on Grundy mounted a charge. The two horses began pulling away from the rest of the field and with a furlong left to run, Grundy caught and passed Bustino who in turn refused to quit and retook the lead. Just fifty yards from the finish line, a relentless Grundy fought back and recaptured the lead, holding off Bustino's continued furious effort to win by half a length after a "thrilling duel" with Dahlia another five lengths behind in third.

Grundy's winning time of 2:26.98 broke the race record by almost two and a half seconds, the record stood until 2010 when Harbinger ran 2:26.78 over a slightly modified course. As sometimes happens, a race of this nature took a toll on both horses. Bustino and Grundy appeared totally exhausted as they returned to the unsaddling enclosure. Bustino never raced again.

Despite immediate concerns, Grundy appeared to recover well from his exertions and reappeared three weeks later in the Benson and Hedges Gold Cup at York. He failed to reproduce anything approaching his best form, however, and finished a tired fourth behind Dahlia, Card King and Star Appeal, all of whom he had beaten comfortably at Ascot. Grundy was then retired to stud.

== Assessment and honours ==
In 1974, Grundy was given a rating of 134 by Timeform, making him the top-rated two-year-old in Europe. He was also the top-rated juvenile in the Free Handicap. In 1975, Grundy was Timeform's highest rated horse with a rating of 137. Grundy's 1975 rating was the sixth-highest rating ever given to a British three-year-old colt up to that time, behind Tudor Minstrel, Mill Reef, Brigadier Gerard, Pappa Fourway and Abernant.

Grundy's earnings of £326,421 broke the record for a horse trained in Britain or Ireland which had previously been held by Mill Reef. The record was broken by The Minstrel in 1977.

In 1975, Grundy was voted British Horse of the Year by the Racegoers' Club, receiving 38 of the 40 votes.

In their book A Century of Champions, John Randall and Tony Morris rated Grundy a "great" Derby winner and the twenty-fifth best British or Irish racehorse of the 20th century.

== Stud career ==
Until 1984, Grundy stood at the British National Stud. A moderately successful stallion, Grundy's Group One winners include the 1980 Epsom Oaks winner, Bireme, the 1981 Gran Premio d'Italia winner, Kirtling, and the 1983 Ascot Gold Cup victor, Little Wolf.

In November 1983, Grundy was sold for £1,600,000 and exported to stand in Japan where he died in 1992.

== Breeding ==
Pedigree of Grundy (IRE), chestnut stallion, 1972
Sire Great Nephew (GB)	Honeyway	Fairway	Phalaris
Sire Great Nephew (GB)	Honeyway	Fairway	Scapa Flow
Sire Great Nephew (GB)	Honeyway	Honey Buzzard	Papyrus
Sire Great Nephew (GB)	Honeyway	Honey Buzzard	Lady Peregrine
Sire Great Nephew (GB)	Sybil's Niece	Admiral's Walk	Hyperion
Sire Great Nephew (GB)	Sybil's Niece	Admiral's Walk	Tabaris
Sire Great Nephew (GB)	Sybil's Niece	Sybil's Sister	Nearco
Sire Great Nephew (GB)	Sybil's Niece	Sybil's Sister	Sister Sarah
Dam Word From Lundy	Worden	Wild Risk	Rialto
Dam Word From Lundy	Worden	Wild Risk	Wild Violet
Dam Word From Lundy	Worden	Sans Tares	Sind
Dam Word From Lundy	Worden	Sans Tares	Tara
Dam Word From Lundy	Lundy Princess	Princely Gift	Nasrullah
Dam Word From Lundy	Lundy Princess	Princely Gift	Blue Gem
Dam Word From Lundy	Lundy Princess	Lundy Parrott	Flamingo
Dam Word From Lundy	Lundy Princess	Lundy Parrott	Waterval (Family 8-k)
