= Great Nephew =

British-bred Thoroughbred racehorse (1963–1986)

- Sire: Honeyway
- Grandsire: Fairway
- Dam: Sybil's Niece
- Damsire: Admiral's Walk
- Sex: Stallion
- Foaled: 1963
- Country: Great Britain
- Colour: Chestnut
- Breeder: Hon. James Perrott Philipps
- Owner: Dalham Hall
- Trainer: Jack Jarvis; Etienne Pollet
- Record: 22: 5-6-4
- Earnings: $184,910

Major wins
- Prix du Moulin de Longchamp (1967); Prix Dollar (1967)

Awards
- Leading sire in GB & Ireland (1975, 1981)
- Last updated on 16 June 2023

Great Nephew (1963 – 31 May 1986) was a British thoroughbred who became a champion miler in France. He was also a very successful sire, producing two Derby winners. Great Nephew was trained as a two-year-old and for part of the following season by Jack Jarvis. After finishing second in the 2000 Guineas, he was transferred to France to be trained by Etienne Pollet.

== Stud career ==
Great Nephew sired many stakes winners, such as like Champion Canadian Mare Carotene and ill-fated Derby winner Shergar. He was Champion English Sire two times: once in 1975 and again in 1981. He Died on 31 May 1986 at Dalham Hall Stud Newmarket.

His Best Progeny:

- Grundy ch. C (1972) - English Champion 2yo and Champion 3yo Colt, English and Irish Derby winner
- Nikoli b. c. (1977) - Irish 2000 Guineas winner
- Mrs Penny chestnut filly (1977) – English Champion 2yo and 3yo Filly, Champion 3yo Filly in Ireland
- Shergar b. C (1978) - European Horse of the Year, English and Irish Derby winner
- Tolmi, bay filly (1978), joint-top-rated European two-year-old filly
- Carotene ch. F (1983) - Champion 3YO Turf Horse in Canada (1986, 1987, 1988)

== See also ==
- List of racehorses
