= Cairn Rouge =

Irish Thoroughbred racehorse (1977–after 1998)

- Racing silks of David Brady & Craig Singer
- Sire: Pitcairn
- Grandsire: Petingo
- Dam: Little Hills
- Damsire: Candy Cane
- Sex: Mare
- Foaled: 9 March 1977
- Country: Ireland
- Colour: Bay
- Breeder: Janet Brady
- Owner: David Brady/Craig Singer
- Trainer: Michael Cunningham/George Getz
- Record: 15: 6-3-0

Major wins
- Mulcahy Stakes (1980); Irish 1,000 Guineas (1980); Coronation Stakes (1980); Champion Stakes (1980)

Awards
- Timeform rating 99 (1979), 127 (1980), 126 (1981)

Honours
- Cairn Rouge Stakes at Killarney Racecourse

Cairn Rouge (9 March 1977 – after 1998) was an Irish Thoroughbred racehorse and broodmare. After showing promise as a two-year-old in 1979, Cairn Rouge improved to become one of the best three-year-old fillies in Europe in the following year. She won the Irish 1,000 Guineas and the Coronation Stakes against horses of her own age and sex, before defeating strong weight-for-age competition in the Champion Stakes. She failed to win in five starts as a four-year-old, but showed good form when finishing second in a controversial race for the Champion Stakes. After a brief, unsuccessful period racing in North America she was retired to stud, where she had some success as a broodmare.

== Background ==
Cairn Rouge was a small, lightly built, dark-coated bay mare with a white star bred in Ireland by Janet Brady. She was one of the second crop of foals sired by the Goodwood Mile winner Pitcairn, who also sired Ela-Mana-Mou before being exported to Japan in 1978. She was the first foal of dam Little Hills, who won on the flat and over hurdles. Little Hills' grand-dam Stone Crop was a half-sister of the Ascot Gold Cup winner Zarathustra.

As a yearling, Cairn Rouge was sent to the sales, but was bought back by her breeders for 3000 guineas. She was sent into training with Michael Cunningham, who was best known for his successes in National Hunt races.

== Racing career ==
=== 1979: two-year-old season ===
After finishing unplaced in a one-mile race on her debut, Cairn Rouge won a maiden race over 8 1/2 furlongs at Galway Racecourse in September, beating Cassia by four lengths. In October she was sent to England to contest the Malton Stakes over seven furlongs at York Racecourse. She accelerated into the lead a furlong from the finish and won by 1 1/2 lengths from Miss Taymore and Louise Moulton.

=== 1980: three-year-old season ===
On her three-year-old debut, Cairn Rouge finished unplaced in a race over seven furlongs on very heavy ground on 17 March. In April she won the Mulcahy Stakes over seven furlongs at Phoenix Park Racecourse, beating the highly regarded Monroe by three lengths. Cairn Rouge was then moved up in class for the Irish 1,000 Guineas at the Curragh on 26 May in which she was matched against the leading English fillies Mrs Penny and Millingdale Lillie. Ridden by Tony Murray, she started at odds of 5/1 in a field of eighteen fillies. Cairn Rouge took the lead inside the final quarter mile and accelerated clear of the field to win decisively by 2 1/2 lengths from Millingdale Lillie. In June, the filly was sent to England for the Coronation Stakes (then a Group Two race) over one mile at Royal Ascot in which she faced the 1000 Guineas winner Quick As Lightning at level weights. Ridden by Murray, Cairn Rouge started the 6/5 favourite and produced a strong late run on the inside to win by a neck from Quick As Lightning.

At York on 19 August, Cairn Rouge was matched against colts and older horses for the first time in the Benson and Hedges Gold Cup over 10 1/2 furlongs. The filly took the lead in the last quarter mile but was overtaken in the final strides and was beaten half a length by Master Willie. She was then sent to France and moved up in distance for the Prix Vermeille over 2400 metres at Longchamp Racecourse in September. Racing on ground which was firmer than she had previously encountered she fifth in a very strong field behind Mrs Penny, Little Bonny, Detroit and Gold River. Cairn Rouge's final appearance of the season came in the Champion Stakes over ten furlongs at Newmarket Racecourse in October when she started at odds of 6/1. Murray restrained the filly before producing her with a strong late run in the final quarter mile. She took the lead inside the final furlong and won by three-quarters of a length from Master Willie, with Nadjar in third and Rankin in fourth place.

=== 1981: four-year-old season ===
In April 1981, Cairn Rouge was bought for $1.5 million by Craig Singer of Lewisville, Texas. Cairn Rouge began her three-year-old season at Royal Ascot in June, when she started favourite for the Prince of Wales's Stakes but finished fifth behind Hard Fought. The filly returned from the race with a minor injury which kept her off the racecourse for three months. She returned in the Desmond Stakes at the Curragh over one mile in which she was beaten a short head by the three-year-old colt Belted Earl. In October Cairn Rouge attempted to repeat her 1980 win in the Champion Stakes in a field which included To-Agori-Mou, Master Willie, Madam Gay and The Wonder. She ran on strongly in the last quarter mile to finish second, two lengths behind the French-trained three-year-old Vayrann. The winner failed a post-race drug test, but was allowed to keep the race following a private session of the Jockey Club's disciplinary committee on 7 June 1982.

Cairn Rouge was sent to race in the United States in late 1981, where she was trained by George Getz. On 7 November she finished fourth behind Providential, April Run and Galaxy Libra in the Washington, D.C. International Stakes. In December she finished sixth behind Super Moment in the Bay Meadows Handicap.

== Assessment ==
In 1979, the independent Timeform organisation gave Cairn Rouge a rating of 99, twenty-one pounds below the top-rated two-year-old filly Aryenne. In 1980 she was rated 127 by Timeform, four pounds below the top-rated three-year-old filly Detroit. In the official International Classification she was rated the fourth best three-year-old filly in Europe behind Detroit, Mrs Penny and Shoot A Line. She was also the highest-rated Irish three-year-old of either sex. In the following year she was rated 126 by Timeform and was officially rated the third-best older female horse in Europe behind Gold River and Detroit.

== Breeding record ==
Cairn Rouge produced at least nine foals between 1983 and 1998, five of whom won races:

- Tikanova (bay filly, foaled 1983, sired by Northern Dancer), unraced. Female-line ancestor of Epoca d'Oro.
- Ajuga (chestnut filly, 1985, by The Minstrel), won one race, dam of Prolix (Dee Stakes), Bad Bertrich Again (EuropaChampionat). Female-line ancestor of Persuasive and Creative Force.
- Roupala (bay filly, 1986, by Vaguely Noble), won one race, dam of Vortex (Criterion Stakes) and ancestress of 2022 Saudi Cup winner Emblem Road
- Devils Rock (chestnut colt, 1990, by Devil's Bag), won one race
- Red Victory (brown colt, 1991, by Al Nasr), failed to win in five races
- Di Hwang (bay colt, 1994, by Sadler's Wells), won one race
- Captain Melleray (colt, 1995, by Fairy King), unraced
- Fontanina (bay filly, 1997, by Lake Coniston), unraced
- Best Buy (bay filly, 1998, by Danehill), won two races

== Pedigree ==
Pedigree of Cairn Rouge (GB), bay mare, 1977
Sire Pitcairn (IRE) 1971	Petingo (GB); 1965	Petition	Fair Trial
Sire Pitcairn (IRE) 1971	Petingo (GB); 1965	Petition	Art Paper
Sire Pitcairn (IRE) 1971	Petingo (GB); 1965	Alcazar	Alycidon
Sire Pitcairn (IRE) 1971	Petingo (GB); 1965	Alcazar	Quarterdeck
Sire Pitcairn (IRE) 1971	Border Bounty (GB); 1965	Bounteous	Rockefella
Sire Pitcairn (IRE) 1971	Border Bounty (GB); 1965	Bounteous	Marie Elizabeth
Sire Pitcairn (IRE) 1971	Border Bounty (GB); 1965	B Flat	Chanteur
Sire Pitcairn (IRE) 1971	Border Bounty (GB); 1965	B Flat	Ardeen
Dam Little Hills (IRE) 1971	Candy Cane (GB); 1965	Crepello	Donatello
Dam Little Hills (IRE) 1971	Candy Cane (GB); 1965	Crepello	Crepuscule
Dam Little Hills (IRE) 1971	Candy Cane (GB); 1965	Candy Gift	Princely Gift
Dam Little Hills (IRE) 1971	Candy Cane (GB); 1965	Candy Gift	Kandy Sauce
Dam Little Hills (IRE) 1971	Ballyogan Queen (GB); 1956	Ballyogan	Fair Trial
Dam Little Hills (IRE) 1971	Ballyogan Queen (GB); 1956	Ballyogan	Serial
Dam Little Hills (IRE) 1971	Ballyogan Queen (GB); 1956	Stone Crop	Kingstone
Dam Little Hills (IRE) 1971	Ballyogan Queen (GB); 1956	Stone Crop	Salvia (Family:1-l)
