= The Wonder (horse) =

French-bred Thoroughbred racehorse

- Sire: Wittgenstein
- Grandsire: Roi Dagobert
- Dam: The Lark
- Damsire: Lanark
- Sex: Stallion
- Foaled: 15 March 1978
- Country: France
- Colour: Brown
- Breeder: Alain du Breil
- Owner: Mme Alain du Breil; Marquese de Moratalla
- Trainer: Jacques de Chevigny; Charles Whittingham
- Record: 31: 12-6-2

Major wins
- Prix de Condé (1980); Critérium de Saint-Cloud (1980); Prix Greffulhe (1981); Prix d'Ispahan (1981); Prix Edmond Blanc (1982); Prix Jacques Le Marois (1982); San Bernardino Handicap (1983); Century Handicap (1983); Californian Stakes (1983)

Awards
- Timeform rating: 123 (1980), 129 (1981), 127 (1982)

The Wonder (foaled 1978) was a French-bred Thoroughbred racehorse and sire. The Wonder was one of the best horses of his generation in France at two, three and four years of age: his wins included the Prix de Condé, Critérium de Saint-Cloud, Prix Greffulhe, Prix d'Ispahan, Prix Edmond Blanc and Prix Jacques Le Marois. In 1983 he was transferred to the United States where he won the San Bernardino Handicap, Century Handicap and Californian Stakes. He was then retired to stud where he had moderate success as a sire of winners.

== Background ==
The Wonder was a "tall, lengthy" dark brown horse with no white markings bred in France by Alain du Breil, the president of the Societe de Steeple-Chases, the governing body of French jump racing. He was the only horse of any consequence sired by Wittgenstein, a Florida-bred stallion who won the Critérium de Maisons-Laffitte in 1973. The Wonder was the first foal of The Lark, the only Thoroughbred mare owned by du Breil. She later produced the Badener Sprint-Cup winner Areias. The Wonder originally raced in the colours of du Breil's wife and was trained by Jacques de Chevigny.

== Racing career ==
=== 1980: two-year-old season ===
After finishing fourth in a race over 1100 metres on his racecourse debut, The Wonder won a race over 1400m at Évry Racecourse and the Prix des Foals at Deauville Racecourse in August. The colt was then moved up in class and distance for the Group Three Prix Saint-Roman over 1800m at Longchamp Racecourse on 4 October. Ridden by Alain Lequeux he finished strongly to finish third of the eight runners, beaten a neck and a head by Mariacho and Arc d'Or. Two weeks later, The Wonder was moved up to 2000m for the Group Three Prix de Condé on soft ground at Longchamp. Ridden by Yves Saint-Martin he was in fifth place 150m from the finish but produced a strong late run on the inside to take the lead in the final strides and won by a neck from Ledmir. The Wonder ended his first season in the Critérium de Saint-Cloud (then a Group Two race) on 17 November in which he was ridden by Alfred Gibert. Starting the 2.2/1 second favourite he took the lead 300m from the finish and won by a length from Mont Pelion. In their annual Racehorses of 1980, the independent Timeform organisation described The Wonder as a "stayer", who would require "at least a mile and a quarter" to show his best form.

=== 1981: three-year-old season ===
On his three-year-old debut, The Wonder finished second to No Lute in the Prix Greffulhe over 2100m at Longchamp, but was awarded the race after the winner's post-race urine test showed traces of Nandrolone, an anabolic steroid. No Lute was cleared to run in the Prix Lupin on 17 May and beat The Wonder by three lengths. The Wonder moved up in distance to contest the Prix du Jockey Club over 2400m at Chantilly Racecourse on 7 June. Ridden by Lester Piggott he faded in the closing stages and finished tenth of the twelve runners behind Bikala.

On 4 July, The Wonder was matched against older horses for the first time in the Group One Prix d'Ispahan over 1900m at Longchamp. Ridden by Lequeux, he started a 13/1 outsider in a field which included the Poule d'Essai des Poulains winner Recitation, the Poule d'Essai des Pouliches winner Aryenne, the Prix Jean Prat winner Cresta Rider, the Prix du Jockey Club runner-up Akarad and the improving ex-Italian-trained Northjet. The Wonder produced an impressive performance to record his first success at the highest level, winning by two lengths from Northjet, with Cresta Rider three-quarters of a length away in third. The Wonder then contested France's two most important weight-for-age mile races, the Prix Jacques Le Marois at Deauville and the Prix du Moulin at Longchamp. In the former race, he finished fifth in an exceptionally strong field behind Northjet, To-Agori-Mou, Kings Lake and Hilal. In the latter race he finished third beaten one and a half lengths and a nose by Northjet and Hilal.

On his final appearance of the season The Wonder was sent to England to contest the Champion Stakes at Newmarket Racecourse on 17 October. Ridden by Gibert, he started at odds of 9/1 despite reports that he had been performing poorly in training. He finished sixth of the sixteen runners behind Vayrann, ahead of many good horses including Master Willie, Madam Gay and Kirtling.

=== 1982: four-year-old season ===
In 1982, The Wonder entered the ownership of the Marquese de Moratalla, who was best known as an owner of steeplechasers such as The Fellow. He began his season in March when he was an easy winner of the Group Three Prix Edmond Blanc over 1600m at Saint-Cloud against moderate opposition. He finished fourth in his next two races including the Lockinge Stakes in England and then finished second to Al Nasr in both the Prix Dollar and the Prix d'Ispahan. In July he again failed to reproduce his best form in Britain, finishing unplaced behind On The House in the Sussex Stakes at Goodwood Racecourse. On 15 August, The Wonder was ridden for the first time by the Irish jockey Pat Eddery in the Group One Prix Jacques Le Marois at Deauville. He started at odds of 6.2/1 in a field which included Green Forest, Zino, Melyno (Poule d'Essai des Poulains), Noalcoholic (Prix Messidor) and Exclusive Order (Prix Maurice de Gheest). Eddery held up the colt in the early stages before producing a strong run to take the lead in the last 200m and won by three-quarters of a length from Green Forest, with Zino a further three-quarters of a length back in third. In September, The Wonder finished second to Green Forest in the Prix du Moulin at Longchamp and on his final appearance he finished second to the Irish-trained three-year-old Pas de Seul in the 1400m Prix de la Forêt in October. In the latter race Eddery was criticised for making his challenge too early, and there was some speculation that he had mistakenly timed his run for the first winning post rather than the second.

In late 1982, The Wonder was being advertised as a breeding stallion for 1983, standing at the Haras de Clarbec, but a change of plan saw him sent to continue his racing career in the United States, where he was trained by Charles Whittingham.

=== 1983: five-year-old season ===
The Wonder was based at Santa Anita Park, in the early part of 1983, and opened his American career with a three and a half length win in an allowance race on 27 February. A week later he was moved up in class and carried top weight of 124 pounds the Grade I Santa Anita Handicap on dirt, but finished thirteenth behind Bates Motel. On 17 April The Wonder recorded his first major success in the United States when he won the nine furlong San Bernardino Handicap, beating Konewah and the Strub Stakes winner Swing Till Dawn. The horse then moved to Hollywood Park Racetrack and won the Grade I Century Handicap on Turf on 7 May, ridden by Bill Shoemaker. A month later at the same course, The Wonder contested the Grade I Californian Stakes. He was in last place, more than fifteen lengths behind the leaders in the early stages, but produced a strong late run to win by a nose from Prince Spellbound with Poley in third place. The Wonder's winning run came to an end when he finished seventh, as the 11-10 favourite, behind John Henry in the American Handicap on 4 July. The horse returned to form in August to finish second to Bates Motel in the San Diego Handicap, but then finished unplaced behind Tolomeo in the Budweiser Million later that month. On his final racecourse appearance he finished sixth behind Bel Bolide in the Carleton F. Burke Handicap at Santa Anita in October.

== Assessment ==
In 1980, the independent Timeform organisation gave The Wonder a rating of 123, eleven pounds below their top-rated two-year-old Storm Bird. In the official International Classification he was rated nine pounds behind Storm Bird. In 1981, Timeform gave the colt a peak annual rating of 129, eleven pounds below Shergar: he was rated the ninth-best European three-year-old in the International Classification. In 1982 he was rated 127 by Timeform and was rated the eighth-best older horse in Europe in the International Classification.

== Stud record ==
The Wonder stood as a breeding stallion in the United States and France with mixed result. The best of his flat race runners was A Magicman, a German-trained colt whose wins included the Prix de la Forêt, Prix de la Porte Maillot, Ostermann-Pokal, Oettingen-Rennen and Grosse Europa-Meile. The Wonder sired several winners over jumps including Wonder Man who won thirteen races including the Henry VIII Novices' Chase. His last recorded foal was born in 1999.

== Pedigree ==
Pedigree of The Wonder (FR), brown stallion, 1978
Sire Wittgenstein (USA) 1971	Roi Dagobert (FR); 1964	Sicambre	Prince Bio
Sire Wittgenstein (USA) 1971	Roi Dagobert (FR); 1964	Sicambre	Sif
Sire Wittgenstein (USA) 1971	Roi Dagobert (FR); 1964	Dame d'Atours	Cranach
Sire Wittgenstein (USA) 1971	Roi Dagobert (FR); 1964	Dame d'Atours	Barley Corn
Sire Wittgenstein (USA) 1971	Stavroula (USA); 1956	Nasrullah*	Nearco
Sire Wittgenstein (USA) 1971	Stavroula (USA); 1956	Nasrullah*	Mumtaz Begum
Sire Wittgenstein (USA) 1971	Stavroula (USA); 1956	Segula	Johnstown
Sire Wittgenstein (USA) 1971	Stavroula (USA); 1956	Segula	Sekhmet
Dam The Lark (FR) 1972	Lanark (GB); 1963	Grey Sovereign	Nasrullah*
Dam The Lark (FR) 1972	Lanark (GB); 1963	Grey Sovereign	Kong
Dam The Lark (FR) 1972	Lanark (GB); 1963	Vermilion O'Toole	The Phoenix
Dam The Lark (FR) 1972	Lanark (GB); 1963	Vermilion O'Toole	Gloriana
Dam The Lark (FR) 1972	Norman Lass (FR); 1968	Timmy Lad	Tim Tam
Dam The Lark (FR) 1972	Norman Lass (FR); 1968	Timmy Lad	Providence
Dam The Lark (FR) 1972	Norman Lass (FR); 1968	Golden Glory	Never Say Die*
Dam The Lark (FR) 1972	Norman Lass (FR); 1968	Golden Glory	Golden Twilight (Family: 2-n)

* The Wonder is inbred 3S x 4D x 5D to the stallion Nasrullah, meaning that he appears third generation on the sire side of his pedigree, and fourth generation and fifth generation (via Never Say Die) on the dam side of his pedigree.
