= Mrs Penny =

American-bred Thoroughbred racehorse

- Sire: Great Nephew
- Grandsire: Honeyway
- Dam: Tananarive
- Damsire: Le Fabuleux
- Sex: Mare
- Foaled: 22 March 1977
- Country: United States
- Colour: Chestnut
- Breeder: Marshall Jenney
- Owner: Eric Kronfeld
- Trainer: Ian Balding; Thomas J. Skiffington Jr.
- Record: 22: 6-5-2

Major wins
- Cherry Hinton Stakes (1979); Lowther Stakes (1979); Cheveley Park Stakes (1979); Prix de Diane (1980); Prix Vermeille (1980); Queen Charlotte Handicap (1981)

Awards
- Top-rated European two-year-old filly (1979); Top-rated British three-year-old filly (1980); Timeform rating 119 (1979), 127 (1980)

Mrs Penny (22 March 1977 – 1997) was an American-bred, British-trained Thoroughbred racehorse and broodmare. She won six of her twenty-two races and was rated the best British filly of her generation at both two and three years of age. In 1980 she won three of her six races including the Cherry Hinton Stakes, Lowther Stakes and Cheveley Park Stakes. In the following year she recorded her biggest wins in France where she won the Prix de Diane and the Prix Vermeille, but produced arguably her best performance in defeat when finishing second in the King George VI and Queen Elizabeth Stakes. In 1981 she was sent to race in the United States where she won the Queen Charlotte Handicap, but failed to reproduce her European form. She was then retired to stud, where she had some success as a broodmare.

== Background ==
Mrs Penny was a "lengthy" chestnut mare with a broad white blaze and a long white sock on her right hind leg bred by Marshall Jenney at the Derry Meeting Farm near Cochranville, Pennsylvania . She was sired by Great Nephew, a British stallion whose other progeny included Grundy and Shergar. Her dam Tananarive won in France when owned by her breeder Daniel Wildenstein and was exported to the United States when pregnant with the filly who would become Mrs Penny. Tananarive later produced Cadeaux d'Amie, the dam of the 1000 Guineas winner Hatoof.

As a yearling, Mr Penny was sent to the Saratoga sales and bought for $40,000 by the American lawyer Eric Kronfeld. She was sent to race in Europe where she was trained by Ian Balding at Kingsclere. Like many Balding-trained horses she usually raced in a sheepskin noseband.

== Racing career ==
=== 1979: two-year-old season ===
Mrs Penny finished second in her first two races over the minimum distance of five furlongs before being moved up in class and distance for the Cherry Hinton Stakes at Newmarket Racecourse in July. Ridden by John Matthias, she started at odds of 11/1, with the Queen Mary Stakes winner Abeer being made favourite. Mrs Penny started slowly and appeared to have little chance until the final furlong, but finished very strongly to overtake Abeer in the closing stages and win by three quarters of a length. Abeer had been conceding nine pounds to Mrs Penny at Newmarket, and when the fillies met again at a three-pound difference in the Lowther Stakes at York Racecourse in August she was widely expected to reverse the placings. Starting the 11/2 third choice in the betting, Mrs Penny took the lead two furlongs from the finish and won decisively by two lengths from Teacher's Pet, with Abeer in fourth place.

In September, Mrs Penny was matched against colts and started favourite for the Mill Reef Stakes at Newbury Racecourse. She led for most of the way but faded in the closing stages and finished fourth behind Lord Seymour, Taufan and Known Fact. Mrs Penny's final race of the season was the Cheveley Park Stakes, which was then the only British Group One race restricted to two-year-old fillies. She started at odds of 7/1, with La Legende being made favourite ahead of Luck of the Draw and the Irish-trained Monroe. Mr Penny took the lead two furlongs from the finish, and rallied after being headed by Millingdale Lillie to regain the advantage and win by a short head. At the end of the year the independent Timeform organization described her as an "admirably game" filly who would have no difficulties competing over longer distances.

=== 1980: three-year-old season ===
On her three-year-old debut, Mrs Penny ran in the Fred Darling Stakes, a trial race for the 1000 Guineas, over seven furlongs at Newbury Racecourse in April and finished second, half a length behind Millingdale Lillie with Quick As Lightning in third place. Two weeks later, on 1 May, Mrs Penny, started the 8/1 third favourite for the 168th running of the 1000 Guineas over the Rowley Mile course at Newmarket Racecourse. She took the lead with two furlongs left to run, but at least seven fillies were still in contention a furlong out, and in a driving finish Mr Penny finished third, beaten a neck and half a length by Quick As Lightning and Our Home. On 24 May, Mrs Penny started third favourite for the Irish 1,000 Guineas at the Curragh and finished third of the eighteen runners behind Cairn Rouge and Millingdale Lillie.

Lester Piggott took over from John Matthias as Mrs Penny's jockey when the filly was sent to France and moved up in distance to contest the Prix de Diane over 2100 metres at Chantilly Racecourse. She started at odds of 8.2/1 against twelve opponents which included the Poule d'Essai des Pouliches winner Aryenne and the Prix Saint-Alary winner Paranete. She took the lead in the straight and held off the sustained challenge of Aryenne to win by a short neck, becoming the first British-trained winner of the race since Highclere in 1974. Mrs Penny was then aimed at Britain's most prestigious all-aged race, the King George VI and Queen Elizabeth Stakes at Ascot Racecourse in July. Piggott settled the filly just behind the leaders and turned into the straight in third place before moving up to challenge the four-year-old colt Ela-Mana-Mou inside the final quarter mile. She briefly looked likely to win, but was outstayed by the older horse and finished second, beaten three quarters of a length, five lengths clear of the other runners. In the Benson and Hedges Gold Cup at York on 19 August, Mrs Penny was unable to obtain a clear run in the straight before finishing strongly to take fourth place behind Master Willie, Cairn Rouge and Cracaval.

As Piggott was serving a suspension, Matthias reclaimed the ride on Mrs Penny when the filly was sent to France in September for the Prix Vermeille over 2400m on soft ground at Longchamp Racecourse. The race attracted an exceptionally strong field including Detroit, Aryenne, Cairn Rouge, Gold River and Paranete. Starting at odds of 8.8/1 she took the lead in the straight and held off several challengers to win by half a length from the Irish-trained outsider Little Bonny with Detroit in third and Gold River fourth. On her final appearance of the season, Mrs Penny started at odds of 12/1 for the Prix de l'Arc de Triomphe on 5 October when she was again ridden by Matthias. Racing on firmer ground she held a good position on the turn into the straight but dropped back in the closing stages and finished fifteenth of the twenty runners behind Detroit. At the end of the year, Timform described her as "a very game, tough, consistent filly".

=== 1981: four-year-old season ===
Mrs Penny remained in training as a four-year-old in England, but failed to recover her best form, finishing fourth behind Master Willie in the Coronation Cup and unplaced behind Pelerin in the Hardwicke Stakes. She was then sent to race in the United States where he was trained by Thomas Skiffington. She ran six times, with her best efforts being a second place behind Match The Hatch in the Manhattan Handicap at Belmont Park in September and a win in the Grade III Queen Charlotte Handicap at Meadowlands Racetrack in October.

== Assessment ==
In 1979, Mrs Penny was given a rating of 119 by Timeform, making her the second-best two-year-old filly of the year behind the French-trained Aryenne. In the official International Classification she was rated a pound ahead of Aryenne and level with Princess Lida as the best two-year-old filly in Europe. In 1980, Mrs Penny was given a rating of 127 by Timeform organisation, equal with Bireme and Shoot A Line and four pounds below the top-rated three-year-old filly Detroit. In the International Classification she was rated two pounds below Detroit and level with Shoot A Line.

== Stud record ==
Mrs Penny was retired from racing to become a broodmare in the United States for Kronfeld's Maverick Productions and died in 1997. She produced at least nine foals and six winner between 1984 and 1996:

- Tale of Intrigue (bay filly, foaled in 1984, sired by Alleged), failed to win in six races
- Pennsylvania (chestnut filly, 1985, by Northjet), failed to win in two races
- Mrs Jenney (chestnut filly, 1986, by The Minstrel), won two races in England and two races in the United States, dam of the Whitney Stakes winner Unaccounted For
- Northern Park (bay colt, 1988, by Northern Dancer), won one race
- Pennys Valentine (chestnut filly, 1989, by Storm Cat), won one race in France and one in the United States, dam of the Prix Quincey winner Penny's Gold
- Pencombe (bay colt, 1990, by Nureyev), won one race in France and one race in Dubai
- Fort Knox (chestnut colt, 1993, by Miswaki), won two races in the United States
- Woods Landing (colt, 1995, by Woodman), won four races in the United States
- Hand Crafted (colt, 1996, by Woodman), failed to win in two races

== Breeding ==
Pedigree of Mrs Penny (USA), chestnut mare, 1977
Sire Great Nephew (GB) 1963	Honeyway (GB); 1941	Fairway	Phalaris
Sire Great Nephew (GB) 1963	Honeyway (GB); 1941	Fairway	Scapa Flow
Sire Great Nephew (GB) 1963	Honeyway (GB); 1941	Honey Buzzard	Papyrus
Sire Great Nephew (GB) 1963	Honeyway (GB); 1941	Honey Buzzard	Lady Peregrine
Sire Great Nephew (GB) 1963	Sybil's Niece (GB); 1951	Admiral's Walk	Hyperion
Sire Great Nephew (GB) 1963	Sybil's Niece (GB); 1951	Admiral's Walk	Tabaris
Sire Great Nephew (GB) 1963	Sybil's Niece (GB); 1951	Sybil's Sister	Nearco
Sire Great Nephew (GB) 1963	Sybil's Niece (GB); 1951	Sybil's Sister	Sister Sarah
Dam Tananarive (GB) 1970	Le Fabuleux (FR); 1961	Wild Risk	Rialto
Dam Tananarive (GB) 1970	Le Fabuleux (FR); 1961	Wild Risk	Wild Violet
Dam Tananarive (GB) 1970	Le Fabuleux (FR); 1961	Anguar	Verso
Dam Tananarive (GB) 1970	Le Fabuleux (FR); 1961	Anguar	La Rochelle
Dam Tananarive (GB) 1970	Ten Double (USA); 1961	Decathlon	Olympia
Dam Tananarive (GB) 1970	Ten Double (USA); 1961	Decathlon	Dog Blessed
Dam Tananarive (GB) 1970	Ten Double (USA); 1961	Roodles	Princequillo
Dam Tananarive (GB) 1970	Ten Double (USA); 1961	Roodles	Ace Card (Family 25)
