= Beldale Flutter =

American-bred Thoroughbred racehorse

- Sire: Accipiter
- Grandsire: Damascus
- Dam: Flitter Flutter
- Damsire: Cohoe
- Sex: Stallion
- Foaled: 4 April 1978
- Country: United States
- Colour: Bay
- Breeder: Warner L. Jones Jr.
- Owner: A J Kelly
- Trainer: Michael Jarvis
- Record: 11:5-0-1

Major wins
- Critérium International d'Ostende (1980); William Hill Futurity (1980); Dante Stakes (1981); Benson and Hedges Gold Cup (1981)

Awards
- Timeform rating: 127 (1980), 130 (1981)

Beldale Flutter (foaled 4 April 1978) was an American-bred, British-trained Thoroughbred racehorse and sire. As a two-year-old in 1980 he was rated one of the best horses of his generation after winning three of his five races, most notably a decisive victory over Shergar in the William Hill Futurity. As a three-year-old he won the Dante Stakes and was second favourite for The Derby before sustaining a serious injury in training which kept him off the racecourse for three months. He returned in August to win the Benson and Hedges Gold Cup against older horses. He ran poorly in his two remaining races and was retired to stud, where he had limited success as a sire.

== Background ==
Beldale Flutter was a dark-coated bay horse with a narrow white stripe bred in Kentucky by Warner L. Jones Jr. He was sired by the American stallion Accipiter, whose biggest win came in the 1974 Withers Stakes. His dam, Flitter Flutter had previously produced several winners, including Our Jimmy, a successful two-year-old in Britain 1976.

The colt was sold three times before appearing on the racecourse. He was sold for $32,000 as a foal and $20,000 as a yearling. In March 1980 he was offered for sale again and was bought for $20,000 by Joss Collins of the British Bloodstock Agency. He entered into the ownership of Tony Kelly and was sent to Europe to be trained by Michael Jarvis at his Pegasus House table in Newmarket, Suffolk.

== Racing career ==
=== 1980: two-year-old season ===
After finishing fourth over six furlongs on his debut, he recorded his first success in a minor race over seven furlongs at Haydock Park Racecourse in August, beating Baz Bombati by half a length. He was sent to Belgium where he won the Critérium International d'Ostende at Hippodrome Wellington. In September he was moved up in class to contest the Group Two Royal Lodge Stakes over one mile at Ascot Racecourse. He took the lead in the straight but was overtaken in the final furlong and finished fourth behind Robellino, Recitation and Gielgud. In October, Beldale Flutter started a 14/1 outsider in a field of seven runners for the Group One William Hill Futurity over one mile at Doncaster Racecourse. Robellino started favourite ahead of Recitation, who had won the Grand Critérium in France, while the other fancied runners included Shergar, who had won his only previous start. Ridden by Pat Eddery, Beldale Flutter tracked the leader Sheer Grit before moving into the lead two furlong from the finish. He stayed on strongly in the closing stages and won by two lengths from Shergar, with Sheer Grit two and a half lengths back in third.

=== 1981: three-year-old season ===
Beldale Flutter began his three-year-old season in the Greenham Stakes, a trial race for the 2000 Guineas, run over seven furlongs at Newbury Racecourse in April. He appeared to be less than fully fit and finished third behind Another Realm and Age Quod Agis. In the 2000 Guineas at Newmarket Racecourse on 2 May, he started the 10/1 fourth choice in the betting but was never in contention and finished fifteenth of the nineteen runners behind To-Agori-Mou. Beldale Flutter was then moved up in distance for the Dante Stakes over ten and half furlongs at York Racecourse in which he started at odds of 11/1. Ridden again by Eddery, he settled behind the leaders in a slowly run race before accelerating into the lead approaching the final furlong. He won "with plenty in hand" by three-quarters of a length from Shotgun, with Scintillating Air third and the favourite Kalaglow unplaced. Following his win at York, and reports of excellent performances in training, Beldale Flutter was promoted to second favourite for the Epsom Derby and was regarded as the only horse capable of challenging Shergar, who had been hugely impressive when recording wide-margin victories in the Sandown Classic Trial and the Chester Vase. A week before the Derby, Beldale Flutter threw his work rider and broke loose during training on the Long Hill gallop on Newmarket Heath. He collided with the champion sprinter Moorestyle before falling heavily on a road, sustaining serious injuries to his knee and ribs. His injuries kept him confined to his box for three weeks and ruled him out of the Derby. Jarvis later admitted that Beldale Flutter was unlikely to have beaten Shergar in the Derby, but said that, "it would still have been nice to finish second".

After a break of three months, Beldale Flutter returned in the Benson and Hedges Gold Cup at York, in which he was matched against older horses for the first time. He started at odds of 9/1 in a field of nine runners, with the four-year-old Master Willie being made the 5/2 favourite. Lester Piggott set a steady pace on Kirtling, with Eddery settling Beldale Flutter in second. Beldale Flutter quickened into the lead a furlong from the finish and won by three-quarters of a length from Kirtling, with Master Willie another three-quarters of a length away in third. Beldale Flutter did not run again until October when he started at odds of 12/1 for the Prix de l'Arc de Triomphe at Longchamp Racecourse. He never threatened to get into contention and eventually finished twenty-third of the twenty-four runners behind Gold River. For his final race, Beldale Flutter was sent to the United States for the Washington, D.C. International Stakes at Laurel Park. He appeared unsuited by the firm ground and finished seventh of the ten runners behind Providential.

== Assessment ==
In the official International Classification for 1980, Beldale Flutter was give a rating of 82, making him the sixth-best two-year-old colt in Europe, seven pounds below the top-rated Storm Bird. The independent Timeform organisation concurred, giving him a rating of 127 to Storm Bird's 134. In the following year he was given a peak annual Timeform rating of 130. In the International Classification he was rated the equal-fourth-best three-year-old colt in Europe behind Shergar, Bikala and Cut Above.

== Stud career ==
At the end of his racing career, Beldale Flutter was syndicated at £60,000 a share, and became a breeding stallion at the Banstead Manor Stud in Newmarket. In 1984 he was offered for sale again and was bought for only $11,000 by the British-based trainer Luca Cumani. He later stood as a stallion in Switzerland. The last of his recorded foals were born in 1999.

The best of his offspring was probably Halkopous, who won thirteen races on the flat and over hurdles and finished third in the Champion Hurdle. Other winners included Just A Flutter (Premio Vittorio di Capua) and Beldale Star (Blue Riband Trial Stakes). He was the damsire of Crystal Music.

== Pedigree ==
Pedigree of Beldale Flutter (USA), bay stallion, 1978
Sire Accipiter (USA) 1971	Damascus (USA); 1964	Sword Dancer	Sunglow
Sire Accipiter (USA) 1971	Damascus (USA); 1964	Sword Dancer	Highland Fling
Sire Accipiter (USA) 1971	Damascus (USA); 1964	Kerala	My Babu
Sire Accipiter (USA) 1971	Damascus (USA); 1964	Kerala	Blade of Time
Sire Accipiter (USA) 1971	Kingsland (USA); 1965	Bold Ruler	Nasrullah
Sire Accipiter (USA) 1971	Kingsland (USA); 1965	Bold Ruler	Miss Disco
Sire Accipiter (USA) 1971	Kingsland (USA); 1965	Landmark	Revoked
Sire Accipiter (USA) 1971	Kingsland (USA); 1965	Landmark	Oasis
Dam Flitter Flutter (USA) 1966	Cohoes (USA); 1954	Mahmoud	Blenheim
Dam Flitter Flutter (USA) 1966	Cohoes (USA); 1954	Mahmoud	Mah Mahal
Dam Flitter Flutter (USA) 1966	Cohoes (USA); 1954	Belle of Troy	Blue Larkspur
Dam Flitter Flutter (USA) 1966	Cohoes (USA); 1954	Belle of Troy	La Troienne
Dam Flitter Flutter (USA) 1966	Ellerslie (USA); 1954	Nasrullah	Nearco
Dam Flitter Flutter (USA) 1966	Ellerslie (USA); 1954	Nasrullah	Mumtaz Begum
Dam Flitter Flutter (USA) 1966	Ellerslie (USA); 1954	Effie B	Bull Dog
Dam Flitter Flutter (USA) 1966	Ellerslie (USA); 1954	Effie B	Misleading (Family 1-a)

- Beldale Flutter was inbred 3 x 4 to Nasrullah, meaning that this stallion appears in both the third and fourth generation of his pedigree.
