= Vayrann =

Irish-bred Thoroughbred racehorse

- Sire: Brigadier Gerard
- Grandsire: Queen's Hussar
- Dam: Val Divine
- Damsire: Val de Loir
- Sex: Stallion
- Foaled: 7 April 1978
- Country: Ireland
- Colour: Brown
- Breeder: Aga Khan IV
- Owner: Aga Khan IV
- Trainer: François Mathet
- Record: 8: 4-1-1

Major wins
- Prix Jean de Chaudenay (1981); Prix du Prince d'Orange (1981); Champion Stakes (1981)

Awards
- Timeform rating: 133 (1981), 123 (1982)

Vayrann (foaled 7 April 1978) was an Irish-bred, French-trained Thoroughbred racehorse and sire. As a three-year-old in 1981 he won four of his six races including the Prix Jean de Chaudenay, Prix du Prince d'Orange and Champion Stakes. His victory in the latter race was only confirmed at the end of a protracted and controversial process after he failed a post-race drug test. He was injured on his second appearance in 1982 and was retired to stud, where he had moderate success as a sire of winners.

== Background ==
Vayrann was a brown horse with a large white star and a white coronet on his left hind foot officially bred by his owner Aga Khan IV in Ireland. He was one of the best horses sired by Brigadier Gerard who won seventeen of his eighteen races between 1970 and 1972 and is rated the second-best British-trained racehorse since 1947 (after Frankel) by the independent Timeform organisation. Vayrann's dam Val Divine (bred by François Dupré) was a moderate racehorse but a very good broodmare who produced the Queen Anne Stakes winner Valiyar and the Oak Tree Invitational Stakes winner Yashgan as well as the dams of Natroun (Prix du Jockey Club) and Vereva (Prix de Diane). The Aga Khan bought Val Divine at the dispersal of Dupre's bloodstock: at the time she was carrying the unborn foal who would later be named Vayrann.

Vayrann was trained by the veteran François Mathet at Chantilly. Mathet had trained many of the best French racehorses of the 20th century including Tantieme, Relko and Reliance.

== Racing career ==
=== 1981: three-year-old season ===
Vayrann began his racing career in the Prix Ajax, a maiden race over 2000 metres at Saint-Cloud Racecourse and won by five lengths. He then finished second to his stable companion Akarad in the Prix de l'Avre over 2400m at Longchamp Racecourse in May. He was the matched against older horses in the Prix Jean de Chaudenay at Saint Cloud in which he was matched against Argument, a colt who had won the 1980 Washington, D.C. International Stakes. Vayrann won decisively by three lengths from Kelbomec with Argument in third place. On his next appearance the colt was moved up in distance to contest the Grand Prix de Paris over 3000m at Longchamp on 4 July. He started the 6/4 favourite but finished third of the eleven runner behind the British colt Glint of Gold and the out-and-out stayer Tipperary Fixer.

After a two-month break, Vayrann returned in the Prix du Prince d'Orange over 2000m at Longchamp in September in which he was matched against the Prix du Jockey Club winner Bikala. The race attracted a great deal of attention as it also saw the reappearance of Storm Bird, the leading European two-year-old of 1980, who had been off the course for eleven months. Vayrann produced a strong finish to overtake Bikala inside the final furlong and won by half a length, with Storm Bird unplaced. Vayrann was then sent to England to contest the Champion Stakes over ten furlongs at Newmarket Racecourse. Ridden by Yves Saint-Martin he started the 15/2 second favourite behind the 2000 Guineas winner To-Agori-Mou in a field which also included the Irish filly Cairn Rouge who had won the race in 1981 as well as Master Willie, Madam Gay and The Wonder. Vayrann was always among the leaders, took the lead inside the final quarter mile and never looked in danger of defeat, winning by two lengths from Cairn Rouge, with the 66/1 outsider Amyndas two length further back in third. A post-race urine sample gave a positive result but the result of the race was left unaltered pending a Jockey Club inquiry held in the following year.

=== 1982: four-year-old season ===
On his four-year-old debut, Vayrann contested the Group One Prix Ganay over 2100m at Longchamp on 2 May. He looked less than fully fit and ran well to finish fourth behind Bikala, Lancastrian and Al Nasr with Kalaglow and April Run unplaced. Two months later in the Grand Prix de Saint-Cloud, Vayrann started third favourite at odds of 7/2. He finished fifth behind Glint of Gold, sustaining a serious injury to his right foreleg which ended his racing career.

The inquiry into Vayrann's positive test took place at a private session of the Jockey Club's disciplinary committee on 7 June 1982. The horse's urine sample had been found to contain Estrane-3.17 Diol a substance produced by the breakdown of anabolic steroids. The use of steroids is banned in British racing (although at the time they were allowed to be used as a medication for horses who were out of training) and it was widely expected that Vayrann would be disqualified. The Aga Khan's team of experts argued that it was possible for a male horse to produce Estrane naturally as a breakdown product from testosterone, and that the Jockey Club's list of prohibited substances only covered those which were administered externally. The committee accepted these arguments and allowed Vayrann to keep the race.

== Assessment ==
In 1981 the independent Timeform organisation gave Vayrann a rating of 133, making him the fourth best horse of the year behind Shergar (140), Northjet (136) and Bikala (134). In the official International Classification he was less highly rated, being placed twelve pound behind the top-rated Shergar and equal-eleventh among all European-trained horses. In the following year he was rated 123 by Timeform.

== Stud record ==
Vayrann was retired from racing to become a breeding stallion at his owner's Haras de Bonneval in Normandy. He was not a particularly successful stallion, but did sire the Grand Prix de Vichy winner Altashar as well as several Listed race winners. He also sired Vayrua, who finished third in Chester Vase before becoming a top-class National Hunt horse, whose wins included the Anniversary Hurdle at Aintree Racecourse in 1989. He was also the broodmare sire of the Prix de Diane winner Daryaba.

== Pedigree ==
Pedigree of Vayrann (IRE), brown stallion, 1978
| Sire Brigadier Gerard (GB) 1968 | Queen's Hussar (GB); 1960 | March Past | Petition |
| Sire Brigadier Gerard (GB) 1968 | Queen's Hussar (GB); 1960 | March Past | Marcelette |
| Sire Brigadier Gerard (GB) 1968 | Queen's Hussar (GB); 1960 | Jojo | Vilmorin |
| Sire Brigadier Gerard (GB) 1968 | Queen's Hussar (GB); 1960 | Jojo | Fairy Jane |
| Sire Brigadier Gerard (GB) 1968 | La Paiva (GB); 1956 | Prince Chevalier | Prince Rose |
| Sire Brigadier Gerard (GB) 1968 | La Paiva (GB); 1956 | Prince Chevalier | Chevalerie |
| Sire Brigadier Gerard (GB) 1968 | La Paiva (GB); 1956 | Brazen Molly | Horus |
| Sire Brigadier Gerard (GB) 1968 | La Paiva (GB); 1956 | Brazen Molly | Molly Adare |
| Dam Val Divine (FR) 1971 | Val de Loir (FR); 1959 | Vieux Manoir | Brantôme |
| Dam Val Divine (FR) 1971 | Val de Loir (FR); 1959 | Vieux Manoir | Vieille Maison |
| Dam Val Divine (FR) 1971 | Val de Loir (FR); 1959 | Vali | Sunny Boy |
| Dam Val Divine (FR) 1971 | Val de Loir (FR); 1959 | Vali | Her Slipper |
| Dam Val Divine (FR) 1971 | Pola Bella (FR); 1965 | Darius | Dante |
| Dam Val Divine (FR) 1971 | Pola Bella (FR); 1965 | Darius | Yasna |
| Dam Val Divine (FR) 1971 | Pola Bella (FR); 1965 | Bella Paola | Ticino |
| Dam Val Divine (FR) 1971 | Pola Bella (FR); 1965 | Bella Paola | Rhea (Family:4-n) |
