= Kings Lake (horse) =

American-bred, Irish-trained Thoroughbred racehorse

- Sire: Nijinsky
- Grandsire: Northern Dancer
- Dam: Fish Bar
- Damsire: Baldric
- Sex: Stallion
- Foaled: 12 May 1978
- Country: United States
- Colour: Bay
- Breeder: Lyonstown Stud
- Owner: Mme Jean-Pierre Binet
- Trainer: Vincent O'Brien
- Record: 10:8-3-3

Major wins
- Irish 2,000 Guineas (1981); Sussex Stakes (1981); Joe McGrath Memorial Stakes (1981)

Awards
- Timeform rating: 100p (1980), 133 (1981)

Kings Lake (14 May 1978 – 24 November 1999) was an American bred, Irish-trained Thoroughbred racehorse and sire. Despite not contesting any major races, he was rated one of the best two-year-old colts in Ireland in 1980 when he won two of his three starts. His three-year-old season was dominated by a rivalry with the British-trained colt To-Agori-Mou: Kings Lake won two of their four meetings, including the Irish 2,000 Guineas and the Sussex Stakes. Later that season he moved up in distance to win the Joe McGrath Memorial Stakes. He was retired to stud at the end of the season and had moderate success as a sire.

== Background ==
Kings Lake was a "neat, very attractive" bay horse with a small white star bred in Kentucky by the Irish-based Lyonstown Stud. He was sired by Nijinsky, the Canadian-bred winner of the English Triple Crown in 1970 who went on to become an important stallion, siring horses such as Ferdinand, Lammtarra, Sky Classic and Shahrastani. His dam Fish Bar had produced several other winners including Cloonlara a filly who won the Phoenix Stakes in 1976. Fish Bar was a granddaughter of the 1000 Guineas and St Leger Stakes winner Herringbone, whose other descendants included Moon Madness, Celtic Swing and Michelozzo. Kings Lake raced in the colours of Mme J. P. Binet and was trained by Vincent O'Brien at Ballydoyle, County Tipperary. He was ridden in his major races by the Irish jockey Pat Eddery.

== Racing career ==
=== 1980: two-year-old season ===
After finishing second on his debut, Kings Lake contested a fourteen-runner maiden race over six furlongs at the Curragh and won by four lengths from Noble Monk. In October he was moved up in distance for a minor race over seven furlongs at Naas Racecourse. He started the 4/9 favourite against ten opponents and won by half a length from Tellurano.

=== 1981: three-year-old season ===
On his three-year-old debut, Kings Lake was tried over ten furlongs in the Ballymoss Stakes at the Curragh in April and finished third behind Erin's Isle and Magesterial. He was then brought back in distance for the Irish 2000 Guineas over one mile at the Curragh on 16 May. Ridden by Eddery, he started the 5/1 second favourite behind the English 2000 Guineas winner To-Agori-Mou in what proved to be the most controversial race of the season. Eddery tracked the leaders before sending Kings Lake into the lead two furlongs from the finish and was almost immediately challenged on the outside by Greville Starkey on To-Agori-Mou. The two colts raced together throughout the closing stages, and made contact with each other several times before Kings Lake crossed the line a neck in front. The local racecourse stewards immediately called an inquiry, ruled that Kings Lake had interfered with his opponent and awarded the race to To-Agori-Mou. Kings Lake's connections refused to accept the result and appealed to the Turf Club, the ruling body of horseracing in Ireland. After a six-hour hearing the Turf Club overturned the decision of the local stewards and re-instated Kings Lake as the winner of the race. While most of the press were of the opinion that the final decision was unjust, some independent observers, including Timeform, supported the Turf Club, pointing out that Starkey was at least as culpable as Eddery for the bumping which occurred and that King Lake had appeared to win on merit.

The much-anticipated rematch between King Lake and To-Agori-Mou took place in the St James's Palace Stakes at Royal Ascot in June. On this occasion, To-Agori-Mou took the lead early in the straight with Kings Lake moving up to challenge on the outside. After a "thrilling battle" Kings Lake finished second by a neck to To-Agori-Mou, six lengths clear of Bel Bolide in third place. On 29 July, Kings Lake and To-Agori-Mou met for the third time in the Group One Sussex Stakes over one mile at Goodwood Racecourse. Kings Lake started the 5/2 second favourite in a field which also included the leading older horses Belmont Bay (Lockinge Stakes, Queen Anne Stakes), Dalsaan and In Fijar (Poule d'Essai des Poulains). With two furlongs left to run Kings Lake seemed hopelessly boxed in but Eddery shouted to Brian Rouse on Last Fandango, who obligingly moved his horse out of Kings Lake's way. Kings Lake accelerated through the resulting gap on the inside and caught To-Agori-Mou in the final strides to win by a neck. The fourth and final meeting between Kings Lake and To-Agori-Mou came in the Prix Jacques Le Marois at Deauville Racecourse on 16 August. Kings Lake was beaten a nose by his rival, but neither colt was able to compete with the French-trained four-year-old Northjet, who won easily by five lengths.

On 19 September, Kings Lake was moved up in distance for the Joe McGrath Memorial Stakes over ten furlongs at Leopardstown Racecourse, which at that time was the only Group One race open to older horses in Ireland. He started the 9/4 second favourite behind The Oaks winner Blue Wind, with the other runners including Arctique Royale (Irish 1,000 Guineas), Erin's Isle and Kind of Hush. Eddery had trouble obtaining a clear run on the turn into the straight, but Kings Lake accelerated clear of the field in the final furlong and held the late challenge of Erin's Isle to win by a length. On his final racecourse appearance, Kings Lake was sent to France to contest the Prix de l'Arc de Triomphe over 2400 metres at Longchamp Racecourse on 4 October. Coupled in the betting with the 1980 winner Detroit he started the 7/2 second favourite, but was never in contention and finished eleventh of the twenty-four runners behind Gold River. His retirement was announced five days later.

== Assessment ==
As a two-year-old, Kings Lake was given a rating of 100p by the independent Timeform organisation, the "p" indicating that he was likely to make more than normal improvement. In the Irish Free Handicap, he was given a weight of 120 pounds making him the fourth-best two-year-old in Ireland, thirteen pounds below his stable companion Storm Bird. In the following season he was rated 133 by Timeform, while in the International Classification he was rated the equal-fourth-best three-year-old colt in Europe behind Shergar, Bikala and Cut Above. He was the highest-rated horse of any age trained in Ireland in 1981. Timeform described him as "an extremely genuine and courageous performer who raced with tremendous zest".

== Stud career ==
Kings Lake was retired from racing to become a breeding stallion for the Coolmore Stud, with a syndication value of $22 million. He stood at a fee of A$40,000 at Mornmoot stud at Whittlesea, Victoria in 1988 and later moved to Germany. Kings Lake sired many winners, but few who made any mark in the highest class. His best winners included Yellow King (Gran Premio d'Italia), Tyrone Bridge (Challow Novices' Hurdle), Gaasid (Kennel Gate Novices' Hurdle), Wedding Bouquet (C. L. Weld Park Stakes) and Lake Erie (St Simon Stakes).

== Pedigree ==
Pedigree of Kings Lake (USA), bay stallion, 1978
Sire Nijinsky (CAN) 1967	Northern Dancer (CAN); 1961	Nearctic	Nearco
Sire Nijinsky (CAN) 1967	Northern Dancer (CAN); 1961	Nearctic	Lady Angela
Sire Nijinsky (CAN) 1967	Northern Dancer (CAN); 1961	Natalma	Native Dancer
Sire Nijinsky (CAN) 1967	Northern Dancer (CAN); 1961	Natalma	Almahmoud
Sire Nijinsky (CAN) 1967	Flaming Page (CAN); 1959	Bull Page	Bull Lea
Sire Nijinsky (CAN) 1967	Flaming Page (CAN); 1959	Bull Page	Our Page
Sire Nijinsky (CAN) 1967	Flaming Page (CAN); 1959	Flaring Top	Menow
Sire Nijinsky (CAN) 1967	Flaming Page (CAN); 1959	Flaring Top	Flaming Top
Dam Fish Bar (IRE) 1967	Baldric (USA); 1961	Round Table	Princequillo
Dam Fish Bar (IRE) 1967	Baldric (USA); 1961	Round Table	Knight's Daughter
Dam Fish Bar (IRE) 1967	Baldric (USA); 1961	Two Cities	Johnstown
Dam Fish Bar (IRE) 1967	Baldric (USA); 1961	Two Cities	Vienna
Dam Fish Bar (IRE) 1967	Fisherman's Wharf (IRE); 1959	Alycidon	Donatello
Dam Fish Bar (IRE) 1967	Fisherman's Wharf (IRE); 1959	Alycidon	Aurora
Dam Fish Bar (IRE) 1967	Fisherman's Wharf (IRE); 1959	Herringbone	King Salmon
Dam Fish Bar (IRE) 1967	Fisherman's Wharf (IRE); 1959	Herringbone	Schiaparelli (Family:8-c)
