= Quick As Lightning =

American-bred Thoroughbred racehorse

- Sire: Buckpasser
- Grandsire: Tom Fool
- Dam: Clear Ceiling
- Damsire: Bold Ruler
- Sex: Filly
- Foaled: 17 March 1977
- Country: United States
- Colour: Bay
- Breeder: Ogden Mills Phipps
- Owner: Ogden Mills Phipps
- Trainer: John Dunlop; Angel Penna, Sr.
- Record: 9: 3-2-3

Major wins
- Hoover Fillies' Mile (1979); 1000 Guineas (1980)

Awards
- Timeform rating 115 (1979), 123 (1980)

Quick As Lightning (17 March 1977 – 1981) was an American-bred, British-trained Thoroughbred racehorse best known for winning the classic 1000 Guineas in 1980. She was one of the leading British-trained juvenile fillies of 1979, when she won two of her three races including the Hoover Fillies' Mile. In the following year, she finished third on her debut before defeating twenty-two opponents in the 1000 Guineas. She never won again, although she finished fourth when favourite for The Oaks and was narrowly beaten in the Coronation Stakes. She was later transferred to the United States, where she failed to win in three races before dying in 1981 at the age of four.

== Background ==
Quick As Lightning was an "attractive, well-made" bay filly with no white markings, bred in Kentucky by her owner, Ogden Mills Phipps. She was from one of the last crops of foals sired by Ogden Phipps' stallion Buckpasser, an outstanding racehorse who was voted American Horse of the Year in 1966. He became a successful breeding stallion, siring La Prevoyante, Relaxing, Numbered Account, and L'Enjoleur. Quick As Lightning's dam, Clear Ceiling, won five races and was a half-sister to several good winners including Misty Morn, Bold Queen (Black-Eyed Susan Stakes), and What A Pleasure (Hopeful Stakes, twice Leading sire in North America). Phipps sent the filly to race in Europe, where she was trained by John Dunlop at Arundel, West Sussex.

== Racing career ==
=== 1979: two-year-old season ===
Quick As Lightning began her racing career in a twenty-four runner maiden race over six furlongs at Newmarket Racecourse in July. She accelerated well in the closing stages to win from Live Ammo and Moorestyle. The filly was then moved up in class to contest the Group Three Waterford Candelabra Stakes, which was run that year at Ascot Racecourse. She started favourite but appeared outpaced in the closing stages and finished third to Schweppes Forever and Vielle, beaten a total of five lengths. In September, Quick As Lighting started at odds of 9/1 for the Hoover Fillies' Mile (then a Group Three race) at the same course. Carson held the filly up at the back of the field as Appleby Park set a fast pace. In the straight, she made rapid progress but was still three lengths behind Vielle with a furlong to run. Quick As Lightning caught Vielle in the final strides to win by a neck, with Sharp Castan five lengths back in third place. In their annual Racehorses of 1979, the independent Timeform organisation commented that there were "good races to be won" with the filly over middle distances but expressed doubts about whether she had the speed to win the 1000 Guineas.

=== 1980: three-year-old season ===
On her three-year-old debut, Quick As Lightning ran in the Fred Darling Stakes, a trial race for the 1000 Guineas, over seven furlongs at Newbury Racecourse in April and finished third behind Millingdale Lillie and the Cheveley Park Stakes winner Mrs Penny. Two weeks later, Quick As Lightning started at odds of 12/1 in the 168th running of the 1000 Guineas over the Rowley Mile course at Newmarket Racecourse. She was ridden by Brian Rouse, who was a late reserve after four better-known jockeys reportedly turned down the chance to ride the filly. The highly regarded but lightly raced Saison started the 4/1 favourite ahead of the Nell Gwyn Stakes winner, Evita, on 15/2 with Millingdale Lillie, Mrs Penny, and Our Home at 8/1 in a field of twenty-three fillies. Rouse settled Quick As Lightning near the back of the field before moving up to challenge the leaders in the last quarter mile. At least seven horses were still in contention a furlong from the finish, as Our Home took a narrow lead from Mrs Penny. Quick As Lightning produced a sustained run on the outside to take the lead a hundred yards out and won by a neck and half a length from Our Home and Mrs Penny.

On 7 June, Quick As Lightning was moved up in distance and started the 3/1 favourite for the 202nd running of the Oaks Stakes over 1 1/2 miles at Epsom Downs Racecourse. Rouse again restrained the filly until the last quarter mile before switching to the outside, but the favourite was unable to make significant progress and finished fourth of the eleven runners behind Bireme, Vielle, and The Dancer, beaten a total of eight lengths. Quick As Lightning was brought back in distance and equipped with blinkers for her next race, the Group Two Coronation Stakes over one mile at Royal Ascot. She produced an improved effort, but was beaten a neck by the Irish 1000 Guineas winner Cairn Rouge, with Our Home in third place. Quick As Lightning was then moved up again to 1 1/2 miles for the Irish Oaks at the Curragh Racecourse but appeared unable to stay the distance as she dropped away in the last quarter mile to finish fifth of the nine runners behind Shoot A Line.

In the autumn of 1980, Quick As Lightning was sent to race in the United States, where she was trained by Angel Penna, Sr. On 22 December, she made her North American debut by finishing second in an allowance race over 8 1/2 furlongs at Calder Race Course in Florida.

=== 1981: four-year-old season ===
On 1 January 1981, Quick As Lightning finished third in a division of the Grade II La Prevoyante Handicap at Calder. On 27 January, she ended her racing career by finishing fourth in an allowance race at Gulfstream Park. Retired to become a broodmare, Quick As Lighting died in April 1981 of haemorrhage shortly before breeding.

== Assessment ==
In 1979, Quick As Lightning was given a rating of 115 by Timeform, five pounds behind their top-rated two-year-old filly, Aryenne. In the following year, Timeform rated her on 123, eight pounds below the highest-rated three-year-old filly, Detroit. In the official International Classification, she was also eight pounds below Detroit and was rated the sixth-best three-year-old filly trained in Britain behind Mrs Penny, Shoot A Line, Bireme, Vielle, and The Dancer.

In their book A Century of Champions, based on the Timeform rating system, John Randall and Tony Morris rated Quick As Lightning an "average" winner of the 1000 Guineas.

== Pedigree ==
Pedigree of Quick As Lightning (USA), bay mare, 1977
Sire Buckpasser (USA) 1963	Tom Fool (USA); 1949	Menow	Pharamond
Sire Buckpasser (USA) 1963	Tom Fool (USA); 1949	Menow	Alcibiades
Sire Buckpasser (USA) 1963	Tom Fool (USA); 1949	Gaga	Bull Dog
Sire Buckpasser (USA) 1963	Tom Fool (USA); 1949	Gaga	Alpoise
Sire Buckpasser (USA) 1963	Busanda (USA); 1947	War Admiral	Man o'War
Sire Buckpasser (USA) 1963	Busanda (USA); 1947	War Admiral	Brushup
Sire Buckpasser (USA) 1963	Busanda (USA); 1947	Businesslike	Blue Larkspur
Sire Buckpasser (USA) 1963	Busanda (USA); 1947	Businesslike	La Troienne
Dam Clear Ceiling (USA) 1968	Bold Ruler (USA); 1954	Nasrullah	Nearco
Dam Clear Ceiling (USA) 1968	Bold Ruler (USA); 1954	Nasrullah	Mumtaz Begum
Dam Clear Ceiling (USA) 1968	Bold Ruler (USA); 1954	Miss Disco	Discovery
Dam Clear Ceiling (USA) 1968	Bold Ruler (USA); 1954	Miss Disco	Outdone
Dam Clear Ceiling (USA) 1968	Grey Flight (USA); 1945	Mahmoud	Blenheim
Dam Clear Ceiling (USA) 1968	Grey Flight (USA); 1945	Mahmoud	Mah Mahal
Dam Clear Ceiling (USA) 1968	Grey Flight (USA); 1945	Planetoid	Ariel
Dam Clear Ceiling (USA) 1968	Grey Flight (USA); 1945	Planetoid	La Chica (Family:5-f)
