= To-Agori-Mou =

Thoroughbred racehorse

- Sire: Tudor Music
- Grandsire: Tudor Melody
- Dam: Sarah Van Fleet
- Damsire: Cracksman
- Sex: Stallion
- Foaled: 22 April 1978
- Country: Ireland
- Colour: Brown
- Breeder: Rathduff Stud
- Owner: Andry Muinos
- Trainer: Guy Harwood; John W. Russell
- Record: 18:7-6-1

Major wins
- Solario Stakes (1980); 2000 Guineas (1981); St. James's Palace Stakes (1981); Waterford Crystal Mile (1981); Queen Elizabeth II Stakes (1981)

Awards
- Timeform rating: 133 (1980, 1981); Top-rated British two-year-old (1980)

To-Agori-Mou (22 April 1978 – 1990) was an Irish-bred, British-trained Thoroughbred racehorse and sire who won the classic 2000 Guineas in 1981. He was the best British-trained two-year-old of 1980 when he won the Solario Stakes and was narrowly beaten by the Irish-trained Storm Bird in the Dewhurst Stakes. As a three-year-old he was beaten on his debut but justified his position as betting favourite in the 2000 Guineas. The rest of his season was dominated by a controversial four-race series in which he was matched against the Irish colt Kings Lake. His other major wins in 1981 came in the St. James's Palace Stakes, Waterford Crystal Mile and Queen Elizabeth II Stakes. In 1982 he was campaigned in the United States without success and was retired to stud where he had little success as a sire of winners.

== Background ==
To-Agori-Mou was a "big, rangy, attractive" dark brown horse with no white markings bred by the Rathduff Stud in County Tipperary, Ireland. His sire, Tudor Music, was a top-class sprinter whose wins included the July Cup: as a breeding stallion his record was not impressive, with his only previous Group Race winner being Orchestra, whose wins included the John Porter Stakes. To-Agori-Mou was by far the best horse produced by Sarah Van Fleet, a mare who won five races over hurdles. Sarah Van Fleet was a great granddaughter of the influential broodmare Sister Sarah, whose other descendants include St. Paddy, Flying Water, Russian Rhythm, Workforce, Nearctic, Shadayid, Swain, Love Divine, Brian Boru and Sixties Icon.

As a yearling, the colt was sent to the sales and was bought for 20,000 guineas by the trainer Guy Harwood, making him by far the most expensive of his sire's offspring sold in 1979. The colt entered the ownership of the Greek restaurateur Andry Muinos, who had just sold her three-year-old Ela-Mana-Mou to the Ballymacoll Stud for £500,000. She named the horse To-Agori-Mou (το αγόρι μου), the Greek for "My Boy". The colt was trained at Pulborough, West Sussex by Harwood who, at the time, was noted for his modern approach to training, introducing Britain to features such as artificial gallops and barn-style stabling. To-Agori-Mou was ridden in most of his major races by the British jockey Greville Starkey.

== Racing career ==
=== 1980: two-year-old season ===
To-Agori-Mou made his racecourse debut in a maiden race over six furlongs at Newmarket Racecourse in July. He was given a gentle ride from Starkey and finished second, beaten three-quarters of a length by the Queen's colt Church Parade. He recorded his first win in the Foxhall Maiden Stakes over seven furlongs at Goodwood Racecourse, taking the lead after a furlong and winning easily by two lengths from Clear Verdict. In August he won the Crawley Stakes at Lingfield Park Racecourse from six moderate opponents who, according to Timeform, "were barely able to get him out of a canter". To-Agori-Mou was then moved up in class to contest the Listed Solario Stakes at Sandown Park Racecourse on 29 August. Starting the 8/11 favourite he accelerated clear of the field in the final quarter mile and won by two lengths from Bold Raider, despite being eased down by Starkey in the closing stages.

In October, To-Agori-Mou contested Britain's most important races for two-year-olds, the Dewhurst Stakes over seven furlongs at Newmarket. He was opposed by the Irish-trained Storm Bird, winner of the National Stakes, the French-trained Miswaki, winner of the Prix de la Salamandre and Kirtling, winner of the Chesham Stakes. To-Agori-Mou was always in the first two and was the only horse able to respond when Storm Bird accelerated with two furlong left to run. The two colts quickly drew away from the field and after a protracted struggle, To-Agori-Mou finished second, beaten half a length.

=== Spring ===
When Storm Bird was ruled out of the classics by a series of problems, To-Agori-Mou became a strong favourite for the 2000 Guineas. He began his three-year-old season in the Craven Stakes at Newmarket in April. He started odds-on favourite, but appeared short of peak fitness and was beaten three quarters of a length by the 28/1 outsider Kind of Hush. Despite his defeat, To-Agori-Mou started the 5/2 favourite for the 173rd running of the 2000 Guineas over the Rowley Mile course at Newmarket on 2 May, with his main opponents appearing to be the Free Handicap winner Motavato (5/1), Kind of Hush (9/1) and the William Hill Futurity winner Beldale Flutter (10/1). Starkey restrained the colt at the rear of the nineteen runner field before moving forward with three furlongs left to run. He looked likely to win easily, but had to be driven out by Starkey to win by a neck from the 50/1 outsider Mattaboy, with Bel Bolide in third.

On 16 May, To-Agori-Mou was sent to Ireland and started 9/10 favourite for the Irish 2000 Guineas at the Curragh. The race was the most controversial of the year and saw the beginning of a four-race rivalry between To-Agori-Mou and the Vincent O'Brien-trained colt Kings Lake. Starkey held up To-Agori-Mou for a late run as usual and moved up to challenge Kings Lake, ridden by Pat Eddery in the last quarter mile. The Irish colt edged to the left in the closing stages and appeared to bump the favourite several times before winning by a neck. Starkey ended the race standing up in his stirrups and clearly indicated that he felt that his mount had been unfairly prevented from winning. The racecourse stewards concurred, and amended the result, awarding the victory to To-Agori-Mou. Kings Lake's connections refused to accept the verdict and took their appeal to the stewards of the Turf Club (the regulatory body for horseracing in Ireland), who, after a six-hour hearing, reinstated the original result. The decision created uproar and was widely condemned in both the British and Irish press.

=== Summer ===
The rematch between To-Agori-Mou and Kings Lake came in the St James's Palace Stakes over one mile at Royal Ascot. Starkey changed tactics and rode the 2/1 second favourite much closer to the pace than in previous races. Early in the straight he sent the colt through a gap on the inside and went into the lead by a length. Kings Lake emerged as the challenger, but To-Agori-Mou prevailed in a "thrilling battle" to win by a neck, with the first two pulling six lengths clear of the other runners. The race was not without controversy as Starkey turned in his saddle and appeared to make a two-fingered gesture to Eddery just after the finishing line. To-Agori-Mou and Kings Lake met for the third time in the Sussex Stakes at Goodwood Racecourse on 29 July in which they were opposed by older horses. Starkey reverted to hold-up tactics, restraining the 11/8 favourite before making his run in the straight. He made rapid progress and took the lead a furlong from the finish, but was caught in the final strides by King Lake and beaten by a head.

The fourth and final match between To-Agori-Mou and Kings Lake came in the Prix Jacques le Marois at Deauville Racecourse on 16 August. To-Agori-Mou evened the score, beating his rival by a nose, but neither colt was any match for the French-trained four-year-old Northjet, who won easily by five lengths. Later that month, To-Agori-Mou was matched against Moorestyle, the top-rated European racehorse of 1980, at two pounds worse than weight-for-age in the Waterford Crystal Mile at Goodwood. Starkey tracked Lester Piggott on Moorestyle before moving past the older horse in the straight and opening up a three-length advantage. To-Agori-Mou veered to the right in the closing stages but held off the renewed challenge of Moorestyle to win by half a length. To-Agori-Mou was one of fourteen horses selected to contest the inaugural running of the Arlington Million in Chicago, but the invitation was not taken up, leaving the filly Madam Gay to represent Britain.

=== Autumn ===
In late September, To-Agori-Mou ran in the Queen Elizabeth II Stakes at Ascot. The race was then a Group Two event, and weight penalties meant that he had to race at level weights against older horses, but he nevertheless started the 5/4 favourite. Ridden by Lester Piggott (Starkey was serving a suspension for careless riding), he was held up at the back of the field before moving up to take the lead inside the final furlong. He won by a length from the four-year-old Cracaval, who was subsequently disqualified for causing interference in the closing stages. In October, To-Agori-Mou was moved up in distance to contest the Champion Stakes over ten furlongs at Newmarket. He started 5/1 favourite, but after travelling well for most of the race he was unable to make any progress in the closing stages and finished fifth of the sixteen runners behind the French-trained colt Vayrann.

=== 1982: four-year-old season ===
In 1982, To-Agori-Mou was sent to race in the United States where he was trained by John W. Russell. He failed to win in four attempts, with his best placing being third in the Laurance Armour Handicap at Arlington Park in May. He was retired after finishing fifth in the American Handicap at Hollywood Park Racetrack in July.

== Assessment ==
To-Agori-Mou was rated 133 by the independent Timeform organisation in 1980, making him the second best two-year-old of the season, one pound behind Storm Bird. He was also rated second to Storm Bird in the official International Classification. In the following season he was again rated 133 by Timeform, while in the International Classification he was rated the equal-fourth-best three-year-old colt in Europe behind Shergar, Bikala and Cut Above. In their book A Century of Champions, John Randall and Tony Morris rated To-Agori-Mou an "average" 2000 Guineas winner and the forty-first best two-year-old trained in Britain or Ireland in the 20th century.

== Stud career ==
To-Agori-Mou was retired to become a breeding stallion in the United States, but appears to have attracted little interest. The most successful of his offspring was the sprinter Answer Do, who won fifteen races including the Grade II San Carlos Handicap and two runnings of the Grade III Phoenix Gold Cup. To-Agori-Mou was sold for $2,000 in 1989 and for $300 a year later. To-Agori-Mou died in 1990.

== Pedigree ==
Pedigree of To-Agori-Mou (IRE), brown stallion, 1978
Sire Tudor Music (GB) 1966	Tudor Melody (GB); 1956	Tudor Minstrel	Owen Tudor
Sire Tudor Music (GB) 1966	Tudor Melody (GB); 1956	Tudor Minstrel	Sansonnet
Sire Tudor Music (GB) 1966	Tudor Melody (GB); 1956	Matelda	Dante*
Sire Tudor Music (GB) 1966	Tudor Melody (GB); 1956	Matelda	Fairly Hot
Sire Tudor Music (GB) 1966	Fran (GB); 1959	Acropolis	Donatello
Sire Tudor Music (GB) 1966	Fran (GB); 1959	Acropolis	Aurora
Sire Tudor Music (GB) 1966	Fran (GB); 1959	Madrilene	Court Martial
Sire Tudor Music (GB) 1966	Fran (GB); 1959	Madrilene	Marmite
Dam Sarah Van Fleet (GB) 1966	Cracksman (IRE); 1958	Chamossaire	Precipitation
Dam Sarah Van Fleet (GB) 1966	Cracksman (IRE); 1958	Chamossaire	Snowberry
Dam Sarah Van Fleet (GB) 1966	Cracksman (IRE); 1958	Nearly	Nearco*
Dam Sarah Van Fleet (GB) 1966	Cracksman (IRE); 1958	Nearly	Lost Soul
Dam Sarah Van Fleet (GB) 1966	La Rage (GB); 1954	Mieuxce	Massine
Dam Sarah Van Fleet (GB) 1966	La Rage (GB); 1954	Mieuxce	L'Olivete
Dam Sarah Van Fleet (GB) 1966	La Rage (GB); 1954	Hell's Fury	Dante*
Dam Sarah Van Fleet (GB) 1966	La Rage (GB); 1954	Hell's Fury	Sister Sarah (Family:14-c)

* To-Agori-Mou is inbred 4S x 4D to the stallion Dante, meaning that he appears fourth generation on the sire side of his pedigree, and fourth generation on the dam side of his pedigree.

* To-Agori-Mou is inbred 5S x 4D x 5D to the stallion Nearco, meaning that he appears fifth generation (via Dante) on the sire side of his pedigree, and fourth generation and fifth generation (via Dante) on the dam side of his pedigree.
