= Al Nasr (horse) =

French-bred Thoroughbred racehorse

- Sire: Lyphard
- Grandsire: Northern Dancer
- Dam: Caretta
- Damsire: Caro
- Sex: Stallion
- Foaled: 11 February 1978
- Country: France
- Colour: Dark bay or Brown
- Breeder: Michel Henochsberg & Rene Romanet
- Owner: Moufid F. Dabaghi
- Trainer: André Fabre
- Record: 12:7-2-1

Major wins
- Prix La Force (1981); Prix de la Côte Normande (1981); Prix Exbury (1982); Prix Dollar (1982); Prix d'Ispahan (1982)

Awards
- Timeform rating 121 (1981), 126 (1982)

Al Nasr (11 February 1978 – 7 May 2003) was a French Thoroughbred racehorse and sire. He was one of the leading horses of his generation in France, winning the Prix La Force and Prix de la Côte Normande as three-year-old in 1981 before reaching his peak as a four-year-old when he won the Prix Exbury, Prix Dollar and Prix d'Ispahan. He failed to reproduce his best form when competing abroad, running poorly in The Derby and the Arlington Million. He was retired to stud in 1983 and had some success as a sire of winners. Al Nasr was the first major flat race winner trained by André Fabre.

== Background ==
Al Nasr was a strongly-built, good-looking, horse standing 16 hands high with no white markings bred in France by Michel Henochsberg and Rene Romanet. He was referred to as a bay during his racing career, but at stud was described as "dark bay or brown". He was sired by Lyphard, an American-bred, French-trained stallion who won the Prix Jacques Le Marois and Prix de la Forêt in 1972. At stud in the United States, Lyphard sired many important winner including Three Troikas, Manila and Dancing Brave. Al Nasr was the first foal produced by his dam Caretta, who won two races and went on to produce several other winners including Kingsalsa (Prix du Chemin de Fer du Nord). Caretta was a half-sister to Klaizia, the dam of Lypheor, who sired Tolomeo and Royal Heroine. As a yearling, Al Nasr was offered for sale and bought for Fr550,000 (approximately £58,000). He was sent into training with André Fabre who was best-known at the time as a trainer and rider of jumpers.

== Racing career ==
=== 1980: two-year-old season ===
Al Nasr made his only appearance of 1980 in a nineteen runner maiden race over 1600 metres at Saint-Cloud Racecourse in October. He was always among the leaders and won by a head from Mourtazam. In their annual Racehorses of 1980, the independent Timeform organisation described him as being "bound to go on to better things".

=== 1981: three-year-old season ===
Al Nasr began his three-year-old season with a win in the Prix de Suresnes over 2200m at Longchamp Racecourse in May. Later that month he was moved up in class for the Group Three Prix La Force over 2000m at the same course and won from Tow and Kentucky River. Al Nasr was unbeaten in three starts when he was sent to England to contest the 202nd running of the Derby Stakes at Epsom on 3 June. Ridden by Alfred Gibert he started at odds of 16/1 but ran very poorly and finished seventeenth of the eighteen runners behind Shergar. Al Nasr returned to France in July and finished second by a neck to Bellman in the Prix Eugène Adam, with the British-trained colts Church Parade and Kirtling in third and fourth. In August, Al Nasr was ridden by Yves Saint-Martin when he contested the Group Two Prix de La Cote Normande over 2000m at Deauville Racecourse and won easily by two and a half lengths from Brustolon. Al Nasr was being prepared for a run in the Prix de l'Arc de Triomphe when he sustained an ankle leg injury in training which ruled him out for the rest of the season. Late in 1981, a quarter share in the horse was sold to the Spendthrift Farm for an undisclosed sum.

=== 1982: four-year-old season ===
Al Nasr began his third season in the Group Three Prix Exbury at Saint-Cloud in March. He started odds-on favourite and "outclassed the opposition", winning easily from Mbaiki and Great Substence [sic]. He was then moved up in class for the Group Two Prix d'Harcourt at Longchamp and was beaten a neck by the five-year-old Lancastrian after losing a shoe during the race. In the Group One Prix Ganay he finished third to Bikala and Lancastrian, in a strong field, finishing ahead of Vayrann, Kalaglow and April Run. Al Nasr recorded his fourth Group race success at Longchamp when he won the Prix Dollar, beating the multiple Group One winner The Wonder by a neck. He was carrying six pounds less than the runner up, although Timeform pointed out that he appeared to win more easily than the official margin suggested.

On 27 June, Al Nasr met The Wonder at level weights in the Group One Prix d'Ispahan over 1850m at Longchamp. The two four-year-olds started at odds of 7/2 and 9/4 respectively while the three-year-old Melyno, winner of the Poule d'Essai des Poulains and the Prix Jean Prat was made the 6/10 favourite. Ridden by Alain Lequeux, Al Nasr tracked the pacemaker Mourtazam, but lost ground when the other main contenders quickened early in the straight. In the last 200m, Al Nasr rallied strongly along the inside rail, took the lead in the closing stages, and won by three-quarters of a length and a neck from The Wonder and Melyno. Al Nasr was then trained for the major turf races in North America, beginning with the second running of the Arlington Million in Chicago. Fabré closely supervised the horse's preparation, flying across the Atlantic six times to check on his progress. In the race, he was prominent for much of the race, but dropped away quickly in the straight and finished thirteenth of the fourteen runners behind Perrault. He was found to have suffered a recurrence of the ankle injury which affected him in 1981 and did not race again.

== Assessment ==
In 1981, the independent Timeform organisation gave Al Nasr a rating of 121. In the International Classification he was rated eighteen pounds below the top-rated Shergar. In 1982, Timeform gave him a rating of 126, eight pounds below the top-rated trio Ardross, Assert and Green Forest. In the International Classification he was rated the fifth-best older male horse in Europe and the tenth best horse of any age.

== Stud career ==
Al Nasr was retired to stand as a breeding stallion at Spendthrift Farm at an initial stud fee of $40,000 a mare. He was not an outstanding stallion, but did sire several good winners including Zaizoom (Derby Italiano), Acteur Franceis (Prix Morny), Star Recruit (Alysheba Stakes), Prince of Andros (Cumberland Lodge Stakes), Majmu (May Hill Stakes) and Lord of Tusmore (Rose of Lancaster Stakes). He was later exported to stand in Italy where his last foals were born in 2003. Al Nasr died in May of 2003 at age 25.

== Pedigree ==
Pedigree of Al Nasr, dark bay or brown stallion, 1978
Sire Lyphard (USA) 1969	Northern Dancer (CAN); 1961	Nearctic	Nearco
Sire Lyphard (USA) 1969	Northern Dancer (CAN); 1961	Nearctic	Lady Angela
Sire Lyphard (USA) 1969	Northern Dancer (CAN); 1961	Natalma	Native Dancer
Sire Lyphard (USA) 1969	Northern Dancer (CAN); 1961	Natalma	Almahmoud
Sire Lyphard (USA) 1969	Goofed (USA); 1960	Court Martial	Fair Trial
Sire Lyphard (USA) 1969	Goofed (USA); 1960	Court Martial	Instantaneous
Sire Lyphard (USA) 1969	Goofed (USA); 1960	Barra	Formor
Sire Lyphard (USA) 1969	Goofed (USA); 1960	Barra	La Favorite
Dam Caretta (IRE) 1973	Caro (IRE); 1967	Fortino	Grey Sovereign
Dam Caretta (IRE) 1973	Caro (IRE); 1967	Fortino	Ranavalo
Dam Caretta (IRE) 1973	Caro (IRE); 1967	Chambord	Chamossaire
Dam Caretta (IRE) 1973	Caro (IRE); 1967	Chambord	Life Hill
Dam Caretta (IRE) 1973	Klainia (FR); 1960	Klairon	Clarion
Dam Caretta (IRE) 1973	Klainia (FR); 1960	Klairon	Kalmia
Dam Caretta (IRE) 1973	Klainia (FR); 1960	Kalitka	Tourment
Dam Caretta (IRE) 1973	Klainia (FR); 1960	Kalitka	Princesse d'Amour (Family 4-r)
