= Blue Wind =

Irish-bred Thoroughbred racehorse

- Racing silks of Bertram and Diana Firestone
- Sire: Lord Gayle
- Grandsire: Sir Gaylord
- Dam: Azurine
- Damsire: Chamossaire
- Sex: Mare
- Foaled: 3 May 1978
- Country: Ireland
- Colour: Bay
- Breeder: Betty Laidlaw
- Owner: Diana Firestone
- Trainer: Paddy Prendergast Jr. Dermot Weld; Stanley M. Hough
- Record: 18:5-2-3

Major wins
- Silken Glider Stakes (1980); Oaks Stakes (1981); Irish Oaks (1981)

Awards
- Timeform rating: 110 (1980), 127 (1981)

Honours
- Blue Wind Stakes at Naas Racecourse

Blue Wind (3 May 1978 – 21 June 1996) was an Irish Thoroughbred racehorse and broodmare best known for winning the classic Oaks Stakes in 1981. She showed promising form as a two-year-old in 1980 when she won two of her five races including the Silken Glider Stakes. In the following year she finished second in the Irish 1,000 Guineas and then showed her best form when moved up in distance, winning the Oaks by seven lengths and following up in the Irish Oaks a month later. In 1982 she was campaigned in the United States without success. She made no impact as a broodmare.

== Background ==
Blue Wind was a dark chestnut mare with a white sock on her left hind leg bred in Ireland by Betty Laidlaw. She was sired by Lord Gayle, an American-bred stallion who won the Prix Perth in 1970. Lord Gayle's other winning progeny included Carroll House, Desirable, Gay Lemur (Jockey Club Stakes) and the leading hurdler Pollardstown. Blue Wind's dam was a granddaughter of the broodmare Dunure, whose other descendants included the Irish Derby winner Dark Warrior and the St Leger winner Bollin Eric.

As a yearling the filly was sold for 5,600 guineas and sent into training with Paddy Prendergast.

== Racing career ==
=== 1980: two-year-old season ===
Blue Wind finished unplaced over six furlongs on her racecourse debut, and then ran second over 7 1/2 furlongs. In August she recorded her first victory when she won a seven furlong maiden race at Gowran Park by five lengths. In September she was moved up in class and distance for the Group Three Silken Glider Stakes over one mile at Leopardstown Racecourse and won by 2 1/2 lengths from the Dermot Weld-trained Overplay. Blue Wind was sent to France in October for the Group One Prix Marcel Boussac. She dead-heated for sixth place, 2 1/2 lengths behind the winner Tropicaro. In November, the filly was sent to the Goffs Sales where she was bought for 180,000 guineas by representatives of the American owner and breeder Diana Firestone. Blue Wind was moved to the stable of Dermot Weld at the Curragh, County Kildare.

=== 1981: three-year-old season ===
Blue Wind made her first appearance as a three-year-old at Phoenix Park Racecourse in April when she won the Edenderry Stakes over one mile. On 23 May, she was ridden by Wally Swinburn in the Irish 1,000 Guineas over one mile at the Curragh Racecourse. Racing on heavy ground, she started at odds of 6/1 and finished second of the fifteen runners, a length behind the winner Arctique Royale.

On 6 June, Blue Wind was one of twelve fillies to contest the 203rd running of the Oaks over 1 1/2 miles at Epsom Downs Racecourse. Ridden by the veteran Lester Piggott she started 3/1 joint-favourite with Leap Lively, a filly who had won the Fillies' Mile and the Lingfield Oaks Trial. The other leading contenders were Go Leasing (third in the 1000 Guineas, 11/2), Tropicaro (6/1) and Madam Gay (10/1). Leap Lively went into the lead from the start and set such a strong pace that most of the other runners were struggling before half distance and with three furlongs left to run only Blue Wind and Madam Gay were still in touch with the leader. At this point, Leap Lively began to struggle and Piggott sent the Irish filly into the lead approaching the final quarter mile. Blue Wind quickly established a clear lead and drew away in the closing stages to win by seven lengths from Madam Gay, who was in turn ten lengths clear of the exhausted Leap Lively. With the rest of the field separated by similarly wide margins Timeform described the finish as bearing "some resemblance to that of a three-mile steeplechase". Blue Wind's winning time of 2:40.93 was more than three seconds faster than that set by Shergar when winning the Derby over the same course and distance three days earlier. Blue Wind returned to Ireland for the Irish Oaks at the Curragh on 18 July. Ridden by Wally Swinburn, snr, she was made 4/6 favourite against nine opponents headed by Arctique Royale and the Musidora Stakes winner Condessa. Blue Wind took the lead on the turn into the straight, went clear of the field, and held off the challenge of Condessa to win by 2 1/2 lengths. Blue Wind's form was boosted by the performances of Madam Gay who won the Prix de Diane, and finished second to Shergar (beaten four lengths) in the King George VI and Queen Elizabeth Stakes. In late summer, Weld described Blue Wind as "the best I've ever trained ... a really super filly".

Blue Wind was rested for two months before returning in the Joe McGrath Memorial Stakes over ten furlongs at Leopardstown Racecourse in which she was matched against colts and older horses. She was made the 2/1 favourite but never looked likely to win and finished fourth of the twelve runners behind Kings Lake. On her final European start Blue Wind ran in the Prix de l'Arc de Triomphe at Longchamp Racecourse on 4 October. She started at odds of 13/2, being coupled in the betting with the other Firestone runner April Run, but was nevercontention and finished fifteenth of the twenty-four runners behind Gold River. Timeform's view was that the filly never fully recovered from her hard races in spring and summer.

=== 1982: four-year-old season ===
In 1982, Blue Wind's owners brought her to race in the United States, where she was trained by Stanley M. Hough. She did not reproduce her European form, failing to win in seven races. Her best placings came when she finished third in Allowance races at Belmont Park (twice) and Saratoga.

== Assessment ==
In 1980, the independent Timeform origination gave Blue Wind a rating of 110, fourteen pounds below their top-rated two-year-old filly Marwell. In the following year she was given a peak annual timeform rating of 127, six pounds behind Marwell. In the official International Classification she was rated the third-best three-year-old filly in Europe behind Marwell and April Run. In their book, A Century of Champions, based on the Timeform rating system, John Randall and Tony Morris rated Blue Wind an "average" winner of the Oaks.

== Stud career ==
Blue Wind was retired from racing to become a broodmare for her owner's stud in Virginia but her record was very disappointing. She was exported to Japan in 1991 and died at the Taiki Farm in Hokkaido on 21 June 1996. She produced eight foals between 1984 and 1996, three that won minor races:

- Legal Circles (bay colt, foaled in 1984, sired by Alleged) was unraced
- Carefree Dancer (chestnut colt, foaled in 1987, sired by Nijinsky), won four races in Ireland
- Sapphire Breeze (bay filly, foaled in 1988, sired by Lyphard) failed to win in three races
- Coast Wind (brown filly, foaled in 1989, sired by Chief's Crown) third in only race
- Shinko Easter (chestnut colt, foaled in 1992, sired by Tony Bin) won one race in Japan
- Taiki Mistral (bay colt, foaled in 1995, sired by Dancing Brave) raced in Japan and won one race

== Pedigree ==
Pedigree of Blue Wind (IRE), chestnut mare, 1978
Sire Lord Gayle (USA) 1965	Sir Gaylord (USA); 1959	Turn-To	Royal Charger
Sire Lord Gayle (USA) 1965	Sir Gaylord (USA); 1959	Turn-To	Source Sucree
Sire Lord Gayle (USA) 1965	Sir Gaylord (USA); 1959	Somethingroyal	Princequillo
Sire Lord Gayle (USA) 1965	Sir Gaylord (USA); 1959	Somethingroyal	Imperatrice
Sire Lord Gayle (USA) 1965	Sticky Case (GB); 1958	Court Martial	Fair Trial
Sire Lord Gayle (USA) 1965	Sticky Case (GB); 1958	Court Martial	Instantaneous
Sire Lord Gayle (USA) 1965	Sticky Case (GB); 1958	Run Honey	Hyperion
Sire Lord Gayle (USA) 1965	Sticky Case (GB); 1958	Run Honey	Honey Buzzard
Dam Azurine (IRE) 1957	Chamossaire (GB); 1942	Precipitation	Hurry On
Dam Azurine (IRE) 1957	Chamossaire (GB); 1942	Precipitation	Double Life
Dam Azurine (IRE) 1957	Chamossaire (GB); 1942	Snowberry	Cameronian
Dam Azurine (IRE) 1957	Chamossaire (GB); 1942	Snowberry	Myrobella
Dam Azurine (IRE) 1957	Blue Dun (GB); 1950	Blue Train	Blue Peter
Dam Azurine (IRE) 1957	Blue Dun (GB); 1950	Blue Train	Sun Chariot
Dam Azurine (IRE) 1957	Blue Dun (GB); 1950	Dunure	Umidwar
Dam Azurine (IRE) 1957	Blue Dun (GB); 1950	Dunure	Carrick Shore (Family:4-d)
