= Cairn Rouge Stakes =

Flat horse race in Ireland

Cairn Rouge Stakes
2026
Meriden	Green Carrera	Sky Watch

Previous years
2025
Red Letter	Fiery Lucy	Ecstatic
2024
Greenfinch	Sakti	Flight Of Fancy
2023
Indian Wish	Unless	Giladah
2022
Cigamia	Panama Red	Voice Of Angels
2021
Mehnah	Emaniya	Thinking Of You

2020-2014
2020
Lovelier	Celestial Object	Kassaba
2019
Viadera	Lady Wannabe	Simply Beautiful
2018
Bella Estrella	Hence	Panstarr
2017
Drumfad Bay	Music Box	Petticoat
2016
Creggs Pipes	Assume	Duchess Andorra
2015
Off Limits	Military Angel	Easter
2014
Palace	Dalkova	Beyond Brilliance

The Cairn Rouge Stakes is a Listed flat horse race in Ireland open to thoroughbred fillies and mares aged three years or older. It is run at Killarney over a distance of 1 mile and 100 yards (1,701 metres), and it is scheduled to take place each year in July.

The race was first run in 2014. It is named in honour of Cairn Rouge, an Irish-trained filly who won the Irish 1,000 Guineas and Champion Stakes in 1980.

== Records ==
Leading jockey (3 wins):

- Declan McDonogh – Creggs Pipes (2016), Bella Estrella (2018), Indian Wish (2023)
- Wayne Lordan - Off Limits (2015), Lovelier (2020), Greenfinch (2024)

Leading trainer (3 wins):

- Aidan O'Brien – Palace (2014), Lovelier (2020), Greenfinch (2024)

== Winners ==
Year	Winner	Age	Jockey	Trainer	Time
2014	Palace	3	Seamie Heffernan	Aidan O'Brien	1:40.90
2015	Off Limits	3	Wayne Lordan	David Wachman	1:41.23
2016	Creggs Pipes	4	Declan McDonogh	Andrew Slattery	1:42.56
2017	Drumfad Bay	3	Colm O'Donoghue	Jessica Harrington	1:40.33
2018	Bella Estrella	4	Declan McDonogh	Dermot Weld	1:40.33
2019	Viadera	3	Colin Keane	Ger Lyons	1:41.26
2020	Lovelier	3	Wayne Lordan	Aidan O'Brien	1:42.70
2021	Mehnah	3	Chris Hayes	Kevin Prendergast	1:41.95
2022	Cigamia	3	Billy Lee	Willie McCreery	1:43.70
2023	Indian Wish	4	Declan McDonogh	Joseph O'Brien	1:41.58
2024	Greenfinch	3	Wayne Lordan	Aidan O'Brien	1:41.63
2025	Red Letter	3	Colin Keane	Ger Lyons	1:46.15
2026	Meriden	3	Chris Hayes	Denis Hogan	1:42.71

== See also ==
- Horse racing in Ireland
- List of Irish flat horse races
