= Madam Gay =

British-bred Thoroughbred racehorse

- Racing silks of Geoffrey Kaye and Daniel Wildenstein
- Sire: Star Appeal
- Grandsire: Appiani
- Dam: Saucy Flirt
- Damsire: King's Troop
- Sex: Mare
- Foaled: 25 February 1978
- Country: United Kingdom
- Colour: Bay
- Breeder: Worksop Manor Stud
- Owner: Geoffrey Kaye; Daniel Wildenstein
- Trainer: Paul Kelleway
- Record: 13: 1-4-3

Major wins
- Prix de Diane (1981)

Madam Gay (25 February 1978 – 1983) was a British Thoroughbred racehorse. She showed some promise as a two-year-old in 1980 before developing into a top-class middle-distance performer in the following year. Her only victory in a thirteen-race career came when she won the Prix de Diane in 1981, but she was placed in many important races, including the Oaks Stakes, King George VI and Queen Elizabeth Stakes, Arlington Million and Prix Vermeille. Having been originally bought for 8,000 guineas she was eventually sold for a reported $1.4 million.

== Background ==
Madam Gay was a dark-coated bay mare with a small white star and a white sock on her left hind leg, bred by the Worksop Manor Stud in Nottinghamshire. She was one of the best horses sired by Star Appeal, an Irish-bred, German-trained horse who won the Eclipse Stakes and Prix de l'Arc de Triomphe in 1975. Madam Gay's dam Saucy Flirt was a sprinter who won handicap races at York and Leicester.

As a yearling, the filly was sent to the Tattersalls sales at Newmarket in October and was bought for 8,000 guineas by Geoffrey Kaye. She was sent into training with Paul Kelleway, a former National Hunt jockey, at his Shalfleet stables on the Bury Road in Newmarket, Suffolk.

== Racing career ==
=== 1980: two-year-old season ===
Madam Gay finished unplaced in her first two races, including the Chesham Stakes at Royal Ascot. Despite these defeats she was moved up in class to contest the Group 3 Waterford Candelabra Stakes at Goodwood Racecourse. She finished strongly to take second place in a field of ten runners behind Fairy Footsteps. In their annual Racehorses of 1980, the independent Timeform organisation described her as being "sure to win, when her sights are lowered".

=== 1981: three-year-old season ===
Kelleway showed no inclination to "lower the sights", running the filly against the best available opposition in Europe and North America in 1981. After finishing third in the Princess Elizabeth Stakes on her first appearance she contested the Classic 1000 Guineas over Newmarket's Rowley Mile course. Ridden by Tony Murray, she started a 50/1 outsider, but was beaten less than one and a half lengths as she finished fifth behind Fairy Footsteps. In the Musidora Stakes, a trial race for The Oaks, Madam Gay reversed the Newmarket form with Fairy Footsteps but was beaten four lengths into second place by the Irish filly Condessa.

On 6 June, Madam Gay was moved up in distance for the Oaks over one and a half miles at Epsom Downs Racecourse and started the 10/1 fifth choice in the betting. Ridden by John Reid she was one of very few runners able to stay in contention with the strong pace set by Leap Lively. She eventually finished second, seven lengths behind Blue Wind, but ten lengths clear of the other runners. Madam Gay was still without a win in seven starts when she was sent to France to contest the Group 1 Prix de Diane (French Oaks) over 2100 metres at Chantilly Racecourse eight days later. Ridden by Lester Piggott she started at odd of 9/1 in a field which included April Run, Val d'Erica ( winner of the Oaks d'Italia), Tootens (Prix Saint Alary) and Ukraine Girl (Poule d'Essai des Pouliches). Madam Gay was restrained by Piggott towards the back of the field before moving into contention in the straight. She sprinted past her opponents, went clear of the field and won by four lengths from Val d'Erica in a race record time of 2:06.5 despite being eased down in the closing stages. Madam Gay was then matched against colts and older horses in the Eclipse Stakes on 4 July over ten furlongs at Sandown Park Racecourse where she finished fifth of the eight runners behind Master Willie. Three weeks later, she contested Britain's most prestigious all-aged race, the King George VI and Queen Elizabeth Stakes at Ascot Racecourse. She was ridden by Greville Starkey and started a 40/1 outsider in a field which included Shergar (the 2/5 favourite), Master Willie, Light Cavalry and Pelerin (Hardwicke Stakes). Although she was no match for Shergar, Madam Gay stayed on strongly in the straight to finish second, four lengths behind the winner.

On 30 August, Madam Gay represented Britain in the inaugural running of the Arlington Million, then the world's most valuable horse race, after her owners paid a supplementary entry fee of $35,000. She was partnered by Piggott who was unable to ride at less than 117 pounds, meaning that Madam Gay had to carry four pounds more than weight-for-age. She was settled behind the leaders along the rail before moving up into third place approaching the final turn. The filly could make no further progress, but stayed on to finish third of the fourteen runners beaten a nose and two lengths by John Henry and The Bart. During her stay in the United States it was made known that the filly was available for sale at a price of $2,000,000, but there were no takers. She then returned to Europe for the Prix Vermeille at Longchamp Racecourse on 13 September. She was made the 7/4 favourite, but after being given a great deal of ground to make up in the straight she finished third to April Run and Leandra. Madam Gay was then bought for an undisclosed sum (later reported as $1.4 million) to Daniel Wildenstein in a private deal. On her final racecourse appearance, Madam Gay produced one of her few poor efforts as she finished tenth behind Vayrann in the Champion Stakes at Newmarket on 17 October.

At the end of the season, Madam Gay was exported to continue her racing career in the United States. Madam Gay died in 1983 and did not produce any registered offspring.

== Assessment ==
In 1980, the independent Timeform organisation gave Madam Gay a rating of 107, seventeen pounds below their top-rated two-year-old filly Marwell. In the Free Handicap, a rating of the best two-year-olds to race in Britain, she was given a weight of 111 pounds, fifteen pounds below Marwell and twenty-one pounds below the top colt Storm Bird. In the following year, Madam Gay was rated 125 by Timeform, eight pounds below Marwell. She was rated the fifth-best three-year-old filly in Europe in the International Classification.

== Pedigree ==
Pedigree of Madam Gay (GB), bay mare, 1978
Sire Star Appeal (IRE) 1970	Appiani (ITY); 1963	Herbager	Vandale
Sire Star Appeal (IRE) 1970	Appiani (ITY); 1963	Herbager	Flagette
Sire Star Appeal (IRE) 1970	Appiani (ITY); 1963	Angela Rucellai	Rockefella
Sire Star Appeal (IRE) 1970	Appiani (ITY); 1963	Angela Rucellai	Aristareta
Sire Star Appeal (IRE) 1970	Sterna (GER); 1960	Neckar	Ticino
Sire Star Appeal (IRE) 1970	Sterna (GER); 1960	Neckar	Nixe
Sire Star Appeal (IRE) 1970	Sterna (GER); 1960	Stammesart	Alchimist
Sire Star Appeal (IRE) 1970	Sterna (GER); 1960	Stammesart	Stammesfahne
Dam Saucy Flirt (GB) 1968	King's Troop (GB); 1957	Princely Gift	Nasrullah
Dam Saucy Flirt (GB) 1968	King's Troop (GB); 1957	Princely Gift	Blue Gem
Dam Saucy Flirt (GB) 1968	King's Troop (GB); 1957	Equiria	Atout Maitre
Dam Saucy Flirt (GB) 1968	King's Troop (GB); 1957	Equiria	Epona
Dam Saucy Flirt (GB) 1968	Picnic Party (GB); 1959	Honeyway	Fairway
Dam Saucy Flirt (GB) 1968	Picnic Party (GB); 1959	Honeyway	Honey Buzzard
Dam Saucy Flirt (GB) 1968	Picnic Party (GB); 1959	Garden City	Mieuxce
Dam Saucy Flirt (GB) 1968	Picnic Party (GB); 1959	Garden City	Babylon (Family: 7-a)
