= Kalaglow =

Irish-bred Thoroughbred racehorse and sire (1978–1994)

- Sire: Kalamoun
- Grandsire: Zeddaan
- Dam: Rossitor
- Damsire: Pall Mall
- Sex: Stallion
- Foaled: 19 February 1978
- Died: 1994 (aged 15–16)
- Country: Ireland
- Colour: Grey
- Breeder: Someries Stud
- Owner: Tony Ward
- Trainer: Guy Harwood
- Record: 14:10-0-0

Major wins
- Horris Hill Stakes (1980); Heath Stakes (1981); Earl of Sefton Stakes (1982); Brigadier Gerard Stakes (1982); Eclipse Stakes (1982); King George VI and Queen Elizabeth Stakes (1982); Timeform rating: 132
- Last updated on 20 August 2024

Kalaglow (1978–1994) was an Irish-bred, British-trained Thoroughbred race horse and sire. In a career which lasted from August 1980 until October 1982 he ran fourteen times and won ten races. He is most notable for his performances in 1982 when he "lit up the summer" with victories including the Eclipse Stakes and King George VI and Queen Elizabeth Stakes.

== Background ==
Kalaglow was a grey horse, standing just over 16 hands high, sired by Kalamoun (winner of the Poule d'Essai des Poulains and the Prix Jacques Le Marois) out of the mare Rossitor. During his racing career he was dark in colour, but like all grey horses, he lightened as he aged. As a yearling he was sent to the Newmarket October sales where he was bought for 11,500 guineas by the bloodstock agent James Delahooke on behalf of the trainer Guy Harwood. The colt subsequently entered into the ownership of Tony Ward and was trained by Harwood at Pulborough, West Sussex. Kalaglow was ridden in most of his important races by the veteran British jockey Greville Starkey.

Kalaglow's name was the result of a mistake: he was originally registered as being by Kalamoun, out of a mare named Aglow. The true identity of Kalaglow's dam was only discovered when he was four years old, long after he had been named by combining the titles of both his "parents". Both Aglow and Rossitor were chestnut fillies bred by the Someries Stud and sent into training with Geoff Smyth. The accidental switch seemed to have occurred when they were transferred from the stud farm to the racing stable in 1972 but it was a full decade before a member of staff at the Irish National Stud noticed that "Aglow"'s white markings did not match those described on her identity documents.

== Racing career ==
=== 1980: two-year-old season ===
Kalaglow was undefeated in five races as a two-year-old in 1980. He began his career in August, when he won a maiden race at Newmarket by six lengths and later that month he won a seven furlong race at Newbury beating a field which included the future St Leger winner Cut Above. In September he won a Nursery handicap at Newbury in which he conceded weight to all his opponents and then stepped up in distance to win a mile race at Goodwood. His most significant win came on his last start when he won the Group Three Horris Hill Stakes at Newbury, beating Cut Above (who was receiving five pounds) by three-quarters of a length. At the end of the season, Kalaglow was rated eleven pounds behind the European champion Storm Bird.

=== 1981: three-year-old season ===
In early 1981, Kalaglow was prepared by his trainer for a run in The Derby and won on his debut in the Heath Stakes at Newmarket in April. He then ran in the Dante Stakes at York, but failed to show his best form on soft ground and finished unplaced behind Beldale Flutter. In the Derby Kalaglow was injured early on and finished unplaced behind Shergar. His injuries ruled him out of racing for the rest of the season. Harwood later described the colt's three-year-old season as "a bit of a farce".

=== 1982: four-year-old season ===
As a four-year-old Kalaglow returned to win four of his six races. He won the nine furlong Earl of Sefton Stakes at Newmarket's Craven meeting in April and then ran poorly behind Bikala on soft ground in the Prix Ganay before taking the ten furlong Brigadier Gerard Stakes at Sandown Park in May. In the latter race he took the lead in the straight and pulled steadily clear to win by eight lengths from a field which included the Irish-trained filly Stanerra. In July he was moved up to Group One class for the first time in over a year for the Eclipse Stakes at Sandown. He started 11/10 favourite won easily by four lengths from Lobkowiez. Three weeks later, Kalaglow contested Britain's most prestigious all-aged race, the King George VI and Queen Elizabeth Stakes at Ascot, for which Assert, the winner of the Prix du Jockey Club and the Irish Derby started 11/10 favourite. Kalaglow, starting at odds of 13/2 produced a strong late run to win by a neck from Assert, with Glint of Gold three lengths back in third and Bikala fourth.

Plans to run Kalaglow in the Prix de l'Arc de Triomphe at Longchamp in October were abandoned when it was decided that the colt would be unsuited by the soft ground. Two weeks later he made his final appearance in the Champion Stakes at Newmarket in which he failed to reproduce his summer form, finishing unplaced behind the three-year-old filly Time Charter.

At the end of the season was rated the best four-year-old in Europe by the International Classification.

== Stud record ==
Kalaglow was a modest success as a sire of winners during a breeding career which was mainly spent at the Brook Stud at Newmarket. His best-known offspring was the Melbourne Cup winner Jeune, but he also sired the European Group 1 winners Timarida and Sternkoenig (Grosser Preis von Berlin) as well as Red Glow who started favourite for the 1988 Epsom Derby.

== Pedigree ==
Pedigree of Kalaglow (IRE), grey stallion, 1978
Sire Kalamoun (GB) 1970	Zeddaan (GB); 1965	Grey Sovereign	Nasrullah
Sire Kalamoun (GB) 1970	Zeddaan (GB); 1965	Grey Sovereign	Kong
Sire Kalamoun (GB) 1970	Zeddaan (GB); 1965	Vareta	Vilmorin
Sire Kalamoun (GB) 1970	Zeddaan (GB); 1965	Vareta	Veronique
Sire Kalamoun (GB) 1970	Khairunissa (GB); 1960	Prince Bio	Prince Rose
Sire Kalamoun (GB) 1970	Khairunissa (GB); 1960	Prince Bio	Biologie
Sire Kalamoun (GB) 1970	Khairunissa (GB); 1960	Palariva	Palestine*
Sire Kalamoun (GB) 1970	Khairunissa (GB); 1960	Palariva	Rivaz
Dam Rossitor (GB) 1970	Pall Mall (IRE); 1955	Palestine*	Fair Trial
Dam Rossitor (GB) 1970	Pall Mall (IRE); 1955	Palestine*	Una
Dam Rossitor (GB) 1970	Pall Mall (IRE); 1955	Malapert	Portlaw
Dam Rossitor (GB) 1970	Pall Mall (IRE); 1955	Malapert	Malatesta
Dam Rossitor (GB) 1970	Sonia (GB); 1965	Worden	Wild Risk
Dam Rossitor (GB) 1970	Sonia (GB); 1965	Worden	Sans Tares
Dam Rossitor (GB) 1970	Sonia (GB); 1965	Sonsa	Hyperion
Dam Rossitor (GB) 1970	Sonia (GB); 1965	Sonsa	Duplicity (Family:2-i)

- Kalaglow was inbred 3 x 4 to the 2000 Guineas winner Palestine, meaning that this stallion appears in both the third and fourth generations of his pedigree.
