= Guy Harwood =

British racehorse trainer

Personal information
- Born: Pulborough, West Sussex
- Occupation: Trainer

Horse racing career
- Sport: Horse racing

Major racing wins
- British Classics / Breeders' Cup wins: 2000 Guineas (1981, 1986) International race wins: Prix de l'Arc de Triomphe (1986); Poule d'Essai des Poulains (1981)

Significant horses
- Ela-Mana-Mou, To-Agori-Mou, Kalaglow, Rousillon, Dancing Brave, Warning.

Guy Harwood (born 10 June 1939) is a retired British racehorse trainer.

== Background ==
Harwood was born in Pulborough, West Sussex, in 1939. His father, Wally made the family fortune with his garage business, founded in 1931. Harwood began riding at the age of 18 and won 40 point-to-point races and 14 National Hunt races over the next few years.

== Training career ==
He began training horses in 1965 under permit, and took out a training licence in 1966, establishing the Coombelands racing stables. In the 1970s, Harwood developed his stable to become one of the most modern in Britain, introducing such innovations as artificial gallops, American-style barns and a computerised office system. He trained many winners there, including Dancing Brave, winner of the 1986 Prix de l'Arc de Triomphe and European Horse of the Year for 1986. In 1996 his daughter, Amanda Perrett, took over the reins at Coombelands. Harwood received the prestigious Goodwood Racecourse Media Dinner Award for 2007. Harwood lives in Coldwaltham.

== Major wins as a trainer ==
(United Kingdom) Great Britain

- 2,000 Guineas – (2) - To-Agori-Mou (1981), Dancing Brave (1986)
- Queen Anne Stakes – (2) – Rousillon (1985), Warning (1989)
- St. James's Palace Stakes - (1) - To-Agori-Mou (1981)
- Ascot Gold Cup - (2)- Sadeem (1988) & (1989)
- Diamond Jubilee Stakes – (2) – Indian King (1982), Polish Patriot (1991)
- July Cup – (1) – Polish Patriot (1991)
- King George VI and Queen Elizabeth Stakes - (2) Kalaglow (1982), Dancing Brave (1986)
- Sussex Stakes - (2) - Rousillon (1985), Warning (1988)
- Nassau Stakes - (2) - Go Leasing (1981), Mamaluna (1989)
- Eclipse Stakes - (2) - Kalaglow (1982), Dancing Brave (1986)
- International Stakes - (1) - Ile de Chypre (1989)
- Diadem Stakes - (1) - Indian King (1982)
- Queen Elizabeth II Stakes – (4) – Jan Ekels (1973), To-Agori-Mou (1981), Sackford (1983), Warning (1988)
- Racing Post Trophy – (2) Alphabatim (1983), Bakharoff (1985)

France

- Poule d'Essai des Poulains - (1) - Recitation (1981)
- Prix de l'Arc de Triomphe - (1) - Dancing Brave (1986)
- Prix Jean Prat - (1) - Young Generation (1979)
- Prix Jacques Le Marois - (1) Lear Fan (1984)
- Prix du Moulin de Longchamp - (1) - Rousillon (1985)
- Prix Jean-Luc Lagardère - (1) - Recitation (1980)
- Prix de la Forêt – (1) – Brocade (1985)

(Republic of Ireland) Ireland

- Tattersalls Gold Cup – Ile de Chypre (1989)

United States

- Man o' War Stakes - (1) - Defensive Play (1990)
- Joe Hirsch Turf Classic Invitational Stakes - (1) - Cacoethes (1990)
