= Detroit (horse) =

French-bred Thoroughbred racehorse (1977–2001)

- Sire: Riverman
- Grandsire: Never Bend
- Dam: Derna
- Damsire: Sunny Boy
- Sex: Mare
- Foaled: 24 February 1977
- Country: France
- Colour: Brown
- Breeder: Societe Aland
- Owner: Robert Sangster
- Trainer: Olivier Douieb
- Record: 13:8-0-1

Major wins
- Prix Fille de l'Air (1980); Prix Chloé (1980); Prix de la Nonette (1980); Prix de l'Arc de Triomphe (1980); Prix Ridgway (1981); Prix Foy (1981)

Awards
- Timeform rating: 131 (1980), 126 (1981)
- Last updated on 26 September 2023

Detroit (24 February 1977 – 20 May 2001) was a French Thoroughbred racehorse and broodmare who won the Prix de l'Arc de Triomphe in 1980. Unraced as a two-year-old, Detroit won her first four races in 1980 including the Prix Fille de l'Air, Prix Chloé and Prix de la Nonette. She was beaten when favourite for the Prix Vermeille before winning the Arc in record time. She remained in training as a four-year-old and won three more races including the Prix Foy. She was retired to stud where she produced the Arc de Triomphe winner Carnegie.

== Background ==
Detroit was a brown mare with a white blaze and white socks on her hind legs bred in France by Société Åland. She was sired by Riverman a French horse who won the Poule d'Essai des Poulains in 1972. As a breeding stallion he was highly successful, being the sire of many important winners including Irish River, Bahri, Gold River, River Memories and Triptych. Detroit's dam Derna had previously produced Durtal, who won the Cheveley Park Stakes and was the dam of the Ascot Gold Cup winner Gildoran. Another daughter of Derna was Valderna, the grand-dam of the New Zealand/Australian champion Zabeel.

As a foal, Detroit was sold in a private deal for approximately £100,000 to Robert Sangster. The filly was sent into training with Olivier Douieb at Chantilly.

== Racing career ==
=== 1980: three-year-old season ===
Detroit did not race as a two-year-old, beginning her racing career with a five-length win in a maiden race over 2100 metres at Saint-Cloud Racecourse in May 1980. She was then moved up in class for the Group Three Prix de Fille de l'Air over the same course and distance on 21 June. Ridden by Alain Lequeux, she started the 2.1/1 favourite and won by two and a half lengths from Gold River. On 19 July, the filly started the 1.4/1 favourite for the Group Three Prix Chloé over 1800 m at Evry Racecourse and won by one and a half lengths from Licara. Detroit's next race was the Prix de la Nonette over 2000 m at Deauville Racecourse on 31 August. She started the 9/10 favourite and won by two lengths from India Song with the Prix de Malleret winner Luth de Saron in third place.

Pat Eddery took over from Lequeux for Detroit's next race, the Group One Prix Vermeille over 2400 m at Longchamp Racecourse on 14 September. She started the 11/4 favourite against a strong field which included Aryenne (Poule d'Essai des Pouliches), Mrs Penny (Prix de Diane), Cairn Rouge (Irish 1,000 Guineas) and Gold River. Detroit was unable to obtain a clear run until the closing stages, but then produced a strong late run to finish third, beaten half a length and three quarters of a length by Mrs Penny and the Irish-trained outsider Little Bonny. Many observers, including Timeform, considered Detroit to have been a very unlucky loser. On 5 October, Detroit was one of twenty horses to contest Europe's most prestigious weight-for-age race, the Prix de l'Arc de Triomphe over 2400 m at Longchamp. Ridden by Eddery, she started the 6.7/1 fourth choice in the betting behind the British four-year-old Ela-Mana-Mou, the French colt Le Marmot and the 1979 Arc winner Three Troikas. Unusually, the race was run on firm ground and the presence of several pacemakers ensured that the early pace was very fast. Eddery retrained the filly in the early stages before moving to the outside to make her challenge in the straight. Detroit made rapid progress, overtaking Ela-Mana-Mou and Three Troikas inside the last 200 m and holding the late run of Argument to win by half a length. The winning time of 2:28.0 was a new record for the race.

=== 1981: four-year-old season ===
Detroit's form in the early part of 1981 was disappointing. She finished fourth of the six runners behind Argument in the Prix d'Harcourt and fifth of nine behind the same horse in the Prix Ganay on 3 May. Detroit was off the course for sixteen weeks before returning to win a minor race over 2200 m at Clairefontaine in August. She then followed up by winning the Prix Ridgway at Deauville, beating Ruscelli by one and a half lengths. According to Timeform, she looked to be in much better condition than in spring, but wore bandages on her legs, suggesting injury problems. In September, Detroit started odds-on favourite for the Prix Foy over 2400 m at Longchamp. In a slowly run race, she accelerated clear of her three opponents early in the straight and was eased down in the closing stages to win by two lengths from Lancastrian, with Gold River in third place. On 4 October, Detroit started the 7/2 second favourite in her attempt to win a second Prix de l'Arc de Triomphe and was ridden by Freddy Head, who had opted to ride her in preference to Gold River. Detroit was well-placed in the early stages but dropped away in the straight and finished twentieth of the twenty-four runners behind Gold River. On her only subsequent appearance, Detroit finished fifth behind April Run in the Turf Classic at Aqueduct Race Track.

== Assessment ==
In 1980, Detroit was given a rating of 131 by the independent Timeform organisation, making her the highest-rated three-year-old filly of the year. She was also the top-rated three-year-old filly in the official International Classification, two pound ahead of Mrs Penny. Timeform awarded Detroit a rating of 126 in 1981. In the International Classification she was rated the second-best older female in Europe, seven pounds below Gold River.

In their book, A Century of Champions, based on the Timeform rating system, John Randall and Tony Morris rated Detroit an "inferior" winner of the Prix de l'Arc de Triomphe.

== Broodmare career ==
Detroit was retired from racing to become a broodmare for her owner's Swettenham Stud. She produced at least twelve foals between 1983 and 2001:

- Lake Erie (bay colt, foaled in 1983, sired by Kings Lake), won six races, including the St. Simon Stakes
- Nordic Legend (bay colt, 1985, by Northern Dancer), unraced
- Nocturnal Song (bay filly, 1986, by Northern Dancer), unraced
- Antisaar (bay colt, 1987, by Northern Dancer), won two races including Prix Guillaume d'Ornano
- Wayne County (bay colt, 1990, by Sadler's Wells), won four races
- Carnegie (bay colt, 1991, by Sadler's Wells), won seven races including Prix de l'Arc de Triomphe
- Honfleur (brown filly, 1992, by Sadler's Wells), won two races
- Mayenne (brown filly, 1994, by Nureyev), unraced. Female-line ancestor of Twilight Payment.
- Lamarque (bay filly, 1995, by Nureyev), unraced
- Valencay (bay filly, 1996, by Sadler's Wells), unraced
- Loire Valley (bay filly, 1998, by Sadler's Wells), unraced
- Mennetou (bay filly, 2001, by Entrepreneur), unraced

Detroit died shortly after the birth of her last foal on 20 May 2001 at the Swettenham Stud.

== Pedigree ==
Pedigree of Detroit (USA), brown mare, 1977
Sire Riverman (USA) 1969	Never Bend (USA); 1960	Nasrullah	Nearco
Sire Riverman (USA) 1969	Never Bend (USA); 1960	Nasrullah	Mumtaz Begum
Sire Riverman (USA) 1969	Never Bend (USA); 1960	Lalun	Djeddah
Sire Riverman (USA) 1969	Never Bend (USA); 1960	Lalun	Be Faithful
Sire Riverman (USA) 1969	River Lady (USA); 1963	Prince John	Princequillo
Sire Riverman (USA) 1969	River Lady (USA); 1963	Prince John	Not Afraid
Sire Riverman (USA) 1969	River Lady (USA); 1963	Nile Lily	Roman
Sire Riverman (USA) 1969	River Lady (USA); 1963	Nile Lily	Azalea
Dam Derna (FR) 1961	Sunny Boy (FR); 1944	Jock	Asterus
Dam Derna (FR) 1961	Sunny Boy (FR); 1944	Jock	Naic
Dam Derna (FR) 1961	Sunny Boy (FR); 1944	Fille de Soleil	Solario
Dam Derna (FR) 1961	Sunny Boy (FR); 1944	Fille de Soleil	Fille de Salut
Dam Derna (FR) 1961	Miss Barberie (FR); 1950	Norseman	Umidwar
Dam Derna (FR) 1961	Miss Barberie (FR); 1950	Norseman	Tara
Dam Derna (FR) 1961	Miss Barberie (FR); 1950	Vaneuse	Vatellor
Dam Derna (FR) 1961	Miss Barberie (FR); 1950	Vaneuse	Diseuse (Family 16-c)
