= Greville Starkey =

English jockey (1939–2010)

Personal information
- Born: 21 December 1939
- Died: 14 April 2010 (aged 70) Newmarket, Suffolk
- Occupation: Jockey

Horse racing career
- Sport: Horse racing
- Career wins: 1,989

Major racing wins
- British Classic Races: 2000 Guineas Stakes (1981, 1986); Derby Stakes (1978); Oaks Stakes (1964, 1978); Other major races: British Champions Sprint Stakes (1982, 1986); Champion Stakes (1978); Cheveley Park Stakes (1978); Coronation Stakes (1963, 1964); Diamond Jubilee Stakes (1982); Eclipse Stakes (1975, 1982, 1986); Gold Cup (1966, 1978, 1988); Goodwood Cup (1970, 1976, 1988); Irish 1,000 Guineas (1973); Irish Derby (1978); Irish Oaks (1978); King George VI and Queen Elizabeth Stakes (1982); Lockinge Stakes (1979); Nassau Stakes (1977, 1981, 1989); Nunthorpe Stakes (1979); Poule d'Essai des Poulains (1981, 1987); Preis der Diana (1972); Preis von Europa (1986); Prix de l'Arc de Triomphe (1975); Prix de la Forêt (1987); Prix du Moulin de Longchamp (1985); Prix Jean-Luc Lagardère (1980); Prix Jean Prat (1979); Prix Vermeille (1982); Queen Anne Stakes (1985); Queen Elizabeth II Stakes (1983); Sprint Cup (1982); St. James's Palace Stakes (1981); Sun Chariot Stakes (1977); Sussex Stakes (1985, 1987); Vertem Futurity Trophy (1983, 1985); Yorkshire Oaks (1964, 1978, 1986)

Significant horses
- Ahonoora, All Along, Alphabatim, Bakharoff, Cloonagh, Dancing Brave, Devon Ditty, Fair Salinia, Homeward Bound, Kalaglow, Recitation, Rousillon, Sadeem, Shangamuzo, Shirley Heights, Soviet Star, Star Appeal, Swiss Maid, To-Agori-Mou, Untold
- Updated on 28 January 2022

Greville Michael Wilson Starkey (21 December 1939 – 14 April 2010) was an English jockey who rode almost 2,000 winners during a 33-year career on the flat.

Starkey scaled the heights of his profession during his 33-year career in which he rode 1,989 winners on the Flat. He claimed a notable Classic double-double in 1978 when landing The Derby and Irish Derby on Shirley Heights and the Oaks and Irish Oaks on Fair Salinia. Other big races he won in this country included the Ascot Gold Cup (3 times), the King George VI & Queen Elizabeth Diamond Stakes, Eclipse Stakes (twice), Champion Stakes and Sussex Stakes.

As well as Classic success on Shirley Heights and Fair Salinia, Starkey landed the 1964 Oaks on Homeward Bound and the 2,000 Guineas on To-Agori-Mou in 1981 and Dancing Brave in 1986. He rode a century of winners on 4 occasions (1978, 1982, 1983 and 1986), each time finishing 4th in the flat jockeys table, with a personal best of 107 in 1978. Starkey was champion apprentice in 1957 and retired from racing at the end of the 1989 season.

== Death ==
Starkey died of cancer at the age of 70 at his home outside Newmarket on 14 April 2010. Although still married to Christine Starkey, they had separated and his partner at the time of his death was Julie Elliott.

He had two daughters with Christine, namely Helen and Anna Starkey.

His sister Mick Turner worked at The British Racing School in Newmarket, whilst Greville was racing.

== Races won ==
- 1964, 1978 Epsom Oaks
- 1965 Danish Derby riding Fonseca
- 1966, 1978, 1988 Ascot Gold Cup
- 1975 Prix de l'Arc de Triomphe riding Star Appeal
- 1975, 1982, 1986 Eclipse Stakes
- 1977 Sun Chariot Stakes
- 1978 Epsom Derby riding Shirley Heights
- 1978, 1987 Sagaro Stakes
- 1979, 1987 Palace House Stakes
- 1979 Lockinge Stakes riding Young Generation
- 1979 Musidora Stakes
- 1979 Diomed Stakes
- 1980 Prix Jean-Luc Lagardère
- 1980, 1981 Greenham Stakes
- 1981 Grosser Preis von Baden
- 1981, 1986 2,000 Guineas Stakes
- 1981, 1987 Poule d'Essai des Poulains
- 1982 King George VI and Queen Elizabeth Stakes
- 1982 Haydock Sprint Cup
- 1982 Prix Vermeille
- 1982 Earl of Sefton Stakes
- 1982, 1987 Gordon Richards Stakes
- 1982, 1989 Brigadier Gerard Stakes
- 1983 Sandown Classic Trial
- 1977, 1984, 1986 Craven Stakes
- 1985 Prix du Moulin de Longchamp
- 1985 John Porter Stakes
- 1985, 1987 Sussex Stakes
- 1986 Celebration Mile
- 1986 Preis von Europa
- 1986 Diadem Stakes
- 1986 Ebor Handicap
- 1986, 1987 Jockey Club Stakes
- 1987 Prix de la Forêt
- 1988 Goodwood Cup
- 1989 Nassau Stakes
- 1989 Henry II Stakes
- 1989 Lingfield Derby Trial
