= Cut Above =

British-bred Thoroughbred racehorse

- Sire: High Top
- Grandsire: Derring-Do
- Dam: Cutle
- Damsire: Saint Crespin
- Sex: Stallion
- Foaled: 19 April 1978
- Country: United Kingdom
- Colour: Bay
- Breeder: Jakie Astor
- Owner: Jakie Astor
- Trainer: Dick Hern
- Record: 7:2-2-2

Major wins
- White Rose Stakes (1981); St Leger Stakes (1981)

Honours
- Timeform rating 130 (1981)

Cut Above (19 April 1978 – ca. 1991) was a British Thoroughbred racehorse and sire best known for his upset win in the 1981 St Leger Stakes. As a two-year-old he showed useful form despite being beaten in both of his races and won the White Rose Stakes on his three-year-old debut. After recovering from a viral infection he finished second to Shergar in the Irish Derby and third to Ardross in the Geoffrey Freer Stakes. In the St Leger he started a 28/1 outsider but won from Glint of Gold and Bustomi with the odds-on Shergar in fourth. After being well-beaten in his only subsequent race he stood as a breeding stallion in Ireland and Brazil.

== Background ==
Cut Above was a bay horse with a white star bred by his owner Sir John Jacob "Jakie" Astor. He was sired by High Top, who won the 2000 Guineas in 1972 and later became a successful breeding stallion. His other progeny included the Oaks Stakes winner Circus Plume and the Prix du Jockey Club winner Top Ville. Cut Above's dam Cutle was descended from Felucca, the foundation mare of Dick Hollingsworth's stud whose other descendants included Bireme, Longboat, Bolas (Irish Oaks), Dash for Cash (Australian Guineas) and Daffodil (AJC Oaks). Cutle had previously produced Sharp Edge, a colt who won the Irish 2,000 Guineas and the Prix Jean Prat in 1973.

Astor sent his colt into training with Dick Hern at West Ilsley in Berkshire.

== Racing career ==
=== 1980: two-year-old season ===
Cut Above ran promisingly in two races a two-year-old. After finishing third on his debut he was moved up in class for the Group Three Horris Hill Stakes at Newbury where he finished second to the Guy Harwood-trained Kalaglow.

=== 1981: three-year-old season ===
Cut Above made his three-year-old debut in the White Rose Stakes over ten furlongs at Ascot Racecourse in April. Ridden by Willie Carson, he started the 10/11 favourite and won by one and a half lengths from Ridgefield, having taken the lead one and a half furlong from the finish.

In the late spring and early summer of 1981 many horses in the Dick Hern stable, including Cut Above, suffered from a viral infection and the trainer had very few runners. Cut Above returned from a two-month break and was given a most challenging task when he was matched against the Aga Khan's colt Shergar in the Irish Sweeps Derby at the Curragh on 27 June. Shergar had created an enormous impression when winning The Derby by a record ten lengths and started the 1/3 favourite, with Cut Above third in the betting on 14/1. Carson sent Cut Above into the lead from the start and maintained a narrow advantage until the turn into the straight when he was overtaken by Shergar. Although he never had any chance with the winner, who was given a very gentle ride by Lester Piggott, Cut Above stayed on well to finish second, four lengths behind the winner. At Newbury in August, Cut Above was moved up in distance and matched against older horses in the Geoffrey Freer Stakes over thirteen furlongs. He appeared to be unsuited by the slow pace and finished third of the four runners behind Ardross and Castle Keep.

On 12 September at Doncaster Racecourse, Cut Above was one of six colts to oppose Shergar in the 205th running of the St Leger. Since winning in Ireland, the Aga Khan's colt had recorded an emphatic four-length win over older horses in the King George VI and Queen Elizabeth Stakes and started the 4/9 favourite ahead of the Derby runner-up Glint of Gold. The best hope of the Hern stable appeared to be Bustomi, the winner of the King Edward VII Stakes and Gordon Stakes who was third in the betting on 13/2 while Cut Above, ridden by the veteran Joe Mercer started at odds of 28/1. Mercer settled the colt in the middle of the field and turned into the straight in fourth place behind Bustomi, Glint of Gold and Shergar. Two furlongs from the finish, Shergar began to struggle and dropped back as Mercer produced Cut Above with a strong run down the centre of the track. He overtook Glint of Gold a furlong out and won decisively by two and a half length with Bustomi four lengths back in third and Shergar another five lengths away in fourth. The win came sixteen years after Provoke, owned by Astor, trained by Hern and ridden by Mercer had beaten the odds-on Meadow Court in the 1965 St Leger in what was described as "one of the biggest upsets in British horse racing history". Three weeks after his classic victory, Cut Above was sent to France to contest the Prix de l'Arc de Triomphe over 2400 metres at Longchamp Racecourse. Ridden by Brian Taylor he started a 38/1 outsider and finished fourteenth of twenty-four runners, approximately seventeen lengths behind the winner Gold River.

== Assessment ==
Despite having been placed in a Group Three race, Cut Above was not rated in the 1980 Free Handicap, a rating of the season's best two-year-olds. In 1981 the official International Classification, rated Cut Above the third-best three-year-old colt in Europe, behind Shergar and Bikala, and the fifth best horse of any age. The independent Timeform organisation gave Cut Above a rating of 130, ten pounds below the top-rated Shergar. In their book A Century of Champions, John Randall and Tony Morris rated Cut Above an "inferior" St Leger winner.

== Stud record ==
Before the end of 1981, Cut Above was sold to Captain Tim Rogers for a sum of approximately £600,000. He was retired to Rogers' Airlie stud in Ireland, beginning his career as a breeding stallion at fee of IR£4,000. He stood in Ireland for four seasons with moderate results before being sold and exported to Brazil. His last reported foals were born in 1991.

== Pedigree ==
Pedigree of Cut Above (GB), bay stallion, 1978
| Sire High Top (IRE) 1969 | Derring-Do (GB); 1961 | Darius | Dante |
| Sire High Top (IRE) 1969 | Derring-Do (GB); 1961 | Darius | Yasna |
| Sire High Top (IRE) 1969 | Derring-Do (GB); 1961 | Sipsey Bridge | Abernant |
| Sire High Top (IRE) 1969 | Derring-Do (GB); 1961 | Sipsey Bridge | Claudette |
| Sire High Top (IRE) 1969 | Camenae (GB); 1961 | Vimy | Wild Risk |
| Sire High Top (IRE) 1969 | Camenae (GB); 1961 | Vimy | Mimi |
| Sire High Top (IRE) 1969 | Camenae (GB); 1961 | Madrilene | Court Martial |
| Sire High Top (IRE) 1969 | Camenae (GB); 1961 | Madrilene | Marmite |
| Dam Cutle (GB) 1963 | Saint Crespin (GB); 1956 | Aureole | Hyperion |
| Dam Cutle (GB) 1963 | Saint Crespin (GB); 1956 | Aureole | Angelola |
| Dam Cutle (GB) 1963 | Saint Crespin (GB); 1956 | Neocracy | Nearco |
| Dam Cutle (GB) 1963 | Saint Crespin (GB); 1956 | Neocracy | Harina |
| Dam Cutle (GB) 1963 | Cutter (GB); 1955 | Donatello | Blenheim |
| Dam Cutle (GB) 1963 | Cutter (GB); 1955 | Donatello | Delleana |
| Dam Cutle (GB) 1963 | Cutter (GB); 1955 | Felucca | Nearco |
| Dam Cutle (GB) 1963 | Cutter (GB); 1955 | Felucca | Felsetta (Family: 11-d) |

- Cut Above was inbred 4 × 4 to Nearco, meaning that this stallion appears twice in the fourth generation of his pedigree.
