= Northjet =

Irish-bred Thoroughbred racehorse

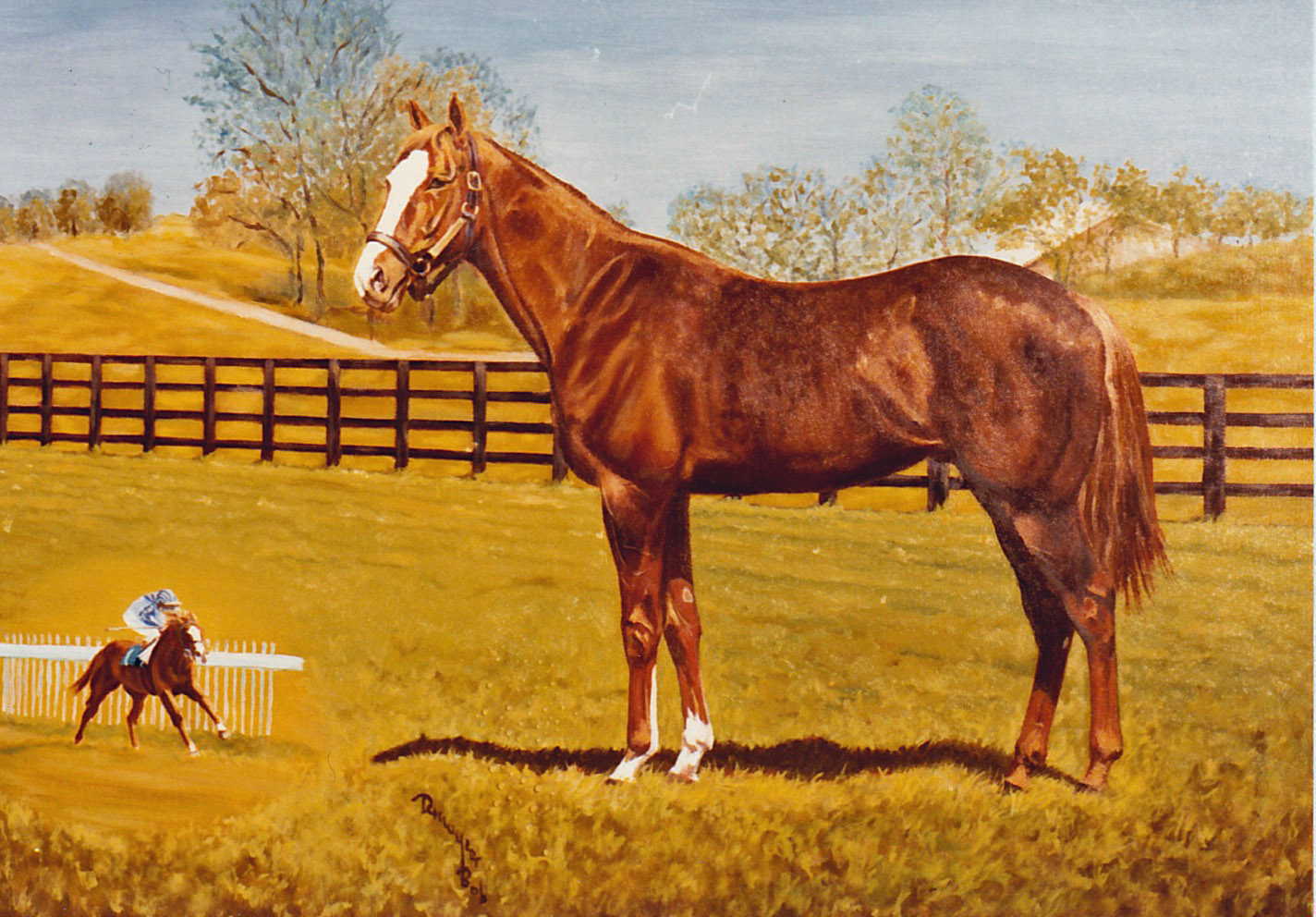
- Northjet, oil on canvas Painting by Bob Demuyser (1920–2003)
- Sire: Northfields
- Grandsire: Northern Dancer
- Dam: Jellatino
- Damsire: Fortino
- Sex: Stallion
- Foaled: 22 May 1977
- Country: Ireland
- Colour: Chestnut
- Owner: Serge Fradkoff
- Trainer: Lorenzo Brogi; Olivier Douieb
- Record: 18:8-3-3

Major wins
- Premio Melton (1980); Prix du Muguet (1981); Prix Jacques Le Marois (1981); Prix du Moulin (1981)

Awards
- Timeform top-rated miler (1981); Timeform top-rated older horse (1981); Top-rated European older horse (1981); Timeform rating: 120 (1980), 136 (1981)

Northjet (foaled 22 May 1977) was an Irish-bred, French-trained Thoroughbred racehorse and sire. He showed useful form in his early career, winning five races in Italy including the Group Two Premio Melton before being transferred to race in France in 1980. In early 1981 he won the Prix du Muguet but was beaten in several races and appeared to be just below the highest class. Northjet established his reputation in the late summer of 1981 when he recorded a five length victory over a very strong field in the Prix Jacques Le Marois and then won the Prix du Moulin in course record time. He was generally recognised as the best older horse and the best miler to race in Europe that season. He was then retired to stud where he was a complete failure as a breeding stallion.

== Background ==
Northjet was a chestnut horse with a broad white blaze and white socks on his front legs. He was sired by Northfields, an American horse whose biggest win came in the Louisiana Derby in 1971, before spending most of his stud career in Europe. His other winners included Northern Treasure, No Pass No Sale (Poule d'Essai des Poulains), North Stoke and Oats. Northjet's dam Jellatina was a daughter of the 1000 Guineas winner Queenpot, and had previously produced Madang who won the Premio Melton (twice) and the Prix du Gros Chêne.

As a foal, Northjet was sent to the Newmarket December Sales. He was sold for 24,000 guineas and sent to be trained in Italy by Lorenzo Brogi.

== Racing career ==
=== 1979 & 1980: early career ===
Northjet ran three times in Italy in 1979, winning one race over 1000 metres. In the following year, he won four consecutive races in Italy at distances ranging from 1000m to 1400m. On his final Italian start he won the Group Two over 1200m at Capannelle Racecourse in Rome, beating Marching On by one and a half lengths and setting a new track record of 1:08.8. In June, he was sent to England and finished unplaced behind Kearney in the Cork and Orrery Stakes at Royal Ascot. He was then sent to France to be trained by Olivier Douieb. He failed to win in his four remaining starts but showed some promising form. He finished second to Kilijaro in the Prix de Meautry at Deauville Racecourse in August, and third to the same filly in the Prix de Seine-et-Oise at Maisons-Laffitte Racecourse in October. In late 1980, Serge Fradkoff outbid a group of New Zealand breeders to buy Northjet for a sum reported to be in the region of $400,000.

=== 1981: four-year-old season ===
Northjet began his four-year-old season in the Prix de Ris-Orangis over 1600m at Evry Racecourse in April, in which he finished fifth behind Hilal. On 1 May, he won the Prix du Muguet over 1600m at Saint-Cloud Racecourse, beating Joberan by a neck. He then finished third behind Price Mab and Diamond Prospect when carrying top weight in the Prix du Palais-Royal over 1400m at Longchamp Racecourse. He was then moved up in distance for the Group One Prix d'Ispahan over 1900m at Longchamp on 4 July. Ridden by Freddy Head he started at odds of 10/1 and finished second of the ten runners, two length behind The Wonder. Northjet was next scheduled to run in the Sussex Stakes in Britain, but was ruled out on the eve of the race because of an abscess on his fetlock.

On 16 August at Deauville Racecourse, Northjet was one of eleven horses to contest the Group One Prix Jacques Le Marois over a straight 1600m. Ridden by Head, he started at odds of 7.3/1 against opponents including To-Agori-Mou (2000 Guineas), Kings Lake (Irish 2,000 Guineas, Sussex Stakes), Hilal, The Wonder, Cresta Rider (Prix Jean Prat) and Ukraine Girl (Poule d'Essai des Pouliches). Head tracked the leaders before moving up to join the leaders with 300m left to run. The colt then produced a "spectacular surge" to go clear of the field and won very easily by five lengths from To-Agori-Mou, who beat Kings Lake by a nose for second place. The winning time of 1:34.5 on firm ground was the second fastest time recorded over the course. Three weeks later, Northjet contested the Prix du Moulin over 1600m at Longchamp and started the 6/10 favourite against eleven opponents. Despite the presence of two pacemakers, Northjet pulled hard against Head's attempts to restrain him before moving into the lead early in the straight. He was unable to break clear of the field as he had at Deauville, but won decisively by one and a half lengths from Hilal and The Wonder in a course record time of 1:35.2. Northjet was scheduled to end his racing career in the Champion Stakes over ten furlongs at Newmarket Racecourse in October, but was withdrawn after contacting an infection a week before the race.

== Assessment ==
In 1980, the independent Timeform organisation gave Northjet a rating of 120, seventeen pounds behind their top-rated horse Moorestyle. In the following year he was rated 136 by Timeform, making him the top-rated Miler, the top-rated older horse and the second-best horse of the year, four pounds below Shergar. At the time, his rating was the second-highest ever awarded to older male trained in France after Exbury (138 in 1963). In the official International Classification he was also the top-rated older horse and the second-best horse of the year behind Shergar.

== Stud career ==
At the end of his racing career, Northjet was syndicated at $375,000 a share, giving him a theoretical value of $15 million and was sent to stand at the Airdrie Stud in Kentucky. He made no impact as a stallion and was sold several times for decreasing sums, finally being sold for $1,020 in February 1990.

== Pedigree ==
Pedigree of Northjet (USA), chestnut stallion, 1977
Sire Northfields (USA) 1968	Northern Dancer (CAN); 1961	Nearctic	Nearco
Sire Northfields (USA) 1968	Northern Dancer (CAN); 1961	Nearctic	Lady Angela
Sire Northfields (USA) 1968	Northern Dancer (CAN); 1961	Natalma	Native Dancer
Sire Northfields (USA) 1968	Northern Dancer (CAN); 1961	Natalma	Almahmoud
Sire Northfields (USA) 1968	Little Hut (USA); 1952	Occupy	Bull Dog
Sire Northfields (USA) 1968	Little Hut (USA); 1952	Occupy	Miss Bunting
Sire Northfields (USA) 1968	Little Hut (USA); 1952	Savage Beauty	Challenger
Sire Northfields (USA) 1968	Little Hut (USA); 1952	Savage Beauty	Khara
Dam Jellatina (IRE) 1966	Fortino(FR); 1959	Grey Sovereign	Nasrullah
Dam Jellatina (IRE) 1966	Fortino(FR); 1959	Grey Sovereign	Kong
Dam Jellatina (IRE) 1966	Fortino(FR); 1959	Ranavalo	Relic
Dam Jellatina (IRE) 1966	Fortino(FR); 1959	Ranavalo	Navarra
Dam Jellatina (IRE) 1966	Queenpot (GB); 1945	Big Game	Bahram
Dam Jellatina (IRE) 1966	Queenpot (GB); 1945	Big Game	Myrobella
Dam Jellatina (IRE) 1966	Queenpot (GB); 1945	Poker Chip	The Recorder
Dam Jellatina (IRE) 1966	Queenpot (GB); 1945	Poker Chip	Straight Sequence (Family 22)
