= Storm Bird =

Canadian-bred Thoroughbred racehorse (1978–2004)

- Sire: Northern Dancer
- Grandsire: Nearctic
- Dam: South Ocean
- Damsire: New Providence
- Sex: Stallion
- Foaled: 19 April 1978
- Country: Canada
- Colour: Bay
- Breeder: Windfields Farm
- Owner: Robert Sangster
- Trainer: Vincent O'Brien
- Record: 6: 5-0-0
- Earnings: $168,891

Major wins
- Anglesey Stakes (1980); National Stakes (1980); Larkspur Stakes (1980); Dewhurst Stakes (1980)

Awards
- Top-rated European two-year-old (1980); Timeform top-rated two-year-old (1980); Timeform rating: 134
- Last updated on 16 November 2026

Storm Bird (19 April 1978 – 3 December 2004) was a Canadian-bred, Irish-trained Thoroughbred racehorse and sire. He was the outstanding European two-year-old of 1980, when he was unbeaten in five races, including the Anglesey Stakes, National Stakes and Dewhurst Stakes. His subsequent career was disrupted by injury and illness, and he was well beaten in his only race of 1981. He was then retired to stud, where he became a very successful breeding stallion.

== Background ==
Storm Bird was a bay horse with a white star and snip and two white socks bred in Canada by Windfields Farm. He was one of many important winners sired by Northern Dancer, who won the Kentucky Derby in 1964 before becoming one of the most successful breeding stallions in Thoroughbred history. His dam, South Ocean, had previously produced Northernette (also sired by Northern Dancer), the champion filly of her generation in Canada at two and three years of age. The colt was sent to race in Europe and was trained by Vincent O'Brien at Ballydoyle, County Tipperary.

== Racing career ==
On his racecourse debut, Storm Bird started 2/5 favourite for a 19-runner maiden race over six furlongs at the Curragh in July. He was bumped by one of his opponents at the start, but recovered to win by six lengths. The colt was then moved up in class for the Group Three Anglesey Stakes at the same course in August. He took the lead two furlongs from the finish, but appeared to idle in front and won by only half a length from Prince Echo. The form of the race was boosted when Prince Echo won the Champagne Stakes at Doncaster in September. Two weeks after his win in the Anglesey Stakes, Storm Bird moved up in distance to contest the seven-furlong National Stakes, Ireland's most valuable race for two-year-olds. Ridden by Tommy Murphy, he started the 2/5 favourite and won easily, taking the lead two furlongs from the finish and beating Master Thatch by four lengths.

In the Larkspur Stakes at Leopardstown Racecourse in September Storm Bird, ridden by Steve Cauthen, was required to concede weight to his five opponents but won easily, beating Band Practice by four length. On his final appearance of the season, Storm Bird was sent to contest Britain's most prestigious two-year-old race, the Dewhurst Stakes over seven furlongs at Newmarket Racecourse. He was opposed by a strong field, including Miswaki, Kirtling (Chesham Stakes) and To-Agori-Mou. Ridden by Pat Eddery, he started the 4/5 favourite in a race run in cold, wet and windy conditions Storm Bird and To-Agori-Mou drew well clear of the field, with Storm Bird prevailing by half a length.

Storm Bird had no success as a three-year-old. In early spring, he was attacked in his stable by a former stable lad, who cut off the hair from the horse's mane and tail. The colt appeared to be otherwise unharmed, but then sustained an injury to his hind leg and then developed a respiratory infection which ruled him out of the 2000 Guineas and Derby. It was then announced that the horse would be aimed at the Prix de l'Arc de Triomphe at Longchamp Racecourse in October, and he was heavily backed for the race after reports that he had easily beaten Kings Lake in a training gallop at Ballydoyle. He finally reappeared in the Prix du Prince d'Orange at Longchamp in September but ran very poorly to finish seventh of the nine runners behind Vayrann.

== Assessment ==
In 1980, Storm Bird was the highest-rated European two-year-old on the official International Classification, one pound ahead of To-Agori-Mou. The independent Timeform organisation rated him at 134. In their book A Century of Champions, John Randall and Tony Morris rated Storm Bird the 27th best two-year-old trained in Britain or Ireland in the 20th century.

== Stud record ==
Retired to stand at stud at Ashford Stud in Versailles, Kentucky, Storm Bird sired 63 stakes winners, including Summer Squall, Storm Cat, Balanchine, Indian Skimmer and Bluebird. Also, Storm Bird was the broodmare sire of winners of more than 100 stakes races, including Kentucky Derby winner Thunder Gulch, Belmont Stakes winner Birdstone and the speedy gelding Commentator.

Pensioned from stud duties in 1999, Storm Bird had to be euthanised on 3 December 2004, after suffering from colic.

== Pedigree ==
Pedigree of Storm Bird (CAN), bay stallion, 1978
Sire Northern Dancer (CAN) 1961	Nearctic (CAN); 1954	Nearco	Pharos
Sire Northern Dancer (CAN) 1961	Nearctic (CAN); 1954	Nearco	Nogara
Sire Northern Dancer (CAN) 1961	Nearctic (CAN); 1954	Lady Angela	Hyperion
Sire Northern Dancer (CAN) 1961	Nearctic (CAN); 1954	Lady Angela	Sister Sarah
Sire Northern Dancer (CAN) 1961	Natalma (USA); 1957	Native Dancer	Polynesian
Sire Northern Dancer (CAN) 1961	Natalma (USA); 1957	Native Dancer	Geisha
Sire Northern Dancer (CAN) 1961	Natalma (USA); 1957	Almahmoud	Mahmoud
Sire Northern Dancer (CAN) 1961	Natalma (USA); 1957	Almahmoud	Arbitrator
Dam South Ocean (CAN) 1967	New Providence (CAN); 1956	Bull Page	Bull Lea
Dam South Ocean (CAN) 1967	New Providence (CAN); 1956	Bull Page	Our Page
Dam South Ocean (CAN) 1967	New Providence (CAN); 1956	Fair Colleen	Preciptic
Dam South Ocean (CAN) 1967	New Providence (CAN); 1956	Fair Colleen	Fairvale
Dam South Ocean (CAN) 1967	Shining Sun (CAN); 1962	Chop Chop	Flares
Dam South Ocean (CAN) 1967	Shining Sun (CAN); 1962	Chop Chop	Sceptical
Dam South Ocean (CAN) 1967	Shining Sun (CAN); 1962	Solar Display	Sun Again
Dam South Ocean (CAN) 1967	Shining Sun (CAN); 1962	Solar Display	Dark Display (Family 4-j)
