= 1986 Epsom Derby =

- Derby
- Location: Epsom Downs Racecourse
- Date: 4 June 1986
- Winning horse: Shahrastani
- Starting price: 11 / 2
- Jockey: Walter Swinburn
- Trainer: Michael Stoute
- Owner: Aga Khan IV

Epsom Derby 1986
1-2-3
Shahrastani	Dancing Brave	Mashkour

Also Ran
4-5-6
Faraway Dancer	Nisnas	Flash of Steel
7-8-9
Sirk	Sharrood	Mr John
10-11-12
Allez Milord	Nomrood	Jareer
13-14-15
Then Again	Arokar	Bold Arrangement
16-17
Fioravanti	Wise Counsellor	17 Ran

The 1986 Epsom Derby was a horse race which took place at Epsom Downs on Wednesday 4 June 1986. It was the 207th running of the Derby, and it was won by Shahrastani. The winner was ridden by Walter Swinburn and trained by Michael Stoute. The prerace favourite Dancing Brave finished second.

== Race details ==
- Sponsor: Ever Ready
- Winner's prize money: £239,260
- Going: Good
- Number of runners: 17
- Winner's time: 2m 37.13s

== Full result ==
	*	Horse	Jockey	Trainer ^{†}	SP
1		Shahrastani	Walter Swinburn	Michael Stoute	11/2
2	½	Dancing Brave	Greville Starkey	Guy Harwood	2/1 fav
3	2½	Mashkour	Steve Cauthen	Henry Cecil	12/1
4	hd	Faraway Dancer	Willie Ryan	Henry Cecil	33/1
5	shd	Nisnas	Philip Waldron	Paul Cole	40/1
6	¾	Flash of Steel	Michael Kinane	Dermot Weld (IRE)	25/1
7	¾	Sirk	Philip Robinson	Clive Brittain	50/1
8	1	Sharrood	Willie Carson	Dick Hern	25/1
9	hd	Mr John	Tony Ives	Liam Browne (IRE)	50/1
10	½	Allez Milord	Cash Asmussen	Guy Harwood	8/1
11	hd	Nomrood	Richard Quinn	Paul Cole	20/1
12	1	Jareer	Brian Rouse	Michael Stoute	16/1
13	3	Then Again	Rae Guest	Luca Cumani	33/1
14	2½	Bold Arrangement	Chris McCarron	Clive Brittain	12/1
15	shd	Arokar	Yves Saint-Martin	Jacques de Chevigny (FR)	18/1
16	10	Fioravanti	Christy Roche	David O'Brien (IRE)	33/1
PU		Wise Counsellor	Pat Eddery	Vincent O'Brien (IRE)	16/1

- The distances between the horses are shown in lengths or shorter. shd = short-head; hd = head; PU = pulled up.
  † Trainers are based in Great Britain unless indicated.

== Winner's details ==
Further details of the winner, Shahrastani:

- Foaled: 27 March 1983, in Kentucky, USA
- Sire: Nijinsky; Dam: Shademah (Thatch)
- Owner: HH Aga Khan IV
- Breeder: HH Aga Khan IV
- Rating in 1986 International Classifications: 134

== Form analysis ==
=== Two-year-old races ===
Notable runs by the future Derby participants as two-year-olds in 1985.

- Shahrastani – 2nd Haynes, Hanson and Clark Stakes
- Mashkour – 1st Chromacopy Stakes
- Nisnas – 4th Somerville Tattersall Stakes
- Flash of Steel – 1st Beresford Stakes
- Sirk – 2nd Chromacopy Stakes
- Nomrood – 2nd Futurity Stakes (finished 3rd, placed 2nd)
- Jareer – 8th Dewhurst Stakes
- Bold Arrangement – 4th Richmond Stakes, 2nd Seaton Delaval Stakes, 1st Solario Stakes, 3rd Prix de la Salamandre, 2nd Grand Critérium, 4th Futurity Stakes (finished 2nd, placed 4th)
- Arokar – 1st Prix Saint-Roman

=== The road to Epsom ===
Early-season appearances in 1986 and trial races prior to running in the Derby.

- Shahrastani – 1st Sandown Classic Trial, 1st Dante Stakes
- Dancing Brave – 1st Craven Stakes, 1st 2,000 Guineas
- Mashkour – 3rd Craven Stakes, 1st White Rose Stakes, 1st Lingfield Derby Trial
- Faraway Dancer – 2nd Craven Stakes, 1st Dee Stakes
- Nisnas – 3rd White Rose Stakes
- Flash of Steel – 1st Tetrarch Stakes, 1st Irish 2,000 Guineas
- Sirk – 3rd Sandown Classic Trial, 2nd Chester Vase, 3rd Dante Stakes
- Sharrood – 7th Craven Stakes, 4th 2,000 Guineas, 3rd Irish 2,000 Guineas
- Mr John – 4th Tetrarch Stakes, 1st Amethyst Stakes, 2nd Irish 2,000 Guineas
- Allez Milord – 1st Predominate Stakes
- Nomrood – 1st Chester Vase, 2nd Dante Stakes
- Bold Arrangement – 3rd Doncaster Mile, 3rd Blue Grass Stakes, 2nd Kentucky Derby
- Arokar – 1st Prix Greffulhe, 2nd Prix Lupin
- Fioravanti – 5th Irish 2,000 Guineas
- Wise Counsellor – 2nd Derrinstown Stud Derby Trial

=== Subsequent Group 1 wins ===
Group 1 / Grade I victories after running in the Derby.

- Shahrastani – Irish Derby (1986)
- Dancing Brave – Eclipse Stakes (1986), King George VI and Queen Elizabeth Stakes (1986), Prix de l'Arc de Triomphe (1986)
- Mashkour – San Juan Capistrano Invitational Handicap (1991)
- Allez Milord – Preis von Europa (1986), Oak Tree Invitational Stakes (1987)

== Subsequent breeding careers ==
Leading progeny of participants in the 1986 Epsom Derby.

=== Sires of Classic winners ===
Dancing Brave (2nd)

- Commander In Chief - 1st Epsom Derby (1993), 1st Irish Derby (1993)
- Wemyss Bight - 1st Irish Oaks (1993)
- White Muzzle - 1st Derby Italiano (1993)
- Kyoei March - 1st Oka Sho (1997)
- T M Ocean - 1st Oka Sho (2001)

=== Sires of National Hunt horses ===
Shahrastani (1st)

- Zabadi - 1st Gerry Feilden Hurdle (1996)
- Padashpan - 1st Morgiana Hurdle (1993)
- Balanak - 1st Dovecote Novices' Hurdle (1995)
- Dariyoun - 3rd Prix du Cadran (1992)

Arokar (15th)

- Topkar - 1st Prix Amadou (1994) - Dam of Top Ling and Top World
- Ytalsa Royale - 1st Prix Ferdinand Dufaure (1995)

=== Other Stallions ===
Sharrood (8th) - Grey Shot (1st Goodwood Cup 1996, 1st Kingwell Hurdle 1999), Biwa Hayahide (1st Kikuka-shō 1993), Rambling Bear (1st Palace House Stakes 1999), Merrily (Dam of Dick Turpin)
Jareer (12th) - Sagar Pride (3rd Poule d'Essai des Pouliches 1996)
Allez Milord (10th) - Exported to Japan - Meisho Motonar (2nd February Stakes 1998)
Nomrood (11th) - Exported to Australia - Beaux Art (3rd Caulfield Cup 1995)
Then Again (13th) - For The Present (1st Steward's Cup 1994)
Bold Arrangement (14th) - Tom Tun (1st Wentworth Stakes 2002)
Fioravanti (16th) - Wixon (1st Prix du Petit Couvert 1992)
Wise Counsellor (Pulled up) - Exported to Japan - Damsire of Trot Star
Flash Of Steel (6th) - Sired minor flat and jumps winners - Exported to Italy - Exported to Australia - Exported to Japan
Sirk (7th) - Damsire of Easter Day
Mashkour (3rd) - Exported to Chile
Faraway Dancer (4th) - Exported to South Africa
Nisnas (5th) - Exported to Saudi Arabia
