= Tarascon (horse) =

Irish-bred Thoroughbred racehorse

- Sire: Tirol
- Grandsire: Thatching
- Dam: Breyani
- Damsire: Commanche Run
- Sex: Mare
- Foaled: 12 February 1995
- Country: Ireland
- Colour: Bay
- Breeder: Barronstown Stud, Ron Con Ltd and Mrs T Stack
- Owner: Jane Rowlinson
- Trainer: Tommy Stack
- Record: 9:3-0-1
- Earnings: £167,107

Major wins
- Moyglare Stud Stakes (1997); Irish 1,000 Guineas (1998)

Tarascon (foaled 12 February 1995) was an Irish Thoroughbred racehorse and broodmare. As a two-year-old in 1997 she was one of the leading fillies of her generation in Ireland winning two of her four races including the Moyglare Stud Stakes. In the following season she became rather temperamental and ran poorly in the 1000 Guineas and the Oaks Stakes, but produced her best form to win the Irish 1,000 Guineas. She retired after winning three of her nine races and had some success as a broodmare.

== Background ==
Tarascon was a bay mare bred in Ireland by Barronstown Stud, Ron Con Ltd and Mrs T Stack. She was one of the best horses sired by Tirol, an Irish-bred, British-trained stallion who won the 2000 Guineas and the Irish 2,000 Guineas in 1990. Her dam Breyani, won three minor races and also produced Mister Monet, whose wins included the Prix Guillaume d'Ornano and the Rose of Lancaster Stakes. Throughout her racing career, Tarascon was owned by Jane Rowlinson and trained at Golden, County Tipperary by Tommy Stack.

== Racing career ==
=== 1997: two-year-old season ===
As a two-year-old, Tarascon was ridden in all of her races by Pat Smullen. She made her racecourse debut in a six furlong maiden race at the Curragh on 13 July when she finished third of the eight runners, making good progress in the closing stages. Thirteen days later she reappeared in a race over seven furlongs at the same course and started 4/1 second favourite in a field of eight. She moved up on the outside with a quarter of a mile left to run and won by half a length from the favourite Saratoga Springs a colt trained by Aidan O'Brien. Tarascon was then moved up sharply in class for the Group One Phoenix Stakes over six furlongs at Leopardstown Racecourse in which she was again matched against colts. She tracked the leaders but was unable to make any significant progress in the closing stages and finished fifth behind the British-trained colt Princely Heir. On 7 September, the filly returned to competing against her own sex in the Group One Moyglare Stud Stakes at the Curragh. Smullen ettled the filly behind the leaders before moving up into second place with a quarter of a mile left to run. In the final strides she overtook the leader Heed My Warning and won by a head at odds of 7/1, with the future Epsom Oaks winner Shahtoush in third. Tarascon did not race again in 1997, but the value of her form was boosted when Saratoga Springs won the Group One Racing Post Trophy at Doncaster Racecourse in October.

=== 1998: three-year-old season ===
Tarascon's first appearance of her second season was the classic 1000 Guineas over the Rowley mile course at Newmarket Racecourse on 3 May. Her chances were somewhat compromised as she became frightened when being unloaded from the plane to England at Stansted Airport and sustained a minor leg injury. The filly became agitated in the starting stalls at Newmarket and ran very poorly, finishing a distant last of the sixteen runners behind Cape Verdi. After this race Jamie Spencer, then a seventeen-year-old apprentice jockey, replaced Smullen as the filly's regular jockey. Three weeks after her defeat at Newmarket, Tarascon started at odds of 12/1 for the Irish 1000 Guineas at the Curragh where she again gave trouble at the start, with four stalls handlers required to force her into the stalls. Spencer settled the filly behind the leaders before switching to the outside with two and a half furlongs left to run. She was still in fifth place entering the final furlong but stayed on strongly in the closing stages to take the lead in the final strides and win by a neck from Kitza, with the Saeed bin Suroor-trained favourite La Nuite Rose two lengths back in third. After the race, Stack revealed that he had deliberately downplayed the significance of the event to the young jockey, telling him that it was "just an ordinary race and if she runs bad, there is no panic, there isn't any pressure".

Tarascon was sent back to England and moved up in distance to contest the Epsom Oaks over one and a half miles on 5 June. She was held up by Spencer in the early stages but began to struggle with two furlong to run and weakened in the closing stages to finish sixth of the eight runners, fourteen lengths behind the winner Shahtoush. Tarascon was brought back to a mile for the Group One Sussex Stakes at Goodwood Racecourse on 29 July, but, racing against colts and older horses, she made no impression and finished seventh of the ten runners behind Among Men. The filly's final start was the Irish Champion Stakes over ten furlongs at Leopardstown on 12 September. She made little impact in a strong field, finishing fifth behind Swain, Alborada, Xaar and One So Wonderful.

== Breeding career ==
Tarascon was retired from racing to become a broodmare. She has produced at least eight foals and five winners:

- Beucaire, (bay filly, foaled in 2000, sired by Entrepreneur) won two races
- Perfecto, (bay filly, 2001, by Peintre Celebre) won one race
- Mayano Sophia, (filly, 2004, by Rock of Gibraltar) won two races
- Taras Wells (filly, 2005, by Sadler's Wells)
- Estephe, (bay filly, 2006, by Sadler's Wells) won one race
- High Award, (bay colt 2008, by Holy Roman Emperor) won two races including the Woodcote Stakes
- Skyphos (bay colt 2009, by Galileo) unplaced in only race
- Meiner Altero (bay colt 2011, by Holy Roman Emperor)

== Pedigree ==
Pedigree of Tarascon (IRE), bay filly, 1995
Sire Tirol (IRE) 1987	Thatching (IRE); 1975	Thatch	Forli
Sire Tirol (IRE) 1987	Thatching (IRE); 1975	Thatch	Thong
Sire Tirol (IRE) 1987	Thatching (IRE); 1975	Abella	Abernant
Sire Tirol (IRE) 1987	Thatching (IRE); 1975	Abella	Darrica
Sire Tirol (IRE) 1987	Alpine Niece (GB); 1972	Great Nephew	Honeyway
Sire Tirol (IRE) 1987	Alpine Niece (GB); 1972	Great Nephew	Sybil's Niece
Sire Tirol (IRE) 1987	Alpine Niece (GB); 1972	Fragrant Morn	Mourne
Sire Tirol (IRE) 1987	Alpine Niece (GB); 1972	Fragrant Morn	Alpine Scent
Dam Breyani (IRE) 1987	Commanche Run (GB); 1981	Run the Gantlet	Tom Rolfe
Dam Breyani (IRE) 1987	Commanche Run (GB); 1981	Run the Gantlet	First Feather
Dam Breyani (IRE) 1987	Commanche Run (GB); 1981	Volley	Ratification
Dam Breyani (IRE) 1987	Commanche Run (GB); 1981	Volley	Mitrailleuse
Dam Breyani (IRE) 1987	Molokai (IRE); 1980	Prince Tenderfoot	Blue Prince
Dam Breyani (IRE) 1987	Molokai (IRE); 1980	Prince Tenderfoot	La Tendresse
Dam Breyani (IRE) 1987	Molokai (IRE); 1980	Cake	Never Say Die
Dam Breyani (IRE) 1987	Molokai (IRE); 1980	Cake	La Marseillaise (Family 13-e)
