= Horris Hill Stakes =

Flat horse race in Britain

- Class: Group 3
- Location: Newbury Racecourse; Newbury, England
- Inaugurated: 1949
- Race type: Flat / Thoroughbred
- Sponsor: BetVictor
- Website: Newbury

Race information
- Distance: 7f (1,408 metres)
- Surface: Turf
- Track: Straight
- Qualification: Two-year-old colts and geldings
- Weight: 9 st 2 lb Penalties; 5 lb for G1/G2 winners 3 lb for Group 3 winners
- Purse: £55,000 (2025); 1st: £31,191

Horris Hill Stakes
2026
Bengal Tiger	Lex Victoria	Mezzo Forte

Previous years
2025
Time To Turn	Arabian Desert	Wechaad
2024
Make You Smile	Yaroogh	Star Anthem
2023
Orne	Witness Stand	Son Of Man
2022
Knight	Grey's Monument	Ancestral Land
2021
Light Infantry	Cresta	Tacarib Bay

2020-2011
2020
Mujbar	Percy's Lad	Saint Lawrence
2019
Kenzai Warrior	Ropey Guest	Impressor
2018
Mohaather	Azano	Almufti
2017
Nebo	Tangled	Mythical Magic
2016
Pleaseletmewin	Kings Gift	Law And Order
2015
Crazy Horse	Start Time	Return Of The Mak
2014
Smaih	Fox Trotter	King of Normandy
2013
Piping Rock	Galiway	Day Of Conquest
2012
Tawhid	Alhebayeb	Boomshackerlacker
2011
Tell Dad	Saigon	Hazaz

2010-2001
2010
Klammer	Dux Scholar	Elzaam
2009
Carnaby Street	Pleasant Day	Audacity Of Hope
2008
Evasive	Bonnie Charlie	Aahaykid
2007
Beacon Lodge	Stimulation	Iguazu Falls
2006
Dijeerr	Mythical Kid	Striving Storm
2005
Hurricane Cat	Final Verse	Araafa
2004
Cupid's Glory	Johnny Jumpup	King Marju
2003
Peak To Creek	Josephus	Millbag
2002
Makhlab	Shane	Wizard Of Noz
2001
Rapscallion	Samhari	Advance Party

2000-1991
2000
Clearing	Prizeman	Frenchmans Bay
1999
Umistim	Cape Town	Zyz
1998
Brancaster	Sicnee	Cobourg Lodge
1997
La-Faah	Sensory	Victory Note
1996
Desert Story	Royal Amaretto	Hidden Meadow
1995
Tumbleweed Ridge	Busy Flight	Brandon Magic
1994
Painter's Row	Bishop Of Cashel	Be Mindful
1993
Tatami	The Deep	Erhaab
1992
Beggarman Thief	Bin Ajwaad	Port Lucaya
1991
Lion Cavern	Autocracy	Muharib

1990-1988
1990
Sapieha	Red Rainbow	Regal Sabre
1989
Tirol	Robellation	Missionary Ridge
1988
Gouriev	Always Valiant	Annaf

The Horris Hill Stakes is a Group 3 flat horse race in Great Britain open to two-year-old thoroughbred colts and geldings. It is run at Newbury over a distance of 7 furlongs (1,408 metres), and it is scheduled to take place each year in October.

== History ==
The event is named after Horris Hill, an area located to the south of the racecourse. It was established in 1949, and was originally open to horses of either gender. The first running was won by a filly called Lone Victress.

The present system of race grading was introduced in 1971, and the Horris Hill Stakes was initially given Group 2 status. It was later relegated to Group 3 level.

The race was restricted to male horses in 1987. For a period it was held on Newbury's left-handed course, with a distance of about 7 furlongs and 64 yards. It was switched to the slightly shorter straight track in 2000.

The Horris Hill Stakes is part of the venue's last flat racing fixture of the year. From 2012 to 2016 the race was run under various titles incorporating Worthington's name along with a charity, and in 2017 it was sponsored by Bathwick Tyres and run as the Bathwick Tyres Stakes. From 2018 to 2020 it was sponsored by the Molson Beverage Company and run under sponsored titles.

== Records ==
Leading jockey (6 wins):

- Pat Eddery – Corby (1974), State Occasion (1975), Montekin (1981), Naheez (1986), Tirol (1989), Peak to Creek (2003)

Leading trainer (4 wins):

- Richard Hannon Sr. – Tirol (1989), Umistim (1999), Carnaby Street (2009), Tell Dad (2011), Piping Rock (2013)

== Winners ==
Year	Winner	Jockey	Trainer	Time
1949	Lone Victress	Thomas Hawcroft	Walter Nightingall	1:32.20
1950	Supreme Court	Charlie Elliott	Evan Williams	1:32.60
1951	H.V.C.	Tommy Gosling	Ron Smyth	1:30.80
1952	Baldaquin	Harry Carr	Ivor Anthony	1:39.00
1953	Court Splendour	Gordon Richards	Noel Murless	1:31.20
1954	Royal Palm	Scobie Breasley	Sam Armstrong	1:33.40
1955	Clarification	Bill Rickaby	Vic Smyth	1:34.60
1956	Persuader	Eph Smith	Humphrey Cottrill	1:34.80
1957	Alcide	Harry Carr	Cecil Boyd-Rochfort	1:35.80
1958	Seascape	Eph Smith	Ted Leader	1:36.40
1959	Ironic	Harry Carr	Derrick Candy	1:33.80
1960	Gallant Knight	Eph Smith	Ted Leader	1:38.80
1961	Valentine	Doug Smith	Geoffrey Brooke	1:35.20
1962	Scholar Gypsy	Ron Hutchinson	Ryan Jarvis	1:38.80
1963	Atbara	Scobie Breasley	Sir Gordon Richards	1:38.40
1964	Foothill	Joe Mercer	Dick Hern	1:35.20
1965	Charlottown	Jimmy Lindley	Towser Gosden	1:33.40
1966	Alcan	Bruce Raymond	Humphrey Cottrill	1:39.40
1967	Dalry	Roger Poincelet	Paddy Prendergast	1:40.00
1968	Sentier	Scobie Breasley	Ken Cundell	1:37.40
1969	Double First	Jimmy Lindley	Jeremy Tree	1:34.60
1970	Good Bond	Tony Murray	Ryan Price	1:32.98
1971	Disguise	Lester Piggott	Barry Hills	1:34.19
1972	Long Row	Eric Eldin	Ryan Jarvis	1:33.83
1973	Welsh Harmony	Eric Eldin	Doug Smith	1:34.23
1974	Corby	Pat Eddery	Peter Walwyn	1:38.74
1975	State Occasion	Pat Eddery	Peter Walwyn	1:33.62
1976	Fair Season	Greville Starkey	Ian Balding	1:39.33
1977 (dh)	Derrylin; Persian Bold	Eric Eldin; Lester Piggott	Doug Smith; Tony Ingham	1:36.44
1978	Kris	Joe Mercer	Henry Cecil	1:29.64
1979	Super Asset	Joe Mercer	Henry Cecil	1:35.36
1980	Kalaglow	Greville Starkey	Guy Harwood	1:35.46
1981	Montekin	Pat Eddery	John Dunlop	1:35.42
1982	Abandoned due to waterlogging
1983	Elegant Air	Steve Cauthen	Ian Balding	1:34.24
1984	Efisio	Willie Carson	John Dunlop	1:37.61
1985	Celtic Heir	Willie Ryan	Gavin Pritchard-Gordon	1:32.36
1986	Naheez	Pat Eddery	David Elsworth	1:35.69
1987	Glacial Storm	Cash Asmussen	Barry Hills	1:36.07
1988	Gouriev	Michael Roberts	Peter Makin	1:37.01
1989	Tirol	Pat Eddery	Richard Hannon Sr.	1:32.79
1990	Sapieha	Walter Swinburn	James Fanshawe	1:32.13
1991	Lion Cavern	Steve Cauthen	André Fabre	1:31.46
1992	Beggarman Thief	Ray Cochrane	John Gosden	1:35.24
1993	Tatami	Michael Roberts	Luca Cumani	1:35.63
1994	Painter's Row	John Reid	Peter Chapple-Hyam	1:32.98
1995	Tumbleweed Ridge	Brett Doyle	Brian Meehan	1:34.74
1996	Desert Story	John Reid	Michael Stoute	1:31.57
1997	La-Faah	Richard Hills	Barry Hills	1:32.06
1998	Brancaster	Kieren Fallon	Peter Chapple-Hyam	1:37.97
1999	Umistim	Dane O'Neill	Richard Hannon Sr.	1:32.47
2000	Clearing	Jimmy Fortune	John Gosden	1:29.02
2001	Rapscallion	Jason Tate	James Eustace	1:38.02
2002	Makhlab	Richard Hills	Barry Hills	1:31.11
2003	Peak to Creek	Pat Eddery	Jeremy Noseda	1:26.73
2004	Cupid's Glory	Seb Sanders	Sir Mark Prescott	1:28.95
2005	Hurricane Cat	Colm O'Donoghue	Aidan O'Brien	1:27.93
2006	Dijeerr	Philip Robinson	Michael Jarvis	1:30.66
2007	Beacon Lodge	Adam Kirby	Clive Cox	1:29.27
2008	Evasive	Christophe Soumillon	Sir Michael Stoute	1:31.69
2009	Carnaby Street	Jimmy Fortune	Richard Hannon Sr.	1:29.96
2010	Klammer	Jamie Spencer	Jane Chapple-Hyam	1:28.21
2011	Tell Dad	Eddie Ahern	Richard Hannon Sr.	1:23.80
2012	Tawhid	Jim Crowley	Saeed bin Suroor	1:29.64
2013	Piping Rock	Pat Dobbs	Richard Hannon Sr.	1:30.84
2014	Smaih	Frankie Dettori	Richard Hannon Jr.	1:32.45
2015	Crazy Horse	Robert Havlin	John Gosden	1:29.69
2016	Pleaseletmewin	Fran Berry	Ralph Beckett	1:27.48
2017	Nebo	Frankie Dettori	Charles Hills	1:27.87
2018	Mohaather	Martin Dwyer	Marcus Tregoning	1:27.56
2019 (Note: The 2019 and 2023 races were run at Newmarket after the original Newbury fixtures were abandoned due to waterlogging)	Kenzai Warrior	Jack Mitchell	Roger Teal	1:28.74
2020	Mujbar	Dane O'Neill	Charles Hills	1:34.23
2021	Light Infantry	Jamie Spencer	David Simcock	1:29.59
2022	Knight	David Egan	Simon & Ed Crisford	1:29.79
2023	Orne	Robert Havlin	John & Thady Gosden	1:32.62
2024	Make You Smile	Harry Davies	Hugo Palmer	1:33.24
2025	Time To Turn	William Buick	Charlie Appleby	1:30.59
2026	Bengal Tiger	Sean Levey	Aidan O'Brien	1:27.01

== See also ==
- Horse racing in Great Britain
- List of British flat horse races
