= 1959 King George VI and Queen Elizabeth Stakes =

Ninth running of the King George VI and Queen Elizabeth Stakes

9th King George VI and Queen Elizabeth Stakes
- King George VI and Queen Elizabeth Stakes
- Location: Ascot Racecourse
- Date: 18 July 1959
- Winning horse: Alcide' (GB)
- Jockey: Harry Carr
- Trainer: Capt. Cecil Boyd-Rochfort (GB)
- Owner: Sir Humphrey de Trafford

The 1959 King George VI and Queen Elizabeth Stakes was a horse race held at Ascot Racecourse on Saturday 18 July 1959. It was the 9th running of the King George VI and Queen Elizabeth Stakes.

== The contenders ==
The race attracted a field of eleven runners, four trained in the United Kingdom, five in France, one in Ireland and one in Germany. The favourite was the Cecil Boyd-Rochfort-trained Alcide, a four-year-old colt owned by Sir Humphrey de Trafford who had been a hot favourite for the previous year’s Epsom Derby, but could not run in that race because he was most likely ‘got at’ and had received a savage blow in his box, which had broken one of his ribs. The Irish challenger was Gladness. France was represented by Balbo, Al Mabsoot, Chief (owned by Prince Aly Khan), Ascot Gold Cup-winner Wallaby II (who in that race had beaten Alcide by a 'short head' into 2nd place 30 days ago) and Amourrou. The German challenger was the five-year-old Orsini, winner of the Deutsches Derby. Orsini's 5th place would be the best performance of a German-trained horse in the race until Danedream's success in 2012. Apart from Alcide, the best of the British-trained runners appeared to be the Epsom Oaks second Cantelo. The other runners were Pindari, owned by H. M. The Queen, and the filly Mirnaya.

== The race ==
Alcide was last into the straight, but, admirably ridden by William (‘Harry’) Carr, won comfortably.

== Race details ==
- Sponsor:
- First prize: £28,642
- Surface: Turf
- Going: Good
- Distance: 12 furlongs
- Number of runners: 11
- Winner's time: 2:31.39

== Full result ==
Pos.	Marg.	Horse (bred)	Age	Jockey	Trainer (Country)	Odds
1		Alcide (GB)	4	Harry Carr	Capt. Cecil Boyd-Rochfort (GB)	2/1 fav
2	2	Gladness (GB)	6	Garnet Bougoure	Vincent O'Brien (IRE)
3	¾	Balbo (FR)	5	J. Boullenger	(FR)
4	¾	Cantelo (GB)	3	Edward Hide	Capt. Charles Elsey (GB)
5	hd	Orsini (GER)	5	Lester Piggott	Adrian van Borcke (GER)
6		Pindari (GB)	3		Noel Murless (GB)
7		Al Mabsoot (FR)	5		(FR)
8		Mirnaya (GB)	3		(GB)
9		Chief (FR)	6	G. Lequeux	Alec Head (FR)
10		Wallaby II (FR)	4		Percy Carter (FR)
11		Amourrou (FR)	3		(FR)

* Abbreviations: nse = nose; nk = neck; shd = head; hd = head; dist = distance; UR = unseated rider

== Winner's details ==
Further details of the winner, Alcide

- Sex: Colt
- Foaled: xx xxxx 1955
- Country: United Kingdom
- Sire: Alycidon; Dam: Chenille (King Salmon)
- Owner: Sir Humphrey de Trafford
- Breeder: Sir Humphrey de Trafford
