= Dara Monarch =

British-bred Thoroughbred racehorse

- Sire: Realm
- Grandsire: Princely Gift
- Dam: Sardara
- Damsire: Alcide
- Sex: Stallion
- Foaled: 11 March 1979
- Country: United Kingdom
- Colour: Bay
- Breeder: Neville Bycroft
- Owner: Mrs L Browne; Tim Rogers
- Trainer: Liam Browne
- Record: 12: 4-1-1

Major wins
- Anglesey Stakes (1981); McCairns Trial Stakes (1982); Irish 2000 Guineas (1982); St James's Palace Stakes (1982)

Awards
- Timeform rating 108 (1981), 128 (1982)

Dara Monarch (11 March 1979 – January 2005) was a British-bred, Irish-trained Thoroughbred racehorse and sire. In 1981, he showed very promising form in Ireland, winning the Anglesey Stakes and finishing third in the Railway Stakes. In the following year, he won the McCairns Trial Stakes on his seasonal debut and then rebounded from an unplaced effort in the 2000 Guineas to record impressive victories in the Irish 2000 Guineas and St James's Palace Stakes. He was then affected by illness and ran poorly in his three remaining races. After standing as a breeding stallion in Ireland, he was exported to Czechoslovakia where he died in 2005.

== Background ==
Dara Monarch was a "neat, attractive" bay horse with no white markings bred in England by Neville Bycroft. As a young horse, he was twice sold at auction, making 6,400 guineas as a foal but only 5,000 guineas as a yearling. On the second occasion, he was bought by the bloodstock agent Peter Doyle on behalf of the trainer Liam Browne. During his track career, the colt was trained by Browne at the Curragh and raced in the colours of Browne's wife.

He was sired by Realm, a British stallion who competed in sprint races and recorded his biggest win in the 1971 July Cup. He was based in Europe in his early stud career before being exported to Japan in 1979. The stamina element in Dara Monarch's pedigree was provided by his dam Sardara who was a winner over two miles and a half-sister to the St Leger winner Intermezzo.

== Racing career ==
=== 1981: two-year-old season ===
Dara Monarch did not place in his first race, which was over six furlongs. In his second race, which was over seven furlongs, he came in second. Despite losing his first two races, Dara Monarch was entered in the Group Three Anglesey Stakes, a six and a half furlong race at the Curragh Racecourse in August. Starting a 66/1 outsider, he recorded his first success as he won by a length from the Vincent O'Brien-trained favourite Americus. The following month, Dara Monarch placed third in the Railway Stakes at the Curragh Racecourse, finishing strongly behind the winners Anfield and Day Is Done. The race was over the same six and a half furlong course as the Anglesey Stakes. On his final appearance of the year, he was stepped up in distance for the Ashford Castle Stakes over one mile in September but ran poorly and finished last of the eleven runners behind Anfield.

=== 1982: three-year-old season ===
Dara Monarch began his second campaign in the McCairns Trial Stakes over seven furlongs at Phoenix Park Racecourse and won by a length from Senior Citizen. The colt then faced a steep ascent in class when he was sent to England for the 2000 Guineas over one mile at Newmarket Racecourse on 1 May. He started the race at odds of 33/1 and was among the leaders for most of the race. However, he became tired in the final furlong and finished eighth out of 25 runners, with the French-trained Zino beating Wind and Wuthering in a photo-finish. Mick Kinane took the ride when the colt lined up for the Irish 1000 Guineas at the Curragh two weeks later. Wind and Wuthering was the favorite in a field of 14 runners, with Cajun and Raconteur also being heavily backed. Dara Monarch was an outsider at 20/1. The other contenders included Tender King (third in the 2000 Guineas), Anfield, Achieved (Phoenix Stakes), Full Extent (Gimcrack Stakes) and Red Sunset (Coventry Stakes). In a change of tactics, Dara Monarch was restrained towards the rear of the field before making his challenge on the outside in the last quarter mile. He accelerated into the lead a furlong out and drew away from his rivals to win by three lengths from Tender King.

In June, Dara Monarch ran for the second time in England when he contested the St James's Palace Stakes (then a Group Two race) at Royal Ascot. The Henry Cecil-trained Ivano started 2/1 favourite, not so much because of his wins in the Feilden Stakes and Dee Stakes, but because of his reportedly outstanding performances on the training gallops. Dara Monarch was the 7/2 second choice, with the other seven runners including his old rivals Wind and Wuthering, Tender King, Anfield, Red Sunset and Achieved. Wind and Wuthering led the race before tiring in the straight, allowing Red Sunset to overtake. However, Dara Monarch, who had been held back by Kinane earlier in the race, came from the outside to take the lead a furlong and a half from the finish. He established a clear advantage and, despite hanging sharply to the right in the closing stages, held off Tender King to win by one and a half lengths with six lengths back to Ivano in third. Timeform described his performance as "exhilarating".

After the race, Dara Monarch was sold as a prospective stallion to the breeder Tim Rogers. The colt contacted a viral infection and was off the course for two and a half months returning in the Waterford Crystal Mile at Goodwood Racecourse when he finished last of the eight runners behind Sandhurst Prince. He failed to recapture his form in his two subsequent races, finishing fourth to Buzzards Bay in the Queen Elizabeth II Stakes at Ascot in September and fifth behind Pas de Seul when sent to France to contest the Prix de la Forêt at Longchamp Racecourseon 24 October.

== Assessment ==
In the Irish Free Handicap for the two-year-olds of 1981, Dara Monarch was assigned a weight of 125 pounds, making him the thirteenth best juvenile to race in Ireland that year, eight pounds behind the top weight Achieved. The independent Timeform organisation gave him a rating of 108, making him 24 pounds inferior to their top two-year-old Wind and Wuthering. In the following year, Timeform rated him on 128, six pounds behind their best three-year-old colts Green Forest and Assert. They did, however, append a "d" to his rating, indicating that his form had deteriorated. In the official International Classification, he was given a rating of 83, making him the ninth best three-year-old colt in Europe, eleven pounds inferior to the top-rated Golden Fleece.

== Stud record ==
At the end of his racing career, Dara Monarch was retired to become a breeding stallion at the Grangewilliam Stud in Ireland. He was exported to Czechoslovakia in the late 1980s and spent the rest of his life at the Napajedla Stud. He reportedly died in January 2005. The best of his early crops was Broken Hearted, who won the Lockinge Stakes and became a successful National Hunt stallion, siring the Grand National winner Numbersixvalverde.

== Pedigree ==
Pedigree of Dara Monarch (GB), bay stallion, 1979
Sire Realm (GB) 1967	Princely Gift (GB); 1951	Nasrullah	Nearco
Sire Realm (GB) 1967	Princely Gift (GB); 1951	Nasrullah	Mumtaz Begum
Sire Realm (GB) 1967	Princely Gift (GB); 1951	Blue Gem	Blue Peter
Sire Realm (GB) 1967	Princely Gift (GB); 1951	Blue Gem	Sparkle
Sire Realm (GB) 1967	Quita (FR); 1962	Lavandin	Verso
Sire Realm (GB) 1967	Quita (FR); 1962	Lavandin	Lavande
Sire Realm (GB) 1967	Quita (FR); 1962	Eos	Solferino
Sire Realm (GB) 1967	Quita (FR); 1962	Eos	Ormel
Dam Sardara (GB) 1969	Alcide (GB); 1955	Alycidon	Donatello
Dam Sardara (GB) 1969	Alcide (GB); 1955	Alycidon	Aurora
Dam Sardara (GB) 1969	Alcide (GB); 1955	Chenille	King Salmon
Dam Sardara (GB) 1969	Alcide (GB); 1955	Chenille	Sweet Aloe
Dam Sardara (GB) 1969	Plaza (GB); 1958	Persian Gulf	Bahram
Dam Sardara (GB) 1969	Plaza (GB); 1958	Persian Gulf	Double Life
Dam Sardara (GB) 1969	Plaza (GB); 1958	Wild Success	Niccolo dell'Arca
Dam Sardara (GB) 1969	Plaza (GB); 1958	Wild Success	Lavinia (Family: 13-e)
