= Achieved =

Irish-bred Thoroughbred racehorse

- Sire: Thatch
- Grandsire: Forli
- Dam: Last Call
- Damsire: Klairon
- Sex: Stallion
- Foaled: 13 May 1979
- Country: Ireland
- Colour: Chestnut
- Breeder: James Wigan
- Owner: Robert Sangster
- Trainer: Vincent O'Brien
- Record: 9: 4-1-2

Major wins
- Phoenix Stakes (1981); Champagne Stakes (1981); Tetrarch Stakes (1982)

Awards
- Timeform rating 124 (1981), 125 (1982)

Honours
- Top-rated Irish two-year-old (1981)

Achieved (13 May 1979 – 1993) was an Irish Thoroughbred racehorse and sire. He won four of his nine races in a track career which lasted from July 1981 to September 1982. As a two-year-old he was undefeated in three starts including the Phoenix Stakes and the Champagne Stakes and was rated the best horse of his generation in Ireland. In the following year he won the Tetrarch Stakes and later finished third in both the Sussex Stakes and the Queen Elizabeth II Stakes. He was retired at the end of the year to become a breeding stallion but had no success as a sire of winners.

== Background ==
Achieved was a "neat" chestnut horse with a narrow white blaze bred in Ireland by James Wigan. As a yearling he was sent to the Houghton sale at Newmarket and was bought for 162,000 guineas by Robert Sangster, who got the better of a bidding duel with Henry Candy. The colt was sent into training with Vincent O'Brien at Ballydoyle.

He was from the fifth crop of foals sired by Thatch, an American-bred, Irish-trained horse who won the St James's Palace Stakes, July Cup and Sussex Stakes in 1973. His dam Last Call showed modest racing ability but was a successful broodmare whose other foals included Final Straw (July Stakes, Champagne Stakes, Greenham Stakes) and the Britannia Stakes winner Final Chord. She was a distant descendant of the British broodmare Spicebox (foaled 1923) who was the female-line ancestor of numerous major winners including Herbager, Detroit, Zabeel and Gildoran.

== Racing career ==
=== 1981: two-year-old season ===
Achieved made a successful debut in July 1981, when he was an easy winner of a minor race over five furlongs at Phoenix Park Racecourse. He was immediately moved up to Group 1 class for the Phoenix Stakes over the same course and distance on 8 August and was made the 4/6 favourite. The field was not a strong one by Group 1 standards, with the best fancied of his six opponents being the minor winners The Primate and Shir Khan and the unraced filly Dance Empress. Ridden by Pat Eddery, he started slowly and had to barge his way through the field in the final furlong before catching The Primate on the line and winning by a short head. An enquiry by the racecourse stewards left the result unaltered and their decision was confirmed by the Turf Club after the connections of The Primate lodged a formal appeal.

Although he was technically dropped in class for his next race, Achieved actually faced much stiffer opposition when he was sent to England to contest the Group 2 Champagne Stakes over seven furlongs at Doncaster Racecourse in September. Ridden again by Eddery he started the 11/4 second choice in the betting behind the Gimcrack Stakes winner Full Extent in eight-runner field which also included Red Sunset (Coventry Stakes). After tracking the leaders Achieved went to the front a furlong and a half from the finish and fought off a challenge from the Guy Harwood-trained Hays to win by one and half lengths. The form of the race was boosted ten days later when Hays won the Mill Reef Stakes by three lengths. Achieved was expected to return to England for the Royal Lodge Stakes but sustained a minor injury and did not race again that year.

In the official International Classification of two-year-olds for 1981 he was rated the best Irish juvenile and the eighth-best colt of his age in Europe. The independent Timeform organisation gave him a rating of 124, making him eight-pounds inferior to their best two-year-old Wind and Wuthering.

=== 1982: three-year-old season ===
At the start of the 1982 season Achieved was regarded as a serious contender for both the 2000 Guineas and The Derby. He began his campaign at the Curragh in April when he started odds-on favourite for the seven furlong Gladness Stakes but was beaten a short head by the four-year-old Kilian. Later that month he won the Tetrarch Stakes over the same course and distance but was not particularly impressive as he came home a length in front of Exhilarate. In the 2000 Guineas at Newmarket Racecourse on 1 May he started the 15/2 second favourite and kept on well without ever looking likely to win, finishing sixth of the twenty-six runners behind the French colt Zino. In the Irish 2,000 Guineas two weeks later he was partnered by George McGrath as Pat Eddery opted to ride Raconteur, the O'Brien stable's more fancied runner. Achieved finished sixth again, six and a half lengths behind the winner Dara Monarch but two lengths in front of Raconteur.

After four races in six weeks, Achieved was rested until 28 July when he was matched against older horses in the Sussex Stakes at Goodwood Racecourse. Wearing blinkers for the first time he produced probably his best effort of the season as he finished third to On The House and Sandhurst Prince, beaten just over a length by the winner with Bel Bolide in fourth and The Wonder in sixth. He ended his season in the Queen Elizabeth II Stakes at Ascot Racecourse in September in which he finished third behind Buzards Bay and Noalcoholic.

The International Classification for 1982 saw Achieved rated on 81, making him the 19th best tree-year-old colt of the season in Europe, 13 pounds behind his stablemate Golden Fleece. Timeform rated him on 125, nine pounds behind their top-rated three-year-olds Assert and Green Forest. In their annual Racehorses of 1982 Timeforem commented that he might have had more success if he had been tried over longer distances.

== Stud record ==
Achieved was retired from racing to become a breeding stallion at Winfields Farm in Kentucky where he stood at an initial fee of $12,500. He sired few foals and no Graded stakes race winners.

== Pedigree ==
Pedigree of Achieved (IRE), chestnut stallion, 1979
Sire Thatch (USA) 1970	Forli (ARG); 1963	Aristophanes	Hyperion
Sire Thatch (USA) 1970	Forli (ARG); 1963	Aristophanes	Commotion
Sire Thatch (USA) 1970	Forli (ARG); 1963	Trevisa	Advocate
Sire Thatch (USA) 1970	Forli (ARG); 1963	Trevisa	Veneta
Sire Thatch (USA) 1970	Thong (USA); 1964	Nantallah	Nasrullah
Sire Thatch (USA) 1970	Thong (USA); 1964	Nantallah	Shimmer
Sire Thatch (USA) 1970	Thong (USA); 1964	Rough Shod	Gold Bridge
Sire Thatch (USA) 1970	Thong (USA); 1964	Rough Shod	Dalmary
Dam Last Call (GB) 1964	Klairon (FR); 1952	Clarion	Djebel
Dam Last Call (GB) 1964	Klairon (FR); 1952	Clarion	Columba
Dam Last Call (GB) 1964	Klairon (FR); 1952	Calmia	Kantar
Dam Last Call (GB) 1964	Klairon (FR); 1952	Calmia	Sweet Lavender
Dam Last Call (GB) 1964	Stage Fright (GB); 1954	Big Game	Bahram
Dam Last Call (GB) 1964	Stage Fright (GB); 1954	Big Game	Myrobella
Dam Last Call (GB) 1964	Stage Fright (GB); 1954	Bashful	Precipitation
Dam Last Call (GB) 1964	Stage Fright (GB); 1954	Bashful	Saucy Sarah (Family: 16-c)
