= Zino (disambiguation) =

Zino is a Greek social networking site.

Zino may also refer to:

== People ==
- Zino Davidoff, founder of Davidoff, a tobacco brand
- Zino Francescatti (1902–1991), French violinist
- Zino Vinnikov (born 1943), Russian-Dutch violinist
- Lotem Zino (born 1992), Israeli footballer
- Paul Alexander Zino (1916–2004), British businessman and ornithologist
- Haim Zinovitch, half of Zino & Tommy, an Israeli musical duo

== Other uses ==
- Zino (horse), a racehorse
- Zino 300, HD 400 and HD 410, models of Dell Inspiron desktop computers
- A variety of the hypothetical gaugino particle

== See also ==
- Zino's petrel, a seabird
