= Thatching (horse) =

Irish-bred Thoroughbred racehorse

- Sire: Thatch
- Grandsire: Forli
- Dam: Abella
- Damsire: Abernant
- Sex: Stallion
- Foaled: 31 May 1975
- Country: Ireland
- Colour: Bay
- Breeder: Lyonstown House Stud
- Owner: Robert Sangster
- Trainer: Vincent O'Brien
- Record: 11:4-2-0

Major wins
- Duke of York Stakes (1979); Cork and Orrery Stakes (1979); July Cup (1979)

Awards
- Top-rated Irish racehorse (1979); Timeform best sprinter (1979); Timeform rating: 131

Thatching (31 May 1975 – 1999) was an Irish Thoroughbred racehorse and sire. The horse's early career was delayed and disrupted by injury, and he did not show his best form until switched to sprinting distances in the spring of 1979 when he won the Duke of York Stakes. He improved further when equipped with blinkers that summer, recording impressive victories in both the Cork and Orrery Stakes and the July Cup. He had a marked tendency to hang to the left when in front, which led to his disqualification in the William Hill Sprint Championship. He was retired to stud after winning four of his eleven races and became a successful breeding stallion.

== Background ==
Thatching was a bay horse with two white socks bred in County Tipperary by the Lyonstown House stud. He was from the first crop of foals sired by Thatch, an American-bred, Irish-trained horse who won the St James's Palace Stakes, July Cup and Sussex Stakes in 1973. Thatching's dam Abella was a successful racehorse who produced several other good horses including the Ballyogan Stakes winner Golden Thatch. During his racing career, the horse was owned by Robert Sangster, trained by Vincent O'Brien at Ballydoyle and ridden by the English jockey Lester Piggott.

== Racing career ==
=== 1978: three-year-old season ===
Thatching sustained a broken bone in one of his hind feet and did not race until the autumn of his three-year-old season. In October 1978 he was sent to England to make his racecourse debut in the Severals Stakes over one mile at Newmarket Racecourse. He started the odds-on favourite but finished second, beaten three lengths by the Guy Harwood trained Portese. Later in the month he ran twice at Leopardstown Racecourse, finishing second over seven furlongs and then recording his first success in a nine furlong maiden race.

=== 1979: four-year-old season ===
Thatching began his four-year-old season in the Group Three Earl of Sefton Stakes over nine furlongs at Newmarket in which he finished fifth behind his owner's more fancied runner Hawaiian Sound. After being exposed as some way behind the best at longer distances, Thatching was then campaigned over sprint distances and showed much improved form. In May he contested the Group Three over six furlongs at York Racecourse and started at odds of 17/2. Owing to a strike by employees of Racecourse Technical Services the starting stalls were not available and the race had to be started by flag. Thatching was left behind at the start but recovered to take the lead inside the final furlong, and despite veering to the left in the closing stages he won decisively from Persepolis and the Ayr Gold Cup winner Vaigly Great. Later in the month, Thatching started favourite for the Temple Stakes over five furlongs at Sandown Park Racecourse but finished fifth behind Double Form after hanging badly again in the final quarter mile. O'Brien was extremely disappointed with the performance, as the colt had been performing impressively in training.

For his next race, the Group Three Cork and Orrery Stakes at Royal Ascot in June, Thatching was equipped with blinkers for the first time. Starting at odds of 6/1 in a field of seventeen runners, the colt demonstrated what Timeform described as "remarkable power", racing among the leaders from the start and drawing clear in the closing stages to win by four lengths from the filly Rose Above. Thatching was then moved up to Group One class for the July Cup at Newmarket in which he started 2/1 favourite against a strong field including One In A Million, Vaigly Great, Sigy (Prix de l'Abbaye), Devon Ditty (Cheveley Park Stakes), Absalom (Vernons Sprint Cup). Piggott sent Thatching into the lead shortly after the start and by half way most of the other runners were struggling to match his pace. In the last quarter mile he pulled clear of the field to win by five lengths from Vaigly Great. Later in the month, Thatching was moved up in distance for the Sussex Stakes over one mile at Goodwood Racecourse but failed to stay and finished unplaced behind Kris. The colt then returned to sprinting for the William Hill Sprint Championship over five furlongs at York. He took the lead just after half way but veered to the left, causing interference to several other runners before crossing the line two and a half lengths clear of Ahonoora with Abdu third and Double Form in fourth. Following an inquiry by the racecourse stewards, however, Thatching was disqualified and relegated to last place, whilst Piggott received a four-day suspension for his ride.

Thatching's last was the Prix de l'Abbaye over 1000 metres at Longchamp Racecourse in October. Drawn on the outside of the thirteen runner field he was never able to get into contention and finished unplaced behind Double Form.

== Assessment ==
In 1978, the independent Timeform organisation gave Thatching a rating of 98, thirty-five pounds below their top-rated three-year-old Ile de Bourbon. In the following year, Thatching was rated 131 by Timeform and rated the best sprinter of the year. In the official International Classification Thatching was rated the second-best older horse in Europe and the fifth best horse of any age after Three Troikas, Troy, Ile de Bourbon and Le Marmot.

== Stud record ==
Thatching was retired from racing to stand as a breeding stallion at Coolmore's Longfield Stud at Cashel, County Tipperary at an initial fee of £8,000. Thatching was euthanized at Castlehyde Stud, County Cork in 1999 due to infirmities of old age.

Thatching had some success at stud, siring several major winners:

- Chaumeire, foaled 1981, won Magnet Cup twice
- Mansooj, 1984, won July Stakes
- Wiganthorpe, 1984, won Gimcrack Stakes
- Tirol, 1987, won 2000 Guineas, Irish 2,000 Guineas
- Polar Bird, 1987, won Debutante Stakes
- Shalford, 1988, won Diadem Stakes, Duke of York Stakes, Cork and Orrery Stakes
- Danseuse du Soir, 1988, won Poule d'Essai des Pouliches, Prix de la Forêt, Prix Robert Papin, Prix de la Grotte
- Archway, 1988, won Greenlands Stakes, sire of Hardy Eustace
- Revelation, 1990, won Prix Eugène Adam
- Sugarfoot, 1994, won Leicestershire Stakes, Park Stakes

== Sire line tree ==
- Thatching
  - Chaumeire
  - Mansooj
  - Wiganthorpe
  - Tirol
  - Archway
    - Hardy Eustace
  - Shalford
  - Revelation
  - Sugarfoot

== Pedigree ==
Pedigree of Thatching (IRE), bay stallion, 1975
Sire Thatch (USA) 1970	Forli (ARG); 1963	Aristophanes	Hyperion*
Sire Thatch (USA) 1970	Forli (ARG); 1963	Aristophanes	Commotion
Sire Thatch (USA) 1970	Forli (ARG); 1963	Trevisa	Advocate
Sire Thatch (USA) 1970	Forli (ARG); 1963	Trevisa	Veneta
Sire Thatch (USA) 1970	Thong (USA); 1964	Nantallah	Nasrullah
Sire Thatch (USA) 1970	Thong (USA); 1964	Nantallah	Shimmer
Sire Thatch (USA) 1970	Thong (USA); 1964	Rough Shod	Gold Bridge
Sire Thatch (USA) 1970	Thong (USA); 1964	Rough Shod	Dalmary*
Dam Abella (GB) 1968	Abernant (GB); 1946	Owen Tudor	Hyperion*
Dam Abella (GB) 1968	Abernant (GB); 1946	Owen Tudor	Mary Tudor
Dam Abella (GB) 1968	Abernant (GB); 1946	Rustom Mahal	Rustom Pasha
Dam Abella (GB) 1968	Abernant (GB); 1946	Rustom Mahal	Mumtaz Mahal
Dam Abella (GB) 1968	Darrica (GB); 1958	Darius	Dante
Dam Abella (GB) 1968	Darrica (GB); 1958	Darius	Yasna
Dam Abella (GB) 1968	Darrica (GB); 1958	Erica Fragrans	Big Game
Dam Abella (GB) 1968	Darrica (GB); 1958	Erica Fragrans	Jennydang*

* Thatching is inbred 4S x 4D to the stallion Hyperion, meaning that he appears fourth generation on the sire side of his pedigree, and fourth generation on the dam side of his pedigree.

* Thatching is inbred 4S x 5D to the mare Dalmary, meaning that she appears fourth generation on the sire side of his pedigree, and fifth generation (via Jennydang) on the dam side of his pedigree.
