= Tetrarch Stakes =

Flat horse race in Ireland

- Class: Listed
- Location: Curragh Racecourse; County Kildare, Ireland
- Race type: Flat / Thoroughbred
- Sponsor: Coolmore Stud
- Website: Curragh

Race information
- Distance: 1 mile (1,609 metres)
- Surface: Turf
- Track: Right-hand elbow
- Qualification: Three-year-olds
- Weight: 9 st 5 lb Allowances; 5 lb for fillies Penalties; 5 lb for Group 1 or Group 2 winners 3 lb for Group 3 winners
- Purse: €50,000 (2024); 1st: €29,500

Tetrarch Stakes
2026
Causeway	Andab	Neolithic

Previous years
2025
Officer	Currawood	Alakazi
2024
Bright Stripes	Norwalk Havoc	Samuel Colt
2023
Paddington	Drumroll	Mister Mister
2022
Buckaroo	Wexford Native	New Energy
2021
Lunar Space	Magnanimous	Horoscope

2020-2011
2020
Aztec Parade	Free Solo	Agitare
2019
Shelir	Eclipse Storm	Flash Gordon
2018
Imaging	Would Be King	Brother Bear
2017
Doctor Geoff	Drumfad Bay	True Valour
2016
Awtaad	Blue De Vega	Embiran
2015
Tombelaine	Endless Drama	The Warrior
2014
Alkasser	Focus On Venice	Intensical
2013
Sruthan	Fortify	Pop Art
2012
Takar	Coolnagree	Triumphant
2011
Imperial Rome	Zabarajad	Alexander Pope

2010-2001
2010
Free Judgement	Dynasty	Zayaan
2009
Vocalised	Chief Lone Eagle	Count John
2008
Capt Chaos	Great War Eagle	Mr Medici
2007
Creachadoir	Mr Napper Tandy	Eyshal
2006
Decado	Sir Xaar	Hurricane Cat
2005
Indesatchel	Emerald Cat	Elusive Double
2004
Leitrim House	Grand Reward	Mokabra
2003
France	Al Turf	Dalcassian
2002
Century City	Successive Gains	Beverly Green
2001
Modigliani	Scarlet Velvet	Mozart

2000-1993
2000
Monashee Mountain	Legal Jousting	Anzari
1999
Major Force	Namid	Marius Petipa
1998
Two-Twenty-Two	Chateau Royal	Shaquille
1997
Desert King	Rich Ground	Lil's Boy
1996
Gothenberg	Rainbow Blues	Force Of Will
1995
Desert Style	Nautical Pet	Burden Of Proof
1994
Quintiliani	Ridgewood Ben	Kly Green
1993
College Chapel	Master Tribe	Nordic Fox

The Tetrarch Stakes is a Listed flat horse race in Ireland open to three-year-old thoroughbreds. It is run over a distance of 1 mile (1,609 metres) at the Curragh in early May.

== History ==
The event is named after The Tetrarch, a successful Irish racehorse foaled in 1911. The 2021 running carried the name of Dick McCormick, an Irish racehorse trainer who was one of the few men who rode The Tetrarch in workouts.

For a period the Tetrarch Stakes held Group 3 status. It was downgraded to Listed level in 2011.

The Tetrarch Stakes can serve as a trial for the Irish 2,000 Guineas. The last horse to win both races was Paddington in 2023.

The distance of the event was increased from 7 furlongs to 1 mile in 2022.

== Records ==
Leading jockey since 1950 (5 wins):

- Michael Kinane – Flash of Steel (1986), Big Shuffle (1987), Monashee Mountain (2000), Century City (2002), Leitrim House (2004)
- Kevin Manning - Desert Style (1995), Creachadoir (2007), Vocalised (2009), Free Judgement (2010), Lunar Space (2021)

Leading trainer since 1950 (13 wins):

- Vincent O'Brien – Harry (1968), Sahib (1969), Minsky (1971), Home Guard (1972), Dapper (1973), Cellini (1974), Achieved (1982), Salmon Leap (1983), Northern Plain (1985), Prince of Birds (1988), Saratogan (1989), Royal Academy (1990), College Chapel (1993)

== Winners since 1980 ==
Year	Winner	Jockey	Trainer	Time
1980	Current Charge	Dermot Hogan	Christy Grassick
1981	Dance Bid	Wally Swinburn	Dermot Weld
1982	Achieved	Pat Eddery	Vincent O'Brien
1983	Salmon Leap	Pat Eddery	Vincent O'Brien
1984	Secreto	Christy Roche	David O'Brien	1:25.00
1985	Northern Plain	Pat Eddery	Vincent O'Brien
1986	Flash of Steel	Michael Kinane	Dermot Weld	1:32.40
1987	Big Shuffle	Michael Kinane	Dermot Weld	1:26.10
1988	Prince of Birds	John Reid	Vincent O'Brien	1:30.60
1989	Saratogan	John Reid	Vincent O'Brien
1990	Royal Academy	John Reid	Vincent O'Brien	1:27.30
1991	Star of Gdansk	Christy Roche	Jim Bolger	1:28.80
1992	Irish Memory	Christy Roche	Jim Bolger	1:33.40
1993	College Chapel	Willie Supple	Vincent O'Brien	1:36.10
1994	Quintiliani	John Egan	Peadar Matthews	1:44.30
1995	Desert Style	Kevin Manning	Jim Bolger	1:29.90
1996	Gothenburg	Jason Weaver	Mark Johnston	1:26.20
1997	Desert King	Christy Roche	Aidan O'Brien	1:22.80
1998	Two-Twenty-Two	Pat Smullen	Dermot Weld	1:32.20
1999	Major Force	Pat Smullen	Dermot Weld	1:35.20
2000	Monashee Mountain	Michael Kinane	Aidan O'Brien	1:33.40
2001	Modigliani	Paul Scallan	Aidan O'Brien	1:26.30
2002	Century City	Michael Kinane	Aidan O'Brien	1:28.40
2003	France	Seamie Heffernan	Aidan O'Brien	1:25.80
2004	Leitrim House	Michael Kinane	Brian Meehan	1:22.30
2005	Indesatchel	Jamie Spencer	David Wachman	1:35.90
2006	Decado	Declan McDonogh	Kevin Prendergast	1:27.10
2007	Creachadoir	Kevin Manning	Jim Bolger	1:22.50
2008	Capt Chaos (Note: The 2008 winner Capt Chaos was later exported to Hong Kong and renamed Energized)	Chris Hayes	Edward Lynam	1:32.46
2009	Vocalised	Kevin Manning	Jim Bolger	1:34.82
2010	Free Judgement	Kevin Manning	Jim Bolger	1:28.88
2011	Imperial Rome	Wayne Lordan	David Wachman	1:26.00
2012	Takar	Johnny Murtagh	John Oxx	1:34.77
2013	Sruthan	Chris Hayes	Paul Deegan	1:29.20
2014	Alkasser	Leigh Roche	Dermot Weld	1:26.69
2015	Tombelaine	Pat Smullen	Dermot Weld	1:33.08
2016	Awtaad	Chris Hayes	Kevin Prendergast	1:28.82
2017	Doctor Geoff (Note: The 2017 and 2018 races took place at Naas due to redevelopment work at The Curragh.)	Gary Carroll	Ger Lyons	1:26.30
2018	Imaging	Declan McDonogh	Dermot Weld	1:27.54
2019	Shelir	Chris Hayes	Dermot Weld	1:26.84
2020	Aztec Parade (Note: The 2020 race took place at Cork in September due to the COVID-19 pandemic)	Colin Keane	Johnny Murtagh	1:23.58
2021	Lunar Space	Kevin Manning	Jim Bolger	1:28.39
2022	Buckaroo	Shane Crosse	Joseph O'Brien	1:43.33
2023	Paddington	Seamie Heffernan	Aidan O'Brien	1:46.88
2024	Bright Stripes	Billy Lee	Andy Oliver	1:49.57
2025	Officer	Ryan Moore	Aidan O'Brien	1:39.27
2026	Causeway	Ryan Moore	Aidan O'Brien	1:37.40

== Earlier winners ==
- 1947: Sea Flower
- 1948: Beau Sabreur
- 1949: Solonaway
- 1950: Princess Trudy
- 1951: Signal Box
- 1952: Stella Aurata
- 1953: Treetops Hotel
- 1954: Tale of Two Cities
- 1955: Bright Night
- 1956: Milesian
- 1957: Jack Ketch
- 1958: Tharp
- 1959: Sovereign Path
- 1960: Kythnos
- 1961: Time Greine
- 1962: Assurance
- 1963: Vertigo
- 1964: Majority Blue
- 1965: Quintillian
- 1966: Ultimate
- 1967: Bold Lad
- 1968: Harry
- 1969: Sahib
- 1970: El Kuntilla
- 1971: Minsky
- 1972: Home Guard
- 1973: Dapper
- 1974: Cellini
- 1975: Dempsey
- 1976: Poacher's Moon
- 1977: Lordedaw
- 1978: Columbanus
- 1979: Gerald Martin

== See also ==
- Horse racing in Ireland
- List of Irish flat horse races
