= Tirol (horse) =

Thoroughbred racehorse

- Sire: Thatching
- Grandsire: Thatch
- Dam: Alpine Niece
- Damsire: Great Nephew
- Sex: Stallion
- Foaled: 16 March 1987
- Country: United Kingdom
- Colour: Brown
- Breeder: Mrs R D Peacock & Swettenham Stud
- Owner: John Horgan
- Trainer: Richard Hannon Sr.
- Record: 9:5-1-2
- Earnings: £323,811

Major wins
- Horris Hill Stakes (1989); Craven Stakes (1989); 2000 Guineas (1990); Irish 2,000 Guineas (1990)

Tirol (16 March 1987 – August 2007) was an Irish-bred, British-trained Thoroughbred racehorse and sire. In a racing career that lasted from July 1989 to September 1990 he ran nine times in Britain, Ireland and France. Beginning in September 1989, he won five consecutive races, culminating the following spring with successes in the Classic 2000 Guineas at Newmarket (in record time) and the Irish 2,000 Guineas at the Curragh. After two defeats later in 1990 Tirol was retired to stud, where he had some success as a sire of winners. He died in India in 2007.

== Background ==
Tirol was a brown horse bred in Ireland by a partnership of Mrs R. D. Peacock and Robert Sangster's Swettenham Stud. As a weanling he was sent to the December sales where Mrs Peacock bought him outright by paying 13,000 guineas for Sangster's share. The following year he was sent to the Newmarket Highflyer sale where he was bought for 52,000 guineas by the bloodstock agent Peter Doyle on behalf of the Cork businessman John Horgan, who sent him to be trained in England by Richard Hannon Sr. Tirol was arguably the best horse got by his sire Thatching, a top class sprinter who won the July Cup in 1979. His dam Alpine Niece showed little ability as a racehorse, but had a good pedigree, being a daughter of Great Nephew, the sire of the Derby winners Grundy and Shergar.

== Racing career ==
=== 1989: two-year-old season ===
Tirol began his racing career in a six furlong maiden race at Newbury in July in which he was ridden by Brian Rouse. He led a furlong from the finish but was overtaken in the closing stages and crossed the line in third place behind Curia Regis. Eight days later he ran in a similar event at Newmarket in which he started 7/4 favourite, but finished four lengths second to Batzushka. His next start was at the St Leger meeting at Doncaster, where he contested a Graduation Stakes (a race for horses who had won no more than one race). He took the lead two furlongs from the finish and recorded his first victory by beating Cutting Note by half a length at odds of 10/1. For his final race as a two-year-old, Tirol was moved up in class for the Group Three Horris Hill Stakes over seven furlongs at Newbury. Ridden by Pat Eddery he turned into the straight in third place before taking the lead a furlong out and getting the better of a closely contested finish to win by a head from Robellation.

=== 1990: three-year-old season ===
Tirol began his three-year-old season with a run in the Craven Stakes, a recognised trial race for the 2000 Guineas. He was held up by Eddery in the early stages before being produced with a strong late run to lead in the last strides and win by a short head from Sure Sharp. In the 2000 Guineas over one mile at Newmarket sixteen days later, Tirol started 9/1 fourth choice in the betting in a field of fourteen colts. The undefeated French-trained colt Machiavellian was made 6/4 favourite ahead of the European Free Handicap winner Anshan and the Guy Harwood-trained Now Listen, ridden by Eddery. Tirol, ridden by Mick Kinane moved into contention three furlongs from the finish and took the lead from Anshan entering the final furlong as Freddy Head produced Machiavellian with a strong run. In the closing stages Tirol was driven out by Kinane to hold the challenge of the favourite and win by two lengths. The winning time of 1:35.84 was the fastest electrically recorded time for the race (My Babu's 1:35.8 in 1948 had been hand-timed). Two weeks after his Newmarket win, Tirol attempted to become the third 2000 Guineas winner, following Right Tack in 1969 and the Richard Hannon-trained Don't Forget Me in 1987, to take the Irish 2000 Guineas at the Curragh. Reunited with Pat Eddery he started the 5/4 favourite in a field which included Machiavellian, Royal Academy and Mr Brooks. Tirol took the lead in the straight but was headed inside the final furlong by Royal Academy before rallying "bravely" to regain the advantage in the last strides and win by a neck.

After five successive wins, Tirol was moved up in distance for the Grand Prix de Paris over 2000 metres at Longchamp Racecourse on 24 June. Tirol was towards the rear of the field in the early stages and although he made some progress in the straight he never looked likely to win and finished third, eight lengths behind the easy winner Saumarez. After the race Hannon stated that the "sticky" ground, rather than the distance, was responsible for his colt's disappointing performance. Tirol was brought back to a mile for his next race and started favourite for the Queen Elizabeth II Stakes at Ascot in September. He failed to recover his spring form however, and after struggling early in the straight he was eased down by his rider Willie Carson and finished eighth of the ten runners behind Markofdistinction.

== Stud career ==
Tirol was retired to the Coolmore Stud in Ireland. For several years he was also "shuttled" to stand in Australia during the southern hemisphere breeding season. in 1997 he was exported to the Capricorn Stud Farm at Pune, India where sired several important winners before dying of colic in August 2007. Tirol had had some success as a stallion in Europe, siring the winners of more than six hundred races including the Group One winning fillies Miss Tahiti (Prix Marcel Boussac) and Tarascon (Irish 1,000 Guineas, Moyglare Stud Stakes).

Following Tirol's death, Richard Hannon paid tribute to the horse, calling him "one of the best horses that we've ever had here. We always held him in high regard, as he was a good, sound horse to have anything to do with, and had a very good turn of foot."

== Pedigree ==
Pedigree of Tirol (IRE), brown stallion, 1987
Sire Thatching (IRE) 1975	Thatch (USA); 1970	Forli	Aristophanes
Sire Thatching (IRE) 1975	Thatch (USA); 1970	Forli	Trevisa
Sire Thatching (IRE) 1975	Thatch (USA); 1970	Thong	Nantallah
Sire Thatching (IRE) 1975	Thatch (USA); 1970	Thong	Rough Shod
Sire Thatching (IRE) 1975	Abella (GB); 1968	Abernant	Owen Tudor
Sire Thatching (IRE) 1975	Abella (GB); 1968	Abernant	Rustom Mahal
Sire Thatching (IRE) 1975	Abella (GB); 1968	Darrica	Darius
Sire Thatching (IRE) 1975	Abella (GB); 1968	Darrica	Erica Fragrans
Dam Alpine Niece (GB) 1972	Great Nephew (GB); 1963	Honeyway	Fairway
Dam Alpine Niece (GB) 1972	Great Nephew (GB); 1963	Honeyway	Honey Buzzard
Dam Alpine Niece (GB) 1972	Great Nephew (GB); 1963	Sybil's Niece	Admiral's Walk
Dam Alpine Niece (GB) 1972	Great Nephew (GB); 1963	Sybil's Niece	Sybil's Sister
Dam Alpine Niece (GB) 1972	Fragrant Morn (GB); 1966	Mourne	Vieux Manoir
Dam Alpine Niece (GB) 1972	Fragrant Morn (GB); 1966	Mourne	Ballynash
Dam Alpine Niece (GB) 1972	Fragrant Morn (GB); 1966	Alpine Scent	Chamoissaire
Dam Alpine Niece (GB) 1972	Fragrant Morn (GB); 1966	Alpine Scent	Fragrant View (Family:10-c)
