= Lingfield Derby Trial =

Flat horse race in Britain

Lingfield Derby Trial Stakes
- Class: Listed
- Location: Lingfield Park; Lingfield, England
- Inaugurated: 1932
- Race type: Flat / Thoroughbred
- Sponsor: William Hill
- Website: Lingfield Park

Race information
- Distance: 1m 3f 133y (2,334m)
- Surface: Turf
- Track: Left-handed
- Qualification: Three-year-old colts and geldings
- Weight: 9 st 2 lb Penalties; 5 lb for Group 1 or Group 2 winners * 3 lb for Group 3 or Listed winners * * since 31 August 2023
- Purse: £60,000 (2024); 1st: £34,488

Lingfield Derby Trial
2026
Maltese Cross	Bay Of Brilliance	Balzac

Previous years
2025
Puppet Master	Stay True	Nightime Dancer
2024
Ambiente Friendly	Illinois	Meydaan
2023
Military Order	Waipiro	Circle of Fire
2022
United Nations	Walk Of Stars	Natural World
2021
Third Realm	Adayar	Scope

2020-2011
2020
English King	Berkshire Rocco	Summeronsevenhills
2019
Anthony Van Dyck	Pablo Escobarr	Nate The Great
2018
Knight To Behold	Kew Gardens	Corelli
2017
Best Solution	Glencadam Glory	Tartini
2016
Humphrey Bogart	Carntop	Across The Stars
2015
Kilimanjaro	Magic Dancer	Christophermarlowe
2014
Snow Sky	Hartnell	Sudden Wonder
2013
Nevis	Elidor	Pasaka Boy
2012
Main Sequence	Shantaram	Cavaleiro
2011
Dordogne	Hurricane Higgins	Measuring Time

2010-2001
2010
Bullet Train	Dubawi Phantom	Hot Prospect
2009
Age of Aquarius	Montaff	Father Time
2008
Alessandro Volta	King of Rome	Campanologist
2007
Aqaleem	Hearthstead Maison	Kid Mambo
2006
Linda's Lad	Hazeymm	Baan
2005
Kong	Walk in the Park	Melrose Avenue
2004
Percussionist	Hazyview	Five Dynasties
2003
Franklins Gardens	Let Me Try Again	Shanty Star
2002
Bandari	Long Goodbye	Wahchi
2001
Perfect Sunday	Putra Sandhurst	When In Rome

2000-1991
2000
Saddler's Quest	Going Global	King O' The Mana
1999
Lucido	Daliapour	Royal Rebel
1998
High-Rise	Sadian	Dashing Chief
1997
Silver Patriarch	Tanaasa	Basman
1996
Mystic Knight	Heron Island	Zaforum
1995
Munwar	Riyadian	In Camera
1994
Hawker's News	Chocolat De Meguro	Wishing
1993
Bob's Return	Tioman Island	Shareek
1992
Assessor	Tapis Rouge	Bonny Scot
1991
Corrupt	Young Buster	Selkirk

1990-1983
1990
Rock Hopper	Benzine	Great Heights
1989
Cacoethes	Pirate Army	Spitfire
1988
Kahyasi	Insan	Joruri
1987
Legal Bid	Mountain Kingdom	Shantaroun
1986
Mashkour	Bakharoff	Tisn't
1985
Slip Anchor	Lord Grundy	Cadmium
1984
Alphabatim	Get the Message	Bye Bye Birdie
1983
Teenoso	Shearwalk	Yawa

The Lingfield Derby Trial Stakes is a Listed flat horse race in Great Britain open to three-year-old colts and geldings. It is run over a distance of 1 mile, 3 furlongs and 133 yards (2,334 metres) at Lingfield Park in May.

== History ==
Established in 1932, the event serves as a trial for the Epsom Derby. The first running was won by the subsequent Derby winner April the Fifth.

The left-handed track at Lingfield Park is similar to that at Epsom. It has an undulating, cambered terrain with a sharp downhill turn into the home straight.

Nine winners of the race have achieved victory in the Derby. The most recent was Anthony Van Dyck in 2019. The most recent participant to win the Derby is Adayar, the 2021 runner-up.

For a period the Derby Trial Stakes held Group 3 status. It was relegated to Listed level in 2013.

== Records ==
Leading jockey (6 wins):

- Harry Carr – Black Tarquin (1948), Aureole (1953), Doutelle (1957), Alcide (1958), Parthia (1959), Pardao (1961)

Leading trainer (10 wins):

- Cecil Boyd-Rochfort – Hypnotist (1939), Black Tarquin (1948), Brown Rover (1949), North Carolina (1951), Aureole (1953), Doutelle (1957), Alcide (1958), Parthia (1959), Jet Stream (1960), Pardao (1961)

== Winners ==
Year	Winner	Jockey	Trainer	Time
1932	April the Fifth	Freddy Lane	Tom Walls	2:41.00
1933	Myosotis	Freddie Fox	Joseph Lawson	2:34.40
1934	Medieval Knight	Gordon Richards	Fred Darling	2:43.60
1935	Field Trial	Freddie Fox	Joseph Lawson	2:42.80
1936	Barrystar	Joseph Marshall	Walter Nightingall	2:43.60
1937	Mid-day Sun	Michael Beary	Frank Butters	2:59.00
1938	Blandstar	Harry Sprague	George Duller	2:38.40
1939	Hypnotist	Billy Nevett	Cecil Boyd-Rochfort
	no race 1940–45
1946	Fast And Fair	Cliff Richards	Joseph Lawson	2:40.20
1947	Sayajirao	Edgar Britt	Sam Armstrong	2:35.40
1948	Black Tarquin	Harry Carr	Cecil Boyd-Rochfort	2:39.80
1949	Brown Rover	Billy Cook	Cecil Boyd-Rochfort	2:39.00
1950	Tramper	Thomas Hawcroft	Walter Nightingall	2:48.80
1951	North Carolina	Charlie Elliott	Cecil Boyd-Rochfort	2:40.20
1952	Tulyar	Charlie Smirke	Marcus Marsh	2:42.80
1953	Aureole	Harry Carr	Cecil Boyd-Rochfort	2:40.80
1954	Rowston Manor	Doug Smith	Harry Peacock	2:45.00
1955	True Cavalier	Snowy Fawdon	Harvey Leader	2:42.40
1956	Induna	Charlie Smirke	Marcus Marsh	2:35.60
1957	Doutelle	Harry Carr	Cecil Boyd-Rochfort	2:41.40
1958	Alcide	Harry Carr	Cecil Boyd-Rochfort	2:41.80
1959	Parthia	Harry Carr	Cecil Boyd-Rochfort	2:44.00
1960	Jet Stream	Doug Smith	Cecil Boyd-Rochfort	2:49.40
1961	Pardao	Harry Carr	Cecil Boyd-Rochfort	2:42.60
1962	Pindaric	Bobby Elliott	Tom Masson	2:41.80
1963	Duplation	Jimmy Lindley	Towser Gosden	2:45.80
1964	Oncidium	Eph Smith	John Waugh	2:42.80
1965	Solstice	Jimmy Lindley	Jack Watts	2:35.40
1966	Black Prince II	Brian Taylor	Jack Watts	2:50.00
1967	Heave Ho	Bill Williamson	Seamus McGrath	2:41.00
1968	Laureate	Willie Carson	Bernard van Cutsem	2:45.40
1969	The Elk	Lester Piggott	Jeremy Tree	2:39.80
1970	Meadowville	Geoff Lewis	Michael Jarvis	2:51.00
1971	Homeric	Joe Mercer	Dick Hern	2:37.80
1972	Charling	Jimmy Lindley	Gordon Smyth	2:52.00
1973	Ksar	Willie Carson	Bernard van Cutsem	2:44.62
1974	Bustino	Joe Mercer	Dick Hern	2:39.88
1975	Patch	Pat Eddery	Peter Walwyn	2:40.54
1976	Norfolk Air	Ron Hutchinson	John Dunlop	2:37.60
1977	Caporello	Eric Eldin	Gavin Pritchard-Gordon	2:51.29
1978	Whitstead	Brian Taylor	Ryan Price	2:56.73
1979	Milford	Joe Mercer	Dick Hern	Not taken
1980	Ginistrelli	Joe Mercer	Henry Cecil	2:36.54
1981	Riberetto	Philip Robinson	Ron Boss	2:38.04
1982	Jalmood	Willie Carson	John Dunlop	2:33.51
1983	Teenoso	Steve Cauthen	Geoff Wragg	2:54.63
1984	Alphabatim	Brian Rouse	Guy Harwood	2:34:48
1985	Slip Anchor	Steve Cauthen	Henry Cecil	2:37.45
1986	Mashkour	Steve Cauthen	Henry Cecil	2:43.54
1987	Legal Bid	Steve Cauthen	Henry Cecil	2:32.03
1988	Kahyasi	Ray Cochrane	Luca Cumani	2:39.00
1989	Cacoethes	Greville Starkey	Guy Harwood	2:30.89
1990	Rock Hopper	Walter Swinburn	Michael Stoute	2:28.35
1991	Corrupt	Cash Asmussen	Neville Callaghan	2:27.01
1992	Assessor	Walter Swinburn	Richard Hannon Sr.	2:31.65
1993	Bob's Return	Philip Robinson	Mark Tompkins	2:25.34
1994	Hawker's News	Walter Swinburn	Henry Cecil	2:34.42
1995	Munwar	Willie Carson	Peter Walwyn	2:25.37
1996	Mystic Knight	Frankie Dettori	Roger Charlton	2:25.79
1997	Silver Patriarch	Pat Eddery	John Dunlop	2:34.44
1998	High-Rise	Frankie Dettori	Luca Cumani	2:24.80
1999	Lucido	Richard Quinn	John Dunlop	2:30.31
2000	Saddler's Quest	Kevin Darley	Gerard Butler	2:35.24
2001	Perfect Sunday	Richard Hughes	Barry Hills	2:30.37
2002	Bandari	Kevin Darley	Mark Johnston	2:28.47
2003	Franklins Gardens	Darryll Holland	Mark Tompkins	2:33.23
2004	Percussionist	Frankie Dettori	John Gosden	2:38.30
2005	Kong	Richard Quinn	John Dunlop	2:34.51
2006	Linda's Lad	Christophe Soumillon	André Fabre	2:29.25
2007	Aqaleem	Richard Hills	Marcus Tregoning	2:31.46
2008	Alessandro Volta	Johnny Murtagh	Aidan O'Brien	2:28.91
2009	Age of Aquarius	Johnny Murtagh	Aidan O'Brien	2:29.93
2010	Bullet Train	Tom Queally	Henry Cecil	2:32.48
2011	Dordogne	Neil Callan	Mark Johnston	2:29.50
2012 (Note: The 2012 running took place on Lingfield's all-weather track over 1 mile and 4 furlongs)	Main Sequence	Ted Durcan	David Lanigan	2:28.83
2013	Nevis	Ryan Moore	Aidan O'Brien	2:40.09
2014	Snow Sky	Jim Crowley	Sir Michael Stoute	2:30.68
2015	Kilimanjaro	Ryan Moore	Aidan O'Brien	2:35.17
2016	Humphrey Bogart	Sean Levey	Richard Hannon Jr.	2:28.29
2017	Best Solution	Pat Cosgrave	Saeed bin Suroor	2:31.84
2018	Knight To Behold	Richard Kingscote	Harry Dunlop	2:28.19
2019	Anthony Van Dyck	Ryan Moore	Aidan O'Brien	2:31.27
2020 (Note: The 2020 race was run in June, due to the COVID-19 pandemic in the United Kingdom)	English King	Tom Marquand	Ed Walker	2:24.36
2021	Third Realm	David Egan	Roger Varian	2:35.15
2022	United Nations	Ryan Moore	Aidan O'Brien	2:26.68
2023 (Note: The 2023 running took place on Lingfield's all-weather track over 1 mile and 4 furlongs)	Military Order	William Buick	Charlie Appleby	2:27.74
2024	Ambiente Friendly	Callum Shepherd	James Fanshawe	2:24.09
2025	Puppet Master	Ryan Moore	Aidan O'Brien	2:27.43
2026	Maltese Cross	Tom Marquand	William Haggas	2:29:22

== See also ==
- Horse racing in Great Britain
- List of British flat horse races
