= Forli (horse) =

Argentine-bred Thoroughbred racehorse

- Forli's grave at Claiborne Farm
- Sire: Aristophanes
- Grandsire: Hyperion
- Dam: Trevisa
- Damsire: Advocate
- Sex: Stallion
- Foaled: 1963
- Country: Argentina
- Colour: Chestnut
- Breeder: Haras Ojo de Agua
- Owner: Jorge Azevedo; Arthur B. Hancock, Jr.
- Trainer: Juan Lapistoy; Charles E. Whittingham
- Record: 10: 9-1-0

Major wins
- Gran Premio Polla De Potrillos (1966); Gran Premio Jockey Club (1966); Gran Premio Nacional (1966); Gran Premio Carlos Pellegrini (1966); Gran Premio Montevideo (1966); Coronado Handicap (1967)

Awards
- Argentine Horse of the Year (1966)

Forli (1963–1988) was an Argentine Thoroughbred racehorse and sire. He was unbeaten in his native country, winning the Argentine Triple Crown and being named Horse of the Year in 1966. He was imported to the United States in 1967 and won two of his three races before he was retired from racing. He stood as a breeding stallion in Kentucky and had considerable success as a sire of winners: he had a long-term influence on racing through his daughter Special, an influential broodmare. Forli died in 1988.

== Background ==
Forli was a chestnut horse bred in Argentina by Haras Ojo de Agua. He was sired by Aristophanes, a British stallion imported to Argentina after having shown good, but unexceptional form in his native country. He made a great impact as a breeding stallion and was the Leading sire in Argentina in 1960. Forli's dam Trevisa was a successful broodmare and a half sister to La Dogana, whose descendants included Crow. Forli was first raced in the ownership of Jorge Azevedo and was trained in Argentina by Juan Lapistoy.

== Racing career ==
Forli was unbeaten in three races as a juvenile. As a three-year-old Forli won the Argentine Triple Crown, winning the Gran Premio Polla De Potrillos, Gran Premio Jockey Club, and Gran Premio Nacional. When matched against older horse he won Argentina's premier weight-for-age, the Gran Premio Carlos Pellegrini. He ended his South American career unbeaten in seven starts.

In 1967 Forli was bought by Arthur B. Hancock, Jr. of Claiborne Farm for $960,000, and was transferred to the United States where he was trained by Charles E. Whittingham. He won on his North American debut setting a track record of 1:41.2 when winning the Coronado Handicap over 8 1/2 furlongs at Hollywood Park Racetrack in May. Forli then developed leg problems and was pinfired before returning to win an exhibition race at Hollywood in July. He suffered his first and only defeat in the Citation Handicap at Arlington Park when he finished second to Dominar.

== Stud record ==
Forli was retired from racing to become a breeding stallion at Claiborne. He died in 1988 and was buried at Claiborne Farm. His notable progeny included:

- 1969 Special, dam of Nureyev and the grandam of Sadler's Wells
- 1970 Tuerta, dam of Swale
- 1970 Thatch, won St. James's Palace Stakes, July Cup Sussex Stakes
- 1970 Forego, three-time American Horse of the Year
- 1971 Lisadell, won Coronation Stakes
- 1972 Forceten, won Swaps Stakes
- 1972 Excellently, dam of Precisionist
- 1975 Fordham, won Joe McGrath Memorial Stakes
- 1983 Asteroid Field, won Matriarch Stakes
- 1983 Sadeem, won Ascot Gold Cup

== Sire line tree ==
- Forli
  - Home Guard
    - Luigi
  - Forego
  - Thatch
    - Thatching
      - Chaumeire
      - Mansooj
      - Wiganthorpe
      - Tirol
      - Archway
        - Hardy Eustace
      - Shalford
      - Revelation
      - Sugarfoot
    - Final Straw
    - Stifelius
    - Achieved
    - Tanque Verde
    - Tommy Way
    - Shulich
  - Forceten
  - Intrepid Hero
  - Fordham
  - Formidable
    - Forzando
      - Easycall
      - Superior Premium
    - Efisio
    - Chilibang
  - Key To Content
  - Posse
    - Altayan
    - Sheriff's Star
      - Seiun Sky
        - Mayol
    - Linpac West
  - Sadeem

== Pedigree ==
Pedigree of Forli (ARG), chestnut stallion, 1963
| Sire Aristophanes (GB) 1948 | Hyperion (GB); 1930 | Gainsborough | Bayardo |
| Sire Aristophanes (GB) 1948 | Hyperion (GB); 1930 | Gainsborough | Rosedrop |
| Sire Aristophanes (GB) 1948 | Hyperion (GB); 1930 | Selene | Chaucer |
| Sire Aristophanes (GB) 1948 | Hyperion (GB); 1930 | Selene | Serenissima |
| Sire Aristophanes (GB) 1948 | Commotion (GB); 1938 | Mieuxce | Massine |
| Sire Aristophanes (GB) 1948 | Commotion (GB); 1938 | Mieuxce | L'Olivete |
| Sire Aristophanes (GB) 1948 | Commotion (GB); 1938 | Riot | Colorado |
| Sire Aristophanes (GB) 1948 | Commotion (GB); 1938 | Riot | Lady Juror* |
| Dam Trevisa (ARG) 1951 | Advocate (GB); 1940 | Fair Trial | Fairway |
| Dam Trevisa (ARG) 1951 | Advocate (GB); 1940 | Fair Trial | Lady Juror* |
| Dam Trevisa (ARG) 1951 | Advocate (GB); 1940 | Guiding Star | Papyrus |
| Dam Trevisa (ARG) 1951 | Advocate (GB); 1940 | Guiding Star | Ocean Light |
| Dam Trevisa (ARG) 1951 | Veneta (ARG); 1940 | Foxglove | Foxhunter |
| Dam Trevisa (ARG) 1951 | Veneta (ARG); 1940 | Foxglove | Staylace |
| Dam Trevisa (ARG) 1951 | Veneta (ARG); 1940 | Dogaresa | Your Majesty |
| Dam Trevisa (ARG) 1951 | Veneta (ARG); 1940 | Dogaresa | Casiopea (Family 3-b) |

* Forli is inbred 4S x 4D to the mare Lady Juror, meaning that she appears fourth generation on the sire side of his pedigree, and fourth generation on the dam side of his pedigree.
