= Flash of Steel =

Irish-bred Thoroughbred racehorse

- Sire: Kris
- Grandsire: Sharpen Up
- Dam: Spark of Fire
- Damsire: Run the Gantlet
- Sex: Stallion
- Foaled: 10 March 1983
- Country: Ireland
- Colour: Bay
- Breeder: Bertram Firestone
- Owner: Bertram Firestone
- Trainer: Dermot Weld
- Record: 9: 5-0-0

Major wins
- Beresford Stakes (1985); Tetrarch Stakes (1986); Irish 2000 Guineas (1986)

Awards
- Timeform rating 117p (1985), 120 (1986); Top-rated Irish-trained miler (1986)

Flash of Steel (10 March 1983 – 14 January 2013) was an Irish Thoroughbred racehorse and sire. Bred and owned by Bertram Firestone and trained by Dermot Weld he was one of the best two-year-olds in Ireland in 1985 when he won his last three races including the Beresford Stakes. In the following spring he took his winning run to five by taking the Tetrarch Stakes and recording his biggest victory in the Irish 2000 Guineas. He ran unplaced in both The Derby and the Irish Derby and was retired from racing at the end of the year. He stood as a breeding stallion in Ireland, Italy, Australia and Japan but had little success as a sire of winners.

== Background ==
Flash of Steel was a "good-topped, strong-bodied" bay horse with no white markings bred in Ireland by his American owner Bertram Firestone. He was trained throughout his racing career by Dermot Weld.

He was from the first crop of foals sired by Kris an outstanding miler who won fourteen of his sixteen races. Kris went on to sire many other major winners including Unite, Shamshir, Balisada and Oh So Sharp. Flash of Steel's dam Spark of Fire showed little racing ability but was a half-sister to Musical Lark (Matron Stakes), Hartebeest (Prix de la Grotte, ancestor of Rosdhu Queen) and Spark of Life (Ladies Handicap).

== Racing career ==
=== 1985: two-year-old season ===
Flash of Steel made no impact in his first two races, finishing unplaced in maiden races over six and seven furlongs respectively at the Curragh. He was dropped back to six furlongs for a maiden at Naas Racecourse in September, started odds-on favourite, and won by three quarters of a length from Wolf Call after taking the lead in the closing stages. He returned before the end of the month in a minor race over seven furlongs at Down Royal and won in more impressive style. On this occasion he was restrained by his jockey in the early stages, overcame some trouble obtaining a clear run and beat Halo's Sword by one and a half lengths despite being eased down in the closing stages. The colt was moved up in class and distance for his final race of the year, the Group Two Beresford Stakes over one mile at the Curragh. The unbeaten British challenger Robbama started favourite ahead of the Vincent O'Brien-trained Obligato while the other five runners included Hungry Giant (runner-up to Woodman in the Futurity Stakes) and the Michael Stoute-trained Eve's Error. Ridden by Mick Kinane Flash of Steel looked outpaced i the early stages as Dancing Zeta set the pace but began to make progress on the outside in the straight. Despite hanging to the right he took the lead inside the final furlong and drew away to win by two and a half lengths from Eve's Error.

=== 1986: three-year-old season ===
Flash of Steel began his second season in the Tetrarch Stakes over seven furlongs on soft ground at the Curragh in April. Ridden by Kinane he won by three quarters of a length from Equator, to whom he was conceding nine pounds in weight. The 1986 edition of the Irish 2000 Guineas, run on heavy ground at the Curragh on 17 May drew an unusually small field of six, with three Irish-trained colts being matched against three British challengers. The British appeared to have a clear advantage as the Dick Hern-trained Sharrood started favourite ahead of Huntingdale and Green Desert whilst Flash of Steel was the 9/2 fourth choice in the betting alongside Fioravanti. The only other runner was Mr John who had finished fourth in the Tetrarch Stakes. Sharrood set a steady pace with Kinane positioning Flash of Steel towards the rear of the closely grouped field. In the last quarter mile most of the runners began to struggle in the testing conditions but Flash of Steel stayed on strongly, took the lead a furlong out and won by three quarters of a length from Mr John. As in the Beresford Stakes he hung to the right in the closing stages, slightly hampering the runner-up but there was no stewards' inquiry and the result stood.

ON 4 June Flash of Steel was stepped up in distance and started a 25/1 outsider for the 1986 Epsom Derby over one and a half miles. He never looked likely to win but stayed on well in the straight to finish sixth, four lengths behind the winner Shahrastani. He faced Shahrastani again in the Irish Derby at the Curragh on 28 June but after reaching third place in the straight he faded to finish seventh of the eleven runners.

== Assessment ==
In the official International Classification of European two-year-olds for 1985, Flash of Steel was rated on 73, ten pounds behind the top-rated Bakharoff. The independent Timeform organisation gave the colt a rating of 117 p, with the "p" indicating that he was expected to make more than usual improvement. In 1986 he was rated 120 by Timeform, 20 pounds behind their Horse of the Year Dancing Brave. The International Classification concurred, rating him on 120, 21 pounds inferior to Dancing Brave. He was the top-rated Irish-trained horse in the 7 furlongs plus division and the second-best Irish-trained three-year-old colt.

== Stud record ==
Flash of Steel began his career as a breeding stallion at the Irish National Stud in 1987 where he stood at an initial fee of IR£11,000. He later stood in Italy and Australia before being exported to Japan in 1991, where he covered his last mare in 2004. The best of his offspring was probably the filly Nagara Flash, a Grade III winner in Japan.

== Pedigree ==
Pedigree of Flash of Steel (IRE), bay stallion, 1983
Sire Kris (GB) 1976	Sharpen Up (GB); 1969	Atan	Native Dancer
Sire Kris (GB) 1976	Sharpen Up (GB); 1969	Atan	Mixed Marriage
Sire Kris (GB) 1976	Sharpen Up (GB); 1969	Rocchetta	Rockfella
Sire Kris (GB) 1976	Sharpen Up (GB); 1969	Rocchetta	Chambiges
Sire Kris (GB) 1976	Doubly Sure (GB); 1971	Reliance	Tantieme
Sire Kris (GB) 1976	Doubly Sure (GB); 1971	Reliance	Relance
Sire Kris (GB) 1976	Doubly Sure (GB); 1971	Soft Angels	Crepello
Sire Kris (GB) 1976	Doubly Sure (GB); 1971	Soft Angels	Sweet Angel
Dam Spark of Fire (IRE) 1979	Run the Gantlet (USA); 1968	Tom Rolfe	Ribot
Dam Spark of Fire (IRE) 1979	Run the Gantlet (USA); 1968	Tom Rolfe	Pocahontas
Dam Spark of Fire (IRE) 1979	Run the Gantlet (USA); 1968	First Feather	First Landing
Dam Spark of Fire (IRE) 1979	Run the Gantlet (USA); 1968	First Feather	Quill
Dam Spark of Fire (IRE) 1979	Sparkalark (USA); 1970	Cornish Prince	Bold Ruler
Dam Spark of Fire (IRE) 1979	Sparkalark (USA); 1970	Cornish Prince	Teleran
Dam Spark of Fire (IRE) 1979	Sparkalark (USA); 1970	Diamond Ring	Gallant Man
Dam Spark of Fire (IRE) 1979	Sparkalark (USA); 1970	Diamond Ring	Accompanist (Family: 9-f)
