= Thatch (horse) =

American-bred, Irish-trained Thoroughbred racehorse

- Sire: Forli
- Grandsire: Aristophanes
- Dam: Thong
- Damsire: Nantallah
- Sex: Stallion
- Foaled: 30 March 1970
- Country: United States
- Colour: Bay
- Breeder: Claiborne Farm
- Owner: J. A. Mulcahy
- Trainer: Vincent O'Brien
- Record: 9:7-0-0
- Earnings: £40,277

Major wins
- St. James's Palace Stakes (1973); July Cup (1973); Sussex Stakes (1973)

Awards
- Top-rated Irish two-year-old (1972); Timeform Top-rated three-year-old (1973); Timeform rating: 136
- Last updated on 1 September 2022

Thatch (1970–1983) was an American-bred, Irish-trained Thoroughbred racehorse and sire. In a racing career which lasted from spring 1972 until July 1973 he ran nine times and won seven races. As a two-year-old he won three of his four races and was rated one of the best Irish juveniles of the season. In the following year he finished fourth on soft ground in the 2000 Guineas. In the summer he showed the form which led to him being rated the best European horse of his generation, winning the St. James's Palace Stakes, the July Cup and the Sussex Stakes. He was then retired to stud where he had some success as a sire of winners.

== Background ==
Thatch was a strongly built bay horse, standing 16 hands high, with a white star and one white foot, bred by Claiborne Farm in Kentucky. His sire Forli was a champion in his native Argentina before becoming a successful breeding stallion in the United States. His best-known offspring was Thatch's contemporary Forego, the three-time American Horse of the Year. Thatch's dam Thong was a full sister to the 1965 American Horse of the Year Moccasin. After winning five races she was retired to stud where she became a highly influential broodmare. Her descendants included Fairy King, Nureyev, Lisadell, Marinsky, King Pellinore and most importantly Sadler's Wells.

Thatch was bought privately by Jack Mulcahy and was sent to race in Europe. He proved to be the first top-class horse owned by the County Waterford born Mulcahy, whose racing colours of green, white and orange were derived from the Irish tricolour. Thatch was trained by Vincent O'Brien at his Ballydoyle stable in County Tipperary, Ireland.

== Racing career ==
=== 1972: two-year-old season ===
Thatch began his career with three easy wins at the Curragh, starting with the Corrib Maiden Stakes over six furlongs in June. In the following month he was moved up in class and won the Group Three Tyros Stakes over the same course and distance followed by a success over seven furlongs in the Probationers Stakes.

In August he was sent to France to contest the Group One Prix Morny but finished fourth behind Filiberto. He reportedly did not cope well with the journey from Ireland and was not suited by the soft ground. Although he did not race again in 1972, he was officially rated the best horse in Ireland by a margin of six pounds.

=== 1973: three-year-old season ===
On his three-year-old debut, Thatch won the Group Three Vauxhall Trial Stakes over seven furlongs at Phoenix Park Racecourse. On 5 May the colt was sent to England for the first to contest the 2000 Guineas over the Rowley Mile course at Newmarket Racecourse. Ridden by Lester Piggott, he was strongly fancied for the classic, with his main opposition expected to come from the French-trained colt Targowice. Racing on soft ground, he finished fourth of the eighteen runners behind the 50/1 outsider Mon Fils, with O'Brien blaming his colt's defeat on the rain-softened ground.

By the summer, the dry weather led to firm, fast ground in England and Thatch returned in June for the St James's Palace Stakes over one mile at Royal Ascot. He won by fifteen lengths from his only opponent, Owen Dudley, a colt who had previously won the Dante Stakes at York and the Diomed Stakes at Epsom. In the following month he was moved down in distance to contest the July Cup against specialist sprinters over six furlongs at Newmarket's July course. Ridden as usual by Piggott, he started 4/5 favourite and won by three lengths from the Royal Ascot winners Pitskelly (Jersey Stakes) and Balliol (Cork and Orrery Stakes). At the end of the month Thatch returned to the mile for the Sussex Stakes at Goodwood Racecourse, which at that time was restricted to three' and four-year-olds. He won by three lengths from Jacinth, a filly who had been rated the best British two-year-old of either sex in 1972.

Later in the season, Thatch was withdrawn from engagements in both the Queen Elizabeth II Stakes and the Prix du Moulin, as his connections did not wish to run the colt on soft ground. At the end of the season he was syndicated at a valuation of £1m and retired to stud.

== Assessment ==
Thatch was the highest rated two-year-old of 1972 in Ireland. At the end of the following season Timeform awarded the colt a rating of 136, making him the highest rated three-year-old in Europe. The only horse to surpass Thatch's rating for 1973 were his two-year-old stable companion Apalachee (also owned by Mulcahy) and the four-year-old Prix de l'Arc de Triomphe winner Rheingold, both of whom were assessed at 137.

In their book A Century of Champions, based on a modified version of the Timeform system, John Randall and Tony Morris rated Thatch the best British or Irish-trained horse of his generation and the twelfth-best Irish racehorse of the 20th century. He was also placed twentieth in their list of the century's best sprinters.

== Stud career ==
Thatch had some success as a breeding stallion, siring good winners over a variety of distances including Thatching, Achieved, Final Straw (four Group race wins including the Champagne Stakes), Tommy Way (Derby Italiano, Gran Premio di Milano) and Shulich (Gran Premio di Milano). He was also the damsire of the 1986 Epsom Derby winner Shahrastani.

== Sire line tree ==
- Thatch
  - Thatching
    - Chaumeire
    - Mansooj
    - Wiganthorpe
    - Tirol
    - Archway
      - Hardy Eustace
    - Shalford
    - Revelation
    - Sugarfoot
  - Final Straw
  - Stifelius
  - Achieved
  - Tanque Verde
  - Tommy Way
  - Shulich

== Pedigree ==
Pedigree of Thatch (USA), bay stallion, 1970
Sire Forli (ARG) 1963	Aristophanes (GB); 1948	Hyperion	Gainsborough
Sire Forli (ARG) 1963	Aristophanes (GB); 1948	Hyperion	Selene
Sire Forli (ARG) 1963	Aristophanes (GB); 1948	Commotion	Mieuxce
Sire Forli (ARG) 1963	Aristophanes (GB); 1948	Commotion	Riot
Sire Forli (ARG) 1963	Trevisa (ARG); 1951	Advocate	Fair Trial
Sire Forli (ARG) 1963	Trevisa (ARG); 1951	Advocate	Guiding Star
Sire Forli (ARG) 1963	Trevisa (ARG); 1951	Veneta	Foxglove
Sire Forli (ARG) 1963	Trevisa (ARG); 1951	Veneta	Dogaresa
Dam Thong (USA) 1964	Nantallah (USA); 1953	Nasrullah	Nearco
Dam Thong (USA) 1964	Nantallah (USA); 1953	Nasrullah	Mumtaz Begum
Dam Thong (USA) 1964	Nantallah (USA); 1953	Shimmer	Flares
Dam Thong (USA) 1964	Nantallah (USA); 1953	Shimmer	Broad Ripple
Dam Thong (USA) 1964	Rough Shod (GB); 1944	Gold Bridge	Golden Boss
Dam Thong (USA) 1964	Rough Shod (GB); 1944	Gold Bridge	Flying Diadem
Dam Thong (USA) 1964	Rough Shod (GB); 1944	Dalmary	Blandford
Dam Thong (USA) 1964	Rough Shod (GB); 1944	Dalmary	Simons Shoes (Family:5-h)
