= Liam Browne =

Irish horse racing trainer (1937–2026)

Liam Browne (April 1937 – 25 April 2026) was an Irish racehorse trainer.

== Life and career ==
Browne was born in April 1937. He trained a number of champion horses, including Dara Monarch, the winner of the 1982 Irish 2,000 Guineas, and the St James's Palace Stakes. He also trained Mr Kildare, the winner of the 1978 Sun Alliance Hurdle, and Slaney Idol, winner of the 1980 Supreme Novices' Hurdle.

He was also known for mentoring jockey Mick Kinane.

Browne died on 25 April 2026, at the age of 89.
