= Buster Parnell =

Irish jockey

Ryan Farnham "Buster" Parnell (c. 1934 – 17 September 2017) was an Irish jockey who competed in Flat racing. Parnell was Irish flat racing Champion Jockey in 1969 and won three Irish Classic Races. He was born in Fulham and rode his first winner in 1950. He subsequently served in the Royal Air Force before returning to horse racing and becoming champion jockey in Denmark. He spent the majority of his career in Ireland. His son, David Parnell, was also a jockey.

He died in Copenhagen in September 2017, aged 83.
