= Harry Carr (jockey) =

British jockey

Personal information
- Born: 30 November 1916 Clifton, Cumbria, England
- Died: 19 October 1985 (aged 68)
- Occupation: Jockey

Horse racing career
- Sport: Horse racing
- Career wins: 1,363

Major racing wins
- British Classic Race wins: 1000 Guineas Stakes (1955); Derby Stakes (1959); Oaks Stakes (1955); St Leger Stakes (1955, 1958, 1962); Other major race wins: Coronation Stakes (1955); Dewhurst Stakes (1950); Goodwood Cup (1956, 1962); July Cup (1955, 1961); King George VI and Queen Elizabeth Stakes (1959); Lockinge Stakes (1958, 1959); Middle Park Stakes (1950); Nunthorpe Stakes (1947, 1960); St. James's Palace Stakes (1951, 1959); Timeform Gold Cup (1963); Yorkshire Oaks (1957)

Significant horses
- Alcide, Hethersett, Meld, Pall Mall, Pappa Fourway, Parthia, Zarathustra

William Henry Carr (1916–1985) was a multiple British Classic-winning jockey, who rode for both Queen Elizabeth II and her father King George VI, and became one of the most successful jockeys in England in the 1950s and early 60s.

== Early life ==
William Henry 'Harry' Carr was born on 30 November 1916 in Clifton, Cumbria, on the estate of the Earl of Lonsdale, for whose racehorse trainer, Robert Ward 'Bob' Armstrong, his father Robert was travelling head lad. The family moved with Armstrong when he relocated to Middleham and when he was old enough, Harry became an apprentice jockey to the trainer.

== Career ==
He rode his first winner, Knight's Folly, on 21 July 1931 at Ayr and went on to record seven victories in that year. At the age of 16, he spent the winter in India riding for the Royal Calcutta Turf Club, winning his first important race - the £3,000 Kashmir Cup - on a horse called Filter, which had been previously trained by Armstrong. He rode 20 winners in his second full season in England, before returning to India, where he was becoming a leading jockey.

=== 1940s ===
The royal silks, in which Carr often rode

He joined a cavalry regiment during the war, returning home to settle in Middleham. Post-war, he initially found it difficult to find rides. His early successes in England had been forgotten, and his record in India was largely unknown, resulting in owners overlooking him. However, he was eventually recommended to replace Doug Smith as jockey to King George VI, taking up the role on 1 September 1946, at the age of 30. It was arranged that Carr would ride the King's Newmarket trained horses, while Gordon Richards would ride those trained at Beckhampton.

With better patronage, he came fifth in the Jockeys' Championship of 1947 with 81 winners, among which were wins in the Gimcrack Stakes and Royal Lodge Stakes on Black Tarquin (trained by Cecil Boyd-Rochfort for William Woodward Sr.), the Nunthorpe Stakes on Como, and the Ayr Gold Cup on Kilbelin.

He rode the favourite, Clarion III in the 1948 season-opening Lincoln Handicap, heading the largest ever field assembled in a British flat racing of 58, but was beaten when the horse didn't stay the distance. Not long afterwards, in June 1948, he broke his leg falling off Monjon at Birmingham Racecourse. The King paid for a bone graft in a London clinic, but the absence was costly for Carr's career. Having won on Black Tarquin in that year's Lingfield Derby Trial and ridden him in the Derby as well, Carr then missed winning rides on the horse in the St James's Palace Stakes and St Leger. Edgar Britt deputised on both occasions.

=== 1950s ===
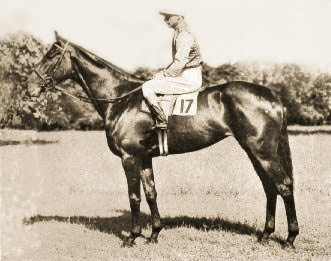
Harry Carr on Triple Crown winning mare, Meld

It was not until 1955 that he won a Classic himself, when he took the Fillies' Triple Crown with the Boyd-Rochfort-trained Meld for Lady Wernher, as well as the Coronation Stakes at Royal Ascot.

In the meantime, the early 50s saw other successes. On Big Dipper he won the 1950 Coventry Stakes, July Stakes, Champagne Stakes and Middle Park Stakes. With Turco II, he won the 1950 Dewhurst Stakes and then the following season's St James's Palace Stakes at Royal Ascot. He also won that year's Wokingham Stakes on Donore. Osborne was another successful horse for him, giving him victories in the 1954 Goodwood Stakes and Doncaster Cup.

But 1955 was an especially big year. Besides the Triple Crown on Meld, he won the Coventry Stakes on Ratification (on whom he also won the 1956 Greenham Stakes); the Festival Stakes, King's Stand, July Cup and Diadem Stakes on Pappa Fourway; and the Gordon Stakes on Manati, who also gave him a win the 1956 Old Newton Cup.

Other important horses in these years were Atlas (Dee Stakes and Doncaster Cup in 1956), Almeria (Ribblesdale Stakes, Yorkshire Oaks and Park Hill Stakes in 1957) and Doutelle (1957 Cumberland Lodge Stakes, 1958 John Porter Stakes and 1958 Ormonde Stakes). Alcide gave him his first serious chance of a Derby win when, after winning the 1958 Lingfield Derby Trial by a dozen lengths, he was made ante-post favourite for the Epsom classic. But shortly afterwards, he was said to have been "got at" by dopers and was taken out of the race. Carr would later win the 1959 King George) on him.

He made up for the Derby disappointment the following year. Parthia, on whom he had won the Dee Stakes at Chester and the Lingfield Derby Trial, was drawn unfavourably in stall one at Epsom, but won by a length and a half from Fidalgo, ridden by Joe Mercer, who was Carr's son-in-law via his daughter Anne.

Pall Mall, trained by Boyd-Rochfort for the Queen, gave him a win at the 1957 Royal meeting (Norfolk Stakes) and then in the first two runnings of the Lockinge Stakes in 1958 and 1959. Unfortunately, he had turned down the ride on the horse in the 1958 2000 Guineas, opting instead for stablemate (and favourite), Bald Eagle. In the event, the ride went to Doug Smith, and Pall Mall won by half a length.

=== Later career and retirement ===
In 1962, he again found himself on the favourite for the Derby - Hethersett. However, in a notorious incident, his rival Romulus fell six furlongs from home, bringing down others, resulting in the death of one horse and hospitalisation of four jockeys. Carr was one of them, in his case suffering from a broken shoulder. The injury was the beginning of the end of his career. In July 1964, he retired, on the advice of doctors, to manage Genesis Green Stud in Wickhambrook near Newmarket, which he had founded in 1958. He published his autobiography, Queen's Jockey, in 1966 and died on 19 October 1985 at the age of 68.

== Major wins ==
(United Kingdom) Great Britain

- 1000 Guineas Stakes - Meld (1955)
- Coronation Stakes - Meld (1955)
- Derby Stakes - Parthia (1959)
- Dewhurst Stakes - Turco (1950)
- Goodwood Cup - (2) - Zarathustra (1956), Sagacity (1962)
- July Cup - (2) - Pappa Fourway (1955), Galivanter (1961)
- King George VI and Queen Elizabeth Stakes - Alcide (1959)
- Lockinge Stakes - (2) - Pall Mall (1958), Pall Mall (1959)
- Middle Park Stakes - Big Dipper (1950)
- Nunthorpe Stakes - (2) - Como (1947), Bleep-Bleep (1960)
- Oaks Stakes - Meld (1955)
- St. James's Palace Stakes - (2) - Turco (1951), Above Suspicion (1959)
- St Leger Stakes - (3) - Meld (1955), Alcide (1958), Hethersett (1962)
- Timeform Gold Cup (now Vertem Futurity Trophy) - Pushful (1963)
- Yorkshire Oaks - Almeria (1957)

== See also ==
- List of jockeys
