= Eric Eldin =

British jockey and racehorse trainer (1932–2021)

Eric Eldin (31 July 1932 – 2 July 2021) was a British jockey and horse trainer who competed in flat racing.

Eric Eldin was born in Newland, Yorkshire, and began his horse racing career as an apprentice jockey at the stables of Ryan Jarvis. Eldin's first winner came at Leicester Racecourse in May 1950 and he rode the winners of 879 races in a career lasting until 1979. His biggest race win was in 1968 when Front Row won the Irish 1,000 Guineas. After retiring as a jockey he took up training racehorses at Newmarket and trained 155 winners between 1980 and 1991.
