= Greenlands Stakes =

Flat horse race in Ireland

- Class: Group 2
- Location: Curragh Racecourse; County Kildare, Ireland
- Race type: Flat / Thoroughbred
- Sponsor: Weatherbys Ireland
- Website: Curragh

Race information
- Distance: 6f (1,207 metres)
- Surface: Turf
- Track: Straight
- Qualification: Four-years-old and up
- Weight: 9 st 5 lb; Allowances; 3 lb for fillies and mares Penalties; 3 lb for G1 winners* * since 1 September last year
- Purse: €112,800 (2023); 1st: €70,800

Greenlands Stakes
2026
Comanche Brave	Big Gossey	James's Delight

Previous years
2025
James's Delight	Lethal Levi	Big Gossey
2024
Mitbaahy	Regional	Ano Syra
2023
Art Power	Big Gossey	Ano Syra
2022
Brad The Brief	Mooneista	A Case Of You
2021
Gustavus Weston	Make A Challenge	Sonaiyla

2020-2011
2020
Speak In Colours	Forever In Dreams	Buffer Zone
2019
Mr Lupton	Speak In Colours	Gordon Lord Byron
2018
Merchant Navy	Spirit of Valor	Tasleet
2017
Gordon Lord Byron	Only Mine	Suedois
2016
Mobsta	Flight Risk	Dick Whittington
2015
Mustajeeb	Maarek	Majestic Queen
2014
Slade Power	Maarek	An Saighdiur
2013
Hitchens	Reply	Slade Power
2012
Tiddliwinks	Jimmy Styles	The Reaper
2011
Hitchens	Tiddliwinks	Santo Padre

2010-2001
2010
Markab	Snaefell	Alfred Nobel
2009
Utmost Respect	Jumbajukiba	Icelandic
2008
Astronomer Royal	Abraham Lincoln	Snaefell
2007
Benbaun	Moss Vale	Theann
2006
Moss Vale	Moon Unit	Miss Sally
2005
Moon Unit	Moss Vale	The Trader
2004
The Kiddykid	Arakan	Ringmoor Down
2003
Miss Emma	Captain Rio	Red Carpet
2002
Tiger Royal	Tendulkar	One Won One
2001
Final Exam	One Won One	Juniper

2000-1991
2000
Namid	Social Harmony	Rossini
1999
Eastern Purple	Gaelic Storm	One Won One
1998
Strike Hard	Lady Alexander	Lidanna
1997
Burden Of Proof	Catch The Blues	Lucayan Prince
1996
Lidanna	Catch The Blues	Nashcash
1995
Nautical Pet	Desert Style	America's Cup
1994
College Chapel	The Puzzler	Midhish
1993
College Chapel	Pernilla	Street Rebel
1992
Street Rebel	Maledetto	Chicarica
1991
Archway	Mr Brooks	Reference Light

1990-1988
1990
Duck And Dive	A Prayer For Wings	Milieu
1989
Puissance	Big Shuffle	Young Hal
1988
Big Shuffle	Totem	Noora Abu

The Greenlands Stakes is a Group 2 flat horse race in Ireland open to thoroughbreds aged four years or older. It is run at the Curragh over a distance of 6 furlongs (1,207 metres), and it is scheduled to take place each year in May.

The event is named after Greenlands, the area of the Curragh plain where the racecourse is located. It is held on the same afternoon as the Irish 2,000 Guineas. Prior to 2015 it was also open to three-year-olds and was contested at Group 3 level.

== Records ==
Most successful horse since 1950 (2 wins):

- College Chapel – 1993, 1994
- Hitchens - 2011, 2013

Leading jockey since 1950 (6 wins):

- Lester Piggott – Home Guard (1973), Boone's Cabin (1975), Golden Thatch (1979), Archway (1991), College Chapel (1993, 1994)

Leading trainer since 1950 (13 wins):

- Vincent O'Brien – King's Jester (1958), Abergwaun (1972), Home Guard (1973), Saritamer (1974), Boone's Cabin (1975), Golden Thatch (1979), Drama (1981), Belted Earl (1982), Exhibitioner (1985), Puissance (1989), Archway (1991), College Chapel (1993, 1994)

== Winners since 1983 ==
Year	Winner	Age	Jockey	Trainer	Time
1983	Curravilla	3	Pat Eddery	John Oxx
1984	Reesh	3	Tony Ives	Bill O'Gorman
1985	Exhibitioner	3	Pat Eddery	Vincent O'Brien
1986	Rustic Amber	3	Pat Eddery	John Oxx	1:22.00
1987	Sylvan Express	4	Walter Swinburn	Philip Mitchell	1:10.50
1988	Big Shuffle	4	Michael Kinane	Dermot Weld	1:12.20
1989	Puissance	3	John Reid	Vincent O'Brien	1:12.40
1990	Duck and Dive (Note: A Prayer for Wings finished first in 1990, but he was relegated to second place following a stewards' inquiry)	3	Pat Eddery	Richard Hannon Sr.	1:11.10
1991	Archway	3	Lester Piggott	Vincent O'Brien	1:12.20
1992	Street Rebel	4	Richard Hughes	Noel Meade	1:14.80
1993	College Chapel	3	Lester Piggott	Vincent O'Brien	1:16.10
1994	College Chapel	4	Lester Piggott	Vincent O'Brien	1:17.20
1995	Nautical Pet	3	Michael Kinane	Dermot Weld	1:13.00
1996	Lidanna	3	Michael Kinane	David Hanley	1:12.60
1997	Burden of Proof	5	Johnny Murtagh	Charles O'Brien	1:15.20
1998	Strike Hard	3	Johnny Murtagh	John Oxx	1:12.50
1999	Eastern Purple	4	Frankie Dettori	Kevin Ryan	1:12.20
2000	Namid	4	Johnny Murtagh	John Oxx	1:12.50
2001	Final Exam	4	Pat Smullen	Dermot Weld	1:14.20
2002	Tiger Royal	6	Niall McCullagh	Dermot Weld	1:17.70
2003	Miss Emma	3	Tadhg O'Shea	Michael Halford	1:12.80
2004	The Kiddykid	4	Jamie Spencer	David Evans	1:11.80
2005	Moon Unit	4	Johnny Murtagh	Harry Rogers	1:14.70
2006	Moss Vale	5	Kieren Fallon	David Nicholls	1:18.30
2007	Benbaun	6	Pat Smullen	Mark Wallace	1:10.10
2008	Astronomer Royal	4	Colm O'Donoghue	Aidan O'Brien	1:12.49
2009	Utmost Respect	5	Declan McDonogh	Richard Fahey	1:16.90
2010	Markab	7	Pat Cosgrave	Henry Candy	1:10.86
2011	Hitchens	6	Fran Berry	David Barron	1:11.44
2012	Tiddliwinks	6	Pat Smullen	Kevin Ryan	1:11.87
2013	Hitchens	8	Johnny Murtagh	David Barron	1:11.76
2014	Slade Power	5	Wayne Lordan	Edward Lynam	1:17.15
2015	Mustajeeb	4	Pat Smullen	Dermot Weld	1:12.15
2016	Mobsta	4	Pat Smullen	Mick Channon	1:16.20
2017	Gordon Lord Byron	9	Chris Hayes	Tom Hogan	1:15.15
2018	Merchant Navy	4	Ryan Moore	Aidan O'Brien	1:11.82
2019	Mr Lupton	6	Jamie Spencer	Richard Fahey	1:11.51
2020	Speak in Colours (Note: The 2020 race was run in June due to the COVID-19 pandemic in the Republic of Ireland)	5	Shane Crosse	Joseph O'Brien	1:11.22
2021	Gustavus Weston	5	Gary Carroll	Joseph G Murphy	1:13.06
2022	Brad the Brief	5	William Buick	Hugo Palmer	1:12.12
2023	Art Power	6	Oisin Murphy	Tim Easterby	1:12.02
2024	Mitbaahy	5	Jamie Spencer	Charles Hills	1:12.50
2025	James's Delight	4	Oisin Murphy	Clive Cox	1:11.52
2026	Comanche Brave	4	Ryan Moore	Donnacha O'Brien	1:09.66

== Earlier winners ==
- 1950: Turkish Prince
- 1951: Owen o' Cork
- 1952: Prince of Fairfield
- 1953: Starial
- 1954: Standing Holly
- 1955: Away Home / By-Passed (Note: The 1955 race was a dead-heat and has joint winners)
- 1956: Who You
- 1957: Persian
- 1958: King's Jester
- 1959: Renegade
- 1960: Mutara
- 1961: Enamoured
- 1962: Ahascragh
- 1963: Red Slipper
- 1964: Victoria Quay
- 1965: Majority Blue
- 1966: Washington
- 1967: Cambusdoon
- 1968: Polar Gold
- 1969: Desert Call
- 1970: Everyday
- 1971: Cinerama Two
- 1972: Abergwaun
- 1973: Home Guard
- 1974: Saritamer
- 1975: Boone's Cabin
- 1976: Petipa
- 1977: Balgaddy
- 1978: Ballad Rock
- 1979: Golden Thatch
- 1980: Jasmine Star
- 1981: Drama
- 1982: Belted Earl

== See also ==
- Horse racing in Ireland
- List of Irish flat horse races
