= Zino =

Greek social networking website

- Screenshot of Zino frontpage
- Website type: Social Networking
- Available in: Greek
- Headquarters: Athens, Greece
- Owner: Kamibu
- Creators: Dionysis Zindros, Chris Pappas, and Aleksis Brezas
- Website: Zino.gr
- Commercial: Yes
- Registration: Optional
- Launched: November 29, 2007
- Current status: Shut down due to no maintenance.

Zino was a Greek social networking website. In 2009, it was ranked one of the top Greek social destinations.

== History ==
Zino started as a continuation of a news-focused Greek network, chit-chat.gr, which was established in 2005, and eventually replaced it. Three codenames were publicly announced for the launched versions, Reloaded, the first version announced, Phoenix, the version that established it as a social network in Greece, and lastly Revolution, the current version.

Product name	Version codename	Date launched
Zino	Revolution	August 11, 2010
Zino	Phoenix	July 16, 2008
Zino	Reloaded	November 29, 2007
Chit-Chat	Reloaded	November 27, 2006
Chit-Chat	(unknown)	May 30, 2005

== Features ==
=== User profiles ===
Each user has a user profile in the form of http://username.zino.gr/, where username is a chosen nickname by the user. The user profile lists several user details, among others their gender, age, and other personal information. It also exhibits several user-generated sections of content such as recent journals, polls, answers, photos, and the user's music preferences.

=== Photo albums ===
The users are given the opportunity to upload photos of themselves or other pictures they have taken to their user profile. These pictures are separated into albums, which the user can specify. Zino claims about 140,000 photos.

=== Friends ===
Like in most social networks, users can add people as their friends. Their friends are listed on their user profile accordingly.

=== Journals ===
Each user has a personal collection of articles that they can publish under the user profile. This collection is called "journals", and is publicly available for anyone to read.

=== Questions and answers ===
Each user is asked several personal questions while using the web application, allowing him to provide an answer or skip the question. These answers are then publicly available on the user's profile for other users to see, a feature that allows the owner to reveal numerous details about themselves.

=== Polls ===
Users are provided with the ability to raise a question on their user profile, which other users can then answer. This feature is available through polls, for which the user must specify a question and the possible answers. Commentary is furthermore available on poll pages after their creation.

== Criticism ==
=== Greeklish ===
Zino has no regulations over the use of Greeklish. This has yielded to the extensive use of Greeklish, making it hard to read for people not familiar with the language. This policy of the website has been heavily criticized. Various campaigns have sprung to support or defend the usage of Greeklish with the website over time.

=== Data retention ===
Another controversy of the website was the inability to delete user accounts, but this feature was later added after the users' request. The inability to remove comments after they have been posted, a feature also long requested by users, still remains a controversy.
