= Alcide (horse) =

British-bred Thoroughbred racehorse

- Sire: Alycidon
- Grandsire: Donatello
- Dam: Chenille
- Damsire: King Salmon
- Sex: Stallion
- Foaled: 1955
- Country: Great Britain
- Colour: Bay
- Breeder: Sir Humphrey de Trafford
- Owner: Sir Humphrey de Trafford
- Trainer: Cecil Boyd-Rochfort
- Record: 12: 8 - ? - ?
- Earnings: £56,042

Major wins
- Horris Hill Stakes (1957); Chester Vase (1958); Lingfield Derby Trial (1958); Great Voltigeur Stakes (1958); St. Leger Stakes (1958); K. George VI & Q. Elizabeth Stakes (1959)

Awards
- Timeform rating: 136
- Last updated on 31 May 2009

Alcide (1955–1973) was a British Thoroughbred racehorse. It is widely believed that Alcide would have won the 1958 Epsom Derby had not probable foul play prevented him from running. A form line through Nagami, who was third in the Derby, gives credibility to the theory that a fully fit Alcide would have won the race. During this period there was an alarming amount of apparent villainy in racing and it seems likely that the broken rib that Alcide sustained in his stable after he had won the Lingfield Derby Trial was deliberate.

As a two-year-old Alcide had won the Horris Hill Stakes at Newbury Racecourse and his first success in his second season was in the Chester Vase. He then romped home in the Lingfield Derby Trial and after he had recovered from his injury he won the Great Voltigeur Stakes by 12 lengths and the St. Leger by eight. He was held up in his preparation for the Ascot Gold Cup the following season, but even so was only just beaten by Wallaby II. Six weeks later he won the King George VI and Queen Elizabeth Stakes and retired to stud as the winner of eight races worth £56,042.

== Stud career ==
Alcide's stud career was reasonably successful with many of his sons exported to Australasia including Approval, Alderney, Alfonso, Atilla, Colours Flying, Flagon, Gatekeeper, Mironton, Oncidium, Persian Garden II and Swallowtail II. Another son Remandwas a good racehorse who was exported to Japan.
