= Irish 2,000 Guineas =

Flat horse race in Ireland

- Class: Group 1
- Location: Curragh Racecourse; County Kildare, Ireland
- Inaugurated: 1921
- Race type: Flat / Thoroughbred
- Sponsor: Tattersalls
- Website: Curragh

Race information
- Distance: 1 mile (1,609 metres)
- Surface: Turf
- Track: Right-handed
- Qualification: Three-year-olds excluding geldings
- Weight: 9 st 2 lb Allowances; 3 lb for fillies
- Purse: €460,000 (2024); 1st: €285,000

Irish 2,000 Guineas
2026
Gstaad	Distant Storm	Pacific Avenue

Previous years
2025
Field Of Gold	Cosmic Year	Hotazhell
2024
Rosallion	Haatem	River Tiber
2023
Paddington	Cairo	Hi Royal
2022
Native Trail	New Energy	Imperial Fighter
2021
Mac Swiney	Poetic Flare	Van Gogh

2020-2011
2020
Siskin	Vatican City	Lope Y Fernandez
2019
Phoenix Of Spain	Too Darn Hot	Decrypt
2018
Romanised	U S Navy Flag	Gustav Klimt
2017
Churchill	Thunder Snow	Irishcorrespondent
2016
Awtaad	Galileo Gold	Blue De Vega
2015
Gleneagles	Endless Drama	Ivawood
2014
Kingman	Shifting Power	Mustajeeb
2013
Magician	Gale Force Ten	Trading Leather
2012
Power	Foxtrot Romeo	Reply
2011
Roderic O'Connor	Dubawi Gold	Oracle

2010-2001
2010
Canford Cliffs	Free Judgement	Viscount Nelson
2009
Mastercraftsman	Rayeni	Soul City
2008
Henrythenavigator	New Approach	Stubbs Art
2007
Cockney Rebel	Creachadoir	He's A Decoy
2006
Araafa	George Washington	Decado
2005
Dubawi	Oratorio	Democratic Deficit
2004
Bachelor Duke	Azamour	Grey Swallow
2003
Indian Haven	France	Tout Seul
2002
Rock Of Gibraltar	Century City	Della Francesca
2001
Black Minnaloushe	Mozart	Minardi

2000-1991
2000
Bachir	Giant's Causeway	Cape Town
1999
Saffron Walden	Enrique	Orpen
1998
Desert Prince	Fa-Eq	Second Empire
1997
Desert King	Verglas	Romanov
1996
Spinning World	Rainbow Blues	Beauchamp King
1995
Spectrum	Adjareli	Bahri
1994
Turtle Island	Guided Tour	Ridgewood Ben
1993
Barathea	Fatherland	Massyar
1992
Rodrigo De Triano	Ezzoud	Brief Truce
1991
Fourstars Allstar	Star Of Gdansk	Lycius

1990-1988
1990
Tirol	Royal Academy	Lotus Pool
1989
Shaadi	Great Commotion	Distant Relative
1988
Prince Of Birds	Caerwent	Intimidate

The Irish 2,000 Guineas is a Group 1 flat horse race in Ireland open to three-year-old thoroughbred colts and fillies. It is run at the Curragh over a distance of 1 mile (1,609 metres), and it is scheduled to take place each year in May.

== History ==
The event was established in 1921, a year before the launch of the Irish 1,000 Guineas. The inaugural running was won by Soldennis.

It is Ireland's equivalent of the 2,000 Guineas, and in recent years it has taken place three weeks after that race. The field usually includes horses which previously contested the English version, and nine have achieved victory in both events. The first was Right Tack in 1969, and the most recent was Churchill in 2017.

The leading horses from the Irish 2,000 Guineas often go on to compete in the following month's St. James's Palace Stakes. The most recent to win both races was Paddington in 2023.

== Records ==
Leading jockey (5 wins):

- Tommy Burns Sr. – Soldennis (1921), Soldumeno (1923), Cornfield (1939), Grand Weather (1947), Beau Sabreur (1948)
- Martin Quirke – Salisbury (1929), Glannarg (1930), Museum (1935), Nearchus (1938), Khosro (1941)

Leading trainer (13 wins):

- Aidan O'Brien – Desert King (1997), Saffron Walden (1999), Black Minnaloushe (2001), Rock of Gibraltar (2002), Henrythenavigator (2008), Mastercraftsman (2009), Roderic O'Connor (2011), Power (2012), Magician (2013), Gleneagles (2015), Churchill (2017), Paddington (2023), Gstaad (2026)

Leading owner since 1950 (12 wins): (includes part ownership)

- Sue Magnier – Saffron Walden (1999), Black Minnaloushe (2001), Rock of Gibraltar (2002), Henrythenavigator (2008), Mastercraftsman (2009), Roderic O'Connor (2011), Power (2012), Magician (2013), Gleneagles (2015), Churchill (2017), Paddington (2023), Gstaad (2026)

== Winners since 1962 ==
Year	Winner	Jockey	Trainer	Owner	Time
1962	Arctic Storm	Bill Williamson	John Oxx senior	Mrs E. Carroll
1963	Linacre	Paeder Matthews	Paddy Prendergast	Lord Ennisdale
1964	Santa Claus	Willie Burke	Mick Rogers	John Ismay
1965	Green Banner	N. Brennan	Kevin Kerr	B. Kerr
1966	Paveh	T. P. Burns	T. Ainsworth	P. Widener
1967	Atherstone Wood (Note: Kingfisher finished first in 1967, but he was relegated to second place after a stewards' inquiry)	Buster Parnell	Stephen Quirke	S. O'Flaherty
1968	Mistigo	Buster Parnell	Stephen Quirke	F. Feeney
1969	Right Tack	Geoff Lewis	John Sutcliffe Jr.	Jim Brown	1:48.60
1970	Decies	Lester Piggott	Bernard van Cutsem	Nelson Bunker Hunt	1:38.30
1971	King's Company	Freddy Head	Willie Robinson	Bertram Firestone	1:37.50
1972	Ballymore	Christy Roche	Paddy Prendergast	Meg Mullion	1:47.70
1973	Sharp Edge	Joe Mercer	Dick Hern	Jakie Astor	1:45.80
1974	Furry Glen	George McGrath	Seamus McGrath	P. McGrath	1:48.00
1975	Grundy	Pat Eddery	Peter Walwyn	Carlo Vittadini	1:47.20
1976	Northern Treasure	Gabriel Curran	Kevin Prendergast	A. D. Brennan	1:42.80
1977	Pampapaul	Gianfranco Dettori	Stuart Murless	Hans Paul	1:41.90
1978	Jaazeiro	Lester Piggott	Vincent O'Brien	Robert Sangster	1:39.35
1979	Dickens Hill	Tony Murray	Mick O'Toole	Mrs Jean-Pierre Binet	1:50.60
1980	Nikoli	Christy Roche	Paddy Prendergast	3rd Earl of Iveagh	1:40.00
1981	Kings Lake	Pat Eddery	Vincent O'Brien	Mrs Jean-Pierre Binet	1:47.70
1982	Dara Monarch	Michael Kinane	Liam Browne	Mrs Liam Browne	1:41.80
1983	Wassl	Tony Murray	John Dunlop	Ahmed Al Maktoum	1:52.00
1984	Sadler's Wells	George McGrath	Vincent O'Brien	Robert Sangster	1:38.20
1985	Triptych	Christy Roche	David O'Brien	Alan Clore	1:42.10
1986	Flash of Steel	Michael Kinane	Dermot Weld	Bertram Firestone	1:53.40
1987	Don't Forget Me	Willie Carson	Richard Hannon Sr.	James Horgan	1:38.00
1988	Prince of Birds	Declan Gillespie	Vincent O'Brien	Robert Sangster	1:39.00
1989	Shaadi	Walter Swinburn	Michael Stoute	Sheikh Mohammed	1:37.50
1990	Tirol	Pat Eddery	Richard Hannon Sr.	John Horgan	1:39.20
1991	Fourstars Allstar	Mike Smith	Leo O'Brien	Bomze / DiLeo	1:38.60
1992	Rodrigo de Triano	Lester Piggott	Peter Chapple-Hyam	Robert Sangster	1:41.70
1993	Barathea	Michael Roberts	Luca Cumani	Sheikh Mohammed	1:43.00
1994	Turtle Island	John Reid	Peter Chapple-Hyam	Robert Sangster	1:50.10
1995	Spectrum	John Reid	Peter Chapple-Hyam	Lord Weinstock	1:40.30
1996	Spinning World	Cash Asmussen	Jonathan Pease	Niarchos Family	1:38.80
1997	Desert King	Christy Roche	Aidan O'Brien	Michael Tabor	1:38.30
1998	Desert Prince	Olivier Peslier	David Loder	Lucayan Stud	1:35.80
1999	Saffron Walden	Olivier Peslier	Aidan O'Brien	Sue Magnier	1:38.10
2000	Bachir	Frankie Dettori	Saeed bin Suroor	Godolphin	1:39.80
2001	Black Minnaloushe	Johnny Murtagh	Aidan O'Brien	Sue Magnier	1:41.40
2002	Rock of Gibraltar	Michael Kinane	Aidan O'Brien	Ferguson / Magnier	1:47.30
2003	Indian Haven	John Egan	Paul D'Arcy	Gleeson / Smith / Conway	1:41.50
2004	Bachelor Duke	Seb Sanders	James Toller	Exors of Duke of Devonshire	1:40.00
2005	Dubawi	Frankie Dettori	Saeed bin Suroor	Godolphin	1:41.60
2006	Araafa	Alan Munro	Jeremy Noseda	Al Homaizi / Al Sagar	1:49.80
2007	Cockney Rebel	Olivier Peslier	Geoff Huffer	Phil Cunningham	1:36.10
2008	Henrythenavigator	Johnny Murtagh	Aidan O'Brien	Sue Magnier	1:39.63
2009	Mastercraftsman	Johnny Murtagh	Aidan O'Brien	Smith / Magnier / Tabor	1:48.16
2010	Canford Cliffs	Richard Hughes	Richard Hannon Sr.	Heffer / Roy / Instance	1:37.64
2011	Roderic O'Connor	Joseph O'Brien	Aidan O'Brien	Magnier / Tabor et al.	1:37.88
2012	Power	Joseph O'Brien	Aidan O'Brien	Magnier / Tabor et al.	1:39.04
2013	Magician	Joseph O'Brien	Aidan O'Brien	Magnier / Tabor et al.	1:36.81
2014	Kingman	James Doyle	John Gosden	Khalid Abdullah	1:47.29
2015	Gleneagles	Ryan Moore	Aidan O'Brien	Magnier / Tabor et al.	1:39.30
2016	Awtaad	Chris Hayes	Kevin Prendergast	Hamdan Al Maktoum	1:45.26
2017	Churchill	Ryan Moore	Aidan O'Brien	Magnier / Tabor et al.	1:40.46
2018	Romanised	Shane Foley	Ken Condon	Robert Ng	1:38.93
2019	Phoenix of Spain	Jamie Spencer	Charles Hills	Tony Wechsler & Ann Plummer	1:36.52
2020	Siskin (Note: The 2020 race was run in June due to the COVID-19 pandemic in the Republic of Ireland)	Colin Keane	Ger Lyons	Khalid Abdullah	1:38.49
2021	Mac Swiney	Rory Cleary	Jim Bolger	Jackie Bolger	1:41.32
2022	Native Trail	William Buick	Charlie Appleby	Godolphin	1:39.28
2023	Paddington	Ryan Moore	Aidan O'Brien	Magnier / Tabor et al.	1:40.80
2024	Rosallion	Sean Levey	Richard Hannon Jr.	Obaid Al Maktoum	1:39.20
2025	Field Of Gold	Colin Keane	John & Thady Gosden	Juddmonte	1:36.58
2026	Gstaad	Ryan Moore	Aidan O'Brien	Smith / Magnier / Tabor	1:35.69

== Earlier winners ==
- 1921: Soldennis
- 1922: Spike Island
- 1923: Soldumeno
- 1924: Grand Joy
- 1925: St Donagh
- 1926: Embargo
- 1927: Fourth Hand
- 1928: Baytown
- 1929: Salisbury
- 1930: Glannarg
- 1931: Double Arch
- 1932: Lindley
- 1933: Canteener
- 1934: Cariff
- 1935: Museum
- 1936: Hocus Pocus
- 1937: Phideas
- 1938: Nearchus
- 1939: Cornfield
- 1940: Teasel
- 1941: Khosro
- 1942: Windsor Slipper
- 1943: The Phoenix
- 1944: Good Morning / Slide On (Note: The 1944 race was a dead-heat and has joint winners)
- 1945: Stalino
- 1946: Claro
- 1947: Grand Weather
- 1948: Beau Sabreur
- 1949: Solonaway
- 1950: Mighty Ocean
- 1951: Signal Box
- 1952: D C M
- 1953: Sea Charger
- 1954: Arctic Wind
- 1955: Hugh Lupus
- 1956: Lucero
- 1957: Jack Ketch
- 1958: Hard Ridden
- 1959: El Toro
- 1960: Kythnos
- 1961: Light Year
- 1962: Arctic Storm
- 1963: Linacre
- 1964: Santa Claus

== See also ==
- Horse racing in Ireland
- Irish Triple Crown race winners
- List of Irish flat horse races
