= Balmont (horse) =

American-bred Thoroughbred racehorse

- Sire: Stravinsky
- Grandsire: Nureyev
- Dam: Aldebaran Light
- Damsire: Seattle Slew
- Sex: Stallion
- Foaled: 11 March 2001
- Country: United States
- Colour: Bay
- Breeder: Sanford Robertson
- Owner: Jug Handle Ranch/Dan Byrne
- Trainer: Jeremy Noseda
- Record: 18: 4-3-3
- Earnings: £279,028

Major wins
- Gimcrack Stakes (2003); Middle Park Stakes (2003)

Balmont (foaled 11 March 2001) is an American-bred, British-trained Thoroughbred racehorse and sire. He had his greatest success as a two-year-old in 2003 when he won the Gimcrack Stakes and was awarded the win in the Middle Park Stakes on the disqualification of Three Valleys. He remained in training until the age of five but never won again although he ran well in several major sprint races, being placed in the July Cup, Golden Jubilee Stakes, Temple Stakes and Phoenix Sprint Stakes. After the end of his racing career he stood as a breeding stallion in Ireland and Australia, and now stands at the Jug Handle Ranch in Alberta Canada.

== Background ==
Balmont is a bay horse with no white markings bred in Kentucky by his owner Sanford Robertson. The colt was sent to race in Europe and was trained throughout his track career by Jeremy Noseda at Newmarket in England.

He was from the first crop of foals sired by Stravinsky who won the July Cup and the Nunthorpe Stakes in 1999, a year in which he was voted Cartier Champion Sprinter. The best of his other runners have included the Group One winning sprinters Benbaun (Prix de l'Abbaye) and Soldier's Tale,

Balmont was the first foal of Aldebaran Light who showed some racing ability, winning three races at River Downs as a three-year-old in 1999. She was descended from Queen Sucree who was the dam of Cannonade, a half-sister to both Halo and Tosmah and a close relative of Northern Dancer and L'Emigrant.

== Racing career ==
=== 2003: two-year-old season ===
As a two-year-old, Balmont was ridden in all six of his races by the veteran Irish jockey Pat Eddery. The colt made his racecourse debut in a maiden race over six furlongs at Newmarket Racecourse on 20 June. Starting at odds of 9/2 he finished second of the seven runners, beaten one and a half lengths by the favourite Byron, a colt who went on to win the Mill Reef Stakes. Three weeks later at Doncaster Racecourse he started 2/5 favourite for a six furlong maiden and recorded his first success, leading from the start and winning by three lengths from Motivus and eight others. On 25 July he contested a novice stakes (for horses with no more than one previous win) over the same distance at Newmarket. Starting at long odds-on against three opponents. Under strong restraint from Eddery, he led from the start and won by twelve lengths from Buchanan Street. In August Balmont was stepped up in class to contest the Group Two Gimcrack Stakes over six furlongs at York Racecourse. He started the 7/2 second favourite behind the Aidan O'Brien-trained Grand Reward in a nine-runner field which also included Majestic Missile (winner of the Molecomb Stakes), Byron, Cape Fear (second in the July Stakes) and Leicester Square (third in the Anglesey Stakes). Balmont led from the start, accelerated approaching the last quarter mile and held off the challenge of the Barry Hills-trained Fokine to win by a head after an "exciting battle".

The Middle Park Stakes at Newmarket on 3 October saw Balmont moved up to Group One class for the first time. Three Valleys, who had won the Coventry Stakes before finishing third in the Phoenix Stakes, started favourite ahead of Grand Reward and Kheleyf (second in the Norfolk Stakes) with Balmont the 8/1 joint fourth choice in the betting alongside Auditorium (Ripon Champion Two Years Old Trophy). The other runners included Fokine, Old Deuteronomy (second in the Phoenix Stakes), Whipper (Prix Morny) and Nevisian Lad (July Stakes). After tracking the leaders, Balmont finished strongly and finished three quarters of a length second to Three Valleys with the outsider Holborn half a length a way in third. In January 2004 Three Valleys was disqualified after the banned substance Clenbuterol was detected in a post-race urine sample. Three Valleys' trainer Roger Charlton explained that the medication had been used legitimately to treat a lung infection and had been withdrawn nine days before the Middle Park in accordance with veterinary guidelines. Traces of the drug however had remained in the colt's system and the race was awarded to Balmont.

On 18 October at Newmarket Balmont was moved up to seven furlongs for the Dewhurst Stakes and started at odds of 10/1 in field of twelve juveniles. After being restrained in the early stages he made some progress approaching the final furlong but then began to struggle and finished seventh, two and a half lengths behind the winner Milk It Mick.

=== 2004: three-year-old season ===
In 2004 Balmont was campaigned in sprint races and was ridden in his first three races by Eddie Ahearn. He suffered from splints early in the year and did not reappear until 8 July when he started a 25/1 outsider for the July Cup at Newmarket and finished third behind Frizzante and Ashdown Express. The horses finishing behind Balmont included Cape of Good Hope, Somnus, Fayr Jag, Airwave, Continent and Bahamian Pirate. Later that month he started 2/5 favourite for a minor stakes over five furlongs at Newmarket but was beaten a neck into second by the improving Bahamian Pirate. He failed to recover his best form in two subsequent races that year, finishing seventh to Bahamian Pirate in the Nunthorpe Stakes in August and fifth to Firebreak in the Challenge Stakes in October.

=== 2005: four-year-old season ===
In February 2005 a half-share in the colt was bought by the Asian investment company Hatta Bloodstock.

Balmont began his third campaign by finishing unplaced when favourite for the Abernant Stakes at Newmarket in April. In the Temple Stakes over five furlongs at Sandown Park Racecourse on 31 May he was beaten in a three-way photo-finish by the seven-year-olds Celtic Mill and Orientor. Noseda professed himself as being "delighted" with the horse's effort. On 18 June at the "Royal Ascot" meeting (run that year at York) Balmont started the 9/2 favourite in a fifteen-runner field for the Group One Golden Jubilee Stakes. Ridden by Christophe Soumillon he chased the leaders but was unable to quicken in the closing stages and finished third behind Cape of Good Hope and Galeota. In his second attempt to win the July Cup he started a 16/1 outsider and finished fifth of the nineteen runners behind Pastoral Pursuits. Balmont as then sent to Ireland and dropped to Group Two class for the Phoenix Sprint Stakes at the Curragh in which he started favourite but was beaten a short head by the six-year-old gelding Osterhase. On his last appearance of the year, Balmont made no impact in his second attempt to win the Nunthorpe Stake, finishing fifteenth of the sixteen runners behind La Cucaracha.

=== 2006: five-year-old season ===
Although Balmont remained in training as a five-year-old he failed to show any worthwhile form in two races. He finished tenth behind Reverence in the Temple Stakes and was then dropped to Listed class for the Cathedral Stakes at Salisbury Racecourse on 18 June and finished fifth of the seven runners behind Etlaala.

== Stud record ==
At the end of his racing career Balmont was retired to become a breeding stallion at the Tara Stud in County Meath, Ireland before being exported to stand at Lynward Park at Western Australia. The best of his offspring have included Balmont Mast (Mercury Stakes) and Balmont Girl (Western Australian Oaks). He was then sent to Canada where he stands at the Jug Handle Ranch in Alberta.

== Pedigree ==
Pedigree of Balmont (USA), bay stallion, 2001
Sire Stravinsky (USA) 1996	Nureyev (USA); 1977	Northern Dancer	Nearctic
Sire Stravinsky (USA) 1996	Nureyev (USA); 1977	Northern Dancer	Natalma
Sire Stravinsky (USA) 1996	Nureyev (USA); 1977	Special	Forli
Sire Stravinsky (USA) 1996	Nureyev (USA); 1977	Special	Thong
Sire Stravinsky (USA) 1996	Fire the Groom (USA); 1987	Blushing Groom	Red God
Sire Stravinsky (USA) 1996	Fire the Groom (USA); 1987	Blushing Groom	Runaway Bride
Sire Stravinsky (USA) 1996	Fire the Groom (USA); 1987	Prospector's Fire	Mr. Prospector
Sire Stravinsky (USA) 1996	Fire the Groom (USA); 1987	Prospector's Fire	Native Street
Dam Aldebaran Light (USA) 1996	Seattle Slew (USA); 1974	Bold Reasoning	Boldnesian
Dam Aldebaran Light (USA) 1996	Seattle Slew (USA); 1974	Bold Reasoning	Reason to Earn
Dam Aldebaran Light (USA) 1996	Seattle Slew (USA); 1974	My Charmer	Poker
Dam Aldebaran Light (USA) 1996	Seattle Slew (USA); 1974	My Charmer	Fair Charmer
Dam Aldebaran Light (USA) 1996	Altair (USA); 1991	Alydar	Raise a Native
Dam Aldebaran Light (USA) 1996	Altair (USA); 1991	Alydar	Sweet Tooth
Dam Aldebaran Light (USA) 1996	Altair (USA); 1991	Stellar Odyssey	Northern Dancer
Dam Aldebaran Light (USA) 1996	Altair (USA); 1991	Stellar Odyssey	Queen Sucree (Family: 2-d)
