= Soldier's Tale =

American-bred Thoroughbred racehorse

- Sire: Stravinsky
- Grandsire: Nureyev
- Dam: Myrtle
- Damsire: Batshoof
- Sex: Stallion
- Foaled: 28 March 2001
- Country: United States
- Colour: Chestnut
- Breeder: Budget Stables
- Owner: Syd Belzberg; Budget Stable
- Trainer: Jeremy Noseda
- Record: 8: 4–1–2
- Earnings: £274,224

Major wins
- Chipchase Stakes (2005); Golden Jubilee Stakes (2007)

Soldier's Tale (foaled 28 March 2001) is a retired American-bred, British-trained Thoroughbred racehorse and sire. He was a talented but injury-prone sprinter who raced only eight times before he retired at the age of six. Unraced as a two-year-old he won one minor race from two starts in early 2004 before being off the course for over a year. As a four-year-old in 2005 he won his first two races including the Chipchase Stakes before finishing fourth in the July Cup. He missed the whole of the 2006 season before returning as a six-year-old in 2007. He finished third in the Duke of York Stakes and the John of Gaunt Stakes before recording his biggest victory on his final appearance when he defeated a top-class international field to win the Golden Jubilee Stakes. After his retirement from racing he stood as a breeding stallion in Australia.

== Background ==
Soldier's Tale is a chestnut horse with a narrow white blaze bred in Kentucky by his owner Syd Belzberg's Budget Stable Inc. He was one of the best horses sired by Stravinsky who won the July Cup and the Nunthorpe Stakes in 1999, a year in which he was voted Cartier Champion Sprinter. Soldier's Tale's dam Myrtle showed above-average ability in a brief racing career, winning a maiden race and finishing third in the Princess Margaret Stakes. She was descended from the British broodmare Harlequinade, who was the ancestor of major winners including Lemon Souffle and Golden Lilac.

As a foal was offered for sale in November 2001 at Keeneland but failed to reach his $50,000 reserve price. He returned to Keeneland in September 2002 but again the bidding did not reach the reserve, which on this occasion was set at $75,000.

Soldier's Tale was sent to race in Europe and entered training with Jeremy Noseda in Newmarket, Suffolk. He was named after Igor Stravinsky's theatrical work L'Histoire du soldat.

== Racing career ==
=== 2004: three-year-old season ===
Soldier's Tale did not race as a two-year-old, beginning his racing career as a three-year-old in 2004 when he was ridden in both of his races by Eddie Ahern. On his racecourse debut he started 11/4 favourite for a six-furlong maiden race at Newmarket Racecourse on 15 April. After being restrained by Ahearn in the early stages he finished strongly but failed by a head to overhaul the Barry Hills-trained Fun To Ride with a gap of seven lengths back to Majorca in third. On 12 May the colt started 4/9 favourite against eleven opponents in a seven furlong maiden at York Racecourse. After tracking the leaders he took the lead approaching the final furlong and drew clear to win by five lengths from the filly Capestar with another nine lengths back to New Order in third. Soldier's Tale then had multiple health and injury problems, fracturing a leg and suffering a bout of colic and missed the rest of the season.

=== 2005: four-year-old season ===
A year and a day after his last run Soldier's Tale contested a six-furlong handicap race at York in which he was assigned a weight of 124 pounds and was ridden by Jamie Spencer. After being held up towards the rear of the field he made a strong run on the stands-side (the right side of the course from the jockeys' viewpoint) in the last quarter mile, catching the leader Fonthill Road in the final stride and winning by a short head. The Scotsman's correspondent described his winning run as "a tremendous burts of speed".

On 25 June Soldier's Tale was stepped up in class for the Group Three Chipchase Stakes at Newcastle Racecourse in which he was ridden by Kevin Darley and started 6/4 favourite in a twelve-runner field. The race attracted a strong field including Fayr Jag, Bahamian Pirate, Patavellian (Prix de l'Abbaye), Quito (Ayr Gold Cup), Steenberg (Wentworth Stakes), Pivotal Point (Stewards' Cup, Diadem Stakes) and Indian Maiden (Cecil Frail Stakes). After tracking the leaders Soldier's Tale took the lead inside the final furlong and won "comfortably" by half a length from Quito.

Twelve days after his win at Newcastle Soldier's Tale was moved up to the highest level to contest the Group One July Cup over six furlongs at Newmarket and started the 4/1 joint-favourite alongside Somnus in a nineteen-runner field. Ridden by Spencer, he raced up the stand-side and chased the leaders before running on in the closing stages to finish fourth behind Pastoral Pursuits, Avonbridge and Etlaala.

Injury and health problems then kept Soldier's Tale of the racecourse for almost two years. Noseda later explained that at one point in 2005 the horse was ten minutes away from being euthanised.

=== 2007: six-year-old season ===
After an absence of 22 months, the six-year-old Soldier's Tale returned in the Duke of York Stakes over six furlongs on 16 May 2007 in which he was ridden by Frankie Dettori. Despite his lack of a recent outing he was made the 5/1 third choice in the betting and stayed on strongly in the closing stages and finished third of the nineteen runners behind Amadeus Wolf and Red Clubs. On 7 June he was tried over seve furlongs for the first time since 2004 and started odds-on favourite for the Listed John of Gaunt Stakes at Haydock Park. After racing in mid-division he made a forward move approaching the last quarter mile but after moving into third he could make no further progress and was beaten by the outsiders Mine and Beckermet.

On 23 June was dropped in distance but elevated in class for the Group One Golden Jubilee Stakes over six furlongs at Royal Ascot in which he was ridden for the first time by Johnny Murtagh and started at odds of 9/1 in a twenty-one runner field. The race featured a three-horse Australian challenge comprising Miss Andretti (the 2/1 favourite), Magnus (winner of The Galaxy) and Takeover Target whilst the other runners included Amadeus Wolf, Red Clubs, Borderlescott, Quito and Fayr Jag. Takeover Target went to the front from the start and set the pace but Soldier's Tale began to make progress in the last quarter mile. He caught the Australian gelding on the line and won by a head with Asset taking third place just ahead on Red Clubs. After the race Noseda said "I love him for his heart. He has had countless fractures, had to have colic surgery and pieces of his stomach removed. He has to have a special diet and twice we have been on the verge of having to have him put down. It all sounds a bit soppy, but I love him to bits".

== Stud career ==
Soldier's Tale remained in training in 2008 and was expected to defend the Golden Jubilee Stakes but missed the race after contracting a viral infection and was exported to become a breeding stallion in Australia. He stood for Robert Sangster's Swettenham Stud in Victoria. He has sired several minor winners but no top-class performers.

== Pedigree ==
Pedigree of Soldier's Tale (USA), chestnut stallion, 2001
Sire Stravinsky (USA) 1997	Nureyev (USA); 1977	Northern Dancer	Nearctic
Sire Stravinsky (USA) 1997	Nureyev (USA); 1977	Northern Dancer	Natalma
Sire Stravinsky (USA) 1997	Nureyev (USA); 1977	Special	Forli
Sire Stravinsky (USA) 1997	Nureyev (USA); 1977	Special	Thong
Sire Stravinsky (USA) 1997	Fire the Groom (USA); 1987	Blushing Groom	Red God
Sire Stravinsky (USA) 1997	Fire the Groom (USA); 1987	Blushing Groom	Runaway Bride
Sire Stravinsky (USA) 1997	Fire the Groom (USA); 1987	Prospector's Fire	Mr. Prospector
Sire Stravinsky (USA) 1997	Fire the Groom (USA); 1987	Prospector's Fire	Native Street
Dam Myrtle (GB) 1993	Batshoof (GB); 1986	Sadler's Wells	Northern Dancer
Dam Myrtle (GB) 1993	Batshoof (GB); 1986	Sadler's Wells	Fairy Bridge
Dam Myrtle (GB) 1993	Batshoof (GB); 1986	Steel Habit	Habitat
Dam Myrtle (GB) 1993	Batshoof (GB); 1986	Steel Habit	Ampulla
Dam Myrtle (GB) 1993	Greek Goddess (GB); 1986	Young Generation	Balidar
Dam Myrtle (GB) 1993	Greek Goddess (GB); 1986	Young Generation	Brig o' Doon
Dam Myrtle (GB) 1993	Greek Goddess (GB); 1986	Cassandra	Troy
Dam Myrtle (GB) 1993	Greek Goddess (GB); 1986	Cassandra	Matinee (Family: 1-e)
