= Amadeus Wolf =

British Thoroughbred racehorse

- Sire: Mozart
- Grandsire: Danehill
- Dam: Rachelle
- Damsire: Mark of Esteem
- Sex: Stallion
- Foaled: 28 January 2003
- Died: 2017
- Country: United Kingdom
- Colour: Bay
- Breeder: Ascagnano SPA
- Owner: John Duddy; John Duddy & B McDonald
- Trainer: Kevin Ryan
- Record: 17: 4-2-3
- Earnings: £388,986

Major wins
- Gimcrack Stakes (2005); Middle Park Stakes (2005); Duke of York Stakes (2007)

Amadeus Wolf (28 January 2003 – 2017) is a British Thoroughbred racehorse and sire. He had his greatest success as a two-year-old in 2005 when he won three of his five races including the Gimcrack Stakes and the Middle Park Stakes. He failed to win in the following year but ran well in several major sprint races, finishing second in the Nunthorpe Stakes and third in both the Prix Maurice de Gheest and the Haydock Sprint Cup. He recorded his last important success when taking the Duke of York Stakes in 2007 and was retired at the end of the year. He has since stood as a breeding stallion in Ireland and France.

== Background ==
Amadeus Wolf is a bay horse with a small white star bred in the United Kingdom by the Italian breeding company Ascagnano SPA. As a yearling in September 2004 Amadeus Wolf was offered for sale in Italy and bought for 87,000 euros by Anthony Stroud He was returned to the sales ring at Tattersalls in April 2005 but failed to make his 50,000 guinea reserve price. The colt then entered the ownership of John Duddy and was sent into training with Kevin Ryan in North Yorkshire. He was ridden in all of his races by Neil Callan.

Amadeus Wolf was from the first and only crop of foals sired by Mozart who was the 2001 Cartier Champion Sprinter but died in May 2002 at the age of four. His other foals included Dandy Man (Palace House Stakes) and Rebellion (Commonwealth Stakes). His dam, Rachelle was an unraced daughter of Mark of Esteem. She was descended from Square Generation who was the female-line ancestor of Awesome Again.

== Racing career ==
=== 2005: two-year-old season ===
On his racecourse debut, Amadeus Wolf contested a maiden race over six furlongs at Ayr Racecourse on 26 May. Starting the 5/4 favourite he started slowly but quickly took the lead and stayed on strongly in the closing stages and won by two and a half lengths from Glasshoughton. His victory gave his sire Mozart his first win as a breeding stallion. The colt was immediately stepped up sharply in class to contest the Group Two Coventry Stakes over the same distance on 14 June. Starting the 9/1 fifth choice in the betting he stayed on in the closing stages without being able to quicken and finished third behind Red Clubs and Pacific Pride. He was then dropped in distance and started 4/6 favourite for a minor race over five furlongs at Chester Racecourse but after going to the front approaching the final furlong he was overtaken and beaten a neck by the Tim Easterby-trained Mullaad.

On 17 August at York Racecourse Amadeus Wolf returned to six furlongs for the Group Two Gimcrack Stakes and started the 7/1 third choice behind the joint-favourites Red Clubs and Pacific Pride. The other ten runners included Titus Alone (Windsor Castle Stakes) and Mullaad. He tracked the leaders as Mutawajid set the pace, before making a forward move in the last quarter mile. He overtook Red Clubs 75 yards from the finish and won by one and a half lengths. Kevin Ryan commented "Amadeus Wolf was better today than at the Royal meeting. He has been going well at home and today he confirmed what we have thought of him".

Amadeus Wolf and Red Clubs met for the third time when they were among six colts to contest the Group One Middle Park Stakes over six furlongs at Newmarket Racecourse on 30 September. The Irish colt Ivan Denisovich started favourite after winning the July Stakes with Amadeus Wolf next in the betting on 4/1 alongside the Sirenia Stakes winner Prince of Light. The other two runners were Always Hopeful (Richmond Stakes) and the 20/1 outsider Johnny Alpha. After tracking the early leader Always Hopeful, Amadeus Wolf took the lead approaching the final furlong and stayed on to win by one and a quarter lengths from Red Clubs. After the race Ryan said "We've always thought a lot of this horse. We had a slight doubt about the ground, but he's handled it. He's super, he gave 110 per cent. He travelled good and picked up well. You have to give the 2,000 Guineas a go now. He won't run again this year and it will make the winter a bit shorter".

=== 2006: three-year-old season ===
On his three-year-old debut, Amadeus Wolf contested the classic 2000 Guineas over the Rowley Mile at Newmarket and started the 9/1 fourth favourite behind George Washington, Sir Percy and Horatio Nelson. He was in contention early on faded in the last quarter mile and finished seventh of the fourteen runners behind George Washington. He then reverted to spring distances and finished fifth to Les Arcs i the Golden Jubilee Stakes before running fourth to the same horse in the July Cup after briefly taking the lead in the closing stages. In August he was sent to France and finished third to Marchand d'Or in the Prix Maurice de Gheest and then returned to England for the Nunthorpe Stakes at York. He produced probably his best effort of the season as he finished second to Reverence with Red Clubs, The Tatling and Fayr Jag among the beaten horses. In September he finished third to Reverence when second favourite for the Haydock Sprint Cup. On his final rur of the year he came home fifth behind Desert Lord in the Prix de l'Abbaye at Longchamp Racecourse in October.

=== 2007: four-year-old season ===
Amadeus Wolf began his third season in the Duke of York Stakes over six furlongs at York and was made the 4/1 favourite in a seventeen-runner field which included Les Arcs, Red Clubs and Fayr Jag as well as Soldier's Tale. He was among the leaders from the start, took the lead inside the final furlong and recorded his first win for more than nineteen months as he won by one and a quarter lengths from his old rival Red Clubs. Despite his promising seasonal debut, Amadeus Wolf failed to win or place in his other four starts. He ran eleventh behind Soldier's Tale in the Golden Jubilee, twelfth to Sakhee's Secret in the July Cup and seventh to Kingsgate Native in the Nunthorpe. On his final racecourse appearance, he finished twelfth of the fourteen runners behind Red Clubs in the Haydock Sprint Cup.

In total, Amadeus Wolf and Red Clubs met thirteen times over three seasons, with Amadeus Wolf leading their head-to-head count 7–6.

== Stud career ==
Amadeus Wolf was retired from racing to become a breeding stallion at the Irish National Stud. As of 2017 he was based at the Haras des Faunes in France. The best of his offspring have included Hamza (Abernant Stakes), Mister Sea Wolf (Doncaster Prelude) and Forest Edge.

He died after suffering a stroke in 2017.

== Pedigree ==
Pedigree of Amadeus Wolf (GB), bay stallion, 2003
Sire Mozart (USA) 1998	Danehill (USA); 1986	Danzig	Nearctic
Sire Mozart (USA) 1998	Danehill (USA); 1986	Danzig	Natalma
Sire Mozart (USA) 1998	Danehill (USA); 1986	Razyana	Forli
Sire Mozart (USA) 1998	Danehill (USA); 1986	Razyana	Thong
Sire Mozart (USA) 1998	Victoria Cross (USA); 1983	Spectacular Bid	Red God
Sire Mozart (USA) 1998	Victoria Cross (USA); 1983	Spectacular Bid	Runaway Bride
Sire Mozart (USA) 1998	Victoria Cross (USA); 1983	Glowing Tribute	Mr. Prospector
Sire Mozart (USA) 1998	Victoria Cross (USA); 1983	Glowing Tribute	Native Street
Dam Rachelle (IRE) 1998	Mark of Esteem (IRE); 1993	Darshaan	Shirley Heights
Dam Rachelle (IRE) 1998	Mark of Esteem (IRE); 1993	Darshaan	Delsy
Dam Rachelle (IRE) 1998	Mark of Esteem (IRE); 1993	Homage	Ajdal
Dam Rachelle (IRE) 1998	Mark of Esteem (IRE); 1993	Homage	Home Love
Dam Rachelle (IRE) 1998	Rose Violet (USA); 1990	Alleged	Hoist The Flag
Dam Rachelle (IRE) 1998	Rose Violet (USA); 1990	Alleged	Princess Pout
Dam Rachelle (IRE) 1998	Rose Violet (USA); 1990	Shawnee Creek	Mr. Prospector
Dam Rachelle (IRE) 1998	Rose Violet (USA); 1990	Shawnee Creek	Back Ack (Family: 1-c)
