= Red Clubs =

Irish-bred Thoroughbred racehorse

- Sire: Red Ransom
- Grandsire: Roberto
- Dam: Two Clubs
- Damsire: First Trump
- Sex: Stallion
- Foaled: 17 January 2003
- Country: Ireland
- Colour: Brown
- Breeder: John Fike
- Owner: Ronald J Arculli
- Trainer: Barry Hills
- Record: 25: 6-4-2
- Earnings: £ 526,087

Major wins
- Coventry Stakes (2005); Greenham Stakes (2006); Diadem Stakes (2006); Haydock Sprint Cup (2007)

Awards
- European Champion Sprinter (2007)

Red Clubs (17 January 2003 – 17 February 2010) was an Irish-bred Thoroughbred racehorse and sire. He won the Group Two Coventry Stakes as a two-year-old, two Group Three races at three and the Group One Haydock Sprint Cup at four. The last named win was largely responsible for Red Clubs being named European Champion Sprinter at the 2007 Cartier Racing Awards. He was noted for the toughness and consistency he displayed in a twenty-five race career which lasted from 2005 to 2007.

== Background ==
Red Clubs, a brown horse with a white star and snip, was bred in Ireland by Dr John Fike at the Islanmore Stud in Croom, County Limerick, having been conceived at the Vinery Stud in Kentucky. His sire, Red Ransom, was a lightly raced son of Roberto who became a successful stallion. Among his best progeny were Electrocutionist, Typhoon Tracy and Intikhab. Red Clubs’ dam Two Clubs, a half sister of the Haydock Sprint Cup winner Petong, was a successful sprinter, winning five races including two at Listed level.

In November 2004, Red Clubs was sent by the Islanmore Stud as a weanling to the Tattersalls sales, where he was sold for 40,000gns. A year later he was returned to Tattersalls and was again sold for 40,000gns, this time being bought by BBA Ireland and Barry Hills. Red Clubs entered training at Hills' stable at Lambourn, Berkshire. He was ridden in twenty-one of his twenty-five races by his trainer's son Michael Hills.

== Racing career ==
=== 2005: two-year-old season ===
Red Clubs racing career began unremarkably in April 2005, when he finished sixth of the eight runners in a five-furlong maiden race at Newmarket. Later in the same month he recorded his first win in a maiden at Goodwood producing a strong late run to lead inside the final furlong and win by half a length. In May he returned to Newmarket and was sent off 11/4 second favourite in a minor race. Despite carrying top weight of 131lbs and being hampered two furlongs out he proved far too good for his opponents, pulling clear in the closing stages to win by four lengths.

Ascot Racecourse was closed for redevelopment work for most of 2007, and the Royal Meeting was transferred to York. Red Clubs was aimed at the Group Two Coventry Stakes on the opening day and was sent off at odds of 11/2. Michael Hills had the colt in a prominent position throughout before moving into the lead a furlong out. Red Clubs ran on well in the closing stages to win his third successive race by one and three-quarter lengths from Pacific Pride. After the race Barry Hills said that he had been "very Impressed" by the colt and commended his placid temperament by saying that "you could put him at the bottom of your bed if you wanted." Following his York win Red Clubs was made 2/1 favourite for the July Stakes at Newmarket, but failed to reproduce his form, finishing seventh of the sixteen runners.

In the second half of the season, Red Clubs produced a series of respectable placed efforts but was unable to win again. He was no match for George Washington in the Phoenix Stakes at the Curragh and was beaten more than ten lengths in finishing third. He then finished second to Amadeus Wolf in both the Group Two Mill Reef Stakes at Newbury and the Group One Middle Park Stakes at Newmarket. On his final start of the year he finished fourth to Sir Percy and Horatio Nelson in the Dewhurst Stakes.

The strength of the opposition Red Clubs faced in these races was emphasised in the International Classification. He was rated the fifth best colt of the year, with the top four places being filled by George Washington, Sir Percy, Amadeus Wolf and Horatio Nelson. Commenting on his season, the Racing Post described him as an "ultra-tough and precocious" colt.

=== 2006: three-year-old season ===
Red Clubs was aimed at the one mile 2000 Guineas in the spring of 2006, beginning his campaign with a run the Group Three Greenham Stakes, a recognised trial race at Newbury. He raced prominently, and went clear inside the final furlong, before being eased down to record an "impressive" victory by one and three quarter lengths from Marcus Andronicus. The lack of early pace however, resulted in a slow time and did not convince everyone that Red Clubs had the stamina for the Classic. In the Guineas itself, he made little impression and weakened in the closing stages to finish twelfth behind George Washington. He was dropped in class and distance for the Group Three Jersey Stakes over seven furlongs at Royal Ascot but could finish only sixth behind Jeremy.

From this point on, Red Clubs was campaigned almost exclusively over sprint distances. The change was not immediately successful, as he finished unplaced in the July Cup. He showed rather better form to finish second to Moss Vale in a strong Group Three race at the Curragh, but was then unplaced behind Reverence in the Nunthorpe Stakes and the Haydock Sprint Cup.

In late September, Red Clubs ran in the Group Two Diadem Stakes at the newly reopened Ascot Racecourse. It was well-contested race with the runners including the Group One winners Somnus and Fayr Jag and Red Clubs started 6/1. He raced prominently before showing a "smart turn of foot" to take the lead in the final furlong and going clear. Although he swerved "violently" to the left in the closing stages, he was able to win by one and a quarter lengths from Baltic King. There was some speculation that Red Clubs had been "spooked" by a shadow on the course in an echo of Dayjur's defeat in the Breeders' Cup Sprint. A week later, Red Clubs was sent to France for the Prix de l'Abbaye at Longchamp but finished unplaced behind Desert Lord.

=== 2007: four-year-old season ===
Red Clubs won only once from seven starts in his championship season, but his consistent efforts in important races earned him enough points to take the title. He began in the Duke of York Stakes in May, in which he led approaching the final furlong before finishing second to his old rival Amadeus Wolf. He was well fancied for the Temple Stakes at Sandown two weeks later, but broke badly and was never able to get into contention.

At Royal Ascot he contested the lead in the final stages of the Golden Jubilee Stakes before finishing fourth, beaten just over a length by Soldier's Tale, Takeover Target and Asset. He then improved on his 2006 effort in the July Cup, finishing third to Sakhee's Secret. In the same month it was announced that Red Clubs would retire to the Tally-Ho Stud at the end of the season.

Another solid effort followed, as he ran fourth to the two-year-old Kingsgate Native in the Nunthorpe Stakes, before being sent to Haydock for the Sprint Cup. His rivals included Sakhee's Secret, Somnus, Asset, Amadeus Wolf and the French-trained Marchand d'Or in what was described as an "outstanding renewal" of the race. Michael Hills settled the colt in the early stages before moving up to challenge in the last quarter of a mile. He caught and passed Marchand d'Or inside the final furlong and ran on strongly to record his biggest win by three quarters of a length. Barry Hills called him "a very, very game horse and has run consistently well all through his career." Michael Hills said that Red Clubs "has given me everything from two to three to four... I'm so pleased for the horse that he has won a Group One."

On his final start he was moved back up to seven furlongs for the Prix de la Forêt at Longchamp, but tired badly on the soft ground and finished last of the thirteen runners.

== Assessment ==
As noted above, Red Clubs was rated the fifth best colt of his generation in 2005, with his mark of 117 putting him seven pounds below the champion George Washington.

At the 2007 Cartier Racing Awards Red Clubs was named European Champion Sprinter in a "closely-fought" contest. In the World Thoroughbred Racehorse Rankings however, he was rated only the fifth best European Sprinter of the year, his rating of 117 placing him three pounds below the top rated Sakhee's Secret.

== Stud career ==
Red Clubs stood at the Tally-Ho Stud near Mullingar, County Westmeath from 2008 to 2010. His first foals reached the racecourse as two-year-old in 2011. His first crop won 34 races and included Vedelago, winner of the Group Three Premio Primi Passi. Red Clubs, second crop of foals included the Queen Mary Stakes winner Ceiling Kitty. In September 2012 the grey filly Sky Lantern became Red Clubs' first Group One winner when she won the Moyglare Stud Stakes. On 5 May 2013, Sky Lantern won the 1000 Guineas at Newmarket.

He died on 17 February 2010 after being injured in an accident when covering a mare. The Racing Post commented that "the premature death of Red Clubs has robbed the industry of a highly promising young stallion."

== Pedigree ==
Pedigree of Red Clubs (IRE), brown stallion, 2003
Sire Red Ransom (USA) 1987	Roberto; 1969	Hail To Reason	Turn-To
Sire Red Ransom (USA) 1987	Roberto; 1969	Hail To Reason	Nothirdchance
Sire Red Ransom (USA) 1987	Roberto; 1969	Bramalea	Nashua (horse)
Sire Red Ransom (USA) 1987	Roberto; 1969	Bramalea	Rarelea
Sire Red Ransom (USA) 1987	Arabia; 1977	Damascus	Sword Dancer
Sire Red Ransom (USA) 1987	Arabia; 1977	Damascus	Kerala
Sire Red Ransom (USA) 1987	Arabia; 1977	Christmas Wind	Nearctic
Sire Red Ransom (USA) 1987	Arabia; 1977	Christmas Wind	Bally Free
Dam Two Clubs (IRE) 1996	First Trump; 1991	Primo Dominie	Dominion
Dam Two Clubs (IRE) 1996	First Trump; 1991	Primo Dominie	Swann Ann
Dam Two Clubs (IRE) 1996	First Trump; 1991	Valika	Valiyar
Dam Two Clubs (IRE) 1996	First Trump; 1991	Valika	Double Finesse
Dam Two Clubs (IRE) 1996	Miss Cindy; 1975	Mansingh	Jaipur
Dam Two Clubs (IRE) 1996	Miss Cindy; 1975	Mansingh	Tutasi
Dam Two Clubs (IRE) 1996	Miss Cindy; 1975	Iridium	Linacre
Dam Two Clubs (IRE) 1996	Miss Cindy; 1975	Iridium	Tula Melody (Family: 8-a)
