= Les Arcs (horse) =

American-bred Thoroughbred racehorse

- Sire: Arch
- Grandsire: Kris S.
- Dam: La Sarto
- Damsire: Cormorant
- Sex: Gelding
- Foaled: 24 April 2000
- Country: United States
- Colour: Bay or Brown
- Breeder: Elk Manor Farm
- Owner: Sheikh Mohammed; Willie McKay
- Trainer: John Gosden; Richard Guest; Tim Pitt; Stewart Parr; J S Moore
- Record: 42: 12–7–3
- Earnings: £527,591

Major wins
- Cammidge Trophy (2006); Golden Jubilee Stakes (2006); July Cup (2006)

Awards
- Top-rated European-trained sprinter (2006); Maryland-bred Horse of the Year (2006)

Les Arcs (24 April 2000 - 8 November 2022) was a Thoroughbred racehorse who was bred in the United States and trained in the United Kingdom. After racing with mixed results over a variety of distances (and an attempt at hurdling), the gelding emerged as a top-class performer when switched to sprint distances. In 2006 he won six races including the Golden Jubilee Stakes and the July Cup, both Group One races and was the highest-rated European sprinter of the year. He was also named Horse of the Year by the Maryland Horse Breeders Association. In all, Les Arcs won twelve races and was placed ten times from forty-two starts between May 2003 and August 2010.

== Background ==
Les Arcs is a dark bay or brown gelding with no white markings bred by John Moran's Elk Manor Farm at North East, in Cecil County, Maryland. He was from the first crop of foals sired by Arch, a Kentucky-bred stallion who won the Super Derby in 1998. Arch's other major winners include Blame, Archarcharch (Arkansas Derby), Arravale (E. P. Taylor Stakes), Love Theway Youare (Vanity Handicap) and Pine Island (Alabama Stakes). Les Arcs dam, La Sarto was a granddaughter of Anne Campbell, a mare whose other descendants included Fasliyev and Misty for Me.

In September 2001, the yearling colt was sent to the Keeneland sales, where he was bought for $140,000 by the bloodstock agent John Ferguson, acting on behalf of Sheikh Mohammed. He was then exported to England to be trained by John Gosden at Newmarket, Suffolk.

== Racing career ==
=== 2003–2005: early career ===
Les Arcs was unraced as a two-year-old and had only three races as a three-year-old in 2003. He won one of these races, a ten furlong maiden race at Ripon Racecourse in June. In October 2003 Les Arcs (then still an entire colt) was sent to the Tattersalls sales at Newmarket and was bought by the trainer Richard Guest for 32,000 guineas on behalf of the football agent Willie McKay.

In 2004 Les Arcs was gelded and campaigned in minor handicap races, running thirteen times. His two victories came at Hamilton Park over a mile in June and at Wolverhampton Racecourse over nine furlongs in December, and earned his owners a combined total of less than £7,165. In August Guest, a former National Hunt jockey, tried Les Arcs in a two and a quarter mile hurdle race at Cartmel Racecourse, but the experiment proved to be a failure, as the gelding finished last of the eight finishers. He ended the season with an official rating of 74, approximately forty pounds below top class.

In the following year, the gelding ran thirteen times and made steady progress, winning handicaps over seven furlongs at Musselburgh in May and Chester in June as well as finishing second on four occasions. In autumn he left Guest's yard and moved to the stable of Tim Pitt, who had been working as an assistant to the National Hunt trainer Colin Tinkler when he responded to a job advertisement in the Racing Post to train for Willie McKay, and was successful ahead of 44 other applicants. On his first start for his new stable in December Les Arcs recorded his most valuable win up to that time when he on a £12,000 handicap over six furlong on the polytrack surface at Lingfield. His success also made him the first winner sent out by Pitt from his stable at Bawtry. Les Arcs ended the season with a rating of 96.

=== 2006: six-year-old season ===
Les Arcs continued his progress on the polytrack in the early part of 2006: he won over six furlongs at Wolverhampton Racecourse in January before moving down to the minimum distance of five furlongs for the first time to win at Lingfield in February and March. On 25 March Les Arcs returned to the turf and was moved up in class to contest the Listed Cammidge Trophy over six furlongs at Redcar Racecourse. Ridden by Neil Callan, he took the lead approaching the final furlong and recorded his fifth consecutive win, beating Quito by half a length, with Reverence in third and Continent unplaced. His winning run came to an end in his next race, but he improved his rating as he finished second of seventeen runners in the Listed Abernant Stakes at Newmarket Racecourse, beaten a short head by the mare Paradise Isle, to whom he was conceding nine pounds. Les Arcs contested his first Group race at the age of six at Sandown Park Racecourse on 30 May when he finished unplaced behind Reverence on soft ground in the Temple Stakes.

Despite his disappointing run at Sandown, Les Arcs was sent to Royal Ascot, where he was entered in both the King's Stand Stakes over five furlongs and the Golden Jubilee Stakes over six, being ridden in both races by John Egan. On the opening day of the meeting he started at odds of 33/1 for the King's Stand, and finished eleventh of the twenty-eight runners behind the Australian gelding Takeover Target. Les Arcs also started at 33/1 for the Golden Jubilee Stakes four days later, with Takeover Target being made the 7/2 favourite in a field of eighteen. Egan settled the gelding in midfield before making progress in the final quarter mile. He overtook Takeover Target approaching the final furlong and held the late challenge of the three-year-old Balthazar's Gift to win the Group One prize by a neck. After the race Egan said "I heard on the commentary there was one (Balthazaar's Gift) coming up and I panicked slightly that he was going to come and do me. He's a fantastic horse and was useful over a mile and a quarter. We used to think he was a bit quirky because he never got there but five, six and even seven furlongs seem to suit him a lot better." Pitt praised the winner saying: "This guy put us on the map with a good winter. John gave him a great ride but it was the longest furlong in my life. This guy has got a lot of natural speed but when he kept going up and up the handicap there's only so many places he can be entered up."

Three weeks after his success at Royal Ascot, Les Arcs met Takeover Target for the third time in the July Cup over six furlongs at Newmarket. Starting at odds of 10/1 Les Arc was positioned behind the front-runners before moving past the Middle Park Stakes winner Amadeus Wolf to take the lead inside the final furlong. In the closing stages he repelled the late runs of Iffraaj and Ashdown Express to win by a head and three quarters of a length. Pitt professed himself delighted with the result "as it proves Ascot wasn't a fluke", whilst McKay admitted to having wagered heavily on his horse, saying that "I couldn't think why he was 14s, 12s and 10s for this race, so we filled our boots".

Les Arcs did not reappear until October, when he was sent to Japan to contest the Sprinters Stakes at Nakayama Racecourse. He finished seventh of the sixteen runners, four lengths behind the winner Takeover Target. In this race he was ridden by the French jockey Eric Saint-Martin, after John Egan was refused a license to ride in Japan: the problem arose from an incident in Hong Kong in 2002, when Egan was arrested, but never charged, during an investigation into alleged corruption.

=== 2007–2010: later career ===
Les Arcs remained in training, but never recovered his form of 2007. His career was affected by training problems and he raced only three times in the next four seasons. In May 2007 he started at odds of 14/1 for the Duke of York Stakes and finished thirteenth of the seventeen runners behind Amadeus Wolf at a time when many of Pitt's horses were suffering from ill health. The gelding sustained a tendon injury in the race and did not race again that year. In the following season Stewart Parr took over from Pitt at Bawtry, but Les Arcs made only one appearance, finishing last in a race at Haydock Park in July. More than two years later he ran for the final time when he finished last of the eight runners in a race at Nottingham Racecourse.

Les Arscs died on 8 November 2022 aged 22 years.

== Assessment and honours ==
At the Cartier Racing Awards in November 2006, Les Arcs was beaten by Reverence in the vote for European Champion Sprinter. In the 2006 World Thoroughbred Racehorse Rankings he was rated on 118, making him the best European-trained sprinter of that year, one pound ahead of Reverence.

In March 2007, the Maryland Horse Breeders Association voted Les Arcs their Horse of the Year award for horses bred in the state, as well as the awards for best sprinter, best older male and best turf horse. He was the first horse trained outside North America to win award since El Gran Senor.

== Pedigree ==
Pedigree of Les Arcs (USA), dark bay or brown gelding, 2000
Sire Arch (USA) 1995	Kris S. (USA); 1977	Roberto	Hail to Reason
Sire Arch (USA) 1995	Kris S. (USA); 1977	Roberto	Bramalea
Sire Arch (USA) 1995	Kris S. (USA); 1977	Sharp Queen	Princequillo
Sire Arch (USA) 1995	Kris S. (USA); 1977	Sharp Queen	Bridgework
Sire Arch (USA) 1995	Aurora (USA); 1988	Danzig	Northern Dancer
Sire Arch (USA) 1995	Aurora (USA); 1988	Danzig	Pas de Nom
Sire Arch (USA) 1995	Aurora (USA); 1988	Althea	Alydar
Sire Arch (USA) 1995	Aurora (USA); 1988	Althea	Courtly Dee
Dam La Sarto (USA) 1990	Cormorant (USA); 1974	His Majesty	Ribot
Dam La Sarto (USA) 1990	Cormorant (USA); 1974	His Majesty	Flower Bowl
Dam La Sarto (USA) 1990	Cormorant (USA); 1974	Song Sparrow	Tudor Minstrel
Dam La Sarto (USA) 1990	Cormorant (USA); 1974	Song Sparrow	Swoons Tune
Dam La Sarto (USA) 1990	Dame Sybil (USA); 1978	Elocutionist	Gallant Romeo
Dam La Sarto (USA) 1990	Dame Sybil (USA); 1978	Elocutionist	Strictly Speaking
Dam La Sarto (USA) 1990	Dame Sybil (USA); 1978	Anne Campbell	Never Bend
Dam La Sarto (USA) 1990	Dame Sybil (USA); 1978	Anne Campbell	Repercussion (Family: 16-h)
