= Mozart (horse) =

Irish-bred Thoroughbred racehorse

- Racing colours of Michael Tabor
- Sire: Danehill
- Grandsire: Danzig
- Dam: Victoria Cross
- Damsire: Spectacular Bid
- Sex: Stallion
- Foaled: 13 February 1998
- Country: Ireland
- Colour: Bay
- Breeder: Newgate Stud
- Owner: Sue Magnier & Michael Tabor
- Trainer: Aidan O'Brien
- Record: 10: 5-1-2
- Earnings: £ 571,174

Major wins
- Jersey Stakes (2001); July Cup (2001); Nunthorpe Stakes (2001)

Awards
- European Champion Sprinter (2001)

Mozart was an Irish champion Thoroughbred racehorse and sire. He was named European Champion Sprinter as a three-year-old in 2001, when his victories included two Group One races in England, the July Cup and the Nunthorpe Stakes. He was retired to stud but died as a four-year-old in May 2002 after siring one crop of foals.

== Background ==
Mozart was bred in Ireland by Fahd Salman's Newgate Stud. His sire Danehill was one of the most successful stallions of his era, producing the winners of more than a thousand races including one hundred and fiftty-six at Group One/Grade I level. Among the best of his offspring have been Dylan Thomas, Rock of Gibraltar George Washington, Duke of Marmalade and North Light. Mozart's dam, Victoria Cross was an unraced daughter of the highly successful broodmare Glowing Tribute, making her a half sister of the Kentucky Derby winner Sea Hero.

Mozart was sent as a yearling to the Tattersalls Houghton Sale in September 1999 where he was bought for 340,000gns by the bloodstock agent Dermot "Demi" O’Byrne on behalf of John Magnier and the Coolmore organisation. Mozart was sent into training with Aidan O'Brien at Ballydoyle and was ridden in eight of his ten races by Michael Kinane.

== Racing career ==
=== 2000: two-year-old season ===
Mozart made his first appearance at the Curragh in July, when he started at odds of 2/9 for a seven furlong maiden race. Ridden by Seamus Heffernan he moved into the lead at half way and soon went clear, winning easily by eight lengths from Speirbhean, a filly who went on to win a Group Three race and became the dam of Teofilo. Mozart was then sent to England for Europe's most valuable two-year-old contest, the £400,000 Tattersalls Houghton Sales Stakes at Newmarket, a race restricted to two-year-olds sold at the previous year's Houghton sale. Mozart started the 11/10 favourite in a field of twenty-six and justified his position by taking the lead inside the final furlong and winning by a length from the previously unbeaten Norwegian-trained filly Pretty Girl. After the race his joint-owner Sue Magnier called him "a very smart horse" who would "definitely stay a mile" and the bookmakers offered him at odds of 20/1 for the following year's 2000 Guineas.

On his third and final start of the year Mozart returned to Newmarket for the Group One Dewhurst Stakes, for which he started 11/4 second favourite. The colt failed to settle and raced prominently to dispute the lead two furlongs out but weakened in the closing stages to finish fourth of the ten runners, beaten just under two lengths behind Tobougg.

=== 2001: three-year-old season ===
Mozart disappointed on his first start of 2001, when he started 1/4 favourite for the 2000 Guineas Trial at Leopardstown in April, but finished third after leading in the early stages. Mozart was reported to be working "exceptionally well" at home but a second successive odds-on defeat followed three weeks later. In the Group Three Tetrarch Stakes at the Curragh, he started at 2/5 and finished third to his stablemate Modigliani in a three way photo-finish. Mozart's reputation had fallen by the time of the running of the Irish 2,000 Guineas at the end of May and he started at odds of 20/1. The fact that Kinane chose to ride his stable companion Minardi suggested that Mozart was not expected to win and could be being used as a pacemaker. He was sent into the lead by Seamus Heffernan and opened up a clear lead before being caught inside the final furlong and beaten by another Ballydoyle colt, Black Minnaloushe, with Minardi third.

At Royal Ascot in June Mozart recorded his first Group race win in the Jersey Stakes. Kinane sent him into the lead from the start and he ran on strongly in the closing stages to hold off the sustained challenge of Aldebaran by a neck. After the race O'Brien praised the colt and said that "the plan has always been to go back to sprinting."

From this point on Mozart was campaigned over sprint distances and had his two most important successes, beginning with the July Cup at Newmarket. Before the race he narrowly missed being kicked in the head by another runner in the paddock and then almost ran away with Kinane when being ridden down to the start. Once the race began however, he was never in any danger as he led from the start before going clear inside the final furlong to win by three and a half lengths from the mare Cassandra Go The Racing Post called him a "flying machine" and compared his performance favourably with that of Stravinsky in 1999. The Telegraph described it as "one of the finest sprinting performances in the modern era" and reported that the colt was being "hailed as the new Dayjur."

A month later he moved down to the minimum distance of five furlongs (1000m) for the first time for the Nunthorpe Stakes at York. Mozart stumbled as the stalls opened causing his saddle to slip back over his hindquarters and making it impossible for Kinane to ride a normal race. Despite this handicap, Mozart was prominent throughout the race and moved into the lead two furlongs out. He ran on strongly in the closing stages to beat the reigning Champion Sprinter Nuclear Debate by two lengths. O'Brien called it an "amazing performance" and praised Kinane, saying that the slipped saddle must have made the experience "like riding a camel."

Mozart was off the course for more than two months, bypassing the usual sprinters' targets such as the Haydock Sprint Cup, before being sent to the United States for the Breeders' Cup Sprint at Belmont Park for which he was reportedly well-fancied. Racing on dirt for the first time, Mozart started slowly and was never in contention, finishing eleventh of the fourteen runners behind Squirtle Squirt.

== Assessment ==
As a two-year-old, Mozart was given a rating of 115 by the International Classification, making him the fourteenth best colt of his generation, eight pounds behind his stable companion Minardi. In 2001 his rating of 125 was the second highest for a European three-year-old colt and the highest for any European sprinter by a margin of six pounds.

In the 2001 Cartier Racing Awards he was named European Champion Sprinter.

== Stud career ==
Mozart was retired to stand as a stallion at his owners’ Coolmore Stud. On 11 May 2002 the colt fell ill, and "acute non-responsive colitis" was diagnosed. He received intensive veterinary treatment but his condition worsened and he died the following morning. His only crop of foals produced more than fifty runners who won over a hundred races. His most notable progeny were Amadeus Wolf, Dandy Man (Palace House Stakes) and Rebellion (Commonwealth Stakes, Stratham Stakes winner in USA and sire in Argentina). His stud fee at the time of his death was IR£30,000.

== Pedigree ==
Pedigree of Mozart (IRE), bay stallion, 1998
Sire Danehill (USA) 1986	Danzig; 1977	Northern Dancer	Nearctic
Sire Danehill (USA) 1986	Danzig; 1977	Northern Dancer	Natalma*
Sire Danehill (USA) 1986	Danzig; 1977	Pas de Nom	Admiral's Voyage
Sire Danehill (USA) 1986	Danzig; 1977	Pas de Nom	Petitioner
Sire Danehill (USA) 1986	Rayzana; 1981	His Majesty	Ribot*
Sire Danehill (USA) 1986	Rayzana; 1981	His Majesty	Flower Bowl*
Sire Danehill (USA) 1986	Rayzana; 1981	Spring Adieu	Buckpasser
Sire Danehill (USA) 1986	Rayzana; 1981	Spring Adieu	Natalma*
Dam Victoria Cross (USA) 1983	Spectacular Bid; 1976	Bold Bidder	Bold Ruler
Dam Victoria Cross (USA) 1983	Spectacular Bid; 1976	Bold Bidder	High Bid
Dam Victoria Cross (USA) 1983	Spectacular Bid; 1976	Spectacular	Promised Land
Dam Victoria Cross (USA) 1983	Spectacular Bid; 1976	Spectacular	Stop On Red
Dam Victoria Cross (USA) 1983	Glowing Tribute; 1973	Graustark	Ribot*
Dam Victoria Cross (USA) 1983	Glowing Tribute; 1973	Graustark	Flower Bowl*
Dam Victoria Cross (USA) 1983	Glowing Tribute; 1973	Admiring	Hail To Reason
Dam Victoria Cross (USA) 1983	Glowing Tribute; 1973	Admiring	Searching (Family: 1-x)

- Mozart's pedigree contains a large amount of inbreeding. He is inbred 4 × 4 to the stallion Ribot and to the mares Natalma and Flower Bowl. This means that each of these horses appears twice in the fourth generation of his pedigree.
