= Bahamian Pirate =

American-bred Thoroughbred racehorse

- Sire: Housebuster
- Grandsire: Mt. Livermore
- Dam: Shining Through
- Damsire: Deputy Minister
- Sex: Gelding
- Foaled: 3 March 1995
- Country: United States
- Colour: Chestnut
- Breeder: Trackside Farm & Liberation Farm & G A Seelbinder
- Owner: Lucayan Stud; Lhendup Dorji; David Nicholls Racing Club
- Trainer: Con Collins; David Nicholls
- Record: 104: 12-15-10
- Earnings: £478,337

Major wins
- Ayr Gold Cup (2000); Bentinck Stakes (2000); Phoenix Sprint Stakes (2001); Nunthorpe Stakes (2004)

Bahamian Pirate (3 March 1995 – February 2017) was a British Thoroughbred racehorse. He was a specialist sprinter who produced his best form on soft ground and was trained for most of his racing career by David "Dandy" Nicholls in Yorkshire. He was unraced as a juvenile and did not win a race until he was four years old. As a five-year-old he recorded his first major win when he took the Ayr Gold Cup and went on to win the Listed Bentinck Stakes later that year. We won the Phoenix Sprint Stakes in 2001 but then went three years with only limited success. He returned to form as a nine-year-old and recorded his first Group One success on his sixty-eighth appearance in the Nunthorpe Stakes at York Racecourse in August 2004. He remained in training until the age of twelve before retiring with a record of 12 wins and 25 places from 104 starts.

== Background ==
Bahamian Pirate was a chestnut gelding with a broad white blaze and a white sock on his right hind leg bred in Kentucky by Trackside Farm & Liberation Farm & G A Seelbinder. He was sired by Housebuster who was voted the American Champion Sprint Horse in 1990 and 1991. He stood as a breeding stallion in the United States, Argentina, New Zealand and Japan with mixed results: the best of his other progeny were probably Electronic Unicorn (Hong Kong Horse of the Year in 2002) and Morluc (Woodford Stakes). Bahamian Pirate's dam, Shining Through, was an unraced daughter of the 1981 Canadian Horse of the Year Deputy Minister. Shining Through was a granddaughter of Sex Appeal, an outstanding broodmare who produced Try My Best and El Gran Senor.

In September 1996 the yearling was sent to the Keeneland sales but failed to make his reserve price of $42,000. Bahamian Pirate entered the ownership of the Lucayan Stud, the name used for the horse racing interests of Edward St. George. St. George was a British businessman who lived in the Bahamas and gave the "Bahamian" prefix to the names of many of his racehorses including Bahamian Bounty and Bahamian Knight (Derby Italiano). He was originally sent into training with Con Collins in Ireland but was moved to the stable of David "Dandy" Nicholls in Yorkshire after his second race.

== Racing career ==
=== 1998 & 1999: early career ===
Unraced as a two-year-old, Bahamian Pirate made his racecourse debut in a seven furlong maiden race at Gowran Park on 3 May 1998 when he finished fifth behind Alonzo. He failed to win in four subsequent races that year, producing his best effort when beaten a head in a maiden at Thirsk Racecourse in September. Early in the following year he finished fourth, third and second in minor races on the synthetic Fibresand surface at Southwell Racecourse before winning a five furlong maiden at Ripon in August.

=== 2000: five-year-old season ===
After finishing unplaced on his debut as a five-year-old, Bahamian Pirate won a minor handicap race at Carlisle Racecourse and then won a similar event at Southwell by eight lengths. In July he finished second in handicaps at Newmarket, Lingfield and Newmarket again before winning a six furlong handicap at Newmarket in August. Nine days after his Newmarket win the gelding contested his first important race when he carried 111 pounds in the Great St. Wilfrid Stakes and finished third behind William's Well. On 2 September he finished unplaced in a handicap before running in the Ayr Gold Cup two weeks later. Ridden by his trainer's son Adrian Nicholls he carried 112 pounds and started a 33/1 outsider in a 28-runner field which included seven other runners from the David Nicholls stable. After being restrained by Adrian Nicholls in the early stages he made rapid progress to take the lead a furlong out and won by one and a quarter lengths from Lago Di Varano. The Scotsman's correspondent described the win as "ridiculously easy", whilst David Nicholls said that he was glad that he ignored the advice of Frankie Dettori, who recommended that the horse needed to race in blinkers. Adrian Nicholls said "I thought the ground might be too soft for him but I was wrong. I've never been going so well in a sprint with two furlongs to run. I waited until I saw the furlong marker and said 'go' and he really went".

Bahamian Pirate then finished fifth in a seven furlong handicap at Newmarket and was then moved up in class for the Listed Bentinck Stakes over six furlongs at the same track on 13 October. The Cammidge Trophy winner Andreyev was made favourite with Bahamian Pirate, ridden again by Nicholls, started at odds of 9/1. Racing down the far side of the track, (the right-hand side from the jockey's viewpoint), the gelding took the lead a furlong out and won by three quarters of a length from Andreyev.

=== 2001: six-year-old season ===
Bahamian Pirate, racing in the colours of the Indian businessman Lhendup Dorji was campaigned in major weight-for-age sprints in 2001 and finished unplaced in his first five starts: the Cammidge Trophy, Abernant Stakes, Palace House Stakes, Duke of York Stakes and Golden Jubilee Stakes. He reached the frame for the first time that year on 30 June, when he finished second to the three-year-old Firebolt in the Chipchase Stakes. He then finished ninth in the Sprint Stakes before being sent to Ireland for the Phoenix Sprint Stakes at Leopardstown Racecourse on 12 August. Ridden by Johnny Murtagh he started at odds of 7/1 for a race in which the Barry Hills-trained Munjiz and the Aidan O'Brien stable's representative Freud, were made the joint-favourites. Bahamian Pirate raced in third before challenging in the final furlong and caught the leader One Won One in the last strides to win by a short head. The gelding went on to finish third in the Belgrave Stakes and third again in the Diadem Stakes before stepping up to Group One level for the first time in the Prix de l'Abbaye at Longchamp Racecourse in October. Starting a 22/1 outsider he finished strongly to take second place, half a length behind the winner Imperial Beauty. He ended the season by attempting to repeat his 2000 success in the Bentinck Stakes but was beaten into third by Danehurst and Orientor.

=== 2002 & 2003: seven and eight-year-old seasons ===
At the ages of seven and eight, Bahamian Pirate continued to race in top-class company, but failed to win a race. In twelve races in 2002 he produced his best effort in the Group One July Cup in which he finished second by half a length to Continent. He also finished second in the Phoenix Sprint Stakes and third in the Palace House Stakes. In his first attempt to win the Nunthorpe Stakes he finished eighth behind Kyllachy. In ten starts in 2003 his best results were second places in the Palace House Stakes and a minor stakes race at Goodwood Racecourse. A second bid for the Nunthorpe saw him finishing seventh behind Oasis Dream.

=== 2004: nine-year-old season ===
On his debut as a nine-year-old. Bahamian Pirate was dropped in class for a minor event at Nottingham Racecourse on 31 March. Ridden by Murtagh, he broke 26-race losing streak and won for the first time in two and a half years as he defeated Fromsong by one and a quarter lengths. In April, the gelding finished fourth to Arakan in the Abernant Stakes and fourth to Tout Seul in the Leicestershire Stakes before finishing runner-up to Steenberg at Haydock on 1 May. He kept up his busy schedule by winning at Beverley Racecourse on 8 May before finishing unplaced behind Monsieur Bond in the Duke of York Stakes three days later.

At Royal Ascot in June Bahamian Pirate ran twice without success, finishing seventh to The Tatling in the King's Stand Stakes and eighth to Fayr Jag in the Golden Jubilee Stakes. He then finished unplaced in the Chipchase Stakes and the July Cup: in the latter race he finished seventeenth of the twenty runners behind the five-year-old mare Frizzante. On 23 July, the gelding was ridden by Kieren Fallon in a minor stakes race at Newmarket and started second favourite behind the Middle Park Stakes winner Balmont. After racing towards the rear of the field he kept on strongly in the closing stages to take the lead 50 yards from the finish and won by a neck from Balmont. Six days later at Goodwood he finished sixth in the King George Stakes, two and a quarter lengths behind the winner Ringmoor Down.

On 19 August on his favoured soft ground, Bahamian Pirate, ridden by Seb Sanders, made his third attempt to win the Nunthorpe Stakes and started a 16/1 outsider in a twelve runners field. The Irish-trained One Cool Cat started favourite head of Orientor, Airwave (Cheveley Park Stakes), Balmont and The Tatling, whilst the other runners were Avonbridge, Moss Vale (Sandy Lane Stakes), Fayr Jag and Fire Up The Band (City Walls Stakes) as well as the outsiders Night Prospector and Talbot Avenue. Fire Up The Band led before Airwave took over after two furlongs with Bahamian Pirate close behind. The gelding came under pressure in the last quarter mile but stayed on strongly to overtake the weakening Airwave inside the final furlong and won by a neck from The Tatling with One Cool Cat taking third ahead of Avonbridge and Orientor. David Nicholls said "The ground is the most important thing for him. He can compete on soft ground like this. He might be nine, but he doesn't look it and he is racing full of confidence". He also commented "I suppose because of his age a few people will knock the form and suggest it was a sub-standard Nunthorpe. They can think what they like, but he is still a good horse and he might get more credit for his win if he was trained down south. Bahamian Pirate lost his way for a while but he has been running well lately and it has helped to restore his confidence. You can't let him fall out of the gate. He needs somebody to get hold of him and let him know who is boss and Seb Sanders did just that". Bahamian Pirate's performance made him the oldest horse up to that point to win a Group One race in the United Kingdom and led to his being named Britain's "star performer" for August 2004.

Bahamian Pirate failed to reproduce his York form in two subsequent starts that year, finishing unplaced in both the Haydock Sprint Cup and the Prix de l'Abbaye.

=== 2005–2007: later career ===
In 2005 Bahamian Pirate embarked on another long winless streak and finished unplaced in all eight of his starts as a ten-year-old. He failed to win again in thirteen starts as an eleven-year-old in 2006 but did produce some good performances in defeat including a third place under 125 pounds in the Wokingham Stakes. The gelding raced at Southwell in early 2007, by which time he was racing for the Dandy Nicholls Racing Club, and was beaten in his first two races. He was without a win in two and a half years and on a losing run of 25 races when he started at odds of 12/1 for a minor handicap under top weight of 130 pounds. Commenting on the gelding's return to the fibresand track his trainer had said, "he's in good form and I think he knows more about racing than I do". Ridden by Adrian Nicholls he stayed on strongly in the closing stages to win by three quarters of a length from Saviours Spirit. It proved to be his final success as he was beaten in ten subsequent races that year although he did finish second in minor handicaps at Ascot and Thirsk. The twelve-year-old ended his racecourse career by finishing fourteenth of the twenty-two runners in the Great St. Wilfrid Stakes at Ripon on 18 August 2007.

== Pedigree ==
Pedigree of Bahamian Pirate, chestnut gelding, 1995
Sire Housebuster (USA) 1987	Mt Livermore (USA); 1981	Blushing Groom	Red God
Sire Housebuster (USA) 1987	Mt Livermore (USA); 1981	Blushing Groom	Runaway Bride
Sire Housebuster (USA) 1987	Mt Livermore (USA); 1981	Flama Ardiente	Crimson Satan
Sire Housebuster (USA) 1987	Mt Livermore (USA); 1981	Flama Ardiente	Royal Rafale
Sire Housebuster (USA) 1987	Big Dreams (USA); 1980	Great Above	Minnesota Mac
Sire Housebuster (USA) 1987	Big Dreams (USA); 1980	Great Above	Ta Wee
Sire Housebuster (USA) 1987	Big Dreams (USA); 1980	Dolphins Dream	New Prospect
Sire Housebuster (USA) 1987	Big Dreams (USA); 1980	Dolphins Dream	Green Dolphin
Dam Shining Through (USA) 1989	Deputy Minister (CAN); 1979	Vice Regent	Northern Dancer
Dam Shining Through (USA) 1989	Deputy Minister (CAN); 1979	Vice Regent	Victoria Regina
Dam Shining Through (USA) 1989	Deputy Minister (CAN); 1979	Mint Copy	Bunty's Flight
Dam Shining Through (USA) 1989	Deputy Minister (CAN); 1979	Mint Copy	Shakney
Dam Shining Through (USA) 1989	Solar (CAN); 1976	Halo	Hail To Reason
Dam Shining Through (USA) 1989	Solar (CAN); 1976	Halo	Cosmah
Dam Shining Through (USA) 1989	Solar (CAN); 1976	Sex Appeal	Buckpasser
Dam Shining Through (USA) 1989	Solar (CAN); 1976	Sex Appeal	Best In Show (Family: 8-f)
