= Hopeful Stakes (Great Britain) =

Flat horse race in Britain

- Class: Listed
- Location: July Course; Newmarket, England
- Race type: Flat / Thoroughbred
- Sponsor: Jenningsbet
- Website: Newmarket

Race information
- Distance: 6f (1,207 metres)
- Surface: Turf
- Track: Straight
- Qualification: Three-years-old and up exc. G1 or G2 winners after 2021
- Weight: 9 st 0 lb (3yo); 9 st 3 lb (4yo+); Allowances 5 lb for fillies Penalties; 3 lb for Listed winners* 5 lb for Group 3 winners* * after 2021
- Purse: £52,000 (2022); 1st: £29,489

Hopeful Stakes
2026
Prince Of India	Elarak	Dubai Bling

Previous years
2025
Lethal Levi	Elmonjed	Ferrous
2024
Quinault	Russet Gold	Vadream
2023
Lezoo	Emaraaty Ana	Juan Les Pins
2022
Sam Maximus	Vadream	Manaccan
2021
Summerghand	Tabdeed	Adaay To Remember

2020-2011
2020
Brad The Brief	Summerghand	Highland Dress
2019
Raucous	Pretty Pollyanna	Rock On Baileys
2018
Limato	Top Score	Projection
2017
Gifted Master	Steady Pace	Intisaab
2016
Windfast	Buying Trouble	Baccarat
2015
Polybius	Naadirr	Lucky Kristale
2014
Tropics	Alben Star	Reckless Abandon
2013
Tropics	Nocturn	Master Of War
2012
Hitchens	Markab	Sirius Prospect
2011
Swiss Dream	Son Of The Cat	Royal Rock

2010-2001
2010
Doncaster Rover	Advanced	Dafeef
2009
Palace Moon	Swiss Diva	Jimmy Styles
2008
Edge Closer	Balthazaar's Gift	Strike The Deal
2007
Beckermet	Balthazaar's Gift	Biniou
2006
Appalachian Trail	Assertive	Sunderland Echo
2005
Quito	Lafi	Traytonic
2004
Prince Aaron	Atavus	Red Romeo
2003
Fayr Jag	Somnus	Barrantes
2002
Three Points	Mugharreb	Affaire Royale
2001
Mugharreb	Welcome Friend	Eastern Purple

2000-1991
2000
Vision of Night	Littlefeather	Ho Leng
1999
Arkadian Hero	Ho Leng	Grangeville
1998
Tipsy Creek	Bold Edge	Bayleaf
1997
Elnadim	Bollin Joanne	Almushtarak
1996
Carranita	Atraf	Rambling Bear
1995
Cheyenne Spirit	Royale Figurine	Easy Dollar
1994
Rafferty's Rules	Risky	Montendre
1993
Stack Rock	Garah	King's Signet
1992
Rose Indien	Hamas	Fylde Flyer
1991
Montendre	Gentle Hero	Katzakeena

1990-1988
1990
Tadwin	La Grange Music	Rivers Rhapsody
1989
Alo Ez	Hafir	Green's Canaletto
1988
Point Of Light	Young Hal	Ohsomellow

The Hopeful Stakes is a Listed flat horse race in Great Britain open to horses aged three years or older. It is run on the July Course at Newmarket over a distance of 6 furlongs (1,207 metres), and it is scheduled to take place each year in August.

== Winners ==
Year	Winner	Age	Jockey	Trainer	Time
1986	Hallgate	3	John Reid	Sally Hall	1:12.93
1987	Print	3	Bruce Raymond	William Hastings-Bass	1:12.84
1988	Point Of Light	3	Paul Eddery	Geoff Lewis	1:11.96
1989	Alo Ez	3	Dean McKeown	Jeff Pearce	1:13.04
1990	Tadwin	3	Willie Carson	Peter Walwyn	1:13.41
1991	Montendre	4	Steve Cauthen	Matt McCormack	1:19.09
1992	Rose Indien	3	Frankie Dettori	Mohammed Moubarak	1:12.60
1993	Stack Rock	6	Kieren Fallon	Eric Alston	1:11.87
1994	Rafferty's Rules	3	Kieren Fallon	Lynda Ramsden	1:10.98
1995	Cheyenne Spirit	3	John Stack	Ben Hanbury	1:10.35
1996	Carranita	6	Tim Sprake	Bryn Palling	1:14.73
1997	Elnadim	3	Michael Kinane	John Dunlop	1:11.04
1998	Tipsy Creek	4	Richard Hills	Ben Hanbury	1:10.90
1999	Arkadian Hero	4	Gérald Mossé	Luca Cumani	1:10.26
2000	Vision Of Night	4	Pat Eddery	John Dunlop	1:12.96
2001	Mugharreb	3	Kieren Fallon	Ben Hanbury	1:11.58
2002	Three Points	5	Frankie Dettori	Saeed bin Suroor	1:11.30
2003	Fayr Jag	4	Willie Supple	Tim Easterby	1:11.62
2004	Prince Aaron	4	Gary Carter	Conrad Allen	1:14.02
2005	Quito	8	Jamie Spencer	David Chapman	1:13.22
2006	Appalachian Trail	5	Tom Eaves	Ian Semple	1:15.33
2007	Beckermet	5	Chris Catlin	Roger Fisher	1:12.53
2008	Edge Closer	4	Ryan Moore	Richard Hannon Sr.	1:10.32
2009	Palace Moon	4	Steve Drowne	Hughie Morrison	1:10.33
2010	Doncaster Rover	4	Robert Winston	David Brown	1:13.02
2011	Swiss Dream	3	Nicky Mackay	David Elsworth	1:11.24
2012	Hitchens	7	Martin Dwyer	David Barron	1:10.88
2013	Tropics	5	Jim Crowley	Dean Ivory	1:13.30
2014	Tropics	6	Robert Winston	Dean Ivory	1:09.84
2015	Polybius	4	Ted Durcan	David Lanigan	1:11.26
2016	Windfast	5	Richard Kingscote	Brian Meehan	1:12.52
2017	Gifted Master	4	Pat Smullen	Hugo Palmer	1:09.68
2018	Limato	6	Martin Harley	Henry Candy	1:11.79
2019	Raucous	6	Alistair Rawlinson	Robert Cowell	1:11.75
2020	Brad The Brief	3	Richard Kingscote	Tom Dascombe	1:12.26
2021	Summerghand	7	Martin Harley	David O'Meara	1:11.67
2022	Sam Maximus	3	P. J. McDonald	James Horton	1:12.16
2023	Lezoo	3	Andrea Atzeni	Ralph Beckett	1:12.06
2024	Quinault	4	Marco Ghiani	Stuart Williams	1:13.19
2025	Lethal Levi	6	Sam James	Karl Burke	1:10.88

== See also ==
- Horse racing in Great Britain
- List of British flat horse races
