= Tamarisk (horse) =

Irish-bred Thoroughbred racehorse

- Sire: Green Desert
- Grandsire: Danzig
- Dam: Sine Labe
- Damsire: Vaguely Noble
- Sex: Stallion
- Foaled: 19 May 1995
- Country: Ireland
- Colour: Bay
- Breeder: Mount Coote Stud
- Owner: Highclere Thoroughbred Racing; Highland Farms; George Hofmeister; V.A.G. Racing
- Trainer: Roger Charlton; D. Wayne Lukas; Elliot Walden; Wayne Mogge
- Record: 25: 5-4-1
- Earnings: $338,795

Major wins
- Haydock Sprint Cup (1998)

Awards
- European Champion Sprinter (1998)

Tamarisk was an Irish-bred champion Thoroughbred racehorse. After showing high class form as a two-year-old in 1997, Tamarisk was named European Champion Sprinter at the 1998 Cartier Racing Awards following a campaign which was highlighted by a win in the Group One Haydock Sprint Cup. Tamarisk was retired after an abortive attempt at the Breeders' Cup Sprint, but failed as a stallion owing to fertility problems. He returned to racing for three further seasons (2000–2002) but was unable to replicate his earlier success. From 2002 to 2006 he returned to stud with marginally better results.

== Background ==
Tamarisk was bred in Ireland by the County Limerick based Mount Coote Stud. His sire, Green Desert, finished second to Dancing Brave in the 2000 Guineas and became a leading sprinter, winning the July Cup. Apart from Tamarisk, he sired the winners of over 1,000 races, including Oasis Dream, Desert Prince, Sheikh Albadou and Cape Cross, the sire of Sea the Stars. Tamarisk's dam Sine Labe was unraced but came from a good family, being a half sister of the Prix Saint-Alary winner Treble and a close relative of the multiple Group One winning racemare Triptych. Tamarisk was sent as a yearling to the Tattersalls sales in October 1996, where he was sold for 78,000gns to John Warren, a director of Highclere Thoroughbred Racing syndicate.

== Early racing career ==
=== 1997: two-year-old season ===
Tamarisk made his debut in a maiden race at Goodwood in August. He started 11/4 joint favourite and justified his position by taking the lead a furlong out and winning by a length. In September he ran in a minor stakes race at Kempton and produced an excellent performance, accelerating clear of the field and winning "comfortably" by six lengths from the future Group Race winners Greek Dance and Lear Spear.

Three weeks after his Kempton win Tamarisk was sent to Newmarket for the Tattersalls Houghton Sales Conditions Stakes over seven furlongs and was made 5/4 favourite. He led from the start and was never challenged, pulling away in the closing stages to win by three and a half lengths. Tamarisk was unbeaten in three races and was well fancied for the Group One Dewhurst Stakes at Newmarket in October. for which he was supplemented for a fee of £18,000. He was sent into the lead and proved the best of the English-trained colts but was no match for the "impressive" French colt Xaar, and finished second, beaten seven lengths. He earned £36,000 for finishing second, prompting Harry Herbert, the head of the Highclere syndicate to say that "we were best of the British and are delighted. We have got a Group horse."

=== 1998: three-year-old season ===
On his three-year-old debut Tamarisk was sent straight for the 2000 Guineas over a mile at Newmarket without a trial race. He showed good early speed to lead until the final quarter mile but weakened badly and finished sixteenth of the eighteen runners. For the rest of the season he was campaigned over sprint distances.

Four weeks after his Guineas defeat, Tamarisk ran in a Listed race over six furlongs at Lingfield. He tracked the leaders before accelerating clear in the closing stages to win by two and a half lengths from Arkadian Hero. In the Group One July Cup at Newmarket Tamarisk was never able to catch the front-running Elnadim but stayed on well to hold second place in a field of seventeen.

Tamarisk started 13/2 for the Group One Sprint Cup at Haydock in September. The field was a strong one, including Elnadim as well as the winners of the King's Stand Stakes (Bolshoi) and the Nunthorpe Stakes (Lochangel). Ridden by Tim Sprake, he led from the start and produced a "blistering charge" to move into a clear lead a furlong out. He ran on strongly, despite drifting left in the closing stages, to record his most important victory, beating Bolshoi by one and three quarter lengths with Elnadim and Lochangel unplaced.

In September it was announced that Tamarisk had been sold as a prospective stallion to the Coolmore Stud for £3,500,000 and would retire at the end of the year. A plan to run Tamarisk in the Breeders' Cup Sprint in what was intended to be his final race ended in controversy and recrimination. He was sent to the United States at the end of September where he was to be conditioned for the race by D. Wayne Lukas. Charlton had said that the colt was short of peak fitness and expected that he should be prepared for the race with a series of training gallops. Lukas however, decided to give Tamarisk a prep race on dirt at Keeneland in which the colt put in a poor performance and finished last. The Breeders’ Cup handicappers took the view that the form Tamarisk had displayed in the race was below the required standard and excluded the colt from the Sprint field. Harry Herbert, representing Highclere, called it "a mind-blowing decision, which sets an appalling precedent." An aggravating feature for Tamarisk's connections was that Bolshoi, rated five pounds inferior on European form, was allowed to take part and was beaten less than four lengths.

== Stud career ==
In 1999 Tamarisk stood as a stallion at the Coolmore Stud in Ireland. After he failed to get any of his first twelve mares "in foal" (pregnant), doubts about his fertility surfaced. Following veterinary tests it was decided that Tamarisk would be withdrawn from stud duties and resume his racing career. Five foals were eventually born in Tamarisk's first crop of foals.

After his second retirement Tamarisk stood as a stallion at Ballykisteen Stud in County Tipperary and Bracklyn Stud in County Westmeath until 2006 at a reported fee of €4,000, but despite reports that he had regained his fertility he produced few foals. In all, fifteen horses sired by Tamarisk reached the racecourse, five of whom were winners.

== Later racing career ==
=== 2000: five-year-old season ===
Tamarisk returned to racing as a five-year-old, running in the ownership of Highland Stables and trained by Elliot Walden. He ran three times without reaching the frame, his best performance coming when he ran fifth in the John Henry Stakes at Arlington Park in August.

=== 2001: six-year-old season ===
In 2001 Tamarisk returned to England and the stable of Roger Charlton who was reported as being "very excited" to have the horse back. Now running in the colours of George Hofmeister, he made six appearances without winning. He did show some glimpses of his old form in June, when he was beaten a short head in a Listed race at Windsor and finished sixth of twenty-two runners in the King's Stand Stakes at Royal Ascot.

=== 2002: seven-year-old season ===
In 2002, Tamarisk was sold to V.A.G. Racing and sent back across the Atlantic to join the stable of Wayne Mogge. He ran seven times, mainly in allowance company, never finishing better than third. On his last start he finished eighth of ten runners in the Nureyev Stakes at Keeneland in October.

== Assessment ==
At the Cartier Racing Awards in November 1998 Tamarisk was chosen ahead of Elnadim as European Champion Sprinter. The award was seen as a "consolation" after his treatment by the Breeders' Cup handicappers. In the official International Classification, published in January 1999, Tamarisk was rated on 120, one pound below Elnadim.

== Pedigree ==
Pedigree of Tamarisk (IRE), bay stallion, 1995
Sire Green Desert (USA) 1983	Danzig; 1977	Northern Dancer*	Nearctic
Sire Green Desert (USA) 1983	Danzig; 1977	Northern Dancer*	Natalma
Sire Green Desert (USA) 1983	Danzig; 1977	Pas de Nom	Admirals Voyage
Sire Green Desert (USA) 1983	Danzig; 1977	Pas de Nom	Petitioner
Sire Green Desert (USA) 1983	Foreign Courier; 1979	Sir Ivor	Sir Gaylord
Sire Green Desert (USA) 1983	Foreign Courier; 1979	Sir Ivor	Attica
Sire Green Desert (USA) 1983	Foreign Courier; 1979	Courtly Dee	Never Bend
Sire Green Desert (USA) 1983	Foreign Courier; 1979	Courtly Dee	Tulle
Dam Sine Labe (USA) 1986	Vaguely Noble; 1965	Vienna	Aureole
Dam Sine Labe (USA) 1986	Vaguely Noble; 1965	Vienna	Turkish Blood
Dam Sine Labe (USA) 1986	Vaguely Noble; 1965	Noble Lassie	Nearco
Dam Sine Labe (USA) 1986	Vaguely Noble; 1965	Noble Lassie	Belle Sauvage
Dam Sine Labe (USA) 1986	Trevilla; 1981	Lyphard	Northern Dancer*
Dam Sine Labe (USA) 1986	Trevilla; 1981	Lyphard	Goofed
Dam Sine Labe (USA) 1986	Trevilla; 1981	Trillion	Hail To Reason
Dam Sine Labe (USA) 1986	Trevilla; 1981	Trillion	Margarethen(Family: 4-n)

- Tamarisk is inbred 3 × 4 to Northern Dancer. This means that the stallion appears in both the third and fourth generations of his pedigree.
