= Fayr Jag =

Irish-bred Thoroughbred racehorse

- Sire: Fayruz
- Grandsire: Song
- Dam: Lominda
- Damsire: Lomond
- Sex: Gelding
- Foaled: 17 May 1999
- Country: Ireland
- Colour: Bay
- Breeder: Canice M Farrell Jnr
- Owner: TEF Freight; Jonathan Gill
- Trainer: Tim Easterby
- Record: 64: 11-7-5
- Earnings: £423,367

Major wins
- Wokingham Stakes (2003); Hopeful Stakes (2003); Ridgewood Pearl Stakes (2003); Golden Jubilee Stakes (2004); Chipchase Stakes (2006); Hackwood Stakes (2006)

Fayr Jag (17 May 1999 – 21 April 2008) was an Irish-bred, British-trained Thoroughbred racehorse. Trained throughout his racing career in Yorkshire by Tim Easterby he was a durable sprinter who ran 64 times and won eleven races in seven seasons between 2001 and 2007. After winning a minor race in each of his first two seasons he made his first major impact as a four-year-old by winning two handicap races before dead-heating for first place in the Wokingham Stakes at Royal Ascot. Later that year he was moved up in class and added victories in the Hopeful Stakes and the Ridgewood Pearl Stakes. In the following year he recorded his biggest win when he defeated a top-class field to win the Group One Golden Jubilee Stakes. He was then without a win for two years before returning to form to win the Chipchase Stakes and the Hackwood Stakes in 2006. Fayr Jag failed to win in 2007 and died after injuring himself in the starting stalls on what was intended to be his first race of 2008.

== Background ==
Fayr Jag was a bay gelding with no white markings bred by Canice M Farrell Jnr. at the Knockatrina House Stud in County Laois, Ireland. His was sired by Fayruz, a precocious sprinter who won six of his first seven races as a two-year-old in 1985 but whose later career was affected by injury problems. As a breeding stallion he also sired Inxile (Prix de Saint-Georges) and Monkston Point (Leisure Stakes). Fayr Jag's dam Lominda showed modest ability as a racehorse, recording her only success in a maiden race at Yarmouth Racecourse in 1990. She was descended from the American broodmare Quick Touch who was the ancestor of several major winners including Run the Gantlet and Afleet Alex.

In September 2000 the yearling colt was offered for sale at Doncaster and was bought for 8,000 guineas by the trainer Tim Easterby. He entered the ownership of TEF Freight and was trained throughout his racing career by Easterby at his Habton Grange stable in North Yorkshire.

== Racing career ==
=== 2001 & 2002: early career ===
Fayr Jag began his racing career by finishing second in a minor race over five furlongs at Thirsk Racecourse in May 2001 and recorded his first success in a maiden race over the same course and distance on 4 August. He then finished second at Chester Racecourse before running unplaced behind Acclamation in a valuable sales race at Doncaster in September. He ended his first season by finishing sixth in a minor race at Catterick Racecourse in October.

After finishing unplaced on his three-year-old debut Fayr Jag ran third in a minor race at Warwick before winning a six furlong handicap race at Ripon on 27 April. He went on to contest more valuable handicaps, finishing second at Newmarket in May and fifth at York on 15 June. Two weeks later he recorded his second success of the year as he carried 120 pounds to victory in a six furlong handicap at Newmarket. He then entered the ownership of Jonathan Gill in whose colours he raced for the rest of his racing career. After finishing second in a handicap at Newmarket on 9 July he started favourite for a similar event over the same course and distance in August but reared up and unseated his jockey exiting the stalls.

=== 2003: four-year-old season ===
Fayr Jag began his third season by finishing second at Beverley in April and then ran third in a handicap at York in May. At Pontefract Racecourse on 1 June he carried top weight of 132 pounds to victory in a six furlong handicap and then followed up by winning in a similar event at York twelve days later. On 21 June at Royal Ascot Fayr Jag was one of 29 horses to contest the Wokingham Stakes over six furlongs. Ridden as in most of his previous races by Willie Supple he carried a weight of 130 pounds and started at odds of 10/1 in a field which included The Tatling and Patavellian. Racing up the stands-side (the left-hand side from the jockeys' viewpoint) Fayr Jag tracked the leaders before going to the front inside the final furlong and finished in a dead heat for first place with the John Hammond-trained Ratio, who raced up the opposite side of the course.

In August the gelding finished eighth of the twenty-nine runners behind Patavellian in the Stewards' Cup at Goodwood before being stepped up in class to contest the Listed Hopeful Stakes on good-to-firm ground at Newmarket and started 11/8 second choice in the betting behind the improving three-year-old Somnus. After behind restrained by Supple in the early stages he went to the front in the final furlong and held off the late challenge of Somnus to win by a neck.

On much softer ground at Haydock Park on 6 September he started a 25/1 outsider for the Group One Stanley Leisure Sprint Cup and finished fifth of ten behind Somnus. Six days after his defeat at Haydock, Fayr Jag was sent to Ireland to contest the Group Three Ridgewood Pearl Stakes over six furlongs at the Curragh with Kevin Darley taking over the ride from Supple. Coming from the rear of the field he passed horse after horse in the last quarter mile, overtook the John Oxx-trained Hanabad in the final strides and won by a head with a gap of two and a half lengths back to the favourite Avonbridge in third.

Fayr Jag failed to win or place in his two remaining races in 2003: he finished unplaced behind Acclamation in the Diadem Stakes before ending his season in the Bentinck Stakes in October. He appeared to be traveling well just behind the leaders when he stumbled and unseated Willie Supple in the final furlong. Supple, who received cuts and bruises in the fall, received a six-day ban from the racecourse stewards for "careless riding".

=== 2004: five-year-old season ===
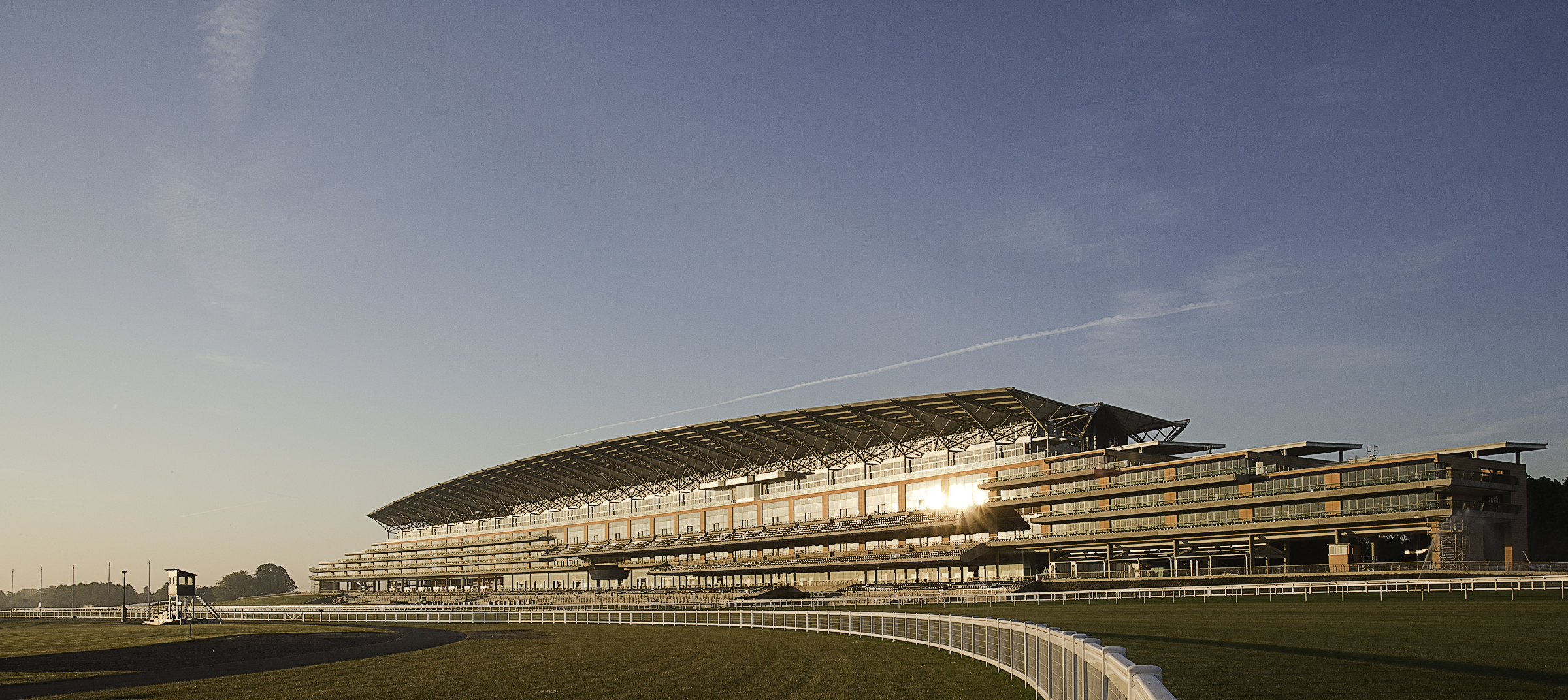
Ascot Racecourse: the site of two of Fayr Jag's major wins

On his first appearance as a five-year-old Fayr Jag ran poorly as he finished thirteenth of the fifteen runners behind Monsieur Bond in the Duke of York Stakes on good-to-soft ground 11 May. On 19 June the gelding ran for the second time at Royal Ascot when he was one of fourteen horses to contest the Group One Golden Jubilee Stakes over six furlongs on firm ground. Avonbridge started favourite ahead of Airwave, Monsieur Bond, Cape of Good Hope and Crystal Castle (2002 Diadem Stakes) with Fayr Jag next in the betting on 12/1. The other runners included Ashdown Express (Bentinck Stakes), Polar Way (Boland Stakes), Twilight Blues (2003 Duke of York Stakes), Night's Cross (Tipperary Stakes), Country Reel (Gimcrack Stakes), Steenberg (Wentworth Stakes) and Bahamian Pirate. After racing in mid-division Fayr Jag made a forward move at half-distance and took the lead a quarter of a mile from the finish. Despite hanging slightly right in the closing stages he was driven out by Supple to win by a head from Crystal Castle with Cape of Good Hope ahead away in third. Easterby was not present, choosing to attend his local course at Redcar where he saddled the winner of a selling race. Willie Supple said "To win a Group One is very special for me. I suppose it will be champagne all round for the boys". He went on to say that Fayr Jag "has had his problems over the years - he broke a bone in his head in the stalls, and I fell off him at Newmarket last year. He travelled well all the way and got a good lead, but probably got there too soon and just held on in the end".

Fayr Jag failed to win or place in his four subsequent races that year all of which were run on soft or heavy ground. He finished thirteenth behind Frizzante in the July Cup and tenth of twelve behind Bahamian Pirate in the Nunthorpe Stakes before being sent to Germany where he finished ninth in the Group Two Goldene Peitsche. On his final appearance of the season he was sent to Japan for the Sprinters Stakes at Nakayama Racecourse in October and finished last of the sixteen runners behind Calstone Light.

=== 2005: six-year-old season ===
Fayr Jag failed to win in twelve starts as a six-year-old. He began by contesting Group races, and finished unplaced in the Duke of York Stakes, Temple Stakes, King's Stand Stakes (run that year at York) and the Chipchase Stakes before being dropped to Listed class in July when he finished fourth in the Hackwood Stakes and third in the Queensferry Stakes. He was moved back up in class in August and finished unplaced in the Phoenix Sprint Stakes and a close sixth to La Cucaracha in the Nunthorpe Stakes before running fifth behind Goodricke in the Haydock Sprint Cup. After finishing second to Patavellian in a minor race at Yarmouth Racecourse he contested the Diadem Stake (run that year at Newmarket) and produced his best effort of the season. Ridden by Richard Quinn he took the lead inside the final furlong but was caught in the final strides and was beaten a neck into second place by the 20/1 outsider Baron's Pit. On his last run of the season he was reunited with Supple for the final time in the Guisborough Stakes at Redcar and started favourite but finished seventh behind Council Member.

=== 2006: seven-year-old season ===
In his first three starts in 2006 Fayr Jag was unplaced in the Duke of York Stakes, Leisure Stakes and King's Stand Stakes. after which David Allan took over from Quinn as his regular jockey. On 1 July he started favourite for the Group Three Chipchase Stakes over six furlongs on good-to-firm ground at Newcastle and recorded his first win in over two years as he took the lead approaching the final furlong and won by half a length from Beckermet.

After finishing unplaced behind Les Arcs in the July Cup, the gelding contested the Hackwood Stakes at Newbury on 22 July. The Wokingham Stakes winner Baltic King started favourite ahead of Balthazaar's Gift (runner-up in the July Cup) and Ashdown Express with Fayr Jag starting a 16/1 outsider in a seven-runner field. After racing in second place Fayr Jag went to the front a furlong out and held on in a blanket finish to win by a neck from the 25/1 outsider Kodiac, with Tawwaassol, Balthazaar's Gift, Baltic King and Ashdown Express close behind.

Fayr Jag failed to win in his six remaining races in 2006. He finished unplaced in the King George Stakes, Phoenix Sprint Stakes, and Nuthorpe Stakes before running fourth under a weight of 140 pounds in the Scarbrough Stakes. He again ran well in the Diadem Stakes, leading for most of the way before finishing a close third to Red Clubs and Baltic King. He ended the year by finishing fifth in the Bentinck Stakes on 15 October.

=== 2007: eight-year-old season ===
Fayr Jag began his seventh season by finishing third in the Michael Foster Stakes at Thirsk in April but finished no better than fifth in his remaining nine races. He ran unplaced in the Duke of York Stakes, Leisure Stakes. Golden Jubilee Stakes, Chipchase Stakes, Hackwood Stakes, Stewards' Cup, Great St. Wilfrid Stakes, and the Beverley Bullet. On his final appearance he finished ninth to King's Apostle in a handicap at York on 9 September.

== Death ==
On 21 April 2008, Fayr Jag was scheduled to begin his eighth campaign in a minor race at Pontefract. After entering the starting stalls he attempted to back out but then abruptly lunged forwards, colliding with the front of the stalls. He sustained a broken shoulder and was euthanised shortly afterwards.

== Pedigree ==
Pedigree of Fayr Jag (IRE), bay gelding, 1999
| Sire Fayruz (GB) 1983 | Song (GB); 1966 | Sing Sing | Tudor Minstrel |
| Sire Fayruz (GB) 1983 | Song (GB); 1966 | Sing Sing | Agin The Law |
| Sire Fayruz (GB) 1983 | Song (GB); 1966 | Intent | Vilmorin |
| Sire Fayruz (GB) 1983 | Song (GB); 1966 | Intent | Under Canvas |
| Sire Fayruz (GB) 1983 | Friendly Jester (GB); 1973 | Be Friendly | Skymaster |
| Sire Fayruz (GB) 1983 | Friendly Jester (GB); 1973 | Be Friendly | Lady Sliptic |
| Sire Fayruz (GB) 1983 | Friendly Jester (GB); 1973 | Lady Jester | Bleep-Bleep |
| Sire Fayruz (GB) 1983 | Friendly Jester (GB); 1973 | Lady Jester | Witcracker |
| Dam Lominda (IRE) 1988 | Lomond (USA); 1980 | Northern Dancer | Nearctic |
| Dam Lominda (IRE) 1988 | Lomond (USA); 1980 | Northern Dancer | Natalma |
| Dam Lominda (IRE) 1988 | Lomond (USA); 1980 | My Charmer | Poker |
| Dam Lominda (IRE) 1988 | Lomond (USA); 1980 | My Charmer | Fair Charmer |
| Dam Lominda (IRE) 1988 | Olinda (GB); 1977 | Sassafras | Sheshoon |
| Dam Lominda (IRE) 1988 | Olinda (GB); 1977 | Sassafras | Ruta |
| Dam Lominda (IRE) 1988 | Olinda (GB); 1977 | Jodee Zee | Jim J. |
| Dam Lominda (IRE) 1988 | Olinda (GB); 1977 | Jodee Zee | Shawl (Family: 5-g) |
