= Nuclear Debate =

American-bred Thoroughbred racehorse

- Sire: Geiger Counter
- Grandsire: Mr. Prospector
- Dam: I'm An Issue
- Damsire: Cox's Ridge
- Sex: Gelding
- Foaled: 8 February 1995 (age 30)
- Country: United States
- Colour: Bay
- Breeder: Iron County Farms Inc.
- Owner: Bob Chester; Herrick Racing
- Trainer: Lynda Ramsden; John Hammond; Darrell Vienna
- Record: 44:10-8-7 (52)
- Earnings: £659,543

Major wins
- Premio Omenoni (1999); Prix du Gros Chêne (2000); King's Stand Stakes (2000); Nunthorpe Stakes (2000); Haydock Sprint Cup (2001); Nearctic Stakes (2002)

Awards
- European Champion Sprinter (2000)

Nuclear Debate (foaled 1995) was an American-bred Thoroughbred racehorse. A specialist sprinter, he competed from 1997 until 2003, winning at least ten races. He campaigned in Britain for two seasons with moderate success before being transferred to France in 1999. In the following season, as a five-year-old, he reached his peak, winning the Prix du Gros Chêne, King's Stand Stakes and Nunthorpe Stakes and being named European Champion Sprinter. In the following year he won the Haydock Sprint Cup before being sold and exported to the United States where he raced for two further seasons with mixed results.

== Background ==
Nuclear Debate was a bay horse bred in Kentucky by Iron County Farms Inc. His sire Geiger Counter was a moderate racehorse but had an exceptional pedigree, being a son of Mr. Prospector and Thong. He was therefore a half-brother to Thatch and to Special, the dam of Nureyev and grand-dam of Sadler's Wells. Nuclear Debate's dam I'm An Issue was the granddaughter of Bourbon Mist who was also the female-line ancestor of the dual Prix Royal-Oak winner Amilynx. As a foal he was sold for $57,000 to a partnership of owners headed by Bob Chester. Nuclear Debate was sent to race in the United Kingdom, where he entered training with Lynda Ramsden in Yorkshire.

== Racing career ==
=== 1997–1998: United Kingdom ===
Nuclear Debate ran six times as a two-year-old in 1997 without winning. He finished second in two maiden races and produced his best effort when running third under a weight of 120 pounds (54 kg) in a Nursery Handicap at Newmarket Racecourse. In the following year, he recorded his first win at the ninth attempt when he won a six furlong maiden race at Thirsk in May. He went on to prove himself a useful sprint handicapper, winning the Gosforth Park Cup at Newcastle and finishing second in the Portland Handicap at Doncaster. By the end of the season he had an official rating of 99, suggesting that he was at least 20 pounds below championship class. At the end of 1998 Lynda Ramsden decided to give up her training licence and the gelding was sent to join the stable of John Hammond in France.

=== 1999–2001: France ===
In 1999 Hammond campaigned the gelding at Group Three and Listed class. He won the Prix Hampton at Maisons-Laffitte and the Prix du Cercle at Deauville and was placed in the Prix de Meautry, World Trophy and Prix du Petit Couvert. As a gelding, Nuclear Debate was not allowed to compete in France's most important sprint, the Prix de l'Abbaye at Longchamp in October. Instead, he was sent to Italy where he claimed his first Group race on his twenty-third appearance when he won the Premio Omenoni over 1,000 metres (1,100 yd) at Milan. He ended the year with an unplaced effort in the Hong Kong Sprint at Sha Tin.

Nuclear Debate's championship season began when he finished sixth behind Sampower Star in the Prix de Saint-Georges at Longchamp in May. A month later he started at odds of 7/1 for the Group Two Prix du Gros Chêne at Chantilly Racecourse. Ridden by Gérald Mossé he recorded his most important success up to that point as he caught the British challenger Watching in the final strides to win by a head. Two and a half weeks later Nuclear Debate was made a 16/1 outsider for the King's Stand Stakes (then a Group Two race) at Royal Ascot. Mosse restrained the gelding in the early stages before moving up to take the lead a furlong from the finish and win by one and a half lengths from the Japanese-trained Agnes World. In August Nuclear Debate was moved up to Group One class for the first time in the Nunthorpe Stakes over five furlongs at York. Starting the 5/2 favourite he won by one and a quarter lengths from Bertolini after taking the lead a furlong out. He was again sent to Sha Tin in December, and again finished unplaced in the Hong Kong Sprint.

In early 2001, Nuclear Debate was sent to Dubai, where he finished fourth on dirt behind the American-trained Caller One in the Dubai Golden Shaheen. On his return to Europe he finished third when favourite for the Temple Stakes and second to the Irish-trained Mozart in the Nunthorpe Stakes. He recorded his second Group One win at Haydock Park in September. In the Sprint Cup he was restrained by Mosse in the early stages before finishing strongly to win by three lengths from Mount Abu. A change in the race conditions allowed Nuclear Debate to run in the Prix de l'Abbaye in October, but despite starting favourite he finished unplaced behind his stable companion Imperial Beauty.

On October 31, 2001, Nuclear Debate was offered for sale at the Tattersalls sale at Newmarket, where he was bought for 180,000 guineas by the American trainer Darrell Vienna.

=== 2001–2003: United States ===
Nuclear Debate began his American career by finishing fifth (when given an allegedly poor ride) in the Grade III Hollywood Turk Express in November and then finished unplaced for the third time in the Hong Kong Sprint. He remained in training for two further season with mixed results. His best efforts were a win in the Grade II Nearctic Stakes at Woodbine Racetrack in June 2002 and a third place in the Atto Mile at the same track three months later.

== Assessment and honours ==
Nuclear Debate was voted European Champion Sprinter at the 2000 Cartier Racing Awards.

== Pedigree ==
Pedigree of Nuclear Debate (USA), bay gelding, 1995
Sire Geiger Counter (USA) 1982	Mr. Prospector (USA); 1970	Raise a Native	Native Dancer
Sire Geiger Counter (USA) 1982	Mr. Prospector (USA); 1970	Raise a Native	Raise You
Sire Geiger Counter (USA) 1982	Mr. Prospector (USA); 1970	Gold Digger	Nashua
Sire Geiger Counter (USA) 1982	Mr. Prospector (USA); 1970	Gold Digger	Sequence
Sire Geiger Counter (USA) 1982	Thong (USA); 1964	Nantallah	Nasrullah
Sire Geiger Counter (USA) 1982	Thong (USA); 1964	Nantallah	Shimmer
Sire Geiger Counter (USA) 1982	Thong (USA); 1964	Rough Shod	Gold Bridge
Sire Geiger Counter (USA) 1982	Thong (USA); 1964	Rough Shod	Dalmary
Dam I'm An Issue (USA) 1990	Cox's Ridge (USA); 1974	Best Turn	Turn-To
Dam I'm An Issue (USA) 1990	Cox's Ridge (USA); 1974	Best Turn	Sweet Clementine
Dam I'm An Issue (USA) 1990	Cox's Ridge (USA); 1974	Our Martha	Ballydonnell
Dam I'm An Issue (USA) 1990	Cox's Ridge (USA); 1974	Our Martha	Corday
Dam I'm An Issue (USA) 1990	Answers n' Issues (CAN); 1981	Jacinto	Bold Ruler
Dam I'm An Issue (USA) 1990	Answers n' Issues (CAN); 1981	Jacinto	Cascade
Dam I'm An Issue (USA) 1990	Answers n' Issues (CAN); 1981	Bourbon Mist	Double Jay
Dam I'm An Issue (USA) 1990	Answers n' Issues (CAN); 1981	Bourbon Mist	Islay Mist (Family: 4-m)
