= Stravinsky (horse) =

American-bred Thoroughbred racehorse (1996–2023)

- Racing colours of Michael Tabor
- Sire: Nureyev
- Grandsire: Northern Dancer
- Dam: Fire The Groom
- Damsire: Blushing Groom
- Sex: Stallion
- Foaled: 1 March 1996
- Died: 21 November 2023 (aged 27); Japan
- Country: United States
- Colour: Bay
- Breeder: R. D. Hubbard, E. C. Allred & C. Sczesny
- Owner: Sue Magnier & Michael Tabor
- Trainer: Aidan O'Brien
- Record: 8: 3-1-1
- Earnings: £ 225,600

Major wins
- July Cup (1999); Nunthorpe Stakes (1999)

Awards
- European Champion Sprinter (1999)
- Last updated on 25 August 2007

Stravinsky (1 March 1996 – 21 November 2023) was an American-bred, Irish-trained Thoroughbred racehorse and sire. In a racing career from August 1998 until November 1999, he ran eight times and won three races. He showed promising form as a two-year-old and was regarded as a serious contender for the British Classic Races. However, he ran disappointingly over distances of seven furlongs and one mile in early 1999. He reverted to sprint distances to record impressive wins in the July Cup and the Nunthorpe Stakes, earning the title of European Champion Sprinter. At the end of the season, he retired to stud where he had some success as a sire of winners.

== Background ==
Stravinsky was a powerfully built bay horse standing 15.3 hands high, with a white star and a white sock on his near foreleg. He was sired by the disqualified 2000 Guineas winner Nureyev out of the mare Fire The Groom. Apart from Stravinsky, Nureyev was the sire of the winners of at least forty-five Group One/Grade I including Peintre Celebre, Spinning World, Zilzal, Fasliyev and Wolfhound. His career as a stallion has been described as "outstanding". Stravinsky's dam Fire The Groom won the Grade I Beverly D. Stakes in 1991 and was a half sister of the Haydock Sprint Cup winner Dowsing.

Stravinsky was sent to the Keeneland Sales as a yearling in July 1997, where he was bought for $625,000 by the bloodstock agent Dermot "Demi" O'Byrne, acting on behalf of John Magnier and his Coolmore organisation. He was sent into training with Aidan O'Brien at Ballydoyle and was ridden in all of his races by Michael Kinane.

== Racing career ==
=== 1998: two-year-old season ===
Although he was trained throughout his career in Ireland, Stravinsky was sent to England for his first appearance, when he ran in a maiden race at York in August. Before he arrived in for the race he had established a reputation as a potentially exceptional horse on the strength of his home performances. He tracked the leaders and, having had problems obtaining a clear run, quickened away from his rivals to record an "impressive" two length win. Despite the modest status of the race Stravinsky was briefly made favourite for the following year's 2000 Guineas at odds as short as 4/1.

A month later, Stravinsky was moved directly up to Group One class for the Prix de la Salamandre at Longchamp. He was last of the five runners entering the straight, and although he showed what one correspondent described as "a dazzling change of gear" to move into second he was unable to catch the front-running Aljabr and finished second, beaten half a length, with the rest of the runners a further four lengths back. He had drifted to the right when making his challenge and the stewards, taking the view that he had interfered with other runners, demoted him from second to last place.

On his third and final start of the season, Stravinsky was sent to England again for the Group One Dewhurst Stakes at Newmarket for which he started 13/8 joint-favourite, having reportedly shown "sparkling" form in home trails. He was held up in the early stages but despite having "every chance" he was unable to reach the lead and finished third behind the outsiders' Mujahid and Auction House. He was reported to be unsuited by the "sloppy" ground conditions, but others felt that he had failed through lack of stamina.

=== 1999: three-year-old season ===
In the early spring of 1999, Stravinsky was again strongly fancied for the 2000 Guineas and was 5/1 favourite for the Newmarket Classic before reappearing on the racecourse. His three-year-old debut was his first and only race in his "home" country as he started odds-on favourite for a minor seven furlong race at the Curragh in March. He took the lead a furlong out but was unable to hold off the late challenge of Tarfaa (who was receiving four pounds) and was beaten a neck.

The colt missed both the 2000 Guineas and its Irish equivalent and did not reappear until the Group Three Jersey Stakes at Royal Ascot. He finished only fourth, beaten five lengths by Lots of Magic, and was seen to be racing with his head carried awkwardly to one side. After four successive defeats, Stravinsky started at 8/1 for the July Cup at Newmarket, his first race over six furlongs since his two-year-old debut. It was also the first time the colt had raced in a visor. Kinane held the colt up in the early stages before moving him up to take the lead a furlong out. He quickened clear of the field in "sensational" fashion to win by four lengths from Bold Edge in a course record time of 1:109.51. The Racing Post called his performance a "memorable display of sheer class" while pointing out that the opposition was not particularly strong for a Group One race. Aidan O'Brien blamed himself for the colt's relative lack of success saying that "we tried to stretch him and make him a miler... maybe it was me messing him up."

A month later, Stravinsky was moved down to the minimum distance of five furlongs (1000m) for the Nunthorpe Stakes at York. Before the start, he displayed the "quirky aspect" of his character by attempting to break out of the starting stalls. Once the race began the colt was settled in the middle of the field before taking up the running approaching the final furlong. He moved clear and in the words of The Independent "blew away" the opposition to win by a length and a half from the French-trained filly Sainte Marine.

On his final racecourse appearance, Stravinsky was sent to the United States for the Breeders' Cup Sprint at Gulfstream Park, although O'Brien had also considered running him in the Mile. Racing on dirt for the first time after a two-and-a-half month break, Stravinsky was prominent in the early stages but finished sixth of the fourteen runners, four lengths behind Artax.

== Assessment ==
In the official International Classification of European two-year-old for 1998, Stavinsky was given a rating of 118, five pounds below the Mujahid, making him the seventh best colt of the year.

At the 1999 Cartier Racing Awards, Stravinsky was named European Champion Sprinter.

Timeform assessed him at 120 as a two-year-old and 133 as a three-year-old. A rating of 130 is considered the mark of an above average European Group One winner.

== Stud career ==
Stravinsky had stood as a stallion for Coolmore Stud in Ireland and the United States and had also been shuttled to stand in Australia for the Southern Hemisphere breeding season. As of 2011, his bases were the Shizunai Stallion Station in Japan and the Cambridge Stud in New Zealand. His best performers in Europe have been the Group One winning sprinters Benbaun (Prix de l'Abbaye) and Soldier's Tale, while he had sired the 2005 VRC Oaks winner Serenade Rose in Australia.

Stravinsky was pensioned from stud duty in 2019 after standing at Shizunai.

== Death ==
The Japan Bloodhorse Breeders Association announced that Stravinsky died in Japan on 21 November 2023, at the age of 27.

== Pedigree ==
Pedigree of Stravinsky (USA), bay stallion, 1996
Sire Nureyev (USA) 1977	Northern Dancer; 1961	Nearctic	Nearco
Sire Nureyev (USA) 1977	Northern Dancer; 1961	Nearctic	Lady Angela
Sire Nureyev (USA) 1977	Northern Dancer; 1961	Natalma	Native Dancer*
Sire Nureyev (USA) 1977	Northern Dancer; 1961	Natalma	Almahmoud
Sire Nureyev (USA) 1977	Special; 1969	Forli	Aristophanes
Sire Nureyev (USA) 1977	Special; 1969	Forli	Trevisa
Sire Nureyev (USA) 1977	Special; 1969	Thong	Nantallah
Sire Nureyev (USA) 1977	Special; 1969	Thong	Rough Shod
Dam Fire The Groom (IRE) 1987	Blushing Groom; 1974	Red God	Nasrullah
Dam Fire The Groom (IRE) 1987	Blushing Groom; 1974	Red God	Spring Run
Dam Fire The Groom (IRE) 1987	Blushing Groom; 1974	Runaway Bride	Wild Risk
Dam Fire The Groom (IRE) 1987	Blushing Groom; 1974	Runaway Bride	Aimee
Dam Fire The Groom (IRE) 1987	Prospector's Fire; 1976	Mr. Prospector	Raise a Native
Dam Fire The Groom (IRE) 1987	Prospector's Fire; 1976	Mr. Prospector	Gold Digger
Dam Fire The Groom (IRE) 1987	Prospector's Fire; 1976	Native Street	Native Dancer*
Dam Fire The Groom (IRE) 1987	Prospector's Fire; 1976	Native Street	Beaver Street (Family: 3-d)

- Stravinsky was inbred 4 × 4 × 5 to Native Dancer. This means that the stallion appeared twice in the fourth generation of his pedigree (above) and once in the fifth generation as the sire of Raise a Native.
