= Kevin Darley =

British jockey (born 1960)

Personal information
- Born: 5 August 1960 (age 66) Penn, Wolverhampton
- Occupation: Jockey
- Website: www.kevindarley.com

Horse racing career
- Sport: Horse racing

Major racing wins
- Major British races 1,000 Guineas Stakes (2004); Princess Royal Stakes (2002); Coronation Stakes (2004); Dewhurst Stakes (2004); Golden Jubilee Stakes (2002); Haydock Sprint Cup (2000, 2006); Nunthorpe Stakes (1997 (dh), 2006); Queen Elizabeth II Stakes (2000, 2002); Racing Post Trophy (1994, 2001, 2002); St Leger (2002); Sun Chariot Stakes (1994, 1995, 2004, 2005); Yorkshire Oaks (2001)

Racing awards
- Lester Awards Flat Jockey Special Recognition Award (1997, 2007); Flat Jockey of the Year (2000); British flat racing Champion Apprentice (1978) British flat racing Champion Jockey (2000)

Significant horses
- Attraction, Bollin Eric, Brian Boru, Celtic Swing, Coastal Bluff, High Chaparral, La Confederation, Malhub, Observatory, Peeress, Pipalong, Reverence, Shamardal, Super Tassa, Warning Shadows, Where or When, Wixim

Kevin Darley (born 5 August 1960, in Penn, Wolverhampton) is an English retired jockey, and a co-president of the Jockeys' Association of Great Britain. He was British flat racing Champion Apprentice in 1978 with 70 wins and Champion Jockey in 2000 with 155 wins. He also won the Lester Award for Flat Jockey of the Year in 2000, and won the Lester Special Recognition Award in 1997 and 2007.

He was associated with a number of trainers including Mark Johnston, for whom he won the English 1,000 Guineas, Irish 1,000 Guineas, Coronation Stakes and Sun Chariot Stakes on Attraction. He also won the St Leger on Bollin Eric and French Derby on Celtic Swing.

Married with two daughters, he retired as a jockey in November 2007, after a disappointing year blighted by niggling injuries.

== Statistics ==
Flat wins in Great Britain by year, from 1988

Year	Wins	Runs	Strike rate	Total earnings
1988	38	508	7	£160,598
1989	70	581	12	£281,705
1990	83	612	14	£387,295
1991	66	576	11	£344,763
1992	91	569	16	£388,874
1993	144	829	17	£836,339
1994	154	946	16	£1,104,241
1995	148	913	16	£1,207,863
1996	113	867	13	£1,106,077
1997	128	841	15	£1,022,152
1998	94	734	13	£791,856
1999	118	855	14	£1,042,652
2000	155	997	16	£2,306,168
2001	161	984	16	£2,384,295
2002	113	800	14	£2,646,261
2003	125	871	14	£1,877,988
2004	85	822	10	£1,779,738
2005	100	723	14	£1,342,366
2006	75	604	12	£1,396,144
2007	62	530	12	£770,876

== Major wins ==
(United Kingdom) Great Britain

- 1,000 Guineas - (1) - Attraction (2004)
- Coronation Stakes - (1) - Attraction (2004)
- Dewhurst Stakes - (1) - Shamardal (2004)
- Golden Jubilee Stakes - (1) - Malhub (2002)
- Haydock Sprint Cup - (2) - Pipalong (2000), Reverence (2006)
- Nunthorpe Stakes - (2) - Coastal Bluff (1997, dead heat), Reverence (2006)
- Queen Elizabeth II Stakes - (2) - Observatory (2000), Where or When (2002)
- Racing Post Trophy - (3) - Celtic Swing (1994), High Chaparral (2001), Brian Boru (2002)
- St. Leger - (1) - Bollin Eric (2002)
- Sun Chariot Stakes - (4) - La Confederation (1994), Warning Shadows (1995), Attraction (2004), Peeress (2005)
- Yorkshire Oaks - (1) - Super Tassa (2001)

Canada

- E. P. Taylor Stakes - (1) - Fraulein (2002)

France

- Prix du Jockey Club - (1) - Celtic Swing (1995)
- Prix de l'Opéra - (1) - Kinnaird (2005)

Germany

- Aral-Pokal - (1) - River North (1994)
- Deutsches Derby - (1) - Belenus (1999)

(Republic of Ireland) Ireland

- Irish 1,000 Guineas - (1) - Attraction (2004)
- Matron Stakes - (1) - Attraction (2005)
- Moyglare Stud Stakes - (1) - Bianca Nera (1996)

Italy

- Premio Presidente della Repubblica - (1) - Flagbird (1995)
- Premio Vittorio di Capua - (1) - Port Lucaya (1994)
