= Reverence (horse) =

British-bred Thoroughbred racehorse

- Sire: Mark of Esteem
- Grandsire: Darshaan
- Dam: Imperial Bailiwick
- Sex: Gelding
- Foaled: 23 March 2001
- Country: United Kingdom
- Colour: Chestnut
- Breeder: Mr & Mrs G Middlebrook
- Owner: Mr & Mrs G Middlebrook
- Trainer: Eric Alston
- Record: 42: 10-4-3
- Earnings: £ 542,609

Major wins
- Temple Stakes (2006); Nunthorpe Stakes (2006); Haydock Sprint Cup (2006); Flying Five Stakes (2009)

Awards
- European Champion Sprinter (2006)
- Last updated on August 25, 2007

Reverence is a British champion Thoroughbred racehorse. He is a specialist sprinter who was especially effective over five furlongs (1000m), recording all but one of his wins over the distance. Most unusually for a modern thoroughbred racehorse Reverence did not appear on a racecourse until he was four years old. In a career that has lasted from May 2005 until August 2011 he ran forty-two times and won ten races. In 2006 he won two Group One races- the Nunthorpe Stakes at York and the Sprint Cup at Haydock- and was named European Champion Sprinter at the Cartier Racing Awards. Reverence ran his last race in August 2011.

== Background ==
Reverence, a chestnut gelding with a narrow white stripe, was bred by his owners, the husband-and-wife team of Gary and Lesley Middlebrook at their Wood Farm Stud near Windermere in Cumbria. Reverence was sired by Mark of Esteem an "outstanding" miler who won the 2000 Guineas and the Queen Elizabeth II Stakes in 1996. He went on to become a successful stallion, siring the Classic winners Sir Percy (Epsom Derby) and Ameerat (1000 Guineas). Reverence's dam, Imperial Bailiwick was a successful sprinter, winning the Flying Childers Stakes in 1993. In addition to Reverence, she has produced the Chesham Stakes winner Helm Bank.

Reverence was twice sent to the sales before he raced. As a yearling he was sent to the Tattersalls sale in October 2002, where he was "bought in" for 97,000gns. He was sent into training with Mark Johnston but sustained a pelvic fracture and was unable to race as a two-year-old. At three he joined the Newmarket stable of William Haggas, but a recurrence of his pelvic injury again prevented him from running. In October 2004 he was sent back to Tattersalls as an unraced three-year-old colt, but was withdrawn from the sale after failing to attract a buyer. The Middlebrooks decided to send him to the small yard of Eric Alston at Longton, Lancashire as they believed that his flat training gallops would ease the horse's recovery. Alston, a former dairy farmer later recalled that his first impression of Reverence was of "a lovely horse... he had a lovely big eye and a great attitude."

== Racing career ==
=== 2005: four-year-old season ===
Reverence made his belated debut in a maiden race at Thirsk in May, where he ran second as a 50/1 outsider. Two months later at Ripon he recorded his first win, recovering after being hampered in the early stages to win a minor five-furlong race "readily" from twelve opponents. Two weeks later he finished unplaced when favourite for a six furlong handicap at Newmarket.

For the remainder of the season, Reverence was kept to five furlongs and was unbeaten in three starts in six weeks, winning handicap races at Doncaster, Pontefract and Doncaster again by increasing margins. Although none of these races was particularly important, Reverence showed rapid improvement, with his official handicap rating rising from 73 to 95.

=== 2006: five-year-old season ===
On his five-year-old debut, Reverence was moved up to Listed class for the first time and finished third in the Cammidge Trophy at Doncaster in March. In being beaten less than a length over six furlongs Reverence's performance was rather better than it first appeared: the winner Les Arcs went on to win the Golden Jubilee Stakes and the July Cup that summer. Reverence reappeared in April to beat the veteran Bahamian Pirate in a minor stakes race on soft ground at Nottingham.

At Newmarket in May Reverence ran in his first Group Race and showed promise in finishing fourth of twenty-two runners behind Dandy Man in the Palace House Stakes. At the end of the month Reverence produced his best performance to date in the Group Two Temple Stakes at Sandown. Kevin Darley had the gelding up with the pace from the start and moved him into the lead at half way. Reverence went clear approaching the final furlong and ran on well on the soft ground to win by one and a quarter lengths from The Trader, with Les Arcs unplaced. The performance established Reverence as one of the country's leading sprinters. His next two runs, both on firm ground, were disappointing, as he finished unplaced behind Takeover Target in the King's Stand Stakes at Royal Ascot and fifth of the eight runners behind Pivotal Point in the Sprint Stakes.

His next race was the Group One Nunthorpe Stakes at York in August. With the ground now in his favour, he was strongly fancied starting 5/1 third favourite in a field of fourteen. Reverence, who "adored the ground" took the lead from the start and opened up a clear lead approaching the last furlong. Although he hung to the left in the closing stages he was never seriously challenged and won by two lengths from Amadeus Wolf. The Middlebrooks praised Alston after the win for the "time and TLC" he had given to the gelding. Alston himself praised the horse saying, "he can really quicken up, but I was amazed to see him do it like that... he's a different horse on this ground."

"Torrential rain" meant that the ground had turned even softer two weeks later, when Reverence attempted to win over six furlongs for the first time in the Betfred-sponsored Sprint Cup at his local course, Haydock Park. He raced prominently in the early stages, before Darley drove him into the lead a furlong out. He was strongly challenged in the closing stages but held on to win by a neck from Quito with Amadeus Wolf third. The Lancashire crowd gave the local horse an enthusiastic reception and Alston, winning the biggest race of his twenty-five-year career, was delighted, saying "The Nunthorpe was fantastic, but this is even better."

Reverence then attempted to win a third successive Group One win as he was sent to Longchamp for the Prix de l'Abbaye. He was always prominent but although he finished strongly he was unable to catch the front-running outsider Desert Lord and finished second, beaten a neck.

=== 2007–2011: later career ===
Reverence had little chance to build on his achievements in 2007, as training problems restricted him to just three unplaced runs. He broke a blood vessel in the Nunthorpe Stakes which ruled him out for the remainder of the season.

Although he returned for a full campaign in 2008, he was never able to recapture his best form, managing to win one minor stakes race at Haydock from twelve starts. He became a difficult horse to place, being no longer fast enough to compete with the best horses in weight-for-age races, but too highly rated to be competitive in most handicaps. In this respect, his later career resembled those of two other Northern-trained Champion sprinters Continent and Somnus

He still retained some ability however, and in 2009, at the age of eight, he recorded a final Group Race win in the Flying Five Stakes at The Curragh. He disputed the lead from the start with Judge 'n Jury before pulling ahead in the closing stages and running on "gamely" to win by a length.

On his 2010 debut, he came close to adding another important win when he returned to The Curragh for the Group Three Sapphire Stakes. Starting a 33/1 outsider he put in a strong finish and failed by half a length to catch the filly Glamorous Spirit. The run suggested that he still had "plenty to offer". Alston indicated that he would persevere with the gelding saying that "as long as he's enjoying it and running well at this level, we'll keep going with him." He was unplaced in his two remaining starts that year however, and failed to win in two more race in 2011.

== Assessment ==
At the Cartier Racing Awards in November 2006, Reverence was named European Champion Sprinter. In the 2006 World Thoroughbred Racehorse Rankings he was rated on 117, making him the third best sprinter to have raced in Europe that year, behind the Australian-trained Takeover Target (120) and Les Arcs (118).

== Pedigree ==
Pedigree of Reverence (GB), chestnut gelding, 2001
Sire Mark of Esteem (IRE) 1993	Darshaan; 1981	Shirley Heights	Mill Reef
Sire Mark of Esteem (IRE) 1993	Darshaan; 1981	Shirley Heights	Hardiemma
Sire Mark of Esteem (IRE) 1993	Darshaan; 1981	Delsy	Abdos
Sire Mark of Esteem (IRE) 1993	Darshaan; 1981	Delsy	Kelty
Sire Mark of Esteem (IRE) 1993	Homage; 1989	Ajdal	Northern Dancer*
Sire Mark of Esteem (IRE) 1993	Homage; 1989	Ajdal	Native Partner
Sire Mark of Esteem (IRE) 1993	Homage; 1989	Home Love	Vaguely Noble*
Sire Mark of Esteem (IRE) 1993	Homage; 1989	Home Love	Homespun
Dam Imperial Bailiwick (IRE) 1991	Imperial Frontier; 1984	Lyphard	Northern Dancer*
Dam Imperial Bailiwick (IRE) 1991	Imperial Frontier; 1984	Lyphard	Goofed
Dam Imperial Bailiwick (IRE) 1991	Imperial Frontier; 1984	Hartebeest	Vaguely Noble*
Dam Imperial Bailiwick (IRE) 1991	Imperial Frontier; 1984	Hartebeest	Sparkalark
Dam Imperial Bailiwick (IRE) 1991	Syndikos; 1973	Nashua	Nasrullah
Dam Imperial Bailiwick (IRE) 1991	Syndikos; 1973	Nashua	Segula
Dam Imperial Bailiwick (IRE) 1991	Syndikos; 1973	Court Action	Court Martial
Dam Imperial Bailiwick (IRE) 1991	Syndikos; 1973	Court Action	Magneto (Family: 8-c)

- Reverence is inbred 4x4 to Northern Dancer and Vaguely Noble. This means that each of these stallions appears twice in the fourth generation of his pedigree.
