= Avonbridge (horse) =

British Thoroughbred racehorse

- Sire: Averti
- Grandsire: Warning
- Dam: Alessia
- Damsire: Caerleon
- Sex: Stallion
- Foaled: 18 March 2000
- Country: United Kingdom
- Colour: Bay
- Breeder: D J Deer
- Owner: D J Deer
- Trainer: Roger Charlton
- Record: 22: 7-4-4
- Earnings: £334,587

Major wins
- Rockingham Stakes (2002); Cathedral Stakes (2003); Prix du Gros Chêne (2004); Palace House Stakes (2005); Prix de l'Abbaye (2005)

Awards
- European Champion Sprinter (2005)
- Last updated on August 25, 2007

Avonbridge is a retired British Thoroughbred racehorse and active sire. He won three Group races including the Group One Prix de l'Abbaye in a career which lasted from 2002 to 2005. In his final year he was named European Champion Sprinter at the Cartier Racing Awards. He currently stands as a stallion in Hampshire.

== Background ==
Avonbridge, a bay horse standing 16 hands high, was bred at the Fawley House Stud in Oxfordshire by his owner, John Deer. Avonbridge's sire, Averti, was a sprinter who won the King George Stakes at Goodwood in 1997. He sired the winners of over two hundred races, with Avonbridge being his most important winner. As a son of Averti, Avonbridge is a male-line descendant of the Godolphin Arabian, unlike more than 95% of modern thoroughbreds, who descend directly from the Darley Arabian. His dam, Alessia won one race as a two-year-old and became a successful broodmare, producing, in addition to Avonbridge, the Prix de l'Abbaye winner Patavellian. She was also a half sister to the Park Hill Stakes winner, Casey.

Avonbridge was sent as a weanling to the Tattersalls sales in November 2000 where was sold for 29,000gns. Although his vendor was listed as the Fawley Stud and his buyer was given as the BBA (British Bloodstock Agency), he was in fact "bought in" by his breeders, meaning that his ownership did not actually change.

Avonbridge was trained throughout his career by Roger Charlton at Beckhampton, Wiltshire and was ridden in sixteen of his twenty-two races by Steve Drowne.

== Racing career ==
=== 2002: two-year-old season ===
Avonbridge began his career by running unplaced in a twenty-runner maiden race at Windsor in August. Later in the same month he recorded his first win making almost all the running and going clear in the closing stages to win a maiden at Lingfield at odds of 20/1.

Two weeks later he carried top weight of 133 lbs in a Nursery (a handicap race for two-year-olds) at Goodwood. Ridden by Seb Sanders he tracked the leaders before taking the lead inside the final furlong to win "readily" by a length. In October Avonbridge was moved up to Listed class for the Rockingham Stakes at York. He started the 2/1 favourite and completed his hat-trick, taking the lead inside the final furlong and staying on well to beat Cumbrian Venture by half a lengths.

=== 2003: three-year-old season ===
Avonbridge was campaigned in Listed sprint races in the first half of 2003. In the Pavilion Stakes at Ascot in April he finished a length second to Striking Ambition, with the future Champion Sprinter Somnus in fifth. In May he again finished second to Striking Ambition in the Carnarvon Stakes at Newbury, although on this occasion the margin was reduced to a head. On his next start, Avonbridge recorded his only win of the season, leading all the way and running on strongly near the finish to win the Cathedral Stakes at Salisbury in June.

Avonbridge was then stepped up significantly in class as he was sent to France for the Group One Prix Maurice de Gheest over 1300m at Deauville in August. He raced prominently before being sent into the lead by Steve Drowne approaching the final 200m, he was headed in the closing stages by Porlezza but stayed on well to finish third, beaten just over a length. The performance established Avonbridge as a top class sprinter, but he was unable to win again that year despite starting favourite in his two remaining races. He finished fourth in the Prix de Meautry at the end of August and third behind Fayr Jag in the Ridgewood Pearl Stakes at the Curragh in September.

=== 2004: four-year-old season ===
Avonbridge began 2004 with a "highly-promising" run in the Palace House Stakes at Newmarket. He recovered from being blocked in the closing stages to take the lead inside the final furlong but was caught on the line and beaten a short head by the filly Frizzante. In June Avonbridge recorded his first important win in the Group Two Prix du Gros Chêne at Chantilly. Drowne sent the colt into the lead from the start and although challengers emerged he quickened "in good style" in the closing stages to beat Porlezza by half a length. Avonbridge was then sent to Royal Ascot where he started favourite for the Golden Jubilee Stakes but finished only fifth to Fayr Jag.

Avonbridge ran three times in the second half of the season, performing respectably, but failing to win. He finished fourth in the King George Stakes at Goodwood and fourth again in the Group One Nunthorpe Stakes at York after leading briefly in the closing stages. On his final start of the year he finished fifth of the fifteen starters in the Prix de l'Abbaye at Longchamp in October.

=== 2005: five-year-old season ===
Avonbridge's championship season began with another attempt at the Palace House Stakes. As usual, Avonbridge raced prominently in a race run at a "furious pace" before Drowne moved him through a gap along the rails and into the lead a furlong out. He stayed on well and won by half a length from Ashdown Express. Charlton called it "a career-best effort." Repeating his 2004 campaign, Avonbridge returned to Chantilly for the Prix du Gros Chêne, in which he finished third, beaten one and a half lengths behind The Trader and Benbaun.

Avonbridge started a 40/1 outsider for the Group One July Cup at Newmarket but ran much better than his odds suggested, going to the front at half way and leading into the final furlong. He was overtaken by Pastoral Pursuits in the closing stages but kept on well to finish second. The result was particularly unfortunate for Steve Drowne, who had been the winner's regular rider, but as Roger Charlton's stable jockey was required to partner Avonbridge. In August he ran a rare bad race when only seventh in the Nunthorpe at York.

He attempted to lead all the way in the Diadem Stakes at Newmarket in September but was caught inside the final furlong and finished third to Baron's Pit and Fayr Jag. On his final start, Avonbridge was sent to Longchamp for a second attempt at the Prix de l'Abbaye. He started slowly, and was towards the back of the field in the early stages before Drowne produced the colt with a sustained challenge in the last 400m. Avonbridge "flashed through the field" and caught his stable companion Striking Ambition in the last strides to record his biggest win by a short neck. Avonbridge's half-brother, Patavellian, also trained by Roger Charlton, finished close behind in fifth. The celebrations were delayed for fifteen minutes as the stewards inquired into possible interference between the first two but result remained unaltered. Charlton was delighted by the result saying, "I'm just thrilled for the owners, the lads in the yard – it's just great."

A week after his win in Paris, it was announced that Avonbridge would be retired to stand at the Whitsbury Manor Stud. He replaced his sire Averti who had been based at the stud before his death in December 2004.

== Assessment ==
At the Cartier Racing Awards in November 2005, Avonbridge was named European Champion Sprinter. He was not, however, highly rated enough to merit an entry in the 2005 World Thoroughbred Racehorse Rankings, an indication of the low standards among European sprinters that season. He was awarded a peak Timeform rating of 123.

== Stud career ==
Since 2006, Avonbridge has stood as a stallion at the Whitsbury Manor Stud near Fordingbridge in Hampshire, England. He made a promising start to his stud career, being one of the leading first-season sires in 2009. In his first three crops of foals he has sired the winners of well over a hundred races. His best runners to date have included Temple Meads, winner of the 2010 Mill Reef Stakes and Iver Bridge Lad who won the Prix de Seine-et-Oise in 2011. In August 2012, Avonbridge's son Blaine won the Group Two Gimcrack Stakes at York. Avonbridge currently stands at a stud fee of £3,500.

== Pedigree ==
Pedigree of Avonbridge (GB), bay stallion, 2000
Sire Averti (USA) 1991	Warning; 1985	Known Fact	In Reality
Sire Averti (USA) 1991	Warning; 1985	Known Fact	Tamerett
Sire Averti (USA) 1991	Warning; 1985	Slightly Dangerous	Roberto
Sire Averti (USA) 1991	Warning; 1985	Slightly Dangerous	Where You Lead
Sire Averti (USA) 1991	Imperial Jade; 1982	Lochnager	Dumbarnie
Sire Averti (USA) 1991	Imperial Jade; 1982	Lochnager	Miss Barbara
Sire Averti (USA) 1991	Imperial Jade; 1982	Songs Jest	Song
Sire Averti (USA) 1991	Imperial Jade; 1982	Songs Jest	Lady Jester
Dam Alessia (IRE) 1992	Caerleon; 1980	Nijinsky	Northern Dancer
Dam Alessia (IRE) 1992	Caerleon; 1980	Nijinsky	Flaming Page
Dam Alessia (IRE) 1992	Caerleon; 1980	Foreseer	Round Table
Dam Alessia (IRE) 1992	Caerleon; 1980	Foreseer	Regal Gleam
Dam Alessia (IRE) 1992	Kiss; 1978	Habitat	Sir Gaylord
Dam Alessia (IRE) 1992	Kiss; 1978	Habitat	Little Hut
Dam Alessia (IRE) 1992	Kiss; 1978	Miss Petard	Petingo
Dam Alessia (IRE) 1992	Kiss; 1978	Miss Petard	Miss Upward (Family: 1-k)
