= Frizzante (horse) =

British-bred Thoroughbred racehorse

- Sire: Efisio
- Grandsire: Formidable
- Dam: Juliet Bravo
- Damsire: Glow
- Sex: Mare
- Foaled: 21 March 1999
- Country: United Kingdom
- Colour: Bay
- Breeder: Jan Hopper and Elizabeth Grundy
- Owner: Jan Hopper and Elizabeth Grundy
- Trainer: James Fanshawe
- Record: 15:7-1-1

Major wins
- Palace House Stakes (2004); July Cup (2004)

Frizzante (foaled 21 March 1999) is a British Thoroughbred racehorse and broodmare. A specialist sprinter, she improved from running in minor handicap races to win the Group One July Cup as a five-year-old in 2004.

== Background ==
Frizzante is a bay mare bred and owned by Jan Hopper and Elizabeth Grundy and trained by Newmarket based James Fanshawe. She is a full-sister of the Listed race winner Firenze and half-sister of 2007 Stewards' Cup winner Zidane.

== Racing career ==
Frizzante won one minor race at Doncaster Racecourse from three starts as a three-year-old in 2002. In the following year she showed steady improvement, winning three handicaps and a Listed race from six starts.

Frizzante reached her peak as a five-year-old in 2004. In May she defeated Avonbridge in the Palace House Stakes at Newmarket Racecourse to record her first win at Group race level. After finishing third to The Tatling in the King's Stand Stakes at Royal Ascot she returned to Newmarket for the Group One July Cup. She took the lead inside the final furlong to win by a neck from Ashdown Express, with the other beaten horses including Somnus, Cape of Good Hope, Continent and Exceed and Excel. Frizzante failed to reproduce her best form in two subsequent races, finishing unplaced in the Prix Maurice de Gheest and the Sprint Cup before being retired at the end of the season.
