= Cartier Champion Sprinter =

Award in European horse racing

The Cartier Champion Sprinter is an award in European horse racing, founded in 1991, and sponsored by Cartier SA as part of the Cartier Racing Awards. The award winner is decided by points earned in group races plus the votes cast by British racing journalists and readers of the Racing Post and The Daily Telegraph newspapers.

== Records ==
Most successful horse (2 wins):

- Lochsong – 1993, 1994

Leading sires (3 winners each):

- Green Desert – Sheikh Albadou (1991), Tamarisk (1998), Oasis Dream (2003)
- Dark Angel – Lethal Force (2013), Harry Angel (2017), Battaash (2020)

Leading trainer (3 wins):

- Aidan O'Brien – Stravinsky (1999), Mozart (2001), Starspangledbanner (2010)

Leading owner (3 wins):

- Sue Magnier – Stravinsky (1999), Mozart (2001), Starspangledbanner (2010)

=== Winners ===
Year	Horse	Age	Gender	Bred	Trained	Trainer	Owner
1991	Sheikh Albadou	3	C	GB	GB	Alex Scott	Hilal Salem
1992	Mr Brooks	5	H	GB	GB	Richard Hannon, Sr.	Paul Green
1993	Lochsong	5	M	GB	GB	Ian Balding	Jeff Smith
1994	Lochsong	6	M	GB	GB	Ian Balding	Jeff Smith
1995	Hever Golf Rose	4	F	GB	GB	Joe Naughton	M P Hanson
1996	Anabaa	4	C	USA	FR	Criquette Head	Ghislaine Head
1997	Royal Applause	4	C	GB	GB	Barry Hills	Maktoum Al Maktoum
1998	Tamarisk	3	C	IRE	GB	Roger Charlton	Highclere Racing
1999	Stravinsky	3	C	USA	IRE	Aidan O'Brien	Sue Magnier and Michael Tabor
2000	Nuclear Debate	5	G	USA	FR	John Hammond	Bob Chester
2001	Mozart	3	C	IRE	IRE	Aidan O'Brien	Sue Magnier and Michael Tabor
2002	Continent	5	G	GB	GB	David Nicholls	Lucayan Stud
2003	Oasis Dream	3	C	GB	GB	John Gosden	Khalid Abdullah
2004	Somnus	4	G	GB	GB	Tim Easterby	Lady Legard
2005	Avonbridge	5	H	GB	GB	Roger Charlton	D J Deer
2006	Reverence	5	G	GB	GB	Roger Alston	Mr & Mrs G Middlebrook
2007	Red Clubs	4	C	IRE	GB	Barry Hills	Ronald J Arculli
2008	Marchand d'Or	5	G	FR	FR	Mikel Delzangles	Carla Giral
2009	Fleeting Spirit	4	F	IRE	GB	Jeremy Noseda	The Searchers
2010	Starspangledbanner	4	C	AUS	IRE	Aidan O'Brien	Smith, Magnier, Tabor and Massey
2011	Dream Ahead	3	C	USA	GB	David Simcock	Khalifa Dasmal
2012	Black Caviar	6	M	AUS	AUS	Peter Moody	G Wilkie, K Wilkie et al
2013	Lethal Force	4	C	IRE	GB	Clive Cox	Alan Craddock
2014	Sole Power	7	G	GB	IRE	Edward Lynam	Sabena Power
2015	Muhaarar	3	C	GB	GB	Charlie Hills	Hamdan Al Maktoum
2016	Quiet Reflection	3	F	GB	GB	Karl Burke	Ontoawinner Syndicate
2017	Harry Angel	3	C	IRE	GB	Clive Cox	Godolphin
2018	Mabs Cross	4	F	GB	GB	Michael Dods	David W Armstrong
2019	Blue Point	5	C	IRE	GB	Charlie Appleby	Godolphin
2020	Battaash	6	G	IRE	GB	Charles Hills	Hamdan Al Maktoum
2021	Starman	4	C	GB	GB	Ed Walker	David Ward
2022	Highfield Princess	5	M	FR	GB	John Quinn	Trainers House Enterprises Ltd
2023	Shaquille	3	C	GB	GB	Julie Camacho	Hughes, Rawlings, O'Shaughnessy
2024	Bradsell	4	C	GB	GB	Archie Watson	Victorious Racing
2025	Asfoora	7	M	AUS	AUS	Henry Dwyer	Noor Elaine Farm Pty Ltd
2026	Almeraq	4	C	GB	GB	William Haggas	Shadwell Estate Company Limited
