= Continent (horse) =

British-bred Thoroughbred racehorse

- Sire: Lake Coniston
- Grandsire: Bluebird
- Dam: Krisia
- Damsire: Kris
- Sex: Gelding
- Foaled: 8 April 1997
- Country: United Kingdom
- Colour: Chestnut
- Breeder: Juddmonte Farms
- Owner: Khalid Abdullah; Lucayan Stud
- Trainer: Pascal Bary; David Nicholls.
- Record: 70: 7-6-7
- Earnings: £ 426,461

Major wins
- Ayr Gold Cup (2001); July Cup (2002); Prix de l'Abbaye (2002)

Awards
- European Champion Sprinter (2002)
- Last updated on August 25, 2007

Continent is a retired British champion Thoroughbred racehorse. A gelding who specialised in sprint distances, he improved from handicap class to become European Champion Sprinter in 2002. In his championship season he ran thirteen times and won two Group One races; the July Cup at Newmarket and the Prix de l'Abbaye at Longchamp, becoming the first gelding to win the latter race. In all, he ran seventy times in a career which lasted from 1999 until his retirement at the age of eleven in 2008.

== Background ==
Continent, a chestnut gelding with a narrow white stripe, was bred by his first owner Khalid Abdullah's Juddmonte Farm. He was one of the first crop of foals sired by Lake Coniston, a top class sprinter who won the July Cup in 1995. Apart from Continent, Lake Coniston made little impact as a sire in Europe, and was exported to South Africa where he died in 2014. Continent's dam Krisia, was a daughter of the Prix Maurice de Gheest winner Interval and a half sister to several winners.

Continent was originally trained in France by Pascal Bary for Khalid Abdulla. At the end of his three-year-old season he was sent to the Tattersalls October sales where he was bought for 40,000gns by McKeever St Lawrence a Newmarket-based bloodstock agency and entered the ownership of Edward St George's Lucayan Stud. He was then sent to the North Yorkshire stable of David Nicholls.

== Racing career ==
=== 1999–2001: early career ===
Continent began his career by running third in the Prix de Caen at Deauville in October 1999. On his three-year-old debut he "easily" won an 1100m race at Chantilly by four lengths. He was immediately moved up to Group Two class, but finished last of the five runners behind Nuclear Debate in the Prix du Gros Chêne. After being well beaten in two minor races he was regarded as surplus to requirements and sent to the sales.

As noted above, he began 2001 in the care of David Nicholls. The Nicholls stable specialises in sprinters and has sent out the winners of most of the top European races over five and six furlongs, including the Nunthorpe Stakes, the Prix Maurice de Gheest, the Haydock Sprint Cup, the July Cup, the Prix de l'Abbaye, the Stewards' Cup and the Ayr Gold Cup.

Continent failed to win in his first five starts for his new stable, his closest effort being when third in a minor handicap race at Pontefract. He looked to be unlucky in running in the Stewards' Cup at Goodwood however, and his lack of success meant that his official handicap mark had fallen to 92 by the time of the valuable Ayr Gold Cup in late September. Ridden by Darryll Holland he started slowly and was held up in the early running as the field of twenty-eight runners split into two groups. In the second half of the race he made good progress to lead the stands-side group and stayed on strongly to win by a head from Brevity. It was Nicholls second successive win in the race, having won the race in 2000 with Bahamian Pirate. On his final start of the year he put up an even better performance when carrying 133lbs into third place in a handicap at Ascot.

His last two runs saw Continent's handicap mark rise to 100. This meant that he would be forced to carry top weight in almost any handicap race, and as a result the focus of his career shifted to weight-for-age competition.

=== 2002: five-year-old season ===
After a final, unsuccessful run in a handicap, Continent ran second to Reel Buddy in both the Quail Stakes and the Listed Abernant Stakes. A move into Group Class was not an immediate success as he ran unplaced in the Palace House Stakes, the Duke of York Stakes and the Temple Stakes.

At Royal Ascot in June, Continent gave the first real indication that he could be a top class sprinter. On the Tuesday of the meeting he started a 16/1 outsider for the King's Stand Stakes but belied his odds by finishing strongly after a poor start and failing by only a head to catch Dominica. On the Saturday of the meeting he was only fifth to Malhub in the Golden Jubilee Stakes, but finished ahead of notable performers such as Invincible Spirit and Johannesburg.

In the Group One July Cup, which was run in "diabolical weather" at Newmarket, Continent started at 12/1 in a field of 14 which included Reel Buddy and Malhub. He was held up by Holland before slipping through a gap to take the lead in the final furlong. He hung to the right in the closing stages but ran on well to beat his stable companion, Bahamian Pirate by half a length. After the race Edward St George paid tribute to Nicholls handling of horses saying, "He understands them. He talks to them. He will take half-witted horses that other trainers throw out and turn them into serious racehorses." In August Continent finished fourth, beaten just over a length in the Group One Nunthorpe Stakes at York, and then ran sixth to Invincible Spirit in the Haydock Sprint Cup.

In October, Continent faced a field of twenty in the Prix de L'Abbaye and was made 4/1 joint favourite with Bahamian Pirate. Holland tracked the leaders before producing Continent with a strong run in the final furlong. The gelding ran on strongly under pressure to take the lead on the line and win a three way photo finish from the Italian runner Slap Shot and the French-trained Zipping with Bahamian Pirate a neck behind in fourth. After the race Slap Shot's jockey Mirco Demuro was so convinced that he had won that he rode his horse into the winner's enclosure and celebrated with a Frankie Dettori-style flying dismount. The stewards examined the photograph for fifteen minutes before declaring Continent the winner. Nicholls was as surprised as anyone; "I'm gobsmacked... I need a drink". Continent was the first gelding to win the Prix de l'Abbaye, the race having been restricted to "entire" colts and fillies until 2001. On his final race of the year Continent was sent to Sha Tin Racecourse for the Hong Kong Sprint but made no impression, finishing last of the fourteen runners.

=== 2003–2008: later career ===
Continent continued to be campaigned at the highest level in 2003, but was unable to recapture his form and finished unplaced in all five of his races, his best effort coming when running sixth to Oasis Dream in the July Cup.

Continent became a difficult horse to place in his later career. He was no longer capable of winning at the top level, but his outstanding performances in 2002 led to his being given big weights when he moved down into handicap class. In 2004 he ran seven times, finishing third in the Ayr Gold Cup, and winning a minor stakes race at Nottingham in August. It was to be almost three years and twenty-eight races before he won again.

He failed to win in 2005 or 2006 and four more defeats in 2007 saw his handicap rating fall to a new low of 82. In June at Thirsk, his local track, the ten-year-old finally broke his losing streak when he finished strongly to take the lead close home and win a minor handicap race by half a length. Six weeks and four races later he won for the second time that year when he stayed on well to take a handicap at Goodwood.

After five more races Continent was retired after running unplaced at York in June 2008.

== Assessment ==
At the 2002 Cartier Racing Awards, Continent was named European Champion Sprinter. In the official International Classification for 2002, Continent was rated at 117, making him the third best European sprinter, behind Kyllachy and Invincible Spirit.

== Pedigree ==
Pedigree of Continent (GB), chestnut gelding, 1997
Sire Lake Coniston (IRE) 1991	Bluebird; 1984	Storm Bird	Northern Dancer
Sire Lake Coniston (IRE) 1991	Bluebird; 1984	Storm Bird	South Ocean
Sire Lake Coniston (IRE) 1991	Bluebird; 1984	Ivory Dawn	Sir Ivor
Sire Lake Coniston (IRE) 1991	Bluebird; 1984	Ivory Dawn	Dusky Evening
Sire Lake Coniston (IRE) 1991	Persian Polly; 1980	Persian Bold	Bold Lad
Sire Lake Coniston (IRE) 1991	Persian Polly; 1980	Persian Bold	Relkarunner
Sire Lake Coniston (IRE) 1991	Persian Polly; 1980	Polyester Girl	Ridan
Sire Lake Coniston (IRE) 1991	Persian Polly; 1980	Polyester Girl	Garrucha
Dam Krisia (GB) 1992	Kris; 1976	Sharpen Up	Atan
Dam Krisia (GB) 1992	Kris; 1976	Sharpen Up	Rocchetta
Dam Krisia (GB) 1992	Kris; 1976	Doubly Sure	Reliance
Dam Krisia (GB) 1992	Kris; 1976	Doubly Sure	Soft Angels
Dam Krisia (GB) 1992	Interval; 1984	Habitat	Sir Gaylord
Dam Krisia (GB) 1992	Interval; 1984	Habitat	Little Hut
Dam Krisia (GB) 1992	Interval; 1984	Intermission	Stage Door Johnny
Dam Krisia (GB) 1992	Interval; 1984	Intermission	Peace(Family: 1-p)
