= Racing Post =

British daily sports betting newspaper

- Type: Publisher
- Owner: Exponent Private Equity
- Founder: Mohammed Bin Rashid Al Maktoum
- Founded: April 1986
- Language: English
- Headquarters: London, England, United Kingdom
- ISSN: 0968-3364
- Website: www.racingpost.com

Racing Post is a British daily horse racing, greyhound racing, and sports betting publisher published in print and digital formats. It is printed in tabloid format from Monday to Sunday. As of December 2008, it has an average daily circulation of 60,629 copies.

== History ==
Launched on 15 April 1986, the Racing Post is a daily national print and digital publisher specializing in the British horse racing industry, horse racing, greyhound racing, and sports betting. The paper was founded by UAE (United Arab Emirates) Prime Minister and Sheikh of Dubai Sheikh Mohammed bin Rashid Al Maktoum, a racehorse owner, and edited by Graham Rock, who was replaced by Michael Harris in 1988. In 1998, Sheikh Mohammed sold the license for the paper to Trinity Mirror, owners of The Sporting Life (which subsequently was closed), for £1, although Sheikh Mohammed still retains ownership of the paper's name, and Trinity Mirror donated £10 million to four horse racing charities as a condition of the transfer.

In 2007, Trinity Mirror sold the paper for £170m to FL Partners, who appointed former editor Alan Byrne as editor-in-chief and chief executive. The paper launched its website, racingpost.co.uk, in 1997. After the paper's sale to FL Partners, the site was relaunched as racingpost.com in 2008. The business was sold to Exponent Private Equity in September 2016, with Richard Segal appointed chairman.

Alan Byrne edited the paper from 1993 to 2002. He was succeeded by Chris Smith, who was then replaced by Bruce Millington in 2007. Millington was the editor between 2007 and 2018. In December 2018, Tom Kerr was named as the new editor of the Racing Post and Group Racing Director, replacing Bruce Millington. The former horserace writer of the year previously worked as a senior writer for Racing Post and had been with the business for nine years.

Racing Post employs approximately 300 permanent staff and expanded in 2018 by acquiring a majority stake in the leading sports betting website and app business, Apsley, as well as the acquisition of Leeds-based ICS Media Group, a content provider and digital marketing agency.

In March 2020, the Racing Post announced it would suspend publication of its print edition in response to the halting of British and Irish horseracing because of the coronavirus pandemic (COVID-19). Printing of the publication returned in June 2020.

== Content and features ==
The Racing Post newspaper blends breaking news in the horse racing and betting industries with tipping content, race previews, and reports, along with columns and features. In addition to daily editorials, the newspaper includes cards and forms for each day's racing as well as entries and results. The greyhound section previews upcoming racing in addition to offering cards, form, and results, and the sports section offers tipping across an extensive range of sports worldwide, as well as specials like politics or TV competitions and reality shows.

The mobile app (IOS and Android) includes cards, forms, results, and expert tips.

RacingPost.com features both free and premium (paid-for) content. Sections include news, cards, results, tipping, bloodstock, sports, race day live, statistics, and shop. Race replays (access to a UK and Irish racing archive) and a digital newspaper are available to subscribers.

== Accolades ==
Racing Post was highly commended for the Grand Prix award at the Newsawards 2016. The judges commented: "This was a tremendous example of adapting the business model in an increasingly online world. The Racing Post's multi-platform offering of print, app and pocket guides was evidence that the Racing Post had grabbed the digital revenue streams by the horns and made a huge success through diversifying. It has used its spin-off products and partnerships to extend its reach".

Alastair Down won the specialist writer category at the Sports Journalists' Association (SJA) Awards in 2016. Edward Whitaker has won the SJA Sports Photographer of the Year on two occasions, in 2008 and 2011. Steve Palmer has won the SJA Sports Betting Writer of the Year on two occasions, in 2008 and 2009.

The late Queen Elizabeth II, a keen equestrian and breeder of thoroughbred racehorses, was said to have read the Racing Post every morning at breakfast, mostly to track the performance of her bloodstock.
