= Swan Princess (horse) =

British-bred Thoroughbred racehorse

- Sire: So Blessed
- Grandsire: Princely Gift
- Dam: Swan Ann
- Damsire: My Swanee
- Sex: Mare
- Foaled: 8 March 1978
- Died: 1999 (aged 20–21)
- Country: United Kingdom
- Colour: Brown
- Breeder: A. R. Jones Morgan
- Trainer: Brian Swift
- Record: 13: 4-3-2

Major wins
- Phoenix Stakes (1980)

Awards
- Timeform rating 106 (1980), 94 (1981)

Honours
- Top-rated 2-y-o Filly in Ireland (1980)

Swan Princess (8 March 1978 – 1999) was a British Thoroughbred racehorse and broodmare. As a two-year-old in 1980 she showed exceptional speed but was also temperamental and difficult to restrain. She won two minor races and finished second in both the National Stakes and the Molecomb Stakes before recording her biggest win in the Phoenix Stakes. She won one minor race from four attempts ain 1981 before being retired from racing. As a broodmare she produced several minor winners.

== Background ==
Swan Princess was a "headstrong" brown mare with a small white star bred in the United Kingdom by A R Jones Morgan. As a yearling she was put up for auction and sold for 13,000 guineas. She was sent into training with Brian Swift at Loretta Lodge, Epsom

She was sired by So Blessed, a sprinter who won the July Cup and the Nunthorpe Stakes as a three-year-old in 1968. HisHe stood as a breeding stallion in Europe where his other offspring included Duboff (Sun Chariot Stakes) and Honeyblest (Diadem Stakes), before being exported to Japan. Swan Princess's dam Swan Ann showed modest racing ability, winning one race in twelve attempts but was much more successful as a broodmare with her other foals including Primo Dominie who won the Richmond Stakes and sired both First Trump and Primo Valentino.

== Racing career ==
=== 1980: two-year-old season ===
As a two-year-old Swan Princess was campaigned exclusively over the minimum distance of five furlongs. On her debut in March she won a fifteen-runner maiden race at Doncaster Racecourse in March by a wide margin despite veering across the track in the closing stages. At Newmarket in the following month she pulled very hard on the way to the start and then ran poorly to finish third. In May at Folkestone she was better behaved and ran out a very easy winner of the Metropole Challenge Cup. Her temperamental problems returned at Epsom later that month when she was withdrawn at the start after bolting, colliding with the running rails and injuring her jockey Lester Piggott. For the rest of the season she was taken down the start very slowly and separately from the other runners.

In June at Royal Ascot she was moved up in class for the Windsor Castle Stakes and finished fourth to the Irish colt Cooliney Prince after leading until inside the final furlong. In the National Stakes she again led for most of the way being overtaken close to home and finished second to Penmarric. At Goodwood Racecourse she was matched against the season's leading two-year-old filly Marwell as well as the Queen Mary Stakes winner Pushy in the Molecomb Stakes. She showed her customary early speed to take the early lead and although she was no match for Marwell in the last furlong she kept on well to take second, four lengths clear of Pushy. In August she was sent to Phoenix Park Racecourse in Ireland for the Phoenix Stakes, a race which had been elevated to Group 1 level in the previous year. Ridden by the Welsh jockey Taffy Thomas she went to the front as usual and opened up a clear lead over her opponents. She was strongly pressed in the closing stages by the favourite Band Practice (a colt from the Dermot Weld stable) but stayed on well to win by a head. Later that month she was matched against older horses in William Hill Sprint Championship at York in which she finished sixth behind Sharpo.

At the end of the year Swan Princess was rated the best two-year-old filly to race in Ireland on the Irish Free Handicap. The independent Timeform organisation gave her a rating of 106, making her eighteen-pound inferior to their best juvenile filly Marwell. In their annual Racehorses of 1980 Timeform described her as "an exceptionally speedy filly" with "tremendous nevous energy" but opined that her owners had wasted their money by entering her in the 1000 Guineas as she had no chance of staying beyond five furlongs.

=== 1981: three-year-old season ===
Swan Princess began her second season in a minor race over six furlongs at Folkestone in April and won by one and a half lengths from Silex. She finished unplaced in her next two races before finishing third in her final racecourse appearance.

== Breeding record ==
After her retirement from racing Swan Princess became a broodmare. She produced four winners but no top-class performers. Her known foals included:

- Princess Adraan, a bay filly, foaled in 1983, sired by Adraan. Failed to win in Australia.
- Lord of Biscay, bay colt, 1984, by Biscay. Bred in Australia.
- Tristram Princess, chestnut filly, 1986, by Sir Tristram. Unraced
- Omen Victory, bay colt, 1988, by Alydar. Failed to win in five races.
- Washington Warrior, brown colt, 1989, by Seattle Slew. Unraced.
- Romantic Offer, bay filly, 1990, by Hours After.
- Swan Aly, chestnut filly, 1991, by Alydar.
- My Princess, chestnut filly, 1993, by Seattle Dancer. Won one race.
- Woody Green, bay colt, 1994, by Woodman. Won two races in Japan.
- Saint Ann, bay filly, 1995, by Geiger Counter. Failed to win in four races.
- Megajoule, bay colt, 1996, by Dehere. Won three races in Japan.
- Lord Cygnus, colt, 1997, by El Gran Senor. Won three races in Japan.
- Prince Rhythm, bay colt, 1998, by Rhythm. Unplaced in only race.

== Pedigree ==
Pedigree of Swan Princess (GB), brown mare, 1978
Sire So Blessed (GB) 1965	Princely Gift (GB); 1951	Nasrullah	Nearco
Sire So Blessed (GB) 1965	Princely Gift (GB); 1951	Nasrullah	Mumtaz Begum
Sire So Blessed (GB) 1965	Princely Gift (GB); 1951	Blue Gem	Blue Peter
Sire So Blessed (GB) 1965	Princely Gift (GB); 1951	Blue Gem	Sparkle
Sire So Blessed (GB) 1965	Lavant (GB); 1955	Le Lavandou	Djebel
Sire So Blessed (GB) 1965	Lavant (GB); 1955	Le Lavandou	Lavande
Sire So Blessed (GB) 1965	Lavant (GB); 1955	Firle	Noble Star
Sire So Blessed (GB) 1965	Lavant (GB); 1955	Firle	Versicle
Dam Swan Ann (GB) 1971	My Swanee (GB); 1963	Petition	Fair Trial
Dam Swan Ann (GB) 1971	My Swanee (GB); 1963	Petition	Art Paper
Dam Swan Ann (GB) 1971	My Swanee (GB); 1963	Grey Rhythm	Grey Sovereign
Dam Swan Ann (GB) 1971	My Swanee (GB); 1963	Grey Rhythm	Metronome
Dam Swan Ann (GB) 1971	Anna Barry (GB); 1964	Falls of Clyde	Fair Trial
Dam Swan Ann (GB) 1971	Anna Barry (GB); 1964	Falls of Clyde	Hyndford Bridge
Dam Swan Ann (GB) 1971	Anna Barry (GB); 1964	Anagram	Vilmoray
Dam Swan Ann (GB) 1971	Anna Barry (GB); 1964	Anagram	Matigram (Family:9-e)

- Through her dam, Swan Princess was inbred 4 × 4 to Fair Trial, meaning that this stallion appears twice in the fourth generation of her pedigree.
