= Primo Valentino =

Irish-bred Thoroughbred racehorse

- Sire: Primo Dominie
- Grandsire: Dominion
- Dam: Dorothea Brooke
- Damsire: Dancing Brave
- Sex: Stallion
- Foaled: 14 February 1997
- Country: Ireland
- Colour: Bay
- Breeder: Pendley Farm
- Owner: Primo Donnas
- Trainer: Peter Harris
- Record: 14: 6-1-0
- Earnings: £147,283

Major wins
- Sirenia Stakes (1999); Mill Reef Stakes (1999); Middle Park Stakes (1999); Abernant Stakes (2001)

Primo Valentino (foaled 14 February 1997) was an Irish-bred, British-trained Thoroughbred racehorse and sire. A specialist sprinter, he showed his best form as a two-year-old in 1999 when he won his last five races including the Sirenia Stakes, Mill Reef Stakes and Middle Park Stakes. He recorded his only subsequent victory in 2001 when he won the Abernant Stakes. He made little impact as a breeding stallion.

== Background ==
Primo Valentino was a small "chunky" bay horse foaled on Valentine's Day 1997. He was bred in Ireland by Pendley Farm, the breeding organisation of his owner and trainer Peter Harris. He was sired by Primo Dominie, a high-class two-year-old and sprinter who won four Group races in 1984 and 1985 before going on to sire over six hundred winners during his stud career. Apart from Primo Valentino, his best offspring were First Trump and the Premio Roma winner Imperial Dancer. Primo Valentino's dam Dorothea Brooke won one of her ten races and became a successful broodmare who produced the Cherry Hinton Stakes winner Dora Carrington. She was a daughter of Connaught Bridge whose wins included the Nassau Stakes and the Yorkshire Oaks in 1979 and who was, in turn, a descendant of the broodmare Rustic Bridge, the female-line ancestor of Cantelo and Yeats.

Harris owned the colt in a partnership known as the Primo Donnas and trained him at his stable at Ringshall in Buckinghamshire.

== Racing career ==
=== 1999: two-year-old season ===
Primo Valentino was ridden in his first three starts by Pat Eddery. He made his racecourse debut in a race over five furlongs at Windsor Racecourse on 17 May in which he started the 5/4 favourite and finished second, beaten one and a quarter lengths by Barringer. Two weeks later the colt was stepped up in class for the Listed National Stakes at Sandown Park Racecourse and finished fourth of the seven runners behind the Mick Channon-trained Rowaasi. He was then dropped back in class for a maiden race on 12 June at Leicester Racecourse and recorded his first success, leading from the start and winning easily by six lengths from Breathless Dreams. Jimmy Fortune took over from Eddery when the colt started 4/7 favourite for a minor race at Goodwood two weeks later and won by two lengths from Halland Park Girl.

After a break of two and a half months, Primo Valentino returned in the Listed Sirenia Stakes over six furlongs at Kempton Park on 8 September. Ridden by Michael Roberts he started the 15/8 favourite against five opponents including the fillies Kashra and Seazun and the colt Ginola's Magic (third in the Richmond Stakes). After tracking the leaders, Primo Valentino took the lead a furlong out and won "cleverly" by half a length from Seazun with a gap of three and a half lengths back to Imperialist and third. Ten days later the colt started 6/5 favourite for the Group Two Mill Reef Stakes at Newbury with his three opponents being Observatory, Ma Yoram (runner-up in the Gimcrack Stakes) and the Barry Hills-trained Trouble Mountain. Before the race, a spokesman for the stable said "He has done very little wrong. We thought he was a good horse right from the beginning and he must have a serious chance". Primo Valentino led from the start, accelerated a furlong out and won "readily" by one and a quarter lengths from Trouble Mountain.

Primo Valentino was reunited with Eddery when the colt contested the Group One Middle Park Stakes at Newmarket on 30 September and started 100/30 second favourite behind Invincible Spirit. The other runners were Warm Heart (Norfolk Stakes), Brahms (runner-up in the Futurity Stakes) and the maiden race winners Fath and Trinculo. Eddery sent Primo Valentino into the lead from the start, with Fath and Brahms being his closest pursuers. The order remained the same throughout, with Primo Valentino running on "gamely" in the final furlong to win by a neck from Fath, with Brahms just over a length away in third.

=== 2000: three-year-old season ===
On his three-year-old debut Primo Valentino was tested over one mile for the first and only time when he contested the 2000 Guineas at Newmarket on 6 May. Starting a 16/1 outsider he showed "terrific speed" to lead the field until tiring a furlong from the finish and finished seventh of the twenty-seven runners behind King's Best. The colt returned to sprint distances four weeks later when he was sent to Germany for the Group Three Bénazet-Rennen over 1200 metres but despite starting the odds-on favourite he again faded in the closing stages after setting the early pace and finished sixth. The Racing Post described his performance as "desperately disappointing". Primo Valentino's best performance of 2000 came when he faced an international weight-for-age field in the July Cup at Newmarket. He led the field and stayed on after being overtaken a furlong out to finish fourth behind Agnes World, Lincoln Dancer and Pipalong. On his final appearance of the year he was sent to France for the Prix de l'Abbaye over 1000 metres at Longchamp Racecourse and finished ninth behind the Irish colt Namid.

=== 2001: four-year-old season ===
Primo Valentino was expected to be retired at the end of the year, but plans were changed: a stable spokesman said "his two worst runs last season were both abroad, so the thinking now is that he might not be a good traveller".

He made his first appearance as a four-year-old in the Listed Abernant Stakes at Newmarket in April and started the 9/1 third choice in a twenty-three runners field. Under what was described as a "perfectly judged" ride from Richard Quinn he went to the front from the start and was never seriously challenged, winning by one and a quarter lengths from Fath. The colt failed to build on his promising start in his two subsequent races, finishing at the rear of the field in both the Cork and Orrery Stakes and the July Cup.

== Stud record ==
Primo Valentino was retired from racing to become a breeding stallion. He was based at the Bearstone Stud before moving to the Yorton Farm Stud in Shropshire in 2007. He struggled to attract high-class mares and was exported to Iran in 2011. The most successful of his offspring has been Clever Cookie, a gelding whose wins have included the Premier Kelso Hurdle, Ormonde Stakes and the Yorkshire Cup.

== Pedigree ==
Pedigree of Primo Valentino (IRE), bay stallion, 1997
Sire Primo Dominie (GB) 1982	Dominion (GB); 1972	Derring-Do	Darius
Sire Primo Dominie (GB) 1982	Dominion (GB); 1972	Derring-Do	Sipsey Bridge
Sire Primo Dominie (GB) 1982	Dominion (GB); 1972	Picture Palace	Princely Gift
Sire Primo Dominie (GB) 1982	Dominion (GB); 1972	Picture Palace	Palais Glide
Sire Primo Dominie (GB) 1982	Swan Ann (GB); 1971	My Swanee	Petition
Sire Primo Dominie (GB) 1982	Swan Ann (GB); 1971	My Swanee	Grey Rhythm
Sire Primo Dominie (GB) 1982	Swan Ann (GB); 1971	Anna Barry	Falls of Clyde
Sire Primo Dominie (GB) 1982	Swan Ann (GB); 1971	Anna Barry	Anagram
Dam Dorothea Brooke (IRE) 1992	Dancing Brave (USA); 1983	Lyphard	Northern Dancer
Dam Dorothea Brooke (IRE) 1992	Dancing Brave (USA); 1983	Lyphard	Goofed
Dam Dorothea Brooke (IRE) 1992	Dancing Brave (USA); 1983	Navajo Princess	Drone
Dam Dorothea Brooke (IRE) 1992	Dancing Brave (USA); 1983	Navajo Princess	Olmec
Dam Dorothea Brooke (IRE) 1992	Connaught Bridge (IRE); 1976	Connaught	St Paddy
Dam Dorothea Brooke (IRE) 1992	Connaught Bridge (IRE); 1976	Connaught	Nagaika
Dam Dorothea Brooke (IRE) 1992	Connaught Bridge (IRE); 1976	Fisherman's Bridge	Crepello
Dam Dorothea Brooke (IRE) 1992	Connaught Bridge (IRE); 1976	Fisherman's Bridge	Riva (Family: 1-m)
