= Crimplene (horse) =

Irish-bred Thoroughbred racehorse

- Racing silks of Marwan Al-Maktoum
- Sire: Lion Cavern
- Grandsire: Mr. Prospector
- Dam: Crimson Conquest
- Damsire: Diesis
- Sex: Mare
- Foaled: 11 January 1997
- Country: Ireland
- Colour: Chestnut
- Breeder: Marwan Al-Maktoum
- Owner: Marwan Al-Maktoum
- Trainer: Clive Brittain
- Record: 16:6-1-4
- Earnings: £511,397

Major wins
- German 1000 Guineas (2000); Irish 1,000 Guineas (2000); Coronation Stakes (2000); Nassau Stakes (2000)

Crimplene (11 January 1997 – 2005) was an Irish-bred, British-trained Thoroughbred racehorse and broodmare. In a racing career which lasted from May 1999 until November 2000 she competed in seven countries and won six of her sixteen races. In the summer of 2000 she produced her best form, winning the German 1000 Guineas, Irish 1,000 Guineas, Coronation Stakes and Nassau Stakes. She was retired to stud at the end of the year and died in 2005 at the age of eight.

== Background ==
Crimplene was a dark-coated chestnut filly with a white blaze bred in Ireland by her owner Marwan Al-Maktoum. She was one of the best horses sired by Lion Cavern, an American-bred stallion who won the Horris Hill Stakes and the Greenham Stakes when trained in France. Apart from Crimplene, the best of his offspring was the Australian sprinter Apache Cat. Crimplene's dam, Crimson Conquest, who won one minor race as a two-year-old, was descended from Bayrose, ancestor of the Poule d'Essai des Poulains winners Blue Tom and Fast Topaze.

The filly was sent into training with Clive Brittain at his Carlburg stables at Newmarket, Suffolk and was ridden in most of her races by Philip Robinson.

== Racing career ==
=== 1999: two-year-old season ===
Crimplene began her racing career by finishing second in a maiden race at Pontefract Racecourse on 18 May and then recorded her first success when taking a similar event at Redcar two weeks later. At the end of June, the filly was moved up to Listed class to finish third in the Empress Stakes over six furlongs at Newmarket. Despite her defeat, she was stepped up in class again in August, when she was sent to York Racecourse for the Lowther Stakes. Starting a 40/1 outsider, she pulled hard in the early stages before weakening to finish seventh of the nine runners behind the locally trained Jemima. Crimplene was then dropped in class for a minor stakes race at Salisbury Racecourse and won by a head from Forever Midnight. For her final start of the year, Crimplene was moved into the highest class when she contested the Group One Cheveley Park Stakes. Ridden by Frankie Dettori she again pulled hard in the early stages but finished strongly to finish third behind Seazun and Torgau. At the end of the season, representatives of Sheikh Mohammed's Godolphin organisation purchased Brittain's Teggiano, the winner of the Fillies' Mile, but showed no interest in Crimplene.

=== 2000: three-year-old season ===
==== Spring ====
In March, Crimplene was sent to the United Arab Emirates and was matched against colts in the UAE Derby on dirt at Nad Al Sheba Racecourse. She turned into the straight in third place but faded in the closing stages to finish sixth of the sixteen runners behind China Visit. On her return to Europe she ran in the Fred Darling Stakes at Newbury Racecourse and finished third to Iftiraas, with the future 1000 Guineas winner Lahan in fourth place. Brittain later explained that the filly had been in season at the time of the race. She was then sent to Italy for the Premio Regina Elena in Rome where she finished third to the locally trained fillies Xua and Timi, after being roughly treated by the Italian stalls handlers. A week later Crimplene was in Düsseldorf for the Henckel-Rennen, Germany's equivalent of the 1000 Guineas. Drawn on the wide outside of the fifteen runner field, she took the lead after 400 metres, went clear of the field entering the straight, and won by four lengths from the Irish-trained Margay. Racing in her fifth country in a little over two months, Crimplene's next appearance was in the Irish 1000 Guineas at the Curragh Racecourse on 28 May. Starting aa a 16/1 outsider she took the lead soon after the start and was never headed, winning by one and a half lengths from the Aidan O'Brien-trained Amethyst, with Storm Dream third and Seazun fourth. After the race Brittain hugged the filly amid a shower of hailstones and commented "that should have been three Guineas", referring to her treatment in Italy.

==== Summer ====
Iftiraas, Seazun, Amethyst and the Poule d'Essai des Pouliches winner Blumamba were among Crimplene's rivals when she contested the Group One Coronation Stakes at Royal Ascot on 23 June. She was made 4/1 joint-favourite with the French-trained Zarkiya, the winner of the Prix de Sandringham. Robinson sent Crimplene into the lead from the start and went clear of the field in the straight to win by two and a half lengths from Princess Ellen. After the race Robinson said: "This filly seems to thrive on racing. She'll be going all over the world. She just loves it". Brittain described the winner as "a bit like me... people have underestimated her".

In August, Crimplene was moved up in distance and matched against older fillies and mares in the ten furlong Nassau Stakes at Goodwood Racecourse. Starting the 7/4 favourite, she took the lead at half way and went five lengths clear of her opponents in the straight. She began to tire in the closing stages but held on to win by one and three quarter lengths from the four-year-old Ela Athena. Commenting on the filly's fourth consecutive major victory, Brittain said: "There may have been a doubt about whether we were right to go a mile and a quarter, but as I said before the race, when you've got an animal of class they can go any distance". Robinson felt that the filly did not truly stay the distance but won on "sheer guts". Eight days later Crimplene was sent to France to contest the Prix Jacques Le Marois over 1600 metres at Deauville Racecourse. She led for most of the race, but was overtaken in the last 400 metres and finished fourth behind the five-year-old horse Muhtathir.

==== Autumn ====
On 23 September, Crimplene was the only female in the field of twelve for the Queen Elizabeth II Stakes at Ascot. She raced in second place for much of the way before weakening in the straight and finishing eighth behind Observatory, who won by half a length from Giant's Causeway. Crimplene's final racecourse appearance came on 4 November, when she was sent to the United States for the Breeders' Cup Distaff over nine furlongs on dirt at Churchill Downs. Starting as a 42/1 outsider, she reached third place in the straight before finishing fourth behind the American filly Spain.

== Assessment ==
Clive Brittain called Crimplene "one of the toughest fillies I have trained, and ranks alongside Pebbles and Sayyedati as one of the best". In the International Classification for 2000, Crimplene was given a rating of 119, making her the best three-year-old filly in Europe over one mile.

== Stud record ==
Crimplene was retired from racing to become a broodmare for the Darley Stud. Her first foal was Crimson Sun, sired by Danzig, who won two minor races and finished second in the Somerville Tattersall Stakes. In 2005, Crimplene died from complications after giving birth to a foal by Storm Cat.

== Pedigree ==
Pedigree of Crimplene (IRE), chestnut mare, 1997
Sire Lion Cavern (USA) 1989	Mr. Prospector (USA); 1970	Raise a Native	Native Dancer
Sire Lion Cavern (USA) 1989	Mr. Prospector (USA); 1970	Raise a Native	Raise You
Sire Lion Cavern (USA) 1989	Mr. Prospector (USA); 1970	Gold Digger	Nashua
Sire Lion Cavern (USA) 1989	Mr. Prospector (USA); 1970	Gold Digger	Sequence
Sire Lion Cavern (USA) 1989	Secrettame (USA); 1978	Secretariat	Bold Ruler
Sire Lion Cavern (USA) 1989	Secrettame (USA); 1978	Secretariat	Somethingroyal
Sire Lion Cavern (USA) 1989	Secrettame (USA); 1978	Tamerett	Tim Tam
Sire Lion Cavern (USA) 1989	Secrettame (USA); 1978	Tamerett	Mixed Marriage
Dam Crimson Conquest (USA) 1988	Diesis (GB); 1980	Sharpen Up	Atan
Dam Crimson Conquest (USA) 1988	Diesis (GB); 1980	Sharpen Up	Rocchetta
Dam Crimson Conquest (USA) 1988	Diesis (GB); 1980	Doubly Sure	Reliance
Dam Crimson Conquest (USA) 1988	Diesis (GB); 1980	Doubly Sure	Soft Angels
Dam Crimson Conquest (USA) 1988	Sweet Ramblin Rose (USA); 1971	Turn-To	Royal Charger
Dam Crimson Conquest (USA) 1988	Sweet Ramblin Rose (USA); 1971	Turn-To	Source Sucree
Dam Crimson Conquest (USA) 1988	Sweet Ramblin Rose (USA); 1971	Velvet Rose	Round Table
Dam Crimson Conquest (USA) 1988	Sweet Ramblin Rose (USA); 1971	Velvet Rose	Pink Velvet (Family: 1-h)
