= Seazun =

Irish-bred Thoroughbred racehorse

- Sire: Zieten
- Grandsire: Danzig
- Dam: Sunset Cafe
- Damsire: Red Sunset
- Sex: Mare
- Foaled: 29 April 1997
- Country: Ireland
- Colour: Bay
- Breeder: Lodge Park Stud
- Owner: John Breslin; Katsumi Yoshida
- Trainer: Mick Channon
- Record: 10: 2-2-0
- Earnings: £114,350

Major wins
- Cheveley Park Stakes (1999)

Seazun (foaled 29 April 1997) is an Irish-bred, British-trained Thoroughbred racehorse and broodmare. In a racing career which lasted from April 1999 until September 2000 she won two of her ten races. As a two-year-old she was one of the best juvenile fillies of her generation, recording a victory over a strong field in the Cheveley Park Stakes after finishing second in the Sirenia Stakes. She failed to win in the following year but finished second in the Fred Darling Stakes and fourth in both the 1000 Guineas and the Irish 1,000 Guineas. Since her retirement from racing she has had some success as a dam of winners in Japan.

== Background ==
Seazun is a bay mare with no white markings bred in Ireland by the County Kilkenny-based Lodge Park Stud. She was sired by the Middle Park Stakes winner Zieten out of the mare Sunset Cafe. Zieten was not a notable success as a stallion although he had an excellent first season and has been described as "a good source of fast two-year-olds". Sunset Cafe, also bred by Lodge Park, was a moderate racehorse who won one minor race at Downpatrick Racecourse in 1993, but her dam, Cafe Au Lait was a half-sister to Hanina, who produced the 1000 Guineas winner Mrs McArdy.

In October 1998 the still unnamed yearling filly was sent to the Tattersalls sales and was bought for 62,000 guineas by the bloodstock agent Charlie Gordon-Watson. She entered the green and white colours of Scottish businessman John Breslin and was sent into training with Mick Channon at West Ilsley in Berkshire.

== Racing career ==
=== 1999: two-year-old season ===
Seazun began her racing career by finishing sixth in a five furlong maiden race at Newmarket Racecourse on 14 April 1999. Two weeks later the filly started 7/2 joint favourite over five and a half furlongs at Brighton Racecourse. Ridden as on her debut by Richard Quinn she accelerated away from her thirteen rivals in the final furlong and won by two and a half lengths from Blue Velvet.

Seazun was off the course for more than four months before returning in the Listed Sirenia Stakes over six furlongs at Kempton Park Racecourse on 8 September. Ridden by Steve Drowne, she finished well to take second place behind Primo Valentino, a colt who went on to win the Middle Park Stakes. Twenty days later, Quinn was back in the saddle when Seazun was one of fourteen fillies to contest the Group One Cheveley Park Stakes at Newmarket. The French-trained Moon Driver (winner of the Prix d'Arenberg) started favourite ahead of Elaflaak (St Hugh's Stakes), Torgau (Cherry Hinton Stakes) and Mall Queen (Prix Yacowlef), with Seazun next in the betting on 10/1. The other runners included Crimplene, Kalindi (Windsor Castle Stakes) and Jemima (Lowther Stakes). Seazun raced down the centre of the wide Newmarket straight as Torgau set the pace, before moving up to challenge approaching the final furlong. She overtook Torgau in the closing stages and won by a head, with a gap of two and a half lengths back to Crimplene in third place. After the race Channon said "I was expecting a big run from [Breslin's] filly. She just needed the run last time" and added "This filly is just quality. She has only had four runs now, we haven't been hard on her".

=== 2000: three-year-old season ===
On her three-year-old debut Seazun was partnered by Frankie Dettori when she contested the Nell Gwyn Stakes (a trial race for the 1000 Guineas) over seven furlongs at Newmarket. Before the race Channon admitted that the filly had been slower to reach full fitness than he had hoped. After being hampered two furlongs out, she recovered to take second place, but was no match for Petrushka, who won by four lengths. On 7 May she started at odds of 10/1 in an 18-runner field for the 1000 Guineas and finished fourth behind Lahan, Princess Ellen and Petrushka. In the Irish 1,000 Guineas at the Curragh three weeks later she finished fourth of the fourteen runners behind Crimplene, Amethyst and Storm Dream. In the Coronation Stakes at Royal Ascot she suffered a broken blood vessel and finished eighth of the nine runners behind Crimplene.

After a two-month break, Seazun returned in the Celebration Mile at Goodwood Racecourse in which she was matched against colts and older horses. Before the race she had been bought by the Japanese owner Katsumi Yoshida. Ridden by Craig Williams she finished fourth of the six runners behind Medicean, Observatory and Cape Town. On her final racecourse appearance, the filly finished seventh behind Danceabout in the Sun Chariot Stakes at Newmarket on 30 September,

== Breeding record ==
Seazun was retired from racing to become a broodmare in Japan. To date (2015) she has produced at least ten foals and five winners:

- Hadid, a bay colt, foaled in 2002, sired by Dubai Millennium. Unraced.
- B of the Bang, bay colt, 2003, by King's Best. Won four races.
- Gale Hurricane, brown colt, 2004, by Taiki Shuttle. Failed to win in seven races.
- Nor Bu Kling Ba, bay filly, 2006, by Dance in the Dark. Unraced.
- Seasons Best, brown filly, 2007, by Zenno Rob Roy. Won three races.
- Tempel, brown colt, 2008, by Deep Impact. Won three races.
- Admire Deep, bay colt, 2010, by Deep Impact. Won three races.
- Glengyle, bay colt, 2011, by Zenno Rob Roy. Won two races to date (November 2015).
- Red Virago, bay filly, 2012, by Neo Universe. Failed to win in two race to date (November 2015).
- Charmaine, filly, 2013, by Victoire Pisa. Failed to win in five races to date (November 2015).

== Pedigree ==
Pedigree of Seazun (IRE), bay mare, 1997
Sire Zieten (USA) 1990	Danzig (USA); 1977	Northern Dancer	Nearctic
Sire Zieten (USA) 1990	Danzig (USA); 1977	Northern Dancer	Natalma
Sire Zieten (USA) 1990	Danzig (USA); 1977	Pas de Nom	Admiral's Voyage
Sire Zieten (USA) 1990	Danzig (USA); 1977	Pas de Nom	Petitioner
Sire Zieten (USA) 1990	Blue Note(FR); 1985	Habitat	Sir Gaylord
Sire Zieten (USA) 1990	Blue Note(FR); 1985	Habitat	Little Hut
Sire Zieten (USA) 1990	Blue Note(FR); 1985	Balsamique	Tourangeau
Sire Zieten (USA) 1990	Blue Note(FR); 1985	Balsamique	Bruyere
Dam Sunset Cafe (IRE) 1990	Red Sunset (IRE); 1979	Red God	Nasrullah
Dam Sunset Cafe (IRE) 1990	Red Sunset (IRE); 1979	Red God	Spring Run
Dam Sunset Cafe (IRE) 1990	Red Sunset (IRE); 1979	Centre Piece	Tompion
Dam Sunset Cafe (IRE) 1990	Red Sunset (IRE); 1979	Centre Piece	Table Rose
Dam Sunset Cafe (IRE) 1990	Cafe Au Lait (GB); 1968	Espresso	Acropolis
Dam Sunset Cafe (IRE) 1990	Cafe Au Lait (GB); 1968	Espresso	Babylon
Dam Sunset Cafe (IRE) 1990	Cafe Au Lait (GB); 1968	Blue Sash	Djebe
Dam Sunset Cafe (IRE) 1990	Cafe Au Lait (GB); 1968	Blue Sash	Star of India (Family: 14-b)
