= 2000 1000 Guineas =

187th 1000 Guineas Stakes
- 1000 Guineas
- Location: Newmarket Racecourse
- Date: 7 May 2000
- Winning horse: Lahan (GB)
- Jockey: Richard Hills
- Trainer: John Gosden (GB)
- Owner: Hamdan Al Maktoum

The 2000 1000 Guineas Stakes was a horse race held at Newmarket Racecourse on Sunday 7 May 2000. It was the 187th running of the 1000 Guineas.

The winner was Hamdan Al Maktoum's Lahan, a British-bred bay filly trained at Manton in Wiltshire by John Gosden and ridden by Richard Hills. Lahan's victory was the first in the race for her trainer. Hamdan Al Maktoum had won the race before with Salsabil (1990), Shadayid (1991) and Harayir (1996), the last of which had given Richard Hills his only previous winner in the race. It was also the first classic success for Lahan's sire Unfuwain who was also the damsire of the runner-up and the sire of the third-placed filly.

== The contenders ==
The race attracted a field of eighteen runners, seventeen trained in the United Kingdom and one in Ireland: there were no challengers from continental Europe. The favourite was the unbeaten Michael Stoute-trained Petrushka who had won the Nell Gwyn Stakes on her most recent appearance. The Irish challenger was Amethyst, trained by Aidan O'Brien at Ballydoyle who had won the Leopardstown 1,000 Guineas Trial Stakes three weeks earlier. The Godolphin Racing stable entered Bintalreef, a filly who had won her only race as a two-year-old before wintering in Dubai. The other fancied runners included Seazun, winner of the Cheveley Park Stakes and the Henry Cecil-trained High Walden, the winner of a maiden race at Leicester Racecourse. Major winners who were less well-supported included the Rockfel Stakes winner Lahan, the Cherry Hinton Stakes winner Torgau (voted Cartier Champion Two-year-old Filly of 1999), the Oh So Sharp Stakes winner Agrippina and the Sweet Solera Stakes winner Princess Ellen. Petrushka headed the betting at odds of 6/4 ahead of Bintalreef (5/2) and High Walden (9/1) with Amethyst and Seazun on 10/1.

== The race ==
At the start of the race, the fillies looked likely to split into two groups on the wide Newmarket straight, but soon converged to race up the stands side (the left side from the jockeys' viewpoint). The 50/1 outsider Velvet Lady set the pace from the 200/1 shot Claranet with Torgau, Amethyst, Bintalreef, Issey Rose and Princess Ellen close behind. The field bunched a quarter of a mile from the finish, with Petrushka, Lahan, Princess Ellen, Halland Park Girl, Aunty Rose and Bintalreef being affected by the resulting congestion, while Seazun made progress on the outside. Having obtained a clear run, Lahan accelerated through the centre of the field and took the lead approaching the final furlong. Princess Ellen stayed on along the rail to emerge as the only serious challenger, but Lahan won by one and a quarter lengths. Petrushka was three lengths back in third ahead of Seaun and High Walden, Velvet Lady, Torgau and Amethyst. The second favourite Bintalreef finished last of the eighteen runners, having pulled a muscle exiting the starting stalls and never raced again.

== Race details ==
- Sponsor: Sagitta
- First prize: £145,000
- Surface: Turf
- Going: Good
- Distance: 8 furlongs
- Number of runners: 18
- Winner's time: 1:36.38

== Full result ==
Pos.	Marg.	Horse (bred)	Jockey	Trainer (Country)	Odds
1		Lahan (GB)	Richard Hills	John Gosden (GB)	14/1
2	1¼	Princess Ellen (GB)	Kevin Darley	Gerard Butler (GB)	66/1
3	3	Petrushka (IRE)	Kieren Fallon	Michael Stoute (GB)	6/4 fav
4	½	Seazun (IRE)	John Reid	Mick Channon (GB)	10/1
5	¾	High Walden (USA)	Richard Quinn	Henry Cecil (GB)	9/1
6	shd	Velvet Lady (GB)	Jimmy Fortune	Paul Cole (GB)	50/1
7	1½	Torgau (IRE)	Olivier Peslier	Giles Bravery (GB)	25/1
8	nk	Amethyst (IRE)	Mick Kinane	Aidan O'Brien (IRE)	10/1
9	hd	Chez Cherie (GB)	Gerald Mosse	Luca Cumani (GB)	66/1
10	shd	Icicle (GB)	Ray Cochrane	James Fanshawe (GB)	66/1
11	shd	Claranet (GB)	Franny Norton	Kamil Mahdi (GB)	200/1
12	nk	Moselle (GB)	Jamie Spencer	William Haggas (GB)	100/1
13	¾	Agrippina (GB)	Jason Weaver	Alan Bailey (GB)	33/1
14	¾	Halland Park Girl (IRE)	Dane O'Neill	Richard Hannon, Sr. (GB)	66/1
15	nk	Aunty Rose (IRE)	Pat Eddery	John Dunlop (GB)	20/1
16	1¾	Issey Rose (IRE)	Tony Clark	Terry Mills (GB)	66/1
17	3	Miletrian (IRE)	Michael Roberts	Mick Channon (GB)	66/1
18	3	Bintalreef (USA)	Frankie Dettori	Saeed bin Suroor (GB)	5/2

- Abbreviations: nse = nose; nk = neck; shd = head; hd = head; dist = distance; UR = unseated rider; DSQ = disqualified; PU = pulled up

== Winner's details ==
Further details of the winner, Lahan

- Foaled: 22 January 1997
- Country: United Kingdom
- Sire: Unfuwain; Dam: Ballet Shoes (Mr Prospector)
- Owner: Hamdan Al Maktoum
- Breeder: Shadwell Estates
