= Connaught Bridge =

Irish-bred Thoroughbred racehorse

- Sire: Connaught
- Grandsire: St. Paddy
- Dam: Fishermans Bridge
- Damsire: Crepello
- Sex: Mare
- Foaled: 2 May 1976
- Country: Ireland
- Colour: Chestnut
- Breeder: Burton Agnes Stud
- Owner: H. Barker; Peter Harris
- Trainer: Henry Cecil
- Record: 9: 5-2-2

Major wins
- Nassau Stakes (1979); Yorkshire Oaks (1979)

Awards
- Timeform rating 105 (1978), 124 (1979)

Connaught Bridge (2 May 1976 – after 1994) was an Irish-bred Thoroughbred racehorse. Trained in the United Kingdom by Henry Cecil she raced for two seasons, winning five of her nine races. As a two-year-old she showed some promise, winning twice from five attempts. In the following year she did not run competitively until July, but after finishing third on her seasonal debut she established herself as one of the best middle-distance in Britain by winning the Nassau Stakes, Yorkshire Oaks and Twickenham Stakes. She was retired from racing at the end of 1979 and has had some influence as a broodmare.

== Background ==
Connaught Bridge was a chestnut mare bred in Ireland by the Burton Agnes Stud. She had a number of white markings including a long white stocking on her right hind leg, white socks on her other feet, a large, diamond-shaped white star and a large white patch above her left nostril.

She was from the fifth crop of foals sired by Connaught, a talented but temperamental horse who finished second in the 1968 Epsom Derby before winning the Eclipse Stakes in 1970 and two editions of the Prince of Wales's Stakes. Connaught Bridge's dam Fishermans Bridge was a talented racemare who finished second in the Nassau Stakes in 1973. She was descended from the broodmare Rustic Bridge, who produced the St Leger winning filly Cantelo and was the direct female-line ancestor of the four-time Ascot Gold Cup winner Yeats.

As a yearling, Connaught Bridge was sent to the sales and bought for 2,500 guineas by representatives of H. Barker. The filly was sent into training with Henry Cecil at his Warren Place stable at Newmarket, Suffolk.

== Racing career ==
=== 1978: two-year-old season ===
After finishing second and third in minor races over five and six furlongs respectively, Connaught Bridge recorded her first win over seven furlongs in August, beating eleven opponents when odds-on favourite for a maiden race at Great Yarmouth Racecourse. When moved up in distance for a Nursery (a Handicap race for two-year-olds) over one mile at Doncaster Racecourse she was beaten a neck by the colt Messenger of Peace. On her final appearance of the season the filly was moved up in distance and defeated twenty opponents in a minor event over nine furlongs at Wolverhampton Racecourse in October.

=== 1979: three-year-old season ===
As a three-year-old, Connaught Bridge did not race in the spring and did not contest either the 1000 Guineas or the Oaks Stakes. She made her seasonal debut in July when she finished third to the colts Conte Santi and Bold Shot over one mile at York Racecourse. Despite her defeat, she was then moved up in class and distance for the Nassau Stakes (then a Group Two race) over ten furlongs at Goodwood Racecourse. She was ridden by Joe Mercer, who chose her in preference to the Cecil stable's other filly Odeon. She started at odds of 5/1 in a ten-runner field with her main opposition appearing to come from the French-trained fillies Tintagel (winner of the Prix Corrida) and Tempus Fugit (Prix de la Nonette, Prix Penelope, Prix Exbury). Connaught Bridge was among the leaders from the start before taking the advantage in the final furlong and winning by one and a half lengths from Odeon with Tempus Fugit in third.

In August Connaught Bridge was again moved up in class and distance for the Yorkshire Oaks over one and a half miles at York in which she was again by Mercer and she started at odds of 9/2. Her four opponents were Godetia, winner of the Irish 1000 Guineas and the Irish Oaks, Reprocolor (Lancashire Oaks), Senorita Poquito (runner-up in the Ribblesdale Stakes) and Britannia's Rule (winner of the Lupe Stakes and third in The Oaks). After racing at the rear of the field in the early stages, Connaught Bridge moved forward in the straight and engaged in a protracted struggle with Reproclor before drawing away in the final furlong. She won by three lengths from Senorita Poquito who overtook the weakening Reprocolor in the closing stages.

Following her win at York, Connaught Bridge was sold privately to the breeder Peter Harris. On her only subsequent appearance, Connaught Bridge was brought back in distance for the Twickenham Stakes over ten furlongs on firm ground at Kempton Park Racecourse in September in which she was required to concede weight to opponents including Britannia's Rule, the Epsom Oaks runner-up Bonnie Isle and the Musidora Stakes winner Rimosa's Pet. After racing just behind the leaders in the early stages she moved to the front inside the last quarter mile and accelerated clear of her rivals to win by three lengths from Head Huntress. She did not race again, being withdrawn from an engagement in the Sun Chariot Stakes and was retired at the end of the year.

== Assessment and awards ==
In the British Free Handicap for 1978, a ranking of the best two-year-olds to have raced in Great Britain that year, Connaught Bridge was given a weight of 112 pounds, 21 pounds behind the top-rated Tromos and fifteen pounds behind the top filly Devon Ditty. The independent Timeform organisation gave her a rating of 105, twenty-nine pounds behind Tromos and twenty-seven behind their top two-year-old filly Sigy. In their annual Racehorses of 1978 Timeform commented that she would be "suited by 1¼m+".

In the International Classification for 1979, Connaught Bridge was the highest rated British-trained three-year-old filly level with One In A Million, but fourteen pounds behind the French filly Three Troikas. She was rated 124 by Timeform, nine pounds behind their top-rated three-year-old filly Three Troikas.

== Breeding record ==
After her retirement from racing Connaught Bridge became a broodmare at Harris's Pendley Farm Stud in Hertfordshire. She produced at least eight foals and three winners between 1982 and 1994:

- Kindjal, a filly, foaled in 1982, sired by Kris. Failed to win in three races.
- Wassl Reef, bay colt, 1983, by Mill Reef. Won four races.
- Conmaiche, bay colt, 1984, by Kings Lake. Won three races including the Prix Saint-Roman.
- Munjarid, chestnut colt, 1985, by Habitat. Failed to win in fourteen races.
- Class Adorns, bay filly, 1987, by Sadler's Wells. Failed to win in two races.
- Lydia Maria, bay filly, 1988, by Dancing Brave. Failed to win in nine races.
- Dorothea Brooke, bay filly, 1992, by Dancing Brave. Won one of her ten races. As a broodmare, she is the dam of the Middle Park Stakes winner Primo Valentino and the Cherry Hinton Stakes winner Dora Carrington, herself the dam of the Colin Stephen Quality Handicap winner Julienas
- Kristal Bridge, chestnut filly, 1994, by Kris. Failed to win in eight races. As a broodmare she produced Overturn.

== Pedigree ==
Pedigree of Connaught Bridge, chestnut filly, 1976
Sire Connaught (GB) 1965	St. Paddy (GB); 1957	Aureole	Hyperion
Sire Connaught (GB) 1965	St. Paddy (GB); 1957	Aureole	Angelola
Sire Connaught (GB) 1965	St. Paddy (GB); 1957	Edie Kelly	Bois Roussel
Sire Connaught (GB) 1965	St. Paddy (GB); 1957	Edie Kelly	Caerlissa
Sire Connaught (GB) 1965	Nagaika (FR); 1954	Goyama	Goya
Sire Connaught (GB) 1965	Nagaika (FR); 1954	Goyama	Devineress
Sire Connaught (GB) 1965	Nagaika (FR); 1954	Naim	Amfortas
Sire Connaught (GB) 1965	Nagaika (FR); 1954	Naim	Nacelle
Dam Fishermans Bridge (GB) 1970	Crepello (GB); 1954	Donatello	Blenheim
Dam Fishermans Bridge (GB) 1970	Crepello (GB); 1954	Donatello	Delleana
Dam Fishermans Bridge (GB) 1970	Crepello (GB); 1954	Crepuscule	Mieuxce
Dam Fishermans Bridge (GB) 1970	Crepello (GB); 1954	Crepuscule	Red Sunset
Dam Fishermans Bridge (GB) 1970	Riva (GB); 1964	Relic	War Relic
Dam Fishermans Bridge (GB) 1970	Riva (GB); 1964	Relic	Bridal Colors
Dam Fishermans Bridge (GB) 1970	Riva (GB); 1964	Canvas	Botticelli
Dam Fishermans Bridge (GB) 1970	Riva (GB); 1964	Canvas	Rustic Bridge (Family:1-m)
