= Pebbles (horse) =

British Thoroughbred racehorse (1981–2005)

- Sire: Sharpen Up
- Grandsire: Atan
- Dam: La Dolce
- Damsire: Connaught
- Sex: Filly
- Foaled: 1981
- Country: Great Britain
- Colour: Chestnut
- Breeder: Marcos Lemos
- Owner: Marcos Lemos; Sheikh Mohammed
- Trainer: Clive Brittain
- Record: 15: 8-5-0
- Earnings: £1,182,140

Major wins
- Nell Gwyn Stakes (1984); 1,000 Guineas (1984); Sandown Mile (1985); Eclipse Stakes (1985); Champion Stakes (1985); Breeders' Cup Turf (1985)

Awards
- British Horse of the Year (1985); Timeform Horse of the Year (1985); U.S. Champion Female Turf Horse (1985); European Champion (6½ – 10½ furlongs) (1985); British Champions Series Hall of Fame (2023)

Honours
- Grade III Pebbles Stakes at Belmont Park; Timeform rating: 135
- Last updated on 16 November 2022

Pebbles (27 February 1981–9 September 2005) was a British-bred Thoroughbred racehorse. In a racing career which lasted from 1983 until 1985, she ran fifteen times and won eight races. After showing good form as a two-year-old in 1983, she won the 1000 Guineas as a three-year-old the next spring. In 1985 Pebbles produced her most notable performances, becoming the first filly to win the Eclipse Stakes and then defeating an exceptionally strong field in the Champion Stakes. On her final racecourse appearance she became the first British-trained racehorse to win a Breeders' Cup race, when she won the Breeders' Cup Turf. She is regarded as one of the greatest fillies of the modern era.

== Background ==
Pebbles was a chestnut filly with a white blaze, bred in England by the Greek shipping magnate Marcos Lemos whose blue and white colours she carried for her first seven races. Pebbles was the first foal of her dam, La Dolce, who finished fifth in the 1979 Epsom Oaks. As a descendant of the mare Aloe, she was related to such notable racehorses as Round Table, Known Fact and Parthia. Pebbles' sire, Sharpen Up, was a highly successful breeding stallion, best known as a strong influence for speed rather than stamina. Pebbles was sent into training with Clive Brittain at Newmarket, Suffolk.

== Racing career ==
=== 1983: two-year-old season ===
As a two-year-old in 1983 Pebbles finished unplaced on her first appearance and then won the Kingsclere Stakes at Newbury by four lengths. In June she ran in the Childwick Stud Stakes at Newmarket and won by three lengths from Sajeda, leading Brittain to comment that she was one of the best fillies he had trained. Pebbles was off the course for two months before being moved up in class for the Group Two Lowther Stakes at York. She finished fourth behind Prickle and Desirable, beaten four lengths. Pebbles then started favourite for the Waterford Candelabra Stakes at Goodwood but sweated badly before the race and appeared to tire in the closing stages before finishing fifth behind Shoot Clear. In the Cheveley Park Stakes at Newmarket in September, Pebbles was made a 33/1 outsider in the twelve runner field. Ridden by Philip Robinson, she produced her best performance of the season, producing a "strong run" in the closing stages and failing by a head to catch Desirable. In the Free Handicap, a rating of the best European two-year-olds, Pebbles was given a weight of 119 pounds, fourteen pounds behind the top-rated El Gran Senor and six pounds below the leading filly Almeira.

=== 1984: three-year-old season ===
Pebbles began her three-year-old season in 1984 by returning to Newmarket to win the Nell Gwyn Stakes in April. She took the lead two furlongs from the finish and beat Meis-El-Reem by one and a half lengths. In the 1000 Guineas over one mile at the next Newmarket meeting, Pebbles started at odds of 8/1 behind the 6/5 favourite Mahogany, who had beaten Shoot Clear in the Fred Darling Stakes. Pebbles sweated freely and became nervous and agitated before the race: as the fillies were moving onto the course she abruptly spun round and hit a gate. In the race however, she was an emphatic winner, taking the lead in the final quarter mile and drawing steadily clear to win by three lengths from Meis-El-Reem, Desirable and Shoot Clear. Pebbles was considered a contender for the Oaks at Epsom but was purchased by Sheikh Mohammed, who already owned two of the favourites for the race. Pebbles was rerouted to Royal Ascot for the one mile Coronation Stakes in which she was matched against the Irish 1,000 Guineas winner Katies. Robinson, given the choice of rides, opted to partner Katies. Lester Piggott was booked to ride Pebbles. Pebbles took the lead in the straight but was overtaken in the final furlong and beaten one and a half lengths by Katies, with the two fillies pulling well clear of their eight opponents. Brittain pointed out that the filly had been trained with the Oaks in mind and had been prepared to race over one and a half miles rather than the one mile distance. Pebbles was trained for a rematch with Katies in the Child Stakes with Piggott again booked but stood on a stone before the race and was withdrawn. The injury failed to respond to treatment and x-ray revealed a chipped bone in her foot which kept her off the course until autumn.

Pebbles returned in the Champion Stakes at Newmarket in October. She raced over ten furlongs, the longest distance she had attempted and also competed against colts and older horses for the first time. Pebbles looked calmer than usual before the race and settled well towards the back of the field. In the closing stages she was switched to the outside and accelerated into contention before finishing second by a neck to the French-trained colt Palace Music who won in a course record time. In the International Classification for 1984, Pebbles was rated the fifth best three-year-old filly in Europe behind Northern Trick, Katies, the Oaks winner Circus Plume and the Irish Oaks winner Princess Pati.

=== 1985: four-year-old season ===
Pebbles stayed in training at four and began her season by running in the inaugural Trusthouse Forte Mile at Sandown Park Racecourse in April. Ridden by Steve Cauthen, she recorded her first win in almost a year, beating Vacarme by one and a half lengths. On her next start, she was sent to Royal Ascot in June where she was matched against the 1984 St Leger winner Commanche Run, who had won the Brigadier Gerard Stakes by twelve lengths on his reappearance. Pebbles defeated the colt by a short head, but both the favourites finished behind the 33/1 outsider Bob Back. It was subsequently revealed that Pebbles had been in season at the time of her only defeat of the year.

Pebbles faced Bob Back again in the Eclipse Stakes at Sandown, a race which no filly or mare had won since its inception in 1886. Commanche Run was a late withdrawal from the race, but the field included the Coronation Cup winner Rainbow Quest, who started 4/5 favourite. Brittain was worried that the filly's temperament would lead her to become over-excited and deliberately brought her into the paddock late. Pebbles was then re-plated, which Brittain later admitted was a deliberate ploy to delay the race and give her time to relax. Pebbles tracked the pacemaker August until accelerating into a clear lead early in the straight. According to Timeform, she "never looked in the slightest danger" and won easily by two lengths from Rainbow Quest, who went on to win that season's Prix de l'Arc de Triomphe. Pebbles was expected to run next in either the King George VI and Queen Elizabeth Stakes or the Budweiser Million, but for unexplained reasons, she lost her appetite after her Eclipse win and Brittain decided to rest the filly until autumn.

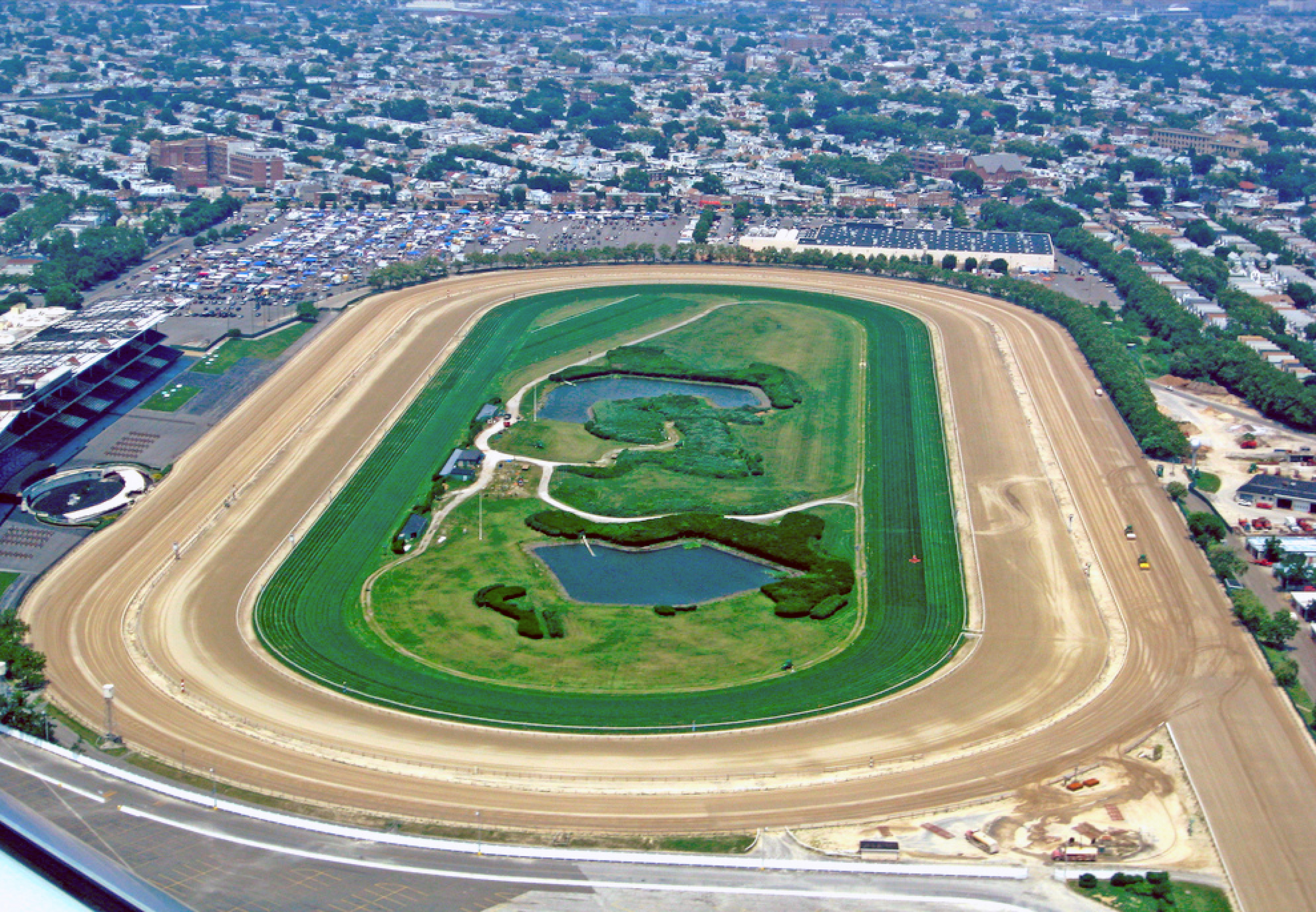
Aqueduct Race Track, the scene of Pebbles' most valuable win.

Pebbles returned for a highly anticipated renewal of the Champion Stakes. The field included the previous year's winner, Palace Music, Epsom Derby winner Slip Anchor and Commanche Run, who had won both the International Stakes and the Irish Champion Stakes, making him eligible for a $1M bonus if he added the Newmarket race. Ridden by Pat Eddery, Pebbles was restrained in the early stages before moving forward to dispute the lead a furlong from the finish. Eddery took a long look over his shoulder at the struggling opposition before allowing Pebbles to sprint clear. She was eased down in the last strides to win by three lengths from Slip Anchor, Palace Music and the Irish Oaks winner Helen Street. On her final appearance, Pebbles was sent to New York to contest the second running of the Breeders' Cup Turf at Aqueduct Race Track. Her owner paid a supplementary fee of $240,000 to run her in the $2M race, as she had not been among the original entries. Although it was the filly's first run abroad and her first over the distance of one and a half miles, she started 11/5 favourite in a field of fourteen. Pebbles missed most of the pre-race parade after Brittain bribed one of the Aqueduct staff to open a walkway, allowing her to join the other runners at the last moment. Eddery settled Pebbles at the back of the field in the early stages before moving up on the inside to take the lead early in the straight. The filly immediately went clear and held the late challenge of the Australian Champion Strawberry Road by a neck in a course record time of 2:27.00.

On the strength of her single victory in the United States, Pebbles was awarded the 1985 Eclipse Award for American Champion Female Turf Horse. In the International Classification for 1985, Pebbles was the highest rated filly in Europe and the highest rated horse in the 6½ to 10½ furlong division. In the annual poll conducted by the Racegoers' Club, Pebbles received twenty-eight of the thirty votes to be named British Horse of the Year. She was also named Horse of the Year by Timeform. In their book A Century of Champions, Tony Morris and John Randall rated Pebbles the fourth-best British filly of the twentieth century behind Pretty Polly, Sun Chariot and Sceptre.

== Temperament ==
Pebbles, in addition to her success as a racer, was known for her assorted unique quirks. She was frequently accompanied by a gelding named Come On The Blues (the winner of the Royal Hunt Cup) who exerted a calming influence on the highly strung filly and escorted her to America for the second running of the Breeders' Cup. Brittain described Pebbles as an extremely difficult horse to manage and one who could not be trained in the conventional way, noting that she spent more time swimming than galloping. She also was known for consuming a pint of Guinness a day.

== Retirement ==
Pebbles was not a success as a broodmare. Despite producing foals by such prominent stallions as Nureyev, Caerleon, Green Desert and Reference Point, none of her progeny distinguished themselves as racehorses. In 1996 Pebbles was sent to the Darley Stud's Fukumitsu Farm in Japan. She was retired from breeding in 2002 and died in September 2005.

== Pedigree ==
Pedigree of Pebbles (GB), chestnut mare 1981
Sire Sharpen Up (GB) 1969	Atan; 1961	Native Dancer	Polynesian
Sire Sharpen Up (GB) 1969	Atan; 1961	Native Dancer	Geisha
Sire Sharpen Up (GB) 1969	Atan; 1961	Mixed Marriage	Tudor Minstrel
Sire Sharpen Up (GB) 1969	Atan; 1961	Mixed Marriage	Persian Maid
Sire Sharpen Up (GB) 1969	Rocchetta; 1961	Rockefella	Hyperion
Sire Sharpen Up (GB) 1969	Rocchetta; 1961	Rockefella	Rockfel
Sire Sharpen Up (GB) 1969	Rocchetta; 1961	Chambiges	Majano
Sire Sharpen Up (GB) 1969	Rocchetta; 1961	Chambiges	Chanterelle
Dam La Dolce (GB) 1976	Connaught; 1965	St. Paddy	Aureole
Dam La Dolce (GB) 1976	Connaught; 1965	St. Paddy	Edie Kelly
Dam La Dolce (GB) 1976	Connaught; 1965	Nagaika	Goyama
Dam La Dolce (GB) 1976	Connaught; 1965	Nagaika	Naim
Dam La Dolce (GB) 1976	Guiding Light; 1965	Crepello	Donatello
Dam La Dolce (GB) 1976	Guiding Light; 1965	Crepello	Crepuscule
Dam La Dolce (GB) 1976	Guiding Light; 1965	Arbitrate	Arbar
Dam La Dolce (GB) 1976	Guiding Light; 1965	Arbitrate	Above Board (Family:2-f)
