= Peeress (horse) =

British-bred Thoroughbred racehorse

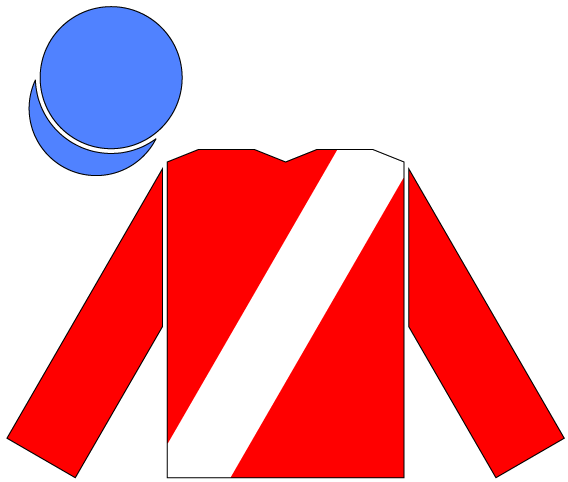
- Racing colours of Cheveley Park Stud
- Sire: Pivotal
- Grandsire: Polar Falcon
- Dam: Noble One
- Damsire: Primo Dominie
- Sex: Mare
- Foaled: 1 February 2001
- Country: United Kingdom
- Colour: Chestnut
- Breeder: Cheveley Park Stud
- Owner: Cheveley Park Stud
- Trainer: Michael Stoute
- Record: 18:7-2-4
- Earnings: £504,361

Major wins
- Windsor Forest Stakes (2005); Sun Chariot Stakes (2005); Lockinge Stakes (2006)

Peeress (foaled 1 February 2001) is a British Thoroughbred racehorse and broodmare. In a racing career which lasted from November 2003 until May 2007 raced eighteen times and won seven races, showing her best form over a distance of one mile. After finishing third in her only race as a two-year-old and won three times in the following year but appeared to be below top class. As a four-year-old she showed considerable improvement, winning the Windsor Forest Stakes in June and the Group One Sun Chariot Stakes in October. As a five-year-old she won a second race at the highest level, defeating male opposition in the Lockinge Stakes. In addition to her victories, she was placed in the Falmouth Stakes, Prix Jacques Le Marois and Matron Stakes. Peeress was retired to stud in 2007 and has made a successful start as a broodmare.

== Background ==
Peeress is a chestnut mare with a faint white star bred and raced by David and Patricia Thompson's Cheveley Park Stud. Her sire Pivotal was a top class sprinter who won the King's Stand Stakes and the Nunthorpe Stakes in 1996. He went on to become an "excellent" sire, getting the winners of more than a thousand races across a range of distances including Sariska, Somnus, Halfwy to Heaven, Kyllachy (Nunthorpe Stakes) and Excellent Art (St James's Palace Stakes). Peeress's dam, Noble One, by the sprinter Primo Dominie won two minor races over five furlongs but failed when moved up to Listed class. Both PIvotal and Noble One were bred at the Cheveley Park Stud.

The filly was sent into training with Michael Stoute at his Freemason Lodge stables in Newmarket, Suffolk.

== Racing career ==
=== 2003–2004: two- and three-year-old seasons ===
Peeress did not race as a two-year-old until November, and then made only one appearance, finishing third in a seven furlong maiden race at Newmarket Racecourse. On her three-year-old debut, the filly was made the 10/11 favourite for a maiden over one mile at Bath and won comfortably from ten opponents. In June she was assigned top weight of 131 Pound pounds in an all-aged handicap race at Thirsk Racecourse and won by three quarters of a length from the six-year-old Waterpark. In July she won her third race in succession when she took a seven furlong handicap at Newmarket but was then beaten into third place when contesting a more valuable handicap at Goodwood. Peeress was off the course for three months after her defeat at Goodwood and was then moved up in class for the Listed Fleur de Lys Stakes at Lingfield Park Racecourse. Racing on a Polytrack surface for the first time, she finished fourth of twelve runners, after her jockey Darryll Holland had been unab;e to obtain a clear run in the straight. She ended the year with a rating of 96, suggesting that she was approximately ten pounds below Group race class.

=== 2005: four-year-old season ===
Peeress began her third season on the Listed Michael Seely Memorial Stakes over seven furlongs at York Racecourse in May. Ridden by Mick Kinane she started the 13/8 favourite and recorded her most important success up to that time as she won "readily" by two and a half lengths from Dumnoni. At Epsom Downs Racecourse in June she was moved up to Group Three class for the Princess Elizabeth Stakes but was beaten two lengths by the Godolphin filly Sundrop: Stoute later stated that she was unsuited by the course. The "Royal Ascot" meeting of 2005 was transferred to York, where Peeress was promoted to Group Two class for the Windsor Forest Stakes, in which her opponents included Sundrop, Soviet Song and Airwave. Starting a 14/1 outsider, Peeress was positioned just behind the leader by Kinane before moving forward in the last quarter mile. She overtook Sundrop 100 yards from the finish and won by two lengths, with Soviet Song, carrying five pounds more than the winner a further one and three quarter lengths further back in third. The first three from the Windsor Forest met again at level weights in Group One Falmouth Stakes at Newamrket three weeks later. Peeress disputed the lead for most of the way but was overtaken in the final furlong and finished third to Soviet Song and the Irish filly Alexander Goldrun.

On 1 October, Peeress, ridden by the veteran Kevin Darley started at odds of 7/1 for the Group One Sun Chariot Stakes over the Rowley Mile course at Newmarket. Her stable companion Chic was made favourite while her other opponents included the previous Group One winners Virginia Waters, Maid's Causeway (Coronation Stakes) and Favourable Terms (Nassau Stakes). The ten fillies split into three group across the width of the straight course, with Darley positioning Peeress on the rail furthest from the stands. Two furlongs from the finish Peeress took the overall lead and stayed on to win by one and a half lengths from the 50/1 outsider Summitville. Michael Stoute described the winner as "a tough performer" who had been particularly well suited by the soft ground conditions. Two weeks later, Peeress was moved down in distance for the Challenge Stakes at the same course and, carrying a four pound weight penalty for her Group One win, finished fourth of the fifteen runners behind La Vie dei Colori.

=== 2006–2007: five- and six-year-old seasons ===
Peeress remained in training as a five-year-old, beginning her season in the Lockinge Stakes at Newbury Racecourse in May. She once again ran on her favoured soft ground in a race which was made more of a stamina test by a strong headwind. Ridden by Kieren Fallon, she was made the 4/1 second favourite, with Soviet Song heading the betting at 7/2. Fallon restrained the mare towards the back of the nine runner field in the early stages before taking the lead approaching the final furlong. Peeress won her second successive Group One race by one and three quarter lengths from Major's Cast with Court Masterpiece three and a half lengths away in third. The Cheveley Park Stud's director, Chris Richardson said "like so many Pivotals, she has matured physically with age. She also has one of those wonderful relaxed temperaments." Stoute commented; "Last year Peeress improved throughout the season. She did it as a 4-year-old and now she has upped a gear again. Once Kieren asked her to go she won it quickly."

At Royal Ascot, Peeress started favourite for the Queen Anne Stakes but finished fourth to the colt Ad Valorem, having been bumped by the winner inside the final furlong. Chris Richardson commented; "I think she has been very unlucky... she didn’t deserve to be squeezed up like that. It was a messy race." She returned to all-female competition at Newmarket in July and finished fourth to three-year-old Rajeem in the Falmouth Stakes. In August, the mare competed internationally for the first time in the Prix Jacques Le Marois at Deauville Racecourse. In a closely contested finish she was beaten a head and a neck into third by Librettist and Manduro, with Ad Valorem and Ramonti among the unplaced runners. On next appearance she was sent to Ireland for the Matron Stakes at the Curragh. Ridden by Ryan Moore, she finished strongly, but failed by a short head to catch the three-year-old Red Evie. She was expected to start favourite to win a second Sun Chariot Stakes but was withdrawn on the morning of the race when she was found to be running an abnormal temperature.

In May 2007, Peeress, now a six-year-old, attempted to repeat her 2006 victory in the Lockinge Stakes, but despite starting favourite, she ran disappointingly, finishing seventh of the eight runners behind Red Evie. It was the first time in her eighteen races that Peeress had finished worse than fourth and her retirement to stud was announced a week later. Commenting on the decision, Richardson said that "Peeress owes us absolutely nothing and has been a great servant to the stud, and hopefully she will do just as well in her new career."

== Assessment ==
In the 2006 edition of the World Thoroughbred Rankings, Peeress was given a rating of 117, making her the 72nd best racehorse in the world and the fifth best older female.

== Stud record ==
Peeress was retired from racing to become a broodmare for the Cheveley Park Stud. Her first two foals to race have both been winners: Ladyship, a filly sired by Oasis Dream has won two races included the Listed City Plate at Chester Racecourse, while Enobled [sic], a colt by Dansili won a maiden race at Goodwood in 2013.

== Pedigree ==
Pedigree of Peeress (GB), chestnut mare, 2001
Sire Pivotal (GB) 1993	Polar Falcon (USA); 1987	Nureyev	Northern Dancer
Sire Pivotal (GB) 1993	Polar Falcon (USA); 1987	Nureyev	Special
Sire Pivotal (GB) 1993	Polar Falcon (USA); 1987	Marie d'Argonne	Jefferson
Sire Pivotal (GB) 1993	Polar Falcon (USA); 1987	Marie d'Argonne	Mohair
Sire Pivotal (GB) 1993	Fearless Revival (GB); 1987	Cozzene	Caro
Sire Pivotal (GB) 1993	Fearless Revival (GB); 1987	Cozzene	Ride The Trails
Sire Pivotal (GB) 1993	Fearless Revival (GB); 1987	Stufida	Bustino
Sire Pivotal (GB) 1993	Fearless Revival (GB); 1987	Stufida	Zerbinetta
Dam Noble One (GB) 1996	Primo Dominie (GB); 1982	Dominion	Derring-Do
Dam Noble One (GB) 1996	Primo Dominie (GB); 1982	Dominion	Picture Palace
Dam Noble One (GB) 1996	Primo Dominie (GB); 1982	Swan Ann	My Swanee
Dam Noble One (GB) 1996	Primo Dominie (GB); 1982	Swan Ann	Anna Barry
Dam Noble One (GB) 1996	Noble Destiny (GB); 1988	Dancing Brave	Lyphard
Dam Noble One (GB) 1996	Noble Destiny (GB); 1988	Dancing Brave	Navajo Princess
Dam Noble One (GB) 1996	Noble Destiny (GB); 1988	Tender Loving Care	Final Straw
Dam Noble One (GB) 1996	Noble Destiny (GB); 1988	Tender Loving Care	Silk Stocking (Family: 10-c)
