= Zieten (horse) =

American-bred Thoroughbred racehorse

- Sire: Danzig
- Grandsire: Northern Dancer
- Dam: Blue Note
- Damsire: Habitat
- Sex: Stallion
- Foaled: 23 March 1990
- Country: United States
- Colour: Bay
- Breeder: Darley Stud
- Owner: Sheikh Mohammed; Godolphin
- Trainer: André Fabre; Hilal Ibrahim; John Gosden
- Record: 16: 6-1-2
- Earnings: £343,600

Major wins
- Prix La Flèche (1992); Prix d'Arenberg (1992); Middle Park Stakes (1992); Prix de Fontainebleau (1993); Challenge Stakes (1994)

Awards
- Timeform rating 118p (1992), 113 (1993), 118 (1994)

Zieten (foaled 23 March 1990) was an American-bred Thoroughbred racehorse and sire. Trained in France as a juvenile he was unbeaten in four races including the Prix La Flèche, Prix d'Arenberg and Middle Park Stakes. In the following year he took his unbeaten run to five in the Prix de Fontainebleau but was beaten in six subsequent races. As a four-year-old he raced in Japan and England and recorded a final big win in the Challenge Stakes. He was then retired to stud and had some success as a breeding stallion.

== Background ==
Zieten was a "small, lengthy" bay horse with a white star and white socks on his hind legs bred in Kentucky by his owner, Sheikh Mohammed's Darley Stud. The colt was imported to Europe and sent into training in France with André Fabre.

His sire Danzig, who ran only three times before his career was ended by injury, was a highly successful stallion who sired the winners of more than fifty Grade I/Group One races. His offspring include the champions Chief's Crown, Dayjur and Lure as well as the important stallion Danehill. Zieten's dam Blue Note was a top-class sprinter whose wins included the Prix de la Porte Maillot and the Prix Maurice de Gheest as a three-year-old in 1988. She was a distant descendant of the British broodmare Stained Glass (foaled 1917) who was the dam of the 1000 Guineas winner Scuttle.

== Racing career ==
=== 1992: two-year-old season ===
On his racecourse debut Zieten won the Prix Saint Crespin over 1100 metres at Evry Racecourse on 25 May. At the same track in June he was moved up to listed class for the Listed Prix La Flèche over 1200 metres and won by half a length from the filly Creaking Board. The runner-up went on to win the Starlet Stakes at Hollywood Park Racetrack in December. The colt was then stepped up to Group Three class for the Prix d'Arenberg over 1000 metres at Longchamp Racecourse on 6 September. Ridden by Steve Cauthen he was made the odds-on favourite against four female opponents headed by the Prix Yacowlef winner Wixon. After moving up to dispute the lead at half way he stayed on well in the closing stages to win by three quarters of a length from Wixon with his stablemate Ski Paradise taking third place.

For his final run of the year Zieten was sent to England and moved up to Group One class for the Middle Park Stakes over six furlongs at Newmarket Racecourse on 1 October. The Geoff Lewis-trained Silver Wizard was made the 8/13 favourite after wins in the Rose Bowl Stakes and Sirenia Stakes with Zieten, ridden by Cauthen, the 5/2 second choice in the betting. The other four runners were Pip's Pride (Phoenix Stakes), Factual, Wootton Rivers and Virilis. After settling behind the leader Pip's Pride, Zieten came under pressure a furlong out but gained the advantage in the closing stages and won by a length. After the race Cauthen said "He was a bit green and today was the first time he's had to be picked up, but once I started quickening we didn't stop. He showed so much speed that I would have my reservations about him getting a mile". His trainer André Fabre was happy with the colt's performance but indicated that Zieten was probably inferior to his stablemate Zafonic.

=== 1993: three-year-old season ===
Thierry Jarnet rode Zieten in all of his races as a three-year-old starting with the Prix de Fontainebleau over 1600 metres at Longchamp on 19 April. He was made the 1/10 favourite and won by three and a half lengths from the British challenger Semillon. Zieten was unbeaten in five races when he started the odds-on favourite for the Group One Poule d'Essai des Poulains on 9 May but sustained his first defeat as he finished eighth of the ten runners behind Kingmambo, beaten twelve lengths by the winner.

Zieten was brought back to sprint distances for his remaining five starts in 1993. Sheikh Mohammed's racing manager Athony Stroud observed "His pedigree and his style of running makes us think he's a sprinter". In the July Cup over six furlongs at Newmarket he was outpaced in the early stages before staying to finish third behind Hamas and College Chapel. At Deauville Racecourse in August he finished fifth to College Chapel in the Prix Maurice de Gheest and fourth to Monde Bleu in the Prix de Meautry. In October at Longchamp he ran fifth behind Lochsong in the Prix de l'Abbaye before ending his season by finishing third to Lavinia Fontana in Prix du Petit Couvert.

=== 1994: four-year-old season ===
In the winter of 1993/4 Zieten was transferred to Sheikh Mohammed's Godolphin organisation and entered the training stable of Hilal Ibrahim. In the spring of 1994 he was campaigned in Japan, beginning his season in the Keio Hai Spring Cup over 1400 metres at Tokyo Racecourse in April. In a race dominated by overseas challengers he finished second to Ski Paradise with the British filly Sayyedati in third. In the Yasuda Kinen in the following month he raced just behind the leaders before tiring in the closing stages and finishing unplaced behind North Flight.

On his return to Europe, Zieten joined John Gosden's Stanley House training stable in Newmarket. On his first run for his new trainer he made little impact as he finished sixth of the eight runners behind Lavinia Fontana in the Haydock Sprint Cup on 3 September. On 13 October Zieten, ridden as on his previous appearance by Frankie Dettori, contested the seven furlong Challenge Stakes at Newmarket. He was made the 13/2 third favourite behind Soviet Line and First Trump in an eight-runner field which also included Piccolo. Zieten went to the front from the start and was never headed, staying on well in the closing stages to win by one and a quarter lengths from Soviet Line. For his final race Zieten was sent to Japan for the Sprinters Stakes at Nakayama Racecourse on 18 December and finished ninth of the fourteen runners behind Sakura Bakushin O.

== Stud record ==
Zieten was retired from racing to become a breeding stallion and stood at the Haras du Logis in France. The best of his offspring included Seazun, Torgau, Ostankino (Prix Maurice de Nieuil) and Zinziberine (Critérium de Maisons-Laffitte) He began to suffer from fertility problems and was retired from stud duty in 2009.

== Pedigree ==
Pedigree of Zieten (USA), bay stallion, 1990
Sire Danzig (USA) 1977	Northern Dancer (CAN); 1961	Nearctic	Nearco
Sire Danzig (USA) 1977	Northern Dancer (CAN); 1961	Nearctic	Lady Angela
Sire Danzig (USA) 1977	Northern Dancer (CAN); 1961	Natalma	Native Dancer
Sire Danzig (USA) 1977	Northern Dancer (CAN); 1961	Natalma	Almahmoud
Sire Danzig (USA) 1977	Pas de Nom (USA); 1968	Admiral's Voyage	Crafty Admiral
Sire Danzig (USA) 1977	Pas de Nom (USA); 1968	Admiral's Voyage	Olympia Lou
Sire Danzig (USA) 1977	Pas de Nom (USA); 1968	Petitioner	Petition
Sire Danzig (USA) 1977	Pas de Nom (USA); 1968	Petitioner	Steady Aim
Dam Blue Note (FR) 1985	Habitat (USA); 1966	Sir Gaylord	Turn-To
Dam Blue Note (FR) 1985	Habitat (USA); 1966	Sir Gaylord	Somethingroyal
Dam Blue Note (FR) 1985	Habitat (USA); 1966	Little Hut	Occupy
Dam Blue Note (FR) 1985	Habitat (USA); 1966	Little Hut	Savage Beauty
Dam Blue Note (FR) 1985	Balsamique (FR); 1973	Tourangeau	Val de Loir
Dam Blue Note (FR) 1985	Balsamique (FR); 1973	Tourangeau	Torbella
Dam Blue Note (FR) 1985	Balsamique (FR); 1973	Bruyere	Traffic
Dam Blue Note (FR) 1985	Balsamique (FR); 1973	Bruyere	Becon (Family: 16)
