= Michael Seely Memorial Stakes =

Flat horse race in Britain

- Class: Listed
- Location: York Racecourse; York, England
- Race type: Flat / Thoroughbred
- Sponsor: Sky Betting & Gaming
- Website: York

Race information
- Distance: 7f 192y (1,584m)
- Surface: Turf
- Track: Right-handed
- Qualification: Three-year-old fillies* *Excluding Group 1 winners
- Weight: 9 st 2 lb Penalties; 5 lb for Group 2 or Group 3 winners 3 lb for Listed winners
- Purse: £70,000 (2025); 1st: £39,697

Michael Seely Memorial Stakes
2026
Lilt	So Regal	Botagoz

Previous years
2025
Kon Tiki	Bermuda Longtail	Troia
2024
Devoted Queen	Spiritual	Bolsena
2023
Sounds Of Heaven	Queen For You	Silver Lady
2022
Fonteyn	Grande Dame	Love Interest
2021
Primo Bacio	Creative Flair	Snow Lantern

2020-2011
2019
Magnetic Charm	Twist 'n' Shake	Glance
2018
Threading	Dance Diva	Dark Rose Angel
2017
Tomyris	On Her Toes	Sibilance
2016
Nemoralia	Aljuljalah	Thetis
2015
Sperry	Yasmeen	Realtra
2014
Lustrous	Radiator	Lady Lara
2013
Pavlosk	Senafe	Pearl Sea
2012
Laugh Out Loud	Electrelane	Hello Glory
2011
Theyskens' Theory	Sylvestris	Wrekin Sunset

2010-2005
2010
Chachamaidee	Carioca	Sweet Sonnet
2009
Nashmiah	Moonlife	Seradim
2008
Raymi Coya	Musical Bar	Festivale
2007
Silver Pivotal	Promising Lead	Graduation
2006
Short Dance	Salut d'Amour	Queen of Fire
2005
Peeress	Dumnoni	Aldora

The Michael Seely Memorial Stakes, currently ran as the Sky Bet Fillies' Stakes is a Listed flat horse race in Great Britain open to fillies aged three years only. It is run at York over a distance of 7 furlongs and 192 yards (1,584 metres), and it is scheduled to take place each year in May.

The race was first run in 2005 over 7 furlongs (1,408 metres), and was open to older horses. The current distance and age limit were introduced the following year.

The race commemorates Michael Seely, racing correspondent of The Times, who died in 1993.

== Winners ==
Year	Winner	Jockey	Trainer	Time
2005	Peeress	Michael Kinane	Sir Michael Stoute	1:27.73
2006	Short Dance	Richard Hughes	Barry Hills	1:44.73
2007	Silver Pivotal	Nicky Mackay	Gerard Butler	1:40.86
2008	Raymi Coya	Kerrin McEvoy	Marco Botti	1:39.83
2009	Nashmiah	Ryan Moore	Clive Brittain	1:43.46
2010	Chachamaidee	Tom Queally	Henry Cecil	1:37.68
2011	Theyskens' Theory	Martin Dwyer	Brian Meehan	1:38.14
2012	Laugh Out Loud	William Buick	Mick Channon	1:40.13
2013	Pavlosk	Ryan Moore	Sir Michael Stoute	1:42.40
2014	Lustrous	Andrea Atzeni	Richard Hannon Jr.	1:37.61
2015	Sperry	James Doyle	John Gosden	1:39.00
2016	Nemoralia	Frankie Dettori	Jeremy Noseda	1:37.71
2017	Tomyris	Andrea Atzeni	Roger Varian	1:41.01
2018	Threading	William Buick	Mark Johnston	1:38.82
2019	Magnetic Charm	James Doyle	William Haggas	1:38.80
	no race 2020 (Note: The 2020 running was cancelled because of the COVID-19 pandemic in the United Kingdom)
2021	Primo Bacio	Andrea Atzeni	Ed Walker	1:38.27
2022	Fonteyn	Andrea Atzeni	Kevin Ryan	1:37.15
2023	Sounds of Heaven	Ronan Whelan	Jessica Harrington	1:37.50
2025	Kon Tiki	David Egan	Jane Chapple-Hyam	1:39.35
2026	Lilt	Tom Marquand	William Haggas	1:39.78

== See also ==
- Horse racing in Great Britain
- List of British flat horse races
