= Connaught (horse) =

British-bred Thoroughbred racehorse

- Sire: St. Paddy
- Grandsire: Aureole
- Dam: Nagaika
- Damsire: Goyama
- Sex: Stallion
- Foaled: 1965
- Country: Ireland
- Colour: Bay
- Breeder: Jim Joel
- Owner: Jim Joel
- Trainer: Noel Murless
- Record: 16: 7-3-2
- Earnings: £69,212

Major wins
- King Edward VII Stakes (1968); Great Voltigeur Stakes (1968); Coronation Stakes (1969); Prince of Wales's Stakes (1969, 1970); Westbury Stakes (1970); Eclipse Stakes (1970)

Awards
- Timeform rating: 130
- Last updated on 13 May 2022

Connaught (1965–1987) was a British Thoroughbred racehorse and sire. Noted for his difficult temperament and front-running style, he won seven of his sixteen races in a track career which lasted from October 1967 to July 1970. Owned and bred by Jim Joel, he was trained by Noel Murless and ridden in most of his races by Sandy Barclay.

As a two-year-old he showed great promise at home but refused to enter the starting stalls on his scheduled debut before finishing fifth in the Observer Gold Cup. In 1968 he ran poorly in the 2000 Guineas but proved himself a top-class colt by running second to Sir Ivor in The Derby after looking likely to win entering the final furlong. Later that year he won the King Edward VII Stakes and Great Voltigeur Stakes but ran badly when favourite for the St Leger Stakes. As a four-year-old he won the Brigadier Gerard Stakes, Coronation Stakes and Prince of Wales's Stakes in the first half of the season before succumbing to a respiratory infection. At five he was unbeaten in three races, taking the Westbury Stakes and a second Prince of Wales's Stakes before ending his racing career with a win in the Eclipse Stakes.

After his retirement from racing he had steady success as a breeding stallion. He died in 1987.

== Background ==
Connaught was a "big, burly, immensely powerful" bay horse with a white blaze and white socks on his hind legs bred in the United Kingdom by his owner Jim Joel. He was sired by St. Paddy the winner of The Derby and St. Leger Stakes in 1960. His dam Nagaika won the Solario Stakes as a two-year-old in 1956 and was bought by Joel a year later. As a broodmare she had already produced Court Sentence, who won the St James's Palace Stakes in 1962. Nagaika was the great-granddaughter of Neomenie, a mare whose other descendants included the Prix de l'Arc de Triomphe winner Nikellora.

The colt was sent into training with Noel Murless at his Warren Place Stable in Newmarket, Suffolk. Murless had been British flat racing Champion Trainer on five occasions before taking charge of Connaught and went on to win the four more championships. The horse was ridden in all of his major races by the young Scottish jockey Sandy Barclay who had been Champion Apprentice in 1966, before becoming Murless's stable jockey in 1968.

== Racing career ==
=== 1967: two-year-old season ===
Connaught built up a big reputation in training gallops but his first racecourse appearance a complete failure. He was scheduled to make his debut in the Convivial Maiden Stakes at York Racecourse in August 1967 but refused to enter the starting stalls and was withdrawn from the race. In October he was entered in the Observer Gold Cup at Doncaster Racecourse (the most valuable event for two-year-olds run in Britain) and finished fifth behind Vaguely Noble.

=== 1968: three-year-old season ===
Connaught made good progress in the winter of 1967/1968 and was expected to run well in his seasonal debut in the Greenham Stakes but again refused to enter the stalls and did not take part. Despite his temperamental problems he was well backed for the 2000 Guineas and started at odds of 13/2 but after showing good speed in the early stages he faded to finish ninth of the ten runners behind Sir Ivor. When moved up in distance for the Chester Vase over one and a half miles he showed better form when finishing second to Remand.

At Epsom Downs Racecourse he started at odds of 100/9 for the 189th running of the Derby Stakes, for which Sir Ivor started 4/5 favourite in a field of thirteen colts. Attempting to become the first maiden to win the race since Merry Hampton in 1887, Connaught was positioned in second by Barclay before taking the lead at half way. In the straight, the colt opened up a clear lead over his opponents and looked certain to win before Lester Piggott produced Sir Ivor with a late run on the outside. Connaught was overtaken well inside the final furlong and finished second, beaten one and a half lengths. Commenting on the race more than forty years later, Barclay said "The Derby on Connaught was a shattering, bone-crushing moment but, to finish so close, still opened a lot of doors for a 20-year-old. Riding at Epsom like that was a childhood dream and within sight of the post I'd won the Derby. I'm thinking to myself: `dreams must come true after all' and then all of a sudden this thing flies past me as if I was in a different race". At Royal Ascot, later in June he started the 1/2 favourite for the King Edward VII Stakes and recorded his first win, beating Ribero by twelve lengths. He was scheduled to run in the Gordon Stakes at Goodwood Racecourse in July but broke away from his handler, galloped away and was subsequently withdrawn from the race.

Connaught appeared to be short of full fitness when reappearing in the Great Voltigeur Stakes at York Racecourse in August but was nevertheless made the 1/3 favourite. After being held up by Barclay in the early stages he was beaten a neck by Riboccare in a rough finish, but was awarded the race after an inquiry by the racecourse stewards. In September, Connaught started 10/11 favourite for the 192nd running of the St Leger Stakes at Doncaster. Racing on heavy ground, he failed to reproduce his best form and finished fifth of the eight runners behind Ribero. After the race, Barclay commented that "the ground did not suit him at all".

=== 1969: four-year-old season ===
On his first appearance as a four-year-old Connaught started the 6/5 favourite for the Coronation Stakes (now the Brigadier Gerard Stakes) over ten furlongs at Sandown Park Racecourse in May and won by six lengths from Jimmy Reppin, who finished lame. A year after his run in the Derby, Connaught returned to Epsom for the Coronation Cup over the same course and distance. He started favourite, but after taking the lead at half way he faded in the closing stages and finished third behind Park Top and Mount Athos. He never raced over one and a half miles again, with Murless being convinced that he did not stay the distance. At Royal Ascot he started 11/10 favourite for the ten furlong Prince of Wales's Stakes and won by five lengths from Wolver Hollow, breaking the track record by four seconds. The colt then developed a respiratory infection and was off the course for three months.

Connaught returned in the Scarborough Stakes over ten furlongs at Doncaster in September. His temperamental problems resurfaced as he was very reluctant to leave the pre-race paddock before finishing third to Karabas and Hotfoot. Later that month he was dropped down in distance to a mile and finished second to Jimmy Reppin in the Queen Elizabeth II Stakes. On his final appearance of the year he ran poorly when finishing sixth to Flossy in the Champion Stakes.

=== 1970: five-year-old season ===
Connaught began his fourth season by winning the Westbury Stakes (now the Gordon Richards Stakes) at Sandown in May at odds of 1/2 in "most convincing" style from Royal Rocket. In June he attempted repeat his 1969 success the Prince of Wales's for a second time. Starting the 10/11 favourite, he won by four lengths from Hotfoot and broke his own course record. In the Eclipse Stakes he started at odds of 5/4 against two opponents; Karabas and Nor. He delayed the race for some time as he was once again very reluctant to enter the stalls, and then almost unseated Barclay when swerving at the start. He soon recovered, took the lead after a furlong and never looked in danger of defeat, winning by two and a half lengths from Karabas. His winning time established a new course record, bettering the mark set by his sire St Paddy in 1961.

== Assessment ==
Connaught was given a peak Timeform rating of 130 in 1970.

== Stud record ==
Connaught was retired from racing to become a breeding stallion and produced a steady stream of stakes winners before being pensioned from stud duty in the mid 1980s. He died in 1987 at the age of twenty-two.

Connaught's best winners included;

- Sauceboat (1972), won Child Stakes
- Sir Montagu (1973), won Ebor Handicap
- Connaught Ranger (1974), won Triumph Hurdle, Ascot Hurdle
- Miss Pinkie (1974), won Fillies' Mile
- Centurion (1975), won Cesarewitch Handicap
- Remainder Man (1975), won Ormonde Stakes, second 2000 Guineas, third Derby sire of One Man
- Connaught Bridge (1976), won Yorkshire Oaks, Nassau Stakes
- La Dolce (1976), dam of Pebbles
- Dukedom (1977), won White Rose Stakes
- Playboy Jubilee (1977), won Dee Stakes
- Buffavento (1978), won Grosser Preis von Dortmund
- Clare Island (1979), won Princess Elizabeth Stakes
- Lirung (1982), won Prix Jacques Le Marois

== Sire line tree ==
- Connaught
  - Sir Montagu
  - Connaught Ranger
  - Centurion
  - Remainderman
    - One Man
  - Dukedom
  - Playboy Jubilee
  - Buffavento
  - Lirung

== Pedigree ==
Pedigree of Connaught, bay stallion, 1965
Sire St. Paddy (GB) 1957	Aureole (GB); 1950	Hyperion	Gainsborough
Sire St. Paddy (GB) 1957	Aureole (GB); 1950	Hyperion	Selene
Sire St. Paddy (GB) 1957	Aureole (GB); 1950	Angelola	Donatello
Sire St. Paddy (GB) 1957	Aureole (GB); 1950	Angelola	Feola
Sire St. Paddy (GB) 1957	Edie Kelly (GB); 1950	Bois Roussel	Vatout
Sire St. Paddy (GB) 1957	Edie Kelly (GB); 1950	Bois Roussel	Plucky Liege
Sire St. Paddy (GB) 1957	Edie Kelly (GB); 1950	Caerlissa	Caerleon
Sire St. Paddy (GB) 1957	Edie Kelly (GB); 1950	Caerlissa	Sister Sarah
Dam Nagaika (FR) 1954	Goyama (FR); 1943	Goya	Tourbillon*
Dam Nagaika (FR) 1954	Goyama (FR); 1943	Goya	Zariba
Dam Nagaika (FR) 1954	Goyama (FR); 1943	Devineress	Finglas
Dam Nagaika (FR) 1954	Goyama (FR); 1943	Devineress	Devachon
Dam Nagaika (FR) 1954	Naim (FR); 1946	Amfortas	Ksar*
Dam Nagaika (FR) 1954	Naim (FR); 1946	Amfortas	Persephone
Dam Nagaika (FR) 1954	Naim (FR); 1946	Nacelle	Cerfeuil
Dam Nagaika (FR) 1954	Naim (FR); 1946	Nacelle	Neomenie (Family:4-h)

* Connaught is inbred 5D x 4D to the stallion Ksar, meaning that he appears fifth generation (via Tourbillon) and fourth generation on the dam side of his pedigree.
