= Prix d'Arenberg =

- Class: Group 3
- Location: Chantilly Racecourse; Chantilly, France
- Inaugurated: 1911
- Race type: Flat / Thoroughbred
- Website: france-galop.com

Race information
- Distance: 1,100 metres (5½f)
- Surface: Turf
- Track: Straight
- Qualification: Two-year-olds excluding Group 1 winners
- Weight: 56 kg Allowances; 1½ kg for fillies Penalties; 2½ kg for Group 2 winners 2½ kg if two Group 3 wins 1½ kg if one Group 3 win
- Purse: €80,000 (2016); 1st: €40,000

Prix d'Arenberg
2025
Afjan	Havana Anna	Shine On Me

Previous years
2024
Aesterius	Kaadi	Treasure Isle
2023
Tiger Belle	Dawn Charger	Graceful Thunder
2022
Lady Hollywood	Vicious Harry	Kerindia
2021
Corazon	Dizzy Bizu	Illustrating

2020-2011
2020
Kalahara	Wink	Livachope
2019
Al Raya	Divine Spirit	Flaming Princess
2018
Soldier's Call	Queen Of Bermuda	Kilfrush Memories
2017
Rimini	Sound And Silence	Over Reacted
2016
Afandem	Hargeisa	Barroche
2015
Yakaba	Lil's Joy	Noce
2014
High Celebrity	City Money	Souvenir Delondres
2013
This Time	Another Party	Haikbidiac
2012
California Bounty	Baileys Jubilee	Aksil
2011
Restiadargent	Kendam	Calahorra

2010-2001
2010
Broox	Chinese Wall	Boccalino
2009
Sorciere	Dolled Up	Kelty In Love
2008
Triple Aspect	Thunderous Mood	Treasure
2007
Starlit Sands	Wilki	Galaktea
2006
Beauty Is Truth	Iron Lips	Beta
2005
Headache	Sweet Travel	Lady Angele
2004
Toupie	Crossover	Salut Thomas
2003
Villadolide	Needles And Pins	Peak To Creek
2002
Pleasure Place	Zinziberine	Traou Mad
2001
Dobby Road	Porlezza	Prince Cyrano

2000-1990
2000
Iron Mask	Season's Greetings	Racina
1999
Moon Driver	Harbour Island	Mall Queen
1997
Starkey	Shudder	River Flare
1996
Pas De Reponse	Heaven's Command	Ballade Viennoise
1995
Ella Nico	Branston Jewel	Shining Molly
1994
Doree	Park Rapids	Sea Thunder
1993
Key Of Luck	Eagle Eyed	Caslon
1992
Zieten	Wixon	Ski Paradise
1991
Regal Scintilla	Stormagain	Secret Talent
1990
Divine Danse	Polemic	Hunter Gleam

The Prix d'Arenberg is a Group 3 flat horse race in France open to two-year-old thoroughbreds. It is run at Chantilly over a distance of 1,100 metres (about 5½ furlongs), and it is scheduled to take place each year in late August or early September.

== History ==
The event was established in 1911, and it was originally called the Prix des Coteaux. It was initially contested over 1,100 metres at Longchamp. It was abandoned throughout World War I, with no running from 1914 to 1919. It was shortened to 1,000 metres in 1921.

The race was renamed in memory of Auguste d'Arenberg (1837–1924), a long-serving member of the Société d'Encouragement, in 1925.

The Prix d'Arenberg was cancelled once during World War II, in 1939. It was run at Auteuil over 900 metres in 1940, Maisons-Laffitte in 1943 and Le Tremblay in 1944.

The event was transferred to Chantilly in 1975, and it returned to Longchamp in 1983. It was extended to 1,100 metres in 1994, and from this point its venue frequently changed. For brief spells it was held at Maisons-Laffitte (1994, 2002–03), Chantilly (1995, 1997, 1999–2001) and Évry (1996). It was cancelled because of budget cuts in 1998.

The Prix d'Arenberg moved back to Chantilly in 2004. It was staged at Maisons-Laffitte in 2010 and 2011 and Longchamp in 2015 over the shorter distance of 5 furlongs.

== Records ==
Leading jockey (6 wins):

- Yves Saint-Martin – Texanita (1963), Farhana (1966), Zeddaan (1967), Hawkins (1977), Adraan (1979), Last Tycoon (1985)
- Freddy Head – Enitram (1972), Sigy (1978), Greenway (1980), Sicyos (1983), Doree (1994) Pas de Reponse (1996)

Leading trainer (9 wins):

- Criquette Head-Maarek – Sigy (1978), Sicyos (1983), Ravinella (1987), Divine Danse (1990), Key of Luck (1993), Doree (1994), Pas de Reponse (1996), Iron Mask (2000), Villadolide (2003)

Leading owner (5 wins):

- Marcel Boussac – Xander (1927), Djerba (1946, dead-heat), Damnos (1947), Cardanil (1949), Djelfa (1950)

== Winners since 1979 ==
Year	Winner	Jockey	Trainer	Owner	Time
1979	Adraan	Yves Saint-Martin	François Mathet	HH Aga Khan IV
1980	Greenway	Freddy Head	Alec Head	Jacques Wertheimer
1981	Glancing	Lester Piggott	William Hastings-Bass	Mrs Dare Wigan
1982	Go Jogging	Maurice Philipperon	John Cunnington, Jr.	Jacques Wimpfheimer
1983	Sicyos	Freddy Head	Criquette Head	Haras d'Etreham
1984	Reasonable	Cash Asmussen	Pascal Bary	Peter Goulandris
1985	Last Tycoon	Yves Saint-Martin	Robert Collet	Richard Strauss	0:57.40
1986	Indian Forest	Cash Asmussen	Georges Mikhalidès	Mahmoud Fustok
1987	Ravinella	Gary W. Moore	Criquette Head	Ecurie Aland
1988	Desert Dawn	Gary W. Moore	Lord John FitzGerald	Khaled Al Ahmed	0:59.70
1989	Repercutionist	Tony Cruz	Alain Falourd	John Kluge
1990	Divine Danse	Guy Guignard	Criquette Head	Ecurie Aland	0:57.40
1991	Regal Scintilla	Guy Guignard	Toby Balding	Theodore Waddington	0:57.70
1992	Zieten	Steve Cauthen	André Fabre	Sheikh Mohammed	0:58.90
1993	Key of Luck	Walter Swinburn	Criquette Head	Maktoum Al Maktoum	0:57.90
1994	Doree	Freddy Head	Criquette Head	Khalid Abdullah	1:04.70
1995	Ella Nico ^{[a]}	Olivier Doleuze	Nicolas Clément	Ecurie Biraben	1:05.80
1996	Pas de Reponse	Freddy Head	Criquette Head	Wertheimer et Frère	1:05.06
1997	Starkey	Kevin Woodburn	Bruce Hellier	Spiess / Wilde	1:05.90
1998	no race
1999	Moon Driver	Sylvain Guillot	Jonathan Pease	Niarchos Family	1:04.50
2000	Iron Mask	Olivier Doleuze	Criquette Head	Wertheimer et Frère	1:02.90
2001	Dobby Road	Alain Junk	Valérie Dissaux	Hillbrow Breeding Ltd	1:06.60
2002	Pleasure Place	Thierry Jarnet	Riccardo Menichetti	Razza dell'Olmo	1:05.90
2003	Villadolide	Thierry Gillet	Criquette Head-Maarek	Ghislaine Head	1:06.10
2004	Toupie	Jean-Bernard Eyquem	François Rohaut	Javier Gispert	1:02.90
2005	Headache	Sébastien Maillot	Robert Collet	Robert Collet	1:03.50
2006	Beauty Is Truth	Thierry Thulliez	Robert Collet	Richard Strauss	1:03.80
2007	Starlit Sands	Jean-Bernard Eyquem	Sir Mark Prescott	Kirsten Rausing	1:02.20
2008	Triple Aspect	Liam Jones	William Haggas	Margaret Findlay	1:04.10
2009	Sorciere	Gérald Mossé	Carlos Lerner	Lady O'Reilly	1:05.80
2010	Broox	Olivier Peslier	Eoghan O'Neill	Lucas / Marsh	1:03.60
2011	Restiadargent	Maxime Guyon	Henri-Alex Pantall	Guy Pariente	1:06.20
2012	Cay Verde	Martin Harley	Mick Channon	Qatar Racing Ltd	1:05.22
2013	This Time	Fabrice Veron	Henri-Alex Pantall	Antoinette Tamagni	1:04.99
2014	High Celebrity	Maxime Guyon	André Fabre	Ecurie Victoria Dreams	1:03.10
2015	Yakaba	Maxime Guyon	Freddy Head	Wertheimer et Frère	0:55.93
2016	Afandem	James Doyle	Hugo Palmer	Hamad Rashed Bin Ghedayer	0:57.95
2017	Rimini	Julien Auge	Christophe Ferland	LG Bloodstock	0:58.26
2018	Soldier's Call	Daniel Tudhope	Archie Watson	Clipper Logistics	0:56.76
2019	Al Raya	Pierre-Charles Boudot	Simon Crisford	Nasser bin Hamad Al Khalifa	0:58.47
2020	Kalahara ^{[b]}	Maxime Guyon	Christophe Ferland	Wertheimer et Frère	0:55.84
2021	Corazon	Mickael Barzalona	George Boughey	Nick Bradley Racing 44 & Partner	0:57.36
2022	Lady Hollywood	Mickael Barzalona	Alice Haynes	Amo Racing & Omnihorse Racing	0:55.81
2026	Drazinda	Mickael Barzalona	Francis-Henri Graffard	Zahra Aga Khan	0:55.95

^{a} Titus Livius finished first in 1995, but he was subsequently disqualified after testing positive for a banned substance.
^{b} The 2020 running took place at Longchamp due to the COVID-19 pandemic

== Earlier winners ==
- 1911: Joseline
- 1912: Ecouen
- 1913: Roselys
- 1914–19: no race
- 1920: Phusla
- 1921: Tahaa
- 1922: Epinard
- 1923: Heldifann
- 1924: Sherry
- 1925: Highborn II
- 1926: Licteur
- 1927: Xander
- 1928: La Fayette
- 1929: Aude
- 1930: Dogaresse
- 1931: Timadora
- 1932: Spirituelle
- 1933: Shining Tor
- 1934: Bao Dai
- 1935: Mistress Ford
- 1936: Ethiopie
- 1937: Shrew
- 1938: Emir d'Iran
- 1939: no race
- 1940: La Peri
- 1941: Nugget
- 1942: Fanatique
- 1943: La Rayonne
- 1944: Doge
- 1945: Sayani
- 1946: Djerba / Le Lavandou ^{1}
- 1947: Damnos
- 1948:
- 1949: Cardanil
- 1950: Djelfa
- 1951: Pomare
- 1952: Kobus
- 1953: Vamarie
- 1954: Reinata
- 1955: Polic
- 1956: Skindles Hotel
- 1957: Texana
- 1958: Ginetta
- 1959: Barbaresque
- 1960: L'Epinay
- 1961: Sturdy Man
- 1962: Victorian Order
- 1963: Texanita
- 1964: Polyfoto
- 1965: Fantastic Light
- 1966: Farhana
- 1967: Zeddaan
- 1968: Don II
- 1969: Mange Tout
- 1970: Anna Karenina
- 1971: Deep Diver
- 1972: Enitram
- 1973: La Lambarde
- 1974: Raise a Lady
- 1975: Diffusion
- 1976: Black Sulphur ^{2}
- 1977: Hawkins
- 1978: Sigy

^{1} The 1946 race was a dead-heat and has joint winners.
^{2} Haneena finished first in 1976, but she was relegated to second place following a stewards' inquiry.

== See also ==
- List of French flat horse races
- Recurring sporting events established in 1911 – this race is included under its original title, Prix des Coteaux.
