= Primo Dominie =

British-bred Thoroughbred and sire (1982–2008)

- Sire: Dominion
- Grandsire: Derring-Do
- Dam: Swan Ann
- Damsire: My Swanee
- Sex: Stallion
- Foaled: 15 April 1982
- Country: Great Britain
- Colour: Bay
- Breeder: A.R. Jones Morgan
- Owner: Peter Wetzel
- Trainer: Brian Swift, Michael Stoute
- Record: 16: 6–4–0
- Earnings: $276,045

Major wins
- Coventry Stakes (1984); July Stakes (1984); Richmond Stakes (1984); King George Stakes (1985); Timeform rating: 121
- Last updated on 23 September 2025

Primo Dominie (15 April 1982 – 4 September 2008) was a high-class Thoroughbred sprinter and successful sire. He raced 16 times, winning six races and being placed on four occasions. As a two-year-old in 1984 he won three Group races: the Coventry Stakes at Royal Ascot, the July Stakes and the Richmond Stakes. Primo Dominie ended that season with a third-place finish in the Middle Park Stakes. Aged three the colt won the Group Three King George Stakes, finished second in four leading sprint races and fourth in two other Group contests. He was trained for the majority of his career by Brian Swift and ridden by jockey John Reid before moving to Michael Stoute's stable in the latter part of 1985.

The colt stood at Cheveley Park Stud and was a great success as a sire, with his offspring often inheriting his speed. Notable progeny include Premio Roma winner Imperial Dancer, First Trump, Halland Park Girl, Millyant and Primo Valentino. He also left his mark as an excellent broodmare sire: his daughter Balladonia produced the Group One winner and excellent stallion Wootton Bassett, while Noble One gave birth to another Group One winner, the filly Peeress. Primo Dominie was available for breeding in France from 1987 until 2001. His stud fee in 2002 was £7,000. The horse died on 4 September 2008.
