= Torgau (horse) =

Thoroughbred racehorse

- Sire: Zieten
- Grandsire: Danzig
- Dam: Snoozy Time
- Damsire: Cavo Doro
- Sex: Mare
- Foaled: 15 January 1997
- Country: Ireland
- Colour: Bay
- Breeder: B Kennedy
- Owner: The TT Partnership; Team Valor & Heiligbrodt Racing Stable
- Trainer: Giles Bravery; Jenine Sahadi
- Record: 7: 2-2-0
- Earnings: £85,481

Major wins
- Cherry Hinton Stakes (1999)

Awards
- Cartier Champion Two-year-old Filly
- Last updated on June 22, 2007

Torgau (foaled 1997) was an Irish-bred, British-trained champion Thoroughbred racehorse. As a two-year-old in 1999 she won the Group Two Cherry Hinton Stakes and finished second in the Group One Moyglare Stud Stakes and the Group One Cheveley Park Stakes. At the time of her success, her trainer, Giles Bravery had only nine horses in his stable. Torgau was named European Champion Two-year-old Filly of 1999 at the Cartier Racing Awards. She was retired after two unsuccessful runs as a three-year-old.

== Background ==
Torgau was sired by the Middle Park Stakes winner Zieten out of the mare Snoozy Time. Zieten was not a notable success as a stallion although he had an excellent first season and has been described as "a good source of fast two-year-olds". Snoozy Time, a daughter of The Derby runner-up Cavo Doro, won a minor race and was a half-sister to the successful sprinter Grey Desire (Duke of York Stakes). Apart from Torgau, her most notable performer was Fujiyama Crest, who provided Frankie Dettori with the last of his seven winners on Champions' Day at Ascot in 1996. Torgau is inbred 4x4 to Sir Gaylord (see below).

Torgau was sent to the sales as a foal in November 1997, when she was sold for 13,000 guineas to the bloodstock agent Paul Thorman. A year later Thorman sold her for the same price at the Tattersalls October sales. She was sent into training with Giles Bravery at his Revida Place stable at Newmarket, Suffolk.

== Racing career ==
=== 1997: two-year-old season ===
Torgau began her career at Catterick in a maiden race in June 1999. She started a 14/1 outsider in a six-horse field, but after being behind in the early stages, she was brought through to take the lead by Kevin Darley and won by two lengths from the favourite Littlefeather. Giles Bravery said after the race that Torgau was his best two-year-old and would be sent to Royal Ascot.

At the Royal meeting two weeks later, Torgau was sent off at odds of 25/1 for the Group Three Queen Mary Stakes. She finished sixth, after starting slowly, but finished less than two and a half lengths behind the winner, Shining Hour. Despite her defeat, she was stepped up in class again for her next start in the Cherry Hinton Stakes at the July Meeting at Newmarket in which she was ridden by Gary Stevens. New tactics were employed, with Torgau sent into the lead from the start. She was never headed, and ran on strongly to win by one and a quarter lengths from the favourite, Hoh Dear. After the race Bravery spoke at length about the problems of smaller trainers, explaining that he had thirty-one empty boxes at his forty box stable, and saying that, from a financial point of view, training racehorses was "unbelievably idiotic." Stevens was pleased with the filly, commenting that Torgau was "just enjoying herself out there."

Torgau was then moved up to the highest level when she was sent to Ireland for the Group One Moyglare Stud Stakes at the Curragh. Her rivals included Littlefeather, who had won all three of her starts since the Catterick race, the unbeaten Preseli and the Aidan O'Brien-trained Amethyst. Torgau disputed the lead in the early stages and went into a clear lead a furlong from the finish but was caught close home and beaten three quarters of a length by Preseli. Torgau's final start of the season came in the Cheveley Park Stakes at Newmarket, one of the two Group One races for two-year-old fillies in England. Once again, Torgau was sent into the lead from the start by her jockey Michael Hills. In the final furlong she was overtaken by the Mick Channon-trained Seazun, and although she ran on under pressure, she was beaten by a head.

Before her run at Newmarket, Torgau had been sold to American interests, with the intention of racing her in the United States, but in fact she stayed at Newmarket to be prepared for the following year's 1000 Guineas.

=== 1998: three-year-old season ===
On her three-year-old debut, Torgau was sent straight for the 1000 Guineas at Newmarket. Bravery did not run her in a trial as she "took a long time to get rid of her winter coat." Despite her status as champion two-year-old, she was a 25/1 outsider, probably because both her breeding and racing style suggested that the one mile distance was likely to be too far- Bravery had said that "six furlongs is definitely her best trip". She tracked the leaders, but could make no impression in the closing stages and finished seventh of the eighteen runners behind Lahan.

Torgau was then sent to the United States and joined the stable of Jenine Sahadi. On her first American start she finished last in the Grade II Honeymoon Handicap at Hollywood Park.

She was retired soon afterwards and sent to Keeneland where she was sold for a reported $900,000.

== Race record ==
Date	Race	Dist (f)	Course	Class	Prize (£K)	Odds	Runners	Placing	Margin	Time	Jockey	Trainer
4 June 1999	EBF Novice Stakes	5	Catterick	M	3	14/1	6	1	2.5	1:00.10	Kevin Darley	Giles Bravery
16 June 1999	Queen Mary Stakes	5	Ascot	3	32	25/1	13	6	2.5	1:01.83	Michael Hills	Giles Bravery
6 July 1999	Cherry Hinton Stakes	6	Newmarket July	2	22	12/1	12	1	1.25	1:11.77	Gary Stevens	Giles Bravery
5 September 1999	Moyglare Stud Stakes	7	The Curragh	1	87	5/1	12	2	0.75	1:24.20	Michael Hills	Giles Bravery
28 September 1999	Cheveley Park Stakes	6	Newmarket- Rowley	1	78	11/2	14	2	head	1:12.92	Michael Hills	Giles Bravery
7 May 2000	1000 Guineas	8	Newmarket Rowley	1	145	25/1	18	7	7	1:36.38	Olivier Peslier	Giles Bravery
28 May 2000	Honeymoon Handicap	9	Hollywood	2				last		1:48.05	Chris McCarron	Jenine Sahahdi

== Assessment ==
In the International Classification for two-year-old fillies, Torgau was rated on 111, making her the eighth-best filly of her generation in Europe, two pounds below the top-weights Goldamix, Lady of Chad and Preseli. The senior handicapper, Geoffrey Gibbs described the fillies of 1999 as a "particularly disappointing" group.

Torgau was named European Champion Two-year-old Filly of 1999 at the Cartier Racing Awards.

== Stud career ==
Several of Torgau's foals have reached the racecourse and at least two of them, Knapton Hill and Timur Danon have won, but none of her offspring have been top class. In November 2006 she was sold at Tattersalls for 58,000 gns to David Redvers Bloodstock.

== Pedigree ==
Pedigree of Torgau (IRE), bay mare, 1997
Sire Zieten (USA) 1990	Danzig; 1977	Northern Dancer	Nearctic
Sire Zieten (USA) 1990	Danzig; 1977	Northern Dancer	Natalma
Sire Zieten (USA) 1990	Danzig; 1977	Pas De Nom	Admiral's Voyage
Sire Zieten (USA) 1990	Danzig; 1977	Pas De Nom	Petitioner
Sire Zieten (USA) 1990	Blue Note; 1985	Habitat	Sir Gaylord*
Sire Zieten (USA) 1990	Blue Note; 1985	Habitat	Little Hut
Sire Zieten (USA) 1990	Blue Note; 1985	Balsamique	Tourangeau
Sire Zieten (USA) 1990	Blue Note; 1985	Balsamique	Bruyere
Dam Snoozy Time (GB) 1978	Cavo Doro; 1969	Sir Ivor	Sir Gaylord*
Dam Snoozy Time (GB) 1978	Cavo Doro; 1969	Sir Ivor	Attica
Dam Snoozy Time (GB) 1978	Cavo Doro; 1969	Limuru	Alcide
Dam Snoozy Time (GB) 1978	Cavo Doro; 1969	Limuru	Princess Cecilia
Dam Snoozy Time (GB) 1978	Helvetie; 1970	Gratitude	Golden Cloud
Dam Snoozy Time (GB) 1978	Helvetie; 1970	Gratitude	Verdura
Dam Snoozy Time (GB) 1978	Helvetie; 1970	Siesta Time	Ommeyad
Dam Snoozy Time (GB) 1978	Helvetie; 1970	Siesta Time	Time Call (family 5-e)

- Torgau is inbred 4x4 to Sir Gaylord. This means that the stallion appears twice in the fourth generation of her pedigree.
