= Grosser Preis der Wirtschaft =

Dortmund Grand Prix
- Class: Group 3
- Location: Dortmund Racecourse; Dortmund, Germany
- Inaugurated: 1968
- Race type: Flat / Thoroughbred
- Website: Dortmund

Race information
- Distance: 1,750 metres (1⅛ miles)
- Surface: Turf
- Track: Right-handed
- Qualification: Three-years-old and up
- Weight: 53 kg (3yo); 58½ kg (4y+); Allowances; 1½ kg for fillies and mares 1 kg if not won €12,000 (4y+) * Penalties; 3 kg for Group 1 winners * 2 kg for Group 2 winners * 1 kg for Group 3 winners * * since July 1 last year
- Purse: €55,000 (2019); 1st: €32,000

The Dortmund Grand Prix (formerly known as Grosser Preis der Wirtschaft) is a Group 3 flat horse race in Germany open to thoroughbreds aged three years or older. It is run at Dortmund over a distance of 2,000 metres (about 1¼ miles), and it is scheduled to take place each year in June.

== History ==
The event was established in 1968, and it was originally called the Grosser Preis von Dortmund. It was initially contested over 2,200 metres. Its distance was frequently modified during the 1970s.

The race began a period over 1,800 metres in 1981, and a new length of 1,750 metres was introduced in 1998. It was extended to 2,000 metres in 2008 but return to 1,750 meters in 2013

== Records ==
Most successful horse (3 wins):

- Best Lightning - 2023, 2025, 2026

Leading jockey (9 wins):

- Andrasch Starke – Devil River Peek (1996), War Blade (2003), Lord of England (2006), Soldier Hollow (2007), Norderney (2010), Elle Shadow (2011), All Shamar (2012), Neatico (2013), Liberty London (2021)

Leading trainer (6 wins):

- Heinz Jentzsch – Priamos (1968), Sarto (1972), Experte (1973), Honduras (1974), Aguarico (1986), Zampano (1989)

== Winners ==
Year	Winner	Age	Jockey	Trainer	Time
1968	Priamos	4	Fritz Drechsler	Heinz Jentzsch	2:23.60
1969	Cortez	4	Oskar Langner	Sven von Mitzlaff	2:19.00
1970	Tajo	5	Johannes Starosta	Heinz Gummelt	2:33.90
1971	Golfstrom	4	J. Gutkäss	Hein Bollow	2:40.80
1972	Sarto	4	Fritz Drechsler	Heinz Jentzsch	2:31.40
1973	Experte	4	Fritz Drechsler	Heinz Jentzsch	1:47.90
1974	Honduras	4	Fritz Drechsler	Heinz Jentzsch	1:52.40
1975	Wladimir	3	Horst Horwart	Robert Backes	1:50.50
1976	Wladimir	4	Erwin Schindler	Robert Backes	1:51.20
1977	Tuttlinger	4	Lutz Mäder	Arthur-Paul Schlaefke	2:28.30
1978	La Tour	4	Peter Alafi	Sven von Mitzlaff	2:27.90
1979	Pawiment	5	Peter Remmert	Theo Grieper	2:26.70
1980	Nebos	4	Lutz Mäder	Hein Bollow	2:29.80
1981	Strong Gale	6	Peter Remmert	Theo Grieper	1:46.90
1982	Buffavento	4	Willie Carson	Gavin Pritchard-Gordon	1:52.20
1983	Kebir	4	Greville Starkey	Patrick Biancone	1:46.30
1984	Gilmore	4	Peter Remmert	Sven von Mitzlaff	1:50.50
1985	Solarstern	6	Peter Remmert	Hein Bollow	1:49.90
1986	Aguarico	4	Horst Horwart	Heinz Jentzsch	1:44.90
1987	Kamiros	5	Peter Alafi	Harro Remmert	1:52.20
1988	Kamiros	6	Peter Alafi	Harro Remmert	1:47.40
1989	Zampano	5	Andrzej Tylicki	Heinz Jentzsch	1:46.40
1990	Sir Felix	4	Alain Lequeux	Mario Hofer	1:48.70
1991	Turfkönig	5	Georg Bocskai	Uwe Ostmann	1:48.90
1992	Iron Fighter	3	Andrew Riding	Horst Steinmetz	1:47.00
1993	Karinga Bay	6	Brian Rouse	Gary L. Moore	1:46.70
1994	Prince Firebird	3	Andreas Boschert	Andreas Wöhler	1:46.30
1995	Ladoni	3	Kevin Woodburn	Harro Remmert	1:52.60
1996	Devil River Peek	4	Andrasch Starke	Bruno Schütz	1:42.90
1997	Kalatos	5	Willie Ryan	Andreas Wöhler	1:47.20
1998	Emilio Romano	3	Stanley Chin	Andreas Schütz	1:46.71
1999	Gonlargo	3	Pascal van de Keere	Uwe Ostmann	1:44.21
2000	Banyumanik	4	Georg Bocskai	Mario Hofer	1:44.59
2001	Banyumanik	5	Andreas Boschert	Mario Hofer	1:45.79
2002	War Blade	5	L. Hammer-Hansen	Andreas Schütz	1:47.56
2003	War Blade	6	Andrasch Starke	Andreas Schütz	1:48.41
2004	Tahreeb	3	Willie Supple	Marcus Tregoning	1:47.14
2005	Santiago	3	Andreas Boschert	Uwe Ostmann	1:47.78
2006	Lord of England	3	Andrasch Starke	Mario Hofer	1:44.50
2007	Soldier Hollow	7	Andrasch Starke	Peter Schiergen	1:48.45
2008	Wiesenpfad	5	Adrie de Vries	Waldemar Hickst	2:04.53
2009	Zaungast	5	Terence Hellier	Waldemar Hickst	2:04.50
2010	Norderney ^{[a]}	4	Andrasch Starke	Peter Schiergen	2:03.10
2011	Elle Shadow	4	Andrasch Starke	Peter Schiergen	2:02.65
2012	All Shamar	3	Andrasch Starke	Waldemar Hickst	2:06.09
2013	Neatico	6	Andrasch Starke	Peter Schiergen	1:46.64
2014	Amaron	5	Fabien Lefebvre	Andreas Löwe	1:49.23
2015	Nordico	4	Alexander Pietsch	Mario Hofer	1:52.14
2016	Potemkin	5	Eduardo Pedroza	Andreas Wöhler	1:52.94
2017	Wild Chief	6	Alexander Pietsch	Jens Hirschberger	1:48.78
2018	Degas	5	Adrie de Vries	Markus Klug	1:48.68
2019	Potemkin	8	Eduardo Pedroza	Andreas Wöhler	1:47.46
2020	Aviateur	5	Filip Minarik	Jean-Pierre Carvalho	1:45.53
2021	Liberty London	5	Andrasch Starke	Waldemar Hickst	1:47.52
2022	Parol	5	Adrie de Vries	Bohumil Nedorostek	1:46.91
2023	Best Lightning	5	Thore Hammer Hansen	Andreas Suborics	1:45.40
2024	Penalty	3	Thore Hammer Hansen	Hank Grewe	1:48.67
2025	Best Lightning	7	Martin Seidl	Andreas Suborics	1:44.38
2026	Best Lightning	8	Benjamin Marie	Andreas Suborics	1:46.77

^{a} Illo finished first in 2010, but he was relegated to third place following a stewards' inquiry.

== See also ==
- List of German flat horse races
- Recurring sporting events established in 1968 – this race is included under its original title, Grosser Preis von Dortmund.
