= St. Paddy =

British-bred Thoroughbred racehorse

- Sire: Aureole
- Grandsire: Hyperion
- Dam: Edie Kelly
- Damsire: Bois Roussel
- Sex: Stallion
- Foaled: 1957
- Country: Great Britain
- Colour: Bay
- Breeder: Sir Victor Sassoon
- Owner: Sir Victor Sassoon
- Trainer: Noel Murless
- Record: 14: 9-2-2
- Earnings: £97,193

Major wins
- Royal Lodge Stakes (1959); Dante Stakes (1960); Great Voltigeur Stakes (1960); Jockey Club Stakes (1961); Eclipse Stakes (1961); Hardwicke Stakes (1961); British Classic Race wins: Epsom Derby (1960); St. Leger Stakes (1960)

Honours
- Deltic locomotive 55001 was named St. Paddy
- Last updated on 13 May 2022

St. Paddy (1957–1984) was a British Thoroughbred racehorse and sire. In 1960, he won both the Epsom Derby and the St Leger. His performances in both 1960 and 1961 were instrumental in making his sire Aureole the Leading sire in Great Britain & Ireland for each year.

== Background ==
Owned and bred by Sir Victor Sassoon, he was out of the mare Edie Kelly, and sired by Aureole, a winner of the Coronation Cup and King George VI and Queen Elizabeth Stakes. Edie Kelly, who ran 14 times winning one small apprentice handicap, later produced Parmeila, a filly who won the Ribblesdale Stakes and the Park Hill Stakes in 1970. St. Paddy's grandsire, Hyperion, and his damsire, Bois Roussel, both won The Derby. St. Paddy was bred and raised at his owner's Thornton Stud, Thornton-le-Street, North Yorkshire.

== Racing career ==
=== 1959:two-year-old season ===
St. Paddy finished unplaced on his debut in the Acomb Stakes at York in August. In September he won the Royal Lodge Stakes at Ascot.

=== 1960:three-year-old season ===
On 27 April 1960, St. Paddy finished unplaced behind Martial in the 2000 Guineas on his seasonal debut. He then won the Dante Stakes at York in May.

In the Derby on 1 June at Epsom he was ridden by Lester Piggott and started at odds of 7/1. The race was run in warm, sunny weather and attracted the customary huge crowd, which included the Queen. He was prominent from the start, took the lead three furlongs from the finish, and was never in danger, winning easily by three lengths from Alcaeus with Kythnos third. The race was marred by a fatal injury sustained by the favourite Angers.

He was narrowly beaten in the Gordon Stakes by Kipling, to whom he was conceding five pounds. He then won the Great Voltigeur Stakes at York in August. In the St Leger at Doncaster in September he stated odds-on favourite against eight rivals and won easily by three lengths from Die Hard.

=== 1961: four-year-old season ===
St. Paddy won the Coombe Stakes at Sandown, the Hardwicke Stakes at Royal Ascot and the Eclipse Stakes at Sandown in July. In the Eclipse he led from the start and won impressively from Proud Chieftain, leading the Glasgow Herald to describe him as "the complete racehorse". He started favourite for the King George VI and Queen Elizabeth Stakes at Ascot one week later, but was beaten three lengths into second place by the Prix du Jockey Club winner Right Royal.

In Autumn, St. Paddy won the Jockey Club Stakes, but was beaten in the Champion Stakes. His defeat meant that he failed to break the record for prize money by a British-trained horse, his final total of $272,141 placing him second behind Ballymoss. He was then retired to stud.

== Stud record ==
St. Paddy was retired after the 1961 racing season to stand at stud at Beech House Stud in Newmarket. As a sire, he met with reasonable success, notably siring Connaught, winner of the Eclipse Stakes and Jupiter Island, a multiple graded stakes race winner whose biggest success came in the 1986 Japan Cup. St. Paddy was pensioned in 1981 and died on 16 May 1984 at the age of 27. He is buried at Beech House Stud.

== Assessment and honours ==
Following the London & North Eastern Railway tradition of naming locomotives after winning racehorses, British Railways "Deltic" Diesel locomotive no. D9001 (later 55001) was named after this horse on 7 July 1961, and remained in service until 5 January 1980.

In their book A Century of Champions, John Randall and Tony Morris rated St. Paddy an “average” Derby winner and the one hundred and twenty-first best British racehorse of the 20th Century.

== Sire line tree ==
- St Paddy
  - St Puckle
    - What A Nuisance
  - Connaught
    - Sir Montagu
    - Connaught Ranger
    - Centurion
    - Remainderman
      - One Man
    - Dukedom
    - Playboy Jubilee
    - Buffavento
    - Lirung
  - Jupiter Island
    - Mr Cool

== Pedigree ==
Pedigree of St Paddy
Sire Aureole	Hyperion	Gainsborough	Bayardo
Sire Aureole	Hyperion	Gainsborough	Rosedrop
Sire Aureole	Hyperion	Selene	Chaucer*
Sire Aureole	Hyperion	Selene	Serenissima
Sire Aureole	Angelola	Donatello	Blenheim
Sire Aureole	Angelola	Donatello	Delleana
Sire Aureole	Angelola	Feola	Friar Marcus
Sire Aureole	Angelola	Feola	Aloe
Dam Edie Kelly	Bois Roussel	Vatout	Prince Chimay*
Dam Edie Kelly	Bois Roussel	Vatout	Vashti
Dam Edie Kelly	Bois Roussel	Plucky Liege	Spearmint
Dam Edie Kelly	Bois Roussel	Plucky Liege	Concertina
Dam Edie Kelly	Caerlissa	Caerleon	Phalaris
Dam Edie Kelly	Caerlissa	Caerleon	Canyon*
Dam Edie Kelly	Caerlissa	Sister Sarah	Abbots Trace
Dam Edie Kelly	Caerlissa	Sister Sarah	Sarita

* St Paddy is inbred 4S x 5D x 5D to the stallion Chaucer, meaning that he appears fourth generation once on the sire side of his pedigree, and fifth generation twice (via Prince Chimay and Canyon) on the dam side of his pedigree.
