= First Trump =

British-bred Thoroughbred racehorse

- Sire: Primo Dominie
- Grandsire: Dominion
- Dam: Valika
- Damsire: Valiyar
- Sex: Stallion
- Foaled: 4 February 1991
- Country: United Kingdom
- Colour: Chestnut
- Breeder: P D Rossdale and D H Clifton
- Owner: Mollers Racing
- Trainer: Geoff Wragg
- Record: 12: 5-3-1
- Earnings: £186,677

Major wins
- July Stakes (1993); Richmond Stakes (1993); Middle Park Stakes (1993)

Awards
- European Champion Two-Year-Old Colt (1993)
- Last updated on August 25, 2007

First Trump (1991–2015) was a British Thoroughbred racehorse. In 1993 he has named European Champion Two-Year-Old Colt at the Cartier Racing Awards. In his championship season he won five of his six races including the Group One Middle Park Stakes, the Group Two Richmond Stakes and the Group Three July Stakes. He was retired to stud after failing to win in six starts as a three-year-old in 1994.

== Background ==
First Trump, a 15.3 hands high chestnut horse with a narrow white stripe and three white socks, was sired by Primo Dominie out of the mare Valika. Primo Dominie was a high-class two-year-old and sprinter who won four Group races in 1984 and 1985 before going on to sire over six hundred winners during his stud career. Apart from First Trump, his best offspring was the Premio Roma winner Imperial Dancer. Valika failed to win a race, but was a half-sister of the European Champion Sprinter Mr Brooks. Unusually for a top-class modern racehorse, his pedigree includes neither Northern Dancer nor Mr. Prospector.

First Trump was sent as a yearling to the Tattersalls sales in September 1992, where he was bought for 66,000 gns by John Ferguson Bloodstock. During his racing career he was owned by Mollers Racing an organisation financed by a trust fund set up by Eric Moller who died in 1988. First Trump was trained throughout his career by Geoff Wragg at Newmarket, Suffolk and ridden in all his races by Michael Hills.

== Racing career ==
=== 1993: two-year-old season ===
First Trump began his career in a maiden race at Yarmouth in June. He was made 5/4 favourite and took the lead inside the final furlong to win by a length. He followed up at Newbury three weeks later, winning a minor stakes race by a length and a half.

In July at Newmarket he was moved up to Group class for the first time in the July Stakes. He was made third favourite behind the Norfolk Stakes winner Turtle Island and Wahiba Riva who had finished third in the Coventry Stakes. First Trump seemed to be struggling in the early stages but ran on strongly in the final furlong to take the lead close to the finish and win by half a length. He was given a hard ride by Hills whose use of the whip on an inexperienced horse attracted some attention. The Independent's correspondent offered the opinion that First Trump had the makings of "a fine performer when his education is complete." The betting for the Richmond Stakes at Glorious Goodwood three weeks suggested that the race was effectively a match between First Trump and the Coventry Stakes winner Stonehatch. The race reflected the betting, as the two colts pulled well clear of the other runners inside the final furlong, with First Trump being driven out by Hills to prevail by half a length. After the race he was offered at 16/1 for the following year's 2000 Guineas.

First Trump started joint favourite for the Mill Reef Stakes at Newbury in September, but could never reach the leaders and lost his unbeaten record, finishing third to Polish Laughter. On his final start of the season, First Trump returned to his home track of Newmarket for the Group One Middle Park Stakes. He was fourth choice in the betting at 6/1 behind Turtle Island, who, since his defeat in the July Stakes, had won the Group One Phoenix Stakes and the Group Two Gimcrack Stakes. First Trump was held up in the early stages, in accordance with his trainer's instructions, before being moved to the outside to make his challenge in the final furlong. He "accelerated instantly" to take the lead in the closing strides and win by a head from his stable companion, the future July Cup winner Owington.

=== 1994: three-year-old season ===
Although First Trump's breeding suggested that he was most unlikely to be effective over longer distances, he was aimed at the 2000 Guineas, but was withdrawn from the race after suffering a ligament injury. Instead, he began his season in late May, when he took on older horses in the Prix du Palais Royal at Longchamp and finished a length and a half second to Young Ern.

His next two races appeared to confirm the doubts about his stamina as he finished unplaced over one mile in the St. James's Palace Stakes at Royal Ascot and the Sussex Stakes at Goodwood. Between these two races he was sold as a prospective stallion to the National Stud.

A return to sprint distances brought about an improvement in form, but no wins, as he finished second Lake Coniston in both the Prix de Meautry at Deauville and the Diadem Stakes at Ascot. On his final start he finished fourth to Zieten in the Challenge Stakes.

== Assessment ==
At the Cartier Racing Awards for 1993, First Trump was named European Champion Two-Year-Old Colt. In the official International Classification of two-year-olds, however, he was rated only the seventh best colt to race in Europe in 1993, three pounds below Grand Lodge.

== Stud career ==
First Trump retired to the National Stud at the end of his three-year-old season. Between 2002 and 2006 he stood at the Throckmorton Court stud in Worcestershire. He formerly stands at the Walton Fields Stud near Melton Mowbray in Leicestershire for a fee of £1,500. First Trump Died in 2015.

He has sired the winners of over three hundred winners, but none of them at Group One level. His most important winners have been Mrs P (Flying Childers Stakes), Torosay Spring (Summer Stakes) and Media Mogul (Will Rogers Stakes). His Listed winning daughter Two Clubs produced the Champion Sprinter Red Clubs. He has also had some success with jumpers including the Cheltenham Festival winner Reveillez.

== Pedigree ==
Pedigree of First Trump (GB), chestnut stallion, 1991
Sire Primo Dominie (GB) 1982	Dominion; 1972	Derring-Do	Darius
Sire Primo Dominie (GB) 1982	Dominion; 1972	Derring-Do	Sipsey Bridge
Sire Primo Dominie (GB) 1982	Dominion; 1972	Picture Palace	Princely Gift
Sire Primo Dominie (GB) 1982	Dominion; 1972	Picture Palace	Palais Glide
Sire Primo Dominie (GB) 1982	Swan Ann; 1971	My Swanee	Petition
Sire Primo Dominie (GB) 1982	Swan Ann; 1971	My Swanee	Grey Rhythm
Sire Primo Dominie (GB) 1982	Swan Ann; 1971	Anna Barry	Falls of Clyde
Sire Primo Dominie (GB) 1982	Swan Ann; 1971	Anna Barry	Anagram
Dam Valika (GB) 1985	Valiyar; 1979	Red God	Nasrullah
Dam Valika (GB) 1985	Valiyar; 1979	Red God	Spring Run
Dam Valika (GB) 1985	Valiyar; 1979	Val Divine	Val de Loir
Dam Valika (GB) 1985	Valiyar; 1979	Val Divine	Pola Bella
Dam Valika (GB) 1985	Double Finesse; 1975	Double Jump	Rustam
Dam Valika (GB) 1985	Double Finesse; 1975	Double Jump	Fair Bid
Dam Valika (GB) 1985	Double Finesse; 1975	Horus Blue	Golden Horus
Dam Valika (GB) 1985	Double Finesse; 1975	Horus Blue	Fair Blue (Family: 8-k)
