= Pipalong =

Irish-bred Thoroughbred racehorse

- Sire: Pips Pride
- Grandsire: Efisio
- Dam: Limpopo
- Damsire: Green Desert
- Sex: Mare
- Foaled: 26 January 1996
- Country: Ireland
- Colour: Bay
- Breeder: Yeomanstown Stud
- Owner: Tom Bennett
- Trainer: Tim Easterby
- Record: 37: 10-7-4
- Earnings: £421,698

Major wins
- Two-Year-Old Trophy (1998); Great St. Wilfrid Stakes (1999); Wentworth Stakes (1999); Palace House Stakes (2000); Cecil Frail Stakes (2000); Stanley Leisure Sprint Cup (2000); Duke of York Stakes (2001)

Honours
- Pipalong Stakes at Pontefract Racecourse

Pipalong (foaled 26 January 1996) was an Irish-bred, British-trained Thoroughbred racehorse and broodmare. She was sold cheaply as a yearling but developed into a top-class specialist sprinter who excelled on soft ground. Trained in Yorkshire by Tim Easterby, she was highly tried throughout her racing career, running thirty seven times between April 1998 and October 2001.

She showed very good form as a juvenile in 1998, winning the Two-Year-Old Trophy after finishing second in both the Queen Mary Stakes and the Cherry Hinton Stakes. In the following year she won the Great St. Wilfrid Stakes and the Wentworth Stakes as well as finishing placed in several other good sprint races. She reached her peak as a four-year-old in 2000 when she won the Palace House Stakes and the Cecil Frail Stakes before recording her biggest win in the Group One Stanley Leisure Sprint Cup. In the same year she finished third in the July Cup, Nunthorpe Stakes and Prix de l'Abbaye. Pipalong failed to reproduce her best form in 2001 but did win the Duke of York Stakes and again finished third in the Prix de l'Abbaye.

After her retirement from racing she became a broodmare and had some success as a dam of winners.

== Background ==
Pipalong is a bay mare with a narrow white blaze bred in Ireland by the County Kildare-based Yeomanstown Stud. She was the most successful horse sired by Pips Pride, who recorded his biggest win in the Phoenix Stakes. Her dam Limpopo showed little ability, failing to win in five races. She was distantly descended from the British broodmare Merry Devon, whose other descendants have included Jeune and Lord At War.

In October 1997 the yearling filly was consigned to the Tattersalls sale and was sold for 7,000 guineas. Throughout her racing year she was owned by Tom Bennett in partnership with Marjorie Easterby and trained in North Yorkshire by Marjorie's son Tim Easterby at his Habton Grange stable. In her first two seasons of racing Pipalong was ridden in all but one of her races by Lindsay Charnock.

== Racing career ==
=== 1998: two-year-old season ===
Pipalong began her racing career in a five furlong maiden race at Ripon Racecourse on 16 April and starting at odds of 5/1 in a thirteen-runner field. Running on soft ground she took the lead at half way and won by twelve lengths from College Music despite being eased down by Charnock in the final strides. In the following month she started favourite for a race over the same distance at York Racecourse and won by a neck from the Mick Channon-trained Bint Allayl. Kieren Fallon took the ride when Pipalong moved up in class to contest the Group Three Queen Mary Stakes at Royal Ascot in June. She recovered from a slow start to finish strongly but was beaten two lengths into second place by Bint Allayl. Charnock resumed the mount in the six furlong Cherry Hinton Stakes at Newmarket Racecourse in July in which the filly set the early pace before finishing second of the ten runners behind Wannabe Grand.

After a break of almost three months, Pipalong returned in the Oh So Sharp Stakes over seven furlongs at Newmarket and finished fourth behind Snittersby, Fragrant Oasis and Hula Angel (later to win the Irish 1000 Guineas). On 17 October Pipalong started 5/2 favourite in a 22-runner field for the Listed Comcast Teesside Two-Year-Old Trophy over six furlongs on heavy ground at Redcar Racecourse. She was among the leaders from the start, went to the front in the last quarter mile, and rallied after being headed by the colt Pistachio to regain the lead in the closing stages to win by a neck.

=== 1999: three-year-old season ===
Pipalong failed to win in her first seven starts as a three-year-old but ran consistently in good sprint races. In spring she finished fourth in the Thirsk Classic Trial and the Shergar Cup Sprint and then ran fifth in the Chartwell Fillies' Stakes. She then finished second when favourite for the Cecil Frail Stakes, fourth in a handicap race at Doncaster, second to Imperial Beauty in the Summer Stakes and fourth in the Queensferry Stakes. On 14 August at Ripon on soft ground the filly was matched against colts and older horses in the Great St Wilfrid Handicap and was assigned a weight of 131 pounds in a 23-runner field. The filly started slowly but began to make rapid progress in the last quarter mile. She caught the colt Bon Ami in the final stride and won by a short head. Tim Easterby commented "It never occurred to me that she hadn't trained on. She has worked just as well, if not better, this year than she did last season. We decided to run her here instead of having a crack at the Nunthorpe, and even though she had a lot of weight back in a handicap, I was very hopeful. I felt she had just come right, and she loves this ground".

Eight days after her win at Redcar, Pipalong finished second to Wannebe Grand in the Flying Fillies' Stakes at Pontefract. She was then moved up to Group One level for the first time when she contested the Stanley Leisure Sprint Cup over six furlongs at Haydock. She started a 25/1 outsider and finished unplaced behind Diktat. She then finished fifth under a weight of 124 pounds in the Ayr Gold Cup before finishing second to Gaelic Storm in the Bentinck Stakes at Newmarket in October. On her final start of the season the filly started second favourite behind Gaelic Storm in the Listed Wentworth Stakes on soft ground at Doncaster on 6 November with the other 18 runners including Superior Premium (Stewards' Cup) and Muqtarib (Richmond Stakes). She was among the leaders from the start and stayed on in the closing stages to take the lead on the line and win by a short head from Two Clubs.

=== 2000: four-year-old season ===
After Charnock's retirement at the end of 1999 Kevin Darley took over the ride on Pipalong and partnered her in all but one of her subsequent races. On her seasonal debut she started odds-on favourite for a minor race over six furlongs at Thirsk and won by three and a half lengths from her stablemate Hot Tin Roof. She was then stepped up in class and started at odds of 9/1 in a 21-runner field for the Group Three Palace House Stakes over five furlongs at Newmarket on 6 May. The Mill Reef Stakes winner Arkadian Hero headed the betting market whilst the other contenders included Kier Park (Cornwallis Stakes), Bishops Court (Prix du Petit Couvert), Superior Premium, The Tatling, Rambling Bear (King George Stakes), Bolshoi (King's Stand Stakes) and Halmahera (Cornwallis Stakes). After racing prominently from the start, Pipalong took the lead in the final furlong and won by a neck and half a length from Kier Park and Rambling Bear in a blanket finish which saw the first nine finishers covered by three and a half lengths. After the race Tim Easterby said "She's a star-that was tremendous. She'll be sprint queen this year. The plan was to go to York for the Duke of York, but she had been working so well I thought I'd let her take her chance here. Six furlongs and soft ground would suit her better".

Twelve days after her win at Newmarket Pipalong was moved back up in distance for the six-furlong Duke of York Stakes at York and finished second of the ten runners beaten one and a half lengths by the five-year-old Lend A Hand. In the Listed Cecil Frail Stakes, for fillies and mares at Haydock on 10 June, Pipalong started odds-on favourite against five younger opponents. Ridden for the first and only time by Michael Roberts she overtook the front-running Romanylei in the final furlong and won "readily" by half a length.

Racing on firm ground at Royal Ascot, Pipalong made little impact in the Cork and Orrery Stakes, finishing unplaced behind Superior Premium. In the Group One July Cup on good-to-soft ground at Newmarket she produced a much better performance as she was narrowly beaten in a three-way photo finish by the Japanese colt Agnes World and the three-year-old Lincoln Dancer with Primo Valentino and Lend A Hand in fourth and fifth. Pipalong produced another good effort in the Nunthorpe Stakes at York in August when she finished third behind Nuclear Debate and Bertolini. The six-furlong Stanley Leisure Sprint Cup at Haydock on 6 September saw Pipalong start the 3/1 second favourite behind Lincoln Dancer for a race run on heavy ground. The best-fancied of the other eleven runners were Sampower Star (Prix de Saint-Georges), Bold Edge (Prix Maurice de Gheest), Tomba (Prix de la Forêt), Vision of Night (Prix de Meautry) and Auenklang (Prix Robert Papin). After tracking the leaders in the early stages, Darley sent Pipalong into the lead approaching the final furlong and the filly kept on well to land the Group One prize by three quarters of a length from Sampower Star, with Tomba a length away in third. Peter Easterby representing his son Tim said "I can't remember how much this filly cost but it wasn't much. My wife has a half share. Pipalong has had some hard races, but always comes back for more. If anything she hit the front a bit too soon today, but it's always hard to come from behind on this sort of ground" whilst Darley commented "She deserved that and did everything right today. That's my first Group One winner of the year. It's nice to do it on a filly I've been associated with all year".

On her final appearance of the season, Pipalong was sent to France for the Prix de l'Abbaye over 1000 metres at Longchamp Racecourse in October and finished third behind Namid and Superstar Leo.

=== 2001: five-year-old season ===
In March 2001 Pipalong was sent to the United Arab Emirates for the Dubai Golden Shaheen but finished tenth of the fifteen runners behind the American gelding Caller One. On her return to Europe she attempted to repeat her 2000 success in the Palace House Stakes but ran unplaced behind Rushcutter Bay. On 17 May Pipalong started a 14/1 outsider in her second attempt to win the Duke of York Stakes. Bertolini started favourite ahead of Astonished with Bahamian Pirate, Vision of Night and Hot Tin Roof also among the fourteen-runner field. The mare produced what was described as a "cracking effort", taking the lead approaching the final furlong and holding off the sustained challenge of Tedburrow to win by a neck. Following the race Tim Easterby said "She's a star! She liked the weather in Dubai but she didn't like he track – there was too much sand and it was too firm".

Pipalong failed to win in her remaining six races. She finished eighth behind Harmonic Way in the Cork and Orrery Stakes and then ran unplaced behind Mozart in the July Cup. She then finished seventh behind Mozart in the Nunthorpe Stakes and seventh behind Nuclear Debate when she was made favourite to repeat her 2000 victory in the Haydock Sprint Cup. In September she finished fourth behind Nice One Claire in a blanket finish to the Diadem Stakes at Ascot. In her final appearance she contested her second Prix de l'Abbaye and started a 20/1 outsider. Pipalong repeated her performance of the previous year to finish third, beaten half a length and two and a half lengths by Imperial Beauty and Bahamian Pirate.

== Breeding record ==
In December 2001 Pipalong returned to the sales ring at Tattersalls and was bought for 600,000 guineas by the bloodstock agent Anthony Stroud. She entered the ownership of Tower Bloodstock, a horse breeding company associated with the Coolmore Stud. She has produced at least eight foals and three winners:

- Jamrah, a bay filly, foaled in 2003, sired by Danehill. Unraced.
- War and Peace, bay colt (later gelded), 2004, by Danehill. Won one race.
- Alliance, chestnut filly, 2005, by Danehill Dancer. Failed to win in seven races.
- Navajo, bay colt, 2006, by Danehill Dancer. Failed to win in three races.
- Walk On Bye, bay filly, 2007, by Danehill Dancer. Won two races including the Anglesey Stakes.
- Classic Music, filly, 2008, by Danehill Dancer. Unraced.
- Style and Class, filly, 2010, by Galileo. Unraced.
- Motherland, chestnut colt, 2013, by Galileo. Won two races.

== Pedigree ==
Pedigree of Pipalong (IRE), bay mare, 1996
Sire Pips Pride (IRE) 1990	Efisio (GB); 1982	Formidable	Forli
Sire Pips Pride (IRE) 1990	Efisio (GB); 1982	Formidable	Native Partner
Sire Pips Pride (IRE) 1990	Efisio (GB); 1982	Eldoret	High Top
Sire Pips Pride (IRE) 1990	Efisio (GB); 1982	Eldoret	Bamburi
Sire Pips Pride (IRE) 1990	Elkie Brooks (GB); 1981	Relkino	Relko
Sire Pips Pride (IRE) 1990	Elkie Brooks (GB); 1981	Relkino	Pugnacity
Sire Pips Pride (IRE) 1990	Elkie Brooks (GB); 1981	Cresset	Henry the Seventh
Sire Pips Pride (IRE) 1990	Elkie Brooks (GB); 1981	Cresset	Quoff
Dam Limpopo (GB) 1989	Green Desert (USA); 1983	Danzig	Northern Dancer
Dam Limpopo (GB) 1989	Green Desert (USA); 1983	Danzig	Pas de Nom
Dam Limpopo (GB) 1989	Green Desert (USA); 1983	Foreign Courier	Sir Ivor
Dam Limpopo (GB) 1989	Green Desert (USA); 1983	Foreign Courier	Courtly Dee
Dam Limpopo (GB) 1989	Grey Goddess (IRE); 1983	Godswalk	Dancer's Image
Dam Limpopo (GB) 1989	Grey Goddess (IRE); 1983	Godswalk	Kates Intent
Dam Limpopo (GB) 1989	Grey Goddess (IRE); 1983	Thiella	Busted
Dam Limpopo (GB) 1989	Grey Goddess (IRE); 1983	Thiella	Seaswan (Family: 19-c)
