= 1999 1000 Guineas =

186th 1000 Guineas Stakes
- 1000 Guineas
- Location: Newmarket Racecourse
- Date: 2 May 1999
- Winning horse: Wince (GB)
- Jockey: Kieren Fallon
- Trainer: Henry Cecil (GB)
- Owner: Khalid Abdullah

The 1999 1000 Guineas Stakes was a horse race held at Newmarket Racecourse on Sunday 2 May 1999. It was the 186th running of the 1000 Guineas. As the traditional Rowley Mile course was being redeveloped the race was run on Newmarket's July Course.

The winner was Khalid Abdullah's Wince, a British-bred bay filly trained at Newmarket in Suffolk by Henry Cecil and ridden by Kieren Fallon. Wince's victory was the first in the race for her owner. Cecil had won the race five times before with One in a Million (1979), Fairy Footsteps (1981), Oh So Sharp (1985), Bosra Sham (1996) and Sleepytime (1997), the last of which had given Fallon his only previous winner in the race. Wince's win was also the first and only British classic success for Wince's sire Selkirk.

== The contenders ==
The race attracted a field of twenty-two runners, nineteen trained in the United Kingdom, two in Ireland and one in France. The favourite was Wince, who had won three of her seven races including the Fred Darling Stakes on her most recent appearance. The Irish challengers were Sunspangled, trained by Aidan O'Brien at Ballydoyle who had won the Fillies' Mile at Ascot Racecourse in September and the Tommy Stack-trained Fear And Greed, runner-up in the Moyglare Stud Stakes. France was represented by Moiava, who had defeated colts when winning the Critérium de Maisons-Laffitte. The Godolphin Racing stable entered Pescara, who had been off the racecourse since finishing fifth in the Prix Morny and Fairy Queen who was unbeaten in two minor races. The other runners included Wannabe Grand who had won both the Cherry Hinton Stakes and the Cheveley Park Stakes in 1998, as well as Circle of Gold (Prestige Stakes), Atlantic Destiny (Sirenia Stakes), Valentine Waltz (Nell Gwyn Stakes), Golden Silca (Mill Reef Stakes) and Hula Angel (Rockfel Stakes).

Wince headed the betting at odds of 4/1 ahead of Moiava (5/1), Sunspangled (7/1) and Pescara (10/1).

== The race ==
At the start of the race, the fillies split into two groups on either side of the straight: Pescara led the group on the far side (the left-hand side from the jockeys' viewpoint) whilst Fairy Queen headed the stand-side group. As the early leaders faded the two groups merged with a quarter of a mile to run. Valentine Waltz, who had raced on the far side, briefly took the overall lead but was quickly challenged by Wince and Wannabe Grand for the stands-side runners. Wince gained the advantage in the final furlong and won by half a length and a head from Wannabe Grand and Valentine Waltz.

== Race details ==
- Sponsor: Sagitta
- First prize: £128,500
- Surface: Turf
- Going: Good to Firm
- Distance: 8 furlongs
- Number of runners: 22
- Winner's time: 1:37.91

== Full result ==
Pos.	Marg.	Horse (bred)	Jockey	Trainer (Country)	Odds
1		Wince (GB)	Kieren Fallon	Henry Cecil (GB)	4/1 fav
2	½	Wannabe Grand (IRE)	Pat Eddery	Jeremy Noseda (GB)	16/1
3	shd	Valentine Waltz (IRE)	Ray Cochrane	John Gosden (GB)	11/1
4	2½	Capistrano Day (USA)	Darryll Holland	John Gosden (GB)	14/1
5	¾	Pescara (IRE)	Frankie Dettori	Saeed bin Suroor (GB)	10/1
6	shd	Hula Angel (USA)	Michael Hills	Barry Hills (GB)	14/1
7	hd	Golden Silca (GB)	Steve Drowne	Mick Channon (GB)	50/1
8	1¼	Fragrant Oasis (USA)	Gary Carter	Ed Dunlop (GB)	40/1
9	½	Kuwait Dawn (IRE)	Jimmy Quinn	Kamil Mahdi (GB)	50/1
10	¾	Fairy Queen (IRE)	Richard Hills	Saeed bin Suroor (GB)	12/1
11	shd	Atlantic Destiny (IRE)	Piere Strydom	Mark Johnston (GB)	66/1
12	½	Boomerang Blade (GB)	John Stack	Bryan Smart (GB)	100/1
13	1¼	Fear and Greed (IRE)	Jamie Spencer	Tommy Stack (IRE)	20/1
14	nk	Circle of Gold (IRE)	Jimmy Fortune	Peter Chapple-Hyam (GB)	33/1
15	nk	Sunspangled (IRE)	Mick Kinane	Aidan O'Brien (IRE)	7/1
16	½	Evening Promise (GB)	Royston Ffrench	Bryan McMahon (GB)	100/1
17	½	Bountiful Lady (USA)	Willie Ryan	Michael Stoute (GB)	33/1
18	nk	Imperial Beauty (USA)	Seb Sanders	Peter Makin (GB)	16/1
19	¾	Moiava (FR)	Richard Quinn	Criquette Head (FR)	5/1
20	shd	Greensand (GB)	Richard Hughes	Richard Hannon, Snr (GB)	66/1
21	¾	Hasty Words (IRE)	Kevin Darley	Barry Hills (GB)	33/1
22	10	Lamzena (IRE)	Michael Roberts	Geoff Wragg (GB)	66/1

- Abbreviations: nse = nose; nk = neck; shd = head; hd = head; dist = distance; UR = unseated rider; DSQ = disqualified; PU = pulled up

== Winner's details ==
Further details of the winner, Wince

- Foaled: 26 April 1996
- Country: United Kingdom
- Sire: Selkirk; Dam: Flit (Lyphard)
- Owner: Khalid Abdullah
- Breeder: Juddmonte Farms
