= Valentine Waltz =

Irish-bred Thoroughbred racehorse

- Sire: Be My Guest
- Grandsire: Northern Dancer
- Dam: Save Me The Waltz
- Damsire: Kings Lake
- Sex: Mare
- Foaled: 14 February 1996
- Country: Ireland
- Colour: Bay
- Breeder: Kilfrush Stud
- Owner: Kirby Maher Syndicate
- Trainer: Aidan O'Brien; John Gosden
- Record: 11: 3-1-5
- Earnings: £183,439

Major wins
- Nell Gwyn Stakes (1999); Poule d'Essai des Pouliches (1999)

Valentine Waltz (foaled 14 February 1996) was an Irish-bred Thoroughbred racehorse and broodmare. As a two-year-old she was initially trained in Ireland where she failed to win in four races although she did finish third in the Marble Hill Stakes. Later in the year she was moved to England and improved, winning a minor race and being placed in both the Rockingham Stakes and the Rockfel Stakes. In the following year she developed into one of the best fillies of her generation in Europe, winning the Nell Gwyn Stakes and the Poule d'Essai des Pouliches as well as finishing third in both the 1000 Guineas and the Coronation Stakes. After her retirement from racing she became a broodmare and had modest success as a dam of winners.

== Background ==
Valentine Waltz was a bay mare bred in Ireland by the County Limerick-based Kilfrush Stud. As a yearling she was consigned to the Tattersalls Houghton Yearling Sales on 1 October and was bought for 75,000 guineas by Kern/Lillingston Associates. The filly entered the ownership of the Kirby Maher Syndicate and was sent into training with Aidan O'Brien at Ballydoyle.

She was from the twentieth crop of foals sired by Be My Guest, an American-bred stallion who won the Waterford Crystal Mile when trained in Ireland by Vincent O'Brien. Be My Guest's other offspring included Assert, Pentire Go and Go, Luth Enchantee and On The House. Her dam, Save Me The Waltz, won one race in France and became a successful broodmare who also produced the Matron Stakes winner Sense of Style. She was a half-sister to Last Tycoon and closely related to Assert, Bikala and Eurobird.

== Racing career ==
=== 1998: two-year-old season ===
On her racecourse debut Valentine Waltz started the 6/4 for a maiden race over five furlongs at Cork Racecourse on 26 April but finished only fourth of the eleven runners behind Show Me The Money. Seventeen days later she went off favourite for a similar event at Navan Racecourse but was beaten again, coming home third behind the colts My Chief and Rainbows Forever. Despite her two defeats she was stepped up in class for the Listed Marble Hill Stakes at the Curragh on 23 May. Starting a 25/1 outsider she stayed on well in the closing stages to take third place behind Access All Areas and Coralita, beaten half a length by the winner. The filly was dropped back to maiden class at the Curragh on 27 June but disappointed as she was beaten more than nine lengths into fourth place in a race won by Fear and Greed.

Shortly after her second defeat at the Curragh Valentine Waltz was transferred to England and joined the stable of John Gosden. On her first run for her new trainer the filly started 5/2 second choice for a seven furlong maiden at Brighton Racecourse on 30 September. Ridden by Daragh O'Donohoe she recorded her first victory as she led from the start and won "comfortably" by four lengths. Ten days later at Doncaster Racecourse she finished strongly to take third place behind the colts Undeterred and Indiana Legend in the Listed Rockingham Stakes. On 17 October she was stepped up to Group 2 class for the Rockfel Stakes at Newmarket Racecourse and produced her best performance of the season. Starting a 20/1 outsider she overcame interference in the final furlong to finish second of the fourteen runners, beaten one and a quarter lengths by Hula Angel.

=== 1999: three-year-old season ===
On 13 April Valentine Waltz was ridden by Frankie Dettori when she began her second campaign in the Group 3 Nell Gwyn Stakes (a trial race for the 1,000 Guineas) over seven furlongs at Newmarket and started the 7/2 favourites against ten opponents. After racing just behind the leaders she went to the front approaching the final furlong and accelerated away from her rivals to win by three lengths. In the 1999 1000 Guineas at Newmarket on 2 May the filly was partnered by Ray Cochrane and went off at odds of 11/1 in a field of 22. Racing up the far side of the track, she briefly took the lead a furlong out but was headed in the closing stages and finished third, beaten half a length and a short head by Wince and Wannabe Grand who raced up the opposite side of the course.

Two weeks after her run in the Guineas Valentine Waltz was sent to contest the French equivalent, the Poule d'Essai des Pouliches over 1600 metres at Longchamp Racecourse. With Cochrane again in the saddle she started the 4.3/1 third favourite behind Moiava (Critérium de Maisons-Laffitte) and Rangoon Ruby, while the best-fancied of the other eleven runners included Calando (May Hill Stakes), Comillas (Prix des Réservoirs) and Venize (Prix de la Grotte). After turning tinto the straight in seventh place, Valentine Waltz produced a strong late run, took the lead inside the last 200 metres, and won by two lengths from the 42/1 outsider Karmifira. John Gosden commented "They went a cracking pace and I liked the way she won. She ran a grand race in the Guineas from a terrible draw... She is a tough little thing to come back and run like this after her hard race in the Guineas".

At Royal Ascot on 16 June Valentine Waltz was partnered by Pat Eddery when she started second favourite for the Coronation Stakes. After being restrained in the early stages ahe finished well without being able to reach the lead and dead-heated for third with Wannabe Grand behind Balisada and Golden Silca. Valentine Waltz did not race again and was retired at the end of the year.

== Breeding record ==
After her retirement from racing, Valentine Waltz became a broodmare for the American breeder George Strawbridge. She produced at least seven foals and two winners between 2002 and 2014:

- Bahja, a chestnut filly, foaled in 2002, sired by Seeking The Gold. Failed to win in two races.
- Vienna Prince, bay colt (later gelded), 2003, by Kingmambo. Failed to win in six races.
- Metternich, brown colt, 2005, by Seeking The Gold. Failed to win in two races.
- Dyna Waltz, bay filly, 2007, by Dynaformer. Won two races including the Lingfield Oaks Trial.
- Utterance, bay colt (gelded), 2009, by Dansili. Won one race.
- Perfect Lyric, bay filly, 2011, by Pivotal. Failed to win a race.
- Dream Waltz, bay filly, 2014, by Oasis Dream. Failed to win in two races.

== Pedigree ==
Pedigree of Valentine Waltz (IRE), bay filly, 1996
Sire Be My Guest (USA) 1974	Northern Dancer (CAN); 1961	Nearctic	Nearco (ITY)
Sire Be My Guest (USA) 1974	Northern Dancer (CAN); 1961	Nearctic	Lady Angela (GB)
Sire Be My Guest (USA) 1974	Northern Dancer (CAN); 1961	Natalma (USA)	Native Dancer
Sire Be My Guest (USA) 1974	Northern Dancer (CAN); 1961	Natalma (USA)	Almahmoud
Sire Be My Guest (USA) 1974	What a Treat; 1962	Tudor Minstrel (GB)	Owen Tudor
Sire Be My Guest (USA) 1974	What a Treat; 1962	Tudor Minstrel (GB)	Sansonnet
Sire Be My Guest (USA) 1974	What a Treat; 1962	Rare Treat	Stymie
Sire Be My Guest (USA) 1974	What a Treat; 1962	Rare Treat	Rare Perfume
Dam Save Me The Waltz (IRE) 1986	Kings Lake (USA); 1978	Nijinsky (CAN)	Northern Dancer
Dam Save Me The Waltz (IRE) 1986	Kings Lake (USA); 1978	Nijinsky (CAN)	Flaming Page
Dam Save Me The Waltz (IRE) 1986	Kings Lake (USA); 1978	Fish Bar (IRE)	Baldric (USA)
Dam Save Me The Waltz (IRE) 1986	Kings Lake (USA); 1978	Fish Bar (IRE)	Fisherman's Wharf
Dam Save Me The Waltz (IRE) 1986	Mill Princess (IRE); 1977	Mill Reef (USA)	Never Bend
Dam Save Me The Waltz (IRE) 1986	Mill Princess (IRE); 1977	Mill Reef (USA)	Milan Mill
Dam Save Me The Waltz (IRE) 1986	Mill Princess (IRE); 1977	Irish Lass (GB)	Sayajirao
Dam Save Me The Waltz (IRE) 1986	Mill Princess (IRE); 1977	Irish Lass (GB)	Scollato (Family: 8-c)

- Valentine Waltz was inbred 2 × 4 to Northern Dancer, meaning that this stallion appears in both the second and fourth generations of her pedigree.
