= Sean Woods (racehorse trainer) =

British racehorse trainer

Sean Woods (born 2 July 1965) is a racehorse trainer based in Newmarket.

Woods was born into a racing dynasty in Bangalore. His father, Barney Woods, was a jockey and trainer and his mother, Jessica Fownes, was the daughter of trainer Eric Fownes. Brothers Dwayne and Wendyll, who run the family stud at Newmarket, are also former jockeys. Woods is married to Lucy Hide, who is the daughter of trainer Tony Hide and the niece of jockey Edward Hide.

Before becoming a trainer, Woods was a National Hunt jockey and rode over 80 winners. When he was twenty-six, he bought La Grange stables in Newmarket and trained there for ten years. He saddled his first Group race winner in 1996, when the grey Mistle Cat, ridden by the trainer's brother Wendyll, landed the Prix du Palais-Royal at Longchamp in Paris. Later that season, Mistle Cat won the Premio Vittorio di Capua, at that time a Group 1 race, at the San Siro Racecourse in Milan. In 2000, Atlantis Prince, ridden by Frankie Dettori won the Group 2 Royal Lodge Stakes at Newmarket. Woods saddled over 250 winners in the eleven seasons he trained at La Grange stables.

In 2002, Woods left Newmarket to train in Hong Kong. He saddled 279 winners in Hong Kong, with total prize money of about £43 million. The Hong Kong Jockey Club failed to renew Woods' training licence in 2016, after he had had three seasons with poor results, which he put down to having been moved from stables at Sha Tin Racecourse to inferior facilities at the Olympic Stables.

Woods returned to training in Newmarket in 2021, having bought the Shalfleet stables from retired trainer Jeremy Noseda in 2020. In his first season back in Newmarket he had eleven winners. The following year he saddled thirty-three winners, including Princess Shabnam, winner of the Listed Flying Fillies' Stakes at Pontefract under Nicola Currie.

== Major wins ==
Italy

- Premio Vittorio di Capua – (1) – Mistle Cat (1996)
