= Hula Angel =

American-bred Thoroughbred racehorse

- Sire: Woodman
- Grandsire: Mr. Prospector
- Dam: Jode
- Damsire: Danzig
- Sex: Mare
- Foaled: 19 March 1996
- Country: United States
- Colour: Bay
- Breeder: Gainsborough Farm
- Owner: Jim Fleming
- Trainer: Barry Hills
- Record: 10: 3–0-2
- Earnings: £132,145

Major wins
- Rockfel Stakes (1998); Irish 1,000 Guineas (1999)

Hula Angel (foaled 19 March 1996) was an American-bred, British-trained Thoroughbred racehorse and broodmare best known for winning the Irish 1,000 Guineas in 1999. As a two-year-old she showed steady improvement in six races, winning a maiden on her third appearance and finishing third in the Oh So Sharp Stakes before winning the Group Two Rockfel Stakes. In the following spring she finished sixth in the 1000 Guineas before recording her biggest win in the Irish equivalent at the Curragh. She was well beaten in two subsequent races and was retired from racing at the end of the year. Hula Angel finished ahead of the 1,000 Guineas winner Wince in three of their four racecourse meetings. She has had some success a dam of winners.

== Background ==
Hula Angel was a bay mare with a narrow white blaze bred in Kentucky by Maktoum Al Maktoum's Gainsborough Farm. As a yearling she was sent to Europe and put up for auction in October 1997 at Goffs where she was bought for IR£85,000 by the bloodstock agents BBA Ireland. The filly entered the ownership of Jim Fleming and was sent into training with Barry Hills at Lambourn in Berkshire. She was ridden in all but one of her races by her trainer's son Michael Hills.

She was sired by Woodman an American-bred stallion who raced in Europe, winning the Anglesey Stakes and the Futurity Stakes as a two-year-old in 1985. He later had great success as a breeding stallion in the United States, siring Hector Protector, Hansel, Timber Country, Bosra Sham and Hawk Wing. Her dam Jode was a half-sister to the Kentucky Derby winner Spend A Buck.

== Racing career ==
=== 1998: two-year-old season ===
On her racecourse debut Hula Angel started at odds of 8/1 in maiden race over seven furlongs at Sandown Park Racecourse on 4 July in which she finished seventh of the ten runners behind the colt Aljabr. Racing against female opposition in a maiden over the same distance at Goodwood on 30 July she finished third behind the Henry Cecil-trained Bionic. On 19 August in a maiden at Kempton she recorded her first success as she led from the start and won by four lengths from the favourite Oriental Fashion. The filly was moved up sharply in class when she was sent to Ireland for the Group One Moyglare Stud Stakes at the Curragh on 6 September. Starting a 14/1 outsider she led for most of the way before fading in the closing stages and finishing eighth of the thirteen runners behind Edabiya.

After a four-week break, Hula Angel returned in the Listed Oh So Sharp Stakes over seven furlongs at Newmarket Racecourse on 3 October. After being restrained by Hills in the early stages she struggled to obtain a clear run in the last quarter mile but stayed on to take third place behind Smittenby and Fragrant Oasis with favourite Wince in fifth place. Two weeks later over the same course and distance she started at odds of 10/1 in a fourteen-runner field for the Group Two Rockfel Stakes. Wince started favourite while the other runners included Subito (Blue Seal Stakes), Atlantic Destiny (Sirenia Stakes), Fragrant Oasis and Valentine Waltz. After settling just behind the leaders she went to the front a furlong from the finish and won by a length and a quarter from Valentine Waltz, with the other Hills-trained runner Hasty Words a hort head away in third place.

=== 1999: three-year-old season ===
Hula Angel began her second season in the 1000 Guineas run that year over the July Course at Newmarket on 2 May. Starting at odds of 14/1 she tracked the leaders on the stands-side (the right-hand side from the jockeys' viewpoint) but made little progress in the closing stages and finished sixth behind Wince, Wannabe Grand, Valentine Waltz, Capistrano Day and Pescara. Three weeks later at the Curragh she faced Wince yet again in the Irish 1000 Guineas and started a 16/1 outsider whilst her old rival was made the 5/4 favourite. The other fifteen runners included Edabiya, Sunspangled, Mythical Girl (Princess Margaret Stakes), Show Me The Money (Round Tower Stakes, Cornwallis Stakes, Leopardstown 1,000 Guineas Trial Stakes), Capistrano Day and Carambola (Derrinstown Stud 1,000 Guineas Trial). Hills positioned her on the outside just behind the leaders as Carambola set the pace, before beginning to make progress approaching the final quarter mile. She took the lead a furlong from the finish and held on under strong pressure to win by a neck and a head from the outsiders Golden Silca and Dazzling Park. After the race Barry Hills said "She has done it well today. The ground was on the fast side for her at Newmarket. Obviously the Coronation Stakes at Royal Ascot is on the agenda, but I would like to run her over a mile and a quarter at some stage and she could go for the Nassau Stakes at Goodwood."

Hula Angel failed to reproduce her Curragh form in two subsequent races. In the Coronation Stakes at Royal Ascot on 16 June she finished unplaced behind Balisada after being hampered two furlongs from the finish. On her final appearance she made little impact as she finished seventh of the eight runners in the Falmouth Stakes at Newmarket on 9 July.

== Breeding record ==
Hula Angel was retired from racing to become a broodmare. In 2008 she was put up for auction at the Inglis Weanling & Breeding Stock Sale and was bought for $528,220 by Heritage Bloodstock. She has produced at least eleven foals and six winners:

- Stormy Love, a chestnut colt, foaled in 2002, by Giant's Causeway. Failed to win in four races.
- Sicilian, bay colt (later gelded), 2003, by Sadler's Wells. Won one race.
- Shevchenko, brown colt (gelded), 2004, by Rock of Gibraltar. Won three races.
- The Fist of God, bay colt (gelded), 2005, by Sadler's Wells. Won six races.
- Gazardiel, bay colt (later gelded), 2007, by Redoute's Choice. Won one race.
- Sarasini, bay filly, 2008, by Elusive Quality. Won one race in South Africa.
- Everglades Island, bay colt, 2010, by Montjeu. Failed to win in two races.
- Tigris River, bay colt (gelded), 2011, by Montjeu. Won four races.
- Promise Me, bay mare, 2012, by Montjeu
- Angels Seven, bay filly, 2013, by Galileo. Failed to win in three races.
- Hula High, colt, 2015, by High Chaparral

== Pedigree ==
Pedigree of Hula Angel (USA), bay mare, 1996
Sire Woodman (USA) 1983	Mr. Prospector (USA); 1970	Raise a Native	Native Dancer
Sire Woodman (USA) 1983	Mr. Prospector (USA); 1970	Raise a Native	Raise You
Sire Woodman (USA) 1983	Mr. Prospector (USA); 1970	Gold Digger	Nashua
Sire Woodman (USA) 1983	Mr. Prospector (USA); 1970	Gold Digger	Sequence
Sire Woodman (USA) 1983	Playmate (USA); 1975	Buckpasser	Tom Fool
Sire Woodman (USA) 1983	Playmate (USA); 1975	Buckpasser	Busanda
Sire Woodman (USA) 1983	Playmate (USA); 1975	Intriguing	Swaps
Sire Woodman (USA) 1983	Playmate (USA); 1975	Intriguing	Glamour
Dam Jode (USA) 1989	Danzig (USA); 1977	Northern Dancer	Nearctic
Dam Jode (USA) 1989	Danzig (USA); 1977	Northern Dancer	Natalma
Dam Jode (USA) 1989	Danzig (USA); 1977	Pas de Nom	Admiral's Voyage
Dam Jode (USA) 1989	Danzig (USA); 1977	Pas de Nom	Petitioner
Dam Jode (USA) 1989	Belle de Jour (USA); 1973	Speak John	Prince John
Dam Jode (USA) 1989	Belle de Jour (USA); 1973	Speak John	Nuits de Folies
Dam Jode (USA) 1989	Belle de Jour (USA); 1973	Battle Dress	Jaipur
Dam Jode (USA) 1989	Belle de Jour (USA); 1973	Battle Dress	Armorial (Family:1-s)
