= Barathea (horse) =

Irish-bred Thoroughbred racehorse

- Racing silks of Sheikh Mohammed
- Sire: Sadler's Wells
- Grandsire: Northern Dancer
- Dam: Brocade
- Damsire: Habitat
- Sex: Stallion
- Foaled: 2 March 1990
- Country: Ireland
- Colour: Bay
- Breeder: Gerald W Leigh
- Owner: Sheikh Mohammed
- Trainer: Luca Cumani
- Record: 16: 5-4-0
- Earnings: £833,277

Major wins
- Irish 2,000 Guineas (1993); Queen Anne Stakes (1994); Breeders' Cup Mile (1994)

Awards
- European Horse of the Year (1994); European Champion Older Horse (1994)
- Last updated on September 13, 2008

Barathea (2 March 1990 – 14 May 2009) was an Irish-bred, British-trained Thoroughbred racehorse. In a racing career which lasted from October 1992 until November 1993 he ran sixteen times and won five races. In 1994 Barathea won the Breeders' Cup Mile at Churchill Downs and was named European Horse of the Year at the Cartier Racing Awards. He went on to become a successful stallion.

== Background ==
Barathea was a handsome, powerful, 16.1 hand bay colt bred in Ireland by Gerald W Leigh (1930–2002). He was sired by the fourteen times champion Sadler's Wells, his dam being the successful racemare Brocade, winner of the Prix de la Forêt. Brocade also produced the Irish 1,000 Guineas winner Gossamer and the Summer Stakes winner Free at Last He was bought as a foal by Sheikh Mohammed and later sent into training with Luca Cumani at Newmarket.

== Racing career ==
=== 1992: two-year-old season ===
Barathea was undefeated in two starts as a two-year-old in October 1992, beating a field including the future Derby Italiano winner White Muzzle in the Westley Maiden Stakes at Newmarket, and following up in the Houghton Stakes over the same course and distance two weeks later.

=== 1993: three-year-old season ===
These performances attracted a good deal of attention, and he was sent off odds-on for his three-year-old debut in the Craven Stakes. He could only finish a disappointing fourth behind Emperor Jones and Wharf, but was beaten less than a length and was still regarded as a contender for the 2000 Guineas. In the classic two weeks later, he was sent off 10/1 third favourite. He reversed the Craven form with Emperor Jones and Wharf, and proved the best of the British colts, but was no match for the French champion, Zafonic, who beat him into second place by three and a half lengths.

His performance led to his being sent off 4/7 favourite for the Irish 2,000 Guineas at the Curragh. He took the lead inside the final furlong and stayed on strongly to hold off the late challenge of the Vincent O'Brien-trained Fatherland by a head. After the race Luca Cumani was reported to be delighted, and suggested that the colt would improve further by referring to him as "still a baby".

The summer saw Barathea being tried as a middle-distance performer, but he failed to stay the distance when fading into fifth place in the Derby and was the well-beaten favourite behind Opera House in the Eclipse. Switched back to a mile he finished fourth behind Kingmambo in the Prix du Moulin, second to Bigstone in the Queen Elizabeth II Stakes and fifth to Lure in his first attempt at the Breeder's Cup Mile.

=== 1994 four-year-old season ===
He had proved himself to be a consistent, high-class colt, but better was to come. He began his four-year-old campaign at Royal Ascot in the Queen Anne Stakes (then a Group Two race). Always running prominently, he took the lead in the closing stages and stayed on to beat Emperor Jones by a neck. After the race Cumani announced that he would aim the colt at the top European races, and that the Breeder's cup was only an "afterthought".

Barathea then proved his ability to compete at a range of distances by finishing a close fourth against specialist sprinters in the July Cup. He was thereafter campaigned exclusively at a mile. A narrow defeat to the three-year-old Distant View in the Sussex Stakes, was followed by a disappointing effort behind East of the Moon in the Prix Jacques Le Marois. In the Queen Elizabeth II Stakes, Barathea defeated several of the best European milers including Bigstone, Distant View and East of the Moon, but was unable to catch the front-running 66-1 outsider Maroof. As the only horse in the field without a previous Group One win, Maroof had been regarded as "cannon fodder" and the result was greeted with "universal amazement".

For the Breeders' Cup Mile, Barathea was given a meticulous preparation. Luca Cumani constructed a replica of the Churchill Downs track layout at his base in Newmarket, giving the colt experience of the tight circuit, and shipped him out earlier than the other British runners in order to acclimatise. Facing a strong field of North American and European milers, he was made 10.4-1 fourth choice in the betting behind the odds-on favourite Lure. He was always prominent, moved into the lead at the start of the straight whilst still "cruising", and pulled away to win by three lengths.

== Assessment ==
In the 1994 Cartier Awards Barathea was named European Champion Older Horse and European Horse of the Year. Timeform rated him 107p as a two-year-old, 124 as a three-year-old and 127 as a four-year-old.

== Stud career ==
Barathea stood as a stallion at the Rathbarry Stud at Fermoy, County Cork. He was much sought after from the start of his stud career and proved successful, siring the winners of more than 700 races. His best winners included Tobougg, Stotsfold (Brigadier Gerard Stakes), Enrique (Greenham Stakes), Tante Rose, Barshiba (Lancashire Oaks), Apsis (Prix du Chemin de Fer du Nord), Barathea Guest (Greenham Stakes), Sina Cova (Noblesse Stakes), Silk Blossom (Lowther Stakes), Hazarista (Blue Wind Stakes) and Opera Cape (Solario Stakes).

Barathea was euthanized after suffering complications from laminitis in May 2009 and was buried at the Rathbarry Stud.

== Pedigree ==
Pedigree of Barathea (IRE), bay stallion, 1990
Sire Sadler's Wells (USA) 1981	Northern Dancer; 1961	Nearctic	Nearco
Sire Sadler's Wells (USA) 1981	Northern Dancer; 1961	Nearctic	Lady Angela
Sire Sadler's Wells (USA) 1981	Northern Dancer; 1961	Natalma	Native Dancer
Sire Sadler's Wells (USA) 1981	Northern Dancer; 1961	Natalma	Almahmoud
Sire Sadler's Wells (USA) 1981	Fairy Bridge; 1975	Bold Reason	Hail To Reason
Sire Sadler's Wells (USA) 1981	Fairy Bridge; 1975	Bold Reason	Lalun
Sire Sadler's Wells (USA) 1981	Fairy Bridge; 1975	Special	Forli
Sire Sadler's Wells (USA) 1981	Fairy Bridge; 1975	Special	Thong
Dam Brocade (GB) 1981	Habitat; 1966	Sir Gaylord	Turn-To
Dam Brocade (GB) 1981	Habitat; 1966	Sir Gaylord	Somethingroyal
Dam Brocade (GB) 1981	Habitat; 1966	Little Hut	Occupy
Dam Brocade (GB) 1981	Habitat; 1966	Little Hut	Savage Beauty
Dam Brocade (GB) 1981	Canton Silk; 1970	Runnymede	Petition
Dam Brocade (GB) 1981	Canton Silk; 1970	Runnymede	Dutch Clover
Dam Brocade (GB) 1981	Canton Silk; 1970	Clouded Lamp	Nimbus
Dam Brocade (GB) 1981	Canton Silk; 1970	Clouded Lamp	Kepwick (Family: 14-a)
