= Tante Rose =

Irish-bred Thoroughbred racehorse

- Sire: Barathea
- Grandsire: Sadler's Wells
- Dam: My Branch
- Damsire: Distant Relative
- Sex: Mare
- Foaled: 10 April 2000
- Country: Ireland
- Colour: Bay
- Breeder: Addison Racing Ltd Inc
- Owner: Wafic Said; Bjorn Nielsen
- Trainer: Barry Hills; Roger Charlton
- Record: 13: 5-0-2
- Earnings: £225,546

Major wins
- Fred Darling Stakes (2003); Cecil Frail Stakes (2004); Summer Stakes (2004); Haydock Sprint Cup (2004)

Tante Rose (foaled 10 April 2000) was an Irish-bred, British-trained Thoroughbred racehorse and broodmare best known for her performances over sprint distances. She won a maiden race on her second start as a two-year-old and then took the Fred Darling Stakes on her three-year-old debut but failed to win again in 2003. In the following year she was unbeaten in three races, winning the Cecil Frail Stakes and the Summer Stakes before ending her racing career with a victory in the Haydock Sprint Cup.

== Background ==
Tante Rose was a bay mare with a white blaze bred in Ireland by her owner, Wafic Said's Addison Racing. She was sent into training with Barry Hills at Lambourn in Berkshire, and was ridden in most of her races by her trainer's son Michael Hills.

Tante Rose was sired by Barathea a specialist miler who was named European Horse of the Year in 1994, a year in which he won the Breeders' Cup Mile. He became a successful stallion, siring the winners of over seven hundred races, although only seven of these were at Group One level. Tante Rose's dam My Branch was a successful racemare who won the Firth of Clyde Stakes and the Sceptre Stakes as well as finishing second in the Cheveley Park Stakes and third in the Irish 1,000 Guineas. As a broodmare she produced several other winners including the Sweet Solera Stakes winner Bay Tree. She was a descendant of the British broodmare Crystal Palace, making her a female-line relative of Royal Palace, Fairy Footsteps, Light Cavalry, Stylish Century and Desert Prince.

== Racing career ==
=== 2002: two-year-old season ===
Tante Rose made her racecourse debut in a maiden race over seven furlongs at Leicester Racecourse on 14 October and finished third of the sixteen runners behind the Michael Stoute-trained Fantasize. On 1 November the filly started 6/4 favourite for a six furlong maiden at Newmarket Racecourse and recorded her first success, taking the lead a quarter of a mile from the finish and going clear to win by three and a half lengths from Ben Lomond.

=== 2003: three-year-old season ===
On her first appearance as a three-year-old Tante Rose contested the Fred Darling Stakes (a major trial race for the 1000 Guineas) over seven furlongs at Newbury Racecourse. She started the 6/1 fourth choice in the betting behind Crystal Star (Radley Stakes), Cassis (runner-up in the Cherry Hinton Stakes) and Rag Top (C L Weld Park Stakes). She started slowly but was switched right by Michael Hills to race up the stands-side rail and began to make rapid progress. She took the lead in the final furlong and won "readily" by a length and a quarter from Crystal Star. In the 1000 Guineas at Newmarket on 4 May she started at odds of 14/1 and made little impact, finishing sixteenth of the nineteen runners behind Russian Rhythm.

Tante Rose was dropped back in distance for her subsequent starts but failed to win again in 2003. She finished sixth in the Jersey Stakes at Royal Ascot and eighth when a 66/1 outsider for the July Cup at Newmarket but produced an improved effort when beaten a head and a neck into third place in the Lennox Stakes at Goodwood Racecourse on 29 July. In her three remaining races she finished seventh in the Prix Maurice de Gheest, fourth in the Park Stakes and seventh in the Challenge Stakes.

Wafic Saïd gave up his racing interests in 2003, citing his non-residence in England as the reason. In December 2003 Tante Rose was offered for sale at Tattersalls and was bought for 350,000 guineas by Blandford Bloodstock. She entered the ownership of Bjorn Nielsen and was transferred to the stable of Roger Charlton at Beckhampton, Wiltshire.

=== 2004: four-year-old season ===
Tante Rose began her third season in the Listed Cecil Frail Stakes at Haydock Park on 5 June in which she was ridden by Steve Drowne. Starting the 7/4 favourite in a field of eleven fillies and mares she was restrained in the early stages before taking the lead inside the final furlong and winning by a neck from the three-year-old Ruby Rocket. On 9 July Tante Rose faced Ruby Rocket again in the Group Three Summer Stakes over six furlongs at York Racecourse. The other runners included Ringmoor Down (Lansdown Fillies' Stakes), Lochridge (Flying Fillies' Stakes), Silca's Gift (Nell Gwyn Stakes) and Vita Spericolata (Queensferry Stakes). With Michael Hills in the saddle, she was held up in the early stages before moving smoothly up to take the lead inside the final furlong. She won in "impressive" style by two and a half lengths from Ruby Rocket with Lochridge in third place.

On 4 September, Tante Rose was stepped up to Group One level for the Stanleybet Sprint Cup at Haydock and started at odds of 10/1 in a nineteen-runner field. One Cool Cat started favourite whilst the other runners included Frizzante, Somnus, Airwave, Bahamian Pirate, Patavellian (Prix de l'Abbaye), Ratio (Wokingham Stakes), Ashdown Express (Bentinck Stakes), Monsieur Bond (Duke of York Stakes), Royal Millennium (Chipchase Stakes) and Lochridge. Ridden by Richard Hughes, she settled in mid-division as the 66/1 outsider Welsh Emperor set the pace. Somnus went to the front in the final furlong but Tante Rose produced a strong late run to take the lead in the final stride and won by a short head. Patavellian finished third ahead of Royal Millennium and Monsieur Bond. Roger Charlton admitted that he was "gobsmacked" by the performance after many of his horses had been suffering from a respiratory infection. He explained "I can't believe it's happened really. Each day has been a nightmare, wondering if she was going to be the next one to cough. She's been in isolation for two weeks, but these viral things are very hard to detect. When we've been going out, I've been waiting for the girl to say, 'she's coughed guv'nor'." He added that the filly "has a fantastic turn of foot and she loves the soft ground".

== Breeding record ==
Tante Rose was retired from racing to become a broodmare for Nielsen's stud. In December 2007 the seven-year-old mare was offered for sale at Tattersalls but was bought back by her vendor, the Kiltinan Stud, when the bidding stopped at 900,000 guineas.

Her only recorded foal has been Rose Diamond, a grey filly foaled in 2006 and sired by Daylami. She won two minor races, finished second in the Prestige Stakes. and went on to produce the Grade III winner Real Smart.

== Pedigree ==
Pedigree of Tante Rose (IRE), bay mare, 2000
Sire Barathea (IRE) 1990	Sadler's Wells (USA); 1981	Northern Dancer	Nearctic
Sire Barathea (IRE) 1990	Sadler's Wells (USA); 1981	Northern Dancer	Natalma
Sire Barathea (IRE) 1990	Sadler's Wells (USA); 1981	Fairy Bridge	Bold Reason
Sire Barathea (IRE) 1990	Sadler's Wells (USA); 1981	Fairy Bridge	Special
Sire Barathea (IRE) 1990	Brocade (GB); 1981	Habitat	Sir Gaylord
Sire Barathea (IRE) 1990	Brocade (GB); 1981	Habitat	Little Hut
Sire Barathea (IRE) 1990	Brocade (GB); 1981	Canton Silk	Runnymede
Sire Barathea (IRE) 1990	Brocade (GB); 1981	Canton Silk	Clouded Lamp
Dam My Branch (GB) 1993	Distant Relative (IRE); 1986	Habitat	Sir Gaylord
Dam My Branch (GB) 1993	Distant Relative (IRE); 1986	Habitat	Little Hut
Dam My Branch (GB) 1993	Distant Relative (IRE); 1986	Royal Sister	Claude
Dam My Branch (GB) 1993	Distant Relative (IRE); 1986	Royal Sister	Ribasha
Dam My Branch (GB) 1993	Pay the Bank (GB); 1987	High Top	Derring-Do
Dam My Branch (GB) 1993	Pay the Bank (GB); 1987	High Top	Camenae
Dam My Branch (GB) 1993	Pay the Bank (GB); 1987	Hopespringseternal	Run the Gantlet
Dam My Branch (GB) 1993	Pay the Bank (GB); 1987	Hopespringseternal	Ash Lawn (Family: 1-s)

- Tante Rose was inbred 3 × 3 to Habitat meaning that this stallion appears twice in the third generation of her pedigree.
