= Pips Pride =

British-bred Thoroughbred racehorse

- Sire: Efisio
- Grandsire: Formidable
- Dam: Elkie Brooks
- Damsire: Relkino
- Sex: Stallion
- Foaled: 9 April 1990
- Country: United Kingdom
- Colour: Chestnut
- Breeder: Ronald & J H Popely
- Owner: Mrs V S Grant
- Trainer: Richard Hannon Sr.
- Record: 13: 6-1-2
- Earnings: £316,402

Major wins
- Phoenix Stakes (1992); Racecall Gold Trophy (1992); Leisure Stakes (1993); Grosser Preis von Berlin (1993)

Awards
- Timeform rating 117

Pips Pride (9 April 1990 – 1996) was a British Thoroughbred racehorse and sire. A specialist sprinter, he won six of his thirteen races in a track career which lasted from April 1992 until September 1993. As a two-year-old he won the Group 1 Phoenix Stakes and the valuable Racecall Gold Trophy as well as being placed in the Middle Park Stakes, Coventry Stakes and July Stakes. In the following year he won the Leisure Stakes and the Grosser Preis von Berlin before being retired from racing at the end of the year. He made a very promising to his start career as a breeding stallion but died at the age of six.

== Background ==
Pips Pride was a chestnut horse with a small white star bred in England by Ronald Popely. As a yearling he was put up for auction and sold for 15,000 guineas. During his racing career he was owned by Mrs V S Grant and trained by Richard Hannon Sr. at East Everleigh in Wiltshire.

He was sired by Efisio, who won seven races including the Horris Hill Stakes, Challenge Stakes and Premio Emilio Turati. Efisio, who was also owned by Popely for part of his stud career, sired the winners of almost a thousand races including twelve at Group 1 level. Pips Pride's dam Elkie Brooks showed little racing ability, failing to win in eight starts. She was distantly descended from the influential British broodmare Black Cherry.

== Racing career ==
=== 1992: two-year-old season ===
Pips Pride made his racecourse debut in a maiden race over five furlongs at Kempton Park Racecourse on 18 April when he was ridden by Willie Carson. Starting at odds of 11/2 he took the lead soon after half way and quickly drew away from his ten opponents to win by eight lengths. Eleven days later, with Pat Eddery in the saddle, he followed up in the Garter Stakes at Ascot, leading from the start to win from two rivals.

Pips Pride was then stepped up in class and distance for the Group 3 Coventry Stakes at Royal Ascot in June and finished third behind Petardia and So Factual. In the following month he ran third to Wharf in the July Stakes at Newmarket, but then ran disappointingly when coming home fifth of the six runners behind his stablemate Son Pardo in the Richmond Stakes at Goodwood. The colt was then sent to Ireland to contest the Group 1 Phoenix Stakes at Leopardstown Racecourse on 9 August and started at odds of 10/1 behind Son Pardo, who was made the 2/1 favourite. The other fancied runners included Tropical (Curragh Stakes), Splendent (winner of his last two races) and Ivory Frontier (Railway Stakes). Partnered by Frankie Dettori, who had never ridden at the course before, Pips Pride was among the leaders from the start and won by three quarters of a length and a neck from Shahik and Darbonne. Commenting on the colt's improved form, Richard Hannon said "Pips Pride loves to get out and bowl along. They didn't go fast at Goodwood, he pulled hard and gave himself no real chance. This time he was drawn on the right side and Frankie let him stride on".

In September Pips Pride ran in the Mill Reef Stakes at Newbury Racecourse and finished fourth of the seven runners behind Forest Wind, Marina Park and Sharp Prod. In the Group 1 Middle Park Stakes at Newmarket on 1 October the colt started at odds of 12/1 and led for most of the way before being overtake in the closing stages and beaten a length into second by the French-trained Zieten. The Racecall Gold Trophy, a handicap race run over six furlongs at Redcar Racecourse on 27 October was one of the most valuable juvenile races in Europe and attracted a field of twenty-four runners. Unlike a conventional handicap, the weights were determined by the prices fetched by the offspring of the runners sires at auction, giving an advantage to the progeny of cheap or unfashionable stallions. The race was run in exceptionally testing conditions on very heavy ground on a cold, wet day. Ridden by Dean McKeown and carrying 117 pounds Pips Pride was made the 6/1 second favourite. Racing up the left hand side of the course (from the jockeys' viewpoint), he was amongst the leaders from the start, opened up a clear advantage a furlong out and kept on well to win by a length from his stablemate Revelation.

=== 1993: three-year-old season ===
Pips Pride began his second campaign on 22 May at Lingfield Park in the Listed Leisure Stakes in which he was matched against older horses. Ridden by Steve Raymont he led from the start and held off a strong challenge from the four-year-old filly Branston Abby to win by a head. In the Group 3 Cork and Orrery Stakes at Royal Ascot he started third favourite but faded badly in the closing stages and finished unplaced behind College Chapel.

After a break of seven weeks Pips Pride returned for the Group 3 Grosser Preis von Berlin (not the current race of the same name) over 1300 metres at Hoppegarten in Brandenburg, Germany. With Raymont in the saddle he took the lead soon after the start and pulled clear in the closing stages to win by three lengths from Nasr Allah. On his final appearance Pips Pride started a 16/1 outsider for the Haydock Sprint Cup on firm ground and finished fifth of the seven runners behind Wolfhound.

== Stud record ==
Pips Pride was retired from racing to become a breeding stallion but died in 1996 at the age of six after siring only three crops of foals. Despite the brevity of his stud career he had considerable success, siring winners including Pipalong, Cortachy Castle (Sprint Stakes) and Guinea Hunter (Stewards' Cup).

== Pedigree ==
Pedigree of Pips Pride (GB), chestnut stallion, 1990
Sire Efisio (GB) 1982	Formidable (USA); 1975	Forli	Aristophanes
Sire Efisio (GB) 1982	Formidable (USA); 1975	Forli	Trevisa
Sire Efisio (GB) 1982	Formidable (USA); 1975	Native Partner	Raise a Native
Sire Efisio (GB) 1982	Formidable (USA); 1975	Native Partner	Dinner Partner
Sire Efisio (GB) 1982	Eldoret (IRE); 1976	High Top	Derring-Do
Sire Efisio (GB) 1982	Eldoret (IRE); 1976	High Top	Camenae
Sire Efisio (GB) 1982	Eldoret (IRE); 1976	Bamburi	Ragusa
Sire Efisio (GB) 1982	Eldoret (IRE); 1976	Bamburi	Kilifi
Dam Elkie Brooks (GB) 1981	Relkino (GB); 1973	Relko	Tanerko
Dam Elkie Brooks (GB) 1981	Relkino (GB); 1973	Relko	Relance
Dam Elkie Brooks (GB) 1981	Relkino (GB); 1973	Pugnacity	Pampered King
Dam Elkie Brooks (GB) 1981	Relkino (GB); 1973	Pugnacity	Ballynulta
Dam Elkie Brooks (GB) 1981	Creset (GB); 1972	Henry the Seventh	King of the Tudors
Dam Elkie Brooks (GB) 1981	Creset (GB); 1972	Henry the Seventh	Vestal Girl
Dam Elkie Brooks (GB) 1981	Creset (GB); 1972	Quoff	Quorum
Dam Elkie Brooks (GB) 1981	Creset (GB); 1972	Quoff	Battle Off (Family: 3-o)
