= Sunspangled =

Irish-bred Thoroughbred racehorse

- Sire: Caerleon
- Grandsire: Nijinsky
- Dam: Fiilia Ardross
- Damsire: Ardross
- Sex: Mare
- Foaled: 10 May 1996
- Country: Ireland
- Colour: Chestnut
- Breeder: Klaus Rohde & Katom Ltd
- Owner: Michael Tabor & Sue Magnier
- Trainer: Aidan O'Brien
- Record: 10: 2-2-0
- Earnings: £151,534

Major wins
- Fillies' Mile (1998)

Sunspangled (foaled 10 May 1996) was an Irish thoroughbred racehorse and broodmare. In a racing career which lasted from July 1998 until September 1999, she won twice and finished second twice in ten starts. As a two-year-old, she won on her debut but was beaten in her next two races before recording her most important victory in the Group One Fillies' Mile at Ascot Racecourse. In the following year, she was campaigned exclusively in Group One events and failed to win, although she did finish second in the Irish Oaks. She has made little impact as a broodmare.

== Background ==
Sunspangled was a chestnut mare with a large white star and a white sock on her left hind foot bred in Ireland by Klaus Rohde & Katom Ltd. Her sire, Caerleon, won the Prix du Jockey Club and the Benson & Hedges Gold Cup in 1983 and went on to become an "excellent" stallion, siring the winners of more than 700 races including Generous, Marienbard, Moonax and Warrsan. Her dam Sunspangled was a high-class racemare whose wins included the Preis der Diana in 1989 and was rated 121 by Timeform. Before foaling Sunspangled she had produced French Ballerina who won two editions of the Saval Beg Stakes and was later successful over hurdles. She was descended from Overture, a British broodmare who was the ancestor of many major winners including Supreme Court, Marwell, Unite and Paean.

In September 1997, the yearling filly was consigned by the Barronstown Stud to the Tattersalls sale, where she was bought for 75,000 guineas by bloodstock agent Dermot "Demi" O'Byrne on behalf of John Magnier's Coolmore organisation. Like many Coolmore horses she was sent into training with Aidan O'Brien at Ballydoyle. The details of her ownership changed from race to race: she was sometimes listed and as the property of Michael Tabor, whilst in other races she raced in the ownership of a partnership between Tabor and Susan Magnier.

== Racing career ==
=== 1998: two-year-old season ===
On her racecourse debut, Sunspangled was one of eleven fillies to contest a seven-furlong maiden race at Galway Races and started at odds of 13/2. Ridden by Christy Roche, she was settled in seventh place before moving into second place on the final turn. She overtook the Jim Bolger-trained favourite St Clair Ridge in the closing stages and won by a neck with Institutrice half a length away in third. The filly was then moved up in class for the Listed Debutante Stakes at Leopardstown Racecourse on 23 August. Starting the 9/4 second favourite, she took the lead in the straight but was overtaken a furlong out and beaten one and a half lengths by the John Oxx-trained Edabiya. Richard Hughes took over from Roche when Sunspangled stepped up in class again for the Group One Moyglare Stud Stakes at the Curragh two weeks later. She briefly took the lead in the last quarter mile but was outpaced in the closing stages and finished fifth behind Edabiya, Fear And Greed, Crystal Downs, and Wannabe Grand.

For her final race of the year, Sunspangled was sent to England for the Group One Fillies' Mile on soft ground at Ascot Racecourse on 27 September. Edabiya started favourite ahead of the May Hill Stakes winner Calando and the highly regarded maiden winner Alabaq with Sunspangled the 9/1 fourth choice in an eight-runner field which also included the Prestige Stakes runner-up Choirgirl. She was ridden for the first time by Mick Kinane, who partnered her in all her subsequent races. She was restrained by Kinane in the early stages as Choirgirl set the pace, before moving into contention approaching the final turn. Ebadiya took the lead in the straight, but Sunspangled stayed on strongly under pressure to take the lead inside the final furlong and held off a late challenge from Calando to win by a neck with the favourite a short head away in third. The first three finished nine lengths clear of Alabaq in fourth place. Kinane commented, "The plan was to be a bit more patient and she showed she is a good filly who will stay. She should improve physically and she has the temperament to carry her through".

=== 1999: three-year-old season ===
On her first appearance as a three-year-old, Sunspangled was sent to Newmarket Racecourse for the 186th running of the 1000 Guineas over the Rowley Mile on 2 May. Despite not having a trial race, she started the 7/1 third favourite behind Wince and the French-trained Moiava but was never in serious contention and finished fifteenth of the twenty-two runners. In the Irish 1,000 Guineas three weeks later, she briefly reached third place in the straight before fading into seventh behind Hula Angel. For her next three races, Sunspangled was moved up in distance to compete one and a half miles, with mixed results. In The Oaks on 4 June, she finished sixth behind the Henry Cecil-trained Ramruma (O'Brien felt that she did not cope with the undulating track) but in July she was second to the same filly in the Irish Oaks at the Curragh. She was unable to trouble Ramruma in the Yorkshire Oaks in August and finished tenth of the eleven runners. On her final appearance, Sunspangled was matched against male opposition in the Irish Champion Stakes at Leopardstown Racecourse. She started a 40/1 outsider and finished last of the seven runners behind Daylami.

== Breeding record ==
Sunspangled was retired from racing to become a broodmare for the Coolmore associate Tower Bloodstock, before being acquired by Sheikh Mohammed's Darley Stud. She produced at least six foals between 2001 and 2011:

- Vendors Mistake, a bay filly, foaled in 2001, sired by Danehill. Failed to win in nineteen races.
- Summer Love, bay filly, 2005, by Dubai Destination. Second in only race: died in 2008.
- Apollo Moon, chestnut colt (later gelded), 2006, by Selkirk. Unraced.
- Sunbow, chestnut colt, by 2007, by Dubawi. Finished first in one race, but disqualified.
- Al Battani, chestnut colt (later gelded), 2009, by Street Cry. Unraced.
- Sequined, bay filly, 2011, by Street Cry. Won two races.

== Pedigree ==
Pedigree of Sunspangled (IRE), chestnut mare, 1996
Sire Caerleon (USA) 1980	Nijinsky (CAN); 1967	Northern Dancer	Nearctic
Sire Caerleon (USA) 1980	Nijinsky (CAN); 1967	Northern Dancer	Natalma
Sire Caerleon (USA) 1980	Nijinsky (CAN); 1967	Flaming Page	Bull Page
Sire Caerleon (USA) 1980	Nijinsky (CAN); 1967	Flaming Page	Flaring Top
Sire Caerleon (USA) 1980	Foreseer (USA); 1969	Round Table	Princequillo
Sire Caerleon (USA) 1980	Foreseer (USA); 1969	Round Table	Knight's Daughter
Sire Caerleon (USA) 1980	Foreseer (USA); 1969	Regal Gleam	Hail To Reason
Sire Caerleon (USA) 1980	Foreseer (USA); 1969	Regal Gleam	Miz Carol
Dam Filia Ardross (GB) 1986	Ardross (IRE); 1976	Run the Gantlet	Tom Rolfe
Dam Filia Ardross (GB) 1986	Ardross (IRE); 1976	Run the Gantlet	First Feather
Dam Filia Ardross (GB) 1986	Ardross (IRE); 1976	Le Melody	Levmoss
Dam Filia Ardross (GB) 1986	Ardross (IRE); 1976	Le Melody	Arctic Melody
Dam Filia Ardross (GB) 1986	Sari Habit (IRE); 1978	Saritamer	Dancer's Image
Dam Filia Ardross (GB) 1986	Sari Habit (IRE); 1978	Saritamer	Irish Chorus
Dam Filia Ardross (GB) 1986	Sari Habit (IRE); 1978	Habitee	Habitat
Dam Filia Ardross (GB) 1986	Sari Habit (IRE); 1978	Habitee	Chara (Family: 14-c)
