= Cecil Frail Stakes =

Flat hrose race in Britain

Cecil Frail Stakes
2026
Rosy Affair	Magic Basma	Lady Youmzain

Previous years
2025
Frost At Dawn	Prime Art	Nighteyes
2024
Electric Storm	Sophia's Starlight	Midream
2023
Get Ahead	Kape Moss	Aramis Grey
2022
Sense Of Duty	Flotus	Benefit
2021
Twilight Spinner	Ventura Diamond	Mamba Wamba

2020-2011
2020
Liberty Beach	Queen Jo Jo	Maid In India
2019
Forever In Dreams	Solar Gold	Heavenly Holly
2018
Classical Times	Raven's Lady	Different League
2017
Buying Trouble	Bounce	Futoon
2016
Jane's Memory	Ridge Ranger	Interception
2015
Blhadawa	Interception	Explosive Lady
2014
Joyeuse	Gathering Power	Perfect Blessings
2013
Artistic Jewel	Gracia Directa	Hoyam
2012
Inetrobil	Artistic Jewel	Ladies Are Forever
2011
Anne Of Kiev	Dubai Media	Show Rainbow

2010-2001
2010
Beyond Desire	Astrophysical Jet	Excellerator
2009
Festoso	Pusey Street Lady	Never Lose
2008
Perfect Polly	Aine	Crystany
2007
Cartimandua	Ripples Maid	Riotous Applause
2006
Paradise Isle	Nidhaal	Clear Impression
2005
Indian Maiden	Slip Dance	Echelon
2004
Tante Rose	Ruby Rocket	Golden Nun
2003
Topkamp	Valiantly	Entrap
2002
Marika	Palace Affair	Agrippina
2001
Summerhill Parkes	Hot Tin Roof	Damalis

2000-1999
2000
Pipalong	Romanylei	Seraphina
1999
Antinnaz	Pipalong	Saphire

The Cecil Frail Stakes is a Listed flat horse race in Great Britain open to mares and fillies aged three years or older. It is run at Haydock Park over a distance of 6 furlongs (1,206 metres), and it is scheduled to take place each year in May.

The race was first run in 1999. Until 1996 the name Cecil Frail was given to a rated handicap at the same course.

== Winners ==
Year	Winner	Age	Jockey	Trainer	Time
1999	Antinnaz	3	Jamie Spencer	Tommy Stack	1:14.60
2000	Pipalong	4	Kevin Darley	Tim Easterby	1:15.49
2001	Summerhill Parkes	3	Michael Tebbutt	Michael Jarvis	1:14.92
2002	Marika	4	Darryll Holland	Geoff Wragg	1:18.13
2003	Topkamp	3	Micky Fenton	Michael Bell	1:12.04
2004	Tante Rose	4	Steve Drowne	Roger Charlton	1:13.75
2005	Indian Maiden	5	Fran Berry	Malcolm Saunders	1:14.28
2006	Paradise Isle	5	Kevin Darley	Chris Wall	1:10.69
2007	Cartimandua	3	Graham Gibbons	Ed McMahon	1:12.16
2008	Perfect Polly	3	Shane Kelly	Jeremy Noseda	1:33.44
2009	Festoso	4	Steve Drowne	Harry Dunlop	1:19.74
2010	Beyond Desire	3	Neil Callan	Michael Jarvis	1:12.70
2011	Anne Of Kiev	6	Pat Cosgrave	Jeremy Gask	1:10.99
2012	Inetrobil	3	Phillip Makin	Kevin Ryan	1:11.87
2013	Artistic Jewel	4	Graham Lee	Ed McMahon	1:11.60
2014	Joyeuse	3	Ryan Moore	Lady Cecil	1:14.63
2015	Blhadawa	4	Luke Morris	James Tate	1:13.69
2016	Jane's Memory	4	Richard Kingscote	Rae Guest	1:13.71
2017	Buying Trouble	4	Andrew Mullen	David Evans	1:10.80
2018	Classical Times	4	Jack Mitchell	Peter Chapple-Hyam	1:09.94
2019	Forever In Dreams	3	Martin Dwyer	Aidan Fogarty	1:12.29
2020 (Note: The 2020 race was run in June due to the COVID-19 pandemic in the United Kingdom)	Liberty Beach	3	Jason Hart	John Quinn	1:13.15
2021	Twilight Spinner	3	Shane Gray	David O'Meara	1:19.17
2022	Sense of Duty	3	Cieren Fallon	William Haggas	1:10.39
2023	Get Ahead	4	Richard Kingscote	Clive Cox	1:13.53
2024	Electric Storm	4	Daniel Tudhope	James Tate	1:16.86
2025	Frost At Dawn	4	Oisin Murphy	William Knight	1:13.54
2026	Rosy Affair	5	Billy Loughnane	George Boughey	1:14.94

== See also ==
- Horse racing in Great Britain
- List of British flat horse races
