= Empress Stakes =

Flat horse race in Britain

Empress Stakes
2026
Havana Sprite	Glorious Game	The Can Can Queen

Previous years
2025
Argentine Tango	Midnight Tango	Bella Lyra
2024
Celandine	Tales Of The Heart	Arabian Dusk
2023
Star Of Mystery	Cry Fiction	Unbreak My Heart
2022
Lezoo	Malrescia	Tagline
2021
System	Desert Dreamer	Cachet

2020-2011
2020
Time Scale	Concessions	Undertake
2019
Summer Romance	Ursulina	Companion
2018
Royal Intervention	Strings Of Life	Impulsion
2017
Dance Diva	Maggies Angel	So Hi Society
2016
Nations Alexander	Hellofahaste	Marie Of Lyon
2015
Katie's Diamond	White Bullet	Bournemouth Belle
2014
Calypso Beat	Parsley	Tigrilla
2013
Fig Roll	Ventura Mist	Love In The Desert
2012
City Image	Sandreamer	Baileys Jubilee
2011
Lily's Angel	Pearl Diva	Misty Conquest

2010-2001
2010
Khor Sheed	Shoshoni Wind	Imperialistic Diva
2009
Jira	Jeanie Johnston	Electric Feel
2008
Baileys Cacao	Select	Aunt Nicola
2007
Polar Circle	Thought Is Free	Highland Daughter
2006
Hope'n'charity	Satulagi	My Lovely Lesley
2005
Dixie Belle	Skyelady	Playful
2004
Slip Dance	Royal Alchemist	Golden Anthem
2003
Pearl Grey	Voile	Valjarv
2002
Miss Mirasol	Bishop's Lake	Katdogawn
2001
Massarra	Pastel	Izwah

2000-1991
2000
In The Woods	Santolina	Alinga
1999
Hoh Dear	Forever Midnight	Crimplene
1998
Wannabe Grand	Aunt Flo	Miss Universe
1997
Lady In Waiting	Land of Dreams	Silent Tribute
1996
Moonlight Paradise	Queen Sceptre	Eye Shadow
1995
Maid For The Hills	Persian Secret	React
1994
Lovely Millie	The Jotter	Don't Worry Me
1993
Snipe Hall	Rohita	Michelle Hicks
1992
Ivanka	Greenlet	Holly Golightly
1991
Solar Star	Coffee Ice	Baltra

1990-1988
1990
Seductress	Atlantic Flyer	Cloche D'Or
1989
Agri Dagi	Rafha	Dancing Party
1988
Aldbourne	Sure Gold	Hope And Glory

The Empress Stakes is a Listed flat horse race in Great Britain open to two-year-old fillies. It is run on the July Course at Newmarket over a distance of 6 furlongs (1,207 metres), and it is scheduled to take place each year in late June or early July.

During the 1980s the race was known as the Ewar Stud Farm Stakes.

== Winners ==
Year	Winner	Jockey	Trainer	Time
1979	Queens Counsellor	Greville Starkey	Michael Stoute	1:13.67
1980	Chemin	Joe Mercer	Jeremy Hindley	1:13.64
1981	Sing Softly	Paul Cook	Henry Cecil	1:12.92
1982	Bright Crocus	Lester Piggott	Henry Cecil	1:15.95
1983	Pebbles	Philip Robinson	Clive Brittain	1:14.21
1984	Fatah Flare	Lester Piggott	Henry Cecil	1:11.74
1985	Jellygold	Tony Ives	Bill O'Gorman	1:15.54
1986	Twyla	Willie Ryan	Henry Cecil	1:14.38
1987	Diminuendo	Steve Cauthen	Henry Cecil	1:15.07
1988	Aldbourne	Paul Hamblett	Dr Jon Scargill	1:12.61
1989	Agri Dagi	Ray Cochrane	Luca Cumani	1:12.84
1990	Seductress	Walter Swinburn	Michael Stoute	1:14.03
1991	Solar Star	Alan Munro	Michael Bell	1:13.66
1992	Ivanka	Michael Roberts	Clive Brittain	1:14.41
1993	Snipe Hall	Philip Robinson	John Wharton	1:12.52
1994	Lovely Millie	Gary Carter	David Loder	1:13.62
1995	Maid For The Hills	Pat Eddery	David Loder	1:14.31
1996	Moonlight Paradise	Pat Eddery	John Dunlop	1:12.58
1997	Lady In Waiting	Frankie Dettori	Paul Cole	1:14.74
1998	Wannabe Grand	John Reid	Jeremy Noseda	1:14.98
1999	Hoh Dear	Micky Fenton	Michael Bell	1:13.82
2000	In The Woods	George Duffield	David Cosgrove	1:13.14
2001	Massarra	Pat Eddery	John Dunlop	1:13.96
2002	Miss Mirasol	Joe Fanning	Kevin Ryan	1:12.45
2003	Pearl Grey	Frankie Dettori	David Loder	1:12.45
2004	Slip Dance	Kerrin McEvoy	Eamon Tyrrell	1:13.70
2005	Dixie Belle	Tom Queally	Mick Quinlan	1:12.78
2006	Hope'n'charity	Philip Robinson	Clive Cox	1:12.76
2007	Polar Circle	Jimmy Fortune	Peter Chapple-Hyam	1:16.33
2008	Baileys Cacao	Richard Hughes	Richard Hannon Sr.	1:11.66
2009	Jira	Kevin Shea	Clive Brittain	1:12.91
2010	Khor Sheed	Kieren Fallon	Luca Cumani	1:13.23
2011	Lily's Angel	Richard Hughes	Richard Fahey	1:11.99
2012	City Image	Richard Hughes	Richard Hannon Sr.	1:12.51
2013	Fig Roll	Richard Hughes	Richard Hannon Sr.	1:11.62
2014	Calypso Beat	William Buick	Kevin Ryan	1:12.79
2015	Katie's Diamond	Andrea Atzeni	Karl Burke	1:12.41
2016	Nations Alexander	Pat Dobbs	Richard Hannon Jr.	1:18.39
2017	Dance Diva	William Buick	Richard Fahey	1:11.73
2018	Royal Intervention	Gérald Mossé	Ed Walker	1:13.09
2019	Summer Romance	James Doyle	Charlie Appleby	1:12.23
2020 (Note: The 2020 race was run on Newmarket's Rowley Mile course due to the COVID-19 pandemic in the United Kingdom)	Time Scale	Oisin Murphy	Ralph Beckett	1:11.60
2021	System	Pat Dobbs	Richard Hannon Jr.	1:11.91
2022	Lezoo	Frankie Dettori	Ralph Beckett	1:12.52
2023	Star of Mystery	William Buick	Charlie Appleby	1:10.67
2024	Celandine	Tom Marquand	Ed Walker	1:10.52
2025	Argentine Tango	David Allan	Tim Easterby	1:11.24
2026 (dh)	Glorious Game; Havana Sprite	Oisin Murphy; Hector Crouch	Hugo Palmer; James Tate	1:13.41

== See also ==
- Horse racing in Great Britain
- List of British flat horse races
