= Pomfret Stakes =

Flat horse race in Britain

Pomfret Stakes
2026
Holloway Boy	Point Lynas	Mostar Dreams

Previous years
2025
Make Me King	Cicero's Gift	Checkandchallenge
2024
Point Lynas	Regal Reality	Dear My Friend
2023
Poker Face	Flight Plan	Raadobarg
2022
Alflaila	Marie's Diamond	Modern News
2021
Brunch	Rhoscolyn	Azano

2020-2011
2020
Dark Vision	Beringer	Foxtrot Lady
2019
Marie's Diamond	Di Fede	Khafoo Shememi
2018
Big Country	Salateen	Ventura Knight
2017
Another Touch	Custom Cut	Gabrial
2016
Convey	Algaith	Master Carpenter
2015
Mondialiste	Short Squeeze	Birdman
2014
Custom Cut	Tenor	The Rectifier
2013
Fire Ship	Gabrial	Aesop's Fables
2012
Highland Knight	Rugged Cross	Set The Trend
2011
Emerald Commander	St Moritz	Off Chance

2010-2004
2010
Mabait	Rio De La Plata	Harrison George
2009
Khateeb	Orizaba	Perks
2008
Choose Your Moment	Dream Lodge	Easy Target
2007
Blue Ksar	Contentious	Tam Lin
2006
Jubilee Street	Namroud	El Coto
2005
Sound Breeze	Langford	San Antonio
2004
Wing Commander	Vicious Warrior	Calcutta

The Pomfret Stakes is a Listed flat horse race in Great Britain open to horses aged three years or older. It is run at Pontefract over a distance of 1 mile and 6 yards (1,615 metres), and is scheduled to take place each year in July.

The race was first run in 2004, as a handicap. It became a conditions race with Listed status in 2007.

== Records ==
Most successful horse:

- No horse has won this race more than once

Leading jockey (2 wins):

- Royston Ffrench – Sound Breeze (2005, 2006)
- Ted Durcan - Blue Ksar (2007), Emerald Commander (2011)
- Silvestre de Sousa - Big Country (2018), Marie's Diamond (2019)

Leading trainer (3 wins):

- Mark Johnston - Sound Breeze (2005), Marie's Diamond (2019), Dark Vision (2020)
- Saeed bin Suroor – Blue Ksar (2007), Rio De La Plata (2010), Emerald Commander (2011)

== Winners ==
Year	Winner	Age	Jockey	Trainer	Time
2004	Wing Commander	5	Paul Hanagan	Richard Fahey	1:45.20
2005	Sound Breeze	3	Royston Ffrench	Mark Johnston	1:42.93
2006	Jubilee Street	7	Royston Ffrench	Ann Duffield	1:43.18
2007	Blue Ksar	4	Ted Durcan	Saeed bin Suroor	1:48.02
2008	Choose Your Moment (Note: The 2008 winner Choose Your Moment was later exported to Hong Kong and renamed Prime Champion)	3	Eddie Ahern	Patrick Haslam	1:43.01
2009	Khateeb	4	Tadhg O'Shea	Michael Jarvis	1:43.43
2010 (dh)	Mabait; Rio De La Plata	4; 5	Kieren Fallon; Daragh O'Donohoe	Luca Cumani; Saeed bin Suroor	1:43.25
2011	Emerald Commander	4	Ted Durcan	Saeed bin Suroor	1:43.97
2012	Highland Knight	5	David Probert	Andrew Balding	1:41.24
2013	Fire Ship	4	Neil Callan	William Knight	1:44.73
2014	Custom Cut	5	David Nolan	David O'Meara	1:42.06
2015	Mondialiste	5	Danny Tudhope	David O'Meara	1:43.32
2016	Convey	4	Ryan Moore	Michael Stoute	1:41.94
2017	Another Touch	4	Tony Hamilton	Richard Fahey	1:45.42
2018	Big Country	5	Silvestre de Sousa	Michael Appleby	1:45.41
2019	Marie's Diamond	3	Silvestre de Sousa	Mark Johnston	1:45.97
2020	Dark Vision	4	James Doyle	Mark Johnston	1:42.87
2021	Brunch	4	William Buick	Michael Dods	1:43.22
2022	Alflaila	3	Jim Crowley	Owen Burrows	1:44.64
2023	Poker Face	4	James Doyle	Simon & Ed Crisford	1:43.37
2024	Point Lynas	5	Callum Rodriguez	Edward Bethell	1:41.46
2025	Make Me King	5	Daniel Tudhope	Hamad Al Jehani	1:41.31
2026	Holloway Boy	6	Clifford Lee	Karl Burke	1:40.36

== See also ==
- Horse racing in Great Britain
- List of British flat horse races
