= Summer Stakes =

Flat horse race in Britain

- Class: Group 3
- Location: York Racecourse; York, England
- Inaugurated: 1996
- Race type: Flat / Thoroughbred
- Sponsor: William Hill
- Website: York

Race information
- Distance: 6f (1,207 metres)
- Surface: Turf
- Track: Straight
- Qualification: Three-years-old and up fillies & mares
- Weight: 8 st 12 lb (3yo); 9 st 4 lb (4yo+); Penalties; 7 lb for Group 1 winners * 5 lb for Group 2 winners * 3 lb for Group 3 winners * * since 2018 (2yo wins not penalised)
- Purse: £83,615 (2025); 1st: £48,203

Summer Stakes
2026
Flora Of Bermuda	First Instinct	Soul Love

Previous years
2025
Sayidah Dariyan	Nighteyes	Celandine
2024
Flora Of Bermuda	Adaay In Devon	Unequal Love
2023
Swingalong	Royal Aclaim	Gale Force Maya
2022
Flotus	Adaay To Remember	Gale Force Maya
2021
Light Refrain	Vadream	Declaring Love

2020-2011
2020
Queen Jo Jo	Breathtaking Look	Sunday Star
2019
Royal Intervention	Shades Of Blue	Red Balloons
2018
Raven's Lady	Pretty Baby	Pepita
2017
Mystic Dawn	Queen Kindly	Eartha Kitt
2016
Ridge Ranger	Besharah	La Rioja
2015
New Providence	Lucky Kristale	Kiyoshi
2014
Ladies Are Forever	Joyeuse	Indignant
2013
Ladies Are Forever	Gracia Directa	March
2012
Gracia Directa	Sioux Rising	Hallelujah
2011
Ladies Are Forever	Dever Dream	Rose Blossom

2010-2001
2010
Rose Blossom	Tropical Treat	Gilt Edge Girl
2009
Serious Attitude	Lesson In Humility	Look Busy
2008
Our Faye	Lady Grace	San Sicharia
2007
Theann	Gloved Hand	Lady Grace
2006
La Chunga	Donna Blini	Paradise Isle
2005
Lucky Spin	La Cucaracha	Indian Maiden
2004
Tante Rose	Ruby Rocket	Lochridge
2003
Torosay Spring	Golden Nun	Khulood
2002
Palace Affair	Lipstick	Lady Dominatrix
2001
Palace Affair	Night Haven	Vita Spericolata

2000-1996
2000
Hot Tin Roof	Cassandra Go	Jezebel
1999
Imperial Beauty	Pipalong	Fragrant Oasis
1998
Nanoushka	Crazee Mental	Qilin
1997
Bint Albaadiya	Bollin Joanne	Connemara
1996
Carranita	Daring Destiny	Prancing

The Summer Stakes is a Group 3 flat horse race in Great Britain open to fillies and mares aged three years or older. It is run at York over a distance of 6 furlongs (1,207 metres), and it is scheduled to take place each year in July.

The event was established in 1996, and it was initially classed at Listed level. It was promoted to Group 3 status in 2003.

The Summer Stakes is held on the opening day of York's two-day John Smith's Cup meeting.

== Records ==
Most successful horse (3 wins):

- Ladies are Forever - 2011, 2013, 2014

Leading jockey (2 wins):

- Stephen Carson – Palace Affair (2001, 2002)
- Paul Hanagan - Rose Blossom (2010), Royal Intervention (2019)
- Silvestre De Sousa - Ladies are Forever (2011), Flotus (2022)

Leading trainer (3 wins):

- Geoff Oldroyd - Ladies are Forever (2011, 2013, 2014)

== Winners ==
Year	Winner	Age	Jockey	Trainer	Time
1996	Carranita	6	Tim Sprake	Bryn Palling	1:11.42
1997	Bint Albaadiya	3	John Reid	Michael Stoute	1:11.45
1998	Nanoushka	3	Pat Eddery	Richard Hannon Sr.	1:10.33
1999	Imperial Beauty	3	Gary Stevens	Peter Makin	1:10.75
2000	Hot Tin Roof	4	Kevin Darley	Tim Easterby	1:12.21
2001	Palace Affair	3	Stephen Carson	Toby Balding	1:12.04
2002	Palace Affair	4	Stephen Carson	Toby Balding	1:11.43
2003	Torosay Spring	5	Jamie Spencer	James Fanshawe	1:11.34
2004	Tante Rose	4	Michael Hills	Roger Charlton	1:13.26
2005	Lucky Spin	4	Ryan Moore	Richard Hannon Sr.	1:11.35
2006	La Chunga	3	Darryll Holland	Jeremy Noseda	1:10.14
2007	Theann	3	Seamie Heffernan	Aidan O'Brien	1:13.27
2008	Our Faye	5	Neil Callan	Sylvester Kirk	1:16.90
2009	Serious Attitude	3	Eddie Ahern	Rae Guest	1:09.82
2010	Rose Blossom	3	Paul Hanagan	Richard Fahey	1:09.75
2011	Ladies are Forever	3	Silvestre de Sousa	Geoff Oldroyd	1:09.18
2012	Gracia Directa	4	Robert Winston	Dominik Moser	1:14.10
2013	Ladies are Forever	5	Graham Lee	Geoff Oldroyd	1:10.53
2014	Ladies are Forever	6	Daniel Tudhope	Geoff Oldroyd	1:09.30
2015	New Providence	3	Harry Bentley	Hugo Palmer	1:10.20
2016	Ridge Ranger	5	Jason Hart	Eric Alston	1:10.01
2017	Mystic Dawn	3	Stevie Donohoe	David Simcock	1:10.84
2018	Raven's Lady	4	Gerald Mosse	Marco Botti	1:12.44
2019	Royal Intervention	3	Paul Hanagan	Ed Walker	1:10.42
2020	Queen Jo Jo	4	Sam James	Kevin Ryan	1:11.16
2021	Light Refrain	3	Tom Marquand	William Haggas	1:10.88
2022	Flotus	3	Silvestre De Sousa	Simon & Ed Crisford	1:10.24
2023	Swingalong	3	Clifford Lee	Karl Burke	1:09.86
2024	Flora Of Bermuda	3	P. J. McDonald	Andrew Balding	1:12.07
2025	Sayidah Dariyan	3	Billy Loughnane	Richard Hughes	1:09.42
2026	Flora Of Bermuda	5	James Doyle	Andrew Balding	1:09.51

== See also ==
- Horse racing in Great Britain
- List of British flat horse races
