= Stephen Carson (jockey) =

English jockey (born 1979)

Stephen Carson (born 4 June 1979 in Ballymoney, County Antrim) was a flat racing jockey who rode in England. Stephen started his career as apprentice to Michael Grassick on the Curragh in County Kildare, Ireland after graduating from RACE (the Race Apprentice Centre of Education).

Tartan Lane supplied Stephen with his first winner when taking the County Wexford Publicans Apprentice Maiden at Wexford on 26 July 1996.

Stephen joined Eric Wheeler's yard near Reading in England in the summer of 1997 and was successful on his first ride for the yard when scoring on Dark Menace at Brighton.

He quickly struck up a successful partnership with stable star Dancing Mystery and partnered the gelding to 21 successes.

Stephen was formerly stable jockey to Eve Johnson Houghton and partnered his biggest winner to date when riding Tout Seul to victory in the Group 1 Dewhurst Stakes for the trainer's father Fulke in October 2002.

== Major wins ==
(United Kingdom) Great Britain

- Dewhurst Stakes - (1) - Tout Seul (2001)
