= Wince =

British-bred Thoroughbred racehorse

- Sire: Selkirk
- Grandsire: Sharpen Up
- Dam: Flit
- Damsire: Lyphard
- Sex: Mare
- Foaled: 26 April 1996
- Country: United Kingdom
- Colour: Bay
- Breeder: Juddmonte Farms
- Owner: Khalid Abdulla
- Trainer: Henry Cecil
- Record: 9: 4-1-1
- Earnings: £168,220

Major wins
- Fred Darling Stakes (1999); 1000 Guineas (1999)

Honours
- Timeform rating: 117 in 1999.

Wince (28 April 1996 – 2016) was a British Thoroughbred racehorse and broodmare. In a racing career which lasted from June 1998 to May 1999 she ran nine times and won four races. After winning twice from six starts as a two-year-old, she won the Fred Darling Stakes at Newbury. On her next appearance Wince won the Classic 1000 Guineas at Newmarket Racecourse. On her only subsequent appearance she finished unplaced in the Irish 1,000 Guineas at the Curragh three weeks later. At the end of her three-year-old season she was retired from racing to become a successful broodmare.

== Background ==
Wince, a large, powerful bay mare with a white blaze and a white sock, on her left foreleg was bred in England by her owner Khalid Abdulla's Juddmonte Farms. Wince was sired by Selkirk an American-bred miler who won the Queen Elizabeth II Stakes in 1991. As a breeding stallion, Selkirk's progeny include fifteen Group One winners including Cityscape (Dubai Duty Free), Leadership (Gran Premio di Milano) and Kastoria (Irish St. Leger). Her dam, Flit, won one minor race and was a full sister to the American racemare Skimble (Dahlia Handicap).

Wince was trained by Henry Cecil at his Warren Place stables at Newmarket, Suffolk and was ridden in all of her races by Kieren Fallon.

== Racing career ==
=== 1998: two-year-old season ===
Wince began her career by finishing third in a five furlong maiden race at Leicester Racecourse on 1 June. A month later she was moved up to seven furlongs and recorded her first win in a maiden at Kempton Park. Wince was then moved up to Listed class and finished second to the favourite Fairy Queen in the Star Stakes at Sandown Park. The filly's second win came at Chester in August when she started at odds of 4/9 and won the six furlong Combermere Stakes by four lengths. Wince then returned to Listed class for the Oh So Sharp Stakes at Newmarket in October. She started 5/2 favourite but after Fallon struggled to obtain a clear run in the closing stages she finished fifth of the ten runners behind the 33/1 outsider Snittenby. Despite her defeat, Wince was made 9/4 favourite for the Group Two Rockfel Stakes two weeks later. After being in touch for the leaders for most of the way, she made no impression in the closing stages and finished seventh behind Hula Angel. Her performances had been promising, but did not suggest that she was a likely classic winner. Timeform expressed the opinion that Wince was unlikely to stay beyond seven furlongs.

=== 1999: three-year-old season ===
Wince thrived over the winter of 1998/9 but only became a contender for the 1000 Guineas after her stable's leading filly, Bionic, was ruled out of the race by injury. On her three-year-old debut, Wince was sent to Newbury to contest the seven furlong Fred Darling Stakes, a trial race for the Guineas. Fallon restrained the filly in the early stages before sending her into the lead a furlong from the finish to win by one and a half lengths from the Mill Reef Stakes winner, Golden Silca. Sixteen days after her Newbury win, Wince started 4/1 favourite in a field of twenty-two fillies for the 1000 Guineas. The filly had been the subject of heavy betting support after a trial gallop in which she had finished a close second to the stable's leading colt Enrique, who then finished runner-up in the 2000 Guineas. As the Rowley Mile course was being redeveloped, the race was run on the Newmarket July course for the first time since 1945. The runners split into two groups, with Fallon positioning Wince towards the rear of the group nearest the stands. In the last quarter mile, Wince moved forward under a strong drive from Fallon and took the lead of the stands-side group a furlong from the finish. Despite drifting left towards the centre of the course, she prevailed by half a length from Wannabe Grand, with Valentine Waltz, who had raced on the opposite side of the course, a short head away in third. The win gave Henry Cecil his sixth win in the race equaling the 20th century record set by his father-in-law Noel Murless.

On her next appearance, Wince started 5/4 favourite for the Irish 1000 Guineas at the Curragh. Fallon attempted to challenge the leaders in the final quarter mile, but Wince made no progress and finished fifth behind Hula Angel, who beat Golden Silca by a neck. After the race, Wince was examined by racecourse vets who found no serious injury, but Cecil reported that the filly "wasn't quite sound". Before she could run again, Wince later sustained a joint injury to one her hind legs which ended her racing career.

== Assessment ==
Timeform rated Wince at 94+ as a two-year-old and 117 at three.

In their book, A Century of Champions, based on the Timeform rating system, John Randall and Tony Morris rated Wince an "inferior" winner of the 1000 Guineas.

== Stud record ==
Wince became a broodmare for her owners Juddmonte Stud. She has produced several winners, the best of which was Quiff, a filly sired by Sadler's Wells, who won the Yorkshire Oaks and finished second in the St Leger in 2004. Wince died in 2016.

- 2001 Quiff (GB) : Bay filly, foaled 2 March, by Sadler's Wells (USA) – won G1 Yorkshire Oaks, York – 2nd G1 St Leger Stakes, Doncaster
- 2004 Arabian Gulf (GB) : Bay colt, foaled 8 February, by Sadler's Wells (USA) – winner and placed 2nd G3 Chester Vase – at stud in India
- 2006 Dream Win : Bay colt, foaled 21 January, by Oasis Dream (GB) – winner of 4 minor races in England 2010–2012
- 2010 Dream Wild : Bay filly, foaled 6 May, by Oasis Dream (GB) – minor winner in England during 2013

== Pedigree ==
Pedigree of Wince (GB), bay mare, 1996
Sire Selkirk (USA) 1988	Sharpen Up; 1969	Atan	Native Dancer
Sire Selkirk (USA) 1988	Sharpen Up; 1969	Atan	Mixed Marriage
Sire Selkirk (USA) 1988	Sharpen Up; 1969	Rocchetta	Rockfella
Sire Selkirk (USA) 1988	Sharpen Up; 1969	Rocchetta	Chambiges
Sire Selkirk (USA) 1988	Annie Edge; 1980	Nebbiolo	Yellow God
Sire Selkirk (USA) 1988	Annie Edge; 1980	Nebbiolo	Novara
Sire Selkirk (USA) 1988	Annie Edge; 1980	Friendly Court	Be Friendly
Sire Selkirk (USA) 1988	Annie Edge; 1980	Friendly Court	No Court
Dam Flit (USA) 1988	Lyphard; 1969	Northern Dancer	Nearctic
Dam Flit (USA) 1988	Lyphard; 1969	Northern Dancer	Natalma
Dam Flit (USA) 1988	Lyphard; 1969	Goofed	Court Martial (horse)
Dam Flit (USA) 1988	Lyphard; 1969	Goofed	Barra
Dam Flit (USA) 1988	Nimble Folly; 1977	Cyane	Turn-To
Dam Flit (USA) 1988	Nimble Folly; 1977	Cyane	Your Game
Dam Flit (USA) 1988	Nimble Folly; 1977	Instant Sin	Restless Native
Dam Flit (USA) 1988	Nimble Folly; 1977	Instant Sin	Enchanted Eve (Family: 4-r)
