= Flying Fillies' Stakes =

Flat horse race in Britain

- Class: Listed
- Location: Pontefract Racecourse; Pontefract, England
- Race type: Flat / Thoroughbred
- Sponsor: Highfield Farm
- Website: Pontefract

Race information
- Distance: 6f (1,207 metres)
- Surface: Turf
- Track: Left-handed
- Qualification: Three-years-old and up fillies & mares
- Weight: 9 st 1 lb (3yo); 9 st 4 lb (4yo+); Penalties; 3 lb for Group 3 winners* 5 lb for Group 2 winners* 7 lb for Group 1 winners* * after 2024
- Purse: £50,000 (2025); 1st: £28,010

Flying Fillies' Stakes
2026
America Queen	Ruby's Angel	Arabian Dusk

Previous years
2025
Rosy Affair	Magic Basma	Hold A Dream
2024
Marine Wave	Adaay In Devon	Tiger Bay
2023
Believing	Funny Story	Samedi Rien
2022
Princess Shabnam	Gale Force Maya	Chil Chil
2021
Double Or Bubble	Shepherds Way	Glesga Gal

2020-2011
2020
Stormy Girl	Jouska	Magical Journey
2019
Perfection	Shades Of Blue	Miss Celestial
2018
Castle Hill Cassie	Foxtrot Lady	Miss Bar Beach
2017
Queen Kindly	Eartha Kitt	Raven's Lady
2016
Mehronissa	Ridge Ranger	La Rioja
2015
Divine	Online Alexander	Interception
2014
Valonia	Spinatrix	Mu'ajiza
2013
Artistic Jewel	Minalisa	Enrol
2012
Mince	Ultrasonic	Artistic Jewel
2011
Rose Blossom	Darajaat	Desert Poppy

2010-2001
2010
Bounty Box	Dever Dream	Flambeau
2009
Mullein	Bouvardia	Pretty Bonnie
2007
Ripples Maid	Diamond Diva	Bee Eater
2006
Indian Maiden	Home Sweet Home	Ripples Maid
2005
Fruit of Glory	Indian Maiden	Goldeva
2004
Goldeva	Fruit of Glory	Simianna
2003
Lochridge	Lady Lindsay	Vita Spericolata
2002
Cotton House	Vita Spericolata	Marika
2001
Monnavanna	Perfect Peach	Rich Gift

2000-1998
2000
Arabesque	Jezebel	Jemima
1999
Wannabe Grand	Pipalong	Hot Tin Roof
1998
Zelanda	Bayleaf	Nanoushka

The Flying Fillies' Stakes is a Listed flat horse race in Great Britain open to fillies and mares aged three years or older. It is run at Pontefract over a distance of 6 furlongs (1,027 metres).

The race was first run in 1998, and it is scheduled to take place each year in August.

== Records ==
Most successful horse:

- no horse has won this race more than once

Leading jockey (2 wins):

- Tony Culhane - Cotton House (2002), Goldeva (2004)
- Graham Lee - Artistic Jewel (2013), Castle Hill Cassie (2018)
- Silvestre de Sousa - Divine (2015), Perfection (2019)
- Daniel Tudhope - Believing (2023), America Queen (2026)

Leading trainer (3 wins):

- Richard Fahey – Rose Blossom (2011), Queen Kindly (2017), Marine Wave (2024)

== Winners ==
Year	Winner	Age	Jockey	Trainer	Time
1998	Zelanda	3	Tony Garth	John Gosden	1:15.00
1999	Wannabe Grand	3	Pat Eddery	Jeremy Noseda	1:15.00
2000	Arabesque	3	Richard Quinn	Henry Cecil	1:13.90
2001	Monnavanna	3	Darryll Holland	Geoff Wragg	1:18.03
2002	Cotton House	5	Tony Culhane	Mick Channon	1:16.20
2003	Lochridge	4	Martin Dwyer	Andrew Balding	1:14.77
2004	Goldeva	5	Tony Culhane	Reg Hollinshead	1:17.20
2005	Fruit of Glory	6	Micky Fenton	John Jenkins	1:15.42
2006	Indian Maiden	6	Ted Durcan	Malcolm Saunders	1:17.13
2007	Ripples Maid	4	Royston Ffrench	Jonathan Geake	1:16.00
2008	Abandoned due to waterlogging
2009	Mullein	4	Seb Sanders	Ralph Beckett	1:14.44
2010	Bounty Box	4	George Baker	Chris Wall	1:14.92
2011	Rose Blossom	4	Paul Hanagan	Richard Fahey	1:14.78
2012	Mince	3	Frankie Dettori	Roger Charlton	1:14.20
2013	Artistic Jewel	4	Graham Lee	Ed McMahon	1:15.66
2014	Valonia	3	Harry Bentley	Henry Candy	1:14.39
2015	Divine	4	Silvestre de Sousa	Mick Channon	1:16.89
2016	Mehronissa	4	Frederik Tylicki	Ed Vaughan	1:14.04
2017	Queen Kindly	3	Tom Eaves	Richard Fahey	1:15.31
2018	Castle Hill Cassie	4	Graham Lee	Ben Haslam	1:15.59
2019	Perfection	4	Silvestre de Sousa	David O'Meara	1:15.55
2020	Stormy Girl	3	Cam Hardie	Rebecca Menzies	1:13.87
2021	Double or Bubble	4	Jack Mitchell	Chris Wall	1:15.37
2022	Princess Shabnam	3	Nicola Currie	Sean Woods	1:15.62
2023	Believing	3	Daniel Tudhope	George Boughey	1:14.47
2024	Marine Wave	4	Oisin Orr	Richard Fahey	1:14.95
2025	Rosy Affair	4	Billy Loughnane	George Boughey	1:15.92
2026	America Queen	3	Danny Tudhope	Richard Hughes	1:14.11

== See also ==
- Horse racing in Great Britain
- List of British flat horse races
