= Rockfel Stakes =

Flat horse race in Britain

- Class: Group 2
- Location: Rowley Mile; Newmarket, England
- Inaugurated: 1981
- Race type: Flat / Thoroughbred
- Sponsor: BoyleSports
- Website: Newmarket

Race information
- Distance: 7f (1,408 metres)
- Surface: Turf
- Track: Straight
- Qualification: Two-year-old fillies
- Weight: 9 st 2 lb Penalties; 3 lb for G1 / G2 Group 2 winners
- Purse: £100,000 (2025); 1st: £56,710

Rockfel Stakes
2026
Pensando A Te	Light Of Dawn	Ruby Moon

Previous years
2025
Zanthos	The Prettiest Star	Moon Target
2024
Bubbling	Serving With Style	Duty First
2023
Carla's Way	Shuwari	Ylang Ylang
2022
Commissioning	Electric Eyes	Rage Of Bamby
2021
Hello You	Cachet	Oscula

2020-2011
2020
Isabella Giles	Nazuna	Alba Rose
2019
Daahyeh	Stylistique	Cloak Of Spirits
2018
Just Wonderful	Dandhu	Main Edition
2017
Juliet Capulet	Nyaleti	Gavota
2016
Spain Burg	Fair Eva	Miss Infinity
2015
Promising Run	Thetis	Hawksmoor
2014
Lucida	Fadhayyil	New Providence
2013
Al Thakhira	Blockade	Valonia
2012
Just The Judge	Nargys	Desert Blossom
2011
Wading	Pimpernel	Gray Pearl

2010-2001
2010
Cape Dollar	Cochabamba	I Love Me
2009
Music Show	Atasari	Tabassum
2008
Lahaleeb	Aspen Darlin	Souter's Sister
2007
Kitty Matcham	Missit	Royal Confidence
2006
Finsceal Beo	Rahiyah	Puggy
2005
Speciosa	Violette	Abigail Pett
2004
Maids Causeway	Penkenna Princess	Favourita
2003
Cairns	Snow Goose	Kelucia
2002
Luvah Girl	Casual Look	Yesterday
2001
Distant Valley	Lahinch	Misterah

2000-1991
2000
Sayedah	Imagine	Katherine Seymour
1999
Lahan	Clog Dance	Total Love
1998
Hula Angel	Valentine Waltz	Hasty Words
1997
Name Of Love	Tadwiga	Statua
1996
Moonlight Paradise	Dazzle	Serenity
1995
Bint Salsabil	Parrot Jungle	My Branch
1994
Germane	Subya	Fleet Hill
1993
Relatively Special	Ballard Ring	Reason To Dance
1992
Yawl	Queen's View	Mystic Goddess
1991
Musicale	Mystery Play	Snow Forest

1990-1988
1990
Crystal Gazing	Lee Artiste	Crystal Path
1989
Negligent	Fearless Revival	Va Toujours
1988
Musical Bliss	Jaljuli	Orange Grove

The Rockfel Stakes is a Group 2 flat horse race in Great Britain open to two-year-old fillies. It is run on the Rowley Mile at Newmarket over a distance of 7 furlongs (1,408 metres), and it is scheduled to take place each year in September.

== History ==
The event is named after Rockfel, a successful filly whose victories included two Classics in 1938. It was established in 1981, and its first winner was Top Hope.

The Rockfel Stakes attained Listed status in 1985, and it was promoted to Group 3 level in 1986. It was upgraded to Group 2 in 1998.

The race was formerly staged during Newmarket's Champions' Day meeting in mid-October. It became part of a new fixture called Future Champions Day in 2011 and was moved to a September date from 2014, switching places in the calendar with the Fillies' Mile. The race is currently part of the Breeders' Cup Challenge and the winner earns an automatic place in the Breeders' Cup Juvenile Fillies Turf race.

The leading horses from the Rockfel Stakes sometimes go on to compete in the following season's 1000 Guineas. Four fillies have won both events, the most recent being Finsceal Beo (2006–07).

== Records ==
Leading jockey (4 wins):

- Michael Hills – Negligent (1989), Hula Angel (1998), Maids Causeway (2004), Just The Judge (2012)
- Frankie Dettori - Crystal Gazing (1990), Moonlight Paradise (1996), Spain Burg (2016), Juliet Capulet (2017)
- Ryan Moore - Cape Dollar (2010), Wading (2011), Just Wonderful (2018), Bubbling (2024)

Leading trainer (4 wins):

- Barry Hills – Negligent (1989), Yawl (1992), Hula Angel (1998), Maids Causeway (2004)
- Aidan O'Brien - Kitty Matcham (2007), Wading (2011), Just Wonderful (2018), Bubbling (2024)

== Winners ==
Year	Winner	Jockey	Trainer	Time
1981	Top Hope	Walter Swinburn	Michael Stoute	1:28.56
1982	Saving Mercy	Brian Taylor	Jeremy Hindley	1:29.45
1983	Mahogany	Joe Mercer	Charlie Nelson	1:26.89
1984	Kashi Lagoon	Bruce Raymond	Ben Hanbury	1:28.71
1985	Tralthee	Lester Piggott	Luca Cumani	1:27.30
1986	At Risk	Steve Cauthen	Henry Cecil	1:29.47
1987	Abandoned due to high winds and structural damage
1988	Musical Bliss	Walter Swinburn	Michael Stoute	1:28.64
1989	Negligent	Michael Hills	Barry Hills	1:24.42
1990	Crystal Gazing	Frankie Dettori	Luca Cumani	1:29.80
1991	Musicale	Pat Eddery	Henry Cecil	1:23.92
1992	Yawl	Darryll Holland	Barry Hills	1:23.81
1993	Relatively Special	Ray Cochrane	Luca Cumani	1:27.82
1994	Germane	Micky Fenton	Michael Bell	1:25.76
1995	Bint Salsabil	Willie Carson	John Dunlop	1:26.05
1996	Moonlight Paradise	Frankie Dettori	Saeed bin Suroor	1:26.26
1997	Name of Love	Kieren Fallon	David Loder	1:26.42
1998	Hula Angel	Michael Hills	Barry Hills	1:25.84
1999 (Note: The 1999 race was run on the July Course at Newmarket)	Lahan	Richard Hills	John Gosden	1:26.79
2000	Sayedah	Richard Hills	Marcus Tregoning	1:27.96
2001	Distant Valley	Dane O'Neill	Richard Hannon Sr.	1:28.53
2002	Luvah Girl	Kevin Darley	Roger Charlton	1:24.98
2003	Cairns	Ted Durcan	Mick Channon	1:25.88
2004	Maids Causeway	Michael Hills	Barry Hills	1:28.93
2005	Speciosa	Micky Fenton	Pam Sly	1:27.01
2006	Finsceal Beo	Kevin Manning	Jim Bolger	1:27.12
2007	Kitty Matcham	Johnny Murtagh	Aidan O'Brien	1:27.01
2008	Lahaleeb	Darryll Holland	Mick Channon	1:23.95
2009	Music Show	Kieren Fallon	Mick Channon	1:23.83
2010	Cape Dollar	Ryan Moore	Sir Michael Stoute	1:26.91
2011	Wading	Ryan Moore	Aidan O'Brien	1:23.75
2012	Just The Judge	Michael Hills	Charles Hills	1:25.15
2013	Al Thakhira	Martin Harley	Marco Botti	1:25.54
2014	Lucida	Kevin Manning	Jim Bolger	1:22.82
2015	Promising Run	James Doyle	Saeed bin Suroor	1:23.55
2016	Spain Burg	Frankie Dettori	Xavier Thomas-Demeaulte	1:24.92
2017	Juliet Capulet	Frankie Dettori	John Gosden	1:27.23
2018	Just Wonderful	Ryan Moore	Aidan O'Brien	1:25.30
2019	Daahyeh	William Buick	Roger Varian	1:24.14
2020	Isabella Giles	Adam Kirby	Clive Cox	1:22.55
2021	Hello You	Rossa Ryan	David Loughnanne	1:23.12
2022	Commissioning	Robert Havlin	John and Thady Gosden	1:24.40
2023	Carla's Way	James Doyle	Simon & Ed Crisford	1:23.01
2024	Bubbling	Ryan Moore	Aidan O'Brien	1:27.20
2025	Zanthos	Oisin Murphy	Simon & Ed Crisford	1:24.19
2026	Pensando A Te	Silvestre De Sousa	Marco Botti	1:23.67

== See also ==
- Horse racing in Great Britain
- List of British flat horse races
