= Wannabe Grand =

Irish-bred Thoroughbred racehorse

- Sire: Danehill
- Grandsire: Danzig
- Dam: Wannabe
- Damsire: Shirley Heights
- Sex: Mare
- Foaled: 18 January 1996
- Country: Ireland
- Colour: Bay
- Breeder: Vizcaya Ag.
- Owner: Bruce McAllister
- Trainer: Jeremy Noseda
- Record: 16: 4-4-1
- Earnings: £274,391

Major wins
- Empress Stakes (1998); Cherry Hinton Stakes (1998); Cheveley Park Stakes (1998); Flying Fillies' Stakes (1999)

Wannabe Grand (18 January 1996 – after 2009) was an Irish-bred, British-trained Thoroughbred racehorse and broodmare. In a racing career which lasted from May 1998 until November 1999, she won four races and was placed five times from sixteen starts. She was one of the best juvenile fillies in Britain in 1998 when she won the Empress Stakes, Cherry Hinton Stakes and Cheveley Park Stakes as well as finishing second in the Lowther Stakes. In the following year she finished second in the 1000 Guineas on her seasonal debut and went on to win the Flying Fillies' Stakes, as well as being placed in the Coronation Stakes, Oak Tree Stakes and Queen Elizabeth II Challenge Cup Stakes. She was retired from racing to become a broodmare and produced at least seven winners.

== Background ==
Wannabe Grand was a bay mare with a large white star and a white sock on her left hind leg bred in Ireland by the horse breeding company Vizcaya Ag. She was sired by Danehill, a sprinter who won the Cork and Orrery Stakes and Haydock Sprint Cup in 1989. He went on to become a highly successful breeding stallion, producing the winners of more than one thousand races including 156 at Group One/Grade I level. Among his best offspring are Dylan Thomas, Duke of Marmalade, Rock of Gibraltar George Washington and North Light. Wannabe Grand's dam Wannabe won one minor race from six starts as a three-year-old in 1993 and also produced the Ballycorus Stakes winner Wannabe Better. Wannabe was a descendant of the broodmare Woodlark who was a half-sister to Alycidon and the grand-dam of Larkspur.

As a yearling in October 1997, Wannabe Grand was consigned by the Chippenham Lodge Stud Tattersalls and bought for 60,000 guineas by David Morris. During her racing career, the filly was owned by Bruce McAllister and trained by Jeremy Noseda at Newmarket, Suffolk.

== Racing career ==
=== 1998: two-year-old season ===
On her racecourse debut, Wannabe Grand finished fourth in a six furlong maiden race at Leicester Racecourse on 25 May and then finished second in a similar event at Newmarket eleven days later. On 25 June the filly was moved up in class for the Listed Empress Stakes at over six furlongs at Newmarket and started the 7/4 favourite against five opponents. Ridden by John Reid she took the lead two furlongs from the finish and won by three quarters of a length and half a length from Aunt Flo and Miss Universe. Walter Swinburn took over the ride when the filly was stepped up in class again for the Group Three Cherry Hinton Stakes over the same course and distance on 7 July. The David Loder-trained Spirit Willing started favourite ahead of the Queen Mary Stakes runner-up Pipalong and the French challenger Pescara, with Wannabe Grand starting at odds of 11/1 in the ten-runner field. After being restrained by Swinburn in the early stages she took the lead inside the final furlong and won by one and a half lengths from Pipalong with Pescara a short head away in third.

Wannabe Grand was beaten in her next three races. On 25 July she finished fourth behind Mythical Girl, Gipsy Rose Lee and Rustic in the Princess Margaret Stakes at Ascot Racecourse. In the Lowther Stakes at York on 20 August she finished second of the ten runners behind Bint Allayl with Flanders in third and Mythical Girl in sixth. In September she was sent to Ireland for the Group One Moyglare Stud Stakes over seven furlongs at the Curragh and ran fourth behind Edabiya, Fear and Greed and Crystal Downs. Noseda felt that the soft ground and strong headwind had led to the filly's stamina being overtaxed.

On her final appearance of the season, Wannabe Grand, ridden by the veteran Pat Eddery was one of nine fillies to contest the Group One Cheveley Park Stakes at Newmarket on 29 September. Noseda had not intended to run the filly but changed his mind when Bint Allayl was injured; he commented "I honestly thought that we would never beat Bint Allayl so, if we went to Newmarket, we would be running for a place. But that has changed now and we might be able to win". She was made the 3/1 favourite ahead of the Godolphin filly Subeen whilst the other runners included Flanders, Miss Universe, Circle of Gold (winner of the Prestige Stakes), Golden Silca (Mill Reef Stakes), Imperial Beauty and Atlantic Destiny (Sirenia Stakes). After being restrained in the early stages, she began to make progress in the last quarter mile, took the lead 150 yards from the finish and won by half a length from Imperial Beauty. Subeen took third just ahead of Miss Universe, Atlantic Destiny and Circle of Gold.

=== 1999: three-year-old season ===
On her three-year-old debut, Wannabe Grand started a 16/1 outsider for the 1000 Guineas at Newmarket on 2 May. She raced up the stands side of the Rowley Mile course (the left-hand side from the jockeys' viewpoint), and after being held up by Eddery in the early stages she finished well to place second to Wince, beaten half a length by the winner, with Valentine Waltz a short head away in third. In the Coronation Stakes at Royal Ascot in June she started the 11/4 favourite but dead-heated for third with Valentine Waltz behind Balisada and Golden Silca. The filly was brought back to sprint distances in July and started favourite for the July Cup in which she was matched against colts and older horses. She finished seventh of the seventeen runners behind Stravinsky. Later that month she was made favourite for the Listed Oak Tree Stakes at Goodwood Racecourse, but after taking the lead inside the final furlong she was caught in the final stride and beaten a head by the Henry Cecil-trained Selfish. On 22 August, Wannabe Grand started the 10/11 favourite for the Listed Flying Fillies Stakes over six furlongs at Pontefract Racecourse. After tracking the early leader Noble One, she moved up to dispute the lead a furlong out and won by half a length from Pipalong.

On her final appearance in Europe, Wannabe Grand contested the Haydock Sprint Cup on 4 September and finished seventh of the sixteen runners behind the four-year-old colt Diktat. For her last two races, the filly was sent to race in North America and was moved up in distance. In the Queen Elizabeth II Challenge Cup Stakes over nine furlongs at Keeneland Racecourse on 9 October she was ridden by Robby Albarado and stayed on well in the closing stages to finish third behind Perfect Sting. Eddie Delahoussaye took over the ride in the Matriarch Stakes at Hollywood Park Racetrack on 22 November, when the filly finished fifth of the nine runners behind Happyandunoit.

== Breeding record ==
Wannabe Grand was retired from racing to become a broodmare. In December 2009 she was auctioned at Tattersalls and bought for 62,000 guineas by Badgers Bloodstock. Relocated to Double S Bloodstock in New South Wales, Australia in 2009, Wannabe Grand has produced 13 foals and seven winners to date:

- Bachelor of Arts, a bay colt, foaled in 2001, sired by Stravinsky. Won one race.
- Walkonthewildside, bay colt (later gelded), 2002, by Giant's Causeway. Won three races.
- King of Argos, bay colt (later gelded), 2003, by Sadler's Wells. Won four races.
- Zetto Kirk, bay colt, 2004, by Selkirk. Won seven races in Japan.
- Wannabe Free, bay filly, 2005, by Red Ransom. Won one race.
- Wannabe King, bay colt (later gelded), 2006, by King's Best. Won eight races.
- Mashatu, bay colt (later gelded), 2007, by Pivotal. Failed to win in eight races.
- Breton Star, bay colt (later gelded), 2008, by Medicean. Failed to win in seven races.
- Estrela, bay filly, 2009, by Authorized. Won one race.
- Wannabe A Mak, brown gelding, 2011, by More Than Ready. Placed once in 9 starts.
- Lukey Dee, bay colt, 2013, by New Approach. Unraced.
- Unnamed filly by Sebring, 2014.
- Unnamed filly by Pierro, 2015.

== Pedigree ==
Pedigree of Wannabe Grand (IRE), bay mare, 1996
Sire Danehill (USA) 1986	Danzig (USA); 1977	Northern Dancer	Nearctic
Sire Danehill (USA) 1986	Danzig (USA); 1977	Northern Dancer	Natalma*
Sire Danehill (USA) 1986	Danzig (USA); 1977	Pas de Nom	Admiral's Voyage
Sire Danehill (USA) 1986	Danzig (USA); 1977	Pas de Nom	Petitioner
Sire Danehill (USA) 1986	Razyana (USA); 1981	His Majesty	Ribot
Sire Danehill (USA) 1986	Razyana (USA); 1981	His Majesty	Flower Bowl
Sire Danehill (USA) 1986	Razyana (USA); 1981	Spring Adieu	Buckpasser
Sire Danehill (USA) 1986	Razyana (USA); 1981	Spring Adieu	Natalma*
Dam Wannabe (GB) 1990	Shirley Heights (GB); 1975	Mill Reef	Never Bend
Dam Wannabe (GB) 1990	Shirley Heights (GB); 1975	Mill Reef	Milan Mill
Dam Wannabe (GB) 1990	Shirley Heights (GB); 1975	Hardiemma	Hardicanute
Dam Wannabe (GB) 1990	Shirley Heights (GB); 1975	Hardiemma	Grand Cross
Dam Wannabe (GB) 1990	Propensity (GB); 1984	Habitat	Sir Gaylord
Dam Wannabe (GB) 1990	Propensity (GB); 1984	Habitat	Little Hut
Dam Wannabe (GB) 1990	Propensity (GB); 1984	Kalamac	Kalamoun
Dam Wannabe (GB) 1990	Propensity (GB); 1984	Kalamac	Tarmac (Family: 1-w)

- Like all of Danehill's offspring Wannabe Grand is inbred 4x4 to the mare Natalma. This means that she occurs twice in the fourth generation of her pedigree.
