= Pontefract Racecourse =

Racecourse in West Yorkshire, England

Pontefract
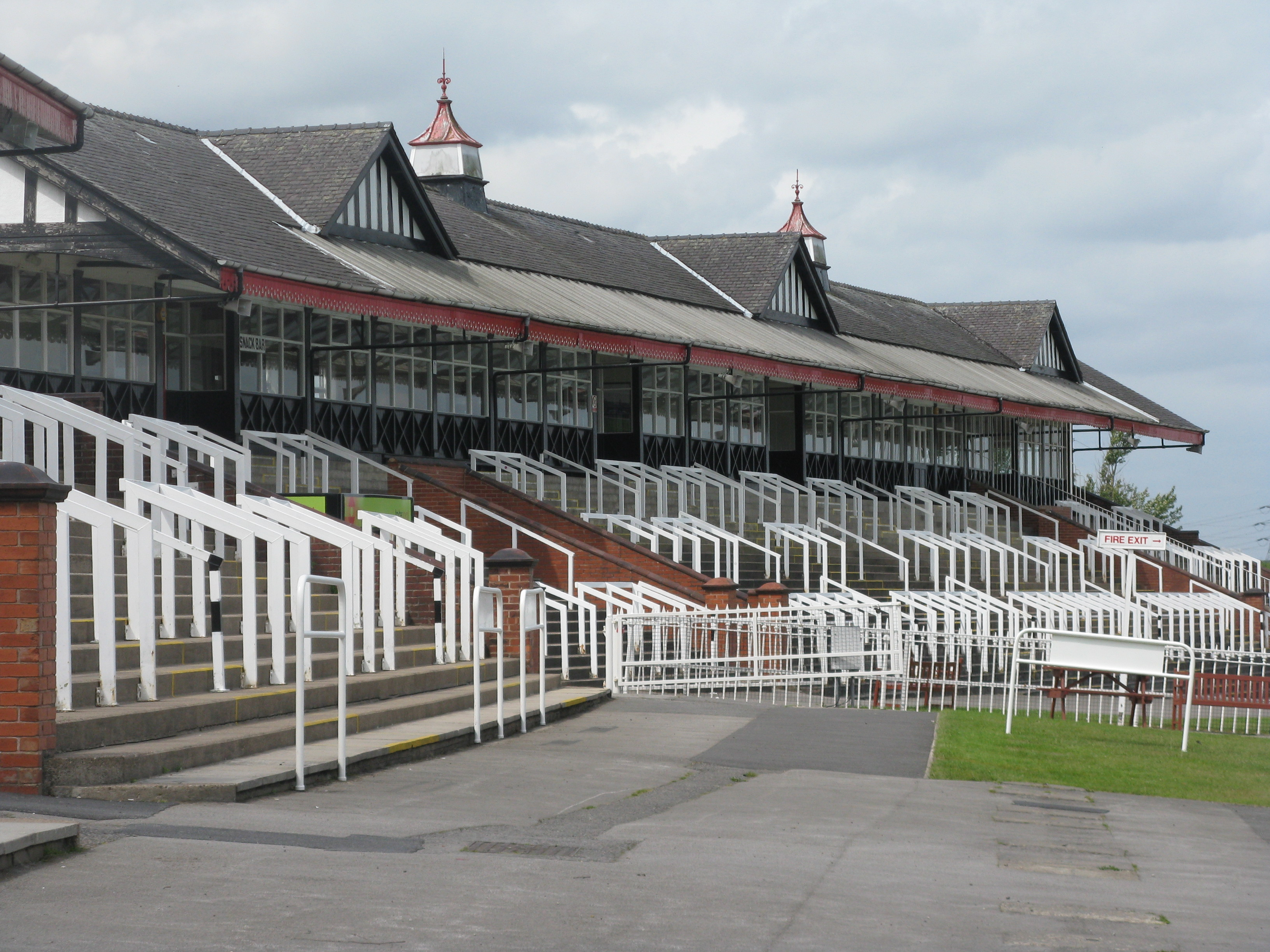
- The Grandstand
- Interactive map of Pontefract
- Location: Pontefract, West Yorkshire
- Coordinates: 53.7012°N 1.3325°W
- Owned by: Pontefract Park Race Company Ltd.
- Screened on: Racing TV
- Course type: Flat

Pontefract Racecourse is a thoroughbred horse racing venue located in Pontefract, West Yorkshire, England.

== Layout ==
The track is left-handed undulating course with a sharp bend into the home straight. Horses drawn low (i.e. on the inside of the track) usually have the advantage. The final 3 furlongs of the track are uphill, making it quite testing.

The course was originally a horseshoe of 1½ miles, but in 1983, it was converted into a full circuit of about 2m ½f. This made it the longest continuous flat racing circuit in Europe and allowed it to stage one of the longest races in the calendar, the Pontefract Marathon at 2m 5f 139y.

== History ==
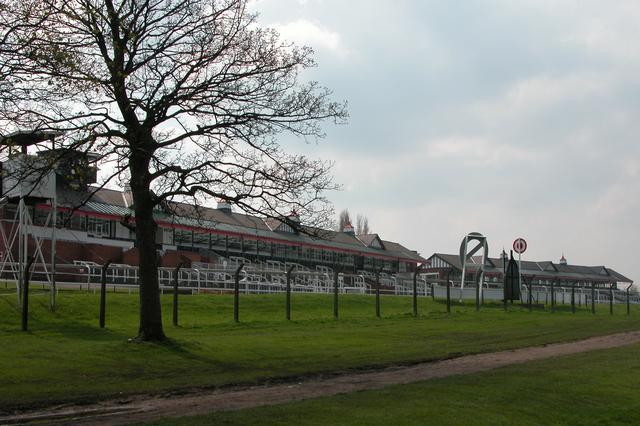
The racecourse grandstand

Racing is recorded as having taken place in Pontefract as early as 1648, just before the local Castle was taken by the forces of Oliver Cromwell. Races were held in the meadows near the town but these were discontinued by 1769. The townsfolk restarted the sport in 1801 and it has continued ever since. In 1827 the races were held in September and reported as being very fashionably attended.

While it cannot "claim to be one of Yorkshire's major courses" it was used for some major races during World War II when other courses were out of action. These included the war substitute Lincoln and November Handicaps.

Pontefract installed a photo finish in 1952 and was also the first English course to have a dope testing facility.

The course traditionally began its afternoon race meetings at 2.45 pm – later than most other courses – so that miners at the adjacent colliery could finish the morning shift in time to go racing. This remained the case until the colliery closed in 2002.

== Facts and figures ==
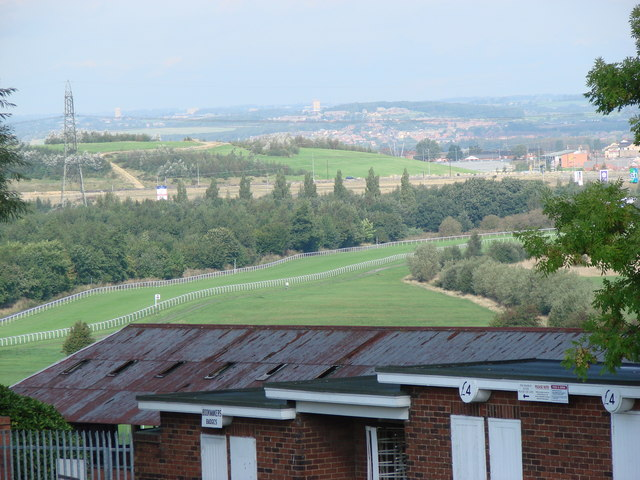
Pontefract Racecourse seen from Park Hill

=== Flat ===
- Number of fixtures (2012) – 15
- Prize money (2012) – £731,810
- Top trainer (2007 – 2011 inc.) – Richard Fahey, 28 wins from 213 races

== Notable races ==
Month	DOW	Race Name	Grade	Distance	Age/Sex
June	Sunday	Pontefract Castle Stakes	Listed	1m 4f 5y	4yo + f
July	Tuesday	Pipalong Stakes	Listed	1m 6y	4yo + f
July	Sunday	Pomfret Stakes	Listed	1m 6y	3yo +
August	Sunday	Flying Fillies' Stakes	Listed	6f	3yo + f
October	Monday	Silver Tankard Stakes	Listed	1m 6y	2yo

== Bibliography ==
- Fox, George (1827). The History of Pontefract in Yorkshire. Pontefract, England: John Fox. "pontefract racecourse."
- Mortimer, Roger; Onslow, Richard; Willett, Peter (1978). Biographical Encyclopaedia of British Racing. London: Macdonald and Jane's. ISBN 0-354-08536-0.
- Wright, Howard (1986). The Encyclopaedia of Flat Racing. London: Robert Hale. ISBN 0-7090-2639-0.
