= Garrowby Stakes =

Flat horse race in Britain

- Class: Listed
- Location: York Racecourse; York, England
- Inaugurated: 2012
- Race type: Flat / Thoroughbred
- Sponsor: Sky Bet
- Website: York

Race information
- Distance: 6f (1,207 metres)
- Surface: Turf
- Track: Straight
- Qualification: Three-years-old and up exc. G1 or G2 winners since 31 March
- Weight: 9 st 2 lb (3yo); 9 st 4 lb (4yo+); Allowances 5 lb for fillies Penalties; 3 lb for Listed winners* 5 lb for Group 3 winners* * after 31 March
- Purse: £70,000 (2025); 1st: £39,967

Garrowby Stakes
2026
Extremely Zain	Double Rush	Dickensian

Previous years
2025
Elmonjed	Crestofdistinction	Prince Of India
2024
Quinault	Purosangue	Korker
2023
Commanche Falls	Juan Les Pins	Emaraaty Ana
2022
Gale Force Maya	Primo Bacio	Ventura Diamond
2021
Great Ambassador	Tabdeed	Fivethousandtoone

2020-2012
2020
Starman	Dakota Gold	Watan
2019
Dakota Gold	Danzeno	Marnie James
2018
Limato	Stormbringer	Kimberella
2017
Tommy Taylor	Downforce	Mobsta
2016
Nameitwhatyoulike	Danzeno	Scrutineer
2015
Lucky Kristale	Fort Del Oro	Mubtaghaa
2014
Naadirr	Ladies Are Forever	Justineo
2013
Hallelujah	Ladies Are Forever	Mince
2012
Mince	Colour Of Love	Free Zone

The Garrowby Stakes is a Listed flat horse race in Great Britain open to horses aged three years or older. It is run at York over a distance of 6 furlongs (1,207 metres), and it is scheduled to take place each year in September.

The race was first run in 2012. Until 2007, the name Garrowby (a hamlet in the East Riding of Yorkshire) was given to a valuable 12 furlongs handicap run at the same meeting.

== Records ==
Most successful horse since 2012:

- no horse has won this race more than once

Leading jockey since 2012 (4 wins):

- Connor Beasley – Nameitwhatyoulike (2017), Dakota Gold (2019), Gale Force Maya (2022), Commanche Falls (2023)

Leading trainer since 2012 (3 wins):

- Michael Dods - Dakota Gold (2019), Gale Force Maya (2022), Commanche Falls (2023)

== Winners since 2012 ==
Year	Winner	Age	Jockey	Trainer	Time
2012	Mince	3	James Doyle	Roger Charlton	1:08.23
2013	Hallelujah	5	Hayley Turner	James Fanshawe	1:10.87
2014	Naadirr	3	Martin Harley	Marco Botti	1:11.51
2015	Lucky Kristale	4	Jamie Spencer	George Margarson	1:11.78
2016	Nameitwhatyoulike	7	Connor Beasley	Bryan Smart	1:13.33
2017	Tommy Taylor	3	Tom Eaves	Kevin Ryan	1:12.62
2018	Limato	6	Harry Bentley	Henry Candy	1:11.73
2019	Dakota Gold	5	Connor Beasley	Michael Dods	1:10.10
2020	Starman	3	Tom Marquand	Ed Walker	1:11.27
2021	Great Ambassador	4	Tom Marquand	Ed Walker	1:11.38
2022	Gale Force Maya	6	Connor Beasley	Michael Dods	1:10.62
2023	Commanche Falls	6	Connor Beasley	Michael Dods	1:11.35
2024	Quinault	4	Marco Ghiani	Stuart Williams	1:13.51
2025	Elmonjed	4	Cieren Fallon	William Haggas	1:10.59

== See also ==
- Horse racing in Great Britain
- List of British flat horse races
