= Rose Bowl Stakes =

Rose Bowl Stakes
2026
Arapaho Gold	Nabati	Agamemnon

Previous years
2025
Wise Approach	Rock On Thunder	Amorim
2024
Yah Mo Be There	Jungle Drums	Big Cyril
2023
Action Point	Shagraan	Asadna
2022
Chateau	Rogue Lightning	Legend Of Xanadu
2021
Caturra	Detail	Orazio

2020-2011
2020
Method	Mighty Gurkha	Imperial Yellow
2019
Shadn	Misty Grey	Al Aakif
2018
Natalie's Joy	Chuck Willis	Emaraaty Ana
2017
Madeline	Natural	Another Batt
2016
Mokarris	Nobly Born	Kodiline
2015
Tasleet	Madrinho	Plagiarism
2014
Limato	Cotai Glory	Adaay
2013
Miracle of Medinah	Mappa Mundi	Survived
2012
Master Of War	Boomshackerlacker	All On Red
2011
Saigon	Caspar Netscher	Factory Time

2010-2001
2010
Al Aasifh	Cape To Rio	Sir Reginald
2009
Duplicity	Hearts Of Fire	Deal
2008
Saxford	Saucy Brown	Dabbers Chief
2006
Dazed And Amazed	Vauquelin	Prince of Elegance
2005
Assertive	Zato	Mixed Blessing
2004
Don Pele	Black Velvet	Indiannie Star
2003
Venables	America America	Flip Flop And Fly
2002
Deportivo	Checkit	Silca Boo
2001
Kulachi	Approval	Parisian Elegance

2000-1991
2000
Ascension	Stregone	Bravado
1999
Master Fay	Watching	Vita Spericolata
1998
Golden Silca	El Tango	Halloa
1997
Victory Note	Mugello	Bold Edge
1996
Crystal Crossing	Omaha City	Victory Dancer
1995
Polaris Flight	Kahir Almaydan	Kriscliffe
1994
Flowerdrum	Wavian	Knight Commander
1993
State Performer	Bagshot	Only two ran
1992
Silver Wizard	Port Lucaya	High Tycoon
1991
Rodrigo De Triano	River Falls	Rokeby

1990-1988
1990
Ivory Bride	Kafiyah	City Solace
1989
Rushmore	Dayjur	Osario
1988
Stellaria	Luge	Heart Of Arabia

The Rose Bowl Stakes is a Listed flat horse race in Great Britain open to horses aged two years only. It is run at Newbury over a distance of 6 furlongs (1,207 metres), and it is scheduled to take place each year in July.

== Records ==
Leading jockey (6 wins):

- John Reid – State Performer (1993), Flowerdrum (1994), Polaris Flight (1995), Crystal Crossing (1996), Victory Note (1997), Golden Silca (1998)

Leading trainer (6 wins):

- Peter Chapple-Hyam – Rodrigo de Triano (1991), State Performer (1993), Flowerdrum (1994), Polaris Flight (1995), Crystal Crossing (1996), Victory Note (1997)

== Winners ==
Year	Winner	Jockey	Trainer	Time
1963	Casserola	Scobie Breasley	Sir Gordon Richards	1:14.20
1964	Merry Madcap	Lester Piggott	Freddie Maxwell	1:15.80
1965	Last Case	Scobie Breasley	Peter Nelson	1:21.80
1966	Smooth	Lester Piggott	Fulke Johnson Houghton	1:13.80
1967	Fairy Path	Eric Eldin	John Waugh	1:15.00
1968	Star Story	David Yates	Fulke Johnson Houghton	1:16.20
1969	Ile De France	Ron Hutchinson	John Dunlop	1:16.60
1970	Madame's Share	Joe Mercer	Dick Hern	1:16.30
1971	Angel Beam	Duncan Keith	Peter Walwyn	1:13.78
1972	Negresse	Richard Marshall	Bill Marshall	1:17.07
1973	Red Berry	Pat Eddery	Peter Walwyn	1:17.41
1974	West Two	Geoff Lewis	Noel Murless	1:15.30
1975	Dame Foolish	Alan Bond	Henry Cecil	1:17.18
1976	Blackadder	Pat Eddery	Peter Walwyn	1:17.41
1977	Elegante	Eric Eldin	Gavin Pritchard-Gordon	1:13.79
1978	Hughes Next	Geoff Baxter	C Hill	1:14.96
1979	Schweppes Forever	Brian Rouse	Ryan Price	1:15.60
1980	Stats Emmar	Brian Taylor	Ryan Price	1:17.77
1981	Bless The Match	Brian Taylor	Gavin Pritchard-Gordon	1:15.50
1982	Henry's Secret	Walter Swinburn	Michael Stoute	1:15.37
1983	Rocket Alert	Tony Ives	Bill O'Gorman	1:14.49
1984	Hilly	Steve Cauthen	Charlie Nelson	1:13.25
1985	Northern Eternity	Pat Eddery	Ian Balding	1:16.79
1986	Sea Dara	Pat Eddery	Ian Balding	1:14.28
1987	Angelina Ballerina	Greville Starkey	Michael Stoute	1:15.73
1988	Stellaria	Willie Carson	Jeremy Tree	1:16.62
1989	Rushmore	Michael Roberts	Clive Brittain	1:13.09
1990	Ivory Bride	Ray Cochrane	Mark Tompkins	1:13.55
1991	Rodrigo de Triano	Paul Eddery	Peter Chapple-Hyam	1:13.73
1992	Silver Wizard	Paul Eddery	Geoff Lewis	1:16.25
1993	State Performer	John Reid	Peter Chapple-Hyam	1:18.32
1994	Flowerdrum	John Reid	Peter Chapple-Hyam	1:13.44
1995	Polaris Flight	John Reid	Peter Chapple-Hyam	1:15.86
1996	Crystal Crossing	John Reid	Peter Chapple-Hyam	1:11.49
1997	Victory Note	John Reid	Peter Chapple-Hyam	1:11.91
1998	Golden Silca	John Reid	Mick Channon	1:15.23
1999	Master Fay	Richard Quinn	Mick Channon	1:12.24
2000	Ascension	Craig Williams	Mick Channon	1:11.43
2001	Kulachi	Craig Williams	Mick Channon	1:13.68
2002	Deportivo	Richard Hughes	Roger Charlton	1:12.32
2003	Venables	Richard Hughes	Richard Hannon Sr.	1:13.50
2004	Don Pele	Jimmy Fortune	Sylvester Kirk	1:13.15
2005	Assertive	Richard Hughes	Richard Hannon Sr.	1:13.39
2006	Dazed And Amazed	Richard Hughes	Richard Hannon Sr.	1:12.95
2007	Abandoned due to waterlogging
2008	Saxford	Shane Kelly	Linda Stubbs	1:13.83
2009	Duplicity	Richard Hughes	Richard Hannon Sr.	1:17.49
2010	Al Aasifh	Frankie Dettori	Saeed bin Suroor	1:15.74
2011	Saigon	Kirsty Milczarek	James Toller	1:13.74
2012	Master Of War	Pat Dobbs	Richard Hannon Sr.	1:20.41
2013	Miracle of Medinah	Liam Keniry	Mark Usher	1:11.61
2014	Limato	James Doyle	Henry Candy	1:11.21
2015	Tasleet	Paul Hanagan	William Haggas	1:14.91
2016	Mokarris	Paul Hanagan	Simon Crisford	1:12.20
2017	Madeline	Silvestre de Sousa	Roger Varian	1:12.36
2018	Natalie's Joy	Frankie Dettori	Mark Johnston	1:11.19
2019	Shadn	Oisin Murphy	Andrew Balding	1:15.55
2020	Method	Oisin Murphy	Martyn Meade	1:11.36
2021	Caturra	Adam Kirby	Clive Cox	1:11.44
2022	Chateau	William Buick	Andrew Balding	1:13.38
2023	Action Point	Hollie Doyle	Archie Watson	1:12.43
2024	Yah Mo Be There	Jamie Spencer	Richard Spencer	1:11.73
2025	Wise Approach	William Buick	Charlie Appleby	1:11.93
2026	Arapaho Gold	Connor Beasley	Michael Dods	1:11.02

== See also ==
- Horse racing in Great Britain
- List of British flat horse races
