= Redcar Racecourse =

Racecourse in North Yorkshire, England

Coordinates: 54°36′27″N 1°03′54″W

Redcar
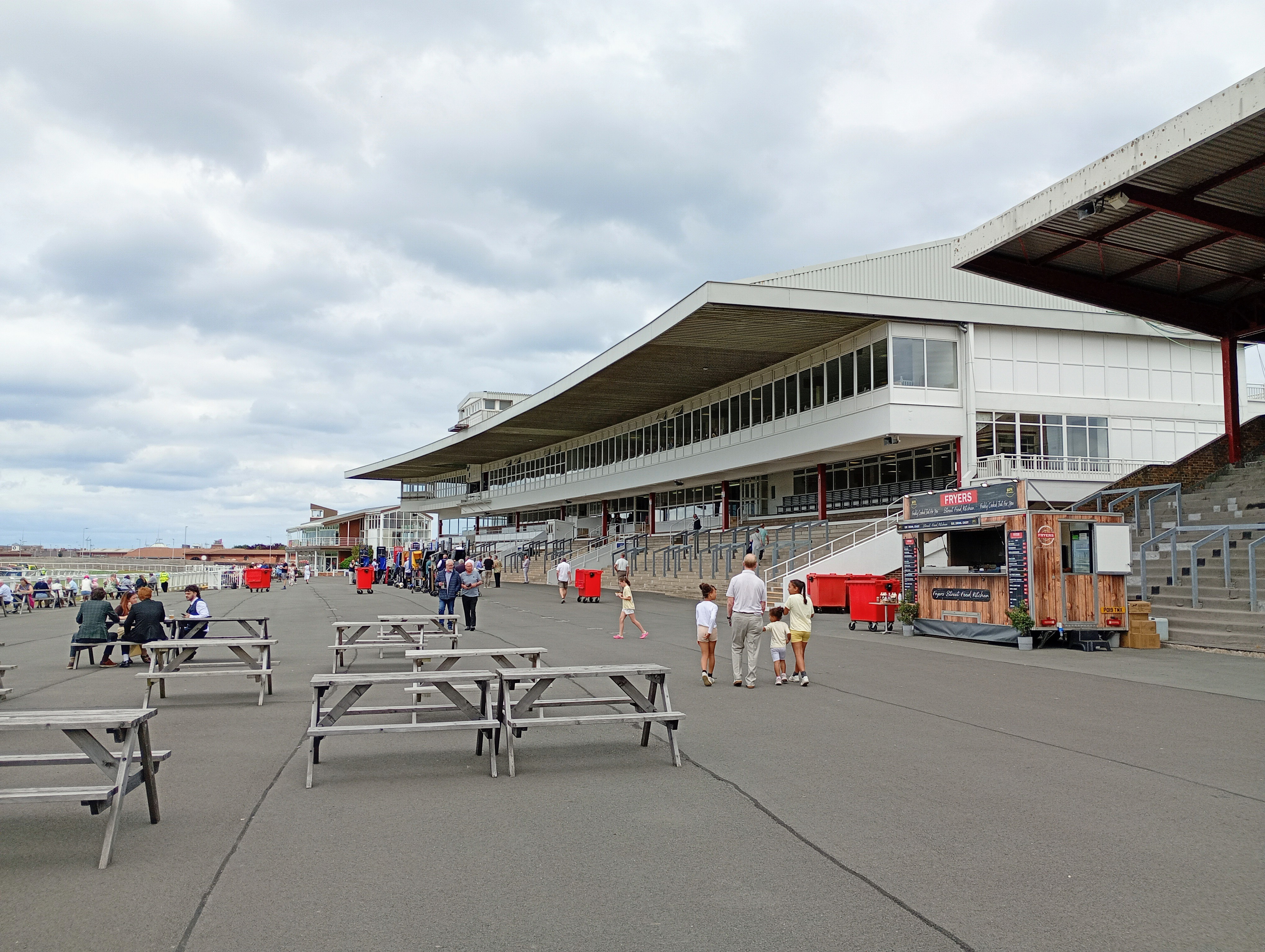
- The grandstand from the south
- Interactive map of Redcar
- Location: Redcar, North Yorkshire
- Owned by: International Racecourse Management
- Date opened: 1872
- Screened on: Racing TV
- Course type: Flat
- Notable races: Zetland Gold Cup; Two-Year-Old Trophy; Guisborough Stakes

Redcar Racecourse is a thoroughbred horse racing venue located in Redcar, North Yorkshire, England. The racecourse was opened in 1872 although racing on Redcar beach far predates this. In 2026, it is scheduled to host eighteen fixtures, including the Zetland Gold Cup and Two-Year-Old Trophy meetings.

== History ==
=== Racing on the beach ===
Racing began at Redcar on the sands at Redcar beach in the early 18th century. A local joiner called Mr Adamson constructed a grandstand and charged for use of it, but the facilities were very rudimentary: the judge's box was in a bathing van, the stewards were in a farm wagon and the run-in was roped. At one meeting on the beach, a race was held between foxhounds and racehorses to determine which were faster but the trail left for the hounds blew into the sea, making the race a fiasco. The Redcar Race Committee was formed in 1850 and from about this time, some meetings were included in the Racing Calendar although others were deemed 'too insignificant'.

Although the racecourse benefitted from the growth of rail travel in the mid-19th century, a Jockey Club ruling that all races had to have a prize of at least £50 made racing on the beach, where spectators couldn't be charged an admission fee, unviable. This caused racing on the beach to cease in 1870. The Cleveland Hunt Cup (worth £30) took place that day and was won by top jockey John Osborne.

=== The current racecourse opens ===
The Race Committee benefitted from the three significant local families with a great interest in the sport: the Newcomen family of Kirkleatham Hall, the Zetland family of Upleatham Hall and the Lowther family of Wilton Castle. It was from the Newcomens (specifically A.H.T. Newcomen) that a twenty-one-year lease was achieved for the land which the racecourse sits on. The lease was to a group led by John Hikeley. Thomas Dawson was appointed clerk of the course and was responsible for putting in drains, levelling the track and returfing where necessary.

The first meeting on the new course was held on 9 August 1872, and it of course remains operational today. At this first meeting, John Osborne (the father of the John Osborne victorious in the final beach race) took the first race, the Zetland Welter Handicap Plate. The admission prices for the first meeting were 6s for the grandstand enclosure, 5s for four-wheeled carriages, a half crown for two-wheeled carriages and tuppence for the course enclosure.

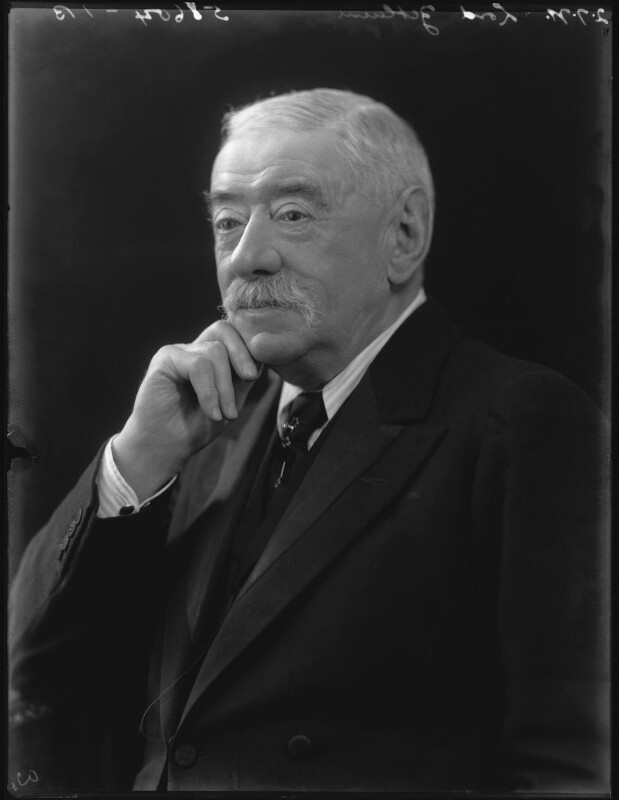
Lawrence Dundas, 1st Marquess of Zetland

In the early years of the new course, the grandstand was a wooden structure assembled for the meeting then dismantled afterwards. The Redcar & Coatham Grand Stand Company (with Arthur Newcomen as chairman) was formed in 1875, with a capital of £4,000 to purchase or lease land and construct a permanent grandstand. It was decided to spend £2,650 on the new stand, described by Newcomen as 'second to none in the Kingdom'. It opened in 1876, with Newcomen announcing its completion to the board by saying 'I believe the racecourse will be so improved and the meetings so managed that Redcar will rank amongst the best race meetings in the North'. Land had also been acquired to construct a straight mile from the Marquess of Zetland.

Developments continued throughout the late 1870s, with a stand built for attendees in the second enclosure in 1877, the aim of the Company being to provide comfort to all those attending the meetings. It was that year that James Lowther, MP for York and a director of the racecourse, stated that he had 'no hesitation in saying we have the second best course in the world', although he didn't specify which he thought was best. Stables followed in 1878, ending the system whereby horses were stabled in the various inns in the town.

Redcar had played host to a National Hunt meeting in October each year until 1878, when fields were extremely poor; the meeting was further marred by Mr J H Peart using his whip on a rival jockey during a race. It was then decided that Redcar would host only flat racing, and the best quality horses and jockeys were encouraged by the introduction of the Grand National Breeders' Foal Stakes in 1880; the second running in 1881 had a purse of £900, an exceptional figure at the time.

In 1879, the racing correspondent for Baily's Monthly Magazine of Sports and Pastimes, and Racing Register, the leading racing publication of its time, visited Redcar and the racecourse and wrote this:

It is because Redcar has a racecourse which far-seeing prophets tell us will become what Stockton once was, that the little meeting is rising in fame. The ground is nearly perfect; and with such good friends as Mr James Lowther, the brothers Vyner, Mr Newcomen, the Earl of Zetland and others, to look up to, there is little doubt about the future of Redcar... Tis a far cry perhaps, for southerners, but it is very nice when you get there; and if the Coatham [Hotel] is full, why Saltburn is only five or six miles away and there the Zetland [Hotel] will open its arms to you and one of the most beautiful sea views the Yorkshire coast can show will spread itself before your eyes. It is the one spot left in the seaside life of England whither German bands come not, nor nigger minstrelsy; where there are no bazaars, or wheels of fortune; no open-work stockings, and no Lesbias [sic] to too tightly lace their robes of gold. Tis peace and quiet all!... Redcar has a pretty stand, convenient business offices, a straight mile, and good going, and for the succeeding meeting at Stockton, Lord Zetland had a special train from Saltburn so that we were able to get away from Mandale Bottoms without being mixed up with the roughs at the Stockton or Middlesbrough stations... If it had not been for Lord Zetland and Mr James Lowther, we fear the August meeting at Redcar would not have been the moderate success it was. But for them Redcar might have joined the knocked-out division, the list of utterly plating meetings that can just manage to exist and that is all.

Arthur Newcomen died in 1884 and was succeeded by Lawrence Dundas, 1st Marquess of Zetland as Chairman. Zetland was a key player in the founding of the course.

The racecourse clearly benefitted from its location in a popular seaside resort at a time when such places were very popular. An 1896 article in Racing Illustrated Magazine claimed 'Redcar has of late years become quite an institution among the north country racegoers, who in visiting the little Yorkshire watering-place are able to unite the pleasures of their favourite sport with the relaxation of a seaside holiday.' A particularly popular meeting was the Whitsuntide meeting which remains today. (Note: The meeting is now held on the Spring Bank Holiday Monday on the last Monday of May, as Whitsuntide ceased being a UK bank holiday and was replaced by this more fixed date in 1972.) 30,000 racegoers were estimated by the Darlington & Stockton Times to have attended on Whit Monday 1936.

=== Later history ===
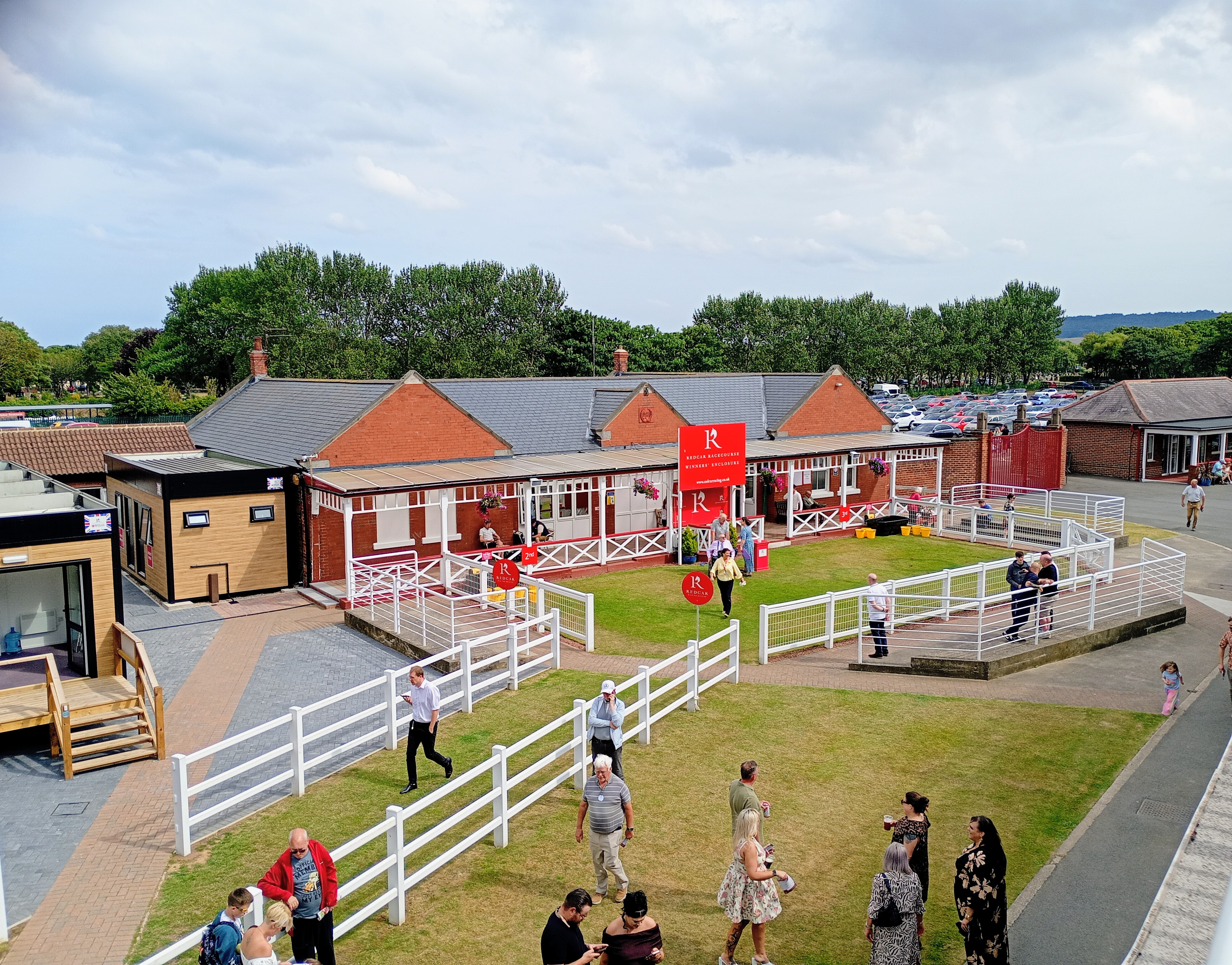
The winner's enclosure

Between 1913 and 1923, Redcar F.C. was based at the racecourse, yet horse racing ceased during both world wars. During the First World War, the racecourse was used for flight training by the Royal Naval Air Service. Following the war, the Grand Stand Company was renamed the Redcar Race Company Ltd, and the current weighing room building next to the winner's enclosure was constructed in the 1920s.

The course would become an army camp during World War II, and three furlongs of the home straight was dug up. This perhaps inevitably led to a degree of neglect befalling the racecourse, with the stands and course in poor condition and the racecourse hosting only four days of racing per year.

In 1946, Major Leslie Petch OBE (the grandson of John Hikeley) took charge, and he achieved great improvements at the track due to his capabilities regarding publicity, utilisation of race sponsorship and an understanding of public demands. Redcar was the first racecourse in the UK to have a timing clock, furlong posts and CCTV, and was also early to adopt coloured racecards in the early 1950s. The first ever transmission of racing on colour TV may also have been at Redcar, during the 1960s. The Levy Board were impressed by the success achieved during Petch's tenure and advanced £250,000 for a new grandstand, made necessary by overcrowding in the Tattersalls and Club enclosures. It was erected in 1964 and is still at the racecourse today.

Following Petch's retirement in 1971, the Zetland family took control of the racecourse. Lord Zetland introduced the Two-Year-Old Trophy race. Zetland sold part of the Redcar Racecourse land to supermarket chain, Safeway, for £3,600,000 in 1988 in order to finance major developments on the racecourse including new stables and the Paddock Rooms stand. This necessitated reconfiguration of the bend into the back straight.

On 30 July 1980, prolific owner Sheikh Hamdan bin Rashid Al Maktoum had his first winner in the UK with Mushref.

In 1996, International Racecourse Management took control of the racecourse. IRM also manages Wetherby and Catterick. The nephew of Major Leslie Petch, John Sanderson (who set up IRM), became chairman in 2018, replacing Lord Zetland. His son Jonjo is as of 2026 the Clerk of the Course at Redcar.

In 2000, Lord Zetland resigned as racecourse chairman and revealed plans to close Redcar Racecourse and open a new 'supercourse' in Dunsdale at a cost of £100mn, which was unpopular in the local area. Zetland took back power from the board of directors in 2006 after opposition amongst shareholders to a £3.5mn plan to realign the course and sell some of the spare land for housing development. The Redcar Action Group (RAG) was set up in opposition to the proposals and the plan has since fallen through, likely never to be revived in the foreseeable future after Lord Zetland's death in 2026.

In 2006, Redcar staged the traditional opening meeting of the British flat season, featuring the Lincoln Handicap. Doncaster was at this time undergoing redevelopment.

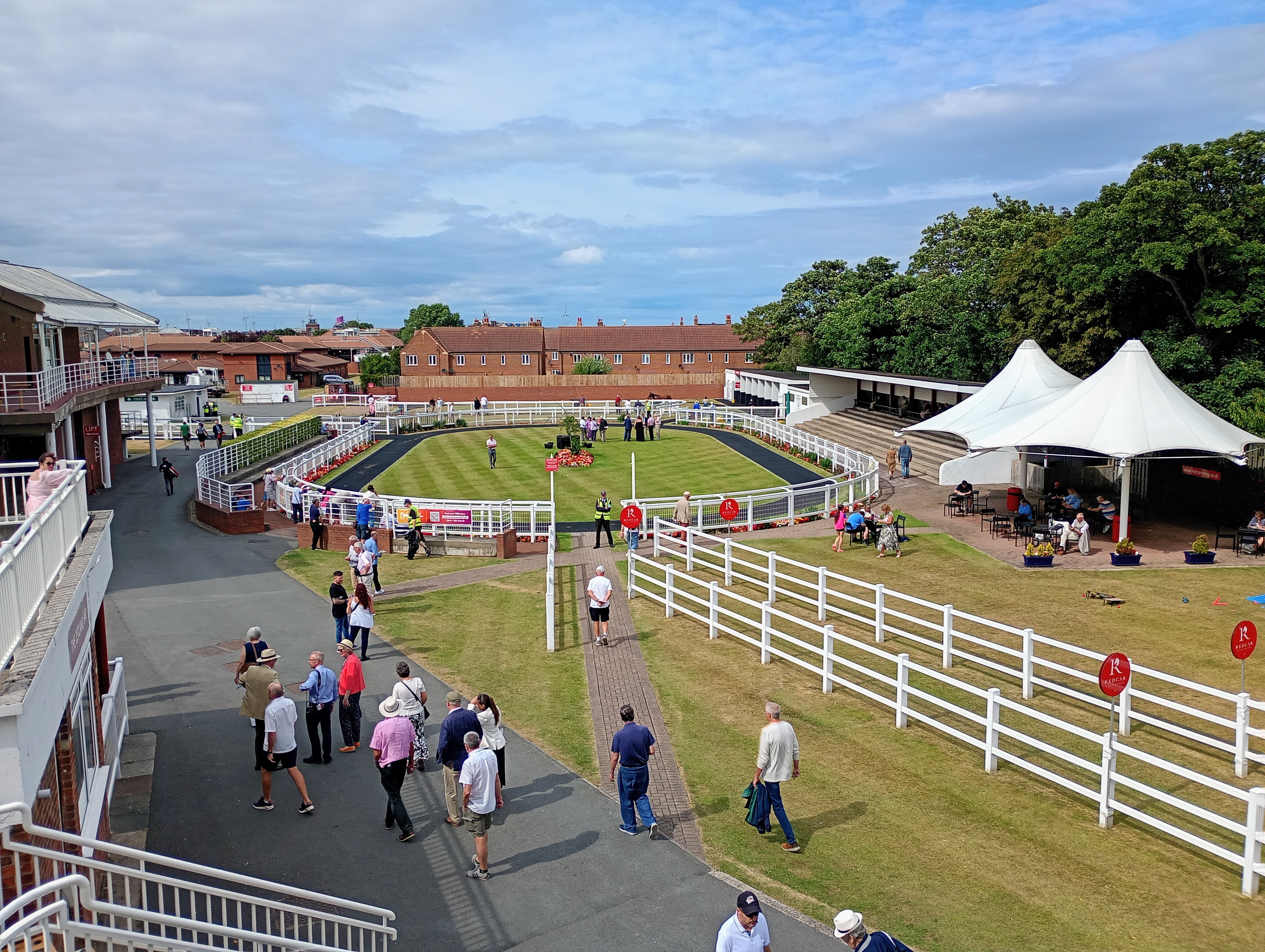
The parade ring

In recent years, the racecourse has suffered from vandalism and theft. In 2016, a JCB dumper caused damage to the railings and crushed a gate and an ATV Polaris buggy was stolen in 2026, which was estimated to cost at least £12,000 to replace.

The course was forced by the British Horseracing Authority to upgrade its weighing room facilities or face losing its licence to race as jockeys like Tom Marquand criticised the current facilities; Marquand complained about having to ride an exercise bike in the valets' laundry, whilst a stretching mat was located in a confined space between rows of lockers. The upgrades (completed for the 2026 season) cost £600,000 and saw modern weighing room facilities for male and female jockeys (meaning the female riders no longer had to walk through the crowd to their facilities); a new building was constructed for the racecourse office.

== Course ==
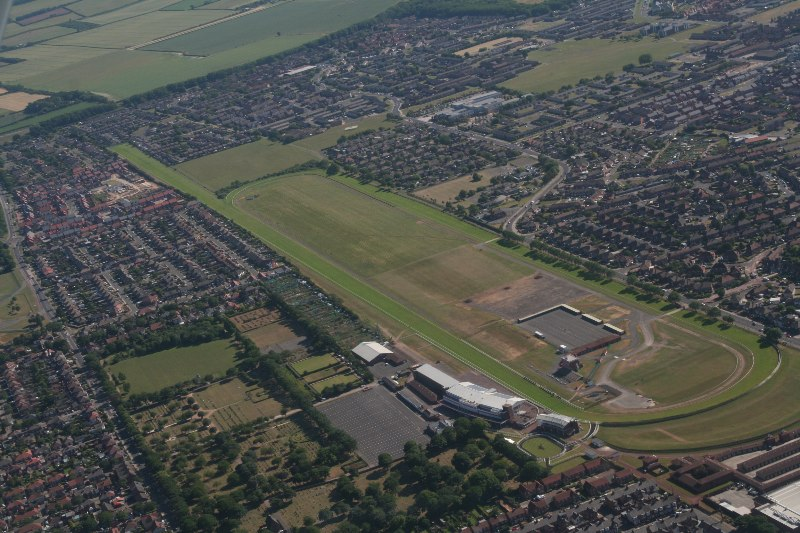
The racecourse from the air

Redcar is a left-handed, perfectly flat elongated oval of roughly one mile and six furlongs with relatively tight bends that can unbalance some horses. There is also a three-furlong chute that joins the track where the top bend meets the straight, providing a one-mile course which is entirely flat and perfectly straight. The course is generally considered fair but can pose a challenge for hold-up horses if the ground is fast; this is fairly common as the ground drains well.

The course used to have a hazardous camber on the turn into the home straight, but this was banked in the 1960s or early 1970s. The racecourse used to have a nine-furlong straight, but the last furlong was sold for housing, reducing it to the mile. The north bend has also been reconfigured twice, first after land was sold to Safeway in 1988 then again in the 2006-07 off-season. The latter caused one meeting in 2006 and two in 2007 to be transferred to other courses.

== Notable races ==
The Zetland Gold Cup has remained a prestigious race since its founding in 1950, being worth £40,000 in 2026. In 1959, the Vaux Gold Tankard run over one mile and six furlongs (described in the 1960s as Europe's greatest handicap in racecards) was first run, and it lasted until 1980. The Andy Capp Handicap was described as 'the North's richest three-year-old handicap' and was run over six furlongs from 1963 to 1985. The race was sponsored by The Daily Mirror, whose punters' club would win the race with Mirror Boy in 1980. Lord Zetland would introduce the Two-Year-Old Trophy (originally called the Racecall Gold Trophy) in 1989, and it was upgraded to Listed level in 2004. Notable winners of this most lucrative race at Redcar include Pipalong, Captain Rio, Somnus and Limato. Redcar's other Listed race is the Guisborough Stakes, introduced in 2003.

Month	DOW	Race Name	Type	Grade	Distance	Age/Sex
May	Monday	Zetland Gold Cup	Flat	Handicap	1m 2f	3yo+
October	Saturday	Two-Year-Old Trophy	Flat	Listed	6f	2yo
October	Saturday	Guisborough Stakes	Flat	Listed	7f	3yo+

== Gallery ==
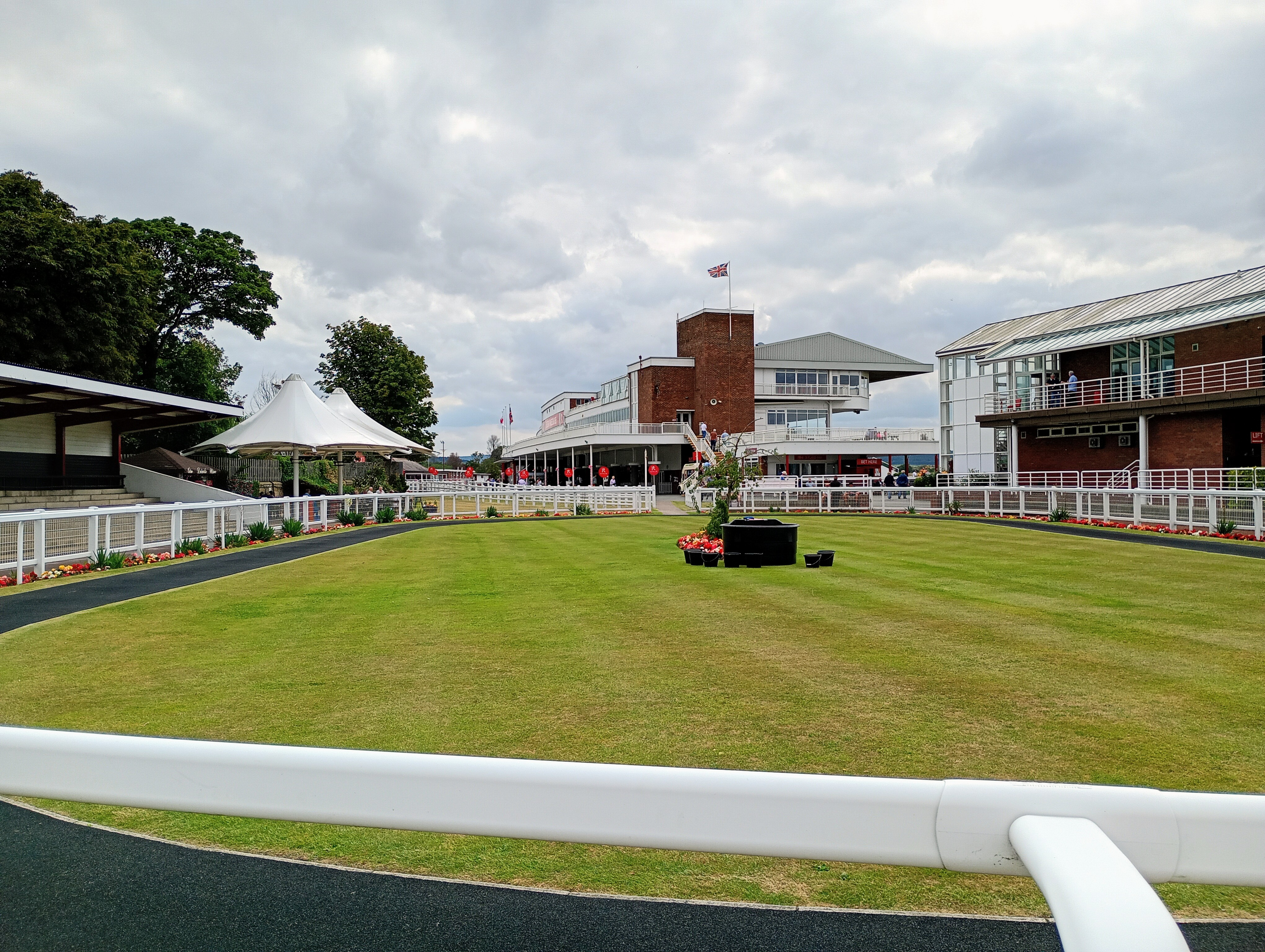
The parade ring area with the grandstand in the background

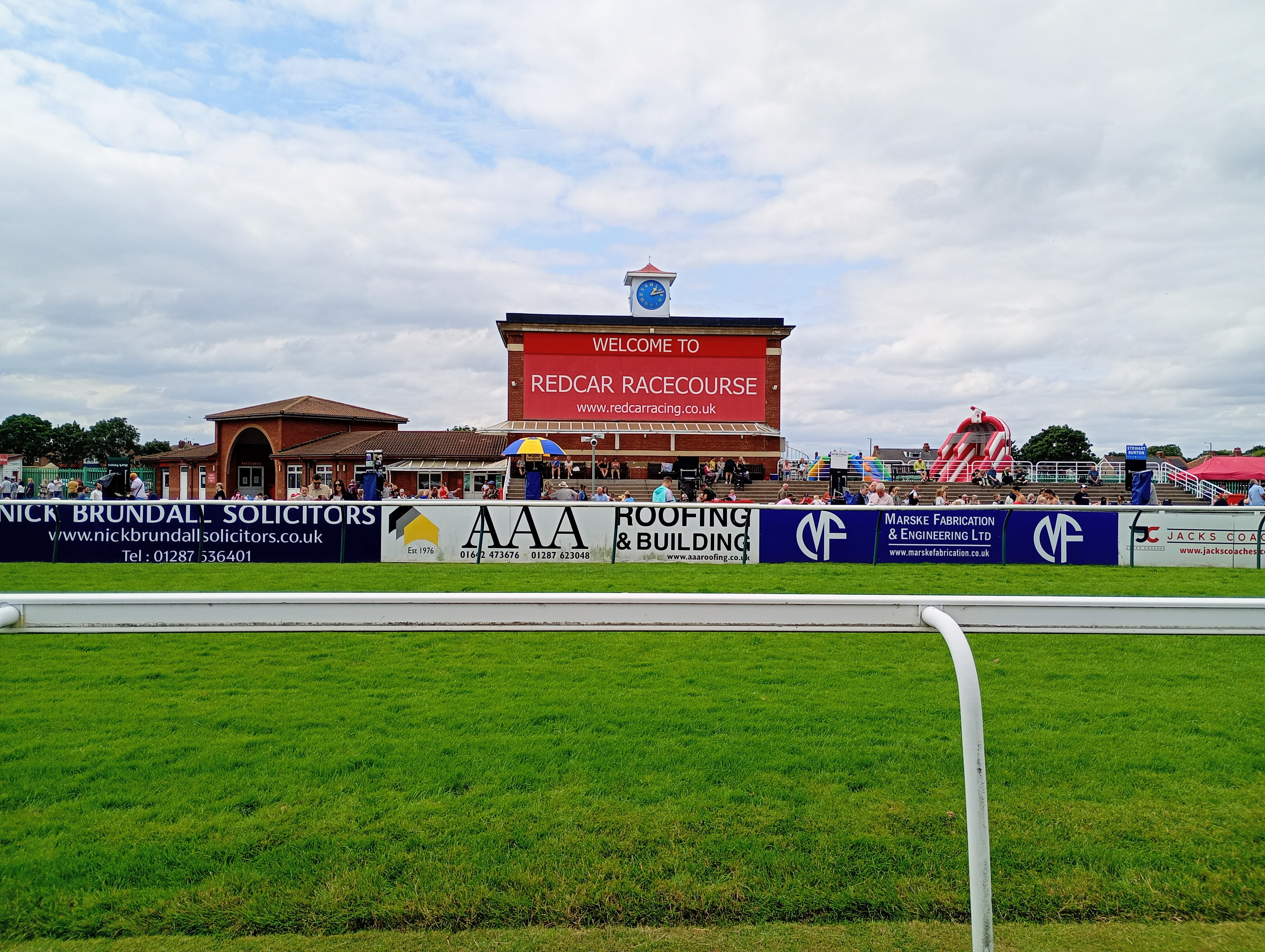
The course enclosure and former Tote board

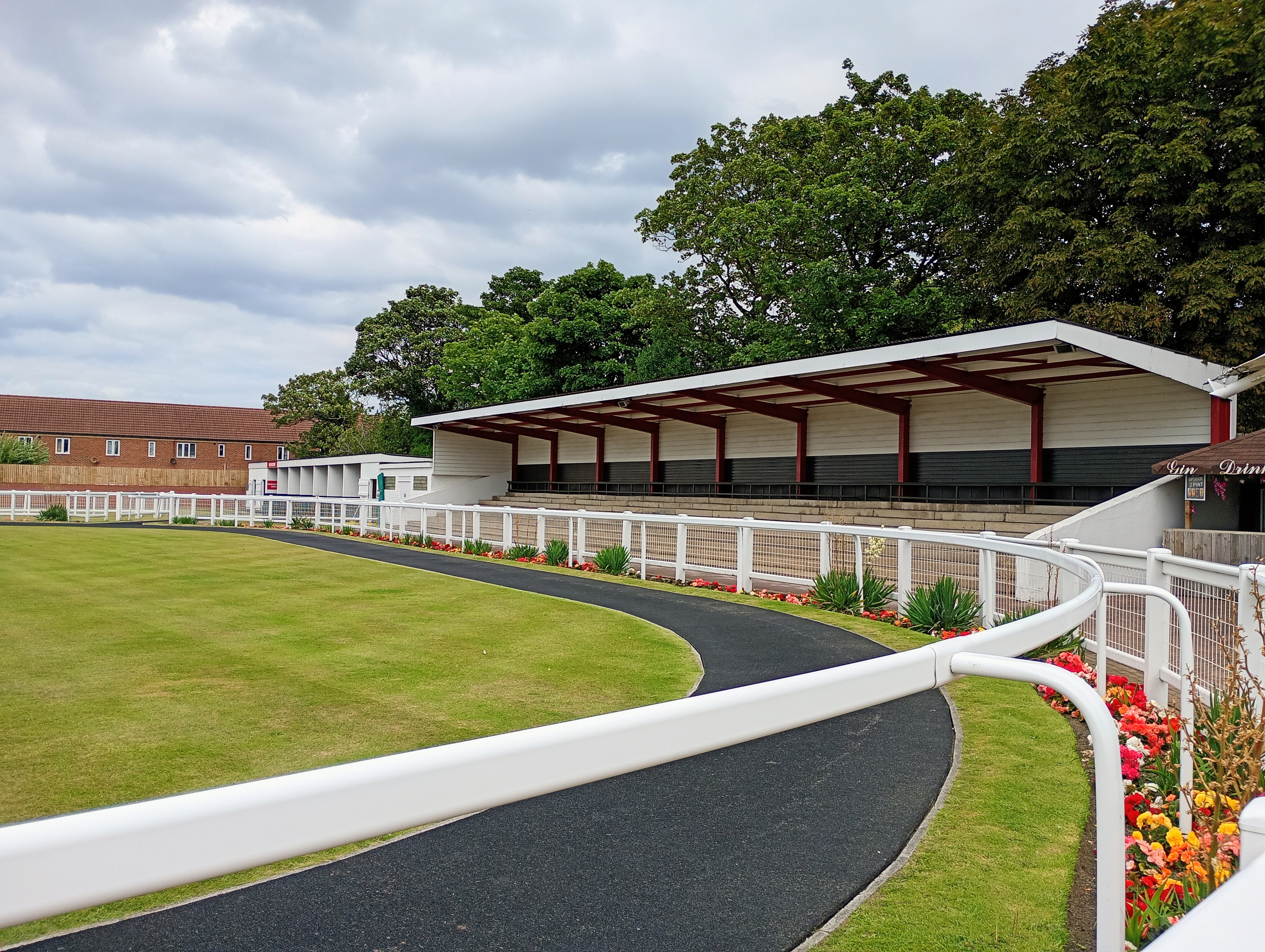
The small stand round the parade ring

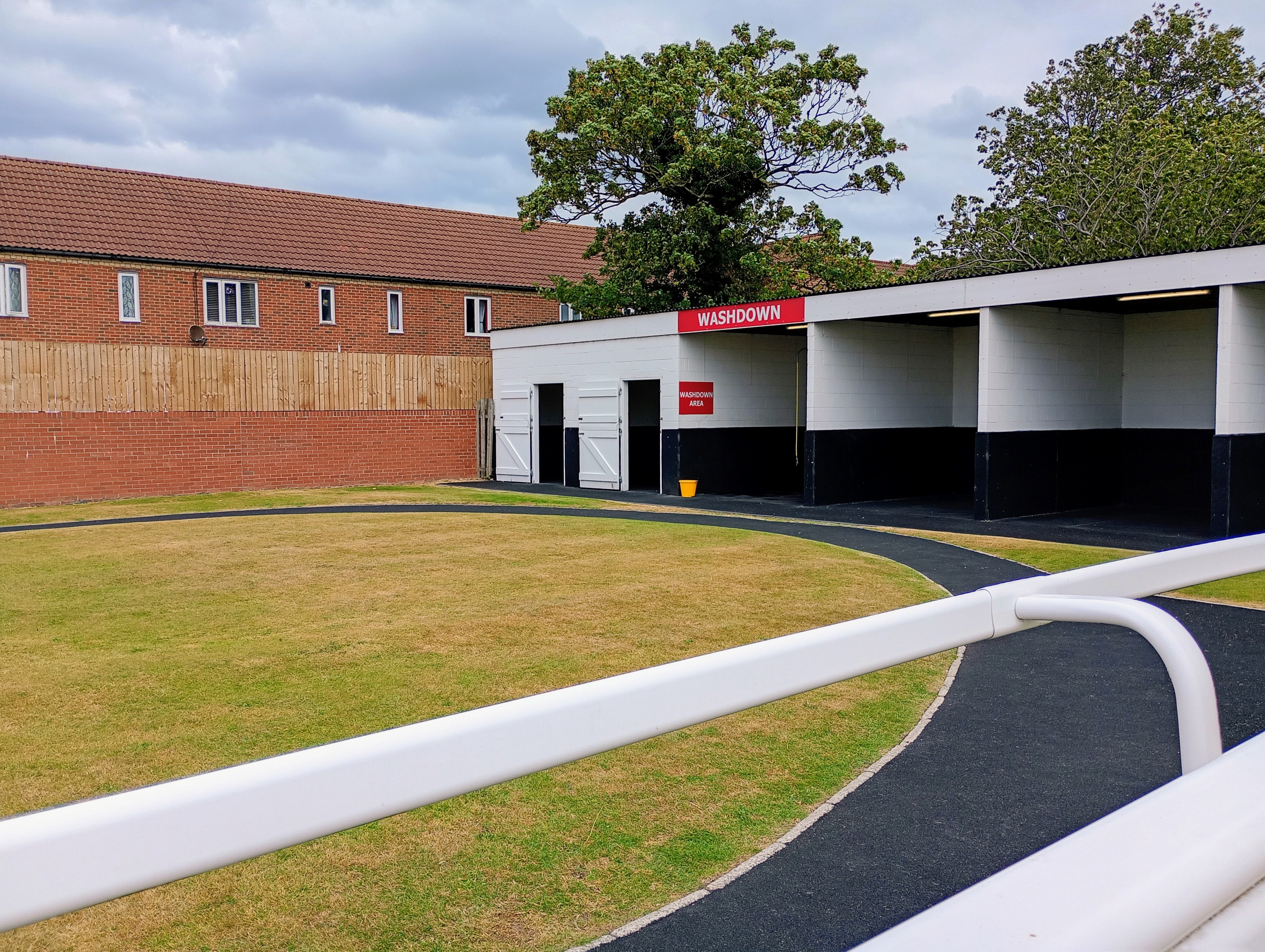
The pre-parade ring area and saddling boxes

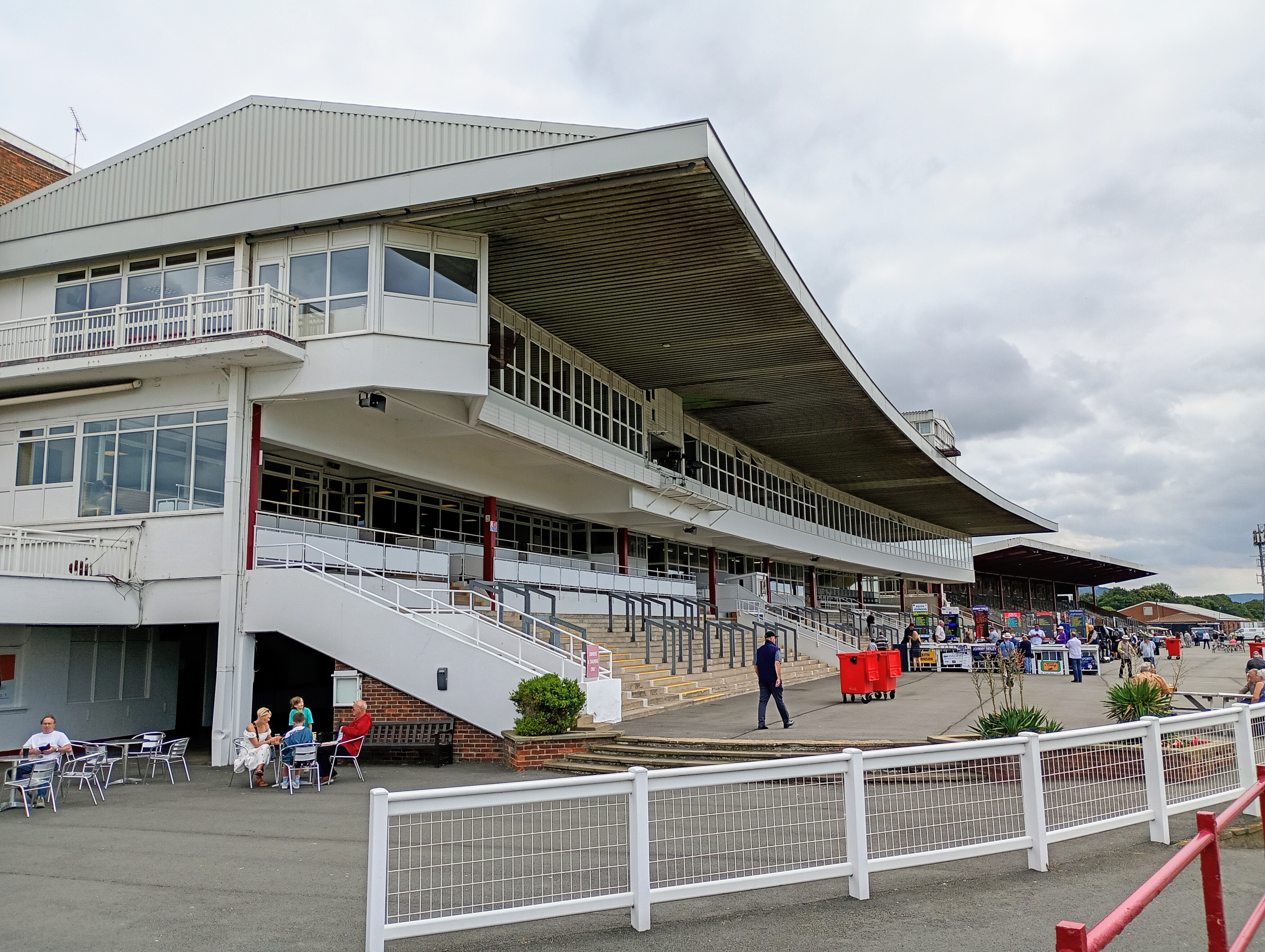
The grandstand from the north

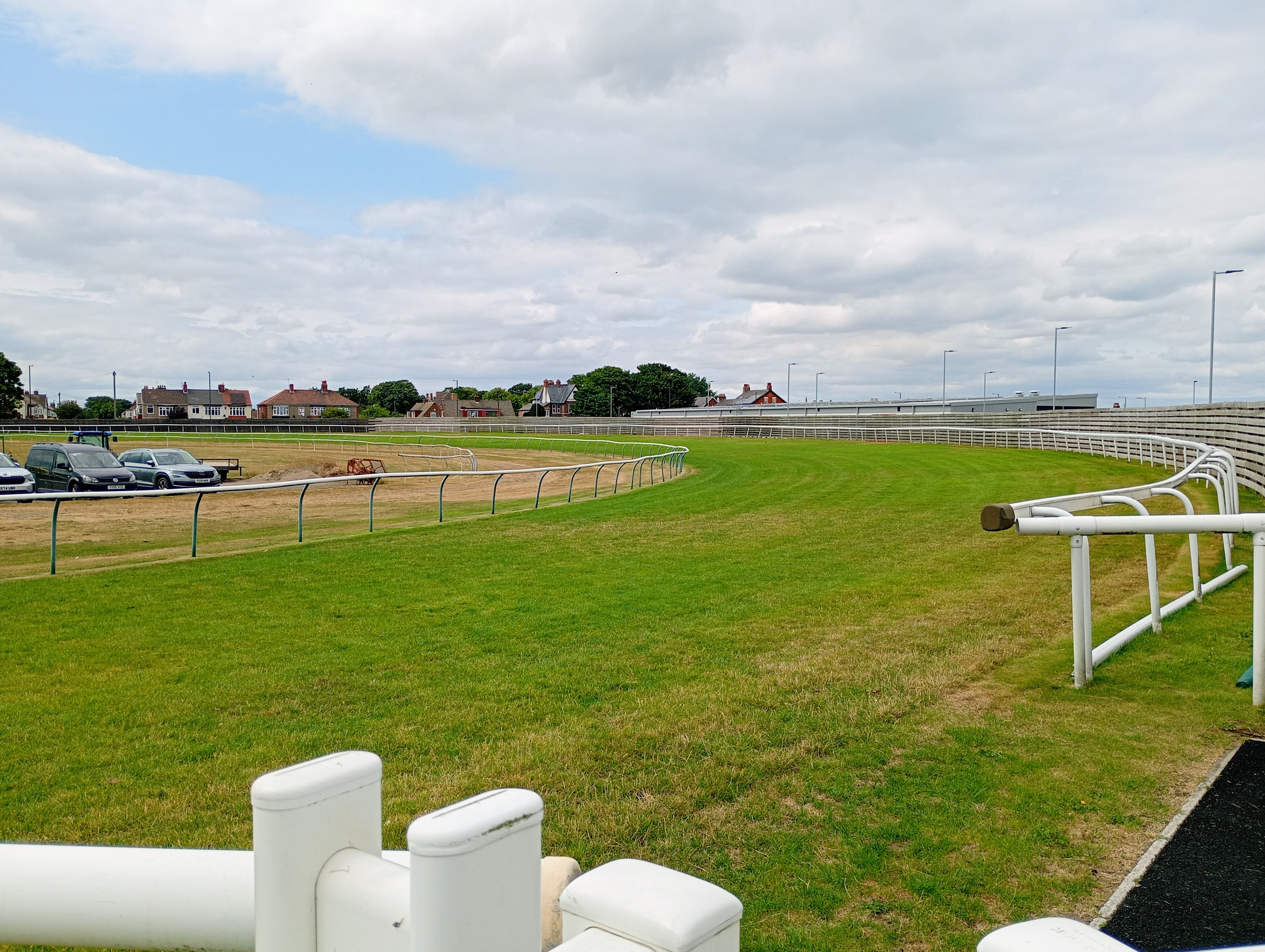
The turn into the back straight

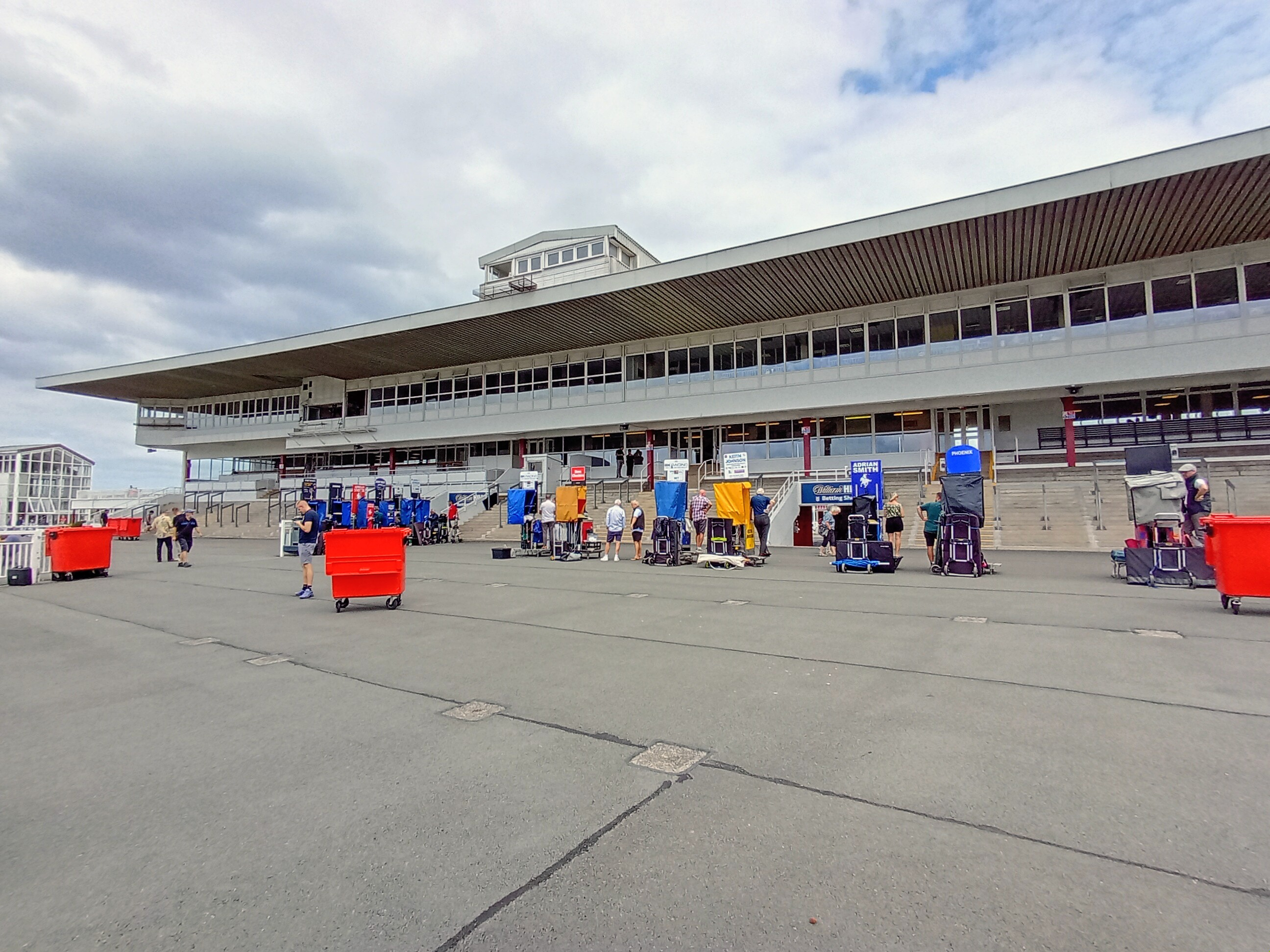
The betting ring and grandstand

== Bibliography ==
- Gill, James (1975). Racecourses of Great Britain. London: Barrie & Jenkins. ISBN 0-2142-0090-6.
- Mortimer, Roger (1971). The Encyclopaedia of Flat Racing. London: Robert Hale. ISBN 0-7091-1531-8.
- Mortimer, Roger; Onslow, Richard; Willett, Peter (1978). Biographical Encyclopaedia of British Flat Racing. London: Macdonald and Jane's. ISBN 0-354-08536-0.
- Neal, Tom (2021). The Famous Yorkshiremen: The Forgotten History of Redcar's Footballing Pioneers. London: Old Bird Publishing. ISBN 978-1-3999-0699-9.
