= Limato =

Irish-bred Thoroughbred racehorse

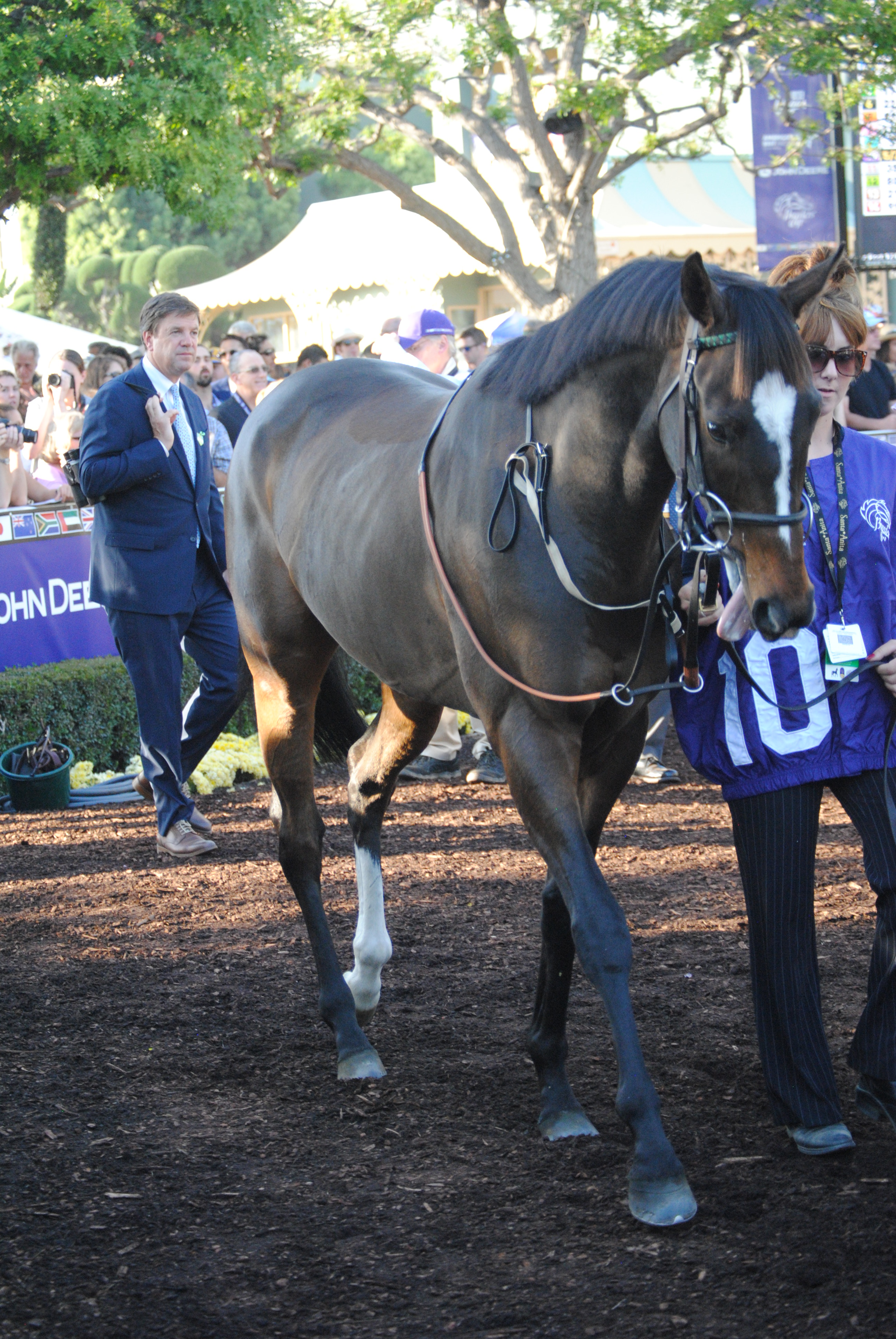
- Limato at the 2016 Breeders' Cup
- Sire: Tagula
- Grandsire: Taufan
- Dam: Come April
- Damsire: Singspiel
- Sex: Gelding
- Foaled: 8 February 2012
- Country: Ireland
- Colour: Bay
- Breeder: Seamus Phelan
- Owner: Paul G Jacobs
- Trainer: Henry Candy
- Record: 33: 14-6-1
- Earnings: £1,418,788

Major wins
- Rose Bowl Stakes (2014); Two-Year-Old Trophy (2014); Pavilion Stakes (2015); Park Stakes (2015); July Cup (2016); Prix de la Forêt (2016); Challenge Stakes (2017, 2018); Hopeful Stakes (2018); Garrowby Stakes (2018); Criterion Stakes (2019, 2020)

Awards
- World's Top-rated sprinter (2016)

Limato (foaled 8 February 2012) is a retired Irish-bred, British-trained Thoroughbred racehorse. He was a sprinter who produced his best performances over six and seven furlongs on good or firm ground. In a racing career lasting from June 2014 to September 2020 he ran 33 times and won 14 races, including two at Group One level. He achieved the feat of winning at least one Group or Listed race in each of his seven racing seasons.

Limato was one of the best British juveniles of 2014 when he was undefeated in four races including the Rose Bowl Stakes and the Two-Year-Old Trophy, although, as a gelding he was ineligible to run in many of the most important races. In the following year he won the Pavilion Stakes and the Park Stakes as well as finishing second in the Commonwealth Cup and the Prix de la Forêt. As a four-year-old he recorded his first Group One success in the July Cup before finishing second in the Nunthorpe Stakes and then winning the Prix de la Forêt.

At five Limato was placed twice in Group One races and returned to winning form when taking the Challenge Stakes in October. In 2018 he struggled for form early in the year but went on to win the Hopeful Stakes, Garrowby Stakes and a second Challenge Stakes. He continued to compete in Group races in 2019 and 2020, winning the Criterion Stakes in both seasons, before being retired in October 2020.

== Background ==
Limato is a bay gelding with a white blaze and white socks on his hind legs bred in Ireland by Seamus Phelan. His sire Tagula was a sprinter who whose wins included the July Stakes, Prix Morny in 1995 and the Supreme Stakes in 1996. As a breeding stallion he has produced several other major winners, most notably the leading miler Canford Cliffs. Limato's dam Come April recorded her only success in a ten-furlong maiden race on the Polytrack at Lingfield Park as a three-year-old in 2007. Her grand-dam Sumoto was a very successful broodmare who also produced Compton Admiral and Summoner.

As yearling colt in August 2013 Limato was put up for auction at Doncaster Premier Yearling sale and was bought for £41,000 by the bloodstock agents Peter & Ross Doyle. He entered the ownership of Paul G Jacobs and was initially sent into training with Richard Hannon Sr. Jacobs named the horse Limato after the opening letters of the names of his wife, father and mother.

== Racing career ==
=== 2014: two-year-old season ===
Before his racecourse debut Limato was gelded and transferred to the table of the veteran Henry Candy at Kingston Warren in Oxfordshire. Limato made his first appearance on 11 June on the synthetic track at Kempton Park Racecourse when he contested a six furlong maiden race and won "comfortably" by two and a half lengths from the Charlie Appleby-trained favourite Hawkesbury. Two weeks later the gelding started 4/6 favourite for a race over the same course and distance and won "easily" from five opponents after taking the lead a furlong out. On 18 July Limato was moved up in class and tried on turf for the first time when he ran in the Listed Rose Bowl Stakes on good-to-firm ground at Newbury Racecourse. He was made the 11/8 second favourite behind Adaay, a colt who had won his first two races before running poorly when joint-favourite for the Coventry Stakes. Ridden by James Doyle he tracked the leader Cotai Glory before taking the lead inside the final furlong and winning "readily" by one and a quarter lengths. Candy commented "I thought James was enormously confident. He said he was so green going down, he'd only had two starts under the lights at Kempton and had a good look around... He's always been a horse I have thought a lot of but he needed the education today and that's what he got."

After a break of over two months Limato returned in the Listed Two-Year-Old Trophy at Redcar Racecourse on 4 October and started the 6/5 favourite against twenty-two opponents. Ridden by Graham Lee he was among the leaders from the start, went to the front approaching the final furlong and won "smoothly" by one and a half lengths from Mattmu. Candy commented "You don't get them like that very often. It was a most amazing performance. I think Graham was absolutely blown away by it. He didn't know what to say when he came back. It was wonderful... I'd say this horse was as good as any I've trained".

=== 2015: three-year-old season ===
Limato began his second season in the Group Three Pavilion Stakes on good-to-firm ground at Ascot Racecourse on 29 April and started the 6/4 favourite. Hawkesbury and Adaay were again in opposition whilst the best-fancied of the other nine runners was the John Gosden-trained filly Tendu. Racing down the centre of the track, he took the lead a furlong out and won by one and a half lengths from Tendu, with Adaay another length and a half back in third. After the race Candy said "He was very rusty and he's had a real good blow after that. I've not been able to get him fit at home as he's not been doing much. James was quite forceful early on and the penny then seemed to drop". A month later he was moved up to Group Two class for the Sandy Lane Stakes at Haydock Park and started favourite but sustained his first defeat as he was beaten a length into second place by Adaay. At Royal Ascot in June he started the 9/2 second favourite for the inaugural running of the Group One Commonwealth Cup. After being restrained by Doyle towards the rear of the eighteen-runner field in the early stages he made steady progress in the last quarter mile to finish second to Muhaarar.

After a break of almost three months Limato returned to the track in the Group Two Park Stakes at Doncaster Racecourse in September. Ridden by Andrea Atzeni he started 9/2 favourite in a fifteen-runner field, with the best-fancied of his opponents being Home of the Brave (European Free Handicap), Lightning Moon (Bengough Stakes), Safety Check (Zabeel Mile) and Ivawood (Richmond Stakes). After starting slowly and overcoming some trouble in running he took the lead entering the final furlong before drawing away to win "readily" by three and three quarter lengths from Markaz. Atzeni said "It's amazing, amazing, like driving a Ferrari." whilst Candy commented "That was very exciting... He just goes to sleep in the stalls. Today he stayed asleep and got into every bit of trouble going, but as soon as he sees daylight he's a help to any jockey. I was desperate to run him today because he's just been going up the gallops for four months. Any horse is going to get pretty bored with that".

Limato ended his second season with a trip to France and a move up in distance when he contested the Prix de la Forêt over 1400 metres at Longchamp Racecourse on 4 October. Ridden by Ryan Moore he came from the rear of the field to make a strong challenge in the last 200 metres but was beaten into second place by Make Believe.

=== 2016: four-year-old season ===
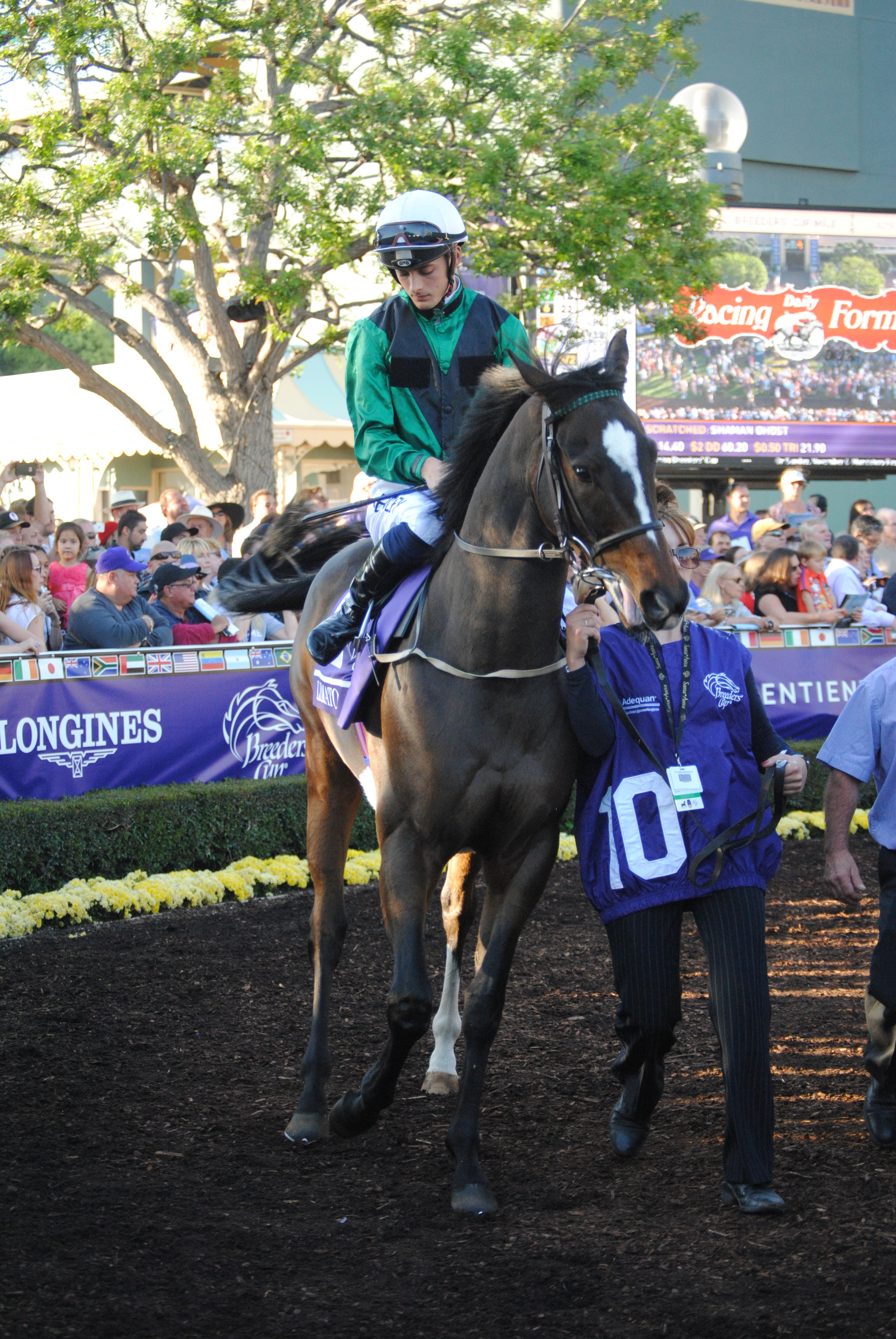
Limato before the 2016 Breeders' Cup Mile with jockey Harry Bentley

Harry Bentley took over as Limato's regular jockey in 2016. On his seasonal debut, the gelding was tried over a mile in the Lockinge Stakes at Newbury and finished fourth behind Belardo after struggling to obtain a clear run in the last quarter mile. On 9 July Limato was dropped back to sprint distances for the Group One July Cup at Newmarket Racecourse and started the 9/2 favourite. His seventeen opponents included Quiet Reflection, Air Force Blue, Sole Power, Magical Memory (Duke of York Stakes), Twilight Son (Haydock Sprint Cup), Profitable (King's Stand Stakes), and Mongolian Saturday (Breeders' Cup Turf Sprint). After tracking the leaders, Limato took the lead accelerated clear in the final furlong and won in "impressive" style by two lengths from Suedois despite hanging badly to the right in the final strides. After the race Harry Bentley explained that he had been offered the ride on the gelding in late 2015 by the owner Paul Jacobs and said that he had "snatched his arm off" in accepting the offer. Candy mused about the possibility of moving the gelding up to a mile again, saying "I've been trying to train him to stay all through the year. I think he'll probably do it OK."

Despite Candy's predictions Limato was dropped to five furlongs for the first time in his racing career when he started 15/8 favourite for the Group One Nunthorpe Stakes at York Racecourse in August. He finished strongly but was unable to peg back the five-year-old mare Mecca's Angel and was beaten two lengths into second place. On 2 October the gelding made his second attempt to win the Prix de La Foret (run at Chantilly Racecourse) and was made the odds-on favourite. His ten opponents included Jimmy Two Times (Prix de la Porte Maillot), Suedois, Attendu (Prix du Palais-Royal), Trixia (Prix de Lieurey) and Birchwood (Superlative Stakes). After tracking the leaders Limato took the lead 350 metres from the finish and drew away to win "comfortably" by three lengths from the 40/1 outsider Karar. After the race Candy said "He was cantering and then quickened up in proper Limato style. He looked like he was starting to go a bit rusty in his coat today, but if he's absolutely bouncing we would have to discuss going to the Breeders' Cup."

On 5 November Limato was sent to the United States to contest the Breeders' Cup Mile at Santa Anita Park and started the 3.4/1 favourite ahead of the 2015 winner Tepin. He finished sixth of the fourteen runners, three and a half lengths behind the winner Tourist. Candy commented "there are no excuses. I just think it's late enough in the year for him... Not many of my horses function in November."

=== 2017: five-year-old season ===
In the early spring of 2017 Limato was set to race in Dubai and he made his seasonal debut in the Al Quoz Sprint over 1200 metres at Meydan Racecourse on 25 March. Ridden by Bentley he started second favourite behind the locally trained Ertiaal but was never in contention and came home tenth of the twelve runners. Despite his poor effort in Dubai, Limato was made the 2/1 favourite in a nineteen-runner field for the Diamond Jubilee Stakes at Royal Ascot on 24 June. Racing on his favoured firm ground, the gelding came from off the pace to deliver a strong late challenge but was hampered in the closing stages and finished third behind The Tin Man and Tasleet. In the following month Limato attempted to repeat his 2016 success in the July Cup and produced a very good effort in defeat as he finished second to the three-year-old Harry Angel with Caravaggio, The Tin Man and Tasleet unplaced. The ground was softer at Goodwood on 1 August when the gelding started favourite for the Lennox Stakes. He took the lead a furlong out but was overtaken in the closing stages and finished fourth in a "blanket finish" behind Breton Rock, Home of the Brave and Suedois.

After a lengthy break Limato returned for the Group 2 Challenge Stakes over the straight seven furlongs at Newmarket on 13 October and started 6/4 favourite in an eleven-runner field. The best-fancied of his opponents were Massaat (Hungerford Stakes), Dabyah (Fred Darling Stakes), Dutch Connection (2016 Lennox Stakes) and Gifted Master (Pavilion Stakes). Limato raced up the stands-side (the left-hand side from the jockey's viewpoint) as Gifted Master set the pace in the centre of the wide Newmarket straight. Bentley moved the favourite forward to take the lead approaching the final furlong and Limato drew right away in the closing stages to win by three and a half lengths from Massaat, with the veteran Gordon Lord Byron taking third place.

=== 2018: six-year-old season ===
Limato struggled for form in the first half of 2017 finishing towards the rear of the field in the Lockinge Stakes, the Queen Anne Stakes and the July Cup. On 25 August he was dropped in class for the Listed Hopeful Stakes over six furlongs at Newmarket in which he was ridden by Martin Harley. Starting at odds of 4/1 in a seven-runner field he went to the front a furlong out and won "comfortably" by a length from Top Score. Harry Bentley resumed his partnership with the gelding when Limato started 4/9 favourite for the Listed Garrowby Stakes at York Racecourse in September. After tracking the leaders he took the lead well inside the final furlong and drew away in the closing strides to win by two lengths.

On 12 October Limato attempted to repeat his 2017 success in the Challenge Stakes and started the 7/4 favourite against seven opponents including D'bai (John of Gaunt Stakes), Mankib (Dubai Duty Free Cup), Dancing Star (Sceptre Stakes), Zonderland (Sovereign Stakes) and Gordon Lord Byron. He raced in mid-division before making a forward move in the last quarter mile. He took the lead a furlong out and won by one and a quarter lengths from Zonderland with D'bai a length away in third place. In the British Champions Sprint Stakes at Ascot on 20 October Limato was in touch with the leaders for most of the way but faded in the final furlong to come home ninth of the fourteen runners.

=== 2019: seven-year-old season ===
On his 2019 debut Limato finished fourth behind Invincible Army, Major Jumbo and Yafta in the Group 3 Duke of York Stakes at York on 15 May. At Newmarket on 29 June the gelding started the 11/4 favourite for the seven furlong Criterion Stakes, with the best-fancied of his seven opponents being Glorious Journey (Prix Daphnis), Suedois and Cardsharp (July Stakes). After tracking the leaders, Limato took the lead approaching the final furlong and held on "gamely" to win by a neck and half a length from Glorious Journey and Suedois. Henry Candy commented: "He loves it here. He loves going up and down hills, it is like Kingston Warren... he was idling towards the end. Harry is adamant he won with plenty in hand, and although it didn't look like it to me, Harry should know as he was on top. Ideally he likes to come a little bit later than that."

Limato contested his fourth July Cup on 13 July but ran poorly and came home last of the twelve runners behind Ten Sovereigns. In August he started favourite for the Supreme Stakes at Goodwood but finished sixth to Suedois. He ended the season with an attempt to complete a hat-trick in the Challenge Stakes and produced an improved effort to finish second to the Lockinge Stakes winner Mustashry.

=== 2020: eight-year-old season ===
The 2020 flat racing season in Britain was disrupted and delayed by the COVID-19 pandemic and Limato did not begin his campaign until 27 June when he attempted to repeat his 2019 success in the Criterion Stakes. Starting the 5/1 second favourite in a nine-runner field he came with a strong run from the rear to gain the advantage a furlong out and drew away in the final strides to win by three and a half lengths. His 75-year-old trainer commented "He has to be ridden for that turn of foot. He was quite impressive today – just like me he is getting better with age. What a performance. It is absolutely amazing and it has taken me back a bit. It is indescribable and just great to see, as he has got a great following". On his next racecourse appearance he finished fifth behind the three-year-old Wichita in the Park Stakes at Doncaster on 12 September.

Limato was being prepared for a final run in the Challenge Stakes but after being found to be slightly lame Paul Jacobs announced that the horse was being retired from racing. Jacobs explained that Limato would be sent to be retrained as a show horse at the Collins Farm in Essex. Candy said "He treated every day as if it was his first day in training. He was a real enthusiast who always went up the gallops as though he had never done it before, even though he had been doing it for seven years. He has been a joy to train."

== Assessment ==
In the 2016 edition of the World's Best Racehorse Rankings Limato was given a rating of 122, making him the 18th best racehorse in the world and the second-best horse trained in Britain. He was rated equal with the Australian gelding Chautauqua as the world's best sprinter. He was named after the famous opera singer John Limato.

== Pedigree ==
Pedigree of Limato (IRE), bay gelding, 2012
Sire Tagula (IRE) 1993	Taufan (USA); 1977	Stop The Music	Hail To Reason
Sire Tagula (IRE) 1993	Taufan (USA); 1977	Stop The Music	Bebopper
Sire Tagula (IRE) 1993	Taufan (USA); 1977	Stolen Date	Sadair
Sire Tagula (IRE) 1993	Taufan (USA); 1977	Stolen Date	Stolen Hour
Sire Tagula (IRE) 1993	Twin Island (IRE); 1989	Standaan	Zeddaan
Sire Tagula (IRE) 1993	Twin Island (IRE); 1989	Standaan	Castania
Sire Tagula (IRE) 1993	Twin Island (IRE); 1989	Jolly Widow	Busted
Sire Tagula (IRE) 1993	Twin Island (IRE); 1989	Jolly Widow	Veuve Joyeuse
Dam Come April (GB) 2004	Singspiel (IRE); 1992	In The Wings	Sadler's Wells
Dam Come April (GB) 2004	Singspiel (IRE); 1992	In The Wings	High Hawk
Dam Come April (GB) 2004	Singspiel (IRE); 1992	Glorious Song	Halo
Dam Come April (GB) 2004	Singspiel (IRE); 1992	Glorious Song	Ballade
Dam Come April (GB) 2004	So Admirable (GB); 1998	Suave Dancer	Green Dancer
Dam Come April (GB) 2004	So Admirable (GB); 1998	Suave Dancer	Suavite
Dam Come April (GB) 2004	So Admirable (GB); 1998	Sumoto	Mtoto
Dam Come April (GB) 2004	So Admirable (GB); 1998	Sumoto	Soemba (Family: 7-a)
