= Guisborough Stakes =

Flat horse race in Britain

Guisborough Stakes
2026
Sondad	Witness Stand	Myal

Previous years
2025
Elim	Myal	Volterra
2024
Grey's Monument	Northern Express	Ramazan
2023
Vafortino	Ramazan	Awaal
2022
I'm A Gambler	Rhythm Master	Dubai Poet
2021
Azano	Glesga Gal	Motakhayyel

2020-2011
2020
Ostilio	Qaysar	Brunch
2019
Main Edition	First Contact	Mitchum Swagger
2018
Tabarrak	Emmaus	Great Prospector
2018
Tabarrak	Emmaus	Great Prospector
2017
Jallota	Von Blucher	Lahore
2016
Latharnach	Certificate	So Beloved
2015
Zarwaan	So Beloved	Top Notch Tonto
2014
Muteela	Tawhid	Linton
2013
Top Notch Tonto	Caspar Netscher	You da One
2012
Eton Forever	Firebeam	Pepper Lane
2011
Chilworth Lad	Majestic Myles	High Standing

2010-2003
2010
Harrison George	Eton Rifles	Yaa Wayl
2009
Musaalem	Able Master	Taqdeyr
2008
Il Warrd	Tombi	Icelandic
2007
Appalachian Trail	Rahiyah	Caradak
2006
New Seeker	Suggestive	Duff
2005
Council Member	Suggestive	Pivotal Flame
2004
Gonfilia	Twilight Blues	Iqte Saab
2003
Membership	Three Graces	Resplendent Cee

The Guisborough Stakes is a Listed flat horse race in Great Britain open to horses aged three years and over. It is run at Redcar over a distance of 7 furlongs (1,408 metres), and it is scheduled to take place each year in early October.

The race was first run in 2003.

== Records ==
Most successful horse since 2003:

- No horse has won this race on more than one occasion

Leading jockey since 2003 (2 wins):

- Tom Eaves – Council Member (2005), New Seeker (2006)
- Dane O'Neill – Muteela (2014), Jallota (2017)

Leading trainer since 2003 (3 wins):

- Saeed bin Suroor – Gonfilia (2004), Council Member (2005), Il Warrd (2008)

== Winners ==
Year	Winner	Age	Jockey	Trainer	Time
2003	Membership	3	Philip Robinson	Clive Brittain	1:24.47
2004	Gonfilia	4	Kerrin McEvoy	Saeed bin Suroor	1:21.04
2005	Council Member	3	Chris Catlin	Saeed bin Suroor	1:21.32
2006	New Seeker	6	Tom Eaves	Paul Cole	1:22.87
2007	Appalachian Trail	6	Tom Eaves	Ian Semple	1:24.31
2008	Il Warrd	3	Ted Durcan	Saeed bin Suroor	1:22.97
2009	Musaalem	5	Liam Jones	William Haggas	1:22.97
2010	Harrison George	5	Paul Hanagan	Richard Fahey	1:25.50
2011	Chilworth Lad	3	Matthew Davies	Mick Channon	1:22.14
2012	Eton Forever	5	Neil Callan	Roger Varian	1:25.69
2013	Top Notch Tonto	3	Dale Swift	Brian Ellison	1:24.04
2014	Muteela	3	Dane O'Neill	Mark Johnston	1:23.41
2015	Zarwaan	4	Graham Lee	Ed Dunlop	1:23.10
2016	Latharnach	4	James Doyle	Charlie Appleby	1:23.23
2017	Jallota	6	Dane O'Neill	Charles Hills	1:23.11
2018	Tabarrak	5	Tom Marquand	Richard Hannon Jr.	1:24.18
2019	Main Edition	3	Joe Fanning	Mark Johnston	1:25.70
2020	Ostilio	5	Jack Mitchell	Simon & Ed Crisford	1:26.54
2021	Azano	5	Shane Gray	David O'Meara	1:21.19
2022	I'm A Gambler	3	Franny Norton	Charlie & Mark Johnston	1:23.34
2023	Vafortino	5	David Allan	Kevin Philippart De Foy	1:21.79
2024	Grey's Monument	4	Rossa Ryan	Ralph Beckett	1:23.80
2025	Elim	5	Connor Beasley	Edward Bethell	1:24.10
2026	Sondad	5	Joanna Mason	Mick & David Easterby	1:22.55

== See also ==
- Horse racing in Great Britain
- List of British flat horse races
