= Pavilion Stakes =

Flat horse race in Britain

- Class: Group 3
- Location: Ascot Racecourse; Ascot, England
- Race type: Flat / Thoroughbred
- Website: Ascot

Race information
- Distance: 6 furlongs (1,207 metres)
- Surface: Turf
- Track: Straight
- Qualification: Three-year-olds only
- Weight: 9 st 3 lb for colts & geldings 9 st 0 lb for fillies Penalties; 4 lb for Group 1 and Group 2 winners* *after 31 August 2024
- Purse: £80,000 (2025); 1st: £45,368

Pavilion Stakes
2026
| Coppull | Midnight Tango | Division |

Previous years
2025
Big Mojo | Diablo Rojo | Ain't Nobody
2024
Jasour | Adaay In Devon | Purosangue
2023
Cold Case | The X O | Bradsell
2022
Go Bears Go | Hierarchy | Ehraz
2021
Rohaan | Saint Lawrence | Spycatcher

2020-2011
2020
Dubai Station | Malotru | Dream Shot
2019
Calyx | No Nonsense | Konchek
2018
Invincible Army | Eqtidaar | Enjazaat
2017
Blue Point | Harry Angel | Mubtasim
2016
Gifted Master | Dream Dubai | Gracious John
2015
Limato | Tendu | Adaay
2014
Mick's Yer Man | Musical Comedy | Rufford
2013
Ninjago | Intibaah | Hasopop
2012
Gusto | Bannock | Burwaaz
2011
Perfect Tribute | Aneedah | Margot Did

2010-2001
2010
Society Rock | Corporal Maddox | Mon Cadeaux
2009
Total Gallery | Enderby Spirit | Jobe
2008
Sir Gerry | Tajdeef | Prohibit
2007
Hoh Mike | Hinton Admiral | Medley
2006
Assertive | Kingsgate Prince | Strike Up The Band
2005
Andronikos | Yajbill | Royal Orissa
2004
Millbag | Moonlight Man | Crafty Fancy
2003
Striking Ambition | Avonbridge | Baron's Pit
2002
Lady Dominatrix | Approval | Kelsey Rose

2000-1999
2000
| Mount Abu | Red Pepper | Trinculo |
1999
| Sampower Star | Lionhearted | Mitcham |

The Pavilion Stakes is a Group 3 flat horse race in Great Britain open to horses aged three years only. It is run at Ascot over a distance of 6 furlongs (1,207 metres), and it is scheduled to take place each year in late April or early May.

The race was first run in 1999 and was awarded Group 3 status (from Listed) in 2015. It is run on the same card as the Sagaro Stakes.

Since 2019 the official title has indicated that the race should be considered as a trial for the Commonwealth Cup, run at the Royal Meeting over the same course and distance in June.

== Winners ==
| Year | Winner | Jockey | Trainer | Time |
|---|---|---|---|---|
| 1999 | Sampower Star | Dane O'Neill | Richard Hannon Sr. | 1:14.15 |
| 2000 | Mount Abu | Jimmy Fortune | John Gosden | 1:17.30 |
| 2001 | Abandoned due to waterlogging |
| 2002 | Lady Dominatrix | Paul Doe | Nerys Dutfield | 1:17.23 |
| 2003 | Striking Ambition | Darryll Holland | Giles Bravery | 1:15.45 |
| 2004 | Millbag | Ted Durcan | Mick Channon | 1:21.66 |
| 2005 | Andronikos | Frankie Dettori | Paul Cole | 1:13.57 |
| 2006 | Assertive | Richard Hughes | Richard Hannon Sr. | 1:09.03 |
| 2007 | Hoh Mike | Jamie Spencer | Michael Bell | 1:13.41 |
| 2008 | Sir Gerry | Jamie Spencer | James Fanshawe | 1:17.22 |
| 2009 | Total Gallery | Liam Keniry | Stan Moore | 1:14.87 |
| 2010 | Society Rock | Pat Cosgrave | James Fanshawe | 1:14.12 |
| 2011 | Perfect Tribute | Luke Morris | Clive Cox | 1:12.19 |
| 2012 | Gusto | Richard Hughes | Richard Hannon Sr. | 1:11.84 |
| 2013 | Ninjago | Richard Hughes | Richard Hannon Sr. | 1:12.10 |
| 2014 | Mick's Yer Man | Ryan While | Bill Turner | 1:16.81 |
| 2015 | Limato | James Doyle | Henry Candy | 1:12.32 |
| 2016 | Gifted Master | Pat Smullen | Hugo Palmer | 1:14.54 |
| 2017 | Blue Point | William Buick | Charlie Appleby | 1:11.05 |
| 2018 | Invincible Army | Ryan Moore | James Tate | 1:16.36 |
| 2019 | Calyx | Frankie Dettori | John Gosden | 1:12.48 |
| 2020 (Note: The 2020 race was run at Newcastle in June, due to the COVID-19 pandemic in the United Kingdom) | Dubai Station | Ben Curtis | Karl Burke | 1:10.79 |
| 2021 | Rohaan | Ryan Moore | David Evans | 1:13.67 |
| 2022 | Go Bears Go | Rossa Ryan | David Loughnane | 1:12.46 |
| 2023 | Cold Case | Clifford Lee | Karl Burke | 1:14.55 |
| 2024 | Jasour | Jim Crowley | Clive Cox | 1:14.80 |
| 2025 | Big Mojo | Tom Marquand | Michael Appleby | 1:12.50 |
| 2026 | Coppull | Rossa Ryan | Clive Cox | 1:13.24 |

== See also ==
- Horse racing in Great Britain
- List of British flat horse races
