= Somnus (horse) =

British-bred Thoroughbred racehorse

- Sire: Pivotal
- Grandsire: Polar Falcon
- Dam: Midnight's Reward
- Damsire: Night Shift
- Sex: Gelding
- Foaled: 27 April 2000
- Country: United Kingdom
- Colour: Bay
- Breeder: Lady Legard
- Owner: Lady Legard, Roger Sidebottom and Sir Tatton Sykes
- Trainer: Tim Easterby; John Quinn
- Record: 43: 10-4-1
- Earnings: £ 743,966

Major wins
- Two-Year-Old Trophy (2002); Hackwood Stakes (2003); Haydock Sprint Cup (2003); Prix Maurice de Gheest (2004); Prix de la Forêt (2004)

Awards
- European Champion Sprinter (2004)
- Last updated on August 25, 2007

Somnus is a retired British champion Thoroughbred racehorse. One of the best European two-year-olds in 2002, he developed into a leading sprinter the following year when he won the Group One Haydock Sprint Cup. As a four-year-old he won two more Group One races in France- the Prix Maurice de Gheest (2004) and the Prix de la Forêt- and was named European Champion Sprinter at the Cartier Racing Awards. He continued racing until being retired in 2008 at the age of eight, having won ten of his forty-three races. Unlike many sprinters, Somnus was not a pure "speed horse" and ran only once, unsuccessfully, at five furlongs: all his victories came over six or seven furlongs.

== Background ==
Somnus, a bay horse who was gelded before the start of his racing career, was bred at the New England Stud by Caroline, Lady Legard, who owned him with a variety of partners throughout his racing career. His sire Pivotal was a top class sprinter who won the King's Stand Stakes and the Nunthorpe Stakes in 1996. He went on to become an "excellent" sire, getting the winners of more than a thousand races across a range of distances including Kyllachy (Nunthorpe Stakes), Excellent Art (St James's Palace Stakes) and Sariska (Oaks). Somnus's dam, Midnight's Reward won one minor race from eight starts and was a successful broodmare, producing at least six other winners. Somnus is inbred 3x4 to Northern Dancer (see below).

Somnus was raised at Sir Tatton Sykes's Sledmere Stud near Driffield, East Yorkshire before being sent as a yearling to the Doncaster St Leger sales in September via the Wiltshire-based Catridge Farm Stud. He was "bought in" for 13,500gns by Geoffrey Howson Bloodstock acting on behalf of his breeder. Lady Legard then sold shares in the colt to Sir Tatton Sykes and Roger Sidebottom. Somnus sent into training with Tim Easterby at Great Habton, near Malton, North Yorkshire. He stayed with Easterby until 2008, when he moved to the Settrington stable of John Quinn for his last three races.

== Racing career ==
=== 2002: two-year-old season ===
In 2002 Somnus was campaigned exclusively in Yorkshire and won four of his five races. After initially proving difficult to train– he suffered from bad shins and was a "nightmare" to break in– Somnus was gelded in attempt to cure his "bad behaviour". Somnus made little impression on his debut in June, finishing fifth in a six furlong maiden race at Ripon. A month later, he recorded his first win in a maiden at York, taking the lead a furlong out and winning by a neck from Monsieur Bond, a horse who went on to win two Group races. A month later he carried 130lbs to victory in a nursery (a handicap for two-year-olds) at Ripon.

Somnus was then aimed at the £200,000 St Leger Yearling Stakes at Doncaster. This was a race restricted to horses who had been sold at auction at the aforementioned sale, and Somnus started at 10/1 in a field of twenty-one. Ridden by Ted Durcan, Somnus tracked the leaders before producing a strong late run to take the lead inside the final furlong and win by half a length from the July Stakes winner Mister Links.

On his final start of the year, Somnus was sent to Redcar in October for the eighteen-runner Betabet Two-Year-Old Trophy and was allowed to take his chance in the race despite the unsuitably firm ground. He raced prominently before taking the lead two furlongs out and stayed on "gamely" under pressure to win by a head from Tout Seul, with Monsieur Bond third. The win made Somnus one of the year's biggest money earners and after the race, Lady Legard said that she felt "so lucky to have such a good horse and such a tough one." The form of the race was significantly boosted two weeks later when Tout Seul won the Group One Dewhurst Stakes at Newmarket.

=== 2003: three-year-old season ===
Somnus took time to find his best form as a three-year-old. He ran unplaced in a Listed race at Ascot in April and in the Jersey Stakes at the Royal meeting in June.

He was then dropped in class for a minor stakes race at Haydock in July, and took the lead in the final furlong before pulling clear to win by two and a half lengths. Two weeks later he won the Listed Hackwood Stakes at Newbury, taking the head close home to beat Ashdown Express and The Tatling. In August Somnus started odds-on favourite for the Shergar Cup Sprint, part on an international jockeys' tournament, but for the third time that season, he ran below form at Ascot and finished fourth. Later in the month he was beaten a neck by his stable companion Fayr Jag in the Hopeful Stakes at Newmarket. This was a good performance as he was a three-year-old attempting to give weight to older horses, and had to come from an almost impossible position after being unable to find a clear run in the closing stages.

Somnus was stepped up to Group One level for the first time in the Sprint Cup at Haydock in September. Easterby had doubts about running the horse on fast ground, but heavy rain at the Lancashire venue changed the going in his favour. He was also encouraged by the opinions of his father, the veteran trainer Peter Easterby who had visited his son's yard three days before the race and observed "by heck, that Somnus can gallop!" Somnus started at 12/1 with most of the attention being focused on the odds-on favourite Oasis Dream. Somnus "relished" the soft ground and tracked the leaders before being switched to the left by Richard Hughes and moving up to challenge Oasis Dream in the last quarter mile. Somnus passed the favourite inside the final furlong and ran on strongly to record a "decisive" victory by one and a quarter lengths. After the race Easterby explained that Somnus "does go on quick ground, but he's a lot better on soft."

On his final start of the year he ran over the minimum distance of 1000m for the first and only time and finished unplaced in the Prix de l'Abbaye at Longchamp.

=== 2004: four-year-old season ===
Somnus again started slowly in his championship season. He began in May when he finished unplaced behind Monsieur Bond in the Duke of York Stakes. He put up an improved performance to finish second in the Chipchase Stakes and then ran fifth behind Frizzante in the July Cup.

In August he was sent to France for the Group One Prix Maurice de Gheest at Deauville in which both the soft ground and the 1300m trip were ideal. Ridden by Gary Stevens Somnus tracked the leaders before moving into the lead just after half way. Several challengers emerged, but Somnus ran on "tenaciously" under pressure to win by a neck from the multiple Group One winner Whipper, with Frizante unplaced.

The 2004 Sprint Cup at Haydock looked to be the best sprint race of the year, with a "stellar" field of nineteen including the Group One winners Frizzante, Bahamian Pirate, Patavellian, Airwave and One Cool Cat. Somnus raced prominently before taking the lead a furlong out and ran on strongly but was caught on the line by the filly Tante Rose who won "by the width of her whiskers." Although he was defeated Somnus, who was conceding weight to the filly, recorded the best form figures for a sprinter in 2004 according to the Racing Post.

On his final start of the year, Somnus returned to France for the Group One Prix de la Forêt over 1400m (seven furlongs) at Longchamp. Mick Kinane held up Somnus in the early stages before making his challenge down the centre of the course in the straight. Monsieur Bond had opened up a three length advantage, but Somnus "swooped fast and late" to catch the leader in the closing stages and win by three quarters of a length.

=== 2005–2008: later career ===
Somnus stayed in training for another four seasons, but was never as good again. He ran six times in 2005, without success, although he did finish fourth in the Sprint Cup. Like Continent another Yorkshire-trained gelding who became Champion Sprinter, he became difficult to place in his later career, being no longer quite good enough for the top weight-for-age races, but too highly rated to be competitive in most handicaps.

He ran ten times in 2006, winning one minor stakes race at Haydock and finishing second in the Park Stakes at Doncaster. He finished unplaced in all five races in 2007, and after three further defeats in 2008 (when he was trained by John Quinn) he was retired from racing. Lady Legard paid tribute to her gelding saying, "He's taken us around the world, competed and triumphed at the very top level, and provided us with such fun and so many fond memories."

== Assessment ==
In the 2002 International Classification of two-year-olds, Somnus was ranked the sixth best juvenile in Europe with a rating of 117, six pounds behind Oasis Dream and five pounds below Tout Seul. His rating was controversial, as he had given six pounds to Tout Seul when beating him at Redcar.

In 2003 he was again rated on 117, making him the third best sprinter in Europe behind Oasis Dream and the Australian-trained Choisir. In the 2004 Cartier Racing Awards, Somnus was named European Champion Sprinter. He was also the highest rated sprinter in Europe on the International Classification with a rating of 118.

== Pedigree ==
Pedigree of Somnus (GB), bay gelding, 2000
Sire Pivotal (GB) 1993	Polar Falcon; 1987	Nureyev	Northern Dancer*
Sire Pivotal (GB) 1993	Polar Falcon; 1987	Nureyev	Special
Sire Pivotal (GB) 1993	Polar Falcon; 1987	Marie d'Argonne	Jefferson
Sire Pivotal (GB) 1993	Polar Falcon; 1987	Marie d'Argonne	Mohair
Sire Pivotal (GB) 1993	Fearless Revival; 1987	Cozzene	Caro
Sire Pivotal (GB) 1993	Fearless Revival; 1987	Cozzene	Ride The Trails
Sire Pivotal (GB) 1993	Fearless Revival; 1987	Stufida	Bustino
Sire Pivotal (GB) 1993	Fearless Revival; 1987	Stufida	Zerbinetta
Dam Midnight's Reward (GB) 1986	Night Shift; 1980	Northern Dancer*	Nearctic
Dam Midnight's Reward (GB) 1986	Night Shift; 1980	Northern Dancer*	Natalma
Dam Midnight's Reward (GB) 1986	Night Shift; 1980	Ciboulette	Chop Chop
Dam Midnight's Reward (GB) 1986	Night Shift; 1980	Ciboulette	Windy Answer
Dam Midnight's Reward (GB) 1986	Margaret's Ruby; 1968	Tesco Boy	Princely Gift
Dam Midnight's Reward (GB) 1986	Margaret's Ruby; 1968	Tesco Boy	Suncourt
Dam Midnight's Reward (GB) 1986	Margaret's Ruby; 1968	Pixie Jet	Polly's Jet
Dam Midnight's Reward (GB) 1986	Margaret's Ruby; 1968	Pixie Jet	Sailanna (Family: 1-h)

- Somnus is inbred 3x4 to Northern Dancer. This means that the stallion appears in both the third and fourth generation of his pedigree.
