= Two-Year-Old Trophy =

Flat horse race in Britain

Two-Year-Old Trophy
2026
Satellite Of Love	Revels	Myesme

Previous years
2025
Ardisia	Golden Brown	Argentine Tango
2024
Candy	Francisco's Piece	Northern Ticker
2023
Dragon Leader	Works Of Art	Action Point
2022
Cold Case	Holguin	Washington Heights
2021
Chipotle	Last Crusader	Symphony Perfect

2020-2011
2020
Lullaby Moon	Zamaani	Mamba Wamba
2019
Summer Sands	Troubador	Desert Safari
2018
Summer Daydream	Beat Le Bon	Kodyanna
2018
Summer Daydream	Beat Le Bon	Kodyanna
2017
Darkanna	Flying Sparkle	Foxtrot Lady
2016
Wick Powell	Whirl Me Round	Mazyoun
2015
Log Out Island	Mr Lupton	Delizia
2014
Limato	Mattmu	Wet Sail
2013
Ventura Mist	Emirates Flyer	Morning Post
2012
Body And Soul	Hototo	Annunciation
2011
Bogart	Excelette	Silverheels

2010-2001
2010
Ladies Are Forever	Codemaster	Krypton Factor
2009
Lucky Like	Kaptain Kirkup	Nosedive
2008
Total Gallery	Favourite Girl	Wave Aside
2007
Dubai Dynamo	Vhujon	Pelican Prince
2006
Danum Dancer	Rainbow Mirage	Bazroy
2005
Misu Bond	Violette	Gallery Girl
2004
Obe Gold	Caesar Beware	Dario Gee Gee
2003
Peak To Creek	Local Poet	Imperial Echo
2002
Somnus	Tout Seul	Monsieur Bond
2001
Captain Rio	Old Blue Eyes	Mizillablack

2000-1993
2000
Dim Sums	Zietunzeen	Wally McArthur
1999
Khasayl	Heathyardsblessing	Presentation
1998
Pipalong	Pistachio	Perugino Bay
1997
Grazia	Mijana	Shudder
1996
Proud Native	Nigrasine	Much Commended
1995
Blue Iris	Cayman Kai	Anthelia
1994
Maid For Walking	Princely Hush	Regal Fanfare
1993
Cape Merino	Risky	Bid For Blue

The Two-Year-Old Trophy is a Listed flat horse race in Great Britain open to horses aged two years only. It is run at Redcar over a distance of 5 furlongs and 217 yards (1,204 metres), and it is scheduled to take place each year in early October.

The race was first run in 1993 and was the brainchild of Lord Zetland, the racecourse's chairman from 1981 to 2018. The weights carried by the runners are determined by the horse's sale price. It was covered on BBC television in the early part of its history.

== Winners ==
Year	Winner	Jockey	Trainer	Time
1993	Cape Merino	John Lowe	A Smith	1:17.60
1994	Maid For Walking	David Harrison	David Loder	1:11.70
1995	Blue Iris	Philip Robinson	Michael Jarvis	1:09.70
1996	Proud Native	Willie Ryan	Alan Jarvis	1:09.50
1997	Grazia	George Duffield	Sir Mark Prescott	1:11.10
1998	Pipalong	Lindsay Charnock	Tim Easterby	1:17.10
1999	Khasayl	Tim Sprake	Peter Walwyn	1:11.50
2000	Dim Sums	Kevin Darley	David Barron	1:13.50
2001	Captain Rio	Dean McKeown	Richard Whitaker	1:09.70
2002	Somnus	Ted Durcan	Tim Easterby	1:10.40
2003	Peak To Creek	Shane Kelly	Jeremy Noseda	1:12.07
2004	Obe Gold	Chris Catlin	Mick Channon	1:08.84
2005	Misu Bond	Tony Culhane	Bryan Smart	1:09.15
2006	Danum Dancer	Silvestre De Sousa	Neville Bycroft	1:11.15
2007	Dubai Dynamo	Dean McKeown	Stan Moore	1:11.99
2008	Total Gallery	Liam Keniry	Stan Moore	1:10.22
2009	Lucky Like	Franny Norton	Eoghan O'Neill	1:10.29
2010	Ladies Are Forever	Silvestre De Sousa	Geoff Oldroyd	1:12.60
2011	Bogart	Philip Makin	Kevin Ryan	1:09.20
2012	Body And Soul	Duran Fentiman	Tim Easterby	1:13.17
2013	Ventura Mist	David Allan	Tim Easterby	1:12.19
2014	Limato	Graham Lee	Henry Candy	1:10.66
2015	Log Out Island	Sean Levey	Richard Hannon Jr.	1:10.64
2016	Wick Powell	Andrew Mullen	David Barron	1:11.16
2017	Darkanna	Barry McHugh	Richard Fahey	1:10.49
2018	Summer Daydream	Connor Beasley	Keith Dalgleish	1:13.75
2019	Summer Sands	Barry McHugh	Richard Fahey	1:12.60
2020	Lullaby Moon	Rossa Ryan	Ralph Beckett	1:14.24
2021	Chipotle	Charles Bishop	Eve Johnson Houghton	1:08.91
2022	Cold Case	Clifford Lee	Karl Burke	1:11.33
2023	Dragon Leader	Richard Kingscote	Clive Cox	1:08.89
2024	Candy	George Wood	Richard Spencer	1:10.85
2025	Ardisia	Oisin Orr	Hugo Palmer	1:11.73
2026	Satellite Of Love	Paul Mulrennan	Clive Cox	1:10.46

== See also ==
- Horse racing in Great Britain
- List of British flat horse races
