= Harry Bentley (jockey) =

British jockey

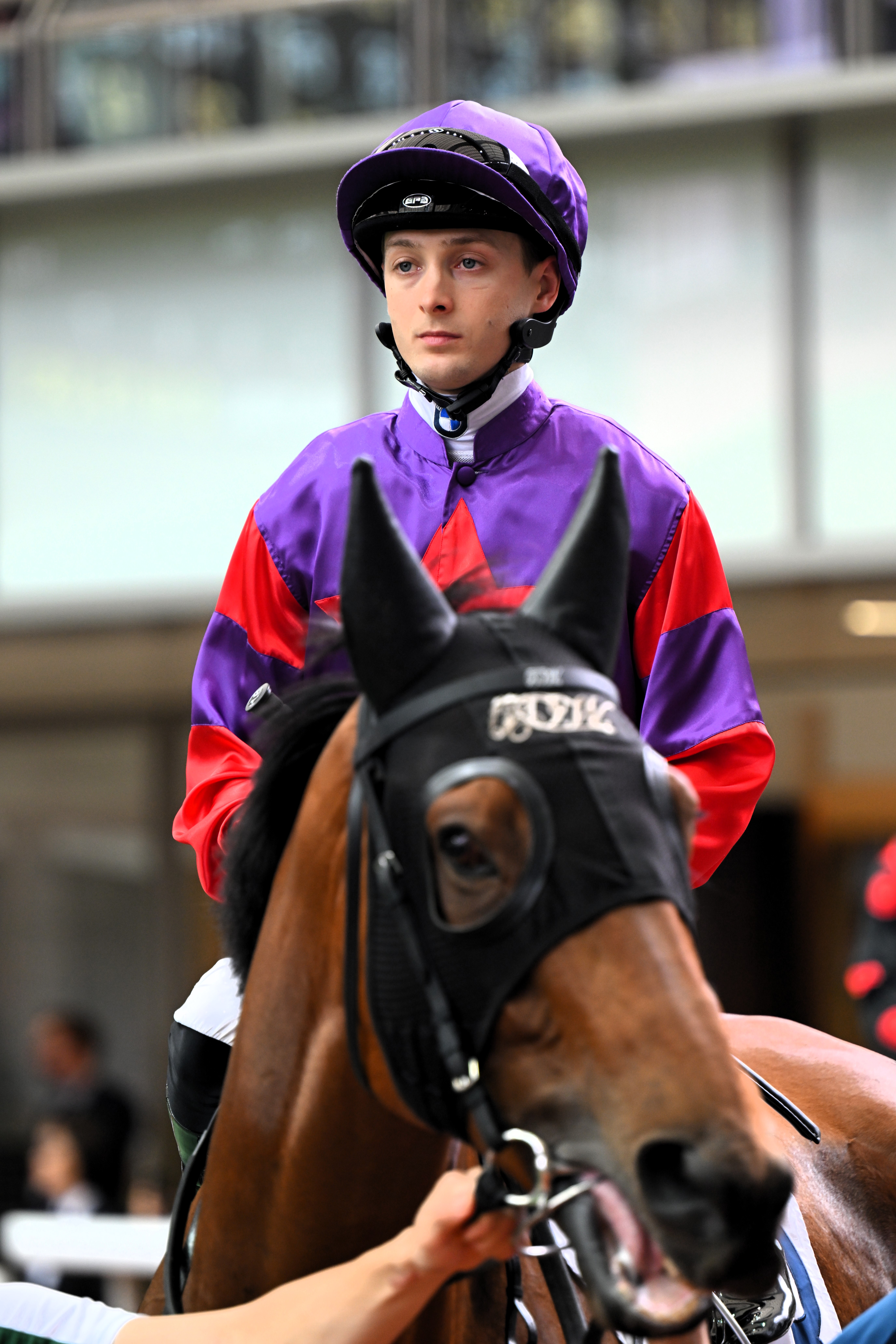
Harry Bentley at the Sha Tin Racecourse in 2024

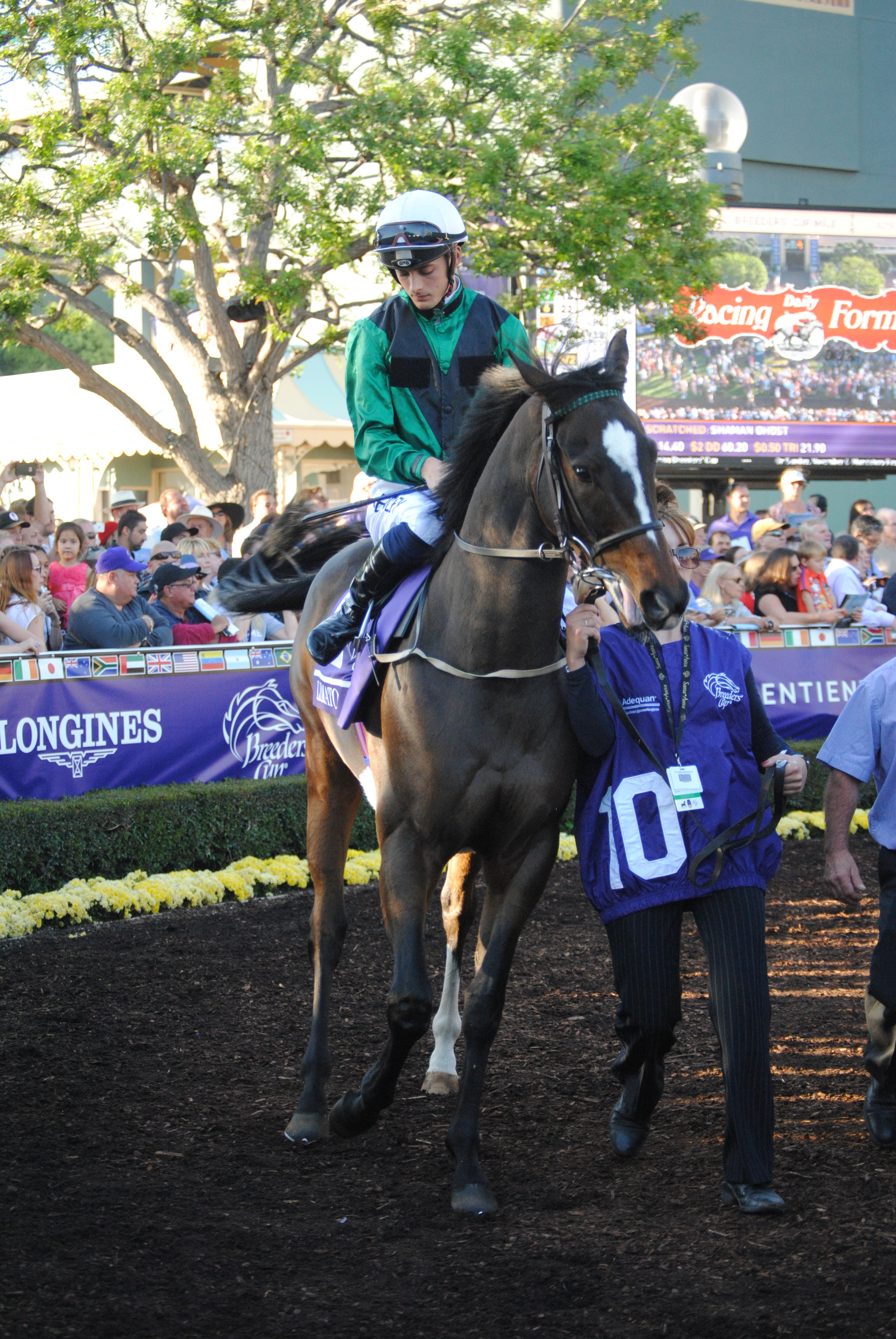
Harry Bentley on Limato in 2016

Harry William Meyrick Bentley (born 10 June 1992) is a British jockey. He is a multiple champion jockey in Qatar and relocated to Hong Kong in 2021.

He was educated at Dorset House School and Eastbourne College.

He won two Group 1s on Limato in 2016 - the July Cup and the Prix de la Forêt - but lost the ride to Ryan Moore for Royal Ascot 2017. He was later reunited with the horse, winning a Group 2 race at Newmarket in October 2017. The same day, he won a Listed race on Chain Of Daisies, leaving him on 59 winners for the season, equalling his total for 2016.

== Major wins ==
(United Kingdom) Great Britain

- July Cup – (1) - Limato (2016)

France

- Prix de la Forêt – (1) - Limato (2016)
